= List of Nepalese films of 1978–1999 =

A list of the earliest films produced in the cinema of Nepal, ordered by year of release from 1978 to 1999.

For an alphabetical list of articles on Nepalese films, see Category:Nepalese films.

== Early cinema (1951–1980) ==
| Year | Film | Artist | Director | Producer | Music |
|---|---|---|---|---|---|
| 1951 | Satya Harischandra | | D.B. Pariyar | | |
| 1964 | Aama (Mother) | Shiva Shankar, Bhuvan Chand | Heera Singh Khatri | Information Dept. Govt of Nepal | |
| 1966 | Maitighar (Maternal Home) | Mala Sinha, C.P. Lohoni | B.S. Thapa | Sumonanjali Films Pvt. Ltd. | Jaidev |
| 1967 | Hijo, Aaja, Bholi (Yesterday, Today and Tomorrow) | | Heera Singh Khatri | Information Dept. Govt of Nepal | |
| 1971 | Parivartan (Change) | | Heera Singh Khatri | Information Dept. Govt of Nepal | |
| 1973 | Mann Ko Bandh (Dam of the Heart) | Salyan K.C., Sushma Shahi | Prakash Thapa | Royal Nepal Film Corporation | Nati Kaaji - Siva Shankar |
| 1977 | Kumari (Virgin) | Biswa Basnet | Prem Bahadur Basnet | | |
| 1978 | Paral Ko Aago | Tanka Sharma, Susmita Dhakal, Basundhara Bhusal, Biswa Hingmang (debut) | Pratap Subba | Cineroma | Shanti Thatal |
| 1980 | Sindoor | Meenaxi Anand, Biswa Basnet, Neer Shah | Prakash Thapa | Royal Nepal Film Corporation | Gopal Yonjan and Nati Kazi |
| 1980 | Jeevan Rekha (Life Line) | Meenaxi Anand, Shiv Shrestha (Debut) | Prakash Thapa | Royal Nepal Film Corporation | Sachin Shrestha |

== 1981–1990 ==
| Year | Film | Artists | Director | Producer | Music |
|---|---|---|---|---|---|
| 1981 | Bansuri (Flute) | Biswa Hingmang | Tulsi Ghimire | Mohan Kumar Bannerjee | Ranjit Gazmer |
| 1982 | Juni (Incarnation) | Bhuwan K.C. (debut), Meenakshi Anand | Sarad Palekar | | |
| 1982 | Bachana Chahane Haru (Those Who Want to Live) | | Pratap Subba | | |
| 1982 | Badalindo Aakash (The Changing Sky) | Shiv Shrestha, Sushma Shahi | Laxminath Sharma | | Gopal Yonjan |
| 1983 | Samjhana (Memories) | Bhuwan K.C., Tripti Nadakar (debut), Muralidhar | Shambhu Pradhan | Ishwari Films | Ranjit Gazmer |
| 1984 | Kanchhi | Shiv Shrestha, Sharmila Malla (debut), Sushma Shahi, Mausami Malla (debut) | B.S. Thapa | Bhagawan Das Shrestha | Gopal Yonjan |
| 1985 | Ke Ghar Ke Dera (What's Home, What's Tenancy) | Puran Joshi (debut), Sharmila Malla, Madan Krishna Shrestha, Hari Bansha Acharya, Kristi Mainali (debut) | Pradeep Rimal | | |
| 1985 | Kusume Rumal (Scarlet Handkerchief) | Bhuwan K.C., Tripti Nadakar, Udit Narayan (debut) | Tulsi Ghimire | Sayapatri Films | Ranjit Gazmer |
| 1985 | Basudev | Krishna Malla (debut), Sharmila Malla, Madan Krishna Shrestha, Hari Bansha Acharya, Neer Shah, Harihar Sharma | Neer Shah | | Ranjit Gazmer |
| 1986 | Biswas | Shiv Shrestha, Roshi Karki, Rajshri Chhetri | Chetan Karki | Royal Nepal Film Corporation | Gopal Yonjan |
| 1987 | Saino (Relation) | Bhuwan K.C., Tripti Nadakar, Danny Denzongpa, Raksha Mark | Ugyen Chopel | Triple Jem Movies | Ranjit Gazmer |
| 1988 | Anyay (Injustice) | Meera Madhuri (debut), Biswa Basnet, Prakash Adhikari (debut) | Tulsi Ghimire | Sagarmatha Movietone | Ranjit Gazmer |
| 1988 | Jhodaa | | Barun Kawasi | Kusulata Interprises | Ranjit Gazmer |
| 1988 | Maya Preeti (Love and Affection) | Ravindra Khadka, Sharmila Malla, Krishna Malla | Chetan Karki | Shanti Films | Gopal Yonjan |
| 1988 | Sahas (Courage) | Shiv Shrestha | | Trishakti Films | Madan Pariyar |
| 1989 | Behuli (The Bride) | Sunita Khadka, Prakash Adhikari | Shambhu Pradhan | Ishwari Films | Ranjit Gazmer |
| 1989 | Bhagya Rekha (Line of Fate) | Rabindra Khadka, Mausami Malla | Deepak Rayamajhi | Surya Binayek Films | Norbu Tshering |
| 1989 | Santaan (Offspring) | Bhuwan K.C., Arjun Jung Shahi (debut), Karishma Manandhar (debut), Gauri Malla (debut), Shanti Maskey, Kristi Mainali | Prakash Thapa | Om Productions - Royal Nepal Film Corporation | Manohari Singh |
| 1989 | Lahure (The Armyman) | Shrawan Ghimire, Tripti Nadakar | Tulsi Ghimire | Kanchanjungha Films | Ranjit Gazmer |
| 1990 | Mayalu (Beloved) | Bhuwan K.C., Karishma Manandhar | Shambhu Pradhan | Sayapatri Films | Ranjit Gazmer |
| 1990 | Cheli Beti (Girls/Daughters) | Gauri Malla, Sharmila Malla, Arjun Jung Sahi, Mithila Sharma | Yadav Kharel | Udaya Films | Sambhujeet Baskota |
| 1990 | Pheri Bhetaula (We Shall Meet Again) | Manisha Koirala, Prakash Adhikari | Phurpa Chiring Gurung | Himchuli Films | Ranjit Gazmer |
| 1990 | Tilhari | Bhuwan K.C., Mausami Malla, Kristi Mainali | | Sayapatri Films | Jeevan Adhikari |

== 1991–1995 ==
| Year | Film | Artists | Director | Producer | Music |
|---|---|---|---|---|---|
| 1991 | Bijaya Parajaya (Victory-Defeat) | Bhuwan K.C., Krishna Malla, Brazesh Khanal, Sharmila Malla, Saroj Khanal, Rupa Rana | Rajendra Shalabh | | |
| 1991 | Chino (Souvenir) | Bhuwan K.C., Shiv Shrestha, Kristi Mainali, Sharmila Malla | Tulsi Ghimire | Om Trinetra Production | Ranjeet Gazmer |
| 1991 | Chot (Wound) | Saroj Khanal, Rupa Rana, Gauri Malla | Subodh Kumar Pokharel | | |
| 1991 | Lobhi Paapi (Greedy Sinner) | Gauri Malla, Madan Krishna Shrestha, Hari Bansha Acharya | Yadav Kharel | Creative Movies | Sambhujeet Baskota |
| 1991 | Kanyadan | Gauri Malla, Bhuwan K.C. | Prakash | Samjhana Films | Manohari Singh |
| 1991 | Sampati (Property) | Mausami Malla, Arjun Shrestha | Shambhu Pradhan | Ishwari Films | Ranjit Gazmer |
| 1991 | Trishna (Thirst) | Bhuwan K.C., Rupa Rana, Muralidhar | Ugyen Chopel | Aarati Films | Ranjit Gazmer |
| 1991 | Yug Dekhi Yug Samma (From Era to Era) | Rajesh Hamal (debut), Kristi Mainali | Deepak Rayamajhi | Kashi Prasad Shrestha | Sambhujeet Baskota |
| 1992 | Arpan (Offering) | Arjun Shrestha, Bhuwan K.C., Kristi Mainali | Rajkumar Sharma | Sayapatri Films | Bhupendra Rayamajhi |
| 1992 | Arunima | Saroj Khanal, Kristi Mainali, Karishma Manandhar, Arjun Shrestha, Mausami Malla | Mahendra Bhakta Shrestha | | |
| 1992 | Chokho Maaya (Pure Love) | Saroj Khanal, Kristi Mainali, Bijaya Lama | Raj Bikram Shah | Sagun Films | Shakti Ballav |
| 1992 | Dui Thopa Aansoo (Two Drops of Tears) | Bhuwan K.C., Shrawan Ghimire, Anuradha Sawant | Tulsi Ghimire | | Ranjit Gazmer |
| 1992 | Kastoori (Musk) | Karishma Manandhar | Kiran Pradhan | Binod Manandhar | |
| 1992 | Maya (Love) | Bhuwan K.C., Puran Joshi, Nabina Shrestha, Mausami Malla, Mithila Sharma | Pradeep Rimal | | |
| 1992 | Tapasya (Prayer) | Saroj Khanal, Gauri Malla, Beena Basnet, Karishma Manandhar | Narayan Puri | Roshana Films | |
| 1993 | Aandhi Beri (The Storm) | Gauri Malla | Yadav Kharel | | |
| 1993 | Adhikar (The Right) | Rajesh Hamal, Kristi Mainali, Mithila Sharma | Prakash Thapa | | |
| 1993 | Jhuma | Mausami Malla, Arjun Shrestha | Pradeep Upadhay | | |
| 1993 | Koseli (The Gift) | Tripti Nadakar, Krishna Malla, Bharati Ghimire, Shrawan Ghimire, Bijaya Lama | Tulsi Ghimire | | Ranjeet Gazmer |
| 1993 | Manakamana (A Heart's Desire) | Shiv Shrestha, Karishma Manandhar | Subodh Kumar Pokharel | | |
| 1993 | Milan (Meeting) | Shiv Shrestha, Brazesh Khanal, Karishma Manandhar, Melina Manandhar | Laxminath Sharma | Subodh Kumar Pokharel | Sambhujeet Baskota |
| 1993 | Priyasi (Girlfriend) | Melina Manandhar (Debut), Kiran Pratap K.C. | Deepak Rayamajhi | Dilip Khatiwada | Sambhujeet Baskota |
| 1993 | Sankalpa (Decision) | Bhuwan K.C., Krishna Malla, Sharmila Malla, Kristi Mainali, Shiv Shrestha | Shyam Rai | Om Shiv Shakti Films | Sambhujeet Baskota |
| 1994 | Bhauju (Sister-in-Law) | Rajesh Hamal, Karishma Manandhar | Rajendra Shalabh | | |
| 1994 | Deuki | Rajesh Hamal, Mausami Malla | Banni Pradhan | | |
| 1994 | Deuta (God) | Rajesh Hamal, Srijana Basnet( Debut), Shrawan Ghimire | Tulsi Ghimire | | Ranjeet Gazmer |
| 1994 | Chatyang (Lightening) | Rajesh Hamal, Gauri Malla | Pratap Subba | | |
| 1994 | Kasam (The Promise) | Rajesh Hamal, Kristi Mainali, Mausami Malla | Deepak Rayamajhi | | |
| 1994 | Naata (Relation) | Bhuwan K.C., Gauri Malla, Shree Krishna Shrestha, Ashok Sharma | Biswa Banet | | |
| 1994 | Sapana (Dream) | Bhuwan K.C., Shiv Shrestha, Karishma Manandhar, Mausami Malla | Sambhu Pradhan | | |
| 1994 | Aparadh (Crime) | Rajesh Hamal, Kristi Mainali, Melina Manandhar | Amar Rasilee | | |
| 1994 | Badal (Sky) | Bhuwan K.C., Krishna Malla, Sharmila Malla, Bina Basnet | Krishna Malla | | |
| 1994 | Chahana (A Desire) | Rajesh Hamal, Sunil Thapa, Karisma Manandhar, Santosh Panta, Saroj Khanal | Sheetal Nepal | | |
| 1994 | Cheli (A Girl) | Mausami Malla, Dhiren Shakya | Raju Dhowj Rana | Shradha Arts | Anil Shahi |
| 1994 | Dakshina (Tribute) | Bhuwan K.C., Niruta Singh (Debut) | Tulsi Ghimire | | Ranjeet Gazmer |
| 1994 | Dushman (Enemy) | Kiran Pratap, Saroj Khanal, Mausami Malla, Rupa Rana | Badri Adhikari | Nirmala Rana | Bhupendra Rayamajhi |
| 1994 | Janma Janma (One Life to Another) | Saroj Khanal, Dhiren Shahkya | Sheetal Nepal | Multi Track Movies | Subh Bahadhur |
| 1994 | Jhajhalko (Remembrances) | Shiv Shrestha, Gauri Malla, Kristi Mainali, Shree Krishna Shrestha (Debut) | Gagan Birahi | United Films | Sambhujeet Baskota |
| 1994 | Pahilo Prem (First Love) | | Chetan Karki | | Gopal Yonjan |
| 1994 | Sadak (Road) | Rajesh Hamal, Saroj Khanal, Sunny Runiyar | Tirth Thapa | | |
| 1994 | Paribhasa (Definition) | Rajesh Hamal, Saroj Khanal, Karishma Manandhar | Rajendra Shalabh | | |
| 1994 | Prem Puja(Praising of Love) | Dhiren Shakya | Raju Dhowj Rana | Sunsine Films | Anil Shahi |
| 1994 | Prithvi(World) | Rajesh Hamal, Srijana Basnet, Mausami Malla | Prakash Sayami | Shiva Shakti Films | Shakti Ballav |
| 1994 | Pukar(Call) | Saroj Khanal, Bina Basnet | Mohan Niraula | | |
| 1994 | Rakchaya (Protection) | | Prem Baniya | | |
| 1994 | Sannani (A Small Girl) | Saroj Khanal, Anita Silwal | Narayan Puri | | |
| 1994 | Saubhagye(Good Luck) | Dhiren Shakya, Mausami Malla, Rupa Rana | Madhav Sapkota | Sangam Films | Chandra Thapa |
| 1994 | Sauta (2nd wife) | Bhuwan K.C., Karishma Manandhar, Bina Basnet | Narayn Puri | | |
| 1994 | Shanti Deep (Light of Peace) | Puran Joshi, Arjun Jung Shahi, Nabina Shrestha, Mithila Sharma | Royal Nepal Film Corporation | Laxminath Sharma | Nati Kaji - Shiv Shankar |
| 1994 | Mahadevi | Bhuwan K.C., Karishma Manandhar | Narayan Puri | | |
| 1994 | Swarga (Heaven) | Arjun Shrestha, Gauri Malla | Sambhu Pradhan | | Sambhujeet Baskota |
| 1994 | Truck Driver | Shiv Shrestha, Karishma Manandhar, Bijay Lama | Raj Kumar Sharma | | Sambhujeet Baskota |
| 1994 | Tuhuro (Orphan) | Bhuwan K.C., Srijana Basnet, Mausami Malla, Dinesh D C | | | Sambhujeet Baskota |
| 1995 | Daju Bhai (Brothers) | Bhuwan K.C., Shree Krishna Shrestha, Mausami Malla | Banni Pradhan | Lady Bird Films | Shubh Bahadur |
| 1995 | Dharma (Religion) | | Amar Rasilee | | |
| 1995 | Jaali Rumal (The Knitted Handkerchief) | Shree Krishna Shrestha, Melina Manandhar, Sudhamshu Joshi | Anish Koirala | | |
| 1995 | Janma Bhoomi (Motherland) | Bipana Thapa (Debut) | Mohan Niraula | | |
| 1995 | Jeevan Sangharsha (Struggles of Life) | Rajesh Hamal, Mithila Sharma | | | |
| 1995 | Jwala(Flame) | | Mukunda Bastakoti | | Sila Bahadur Moktan |
| 1995 | Karja (Debt) | Dhiren Shakya, Kristi Mainali, Ganesh Upreti | Kishore Rana | | |
| 1995 | Maha Maya(Greatest Love) | Shiv Shrestha, Saroj Khanal, Gauri Malla, Mithila Sharma | Prakash Thapa | | |
| 1995 | Mohani (Fatal Attraction) | Ganesh Upreti, Bina Basnet, Saroj Khanal | Ramesh Budathoki | | Sambhujeet Baskota |
| 1995 | Prem Pinda | Saroj Khanal, Sani Rauniyar(Debut), Melina Manandhar, Neer Shah | Yadav Kharel | | Sambhujeet Baskota |
| 1995 | Ragat (Blood) | Saroj Khanal, Bipana Thapa, Bina Basnet | Narayan Puri | Kalpana Acharya | Sachin Singh |
| 1995 | Sarangi | Saroj Khanal, Brazesh Khanal, Karishma Manandhar ||Laxminath Sharma ||||Sambhujeet Baskota | | | |
| 1995 | Sarswati | Gauri Malla | Sambhu Pradhan | | |
| 1995 | Simana (Border) | Rajesh Hamal, Dhiren Shakya, Melina Manandhar | Prakash Sayami | Rajendra Maharjan | Shakti Ballav |

== 1996 ==
| Year | Film | Artist | Director | Producer | Music |
|---|---|---|---|---|---|
| 1996 | Aaghat | Kristi Mainali, Bhuwan K.C., Shree Krishna Shrestha | | | |
| 1996 | Aafno Birano (Own Others) | | | | |
| 1996 | Avatar (Incarnation) | Rajesh Hamal, Gauri Malla, Jal Shah (Debut) | Prakash Sayami | | |
| 1996 | Agni Parichya (The Fire Test) | Rajesh Hamal, Bipana Thapa | Surya Bohra | Machha Puchhre Films | Sambhujeet Baskota |
| 1996 | Anartha (Wrong Meaning) | | Kundan Khanal | National Vision | Anil Shahi |
| 1996 | Andolan (Strike) | Karishma Manandhar, Dinesh Sharma | Tirtha Thapa | | Prakash Gurung |
| 1996 | Balidan (Offering) | Madan Krishna Shrestha, Hari Bansa Acharya | Tulsi Ghimire | | |
| 1996 | Bandhan (Imprison) | Rajesh Hamal, Karishma Manandhar, Melina Manandhar, Dinesh Sharma | Resh Raj Acharya | Sigdel Films | Subh Bahadur |
| 1996 | Bhariya (Sky Hop) | Rajesh Hamal, Melina Manandhar | Dayaram Dahal | Chandramukhi Films | Anil Shahi |
| 1996 | Chhori Buhari (Daughter Daughter-in-law) | Rajesh Hamal, Pooja Chand | Laxminath Sharma | | |
| 1996 | Chunauti(Challenge) | Saroj Khanal, Shree Krishna Shrestha, Bipana Thapa | Naresh Kumar Poudel | Ranjeet Movies | Sambhujeet Baskota |
| 1996 | Daijo (Dowry) | Bhuwan K.C., Melina Manandhar | Dayaram Dahal | Shankha Devi Cine Arts | Anil Shahi |
| 1996 | Jaya Baba Pashupati Nath (Hail Father Pashupati Nath) | Saroj Khanal, Sudhamshu Joshi | Satish Kumar | Sayapatri Films | Muralidhar |
| 1996 | Laxmi Puja | Kristi Mainali, Ganesh Upreti, Shree Krishna Shrestha | | | |
| 1996 | Karodpati (Millionaire) | Bhuwan K.C., Sushmita K.C. | Kishore Rana | | Sambhujeet Baskota |
| 1996 | Nirmaya | Shree Krishna Shrestha, Saranga Shrestha | Narayan Puri | | |
| 1996 | Nirmohi | | Nayan Raj Pandey | | |
| 1996 | Paachuri (Swal) | Shiv Shrestha, Bhuwan K.C., Kristi Mainali, Nabina Shrestha | Banni Pradhan | Amrita Cine Arts | Yujin Lama |
| 1996 | Prateeksha (Waiting) | Karishma Manandhar | Raj Bikram Shah | | |
| 1996 | Raanko | Shiv Shrestha, Bhuwan K.C., Gauri Malla, Mithila Sharma, Bijaya Lama, Kristi Mainali | Kishore Rana | | |
| 1996 | Rahar (Wish) | Niruta Singh | Tulsi Ghimire | Ajambari Films | Ranjit Gazmer |
| 1996 | Sun Chandi (Gold Silver) | Shree Krishna Shrestha, Saranga Shrestha | Sambhu Pradhan | Ishwori Films | Sambhujeet Baskota |
| 1996 | Yo Maya Le Launa Satayo (This love irritated me) | | Deepak Rayamajhi | | |

== 1997 ==
| Year | Film | Artists | Director | Producer | Music |
|---|---|---|---|---|---|
| 1997 | Allare | Rajesh Hamal, Karishma Manandhar, Ashok Sharma | Ashok Sharma | | Sambhujeet Baskota |
| 1997 | Bishalu | | Dev Kuamr Shrestha | | |
| 1997 | Chandal | Rajesh Hamal, Karishma Manandhar | Arun Kumar Jha | | |
| 1997 | Chahaari | | | | |
| 1997 | Daiba Sanyog | Manju Kumar Shrestha | | | |
| 1997 | Dauntari | | | | |
| 1997 | Des Pardes | Dhiren Shakya, Karishma Manandhar | Yuva Raj Lama | | |
| 1997 | Deurali | | Yuva Raj Lama | | |
| 1997 | Guru Chela | Shree Krishna Shrestha, Saranga Shrestha | | | Sambhujeet Baskota |
| 1997 | Ishwor | Shiva Shrestha, Jal Shah | | | |
| 1997 | Jalan | Dinesh Sharma | Mukunda Bastakoti | | |
| 1997 | Jameen | Dhiren Shakya, Bipana Thapa | | | |
| 1997 | Jun Tara | Rajesh Hamal, Dhiren Shakya, Neer Shah | Ramesh Budathoki | | |
| 1997 | Khelauna | | Yuva Raj Lama | | |
| 1997 | Miteri Gaun | Shiv Shrestha, Pooja Chand, Pabitra Subba | Gagan Birahi | | |
| 1997 | Naaso | Shiv Shrestha, Karishma Manandhar, Saranga Shrestha | Yadav Kharel | | |
| 1997 | Pocketmaar | | Raju Dhowj Rana | | |
| 1997 | Parai Ghar | Jal Shah, Ramesh Upreti | Deepak Rayamajhi | | |
| 1997 | Rajkumar | Dhiren Shakya, Karishma Manandhar, Pooja Chand | | | |
| 1997 | Seema Rekha | Sanu Baba, Sudhamshu Joshi | Rajani Rana | Kishore Rana | |
| 1997 | Shankar | Rajesh Hamal, Jal Shah, Bipana Thapa | Narayan Puri | | |

== 1998 ==
| Year | Film | Artists | Director | Producer | Music |
|---|---|---|---|---|---|
| 1998 | Ansha Banda | | Suraj Subba | | |
| 1998 | Bahadur | | Ashok Shrestha | | |
| 1998 | Bhanu Bhakta | Dilip Rayamajhi (Debut), Anita Silwal | Yadav Kharel | | |
| 1998 | Chamatkar | | | | |
| 1998 | Chor | Rajesh Hamal, Bipana Thapa | Raj Kumar Sharma | | |
| 1998 | Devdut (God's Messenger) | Shree Krishna Shrestha, Bipana Thapa, Ramesh Upretti, Yubaraj Lama | Yuva Raj Lama | | |
| 1998 | Dulaha Raja Dulahi Rani | Bipana Thapa | Yuva Raja Lama | | |
| 1998 | Filim | | Madan Krishna Shrestha, Hari Bansa Acharya | | |
| 1998 | Gaunle | Rajesh Hamal, Bipana Thapa | Deepak Shrestha | Laxmi Puj Films | Tika Bhandari |
| 1998 | Ghaam Chayan | | Kishore Rana | | |
| 1998 | Jeet | Shree Krishna Shrestha, Bipana Thapa, Ramesh Upreti | Laxminath Sharma | | |
| 1998 | Mr Ram Krishne | Rajesh Hamal, Karishma Manandhar, Ashok Sharma, Saranga Shrestha | Ashok Sharma | | Shambhujeet Baskota |
| 1998 | Nayak | | Manju Kumar Shrestha | | |
| 1998 | Pardesi | | | | |
| 1998 | Pardesi Kancha | Rajesh Hamal, Karishma Manandhar | | Karishma Films | |
| 1998 | Rana Bhoomi | | Aakash Adhikari | | |
| 1998 | Rani Khola | Melina Manandhar, Bipana Thapa | | | |
| 1998 | Sagun | Shiv Shrestha, Bipana Thapa | | | |
| 1998 | Kasto Samjhauta | | Deepak Rayamajhi | | |
| 1998 | Shikhar | Shree Krishna Shrestha/ Shyaroon Sherpa | Gagan Birahi | | Deepak Jangam |
| 1998 | Sindur Pote | | Raju Dhowj Rana | | |
| 1998 | Suraksha | | Armit Sharma | | |
| 1998 | The Kommando | | JB Rai | Basanti Rai | Sachin Singh |
| 1998 | Thuldai | Shiv Shrestha, Jal Shah, Niruta Singh | Dayaram Dahal | K.B. Pandit | Shambhujeet Baskota |

== 1999 ==
| Year | Film | Artists | Director | Producer | Music |
|---|---|---|---|---|---|
| 1999 | Afanta | Niruta Singh, Shree Krishna Shrestha | Shiva Regmi | | |
| 1999 | Apsara | Bipana Thapa, Sanchita Luitel (Debut), Ramesh Upreti | | | Sambhujeet Baskota |
| 1999 | Awara | | Bijaya Thapa | | |
| 1999 | Bhai | | Deepak Shrestha | | |
| 1999 | Chalachitra | | Biswa Basnet | | |
| 1999 | Chameli | | Ravi Baral | | |
| 1999 | Chandani | Rajesh Hamal, Niruta Singh | Dayaram Dahal | | |
| 1999 | Chhori Buhari | | | | |
| 1999 | Dharam Sankat | | Resh Raj Acharya | | |
| 1999 | Dharmaputra | Rajesh Hamal | Yuva Raj Lama | | |
| 1999 | Dodhar | | Narendra Shrestha | | |
| 1999 | Ek Number Ko Pakhe | Rajesh Hamal, Karishma Manandhar, Jal Shah | Kishore Rana | | Sambhujeet Baskota |
| 1999 | Gorkhali | Sree Krishna Shrestha, Jharana Thapa | Gyanendra Deuja | | |
| 1999 | Hathiyar | Jharna Bajracharya, Karisma Manandhar, Lokendra karki, Simanta Udas | Prakash Sayami | | |
| 1999 | Himalaya (Caravan) - official Entry for Oscars | | | | |
| 1999 | Jange | | Dayaram Dahal | | |
| 1999 | Jindagani | Rajesh Hamal, Pooja Chand, Karishma Manandhar, Dilip Rayamajhi, Santosh Panta | Ujjawal Ghimire | | |
| 1999 | Kancha | Rajesh Hamal, Karishma Manandhar | Surya Bohra | | |
| 1999 | Mato Bolcha | Rajesh Hamal, Bipana Thapa, Dinesh Sharma, Melina Manandhar | Resh Raj Acharya | Sayapatri Films | |
| 1999 | Maute dai | Yuva Raj Lama, Ramesh Upreti, Jala Shah | Yuva Raj Lama | | |
| 1999 | Nagad Narayan | Ramesh Upreti, Rajesh Hamal | Resh Raj Acharya | | |
| 1999 | Nata Ragat Ko | Niruta Singh, Ganesh Upreti, Shree Krishna Shrestha, Jal Shah | | Prakash Thapa | |
| 1999 | Pareli | | Deepak Rayamajhi | | |
| 1999 | Sukumbasi | Rajesh Hamal, Sunil dutta pandey, Deepa shree niraula, sunil thapa | Late. Sagar Pandey | Dinesh Wagle | |
| 1999 | Timinai Basyau Mero Manma | | Banni Pradhan | | |
