= List of Nepalese films of 2001 =

A list of the earliest films produced in the Cinema of Nepal, ordered by year of release from 2001. For an alphabetical list of articles on Nepalese films, see Category:Nepalese films.

Title	Director	Cast	Genre	Notes
2001
Aafno Manchhe				
Aashirbad	Sambhu Pradhan	Ram Krishna Dhakal, Rajesh Hamal		
Afno Ghar Afno Manche				
Army				
Badal Paree				
Baimani				
Bar Pipal	Laxminath Sharma	Shree Krishna Shrestha		
Bihani				
Buhari				
Daag				
Daiva Sanjog				
Dulahi				
Darpan Chhaya	Tulsi Ghimire	Niruta Singh, Dilip Rayamajhi, Uttam Pradhan, Tulsi Ghimire		
Gaajal				
Haudey				
Jeevan Saathi				
Kaidi				
Ke Bho Lau Na Ni				
Manai Ta Ho				
Maya Baiguni				
Maya Ko Saino				
Natedar				
Nepal Pyaro Chha				
Numafung				
Pirati Aafai Hudon Rahechha				
Rough Cut on the Life and Times of Lachuman Magar				
Siudo Ko Sindoor				
SuperStar		Bhuwan KC		
Timrai Lagi				
Yo Kasto Saino				
Yo Maya Ko Sagar	Ashok Sharma	Ramesh Upreti, Jal Shah, Neer Shah, Saranga Shrestha, Rajesh Hamal, Karishma Manandhar	Romantic comedy	
