= South Asian cinema =

Overview of South Asian film culture

South Asian cinema refers to the cinema of Afghanistan, Bangladesh, Bhutan, India, Maldives, Nepal, Pakistan, and Sri Lanka. The broader terms Asian cinema, Eastern cinema and Oriental cinema in common usage often encompass South Asia as well as East Asia and Southeast Asia.

Cinema is prominent in South Asia, with the Bollywood (representing the most-spoken language in the region of Hindi) and South Indian film industries being the most dominant. Pakistan's Lollywood also is growing, while historically, Bengali cinema was highly acclaimed by international film circles.

== Styles and genres ==
The scope of South Asian cinema is huge and takes in a wide array of different film styles, linguistic regions, and genres. South Asian cinema is particularly famous in the West for:

- Melodramatic films
  - Action films
  - Curry Westerns
  - Escapism
  - Musicals
  - Romance films
  - Masala films
- Parallel cinema
  - Drama films
  - Thriller films
  - Art films
  - Indian neo-noir
  - Neorealism
- Heroic bloodshed
- Historical drama

== Regional industries ==
=== Afghan cinema ===
Afghanistan's domestic film industry emerged in 1965 upon the creation of the government-funded Afghan Film studios in Kabul, eventuating in production companies such as Nazir Film and Ariana Film. As Kuhn& Westwell note these companies primarily:

"Employed Russian-trained filmmakers such as Khaleq A’lil, Rafiq Yahyaee, and Wali Latifi. Under Soviet occupation (1979–89) film production was [swiftly] centralized and [targeted] towards production of propaganda, including Farar/Escape (1984) and Sabur-e sarbaz/Saboor, the Soldier (1985), both directed by renowned Afghan director ‘Engineer’ Latif Ahmadi."

Decades of conflict, the installation of the Taliban and economic instability have resulted in, between 1951 and 2004 less than forty Afghan films being created.

=== Bangladeshi cinema ===
Bangladeshi cinema, is the Bengali language film industry based in Dhaka, Bangladesh. The industry often generally referred to as Dhakai Cinema or Dhallywood, has been a significant film industry since the early 1970s. The 1960s, 1970s, 1980s, and the first half of the 1990s were the golden years for Bangladeshi films as the industry produced many successful films. The industry has recently begun receiving international acclaim and many Bangladeshi films are getting released internationally.

=== Indian cinema ===
India contains many state languages which have film industries centered on them.

- Assamese cinema, the Assamese-language film industry based in Guwahati, Assam.
- Bengali cinema, popularly known as "Tollywood", the Bengali-language film industry based in Kolkata, West Bengal and the state of Tripura.
- Bhojpuri cinema, the Bhojpuri-language film industry based in the state of Bihar.
- Chhattisgarhi cinema, the Chhattisgarhi-language film industry based in the state of Chhattisgarh.
- Dogri cinema, the Dogri-language film industry based in Jammu and Kashmir.
- Gujarati cinema, the Gujarati-language film industry based in Ahmedabad, Gujarat.
- Haryanvi cinema, the Haryanvi-language film industry based in the state of Haryana.
- Hindi cinema, popularly known as "Bollywood", the Hindi-language film industry based in Mumbai, Maharashtra.
- Kannada cinema, popularly known as "Sandalwood", the Kannada-language film industry based in Bangalore, Karnataka.
- Kashmiri cinema, the Kashmiri-language film industry based in Jammu and Kashmir and Ladakh.
- Malayalam cinema, popularly known as "Mollywood", the Malayalam-language film industry based in Kochi, Kerala and Thiruvananthapuram, Kerala.
- Marathi cinema, the Marathi-language film industry based in Mumbai, Maharashtra and Pune, Maharashtra.
- Meitei cinema, the Meitei-language film industry based in Imphal, Manipur.
- Cinema of Odisha, popularly known as "Ollywood", the Odia-language film industry based in Bhubaneshwar, Odisha and Cuttack, Odisha.
- Punjabi cinema, popularly known as "Pollywood", the Punjabi-language film industry based in the state of Punjab.
- Cinema of Rajasthan, the Rajasthani-language film industry based in the state of Rajasthan.
- Santali cinema, the Santali-language film industry based in the states of Jharkhand and Odisha.
- Tamil cinema, popularly known as "Kollywood", the Tamil-language film industry based in Chennai, Tamil Nadu.
- Telugu cinema, popularly known as "Tollywood", the Telugu-language film industry based in Hyderabad, Telangana and the state of Andhra Pradesh.
- Tulu cinema, the Tulu-language film industry based in Mangalore, Karnataka.

=== Nepali cinema ===
- Nepali film industry, the Nepali film industry based in Kathmandu, has recently begun receiving international acclaim with films such as The Black Hen (2015), Kagbeni (2006), Dying Candle (2016) and others.
- Tharu Cinema based in Terai, Tharuhat is the home of the Tharu languages cinema.

=== Pakistani cinema ===
- Balochi cinema, based in Quetta, Balochistan is the home of Balochi language film productions.
- Lollywood, based in Lahore, Punjab for Punjabi cinema and Karachi, Sindh for Urdu cinema.
- Pashto cinema, based in Peshawar, Khyber Pakhtunkhwa is the home of Pashto language film productions.
- Sindhi cinema, based in Karachi, Sindh, Pakistan is the home of the Sindhi language film productions.

=== Others ===
- Sri Lankan cinema
  - Sri Lankan Tamil cinema
- Bhutanese cinema

== Some figures of South Asian cinema ==
=== Directors ===
- A. R. Murugadoss – Tamil director (Ghajini, Ghajini, Thuppakki, Kaththi, Sarkar, Darbar)
- Abu Shahed Emon
- Anil Ravipudi
- Adoor Gopalakrishnan – Malayalam director (Elippathayam, Swayamvaram).
- Alamgir Kabir
- Amitabh Reza Chowdhury
- Anurag Kashyap - (Gangs of Wasseypur, Black Friday)
- Aparna Sen – Indian Bengali actress and director (36 Chowringhee Lane, Mr. and Mrs. Iyer).
- Ashutosh Gowariker – Contemporary Hindi actor, director and producer (Lagaan).
- Asoka Handagama - recognized as the pioneer of Sri Lankan cinema's ‘ third revolution’
- Balu Mahendra – Sri Lanka-born Tamil and Malayalam director (Sandhya Raagam, Veedu).
- Basu Chatterjee – (Chitchor).
- Bharathiraja – Tamil director who captured village life (Muthal Mariyathai, Vedham Pudhithu).
- Bimal Roy – Hindi film director (Devdas, Do Bigha Zameen).
- Boyapati Srinu
- Budhhadeb Dasgupta – Uttara, internationally acclaimed filmmaker known for surrealism and magical realism.
- Chashi Nazrul Islam
- Dasari Narayana Rao
- Deepa Mehta – Indian-born Canadian director best known for her "elements trilogy". Fire, Earth, Water).
- Dharmasena Pathiraja - Widely recognized as the pioneer of Sri Lankan cinema's ‘second revolution’
- Ehtesham
- EVV Satyanarayana
- Fateh Lohani
- Girish Karnad – (Anand Bhairavi).
- Govind Nihalani – Cinematographer and director.
- Gurinder Chadha – British director (Bend It Like Beckham, Bride and Prejudice).
- Guru Dutt – Hindi actor, director and producer of the 1950s and '60s (Mr. & Mrs. '55, Kaagaz Ke Phool, Pyaasa).
- Hrishikesh Mukherjee – Hindi film director known for (Anand, Abhimaan).
- Humayun Ahmed – One of the most successful writers and directors of Bangladesh.
- K. Asif – Mughal-e-Azam
- K. Balachander – Tamil director.
- K. Raghavendra Rao
- K. S. Ravikumar – Tamil film director (Muthu, Padayappa, Dasavathaaram)
- K. Viswanath – Telugu director known for films like Sankarabharanam, Swathi Muthyam, Swayam Krushi.
- Kamal Amrohi – Mahal Pakeezah Razia Sultan
- Kamar Ahmed Saimon
- Ketan Mehta – (Bhavni Bhavai, Maya Memsaab).
- Khan Ataur Rahman
- Krishna Vamsi
- Lester James Peries - Considered as the father of Sri Lankan cinema
- Madhur Bhandarkar – Director and screenwriter (Page 3, Chandni Bar).
- Malaka Dewapriya - is a contemporary young Sri Lankan filmmaker
- Mahboob
- Mani Ratnam – Generally works in Tamil films but has worked in Hindi, Malayalam, Telugu and Kannada industries. (Kannathil Muthamittal, Guru).
- Mani Shankar – Director of Bollywood action thrillers (16 December, Tango Charlie)
- Manmohan Desai – (Parvarish, Amar Akbar Anthony).
- Mira Nair – (Monsoon Wedding, Salaam Bombay!).
- Morshedul Islam
- Mostofa Sarwar Farooki
- Mrinal Sen – Bengali film director, has won awards at major film festivals (Baishey Shravan, Bhuvan Shome).
- Nagathihalli Chandrashekhar – (America! America!!, Amruthadhaare).
- Narayan Ghosh Mita
- Nasir Hussain – (Qayamat Se Qayamat Tak)
- Nischal Basnet – (Loot, Loot 2)
- Partho Sen-Gupta – Avant-garde independent director (Hava Aney Dey).
- Prakash Jha – Contemporary Hindi director (Gangaajal, Apaharan).
- Prakash Mehra – (Zanjeer, Hera Pheri).
- Prashanta Nanda – Oriya film director who won most of the National Awards for his contribution for Oriya Film Industry.
- Prashanta Nanda - recognized as the pioneer of realistict cinema at third generation in the Sri Lankan cinema.’
- Puri Jagannadh
- Puttanna Kanagal – (Belli moda).
- Rajkumar Santoshi – (Ghayal, Andaz Apna Apna).
- Rakesh Roshan – (Karan Arjun, Krrish).
- Rakeysh Omprakash Mehra – Director and screenwriter (Aks, Rang De Basanti).
- Ram Gopal Varma – (Shiva, Rangeela).
- Ramesh Sippy – (Sholay, Andaz)
- Ritwik Ghatak – Bengali film director, (Nagarik, Meghe Dhaka Tara).
- S. S. Rajamouli – Telugu film director, (Baahubali: The Beginning, Baahubali 2: The Conclusion, RRR).
- S. Shankar – Tamil director and producer (Gentleman, Indian, Mudhalvan, Anniyan, Sivaji: The Boss, Enthiran, I, 2.0)
- Saawan Kumar
- Sanjay Gupta – (Zinda)
- Sanjay Leela Bhansali – (Devdas, Black)
- Santosh Sivan – Award-winning cinematographer and director (The Terrorist, Asoka).
- Satyajit Ray – Bengali film director, widely regarded as one of the greatest auteurs of 20th century cinema (Apu trilogy).
- Shekhar Kapur – British India-born director and producer (Elizabeth, Bandit Queen).
- Shyam Benegal – Important part of the New India Cinema movement (Ankur, Bhumika).
- Sonali Gulati – contemporary independent filmmaker, activist, and feminist who has made award-winning documentary and experimental films.
- Subhash Dutta
- Sudhir Mishra – Contemporary director and screenwriter (Hazaaron Khwaishein Aisi, Chameli).
- Sukumar
- S.V. Krishna Reddy
- Syed Noor
- Tanvir Mokammel
- Tareque Masud
- Trivikram
- Tulsi Ghimire – Nepali movie director (Known for Kusume Rumal, Lahure, Darpan Chaya)
- Upendra – (A, Om).
- V. Shantaram – Hindi director and actor (Do Aankhen Barah Haath).
- Vidhu Vinod Chopra – (An Encounter with Faces, 1942: A Love Story).
- Vijay Anand – Bollywood actor, director, and producer mainly during the 1960s and '70s. (Johnny Mera Naam, Jewel Thief)
- Vikram Bhatt – (Inteha, Deewane Huye Pagal).
- Yash Chopra – Veteran producer and director (Waqt, Deewaar).
- Yograj Bhat – (Mungaru Male).
- Zahir Raihan
- Tulsi Ghimire – Nepali movie director (Known for Kusume Rumal, Lahure, Darpan Chaya)

=== Actors ===
- Aamir Khan
- Aaryan Sigdel
- Abdur Razzak
- Abhishek Bachchan
- Ajay Devgan
- Ajith Kumar
- Aravind Swamy
- Akkineni Nageswara Rao
- Akshay Kumar
- Alamgir
- Allu Arjun
- Ambareesh
- Amitabh Bachchan
- Amrish Puri
- Anant Nag
- Ananta Jalil
- Anil Chatterjee
- Anil Kapoor
- Anmol K.C.
- Anubhav Mohanty
- Anwar Hossain
- Arifin Shuvoo
- Arjun Sarja
- Arpan Thapa
- Arshad Warsi
- Ashok Kumar
- ATM Shamsuzzaman
- Balraj Sahni
- Bappy Chowdhury
- Bhuwan K.C.
- Bipin Karki
- Biraj Bhatta
- Bulbul Ahmed
- Chandra Mohan
- Chhabi Biswas
- Chiranjeet
- Chiranjeevi
- Chunky Pandey
- Daggubati Venkatesh
- Deepak Adhikari Dev
- Dev Anand
- Dhanush
- Dharmendra
- Dilip Kumar
- Dipjol
- Dulquer Salmaan
- Fahadh Faasil
- Faisal Rehman
- Fawad Khan
- Ferdous Ahmed
- Feroz Khan
- Hamza Ali Abbasi
- Hrithik Roshan
- Humayun Faridi
- Humayun Saeed
- Ilias Kanchan
- Jackie Shroff
- Jagathi Sreekumar
- Jagapathi Babu
- Jayam Ravi
- Jayan
- Jayaram
- Jeet (actor)
- Jeetendra
- Kamal Haasan
- Kazi Maruf
- Kishore Kumar
- Krishna
- M.G. Ramachandran
- Mahesh Babu
- Mammooty
- Mamnun Hasan Emon
- Manna
- Manoj Bajpai
- Manoj Kumar
- Mehmood
- Mithun Chakraborty
- Moammar Rana
- Mohammad Ali
- Mohan Babu
- Mohanlal
- Mohib Mirza
- Mukesh
- Nandamuri Balakrishna
- N. T. Rama Rao Jr.
- N. T. Rama Rao
- Nadeem
- Naga Chaitanya
- Nagarjuna
- Nana Patekar
- Nani
- Naseeruddin Shah
- Nikhil Upreti
- Nithin
- Nivin Pauly
- Om Puri
- Omar Sani
- Pahari Sanyal
- Pawan Kalyan
- Prabhas
- Prabhu Deva
- Pran
- Prithviraj Sukumaran
- Prosenjit Chatterjee
- Puneeth Rajkumar
- Madavan
- Raaj Kumar
- Rabi Ghosh
- Rahsaan Islam
- Raisul Islam Asad
- Raj Kapoor
- Rajendra Prasad
- Rajesh Hamal
- Rajesh Khanna
- Rajinikanth
- Rajkumar
- Ram
- Ram Charan
- Ramesh Aravind
- Ranjit Mallick
- Ravi Teja
- Riaz
- Rishi Kapoor
- Ritesh Deshmukh
- Saif Ali Khan
- Salman Khan
- Salman Shah
- Sanjay Dutt
- Sanjeev Kumar
- Saugat Malla
- Shaan
- Shahrukh Khan
- Shakib Khan
- Shammi Kapoor
- Shamoon Abbasi
- Shankar Nag
- Siddhanta Mahapatra
- Siddharth (actor)
- Sivaji Ganeshan
- Sobhan Babu
- Sohel Rana (actor)
- Soumitra Chatterjee
- Srikanth
- Subhash Dutta
- Sunil
- Sunil Dutt
- Sunny Deol
- Suresh Gopi
- Surya Sivakumar
- Sushant Singh Rajput
- Symon Sadik
- Tapas Paul
- Tapen Chatterjee
- Thilakan
- Tulsi Chakraborty
- Upendra
- Uttam Kumar
- Uttam Mohanty
- Vidyut Jamwal
- Vijay
- Vijay Devarakonda
- Vijay Sethupathi
- Vikram
- Vinod Khanna
- Vinod Mehra
- Vishnuvardhan
- Vivek Oberoi
- Waheed Murad
- Wasim
- Zafar Iqbal

=== Actresses ===
- Achol
- Aishwarya Rai - Miss World 1994
- Aishwarya Rajesh
- Akshara Haasan
- Alia Bhatt
- Alisha Pradhan
- Amala Paul
- Amrita Acharia - (Game of Thrones)
- Amrita Rao
- Andrea Jeremiah
- Anjali (film actress)
- Anju Ghosh
- Anu Emmanuel
- Anushka Sharma
- Anushka Shetty
- Aparajita Mohanty
- Apu Biswas
- Archita Sahu
- Asin Thottumkal
- Ayesha Takia
- B. Saroja Devi
- Barsha Priyadarshini
- Bidya Sinha Saha Mim
- Bipasha Basu
- Bhavana Menon
- Bobby
- Bobita (Dhallywood Actress)
- Catherine Tresa
- Celina Jaitly - Miss India 2001
- Debashree Roy
- Deepika Padukone
- Devika Rani
- Dia Mirza - Miss Asia Pacific 2000
- Diana Hayden - Miss World 1997
- Dimple Kapadia
- Divya Spandana (Ramya)
- Esha Gupta
- Genelia
- Hansika Motwani
- Hema Malini
- Ileana D'Cruz
- Jaya Bachchan
- Jaya Prada
- Jayasudha
- Jayanthi
- Juhi Chawla - Miss India 1984
- Kajal Aggarwal
- Kajol
- Kangana Ranaut
- Kareena Kapoor
- Karishma Kapoor
- Karishma Manandhar
- Katrina Kaif
- Keerthy Suresh
- Keki Adhikari
- Kiara Advani
- Koel Mallick
- Lakshmi Menon
- Lakshmi Rai
- Lara Dutta - Miss Universe 2000
- Madhubala
- Madhuri Dixit
- Mahiya Mahi
- Manisha Koirala
- Mahira Khan
- Manju Warrier
- Meena
- Meena Kumari
- Meera Jasmine
- Moushumi
- Nandita Das
- Nargis
- Nayanthara
- Neha Dhupia - Miss India 2002
- Nicole Faria - Miss Earth 2010
- Nikki Galrani
- Nisha Adhikari
- Nithya Menon
- Noor Jehan
- Nutan
- Padmini
- Parvatii Nair
- Parvathy Thiruvothu
- Pooja Hegde
- Popy
- Preity Zinta
- Prema
- Priyamani
- Priyanka Chopra - Miss World 2000
- Priyanka Karki - Miss Teen
- Purnima
- Rachana Banerjee
- Rakul Preet Singh
- Ramya Krishna
- Rani Mukerji
- Rashmika Mandanna
- Regina Cassandra
- Rekha Thapa
- Rekha
- Reema Khan
- Resham
- Richa Gangopadhyay
- Ritika Singh
- Ritu Varma
- Rituparna Sengupta
- Samantha Ruth Prabhu
- Saima
- Sanjjanaa
- Savitri
- Sayyeshaa
- Shabana Azmi
- Shabana (Dhallywood actress)
- Shabnur
- Shanbam
- Sharmila Tagore
- Shobana
- Shraddha Kapoor
- Shriya Saran
- Shruti Haasan
- Smita Patil
- Soha Ali Khan
- Sonali Bendre
- Soundarya
- Sri Divya
- Sridevi
- Srividya
- Suchitra Sen
- Sushmita Sen - Miss Universe 1994
- Swastima Khadka
- Tabu
- Tamannaah
- Taapsee Pannu
- Trisha Krishnan
- Urmila Matondkar
- Urvashi
- Vidya Balan
- Vyjayanthimala
- Yukta Mookhey - Miss World 1999
- Zeenat Aman - Miss Asia Pacific 1970
- Zeba

== See also ==
- Cinema of the world
- Music of South Asia
- Alpavirama South Asian Short Film Festival (Alpavirama)
- Asian cinema
- World cinema
- Sambalpuri Cinema
- List of Hollywood-inspired nicknames
- East Asian cinema
- Southeast Asian cinema
