= Shrawan Ghimire =

Indian actor and filmmaler (born 1961)

- Born: 1 July 1961 (age 65); Sindebong, West Bengal, India
- Occupations: Film actor; producer; director; screenwriter; actor; editor; playback singer; lyricist
- Years active: 1989-2001
- Children: 1
- Relatives: Tulsi Ghimire (brother)

Shrawan Ghimire (born 1 July 1961) is an Indian film actor, producer, director, screenwriter, editor and playback singer and lyricist associated with Nepali cinema. Ghimire has been involved in many commercially successful films including Lahure, Dui Thopa Aansu and Darpan Chaya. He and his brother Tulsi Ghimire's pair is regarded as the most successful and qualitative producer−director pair in Nepali cinema.

== Early life ==
Shrawan Ghimire was born on 1 July 1961, in Sindebong, Kalimpong district (then Darjeeling district), West Bengal, India, into an Indian Gorkha family to father Dhojman Ghimire and mother Narbada Ghimire. His brother, Tulsi Ghimire, is a prominent director and producer.

== Filmography ==
Shrawan Ghimire's career in the Nepali film industry began in the mid-1980s. He gained widespread recognition for his roles in films such as Kusume Rumal (1986) and Lahure (1989), which were both critically acclaimed and commercially successful. His collaboration with his brother Tulsi Ghimire led to the production of several notable films, including Darpan Chhaya (2001), which became the highest-grossing Nepali film at the time.

Beyond acting, Shrawan Ghimire has contributed to the industry in various capacities. He has served as a producer, playback singer, lyricist, and even as a legal advisor and production manager on several projects.

Ghimire has been cast in movies such as:

Year	Film title	Title meaning	Starring	Ghimire's work
1989	Lahure	Soldier	Shrawan Ghimire, Tripti Nadakar, Tulsi Ghimire	Actor, producer
1989	Chino	Emblem	Shiva Shrestha, Sunil Thapa	Producer
1991	Deuta	God	Rajesh Hamal, Sirjana Basnet, Yubraj Lama	Actor
1992	Koseli	Gift	Krishna Malla, Tripti Nadakar, Vijaya Lama, Bharati Ghimire	Actor
1994	Dakshina	Teacher’s debt discharged	Tulsi Ghimire, Bhuwan K.C., Niruta Singh	Producer
2001	Darpan Chaya	Reflection	Dilip Rayamajhi, Niruta Singh, Uttam Pradhan	Producer
2002	Lahana	Coincidence	Dilip Rayamajhi, Niruta Singh, Uttam Pradhan	Producer
2007	Dui Kinara	Two banks of river	Niruta Singh, Nikhil Upreti	Producer
2023	Rahar			

== See also ==
- Cinema of Nepal
