= Anyay =

- अन्याय
- Directed by: Tulsi Ghimire
- Written by: Bishwa Basnet
- Screenplay by: Tulsi Ghimire
- Story by: Bishwa Basnet
- Produced by: Bishwa Basnet
- Starring: Bishwa Basnet; Prakash Adhikari; Mira Madhuri
- Cinematography: Pramod Pradhan
- Edited by: Tulsi Ghimire
- Music by: Ranjit Gazmer
- Release date: October 30, 1989 (Nepal)
- Country: Nepal
- Language: Nepali

Anyay (Nepali: अन्याय English: Injustice) is a Nepali family drama film released on October 30, 1989. Directed and edited by Tulsi Ghimire, the film was produced under the banner of Sagarmatha Movietone. The film marks the prominent silver-screen debuts of lead actors Prakash Adhikari and Mira Madhuri. Upon its theatrical release, the film emerged as a commercial success and remains a classic of the golden era of Nepalese cinema.

== Plot ==
Anyay is a family drama that revolves around themes of societal injustice, personal vengeance, and moral uprightness within contemporary Nepalese society. The narrative follows the struggles of its central characters as they battle systemic corruption and domestic turmoil.

== Cast ==
- Bishwa Basnet
- Prakash Adhikari (debut)
- Mira Madhuri (debut)
- B.S. Rana
- Mohan Niraula
- Jayanendra Chand
- Mukunda Shrestha
- Geetanjali Sunwar

== Production ==
The film's concept and story were developed by veteran actor Bishwa Basnet, who also served as the primary producer for the project. Director Tulsi Ghimire handled the screenplay, dialogues, and final film editing, maintaining his signature style of blending emotional family dynamics with commercial storytelling elements. Pramod Pradhan served as the director of photography, while Gopal Bhutani directed the action sequences and Basanta Shrestha choreographed the dance numbers.

== Soundtrack ==
The musical score and soundtrack of the film were composed by acclaimed music director Ranjit Gazmer. The lyrics were penned by Pradip Rimal, Ranjit Gazmer, and Kiran Kharel. The playback singing featured prominent voices from the South Asian music industry, including Prem Dhoj Pradhan, Bhupendra Singh, Deepa Jha, Manila Sotang, and Sushma Shrestha (Poornima).

=== Track listing ===
No.	Title	Lyricist	Singer(s)	Length
1.	"Jhimkyaideu Pareli"	Kiran Kharel	Prem Dhoj Pradhan, Sushma Shrestha	
2.	"Ishara Le Bolaunu Pardaina"	Ranjit Gazmer	Bhupendra Singh, Deepa Jha	
3.	"Jhumi Jhumi Boldachha"	Pradip Rimal	Manila Sotang	
4.	"Adhar Ma Aaja Unkai Chha Geet"	Kiran Kharel	Deepa Jha	
5.	"Man Chhade Maichyang Lai"	Ranjit Gazmer	Bhupendra Singh	
