= Mayalu (film) =

- Directed by: Shambhu Pradhan
- Produced by: Sumitra Poudel; Shambhu Pradhan
- Starring: Bhuwan K.C. Karishma Manandhar
- Music by: Ranjit Gazmer
- Release date: November 20, 1988 (Nepal)
- Running time: 138 minutes
- Country: Nepal
- Language: Nepali

Mayalu (Nepali: मायालु}}) is a 1988 Nepali romantic drama film directed and co-produced by Shambhu Pradhan. Starring Bhuwan K.C. and Karishma Manandhar in lead roles, the film is considered a classic of late-1980s Nepalese cinema.

== Plot ==
The film follows a young man (Bhuwan K.C.) who falls in love with a woman (Karishma Manandhar). Their relationship faces obstacles from societal norms, class differences, and family pressures, leading to themes of sacrifice and enduring love.

== Cast ==
- Bhuwan K.C. as Lead Actor
- Karishma Manandhar as Lead Actress
- Harihar Sharma
- Tika Pahari

== Soundtrack ==
The music was composed by Ranjit Gazmer, with songs featuring vocals by Asha Bhosle and Prem Dhoj Pradhan. Popular tracks include "Tadha Bhaigayau Feri" and "Ko Hola Mero (Chanchale)".
