= Jhoda =

- झोड़ा
- Directed by: Barun Kawasi
- Starring: Banni Pradhan; Rani Dixit; Tanka Sharma; Madhumita Mukherjee; Bhanu Ramudamu; Dilip Ray; Laxmi Pradhan; Narbu Rumba
- Music by: Ranjit Gazmer
- Production company: Kusulata Enterprises
- Release date: March 23, 1987 (Nepal)
- Country: Nepal
- Language: Nepali

Jhoda (also spelled Jhodaa) is a 1987 Nepali social drama film directed by Barun Kawasi and produced under the banner of Kusulata Enterprises. The film stars an ensemble cast including Banni Pradhan, Rani Dixit, Tanka Sharma, and Madhumita Mukherjee. The film's music was composed by the prominent musician Ranjit Gazmer.

Set against the backdrop of rural Nepal in the 1980s, the narrative explores the deep-seated socioeconomic divisions, rural poverty, and systemic injustices faced by marginalized farming families under regional landlords.

== Plot ==
The film revolves around a hardworking young man from a rural village who is known by the nickname "Jhoda," a moniker reflecting both his socioeconomic standing and the hardships he has inherited. Despite being raised in a household severely limited by poverty, debts, and rigid rural social hierarchies, Jhoda is defined by his deep sense of self-respect, honesty, and determination.

As local feudal landlords and economic pressures push his family further into distress, Jhoda steps up as the moral and practical anchor of his household, striving to protect his family's dignity. The narrative reaches its peak as Jhoda faces a heavy internal conflict, forced to choose between maintaining his unyielding personal honor and ensuring the literal survival of the people he loves.

== Cast ==
- Banni Pradhan as Jhoda
- Rani Dixit
- Tanka Sharma
- Madhumita Mukherjee
- Bhanu Ramudamu
- Dilip Ray
- Laxmi Pradhan
- Narbu Rumba

== Soundtrack ==
The soundtrack of the film was composed by Ranjit Gazmer, a veteran music composer known for introducing the madal instrument into mainstream Bollywood and defining early Nepali cinema music. The playback singing features vocals by notable artists of the era.

Track listing
No.	Title	Singer(s)	Length
1.	"Naya Naya Pirati"	Sushma Shrestha

== Release ==
Jhoda was released in commercial theaters across Nepal on March 23, 1987. It is regarded by film historians as a significant release from the 1980s wave of socially conscious Nepali cinema, praised for capturing authentic emotional weights and rural struggles of contemporary Nepalese society rather than relying solely on commercial tropes.
