= Darpan Chhaya 2 =

- Theatrical Released Poster
- Original title: दर्पण छायाँ २
- Directed by: Tulsi Ghimire
- Produced by: Sabu Gadal Karki; Ravi Karki; Shraddha Prasai; B.S. Rana; Bharati Ghimire; Tulsi Ghimire; Saroj Khanal; Shiva Shrestha
- Starring: Pushpall Khadka; Sahara Karki
- Cinematography: Rameshwor Karki
- Music by: Ranjit Gazmer; Chandan Lomjel
- Release date: 10 March 2017 (Nepal)
- Running time: 2h 40m
- Country: Nepal
- Language: Nepali

'Darpan Chhaya 2' (Nepali: दर्पण छायाँ २) is a 2017 Nepalese drama film with Tulsi Ghimire's direction. It is the sequel to the blockbuster Nepalese film Darpan Chaya written by Tulsi Ghimire and released in 2001. The film stars Pushpal Khadka, Sahara Karki, Shiv Shrestha and Tulsi Ghimire. The film was considered hugely inferior to its predecessor and the film was a massive disaster at the box office.

== Plot ==
The movie starts in the US, where Nisha is invited to a Nepalese music festival. She remembers her friends from Nepal, especially Aalap and Sargam. Aalap, a saxophonist and Sargam, a singer and dancer were in love. After a college event, their musical group is offered a gig by a music company on condition that Aalap play the saxophone. However, Aalap doesn't own his own saxophone. Sargam and her friend Keshar plan to surprise Aalap by gifting him one on his birthday. Sargam's father disapproves of Aalap's humble background. The group sign a contract with the company. On Aalap's birthday, Nisha beats Sargam and gifts Aalap a saxophone leaving Sargam heartbroken.

At his party Aalap faints as he plays the saxophone. At the hospital, Nisha collects Aalap's reports and discovers that he has a broken bone and should not play the saxophone. She realises that he suffered the damage in the accident that killed his parents and that she was responsible for. At the concert, Nisha tries her best to convince Aalap to not play the instrument. A desperate Nisha recruits Sargam's father to stop Aalap. Aalap overhears Nisha confessing her role in the accident and Aalap's condition. Conflicted if he should play, Aalap talks to Sargam and decides to go onstage determined to fulfil his dead parents' wish, but bleeds out and dies. Later, Nisha and Sargam's father find Sargam dead as well.

== Cast ==
- Pushpall Khadka as Aalap
- Sahara Karki as Sargam
- Shraddha Prasai as Nisha
- B.S. Rana as Bada
- Bharati Ghimire as Gopi's Wife
- Tulsi Ghimire as Gopi Guru
- Saroj Khanal as Sargam's father
- Shiv Shrestha as himself (cameo appearance)
- Uttam Pradhan as himself (cameo appearance)

== Soundtrack ==
Darpan Chhaya 2 Soundtrack
No.	Title	Singer(s)	Length
1.	"Aakashai Ma"	Rajesh Payal Rai, Melina Rai	4:23
2.	"Yo Janam"	Melina Rai, Ashok Dhamala, Shiva Pariyar	4:11
3.	"Taranga Naulo"	Melina Rai, Karma Gyalchen	4:40
4.	"Lahana Le Jurayo Ki"	Melina Rai	3:17
Total length:			15:91

Darpan Chhaya 2's music is directed by Nepalese musicians Ranjit Gazmer and Chandan Lomjel. The music has revived very positive feedback from Nepalese people but some people said this is for 80s and 90s people.

The music is sung by well regarded Nepalese singers Rajesh Payal Rai, Melina Rai, Ashok Dhamala, Karma Gyaljen, Shiva Pariyar.
