= Balidaan (1997 film) =

1997 Nepali historical drama film, directed by Tulsi Ghimire

- DVD cover of Balidaan
- Directed by: Tulsi Ghimire
- Written by: Modanath Prasrit
- Produced by: Shyam Sapkota
- Starring: Hari Bansha Acharya; Anjali Lama; Madan Krishna Shrestha; Shanti Maskey; Keshav Bhattarai; Laxmi Giri; Neer Shah
- Production company: Cinema Nepal
- Distributed by: Pashupati Records
- Release date: 1997
- Country: Nepal
- Language: Nepali

Balidaan (Sacrifice) is a 1997 Nepali historical drama film, directed by Tulsi Ghimire, and written by Modanath Prasrit. It was produced by Shyam Sapkota under the banner of Cinema Nepal. Widely regarded as one of the greatest movie of all time in the history of Nepalese Cinema, The film is set in Panchayat-era Nepal, and depicts a fictionalised version of the contemporary democracy movement. It features Hari Bansha Acharya in the lead role, alongside Anjali Lama, Madan Krishna Shrestha, Shanti Maskey, Keshav Bhattarai, Laxmi Giri and Neer Shah. The film was a critical and commercial success during the time of its release.

== Plot ==
One day, a rebel dies following an altercation with police officers on campus. Bikram (B.S. Rana), the leader of the revolutionary group, mourns the death of the rebel and instructs the other revolutionaries to go into hiding in different areas of Nepal to avoid capture by the police. Sangita (Anjali Lama) arrives in Sirani village, where she meets Arjun (Hari Bansha Acharya), a young student. She informs him that Bikram has been arrested. Together, they work to raise awareness of people's rights through their songs.

The group is preparing for a revolution against the Panchayat system. Meanwhile, Arjun and Sangita visit another village to raise awareness of democracy. En route, they encounter a retired captain, Madan Krishna Shrestha, who is unconvinced by their plan. The captain tries to persuade the village headman to allow inter-caste marriage, but he refuses. The captain advises the revolutionary group to arrange an inter-caste marriage to change the head's mind. Arjun and Sangita decide to marry each other, but another group member secretly loves Sangita. He informs the police of their plan.

Arjun is arrested and tortured by Senior Police Inspector Karna, played by Neer Shah. The court sentences him to 10 years in jail. As he leaves the courtroom, Arjun spits at the minister who had demanded the death penalty. Later, Karna is impressed by Arjun's beliefs. The officer tells Arjun that he will be released if he apologises for spitting on the minister and reveals the names of those involved in the revolutionary group, but he refuses. While being transferred to Palpa prison, Arjun breaks free from the police car. The police then break up a fight between the revolutionaries, and Arjun is killed by Karna, who ends his pain by killing him. Karna is also killed by the captain, and in his final moments, he pays his respects to Arjun by saluting him. Sangita gives birth to a child at the scene of the fight, and the film ends with a song about how Arjun gave up his life for his country.

== Cast ==
- Hari Bansha Acharya as Arjun Nepali
- Anjali Lama as Sangita
- Keshav Bhattarai as Keshav
- B.S. Rana as Bikram Sir
- Neer Shah as SP Karna Dhoj
- Madan Krishna Shrestha as Retired Captain
- Laxmi Giri as Arjun's Mother
- Rajaram Poudel as Sub-inspector
- Ramchandra Adhikari as Hawaldar Chandra Bahadur
- Kiran K.C. as Bohora Sir
- Ram Krishna Bajgain as Sagar
- Shanti Maskey as Sumita's Mother
- Nilkaji Shakya as zonal magistrate

== Soundtrack ==
Original Motion Picture Soundtrack
No.	Title	Lyrics	Music	Singer(s)	Length
1.	"Aayau Aayau"	Ramesh Shrestha	Ramesh Shrestha	Ramesh Shrestha, Manoj Gajurel	2:55
2.	"Chameli"	Ramesh Shrestha	Ramesh Shrestha	Lochan Bhattarai	3:21
3.	"Gaun Gaun Bata Utha"			Ramesh Shrestha, Om Shrestha, Sunita Subba	4:44
4.	"Hamro Adamya Kranti"		Ramesh Shrestha	Ramesh Shrestha, Om Shrestha, Lochan Bhattarai	7:10
5.	"Hamro Nepalma"			Ramesh Shrestha, Om Shrestha	3:08
6.	"Horra"	Chetnarayan Rai	Chetnarayan Rai	Chetnarayan Rai, Manoj Gajurel	5:55
7.	"Rakta Krantiko Jwalamukhi"		Ramesh Shrestha	Ramesh, Kumar Kanchha, Lochan Bhattarai	3:41

== Banning ==
The film was released in 1997. In September 2005, it was banned by the government of Nepal for its portrayal of Nepal's communist movement. Sudeshna Sarkar of Two Circles wrote: "Balidan portrayed the Communist movement of Nepal and was banned five years ago when King Gyanendra seized absolute power with the help of the army and jailed Nepal's top politicians". The song "Gaun Gaun Bata Utha" was adopted by the Communist Party of Nepal (Unified Marxist–Leninist). It was previously released during the Panchayat era, composed by Shyam Tamot, and had been banned from state-owned Radio Nepal. Balidaan became a blockbuster, and was praised by the audiences for its revolutionary theme, and for the film's touching songs.

In May 2015, the film was screened on satellite television station Dish Home.

== Critical reception ==
The staff of NepaliSansar cited the film as one of the "best Nepali movies ever", alongside Chino, Darpan Chhaya, Kusume Rumal, Lahure, and Desh. Kamal Subedi of Republica said: "Balidan is one of the successful movies of all time". The staff of BossNepal wrote: "It is a good movie to catch up if you are willing to get a glimpse of what surpassed among the people of Nepal during the democratic movement". The staff of La.Lit wrote: "Balidan, [...] was a tearjerker perfectly poised between the fall of Panchayat and the start of the Maoist revolution".
