= Balidaan =

Balidaan or Balidan may refer to:

- Balidan, a 1927 Indian silent drama film directed by Naval Gandhi and written by Rabindranath Tagore, starring Ruby Mayer, Zubeida and Master Vithal
- Balidaan (1971 film), a 1971 Indian Hindi-language drama film by Ravi Tandon, starring Manoj Kumar and Saira Banu
- Balidaan (1985 film), a 1985 Indian Hindi-language action film by S.A. Chandra Shekaran, starring Jeetendra, Sridevi and music composed by Bappi Lahari
- Balidaan (1997 film), a 1997 Nepalese historical-drama film

== See also ==
- Balidan Stambh, memorial for killed in action military, paramilitary, police personnel in Jammu, India
