= Siudo Ko Sindoor =

2001 Nepali film

- Directed by: Manju Kumar Shrestha
- Written by: Surendra Nakarmi
- Produced by: Manju Kumar Shrestha
- Music by: Sambhujit Baskota
- Release date: 12 October 2001 (Nepal)
- Country: Nepal
- Language: Nepali

Siudo ko Sindor (Nepali: सिउदो को सिन्दूर) is a 2001 Nepali film directed by Manju Kumar Shrestha, which tells the story of a Nepalese girl who can easily break off a marriage for money or hope.

== Cast ==
- Rajesh Hamal as Rajesh
- Niruta Singh as Menuka
- Jharana Bajracharya as Dwiti
- Neer Shah as Javinder Dhan Veer
- Ratan Subedi as Rajesh's Sister
- Basundhara Bhushal as Rajesh's Mother

== Music ==
| Song | Singer(s) | Writer | Duration |
|---|---|---|---|
| Na ta maya thaha Chha | | Karun Thapa | 4:40 |
| Kohi Neelo Jeans ma | | Karun Thapa | 3:59 |

== See also ==
- Cinema of Nepal
- List of Nepalese films
