= Thuldai =

- ठुल्दाई
- Directed by: Dayaram Dahal
- Story by: Sunita Bajgain
- Produced by: Drupada Bajagai Ram Krishna Bajgain
- Starring: Shiv Shrestha; Jal Shah; Niruta Singh; Sunil Thapa; Dayaram Dahal
- Cinematography: Sambhu Sapkota
- Production company: Jaya Chamunda Mai Films
- Distributed by: Jaya Chamunda Mai Films
- Release date: 1 November 1999 (Nepal)
- Running time: 138 min
- Country: Nepal
- Language: Nepali

Thuldai (Nepali: ठुल्दै, translation: Big Brother) is a 1999 Nepali film directed by Dayaram Dahal and features music by Shambhujeet Baskota. The film's cast includes Jal Shah, Shiv Shrestha, Niruta Singh, and Sunil Thapa.

== Cast ==
- Shiv Shrestha
- Jal Shah
- Niruta Singh
- Sunil Thapa
- Narendra Thapa
- Laxmi Giri
- Roshan Shrestha
- Dayaram Dahal

== See also ==
- Cinema of Nepal
- List of Nepalese films
