= Kusume Rumal 2 =

2009 Nepali film

- Directed by: Nirak Poudel
- Written by: Pradip Bhardwaj
- Produced by: Ujwal Poudel, Nikita Poudel, Nirak Poudel, Niraj Poudel
- Release date: 2009
- Country: Nepal
- Language: Nepali

Kusume Rumal 2 (Nepali: कुसुमे रुमाल २, translation: Pink Handkerchief 2) is a 2009 Nepali romantic film directed by Nirak Poudel, son of veteran Nepali producer Uddab Poudel. This is not technically a sequel to the 1985 film Kusume Rumal but pays homage to the old film and shows the next generation where the lead actress is Suniti (Tripti)'s daughter. This was the first film for Niraj Baral, Usha Rajak, and Rubi Bhattarai.

== Cast ==
- Niraj Baral
- Usha Rajak
- Rubi Bhattarai
- Tripti Nadakar
- Laxmi Giri
- Nikhil Upreti (special appearance)
