= Raju Shah =

Nepalese film director

Raju Shah राजु शाह
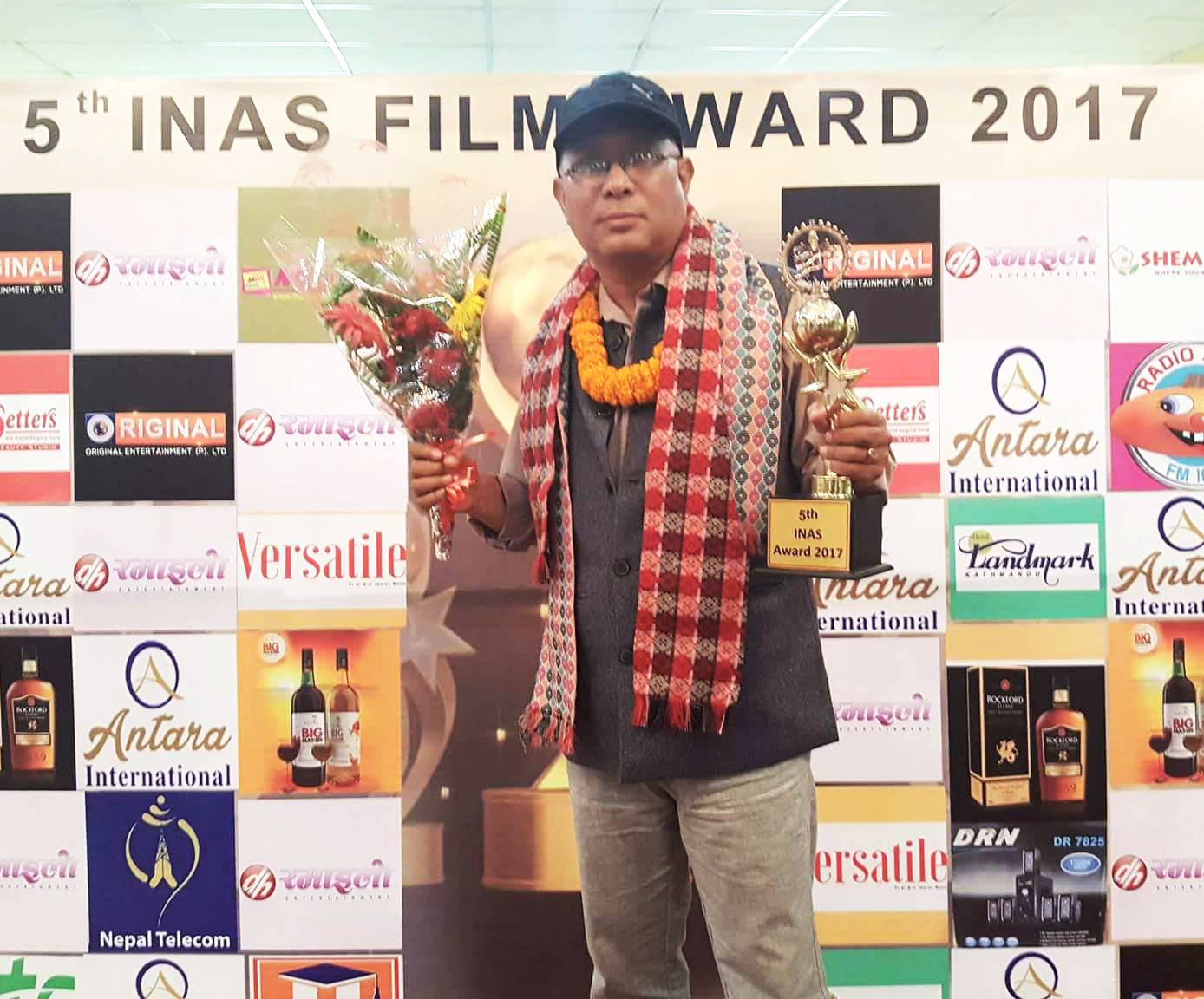
- Receiving honour for the Namaste Nepal from 5th INAS Film Awards 2017.
- Born: Rajendra Shah; 26 February 1965 (age 61); Nuwakot, Nepal
- Citizenship: Nepal
- Education: Intermediate in Law from Nepal Law Campus
- Occupations: Choreographer, Film Director, Producer
- Years active: 1992–present
- Known for: Raju Shah
- Notable work: Dui Thopa Aansu (1993 A.D)
- Spouse: Sudha Shah
- Children: Shreeju Shah; Nikhil Shah
- Parents: Narendra Bhadur Shah (father); Rajya Laxmi Shah (mother)

Raju Shah (Nepali: राजु शाह; born 26 February 1965 A.D) is a Nepalese Choreographer, Director, Producer. He is a nationally renowned choreographer and film director. Shah is also founder chairman of Nepal Film Dance Association and Film Dance Choreographer Association, Nepal. He started his film career as a dancer of Nepali features film Badalindo Aakash in 1982 and later started working as a choreographer from 1992 A.D in Nepali feature film Dui Thopa Aansu. Shah has directed more than 200 Nepali films as choreographer. He has also directed two feature film, "Sapanako Naulo Sansar" and "Namaste Nepal". Namaste Nepal is one of the first Nepali feature film which was fully picturised in Europe.

== Awards ==
Year	Award	Category	Work	Result
1994	San miguel Film Award Best Dance Director	Choreographer	Dui Thopa Aansu	Won
2001	Gitangali Cine Award Best Dance Director	Choreographer	Sagun	Won
2001	Nepali Motion Picture Award	Choreographer	Aafnomanchhe	Won
2005	Gorkha Daksina Bahu (By former King Gyanendra Bir Bikram Shah Dev	Choreographer		Won
2011	CG Digital film Awards 2011	Choreographer	Kasle Choryo Mero Man	Won
