= Deuta =

Nepali film

- Theatrical Release Poster
- Directed by: Tulsi Ghimire
- Written by: Tulsi Ghimire
- Produced by: Karsang Lama
- Starring: Rajesh Hamal; Srijana Basnet
- Cinematography: Raju Shah
- Edited by: Tulsi Ghimire
- Music by: Ranjit Gazmer
- Release date: 30 April 1993
- Running time: 149 minutes
- Country: Nepal
- Language: Nepali
- Budget: Rs 30 lakhs

Deuta (Nepali: देउता; lit. 'God') is a Nepali film written and directed by Tulsi Ghimire and released in 1993. It starred Rajesh Hamal, Shrawan Ghimire and Srijana Basnet in lead roles. Many consider the performance by Rajesh Hamal was his career best and the movie that made Rajesh Hamal a super star. The film met with extremely positive response from audience for its story, music and performance of Rajesh Hamal but critics criticised its runtime. The movie was a blockbuster hit at the box office. The film was the highest grossing film of the year and one of the highest grossing film of 1990s. The film won Hamal many awards for his performance. The movie remain cult classic and is popular till today esp. its songs and dialogues of Rajesh Hamal.

Hamal stated also stated that Deuta film will always be remembered in his heart, as he recalls the demise of his father while shooting the movie. It was a debut film for the actress Srijana Basnet. The movie had celebrated 51 days on many theaters in Nepal with housefull shows.

== Plot ==
The film starts with the marriage discussion of Srijana (Srijana Basnet), an amateur painter with her father (Tulsi ghimire). She hesitates to marry the only son of her father's business partner. Instead she wants to learn some more painting and go to visit her paternal aunt in a remote village, where she meets Sonam (Shrawan Ghimire) and Shankar (Rajesh Hamal). A love triangle starts among the three and flows through the course of time.

== Cast ==
- Rajesh Hamal as Shankar
- Shrawan Ghimire as Sonam
- Srijana Basnet as Srijana
- Tulsi Ghimire as Srijana's father
- Yuvaraj Lama as Nima

== Music ==
No.	Title	Singer(s)	Length
1.	"Piratiko Mitho Tirsana"	Indrajeet Mijar, Bharati Ghimire	5:41
2.	"K Vanne Hamro Samaya"	Indrajeet Mijar	4:14
3.	"Aba Yo Bato"	Indrajeet Mijar	4;41

The music of the film was composed by Ranjit Gazmer. The lyrics were written by Kusum Gazmer and Tulsi Ghimire. The songs of Deuta became very popular at the time, particularly Piratiko Meetho Tirsana sung by Prakash Shreshta and Sadhana Sargam and Aba Yo Baato sung by Indrajeet Mijhar.

Songs like "K Vanne Hamro Samaya" were widely popular and after many decades bands like Anuprastha covered the song.
