= Pheri Bhetaula =

- Directed by: Phurpa Chhiring Gurung
- Story by: Phurpa Chiring Gurung
- Starring: Prakash Adhikari; Manisha Koirala
- Cinematography: Deepak Dhakal
- Edited by: Raj Bikram Shah
- Music by: Ranjit Gazmer
- Production company: Himchuli Films
- Release date: 1989
- Country: Nepal
- Language: Nepali

Pheri Bhetaula (Nepali: फेरी भेटौला, English: See you again) is a 1989 Nepali romantic film. The cast includes the debutant Manisha Koirala and Prakash Adhikari. The music of this movie was composed by Ranjit Gazmer. This was the last Nepali film that Manisha appeared in, until her marriage in 2010 and return to her country's film industry almost 2 decades later.

== Cast ==
- Manisha Koirala
- Mohan Niraula
- Sabita Shahi
- Prakash Adhikari
- Ratan Thapa
- Pragya Ratna Bajracharya
- Parvati Adhikari
- Ravi Shah
- Kuldip Serchan
- Laxmi Giri
- Manoj Gurung

== Soundtrack ==
No.	Title	Singer(s)	Length
1.	"Mohani Maya Ko Ho Ki"	Deepa Jha, Kumar Kancha	4:18
2.	"Timi Chhau Kaha"	Deepa Jha, Indrajeet Mijar	5:02
3.	"Hera Na Hera Kancha"	Aruna Lama, Jitendra Bardewa.	3:14
