= Usha Rajak =

Nepali actress and model

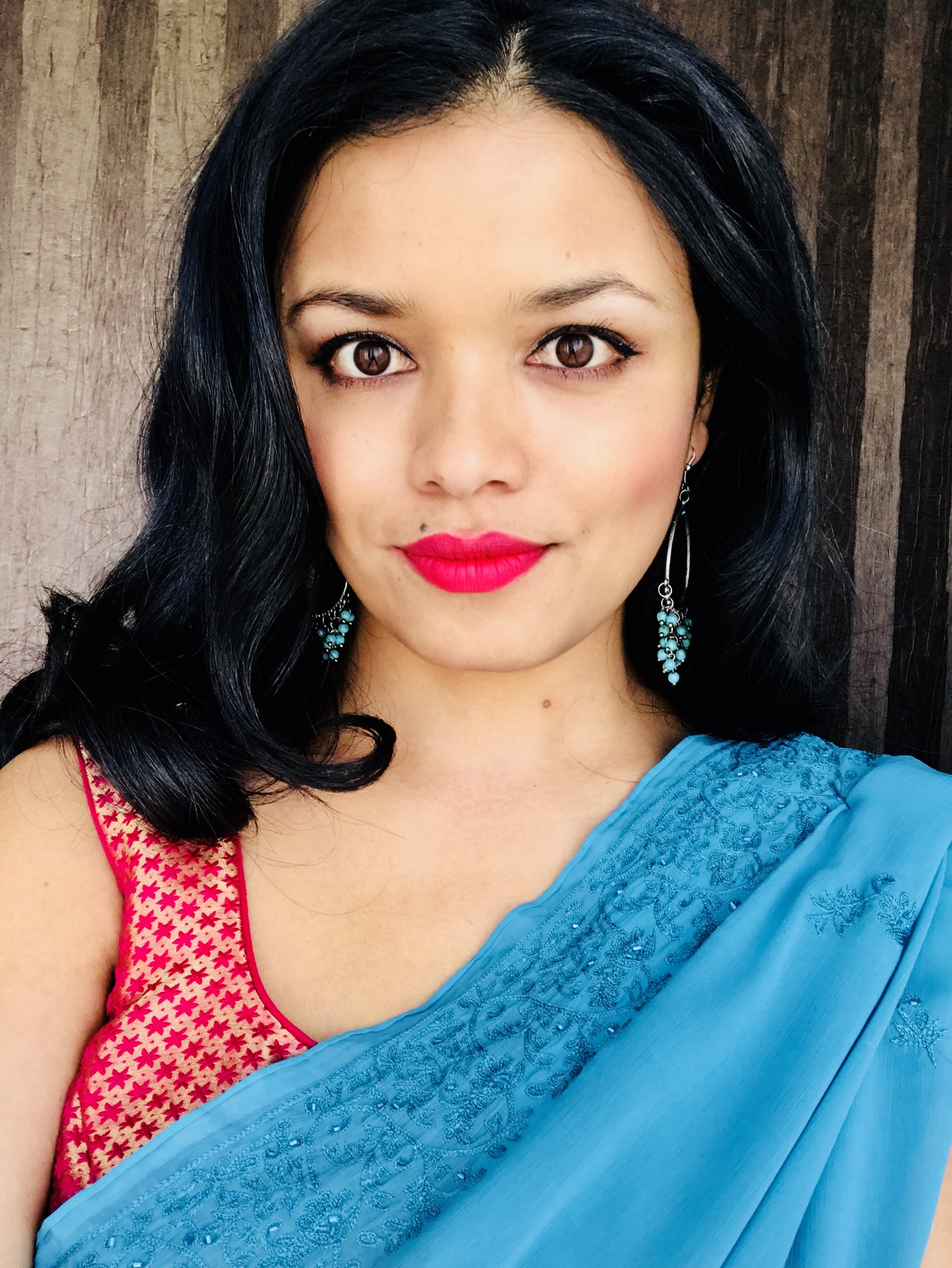
- Born: 18 October 1985 (age 41); Lalitpur, Nepal
- Occupations: Actress, model
- Years active: 2004–present
- Title: Sunsilk Miss Beautiful Hair (2004) and Miss World University of Nepal (2007)

Usha Rajak (Nepali: उषा रजक; born 18 October 1985) is a Nepalese actress, model, pastry chef and Nepal's representative for World Miss University 2006. Rajak also won the title of Mrs Nepal International 2021.

== Early life ==
Usha Rajak was born on 18 October 1985 in Lalitpur, Nepal to Bhuvan Rajak and Shashi Rajak. In 2002, she graduated with a School Level Certificate from Baal Vidhya Secondary High School. Following her high school graduation, Usha studied Commerce at Prasadi Academy, from which she received an Intermediate Certificate in 2004.

== Career ==
Her first major beauty pageant was Lux Beauty Star 2004, at which she won the title of Sunsilk Miss Beautiful Hair. Later, she worked as a runway model for brands Jawed Habib and Lakme Cosmetics. She was also featured on the covers of Wave and Lifestyle magazine.

Following the success of her debut performance, Usha began honing her acting skills at Actor's Studio Nepal's theatre training program, at which she worked with directors such as Anup Baral. During one of the studio's performances, she was spotted by film director Nirak Poudel who then offered her a leading role in his upcoming film, Kusume Rumal 2.

== Beauty pageants ==
The first title she won in her modeling career was Sunsilk Miss Beautiful Hair, at Lux Beauty Star 2004, for Miss Photogenic. She then competed and won the title and represented Nepal in World Miss University, South Korea 2006. She was also able to secure the Best Actress award from the National Theatre Actors Competition held in Nepal in 2005. She later won the award for the HIV/AIDS awareness movie One Day as the Best Newcomer Actress at the Digital Film Awards, Nepal 2009. Rajak also won the title of Mrs Nepal International 2021.

== Filmography ==
Year	Title	Role	Notes	Ref
	Devi	Judge		
2023	Julebi			
2021	Kathputali-The Puppet	Shova		
2013	Katha			
2010	Kusume Rumal 2	Jenni		
2009	Iku- The Jungle Man			
2008	One Day			
