= Nai Nabhannu La 5 =

2018 Nepalese film directed by Bikash Raj Acharya

- Nepali: नाइ नभन्नु ल ५
- Directed by: Bikash Raj acharya
- Written by: Samipya Raj Timilsina; Bikash Raj Acharya
- Produced by: Haribol Bandari; Gauri Raj Joshi
- Starring: Niruta Singh; Dilip Rayamajhi; Priyanka Karki; Abishek Nepal; Keki Adhikari; Swastima Khadka
- Cinematography: Purushottam Pradhan
- Edited by: Arjun GC
- Music by: Basanta Sapkota
- Production company: One Time Cinema
- Distributed by: Budha Subba Digital Pvt Ltd
- Release date: 24 August 2018 (Nepal)
- Country: Nepal
- Language: Nepali

Nai Nabhannu La 5 (Nepali: नाइ नभन्नु ल ५, lit. 'Don't Say No 5') is a 2018 drama film, directed and written by Bikash Raj Acharya and Samipyaraj Timalsena. The film is produced by Haribol Bandari and Gauri Raj Joshi under the banner of One Time Cinema. The film stars Niruta Singh, Dilip Rayamajhi, Priyanka Karki, Keki Adhikari, Abishek Nepal, Swastima Khadka, Anubhav Regmi and Sedrina Sharma in the lead roles.

The film is part of Nai Nabhannu La film series and it is a fifth installment in the series. The film was released on 24 August 2018 in Nepal.

== Plot ==
From a young age Neer (Anubhav Regmi) and Anjana (Sedrina sharma) were in love however Anjana dies at a young age. Then, many years later Anjana's twin sister falls in love with older Neer, however Neer isn't interested in her. Anjana's sister and Neer keep walking on those streets where they used to walk. She tells him that she is his love but he does not care about her. He has no interest in her. At last, she leaves him on boat and he goes to her home to see her. However, he finds out that Anjana's sister is just sitting there and reading the diary written by him. She says she has met him only once. He then realizes that the one with whom he spent all those moments was Anjana herself. He had encountered with her spirit. He then returns to the same place and pleads with Anjana to come back. However, Anjana's sister appears there and they both hug each other.

== Cast ==
- Niruta Singh
- Dilip Rayamajhi
- Priyanka Karki as Anjana's mother
- Swastima Khadka as Ranjana/Anjana
- Keki Adhikari
- Anubhav Regmi as Neer
- Sedrina Sharma as Anjana

== Soundtrack ==
| No. | Title | Lyrics | Music | Singer(s) | Length |
|---|---|---|---|---|---|
| 1. | "Timro Aakhama Aakha Judhai" | Dinesh Thapaliya | Basanta Sapkota | Melina Rai | 4:55 |
| 2. | "Balapan Ko Umera" | Basanta Sapkota | Basanta Sapkota | Samikshya Adhikari | 3:54 |
| 3. | "Yi Aakhama Timi Chhau" | Krishna Hari Baral | Basanta Sapkota | Melina Rai | 3:06 |
| Total length: | | | | | 11:55 |

== Reception ==
The film got mostly positive reviews from Nepalese audience. The film became one of highest-grossing Nepalese film of 2018 and the film is listed 16 on highest grossing Nepali films. The film collected 4.6 million on 3 days of the film release.
