= Laxmi Giri =

Nepali actress

- लक्ष्मी गिरी
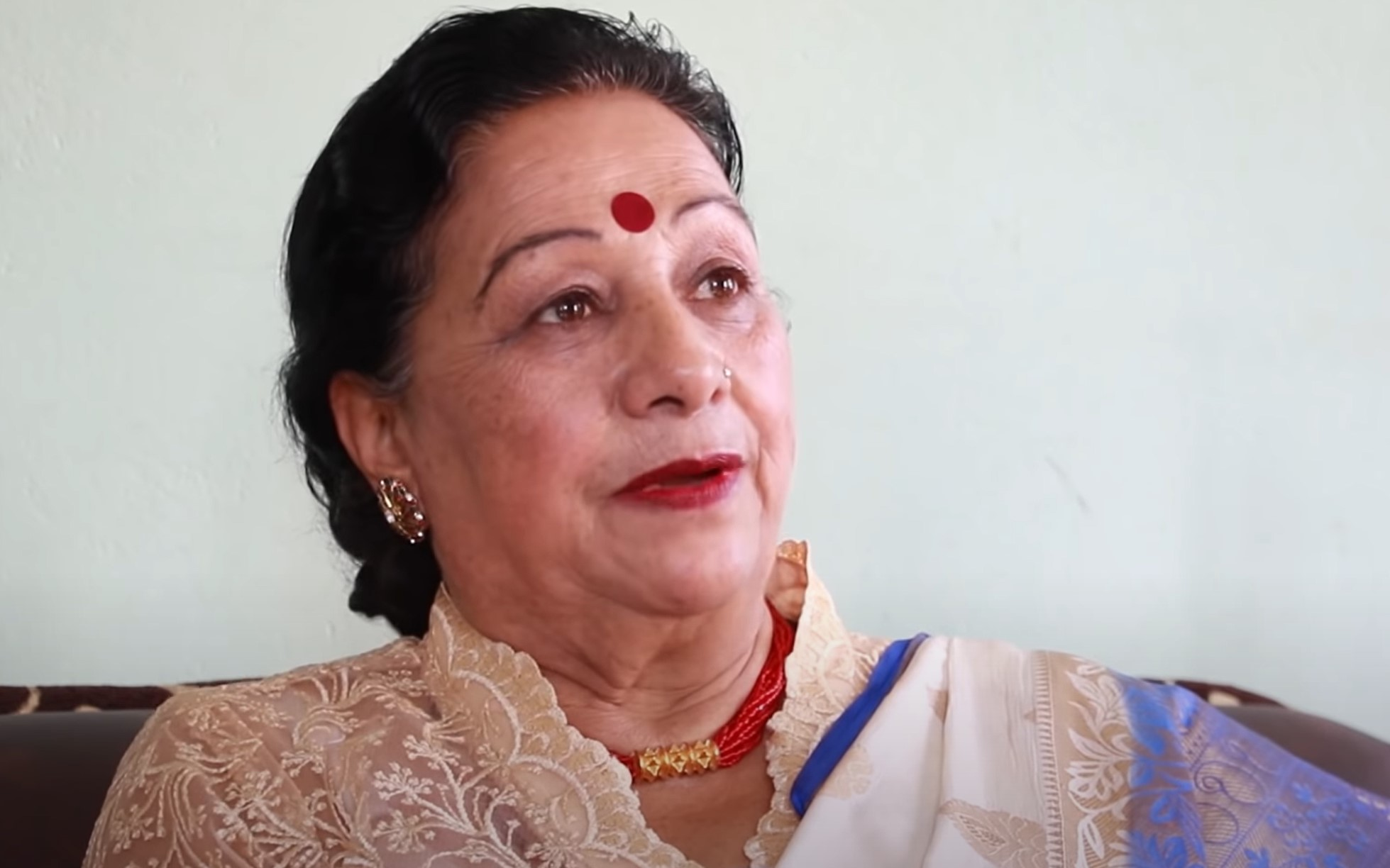
- Born: Laxmi Paudel; 12 September 1964 (age 61); Devpatan, Kathmandu
- Occupation: Actress
- Known for: Her works in Nepalese film industry
- Spouse: Ratna Kumar Giri

Laxmi Giri (Nepali: लक्ष्मी गिरी; born 12 September 1964) is a Nepalese actress whose career spans more than 35 years. She worked on stage, television and in feature films of Nepali, Newari, Maithili, Tamang and Bhojpuri languages. She appeared in more than 150 feature films, over 600 television programs (including six "mega–serials") and nearly 20 advertisements.

She started to work in television in 2042 BS, immediately after the establishment of Nepal Television. Her most notable stage role was in MaHa Jodi's Bigyapan, performing in at least 289 performances nationally and internationally, including in 35 different states in the United States, 3 countries in the United Kingdom, as well as Hong Kong and India. Her first television role was in the series April First.

== Early life ==
She was born in Devpatan, Kathmandu on 12 September 1964 (6 Magh 2011 BS) to Ujeli Adhikari and her husband Muktinath Paudel. Her birth name (given by the priest in the religious naming ceremony) is Nutan Kumari, and she was nicknamed "Bhabu", short for "Bhawani" as a child. Her father died when she was one year old. Her grandmother Dev Kumari Paudel was the first nurse to serve in Palpa District, and one of only 18 nurses, the first Nepali nurses who graduated in 2018 BS. She went to school in Pashupati Pathshala, now Sharada Secondary School. She passed SLC in 2029 BS but did not continue her studies.

She started acting at age 11, as a child actor in stage performances in Pashupati.

She married Ratna Kumar Giri in 2030 BS (1973–1974). She was employed at Nepal Rastra Bank for 16 years, before she resigned to pursue acting full-time. Her family was not appreciative of her choice to leave a secure government job to pursue a career in acting.

== Notable works ==
Her notable films include Simana, Thuldai, Darpan Chhaya, Jhola, Kusume Rumal 2, Prem Geet, Pheri Bhetaula, Teen Ghumti, Captain, Rato Tika Nidharma, Dream Girl, Chhakka Panja 2, Chhakka Panja 3, Kirtipur and Pareni Maya Jalaima, Shree Bukuro: The Home Calling, Bhagdaud, Viral Gorkhey, Mohar, Dorii, Feri Resham Filili .

SN	Year	Film	Role	Director	Reference
1	1989	Pheri Bhetaula	Cast	Phani Nepal	
2	1996	Simana	Karan's mother	Prakash Bhattabharai	
3	1999	Thuldai	Cast	Dayaram Dahal	
4	2001	Darpan Chhaya	Cast	Tulsi Ghimire	
5	2008	Kusume Rumal 2	Cast	Tulsi Ghimire	
6	2013	Jhola	Kaki	Yadav Kumar Bhattarai	
7	2016	Prem Geet	Geet's Grandmother	Sudarshan Thapa	
8	2016	Teen Ghumti	Cast	Babu Ram Dhakal	
9	2017	Chhakka Panja 2	Prajwol's mother	Deepa Shree Niraula	
10	2018	Chhakka Panja 3	Raja's mother	Deepa Shree Niraula	
11	2019	Captain	Cast	Diwakar Bhattarai	
12	2019	Dream Girl	Cast	Rishi Raj Acharya	
13	2019	Kirtipur: The Legend of Kirti Laxmi	Cast	Pradeep Khadka	
14	2019	Rato Tika Nidharma	Cast	Ashok Sharma	
15	2021	Pareni Maya Jalaima	Cast		
16	2025	Dorii	Cast		
17	2025	Feri Resham Filili	Cast		
18	2025	Mohar	Cast		
19	2025	Viral Gorkhey	Cast	Nigam Shrestha	
20	2026	Bhagdaud	Cast		
21	2026	Shree Bukuro: The Home Calling	Cast		

== Awards ==
She won Best Supporting Actress at the second NFDC National Film Awards in 2014 for her role in Jhola. She won Best Character Actress at the Film Actor's Association of Nepal (FAAN) Awards - 2072 for her role in the film Prem Geet in 2072 BS. She received the FAAN National Award in 2073 BS.

SN	Award Title	Film Name	Year	Result / Reference
1	Best Supporting Actress (2nd NFDC National Film Awards)	Jhola	2014	Won
2	Best Character Actress (Film Actor's Association of Nepal Awards)	Prem Geet	2072 BS (2016)	Won
3	FAAN National Award	—	2073 BS (2017)	Won
