= Niruta Singh =

Indian actress

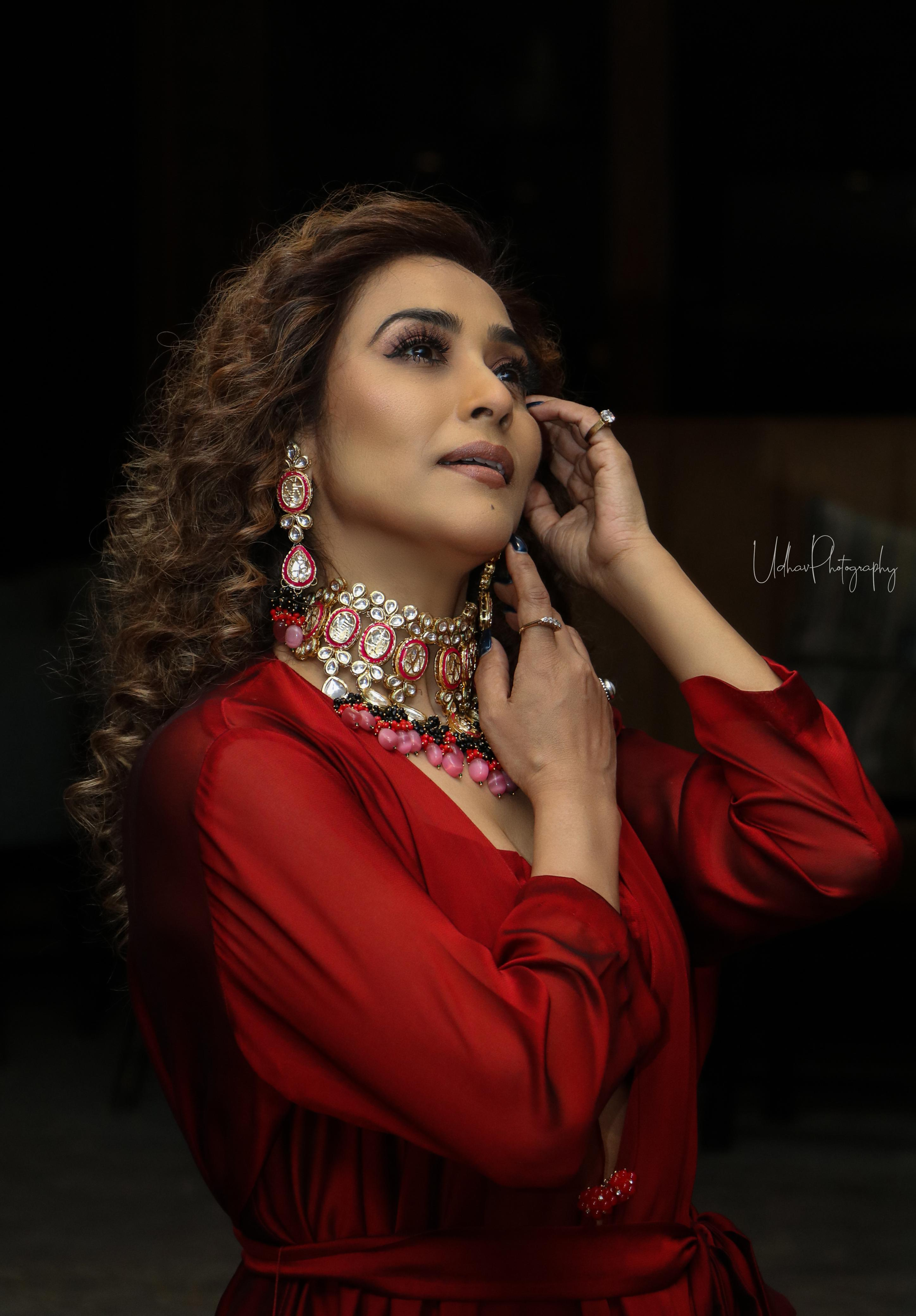
- Born: Darjeeling, West Bengal, India
- Occupations: Actress, model, singer
- Years active: 1993–present
- Spouse: Sanjeev Gulati (m. 2023)

Niruta Singh is an Indian actress, model and singer known for her work in Nepali cinema. She became a household name through her diverse roles and was the top actress of 90s and 2000s. She received wide acclaim for her performance in the 2001 film Darpan Chhaya, which became the highest-grossing film of all time in the Nepali film industry.

== Life and career ==
Niruta Singh was born in Darjeeling, India. She moved to Kathmandu after she started acting in films. Her father was a friend of director Tulsi Ghimire and it was Ghimire who brought her into the film industry with Dakshina (1993). She went on to become the only actress of the Ghimire camp, first since legendary actress Tripti Nadakar, and went on to play such hits as Rahar. Singh went on to star in the 2001 film Darpan Chaya, which was also directed by Tulsi Ghimire. Her performance received huge appreciation and Darpan Chaya went on to become a huge blockbuster of Nepali film industry, grossing NRs 700 million in 2001, the highest collection ever for a Nepali film. Singh is also a singer; she recorded the title track for director Deepak Raymajhi's NTV family drama series Vansha and later sang for a music album titled Deepshikha. As the film industry was changing, she decided to take a long break from acting and relocate to Mumbai because she did not feel that the new filmmakers were capable of the task. She made her come back to the industry through Maha Jodi's 2019 film Dal Bhaat Tarkari. In April 2023, President of Nepal awarded her one of the country’s highest civilian award, the Prabal Jana Sewa Shree.

Niruta Singh married Sanjeev Gulati on August 31, 2023, in India.

== Filmography ==
No.	Film	Note	Ref.
	Mann Mandir		
	Darpan Chhaya		
	Bandhaki		
	Dui Kinara		
	Dukha		
	Kahan Bhetiyela		
	Aamako Kakha		
	Aatankabadi		
	Aafanta		
	Chadani		
	Dui Pal		
	Maiti		
	Maili		
	Santaan Thari Thari Ka		
	Santaan		
	Khandaan		
	Aamako Aashirwaad		
	Dakshina		
	Chamatkaar		
	Aafno Manchhe		
	Aafno Pan		
	Chitkaar		
	Hami Sathi Bhai		
	Farki Aau		
	Afno ghar Aafno Maanche		
	Ko Aafno ko Birano		
	Hero		
	The Game		
	Pinjada		
	Duniya		
	Lahana		
	Ladai		
	Upakaar		
	Upahaar		
	Ajambari Maya		
	Ajambari Nata		
	Kahan Bhetiyela		
	Siudo Ko Sindoor		
	Rahar		
	Dodhar		
	Darr		
	Jiwandaan		
	Nata Ragatko		
	Aago		
	Thuldai		
	Ram Laxman		
	Kartabya		
	Lav-Kush		
	Timi Meri Hau		
	Yo kasto Prem		
	Jaan Leva		
	Dal Bhat Tarkari		
	Nai Nabhannu La 5		
	Captain		
