= Samjhana =

Samjhana (film)
- Samjhana poster
- सम्झना
- Directed by: Shambhu Pradhan
- Produced by: Ishwari Films Pvt. Ltd.
- Starring: Bhuwan K.C. Tripti Nadakar; Muralidhar
- Cinematography: Binod Pradhan
- Music by: Ranjit Gazmer
- Release date: 1983
- Running time: 106 minutes
- Country: Nepal
- Language: Nepali

Samjhana (Nepali: सम्झना) is a 1983 love story directed by Shambhu Pradhan. It starred the first golden couple of Nepali cinema, Bhuwan K.C. and Tripti Nadakar. The music of the film, composed by Ranjit Gazmer, became very popular. Binod Pradhan was the cinematographer of the film presented by Ishwori Films.

== Film ==
Tripti plays both the wife and daughter of Bhuwan in the film. The film depicts the lives of people in the tea gardens of Darjeeling, India, a large part being shot at Samsing Tea Gardens, West Bengal, India. The movie marked the debut of actress Tripti Nadakar in the Nepali film industry.

== Plot ==
The film starts with the song Dui Pate Suiro. The song is picturised on Bhuwan K.C. and Tripti Nadakar. Bhuwan plays the father role and Tripti plays the daughter role. Tripti asks about her mother to Bhuwan K.C. and he tells the story. Bhuwan K.C. visits Darjeeling, There, he meets Tripti and falls in love with her. Slowly, she too falls in love with him and they fall. But slowly time changes. Tripit Nadakar has Cancer. After giving birth to the daughter, her health gets complicated and soon she dies. Bhuwan K.C. looks after the daughter and never gets married.

== Cast & Crew ==
Director	Shambhu Pradhan
Producer	Shambhu Pradhan
Co-Producer	Kamal Pradhan
Story	Shambhu Pradhan
Asst. Director/Script	Udaya Shankhar Paadi
Screenplay	U. S. Pani
Dialogue	Pabitra Rai
Cinematographer	Binod Pradhan
Editor	Shambhu Pradhan
Lyricist	Kusum Gazmer
Music director	Ranjit Gazmer
Playback Singer	Udit Narayan Jha, Deepa Jha, Asha Bhosle, Bharati Ghimire, Kiran Pradhan
Choreographer	Shanta Nepali, Chumki Lama
Background Score	Ranjit Gazmer
Action Director	Gopal Bhutani
Sound Mixing	Mangesh Desai
Sound	Pralhaad Salvi

== Soundtrack ==
Music soundtracks of Samjhana are:

No.	Title	Singer(s)	Length
1.	"Ukali Ma Aghi Aghi"	Udit Narayan, Deepa Jha	4:35
2.	"Gahiro Gahiro Sagar Jastai"	Udit Narayan, Deepa Jha	3:08
3.	"Ke Soche Maile (male)"	Kiran Pradhan	5:55
4.	"Ke Soche Maile (female)"	Asha Bhosle	2:52
5.	"Pirati Afai Hundo Rahecha"	Udit Narayan, Asha Bhosle	2:52
6.	"Dui Pate Suiro"	Udit Narayan, Deepa Jha	4:40
7.	"Bhaileni"	Bharati Gazmer	5:21
