= Neer Shah =

Nepalese actor, songwriter and filmmaker

Neer Bikram Shah
- नीर विक्रम शाह
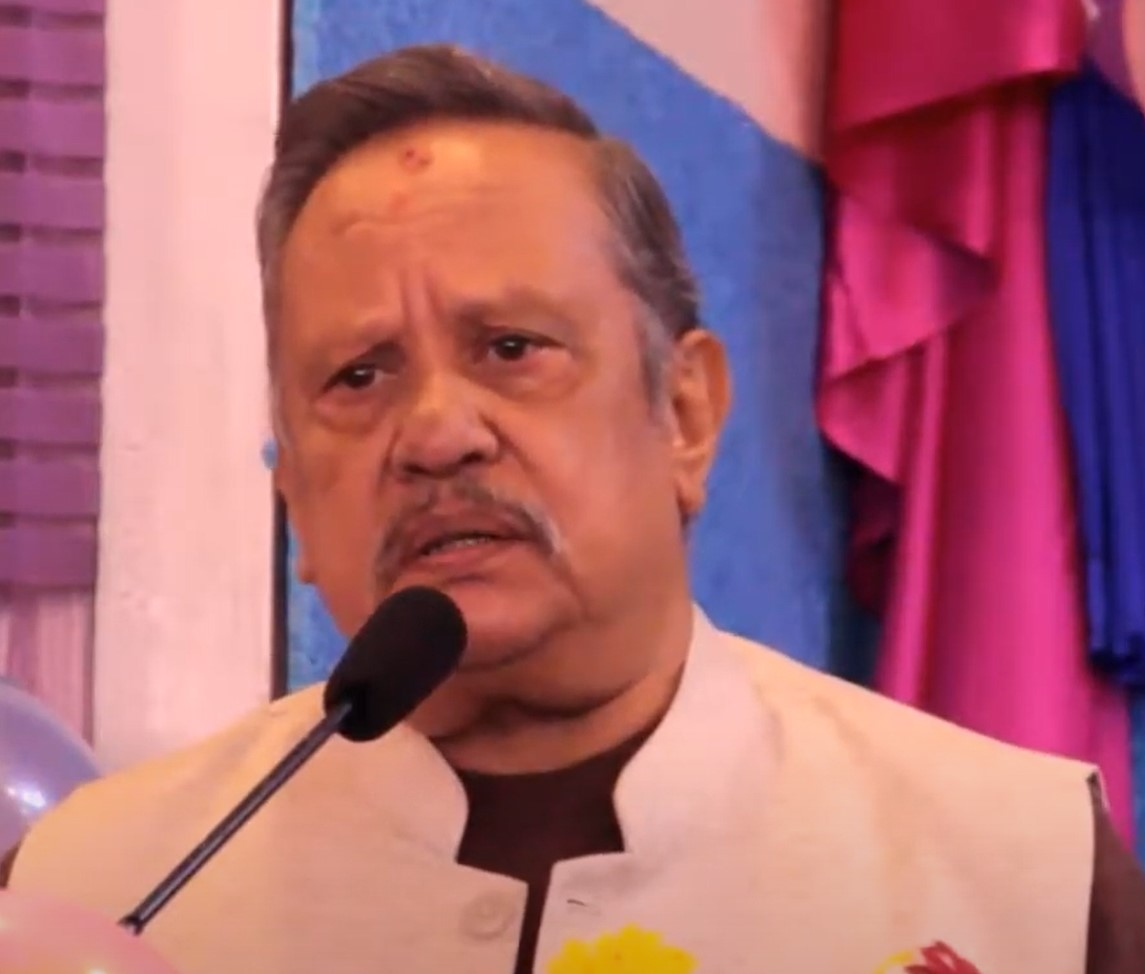
- Born: 11 October 1953 (age 72); Kathmandu, Nepal
- Occupations: Actor; director; producer; poet; songwriter; businessman
- Years active: 1981–present
- Political party: Nepali Congress

Neer Bikram Shah, also known as Nir Shah, is a Nepalese film actor, director, producer, poet, songwriter, and businessman. He is considered one of the leading actors in Nepali cinema history and an actor with multiple identities. He is related to the royal family of Nepal.

== Film career ==
Neer Shah is the producer or co-producer of many Nepali movies. He has also directed several Nepali movies produced by himself, including Basudev, Pachchis Basanta, Basanti, and a Nepal Bhasa movie Rajamati. He is also a co-producer of the Oscar-nominated film Himalaya – l'enfance d'un chef, which was co-produced and directed by the French movie maker Eric Valli. The film, also released as Caravan (in Canada) and Himalaya (in Denmark and France), was the first film from Nepal to win an Oscar nomination.

Shah has also played antagonistic as well as other character roles in movies such as Prem Pinda and Balidan. He has also appeared in a few Bollywood movies as a guest artist. Shah has also penned down many Nepali and Nepal Bhasa songs. He has also done the scriptwriting for a few of his films.

In 2001, he served on the jury of Film South Asia '01, the festival of South Asian documentaries, along with Firdous Azim and Shyam Benegal.

== Filmography ==
=== As an actor ===
Year	Title	Role	Notes
1980	Sindoor	Usa's First Husband	
1985	Kusume Rumal		
1995	Prem Pinda		
1995	Nata Ragat Ko		
1997	Balidaan		
2000	Dhuk Dhuki		
2000	Yo Maya Ko Sagar	Abhayjan	
2001	Badal Paree	Arjun	
2001	Siudo Ko Sindoor		
2001	Jeevan Sathi		
2001	Gaunthali		
2001	Badal Paree		
2002	Bakshis		
2002	Baacha Bandhan		
2003	Muna Madan		
2008	Sano Sansar	Police Officer	
2008	Kismat		
2010	The Flash Back: Farkera Herda	Sirish's uncle	
2014	Chha Yekan Chha	Shreeman Judge	
2015	Woda Number 6	Kaji	
2018	Chhakka Panja 3	Kaji	
2023	Chhakka Panja 4		
2025	Paran		

== Service ==
Shah was the first head and founder of Nepal Television (NTV), the first TV station in Nepal, and is the chairman of Shangri-La TV (STV), a film production and microwave TV distribution company. STV produced many programmes for NTV and also provided the cable television network in Kathmandu valley. Shah holds 33 per cent equity in a United Kingdom-based firm, Galaxy, which is involved in telecasting Nepalese TV channels overseas. Along with Nirmal Nicholas Paul, he set up a production company called "888 Films", that produces Nepalese and Hindi films. Another of his companies, National Studio, provides training in various fields of cinema production. He is also one of the proprietors of New Century Pictures Pvt.Ltd., a film production company. Shah also serves on the Governing Council of College of Journalism and Mass Communication in Nepal.

In 2002, he was felicitated by the Minister for Culture, Tourism and Civil Aviation in recognition of his contribution in the "promotion of Nepalese art and culture and tourism industry".

He currently lives in London.

== Royal affiliation ==
One of his two brothers, Kumar Khadga Bikram Shah, was married to one of three former King Gyanendra Shah's sisters, Princess Sharada Shah. Both his brother and sister-in-law were killed in the infamous Royal Massacre of 2001. His other brother is Lalit Bikram Shah.

== Politics ==
Shah is also affiliated with the Nepali Congress. Earlier, close to CPN (Maoist Centre), he became close to the Nepali Congress after he was appointed as director of Nepal Television during the period of Minendra Rijal as communication minister.

== Awards ==
- Chinnalata Geet Puraskar (2011).
