= Tulsi Ghimire =

Indian filmmaker (born 1951)

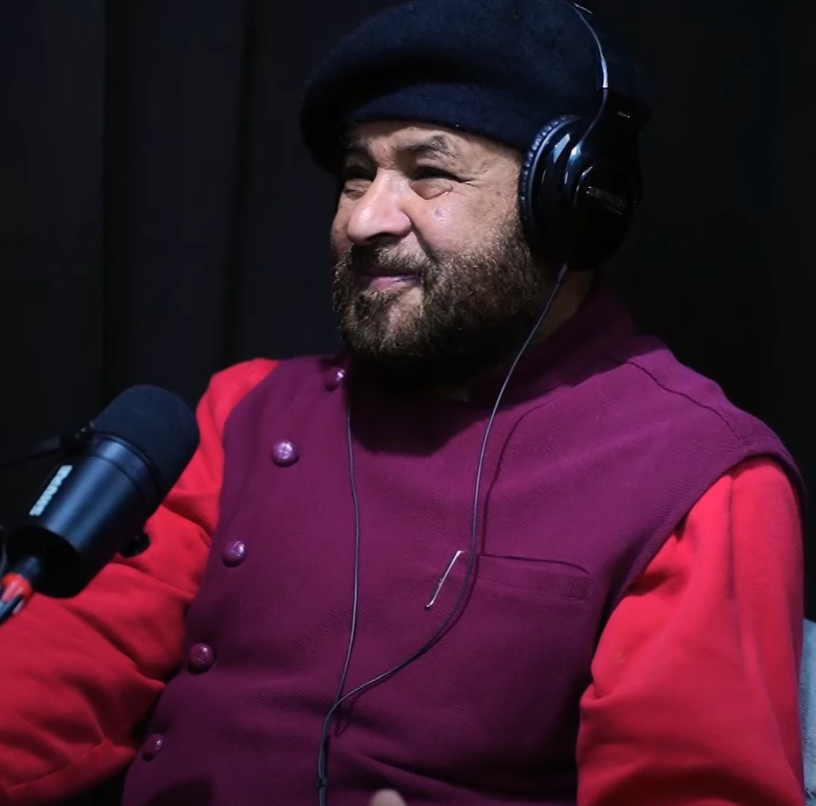
- Ghimire in KTV Podcast (2023)
- Born: 15 July 1951 (age 75); Sindeybong, West Bengal, India
- Occupations: Film director; screenwriter; actor; film editor
- Spouse: Bharati Ghimire
- Children: 2
- Relatives: Shrawan Ghimire (brother)

Tulsi Ghimire (born 15 July 1951) is an Indian film director, screenwriter, film editor, cameraman, actor and lyricist known for his works in Nepali films. Regarded as one of the greatest filmmakers of Nepali cinema, he is known for his romantic and masala films that deal with social issues of Nepali society and portrayal of deep human emotions. He has directed some iconic Nepali films like Kusume Rumal (1985), Lahure (1989), Deuta (1991), Chino, (1991) Dakshina (1994), Balidaan (1997) and Darpan Chaya (2001). The Majority of his films in the 1990s were blockbusters and Kusume Rumal and Darpan Chaya went on to become the highest grossing Nepalese films of all time.

== Personal life ==
Tulsi Ghimire was born on 15 July 1951 in Sindeybong, Kalimpong district (then Darjeeling district), West Bengal, India to Indian Gorkha parents Dhojman Ghimire and Narbada Ghimire. He has two younger brothers and a sister.

Ghimire studied at the Mani Memorial Primary School in Sindeybong up to second grade, and then from grade 3 to 11 at the Scottish University Mission Institute (SUMI), Kalimpong. He obtained a Bachelor of Arts degree from Kalimpong College.

He is married to Bharati Ghimire (Gazmer), who has sung in many of his films. His brother Shrawan Ghimire is a film producer. Tulsi's children, Bhawana Ghimire and Panchami Ghimire, appeared in his children's film, Swarg Ko Pari.

== Films ==
In addition to being a film director, Tulsi Ghimire has also been a screenwriter, editor, cameraman, actor and lyricist.

Ghimire initially moved to Mumbai from Kalimpong in 1974 to work in the Indian film industry, Bollywood. He lived in poverty for a while and his mentor and Bollywood editor Kamlakar Karkhanis advised him to make Nepali movies at that time. Ghimire debuted in the Nepali film industry with the Nepali movie Bansuri in 1981 as a director. He made his second movie Kusume Rumal in 1985, based on his own story, which became very successful.

Among his movies, Kusume Rumal, Lahure, Deuta, Chino, Balidaan, Dakshina and Darpan Chhaya are considered superhits. Darpan Chaya is considered to be one of the biggest blockbusters of Nepali cinema.

Although he found lot of success in 1980s, 1990s, and early 2000s, he was unable to comeback with another hit. He was unable to find success with films he directed later on in his life, those films include Drishtikon, Mrigatrishna, and Darpan Chhaya 2 which were all considered flop in box office.

== Filmography ==
Year	Film	Title translation	Starring cast	Ghimire's role
1981	Basuri	Flute	Rakesh Pandey, Banni Pradhan, Rajani Sharma	Director
1983	Jagwal	Long Wait	Parashar Gaud, Ramesh Mandoliya, Vinod Balodi, Kusum Bisht ,Rajshree, Dinesh Kothiyal, MC Sharma, Sharda Negi, Kishore Rawat- Local Artist-Guest Appearance	Director- [First Garhwali Film]
1985	Kusume Rumal	Silk handkerchief	Bhuwan K.C., Tripti Nadakar, Udit Narayan, Neer Shah	Director, editor, story writer
1988	Anyaaya	Injustice	Meera Madhuri, Biswa Basnet, Prakash Adhikari	Director
1989	Lahure	Soldier	Shrawan Ghimire, Tripti Nadakar	Director, actor, editor, story
1989	Chino	Emblem	Shiva Shrestha, Bhuwan K.C., Sunil Thapa, Kristi Mainali, Sharmila Malla, Sinaura Mistry, Subhadra Adhikari, Aaron Malla, Sushila Raymajhi	Director
1991	Deuta	God	Rajesh Hamal, Srijana Basnet, Shrawan Ghimire	Director, editor, story writer, screenwriter, lyricist
1992	Dui Thopa Aansoo	Two drops of tears	Bhuwan K.C., Shrawan Ghimire, Anuradha Sawant	Director
1993	Koseli	Gift	Tripti Nadakar, Krishna Malla, Bharati Ghimire, Shrawan Ghimire, Vijaya Lama	Director
1994	Dakshina	Honorarium	Tulsi Ghimire, Bhuwan K.C., Bharati Ghimire	Director, actor
1996	Rahar	Wish	Tulsi Ghimire, Bharati Ghimire, Prashant, Niruta Singh	Director
1997	Balidaan	Sacrifice	Hari Bansha Acharya, Madan Krishna Shrestha, Anjana Shrestha, Neer Shah	Director, cameraman, editor
2001	Darpan Chaya	Reflection	Dilip Rayamajhi, Niruta Singh, Uttam Pradhan	Director, editor, story writer
2002	Lahana	Auspicious Moment	Dilip Rayamajhi, Niruta Singh, Uttam Pradhan	Director, editor, story writer
2007	Dui Kinara	Two banks of river	Niruta Singh, Suman Singh, Bhupen Chand	Director
2009	Maya Ta Maya Ho	Love is love	Nikhil Upreti, Sanchita Luitel, Suraj R.D., Tulsi Ghimire	Director, actor
2010	Desh	Nation	Rajesh Hamal, Nikhil Upreti, Niruta Singh	Director, lyricist
2010	Swarg Ki Pari	Angel from heaven	Neer Shah, Bharati Ghimire, Prithviraj Ghimire, Prakriti Bhattarai (child artist)	Director
2011	Mrigatrishna	Mirage	Karma Shakya, Biraj Bhatta, Nandita KC	Director, editor, lyricist
2012	Drishtikon	Point of view	Bharati Ghimire, Bhaskar Pradhan, Lalit Goley	Director
Unreleased as of 2016	Gautama Buddha		(animated film)	Director
2017	Darpan Chhaya 2	Reflection	Pushplal Khadka, Sahara Karki, Shraddha Prasai	Director
2026	Pahaad	Mountain	Bipin Karki, Sunil Thapa, Madan Krishna Shrestha, Arun Chhetri, Panchami Ghimirey	Director

== Awards ==
Year	Award	Category	Work	Result	Ref(s)
2020	National Film Award	Lifetime Achievement Award	–	Won	

== See also ==
- Cinema of Nepal
