= Darpan Chhaya =

2001 Nepali film by Tulsi Ghimire

Darpan Chaya
- Promotional Poster
- Directed by: Tulsi Ghimire
- Written by: Tulsi Ghimire
- Produced by: Shrawan Ghimire
- Starring: Niruta Singh; Dilip Rayamajhi; Ongdeep Lepcha; Ayush Rai; Tulsi Ghimire
- Music by: Ranjit Gazmer
- Release date: 1 September 2001 (Nepal)
- Country: Nepal
- Language: Nepali
- Box office: रु 1.75 crore

Darpan Chhaya (Nepali: दर्पण छायाँ, romanized: The Illusory Mirror) is a 2001 Nepalese romantic drama film, written and directed by Tulsi Ghimire. The film is produced by Shrawan Ghimire under the banner of Siddhanta Films. The film features an ensemble cast including Dilip Rayamajhi, Uttam Pradhan, and Niruta Singh in the lead roles, alongside Laxmi Giri, Tika Pahari, and Jeetu Nepal. The film's plot concerns a love triangle between two best friends where one of them is blind, fall in love with the same girl and the whole film follows their journey of friendship, love and sacrifice.

The film received extremely positive reviews and response from critics and audience especially for its music, screenplay and performances of the three main leads, The film was a historic success, broke all previous records at the box office and went on to become the highest-grossing Nepali film of all time, breaking the 16-year-old record of Kusume Rumal until its record was broken by Hami Tin Bhai in 2004. The film is considered a cult classic and one of the greatest movies ever made in Nepali Cinema. The film songs, especially the song "Lahana Le Jurayo Ki", are still a top choice of Nepalese functions and celebrations.

== Plot ==
The film revolves around best friends and college students, Abhi and Raj. Abhi is blind and Raj takes care of him. Abhi strikes up a friendship with newcomer Smriti but Raj and Smriti get off to a poor start. At a college picnic, the girls play a prank on the boys and hide their clothes. Things go wrong when the boys develop allergies after using leaves to cover themselves. The college principal scolds Smriti for harming their star basketball player, Raj. Smriti apologizes to him and soon Raj and Smriti also become friends.

Gradually, both Abhi and Raj start falling for Smriti. Abhi proposes to Smriti who leaves his house in shock and tells him that she loves Raj. When Raj proposes to her soon after, she tells him that she actually loves Abhi. At a dinner where the three friends are together, Abhi discloses that he lost his vision in an accident that Raj was responsible for, leading to a rift between the friends. Meanwhile, Abhi's mother discovers what Smriti told both of them and helps Raj and Abhi patch things up. When they reach college to confront Smriti, they come to know that she is in the hospital fighting for her life. They rush to the hospital where her father hands them a letter in which Smriti tells them that she got the news that she has last stage cancer the day before Abhi proposed to her and she did not want to break his heart. She requests for her eyes to be donated to Abhi and for Raj to always be strong and take care of his friend. Smriti passes away. As Raj pleads with her to open her eyes, the scene cuts to Abhi and Raj who are doing a book reading of their story called Darpan Chaya.

== Cast ==
- Dilip Rayamajhi as Raj
- Niruta Singh as Smriti
- Uttam Pradhan as Abhishek
- Tulsi Ghimire as Smriti's father
- Laxmi Giri as Abhishek's mother
- Tika Pahari as Raj's father
- Jitu Nepal as College friend

== Soundtrack ==
All music was composed by Ranjit Gazmer.

All lyrics are written by Tulsi Ghimire.

No.	Title	Singer(s)	Length
1.	"Lahana Le Jurayo Ki"	Sadhana Sargam	5:55
2.	"Lahana Le Jurayo Ki (remixed)"	Indrajeet Mijar	4:31
3.	"Tyo Danda Paari"	Udit Narayan, Deepa Jha	5:23
4.	"Ukali Ko Dandai Danda"	Rubi Joshi, Meera Rana	2:29
5.	"Baishalu Mana Le Rojeko"	Udit Narayan, Sadhana Sargam	3:43
6.	"Naya Geet Gau Bhane"	Saman Sharma	2:15
Total length:			24:16

== About the movie ==
Darpan Chaya grossed roughly NRS 1.75 crore+ at the box office, surpassing Tulsi Ghimire's own 1987 classic Kusume Rumal to become the highest grossing Nepali movie of all time. If adjusted for inflation its collection crosses रु 30cr mark making it the biggest grosser ever in Nepal (among all National And International film releases in the country).

The soundtrack of the film, with music composed by Ranjit Gazmer, became hugely popular. The song "Lahanale jurayo ki" by Sadhana Sargam was very popular, as well as the dance of Niruta Singh.

== Sequel ==
After 15 years of Darpan Chaya, Tulsi Ghimire announced a sequel Darpan Chhaya 2 which was released in 2017. New actors like Pushpal Khadka and Sahara Karki were cast. The film was directed and written by Tulsi Ghimire and released on March 10, 2017. The film received largely negative reviews and was Box Office Disaster.

== See also ==
- List of Nepalese films
