= Dilip Rayamajhi =

Nepalese actor, producer and choreographer

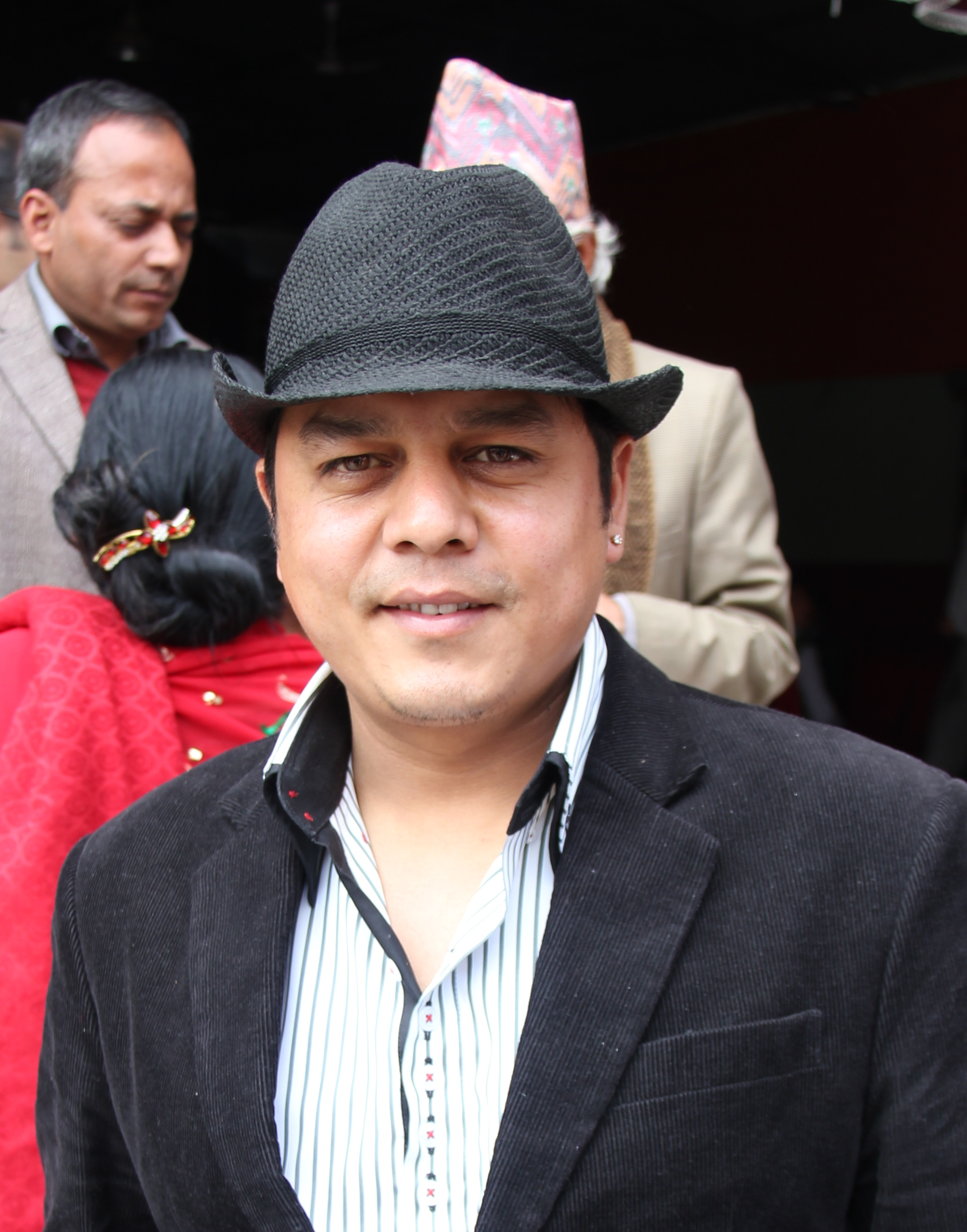
- Dilip Rayamajhi in 2014
- Born: May 6, 1975 (age 51); Kathmandu, Nepal
- Occupations: Actor, choreographer
- Years active: 1996–present
- Spouse: Manju Rayamajhi
- Children: Divya Rayamajhi

Dilip Rayamajhi (Nepali: दिलीप रायमाझी; born 6 May 1975) is a Nepalese film actor, producer and choreographer.

He started his career as a dancer and got his first movie break in a video film as a side dancer(sandip shahi)and then he was offered the "big break" in the movie "Bhanubhakta".

Rayamajhi is currently working with the Bhutannese-Nepali organization Intra National Welfare Foundation of America under Dilli Adhikari's supervision. He also judges the dancing reality show Mero Dance Universe, which started in 2023 and is Nepal's first international reality show.

== Filmography ==
Year	Film	Role	Ref(s)
1999	Aadi Kabi Bhanubhakta		
2000	Jindagani		
2001	Aafno Manche		
2001	Aafno Ghar Aafno Manchhe		
2001	K Bho Launa Ni		
2001	Superstar		
2001	Darpan Chhaya	Raj	
2001	Badal Pari		
2002	Mitini		
2002	Mamaghar		
2002	Lahana		
2002	Dhansampati		
2002	Malai Maaf Garideu		
2002	Muskan		
2003	Pahuna		
2003	Dukha		
2004	Undone By Love		
2005	Muglan		
2006	Maanish	Gopal	
2012	Miss You		
2016	Bato Muni Ko Phool 2		
2017	Gore		
2018	Destination Kathmandu		
2018	Kahi Katai		
2018	Nai Nabhannu La 5		
