= Kusume Rumal =

1985 Nepalese film written and directed by Tulsi Ghimire

- DVD Cover
- Nepali: कुसुमे रुमाल
- Directed by: Tulsi Ghimire
- Written by: Tulsi Ghimire
- Produced by: Sumitra Paudel (Sayapatri Films)
- Starring: Udit Narayan; Neer Shah; Tripti Nadakar; Bhuwan K.C.
- Cinematography: Binod Pradhan
- Edited by: Tulsi Ghimire
- Music by: Ranjit Gazmer
- Release date: 1985
- Running time: 125 m
- Country: Nepal
- Language: Nepali

Kusume Rumal (Nepali: कुसुमे रुमाल; transl. Silk Handkerchief) is a 1985 Nepali romantic film written and directed by Tulsi Ghimire. It was produced by Sumitra Paudel under the banner of Sayapatri Films. The film featured Bhuwan K.C, Tripti Nadakar, Udit Narayan and Neer Shah in lead roles. This was the first film in which singer Udit Narayan acted. It is one of the most loved films in Nepal and was the first Nepali film to celebrate silver jubilee.

The film received critical acclaim for its story, portrayal of class discrimination, performance of the cast, especially Bhuwan K.C., and the chartbuster music. The movie was a big commercial success and went on to become the highest grossing Nepali film of all time, a record it held for 16 years until it was broken by another Tulsi Ghimire film, Darpan Chaya. The film's songs, composed by Ranjit Gazmer, were all huge hits and are remembered till today. The film's music album is considered one of the best music albums ever made. In 2009, the son of the producer of this film directed Kusume Rumal 2, which was the story of the second generation of the original cast. Both Tripti Nadakar and Neer Shah acted in minor roles as an ode to the original film.

== Storyline ==
The film is a triangular love story about Amar (Udit Narayan) and Suniti (Tripti Nadakar) who are collegemates and lovers. When she returns to her hometown, she spends some time with Arjun (Bhuwan K.C.) who works at her house; without her knowledge; he falls for her. The rest of the story is about the conclusion of this love story when another classmate of Suniti's college forcibly tries to marry her.

== Cast ==
- Udit Narayan as Amar
- Tripti Nadakar as Suniti
- Bhuwan K.C. as Arjun
- Neer Shah
- Biswa Hingmang as Jetay

== Box office ==
Kusume Rumal was a huge box office success becoming the highest-grossing movie of the time until another Tulsi Ghimire film Darpan Chaya broke its record in 2001. The movie was the first Nepali movie to spend 25 weeks in the box office top ten list and the first actual blockbuster.

== Soundtrack ==
All music is composed by Ranjit Gazmer.

No.	Title	Singer(s)	Length
1.	"Kusume Rumal"	Udit Narayan, Deepa Jha	6:28
2.	"Kaiche Ma Sari"	Bharati Ghimire, Shrawan Ghimire	2:58
3.	"Timi Nabhaye"	Udit Narayan	5:12
4.	"Suna Bhana Na"	Udit Narayan, Deepa Jha	4:55
5.	"Bhuligaye Samjhana Lai"	Bharati Ghimire	2:53
6.	"Reli Khola Bagara"	Bharati Ghimire	4:26
