= Ranjit Gazmer =

Indian musician

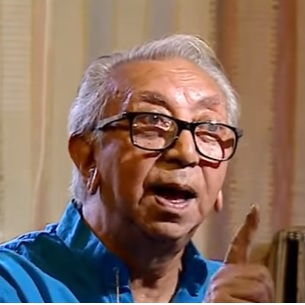

Background information
- Also known as: Kancha
- Born: Ranjit Gazmer; 3 October 1941 (age 84); Darjeeling, West Bengal, India
- Genres: Filmi
- Occupations: Music director, musician
- Instruments: Madal, Vibraphone, Tabla, Drums, Harmonium, Keyboard
- Years active: 1970-present
- Label: His Master's Voice

Ranjit Gazmer, also credited as Ranjit Gajmer, is an Indian musician and music director known for his contribution to the music industry of Nepali cinema. He had a long association with Indian music director R.D. Burman. He has composed for most of the films directed by Tulsi Ghimire, a film director in Nepal.

== Early life ==
Ranjit Gazmer is from a gold merchant Gorkha family of Darjeeling, West Bengal.

Gazmer was a student of Amber Gurung at his Art Academy of Music in Darjeeling. His contemporaries were Gopal Yonzon, Karma Yonzon, Sharan Pradhan, Aruna Lama and Jitendra Bardewa, all of whom went on to be musicians. He was a part of a musical group called 'Sangam Club' and was also a drummer for 'The Hillians', the first-ever western band formed in Darjeeling. In 1966, he moved to Birgunj, Nepal with his friends, which included Anuradha Koirala (then Anuradha Gurung), managing an English-medium private school. In 1967, Gazmer moved to Kathmandu with his friends and became a studio musician at Radio Nepal. Later, he moved to Mumbai (then Bombay) to pursue his music career there with R.D. Burman.

== Career ==
=== Initial works ===
Gazmer joined George Banks, father of Louis Banks and was performing in his Band. When the Royal Nepal Academy was opened by King Mahendra, Ramsaran Darnal, who worked in the academy called up Gazmer and gave him a job.

Manohari Singh, a close aid of the Burmans, invited Gazmer to join him in Mumbai. Gazmer arrived in Mumbai on 25 December 1971. Singh then introduced him to R.D. Burman. After initial introduction where he played a tune composed by himself, he was asked to be present in a recording at Film Centre, Tardeo. When Gazmer reached there, he was surprised and happy to see that the tune which he had played in front of Burman when being introduced was being recorded. The song was 'Kanchi Re Kanchi Re', which had been inspired from Gazmer's composition 'Kancha Re Kancha'. After the recording, Burman told him, "This is your song. And from today, you shall be called 'Kancha'". Since then, he was a sitting member of Burman's team as a percussionist until Burman's death in 1994.

== Music ==
Gazmer worked under R.D. Burman in Mumbai, playing madal in several Hindi film songs. In 1982, Ranjit arranged for Asha Bhosle to sing her first Nepali film song with him. Asha Bhosle's first Nepali song was however in the film Maitighar. Ranjit he has composed music for several Nepali films such as Samjhana, Kusume Rumal, Lahure, Saino, and Darpan Chaya. He is based in Mumbai and records songs in the studios there.

== Biography ==
Shekhar Kharel wrote and published "Mohani Madalko" biography book, which details the life and career of Ranjit Gazmer in 2022.

== Discography ==
=== As a music director ===
Year	Film	Notes
1981	Bansuri	
1983	Samjhana	
1985	Kusume Rumal	
1985	Basudev	
1987	Saino	
1989	Lahure	
1989	Behuli	
1989	Pheri Bhetaula	
1991	Chino	
1991	Trishna	
1992	Dui Thopa Aanshu	
1993	Koseli	
1994	Dakshina	
1996	Deuta	
2001	Darpan Chaya	
2002	Lahana	
2007	Dui Kinara	
