= Bhuwan K.C. =

Nepali actor

- भुवन केसी
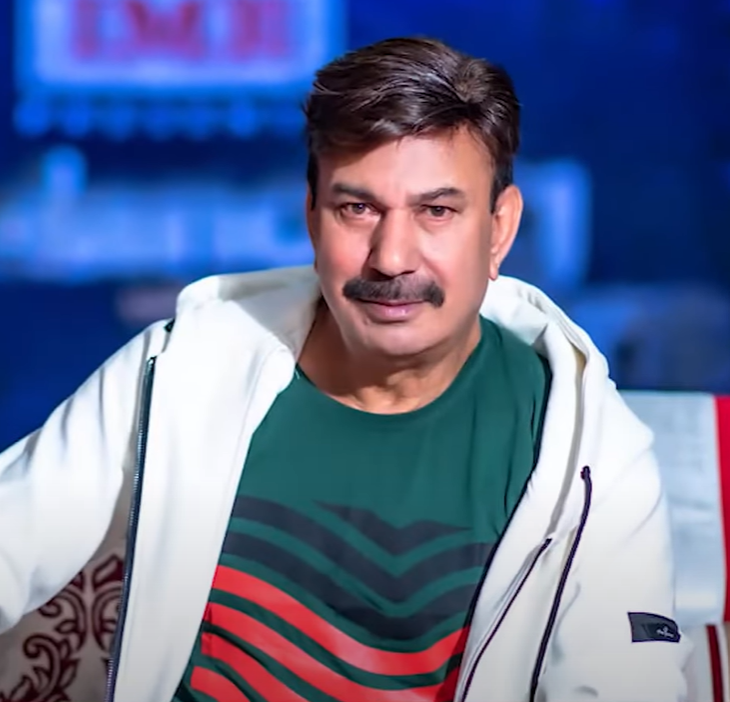
- Bhuwan KC in 2022
- Born: 17 September 1954 (age 72); Kathmandu, Nepal
- Occupations: Actor, film director, film producer, politician
- Years active: 1966–present
- Notable work: Kusume Rumal, Samjhana, Karodpati, Dakshina, Chino
- Height: 5 ft 7 in (170 cm)
- Political party: Nepali Congress
- Spouse(s): Vijaya Malla KC (separated); Sushmita Bomjan (separated)
- Partner: Jiya K.C. (2017–present)
- Children: Anmol K.C. Vivek K.C. Sugam Pandey K.C.

Bhuwan K.C. (Nepali: भुवन केसी; born 17 September 1954) is a Nepalese actor, director, producer, singer, and politician known for his work in Nepali cinema. He was the chairman of the Film Development Board; he was appointed to this position in 2022.

== Film career ==
Bhuwan K.C. began his career at the age of 10 as a singer for Radio Nepal [2], performing songs such as "Jage Jage Sara Raat," "Aru Kalo Rail Ko Dhuwale," and "Mayalu Timi Tadha." debut movie was Juni (1983) but it was the 1984 release Samjhana that helped establish him as a successful actor. Since then, K.C. has gone on to act in numerous successful films like Kusume Rumal (1985), Santaan (1987), Tilhari (1988), Kanyadan (1990), Chino (1990), Trishna (1991), Dui Thopa Aansu (1993), Dakshina (1994), Raanko (1995), Karodpati (1997), Nepali Babu (1999), and Superstar (2003). He directed Dreams (2016), starring his son Anmol K.C. in the lead role.

== Political life ==
Bhuwan KC is a member of the Nepali Congress, which he joined after leaving CPN (UML). Earlier in 2022, he planned to run for the mayor position in the 2022 Kathmandu municipal election, at the time he was associated with the Advanced Democratic Party; however, due to some unknown reason, he stepped back and decided not to run for the position; he left the party and joined Nepali Congress.

== Controversies ==
In June 2020, actress Samragyee RL Shah uploaded a video to Instagram detailing harassment of a sexual and emotional nature from a senior film industry veteran. Numerous news outlets later identified the man as Bhuwan K.C. K.C. then filed a defamation case against Shah, even though she had not mentioned him by name. Film director Naresh Poudel filed a writ petition against him on 11 August 2022, before the Supreme Court of Nepal.

== Filmography ==
- Juni (1983)
- Miss Bangkok (1985)
- Kusume Rumal (1985)
- Samjhana (1986)
- Santaan (1987)
- Saino (1988)
- Mayalu (1988)
- Pachhis Basanta (1989)
- Tilhari (1989)
- Kanyadan (1990)
- Bijay Parajay (1990)
- Chino (1991)
- Maya (1991)
- Lobhi Papi (1991)
- Pariwar (1991)
- Sapana (1992)
- Trishna (1992)
- Dui Thopa Aansu (1993)
- Sankalpa (1993)
- Arpan (1993)
- Sauta (1994)
- Badal (1994)
- Tuhuro (1994)
- Dakshina (1994)
- Mahadevi (1994)
- Radha Krishna (1994)
- Dharma (1995)
- Aaghat (1996)
- Daijo (1996)
- Raanko (1996)
- Karodpati (1997)
- Pachyauri (1997)
- Nepali Babu (1999)
- Ta Ta Sarai Bigris Ni Badri (2000)
- Superstar (2001)
- Badal Pari (2001)
- Babu Saheb (2002)
- Raju Raja Ram (2005)
- Manish (2006)
- Duniya (2006)
- Chor Sipahi (2007)
- Ma Timi Bina Marihalchhu (2008)
- Ma Ta Timrai Hu (2008)
- Sathi Ma Timro (2012)
- Birasat (2012)
- Dreams (2016) - director and producer
- Kri (2018) - producer
- Mr Nepali (2019)

== Singing career ==
=== Albums ===
- Aina
- Kantipur
- Muskan
- Nausay Khola
- Pokhara
- Sabailai
- Sadhana
- Smarika

== Nominations of Awards ==
List of Awards and Nominations
| | Ceremony | Category | Nominated work | Result |
|---|---|---|---|---|
| 2016 | National Film Awards | Best Director | Dreams | Won |
