= Cinema of Nepal =

Cinema of Nepal (Nepali: नेपाली चलचित्र)
- Cinema of Nepal
- No. of screens: 450
  - Per capita: 0.2 per 100,000 (2001)
- Main distributors: Baasuri Films; Kafiya Films; Kathmandu Films; Picture Frame; Rich Entertainment; Shree Byankatesh Entertainment; Seven Seas Cinema; The Tea Folks Films

Produced feature films (2016)
- Total: 100

Nepali Cinema, also referred to as "Nepali Chalachitra" (Nepali: नेपाली चलचित्र) is the filmmaking industry in Nepal. This includes films in various languages of Nepal, most notably in the Nepali language but also in Newari, Maithili, Tamang, Bhojpuri and Tharu among others. The term Cinemandu is also used, as a portmanteau for films produced in the Nepali language while the Nepalese films produced from Kathmandu and Janakpur in the Maithili language is known as Mithilawood. Both of these film industries are the largest viewing cinema of Nepal and are collectively known as Nepali Cinema.

== History ==
The making of Nepalese films is said to have begun with D.B. Pariyar's Satya Harishchandra, which was the first Nepali-language movie to be shot. It was produced in Kolkata, India, and released on 14 September 1951. Aama (mother) was the first film produced in Nepal and was released on 7 October 1964. It was produced by the Information Department of His Majesty's Government of Nepal (now Government of Nepal (GoN)).

The first film to be produced under a private banner was Maitighar, which was released at the end of 1966.

The Nepal government established the Royal Nepal Film Corporation in 1971. Mann Ko Bandh was the first film produced by the corporation.

Paral Ko Aago was produced by Cinema in 1978. The music director Shanti Thatal became the first female music director in Nepali movies.

=== Golden era ===
With the start of the 1980s, more films were being made and they were more accepted by Nepalese audiences. Badlindo Aakash, Samjhana, Kusume Rumal, Lahure, Kanchhi, Basudev, Saino and Koseli were released between 1984 and 1993. The leading actors were Bhuwan K.C. and Tripti Nadakar, whose on-screen chemistry saw them being dubbed the "golden couple" of the industry. In the later years of the decade, the industry saw the rise of Rajesh Hamal and Karishma Manandhar.

In 1990, the film industry began to grow rapidly. There was an unprecedented growth in the number of productions. Within three years, some 140 films were made. Cinemas increased to more than 300.

=== Conflict era ===
Because of the Maoist insurgency in Nepal in the mid-1990s a very small number of films were made, and audience numbers fell sharply. In the later years after the conflict, the production and release of Nepali films had almost come to a standstill. Many actors and filmmakers left the country in search for work abroad. Actors like Saroj Khanal, Shiva Shrestha, Karishma Manandhar, Tripti Nadakar, Kristi Mainali and Gauri Malla had little work.

In 2000–2001, the then-highest-grossing Nepali film Darpan Chaya and 'Jindagani' were made.

=== 2006–present ===
By 2006, as the situation in Nepal calmed down and with Maoists coming into mainstream politics, the Nepali film industry started to return to its previous state, and more films were being made and released. This period also marked the commencement of digital films in the industry.

In December 2016, Bijuli Machine, Nepal's first science-fiction film with a social story was released and ran successfully in cinemas. The movie was directed and written by Navin Awal with Santosh Lamichhane as a scientific consultant. It was reported that the movie set a trend in Nepali films by a making a movie with a low budget, without an item song, stereotypical fights or a romantic story, rather with an authentic Nepali story inspired by the problems faced in the society, like electricity power cuts, and still succeeded to entertain the audience.

The Legend of Shankhadhar is reported to be the first animated Nepali film.

== Film Development Board ==
The Film Development Board is a liaison to facilitate the conceptualization, making, distribution and exhibition of Nepali films.

== See also ==
- List of Nepalese films
- List of highest-grossing Nepali films
- List of most expensive Nepali films
- National Film Awards (Nepal)

More general article

- Cinema of the world
- List of Nepal Bhasa films
