= Jiwanta Sambandha =

2023 memoir by Om Murti Anil

- Author: Om Murti Anil
- Language: Nepali
- Subject: Relationship
- Genre: Memoir
- Published: 2023
- Publisher: Dr. Om Foundation
- Publication date: September 22, 2023
- Publication place: Nepal
- Media type: Print (Paperback and Hardcover)
- Pages: 240
- ISBN: 978-9-937-14551-0
- Website: https://dromfoundation.com/article/16

Jiwanta Sambandha (Nepali: जीवन्त सम्बन्ध) is a memoir by the Nepalese cardiologist Om Murti Anil, describing the importance of relationships. It is inspired by his experience after the death of his father.

The book received reviews in national media for its storytelling. The entire revenue from the sales of this book is used to support vulnerable elderly people, conduct health camps, and provide scholarships to underprivileged students through the Dr. Om Foundation.

== Background ==
Jiwanta Sambandha is the second book by Dr. Om Murti Anil, who authored his first book, "Ma Pani Doctor" in 2013, to promote health awareness in the Nepali language. It draws on Anil's relationship with his father, Tej Narayan Singh, a social worker from Mahottari district, who died from prostate cancer.

The book draws on themes of life, family, and death. The cover was revealed at a pre-launch event in September 2023.

== Plot and themes ==
Jiwanta Sambandha consists of 53 chapters and 240 pages, and is published in both hardcover and paperback editions in the Nepali language. The book presents the author's reflections after the loss of his father. It includes personal memories with observations on family relationships of contemporary Nepali society.

It explores the emotional bond between parents and children, highlighting caregiving to parents not as a burden but as a responsibility that is rooted in emotional connection and personal growth. The author, himself a doctor, draws from his professional experience and offers practical insights, sharing moments of ethical dilemmas, grief, and compassion, and advocates a holistic approach to healing that extends beyond clinical practice and treatment.

The book also addresses societal changes. It includes spiritual and cultural references from Hindu scriptures like the Bhagavad Gita and Ramayana.

== Publication and launch ==
Jiwanta Sambandha was published by the Dr. Om Foundation. It was launched on 22 September 2023, Kathmandu and the event was attended by individuals from literary, medical, and cultural sectors. The book was launched by Rajkumari Devi Singh, the author's mother. Dr. Anil chose his mother to inaugurate the book to honor the central theme of Jiwanta Sambandha, meaning a parent-child bond.

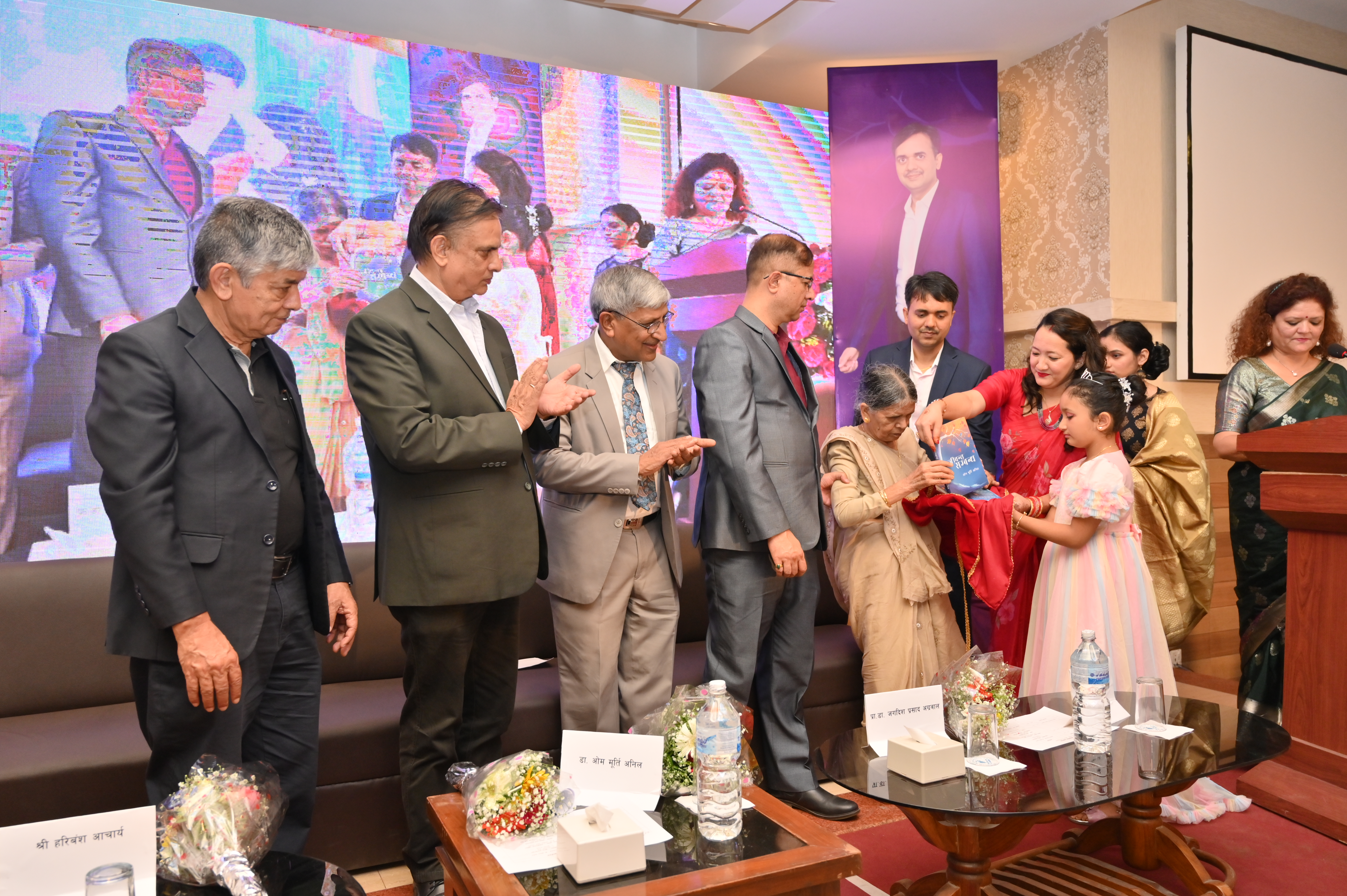
Book launch ceremony of Jiwanta Sambandha in Kathmandu.

Actors Madan Krishna Shrestha and Hari Bansha Acharya (Maha Jodi) attended as chief guests.Professor Jagadish Prasad Agrawal, former Dean of the Institute of Medicine, commented on the spiritual insight of the book. Dr. Bhagawan Koirala, president of the Nepal Medical Council, also conveyed a message of support.

== Reception and popularity ==
Several people have reviewed this book in national media from different perspectives. Bishwambher Pyakurel, an economist, noted in The Rising Nepal that the book explores the relationship between parents and children, particularly the responsibilities of adult children.

Dr. Ravindra Sameer described the book as an exploration of life and culture, and the duties of children toward their parents. Similarly, Sumit Sharma Sameer, an author, discussed the weakening of family bonds in today's Nepalese society and advocated strengthening of relationships between generations.

In Gorkhapatra, Kiran Kumar Shrestha, CEO of Rashtriya Banijya Bank, wrote that the book encourages younger readers to reflect on their duties toward their parents amid changing family dynamics. Naveen Kumar Ghimire, former Chief of CIAA, viewed the book as a mix of science and spirituality and commented on how the author drew from personal experience and philosophical texts to present his views on duty and care.

Other reviewers also linked the book's content to social themes. For example, Sabhyata Jha in Khabarhub, a data scientist, suggested that the book presents an alternative to brain drain by showing how one can pursue a meaningful career without leaving the country. Mina Gyawali, a former member of National Assembly, focused on the book's discussion of parenting and questioned traditional customs such as death rituals.

Subodh Acharya, a medical student, found the book relevant for young doctors, pointing out its emphasis on empathy and service over outward success. Krishna Adhikari of Rastriya Samachar Samiti wrote that the book reflects on duty and emotional connection.

=== Criticism ===
Some reviewers expressed concerns about the book's structure and the consistency of the content. Nirmal Aryal in Kantipur Daily noted that certain chapters like, 'Selfless Advice', were too short and ended abruptly. He also pointed out the absence of a photograph of the author's father and the limited discussion of the mother, which he felt were significant omissions in a book centered on family.

At the book's launch, Hari Bansha Acharya also remarked that not naming or including photos of family members might make the narrative feel less personal for some readers. Mina Gyawali in Online Khabar observed that some ideas were repeated across chapters, which affected the narrative flow.

== Philanthropy and social impact ==
The revenue from the sales of Jiwanta Sambandha fund initiatives of the Dr. Om Foundation, a nonprofit organization established by Dr. Om Murti Anil, to support activities related to health, education, and social transformation. In 2025, the foundation used books sales to provide nationwide scholarships to underprivileged government school students worth 2 million. Similarly, funds from the book have been used to conduct health camps, the "Smokers are not selfish" anti-tobacco campaigns, and the distribution of essential items to underserved communities.

== Legacy and influence ==
Jiwanta Sambandha prompted conversations among readers about the importance of family relationships and individual responsibilities. Some readers reportedly shared the book as a festival gift. Actor Hari Bansha Acharya emphasised the need of inclusion of the book in the school curriculum stating its relevance for younger readers. A few people also have encouraged children and adolescents to read this book to learn personal values and family roles.
