= Arun Chhetri =

Nepalese Actor

- अरुण क्षेत्री
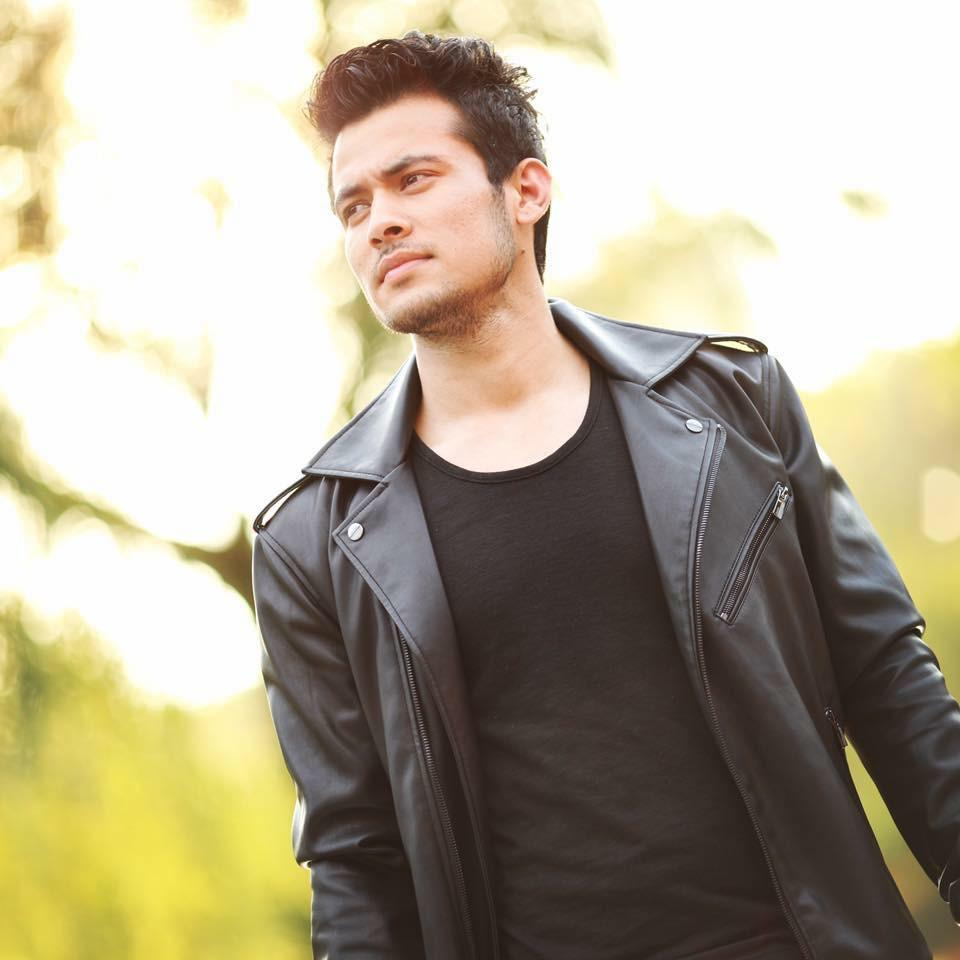
- Born: Arun Belbase; 6 February 1996 (age 30); Ghorahi, Dang, Nepal
- Citizenship: Nepalese
- Occupations: Actor, Dancer
- Years active: 2017–present
- Known for: Gauthali

Arun Belbase known professionally as Arun Chhetri (Nepali: अरुण क्षेत्री; born 06 february 1996) is a Nepalese actor from Ghorahi, Dang. Chhetri started his career in 2017 with the web series Lastai Rag Bho, produced and distributed by Highlight Nepal; however Chhetri gained recognition from his 2022 movie Mahapurush. Mahapurush is a 2022 Nepali drama film written and directed by Pradip Bhattarai. The film stars Maha Jodi (Madan Krishna Shrestha and Hari Bansha Acharya), along with Gauri Malla, Rabindra Singh Baniya, Rajaram Paudel, and Anjana Baraili.

== Early life ==
Chhetri started his acting career professionally in 2017 with the web series Lastai Rag Bho; later the same year Chhetri appeared in the short movie Mayako Sansar. Chhetri auditioned and was selected for the lead role for the movie Mahapurush (released in 2022), which brought him to the limelight. After Mahapurush Chhetri's other movie (Prema) released on 31 March 2023. In August 2026, Chhetri was announced as playing Hari Bansha Acharya in Ma Madan Krishna, a biographical film about Madan Krishna Shrestha directed by Milan Chams. Chams also stated that Chhetri had signed to portray Acharya in a separate planned biographical film about Acharya's life.

== Movies ==
SN	Movie Name	Release Date	Ref
1	Mahapurush	2022 AD	
2	Gauthali	2026 AD	
