= China Harayeko Manchhe =

Autobiography by Hari Bansha Acharya

- Author: Hari Bansha Acharya
- Original title: चिना हराएको मान्छे
- Language: Nepali language
- Genre: Autobiography
- Publisher: FinePrint
- Publication date: April 2013
- Publication place: Nepal
- Pages: 294
- ISBN: 9937866642
- Followed by: Hari Bahadur

China Harayeko Manchhe (Nepali: चिना हराएको मान्छे) is an autobiography written by Hari Bansha Acharya. The story features a god-fearing man who happens to lose his "China" or "Cheena" (horoscope).

== Synopsis ==
The storyline of Cheena Harayako Manchhe, is about a simple, god-fearing man who happens to lose his "China" or "Cheena" (horoscope). The autobiography depicts the author's childhood memories, fantasies and the struggles he had to face during his adolescent years. “The book is the tribute to my late wife Meera and proceeds from the book will go to a trust of her name,” said the author at a press meet.

At the book's launch, Acharya, a Nepali comedian and film actor, said he wished he could be a god in his next life so that he could transform the gods into human beings subject to pain, misery and suffering. He also said he had become an agnostic because his efforts to save his wife had failed despite his devout worship of the gods. He said he wrote the book "to heal my pain of losing her".

Born 9 October 1958, to Homanjaya Acharya and Ganesh Kumari in Gairidharan, Kathmandu, Hari Bansha Acharya has two sons, Trilok and Mohit. Hari Bansha's name is inseparably linked with his comedian partner, Madan Krishna Shrestha, another celebrated comedian/actor of Nepal.

== See also ==
- Khusi
- Antarmanko Yatra
- Jiwan Kada Ki Phool
- Phoolko Aankhama
