= Silu =

Silu may refer to:

- Silu (film)
- Silu (song)
- Zhan Silu, Chinese prelate
- Silu Seppälä, Finnish bassist and actor
- SiLU, the sigmoid linear unit activation function
