= Tej Narayan Singh (social worker) =

Nepali social worker (1937–2022)

- तेज नारायण सिंह
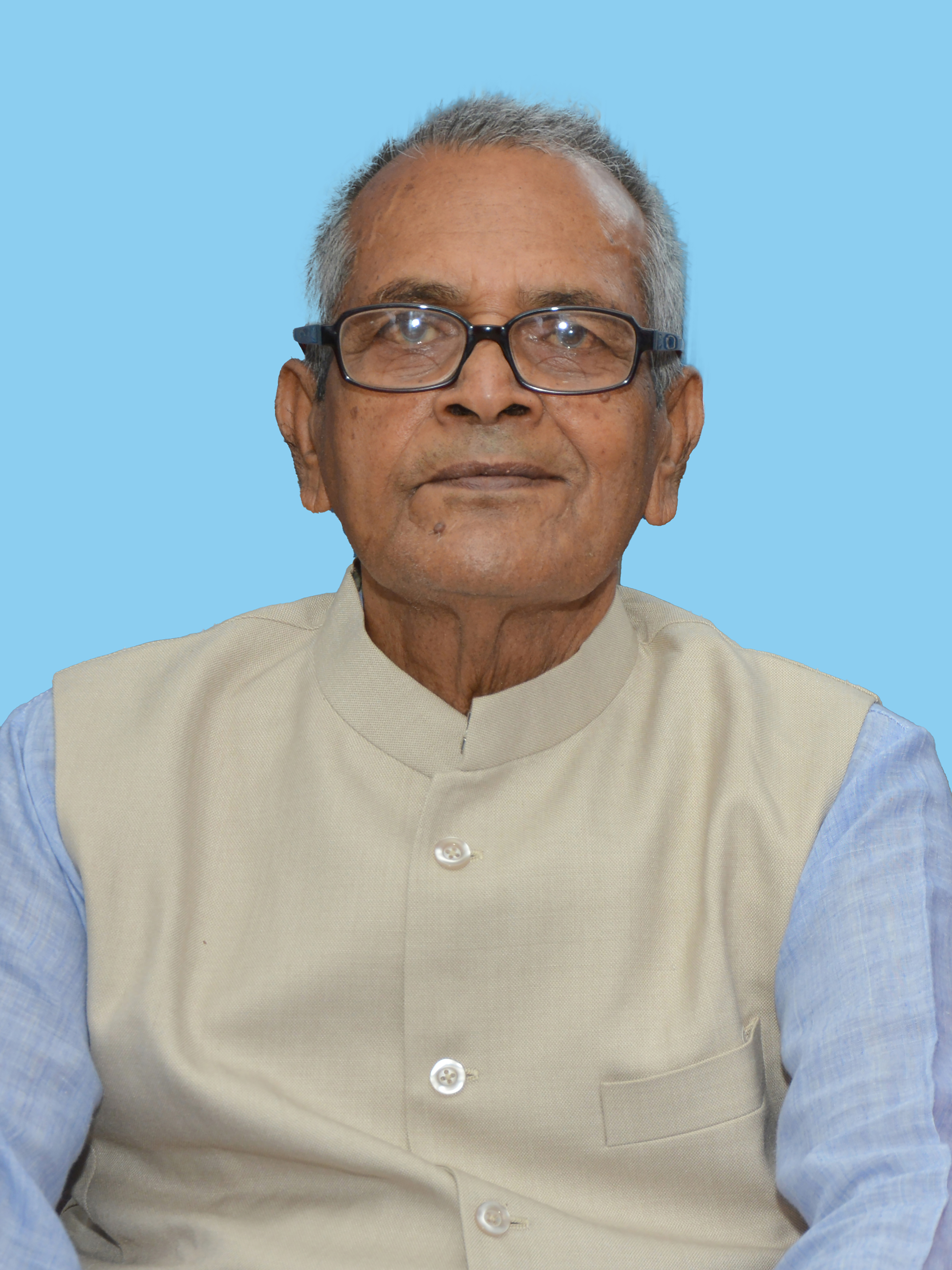
- Mr. Singh in 2018
- Born: 1937 AD; Dhamaura, Mahottari
- Died: 2022 AD; Kathmandu
- Citizenship: Nepal
- Education: Bachelor's degree
- Occupations: Farmer, Social Worker
- Known for: Supporting farmers, inspiring youth for community engagement.
- Notable work: Establishment of Dhamaura Higher Secondary School by donating his own land.
- Spouse: Raj Kumari Devi

Tej Narayan Singh (1937—2022) was a Nepali social worker from Mahottari, known for his contributions to education, agriculture, and community development. He was born in Dhamaura Village in Mahottari District, Nepal. Singh played a role in promoting education in rural areas by founding Dhamaura Higher Secondary School on the land he donated. He also supported the establishment of other schools in the surrounding region.

He supported small-scale farmers by providing assistance in farming practices. He motivated local youth to participate in sports, arts, and cultural programs to improve community engagement.

A heart camp was organized recently in his memory, that served over 600 locals with free medicines and diagnostic tests.

A book titled Jiwanta Sambandha by Om Murti Anil, based on the father-son relationship, was dedicated to Singh, with all proceeds from its sales donated to support elderly people and those in need.
