= Rajamati =

- Nepal Bhasa: राजमति
- Directed by: Neer Shah
- Written by: Durga Lal Shrestha and Ramshekhar Nakarmi
- Produced by: Prabhakar Bikram Rana and Laxmi Narayan Newa
- Starring: Hisila Maharjan; Shree Krishna Shrestha; Maniraj Lawat; Madan Krishna Shrestha; Hari Bansha Acharya; Ganesh Ram Lachhi
- Release date: 1995 (Nepal)
- Country: Nepal
- Language: Nepal Bhasa
- Budget: n/a
- Box office: n/a

Rājamati (Newar: राजमति) is a 1995 Nepali film made in Nepal Bhasa. The first Nepal Bhasa movie is Silu, released in 1987.

Rajamati is about a luckless Newar girl named Rajamati from Kathmandu who gets involved in a series of failed relationships. The story is based on a 200-year-old ballad popular in Newar society. Rajamati was born at Taha Nani in Itum Baha, a historical and sacred neighborhood in central Kathmandu.

== Cast ==
- Hisila Maharjan as Rajamati Shakya
- Shree Krishna Shrestha as Ratna
- Maniraj Lawot as Tuishin
- Madan Krishna Shrestha as Taremam Shakya (Rajamati's father)
- Hari Bansha Acharya
- Ganesh Ram Lachhi
- Subhadra Adhikari as Ratna's mother
- Rajendra Khadgi as Chikacha

== The song ==
The song "Rajamati" is one of the most popular songs of the Newars. It also gained fame because it was played by a guard of honor during the state visit of Prime Minister Jung Bahadur to England in 1850. Maestro Seturam Shrestha made the first recording of the song on gramophone disc in Kolkata in 1908. Prem Dhoj Pradhan composed and sang the Rajamti song in his own style. Prem Dhoj Pradhan sang Rajamati in various stages and functions for many years, making it very popular. He recorded Rajamati song in 1963 in Calcutta Indian, on 78 rpm gramophone.

In the song, a love-struck man tells how much he desires Rajamati, and that he will go to Kashi (Varanasi) and become an ascetic if he doesn't get to marry her. Then he describes her curly hair, long eyes, fair complexion and moles on the cheek.

The song then mentions three sunken waterspouts in Kathmandu, Thahiti uptown, Kwahiti at the southern end and Maruhiti in the center (near Kathmandu Durbar Square); and how Rajamati, who had gone to Maruhiti to fetch water, tripped on a large stone and fell flat on her back.

The singer then laments how Rajamati was given away in marriage over her protestations because of a devious matchmaker, and how she ended up in a house without a decorative window.
