= Mahapurush (2022 film) =

2022 Nepalese film written & directed by Pradip Bhattarai

- Theatrical release poster
- महापुरुष
- Directed by: Pradip Bhattarai
- Written by: Pradip Bhattarai
- Produced by: Rabindra Singh Baniya; Max Dipesh Khatri
- Starring: Hari Bansha Acharya; Madan Krishna Shrestha; Gauri Malla /Rabindra Singh Baniya /Arun Chhetri /Anjana Baraili
- Cinematography: Deepak Bajracharya
- Edited by: Mitra D. Gurung
- Production company: Shatkon Arts
- Release date: 28 October 2022
- Country: Nepal
- Language: Nepali
- Budget: est.रू3.70 crore (US$240,000)
- Box office: रू10.5 crore (US$680,000)

Mahapurush (Nepali: महापुरुष; transl. A great man) is a 2022 Nepali comedy drama film written and directed by Pradip Bhattarai. The film stars Maha Jodi (Madan Krishna Shrestha and Hari Bansha Acharya), along with Gauri Malla, Rabindra Singh Baniya, Rajaram Paudel, Arun Chhetri, and Anjana Baraili. The film is about a widowed father of two sons finds love at an old age and struggles as a society and his own sons disapprove of it. It was released on 28 October 2022, simultaneously in Nepal, United States, Australia, United Kingdom, Japan, South Korea, and the Middle East countries.

The film promoted with Mofasal Bhraman around 8 cities that includes Birtamode, Itahari, Biratnagar, Hetauda, Narayangarh, Butwal, and Pokhara. The film also conducted Deusi-bhailo programs on the streets of Baneshwor, Kathmandu. The promotional event of the film was managed by Nepal Diaries. The film met with positive response from audience with praise directed towards performance of the cast, social message, background score and direction with some critics criticizing it climax. The film was a blockbuster at the box office crossing NPR 10.5 crore gross in Nepal alone and went on to become one of the highest grossing Nepali film of the year.

== Synopsis ==
The story is about a single father who lost his wife years ago; he now lives with his two sons. He falls in love in a later stage of his life. As a result, he must deal with family and social issues, since the idea of getting married at such an age is not a common phenomenon in society and is considered taboo.

== Cast ==
- Hari Bansha Acharya
- Madan Krishna Shrestha
- Gauri Malla
- Rabindra Singh Baniya
- Rajaram Poudyal
- Arun Chhetri
- Anjana Baraili
- Prem Pandey
- Siru Bista
- Kopila Thapa
- Shikha Tamang
- Kabita Shrestha
- Naresh Paudel
- Narendra Kangsakar
- Sabin Bastola
- Arjun Acharya
- Suman Rimal

== Soundtrack ==
No.	Title	Lyrics	Music	Singer(s)	Length
1.	"Baa"	Nawaraj Parajuli	Rhythm Kandel	Rhythm Kandel	4:53
2.	"Aba Gudau Hami"	Ram Abiral Bista	S.D. Yogi	S.D. Yogi, Reshma Pun	4:50
Total length:					9:43

== Reception ==
Mahapurush received mixed reviews from critics, while it received mostly positive reviews from the audience.

Shiva Mukhiya from Online Khabar rated the film 2.5 out of 5, and mentioned: "Mahapurush tells the story of each audience. The actors have justified their characters and their dialogue delivery and acting is natural. Yet, the film has a few glitches in terms of cinematography. Sound and lighting arrangements look awkward sometimes. The film takes a long time to develop the story than it actually deserves, and the makers need to understand that modern audiences value compactness."
