= India Inclusion Summit =

- Host country: India
- Date: 29–30 Nov 2013, 28–29 Nov 2014, 20-21 Nov 2015, 18-19 Nov 2016
- Cities: Bangalore
- Venues: 2013: Ritz-Carlton,2014: Park Plaza Hotels & Resorts, Bangalore,2015: Park Plaza Hotels & Resorts, Bangalore,2016: Park Plaza Hotels & Resorts, Bangalore
- Website: www.indiainclusionsummit.com

India Inclusion Summit, an initiative supported by SAP SE, J.P. Morgan, Australia and New Zealand Banking Group Limited, and Allegis Group, brings together leaders working in the field of inclusion to deliberate, discuss and take forward different talents available in the society. The Summit aims to be an egalitarian platform attracting people from a range of fields. It mainly focused on inclusion for those with physical and mental disabilities. According to a press release, the summit "aims at sensitising the public on issues related to people with IDD (intellectual development disability) through cinema, sports, books and media and will leverage the support of well-known personalities to further the cause of an inclusive society."

== Agenda ==
India Inclusion Summit 2016, its fifth edition, took place on the 18 and 19 November 2016, at Bengaluru. For the first time, India Inclusion Summit invited fellows.

India Inclusion Summit 2015, its fourth edition, took place on 20 and 21 November 2015, at Park Plaza Hotel, Bengaluru. Union Minister of Social Justice and Empowerment Chand was the chief guest and speakers included likes of musician Shankar, advertising and marketing guru, advisor to US President Barack Obama; social worker and Padma shri awardee Dr. Uma Tuli, athlete and Arjuna awardee Deepa Malik, professor of Developmental Psychopathology, University of Cambridge and forerunner in the field of autism research Professor Simon Baron-Cohen, and eminent actor and director Ramesh Aravind. An India Inclusion Summit app to help the visually and hearing impaired was also unveiled.

The third edition, India Inclusion Summit 2014, took place on 28 and 29 November 2014, at Park Plaza Hotel, Marathahalli, Bengaluru. Various luminaries attended the summit and experiential accessibility like sign language interpretation, Live FM narration, ramps, accessible lunch tables, talking washroom mats, blind golf and GPS navigation was presented in the summit.

The key initiatives that are taken in India Inclusion Summit are:

- Support EnAble India's creation of a virtual academy for disabled people.
- Setup two new labs of Project Prayas by the Autism Society of India.
- Help scale Sampoorna Music Therapy School for children with autism.
- Help provide jobs for disabled people through Association for Rehabilitation under National Trust Initiative of Marketing.

== Call for action ==
=== EnAble India ===
India Inclusion Summit is partnering with EnAble India to create a virtual academy for disabled people.

=== Project Prayas by Autism Society of India ===
Prayas is a computer and iPad training programme for individuals with autism spectrum disorders; initiated by the Autism Society of India, running in collaboration with Spastics Society of Karnataka, Indira Nagar, Bangalore. It has been financially and technically supported by SAP Labs India.

== Speakers in attendance ==
Speakers among the India Inclusion Summit were:

- Ramesh Arvind
- Simon Baron-Cohen
- Kiran Bedi, retired Indian Police Service officer
- Ani Choying Drolma
- Arnab Goswami
- Justice N. Santosh Hegde, former Justice of the Supreme Court Of India
- Malathi Krishnamurthy Holla, an international para athlete from India
- Dr A. P. J. Abdul Kalam, former President of India
- Shankar Mahadevan
- Anita Nair, English-language writer
- Devdutt Pattanaik, physician turned Leadership consultant
- Naseeruddin Shah
- Arun Shourie
- Thorkil Sonne, founder of Specialisterne
