= Madan Bahadur Hari Bahadur =

Nepali TV series

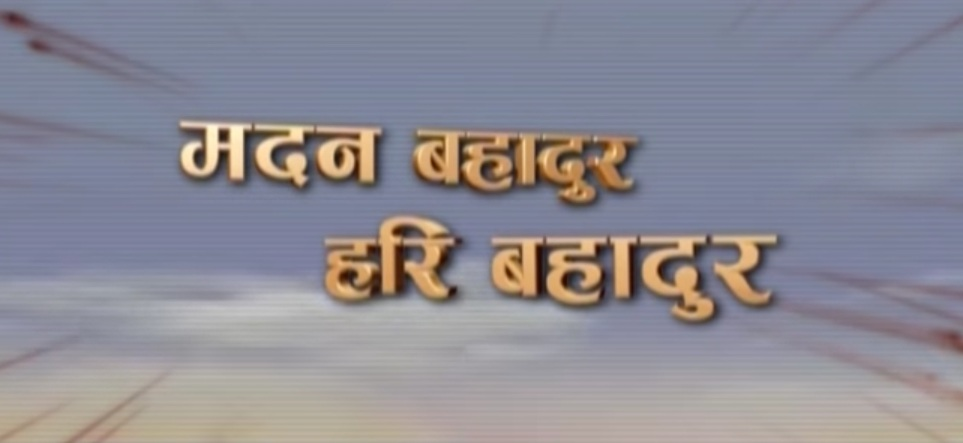
- Title card
- मदनबहादुर हरिबहादुर
- Genre: Sitcom, Drama
- Created by: Madan Krishna Shrestha; Hari Bansha Acharya
- Developed by: MaHa Sanchar
- Written by: Hari Bansha Acharya
- Directed by: Hari Bansha Acharya; Madan Krishna Shrestha
- Starring: Hari Bansha Acharya; Madan Krishna Shrestha; Mishree Thapa; Roshani Sapkota; Raju Bhuju; Sharmila Sharma; Siru Bista
- Country of origin: Nepal
- Original language: Nepali
- No. of seasons: 4
- No. of episodes: 65

Production
- Executive producer: Nepal Television
- Producer: MaHa Sanchar
- Camera setup: Multiple camera
- Running time: 30 minutes

Original release
- Network: NTV
- Release: 2006 – 2011

Madan Bahadur Hari Bahadur (Nepali: मदनबहादुर हरिबहादुर) was a Nepali sitcom television series. Hari Bansha Acharya and Madan Krishna Shrestha were the script writer, director, and the main characters. The show aired on Nepal Television. Integrating political and social topics into a comedy drama, Madan Bahadur Hari Bahadur was one of the most viewed programs in Nepal. The series ended in 2010. Hari Bahadur's character is very popular and widely loved among Nepali people, it is considered one of the funniest in the country's entertainment industry. Other comedians frequently imitate this character on their shows.

== Synopsis ==
Madan Bahadur (Madan Krishna Shrestha) and Hari Bahadur (Hari Bansha Acharya) home village is the subject of the show. Hari Bahadur is notorious for his misdeeds, whereas Madan Bahadur is a well-liked individual. Hari Bahadur frequently attempts to accomplish something unethically, and his methods are always incredibly humorous.

== Cast ==
- Madan Krishna Shrestha as Madan Bahadur
- Hari Bansha Acharya as Hari Bahadur
- Mishree Thapa as Madan Bahadur's wife
- Roshani Sapkota as Alaichi (Hari Bahadur's wife)
- Raju Bhuju as Lahure
- Sharmila Sharma as Lahurini
- Siru Bista as hari Bahadur's daughter-in-law
- Kiran KC as Policeman
- Neer Shah as Policeman
- Shivahari Poudel as Hotel Sahu
- Sandip Chettri as Social activist
- Shishir Rana as Thug
- Kamal Gaule as Dalal

Shambhuraj Thapa as engineer
