= Tarakeshwar =

Municipality in Bagmati Province, Nepal

Tarakeshwar तारकेश्वर
- Municipality (नगरपालिका)
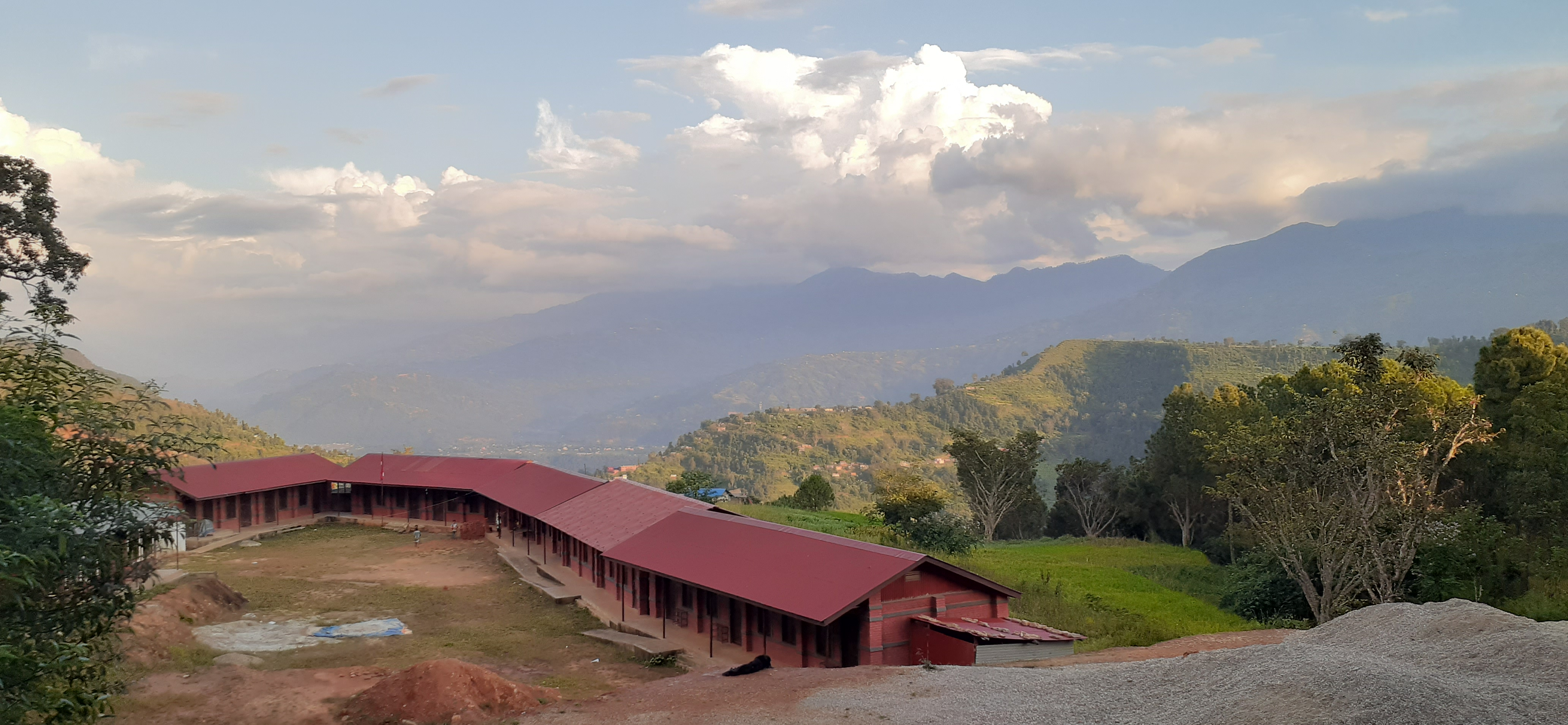
- Ward-6 of Tarakeshwor Municipality

- Location in Nepal Tarakeshwar (Nepal)
- Coordinates: 27°47′12″N 85°18′11″E
- Country: Nepal
- Province: Bagmati
- District: Kathmandu
- Established: December 2014
- Named for: Tarkeshor Mahadev

Government
  - Mayor: Krishna Hari Maharjan (NC)
  - Deputy Mayor: Srijana Burlakoti (NC)

Area
  - Total: 34.9 km^{2} (13.5 sq mi)

Population (2021 Nepal census)
  - Total: 151,479
  - Density: 4,340/km^{2} (11,200/sq mi)
  - Ethnicities: Newar Bahun Chhetri Tamang Magar
- Time zone: UTC+5:45 (NST)
- Website: www.tarakeshwormun.gov.np/en

Tarakeshwar is a municipality in Kathmandu District in Bagmati Province of Nepal that was established on 2 December 2014 by merging the former Village development committees Dharmasthali, Futung, Goldhunga, Jitpurphedi, Kavresthali, Manmaiju and Sangla. The office of the municipality is that of the former Dharmasthali village development committee.

== Demographics ==
Tarakeshwor Municipality has a total population of 81,443 according to 2011 Nepal census. Of these, 72.8% spoke Nepali, 11.5% Newar, 10.7% Tamang, 1.2% Gurung, 1.1% Magar, 0.6% Rai, 0.3% Bhojpuri, 0.3% Maithili, 0.3% Sherpa, 0.2% Tharu, 0.1% Chantyal, 0.1% Ghale, 0.1% Hindi, 0.1% Kham, 0.1% Limbu, 0.1% Urdu and 0.2% other languages as their first language.

In terms of ethnicity/caste, 31.6% were Hill Brahmin, 23.1% Chhetri, 15.5% Newar, 14.2% Tamang, 3.8% Magar, 2.8% Gurung, 1.9% Rai, 1.1% Damai/Dholi, 0.9% Kami, 0.7% Thakuri, 0.5% Sarki, 0.4% Sherpa, 0.4% Tharu, 0.3% Ghale, 0.3% Limbu, 0.3% Musalman, 0.3% Sanyasi/Dasnami, 0.2% Chhantyal, 0.2% other Dalit, 0.2% Gharti/Bhujel, 0.2% Majhi, 0.1% Badi, 0.1% Danuwar, 0.1% Hajjam/Thakur, 0.1% Kalwar, 0.1% Kumal, 0.1% Sunuwar, 0.1% Yadav and 0.2% others.

In terms of religion, 83.3% were Hindu, 12.6% Buddhist, 3.3% Christian, 0.3% Muslim, 0.3% Kirati and 0.1% others.

In terms of literacy, 82.6% could read and write, 1.6% could only read and 15.8% could neither read nor write.

The population of the municipality grew to 151,479 at the 2021 Nepal census. Around 99.7% of the residents were Nepali citizens and 87.8% were literate in 2021.

== Tarkeshwor Mahadev Temple ==
The Tarkeshwor Mahadev Temple is a significant religious site located within the municipality, situated in the Shivapuri Nagarjun National Park.

=== Mythology ===
According to local legend, an ancient drought in the Kathmandu Valley was resolved by a sage who discovered a subterranean cave system within the Tarkeshwor forest. It is believed that this passage extended directly to Gosaikunda Lake. The sage reportedly traversed the cavern to collect holy water and, upon emerging in the Tarkeshwor hills, released it to induce rain.

Although the legendary passage is said to have been blocked by a historical earthquake, several cave systems remain visible on the temple premises. Due to this spiritual connection, devotees who are unable to undertake the pilgrimage to Gosaikunda during Janai Purnima often visit Tarkeshwor Temple to bathe as an alternative.

== See also ==
- Kisandol
