= Pradeep Rimal =

Nepalese musician and director (1937–2015)

- प्रदीप रिमाल
- Born: 30 September 1937; Lubhu, Nepal
- Died: 6 February 2015 (aged 77); Virginia, US
- Education: MA
- Occupations: Film director, cultural anthropologist, lyricist, screenwriter
- Awards: Madan Puraskar

Pradeep Rimal (1937–2015) was a Nepalese film director, lyricist, screenwriter and cultural anthropologist. He is best known for directing Silu, the first Newar language film. In 1971, he won the Madan Puraskar for Karnali Lok Sanskriti. He wrote lyrics for many songs among which 'Kasturi Ho Baas Aauncha Bhanchhan' and 'Yo Barsa Chhodi Malai...' were sung by Narayan Gopal.

== Biography ==
Rimal was born in 1937 (15 Ashoj 1994 BS) in Lubhu village of Lalitpur District of Nepal to father Durga Parsad Rimal and mother Dilli Kumari Rimal.

In 1996, he worked as an assistant director and musician for Maitighar.

He wrote the culture, music and arts related volume of the five–part Karnali Lok Sanskriti. He received the Madan Puraskar for this work alongside Chudamani Bandhu, Bihari Krishna Shrestha, Sthirjunga Bahadur Singh and Satya Mohan Joshi in 1971.

In 1985, he directed Ke Ghar Ke Dera, which featured Maha Jodi. In 1987, he directed the first ever Newar language film titled Silu .

He also wrote lyrics for many songs and directed multiple music videos and infomercials.

He died on 7 February 2015 in Virginia state of United States.

== Notable works ==
=== Book ===
- Karnali Lok Sanskriti (1971)

=== Films ===
Release date	Title of film	Role
16 December 1966	Maitighar	Assistant director and musician
14 February 1968	Hijo Aaja Bholi	Actor
18 February 1974	Man ko Bandh	Dialogue writer
25 September 1977	Kumari	Screenwriter
2 September 1985	Ke Ghar Ke Dera	Director, screenwriter, lyricist
24 October 1987	Silu	Director, screenwriter
3 October 1989	Anyay	Lyricist
6 January 1991	Maya	Director, lyricist
