= Gauthali =

- Theatrical release poster
- Directed by: Dr. Kapil Rijal
- Screenplay by: Dr. Kapil Rijal
- Story by: Dr. Bhola Rijal
- Produced by: Suman Giri; Dr. Kapil Rijal
- Starring: Arun Chhetri; Simran Khadka; Madan Krishna Shrestha; Prakash Ghimire
- Cinematography: Hari Humagain
- Edited by: Milan Shrestha
- Music by: Alish Karki
- Production companies: Bhola Rijal Production; Suman Giri Production
- Distributed by: Rich Entertainment; Apple Entertainment; F.D Company
- Release date: 17 July 2026
- Running time: 140 minutes
- Country: Nepal
- Language: Nepali
- Budget: est. रू2.75 crore (US$180,000)
- Box office: est.रू26.27 crore (US$1.8 million)

Gauthali (Nepali: गौँथली) is a 2026 Nepalese social-drama film written and directed by Dr. Kapil Rijal, based on a story by Dr. Bhola Rijal. Produced under the banners of Bhola Rijal Production and Suman Giri Production, the film stars Arun Chhetri and Simran Khadka in the lead roles, alongside an ensemble cast including Madan Krishna Shrestha, Prakash Ghimire, Loonibha Tuladhar, and Rabindra Jha.

The film explores the social dynamics and emotional hurdles faced by an unconventional couple, highlighting themes of marriage, mental and behavioral health challenges, and the transformative power of education within a family structure. It was released theatrically across Nepal on July 17, 2026.

Upon release, it received mostly positive response from both critics and audiences, who praised its poignant narrative on family dynamics and women's struggles, as well as the performance of its lead actors. The film was a massive blockbuster at the box office, ending its theatrical run after celebrating 100 days and becoming the second highest grossing Nepali film of all time.

== Plot ==
In a conservative village in rural Nepal circa 2001, eighth-grader Gauthali dreams of becoming the first girl from her community to pass the SLC examinations. Her ambitions are cut short when she is forced into a child marriage with Thule, a volatile and socially isolated young man who struggles with severe behavioral health issues. Expecting her to focus solely on domestic labor, Gauthali’s mother-in-law strictly forbids her from continuing her education. Despite the hostility, Gauthali secretly self-studies while managing her daily household chores. Over time, Thule recognizes her determination and begins assisting her with daily errands, allowing her enough time to pass the ninth-grade.

Upon discovering the hidden study sessions, her mother-in-law shatters the books into pieces, prompting Thule to covertly acquire tenth-grade textbooks for her. Gauthali later becomes pregnant and considers abandoning her studies, but her former schoolteacher convinces her to persevere. Tragic complications during childbirth result in the death of her newborn and severely impair her physical health. Devastated by the stillbirth, Gauthali is cruelly blamed by her mother-in-law, who accuses her of being cursed, claiming she 'ate her grandson alive,' and casts her out of the home. Desperate, Gauthali returns to her maiden home, but her family offers no solace, urging her instead to submit to her destiny and return to her husband. Dejected, she secretly flees to the district headquarters.

Exhausted and malnourished, Gauthali collapses in the city and awakes in a hospital, learning that she has permanently lost function in one of her legs. Meanwhile, a distraught Thule leaves the village to search for her. Both struggle to survive in the city independently: Gauthali lands a job as a hotel cook while resuming her studies at night, while Thule works as a manual street porter. Gauthali eventually crosses paths with her former schoolteacher, who arranges for her to officially sit for the SLC examinations through a local urban school.

When the national results are declared, Gauthali emerges as the top-ranking student in the country. To honor her historical achievement, her school organizes a grand victory procession through the city streets. During the celebration, Thule spots Gauthali in the crowd, reuniting the couple. Empowered by her success, they return to their village to start a new life on equal terms.

== Cast ==
- Arun Chhetri as Thule
- Simran Khadka as Gauthali
- Madan Krishna Shrestha as School teacher
- Prakash Ghimire as Thule's father
- Loonibha Tuladhar as Thule's mother
- Rabindra Jha
- Ishwori Baral
- Sanjok Rasaili
- Sita Devi Timilsina

== Soundtrack ==
The film's soundtrack features songs composed by Shambhujeet Baskota, Thaneshwor Gautam, and Prashant Siwakoti, with the film's background score composed by Alish Karki.

No.	Title	Lyrics	Singer(s)	Length
1.	"Aakha Bhari Aansu"	Bhola Rijal	Thaneshwor Gautam, Shanti Shree Pariyar	4:59
2.	"Sapana Harayo"	Prashant Siwakoti	Prashant Siwakoti, Shanti Shree Pariyar	4:23

== Box office ==
Despite a modest opening day, the film quickly received the positive word of mouth to gross रू7.42 crore in just 10 days in Nepal. The film minted रू13.64 crore after third weekend to become the highest grossing film of the year. It wrapped up its theatrical run with a gross of रू26.03 crore, cementing its place as the second highest-grossing Nepali film of all time.
