= Kisandol =

- Village
- Interactive map of Kisandol
- Coordinates: 27°46′22.93″N 85°16′44.79″E

Government
  - Body: Tarakeshwar Municipality

Kisandol is a small village within the Tarakeshwar municipality of Nepal's Kathmandu District. It is located about 9 kilometres (5.6 mi) north Kathmandu. The village is spread over a small hill and has around 200 houses.

== History and development ==
Before 1990, Kisandol had only one school, a small primary school called Jitpur Prathamik Vidyalaya, which was used to educate the men and boys of the village, whose residents were largely impoverished and uneducated. it was also without proper protection from the elements and had to close during inclement weather. At this point, the village as a whole lacked drinking water, plumbing, electricity, and infrastructure such as roads.

In 1989, the NGO Plan International began adopting out girls from Kisandol into families who could send them to good schools, either within or outside of Nepal. They also installed basic plumbing and access to clean drinking water. Kisandol's first road was set in 1990 and a more secure school building was erected in 1992. Within 5 years, it had become the Jitpur Higher Secondary School and in 1998 an additional building was added to accommodate the number of students enrolled. By 2001, Kisandol had higher education classes in arts and commerce. As of 2012, the school was enrolling more female students than males and the village had two additional schools: a high school and a private English boarding school.

As of 2024, it is well equipped with the facilities of electricity, internet services, transportation a d education. Immigration has increased as people from neighboring districts like Nuwakot have started moving in the village for agriculture and commerce.

== Commerce ==
Kisandol has historically been a farming village but by the early 2010s more poultry farms had cropped up.
