= Sangla, Nepal =

Sangla, Nepal साङला
- Town of Tarakeshwar Municipality
- Location in Nepal
- Coordinates: 27.80°N 85.32°E
- Country: Nepal
- Province: No. 3
- District: Kathmandu District

Population (1991)
  - Total: 2,625
- Time zone: UTC+5:45 (Nepal Time)

Sangla is a village and former Village Development Committee that is now part of Tarakeshwar Municipality in Kathmandu District in Province No. 3 of central Nepal. At the time of the 1991 Nepal census it had a population of 2,625 people living in 515 households.
