= Dharmasthali =

Dharmasthali धमाथु
- Village of Tarakeshwar Municipality
- Location in Nepal
- Coordinates: 27.76°N 85.30°E
- Country: Nepal
- Province: No. 3
- District: Kathmandu District

Population (2011)
  - Total: 6,530
- Time zone: UTC+5:45 (Nepal Time)

Dharmasthali is a village and former Village Development Committee that is now part of Tarakeshwar Municipality in Kathmandu District in Province No. 3 of central Nepal. At the time of the 2011 Nepal census it had a population of 6,530 and had 1,421 households in it.

Dharmasthali is popular for its religion & culture of its native Newa village, and Mahankal temple on the top of a hillock and is only four kilometers from Balaju Ring Road. You can also find Buddhist stupa in Dharmasthali. The popular festival of Dharmasthali is on Panha Chahre also commonly known as Ghode Jatra for 5 days. Dharmasthali has also been mentioned in the Gosainkunda, Silu poem. It has been mentioned that Dharmasthali used to be a place of homestay for the pilgrims travelling to Gosainkunda.

Dharmasthali Village Development Committee Consists of 9 wards. Dharmasthali consists of the natives Newa. The main communities are Newa, chettri, and Brahmin. There are about 600 of Newa's and 500 houses of timilsina family .

== Toponymy ==
=== Language origin ===
- Language family: Indoeuropean
- Language: Sanskrit

=== Etymology ===
“Dharma” means religion, duty, virtue, or spiritual practice. “Sthali” means place or land. Therefore, Dharmasthali can be interpreted as “the place of dharma” or “the land dedicated to religion.”

Dharma (धर्म) means “duty, law, religion, virtue” and comes from Sanskrit धर्म (dharma) meaning “righteousness, law, cosmic order.” Sthali (स्थली) means “land, ground, place” and comes from Sanskrit स्थल (sthala) meaning “place, site, ground.” The toponym Dharmasthali is a Sanskritic compound meaning “the sacred place of dharma,” likely referring to a site of religious significance.
