= Ani Choying Drolma =

Chöying Drolma आनी छोइङ डोल्मा
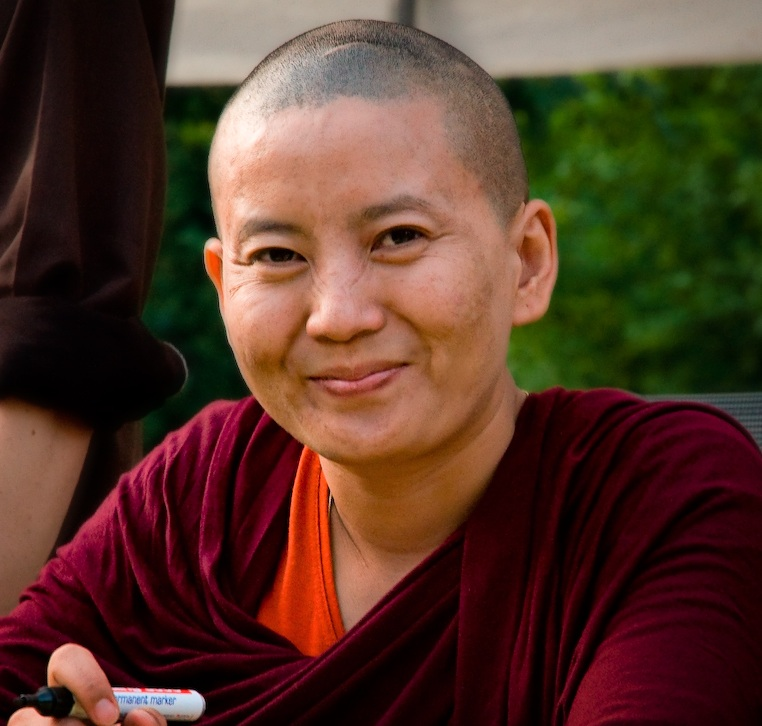
- Chöying Drölma in 2011

Background information
- Born: 4 June 1971 (age 55); Bouddha, Kathmandu, Nepal
- Genres: Buddhist music Buddhist chanting
- Years active: 1994-present
- Labels: Six Degrees Records; Hannibal/Rykodisc Records
- Website: www.choying.com

Ani Choying Drolma (born 4 June 1971), also known as Choying Dolma and Ani Choying (Ani, "nun", is an honorific), is a Nepalese Buddhist nun of Tibetan origin and musician from the Nagi Gompa nunnery in Nepal. She is known in Nepal and throughout the world for bringing many Tibetan Buddhist chants and feast songs to mainstream audiences. She is the UNICEF Goodwill Ambassador to Nepal since 2014. She published her autobiographical book Phoolko Aankhama in 2008.

== Early life ==
Ani Choying was born on 4 June 1972, in Kathmandu, Nepal, to Tibetan exiles. She entered monastic life as a means of escape from her physically abusive father, and she was accepted into the Nagi Gompa nunnery at the age of 13. For a number of years, the monastery's resident chant master (who was trained directly by the wife of Tulku Urgyen Rinpoche) taught Ani Choying the music that she is famous for performing.

== Musical career ==
In 1994, guitarist Steve Tibbetts visited the nunnery and eventually recorded much of the Tibetan music with Ani Choying on two albums. The recordings, titled Chö and Selwa, were released to critical acclaim. Tibbetts and Ani Choying embarked on small performance tours, which included shows at several historical Tibetan monasteries.

=== Discography ===
1. Chö (1997) (with Steve Tibbetts)
2. Dancing Dakini (1999)
3. Choying (2000)
4. Moments Of Bliss (2004)
5. Selwa (2004)
6. Smile (2005)
7. Taking Refuge (2006)
8. Inner Peace (2006)
9. Time (2007)
10. Aama (2009)
11. Matakalaa (2010)
12. Inner Peace 2 (2010)
13. Mangal Vani (2011)
14. Clear Light (2012)
15. Zariya - Ani, A R Rahman, Farah Siraj—Coke Studio (Season 3) at MTV (2013)
16. Rebuilding with Love World Tour

== Humanitarian work ==
Ani Choying has been involved in several humanitarian works. She has advocated the need for an official Earth Anthem for the planet supporting the efforts of Indian poet-diplomat Abhay K in this direction. She was part of India Inclusion Summit where she delivered a heart-warming speech.

== Book ==
She published her autobiographical book Phoolko Aankhama in 2008. The book has been translated into 14 different languages.

== Film ==
"Ani Choying Drolma: Mission Impossible", dir. F. Jennifer Lin, Shan Bai, Hong Kong SAR China 2023
