= Phutung =

Phutung फटुङ्ग
- Village of Tarakeshwar Municipality
- Location in Nepal
- Coordinates: 27.77°N 85.31°E
- Country: Nepal
- Province: No. 3
- District: Kathmandu District

Population (2011)
  - Total: 4,792
- Time zone: UTC+5:45 (Nepal Time)

Phutung is a village and former Village Development Committee that is now part of Tarakeshwar Municipality in Kathmandu District in Province No. 3 of central Nepal. At the time of the 2011 Nepal census it had a population of 4,792 living in 1,064 households.

Although the etymological roots of the word “phutung” is unknown, the word is perhaps related to Tibeto-Burman kirati root meaning “subsidiary”. Accordingly, if its kirati root is true, the name may date back to 500 BC during the era when Tibeto-Burman speaking kirati people ruled the Kathmandu Valley. Please read the history of Kathmandu valley for ancient history of the Kathmandu valley.

The village is the source of name for a technological research institute named Phutung Research Institute for the word rhymes with word photon, the name for the smallest packet of electromagnetic energy.
