= Kumari (1977 film) =

- {Nepali कुमारी
- Directed by: Prem Bahadur Basnet
- Based on: Book
- Produced by: Information Department, the Government of Nepal
- Starring: Salyan KC, Chaitya Devi, Gautam Ratna Tuladhar, Keshav Manandhar, Anand Thapa, Laxmi Shrestha, Shaitoremi Singh
- Cinematography: Shyam Mohan Shrestha
- Edited by: Madhukar Basnet, Satish Koirala
- Release date: 1977 (Nepal)
- Country: Nepal
- Language: Nepali

The movie 'Kumari' was the first Eastman color Nepali film released in 1977. The film was based on a book of story written by author Bijaya Malla. The film's dialogue was written by Pradeep Rimal, and the storyline was written by Prem Bahadur Basnet. The movie's subject is based on the native Newar community. The Royal Nepal Film Corporation of Nepal produced this film.

Director	
Prem Bahadur Basnet	Damodar Prasad Bhattarai
Produced by	Information Department, the Government of Nepal
Story	Bijaya Bahadur Malla
Cinematographer	Shyam Mohan Shrestha
Screenplay	Prem Bahadur Basnet
Script writer	Prem Bahadur Basnet
Casting	Salyan KC, Chaitya Devi, Gautam Ratna Tuladhar, Keshav Manandhar, Anand Thapa, Laxmi Shrestha, Shaitoremi Singh
Editor	Madhukar Basnet, Satish Koirala
Lyricist	Kiran Kharel
Playback Singer	Manik Ratna Tuladhar, Tara Devi
Choreographer	Basanta Shrestha

Ceremony	Category	Recipient	Result
Nepal Motion Picture Award (Nempa) 2045	Best Movie		Awarded
