= Goldhunga =

Goldhunga गोलढुङ्गा
- Village of Tarakeshwar Municipality
- Location in Nepal
- Coordinates: 27.76°N 85.28°E
- Country: Nepal
- Province: No. 3
- District: Kathmandu District

Population (2011)
  - Total: 16,174
- Time zone: UTC+5:45 (Nepal Time)

Goldhunga is a village and former Village Development Committee that is now part of Tarakeshwar Municipality in Kathmandu District in Province No. 3 of central Nepal. According to National Population and Housing Census 2011, there are 3,806 households in the VDC and the total population is 16,174.

== Toponymy ==
=== Linguistic origin ===
- Linguistic family: Indoeuropean
- Language: Sanskrit

=== Etymology ===
“Gol” means round or circular. “Dhunga” means stone. Therefore, Goldhunga can be interpreted as “the place of the round stone” or “the circular rock.”

Gol (गोल) means “round, circular” and comes from Sanskrit गोल (gola) meaning ball, sphere, round object. Dhunga (ढुंगा) means “stone, rock” and comes from Sanskrit शिला (śilā) meaning stone, or स्थूण (sthūṇa) meaning lump/rock, adapted in modern Nepali as ढुंगा (dhungā). The toponym Goldhunga is descriptive in nature, meaning “place of the round stone,” likely referring to a local landmark or notable geological feature.
