= Manmaiju =

Manamaiju मनमैजू फुसिंख्य यें, मनमय्जु (मनमैजु)
- Village of Tarakeshwar Municipality
- Location in Nepal
- Coordinates: 27.75°N 85.31°E
- Country: Nepal
- Province: No. 3
- District: Kathmandu District

Population (1991)
  - Total: 4,590
- Time zone: UTC+5:45 (Nepal Time)
- Postal code: 44610
- Area code: 01

Manamaiju is a village and former Village Development Committee that is now part of Tarakeshwar Municipality in Kathmandu District in Province No. 3 of central Nepal. At the time of the 1991 Nepal census it had a population of 4,590 living in 853 households.It is divided into 4 municipalities.
