= Rajamati (song) =

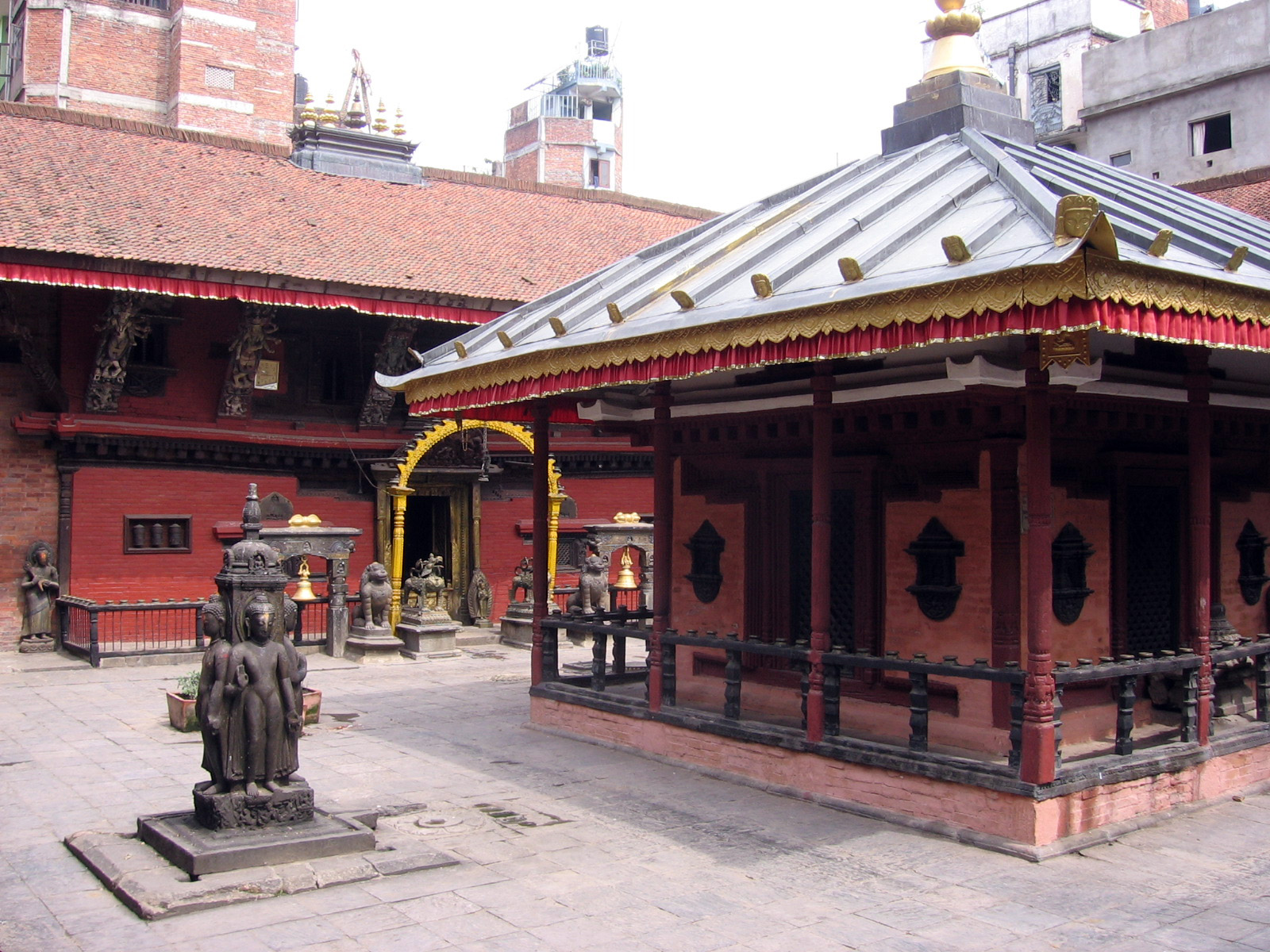
The courtyard of Itum Bahal near where Rajamati lived.

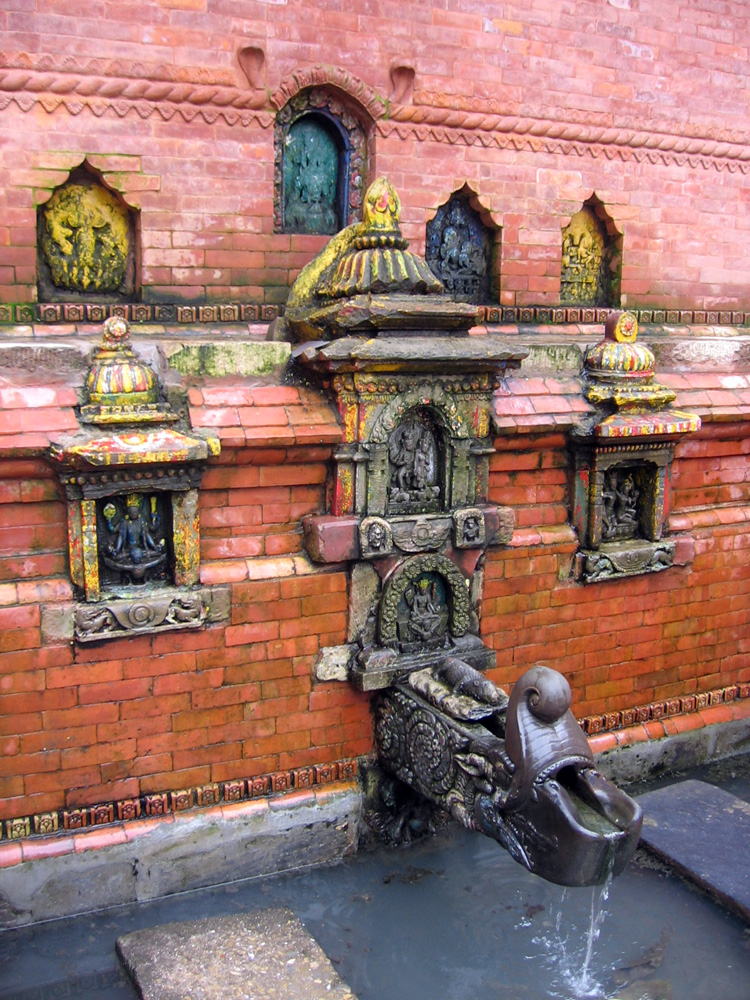
The water spout of Maruhiti where Rajamati famously fell flat on her back.

"Rājamati" (Nepali: राजमति) is a traditional Newari ballad about an unsuccessful love quest, and is the best known song in Newar society of Nepal. Written by Seturam, this song was composed in 1908. It was recorded in the studio in Calcutta (kolkata), it dates from the early 19th century and is based on a true story.

The song in Nepal Bhasa also gained fame because it was played in London during the state visit of Nepalese Prime Minister Jung Bahadur Rana to England in 1850.

It was first recorded on gramophone disc by maestro Seturam Shrestha in Kolkata in 1908. A movie of the same name and based on the story of the song was released in 1995.

Prem Dhoj Pradhan Prem Dhoj Pradhan was the second person to professionally record the folk song Rajamati. In 1956, Prem Dhoj Pradhan encountered Rajamati and immediately recognized both its historical significance and its unrealized potential to reach a wider audience. He re-composed the piece in a modern musical style and refined its lyrics with the help of lyricist Durga Lal Shrestha, before recording it in 1958 at the Hindustan Recording Company in Calcutta.on a 78 rpm gramophone disc. The widely known and popularly performed version of Rajamati heard today is largely based on Prem Dhoj Pradhan's re-composition, which played a significant role in reviving the song and bringing it to a nationwide audience. Following his 1963 recording, Rajamati gained widespread popularity, eventually inspiring the production of the film Rajamati, for which Pradhan performed the title song.

== Synopsis ==
Rajamati was a beautiful girl from Kathmandu who attracted many suitors. However, despite her protests, a devious matchmaker marries her off to a poor family. She was born in Taha Nani, Itum Bahal, a historic neighbourhood in central Kathmandu.

In the song, a man who is infatuated with Rajamati expresses his love for her and threatens to leave home, go to Kashi and become an ascetic if he doesn't get to marry her. He then describes her hair, eyes, complexion, and the mole on her cheek. The song also recounts a famous incident involving Rajamati: how she once went to collect water from the spout at Maruhiti, tripped over a large stone, and fell flat on her back.

== Evidence of a real Rajamati ==
In 1995, artist Uday Charan Shrestha created a painting of Rajamati. He started researching in 1993, and after two years, he finished the oil painting, which took him almost six months to complete. A poster of the painting was published in the Samdhyatimes in 1996 to celebrate the Nepal Sambat New Year. During his research, the artist found evidence in the form of documents from the Archaeology Department of the Nepalese government. In 1884 BS (1827 AD), Rajamati Bada, a widow, sold 64 moharu of her house in Taabaa, located in Lagan. The sale was witnessed by Wilawati Bada (son) and Bhajumati Bada (uncle-in-law). Similarly, 60 moharu of Guthi land (dyaguthi) was sold in 1892 BS (1835 AD).

== Movie ==
A movie of the same name and based on the song and directed by Neer Shah was released in 1995. It is the second big screen film to be made in Nepal Bhasa. Prem Dhoj Pradhan sang the Rajamati song again in a movie, as he was the one who revived it, and he performed it in several different versions. Since then, the song has been recorded by many artists.

== Lyrics ==
=== Newar script ===
𑐬𑐵𑐖𑐵𑐩𑐟𑐶 𑐎𑐸𑐩𑐟𑐶 𑐖𑐶𑐎𑐾 𑐰𑐳𑐵 𑐥𑐶𑐬𑐟𑐷
𑐴𑐵𑐫 𑐧𑐵𑐧𑐵 𑐬𑐵𑐖𑐵𑐩𑐟𑐶 𑐔𑐵…
𑐬𑐵𑐖𑐵𑐩𑐟𑐶 𑐩𑐧𑐶𑐮 𑐢𑐵𑐳𑐵 𑐎𑐵𑐳𑐷 𑐰𑐣𑐾 𑐟𑐾𑐮 𑐧𑐹𑐧𑐵
𑐴𑐫𑐵 𑐧𑐶𑐫𑐸 𑐬𑐵𑐖𑐵𑐩𑐟𑐶 𑐔𑐵….

𑐳𑑃 𑐢𑐵𑐳𑐵 𑐎𑐸𑐮𑐶 𑐎𑐸𑐮𑐶 𑐩𑐶𑐏𑐵 𑐢𑐵𑐳𑐵 𑐧𑐵𑑃𑐮𑐵 𑐧𑐵𑑃𑐮𑐵
𑐳𑐎𑐸 𑐩𑐶𑐫𑐵 𑐩𑑂𑐴𑑂𑐫𑐵 𑐩𑐔𑐵 𑐮𑐵
𑐏𑑂𑐰𑐵 𑐢𑐵𑐳𑐵 𑐟𑐸𑐫𑐸 𑐏𑑂𑐰𑐵 𑐏𑑂𑐰𑐵𑐮𑐾 𑐣𑐶𑐐𑐵 𑐟𑐷 𑐡𑐸
𑐟𑐴𑐵 𑐣𑐣𑐶𑐫𑐵 𑐬𑐵𑐖𑐵𑐩𑐟𑐶 𑐔𑐵….

𑐏𑐾𑑄 𑐏𑑂𑐰𑐮𑐵 𑐢𑑂𑐫𑐵𑐎𑑂𑐰𑐾 𑐡𑑄, 𑐥𑐳 𑐧𑐖𑐶 𑐢𑐸 𑐡𑑄
𑐬𑐵𑐖𑐩𑐟𑐶 𑐨𑐸𑐮𑐸 𑐳𑐸𑐮𑑂𑐬𑐸 𑐡𑑄
𑐬𑐵𑐖𑐩𑐟𑐶 𑐐𑐣 𑐡𑐸, 𑐂𑐟𑐸𑐩𑑂 𑐧𑐵𑐴𑐵𑐮𑐫𑑂 𑐕𑐩𑑂𑐴 𑐡𑐸
𑐴𑐫𑐵 𑐧𑐶𑐄 𑐬𑐵𑐖𑐩𑐟𑐶-𑐔𑐵

𑐣𑑂𑐴𑐵𑐥𑐵 𑐰𑐩𑑂𑐴 𑐟 𑐟𑐴𑑂𑐬𑐶 𑐠𑐎𑐸𑑄, 𑐮𑐶𑐥𑐵 𑐰𑐩𑑂𑐴 𑐔𑐶𑐴𑑂𑐬𑐷 𑐠𑐎𑐸𑑄
𑐰𑐫𑐵 𑐮𑐶𑐥𑐵 𑐬𑐵𑐖𑐩𑐟𑐶-𑐔𑐵
𑐟𑐴𑑂𑐬𑐶 𑐠𑐎𑐸𑑄 𑐩𑐫𑑀 𑐖𑐶𑐟, 𑐔𑐶𑐴𑑂𑐬𑐷 𑐠𑐎𑐸𑑄 𑐩𑐶𑐮𑐾 𑐩𑐖𑐸
𑐬𑐵𑐖𑐩𑐟𑐶 𑐧𑑂𑐫𑐵𑐴𑐵 𑐫𑐵𑐣𑐵 𑐧𑐶𑐄

𑐟𑐴𑑂𑐬𑐶 𑐠𑐎𑐸 𑐫𑐵 𑐟𑐵𑐫𑐵 𑐡𑐸, 𑐔𑐶𑐴𑑂𑐬𑐷 𑐠𑐎𑐹 𑐫𑐵 𑐥𑐵𑐫𑑀 𑐡𑐸
𑐬𑐵𑐫𑐵𑐩𑐟𑐶 𑐫𑐵 𑐰𑐶𑐖𑐎𑐣𑐶 𑐡𑐸
𑐧𑐶𑐖𑐎𑐟𑐶 𑐩𑐬𑐸𑐩𑑂𑐴, 𑐎𑐮𑐵 𑐖𑑂𑐴𑑂𑐟𑐶 𑐩𑐫 𑐧𑐸𑐧𑐵
𑐴𑐫𑐵 𑐧𑐶𑐫𑐸 𑐬𑐵𑐖𑐵𑐩𑐟𑐶 𑐔𑐵……

𑐠𑐵𑐣𑐾 𑐫𑐵 𑐠𑐴𑐶𑐟𑐶, 𑐎𑑂𑐰𑐣𑐾 𑐫𑐵 𑐎𑑂𑐰𑐴𑐶𑐟𑐶
𑐧𑐶𑐔𑐾 𑐮𑐵𑐎 𑐩𑐬𑐸𑐴𑐶𑐟𑐶
𑐩𑐬𑐸𑐴𑐶𑐟𑐶𑐂 𑐮𑑅 𑐎𑐵 𑐰𑐩𑑂𑐴, 𑐟𑐐𑑂𑐰 𑐮𑑀𑐴𑑃𑐟𑐫𑑂 𑐮𑐸𑐦𑐶𑑄 𑐴𑐵𑐣𑐵
𑐬𑐵𑐖𑐩𑐟𑐶 𑐠𑐳 𑐥𑐵𑐮 𑐣𑑂𑐴𑐵

𑐟𑐶𑐳𑐵 𑐣𑑄 𑐟𑐶𑐫𑐎𑐵, 𑐐𑐸𑐖𑐬𑐵𑐟𑐷 𑐥𑐸𑐫𑐎𑐵
𑐬𑐵𑐖𑐩𑐟𑐶 𑐧𑑂𑐫𑐵𑐴𑐵 𑐫𑐵𑐣𑐵 𑐧𑐶𑐄
𑐬𑐵𑐖𑐩𑐟𑐶 𑐧𑐶𑐮 𑐢𑐵𑐳𑐵 𑐎𑐵𑐱𑐷 𑐰𑐣𑐾 𑐩𑐏𑐸 𑐧𑐸𑐧𑐵
𑐴𑐫𑐵 𑐧𑐶𑐄 𑐬𑐵𑐖𑐩𑐟𑐶-𑐔𑐵

=== Devanagari script ===
राजामति कुमति जिके वसा पिरती
हाय बाबा राजामति चा…
राजामति मबिल धासा कासी वने तेल बूबा
हया बियु राजामति चा….

सँ धासा कुलि कुलि मिखा धासा बाँला बाँला
सकु मिया म्ह्या मचा ला
ख्वा धासा तुयु ख्वा ख्वाले निगा ती दु
तहा ननिया राजामति चा….

खें ख्वला ध्याक्वे दं, पस बजि धु दं
राजमति भुलु सुल्रु दं
राजमति गन दु, इतुम् बाहालय् छम्ह दु
हया बिउ राजमति-चा

न्हापा वम्ह त तह्रि थकुं, लिपा वम्ह चिह्री थकुं
वया लिपा राजमति-चा
तह्रि थकुं मयो जित, चिह्री थकुं मिले मजु
राजमति ब्याहा याना बिउ

तह्रि थकु या ताया दु, चिह्री थकू या पायो दु
रायामति या विजकनि दु
बिजकति मरुम्ह, कला ज्ह्ति मय बुबा
हया बियु राजामति चा……

थाने या थहिति, क्वने या क्वहिति
बिचे लाक मरुहिति
मरुहितिइ लः का वम्ह, तग्व लोहँतय् लुफिं हाना
राजमति थस पाल न्हा

तिसा नं तियका, गुजराती पुयका
राजमति ब्याहा याना बिउ
राजमति बिल धासा काशी वने मखु बुबा
हया बिउ राजमति-चा

=== Romanized ===
Rājamati kumati, jike wasā pirati
Hāya bābā Rājamati-chā
Rājamati mabila dhāsā Kāshi wane tela bubā
Hayā biu Rājamati-chā.

San dhāsā kuli kuli, mikhā dhāsā bālā bālā
Sakumi yā mhyāy machā lā
Khwā dhāsā tuyu khwā, khwālay niga tee du
Tāhā Nani yā Rājamati-chā.

Khen khwalā dhyākway dan, pasa baji dhu dan
Rājamati bhulu sulu dan
Rājamati gana du, Itum Bāhālay chhamha du
Hayā biu Rājamati-chā.

Nhāpā wamha Tarhi Thakun, lipā wamha Chirhi Thakun
Wayā lipā Rājamati-chā
Tarhi Thakun mayo jita, Chirhi Thakun mile maju
Rājamati byāhā yānā biu.

Tarhi Thakun yā tāyo du, Chirhi Thakun yā pāyo du
Rājamati yā bijakani du
Bijakani marumha, kalā jita mayo bubā
Hayā biu Rājamati-chā.

Thane yā Thahiti, kwane yā Kwahiti
Biche lāka Maruhiti
Maruhitii la kā wamha, tagwa lohantay luphin hānā
Rājamati thasa pāla nhā.

Tisā nan tiyakā, Gujerati puyakā
Rājamati bhyāhā yānā biu
Rājamati bila dhāsā Kāshi wane makhu bubā
Hayā biu Rājamati-chā.

== Translation ==
Oh dear Rajamati, if you come to me, I will give you my love. If she is not given to me, I will go to Kashi, my father. Bring her to me. Her hair is curly and her eyes are beautiful. Is she the daughter of a man from Sankhu? Her face is fair and there are two moles on it. Oh dear Rajamati of Taha Nani. There are eggshells in the corner and rice flakes from the market have been ground to dust. Rajamati's hair is dishevelled. There is one in Itum Bahal. Bring me dear Rajamati. The girl in front is Tarhi Thakun; the one behind her is Chirhi Thakun. Dear Rajamati is behind them. I don't like Tarhi Thakun; Chirhi Thakun is unsuitable. Marry me to Rajamati. Tarhi Thakun has a 'tāyo' locket and anklets, and Rajamati has ear ornaments. I do not want a wife without ear ornaments. Bring me, dear Rajamati! Thahiti lives in the north, Kwahiti in the south. Between them lies Maruhiti. She went to Maruhiti to fetch water and tripped on a large stone. Rajamati fell flat on her back. Decorate her with jewellery and let the flutes play. Marry me to Rajamati. If Rajamati is given to me, I will not go to Kashi, Father. Bring me, dear Rajamati.

== See also ==
- Rajamati (film)
