= Seturam Shrestha =

Bhaju Nabin Prajapati Seturam Shrestha सेतुराम श्रेष्ठ
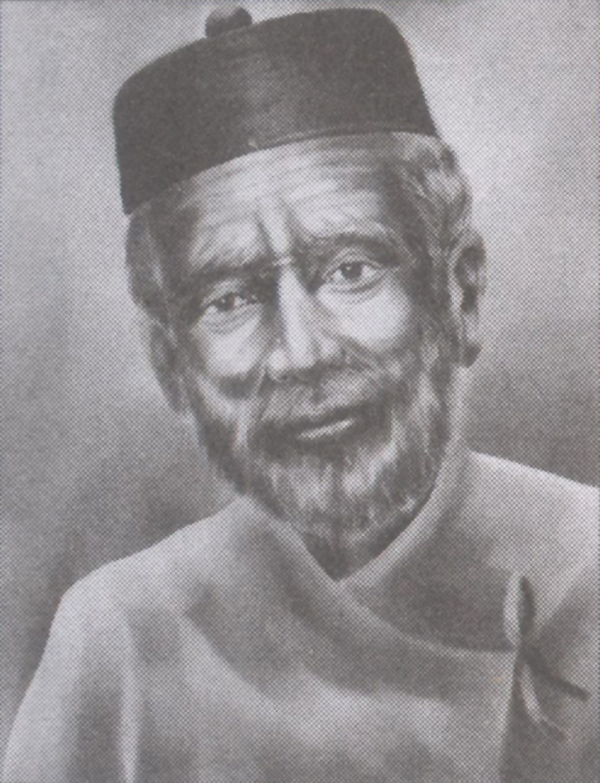
- Seturam Shrestha in 1941
- Born: 1891; Asan, Kathmandu, Nepal
- Died: 1941 (aged 49–50); Nepal
- Parents: Krishna Dhar (father); Hari Devi Shrestha (mother)

Seturam Shrestha (Nepali: सेतुराम श्रेष्ठ) (1891-1941) was a Nepalese musician, singer and composer. He was an important figure in the development of modern music in Nepal at the beginning of the 20th century, and has been hailed as an Ustad. In addition to songs of love, Seturam sang songs with messages of social reform.

In 1908, he became the first Nepalese artiste to record a song on gramophone disc. Among the songs he recorded in a studio in Kolkata, India was the iconic Rajamati. Janak Lal Shrestha, proprietor of Bhadrakali House, the main record store in Kathmandu then, sponsored the recording session.

Seturam has also been credited with pioneering ghazal music in Nepal. Ghazal is a poetic form with origins in ancient Arabic verse that expresses the beauty of love.

== Early life ==
Seturam was born in Asan Kamalachhi, Kathmandu to father Krishna Dhar and mother Hari Devi Shrestha.His father, Krishnadhar, was also musically inclined. From a young age, Seturam showed an exceptional talent for music, learning the harmonium and vocal techniques informally at home.

== Career ==
In 1965BS, Seturam traveled to Kolkata (then Calcutta) to record music at the Bhadra Kali House. Among the pieces he recorded was a gajal written by Motiram Bhatta titled: "यता हेरियो यतै मेरा नजरमा राम प्यार छन्" (Yeta heriyo yatai mera nazarma Ram pyara chhan). This marked one of the earliest formal recordings of Nepali music.

He recorded more than 30 songs across genres, including Ghazals, Bhajans, Jhyāure (folk) and Newari songs. His popular songs included:

- Rajamati- राजमती
- Ae aama sanima fulko thuga khasyo- ए आमा सानीमा फूलको ठुँगो खस्यो पानीमा
- Jhaljhali maiya- झलझली मैया पथाली बोलाउँदा बोल्दिनौ
