= Je Bho Ramrai Bho =

- Directed by: Hari Bansha Acharya
- Written by: Hari Bansha Acharya
- Produced by: Kiran K.C
- Release date: 3 December 2003 (Nepal)
- Country: Nepal
- Language: Nepali

Je Bho Ramrai Bho (Nepali:जे भो राम्रै भो) is a 2003 Nepali film written and directed by Hari Bansha Acharya.

== Cast ==
- Hari Bansha Acharya ... Nabin/Rabin
- Rajesh Hamal... Shambhu
- Jal Shah ... Nabina
- Madan Krishna Shrestha

== See also ==
- Cinema of Nepal
- List of Nepalese films
