= Silu (song) =

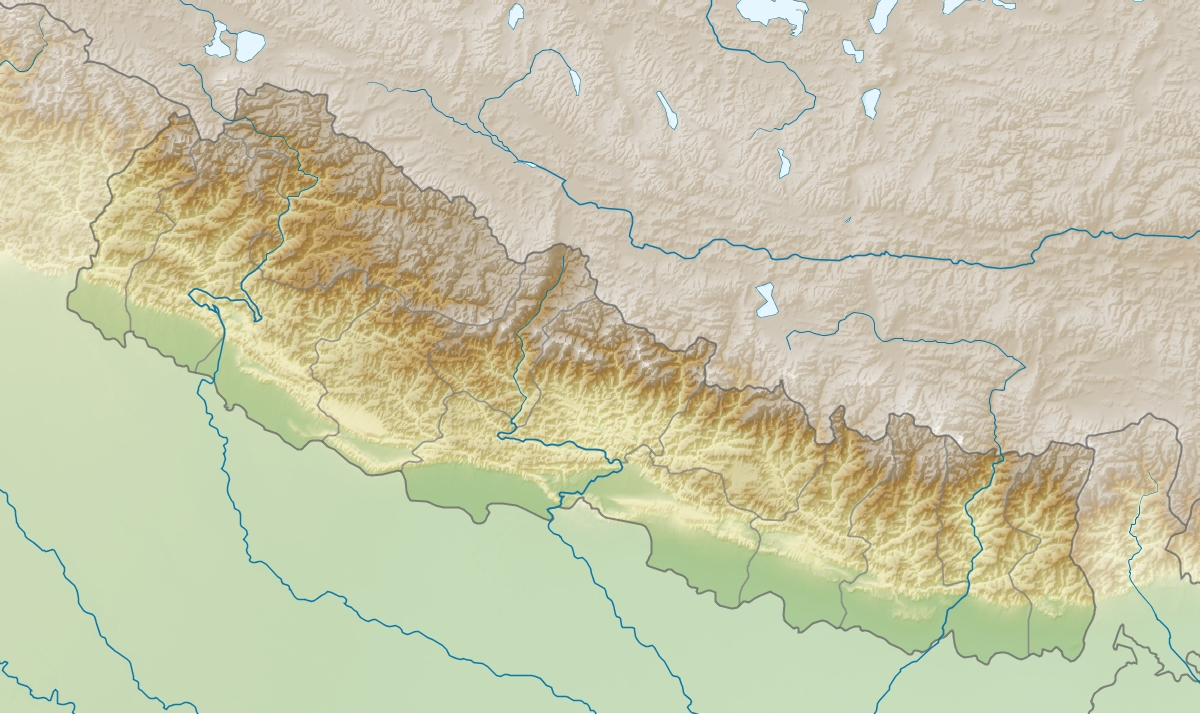
Location in Nepal

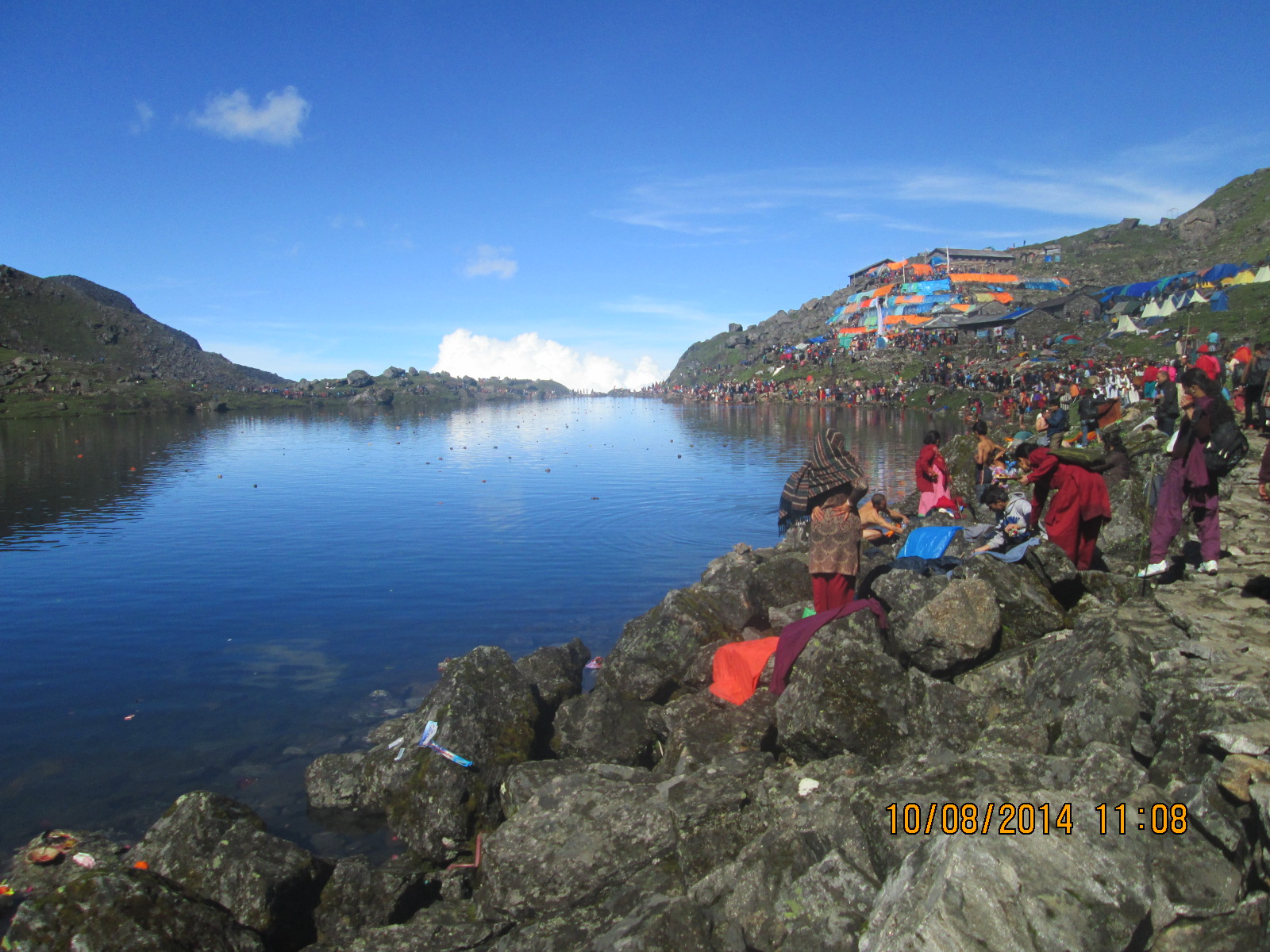
Pilgrims at Lake Gosaikunda (Silu)

"Silu" (Nepal Bhasa: 𑐳𑐶𑐮𑐸 and Devanagari:सिलु) is a traditional Nepalese song about a couple from Kathmandu who go on a pilgrimage to Silu and get separated.

The ballad in Nepal Bhasa dates from the early 15th century.

Written by an unnamed composer, Silu is a popular seasonal song in Newar society. It is one of the six seasonal songs and is sung during the rainy season (August).

Silu is what the Newars call Gosaikunda, a holy lake located to the north of Kathmandu. Situated at an elevation of 4,380 m in the Himalaya, it is associated with the Hindu deity Lord Shiva. The lake is also held sacred by Buddhists who associate it with the Bodhisattva Avalokitesvara.

== Synopsis ==
The epic song is in the form of a dialogue between the husband and wife. When he announces his plan to visit Silu to take part in the ritual bathing festival, she expresses her desire to go with him. He tries to dissuade her by reminding her of the saying that a husband and wife going together is bad luck. But she insists, and he lets her come along.

When they reach Silu, the king sees her and sends soldiers to take her away and forcibly makes her his queen. The depressed husband leaves home and becomes an ascetic.

One day, the queen asks the king to assemble all the ascetics on the palace grounds to give them alms. The sadhus are gathered as per her wish, and when she spots her husband among them, she slips away with him disguised as a nun. The couple are thus reunited.

== Pilgrimage ==
Silu Wanegu, the pilgrimage to Silu to take a holy dip in the lake, is a long-standing tradition in Newar society. The trek is done in August, when a festival is held on the full moon day.

The pilgrimage has also been a subject of art since historical times. Silu, a movie based on the ballad, was released in 1987.

== Lyrics ==
The first few lines of the song appear below.

Nepal Bhasa

हाय हाय प्रभु स्वामि छि गन झायेतेना

छन्त धन्दा छाय मिसा ज्याखं याना चोना

छिव जिव चोना प्रभु सल्हा साहुति मदु
गन झाय तेना प्रभू गन वने तेना

सिलु तिर्थ मोल ल्हुय अति पुण्य लाइ
सिलु तिर्थ वनेयात पासा माला वया

पासा माले मते प्रभु छिव जिव वने
निम्हतेपु सिलु वने अति पुण्य लाइ

छव जिव वनेयात जोसी केने मानि
जोशी केना स्वयां झिपि वायः माली धाल

Translation

(Wife) Oh, husband, where have you been
(Husband), wife, I went on an errand.
(Wife) We live together but there is no consultation
Where have you been, husband, where did you go?
(Husband) Taking a bath at Silu will bring much merit
I had gone to look for a friend to go to Silu.
(Wife) Don't look for a friend, husband, you and I will go
A couple going to Silu will bring much merit.
(Husband) For us to go, we will have to consult an astrologer
I went to an astrologer and he said we will be separated.

== See also ==
- Silu (film)
- Gosaikunda
