= Uma Tuli =

Indian social worker and educationist

- Born: 3 March 1943 (age 83); New Delhi, India
- Occupation: Social worker
- Years active: since 1981
- Awards: Padma Shri; Nehru Smriti Award and President's Gold Medal; Hong Kong Foundation Award; UN-ESCAP Award; Jhunjhunwala Award; Manv Seva Award; Helen Keller Award; Women Achiever's Award; Lakshmipat Singhania – IIM National Leadership Award
- Website: Official web site of Amar Jyoti Charitable Trust

Uma Tuli is an Indian social worker, educationist and the founder of Amar Jyoti Charitable Trust, a Delhi-based non-governmental organisation, working for the rehabilitation of physically disabled people. She was honoured by the Government of India, in 2012, with the fourth highest Indian civilian award of Padma Shri.

== Background and education ==
Uma Tuli was born on 3 March 1943 in New Delhi into a Punjabi Hindu Khatri family of the Tuli clan. She secured a master's degree from Jiwaji University, Gwalior and followed it with another master's degree in Special Education (MEd) from the University of Manchester. Later, she obtained a doctoral degree from the University of Delhi in English Literature. She has had a career teaching at various colleges in Delhi and Gwalior for over thirty years.

== Foundation ==
Tuli founded Amar Jyoti Charitable Trust, with the savings she accumulated from her salary as a teacher, in 1981. The institution over the years has grown in stature to become a single window provider of inclusive education, healthcare, vocational training, employment, sports and cultural facilities for physically disabled people. The institution has networked with Delhi University for courses in Physiotherapy, with Roehampton University for teachers' training in special education and also with Manipal University (MAHE), Madhya Pradesh Bhoj Open University and Indira Gandhi National Open University. It also has a branch in Gwalior.

== Career ==
=== Achievements and initiatives ===
Tuli is the first non-bureaucrat to be appointed as the Chief Commissioner for Persons with Disability, a position she held from 2001 until 2005. During her tenure, she initiated efforts to set up mobile courts, hassle-free distribution of disability certificates for concessional travel in bus and train, and ridding public places of barriers so that persons with disability have easy access. She led the Home Guards contingent in the 1978 Republic Day Parade, the first lady commander to do so. Her efforts are reported behind the participation of Amar Jyoti students at the 1995 Republic Day Parade, reported to be a first for physically disabled children. She is also reported to have contributed to the conduct of five National Integrated Sports Meets, where children with disabilities competed with normal children. She was the leader of the Indian contingent of the Indian contingent for the 5th Abilympics held at Prague, Czech Republic, in 2000 and led the team that organised the 6th Abilympics held in New Delhi in 2003 under the aegis of Amar Jyoti. Tuli has also published many articles and books such as The Spirit Triumphs and Better Care of Children with Locomotor Disability and has presented papers at several national and international seminars and conferences.

=== Positions ===
Tuli is the Managing Secretary of Amar Jyoti Charitable Trust since its inception in 1981. She served as the Chief Commissioner for Persons with Disabilities for Government of India for a period of five years from 2001, has held the chair of the Education Commission of the Rehabilitation International, USA and is its National Secretary She has been a member of the National Human Rights Commission and has served the advisory board of Voice and Vision, a Mumbai-based resource and training centre for children with multiple disabilities. She is the Secretary General of the National Abilympic Association of India and is an executive member of the International Abilympic Federation. She is also the patron of Society for Empowerment and Trade Upliftment of Artisans (SETU), a non-governmental organisation working for the development of the weaker sections of the society.

== Awards and recognition ==
Roehampton University, London has conferred the degree of Doctor of Law (Honoris Causa) on Uma Tuli for her services to inclusive education. Amar Jyoti, under Tuli's leadership, received two national awards, one as the best institution in 1991 and the other, for creating barrier-free premises. She has received the Nehru Smriti Award and President's Gold Medal (1981), Hong Kong Foundation award (1987), UN-ESCAP award (1998) Jhunjhunwala award (1998), Manv Seva award (1998) and Helen Keller award (1999).

A recipient of the Women Achiever's award from the Consortium of Women Achievers, Tuli has also been honoured by the Berkeley city, Michigan, USA with a special recognition citation. She received the Lakshmipat Singhania – IIM National Leadership Award in 2010 and, two years later, she was included by the Government of India in the Republic Day honours list for the civilian award of Padma Shri.

In August 2018 Power Brands awarded Dr. Uma Tuli the Bharatiya Manavata Vikas Puraskar for being a pioneer of inclusive education, a social activist and rights leader who has been fighting for disability rights over the last four decades and for her relentless hard work and lifelong commitment to her mission of an India which places its citizens with disability on the same platform as a non-disabled citizen.

== See also ==
- Inclusion (education)
- Rehabilitation International
