= Phoolko Aankhama =

Autobiography by Ani Choying Dolma

- Cover page of the book
- Author: Ani Choying Dolma
- Original title: फूलको आँखामा
- Language: Nepali
- Genre: Autobiography
- Publisher: Nepa~laya Publication
- Publication date: April 21, 2008
- Publication place: Nepal
- Media type: Print
- Pages: 274
- ISBN: 9789937874090
- Website: Phoolko Aankhama

Phoolko Aankhama (Nepali: फूलको आँखामा) is an autobiography by singer and writer Ani Choying Dolma. It was published on April 21, 2008. Ani Choying Dolma is a Nepalese Buddhist nun of Tibetan origin. The book has been translated into 14 languages.

The title of the book is a reference to a popular Nepali song sung by the author.

== Translations ==
- Italian: La mia voce per la libertà (2008) by A. Prado
- English: Singing for Freedom (2009)
- Portuguese: A minha voz pela liberdade (June 2009) by Ana Syder Fontinha
- German : Ich singe für die Freiheit: Die Lebensreise einer buddhistischen Nonne (2009) by Eliane Hagedorn and Bettina Runge
- Romanian: Confesiunile unei călugărițe budiste (2017) by Dana Soloveanu
- Polish: Tybetańska mniszka. Chcę wyśpiewać wolność by Andrzej Sobol-Jurczykowski
- French: Ma voix pour la liberté, (2008) Editeur : OH !, Laurence Debril, foreword Matthieu Ricard

== See also ==
- Singha Durbarko Ghumne Mech
- Antarmanko Yatra
- Jiwan Kada Ki Phool
