= Jitpurphedi =

Jitpurphedi जीतपुरफेदी
- Village of Tarakeshwar Municipality
- Location in Nepal
- Coordinates: 27.78°N 85.28°E
- Country: Nepal
- Province: No. 3
- District: Kathmandu District

Population (2011)
  - Total: 5,135
- Time zone: UTC+5:45 (Nepal Time)

Jitpurphedi is a village and former Village Development Committee that is now part of Tarakeshwar Municipality in Kathmandu District in Province No. 3 of central Nepal. At the time of the 1991 Nepal census it had a population of 5,135 and had 1,103 households in it.

It is exactly located on northern part of Kathmandu, below Tarkeshwor Temple (One of the Hindu temple).
