= Dhamaura =

Dhamaura धमौरा रौजा
- Village development committee
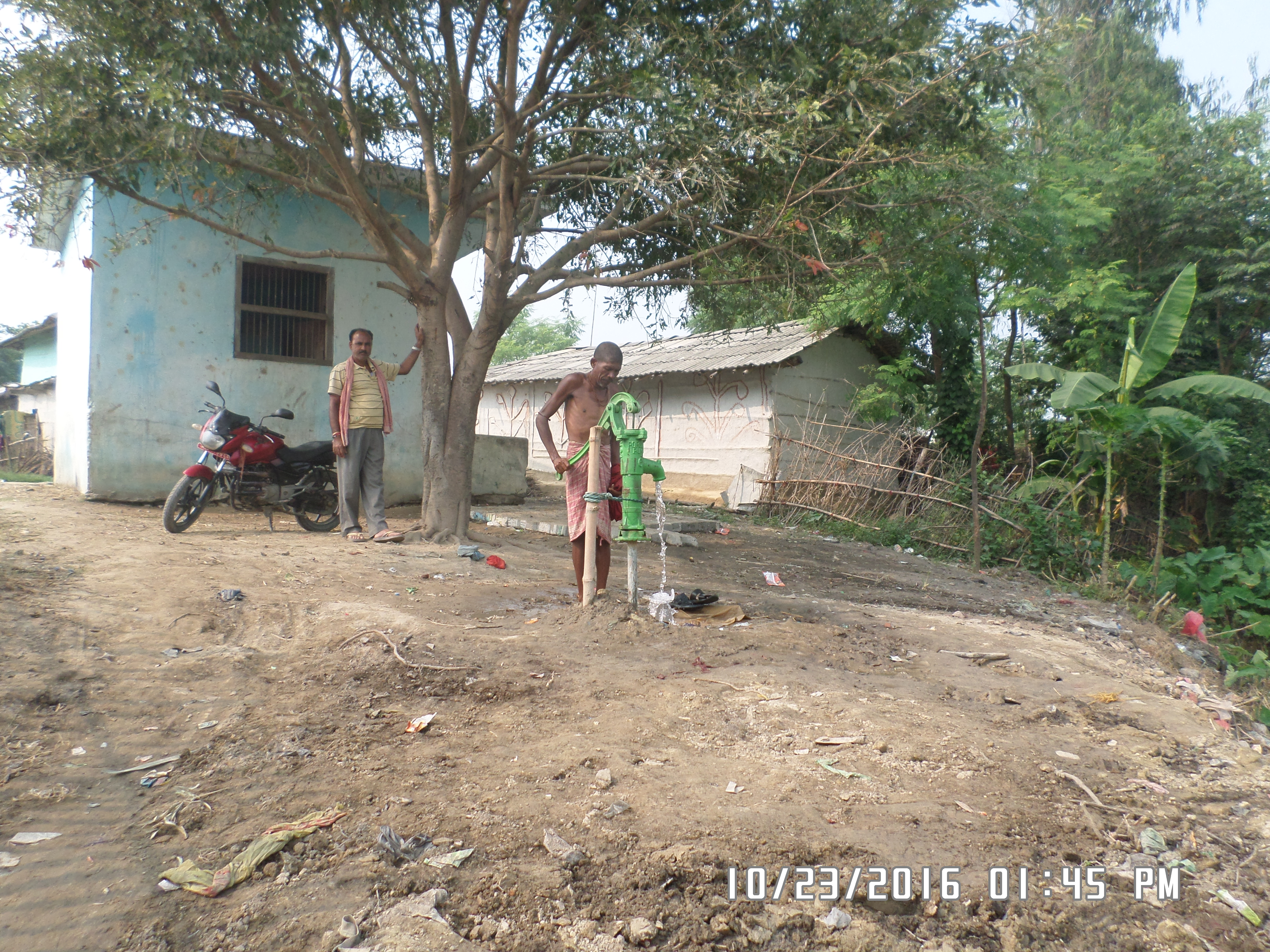
- People of Dhamaura

- Location in Nepal
- Coordinates: 26.79°N 85.83°E
- Country: Nepal
- Zone: Janakpur Zone
- District: Mahottari District

Population (1991)
  - Total: 9,221
- Time zone: UTC+5:45 (Nepal Time)

Dhamaura is a village in Mahottari District in the Janakpur Zone of south-eastern Nepal. It comes under Balawa Municipality At the time of the 1991 Nepal census it had a population of 9,221 people living in 1,712 individual households.

Dhamaura has a government school Dhamaura Higher Secondary School run by the Ministry of Education, Nepal. It was founded by Tej Narayan Singh.
