= Gosaikunda =

Lake in Nepal

- Nepali: गोसाइँकुण्ड, Nepali pronunciation: [ɡosãĩ̯kuɳɖʌ]
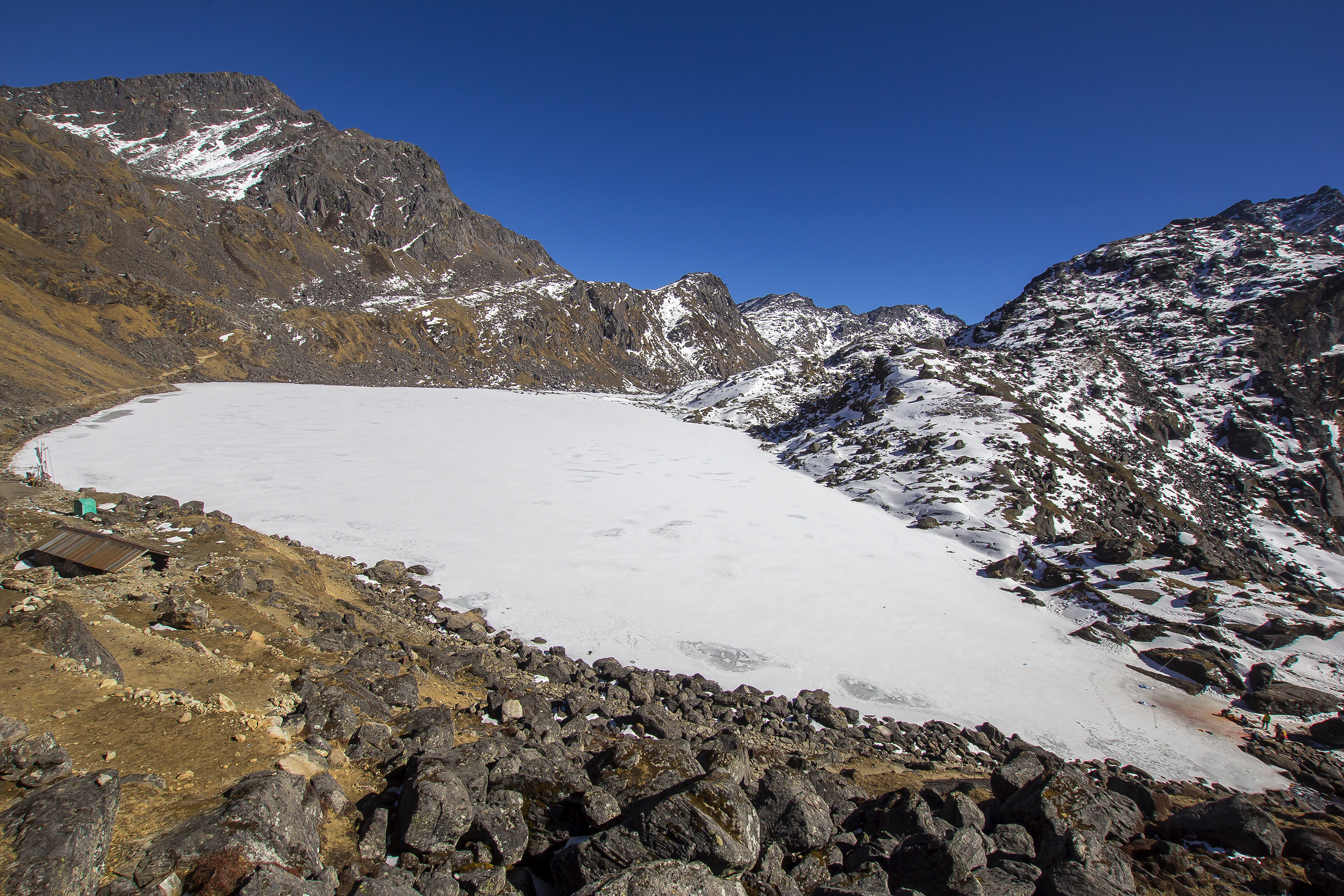
- Gosaikunda Lake in winter

- Location within Bagmati Province Location within Nepal Location within South Asia
- Interactive map of Gosaikunda
- Location: Rasuwa district
- Coordinates: 28°05′N 85°25′E
- Type: alpine, oligotrophic
- Primary inflows: 35 L/s (1.2 cu ft/s)
- Primary outflows: 60 L/s (2.1 cu ft/s)
- Basin countries: Nepal
- Surface area: 13.8 ha (34 acres)
- Water volume: 1,472,000 m^{3} (52,000,000 cu ft)
- Surface elevation: 4,380 m (14,370 ft)

Ramsar Wetland
- Official name: Gosaikunda and Associated Lakes
- Designated: 23 September 2007
- Reference no.: 1693

Gosaikunda, also spelled Gosainkunda, is a lake in Nepal's Langtang National Park, located at an elevation of 4,380 m (14,370 ft) in the Rasuwa District with a surface area of 13.8 ha (34 acres). Together with associated lakes, the Gosaikunda Lake complex is 1,030 ha (2,500 acres) in size and was designated a Ramsar site on 29 September 2007.

The lake melts to form the Trishuli River; it remains frozen for six months in the winter October to June. There are 108 lakes in the vicinity. The Lauribina La pass at an elevation of 4,610 m (15,120 ft) is on its outskirts.

== Religious significance ==
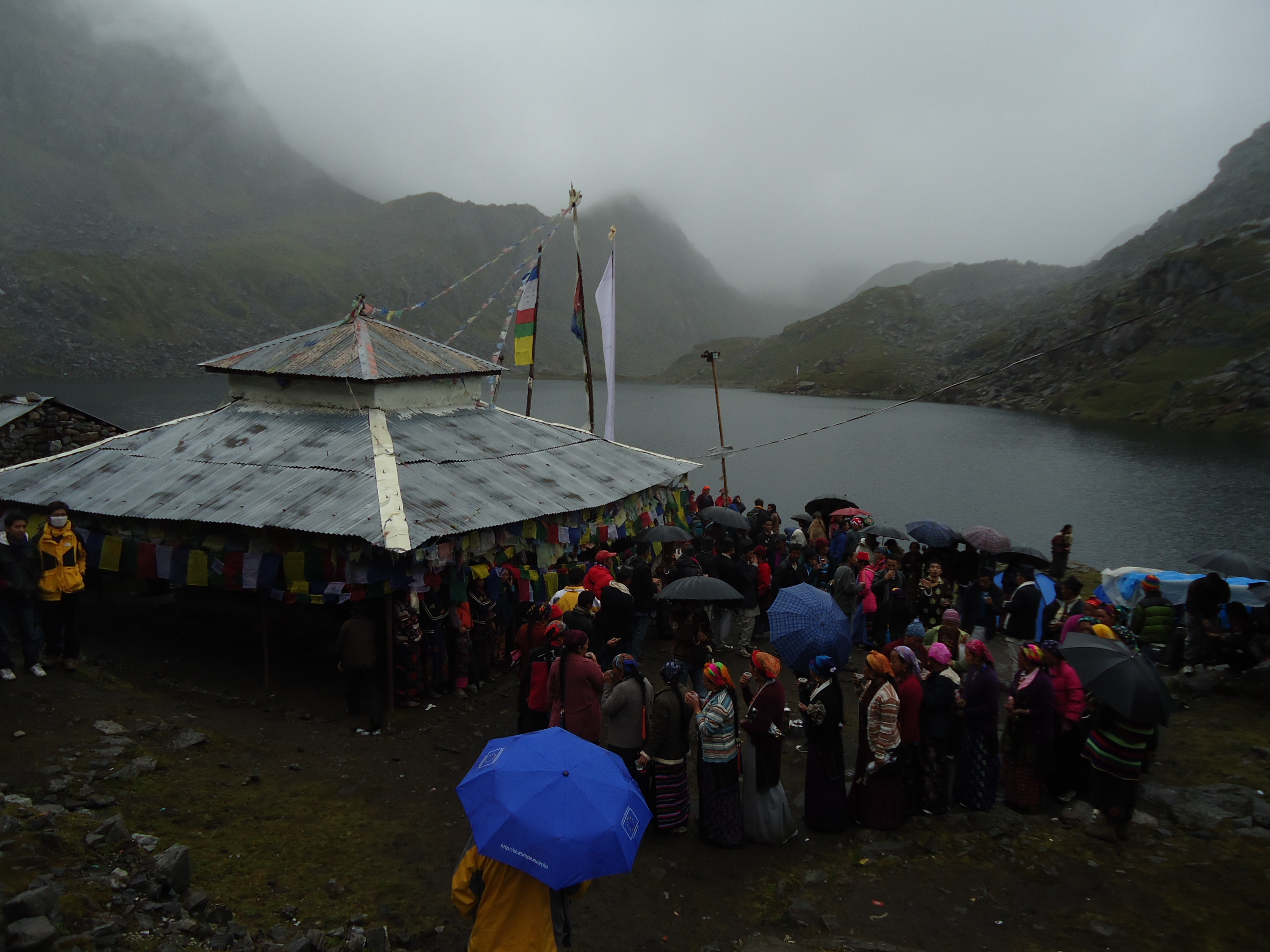
Shiva Temple at Gosaikunda

According to legend, the spring that feeds the pond in the Kumbheshwar temple complex in Patan is connected to Gosaikunda. Therefore, those who cannot make the long journey to the lake, visit Kumbeshwar Pokhari instead.

The “Samudra Manthana” or churning of the ocean is said to be the origin of the Gosaikunda lake. When Lord Shiva swallowed poison, he is said to have pierced his “trishul” to the ground to tap water to soothe his stinging throat. The Gosaikunda lake is said to have been created in this manner, and is revered by Hindus.

== In popular culture ==
Among the Newar people, Gosaikunda is known as Silu and the subject of the Silu song and a Silu film inspired by that song.
