= Ma Pani Doctor =

2013 Nepalese book

- Cover of Ma Pani Doctor
- Author: Om Murti Anil
- Language: Nepali
- Subject: Health and Awareness
- Genre: Non-fiction
- Publisher: Creative Planet
- Publication date: 2013
- Publication place: Nepal
- Media type: Print (Hardcover)
- Pages: 318
- ISBN: 9788192822808

Ma Pani Doctor (Nepali: म पनि डाक्टर) is a book authored by Om Murti Anil, a cardiologist from Nepal, which was published in 2013. The book aims to promote awareness of health and prevent heart disease. It provides guidance on preventing and managing diseases through lifestyle changes, diet, and health awareness. The book's title, "I am also a doctor," is roughly translated from the Nepali language.

The book was launched by the then President of Nepal, Dr. Ram Baran Yadav, on the eve of World Heart Day 2013. He also wrote its foreword, noting that the book might be useful in addressing the rising burden of non-communicable diseases in Nepal.

The author has distributed 5,000 free copies of the book to health workers with aim to improve the detection and primary care of heart disease at the community level. The book has been used as a reference by health workers and the general public.

== Background and Content ==
Dr. Om Murti Anil wrote Ma Pani Doctor in response to the growing burden of heart disease in Nepal. The book aims to educate the general public and health workers in simple Nepali language.

The book contains 30 chapters across 324 pages, covering a range of topics related to preventive health and common illnesses. The book mainly includes topics related to heart disease prevention, diabetes, hypertension, cholesterol management, smoking and alcohol risks, and the importance of diet and exercise.

It also covers medical emergencies, diagnostic procedures, and common medications, along with their side effects in simplified ways. It was later adapted into a 90-episode audiovisual series to reach wider audiences.

== Publication and Launch ==
Ma Pani Doctor was launched on the eve of World Heart Day 2013 by the then President of Nepal, Dr. Ram Baran Yadav, at an event held at the presidential residence, Sheetal Niwas.

As a physician himself, President Yadav acknowledged the book's potential in promoting heart disease prevention and contributed the foreword, noting the need for accessible health information to educate individuals in managing their well-being before illness manifests.

Ma Pani Doctor has been a reference and guide for health journalists and professionals in Nepal, and has contributed to raising cardiovascular health awareness for the prevention of heart disease in Nepal. This book is a good source of information on heart health in simple language, not just for the general public but also for health practitioners working in the field of public health in Nepal.
