= Silu (film) =

First film made in Nepal Bhasa

- Theatrical release poster
- Nepal Bhasa: सिलु
- Directed by: Pradeep Rimal
- Written by: Dev Bahadur Ranjit "Moti" and Prem Baniya
- Dialogues by: Pradeep Rimal
- Screenplay by: Pradip Rimal
- Produced by: Prem Baniya and Dan B. Maharjan
- Starring: Jay Shrestha; Nabina Shrestha; Madan Krishna Shrestha; Hari Bansha Acharya
- Cinematography: Murari Thakur
- Music by: Ganesh Prasad Shrestha
- Release date: November 1987 (Nepal)
- Country: Nepal
- Language: Nepal Bhasa
- Budget: NRs 1,361,000
- Box office: N/A

Silu (Nepali: सिलु) is the first film to be made in the Newar language. The movie depicts the pain of separation of a couple from Kathmandu after the wife gets kidnapped while on a pilgrimage in the Himalaya, and the sufferings her husband goes through to get her back from her captors.

The musical film is based on a ballad in Nepal Bhasa written in the early 19th century which describes a journey to Silu, the sacred lake known as Gosaikunda located in the Himalaya. There is a belief in Newar society that a husband and wife should not make the trip together as it could result in a misfortune.

== Plot ==
Tuyu Maicha (Naveena Shrestha) makes a race with her friends at Swayambhu stairs. Hira (Jaya Shrestha) joins them and declares himself first when they reach to the top. This first meet make Hira fall in love with Tuyu Maicha but the girl doesn't like him and goes her own way. Hira tells about her to his uncle, Aashnara (Madan Krishna Shrestha) who assures him that he'll take care of everything once Hira finds out her home.

Hira now starts following Tuyu Maicha. He finds her home, plays flute sitting in an inn in front of her house and also follows her to the stone spout. He sees an old man working in the girls house and approaches him with a proposal that he would provide him with clothes if he settles his matter with the girl. Turns out, the man working is actually the girl's father and he chases Hira away. Learning that the things have gone wrong, Hira asks for help with his uncle.

During Indra Jatra, everyone attends the ceremony with joy. Hira meets Tuyu Maicha and gives her a flower but she turns her back. Later, Aashnara meets the girl's father and talk about her marriage with his nephew. The father immediately rejects the proposal remembering the previous incident with Hira. One day, when Hira is playing flute in the inn as usual, the girl's father calls everyone and beats Hira and breaks his flute. Hira pours his anger to Tuyu Maicha and tells her that, if needed, he'll steal her and marry. His friends comforts him and tells him to try another girl, but he replies that he would not want any angels from heaven but just Tuyu Maicha.

One day, some street performer amuses people with a performing bear. Tuyu Maicha is there watching the performance. Seeing the red shawl of Tuyu Maicha, the bear chases her. She runs away in fear. Just when bear is about the attack her, Hira arrives. He fights the bear and chase it away. This incident makes the girl like him and they start a romantic relationship. The girl's father still won't agree for their marriage.

Hira gets to the inn in front of her house. From the window, Tuyu Maicha and her sister shows him a mirror. The sister pulls Tuyu Maicha's hair and tears the clothes on her back. Confused, Hira goes to his uncle and tells what happened. Uncle then tells him the symbolic meanings. Pulling hair means "come when it's dark" and tearing the back clothes means "come to the back of the house". Learning the message of the girl, Hira goes to meet her but during the daylight. Girl's father is working outdoor. Hira scares him away by acting a ghost in the straw-stack and then meets the girl.

Once again, the talk about marriage is brought up, but by the girl's mother. This time, father agrees and Tuyu Maicha marries Hira. A feast is arranged. Aashnara drinks up too much and gets fainted. He is then woken up by Harinara (Hari Bansha Acharya).

Some time after their marriage, Hira visits Kumbheshwar temple complex Kunti (Banglamukhi, Patan) with his friends. There he learns about the holy place, Silu (Gosainkunda), from where the water in Kunti is believed to be coming from. He and his friends decide to go on a pilgrimage to Silu. Someone suggests them that, husband and wife should consult an astrologer before going. Hira consults one, who says they should not go together. When the wife finds out about the plan, she insists on coming too. He reminds her of the tradition that it is not done, and that it could lead to their separation.

Hira starts his journey with his friends, leaving behind his beloved wife. After going some distance, they meet Tuyu Maicha, who has been following them. They ask her to return and continues their journey. Tuyu Maicha secretly follows them. Later, when they meet again, they couldn't convince her to go back and decides to take her.

Hira, with his wife and friends, reach Silu and they spend some time there. A bandit gets his eyes on the girl. On their return trip, they're surrounded. The bandits beat the boys and steals the girl. Hira's friend try to convince Hira that he should get back suggesting 'lost is dead', but Hira decides he would get back only with his wife and stays there watching his friends desert him. The girl is shown confined in a cage by the bandits.

Hira meets a Baba (a holy saint) who says he'll help him. Baba goes to see the girl with a flower from Hira. She gets some hope. The bandit later, asks her to marry him. She could not reject but she says she'll do it once her fast ends. Hira and Baba meets the bandit's daughter and tell her that they are merchants. She tells them that her father is getting married again. Hira then gives her a mirror and bangles asking her to hand it over to the bride as wedding gift. She takes those things and gives to Tuyu Maicha, who recognizing the symbolic conversation pull the daughter's hair. Hira learns about it and decides to go free her when it gets dark.

Hira and Baba frees Tuyu Maicha when all the bandits are enjoying the marriage ceremony. Later, when they find out the bride missing, they run after them trying to get the girl back. Hira and Baba fight the bandits and get away. Hira and Tuyu Maicha pleads Baba to come with them. But Baba decides he'll stay. Hira and Tuyu Maicha then gets on a boat and sail away.

== Cast ==
- Jay Shrestha as Hira
- Nabina Shrestha as Tuyu Maicha
- Madan Krishna Shrestha as Aashnara Mama
- Hari Bansha Acharya as Harinara Baidhya

== The song ==
The song "Silu" is one of the Newar seasonal songs and is played during August, when pilgrims usually visit Silu to take part in the ritual bathing festival that climaxes on the full moon. According to the song, when the husband and wife reach Silu, the king sends soldiers to take her away and makes her his queen. The depressed husband leaves home and becomes an ascetic. One day, the queen asks that all the ascetics be assembled to give them alms. She spots her husband among them, and slips away with him disguised as a nun.

== See also ==
- Gosaikunda
- Silu (song)
- List of Nepal Bhasa films
