= Maha Jodi =

Nepalese comedic duo

- मह जोडी
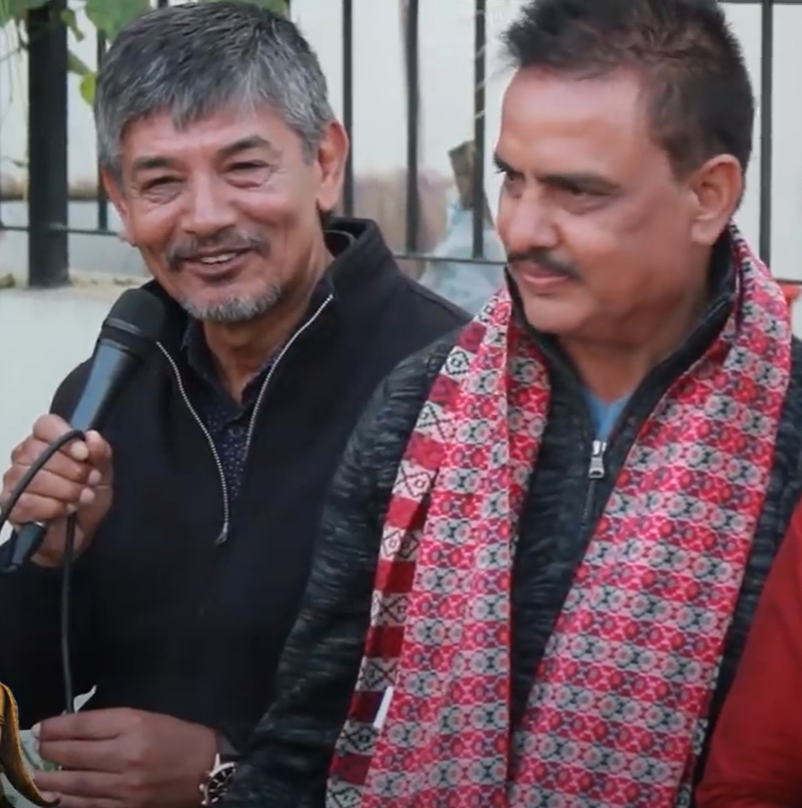
- Madan Krishna Shrestha (in left) and Hari Bansha Acharya
- Born: 19 April 1950 (age 76) (Madan Krishna Shrestha); 13 November 1957 (age 69) (Hari Bansha Acharya)
- Notable work: Laal Purja, 15 Gate, Madan Bahadur Hari Bahadur

Comedy career
- Years active: 1978-present
- Genres: Sitcom; drama

Maha Jodi (Nepali: मह जोडी) is the acronym of the comedy duo Madan Krishna Shrestha and Hari Bansha Acharya of Nepal in Devanagari script. The acronym was coined by another contemporary comedian, Rajaram Paudel. Maha Jodi is recognized for educating the public about social and political issues through its programs.

== Contributions ==
MaHa's style is focused on creating awareness through laughter. They have also been involved in creating social activities and political freedom movements. Their production includes 15 Gate, Gaunkhane Katha, Kantipur, ShurBeshur, Lobhi Papi, Dashain, Je Bho Ramrai Bho (2003), Balidan, SLC, 216777, Raat, 205, Chiranjibi, Jalpari, Oh:Ho, Madan Bahadur Hari Bahadur, Aama and many more.

They also showcase stage shows including their yearly Gaijatra shows, except for 2007 when they could not stage the show due to venue problems.

== Recognition ==
A species of groundhopper (Orthoptera: Tetrigidae) discovered from Shivapuri Nagarjun National Park by a team led by Nepali researcher Madan Subedi has been named after this iconic duo as Skejotettix mahajodi Subedi, Kasalo, & Skejo, 2024.
