= Hari Bansha Acharya =

Nepalese actor, comedian, singer, and writer

- हरिवंश आचार्य
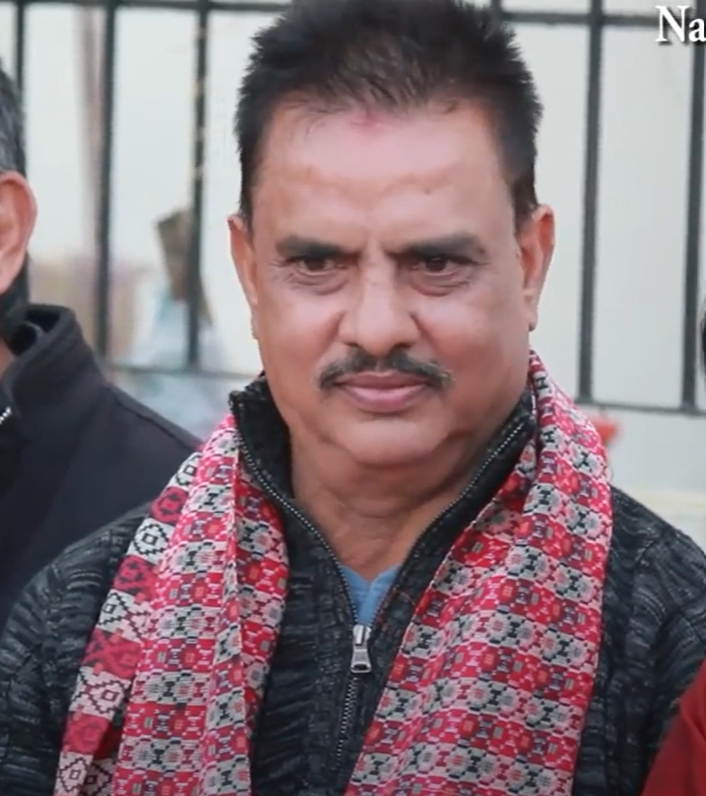
- Acharya in 2018
- Born: 13 November 1957 (age 68); Kathmandu, Nepal
- Other name: Hari Bahadur
- Citizenship: Nepalese
- Occupations: Actor, comedian, singer, writer
- Spouses: Meera Acharya (deceased); Ramila Pathak (current)

Hari Bansha Acharya (Nepali: हरिवंश आचार्य) is a Nepalese actor, comedian, director, singer and writer. Hari Bansha Acharya widely revered and regarded as the greatest comic comedian of all time in Nepalese Tele and movie industry, is known for Jeevan Sharma. He is one half of the comedy duo Maha Jodi along with fellow artist Madan Krishna Shrestha. He is also known for his portrayal of Arjun in the 1997 patriotic drama film Balidaan. His performance as “Hari Bahadur” in the television series "Madan Bahadur Hari Bahadur" is widely recognized. He also co-wrote and performed in the film Shatru Gate.

== Early life ==
Hari Bansha Acharya was born on 27 Kartik 2014 BS (13 November 1957 AD) in Gairidhara, Kathmandu, to father Homanjaya Acharya and mother Ganesh Kumari. He was named 'Hari Bansha' after the Hari Bansha Purana; his father had the purana recited before his birth in hopes of having a son.

== Personal life ==
Hari Bansha Acharya met his first wife, Meera, in 1982. He has two sons, Trilok Acharya and Mohit Acharya. His first wife, Meera Acharya, suffered from heart disease, and died in 2011. He married his second wife Ramila Pathak in 2012. In 2015, Acharya established The Meera Centre, named for his late wife. The centre provides health and educational services with the aim of contributing to the holistic development of children under five years.

== Career ==
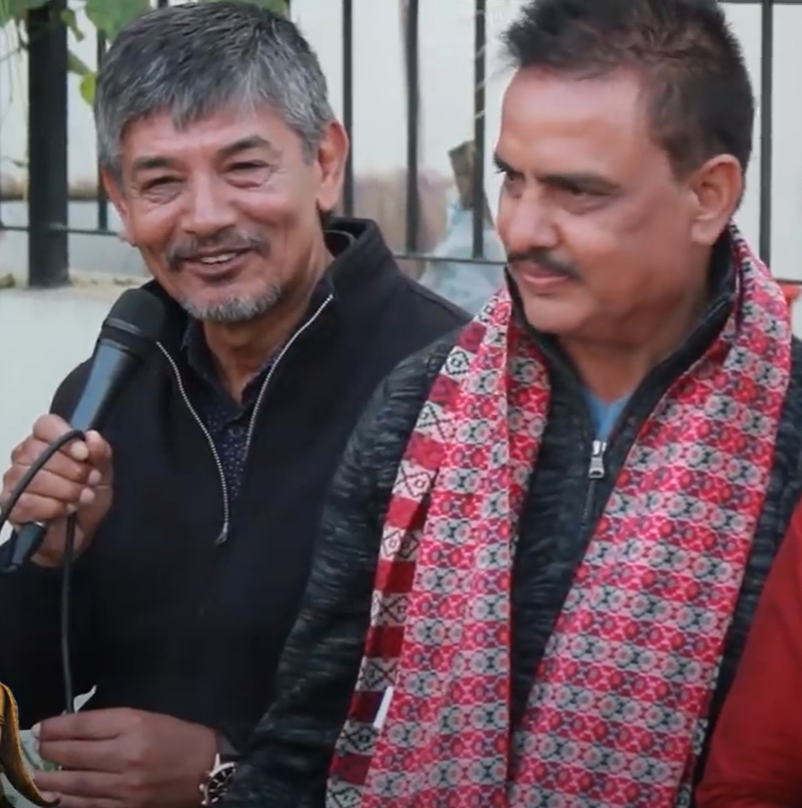
Hari Bansha Acharya (right) with Madan Krishna Shrestha (left).

Acharya performed with Hari Prasad Rimal and Jitendra Mahat Avilashi in 2031 BS (1974 AD) on Radio Nepal, then the only radio station in Nepal. In 2032 BS (1975 AD), he joined Rastriya Naach Ghar. He had participated in Gaijatra Mahotsav in 2034 BS (1977 AD). Before performing with Madan Krishna Shrestha and becoming a part of the MAHA Jodi, he worked in the entertainment field for almost six years.

Acharya has also played in films. Lovipapi, Filim, Rajamati, Silu, Balidaan, Je Bho Ramrai bho, and Tah ta Sarhai Bigris Ni Badri are some of his popular films that were immensely popular in the Nepali film industry. His performance in Balidaan is considered to be his one of the finest performance. Some of his remarkable comedy series like Lal Purja, Pandra Gatay, Bhakunde Bhoot, Series of Hari Bahadur and Madan Bahadur, 50/50, and Dashain ko Chyangra, will be cherished by Nepalese even after many years. After 17 years Acharya and Shrestha starred in 2074 multistarrer comedy-drama Satru Gate whose story was written by Acharya. The film became a commercial success and is one of the highest grossing Nepali film ever.

Acharya and his comedy duo are active in social life and were very much noted for their effort in the April Uprising in Nepal, which dethroned the monarchy. The duo was touted for the Presidency by some spheres of the Nepalese population.

== Filmography ==
=== Films ===
Key
†	Denotes films that have not yet been released

- All films are in Nepali language or else noted

Year	Title	Role	Notes	Ref(s)
1984	Basudev	Kamal (Role no. 101)		
1987	Silu		Nepal Bhasa film (Note: Nepal's first film to be released in NEPAL BHASA)	
1990	Lovi paapi			
1995	Rajamati		Nepal Bhasa film	
1997	Balidaan	Arjun	Banned by Former King Gyanendra in 2005 (Note: Based on the democracy movement in Nepal during the monarchy)	
2000	Tan Ta Sarai Bigris Ni Badri	Badri		
2003	Je Bho Ramrai Bho		Director	
2016	Hasi Deu Ek Phera	Hari		
2018	Shatru Gate			
2019	Dal Bhat Tarkari			
2022	Mahapurush			
2024	Mahajatra			
2025	Hari Bahadur Ko Jutta			
2025	Bhuthan			

=== Television programs ===
Program(s)	Role	Notes	Ref.
50-50	Hari Bansa	produced for NTV	
Santati Ko Lagi	Inspector	produced for Reukai	
216777	Ghost	produced for NTV	
Bhakunde Bhoot		produced for NTV	
Pandhra Gate	Baikuntha	produced for NTV	
Dashain	Bhairey	produced for NTV	
Chiranjibi	Chiranjibi	produced for JICA	
Raat	Major Kanchha	produced for UNDP	
Banpale	Sadhuram Sukumbasi	produced for King Mahendra Trust for Nature Conservation	
Sur Besur	Sur	produced for MaHa Sanchar	
Ohho!	Pandit	produced for BBC and HMG/Nepal	
Kantipur	Ward Chairman	produced for Kathmandu Metropolitan City	
Rajmarg	Chyau Kanchha	produced for Community Health Program	
Paani Paani		produced for Nepal Jaycees	
Wrong Number			
Kalazar	Harbanslal	produced for CECI	
Ashal Logne	Birkhey	produced for NFHP	
Laxmi	Dayaram Sharma	produced for Nepal Rastra Bank	
Bigyapan	Sri Kalabar Dev Ghai		
Laal Purja	Dhurbaram Pandit	produced for MaHa Sanchar	
Bose Aandrei Bhudiko	Bose Aandrei Bhudiko		
Tike ko Tin Mantra	Tikey	about condom	
Shristi	Dhan Prasad	produced for Plan Nepal	
Jalpareee	Jharana Bahadur	produced for ENFO	
Virus	Gokul Prasad Kadai	produced for FNCCI	
Gold Medal	Harbansh Kawadi		
Daanbir	Punya Prasad		
MaHa Chautari	various roles	about different conflicts of Nepal	
Left Right Left	Ram Singh	produced for FHI	
Madan Bahadur Hari Bahadur	Hari Bahadur	program on informing people about the Constitutional Assembly produced by Maha Sanchar	

=== Theater programs ===
Year	Title	Role	Notes	Ref.
	Yamlok			
	Paralysis			
	Anshabandha			
	Cockfight			
	Raddi Tokari			
	Sapath Grahan			
	Aina			
	London Airport			
	Woda Number 34			
	Rastriya Gaun Khane Katha Pratiyogita			
	Picnic			
	Abhibhawak			
	Sangeet			
	Remote Control			
	Nepal Bandha			
	Prasna Uttar			
	Dohori Geet			
	Geetai Geet			
	Kaukuti			
	Nata			
	205			
	Hoste Hainse			
	Saalik (The Statue)		2000	
	MaHa Dohari		2003	
	Dwitiya Raastriya Gaaun Khaane Pratiyogita		2004	
	Abhinandan			
	Sharaddhye			
	MaHa Dohari – 2			
	Kisi Nyaimha Madanman			
	Bahun Bahadur, Newar Bahadur	Newar Bahadur		

== Radio programs ==
- Vitamin A Program
- Girls Education – GTZ
- Leprosy – BBC
- Chhu Mantar – BBS
- Mechi Mahakali Express – BBC
- Rukh Baaje Suga Nati – UNICEF
- MaHa Adalat / MaHa Chautari (in coordination with Antenna Nepal)

== Music ==
Songs

- Khokro Sarangi
- Barabar Timro Mero Maya Barabar
- Chanchale Chanchale
- Hamri Aama
- Jhyaun Jhyaun Jhyaukiri
- Khanna Ma Ta Arkako Jutho
- Mayalu Nahos Hajur Risani
- Sajha Busma
- Sarangi Retaula
- Budo Huna Man Chaina
- Karkalo Kokyaula (कर्कलो कोक्याउला)
- Kauli (काउली)

Hari Bansha Acharya (album)

- Barabar
- Chanchale
- Jyaun Jyaun
- Hamri Aama
- Hey Rama Rama
- Jo Jeevan Ko
- Kina Mero Naam
- Ma Timro Jeevan Ko
- Note Note

== Publications ==
- Gold Medal — published by Kathmandu Publication
- Mahasan — published by Sajha Prakashan
- Neparujinno Kurasito Seuji (Social and Political Life of Nepal)
- China Harayeko Manchhe (autobiography)
- Hari Bahadur (novel)

== Positions held ==
- Ambassador, UN World Food Program Nepal
- Chairman, Kathmandu Animal Treatment Centre
- Founder, Jana Andolan Health Relief Fund (established during 2nd People's Movement in 2062–2063 BS)
- Executive Director, MaHa Sanchar, Kathmandu
- Vice President, Kathmandu Model Hospital (PHECT)
- Honorary Life Member, Nepal Association of Victoria Sydney, Australia (20 June 1998)
- Honorary Member, Nepal Film Artist National Association
- Founder board member, Tilganga Eye Centre, Kathmandu
- board member, Spinal Injury Organisation, Kathmandu
- board member, Campion Associates, Kathmandu
- Member, Rotary Club of Tripureshwor, Kathmandu
- Member, Nepal Russia Friendship Society, Kathmandu
- Member, Nepal Music Association, Kathmandu

== Awards and honours ==
- NEFTA awards
- OFA awards
- Honoured in Hasya Byangya Hijo Aaja Bholi 2070
- Jagadamba Shree Puraskar
