= Madan Krishna Shrestha =

Nepali actor, comedian, singer, writer

- मदन कृष्ण श्रेष्ठ
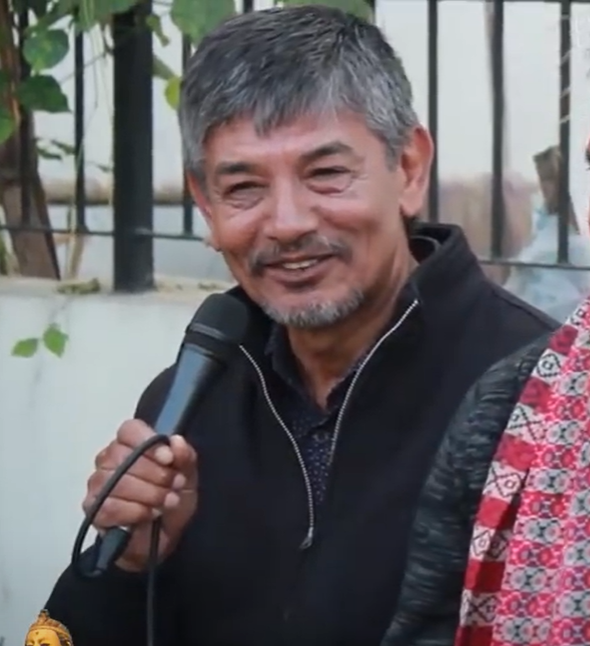
- Shrestha in 2017
- Born: 19 April 1950 (age 76); Jitpurphedi, Kathmandu, Kingdom of Nepal
- Other name: Madan Bahadur
- Education: Mahendra Ratna Campus
- Occupations: Comedian, writer
- Known for: Maha Jodi
- Spouse: Yashoda Subedi Shrestha (m. 1974; died 2018)
- Children: Yaman Shrestha (son); Sarana Shrestha (daughter)
- Parents: Ram Krishna Lal Shrestha (father); Laxmi Devi Shrestha (mother)
- Awards: Jagadamba Shree Puraskar

Madan Krishna Shrestha (Nepali: मदन कृष्ण श्रेष्ठ;) is a Nepalese actor, comedian, writer, singer, composer, director and producer. He is one of the most successful and respected figures in the Nepali entertainment industry and was among the most popular stage performers of his time. He is known for his method acting and is one half of the comedy duo Maha Jodi, alongside Hari Bansha Acharya. He frequently performs on stage with his long-time partner, Hari Bansha Acharya.

== Early life and career ==
Madan Krishna Shrestha was born and raised in Nepal. He developed a passion for the arts at an early age, and his career has spanned various domains, including acting, directing, and music. His ability to blend comedy with emotional depth has made him a unique and beloved figure in Nepali entertainment.

== MaHa Jodi ==
Shrestha's most significant contribution to Nepali comedy comes through his partnership with Hari Bansha Acharya in the MaHa Jodi. The duo is famous for their collaborative performances, which combine humor, satire, and sharp social commentary. Their live performances, television appearances, and theatrical shows have earned them immense popularity in Nepal. The MaHa Jodi's work has become a cornerstone of Nepali comedy, and their influence continues to be felt in the country's entertainment scene.

== Method acting and versatility ==
Madan Krishna Shrestha’s journey into the world of entertainment began in the early 1970s. Shrestha is particularly known for his method acting, where he immerses himself deeply into his characters to deliver authentic and compelling performances. His acting style is praised for its emotional nuance, blending humor with moments of serious drama. Shrestha's versatility has allowed him to perform in a wide range of genres, from comedy to serious roles, making him one of the most respected actors in the Nepali entertainment industry.

== Autobiography ==
His autobiography titled, "MaHa ko Ma" was launched in 2017. In this book, he reflects on his life, career, and the journey he shared with Hari Bansha Acharya. The autobiography offers insight into the personal and professional experiences of one of Nepal's most iconic comedy figures, recounting his struggles, successes, and the evolution of the MaHa Jodi.

== Legacy and influence ==
Madan Krishna Shrestha is notable for contributions to comedy, theater, and film. He inspired countless aspiring artists. He still continues to influence the comedic and theatrical traditions of his country.

Shrestha's work, both in front of the camera and on stage, continues to endear him to fans, securing his place as a legend in the Nepali entertainment world.

== Filmography ==
=== As an actor ===
Year	Title	Role	Notes	Ref.
	Film			
1984	Basudev	Madan sir		
1987	Silu			
1990	Lovi Paapi			
1995	Rajamati			
	Ke Ghar Ke Deraa			
	Mala			
	Truck Driver			
1997	Balidaan	Retired Captain		
2003	Je Bho Ramrai Bho			
	Sukha Dukha			
	Chandalika			
2016	Hasi Deu Ek Phera			
2018	Shatru Gate			
2019	Dal Bhat Tarkari			
2022	Mahapurush			
2025	Paran			
2026	Pahad			
2026	Paraan			
2026	Gauthali			

=== Television programs ===
Program(s)	Role	Notes	Ref.
50-50	Custom officer	produced for NTV	
216777	Narayan baajey	produced for NTV	
Pandhra Gatey	Nilkantha Nepali	produced for NTV	
Santati Ko Lagi	Daanbir saau	produced for Reukai	
Dashain	Haakim saab	produced for NTV	
Chiranjibi	Saaila	produced for JICA	
Banpale	Forester Himmatraj/Father	produced for King Mahendra Trust for Nature Conservation	
Sur Besur	Ustadji	produced for MaHa Sanchar	
Ohho!	Chitrakar	produced for BBC and HMG/Nepal	
Kantipur	Yamaraj	produced for Kathmandu Metropolitan City	
Rajmarg	Dr. Mistri Madan Lal	produced for Community Health Program	
Wrong Number			
Ashal Logne	Bhakta baa	produced for NFHP	
Kalazar	Nasib Lal	produced for CECI	
Jalpari	Kumari	produced for ENFO	
Raat	Dr. Basanta	produced for UNDP	
Laxmi	Luchhe Ratna Shakya	produced for Nepal Rastra Bank	
Laal Purja	Ghanashyam Adhikari	produced for MaHa Sanchar	
Tike ko Tin Mantra	Sukuraman	about condom	
Shristi	Hridaya Ram	produced for Plan Nepal	
Virus	Kumar saau	produced for FNCCI	
Gold Medal	Brikh Bahadur		
Daanbir	Dhan Bahadur		
MaHa Chautari	Jethaa baa	about different conflicts of Nepal	
Left Right Left	Haldaar baa	produced for FHI	
Madan Bahadur Hari Bahadur	Madan Bahadur	program on informing people about the Constitutional Assembly produced by Maha Sanchar	

== Images ==
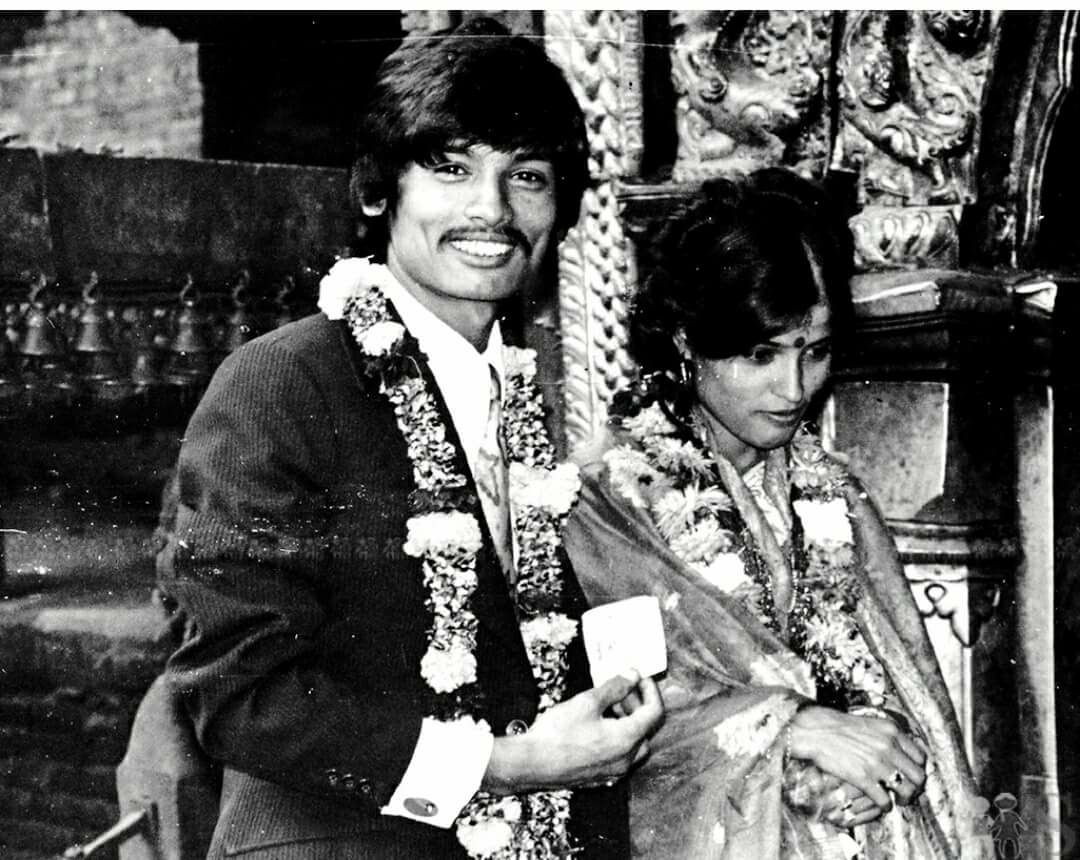
Shrestha with his wife Yashoda Subedi at their wedding (in 1974)

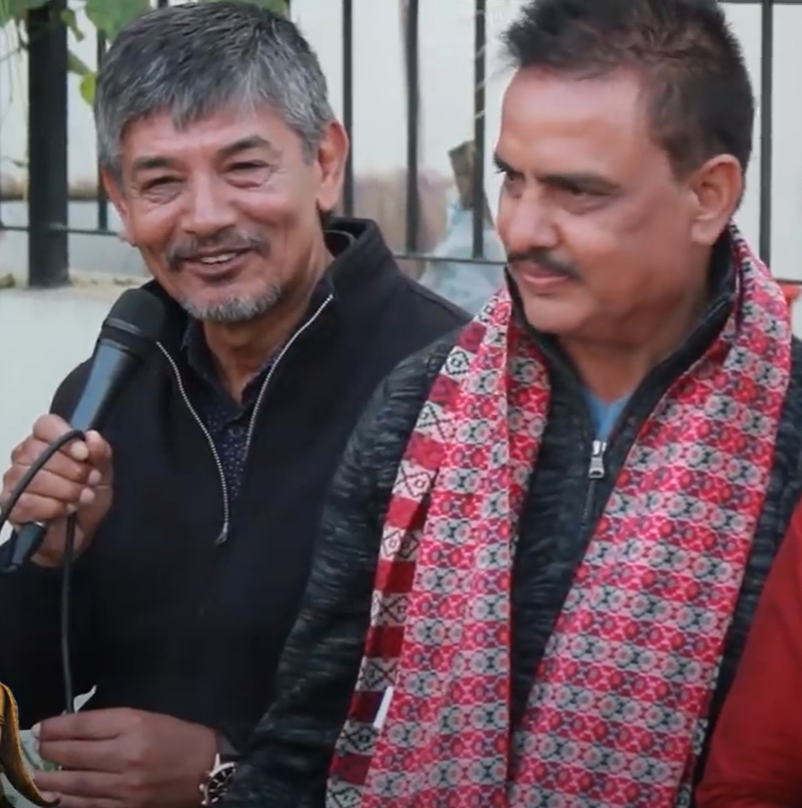
Shrestha with Hari Bansha Acharya
