= Dinesh Subba =

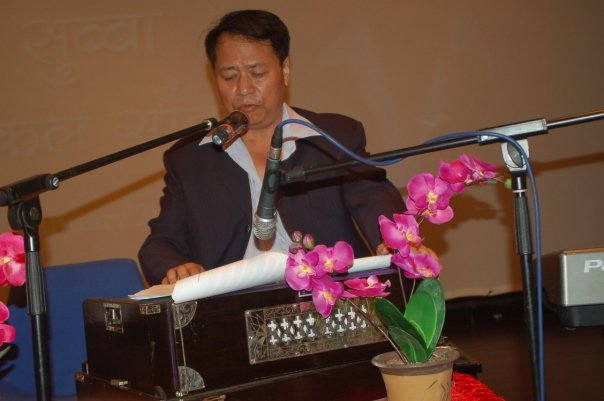
- Born: 1962; Darjeeling, India
- Education: Graduation/Bachelor's Degree in Music
- Occupations: Composer, singer, lyricist
- Spouse: Anita Gurung
- Children: Nishad Subba, Nitant Subba
- Website: www.dineshsubba.com

Dinesh Subba (Limbu) (Nepali: दिनेश सुब्बा) is a composer, singer and lyricist of Nepali music.

== Biography ==
Subba was born in 1962 in Tumsong Tea Garden, Darjeeling. In 1982, he moved to Kathmandu to pursue a career in music and become a singer . He passed Radio Nepal's voice test in the same batch as Shambhu Rai, Thule Rai and Nishan Bhattarai.He later worked in the music department of the Royal Nepal Academy for a decade.

From 1996, he lived in Hong Kong with his family where he actively promoted Nepalese music and culture. He worked as a music teacher in several schools and also ran his own music academy and recording studio as well. In addition, he supported the Nepalese communities by connecting and promoting artistic talents between Nepal, Hong Kong and Darjeeling.A documentary film In the Canvas of Air (2009) based on his life directed by Rabin Rai was released in his honor. The income generated from the documentary was donated to Gyan Chakshyu Blind School in Dharan, Hong Kong. In 2014, the Himalayan Tones Music Academy operated by him made a history by successfully organizing the Amber Gurung Nite in Hong kong.In 2023 he and his family moved to the United Kingdom.

== Music career ==
His songs Thaha Napai Maya Mero (Nepali: "थाह नपाई माया मेरो"), Maile Rojeko Phul (Nepali: "मैले रोजेको फूल") and Dherai Dekhe Sapani Ma (Nepali: "धेरै देखे सपनीमा", music by Mansing Thulung and lyrics by Chhetra Pratap) were hugely popular across the country. He guided Ram Krishna Dhakal from an early age, and Dhakal’s first recorded song, Hamro Sundar Sansar (Nepali: "हाम्रो सुन्दर संसार"), was composed by Subba. Another popular singer, Yam Baral, made his mark with Subba's very popular composition Badalu ko Ghumto le (Nepali: "बादलुको घुम्टोले").His composition"Timi herchhau bhane" sung by Arun Thapa became another hit. He made numerous songs with other well-known singers like Deep Shrestha, Arun Thapa, Pawan Golay, Meera Rana, Prakash Shrestha, Sunita Subba, Sukmit Gurung, Pabitra Subba, Ushakiran Adhikari, Lochan Bhattarai, Kuber Rai, Uday-Manila Sotang, Rajesh Payal, Banika Pradhan, Anupama Pradhan, Gyan Subba and Satya/Swarup Acharya. In 2014, the Himalaya Tones Music Academy operated by him made a history by successfully organizing the Amber Gurung Nite in Hong kong.

== Influences ==
Dinesh Subba has a wide range of musical influences, including Ambar Gurung, Gopal Yonzon, Shanti Thatal, Narayan Gopal, Deep Shrestha ,Aruna Lama, Karma Yonzon, Kumar Subba, Prem Dhoj Pradhan, Bhakta Raj acharya and others. He was deeply shaped by the musical and literary ambience of Darjeeling. Winning the Gorkha Dukha Niwaran and Devkota Sangit in Darjeeling, where he received the honors from music maestro Shanti Thatal, inspired Subba to seriously pursue his career in music.

== Awards ==
1. Winner in Gorkha Dhukha Niwarak Sammelan Darjeeling Singing Competition in 1982
2. 1st Runner up in Devkota Folk Music held by G.D.N.F.Darjeeling in 1982
3. Winner in Radio Nepal's Singing competition on 37th anniversary
4. Winner in Patriotic song competition held on the 40th birthday of Queen Aishwarya
5. Winner as Music Composer in Radio Nepal's song competition in 1995
6. Hong Kong Nepalese Award by Hong Kong Nepalese Federation in 2009
7. Felicitated by Jhataro Hong Kong, Gorkha United Community of India Hong Kong
8. Felicitated by Kalanidhi Indira Sangeet Mahavidyalaya, Kirat Yaktung Chumlung, Nepal in 2013
9. Hero Hits F.M music award 2075 in best composition (modern song)

== Albums ==
1. Nishad by Music Nepal
2. Mahobhav with lyricist Tanka Sambahamphe
3. Unison
4. Ama ki Nani, A children song album
5. Samjhauta with Lyricist BN Chamling
6. Voice of Hong Kong, compilation of 21 songs from 21 individual singers in Hong Kong
7. Nitant
8. Mutuka Pratidhuani-1 (Resonance of Hearts)
9. Mutuka Pratidhuani-2(all vocals by Pawan Golay)

== Bibliography ==
1.Mero Bhagyamaani Baja (collection of different music aspects)
2.Publication of Children magazine "The Ping" for the 3rd edition in Hong Kong.
