= Badalindo Aakash (The Changing Sky) =

Badlido Aakash
- बदलिँदो आकाश
- Directed by: Laxminath Sharma
- Written by: Bijaya Bahadur Malla
- Screenplay by: Laxminath Sharma
- Produced by: Royal Nepal Film Corporation
- Starring: Shiva Shrestha; Sushma Shahi; Harihar Sharma; Subhadra Adhikari; Nir Shah; Tika Pahari; Santosh Panta
- Cinematography: Shyam Mohan Shrestha
- Edited by: Madhukar Basnet
- Music by: Gopal Yonjan; Nagendra Thapa
- Release date: 1983
- Country: Nepal
- Language: Nepali

Badlido Aakash (The Changing Sky) is a 1983 Nepali social drama film directed by Laxminath Sharma and produced by the state-owned Royal Nepal Film Corporation (RNFC). Written by the prominent Nepali literary figure Bijaya Bahadur Malla, the film stars an ensemble cast including Shiva Shrestha, Sushma Shahi, Harihar Sharma, Subhadra Adhikari, Neer Shah, Tika Pahari, and Santosh Panta.

Released on November 8, 1983, the film is regarded as a hallmark project of the "Golden Era" of Nepalese cinema (1981–1990). It explored the generational fractures and shifting moral paradigms in a rapidly urbanizing Nepali society. The film is particularly remembered for its critically acclaimed soundtrack composed by Gopal Yonjan.

== Plot ==
The narrative focuses on a principled family patriarch (played by Harihar Sharma) who struggles to preserve traditional familial structures and values against the pressures of modernization, financial hardship, and shifting youth aspirations. His children, influenced by contemporary urban lifestyles, drift away emotionally and geographically, leading to systemic domestic conflict. The titular "changing sky" serves as an overarching metaphor for the volatile, unavoidable societal changes sweeping through contemporary Kathmandu, culminating in an emotional exploration of estrangement and eventual reconciliation.

== Cast ==
- Shiva Shrestha
- Sushma Shahi
- Harihar Sharma
- Subhadra Adhikari
- Nir Shah
- Tika Pahari
- Santosh Panta

== Production ==
Following the domestic success of early RNFC features like Maiti Ghar (1966) and Kumari (1977), Badlido Aakash was conceived to elevate the artistic and technical standards of indigenous Nepali filmmaking. Principal photography was handled by veteran cinematographer Shyam Mohan Shrestha on location across the Kathmandu Valley. The editing was completed by Madhukar Basnet.

== Music ==
The musical score and songs were composed by the legendary musician Gopal Yonjan with lyrics written by Nagendra Thapa. The playback singing featured iconic figures of the era, including "Swor Samrat" Narayan Gopal, Kumar Basnet, Prakash Shrestha, and Sukmit Gurung.

A traditional Deusi festival track recorded for the movie remains a culturally significant composition widely played throughout Nepal during the Tihar festival.
