= Hari Bhakta Katuwal =

Indian-Nepali poet (1935–1980)

- हरिभक्त कटुवाल
- Born: Hum Bahadur Katuwal; 2 July 1935; Bogibeel, Dibrugarh, Assam
- Died: 10 September 1980 (aged 45); Dibrugarh, Assam
- Other names: Prabasi
- Education: B.A
- Occupations: Poet, songwriter
- Notable work: Yo Jindagi Khai ke Jindagi
- Parents: Bir Bahadur Katuwal (father); Bishnu Maya Katuwal (mother)
- Awards: Royal Nepal Academy Medal

Hari Bhakta Katuwal (Nepali: हरिभक्त कटुवाल) was an Indian-Nepali poet, writer and songwriter.

== Biography ==
Hari Bhakta Katuwal was born on 2 July 1935 in Dibrugarh, Assam. In India, he used to write poems under the name Prabasi (transl. Non-resident). He moved to Kathmandu to pursue his writing career after being invited by King Mahendra.

Noted for his writing style, he published many poems including Bhitri Manche Bolna Khojch, Yo Zindagi Khai Ke Zindagi, and Samjhana.

He also wrote lyrics that have been sung by noted and veteran Nepali singers Narayan Gopal, Amber Gurung, and Aruna Lama.

Katuwal died on 10 September 1980 in Assam. He was cremated at the banks of the Brahmaputra River in a Hindu ceremony.

In 2015, documentary Ani Hari Bhakta Farkiyenan about Katuwal's life was released. In 2017, a play was staged at the Sarwanam Theatre based on his poems for his 82nd birth anniversary. In 2021, a life-size statue of Katuwal was erected at Jaigaon near the Indo-Bhutan border.

== Notable works ==
- Samjhana (collection of songs)
- Bhitri Manchhe Bolna Khojchha
- Sudha (short-epic)
- Purba Kiran (collection of poems)
- Yo Jindagi Khai ke Jindagi (collection of poems)
- Badanam Mera Yi Aankhaharoo (collection of songs and poems)
- Aitihasik Kathasangraha (in collaboration with other writers)
- Spastikaran
- Ma Mareko Chhaina (play)

== See also ==
- Lil Bahadur Chettri
- Peter J. Karthak
- Indra Bahadur Rai
