= Kanchhi =

- Directed by: B.S. Thapa
- Produced by: Om Productions Pvt. Ltd. (Bhagawan Das Shrestha)
- Starring: Sharmila Malla; Shiv Shrestha; Sushila Rayamajhi
- Cinematography: Ramchandra
- Music by: Gopal Yonzon
- Release date: 1984
- Country: Nepal
- Language: Nepali

Kanchhi (Nepali: कान्छी) is a 1984 Nepali film directed by B.S. Thapa and produced by Bhagawan Das Shrestha. The film was a major hit in Nepal.

The 1984 release, Nepali movie ‘Kanchhi’ was one of the very successful movies at that time. The movie featured actors like Shiva Shrestha, Sharmila Malla (debut), Sushma Shahi, and Mausami Malla (debut) in leading roles.

== Cast and crew ==
Movie: KANCHHI

Banner: Om Production Pvt. Ltd.

Music: Gopal Yonjan

Lyrics: Gopal Yonjan Kanchhi

Cast: Shiva Shrestha, Sharmila Shah (now Sharmila Malla), Sushma Shahi, Shanti Maskey, Murali Dhar, Sushila Raimajhi, Sagar Thapa, Shaarada Basnet, Riddi Charan Shrestha, Ananda Thapa, Pragya Ratna Bajracharya, Baal Kumari, B.S Thapa, Gautam Tuladhar, Gopal Bhutani

Background Score: Manohari Singh

Playback Singer: Narayan Gopal, Aruna Lama, Gopal Yonjan, Prasad Shrestha, Prakash Shrestha, Sukhmit Adhikari, Bimala Rai

Dialogue: Chetan Karki Dance

Direction: Basanta Rayamajhi

Editing: K. Nanda

Camera: Ramchandra

Music: Gopal Yonjan

Producer: Bhagawan Shrestha

Co-Producer: Tirthalal Pradhan

Story/Script/Direction: B.S. Thapa

Audio Video by Budhasubba Music Centre.

Equipments: Royal Nepal Film Academy, Kathmandu

Lights: Ghan Shyam Daiwagya

Song Recording: Vibration Studio(Culcutta)

Sound Recording: Bombay Sound Service

Makeup: Dilip Kamble

Wardrobe: Baal Kumari Tailors

== Soundtrack ==
| No. | Title | Singer(s) | Length |
|---|---|---|---|
| 1. | "Kanchhi He Kanchhi" | Prakash Shrestha, Bimala Rai | 5:12 |
| 2. | "Kala Kala Sala Sala" | Aruna Lama, Ram Prasad Shrestha | 5:52 |
| 3. | "Himal Sari" | Narayan Gopal, Aruna Lama | 5:16 |
| 4. | "Yee Timra Muskan" | Aruna Lama | 4:40 |
| 5. | "Chhori ko janma" | Narayan Gopal |
| Total length: | | | 20:20 |

The music of the film was composed by Gopal Yonzon.

== Production ==
B.S. Thapa was the director, story writer and dialogue writer of the film. The film shooting took place in Pokhara, Nepal and in India.
