= Shanti Thatal =

Indian music composer and singer

- Born: 4 April 1938 (age 88); Darjeeling, Bengal Presidency, British India (present-day West Bengal, India)
- Education: Rabindra Bharati University
- Occupations: Musician, composer, singer
- Awards: Jagadamba Shree Puraskar

Shanti Thatal is an Indian music composer and singer, known for her works in Nepali film industry. She has more than 200 songs to her credit, including music for several Nepali films. She is the first female music composer of the Nepali film industry.

== Personal life ==
Thatal was born on 4 April 1938 in Darjeeling, Bengal Presidency, British India (now West Bengal, India) to father Manu Singh Thatal and mother Chandra Maya Thatal. She initially learned music under the mentorship of Shiva Prasad Singh and Bhanu Ghosh. She did her schooling at St. Teresa School, Darjeeling and went on to complete her bachelor's degree in music. Later she moved to Calcutta to learn music at Rabindra Bharati University. After returning to Darjeeling, she joined the Himalaya Kala Mandir, a music, arts and drama institute in Darjeeling, and also learnt music from Amber Gurung. The legendary Nepali singer Aruna Lama was her best friend. She considered Gopal Yonzon and Karma Yonzon as her favourite musicians.

She also started teaching music at Kendriya Vidhyalaya. After her education, she moved to Gangtok, Sikkim to join a government job. She became a Director at the Culture Department of the Sikkim government. Music remained her passion. Shanti Thatal never married. She now lives her retired life in Darjeeling.

== Music ==
Initially, Shanti was a singer. She composed the playback music for Ishwor Ballav's musical play (gitikatha) called Yeuta Nilo Suryasta, after which she gained fame as a music composer. She went on to score music for the Nepali films Paral Ko Aago (1978) and Bachana Chahane Haru (1982). Some of her well-known songs are Mayalu Ley Samjhe Ki Kaso, Udi Jaun Bhaney Mo Panchi Hoina, Dherai Chubul Nagara, Samhalera Rakha, and Chaubandi Ko Toonama.

== Awards ==
She was awarded the Master Mitra Sen Smriti Award for Music in 2002 by the Sikkim government. She was felicitated with Jagadamba Shree Puraskar in 2020 for her contribution to Nepali music.

== See also ==
- Amber Gurung
- Aruna Lama
- Gopal Yonzon
