= Adhunik Geet =

Genre of Nepali music

Adhunik Geet or Adhuneek Geet (Nepali: आधुनिक गीत), meaning "modern song", is a genre of Nepali music, which emerged in the 1950s and derives its influence from folk, classical, western music and Ghazals. Musicians such as Master Ratna Das Prakash, Amber Gurung, Nati Kaji drew together the core elements of this often sentimental genre.

After the Rana regime was overpowered and restored to King Tribhuban in 1951, the banning of mass media by the Ranas was reversed. With this came the influence of other musical genres and film songs from India (Bollywood) to Nepal. The state-sponsored Radio Nepal was founded in April 1951 and radio became the prime vehicle for promotion of music. The government actively promoted Nepali as the national language and in 1961 Ratna Recording Trust began to produce phonographic records of Nepali Adhunik Geet. Radio Nepal and Ratna Recording Trust circulated Nepali popular music to advance the sense of Nepali nationalism. Adhunik Geet became Nepal's popular music and remains so today. Although it is listened by all, the primary audience is the older, educated, urban dweller.

== See also ==
- Narayan Gopal
- Aruna Lama
- Music of Nepal
