= Bindabasini Music Awards =

Nepalese annual music awards

- Awarded for: Excellence in Nepali music
- Country: Nepal
- First award: 2010
- Website: bindabasinimusic.com

The Bindabasini Music Awards are annual music awards given at a ceremony hosted by Nepalese record label Bindabasini Music. Established in 2010, these awards honor Nepal's singers, musicians, songwriters, actors, and directors each year.

== History ==
The inaugural Bindabasini Music Awards were held in Kathmandu in December 2010. The first ceremony presented awards in 27 categories and honored veteran singer Bhakta Raj Acharya with the Lifetime Achievement Award. The second edition took place in December 2011 at the Army Officers' Club in Kathmandu.

By its fifth edition in 2014, the awards had 31 categories. The tenth edition was held in 2020, where singer Kumar Basnet was honored with Lifetime Achievement Award. The eleventh edition was held in 2021 at Hotel Yak and Yeti in Kathmandu. The ceremony honored singer Yogesh Vaidya with the Lifetime Achievement Award and singer Kunti Moktan with the Sangeet Sadhana Award, while presenting awards in more than 20 categories.

The fourteenth edition was held in 2024, the award had 31 categories where Meera Rana received Lifetime Achievement Award.

The fifteenth edition, held in April 2025, presented awards in 17 categories together with five honorary recognitions and featured musical performances by Nepali artists.

== Notable recipients ==
Lifetime Achievement Award recipients have included:

- Bhakta Raj Acharya (2010)
- Prem Dhoj Pradhan (2015)
- Ratna Shamsher Thapa (2017)
- Yogesh Vaidya (2021)
- Rajendra Thapa (2025)

== See also ==
- Tuborg Image Awards — Nepalese music awards
- Music of Nepal
- Lok Dohori
