= Dibya Khaling =

Nepalese musician (1952–2006)

- दिव्य खालिङ
- Born: 28 March 1952; Darjeeling, India
- Died: 25 June 2006 (aged 54); Siliguri, India
- Occupations: Musician, composer and lyricist
- Spouse: Grace Khaling
- Children: 4
- Parents: Samson Khaling (father); Martha Khaling (mother)

Dibya Khaling (Nepali: दिब्य खालिङ; 28 March 1952 - 25 June 2006) was an Indian musician, composer and lyricist known for his works in the Nepali language. He had worked with many prominent Nepali singers such as Arun Thapa and Narayan Gopal.

== Early life ==
He was born on 28 March 1952 (15 Jestha 2009 BS) in Darjeeling Mission Compound in Darjeeling, India to father Samson Khaling and mother Martha Khaling. In childhood, he used to suffer from polio. His father bought him a harmonium to keep him occupied and he started singing in church programmes since the age of 12. He received a bachelor's degree at the age of 21.

== Music ==
Khaling has rendered music for about 1000 songs, including the famous Mero Geet Sabai Timi Laai.. sung by Arun Thapa, Ma Ta Laligurans Bhayechhu, Hey Bir Hinda Aghi Sari, Preyasika Yaadharu, Mayako Aadharma, and Bipana Babhaye Bachidine, and music for plays and films (Nepali film Didi by Pratap Subba). Khaling moved to Nepal from Darjeeling in the 1960s and worked with Radio Nepal. He composed music for singers like Narayan Gopal, Arun Thapa, Gyanu Rana, Mira Rana etc.

A book Dibya Sangeetkaar, Dibya Khaaling was written by his friends and family members, such as poet Madhav Prasad Ghimire and musicians Kiran Pradhan and Bulu Mukarung in his memory.

== Personal life ==
He was married to Grace Khaling. He was suffering from heart problems and died on 25 June 2006. He is survived by three sons (Prajaya, Pradesh, Pratibimba), one daughter (Pratigya), three granddaughters (Divyanah Grace, Aanyata Parisa and Amanda Enid) and two grandsons (Noah and Deedan Daniel).

== See also ==
- Narayan Gopal
- Aruna Lama
- Gopal Yonzon
