= Chandra Kumar Rasaili =

Nepalese musician

Chandra Kumar Rasaili (Nepali: चन्द्र कुमार रसाइली), more popularly known as CK Rasaili(Nepali: सिके रसाइली), is a Nepalese musician contemporary to Narayan Gopal and Gopal Yonjan.

== Biography ==
Rasaili was born in Baluchistan region of Pakistan when his father was a soldier in the British Army. He has seven siblings. He studied up to high school from Meghalaya, India. There he played for orchestra. In 2020BS, he and his team came to Nepal to celebrate the birthday of King Mahendra and performed at Rastriya Nach Ghar. King liked his performance. King Mahendra also gave him a song to compose a music. The song was later recorded in Calcutta. He worked in Radio Nepal. He also composed for Nepal police and Nepal army.

== Awards ==
- Narayan Gopal Memorial Award 2017
- Natikaji National Music Award
