= Music award =

Award given for an accomplishment in the field of music

A music award is an award or prize given to honour skill or distinction in music. There are different awards in different countries, and awards may focus on or exclude certain music; for example, some awards are only for classical music and not focused on popular music. Some awards are academic, while others are commercial and created by the music industry.

== Major music awards ==
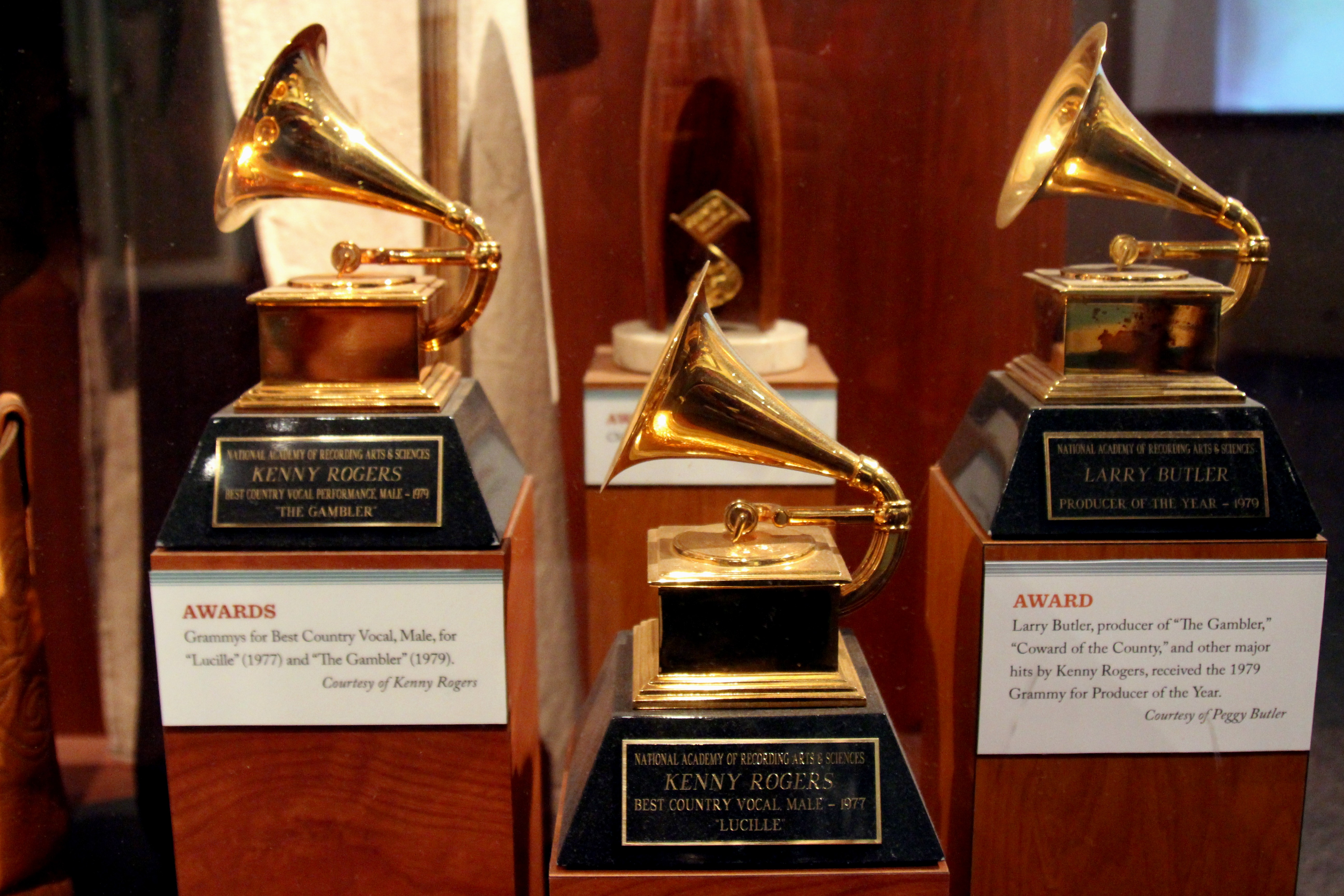
Grammy Awards trophies on display at the Country Music Hall of Fame and Museum

- Grammy Awards
- Brit Awards
- ARIA Music Awards
- Juno Awards
- Aotearoa Music Awards
- MTV Video Music Awards
- American Music Awards
- Billboard Music Awards
- Latin Grammy Awards
- Brazilian Music Awards
- MTV Europe Music Awards
- iHeartRadio Music Awards
- World Music Awards
- BET Awards
- People's Choice Awards
- Mercury Prize
- Korean Music Awards
- Golden Disc Awards
- Golden Melody Awards
- Gaon Chart Music Awards
- Teen Choice Awards
- NME Awards
- MAMA Awards
- Melon Music Awards
- NRJ Music Awards
- Latin American Music Awards
- Billboard Latin Music Awards
- Multishow Brazilian Music Award
- Lo Nuestro Awards
- MOBO Awards
- Japan Record Awards
- Seoul Music Awards
- Heat Latin Music Awards
- Spellemannprisen
- Polar Music Prize
- Grammis
- Nordic Council Music Prize
- Los 40 Music Awards
- Music Awards Japan
- Nickelodeon Kids' Choice Awards

== Minor music awards ==
- English American Music Awards
- British Canadian Music Awards
- VH1 Video Music Awards
- British American Music Awards
- Canadian American Music Awards
- VH1 Europe Music Awards
- English Music Awards
- WET Awards
- English Canadian Music Awards

== International music awards ==
- Classic Rock Roll of Honour Awards – an annual awards program bestowed by Classic Rock
- Ernst von Siemens Music Prize
- Llangollen International Musical Eisteddfod
- Grammy Awards
- Grawemeyer Award for Music Composition
- Heavy Music Awards
- Herbert von Karajan Music Prize (Festspielhaus Baden-Baden)
- Léonie Sonning Music Prize (Léonie Sonning Music Foundation)
- MTV Video Music Awards (MTV)
- Polar Music Prize – for International recognition of excellence in the world of music
- Rolf Schock Prize in Musical Arts
- Sibelius Prize
- Winter Music Conference (electronic dance music)
- YouTube Music Awards
- Global Music Awards

== Awards by region ==
=== Africa ===
- MTV Africa Music Awards (MTV)
- All Africa Music Awards (African Union)
- The Headies (Nigeria)
- Soundcity MVP Awards Festival (Nigeria)
- City People Entertainment Awards (Nigeria)
- Nigeria Entertainment Awards (Nigeria)
- Vodafone Ghana Music Awards (Ghana)
- 3Music Awards (Ghana)
- South African Hip Hop Awards (South Africa)
- South African Music Awards (South Africa)
- Star FM Music Awards (Zimbabwe)

=== Americas ===
In American pop culture major music awards given each season are the Rock and Roll Hall of Fame Induction Ceremony, held in the Fall (which currently honors artists who have been in the business at least 25 years since their first hit record), the American Music Awards (currently held in Spring), the Grammy Award (held in the Winter), and the Billboard Music Awards (currently held in late Fall), the MTV Video Music Awards (held in late Summer), the Glenn Gould Prize, and Pulitzer Prize for Music.

- Academy of Country Music Awards
- Alternative Press Music Awards
- American Academy of Arts and Letters Gold Medal in Music
- American Country Awards
- American Country Countdown Awards
- American Music Awards
- ASCAP awards (American Society of Composers, Authors and Publishers)
- Americana Music Honors & Awards
- BET Awards (Black Entertainment Television, United States)
- Billboard Music Awards
- Billboard Latin Music Awards
- Blues Music Awards
- Bolivia Music Awards (2021—2024; Bolivia)
- Boston Music Awards
- Brazilian Music Awards (Brazil)
- Canadian Independent Music Awards
- CMT Music Awards (USA)
- Country Music Association Awards
- Distinguished Service to Music Medal (Kappa Kappa Psi) – for exceptional service to American bands and band music
- GAMIQ Awards (Quebec)
- George Peabody Medal (Peabody Institute)
- Gershwin Prize (Library of Congress)
- GLAAD Media Award (USA)
- Grammy Awards (National Academy of Recording Arts and Sciences)
- Heat Latin Music Awards
- Hollywood Independent Music Awards
- Hollywood Music in Media Awards
- iBest Award (Brazil)
- iHeartRadio Music Awards
- iHeartRadio MMVAs (originally an initialism of Much Music Video Awards)
- International Bluegrass Music Awards
- Josie Music Awards
- Juno Awards (Canadian Academy of Recording Arts and Sciences)
- K-Love Fan Awards (USA)
- Latin American Music Award
- Latin Grammy Award (Latin Academy of Recording Arts & Sciences)
- Latin Awards Canada
- Libera Awards
- Lo Nuestro Awards (USA)
- Los Premios MTV Latinoamérica – previously known as "MTV Video Music Awards Latinoamérica" (MTV)
- MTV Video Music Awards (MTV)
- MVPA Awards
- Multishow Brazilian Music Award (Brazil)
- NAACP Image Awards (United States)
- New Music Awards
- People's Choice Awards
- Premios Gardel (Argentina)
- Premios Juventud
- Premios MUSA (Chile)
- Premios Tu Música Urbano
- Pulitzer Prize for Music
- Rock and Roll Hall of Fame Induction Ceremony
- SESAC
- Stellar Awards (Gospel)
- Soul Train Music Award
- Teen Choice Awards
- Telehit Awards (Mexico)

=== Asia & Oceania ===
- ACUM Awards (Israel)
- Anugerah Musik Indonesia
- Anugerah Planet Muzik (Indonesia, Malaysia)
- Anugerah Industri Muzik (Recording Industry Association of Malaysia)
- Aotearoa Music Awards (Recorded Music NZ)
- ARIA Music Awards (Australian Recording Industry Association)
- Armenian Music Awards (Armenia)
- APRA Awards (Australia)
- APRA Silver Scroll Awards (New Zealand)
- Awit Awards (Philippine Association of the Record Industry)
- Bindabasini Music Awards (Nepal)
- Channel i Music Awards (Bangladesh)
- Country Music Awards of Australia (Country Music Association of Australia)
- Dedication Music Award (Vietnam)
- Filipino Music Awards (Philippines)
- Gaon Chart Music Awards (South Korea)
- Golden Disc Awards (South Korea)
- Golden Melody Awards (Taiwan)
- Indonesian Choice Awards
- Indonesian Dangdut Awards
- Japan Record Awards
- Korean Hip-hop Awards (South Korea)
- Korean Music Awards (South Korea)
- Korean Popular Culture and Arts Awards (South Korea)
- MBC Plus X Genie Music Awards (South Korea)
- Melon Music Awards (South Korea)
- MG Music Awards (Nagaland, India)
- Mirchi Music Awards (India)
- Sur Jyotsna National Music Awards (India)
- MAMA Awards (South Korea)
- MTV Asia Awards (MTV)
- MTV Australia Awards (MTV)
- MTV Video Music Awards Japan (MTV)
- Music Awards of Nagaland (Nagaland, India)
- Myx Music Awards (Philippines)
- Otaka Prize (Japan)
- Praemium Imperiale (Japan)
- Rolling Stone Australia Awards
- Seoul Music Awards (South Korea)
- Soribada Best K-Music Awards (South Korea)
- Suntory Music Award (Japan)
- Taite Music Prize (New Zealand)
- Tuborg Image Awards (Image Channel, Nepal)

=== Europe ===
- Akil Koci Prize (Albania)
- Amadeus Austrian Music Awards
- Anděl Awards (Czech Academy of Popular Music, Czechia)
- Arion Music Awards (2002—2011; IFPI Greece, Greece)
- Balkan Music Awards (2010—2012; Balkanika TV, Balkans)
- BBC Music Awards (BBC Music, United Kingdom)
- BBC Radio Scotland Young Traditional Musician (Scotland)
- BBC Radio 2 Folk Awards (United Kingdom)
- BBC Radio 2 Young Folk Award (United Kingdom)
- Bourges International Electro-Acoustic Music Competition
- BAFTA Anthony Asquith Award (British Academy of Film and Television Arts)
- Brit Awards (British Phonographic Industry)
- Comet (Viva, Germany)
- Danish Music Awards
- Echo (German Phonographic Academy)
- Edison Award (NVPI)
- Fryderyk (Poland)
- Fonogram Awards (Hungary)
- Gold Badge Awards – for outstanding contributions to the music and the entertainment industry of the United Kingdom
- Golden Globes (Portugal)
- Grand Prix du Disque (France)
- Handel Prize (City of Halle, Germany)
- Indexi Awards (2002—2011; Bosnia and Herzegovina) formerly Davorin Awards
- Ivor Novello Awards (British Academy of Songwriters, Composers and Authors)
- LOS40 Music Awards (Spain)
- MAD Video Music Awards (Greece)
- Malta Music Awards (Malta)
- MG Alba Scots Trad Music Awards (Scotland)
- Mercury Prize (United Kingdom)
- MOBO Awards (United Kingdom)
- Moldova Music Awards (2019; Moldova)
- Montefon Awards (Montenegro)
- MTV Europe Music Awards (MTV, Europe)
- Music Awards Ceremony (2019—2023; West Balkans)
- Music Moves Europe Award (Europe)
- NRJ Music Awards (France)
- NME Awards
- Nordic Council Music Prize (Nordic Council) – for outstanding contributions to the music of the Nordic countries.
- PLAY - Portuguese Music Awards (Portugal)
- Preis der deutschen Schallplattenkritik – for achievement in recorded music
- Premios Juventud
- Prix de Rome
- Romanian Music Awards (2008—2022; Music Channel, Romania) formerly MTV Romania Music Awards (2002—2007)
- Sanremo Music Festival (Italy)
- SEAT Music Awards (Italy)
- Silver Clef Award (UK)
- Spellemannprisen (Norway) – considered as the Norwegian Grammys that honor Norwegian artists who have made a mark in the Norway music industry.
- UK Music Video Awards
- Victoires de la Musique (France)
- YUNA (Ukraine)

== See also ==
- Lists of awards
- List of music awards honoring women
- Music recording certification
- List of writing awards § Songwriting awards
