= Krishna Malla =

Nepali film actor, producer, and director

- कृष्ण मल्ल
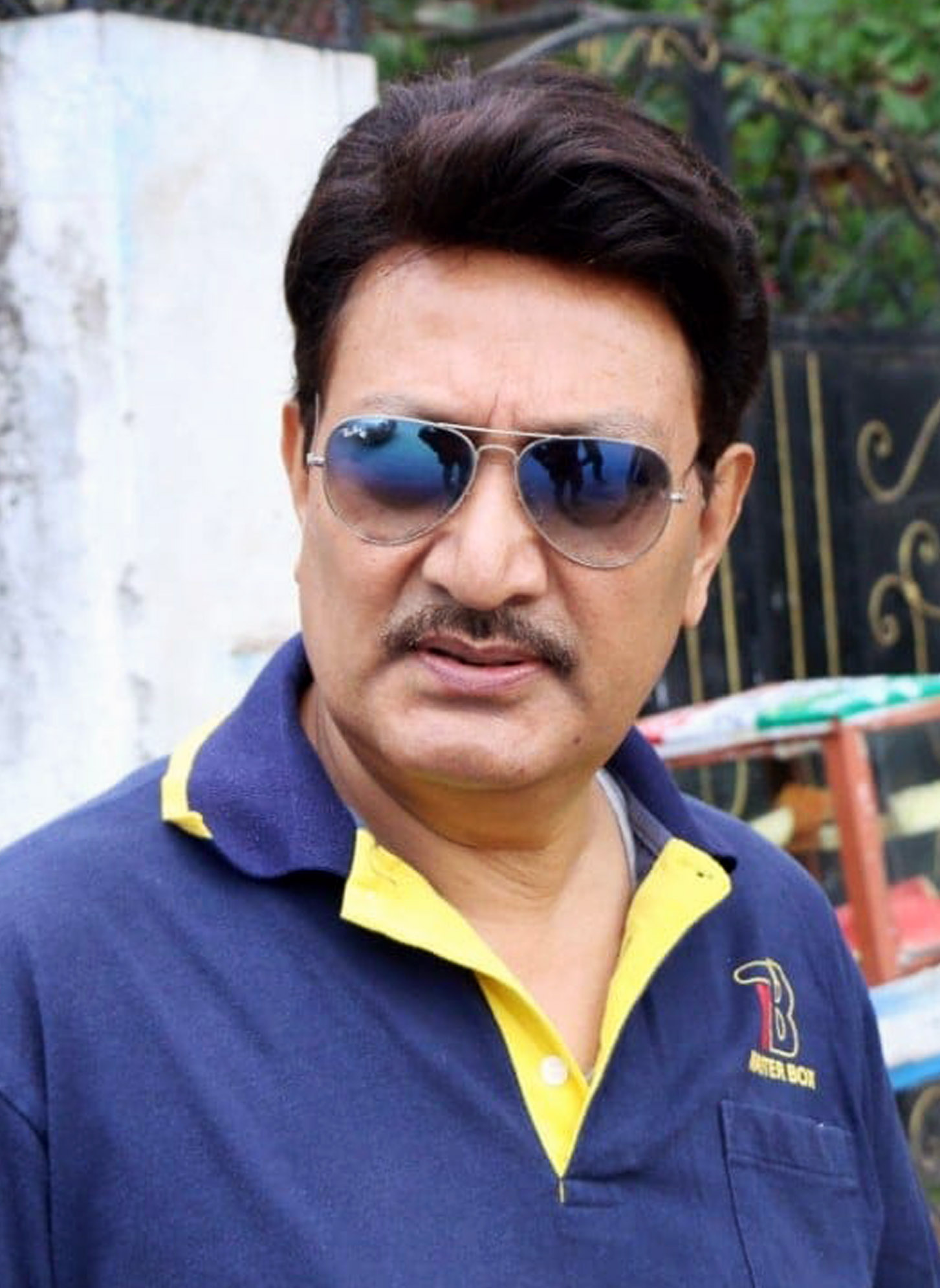
- Born: Krishna Kumar Malla; 1 September; Sindhupalchok, Kodari, Nepal
- Other name: Kris
- Education: Bachelor of Arts (Tri – Chandra College)
- Occupations: Actor, director, producer, writer
- Years active: 1976–present
- Height: 5 ft 8 in (173 cm)c
- Office: Chairman of Nepal Film Society
- Spouse: Sharmila Malla
- Honors: Prabal Gorkha Dakshinbahu; Gold Medal,(National Drama Festival); Best Director for Telefilm

Krishna Malla (Nepali: कृष्ण मल्ल) is a Nepalese film actor, film producer and film director. He is known for Gaajal (2001), Gothalo (1996) and Basudev (1984). His first theater act was Pahad Chichyairahecha.

== Biography ==
1. Royal Nepal Academy 1976–1978 (Sr. Actor – Drama)
2. National Theatre 1979–1980
3. Shree Samuha 1980 onward.
4. Radio Play – Radio Nepal 1978–1982
5. Nepal T.V 1984 (Sr. Producer/Director)
6. Produced and Directed 1st NTV Telefilm "Prithivi Narayan Shah" 1985.
7. Produced/Directed and acted 1st NTV serial, many other Nepali serials
8. Documentary on Indo-Nepal Relation 1987
9. Many TV Commercials.
10. Produced Filmcity (on NTV)
11. Film Artists Association of Nepal 1989 (-Gen Secy)
12. Shree Samuha (Artists Group) 1980(-Gen Secy)
13. Abhiyan (Soc. org run by Cine artists) 1984
14. Abhiyan (social & cultural organization)- Chairperson
15. Cine concern( Film prod. House)- Chairperson
16. Executive chairman:Film Development Board(Nepal Govt.)
17. Chairman:Film Artistes Association of Nepal(imm.past chairman)
18. Chairperson : National Film Co-ordination Supreme Com.
19. Chairperson : ASA (Project against HIV/AIDS)
20. Co-ordinator : Nationwide Dohori Geet Competition (1998)
21. President : National Film Artists Association Welfare Com (1998)
22. Chairman : 'Visit Nepal 98' Cultural Committee.
23. Chairman :New year festival 2062
24. Vice-President : Nepal Motion Picture Association Producer Com (1997–98)
25. Member : Cine artists relief com. for flood victims (1996)
26. Member : Chautara Alumni Association.
27. Member : Rotary Club of Bagmati.
28. Member : Cine Concern Entertainment Inc( Denver, USA).
29. Advisor : International Association of Educators for World Peace. (IAEWP Nepal)
30. Advisor : Synergy saving & credit cooperative ltd
31. Advisor : Nepal auction service p.ltd

== Film ==
Year	Film	Role	Ref
1984	Basudev		
1989	Maya Priti		
1991	Chino		
1991	Bijaya Parajaya		
1993	Koseli		
1993	Sankalpa		
1994	Sapana		
1994	Baadal	As Actor, Director, producer	
1995	Raanko		
1996	Gothalo	As Producer	
1996	Gazal		
2001	Lagangatho	As Producer	
2002	Anjuli		
2002	Hero		
2002	Yastai Hunchaa Pirati		

== Television ==
Year	Title	Role
	Astitwabo	
	Bastiharu Chharapasta Chhan	
	Nirnaya	
	Haribaje	
	Badri Master	
	Bhanjyang Ko Chautaro	
1985	Prithivi Narayan Shah	
1986	Chakrabyu	
1988	Tada ko Basti	
1986	Marshal	
1998	Adhyaro Ujyalo	

== Awards ==
Year	Award
2005	Prabal Gorkha Dakshinbahu
1974	HM's Coronation Medal
1976	Best Actor, GAA one act play
1978	Gold Medal, National Drama Festival
1987	Best Director for Telefilm
1996	Actor of Decade
1997	HM's accession to Throne Silver Jubilee Medal
2002	Birendra Aishwarya Sew Padak
	Award for special contribution by Nepal Film Artists National Association.
2001	Special trophy & Award for special contribution on Nepalese Films Industry by Nepal Motion Picture Association
	Award National Cultural Academy

== Social media ==
- Facebook
