= Subhadra Adhikari =

Nepalese actress

- सुभद्रा अधिकारी
- Born: 9 June 1959; Asan, Kathmandu, Nepal
- Died: 17 August 2019 (aged 60)
- Occupation: Actress

Subhadra Adhikari (Nepali: सुभद्रा अधिकारी, 9 June 1959 - 17 August 2019) was a Nepalese actress of film, stage and television. She was also a singer. In a career spanning six decades, she acted in more than a hundred feature films, and dozens of stage plays and television soap operas. Her debut film was Manko Bandh. Other notable films include Chino, Kanyadan, Basudev, Basanti, Muna Madan, Swarga, Saubhagya and Bato Muniko Phool, among others.

She was awarded the Chalachitra Dhirgha Sadhana Samman (with cash prize Rs 351,111) by President Bidya Devi Bhandari for her work in film.
