= Basudev =

1984 Nepali film by Neer Shah

- Directed by: Neer Shah
- Based on: Kattel Sarko Chotpatak by Dhruba Chandra Gautam
- Produced by: Binod Chaudhary
- Starring: Harihar Sharma; Shakuntala Sharma; Neer Shah; Subhadra Adhikari
- Release date: 27 December 1984 (Nepal)
- Country: Nepal
- Language: Nepali

Basudev is a 1984 Nepali language film, adapted from Dhruba Chandra Gautam's Kattel Sarko Chotpatak by Neer Shah in his directorial debut. The film starred Harihar Sharma as the eponymous character, with Shakuntala Sharma, Subhadra Adhikari, Krishna Malla, Sharmila Malla and director Shah himself in supporting roles, while Madan Krishna Shrestha and Hari Bansha Acharya were credited as guest actors. While the film was a critical and commercial success, it was criticised by some for its departure from the source material; Dhruba Chandra Gautam expressed disappointment at the film for being markedly different from the script he had written for the film. Neer Shah has conceded that various artistic compromises were made for commercial reasons which he came to regret later on. He is said to be actively planning a remake.

The film was produced by industrialist Binod Chaudhary. The film's musical score was composed by veteran musician Ranjit Gazmer. It was the debut film of comedian and actor Rajaram Paudel. The song Yatri from the film, adapted from the eponymous poem by Nepali poet Laxmi Prasad Devkota, was highly acclaimed upon its release and remains popular.

== Plot ==
Basudev Kattel (Harihar Sharma) is a professor in Kathmandu struggling to make ends meet. When his friend Kumar (Neer Shah) asks that he help him on his illegal business scheme in return for lending him money, their relationship grows strained. Basudev and Kumar continue to insult each other for their respective values, when among mutual friends, arguing the merits of financial well-being against a principled life. The relationship gets worse when Kumar finds out that his only daughter Sangita (Sharmila Shah) is dating Prem (Krishna Malla), Basudev's son. Kumar initially attempts to convince Basudev to join his illegal business activities in order to bring the latter's economic status on par with his own as a precondition for marrying his daughter into Basudev's family. When both Basudev and Prem decline, Kumar gets Basudev fired from his job.

Basudev's youngest son is diagnosed with a kidney ailment that requires he be treated in India. Prem and Sangita manage the funds for the treatment with contribution from friends and family and leave for Delhi with the sick boy. Unable to come to terms with his daughter leaving home for Prem, a drunk Kumar goes to Basudev's house where he tries to rape Basudev's daughter and when intervened by Basudev's elderly father and Sabitri, physically assaults both. Basudev, learning what had happened, vows to end it once and for all, and breaks into Kumar's house, where he attacks Kumar from behind and kills him strangling him with his tie. Basudev walks into the night and dies of an apparent heart attack at his favourite stop in the city.

== Cast ==
- Harihar Sharma as the eponymous Professor Basudev Kattel,
- Shakuntala Sharma as Sabitri, Basudev's supportive wife, a homemaker, and mother of three
- Neer Shah as Kumar, a corrupt businessman, Basudev's friend who later turns the main antagonist
- Subhadra Adhikari as Anjana, Kumar's wife
- Krishna Malla as Prem, Basudev's eldest son, a taxi driver
- Sharmila Shah as Sangita, Kumar and Anjana's daughter
- Chandra Mala Sharma as Ranju, Kamal's lover
- Hari Bansha Acharya as Kamal (Roll no. 101)
- Madan Krishna Shrestha as Madan (Teacher)
- Laya Sangraula as Srikant Acharya, campus head
- Ram Chandra Adhikari as supporting actor

== Production ==
Basudev was produced under the banner of Manakamana Films. According to director Shah, Basudev was the first film to be made from a domestically produced script. The film scripts were, until then, written by Bollywood writers. Neer Shah, having a strong belief that the way to uplift Nepali cinema was to build stories and scripts from Nepali writers themselves, decided to make such a film himself. He chose an already popular Nepali book Kattel Sarko Chotpatak written by Dr. Dhruva Chandra Gautam to adapt from. The script for the film was written by the book's author Dhruba Chandra Gautam himself, in collaboration with Neer Shah, while the comedic bits were contributed to by Hari Bansha Acharya. The film was produced with investment from industrialist Binod Chaudhary, credited as the producer of the film, who, according to Shah, agreed to invest after the latter had given him a copy of the book to read.

The film began its principal photography in 1982. According to director Shah, the Information Department had delivered damaged raw stocks which compromised the quality of filming. As the first Nepali film to be shot in 16 mm, which needed to be converted to 35 mm, the damaged raw stock severely hampered the video. The popular song Yatri adapted from the eponymous poem by Laxmi Prasad Devkota was recorded in Mumbai, sung by Rabin Sharma.

The production budget of the film was Rs 1.4 Million. Rs 350 thousand was invested by Neer Shah, another 350 thousand was borrowed from Shah's friends and the remaining 700 thousand was invested by Binod Chaudhary.

== Release ==
According to director Shah, the film had trouble getting approved by the Censor Board which was very strict during the Panchayat regime. The film was released to theatres in 1984. Neer Shah has said that Binod Chaudhary was unenthusiastic about the final cut of the film, further speculating that the latter might have not finished the book before agreeing to produce the film. Dhruba Chandra Gautam was initially reported to have been disappointed with the liberties director Shah had taken with his script, but according to later accounts, he was more appreciative, acknowledging the different nature of a film medium to a written word, and concluding that it was a good work for the medium and the time.

== Reception and legacy ==
Upon release Basudev emerged to be one of the successful, and the most recognized film of Neer Shah. The film is also considered "one of the best examples of realistic Nepali cinema and marked a turning point towards film that raised awareness of social issues". Bibash Basti, for Annapurna Post Today in 2017, wrote that the film had stirred Nepali society and widened the "filmy-canvass". Released in the 1980s, the golden years of Nepali cinema, it is considered one of the best films of that decade.

The characters Basudev and Sabitri played by Harihar Sharma and Shakuntala Sharma respectively, have been well-received, and the actors who are married in real life were still seen as an exemplary couple almost 30-years after the film's release.

== Planned remake ==
Director Neer Shah has acknowledged that the film was not as good as the book. He has said that he was pressured to add song and dance, romantic scenes between Krishna Malla and Sharmila Shah as well as action sequences involving Krishna Malla to make it more marketable to a general audience, contrary to his own artistic choices as a director. He has said that he is working on a remake that will be truer to his own vision.
