= Gothalo =

Nepali-language film

- Directed by: Ujwal Ghimire
- Screenplay by: Brazesh Khanal
- Starring: Kiishna Malla; Sharmila Malla; Shree Krishna Shrestha; Saroj Khanal; Bipana Thapa; Shreejana Basnet
- Cinematography: Shyam Mohan Shrestha
- Edited by: Sambhu Pradhan
- Release date: 9 April 1996
- Country: Nepal
- Language: Nepali

Gothalo (Nepali: गोठालो) is a 1996 Nepali-language film directed by Ujwal Ghimire.The film written by Nepal´s most prolific writer Brazesh Khanal stars Krishna Malla, Saroj Khanal, Sarmila Malla and Shree Krishna Shrestha. The film was a hit in Nepal.

== Cast ==
- Krishna Malla
- Saroj Khanal
- Sharmila Malla
- Shree Krishna Shrestha

== Soundtrack ==
No.	Title	Singer(s)	Length
1.	"Dhanko Bala Jhule"	Udit Narayan, Deepa Jha, B.K Shahi	5:09
2.	"Dherai Din Pachhi"	Deepa Jha, Babul Supriyo	5:57
3.	"Maya Sanga Mohaniko"	Udit Narayan	5:27
