= Bachana Chahane Haru =

- Directed by: Pratap Subba
- Starring: Kiran Thakuri, Punya Prabha Lohar
- Music by: Shanti Thatal
- Release date: 1982
- Country: Nepal
- Language: Nepali

Bachana Chahane Haru (Nepali: बाँच्न चाहनेहरु) is a 1982 Nepali film directed by Pratap Subba. Shanti Thatal was the music director.

== Film ==
The film was shot in various places of Darjeeling district, India. The lyrics were penned by Norden Rumba. The hero of the movie was Kiran Thakuri. Biswa Hingmang played the role of a police subinspector. The lead actress Punya Prabha Lohar was featured as a prostitute in the movie. The director, Pratap Subba, later married Punya Prabha.

== Soundtrack ==
Track	Artists	Length
Mo Ta Mandina	Pema Lama, Bimala Cintury Pradhan	
Naya Naya Gham Ko Kiran	Bimala Cintury Pradhan	
Harara Barara	Pema Lama, Kunti Moktan, Monika Thatal, Bimala Cintury Pradhan	
Bachana Chahane Manchey	Pema Lama	
Mitho Mitho	Pema Lama, Bimala Cintury Pradhan	
Timro Resam Herai	Bimala Pradhan, Monika Thatal	
