= Kali Prasad Rijal =

Nepalese poet

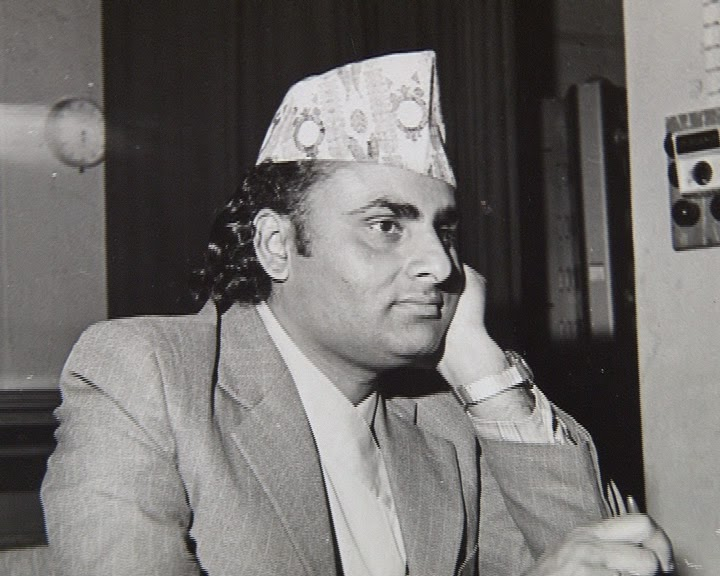
- Occupations: Poet; music composer

Kali Prasad Rijal (Nepali: कालीप्रसाद रिजाल) is a Nepalese poet, songwriter and music composer. He has been awarded as a best poet by Nepal Academy multiple times. Some of his popular songs includes Kehi Mitho Baat Gara and Ankha Chopi Narou Bhani which were sung by Narayan Gopal.

== Awards ==
- Best poet award 2025BS, 2026BS and 2033BS by Nepal Academy.
- Pahalman Singh Swar Memorial Trust Award, 2009
- Banira Pragya Awards, 2078BS
