= Tuborg Image Awards =

Annual music award

- Description: The oldest and most prestigious music awards in Nepal
- Country: Nepal
- First award: 1999
- Website: imagechannels.com

Television/radio coverage
- Network: Image Channel

The Tuborg Image Awards is an annual televised music awards ceremony held in Nepal since 1999. Tuborg Brewery sponsors the awards. The most recent ceremony included twenty-one different awards.

Bharat Regmi at the 9th Award Ceremony.

The 22nd Tuborg Image Awards ceremony was held in September 2022 at Hotel Soltey, where the Lifetime Achievement Award was presented to Madan Krishna Shrestha, and 15 other artists from across Nepal, including lyricist Ramesh Dahal, Karma Gyaljen Bamjan, Shawroopraj Acharya, Samichhya Adhikari, and others, received awards.

== See also ==
- Bindabasini Music Awards — Nepalese music awards
- Music of Nepal
- List of music awards
