= Maitighar =

1966 Nepali film

- theatrical released poster Maitighar
- Directed by: B.S. Thapa
- Written by: B.S. Thapa
- Produced by: Sumononjali Films
- Starring: Mala Sinha; Sunil Dutt; Rajendra Nath
- Music by: Jaidev
- Release date: 16 December 1966
- Running time: 134 minutes
- Country: Nepal
- Language: Nepali

Maitighar (transl. Maternal home) is a 1966 Nepali film directed by B.S. Thapa. It was the third Nepali film produced and the first featured film under a private banner. This film features Bollywood actress Mala Sinha in the lead role with Nepali actor Chidambar Prasad Lohani. It is considered as a classic in Nepali cinema.

== Plot ==
The film begins with the arrival of a psychiatrist at a jail. The jailer tells the psychiatrist that a woman who was sentenced to 15 years, although she has already served 12 years and is due for release, refuses to leave. The jailer reveals that the psychiatrist must convince her to go out of the jail. The woman, who at first refuses to even talk to the psychiatrist, eventually agrees to tell him her story after he says that he cannot grant her wish to stay in the jail if she doesn’t explain why.

Maya was born in Pokhara without her mother. One day, while singing songs with her friends near Phewa Taal, she meets Mohan, a young man who was there hunting. They soon fall in love and get married despite Mohan’s mother being against their marriage. They have a son, and Mohan leaves for Britain to study.

Two years later, when Mohan returns from Britain, his parents host a party for his homecoming, inviting guests even from Kathmandu. But while preparing for the party, Mohan goes hunting with his friend Vijay, promising to be back within an hour. As the party begins and guests pour in, everyone looks for Mohan, but he is nowhere to be found. While they wait, the guests begin celebrating with songs and dancing. Suddenly, Vijay returns carrying Mohan’s body, revealing that they had an accident while speeding home. Vijay survived with injuries, but Mohan died on the spot.

Grieving Mohan’s death, Maya is heartbroken. Her mother-in-law blames Maya’s bad luck for her son’s death. Neighbors who once praised her beauty and fortune now curse her. When her in-laws refuse to let her attend a kirtan, Maya decides to leave the village. She prays for her son Ratu and leaves him in the care of his grandparents, who hate her but not the child. She then leaves her home.

After walking for days, she stumbles upon two goons who try to take advantage of her. While fleeing from them, she runs into a woman who helps her escape. Maya tells the woman, whom she calls Aama, that she has left a life of hell and hopes to change her future. Aama takes her in, lets her rest, and never asks her to do any work. Eventually, however, it is revealed that Maya—now called Chhotti—has been tricked. Aama runs a brothel and plans to sell her to rich clients.

When Chhotti realizes the truth, she tries to escape, but Aama tells her she cannot. Chhotti attempts suicide when Aama threatens to have her raped by another man if she doesn’t comply. After a nightmare of the assault, she again tries to kill herself, but stops when she remembers she is two months pregnant with Mohan’s child and doesn’t want to lose the last memory of him.

Gobre Dai and Aama, worried that Chhotti might succeed in killing herself and bring them trouble, come up with another plan. They decide to have her sing and dance for the customers, which would earn them more money. Chhotti reluctantly agrees after Gobre Dai promises her that he sees her like his own sister and will never let any harm come to her.

With Gobre Dai’s help, she secretly visits Ratu, though he never knows she is his mother. Later, she gives birth to her daughter Rekha and sends her to a school in Kathmandu. She also supports Ratu when his grandparents die and he cannot support himself while studying law. She often visits Rekha at her school and wishes that one day both her children will meet each other.

During her time at the brothel, a regular client named Sahuji becomes obsessed with her. He calls her Nirmaya and demands that she perform only for him. He constantly asks her to accept him, and when she refuses, he threatens to poison himself. Once, after her rejection, he warns that he will take action against her refusal. From then on, she came to be known as Nirmaya.

At one of Rekha’s school functions in Kathmandu, where Sunil Dutt is the chief guest, one of Sahuji’s men sees Nirmaya with Rekha. Back at the brothel, Sahuji confronts her, threatening to either take Rekha for himself or ruin her reputation by revealing that her mother works in a brothel.

Terrified for her daughter, Nirmaya invites Sahuji the next day, but poisons him and kills him. At her trial, Nirmaya’s lawyer argues that Sahuji poisoned himself, but the prosecutor is none other than her own son, Ratu, now known as Ravi Vikram. During the case, Ravi calls her a prostitute, and Nirmaya cries out “Ratu” in anguish.

Shocked to hear a stranger call him by his childhood name, Ravi visits her. Nirmaya reveals that she is his mother and tells him her whole story, including how she only killed Sahuji to protect Rekha. This revelation moves Ravi, and he argues for self-defense, but Nirmaya is still sentenced to 15 years in prison.

Before she is taken away, her son Ravi Vikram (Ratu) and her daughter Rekha finally meet each other for the first time. Nirmaya expresses her happiness that her children have been united, even though she must go to prison. She worries that no one will want to marry Rekha because she is the daughter of a brothel worker, but one of Rekha’s classmates steps forward to ask for her hand.

Years later, old and frail, Nirmaya tells her life story to the psychiatrist in jail. While recounting her memories, she suddenly dies. The film ends with her funeral, attended by both her children.

== Cast ==
- Mala Sinha as Maya
- Chidambar Prasad Lohani as Mohan
- Yadav Kharel
- Tika Bhushan Dahal
- Yam Bahadur Khadka
- Sunita Regmi
- Yadu Kumari
- Pratibha Sam
- Jana Darshan Sam
- Gopi Krishna
- K.B. Lamichhane
- Keshab Rana
- B.S. Thapa
- Nanda Kishore Timilsina
- Sunil Dutt in a special appearance
- Rajendra Nath in a special appearance
- Prem Singh Bhandari as Jailer

== Soundtrack ==
No.	Title	Singer(s)	Length
1.	"Chha Salaam Kasari Bolam"	C.P. Lohani	5:01
2.	"Hansi Kheli Yehi Dhuloma"	Manna Dey	4:00
3.	"Hera Dharti Dagmagai"	Manna Dey	5:54
4.	"Hey Suna Aaja Ma Timi Haru"	C.P. Lohani	4:25
5.	"Jai Jai Janani Nepal"	Manna Dey	2:07
6.	"Jun Mato Ma Mero"	Lata Mangeshkar	3:05
7.	"Kala Kurtaile"	C.P. Lohani, Aruna Lama	5:34
8.	"Ma Pyar Bechidinchu"	Asha Bhosle	4:24
9.	"Namana Laaj Yestari"	Prem Dhoj Pradhan, Usha Mangeshkar	4:06
10.	"Salloma Bhanu Sallo Ho"	Aruna Lama, Geeta Dutt	4:23
11.	"Sanu Maya Mero Maya Lai"	Aruna Lama, Geeta Dutt	1:20
12.	"Tinai Sahar Nepali Ma"	C.P. Lohani	3:40
13.	"Unbhoma Jharne Banko Bato"	C.P. Lohani, Aruna Lama	5:20
14.	"Yo Ho Mero Pran Bhanda Pyaro Maitighar"	Asha Bhosle	5:23
Total length:			52:57

The music was scored by Jaidev, a veteran music maestro. Lata Mangeshkar, Asha Bhosle, Usha Mangeshkar, Manna Dey and Geeta Dutt did the playback singing, along with Nepali singers Prem Dhoj Pradhan, C.P. Lohani and Aruna Lama. Lata Mangeshkar sang a Nepali song that was penned by the late King Mahendra Bir Bikram Shah Dev of Nepal.

== Production ==
Maitighar was the first film to be produced under a private banner in Nepal. It had many Indians contributing towards the making of the film - actors, musicians and technicians. The place where the office for film shooting was established in Kathmandu, Nepal has been named Maitighar after the movie.

== Reception ==
Maithighar was a commercially successful movie in Nepal after the success of the movie the place this movie was filmed in got named Maithighar.

== Gallery ==
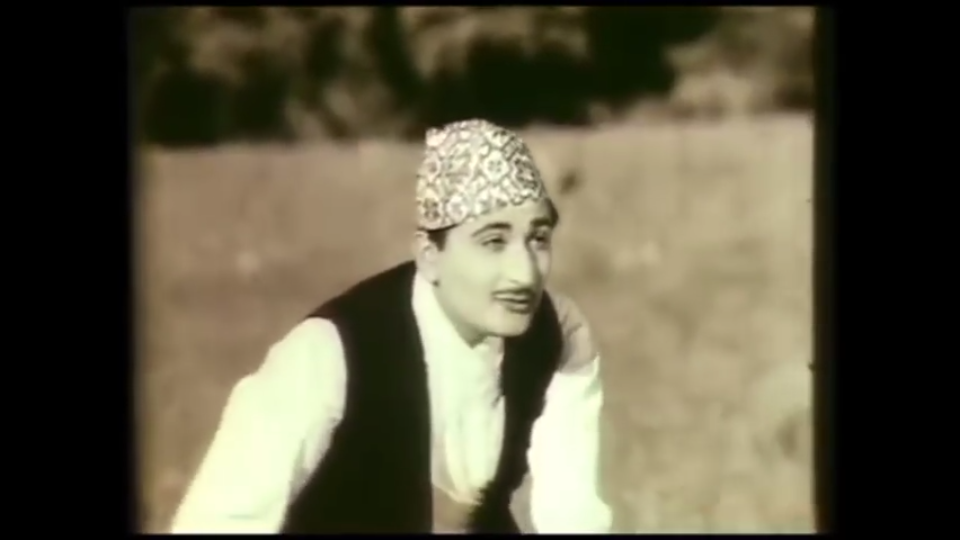
Chidambar Prasad Lohani as Mohan (Moha)

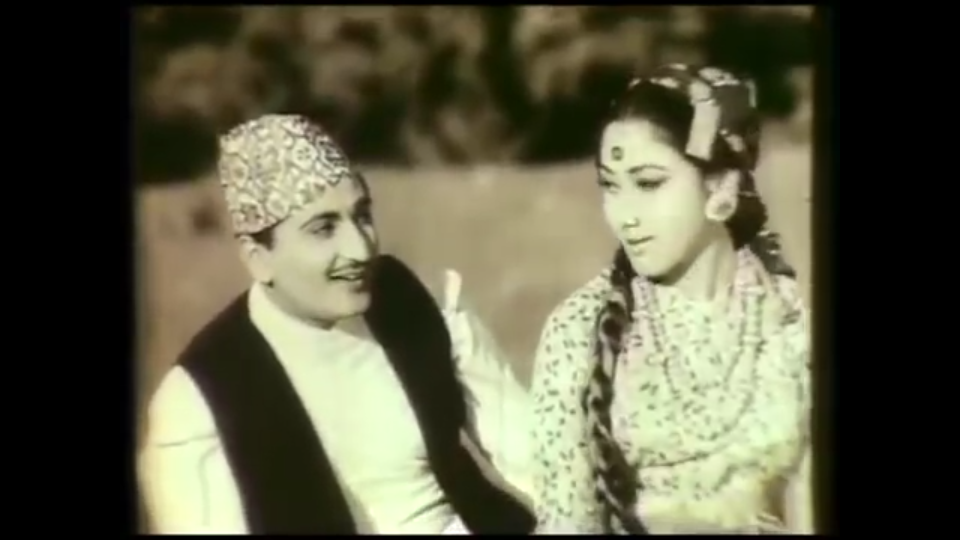
Chidambar Prasad Lohani as Mohan and Mala Sinha as Maya, main protagonist

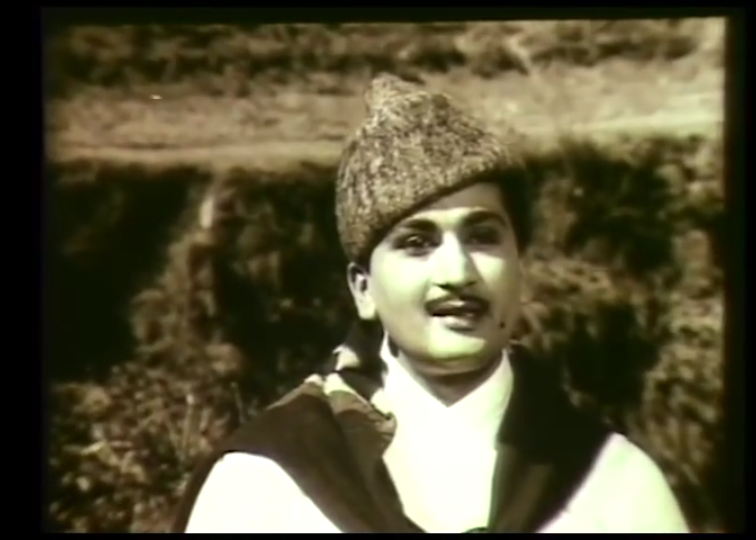
Chidambar Prasad Lohani as Mohan, son of the village aristocrat

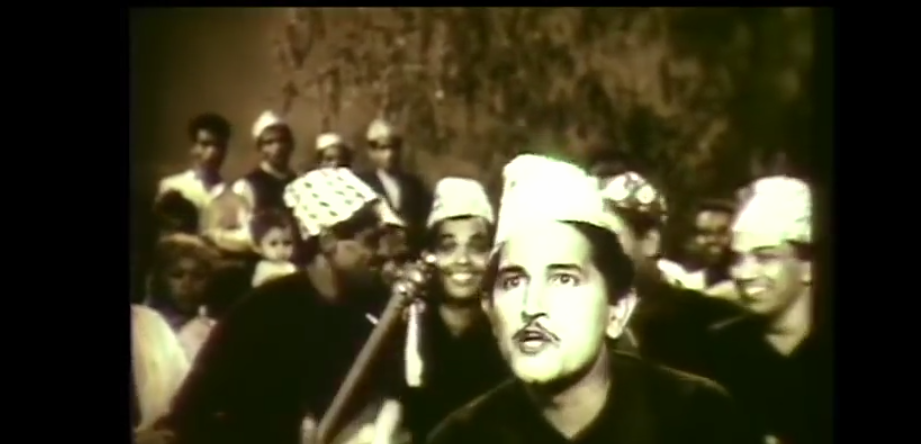
Unknown actor in the song Kala Kurtai ley

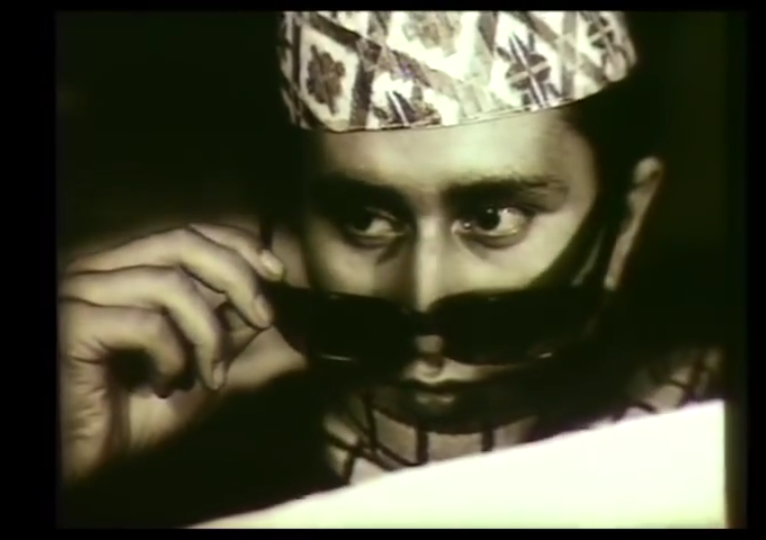
a spy of the main antagonist

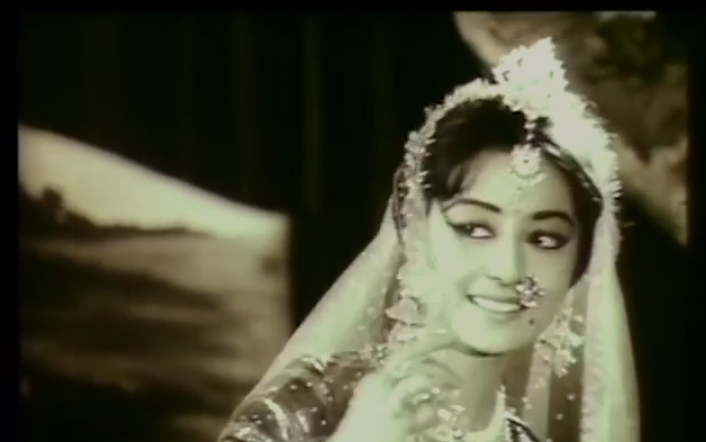
Rekha, daughter of main protagonist Maya

== See also ==
- List of Nepalese films
- Cinema of Nepal
