= Ram Chandra Adhikari =

Nepali actor

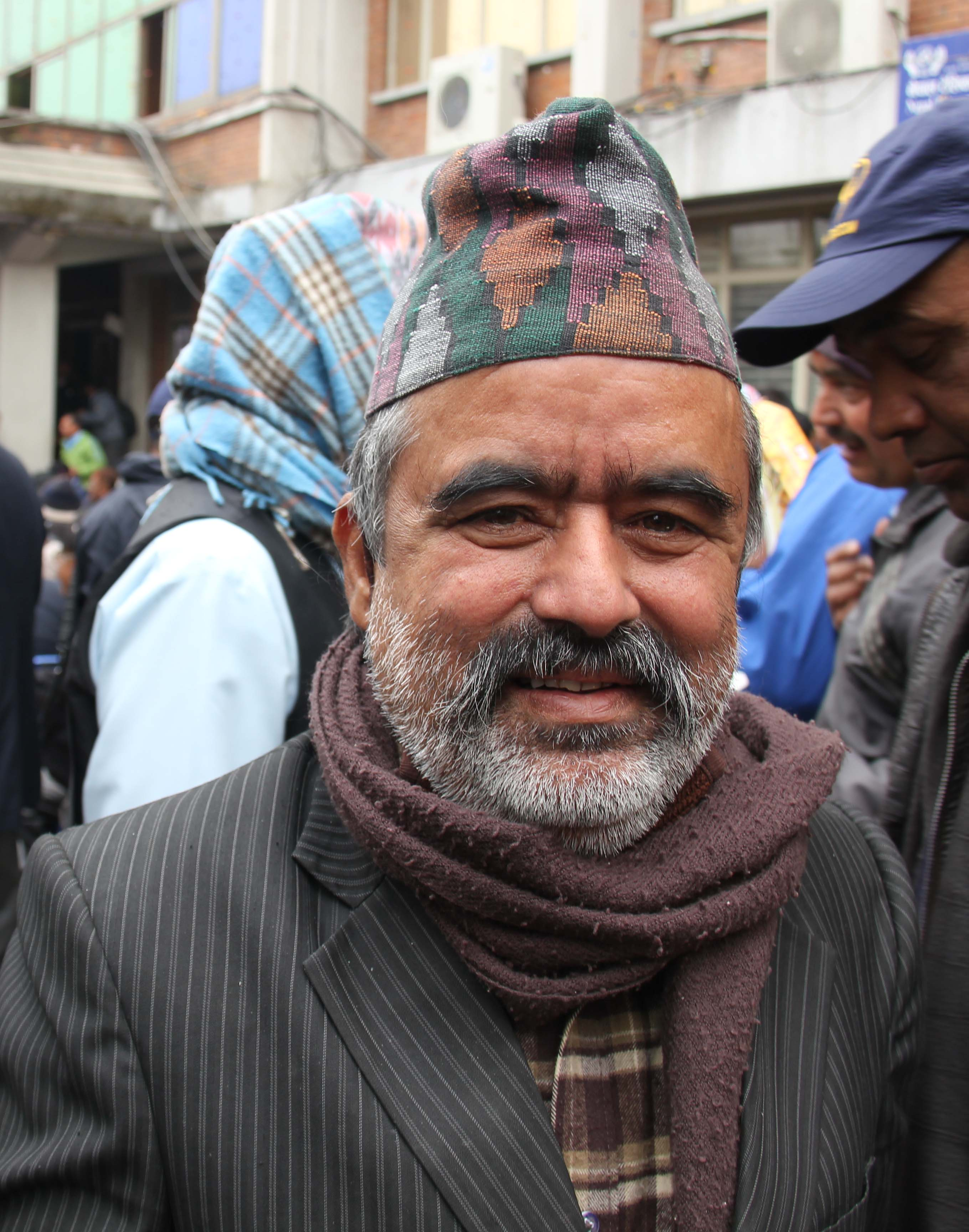
- Ram Chandra Adhikari
- Born: Gothatar, Kathmandu
- Other name: रामचन्द्र अधिकारी
- Occupation: Film/Television actor
- Spouse: Sita Adhikari

Ram Chandra Adhikari (Nepali: रामचन्द्र अधिकारी) is a comedian actor of Nepal popularly known by pseudonym name Kaji Ba(Nepali: काजी बा) or Gokte Kaji (Nepali: गोक्ते काजी). He has acted in about 400 Nepali films and various TV sitcoms as a comedian and character actor.

== Biography ==
Adhikari was born in Gothatar, Kathmandu. At the age of 10, he had to start working as a home assistant in a family that his parents assigned to him. Due to poor working condition, he ran from that place and went to Hetauda. There he worked in a palace of Rana family. From there he went to Benaras, India. However he could not stay there for long and returned to Nepal after seven months. On the way back, he temporarily worked in an automobile workshop in Sarlahi. Later he returned to Kathmandu.

In 2030 BS (1973–1974), he got a job in Nepal Telecom at Kathmandu. He acted for a local theatre group in Jorpati at around 2035 BS (1978–1979) in a play named Sachha Prem by Bhairav Aryal. Due to the popularity of the play, he was invited to work with other contemporary artists. During his career, he worked in night shift in Nepal telecom while at day he worked as an actor. Adhikari has played in more than 400 films and various television series. Some of his works are as follows:

He also played in the longest running sitcom of Nepal titled Meri Bassai (Nepali:मेरी बास्सै). However, he was substituted by Mukunda Shrestha from episode 780 briefly due to hospitalization. Following the contribution to the industry, he became the first person to get life insurance by the Film Development Board, a government entity to promote films in Nepal.

=== List of telefilms and series ===
- Meri Bassai (मेरी बास्सै)- the longest running sitcom in Nepal
- Adhyaro Ujyalo (अँध्यारो उज्यालो)
- Pritvi Narayan Shah (पृथ्वी नारायण शाह), 2041 BS (1984–1985)
- Chakrabyuh (चक्रब्युह)
- Tadhako Basti (टाढाको वस्ती)

=== List of films ===
- Basudev (वासुदेव)
- Koseli (कोशेली)
- Chelibeti (चेलिबेटी)
- Maya Pirati (माया पिरती)
- Adhikar (अधिकार)
- Chino (चिनो)
- Badal (1994)

Deuta 
Prem Pinda
