= Meera Rana =

Nepali singer and politician

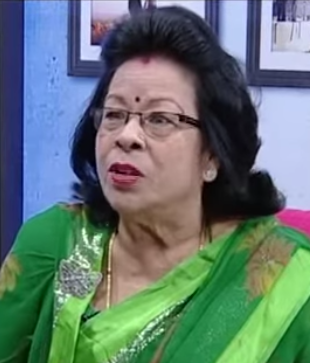

Personal details
- Born: 24 September 1951
- Political party: Rastriya Prajatantra Party
- Occupation: Singer

Meera Rana, also Mira Rana (Nepali: मीरा राणा; born 24 September 1951) is a Nepali singer who has sung over 1,600 songs in her 55-year musical career. She is considered a part of "Nepal's first wave of recording stars", recording folk, classical and even pop songs, during the first wave of country's modernisation after the fall of the Rana regime. She has collaborated with artists like Narayan Gopal, Gopal Yonjan, Kumar Basnet, Udit Narayan Jha and Ram Thapa. She was one of the 365 singers who contributed to the song Melancholy, which holds the Guinness world record for "Most Vocal Solos (365) in a Song Recording". She has also joined Nepali politics.

== Early life ==
Meera was born to Nirmala and her husband Shambhu Prasad Mishra, a tabala player, in Kathmandu on 24 September 1951. She studied music academically.

== Career ==
She was Chief Music Manager at Radio Nepal for over 35 years. She recorded more than 1,700 songs in a musical career spanning almost six decades. In 2009, she joined national politics as a member of Rastriya Prajatantra Party Nepal. In 2013, she contested for parliament from Kathmandu 3 constituency. In recognition of her contribution to Nepali music, she was awarded the Narayan Gopal memorial prize in 2016, shared with Gyanu Rana.
