= Sharmila Malla =

Nepalese actress

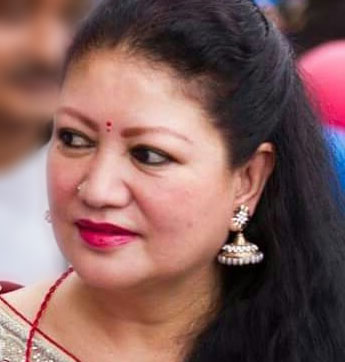
- Born: Sharmila Shah
- Occupations: Actress, model, producer
- Years active: 1984 – present
- Spouse: Krishna Malla
- Children: 1

Sharmila Malla (Nepali: शर्मिला मल्ल) is a Nepalese actress, model and producer. She made her acting debut in the Kanchhi movie and other notable films include Ke Ghar Ke Dera, Basudev, Maya Pirati, Badal, Gothalo.

== Filmography ==
Year	Title	Role
1984	Kanchhi	
1985	Ke Ghar Ke Dera	
1985	Basudev	
1986	Pandra Gate	
1988	Maya Pirati	
2013	Chahanchhu ma Timilai Nai	
1991	Chino	
1990	Bijaya Parajaya	
1990	Cheli Beti	
1993	Sankalpa	
1994	Badal	
1996	Gothalo	

== Awards ==
Year	Award	Category	Film	Result	Ref(s)
2021	National Navdurga Award	None		Honoured	
