= Guru Prasad Mainali =

Nepalese writer (1900 – 1971)

- गुरुप्रसाद मैनाली
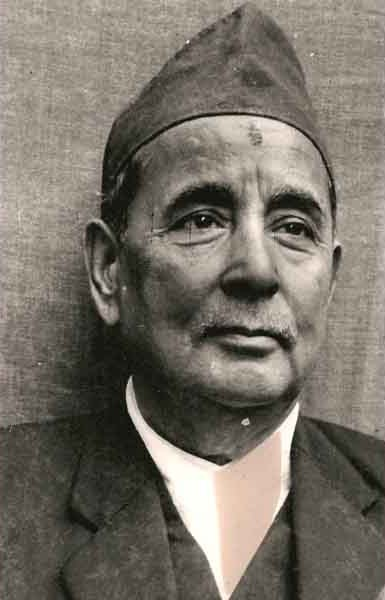
- Born: 7 September 1900; Kanpur, Kavrepalanchok, Nepal
- Died: 8 June 1971 (aged 70); Kathmandu
- Occupations: Writer, civil servant, Judge
- Parents: Kashi Nath Mainali (father); Kashi Rupa Devi Mainali (mother)

Guru Prasad Mainali (Nepali: गुरुप्रसाद मैनाली; 7 September 1900 – 8 June 1971) was a Nepalese short story writer and civil servant. Mainali is considered one of the best short story writers of Nepali literature. He is best known for his short story anthology Naso.

== Early life ==
Mainali was born in a middle class Brahmin family in Kanpur, in (1957 BS. bhadra 23) Kavrepalanchok district. The son of Kashi Nath Mainali and Kashi Rupa Devi Mainali, he joined a government job for his living.

== Career ==
Mainali's works contributed to the development of Nepali short stories. Mainali wrote only eleven short stories, but his knowledge of the Nepalese society made him an excellent describer of the life in the countryside. His stories alone possessed all the qualities of modern short stories during his time. He started writing stories to publish in a literary magazine, Sharada. His first story was Naso (The Ward). Most of his stories were published between 1935 and 1938. Strongly influenced by the Hindi fiction writer Prem Chand, Mainali intimately dealt with his characters from rural Nepal. Due to his contact with people from different parts of the country as a judge transferred from one district court to another, Mainali had ample opportunity to study the human character in various situations at close quarters. The description in his stories of the plight of the common people in Nepal due to constraints imposed upon individuals by traditional values and beliefs remains unmatched. He is arguably the first modern short story writer of Nepal. Some of his renowned short stories are Naso (The Ward), Paralko Aago (A Blaze in the Straw), Shaheed (The Martyr) and Chhimeki (Neighbors). Naso is also the title of his anthology. Some of his stories are included in text books of primary school and secondary schools in Nepal.

Naso and Paralko Aago are also translated in English. The former was translated as The Ward by Theodore Riccardi in 1964 and the later was translated as A Blaze in the Straw by Michael Hutt in 1991.

== Works ==
- Naso (The Ward)
- Paralko Aago (A Blaze in the Straw), filmed as Paral Ko Aago in 1978.
- Abhagi (The Unfortunate)
- Shaheed (The Martyr)
- Chhimeki (Neighbors)
- Kartabya (Duty)
- Bida (The Farewell)
- Prayaschit (Regret)
- Pratyagaman (Return)
- Paapko Parinam (Result of Sin)
- Chita ko Jwala (Pyre Blaze)

== Personal life and death ==
He was married to Yashoda Devi Mainali. He had ten children: four sons and six daughters. He died on 8 June 1971 (25 Jestha 2028 BS) in Kathmandu.
