= Shiva Shrestha =

Nepali actor (born 1953)

- शिव श्रेष्ठ
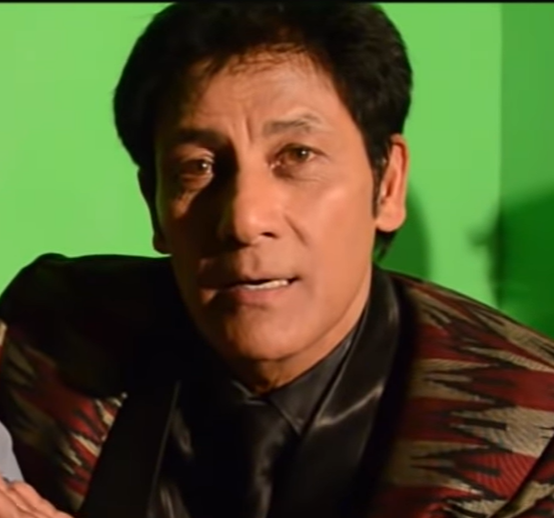
- Shrestha in 2017
- Born: Shiva Sundar Shrestha; 20 June 1953 (age 73); Kathmandu, Kingdom of Nepal
- Other name: Thuldai (big brother)
- Occupations: Actor, producer
- Years active: 1982–present
- Notable work: Jeevan Rekha, Chino, Thuldai, Sworga, Kanchhi, Jetho Kanchho, Raju Raja Ram

Shiva Sundar Shrestha (Nepali: शिवसुन्दर श्रेष्ठ), known professionally as Shiva Shrestha, is a Nepali actor best known for his work in action films. He is renowned as the "Action King" of Nepali cinema. He has starred in many commercially successful films, including Jeevan Rekha (1982), Badalindo Akash (1984), Kanchi (1984), Bishwas (1986), Chino (1989), Manakamana (1991), Milan (1993), Dharma Sankat (1998), and Thuldai (1999), etc. During the 1980s, 1990s, and the early 2000s, he was called the "second pillar" of the film industry because of the hits he has given.

Shrestha has also acted in Pakistani films; he has acted in over a dozen Urdu films, seven of which were commercially very successful. He made his come back to Nepali cinema in 2016 with the film Bagmati, where he appeared alongside Rajesh Hamal. In 2018, he announced a film, Euta Esto Prem Kahani, which he would write, produce, and star his son Shakti, who would debut through this film. Shrestha was set to feature in a prominent role himself.

== Shiva Shrestha Foundation ==
Shiva Shrestha founded the Shiva Shrestha Foundation, a non-profit organization dedicated to uplifting Nepal through the promotion of culture, compassion and community service. The foundation focuses on key thematic areas including health, education, cultural preservation, peace promotion, environmental conservation, sports and agriculture.

== Filmography ==
=== Nepal Bhasa films ===
- Krisha Gautami (2016)

=== Nepali films ===
- Jeevan Rekha (1982)
- Kanchhi (1984)
- Bishwas (1986)
- Badalido Aakash (1988)
- Chino (1989)
- Sankalpa (1992)
- Aatankbadi
- Milan (1993)
- Sapana (1994)
- Sworga (1994)
- Raanko (1994)
- Truck Driver (1994)
- Janma Bhoomi (1994)
- Pachheuri (1996)
- Sakkali Nakkali (1996)
- Agni Pariksha (1997)
- Dharma Sankat (1997)
- Miss Bangkok (1999)
- Thuldai (1999)
- Laxman Rekha (1999)
- Sorha Barse Jovan (1999)
- Mama Ghar (2000)
- Malati (2000)
- Naatedar (2001)
- Mero Hajur (2002)
- Jetho Kancho (2003)
- Deshdrohi (2004)
- Raju Raja Ram (2005)
- Yuddha (2007)
- Mister Don (2008)
- Ransangram (2010)
- Raaj (2011)
- Action (2015)
- Bagmati (2016)
- Danda Ko Bar Pipal (2021)
- Prem Geet 3 (2022)

=== Pakistani films ===
Shrestha has appeared in many Pakistani Urdu films. During his five-year period, his action and dancing skills were popular among Pakistani audiences. The list below represents some of the Pakistani films he appeared in.

- Lady Commando (1989)
- Bangkok Kay Chor (1986)
- Lawa (1984)
- Humse Hai Zamana (1984)
- Tiger (1985)
- Lawa (1985)
- Hum Ek Hai (1987)
- Mazboot (1993)
- Zameen Aasman (1994)
