= Bulu Mukarung =

Bulu Mukarung is a music composer and writer from the Nepali music industry.
