= Paral Ko Aago =

- Movie poster
- Directed by: Pratap Subba
- Story by: Guru Prasad Mainali
- Produced by: Cineroma
- Starring: Tanka Sharma, Prem Chhetri, I.K. Singh, Menuka Pradhan, Basundhara Bhusal,
- Cinematography: Sunil Chakravarty
- Edited by: Gangadhar Naskar
- Release date: 1978
- Running time: 79 minutes
- Country: Nepal
- Language: Nepali

Paral Ko Aago (Nepali: परालको आगो, English: A Blaze in the Straw) is a 1978 Nepali black-and-white film directed by Pratap Subba and produced by Cineroma.

It is based on a story of the same name by the yatharthabadh (realist) Nepali writer Guru Prasad Mainali and produced by Devkota Films. The story concerns a couple, Chame and Gauthali.

== Plot ==
A man beats his wife after getting drunk and she runs away. The man starts looking for her and finally gets her. The film ends with the title Paral ko aago.

== Cast and crew ==
| Director | Pratap Subba |
| Story | Guru Prasad Mainali |
| Screenplay | Pratap Subba |
| Dialogue | Pratap Subba |
| Cinematographer | Sunil Chakravarty |
| Editor | Gangadhar Naskar |
| Lyricist | Man Bahadur Mukhiya, Indra Thapaliya |
| Music director | Shanti Thatal |
| Playback Singer | Shankar Gurung, Dawa Gyalmo, Deepa Jha, Aruna Lama, Pema Lama |
| Choreographer | Dev Dutta Thatal |
| Background Score | Alaknath Dey |
| Starting | Tanka Sharma, Prem Chhetri, I.K. Singh, Menuka Pradhan, Basundhara Bhusal, |

== Production ==
The film was shot in areas around Kalimpong and Darjeeling, India in 1976. Released in 1978, the black-and-white movie proved to be a great success due to its story and melodious music.

== Soundtrack ==
| No. | Title | Singer(s) | Length |
|---|---|---|---|
| 1. | "Chaubandi Ko Toonama" | Aruna Lama, Dawa Gyalmo, Shankar Gurung | 3:16 |
| 2. | "Dherai Chubul Nagara Baini" | Dawa Gyalmo, Aruna Lama | 2:17 |
| 3. | "Udi Jau Bhane Mo Panchi Hoina" | Aruna Lama | 4:31 |
| 4. | "Suna Maya" | Aruna Lama, Deepa Gahatraj | 4:29 |

The lyrics of the songs were written Manbahadur Mukhiya and Indra Thapaliya and the songs were sung by Aruna Lama, Dawa Gyalmo, Pema Lama, Shankar Gurung and Deepa Gahatraj.

== Dance ==
Biswa Hingmang was the lead male dancer in the song "Chowbandi ko Tunama". It was his first appearance in Nepali film. The dance was choreographed by Deodutt Thatal, a renowned dance director of Nepali cinema. In the dance group, the lead female dancers were Shanti Chhetri, Purnima Khargdha, Shanta Gurung and Sobha Chhetri. The dance was shot near Rangeet Khola at Singhla, Darjeeling.
