= Prakash Shrestha =

Nepali singer (born 1957)

- Born: Prakash Shrestha; 28 January 1957; Birgunj, Nepal
- Genres: Film, Pop, Classical, Folk
- Occupation: Playback Singer
- Instruments: Vocals, Harmonium
- Years active: 1973–present
- Spouse: Uma Shrestha
- Website: https://www.youtube.com/@PrakashShrestha.Singer

Prakash Shrestha (born January 28, 1957) is a Nepali playback singer and recording artist. With a career starting in 1973, he has recorded over 1,000 songs, released 12 albums, and lent his vocals to 150+ Nepali films. He is the recipient of the Narayan Gopal Music Award, Chhinnalata Award, and royal state decorations.

== Early life ==
Prakash Shrestha was born on January 28, 1957 in Birgunj, Nepal to father Chandra Man Shrestha and Mother Bimala Devi Shrestha, he completed his Bachelor of Commerce (B.Com) at Thakur Ram Multiple Campus. He later pursued formal classical music training in India, earning a Diploma in Music (Sangeet Prabhakar) from Allahabad University.

== Career ==
Prakash Shrestha launched his professional career in 1973, recording over 1,000 songs, releasing 12 albums, performing in more than 500 concerts, and lending his voice to over 150 Nepali films. His hits include "Fewatal ko Angan," "Safal Timro," and "Kanchi He Kanchi".

Shrestha served with the Nepal Airlines Corporation for decades.

== Awards and honors ==
- 1979: 1st prize winner: 29th Birthday celebrations of Radio Nepal
- 1989: Best singer award by Abhiyan
- 1989: Consolation prize in ABU golden kite world song festival in Malaysia
- 1991: Narayan Gopal Music award
- 1993: Best Playback singer award in Sanmiguel film awards
- 1994: Priya Award
- 1995: National Vision Busy Award
- 1996: Sayapatri Award
- 1998: Nai Kalanidhi Award
- 1999: Chhinnalata Award
- 1999: Rastriya Gaurav Yuva Award
- 1999: Mansarovar cine Award
- 2000: Sikha Sur Award
- 2000: Bhupal Man Karki Award
- 2001: Nepal Film Artists National Association Award
- 2001: Nepal Motion Picture Association Award
- 1974: Subharajyavishek Padak
- 1995: Prabal Gorkha Dakhsin Bahu from the late King Birendra.
- 1996: Gaddi Arohan Rajat Mahotsa (Silver Jubilee medal) Padak
- 2001: Birendra Aishwarya Sewa Padak
- 2004: Prakhyat Trishakti Patta Padak by former King Gyanendra.

Prakash Shrestha has traveled far and wide both within and outside the country.

== Concert ==
In 1999, along with Madan Krishna Shrestha, Haribansha Acharya, Kiran KC, Raja Ram Poudyal and dancer Saragna, Prakash went on two month long concert tour in United State of America.
