= Harihar Sharma =

Nepalese actor and director

- Born: Pyuthan District, Nepal
- Occupation: Actor
- Known for: Movie Basudev(बासुदेव)
- Spouse: Sakuntala Gurung Sharma

Harihar Sharma (Nepali: हरिहर शर्मा) is a Nepali theatre and film actor, director and the vice chancellor of Nepal Academy of Music and Drama, a government body established to promote music and drama of Nepal. He has acted in popular movies such as Basudev. He is a contemporary of Neer Shah and Shanti Maskey. Sharma has received various national level awards including the Order of Tri Shakti Patta and the Order of Gorkha Dakshina Bahu.

== Biography ==
Sharma was born in Pyuthan District of Nepal. He studied up to the primary school there and went to Assam for secondary school. He returned to Nepal after high school and studied in Amrit Science College up to the intermediate level. After completing the intermediate level, he joined the Nepal Academy as an actor. He was promoted to director and administration head in the same organization.

His first acting was in a theatre for a drama named Aamako Pukar (आमाको पुकार) in 1966 and his first feature film was Sindoor in 2024 BS (1967–1968). His most popular character was his role of an old man in the film Basudev when he was only 24 years old.

From 2053BS to 2063 BS he worked as director for Cultural Department and as a secretary of Nepal Academy from 2064 to 2066 BS. He was appointed by the First Oli cabinet as the vice chancellor of Nepal Academy of Music and Drama in 30 December 2018 (15 Poush 2075 BS)

He is married to Sakuntala Gurung Sharma and has two sons.

== Plays ==
Sharma has acted in more than 60 Nepali and Newari theatre plays. Some of them are:

- Aamako Sapana (आमाको सपना)
- Jeevan Beema (जीवन बीमा)
- Andha ko pani aankha khuleko huncha (अन्धाको पनि आँखा खुलेको हुन्छ)
- Antardwanda (अन्तरद्वन्द्व)
- Prithvi Narayan Shah (पृथ्वीनारायण शाह)
- Ek Sima Yehi Tungincha (एक सीमा यही टुंगिन्छ)
- Maanis ra mukunda (मानिस र मुकुण्डो)
- Jaba gham lagcha (जब घाम लाग्छ)
- Purano ghar (पुरानो घर)
- Gangalal ko Chita (गंगालालको चिता)
- Samaj ka Naike (समाजका नाइके)

== Films ==
Sharma has acted in more than 65 movies. Some of them are:

- Basudev(बासुदेव)
- Prayasi (प्रेयसी)
- Ranko (राँको)
- Jwala (ज्वाला)
- Sindoor (सिन्दुर)
- Badlido Aakas (बदलिँदो आकाश)
- Maya Preeti (माया–प्रीति)
- Karja (कर्जा)
- Prem Pinda (प्रेमपिण्ड)
- Chelibeti (चेलिबेटी)
- Priyasi (प्रियसी)
- Santaan tharitharika (सन्तान थरीथरीका)
- Mohani (मोहनी)
- Yo Maya Ko Sagar (यो मायाको सागर)
- Chatyang (चट्याङ)
- Dhanpati (धनपति)

== Awards ==
Sharma has been awarded with:

- Order of Gorkha Dakshina Bahu
- Order of Tri Shakti Patta (त्रिशक्ति पट्ट)
- Indrarajyalaxmi Pragya Puraskar (इन्द्र राज्यलक्ष्मी प्रज्ञा पुरस्कार)
- Sarwanam Puraskar (सर्वनाम पुरस्कार)
- Pragay Prathisthan Dhirga Sewa Padak (प्रज्ञा प्रतिष्ठान दीर्घ सेवा पदक)
