= Karma Yonzon =

Nepali musician

- Born: Darjeeling, India
- Genres: Nepali music
- Occupations: Composer; Musician

Karma Yonzon is a composer of Nepali music based in Kathmandu, Nepal. He is the brother of musician Gopal Yonzon.

He has composed music for numerous singers like Narayan Gopal, Aruna Lama, Dilmaya Khati, Kumar Subba, Daisy Baraily and Pema Lama. He scored the music for the well-known Nepali play Ani Deurali Runcha, written by Man Bahadur Mukhia with songs like Sarangi Ko Taar Le Mero, Hey Phool Chudera Laney Ho and Deurali Ko Thiti Ho.
