= Santosh Panta =

Nepalese actor, comedian, screenwriter, and director

Santosh Pant
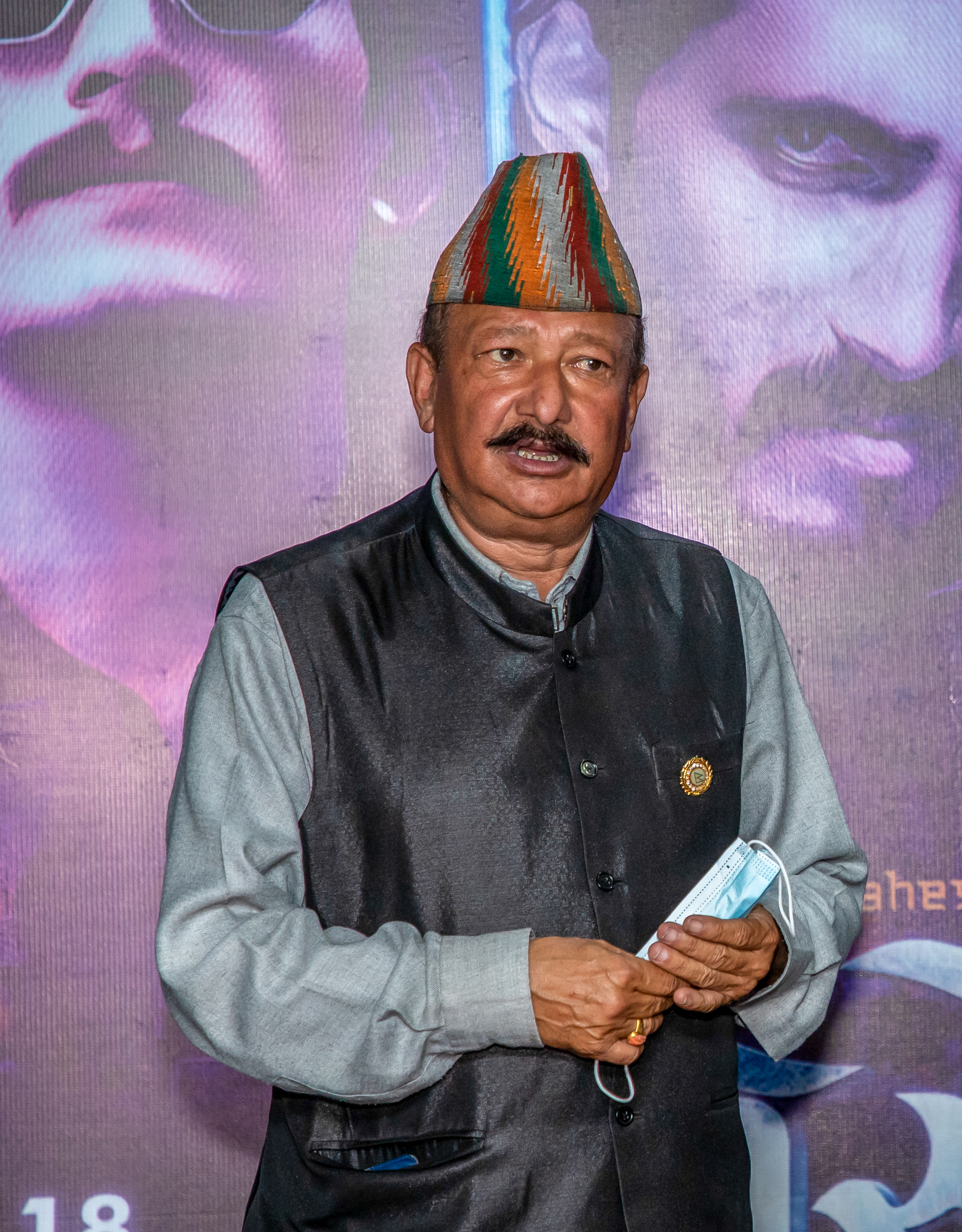
- Santosh Pant in 2022
- Born: March 14th, 1960 Kathmandu
- Occupations: Actor; screenwriter; director; Songwriter
- Years active: 1967–present
- Known for: Hijo Aaja Ka Kura

Santosh Pant (Nepali:सन्तोष पन्त) is a Nepalese comedian actor, director and songwriter. He is known for his sitcom Hijo Aja Ka Kura that was aired from Nepal Television. He has featured in about 30 movies.

== Biography ==
Santosh Panta was born in Kathmandu. He started his acting journey at the age of 7 as a school representative, for which he was awarded a gold medal by King Mahendra. At 15, he auditioned for the movie Maan ko Baadh; however, he could not act in the movie because of age bar. In 2040 BS, he acted in his first movie, Badalido Aakash directed by Laxminath Sharma.

When he started to direct and act in the sitcom Hijo Aja Ka Kura, he stopped acting in the movies. The sitcom showed contemporary social issues. Initially, the name of the series was Aja Bholi Ka Kura; however, after the 17th episode, it was renamed to Hijo Aja Ka Kura based on a suggestion from Neer Shah. The sitcom ran for 13 years with 699 episodes. After a break of about 10 years, the sitcom was restarted on Kantipur Television and ran for 117 episodes. The series is considered as a platform for various Nepalese comedian artists such as Rama Thapaliya, Bijaya Giri, Dinesh D.C., Deepak Raj Giri, Deepa Shree Niraula and Jitu Nepal. The series was also turned into a feature film in 2020.

Panta was in the culture division of Nepalese Army where he directed the series called Matole Magdaina, Affaile Dinu Parcha. He also directed and acted in various Gaijatra comedy performances, theatre and television series.

He was one of the Judge for a reality show called Comedy Champion.

Panta is married to Pratibha Panta. He has a child born as male (named Pratik) but changed her gender to female by surgery and renamed herself to Caitlin.

=== Movies ===
He has acted in various movies. Some are as follows:

- Chauka Dau, 2019
- Kismat 2, 2016
- Saavadhan, 2006
- Mitini, 2002
- Badalpari, 2001
- Koseli, 1993

=== Awards ===
- Basudev-Bidhyadevi Luintel Guthi awards in 2016.

== Controversies ==
Panta was arrested on the alleged charge of sexually harassing a female security guard on September 17, 2016. The case was settled on mutual understanding between the accused and the victim in the presence of Chief District Officer.
