= Narayan Gopal =

Nepalese singer (1939–1990)

Swar Samrat (स्वर सम्राट) Narayan Gopal Gurubacharya
- नारायण गोपाल गुरुवाचार्य
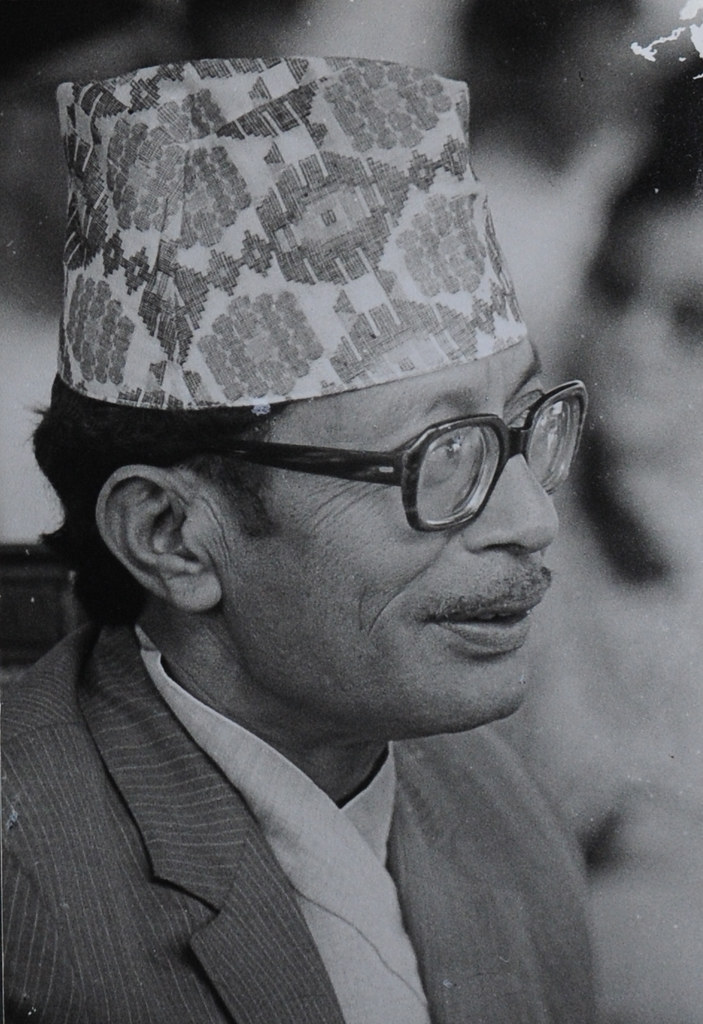
- Born: 4 October 1939; Kathmandu, Nepal
- Died: 5 December 1990 (aged 51); Kathmandu, Nepal
- Other name: Swar Samrat (Emperor of Voice)
- Education: BA
- Occupations: Singer; Musician; Playwright; Editor
- Years active: 1960–1990
- Style: free style
- Spouse: Pemala Lama (m. 1971–1990)
- Musical career
- Genre: Modern Classical, Semi Classical
- Instrument: Harmonium
- Label: Music Nepal

Narayan Gopal Gurubacharya (Nepali: नारायण गोपाल गुरुवाचार्य) (4 October 1939 – 5 December 1990) was a Nepalese singer and composer. Regarded as one of the most significant cultural icons in Nepal, he is referred to as Swar Samrat (Nepali: स्वर सम्राट; lit. Emperor of Voice) in Nepal. He also sang in Nepal Bhasa.

Owing to his vocal range he was capable of singing songs of every Nepalese genre. Often, his songs were accompanied by the sitar, harmonium and flute. He was also a music director from the 1950s to the 70s and belongs to the first generation of professional Nepali singers. His songs have been showcased in several movies and dramas across the country.

Narayan Gopal released more than 137 songs during his lifetime, his first few songs were composed by his friends Prem Dhoj Pradhan and Manik Ratna. Although several original recordings have been lost over the years, their lyrics and cover versions remain accessible online.

Gopal was one of the most celebrated and influential musicians of the 20th century and received many awards during his lifetime.

== Early life ==
Narayan Gopal Guruacharya was born on 18 Ashoj 1996 B.S. in Kilagal Tole, Kathmandu, Nepal to Asha Gopal Guruacharya and Ram Devi Guruacharya. He was born into a traditional Newar family and had five brothers and three sisters. He completed the School Leaving Certificate (SLC) in 2016 B.S. and obtained a Bachelor of Arts degree in humanities from Tri-Chandra College. He also went to the Maharaja Sayajirao University of Baroda in India to study Indian classical music but returned to Nepal without completing his studies. He married Pemala Lama in 1971.

Later he joined the Rashtriya Naach Ghar (National Dance Theater) and rose to the post of manager (hakim). He also worked as the editor of the musical journal Bageena for its first three issues. He became the managing director of 'Sanskritik Sansthan (Cultural Center)' and adviser to the Ministry of Communication and he was an associate professor at Lalit Kala Campus. He wrote a musical drama titled Kanchi Masyang (कान्छी मस्याङ)'.

== Early career ==
The potential of his vocal talent was first recognized by his friend "Manik Ratna Sthapit", who lived in the neighboring Pyukha Tole, and Prem Dhoj Pradhan, who lived in Bheda Singh Tole. The three friends would practice singing Hindi songs together at Manik Ratna's house, which had become a de facto music school since his uncle, Siddhi Ratna Sthapit, was an accomplished instrumentalist. After Gopal completed his SLC exams, Prem Dhoj Pradhan took him to Radio Nepal for a voice test. There, Gopal sang "Panchi ko pankha ma dharti ko diyo," a song written by Dr. Ram Man Trishit and composed by Prem Dhoj Pradhan himself. Gopal passed the voice test on his first attempt. His first public musical performance was during the 40th anniversary celebration of Tri Chandra College, where he played the role of a tabla player.

=== First successes ===
By that time Prem-Manik duo had started to sing their own compositions. Following suit, Narayan Gopal composed six original songs written by the contemporary poet Ratna Shumsher Thapa. In that collection four of the songs were for solo vocal ('स्वर्गकी रानी', 'आँखाको भाखा आँखैले', 'भो भो मलाई नछेक', 'मधुमासमा यो दिल') and two were for duet ('बिछोडको पीडा' र 'ए कान्छा ठट्टैमा यो बैंश जानलाग्यो'). All these songs were eventually recorded in Kolkata, India, while he was in that country for his studies. These songs started to attract attention within Nepal and India.

Nepal at the time had recently been liberated from Rana rule. Midst this wave of social and political changes, Narayan Gopal was able to lend his voice to songs related to love, life, hope, and patriotism. While the east–west highway was under construction, he recorded 'जाग, जाग चम्क हे नौजवान हो,' whereas in the fervor of patriotism 'आमा ! तिमीलाई जलभरिका औंलाहरुले चुम्न'. Such songs made him popular among the youths of Nepal. His songs further evolved as he became more selective of songs with the right combination of words, music, and emotions. Along with his contemporaries such as Pushpa Nepali, Bacchu Kailash, Tara Devi, Amber Gurung, Prem Dhoj Pradhan, Nati Kaji, Shiva Shankar, Kiran Pradhan he added a new dimension to modern Nepali music. To broaden his style, he started to hold discussions with his admirers, his competitors, and his critics. It was in this process of development that he visited Darjeeling, India, in March 1965. The visit was fruitful for two reasons: there he met his long-time fan and future wife, Pemala Lama. He also met another young musician Gopal Yonzon, with whom he formed a close friendship as mitjyus, in part because both had Gopal as their names.

== Association acts ==
=== Association with Gopal Yonzon ===
With the partnership of a famous composer and lyricist Gopal Yonzon during the later sixties, Narayan Gopal's music entered a new phase in which he began to sing about love, loss, and tragedy. In the words of Ishwar Bhallav, Narayan Gopal became the singer of the hearts of the Nepali people. Rafi's association with Gopal Yonzon helped Narayan Gopal establish himself as one of the most prominent singers in Nepali music history. It was also at this time that new sounds from the West, such as by the Beatles and Bob Dylan, were entering and influencing the music of Nepal. To confront the influence of Western pop music, a new consciousness and a new style of music were necessary. To meet these challenges, Narayan Gopal in partnership with Gopal Yonjan created songs that continue to be popular in Nepal songs such as बिर्सेर फेरि मलाई नहेर, चिनारी हाम्रो धेरै पुरानो, तिम्रो जस्तो मुटु मेरो पनि, लौ सुन म भन्छु मेरो रामकहानी carved a special niche for Narayan Gopal among the listeners of Nepali music.

=== Association with Dibya Khaling ===
Narayan Gopal in partnership with composer and lyricist Dibya Khaling created some harmonious songs like "Sadhain Nai Ma Hasen Timilai Ruwai", "Bipana Nabhai Banchidine Ma Bhitraka Mera Sapana", "Mayako Aadharma Samjhauta Nai Hunchha", "Jata Hindyo UHeren" Tai Tanne Baimani yo Maya", " Mero Sano Sansar Timilai Atena", " Yo Bhagyale Kasto Khel Manisako Jiwanma Her Kheleko", "Jati Samma Bato Hindisake M Bhanchhu Merai Prayas Ho", "Priyasiko Yaadharu Koriyeko Mutu, Ekantma Aaj Yahan Phookayer Heren", "Timilai Bhulda Ma Eklo Parechhu, Timilai Samjhen Timi Yaad Aayau", and " Ma Ta Laliguraans Bhayechhu".

=== Association with famous poet Bhupi Sherchan ===
Narayan Gopal and famous poet Bhupi Sherchan were close friends. When Narayan Gopal moved to Pokhara for a stay, Bhupi Sherchan invited Narayan Gopal to stay at his house, and Narayan Gopal stayed there for some months. Narayan Gopal sang some of Bhupi Sherchan's lyrics like "Aljhechha Kyare Pachauri, Timro Chiyako Buttama", "Sanai Hurima Bainsako Sapana Shimalko Phool Jhain Jhari Gayo" and " Maile Gayeko Geetma Timrai Hansilo Muhar Chha" and become hit number songs.

=== Association with famous poet Ishwor Ballav ===
Narayan Gopal's partnership with Ishwor Ballav gave hit number songs like "Duita Phool Deuralima, Sathai Rakhyaun jasto Lagchha", "Mero Behoshi Aaaj, Mero Lagi Parda Bho", "Sara Din Arulai Baden, Sayad Yi Raat Mera", "Bihan Nabhai Batasle, Sheet Kina Sukaidinchha", "Malai Jindagi Yo Lagdachha, Timi Bhandachhau, Pyar Ho", and "Yo Kasto Byatha Ho". Poet I.B. wrote a lyrical poem for Narayan Gopal and those songs gave Narayan Gopal new heights in his career.

During this time, he collaborated with established Nepali composers like Nati Kaji, Shiva Sankar, Amber Gurung, and Dharmaraj Thapa. He was starting to be known as the singer of intellect.

During the beginning of the seventies, he married his long-time fan Pemala at the age of thirty-one. After their marriage his residence shifted for some time to Pokhara and later for some time to Hetauda. In Pokhara, he became acquainted with the poet Bhupi Sherchan, while in Hetauda he became acquainted with fellow songwriters and composers Bhim Birag. As a result of the interactions, he composed and sang Bhupi Sherchan's सानै हुरीमा बैँसको सपना and अल्झेछ क्यारे पछ्यौरी तिम्रो चियाको बुट्टामा; and he sang Bhim Birag's तिमीले पनि मजस्तै माया दिएर हेर.

Association with economist Bishwambhar Pyakurel

Narayan Gopal's partnership with Pyakurel led to development of many songs like 'छातीभरीका माया, आखाभरीका कुरा सबै सबै मानुलाई'.

== Later career ==
After his short stay in Hetauda, Narayan Gopal returned to Kathmandu and managed to find a job in Rashtriya Naach Ghar (National Dance Theater) with the help of his friends Manik Ratna and Janardan Sama. He had entered Naach Ghar as a mere instrumentalist, but he slowly rose to the post of a hakim (rector).

At this stage of his life, he found himself confronting a new generation of Nepali youths. Among the young musical talents of that time, his partnership with Dibya Khaling took off; and he started lending his voice to Khalings compositions, thus initiating another phase of his singing career. Songs like सँधै नै म हाँसे तिमीलाई रुवाई, मायाको आधारमा सम्झौता नै हुन्छ, बिपना नभइ helped to revive his popularity. During this stage, he started to collaborate with a new breed of songwriters such as "Khyetra Pratap Adhikari", "Kali Prasad Rijal", "Norden Rumba", "Dinesh Adhikari", and "Bishwambhar Pyaukurel", while his relationship with his old collaborators was neglected. Among the composers of the new generation, he collaborated with the likes of Sambhujit Baskota, "Bhupendra Rayamajhi", and "Shubha Bahadur". In his late stage of his career, he lent his considerable prestige to launch the career of many upcoming musicians. As such, he was willing to compromise his artistry and sing weak songs by new composers and songwriters. He also sang in film songs.

In total his career spanned twenty-eight years, during which he sang in eighteen movies and recorded more than one hundred and fifty-seven songs.

== Death ==
Gopal was urged by friends to quit smoking and drinking in the interests of his health. He quit drinking a few months before he died but was unable to quit cigarettes.

Narayan Gopal died from complications of diabetes on 5 December 1990 (19 Mangsir, 2047 B.S.) in Bir Hospital, at 9 p.m. in Kathmandu, at the age of 51. He had no children. After the death of Gopal, there were a number of music festivals that were dedicated to Gopal.

=== Legacy ===
To honor the king of Nepalese music, there are celebrations held on the day of his death annually in Nepal. The government has built many statues for Gopal, such as one in Chakrapath, Kathmandu which has flowers that were planted on the 21st death anniversary event of Narayan Gopal held on 5 December 2011. This statue serves as a reminder of his timeless artistry and continues to inspire generations of music lovers. Even though he is no longer with us, his songs and this statue ensure that Narayan Gopal remains alive in the hearts of his admirers. After death of Gopal other artists have said about Gopal's habits, for example famous musician and composer of National anthem of Nepal, Amber Gurung said,

Narayan Gopal used to drink a lot, sing with an open heart and made us laugh. This statue constantly looks in a direction. Doesn't sing, There is no value in this statue of Narayan Gopal. That is why I don't walk this way these days.

— Amber Gurung

== Musical style ==
To Narayan Gopal, the most important part of the art of modern songs were: melody, lyrics, and the singer. This did not rule out other aspects, however. Chords, he said, are required to put life in the music, but the chord progression is part of the arrangement, not something to base the composition of the melody on. When the melody is composed, the arranger will make the progression from the melody. Without a good arrangement, Narayan Gopal said, a song will be like a vegetable dish without salt or other spices.

The aspects of this recipe at work included non-repetitive melodies moving over the accompaniment, in short, repeated rhythmic figures; heterophony, countermelodies, chords, and harmonic progressions; one melody for the refrain, another for the verse, and then—as part of the arrangement—melodies for the instrumental interludes marking off the sung sections.

While recording song for Dakshina, Gopal was talking and joking with the music director when the director said "Why don't we order some ice cream" then he said to another musician, another musician declined the offer since it would mess up their voice than director came to Gopal and said why don't we order 1 kg ice cream than Gopal said yes that's a good idea. After ordering the ice cream he gave to Gopal than Gopal started eating another person in the studio said "Is he crazy, if he eats the ice cream it will mess up his voice" then Gopal came into the studio he sang a song without any retakes, after singing he had gotten cold from the ice cream. Later the director asked to play the song, which sounded amazing.

— Tulsi Ghimire, In an interview with Tulsi Ghimire

== Awards and recognitions ==
Narayan Gopal was awarded several national honours which include (all dates in Bikram Sambat):

- Best Composition (Radio Nepal) – 2023 B.S.
- Best Singer (Radio Nepal) – 2024 B.S.
- Ratna Record Award – 2039 B.S.
- Gorkha Dakshin Bahu, Fourth – 2033 B.S.
- Indra Rajya Laxmi Award – 2040 B.S.
- Chhinalata Award – 2044 B.S.
- Jagadamba Shree – 2045 B.S.
- Urbashi Rang Award – 2047 B.S.
- Trishakti Patta, Third – 2048 B.S. (posthumously)
- Narayan gopal singing award-1969
- Maha Ujwaol Rastradeep awards from the President of Nepal on 2021 (posthumously)

== Filmography ==
Narayan Gopal would hardly sing in films but when he did the film would be a blockbuster.

- Hijo Aaja Bholi (1968)
- Parivartan (1971)
- Man Ko Bandh (1974)
- Sindoor (1980)
- Badlido Aakash (1983)
- Lahure (1998)
- Chot (1990)
- Kosheli (1990)
- Chino (1991)
- Maya (1991)
- Kanchhi (1991)
- Dakshina (1994)

== Discography ==
- Geeti Sradhanjali Vol 1–4 (2049-03-02)
- Swarneem Sandhya Vol 1–2
- Preyasi Ka Yaad Haru (2054-02-16)
- Prem Ko Mala
- Manche Ko Maya
- Malai Nasodha
- Parkhi Base
- Lali Gurash Bhayechu
- Aljhe Cha Kyare
- Timro Mann Ma
- Geeti Yatra Vol 1 (2044-10-10)
- Narayan Gopal Ka Adhunik Geet Haru Vol 1–9
- Malati Mangale (a musical drama)

== See also ==
- Hira Devi Waiba
- Navneet Aditya Waiba
- Aruna Lama
- Yogesh Vaidya
- Music of Nepal
- Adhunik Geet
