= Yogesh Vaidya =

Nepalese singer and musician (1946/1947 – 2024)

- Born: 1946/1947; Kathmandu, Nepal
- Died: 18 January 2024 (aged 77)
- Education: Santi Nikunja School (2016); ISC, Amrit science campus BSC, Tribhuwan College, MSC (Botany)Tribhuwan University; Master degree in food and nutrition, Ghent University, Belgium
- Occupations: Singer, musician

Yogesh Vaidya (Nepali: योगेश वैद्य; 1946/1947 – 18 January 2024) was a Nepalese singer and musician. He sang Nepali- and Newari-language songs. He is known as Muhammad Rafi of Nepal. His most popular songs include Sapana Bhulayee Saara, Mero Aanshumaa Nahanse and Nepal Mero Timilai Upahar Bhayo. Jai Namo Siri Buddha Bhagwan, Jimi Yahmah Thaun Jithay Wai are some of his popular Newari songs.

Vaidya was born at Nardevi of Kathmandu in 1946 to 1947. He worked in civil service and retired in 2005. He did his master's in food and nutrition from Ghent University of Belgium.

== Death ==
Vaidya died on 18 January 2024, at the age of 77. He had suffered from diabetes and had undergone a kidney transplant.

== Awards ==
- First prize in the National song conference
- Chhinnalata song award
- Mahila Geetkar Sangh lifetime achievement award in 2016
- Yogesh Vaidya received Pratisthan's lifetime award by Natya Sangit Pratisthan in 2018
- Bindabasini lifetime achievement awards in 2021
