= Aruna Lama =

Indian-born Nepali singer

- अरुणा लामा
- Born: 9 September 1945; Mungpoo, Darjeeling, British India
- Died: 4 February 1998 (aged 52); Kathmandu, Nepal
- Occupation: Singer
- Years active: 1952–1998
- Notable work: Pohor Saal Khusi, Eh Kancha Malai Sunko Tara
- Title: Nightingale of the Hills
- Spouse: Saran Pradhan (m. 1963; died 1974)
- Children: 2
- Awards: Prabala Gorkha Dakshina Bahu (1996)

Aruna Lama (9 September 1945 – 4 February 1998) was an Indian-born Nepali language singer from Darjeeling. She is popularly known as 'Nightingale of the Hills'. She sang hundreds of Nepali songs, including some for Nepali film, and left an indelible mark as one of the best singers in Nepali music.

== Biography ==
Lama was born on 9 September 1945 at Ghoom Pahar, Darjeeling, British India to Nepali parents Surya Bahadur Lama and Sanmaya Lama. Her uncle C.B. Lama inspired her to sing from the age of 7. She won a music competition organized by the Gorkha Dukha Niwarak Sammelan (GDNS) in 1956 at the age of 11 and then she never looked back. Amber Gurung, one of the stalwarts of Nepali music, groomed her in singing from 1958. Aruna Lama did her schooling at Mungpoo Primary School, Jalpahar, and St. Teresa's School, Darjeeling. She completed her graduate degree in arts from Darjeeling Government College.

In 1963, Aruna Lama married Saran Pradhan, another Nepali musician. In 1974, her husband died and she was left with her two children, Sapna (Pradhan) Thapa and Supreet Raj Pradhan. She worked hard to raise them, working as an assistant teacher in St. Alphonsus School (1965) and finally found work at the Scheduled Castes and Tribes Welfare Office in Darjeeling where she worked till 1998. She continued to sing even with all her struggles till the end of her life.

== Music ==
Aruna Lama sang for numerous music composers, most notably Amber Gurung, Karma Yonzon, Gopal Yonzon, Shanti Thatal, Narayan Gopal, Mani Kamal Chettri and Dibya Khaling. Her first song was composed by Amber Gurung and the lyrics was written by Bhupi Sherchan in 1961. Some of her classic hits are Eh Kancha Malai Sunko Tara, Phool Lai Sodhey, Pohor Saal Khusi Phatda, Hera Na Hera Kancha, Laharey Bara Ghumauney Chautari, Eklai Basda and Nepali Gaurav Garchau Afnaipanma. She also sang for a number of Nepali films, such as Maitighar, Paral Ko Aago and Kanchhi, these film songs are remembered even today. Some of her notable musical performances include Raag Rajat at Gorkha Rangamanch, Darjeeling 1981; Arunanjali at Pragya Bhawan, Kathmandu; and Aruna Lama Swarnim Saanjh at Pragya Bhawan, Kathmandu.

== Awards ==
Aruna Lama received numerous awards both in Nepal and India for her singing and contribution to Nepali music.

Some of these awards include:

- Sangit Puraskar (1966)
- Sur Sringar Sammelan Puraskar (1966)
- Mitrasen Puraskar (Assam Nepali Sahitya /Sanskritik Parishad 1975)
- Dishari Puraskar (Kolkata 1980)
- Bhanu Academy Puraskar (Darjeeling 1982)
- Nepali Chalchitra Puraskar (for Maitighar 1983)
- Chinnlata Geet Puraskar (Kathmandu 1992)
- Urvashi Rang Puraskar (Kathmandu 1992)
- Mitrasen Sangeet Puraskar (Gangtok 1995)
- Gorkha Dakshina Bahu 4th (Kathmandu 1996)
- Sadhna Puraskar (Kathmandu)

Lama has also bee honoured with various titles such as 'Nightingale of the Hills' (Hindustan Recording Sangsthan, Kolkata), 'Swar Kinnari' (Sitaram Sahitya Pratisthan, Kathmandu) and 'Swar Samagri' (Arunanjali Programme, Kathmandu).

== Selected songs ==
- Phool Lai
- Pohor Saal Khusi Phatyo
- Nepali Gaurav Garchau Afnaipanma
- Manma Timro
- Hanga Hanga
- Aankhama Mero
- Udas Mero
- Chautarima Basera
- Eklai Basda
- Sabaile Bhanthe
- Hera Na Hera Kancha
- Aankhaharule
- Laharey Bara Ghumauney Chautari
- Udi Jaaun Bhane Panchi Hoina (Movie: Paral Ko Aago)
- Himal Sari Ma (Movie: Kanchhi)
- Yee Timra Muskan (Movie: Kanchhi)
- Kala Kala Sala Sala (Movie: Kanchhi)

== See also ==
- Hira Devi Waiba
- Narayan Gopal
- Shanti Thatal
