= Chino (1989 film) =

- Theatrical Release Poster
- Nepali: चिनो
- Directed by: Tulsi Ghimire
- Story by: Tulsi Ghimire
- Produced by: Om Trinetra Production
- Starring: Shiv Shrestha; Bhuwan K.C. Sunil Thapa; Sharmila Malla; Shrawan Ghimire; Tulsi Ghimire
- Cinematography: Pramod Pradhan
- Edited by: Tulsi Ghimire
- Music by: Ranjit Gazmer
- Release date: 15 January 1989
- Running time: 2h 37m
- Country: Nepal
- Language: Nepali

Chino (Nepali: चिनो, English: Souvenir) is a Nepali action drama film written and directed by Tulsi Ghimire. The film featured an ensemble cast of Shiva Shrestha, Bhuwan K.C., Sunil Thapa, Kristi Mainali, Sharmila Malla, Subhadra Adhikari, Shravan Ghimire, Sinaura Mistry, Anoop Malla and Sushila Raymajhi. The film is a revenge story of two brothers played by( played by Shiva Shrestha and Bhuwan K.C.) who are separated after their parents were killed by a criminal Rate Kaila (Sunil Thapa). How they reunite and find the reason why their parents were killed and take revenge forms the rest of the story. The film was shot entirely in Nepal.

The film was released with positive response from critics and audience with praise directed towards its screenplay, performance of actors especially Shiva Shrestha and Sunil Thapa and chartbuster music. The film was a massive blockbuster at the box office and went on to become the highest grossing Nepali film of 1990's and second highest grossing Nepali film of all time after Kusume Rumal (another Tulsi Ghimire film) and is considered to be one of the most commercially successful films in the history of Nepali cinema. The songs of the film with music by Ranjit Gazmer were highly popular especially Mohani Lagla Hai remaining popular till today, and Batasa Le Udai Lyayo was also a chartbuster at that time. The film is considered to be one of the best Nepali films ever made and remains cult classic.

== Film ==
The film begins with the villain Rate Kaila (Sunil Thapa) being released from jail after four years. He subsequently searches for Laxmi (Subhadra Adhikari), who got married and had two children while Rate was in Jail. During a Tihar celebration at Laxmi's house, Rate finds her and confronts her. After a heavy altercation, Rate kills Laxmi's husband. Laxmi takes her two children, sets the house on fire, and flees the scene. While fleeing from Rate, one of the children is flung into the river. Rate thinks that Laxmi was killed in the River while fleeing. Rate's son is later found by Bau (Tulsi Ghimire) and taken to Gumba to ascertain whether he is alive or not. The monk in Gumba performs a series of rituals over the child and saves him. Since no one opts to take in the child, Bau decides to adopt it. Bau's girlfriend, however, is against him adopting the child, resulting in their breakup. Laxmi returns home and collects her husband's ashes. She decides not to perform the death rituals for her husband until Rate is killed. The film follows the two children as they grow up and plan to kill Rate as revenge for their mother's sake.

== Cast ==
- Shiv Shrestha as Birkhe
- Bhuwan K.C. as Hemant
- Sunil Thapa as Rate Kaila
- Shuvardra Adhikari as Laxmi
- Kristi Mainali as Pooja
- Sharmila Malla as Juneli
- Sinaura Mistri as Doma
- Aaron Malla as young Hemant
- Shrawan Ghimire as Pradeep
- Ramchandra Adhikari as Shambu
- Jitendra Mahat Abhilasi as Man Bahadur
- Tulsi Ghimire as Bau
- B. S Rana as Pooja father
- Ram Chandra Adhikari as supporting actor
- Keshab Bhattarai as Laxmi's husband, father of Hemant and Birke (special appearance)

== Soundtrack ==
No.	Title	Singer(s)	Length
1.	"Batasale Udai Lyayo"	Kumar Kancha, Asha Bhosle	3:41
2.	"Diyo Bali"	Asha Bhosle	3:38
3.	"Janmera Kokhama"	Narayan Gopal	4:59
4.	"Maya Ta Maya Ho"	Narayan Gopal, Asha Bhosle	4:29
5.	"Mohani Lagla Hai"	Narayan Gopal, Asha Bhosle	6:18
Total length:			21:85
