= Prem Dhoj Pradhan =

Nepalese musician (1938–2021)

Prem Dhoj Pradhan प्रेमध्वज प्रधान
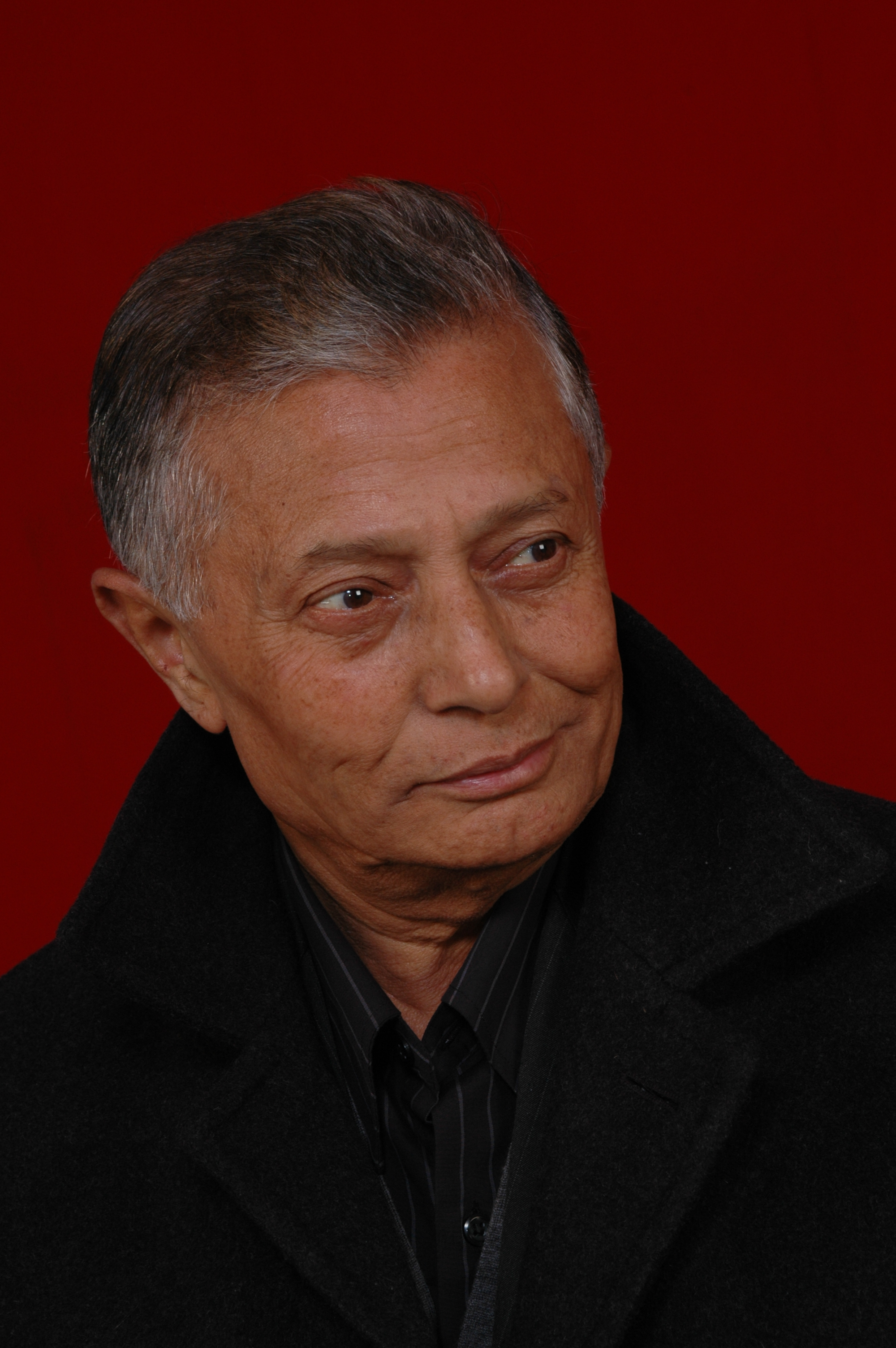
- Pradhan in 2008

Background information
- Born: Prem Dhoj Pradhan; 6 June 1938; Chautara, Nepal
- Died: 6 May 2021 (age 82) Sundhara, Kathmandu
- Genres: Classical; semi-classical
- Instruments: Vocals; Harmonium; Guitar; Tabla; Madal; Piano
- Years active: 1944–2021
- Website: Official website

Prem Dhoj Pradhan (6 June 1938 – 6 May 2021) was a Nepalese musician. He was a singer, composer, and regional playback singer who sang in the two major languages of Nepal, Newa and Nepali. He was also known as the Golden Voice and King of Romantic Melodies of Nepal.

Pradhan was the first musician to perform with a guitar in Nepal, the First to perform solo concerts, and the first Nepali singer to sing with Indian playback singer Usha Mangeshkar for the movie Maitighar in 1965. In 1985, he sang duet songs with Asha Bhosle for the movie Mayalu in Bombay, India. Pradhan varied his musical style throughout his career and recorded approximately more than 700 songs in both languages combined on Radio Nepal, including live broadcasting and recorded songs.

== Early life ==
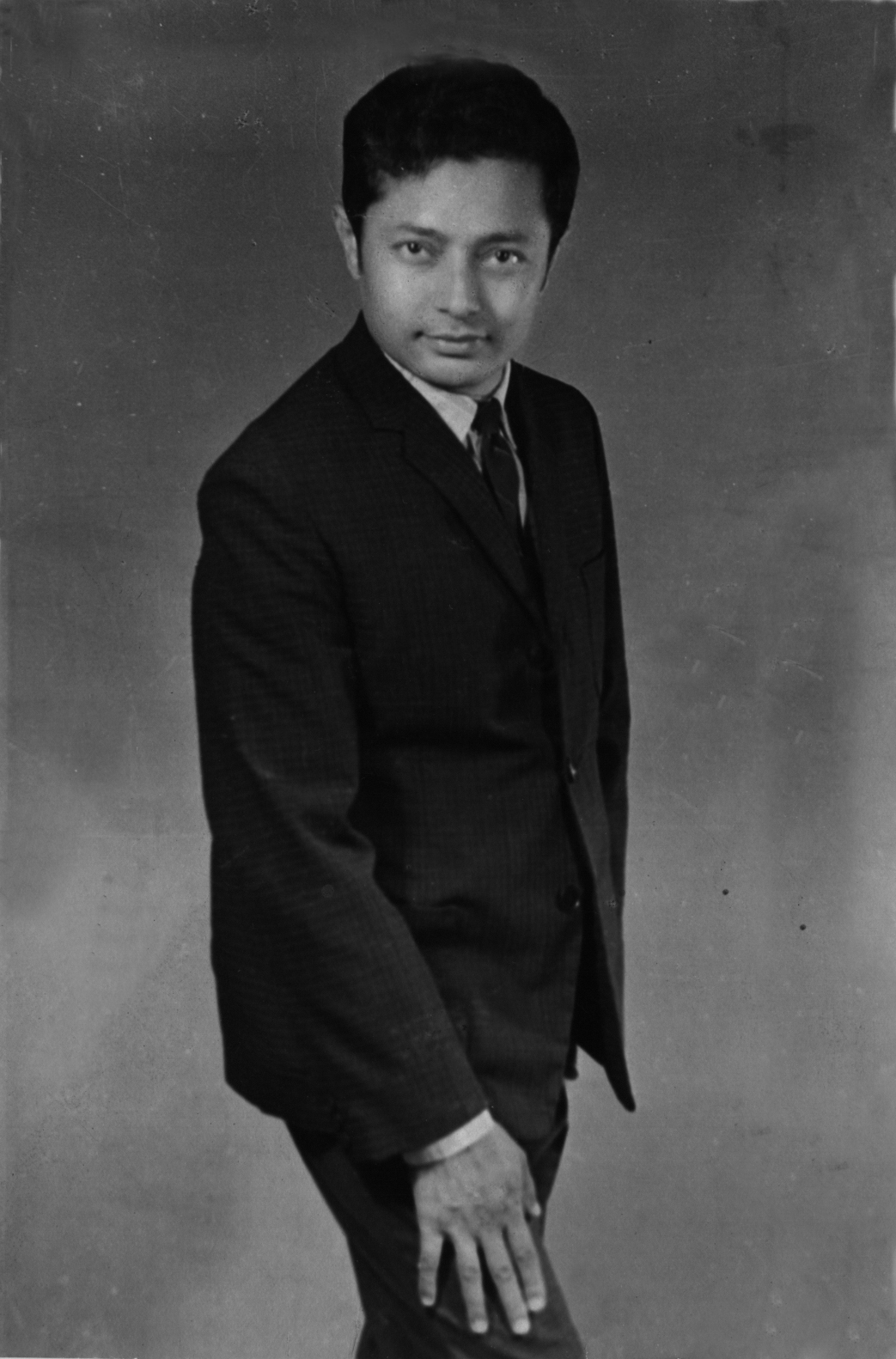
Pradhan in his youth

Prem Dhoj Pradhan was born on 6 June 1938, in Chautara, a small town 28 miles east of Kathmandu, to Ratna Dhoj Pradhan, a businessman, and Pran Devi Pradhan, a musician.

Pradhan's parents separated when he was young, and he went on to be raised by his mother and her family, who imbued in him a love of music. His mother was a talented performer and taught him about music. He also tells the story of listening to classical music for an hour every night with his grandfather at a time when the radio was banned for ordinary Nepalese.

He received a Bachelor of Arts in 1967 from Saraswati Multiple Campus, Tribhuvan University, Nepal.

== Musical career ==
=== 1950s ===
Pradhan's music career began in 1952 when he attended a voice test at Radio Nepal. The station, which was once permitted only to broadcast political information, began serving in the early 1950s as a platform for Nepali artists like Pradhan, allowing them to sing two songs every month.

Two years later, starting in 1954, Pradhan spent fifteen months studying with the late Ganesh Lal Shrestha. He also, around this time, started performing in Kathmandu with a group of eight other musicians, becoming the first group in the country to perform concerts. And in 1957, together with Tara Devi, he became the first Nepali singer to record a song for Radio Nepal, as opposed to playing live.

=== 1960s ===
In 1961, Pradhan had to stop singing for two years after undergoing surgery to remove a non-malignant polyp in his left vocal cord. During the hiatus, he adopted the guitar as part of his new style, becoming the first Nepali singer to do so. He began performing again later that year, and he was awarded a prize for the best voice in the All Nepal Modern Songs Competition in 1963 for "Goreto Tyo Gaunko".

After mastering his signature style, he released his first LP records in the autumn of 1963. By the end of 1969, he had recorded 32 songs.

Unable to find a sponsor, Pradhan personally funded eleven out of his sixteen discs. Towards the end of 1964, he recorded eight songs in Nepali and six in Newari.

In November 1965, he was invited by Jaidev to sing with Usha Mangeshkar for the Nepali film, Maiti Ghar.

=== 1970s ===
In 1970, in his own music composition, he recorded ten Nepali songs in an album titled Himalayan Bouquet from Swinging Kathmandu. In the same year he also recorded bhajan songs (six pieces) under Jaidev.

== Death ==
Pradhan died on 6 May 2021, at Neuro and General Hospital, Sundhara, Kathmandu, after being hospitalized with breathing problems and chest pain.

== Honours and awards ==
1. Received Narayan Gopal Sangeet Samman from Lunkaran-Ganga CSKM, November 2002
2. Felicitated by Nepal Music Welfare Fund for significant contribution to Nepalese music
