= Amber Gurung =

Nepali musician (1938–2016)

Shree Amber Gurung
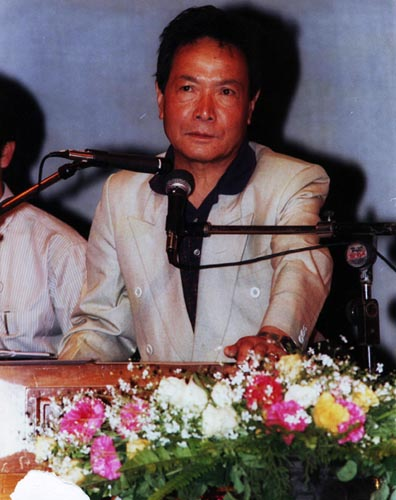
- Born: 26 February 1938; Darjeeling, India
- Died: 7 June 2016 (aged 78); Grande Hospital, Kathmandu, Nepal
- Occupations: Composer, singer, lyricist
- Writing career
- Language: Nepali language and Gurung
- Website: ambergurung.com

Shree Amber Gurung (Nepali: अम्बर गुरुङ) (26 February 1938 – 7 June 2016) was a Nepalese composer, singer, and lyricist better known for composing the National anthem of Nepal, "Sayaun Thunga Phulka".

== Early life ==
Amber Gurung was born in Darjeeling, India, where his father and former soldier in the British Indian Army, Ujir Singh Gurung, from Gorkha district, Nepal, served as a policeman . His mother encouraged him to sing and compose as a child, and he taught himself to play Nepali, Chinese , and Western instruments. He studied at Turnbull School, Darjeeling, where he fell in love with music while singing Bible Hymns.

== Career ==
In the 1950s, he formed an association with Nepali poet Agam Singh Giri. He has written over 100 song. He became the headmaster of Bhanu Bhakta School, founded by Giri, and pioneered the Art Academy of Music. He recorded his most famous song "Nau Lakh Tara" (a song about the sufferings of the Nepali diaspora in India) in the early 1960s, written by Giri. His students included musicians and singers such as Karma Yonzon, Aruna Lama, Sharan Pradhan, Peter Karthak, Indra Gajmer, Jitendra Bardewa, Suraj Kumar Thapa, and Ranjit Gazmer. He worked as the Music Chief of Folk Entertainment Unit, Government of West Bengal, Darjeeling from 1962 to 1965. He was barred from singing or recording songs outside the unit. He later moved and settled in Kathmandu, Nepal, in 1969.

On 1 January 2014, he was given the title "Mahan Sangeetkar" by Himalayan Tones Music Academy of Hong Kong. Organizing "Amber Gurung Ratri", Dinesh Subba. Gurung composed Nepal's new national anthem, Sayaun Thunga Phulka in 2007. He was invited by Nepal's King Mahendra to return to Nepal to establish and chair the music department of the newly founded Nepal Academy of Arts in 1968, where he served as music director for nearly 30 years. He was appointed the founding chancellor of Nepal Academy of Music and Drama in 2010.

== Death ==
Amber Gurung died on 7 June 2016 at the age of 78. At the time, he was suffering from diabetes and Parkinson's disease.
