= Gopal Yonzon =

Indian singer and composer known for his work in Nepali music

Gopal Yonjan
- Born: 26 August 1943; Darjeeling, Bengal Presidency, British India
- Died: 20 May 1997 (aged 53) Delhi, India
- Genre: Modern music
- Occupations: Singer, musician, playwright, editor
- Instrument: Vocal
- Years active: 1960–1990

Gopal Yonzon, also spelled Gopal Yonjan, (26 August 1943 – 20 May 1997) was an Indian lyricist, singer, and composer. He was known for his patriotic Nepali songs. His voice range allowed him to sing songs of every genre of Nepalese music. He belongs to the first generation of Nepali singers who became professional singers. His songs have also been used in several movies and dramas across the country.

Gopal dedicated his entire life to creating music. He spent years researching and studying Nepali folk and traditional as well as Indian, in particular Rabindra Sangeet and Newari classical music. His compositions reflect this deep innate bond that he believed would touch a common cord around the world transcending man made barriers and boundaries. His compositions are not confined to any form or type.

Gopal started his musical career as a flautist. He wrote his first lyrics in 1963 and his first musical composition was recorded in 1964. His musical works encompass nationalistic/patriotic, spiritual, romantic, philosophical, dancing tunes, ballads, musical compositions, ode to women and womanhood, songs for children and youth and thematic songs on environment, sports, scouts, etc. The list is endless. His renderings range from purely classical to folk, modern and music specially created for women and children. In all this variety he maintains his sensitivity and finesse in captivating and maintaining the Nepali touch.

== Personal life ==
Gopal Yonjan was born into a Tamang family in Darjeeling, Bengal Presidency, British India, on 26 August 1943 (10 Bhadra, 2000 B.S.). He moved to Nepal from Darjeeling for his MA in Nepali language. He married his wife Renchin in 1968. Gopal Yonjan died in Delhi, India at the age of 53. He has one daughter and two sons.

== Association with various artists ==
Gopal Yonjan has been bestowed the title of "Sangeet Samrat" (Emperor of Music), "Bagyeyakar" (Master of lyrics, music and voice) by Nepali music practitioners and audiences. As a composer he believed in encouraging a love and passion for music and was responsible for introducing many new artistes to the musical world. Singers such as Udit Narayan Jha, who later became a singing star of Bollywood, Narayan Gopal who is regarded as Swar Samrat (Voice Emperor), Meera Rana, Kiran Pradhan, Indira Maskey and a host of other singers were all groomed and coached by him. In fact the music fraternity regard his teaming with Narayan Gopal as singer as the Golden Era of Nepali music.

To Nepali audiences, Gopal Yonjan is synonymous with Patriotic songs filled with love for his country Nepal. Gopal was a peace-loving man and respected the spirit of the Himalaya and the Nepali.

Gopal dedicated his entire life to creating music. He spent years researching and studying Nepali folk and traditional as well as Indian, in particular Rabindra Sangeet and Newari classical music. His compositions reflect this deep innate bond that he believed would touch a common cord around the world transcending man made barriers and boundaries. His compositions are not confined to any form or type.

Gopal Yonjan died in May 1997 before he could record and document his innumerable compositions. Institutions such as Radio Nepal and the Police Club for which he composed at least 10 musical songs and pieces annually for 20 years have not preserved or archived many of his compositions. Many recorded works are missing and those that remain show that today's technological benefits could be utilised to create a data bank of Gopal Yonjan's musical works.

Gopal started his musical career as a flautist. He wrote his first lyrics in 1963 and his first musical composition was recorded in 1964. His musical works encompass Nationalistic/Patriotic, Spiritual, Romantic, Philosophical, Dancing Tunes, Ballads, Musical compositions, Ode to Women and Womanhood, songs for children and youth and thematic songs on environment, sports, scouts, etc. The list is endless. His renderings range from purely classical to folk, modern and music specially created for women and children. In all this variety he maintains his sensitivity and finesse in captivating and maintaining the Nepali touch.

== Honors ==
- (Nepal) Order of Gorkha Dakshina Bahu III (1994)
- Coronation Medal of Nepal (1974)

== Awards and recognitions ==
- Best Musician – Flautist (Darjeeling) (1962)
- Best Musician – Flautist (Darjeeling) (1963)
- Best Musician – Flautist (Darjeeling) (1964)
- Best Music Director (Darjeeling) (1965)
- Best Music Director (Darjeeling) (1966)
- Best Music Director (Darjeeling) (1967)
- Radio Nepal Gold Medal for Best Music Director/Composer (Nepal) (1968)
- Lions Club Award for Best Music Director (Nepal) (1986)
- Best Music Director Nepal by Royal Nepal Film Corporation (1988)
- Urvashi Award for Best Music Director (Nepal) (1990)
- Chinnalata Award for Outstanding Contribution to Nepali Music (1992)
- Priya Award for 25 years dedicated outstanding contribution to Nepali music (1995)

== Publications ==
=== Author ===
- Sangeetanjali – Music Course Book for Intermediate College
- Geet Manjari – Book & Tape for songs for children up to the age of 10

=== Contributor ===
- Music & Dance Section of the Rough Guide on Nepal by David Reed

=== Editor ===
- BAAGINA Publication: BAA for Baja ('music'), GI for Geet ('song'), NA for Naach ('dance')
