= Culture of Bengaluru =

Bengaluru is the capital and largest city of the Indian state of Karnataka. With a population of over 15 million (as of January 2016), Bengaluru is the third largest city in India and 27th largest city in the world. Bengaluru is one of the most ethnically diverse cities in the country, with over 51% of the city's population being migrants from other parts of India. Historically a multicultural city, Bengaluru has experienced a dramatic social and cultural change with the advent of the liberalization and expansion of the information technology and business process outsourcing industries in India. IT companies in Bangalore employ over 35% of India's pool of 1 million IT professionals.

== Garden City ==
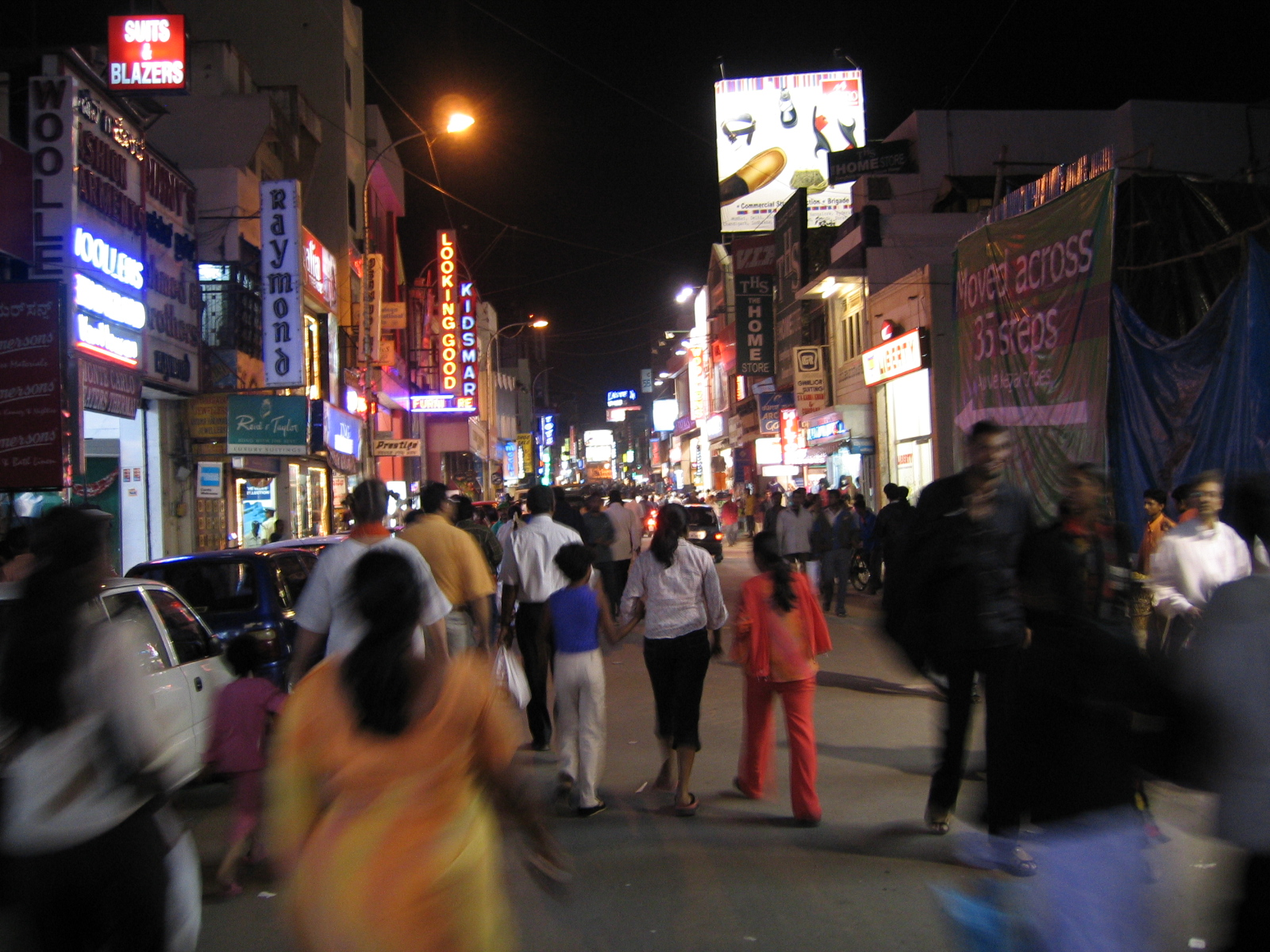
Commercial Street is an important commercial area in Bangalore

Bangalore is known as the Garden City of India and has two nationally recognized botanical gardens – Lal Bagh and Cubbon Park. The city was the recipient of the Indira Priyadarshini Vruksha Mitra award in the late 1980s, in recognition of its extensive green cover. Bannerghatta Zoo is also filled with green landscape.

== Religion ==
One of the major religions of Bengaluru is Hinduism. The city celebrates what is known to be Bengaluru's oldest festival called "Karaga Shaktyotsava". Deepavali, the "Festival of Lights", is observed by members of various faiths and demographics. Dasara, a traditional celebratory hallmark of the old Kingdom of Mysuru is another important festival. Other traditional Indian festivals such as Ganesh Chaturthi, Ugadi, Sankranthi are also celebrated.

Eid ul-Fitr, Eid ul-Azha and Christmas are also reportedly celebrated by the Muslim and Christian population respectively.

== Entertainment ==
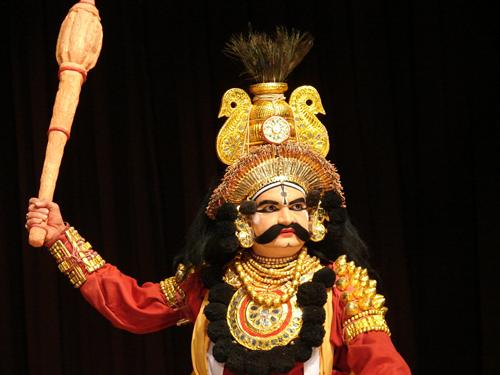
Yakshagana – a theatre art is often played in town hall

Bangalore is home to the Kannada film industry which produces around 100 movies each year, making it the fifth largest movie industry in India by revenue. The Kannada Movie Industry has spawned a different colloquial type variety altogether, commonly referred to as Bangalore Kannada.

Bangalore is also known as the Ham Radio Capital of India because of the number of Amateur (Ham) Radio licence holders and their activities. Bangalore has nearly twenty Amateur (Ham) Radio Clubs and four VHF Repeaters. Bangalore Amateur Radio Club VU2ARC started in the year 1959 celebrating its Golden Jubilee – 50th Year. Lions Clubs International Amateur (Ham) Radio Club VU2LCI has its base here.

== Food ==
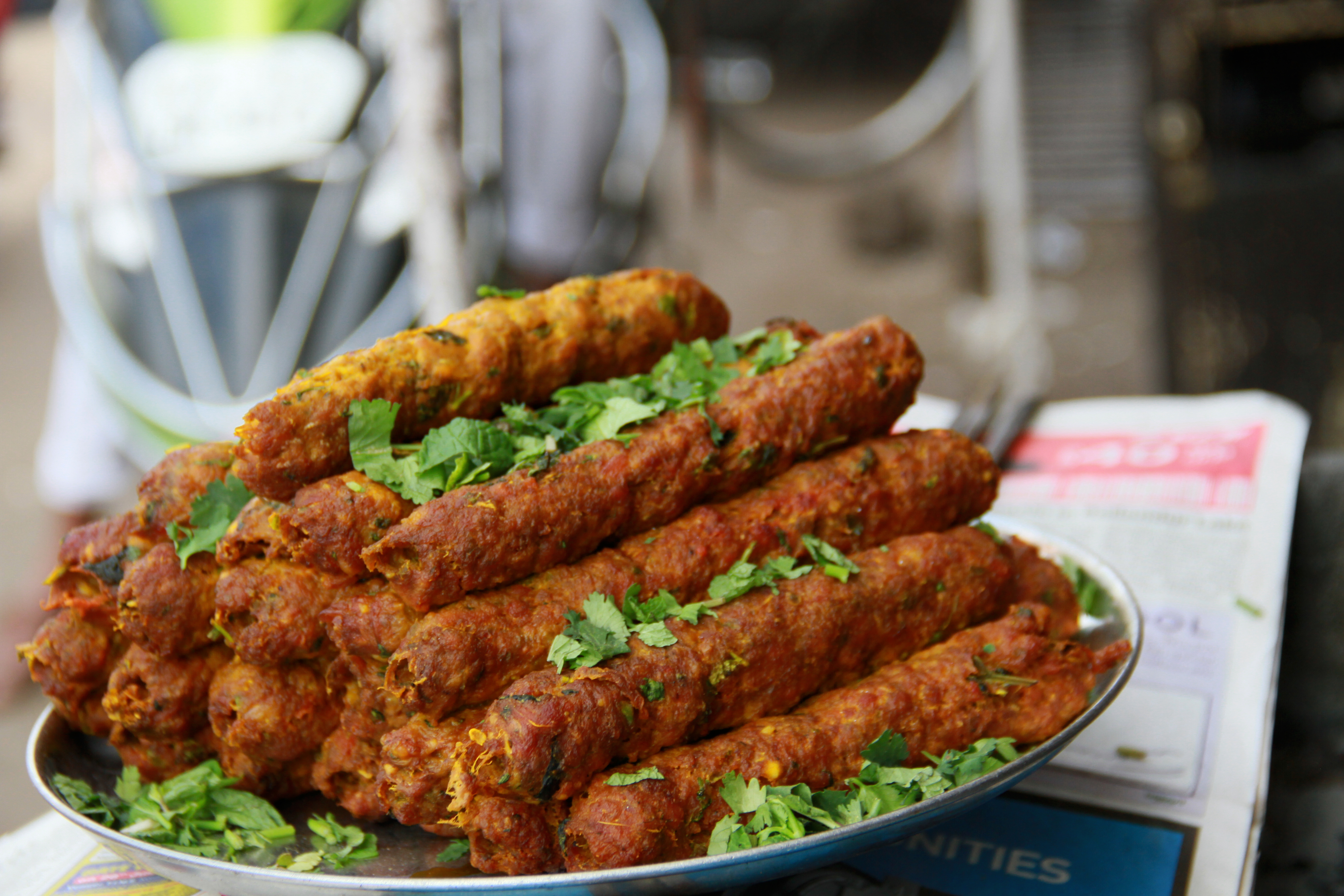
Ready to eat Kebab on the roadside food joints, in Shivajinagar.

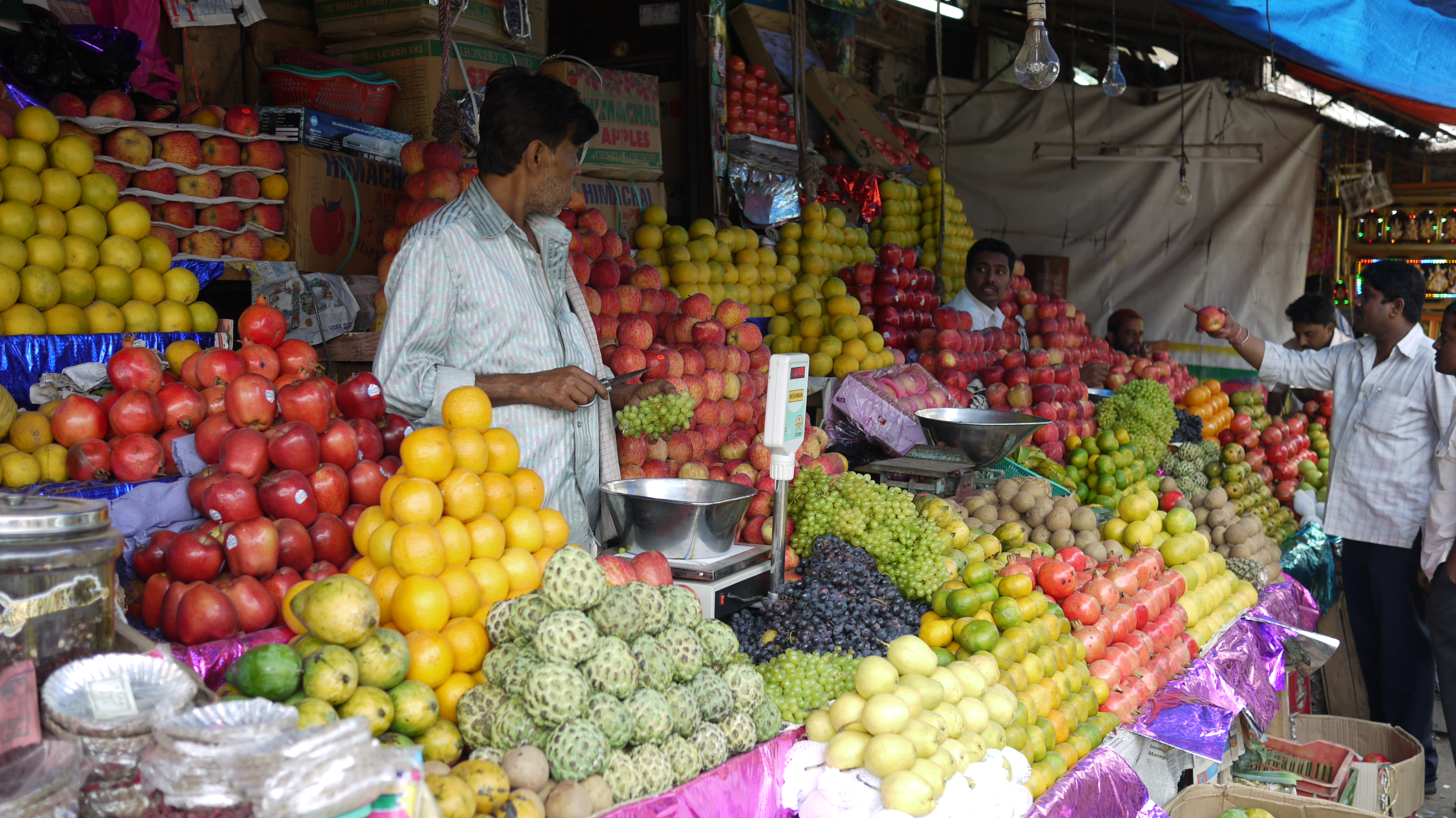
A market in Bangalore.

Food is sold in the city by roadside vendors, tea stalls. South Indian, North Indian, Arabic food, Chinese and Western fast food are common, modified to cater to the local palate, as are Udupi restaurants which serve predominantly vegetarian cuisine.

The masala dose – rice pancake smeared with red chilli chutney and stuffed with potato curry, 'set dose' – 3 medium-sized doses, 'benne masalae' – thick rice pancake prepared with butter – originated in the city. Bisi bele bath, Rava idli, Pongal, the spicy Uppittu – served as Khara Bath in most of the restaurants are some of the other local favourites. The Udipis or the South Indian restaurant/cafes are known for their filter coffee. Other restaurants include Italian, and others selling Mangalore and Konkan style seafood.

The Muslim cuisine of Bangalore combines Mughlai cuisine, Hyderabadi Muslim with local dishes and ingredients. The MM Road in Fraser Town hosts several of these restaurants. The Chandni Chowk area of Shivajinagar also has a concentration of tightly packed restaurants and tea shops. Dishes often sold in these restaurants include Tandoori Chicken, Bangalore Biriyani, Gundu Palav, Sheek kebabs, Sheek Rolls, Chicken kebabs, Rumali Rotis and lots more. VV Puram Food Street specialises in Indian and Karnataka dishes.

Arabian cuisine, including Shawarma and Falafel are sold in hotels, primarily to Arab students and Indians who have lived in the Middle East. Fine dining are also offered in several of the expensive hotels in the city. Roadside stalls typically sell dishes such as barbecued beef sheek kebab and a local Bangalore recipe Phaal, beef cubes in spicy green masala, served with hot Rice Sevian (Plain steamed Vermicelli). Other eateries include bakeries, fruit juice stalls, and dessert shops.

== Music ==
Historically, some Bangalore musicians have worked in the Carnatic and Hindustani traditions. Notable musicians from the city include Purandara Dasa (the father of Carnatic music), Tyagraja, Kalakkad Subbiah Ramanarayanan Iyer, Dr Nithyasree Mahadevan, Gingger Shankar, Basavaraj Rajguru, and Gangubai Hangal.

Modern musicians include Lucky Ali, Jim Ankan Deka, Bapu Padmanabha, Pravin Godkhindi, Shimoga Subbanna, Mysore Ananthaswamy, P. Kalinga Rao, Bangalore Latha, G. V. Atri, C. Ashwath and Balappa Hukkeri.

The Bangalore music scene consists of a far cry of different genres, from international music to traditional folk songs. Janapadhas are the traditional folk songs in the historic culture of Karnataka. The vast number of different people living in Bangalore hailing from different places developed a distinct style of music. Kannada film music is heard playing in auto rickshaws, shops, and the streets. The party and the nightlife scenario experiences a different type of music, most popular international numbers varying in genres from Trance, Pop, Indi-pop, and Hip-Hop, Bollywood music is less dominant.

Though Bangalore is a hub for both classical and contemporary music, the dominant music genre in urban Bangalore is rock music. All sub-genres of rock, varying from classic rock n' roll to extreme metal can be heard in Bangalore. The underground scenario in Bangalore is often acclaimed and hence lead to the city being called Rock/Metal capital of India. Rock 'n India, Freedom Jam is the pioneer made in Bangalore 'Woodstock' style annual festival offering different genres of live music regularly at various venues all over the city. The 22nd edition of this 'Free Music Festival' was held during the Independence weekend this August 2017. Sunday Jams, the monthly smaller versions, on the first Sunday of every month, have been going on too.[www.freedomjam.in & FB page.] Great Indian Rock, Deccan Rock and Summer Storm Festival are the primitive (?) rock festivals in India. GIR primarily a Delhi event organised by RSJ magazine is not heard of now while DR and SS are defunct. In early 2012, the Bangalore Open Air metal festival (powered by Wacken Open Air festival), to be headlined by Iced Earth and Kreator, and to be held on 16 June was announced. NH7, which ran for a few years seems to have abandoned the city. Bangalore was also the first city in India where internationally popular rock groups Metallica, Iron Maiden, The Rolling Stones, Bryan Adams, Scorpions, Sting, Aerosmith, Elton John, Deep Purple among various other heavy metal groups performed live for the first time in India. However, after the Santana concert about seven years ago, there has hardly been any big international rock acts performing in the city. A few extreme metal or cult alternative acts have occasionally catered to a niche audience. In fact, EDM acts rule Bangalore's high priced concert scene while Bollywood music performed live is as popular as ever.

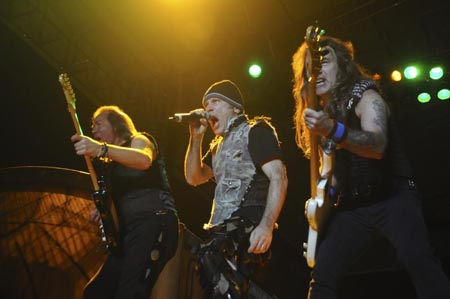
Heavy metal group Iron Maiden performing in Bangalore

Various international musicians have performed in Bangalore, including Bryan Adams, Jethro Tull, Iron Maiden, Lamb of God, Flo Rida and Poets of the Fall.

=== Music schools in Bangalore ===
The recent past has also seen a significant growth in the number of music institutes providing training for vocal and various instruments including guitar, piano, keyboard, veena, sitar, tabla, sitar, organ etc. in Carnatic, Hindustani classical, Popular music and Western music, especially in Bangalore city. PRISM Foundation, in Rajajinagar, The Bangalore School of Music in RT Nagar, Eastern Fare Music Foundation in Koramangala, Sumadhura Education and Cultural Trust in Vijaynagara, Shreepada Sangeeta Kala Kendra in Bannerghatta Road and World Music Centre in Malleswaram are some of the institutes who have successfully endorsed Music as a serious business or career option as opposed to its familiar perception as a pastime or hobby. Apart from the formal training, these institutes offer courses that enable learners to appear for many recognized certificate and diploma examinations.

== Sport ==
Cricket is the most popular sport in Bangalore(it has its own IPL team RCB or Royal Challengers Bangalore and has a huge fan following) though it has lost some of its popularity in a small amount of time to football, basketball and tennis. English football clubs Manchester United, Liverpool F.C, and popular French club Paris Saint Germain have a large number of supporters in the city. Bengaluru FC is a football club based in Bangalore and was formed in 2013. The club, which originally participated in the I-League, now plays in the Indian Super League.

Significant numbers of India's national cricket team have come from Bangalore, including Gundappa Viswanath, Rahul Dravid, Venkatesh Prasad, Anil Kumble, Erapalli Prasanna, Robin Uthappa, B.S. Chandrashekar, Syed Kirmani, Brijesh Patel, Roger Binny, Sadanand Vishwanath, K. L. Rahul, Karun Nair and Vinay Kumar. Many of the city's children play Gully cricket and football on the roads and in the city's many public fields. Bangalore's main international cricket stadium is the M. Chinnaswamy Stadium, which hosted its first match in 1974 and was the venue for the India-Pakistan cricket quarter-final during World Cup 1996. International cricket was played at the Central College grounds before moving to the current venue.

Other famous sportspersons from Bangalore include badminton player and former All England Badminton Championship winner Prakash Padukone, tennis player and 10-time Grand Slam winner Mahesh Bhupathi, cueist Pankaj Advani and athlete Ashwini Nachappa.

== Education ==
Bangalore is home to some of the top colonial-era schools in India including Bishop Cottons Boys' and Girls' School, Baldwin's High School, Sophia High School, and St. Josephs. Some of the top international schools are also located in Bangalore including Mallya Aditi International School (otherwise known as Aditi), Indus International School, National Centre for Excellence and Stonehill Academy.

Bangalore is well known for the quality of education provided by various eminent institutes, every year it attracts aspiring candidate to this city. Few of the well known institutes are the Indian Institute of Science (IISc), National Law School of India University(NLSIU), Indian Institute of Management Bangalore (IIMB), National Institute of Design, R & D Campus (NID), National Institute of Fashion Technology (NIFT ), National Institute of Mental Health and Neurosciences (NIMHANS), Srishti Institute of Art design and technology, Bangalore University, Christ University and Jain University.RV college of Architecture

== Social and Night life ==
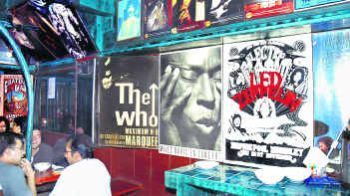
Pecos – a popular pub in Bangalore

Bangalore has an active night culture and is home to over 800 clubs and bars. Since the recent explosion of software companies in Bangalore, it has seen a rise in the number of western-style Malls, such as Phoenix MarketCity, Orion Mall, The Forum, Bangalore Central and The Garuda. These malls are evolving as the current "hang-outs" for the old, with trendy stores, restaurants and the latest crop of clubs. Another change has been the gradual decline of single-screen cinemas and the increase of multiplex theatres, hosted by the same burgeoning malls. The BPO and IT boom have contributed to a lot of disposable income among the younger generation.

Eating out is another passion for Bangaloreans. The variety in terms of cuisines, types and themes that Bangalore restaurants offer is diverse and caters to every taste. Bangalorean's enjoy eating out so much that an actual event circling around restaurants called the Bangalore Restaurant Week was held between 12 and 21 November 2010.

== See also ==
- Bangalore
- Bangalore Ganesh Utsava
- Bangalore Kannada
- Bangalori Urdu
- Kannada
- Karnataka
