= National symbols of Nepal =

Nepal, officially the Federal Democratic Republic of Nepal, is a landlocked sovereign state located in South Asia. It is bordered by two countries: China by the north and India by the east, west and south. It borders the Himalayas including the highest peak, Mount Everest, which is also the highest point on Earth. The Government of Nepal had officially adopted several national symbols such as Nepali as the language, the national flag featuring the Himalayas (removed in 1962) with the Sun and the Moon, rhododendron (Rhododendron arboreum) as the national flower, crimson as the national colour, the Himalayan monal (Lophophorus impejanus) as the national bird, and cow as the national animal.

== Flag ==
Flag of Nepal

The national flag of Nepal (Nepali: नेपालको झण्डा) is the world's only national flag without four corners (non-quadrilateral). The flag is a simplified combination of two single pennons, the vexillological word for a pennant. Its crimson red is the colour of the rhododendron, the country's national flower. Red is also the sign of victory in war. The blue border is the colour of peace. It was first adopted in 1928. Until 1962, the flag's emblems, the Sun and the crescent Moon, had human faces. They were removed to modernize the flag.

The pennons are two but conjoined triangles that represent simultaneously the Himalayas as well as the two major religions, Hinduism and Buddhism. The upper is narrower consisting of a crescent Moon with eight rays. The lower pennon is broader and encloses the Sun having twelve rays. The blue edge around the pennons signifies peace and harmony.

== Emblem ==
Emblem of Nepal

The national emblem of Nepal is a pictorial combination of the Himalayas featuring Mount Everest, the green valleys, yellow fields, hands clasping between male and female, a white outline of the map of Nepal, and surrounded by rhododendron arranged in circle. The national flag is seated on top of the central circle. The modern emblem was introduced in 2020.

== Colour ==
The national colour is crimson that is derived from that of rhododendron. It signifies strength, bravery and unity.

== Anthem ==
Sayaun Thunga Phulka ("Made of Hundreds of Flowers") is the national anthem. It was officially adopted as the anthem on 3 August 2007 during a ceremony held at the conference hall of National Planning Commission, inside Singha Durbar, by the speaker of the interim parliament, Subas Chandra Nemwang. The previous national anthem "Shriman Gambhir" was adopted in 1962 but was dropped following the treaty of the monarchy.

The lyrics were composed by the poet Pradip Kumar Rai, who went by his alias Byakul Maila. The music was composed by Amber Gurung. The theme of the national anthem praises Nepalese sovereignty, unity, spirit, progress, values and traditions.

== Sport ==
Volleyball is the national sport of Nepal. Previously, dandi biyo, a stick game was considered to be de facto national game. However, in 2017, the government of Nepal announced volleyball as the national sport.

== Animal ==
=== Cow ===
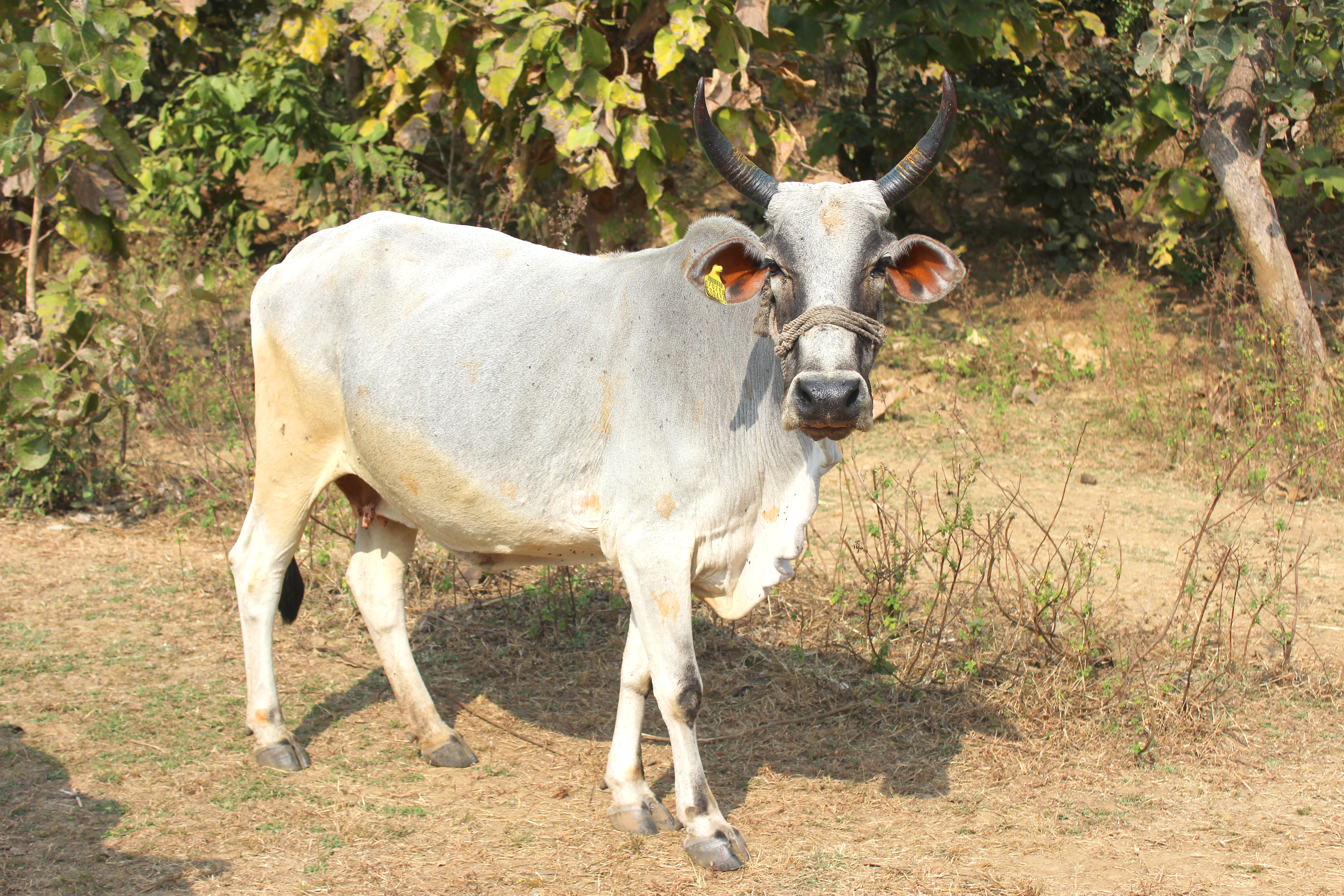
Cow

In 2015, Nepal declared the cow as its national animal. The first president Ram Baran Yadav officially approved it on 20 September. The animal symbolises wealth and prosperity in relation to agricultural heritage. Prior to the announcement, the one-horned rhinoceros was also proposed as the national animal.

=== Bird ===
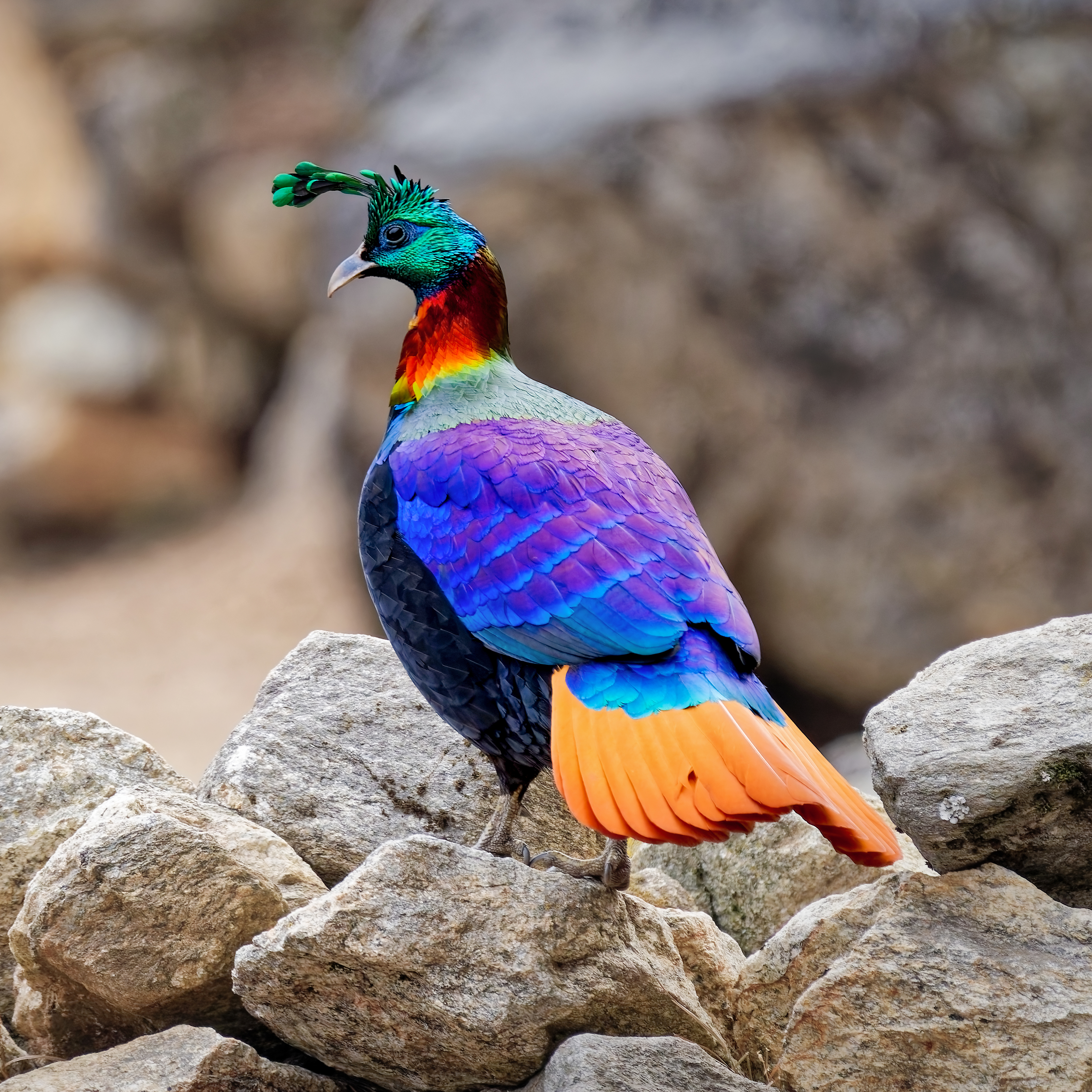
Himalayan Monal (डाँफे)

The national bird is the Himalayan Monal (Lophophorus impejanus), which is one of several pheasants found in the Himalayas. It is also adopted by the neighbouring Uttarakhand in India as its state bird.

=== Yeti ===
Yeti is a purported ape-like animal that inhabits the Himalayan mountain range. In Western popular culture, the creature is commonly referred to as the Abominable Snowman. It is a major element of mythical animal in Nepal and the neighbouring Bhutan. Although it is not the official national animal, it has been used as the symbols of several events and places in Nepal. There are Yeti Airlines and Hotel Yak and Yeti in Kathmandu. It was used as an official mascot of the Visit Nepal 2020 tourism programme.

== Flower ==
The national flower is rhododendron (Rhododendron arboreum).

== Lifestyle symbols ==
Nepal recognised a combination of steamed rice and lentil soup, called dal bhat, as the national cuisine. Traditional dressed are called daura-suruwal for men and gunyu-cholo for women. The wild Himalayan cherry (Prunus cerasoides) is regarded as the national fruit.
