= Radha Thomas =

Indian musician

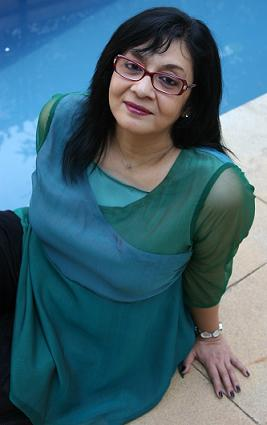
- Radha Thomas

Background information
- Genres: Jazz, blues, pop, Indian classical music
- Occupations: Singer, songwriter, musician, executive
- Website: www.radhathomas.com

Radha Thomas is the Executive Vice-President at Explocity Private Limited, a media publishing house in India. She has held this position since 1999. She is an author, vocalist, and the leader of the jazz fusion band UNK: the Radha Thomas Ensemble.

== Musical career ==
Thomas studied Indian classical music with two Hindustani vocalists, Kumar Gandharva in New Delhi and Ustad Zia Fariduddin Dagar in the art of Dhrupad singing. She blends Indian influences into jazz singing. She began her career as a vocalist in a rock and roll band called Human Bondage.

In 1976, she was selected to represent India at a jazz vocalists festival in Warsaw, Poland. She moved to New York, where she lived for twenty years. She performed at Sweet Basil Jazz Club and The Bottom Line. Some of the musicians she has performed with include John Scofield, Michael Brecker, John Faddis, Alex Blake, Ryo Kawasaki, Joe Farrell, and Greg Alper.

Thomas, known as Radha Shottam, was the featured artist on two albums, Mirror of My Mind and Ring Toss by jazz guitarist Ryo Kawasaki and wrote the lyrics for several of the tracks.

She returned to India in 1993 and began performing with Louis Banks, Sanjay Divecha, Gerard Machado, and Keith Peters She formed her own band in 2009.

Thomas has performed at the ICCR Delhi jazz International Festival, the iSai Music Festival, the Bangalore International Festival, the Bengaluru Habba, the Jazz Yatra, and the Arcosanti Festival.

Between June 2020 and June 2021, Radha Thomas produced and performed in 52 jazz videos which, significantly, amounts to one video a week for a year. The effort involved collaborating with 23 musicians in 12 countries. This was covered by the news website Explocity.

== UNK: The Radha Thomas Ensemble ==
Jazz, bebop, hip hop, blues, Indian classical music, rock and roll, and other modern influences go to create the sound of the band which features Aman Mahajan on piano/keyboards. Mahajan is also co-producer of the band, with Mishko M'ba on bass, Matt Littlewood on saxophone, Suresh Bascara on drums, and Ramjee Chandran on guitar. Their first album, was produced independently and was released in September 2012. Called I Only Have Eyes For You, it features original material and rearranged jazz standards.

== Writing career ==
Besides writing the lyrics for all the original material she performs, she has written, mostly in a humorous vein for the Bangalore Monthly, a column called "Between the Sexes." She released her first book, Men on My Mind. The book was categorized by Rediff as one of the top five romance novels by first-time authors and has been a part of a user review campaign by Blog Adda and has also been written about by several bloggers and newspapers. She also led the editorial team at Explocity. Her work has been published in The Hindu, Man's World, Explocity.com, Bangalore Mirror, Asian Age, and Bangalore Monthly. She wrote the bestselling book The Cauliflower Diet, which examines replacing rice, potato, and other carbohydrates with cauliflower.

Books written by Radha Thomas are:

- Dog Tails (All proceeds from this book go to an animal charity called CARE (Charlies Animal Rescue Centre))
- The Cauliflower Diet
- Men On My Mind
- More Men On My Mind

In January 2022, Radha Thomas started a podcast, The Indie Dog.

== Literary mentions ==
- Savvy magazine July 1998
- Rasa: Music and Dance by Bimal Mukherjee, Sunil Kothari, Ananda Lal, Anamika Kala Sangam and Chidananda Das Gupta
- Gay in the Garden City – The Bangalore Monthly Update, September 1998
- Attendance by the Mohan Khokar Dance Foundation
