= Kavita Puri =

British journalist, broadcaster and author

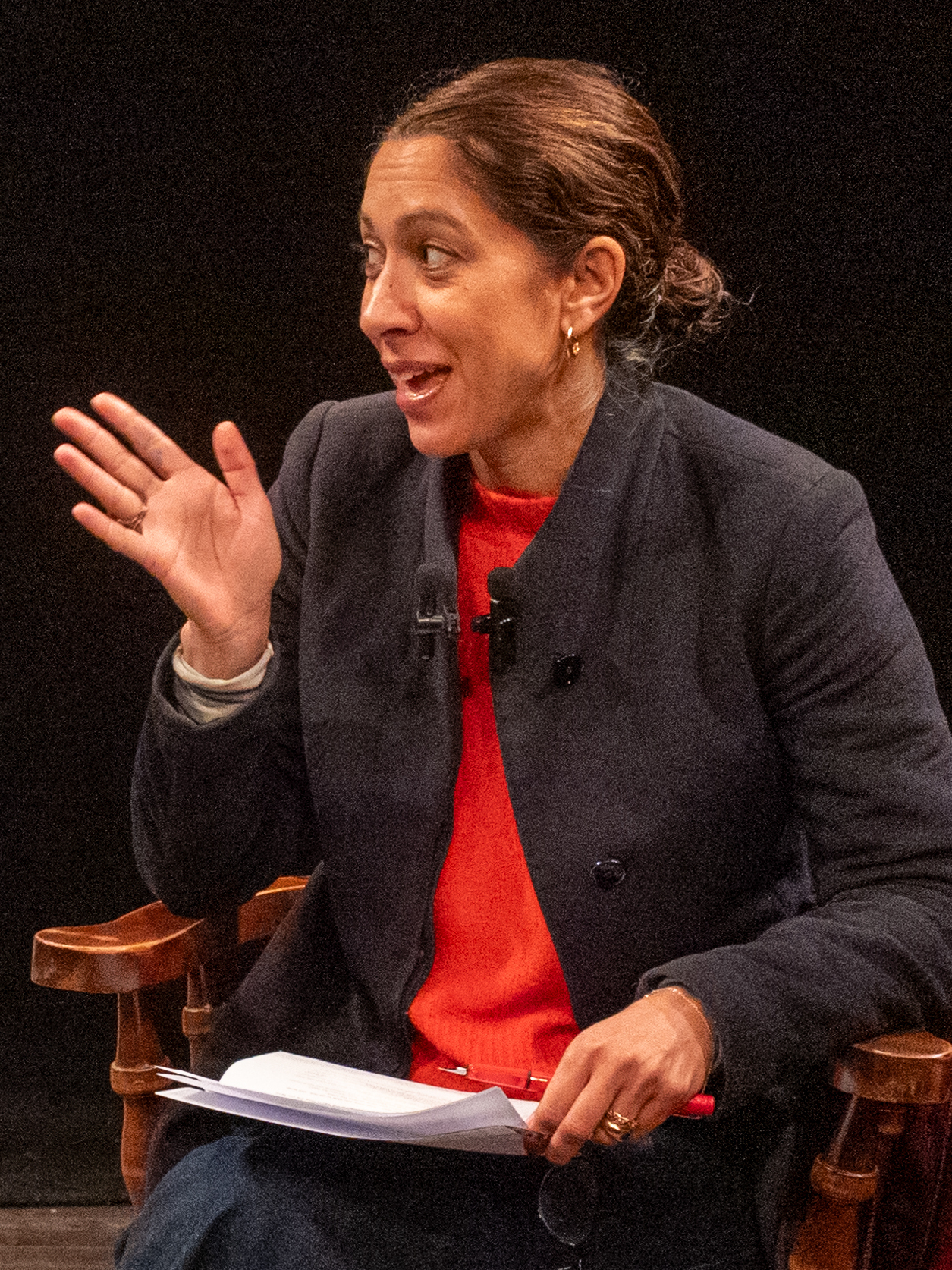
- Puri at the 2024 Chiswick Book Festival
- Education: St Catharine's College, Cambridge
- Occupations: Journalist, radio broadcaster and author
- Notable work: Partition Voices: Untold British Stories (2019)

Kavita Puri is a British journalist, radio broadcaster, and author. Her 2019 book, Partition Voices: Untold British Stories, is based on her award-winning BBC Radio 4 documentary series of the same name.

She appeared on the podcast The Literary City with Ramjee Chandran to discuss her book, Partition Voices. In 2024 Kavita Puri presented a BBC Radio 4 series called Three Million about the 1943 Bengal famine.

== Biography ==
Puri studied law at St Catharine's College at the University of Cambridge, graduating in 1995.

Puri has worked on the BBC's Newsnight as a political producer, film producer and assistant editor, and as the editor of Our World, a foreign affairs documentary programme. Her 2014 BBC Radio 4 series, Three Pounds in My Pocket, told the stories of South Asians who migrated to post-war Britain. In 2015, Puri was named Journalist of the Year by the Asian Media Awards.

In Partition Voices, a three-part series produced for BBC Radio 4 in 2017, Puri documented the stories of Colonial British and British Asians who lived through the 1947 Partition of India. Partition Voices won the Royal Historical Society's Radio and Podcast Award and its overall Public History Prize. In 2019, she published a book, Partition Voices: Untold British Stories, based on the series. In Literary Review, John Keay described the book as "the closest thing to a partition memorial currently on offer," and a "heartfelt and beautifully judged book".

Puri has served as a trustee of the Victoria and Albert Museum since 2018 with a second term due to end in July 2026.
