= Steve Tallis =

Australian singer-songwriter (born 1952)

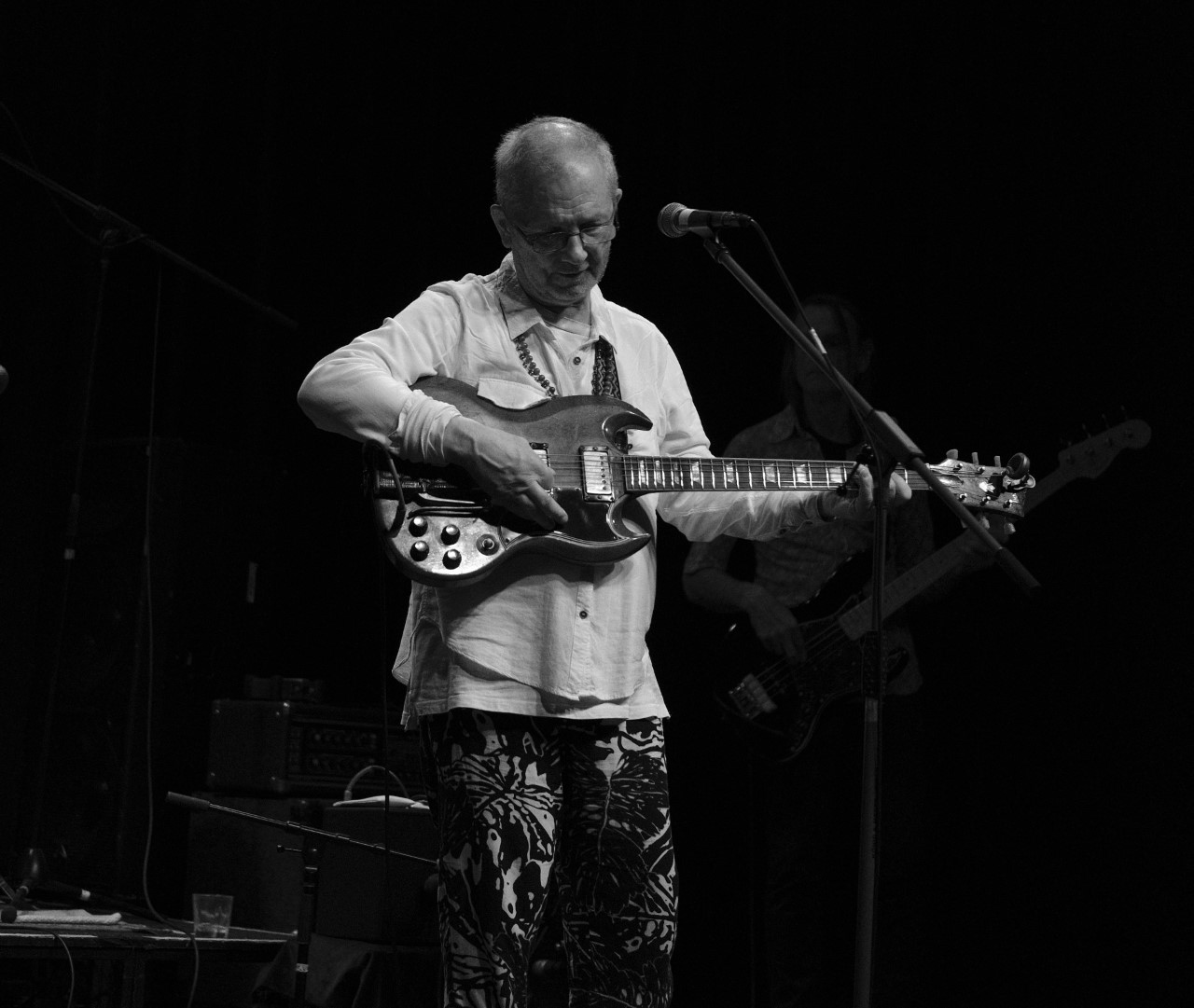
- Tallis in Fremantle in 2018 (picture Hank Kordas)

Background information
- Born: 28 October 1952 (age 73); Maylands, Australia
- Genres: Blues, World music
- Occupations: Musician singer composer
- Instrument: Guitar
- Label: Zombi Music

Steve Tallis (born 28 October 1952) is an Australian singer-songwriter and guitar player.

== Youth ==
Tallis was born in 1952 in Maylands, Western Australia, a suburb of Perth. He started playing music in 1962.

In February 1963, after attending a Louis Armstrong and Trini Lopez concert at the Capitol Theatre in Perth with his parents, Steve was very inspired and told his mother that he wanted to become a professional musician. Surrounded by the traditional Macedonian music of his ancestors and traditional Greek, Yugoslav, Bulgarian and Turkish music, Steve discovered at an early age trance rhythms, improvisation and singing.

Tallis was also influenced by music on the radio at the time, Them, The Animals, The Rolling Stones, Manfred Mann, Jimi Hendrix, The Yardbirds, The Kinks, The Loved Ones or Spectrum. He later was influenced by artists such as Nusrat Fateh Ali Khan or by Bengali Bauls.

He started up many bands throughout his youth, notably My Grandfather's Blues which was awarded "Band of the year" in 1967 during Hoadley's Battle of Bands, organised in parallel to the annual competition Hoadley's Battle of the Sounds.

== Style ==
Praised for his unconventional work, his favourite genre is blues. He described his music as ethnic blues or tribal folk, a mix between blues and world music, with a touch of folk and gospel. He has often been compared to a storyteller. His style has been compared to that "of Van Morrison and Calvin Russell, but with a peculiar originality and a return to the roots of blues."

He has especially been influenced by blues, gospel and Field hollers. He refers today to many musicians who marked his work, such as Leadbelly, John Coltrane, Tim Buckley, Captain Beefheart, Sun Ra, John Lee Hooker, Howlin' Wolf, Muddy Waters, Kevin Coyne, Son House, Tom Waits, Jack Bruce and Kip Hanrahan. Moreover, his music is still influenced by African, Indian, Haitian or Arab traditional music, on a spiritual level as well as on a rhythmic one.

=== Spiritual aspect ===
Trying to go back to the roots of his influences, he studied traditional musics and their spiritual dimension. Many journeys, in India (1997), Pakistan (2003) and Ghana (2005) among others, led him to explore different spiritualities that had a strong impact on his musical production : voodoo, tantra, buddhism, sufism, hinduism or Native American religions.

Steve Tallis has been called a griot or a "blues shaman", his music being entrenched in an oral tradition of storytelling, and his music has been called "tribal or even shamanic folk from an Australian griot open on world music."

== Music career ==
=== Creating music ===
From 1975 on, Tallis started a solo career, during which he gathered many musicians to accompany him in making music but most importantly in live performances. Among other recurring bands can be found Broken Things, My Grandfather's Blues, Jellyroll Bakers, Lucy Crown, Bitch, Fried Egg / Unit Structures, Opposition, Steve Tallis Washboard Unit, Zombi Party, Suicide Ghosts, Holy Ghosts, Troublemakers or Snakes of Desire.

==== Albums ====
In 2001, Tallis released the first part of a limited edition anthology titled Anthology Volume 1 – The Sacred Path of the Fried Egg – From Maylands to the Gates of Hell (1962–2001). It is made of 8 CDs gathering a selection of live and studio recordings, and a booklet. It tells the story of the evolution of his music, his relationship with the city of Perth and its blues scene. Local musicians and friends of Steve are featured in the anthology, bringing back to life the jazz, blues and R&B music scene of the 1970s and 1980s, what led to the anthology being described as a "document of West Australia music culture."

The 2004 album Loko has been produced with members of The Suicide Ghosts, percussionist Gary Ridge and violinist Dave Clarke, and develops the spiritual and shamanistic dimensions already present in the 1999 album Zozo.

He explored Afro-American hollers and classics such as the negro spiritual song "He’s Got the Whole World in his Own Hands" in the 2006 acoustic album Jezebel Spirit, accompanied by percussionist Gary Ridge.

The First Degree, which came out in 2014, was recorded with multi-instrumentalist Skip McDonald, best known as Little Axe, and drummer Evan Jenkins, a friend of Steve Tallis he had worked with in the Apache Dropouts band, and on the recording of the album Zombi Party.

His upcoming album Where Many Rivers Meet, scheduled for 2020, is a solo album recorded in mono, mixing tracks on the electric guitar Gibson SG 1961, acoustic Martin D8 1969 and 12 string acoustic Guild Jumbo 1969, and a cappella Field hollers.

=== Premières parties ===
He played with and accompanied many international and Australian musicians, as a guest or playing first parts. Among other great names can be cited Bob Dylan, Van Morrison, B.B. King, Joe Cocker, Tina Turner, Eric Burdon, Buddy Guy, Mick Jagger, etc. Among Australian musicians, Richard Clapton, Paul Kelly, Chris Wilson, Daddy Cool, Billy Thorpe, Chain, The Triffids, or The Saints can be cited.

=== Festivals ===
Tallis played in many festivals around the world and in Australia, among which can be cited :

==== Around the world ====
- France ((Nièvre) Festival Blues en Loire, 2021)
- France (Cognac Blues Passion, 2016)
- Scotland (Edinburgh Fringe, 2010 and 2011)
- Italy (Villa Celimontana Jazz Festival, 2004)
- Germany (Karlsruhe Rock festival, 1981)
- United States (LarkFest in Albany, 1982)
- Ghana (Panafest, 2005)
- India (Freedom Jam in Bangalore celebrating the 50th anniversary of India's independence, August 1997; Indian Week, 2018)
- Pakistan (World Performing Arts Festival in Lahore, 2003)

==== In Australia ====
===== Western Australia =====
- Nannup Music Festival
- Fairbridge Festival
- Perth International Arts Festival (known today as Perth Festival) (2002 and 2003)
- Moonlight Music and Wine Festival (2003)
- Blues at Bridgetown (every year between 1993 and 2005, then less regularly, his last performance dating back from 2018)

===== Victoria =====
- Wangaratta Festival of Jazz and Blues (2000 and 2013)
- Apollo Bay Music Festival (2006)
- Port Fairy Folk Festival (1998)

===== New South Wales =====
- Australian Blues Music Festival Goulburn (1999 and 2001)
- Thredbo Legends of the Blues Festival (2001 and 2007)
- East Coast Blues and Roots Festival in Byron Bay (1993) (known today as Byron Bay Bluesfest)

===== Queensland =====
- Woodford Folk Festival (2000)
- Blues at Broadbeach

===== Northern Territory =====
- Alice Springs Blues Festival (1987)

=== Acknowledgement ===
He has been described as "one of Australia’s most eccentric and powerful singer songwriters". He has been acknowledged by his fellow musicians as a great bluesman. In his tune "You Don’t Have to Be Pretty to Sing the blues", Dave Hole mentions Tallis among other very famous bluesmen :

Albert Collins sings the Blues

Eric Clapton sings the Blues

Steve Tallis sings the Blues

B.B. King, Freddie King, Albert King

In 1978, his song "Dreams" was awarded Song of the Year by The West Australian newspaper. In 1993, Steve Tallis was named singer-songwriter of the year by The Western Australian. In 1994, he entered the WAMI Hall of Fame. In 1999, his album Zozo was elected Album of the Year by a panel of readers from the Australian magazine Rhythms Magazine.

In 2003, Tallis was awarded a fellowship by the Western Australian Music Industry association, backed by the Department of Culture and the Arts of Western Australia. This fellowship allowed him to study, compose and tour in Africa, India, France, Macedonia and Greece.

Tallis has been referred to in a number of reference and anthology books about Australian music, notably in the Who's Who of Australian Rock, The Encyclopedia of Australian Rock and Population by Ian McFarlane (1999 and 2017 editions), in Further Down the Road – A New Approach to Life by J.F. Hoskin (1983), in Working Musicians by Stephen Smith and John Robinson (1990) or in Jive Twist and Stomp – West Australian Rock & Roll Bands of the 50s and 60s by Murray Gracie and John Mills (2010).

Some of his live performances have also been broadcast on TV, at Blues at Bridgetown festival in 1995 (on ABC TV, tracks from the album Zombi Party), during the Blues Moon over Byron festival or the East Coast Blues Festival (on ABC TV in 1993). Some of his performances have been used in documentaries (Perth Uncovered, 1995).

In 2007, he worked on the release and promotion of his album Loko in France, which was met with great success, called an "a typical yet very blues album" or a "perfect alchemy [...] between blues roots and more contemporanean and avant-garde styles."

=== Promoting music ===
Alongside his career as a musician, Tallis has always been active in the field of music. He worked for Australia's legendary import record shops, 78 Records (1975–1979) and joined Audex Sound, Australia's leading equipment hire company, in 1976.

In 1983, he created the radio program Spoonful of Blues, that still showcases non-conventional blues music, on 6UVSFM, now RTRFM, a Perth based Australian radio.

He launched his own independent record distribution company, Monkey Music, record store importing and exporting music from worldwide musicians to facilitate their distribution in Australia (1985). The company developed to include studios before closing in 1996.

Tallis was a promoter and tour organiser for international and national touring musicians (1986 to 1993). He acted as a consultant for many Australian musician, bands and record labels, and represented Western Australia at international trade fairs such as Midem and WOMEX (1990 and 2007).

Since 1997, he has passed on his experience of the music industry and of production by teaching professional or self management skills at different teaching organisms, such as the Perth UWA Conservatorium of Music, the WA Academy of Performing Arts or the Western Australia TAFE in Leederville (1992 to 1999).

Taking care of the transmission of music to future generations, he acted as a consultant to the Library Board of Western Australia (1986–2003), collecting music releases for the library to archive and preserve.

From 2015 to 2019, Steve created and managed a new club for local musicians in Fremantle called The Gaslight Club, first located at The Fly By Night Club and later at Ronnie Nights Bar.

== Discography ==
=== With bands ===
- 1968 : Jellyroll Bakers (single)
- 1969 : Jellyroll Bakers (2LP)
- 1971 : Lucy Crown Survival concerts – Live at the Octagon Theatre (cassette)
- 1978 : Hangover Triangle – The Sweetcorn Sessions (cassette)
- 1979 : Steve Tallis and the Opposition – On the Floor (LP, Fried Record Company)
- 1982 : Steve Tallis and the Guano Club, Live in New York (cassette)
- 1983 : Apache Dropout – Live at the WA Institute of Technology (cassette)
- 1991 : Apache Dropouts – First Girl on the Dance Floor Wins a Night out with the Sax Player

=== Solo ===
==== EP, singles and lives ====
- 1974 : The Armstrong Sessions (cassette)
- 1983 : Scarecrow / Three times in one hundred dozen moons / Desire (EP, Lizard Records)
- 1986 : A Woman is a secret / Drunk (single, Lizard Records)
- 1987 : Alexander Monkey / Cinema Masquerade (single, Monkey Music)
- 1988 : Live at the Stoned Crow (cassette)
- 1990 : Washboard Unit / Experience – The Shelter Sessions (cassette)
- 1998 : The Paris Sessions (cassette)

==== Albums ====
His albums are produced by the independent label Zombi Music that he created.

- 1993 : Zombi Party
- 1997 : Monkey Skulls and Thunderstones
- 1999 : Zozo
- 2001 : Anthology Volume 1 – The Sacred Path of The Fried Egg – From Maylands to The Gates of Hell (1962–2001)
- 2004 : Loko (2007 in France
- 2006 : Jezebel Spirit
- 2014 : The First Degree
- 2020 : Where Many Rivers Meet

== Awards ==
=== West Australian Music Industry Awards ===
The West Australian Music Industry Awards are annual awards celebrating achievements for Western Australian music. They commenced in 1985.

Year	Nominee / work	Award	Result
1994	Steve Tallis	Rock 'n' Roll of Renown	inductee
