= Chakrapani Chalise =

Nepalese poet

Pandit Chakrapani Chalise
- पण्डित चक्रपाणि चालिसे
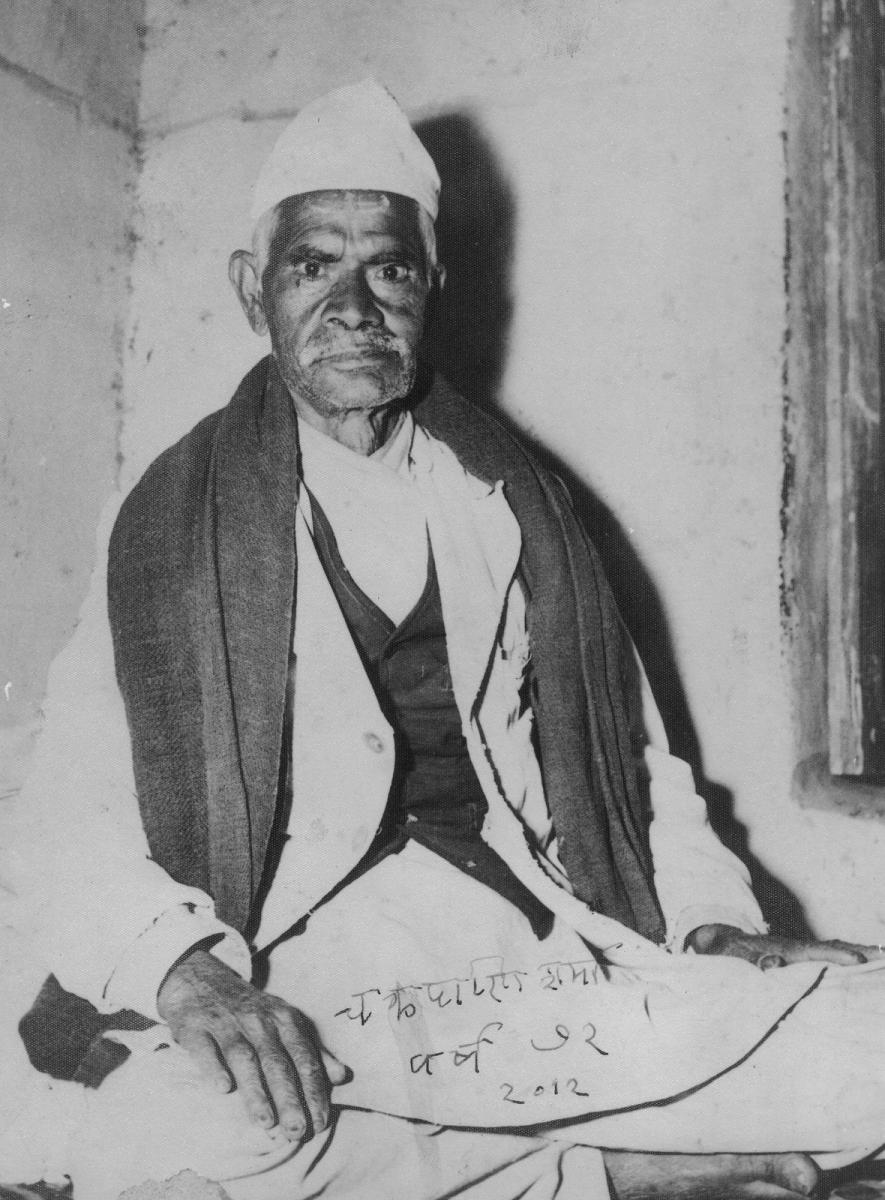
- Pandit Chakrapani Sharma Chalise in 2012 B.S. (1955/1956 A.D.)
- Born: 1883 A.D. (1940 B.S.); Katunje, Bhaktapur district
- Died: 1958 A.D. Kathmandu district
- Notable work: writer of Shreeman Gambhir

Chakrapani Chalise (Nepali: चक्रपाणि चालिसे) was a Nepalese poet. He wrote the words of the first national anthem of Nepal in 1924 AD to the music composed by Bakhat Bahadur Budhapirthi in 1899 AD (grandfather of musician Louis Banks or Dambar Bahadur Budaprithi). The musical part of anthem was created during Prime Minister Bir Shamsher Jang Bahadur Rana's era. Later the Nepali Language Publications Committee was ordered to write words for the anthem. Chakrapani being assistant to Superintendent of the Committee, wrote the words for the anthem.

Chakrapani is considered as the poet who connected two different eras in Nepali literature. Motiram Bhatta's romanticistic era was connected to Lekhnath Paudyal's era by Pandit Chakrapani. Later, a commemorative stamp of Nepali Rupees 4.5 was issued for his contribution to Nepali literature.

His 133rd birth anniversary was celebrated by prize distribution and literary programme at Katunje, Bhaktapur by Chakrapani Smarak Samiti (a memorial committee).

== Early years ==
Chakrapani Chalise was born on 1940 B.S. (1883 A.D.) at Katunje, Bhaktapur district in a Chalise Brahman family to father Premlal Chalise and mother Nagini Chalise. His mother died while he was young and he left to mother's maternal home after ill treatment by step mother. He married aged 12 to Gayatri Devi who was 10 and had 1 son and one daughter after which she died. He thereafter realized and became a siddha guru.

== Works ==
His main published works are:

- Shriman Gambhir (श्रीमान गंभीर) Sriman Gambhir: The Greatest Mix
- Machchhindranathko Katha (मच्छिन्द्रनाथको कथा)
- Niti Ratna Manisha (नीति रत्न मञ्जुषा)
- Nepali Samchhipta Ramayana (नेपाली संक्षिप्त रामायण)
- Nepali Samchhipta Mahabharata (नेपाली संक्षिप्त महाभारत)
- Meghadoot Chhaya (मेघदूत छायाँ)
- Isabhasyopanishad (इशावास्योपनिषद)
- Nepali Bagalikosh (नेपाली बगलीकोष)
- Sahitya Mimamsa (साहित्य मिमांशा)
- Manusmriti (मनुस्मृति)
- Chakra Kabita Tarangini (चक्र कविता तरङ्गिणी)
- Jaimanya Bharat (जैमनिय भारत)
- Bhagawatibhola Bhajanmala (भगवतीभोला भजनमाला)
- Shri Chitrakootothbhavakara (श्री चित्रकूटोथभवकारा)
- Chakrappan Chalisa (चक्रप्पन चालीसा)
- Jatayu Mimamsa (जटायु मीमांसा)
- Pinda Kosha (पिंडा कोश)
- Kanakadasa Mrityu Bhaya (कनकदास मृत्यु भाया)
- Chaudeshwara Lingam (चौदेश्वर लिंगम)
- Laudeshwara Chingam (लौदेश्वर चिंगम)
- Modono Jzalila Indusevira (मोडोनो जज़लीला इंदुसेविरा)
- Sarvabhowmasya Jati Bheda (सर्वभौमस्य जाति भेद)
- Saisha Chintamani (सायशा चिंतामणि )
- Shriman Bhagavadageedha (श्रीमन भगवदगीड़ा)
- Gambhira Ramacharitham (गंभीर रामचरितम)
- Marana Divasa (मारना दिवस) maranadivasa (Remastered 2023)
