= Bangalore Restaurant Week =

Recurring food festival in Bangalore, India

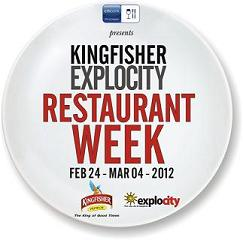
- Locations: Bangalore, India
- Patrons: Kingfisher, Explocity
- Website: bangalorerestaurantweek.com

Bangalore Restaurant Week is a recurring food festival held in Bangalore, India, which involves participation of restaurants and food lovers from Bangalore. Started in 2010, it is India's first large scale food and dining related festival or event. 74 restaurants in Bangalore participated in the event in 2010.

== History ==
Hotel was a South Indian hotel consisting veg and non veg later introduced almost all types now grown in large and spread throughout Bangalore.

== Events and sub-events ==
A number of sub-events which involved eating out related contests for patrons and guests at restaurants and shopping malls were a part of Bangalore Restaurant Week.

- King of Chefs – The curtain raiser of the event.
  - The Competition – Seven of Bangalore's best chefs participated in a cooking competition wherein they had to display their skills.
  - Executive Chef Rana Dominic Gomes of Hotel Royal Orchid Central won the first ever King of Chefs competition.
  - King of Chefs was judged by gourmet specialist Karen Anand and Wine sommelier Magandeep Singh.
  - In 2010, it was held in UB City.
- Mall Events – A number of events held across various malls in Bangalore.
- Grand Finale - In the grand finale of the 2010 event, a popular restaurant made Bangalore's biggest Crostini sandwich at Mantri Square which was given to a charitable organisation.
