= Shriman Gambhir =

Former national anthem of Nepal (1962–2006)

Srimān Gambhir
English: 'Thee May Glory Crown, Courageous Sovereign'
- श्रीमान् गम्भीर
- Former coat of arms of Nepal
- Former national anthem of Nepal
- Also known as: राष्ट्रिय गान (English: 'National Song')
- Lyrics: Chakrapani Chalise, 1924, 1962
- Music: Bakhat Bahadur Budhapirthi, 1899
- Adopted: 16 December 1962
- Relinquished: 19 May 2006
- Succeeded by: "Sayaun Thunga Phulka"

Audio sample
- Choral rendition in G major: file; help

"Srimān Gambhir", (Note: Nepali: श्रीमान् गम्भीर [sɾiman ɡʌmbʱiɾ]) also known as "Rāṣṭriya Gān", (Note: Nepali: राष्ट्रिय गान [ɾasʈɾije ɡan]) was the national anthem of the Kingdom of Nepal from 1962 to 19 May 2006, when the political parties prepared to abolish the monarchy. It was officially replaced by "Sayaun Thunga Phulka".

== History ==
The music was composed by Bakhat Bahadur Budhapirthi (grandfather of musician Louis Banks) in 1899, and the lyrics were written by Chakrapani Chalise in 1924. It was adopted as the country's national anthem in 1962, as a homage to the Nepalese sovereign.

The song originally had two stanzas, but the Nepalese government dropped the second stanza upon adopting the song as the national anthem. The stanza that was retained honoured the king.

=== Replacement ===
Following the 2006 democracy movement in Nepal, "Rastriya Gaan" was discontinued by order of the interim legislature of Nepal in August 2007, after it was seen as merely glorifying the monarchy instead of representing the nation as a whole. It was then replaced by the current national anthem "Sayaun Thunga Phulka".

== Lyrics ==
When officially adopted, the government of Nepal dropped the second verse of the song.

Instrumental Version

The song’s second verse remained largely unknown to the general public for many years. On January 11, 2019, a re-recorded version of the anthem featuring the previously omitted second verse was released on YouTube. The recording also features a regal four-bar orchestral introduction, followed by the entrance of the choir. This orchestral opening, along with the second verse, was omitted from the version that was officially adopted as Nepal’s national anthem.

Nepali original

श्रीमान् गम्भीर नेपाली
प्रचण्ड प्रतापी भूपति
श्री पाँच सरकार महाराजाधिराजको सदा रहोस् उन्नति
राखुन् चिरायु ईशले
प्रजा फैलियोस, पुकारौँ जय प्रेमले
हामी नेपाली साराले

वैरी सरु हराउन्, शान्त होउन् सबै विघ्न व्यथा,
गाउन् सारा दुनियाँले सहर्ष नाथको सुकीर्ति-कथा;
राखौँ कमान,भारी-वीरताले,नेपालीमाथि सधैँ नाथको,
श्री होस् ठुलो हामी गोर्खालीको

Srimān gambhir Nepāli
Pracanḍa pratāpi bhupati
Sri pāñchsarkār Mahārājādhirājako sadā rahos unnati
Rākhun cirāyu isale
Prajā phailios, pukārauñ jaya premale
Hāmi Nepāli sārāle.

Bairi saru harāun, sānta houn sabai bighna byathā
Gāun sārā duniyāñle saharsa nāthako sukirti kathā
Rākhauñ kamān bhāri biratāle Nepālimāthi sadhaiñ nāthako
Sri hos ṭhulo hāmi gorkhāliko.

IPA transcription (Note: See Help:IPA/Nepali and Nepali phonology.)

[sɾi.man ɡʌm.bʱi.ɾʌ ne.pa.li]
[pɾʌ.t͡sʌɳ.ɖʌ pɾʌ.ta.pi bʱu.pʌ.ti]
[sɾi pãt͡sʰ sʌɾ.kaɾ mʌ.ɦa.ɾa.d͡za.dʱi.ɾa.d͡zʌ.ko sʌ.da ɾʌ.ɦos un.nʌ.ti]
[ɾa.kʰun t͡si.ɾa.ju i.sʌ.le]
[pɾʌ.d͡za pʰʌi̯.li.os pu.ka.ɾʌ̃ũ̯ d͡zʌ.e pɾe.mʌ.le]
[ɦa.mi ne.pa.li sa.ɾa.le ‖]

[bʌi̯.ɾi sʌ.ɾu ɦʌ.ɾau̯n san.tʌ ɦou̯n sʌ.bʌi̯ biɡ.nʌ be.tʰa]
[ɡau̯n sa.ɾa du.ni.jã.le sʌːɾ.sʌ na.tʰʌ.ko su.kiɾ.ti kʌ.tʰa]
[ɾa.kʰʌ̃ũ̯ kʌ.man bʱa.ɾi bi.ɾʌ.ta.le ne.pa.li.ma.tʰi sʌ.dʌ̃ĩ̯ na.tʰʌ.ko]
[sɾi ɦos ʈʰu.lo ɦa.mi ɡoɾ.kʰa.li.ko ‖]

English translation

O noble and dignified Nepali,
The mighty and glorious sovereign,
May His Majesty the King always prosper.
May God grant him a long life.
May the people flourish; let us proclaim victory with love,
All of us Nepalis together.

May all foes vanish, and may disaster lessen.
May the whole world chant in glee the triumph of the lord.
May the lord's audacious bow forever shield the Nepalese.
Victory to thee, O supreme ruler of Gorkhali.
