= VV Puram Food Street =

Food street in Bangalore, India

Coordinates: 12.951302°N 77.577588°E

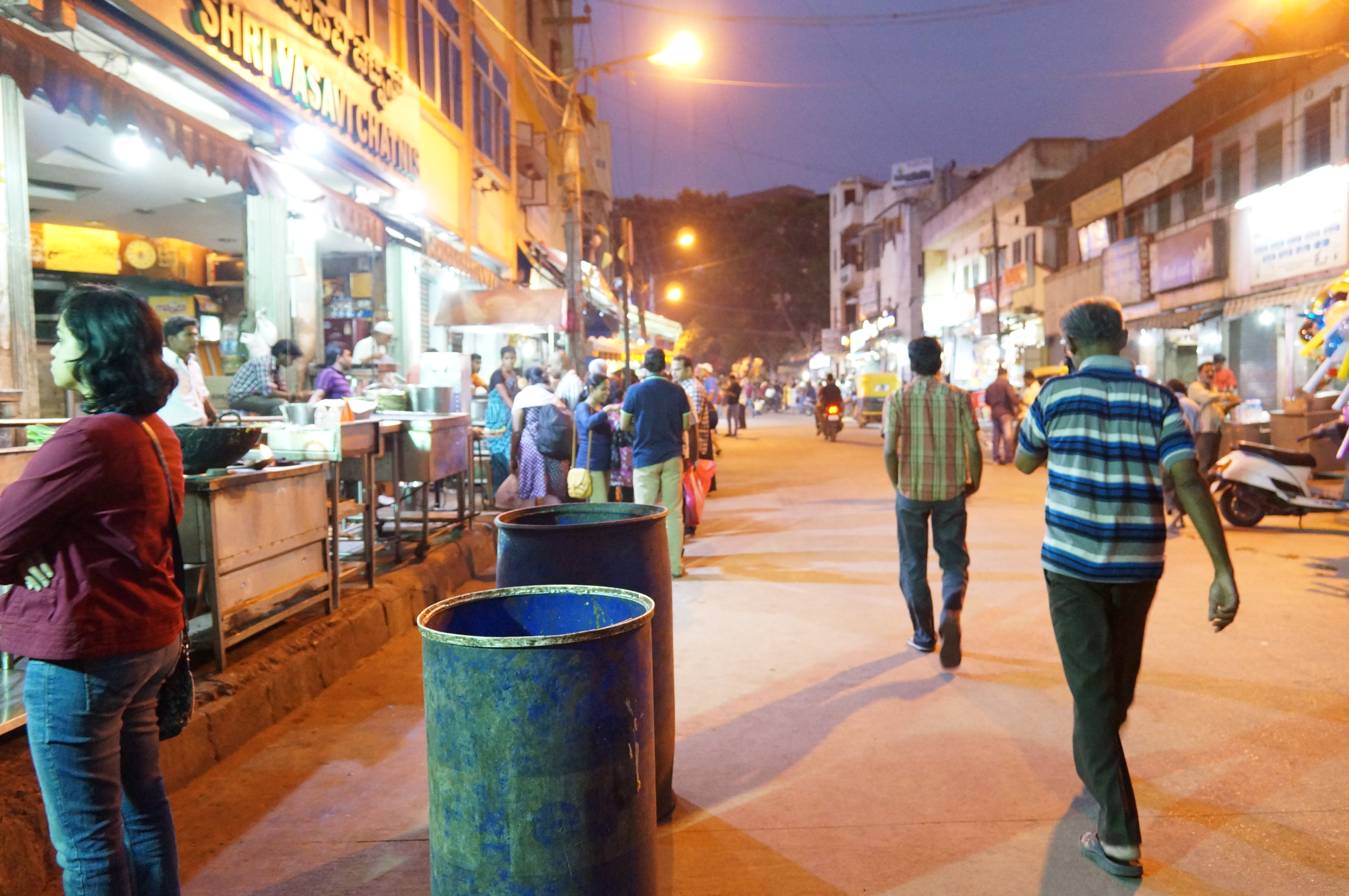
VV Pura Food Street

VV Puram Food Street or Visveswara Puram Food Street is a food street in Visveswarapura, Basavanagudi, Bangalore. Located near Sajjan Rao Circle, the street has over 20 food stalls in less than 150 meters serving varieties of pure vegetarian street food, sweets, South Indian, North Indian and Chinese dishes. Called Thindi Beedi in Kannada, the food street is said to have a cult status among Bangaloreans. The street typically becomes busy after six in the evening.

The food street hosts the "Avarekai Mela" annually in the winter months of December/January, when varieties of dishes are prepared using avarekai (hyacinth beans)–both hithkabele (peeled beans) and avarebele (unpeeled beans). The festival which started as an effort to sell the produce of avarekai farmers became popular over the years with more than 1000 kg of avarekai being purchased directly from the farmers on each day of the festival.

== See also ==
- List of restaurant districts and streets
- Culture of Bangalore
