= Louis Banks =

Indian composer and singer (born 1941)

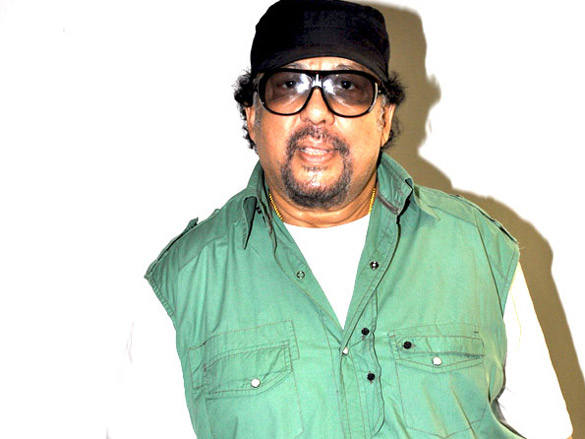
- Banks in 2011

Background information
- Born: Dambar Bahadur Budaprithi; 11 February 1941 (age 85); Calcutta, British India
- Genres: Jazz, world music, Indian pop
- Occupations: Singer, musician, composer, record producer
- Instruments: Piano, trumpet, guitar, keyboard
- Years active: 1982–present

Louis Banks (born Dambar Bahadur Budaprithi on 11 February 1941) is an Indian film composer, record producer, keyboardist, and singer. He has often been referred to as the 'Godfather of Indian jazz'.

== Early life ==
Louis Banks was born to Nepali parents Saraswati and Pushkal Budaprithi ("George Banks"), a musician, at Calcutta and grew up in his hometown of Darjeeling. His early music education was at the hands of his father and neighbour Mrs. Myers. His father Pushkar Bahadur, a Nepalese trumpeter moved to Calcutta in the early 1940s to join a European Band in the city, subsequently he changed his name to George Banks. His great grandfather, Bakhat Bahadur Budapirti, had composed the Nepalese national anthem Shreeman Gambhira Nepali which was the official anthem from 1962 to 2006.

He did his schooling at St. Roberts School, Darjeeling. Sensing Banks's interest in western music when at the age of thirteen he started playing the guitar and the trumpet, his father changed his name to Louis Banks in tribute to Louis Armstrong. This change of name gave the young Banks the confidence to make it big in the world of western music. He started receiving piano lessons from his father and also played in his band. Banks went to college at St. Joseph's College in Darjeeling, where he continued to study piano.

== Career ==
After college Banks worked as a teacher at St. Joseph's school. Later he moved to Kathmandu his father's request and started working as a musician, he was already well versd in jazz, as a pianist, and many other instruments and experimented with his jazz music. In the late 1960s, he performed at the Soaltee Hotel in Kathmandu, for three years. During his stay there he rejected an offer from R. D. Burman to work with him in Mumbai. Banks received offers from Calcutta and eventually moved base to Calcutta in 1971, where he met singer Pam Craine and saxophonist Braz Gonsalves and formed The Louis Banks Brotherhood. The band began performing at the Hindustan Hotel which led to an invitation to play at the Blue Fox Restaurant, a popular night club famous for its patronage of live western music. From there on he was able to get work composing advertisement jingles and stage musicals.

In 1977, he met R. D. Burman, who was a frequent visitor to the Blue Fox Restaurant and he was asked to join his troupe in Mumbai, Burman happily took him in. In Mumbai, Banks was introduced to different world music genres and he was able to thrive in the rich music scene. As he cemented his place and reputation in the city he popularised live jazz at Mumbai nightclubs. In 1979, along with Goan saxophonist Braz Gonsalves he formed the 'Indo-Jazz Ensemble', composing music on Indian classical scales and Jazz rhythms, incorporating Indian instruments like ghatam and thavil. In February 1980, he was a member of the jazz quartet which was part of the orchestra to perform with Ravi Shankar in his noted suite Jazzmine at the 'Jazz Yatra' Festival. He also formed a group called Sangam teaming up with Carnatic classical vocalist, Ramamani and together they performed about 60 concerts all over Europe and participated in festivals, the group however was short-lived as Ramamani was from Bangalore, while Louis was based in Mumbai and the logistics became too difficult. In 2005, Banks formed a group Rhythm Asia with Taufeeq Qureshi on the tabla and Niladri Kumar on the sitar.

In 1988, Banks composed the tunes to the iconic Mile Sur Mera Tumhara, a short film on national integration for Doordarshan, at that time India's sole broadcaster. Due to its popularity, the tune has often been dubbed the unofficial Indian anthem. Banks would go on to provide music to similar patriotic short films like Desh raag and Spread the light of freedom. In 1990 he composed music for the Malayalam-language experimental silent film Vembanad. India Today described his music as one of the highlights of the critically acclaimed film. He formed a new band called 'Silk' with Shankar Mahadevan, Sivamani and Karl Peters. He has performed at various concerts and with well-known jazz artists such as Radha Thomas and Joe Alvares. He has provided the musical score to a number of Hindi films and two English films Bokshu – The Myth and God Only Knows, a comedy satire directed by Bharat Dabholkar. He also provided the score for Roshni a musical, directed by Alyque Padamsee. He is working on a progressive fusion jazz album titled Labyrinth with his son's band Nexus.

His 2008 collaboration as co producer, arranger and pianist/keyboards on the album Miles from India, a tribute to the founder of modern jazz Miles Davis was nominated for the Grammy Awards 2008 in the Best Contemporary Jazz Album category. In the same category, John McLaughlin's fusion album Floating Pointwas also nominated, Banks was the featured keyboardist on the album.

== Personal life ==
He is married to Lorraine originally from India. They have five children, Anthony, Andre, Gino Banks, Neil, and Monique. Gino Banks is an accomplished drummer and member of the fusion band 'Nexus'. Banks lives and works from Juhu, Mumbai.

== Filmography ==
Year	Film
1982	An August Requiem
1986	New Delhi Times
1986	Kala Dhanda Goray Log
1990	Vembanad
1991	Hum
1991	Lakshmanrekha
1992	Suryavanshi
1992	Aasmaan Se Gira
1993	Divya Shakti
1994	Insaniyat
1995	God and Gun
1995	Barsaat
1998	Duplicate
2000	Punaradhivasam (Co-Composed by Sivamani)
2002	Bokshu – The Myth
2004	God Only Knows!

== Discography ==
Year	Album
1997	The Freedom Run
2005	Love is in the air – Music for romance 1
2005	Love is in the air – Music for romance 2
2008	Miles from India
2008	Floating Point – John McLaughlin
2011	Moonlight in Goa
2011	Labyrinth
2011	Solo Piano Ballads
2016	GANGASHAKTI

== See also ==
- List of Jazz Arrangers
