= Freedom Jam =

Annual event in Bangalore City, India

Freedom Jam is an event that is held in Bangalore City, Karnataka, India every year on 15 August (India's Independence Day).

== Overview ==
The Freedom Jam is a musical gathering. It is the continuation of an old musical tradition in Bangalore, where for a few years in the early eighties at Cubbon Park but is held now at Palace Grounds, musicians used to get together and perform free on Sunday evenings and still continue to do so.

The concert was revived during the Golden Jubilee celebrations of Indian Independence in 1997 featuring Ravindra Kalakshetra.

It was continued in the form of monthly jams regularly held on the first Sunday of every month (called the Sunday Jam) and a night-long free music festival - The Freedom Jam Festival - on the eve of Independence Day.

Performances have included Bangalore artists Human Bondage, Konarak Reddy, K.C.P., along with Indian artists Lucky Ali, David Rothenberg (New York), Sarjapur Blues Band, Baja, Steve Tallis (Australia), Vasundhara Das, Esperanto, Threnody, Kryptos, Bhoomi, Thermal and a Quarter. The concert has attracted audiences of over 10,000.

In 2005, the organisers of the Freedom Jam had planned for a night-long event on 15 August but had to abandon it due to terrorist activities which took place in a nearby city resulting in Bangalore being put on high alert. The Freedom Jam of 2006 was postponed to November.

The two events have served as a launchpad for many amateur artistes (particularly rock and metal bands) as well as a sort of comeback stage for established singers from Bangalore.

Freedom Jam has been started recently in neighbouring Metropolitan city of Chennai also. This year it happens in buck's theatre YMCA nandanam on 19 August. Similar to the Freedom Jam in Bangalore, this is also a free entry event.

== Pondy Freedom Jam ==
The Freedom Jam—Pondy Music Festival has been held in Puducherry, on the Bay of Bengal coast 150 kilometres (93 mi) south of Chennai, for the last six years supported by the Dept. of Tourism. It is now held on the Republic Day weekend in January, the 'tourist season' when the weather is pleasant at several different venues showcasing music simultaneously on the beachfront. In 2010 artistes like Ministry of Blues, Matt Littlewood Group, BAJA, Inside Out, Alan Rego and many more bands including a host of ethnic performers performed over two evenings and a 'morning raga' recital at sunrise.

The concert has also been held in Chennai, once at Bucks open-air theatre, YMCA and last year at Spaces, Elliots Beach & Musee Musicale.

== See also ==
- Indian rock
- Music of India
- Culture of Bangalore
