= Partition Voices =

Book on partition of India

Partition Voices: Untold British Stories
- First edition cover
- Author: Kavita Puri
- Audio read by: Kavita Puri
- Language: English
- Subject: Partition of India
- Genre: Non-fiction
- Publisher: Bloomsbury Publishing
- Publication date: 11 July 2019
- Publication place: United Kingdom
- Media type: Print (hardcover)
- Pages: 320
- ISBN: 978-1-4088-9907-6

Partition Voices: Untold British Stories is a non-fiction book by Kavita Puri, published in 2019 by Bloomsbury Publishing. The book includes interviews with British people originating from the Indian subcontinent, who witnessed the 1947 partition of India.

== Background ==
In 2017, Puri produced a three-part documentary series, Partition Voices, for BBC Radio 4, about people who witnessed the partition and subsequently migrated to Britain. The series won the Royal Historical Society's Radio and Podcast Award and its overall Public History Prize. The book, Partition Voices: Untold British Stories, is based on the series. It contains interviews with about two dozen British people who witnessed partition, including the author's father.

== Reception ==
Partitian Voices earned positive critical reviews. In Literary Review, John Keay called it a "heartfelt and beautifully judged book". A review in The Hindu described it as "an important document of those turbulent times — raw and unbiased," while a review from Scroll.in praised it as "an important milestone in the Partition project because it ascribes importance to the British-South Asian dynamic and talks about the shared history of these two nations without villainising or glorifying either side."
