= Gino Banks =

Indian drummer

Gino Banks is an Indian drummer and the son of legendary Jazz musician Louis Banks. A versatile musician, Gino performs and records with artists and bands of all types of genres. Some of the artists he has played with are Louiz Banks, Ustad Zakir Hussain, Shankar Mahadevan, Pt. Hariprasad Chaurasia, the late Pt. Shivkumar Sharma, to name a few.

Gino Banks performed with santoor player Tarun Bhattacharya, on Indian Independence Day's eve, at Ravindra Bharathi auditorium, in 2016. He also performed at the Four Aces concert in 2022, alongside other Indian and Fusion legends, including Shankar Mahadevan, Ustad Zakir Hussain, Louiz Banks (his father), Sheldon D'Silva, Rakesh Chaurasia.

== Background ==
Born and brought up in Mumbai, Gino Banks grew up surrounded by music and started playing drums when he was only 8 years old. By the age of 9, he was touring Australia and China with his father, Louis Banks' band, SANGAM, an indo-jazz fusion band, playing percussion for them.

Do not be scared. Music is fun. Work hard and dedicate yourself to it and practice everyday consistently. It is important to know about the history of music and where it comes from and why a particular instrument is played the way it is and it also to explore every genre.

— Gino Banks
