= 78 Records =

Music store in Perth, Western Australia

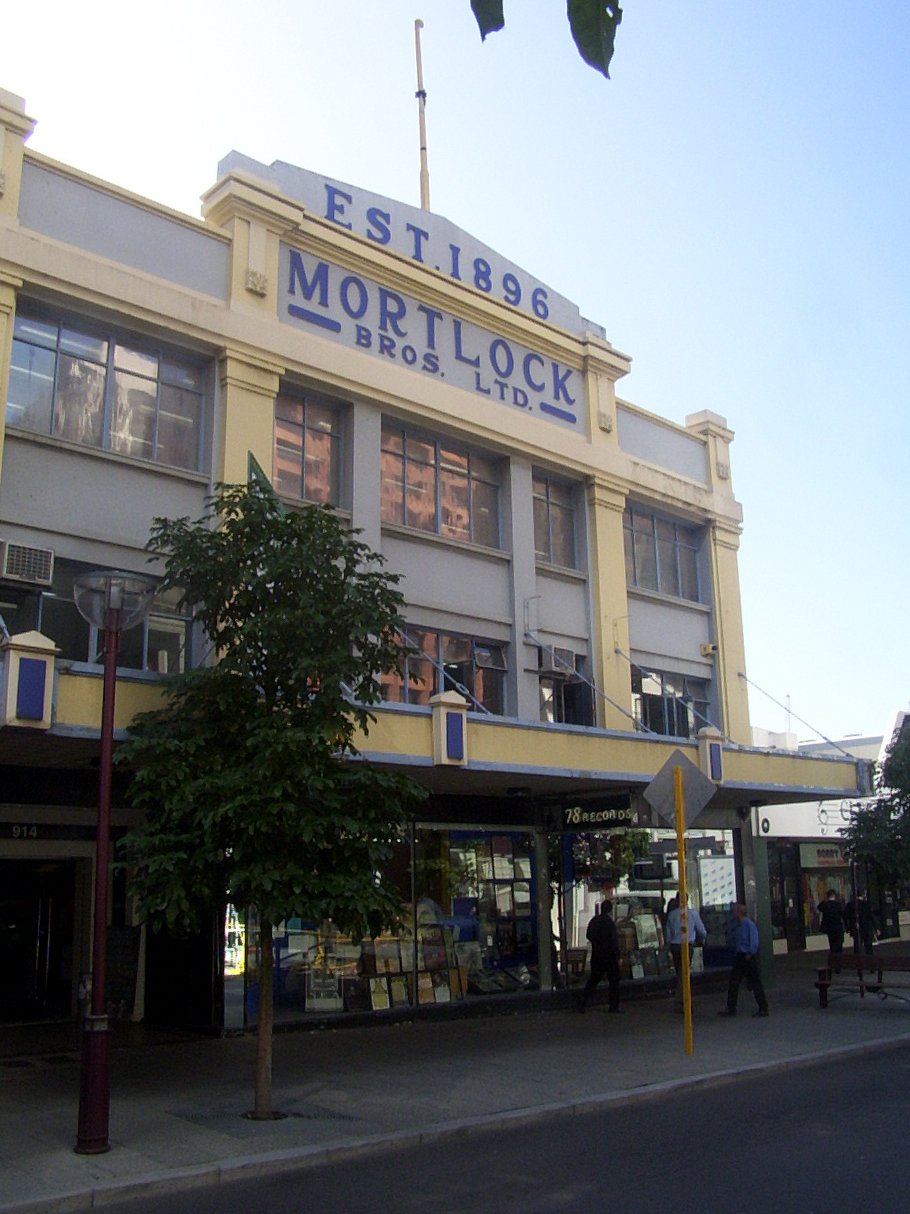
Storefront of 78 Records, 2008

78 Records was a music store located in the central business district of Perth, Western Australia. The store also sold DVDs, clothing and tickets to music and comedy events.

Due to the history of the business, the large variety of music sold, and promotion of local acts, the store has had a significant influence upon local culture and the music scene within Perth

== History ==
78 Records first opened on 19 June 1971 on the first floor of the Padbury Building in Forrest Place. Geoff "Hud" Hudson, John Hood, and John "Scruff" McGregor started the store to provide music that was unavailable from other outlets.

In its infancy, 78 Records boasted about 300 titles, all on vinyl and mainly imports, with a strong leaning towards blues but also encompassing an extensive range of other genres, though space was constrained as the store was housed in two small rooms. It was the three owners' love of the blues that inspired the store's logo, with its photographic representation of Blind Lemon Jefferson. The name 78 Records derives from the 78 rpm format on which his original recordings were released.

78 Records steadily expanded by providing customers with music that was hard to come by in the early 1970s, such as Rolling Stones Sticky Fingers, Jethro Tull's Aqualung and Neil Young's Harvest. In 1973, rumours started regarding the proposed demolition of the Padbury Buildings, which eventuated with the construction of Forrest Chase in the re-designed Forrest Place during the late 1980s.

In May 1974, 78 Records moved into what was essentially a tin shed next door to His Majesty's Theatre, Western Australia at 843 Hay Street, which has become affectionately known as "the old building". The increase in floor size enabled 78 Records to add a lounge area where customers could lounge in beanbags and listen to the music prior to making their purchases, the first such facility in Perth. 78 Records expanded its available music and started its tradition of an in-house band, the West Australian Chainsaw Orchestra, theme days and the selection of the instrumental "A Walk in the Black Forest" by Horst Jankowski at closing time.

During the 843 era, 78 Records also earned a reputation which travelled much further than the metropolitan area, and visiting international performers frequented the shop in search of that elusive record they couldn't find anywhere else. Of course, some of them just wanted to check out how many of their own albums were in stock. Joe Cocker, Van Morrison, Elvis Costello, Bette Midler, Lou Reed and Elton John were just some of the artists that came back on their next visit.

843 Hay Street was proposed for demolition in 1987. Wanting to stay in the same area they had become associated with, 78 Records crossed Hay Street to number 884. In 1989, the Basement opened with videos, books, posters, comics T-shirts, and tickets for forthcoming events. 78 Records expanded from solely music-related items with the Basement developing a unique identity with the inclusion of film, interactive media and cult writing.

78 Records moved again in March 1996 to 914 Hay Street, where it stayed for 16 years. The first floor of this larger building had its own stage which was frequently used by local, national and international artists.

In 2013 the store moved to premises above 255 Murray Street with entry from a laneway off Murray Street Mall.

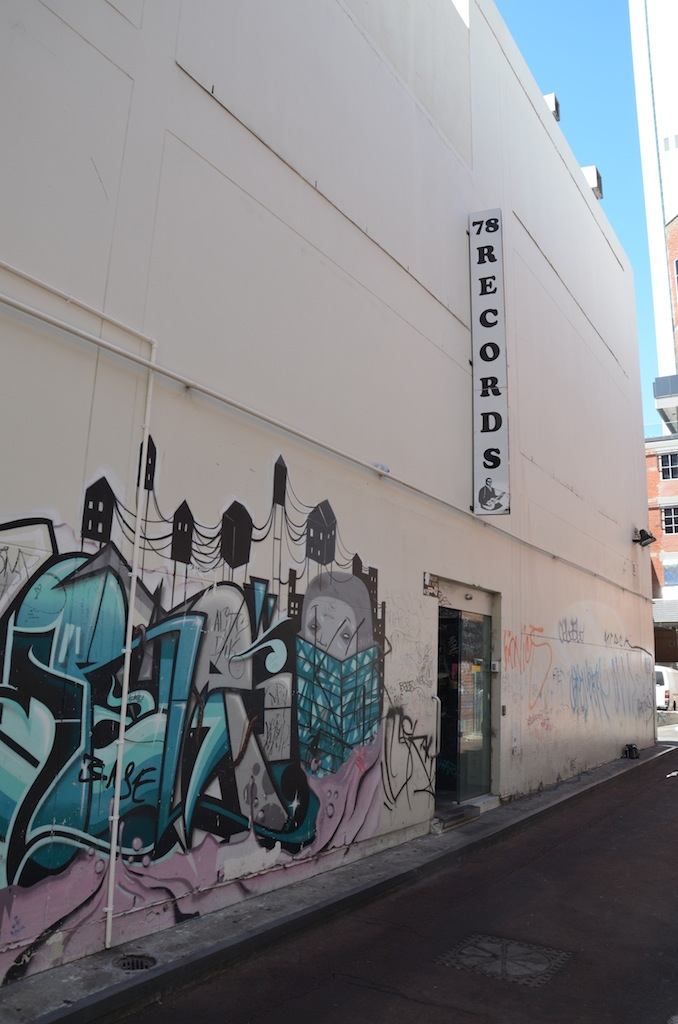
Entrance in 2017

On 5 February 2019 the manager of 78 Records announced that the store would be closing on 3 March 2019 after nearly 48 years of operation, blaming the rise of streaming services and declining retail conditions as the reasons for the closure.

== Awards ==
78 Records won the ARIA Award for Best Independent Retail Outlet in Western Australia in 2007.
