= Nepali phonology =

Sounds and pronunciation of the Nepali language

Nepali is the national language of Nepal. Besides being spoken as a mother tongue by more than 48% of the population of Nepal, it is also spoken in Bhutan and India. The language is recognized in the Nepali constitution as an official language of Nepal.

The variety presented here is standard Nepali as spoken in Nepal. There are three major dialects: eastern, central, and western. Though many dialects can be distinguished in Nepal and other South Asian countries, there is reported to be little variation in phonology from one to another.

== Vowels ==
Nepali has 11 phonologically distinctive vowels, including 6 oral vowels and 5 nasal vowels. In addition, due to a process of h-dropping, there are words with intervocalic h that speakers pronounce with a long, breathy-voiced vowel in its place (e.g. पहाड 'mountain' /pʌɦaɖ/ → [pa̤ːɽ]).

Nepali vowel phonemes
	Front		Central		Back	
	oral	nasal	oral	nasal	oral	nasal
Close	i	ĩ			u	ũ
Close-mid	e	ẽ			o	
Open-mid					ʌ	ʌ̃
Open			a	ã		

As the above list shows, there are five nasal vowels. The high mid back vowel /o/ does not have a nasal counterpart at the phonological level; although the vowel [õ] does exist phonetically in the language, it is often in free variation with its oral counterpart, as in [hot͡so] ~ [hõt͡so] 'short', [bʱeɽaː] ~ [bʱẽɽaː] 'sheep'. Nasal vowels are not frequent in the Nepali lexicon, compared to French in which the number of lexicon with nasal vowels is large. They occur mostly in verbs.

According to Bandhu et al. (1971), the evidence for the distinctiveness of vowel nasalization is not nearly as strong as that for the distinctiveness of the six oral vowels. They state that minimal pairs are easily obtainable only for the vowel /a/. Examples are shown below:

- /kap/ 'inside corner', /kãp/ 'tremble!' (tremble.2SG.IMP)
- /bas/ 'shelter', /bãs/ 'bamboo'
- /bʱaɽa/ 'rent', /bʱãɽa/ 'pots'
- /tat/ 'be heated!', /tãt/ 'row'
- /t͡sap/ 'pressure', /t͡sãp/ 'magnolia wood'

Other minimal pairs include /naũ̯/ 'name' vs. /nau̯/ 'barber' and /ɡaũ̯/ 'village' vs. /ɡau̯/ 'sing!' (sing.2SG.IMP). At the phonetic level, oral vowels can be nasalized when following a nasal consonant.

=== Diphthongs ===
Pokharel (1989:37–38) followed two diphthongs first elaborated by Shivaraja Acharya in वर्णोच्चारण शिक्षा in 1974.

Diphthongs	Examples	Gloss	Orthographic
/ʌi̯/	/kʌi̯le/	'when'	कैले
/ʌu̯/	/d͡zʌu̯/	'barley'	जौ
/ai̯/	/bʱai̯/	'younger brother'	भाइ
/au̯/	/au̯/	'come!'	आऊ!
/ei̯/	/sʌnei̯/	'trumpet'	सनेई
/eu̯/	/eu̯ʈa/	'one'	एउटा
/iu̯/	/d͡ziu̯/	'body'	जीउ
/oi̯/	/poi̯/	'husband'	पोइ
/ou̯/	/dʱou̯/	'wash!'	धोऊ!
/ui̯/	/dui̯/	'two'	दुई

=== Schwa-deletion ===
The following rules can be followed to figure out whether or not Nepali words retain the final schwa:

1. The schwa (transcribed and pronounced in modern Nepali as /ʌ/ instead of /ə/) is retained if the final syllable is a conjunct consonant. अन्त anta [ʌntʌ] 'end', सम्बन्ध sambandha [sʌmbʌndʱʌ] 'relation', श्रेष्ठ śreṣṭha [sɾeʂʈʰʌ] 'greatest'.
2. For any verb form, the final schwa is always retained unless the schwa-cancelling halanta is present, e.g. हुन्छ huncha [ɦunt͡sʰʌ] 'it happens', भएर bhaera [bʱʌeɾʌ] 'therefore', and गएछ gaecha [gʌet͡sʰʌ] 'he apparently went'; however, छन् chan [t͡sʰʌn] 'they are', and गईन् gain [gʌi̯n] 'she went'.
  Meanings may change with the wrong orthography, e.g. गईन gaina 'she didn't go' vs. गईन् gain 'she went'.
3. Adverbs, onomotopeia and postpositions usually maintain the schwa and if they don't, halanta is required: अब aba [ʌbʌ] 'now', तिर tira [tiɾʌ] 'towards', and आज āja [ad͡zʌ] 'today', as opposed to सिम्सिम simsim 'drizzle', and झन् jhan [d͡zʱʌn] 'more'.
4. A few nouns retain the schwa, e.g. दुख dukha [dukʰʌ] 'suffering, sorrow', and सुख sukha [sukʰʌ] 'pleasure'.

Note: final schwas in Indo-Aryan languages are often retained in music and poetry to facilitate singing and recitation. (Refer to "Sayaun Thunga Phulka" and "Jana Gana Mana" for this case.)

== Consonants ==
Spoken Nepali has 30 consonants in its native system though some have tried to limit the number to 27.

Nepali consonant phonemes
			Bilabial	Dental	Alveolar	Retroflex	Dorsal	Glottal
Nasal			m ⟨म⟩		n ⟨न/ञ⟩	(ɳ ⟨ण⟩)	ŋ ⟨ङ⟩	
Plosive/ Affricate	voiceless	unaspirated	p ⟨प⟩	t ⟨त⟩	t͡s ⟨च⟩	ʈ ⟨ट⟩	k ⟨क⟩	
Plosive/ Affricate	voiceless	aspirated	pʰ ⟨फ⟩	tʰ ⟨थ⟩	t͡sʰ ⟨छ⟩	ʈʰ ⟨ठ⟩	kʰ ⟨ख⟩	
Plosive/ Affricate	voiced	unaspirated	b ⟨ब⟩	d ⟨द⟩	d͡z ⟨ज⟩	ɖ ⟨ड⟩	ɡ ⟨ग⟩	
Plosive/ Affricate	voiced	aspirated	bʱ ⟨भ⟩	dʱ ⟨ध⟩	d͡zʱ ⟨झ⟩	ɖʱ ⟨ढ⟩	ɡʱ ⟨घ⟩	
Fricative					s ⟨श/ष/स⟩			ɦ ⟨ह⟩
Trill					r ⟨र⟩			
Approximant			(w ⟨व⟩)		l ⟨ल⟩		(j ⟨य⟩)	

The glides [j] and [w] are nonsyllabic variants of /i/ and /u/, respectively. The combination of the labio-velar approximant /w/ and /e, i, o, ʌi̯, r, w, j/ is constrained in Nepali, thus the orthographic ⟨व⟩ is always pronounced as a bilabial stop /b/ in such cases, but only sometimes otherwise. All consonants except /j, w, ɦ/ have geminates between vowels. Apart from forming lexically distinctive words, as in /tsʌpʌl/ चपल ('unstable') and /tsʌpːʌl/ चप्पल ('slipper'), gemination also forms the intensive degree of adjectives, as in /miʈʰːo/ ('very delicious'), compare /miʈʰo/ ('delicious').

The murmured stops may lose their breathy-voice between vowels and word-finally. Non-geminate aspirated and murmured stops may also become fricatives, with /pʰ/ as [ɸ], /bʱ/ as [β], /kʰ/ as [x], and /ɡʱ/ as [ɣ]. Examples of this are /sʌpʰa/ 'clean' becoming [sʌɸa] and /ʌɡʱaɖi/ 'before' becoming [ʌɣaɽi]). Additionally, the bilabial fricatives [ɸ] and [β] can further become labiodental fricatives [f] and [v] respectively through fortition.

/ɖ ɖʱ ʈ, ʈʰ/ are flapped ([ɽ, ɽ̊]) in postvocalic position. /r/ is usually a trill [r] but may be a tap [ɾ] in intervocalic position.

Typically, sounds transcribed with the retroflex symbols ⟨ʈ, ʈʰ, ɖ, ɖʱ, ɽ, ɳ, ɽ̃⟩ are not purely retroflex [ʈ, ʈʰ, ɖ, ɖʱ, ɽ, ɳ, ɽ̃] but apical postalveolar [t̠, t̠ʰ, d̠, d̠ʱ, ɾ̠, n̠, ɾ̠̃]. Some speakers may use purely retroflex sounds after /u/ and /a/, but other speakers use the apical articulation in all positions.

The unvoiced and voiced alveolar affricates [ts, tsʱ, dz, dzʱ] are frequently realized as unvoiced and voiced fricatives [s, z] respectively in intervocallic as well as occasionally in word initial positions. Aspiration is often maintained in the case of aspirated affricates, such as /ad͡zʱʌi̯/ 'still, until now' becoming [azʱʌi̯]. Additionally, the voiceless fricative [s] is realized as the voiced fricative [z] before the voiced stop [d] in the morpheme boundary.

=== Debated consonants ===
Mostly words from Sanskrit have consonants that are not very common in inventory of the spoken language, occurring in borrowed words where they are prescriptively pronounced as described in Sanskrit grammars. The retroflex nasal /ɳ/ occurs in the speech of some speakers, in words such as /baɳ/ बाण ('arrow'). It is flapped [ɽ̃] in spelling pronunciations of some loanwords in Sanskrit.

== Phonotactics ==
=== Syllable structure ===
Syllables may be structured as (C_{1})(C_{2})(C_{3})V(C_{4}).

Nepali syllable structure consists of an optional syllable onset, consisting up to three consonants; an obligatory syllable nucleus, consisting of a vowel; and an optional syllable coda, consisting of one consonant. The following restrictions apply:

- Onset
  - First consonant (C_{1}): Can be any consonant.
  - Second consonant (C_{2}): Can be any consonant.
  - Third consonant (C_{3}): Can only be liquids (/r/ and /l/) and semivowels (/j/ and /w/).
- Nucleus
  - Vowel (V)
- Coda
  - Consonant (C_{4}): Can be any consonant.

==== Final Cluster ====
Additional consonant(C_{5}) in coda occurs in loanwords and in handful of native words such as [ɡʌnd͡z] (गञ्ज) and [mʌnt͡s] (मञ्च).

== Bibliography ==
- Acharya, Jayaraj (1991), A Descriptive Grammar of Nepali and an Analyzed Corpus, Georgetown University Press, ISBN 0878400737
- Bandhu, Chudamani; Dahal, Balabh Mani; Holzhausen, Andreas; Hale, Austin (1971), Nepali Segmental Phonology, Tribhuvan University Kirtipur, Nepal.: Summer Institute of Linguistics
- Clements, G.N.; Khatiwada, Rajesh (6–10 August 2007), "Phonetic realization of contrastively aspirated affricates in Nepali" (PDF), Proceedings of ICPhS XVI, Saarbrücken, pp. 629–632
- Dahal, M.D. (1974), A description of Nepali: Literary and colloquial (PhD), University of Pune, India
- Khatiwada, Rajesh (2007), "Nepalese retroflex stops: a static palatography study of inter- and intra-speaker variability", INTERSPEECH-2007, Antwerp, Belgium, pp. 1422–1425
- Khatiwada, Rajesh (2009), "Nepali", Journal of the International Phonetic Association, 39 (3): 337–380, doi:10.1017/S0025100309990181
- Pokharel, Madhav Prasad (1989), Experimental analysis of Nepali sound system (PhD), University of Pune, India
- आचार्य, शिवराज (1974), नेपाली वर्णोच्चारणशिक्षा, साझा प्रकाशन,काठमाडौँ
- बन्धु, चुडामणि (२०२५ [1968]) नेपाली भाषाको उत्पत्ति, साझा प्रकाशन, काठमाडौँ (२०५२ [5th ed., 1995])
- पोखरेल, मा. प्र. (2000), ध्वनिविज्ञान र नेपाली भाषाको ध्वनि परिचय, नेपाल राजकीय प्रज्ञा प्रतिष्ठान, काठमाडौँ ।
