= Kalakkad S. Ramanarayana Iyer =

Indian Carnatic musician

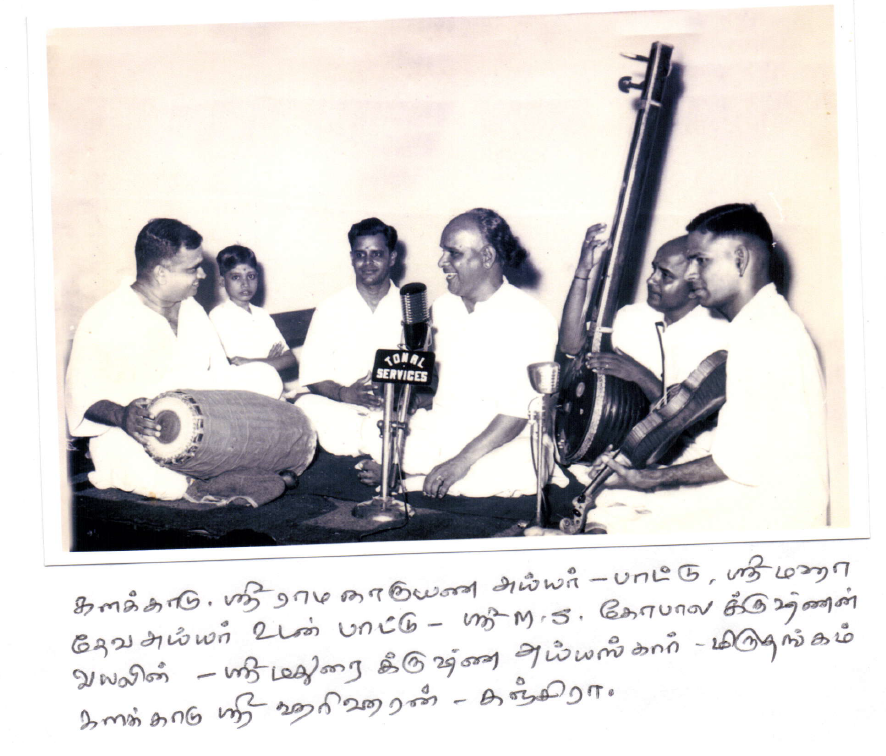

Background information
- Born: 10 October 1910
- Origin: Kalakkad, Tamil Nadu, India
- Died: 9 November 1992 (aged 82)
- Genre: Carnatic music
- Occupation: Singer

Kalakkad S. Ramanarayana Iyer (Tamil: களக்காடு ராமநாராயண ஐயர்; 10 October 1910 – 1992) was a Carnatic musician and composer born in Kalakkad, Tirunelveli District, Tamil Nadu, India. He was awarded the Kalaimamani prize by the Government of Tamil Nadu in recognition of his contribution to music.

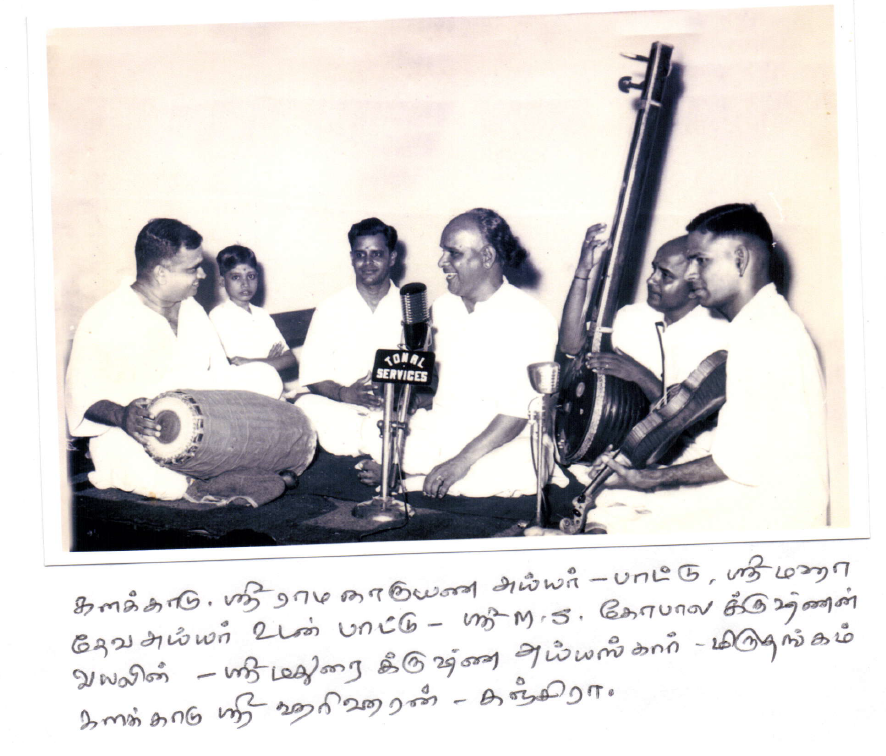
Ramanarayana Iyer with M S Gopalakrishnan, Madurai Krishna Iyengar on mridangam, Kalakkad Harihara Iyer on kanjira and Kalakkad Mahadeva Iyer Tambura

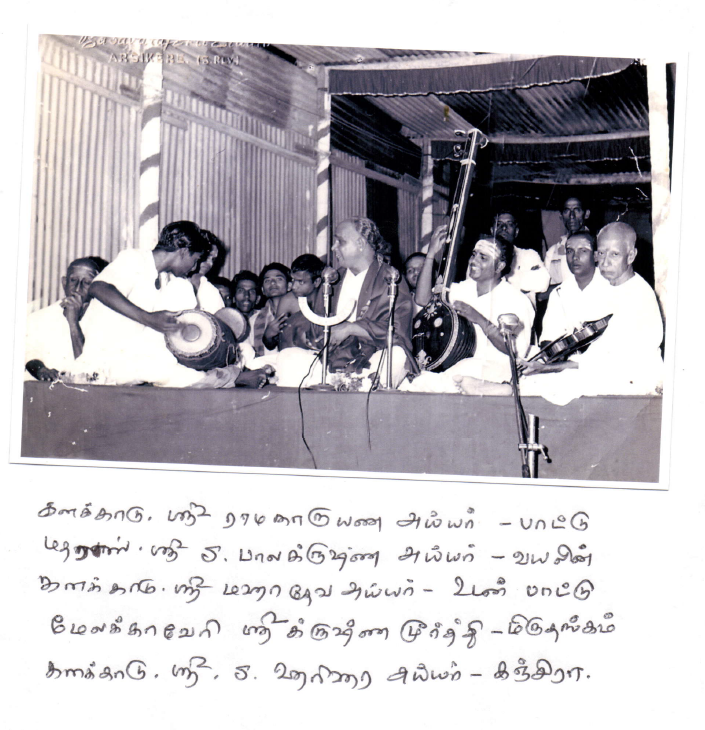
Ramamnarayana Iyer with Madras Balakrishna Iyer on violin, Melakaveri Krishnamurthy on mridangam, Nagai Soundararajan on ghatam
