= Byakul Maila =

Lyricist of Nepalese national anthem (born 1973)

- व्याकुल माइला
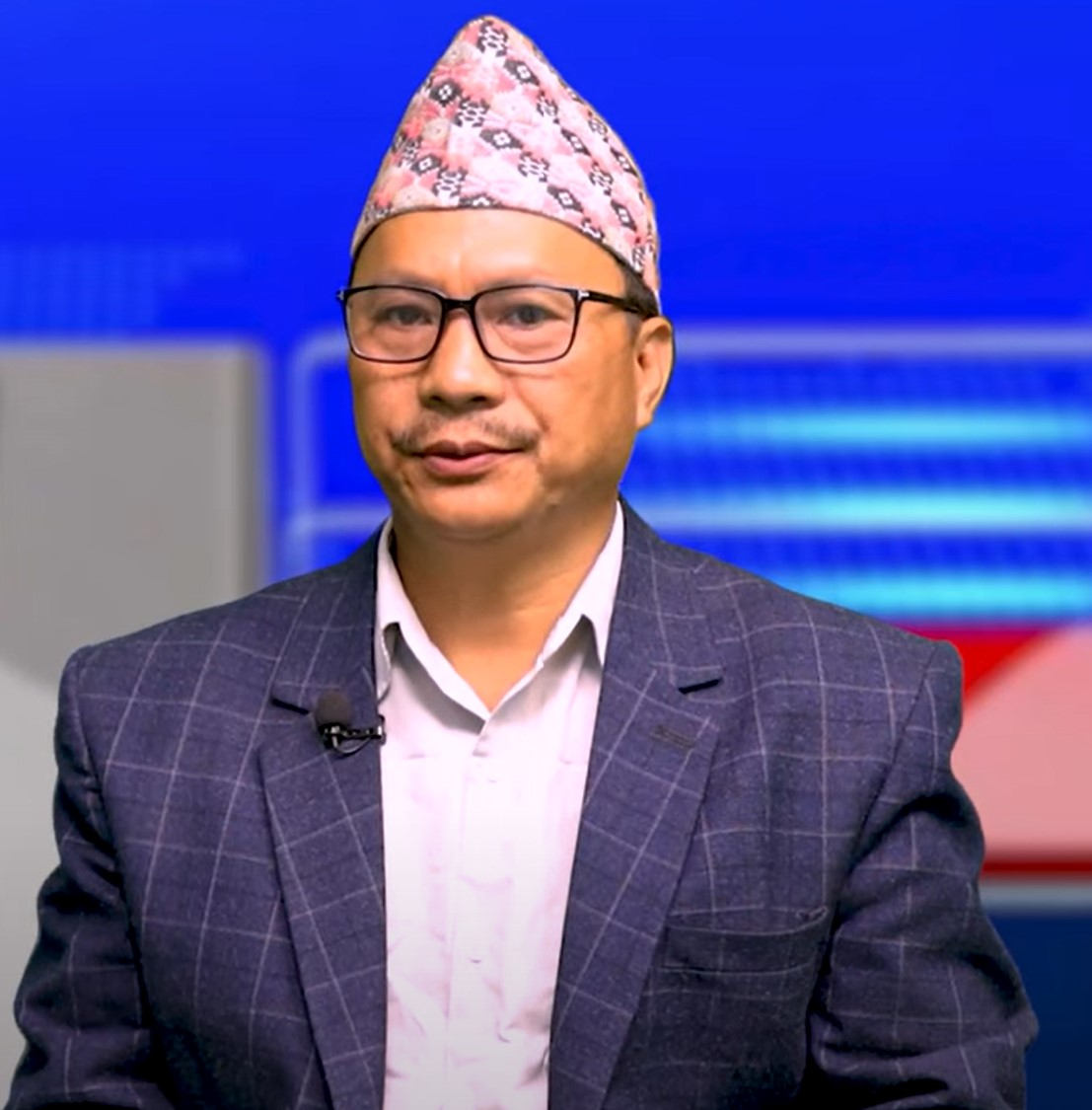
- Byakul Maila at an interview for Aajako Press (2022)
- Born: Pradeep Kumar Rai; 7 April 1973 (age 52); Okhaldhunga, Kingdom of Nepal (now Nepal)
- Citizenship: Nepali
- Occupations: Poet, songwriter
- Notable work: Lyricist of national anthem of Nepal.

Pradeep Kumar Rai, professionally known as Byakul Maila, is a Nepalese poet who wrote the lyrics of the current Nepalese national anthem Sayaun Thunga Phulka.

His writing was selected to be the national anthem of the newly declared Federal Democratic Republic of Nepal on 30 November 2006 out of 1272 submissions. The new national anthem was meant to be representative of the new era in the history of Nepal, after the abolition of monarchy in 2006. Amber Gurung composed music for the song.
