= World Music Centre =

Non-profit membership association in Mostar, Bosnia and Herzegovina

World Music Centre (CWM) is an independent non-profit membership association in Mostar, Bosnia and Herzegovina. Its mission includes bringing worldwide cultural heritage closer to one another as well as promoting local music traditions. It also promotes tolerance, understanding and democracy within youth and children.

The centre is active in the management of concerts and music events In 2007 it organized the first edition of the World Music Festival, conceived as a meeting between different cultures and peoples. Its programme included workshops for children and adults as well as wine tasting.
