= Garuda Mall =

Garuda Mall Bangalore
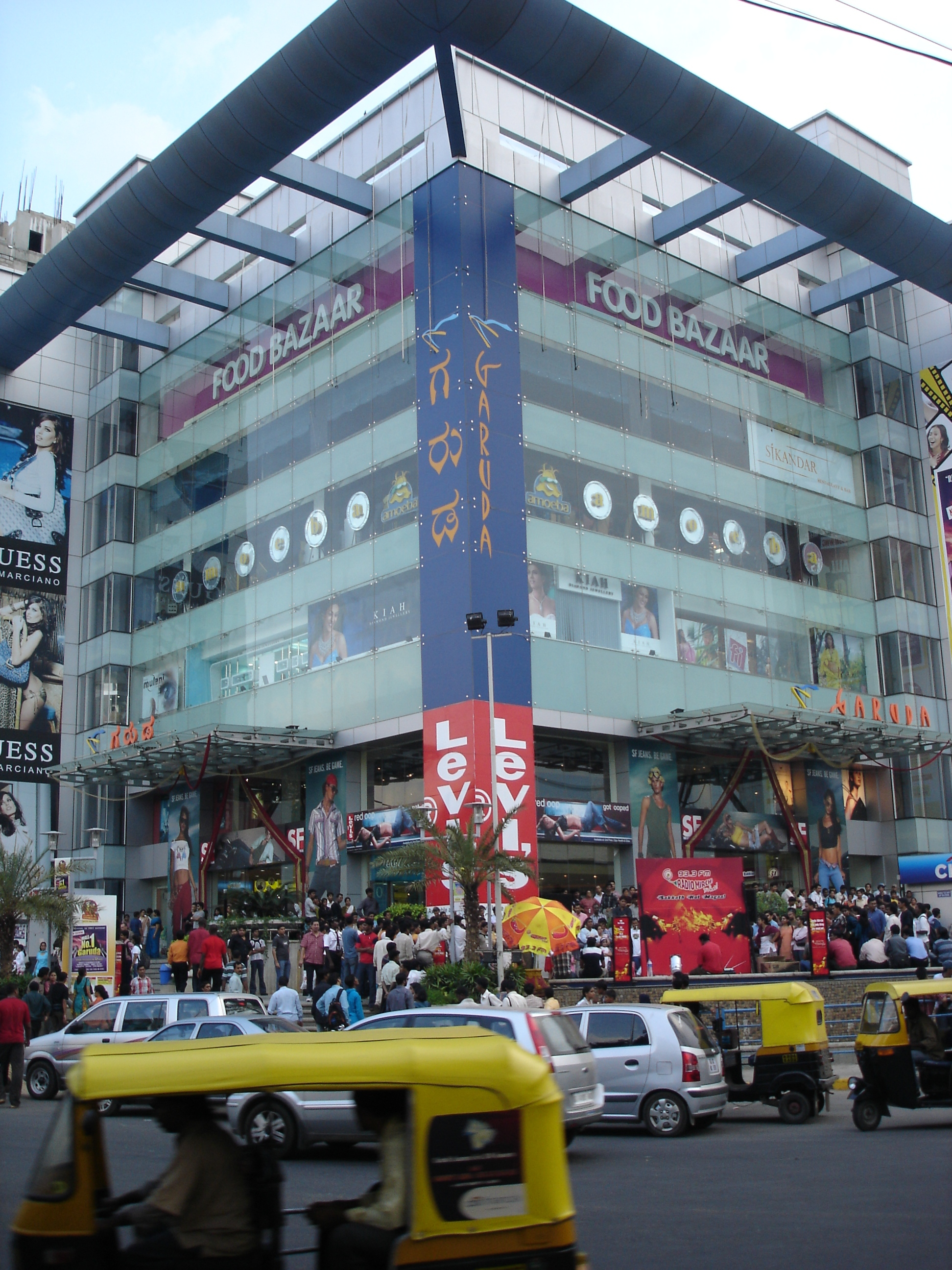
- Garuda mall entrance
- Location: Bangalore, Karnataka, India
- Coordinates: 12.970236°N 77.60975°E
- Address: Magrath Road
- Opened: May 2005
- Developer: Maverick Holdings and Investments
- Owner: Uday Garudachar land owned by Bruhat Bengaluru Mahanagara Palike
- Num. of stores: 120
- Floor area: 126,000 m^{2} (1,360,000 sq ft)
- Floors: 6
- Parking: Multistorey Parking lot
- Public transit: Purple at MG Road
- Website: garudamall.in

Garuda Mall is the premier shopping mall in the city of Bangalore, India, which is also home to the city's second oldest Shoppers Stop branch, and the oldest one in the city which is attached to a mall. It is situated on Magrath Road at the heart of the central business district in Bangalore, near Brigade Road. The mall has opened another branch in the Heritage City, Mysore near K. R. Circle. Another branch in Kochi with French cuisine and heritage.

== Site and built-up area ==
The Garuda mall is spread out over 126,000 m^{2} (1,360,000 sq ft) and includes 30,000 m^{2} (320,000 sq ft) of shopping and entertainment space on six floors and 180 stores.

== Mall facilities ==
- Retail stores
- Entertainment/activity centers
- Multiplex cinemas (Inox)
- Multi-storey parking
- Food court
- Multi-cuisine restaurants
- Bangalore's second oldest Shoppers Stop branch, and the oldest one in the city attached to a mall (the oldest one dating back to 1995 is a multi-storey building called Raheja Point opposite the same mall which is now Ashok Nagar HomeStop)

== Controversies ==
The mall has come under criticism for its safety measures as the ThyssenKrupp lift in the mall had crashed in 2005 and, in a separate incident, a boy had died of fall from a higher floor in 2007.

Garuda Mall is built on the land owned by Bruhat Bengaluru Mahanagara Palike (BBMP), and the two parties have a history of conflicts over profit sharing. The BBMP and Garuda Mall have a memorandum of agreement on a 48%-52% basis.

In January 2011, the BBMP Standing Committee (Markets) decided to carry out a surprise inspection of the mall. According to the Committee chairman and Basaveshwaranagar Ward S corporator SH Padmaraj, they had received complaints of "building deviation by the mall-owner". Padmaraj alleged that the mall was cheating BBMP while housing more than 80 shops on a single floor, while paying a monthly rent of ₹ 3.5 million to the BBMP for only 80 shops. He also alleged that the mall had encroached upon a stormwater drain and had converted a parking lot into a food court, violating the agreement. The mall's majority owner Uday Garudachar claimed that the committee members had no right to conduct an inspection without his permission. He also alleged that the inspection was carried out because he had refused the corporators' demand for a bribe.

== See also ==
- The Forum
- Mantri Square
- Bangalore Central
- List of shopping malls in India
