= Explocity =

Explocity Private Limited
- Founder: Ramjee Chandran
- Number of locations: India, Dubai, New York City
- Website: explocity.com

Explocity Pvt Ltd is a media and publishing company headquartered in Bangalore. The company was formed by Ramjee Chandran. Explocity has city based publications across India, New York state and Dubai.

== Corporate history ==
Prior to the inception of Explocity, Chandran first began a Bangalore-based magazine, Bangalore This Fortnight, in 1989. This was followed by the launch of the Bangalore Monthly and the Bangaloremag.com. The internet had just begun its journey in the late 1990s in India, when Chandran created Explocity.com in 1999. Some of the initial funding was from Rupert Murdoch's News Corp. Explocity.com has content includes events, restaurants, hotel listings, shopping, nightlife and sightseeing in cities like New York City, Dubai, Bangalore, Chennai, Hyderabad, Mumbai, New Delhi and Kolkata.

The Explocity guide (formerly known as CityInfo), was the next product from Explocity, which provides information on restaurants, places to visit, shopping, in cities around the world. It then began publishing lifestyle magazines like 080 (Bangalore), 044 (Chennai) and 040 (Hyderabad), followed by 022 (Mumbai) and 011 (Delhi). A daily newsletter, MyTime, was also created. Explocity was one of the first companies in the world to introduce the software called Pagician for their digital magazines. Explocity also launched a city Movies Guide website online called Explocity Movies. Explocity also partners with Kingfisher (beer) to bring out the Kingfisher Explocity Great Food and Nightlife Guides.

== Products and events ==
Explocity's weekend dining newsletter FirstFoodie was written about in IMPACT magazine's story about media houses in India that cater to food and beverages in January 2013.

Explocity launched EXEC (now known as Executive Traveller) - reportedly, India's first magazine for business travellers - in April 2010. A couple of years later, EXEC tied up with a smartphone content provider to serve its content on the iPhone, iPad and Android smartphones and tablet devices.

Of recent times, Explocity has been under the active management of Sol Mooney Media, a venture started by Explocity founder Ramjee Chandran.

Explocity launched Explocity Podcasts in 2022. The Literary City with Ramjee Chandran is a podcast focused on language and words.

In April 2022, Explocity re-launched BangaloreMag and Explocity Bangalore Guide in digital form.
