= Sayaun Thunga Phulka =

National anthem of Nepal

English: Hundreds of Flowers
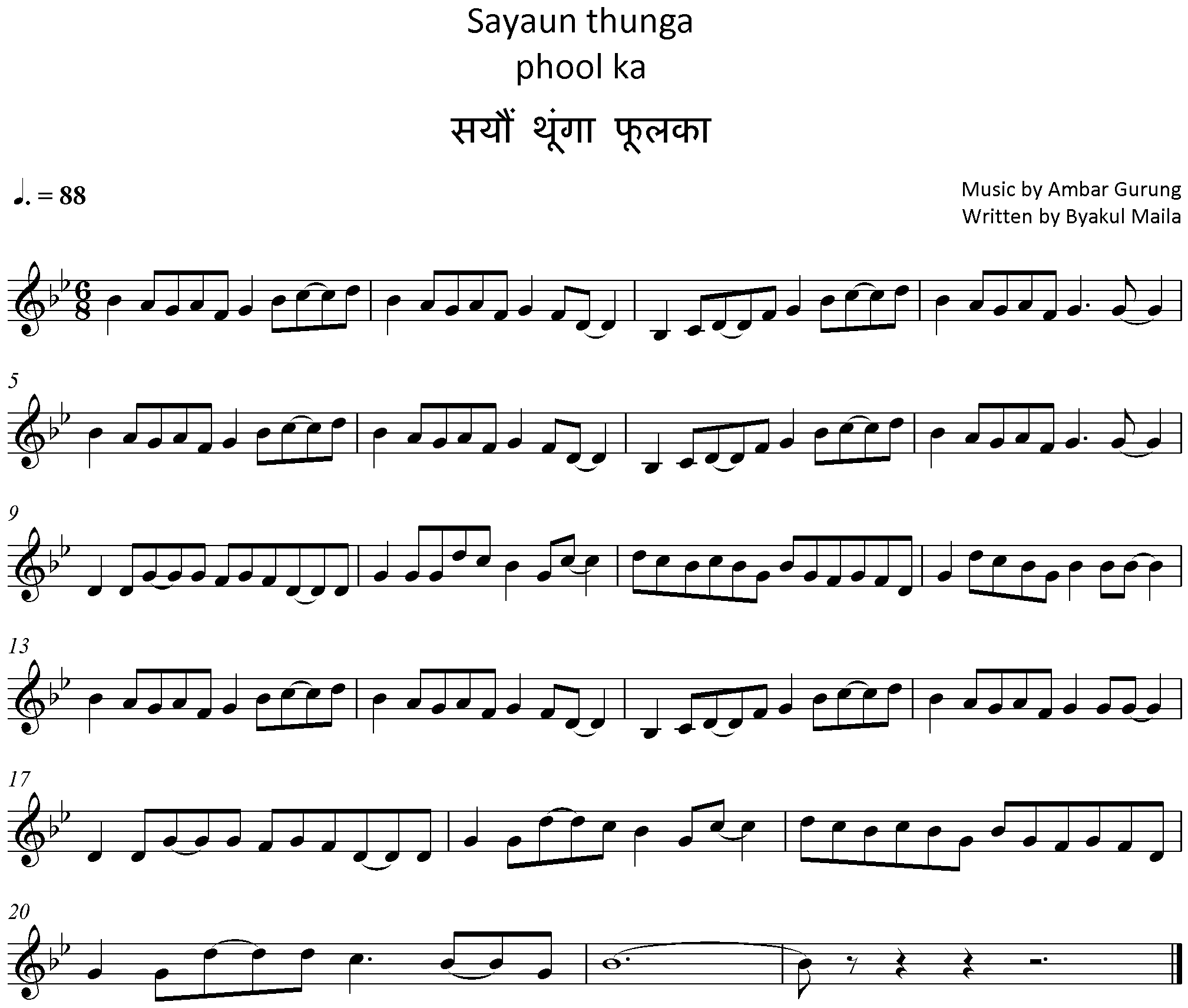
- Sheet music
- National anthem of Nepal
- Lyrics: Byakul Maila, 2007
- Music: Amber Gurung, 2007
- Published: 2007
- Adopted: 3 August 2007
- Preceded by: "Shriman Gambhir"

Audio sample
- Instrumental rendition in G minor performed by the U.S. Navy Band: file; help

"Sayaun Thunga Phulka" (Note: Nepali: सयौँ थुँगा फूलका, pronounced [sʌjʌ̃ũ̯ tʰũŋɡa ɸulka]; transl. 'Hundreds of Flowers') is the national anthem of Nepal. It was officially adopted as the anthem on 3 August 2007 during a ceremony held at the conference hall of National Planning Commission, inside Singha Durbar, by the speaker of the interim parliament, Subas Chandra Nemwang. The previous national anthem "Shriman Gambhir" was adopted in 1962 and relinquished with the abolition of the monarchy.

The lyrics of the national anthem were penned by the poet Pradip Kumar Rai, who went by his alias Byakul Maila. The music was composed by Amber Gurung. The theme of the national anthem praises Nepalese sovereignty, unity, courage, pride, scenic beauty, progress, peace, cultural and biological diversity, and respect. In August 2016, the BBC ranked Nepal's national anthem third in its list of Rio 2016: The most amazing national anthems, citing its musical differences compared to other anthems.

== Lyrics ==
=== Nepali official ===
Devanagari script

𝄆 सयौं थुँगा फूलका हामी, एउटै माला नेपाली
सार्वभौम भई फैलिएका, मेची-महाकाली। 𝄇

प्रकृतिका कोटि-कोटि सम्पदाको आँचल
वीरहरूका रगतले स्वतन्त्र र अटल।

ज्ञानभूमि, शान्तिभूमि, तराई, पहाड, हिमाल
अखण्ड यो प्यारो हाम्रो मातृभूमि नेपाल।

बहुल जाति, भाषा, धर्म, संस्कृति छन् विशाल
अग्रगामी राष्ट्र हाम्रो, जय जय नेपाल।।

Transliteration

𝄆 Sayaű thűgā phūlkā hāmī, euṭai mālā nepālī
Sārvabhaum bhai phailiekā, Mecī-Mahākālī. 𝄇

Prakṛtikā koṭi-koṭi sampadāko ā̃cala,
Vīrharūkā ragatale, svatantra ra aṭala.

Gyānabhūmi, śāntibhūmi Tarāī, Pahāḍ, Himāla
Akhaṇḍa yo pyāro hāmro mātṛibhūmi Nepāla.

Bahul jāti, bhāṣā, dharma, sãskṛti chan viśāla
Agragāmī rāṣṭra hāmro, jaya jaya Nepāla.

IPA transcription (Note: See Help:IPA/Nepali, Nepali phonology, and Schwa deletion in Indo-Aryan languages.)

𝄆 [sʌ.jʌ̃ũ̯ t̪ʰũŋ.ɡa ɸul.ka ɦã.mi | eu̯.t̠ʌi̯ ma.la ne.pa.li |]
[saɾ.bʌ.βʌ̃ũ̯m βʌi̯ ɸʌi̯.li.e.ka | me.t͡si ma̤.ɦa.ka.li ‖] 𝄇

[pɾʌ.kɾi.t̪i.ka ko.t̠i ko.t̠i | sʌ̃m.pʌ.d̪a.ko ã.t͡sʌ.lʌ |]
[biɾ.ɦʌ.ɾu.ka ɾʌ.ɡʌ.t̪ʌ.le | so.t̪ʌ̃n̪.t̪ɾʌ ɾʌ ʌ.t̠ʌ.lʌ ‖]

[ɡjã.nʌ.βũ.mi sãn̪.t̪i.βũ.mi | t̪ʌ.ɾai̯ pa̤.ɦaɾ̠ ɦĩ.ma.lʌ |]
[ʌ.xʌ̃n̠.d̠ʌ jo pja.ɾo ɦãm.ɾo | ma.t̪ɾi.βũ.mi ne.pa.lʌ ‖]

[bʌ̤.ɦul d͡za.t̪i βa.s̠a d̪ʱʌ̃ɾ̃.mʌ | sʌ̃s.kɾi.t̪i t͡sʰʌ̃n bi.sa.lʌ |]
[ʌɡ.ɾʌ.ɡã.mi ɾas̠.t̠ɾʌ ɦãm.ɾo | d͡zʌ.e d͡zʌ.e ne.pa.lʌ ‖]

=== English translation ===
𝄆 Woven from hundred flowers, we are garland Nepali
Sovereignly extended from Mechi to Mahakali. 𝄇

Millions of natural beauties, history like a shawl
Bloods of the braves make it free and immotile.

Land of knowledge and peace, the plains, hills and mountains
One piece beloved country, our motherland Nepal.

Peoples, languages, religions and cultures are incredible
This progressive nation of ours, victory to thee, Nepal!

== History ==
Following the unanimous decision on 19 May 2006, by the interim House of Representatives of the Kingdom of Nepal, the old national anthem was discontinued. Subsequently, on 30 November 2006, the National Anthem Selection Task Team selected a new composition written by poet Byakul Maila. This anthem was chosen from among 1,272 submissions received from across the country. It was officially approved on 20 April 2007.

Later, on 3 August 2007, "Sayaun Thunga Phulka" was officially declared as Nepal's national anthem by the House of Representatives.

Musically, the anthem spans one octave, with both its lowest and highest notes at D.

== Protocol ==
The public performance of the anthem is regulated by the law. All citizens must stand and show respect to the flag while radio and television stations shall broadcast the anthem during "startup" and "closedown".

== Controversy ==
During the selection process, Byakul Maila was required to prove he was not a royalist and encountered difficulties when it was discovered that he had once edited a book of poetry that contained a contribution from King Gyanendra.

Some of Nepal's Maoist leaders preferred a stronger, more revolutionary anthem akin to the communist "Internationale", and even took their own CDs into the final selection meeting hoping to overturn Byakul Maila's and Amber Gurung's effort.

== See also ==
- "Shriman Gambhir", the national anthem of the Kingdom of Nepal
