= Ramjee Chandran =

Journalist and author

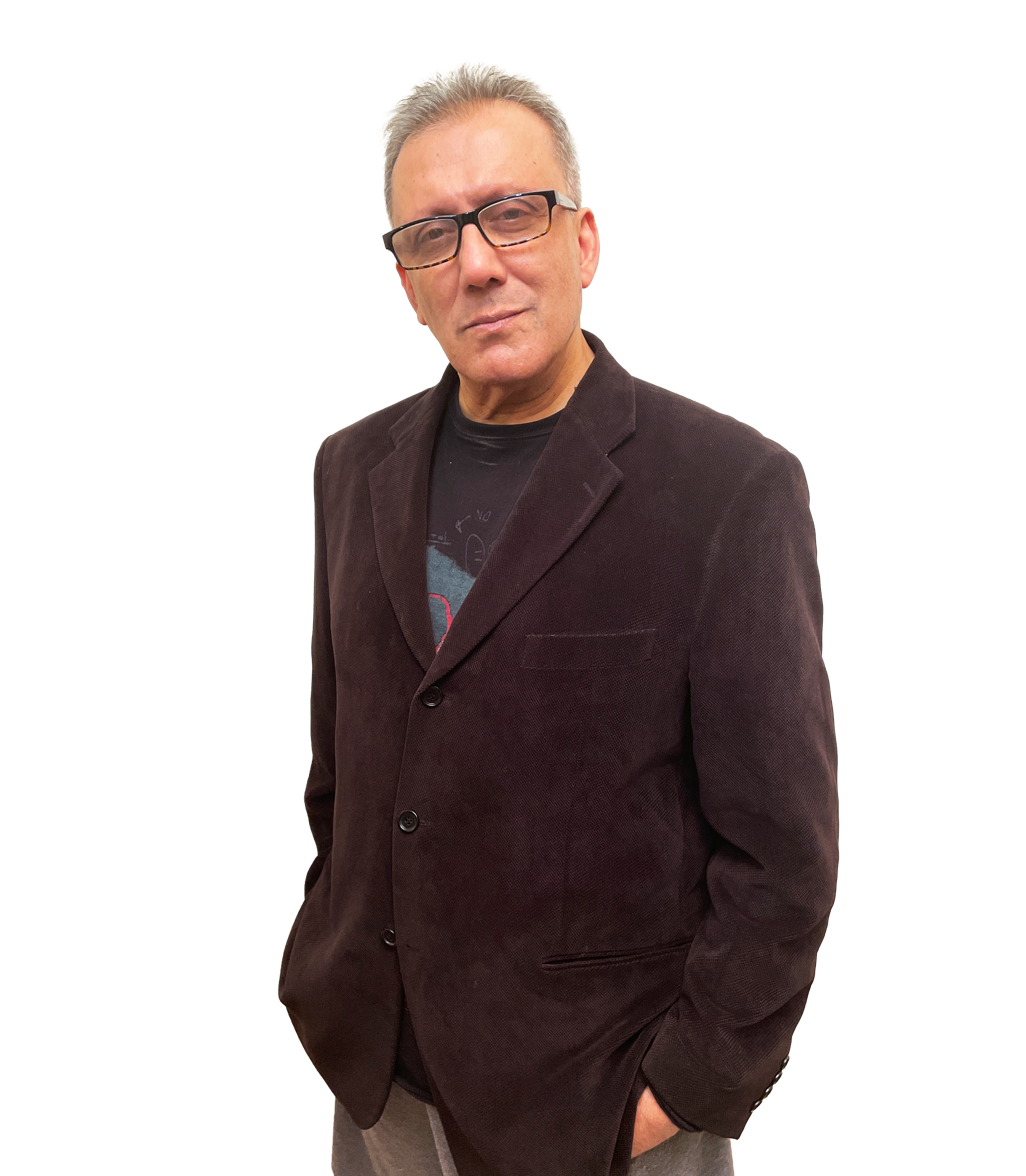
- Born: Bangalore, India
- Occupation: Journalist
- Years active: 1989–present
- Known for: Explocity & Bengaluru: The Comprehensive History to the Dawn of Independence
- Website: http://explocity.com/

Ramjee Chandran is a journalist and author. Chandran has been the Editor of Explocity a fortnightly magazine since 1998. According to The Daily Telegraph, Explocity is partly owned by Rupert Murdoch. He is the author of Bengaluru: The Comprehensive History to the Dawn of Independence. Chandran is also the host of the podcasts The Literary City With Ramjee Chandran and the History of Bangalore.

== Career ==
Ramjee Chandran launched several magazines devoted to the city of Bangalore, India, notably The Bangalore Monthly and Bangalore Weekly. Also Chandran wrote several columns for various newspapers and magazines. Prior to the inception of Explocity, Chandran first began a Bangalore-based magazine, "Bangalore This Fortnight", in 1989. This was followed by the launch of the Bangalore Monthly and the Bangaloremag.com. The internet had just begun its journey in the late 1990s in India, when Chandran created Explocity.com in 1999. Some of the initial funding was from Rupert Murdoch's News Corp. Explocity has content includes events, restaurants, hotel listings, shopping, nightlife and sightseeing in cities like New York City, Dubai, and Indian cities.

Chandran is also a jazz guitarist and has performed with other acclaimed musicians on stage.

Ramjee Chandran was featured in the New York podcast, Destination On The Left, as a media expert.

Chandran was invited by Bangalore International Centre to moderate a panel comprising leading animal activists and representatives from the Bangalore city corporation.

Ramjee Chandran started The Literary City with Ramjee Chandran, under Explocity Podcasts in 2022.

For the 2022 Bangalore Literature Festival, Ramjee Chandran was invited to conduct sessions with Mallika Sarabhai and journalist, Barkha Dutt. He has appeared in later editions of the Bangalore Literature Festival.

In 2025, Ramjee Chandran's novel, "For No Reason At All", a roman-a-clef, was released by Penguin and has been favourably reviewed.

Bengaluru: The Comprehensive History to the Dawn of Independence will be released on 23rd November, 2026 by Penguin Viking.

== Awards and honors ==
- Chanakya Award for Innovative Leadership
- Best entrepreneurs from Karnataka, India
