= Gaines (surname) =

Gaines is an English surname of Norman origin.

Notable people with the surname Gaines include:

- Brian R. Gaines (born c. 1938), British systems scientist and engineer
- Cassie Gaines (1948–1977), American singer; backup singer for Lynyrd Skynyrd, sister of Steve
- Charles Gaines (writer) (born 1942), American writer and outdoorsman
- Charles Gaines (basketball) (born 1981), American basketball player
- Chip Gaines (born 1974), American actor, producer, television personality, contractor, and author
- Chris Gaines (1999–1999), fictional alter ego of American country singer Garth Brooks
- Chris Gaines (gridiron football) (born 1965), American football player
- Clarence Gaines (1923–2005), American basketball coach
- Corey Gaines (born 1965), American basketball player and coach
- Smokey Gaines (1940–2020), American basketball player
- David Gaines (racing driver) (1963–1990), American race car driver
- Earl Gaines (1935–2009), American blues singer
- Edmund P. Gaines (1777–1849), United States Army officer, brother of George Strother
- Ernest J. Gaines (1933–2019), African American author
- George Gaines (set decorator) (1933–1986), American art director
- George Strother Gaines (1784–1873), American leader in the Mississippi Territory, brother of Edmund
- Grady Gaines (1934–2021), American blues tenor saxophonist
- Greg Gaines (disambiguation), multiple people
- Grenville Gaines (1854–1922), American politician and lawyer
- Innis Gaines (born 1998), American football player
- Joanna Gaines (born 1978), American interior decorator, television personality, and author
- John Gaines (disambiguation), multiple people
- Jon Gaines II (born 1999), American football player
- Lloyd L. Gaines, (born 1911, disappeared 1939), American civil rights litigant
- Max Gaines (1894–1947), American comic book publisher, father of William
- Randal Gaines (born 1953), American politician
- Reece Gaines (born 1981), American basketball player
- Richard Gaines (1904–1975), American actor
- Riley Gaines (born 2000), American women's swimmer and activist
- Rowdy Gaines (born 1959), American swimmer
- Roy Gaines (1937–2021), American blues guitarist
- Ruth Gaines-Shelton (1872–1934), American educator and writer
- Sheldon Gaines (born 1964), American football player
- Sire Gaines (born 2006), American football player
- Stanley F. Gaines (1891–1950), American politician from Mississippi
- Stanley O. Gaines, American psychologist
- Steve Gaines (1949–1977), American musician, guitarist and songwriter for Lynyrd Skynyrd
- Wallace A. Gaines (1858–1940) American businessman, funeral director, and political figure
- Walter Lee Gaines (1881–1950), American dairy scientist
- William Gaines (disambiguation), multiple people
