= Gayane =

Gayane or Gayaneh is an Armenian female name, which may refer to:

- Gayane (given name), a given name
- Saint Gayane, a 4th-century abbess and martyr of the Armenian Apostolic Church
- Saint Gayane Church, an Armenian Apostolic church in Etchmiadzin
- Gayane (ballet), a 1942 ballet by Aram Khachaturian

== See also ==
- Gayne (disambiguation)
