= D'Ewes baronets =

Extinct baronetcy in the Baronetage of England

- Escutcheon of the d'Ewes baronets of Stowlangtoft Hall
- Creation date: 1641
- Status: extinct
- Extinction date: 1731

The d'Ewes Baronetcy, of Stowlangtoft Hall in the County of Suffolk, was a title in the Baronetage of England. It was created on 15 July 1641 for the antiquary and politician Sir Simonds d'Ewes. He was the son of Paul d'Ewes (d.1624), whose mural monument with a kneeling effigy survives in Stowlangtoft Church, one of the six Clerks in Chancery. The title became extinct on the death of the 4th Baronet in 1731.

== Origins ==
Paul d'Ewes was the great-grandson of Gerard des Ewes, lord of Kessell, then in the Duchy of Gelderland. His son, Adrian d'Ewes, (d.1551) was the first to settle in England. Adrian's son Gerard d'Ewes, father of Paul, was lord of the manor of Gaynes in Essex. Paul D'Ewes was one of the six Clerks in Chancery and in 1612 purchased from Sir Robert Ashfield the manor of "Stow-Langetot" (Stowlangtoft) in Suffolk. He married Cecilia Simonds, sole daughter and heiress of Richard Simonds of "Croxden, Dorset", by whom he had a son and heir Sir Simonds d'Ewes, 1st Baronet (1602–1650), as well as six daughters, including Mary, who married the witch hunter Sir Thomas Bowes.

== d'Ewes baronets, of Stowlangtoft Hall (1641) ==
- Sir Simonds d'Ewes, 1st Baronet (1602–1650)
- Sir Willoughby d'Ewes, 2nd Baronet (c. 1650–1685)
- Sir Simonds d'Ewes, 3rd Baronet (c. 1670–1722)
- Sir Jermyn d'Ewes, 4th Baronet (1688–1731)
