= Khas music =

Type of Nepali music

Khas Music originates from the practices of the Nepali Khas society.

Castes like Damai, Gandharbha, Gaine play a number of instruments on occasions such as marriages, birth and other festive occasions of the Khas people. Due to modernization this practice has almost disappeared and mass electronic media like television, internet is quickly taking over as means of entertainment especially in the Kathmandu valley. Khas music features instruments such as the madal and bansuri, along with folk songs and devotional bhajans, and dances such as Sangini and Balan.

== See also ==
Music of Nepal
