= Saint Gayane Church =

7th-century Armenian church in Vagharshapat

Church of Saint Gayane
- Գայանե եկեղեցի
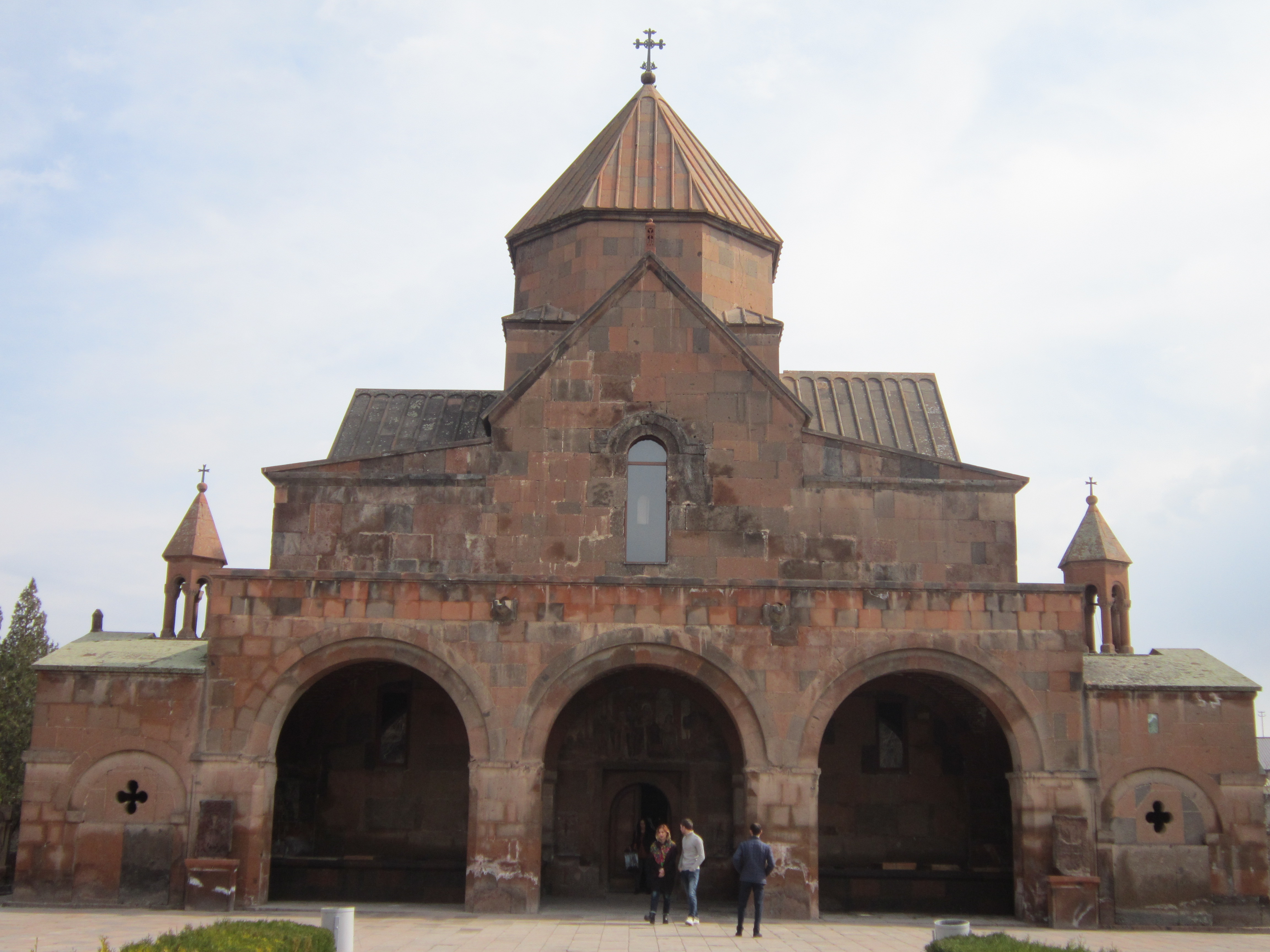
- Saint Gayane Church

- Location within Armenia

Religion
- Affiliation: Armenian Apostolic Church

Location
- Location: Vagharshapat (Etchmiadzin), Armavir Province, Armenia
- Coordinates: 40.157419°N 44.291986°E

Architecture
- Style: Armenian
- Groundbreaking: 630
- UNESCO World Heritage Site
- Official name: Cathedral and Churches of Echmiatsin and the Archaeological Site of Zvartnots
- Type: Cultural
- Criteria: (ii) (iii)
- Designated: 2000 (24th session)
- Reference no.: 1011-002
- Region: Western Asia

The Saint Gayane Church (Armenian: Սուրբ Գայանե եկեղեցի; pronounced Surb Gayane yekeghetsi) is a 7th-century Armenian church in Vagharshapat (Etchmiadzin), the religious center of Armenia. It is located within walking distance from the Etchmiadzin Cathedral of 301. St. Gayane was built by Catholicos Ezra I in the year 630.

The church was constructed on a site already associated with the memory of Saint Gayane, linking the 7th-century building to Armenia’s earlier Christian tradition. Its design has remained unchanged despite partial renovations of the dome and some ceilings in 1652. Because of this, the church is considered one of the better-preserved examples of early medieval Armenian church architecture

Gayane was the name of an abbess who was martyred with other nuns by Tiridates III of Armenia in the year 301, and subsequently made a saint of the Armenian Apostolic Church. In 2000, Saint Gayane Church was listed in the UNESCO World Heritage Sites along with historical churches of Vagharshapat.

== History ==
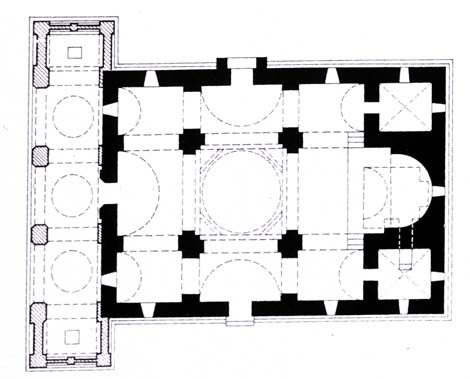
Plan of Gayane church

Saint Gayane Church sits on the site where the aforementioned saint was martyred during the time of the conversion of Armenia to Christianity in the year 301 AD. The fifth century Armenian historian Agathangelos wrote that the young and beautiful Hripsime, who at the time was a Christian nun in Rome, was to be forcefully married to the Roman emperor Diocletian. She and the abbess Gayane among other nuns fled the tyrant emperor and left to Armenia. The pagan Armenian King Trdat received a letter from Diocletian in which he described her beauty. Trdat discovered where the nuns were hiding, and fell in love with Hripsime and later Gayane. After her refusal of his advances, Hripsime was tortured and martyred at the location of Saint Hripsimé Church, while Gayane was tortured and martyred at this site where the church was later built. The separate locations of these martyrdoms later became important pilgrimage and commemorative sites, with churches marking the places associated with each saint. The remaining group of thirty-eight unnamed nuns were martyred at the location of Shoghakat Church. During the time that Hripsime was being tortured, Gayane told her to "be of good cheer, and stand firm" in her faith. King Trdat was to be later converted to Christianity and made it the official religion of the kingdom.

== Architecture ==
Saint Gayane Church is a three-nave domed basilica with an octagonal drum resting on four internal pillars that divide the interior of the church into three naves. The middle sections of the side naves are elevated slightly over the corner ones and roofed with vaults across the building, forming a transversal nave. At the eastern wall of the church's interior is a semicircular apse with a rectangular chamber at either side. Three portals lead into the interior of the building. The main portal enters through the arched portico, while two side entries are located at the north and south walls.

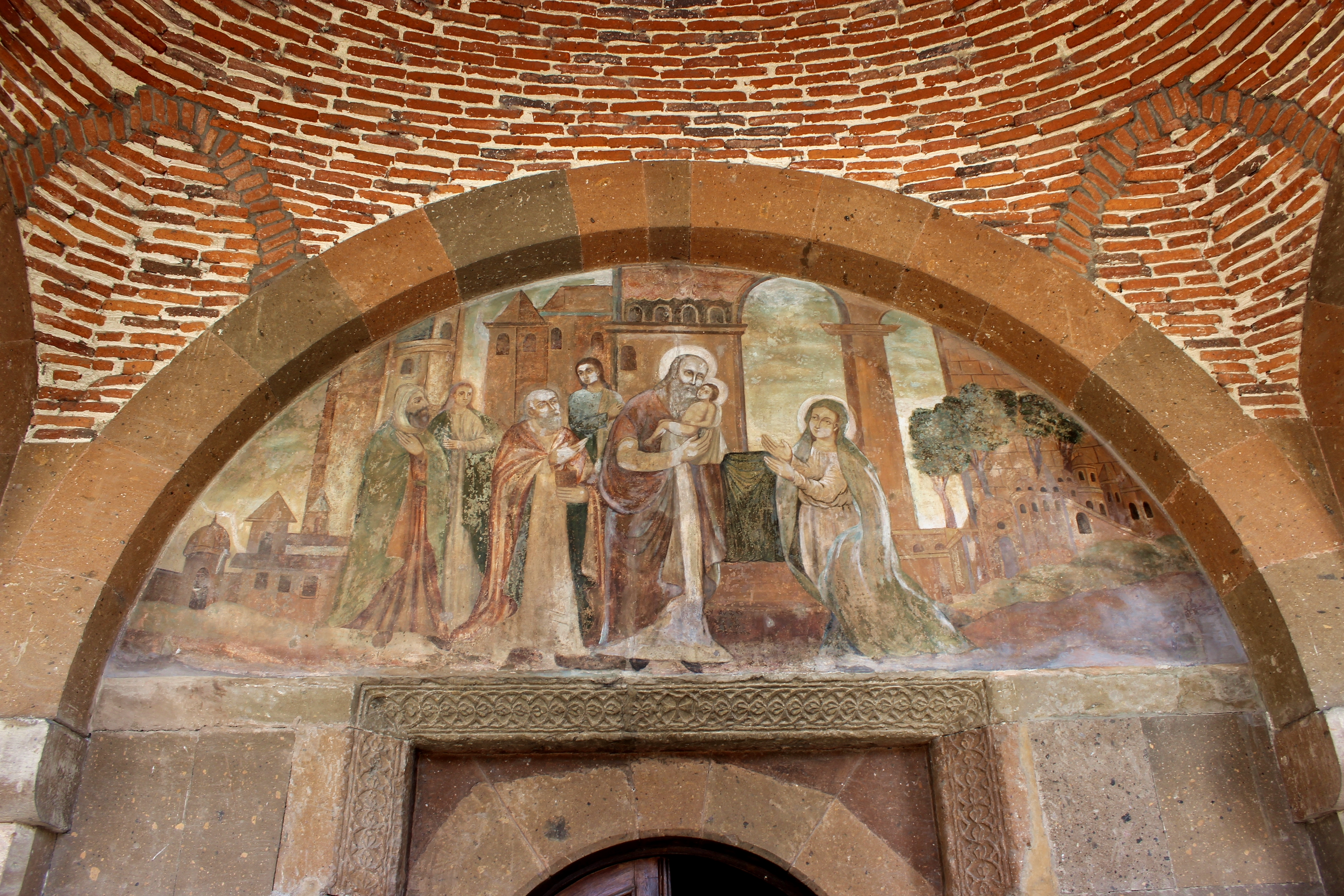
Frescos depicting saints on the tympanum above the door.

The exterior of Saint Gayane differs from the interior in that it has a cruciform-plan gable roof with the drum and dome placed central to the main structure.

An airy, triple-arched portico was added to the western façade of the church in 1683 as the burial place for prominent Armenian clergymen. The gallery is made up of five distinct yet continuous bays, each being open and linked to the one adjacent. Its three central bays have vaulted ceilings and large arched openings that lead to the exterior courtyard. The two side bays are slightly lower in height and are vaulted as well. Each is surrounded by walls at three sides with small quatrefoil windows placed on the exterior walls. Frescos of clergymen adorn niches along the interior walls of the portico while saints are depicted on the fresco of the tympanum above the main door. Six-columned cupolas sit on the roof above the two end bays and may be seen from the exterior.

=== Architectural Significance ===
Saint Gayane Church is architecturally significant because it combines two major church forms: the longitudinal basilica and the centrally domed church. UNESCO describes Saint Gayane as one of the earliest examples in Armenian and early Christian architecture to combine a three-aisled basilica with a central dome. This design allowed the church to keep the long, processional organization of a basilica while also emphasizing the central domed bay

The interior is organized around four free-standing piers that support the central cupola. These piers divide the interior into a central nave and side aisles. The raised cross arms and tall drum of the dome give the exterior a cruciform appearance, even though the building also keeps the rectangular organization of a basilican plan. The transition from the square central bay to the octagonal drum is made through squinches, a structural feature often used in Armenian church architecture to support domes over square spaces.

The plan of Saint Gayane has been described as a synthesis of the earlier three-aisled basilican type and the later central-plan church. Saint Gayane is among the earliest examples of this type and compares its free-standing piers and cross-in-square organization with other 7th-century Armenian churches, including Mren, Bagawan, and Odzun. This makes the church important not only as a shrine connected to Saint Gayane, but also as a major example of the development of Armenian domed church architecture.

== Burials ==
- Arakel Davrizhetsi
- Lusine Zakaryan
- Daniel Bek-Pirumian
- Makhluto

== Gallery ==
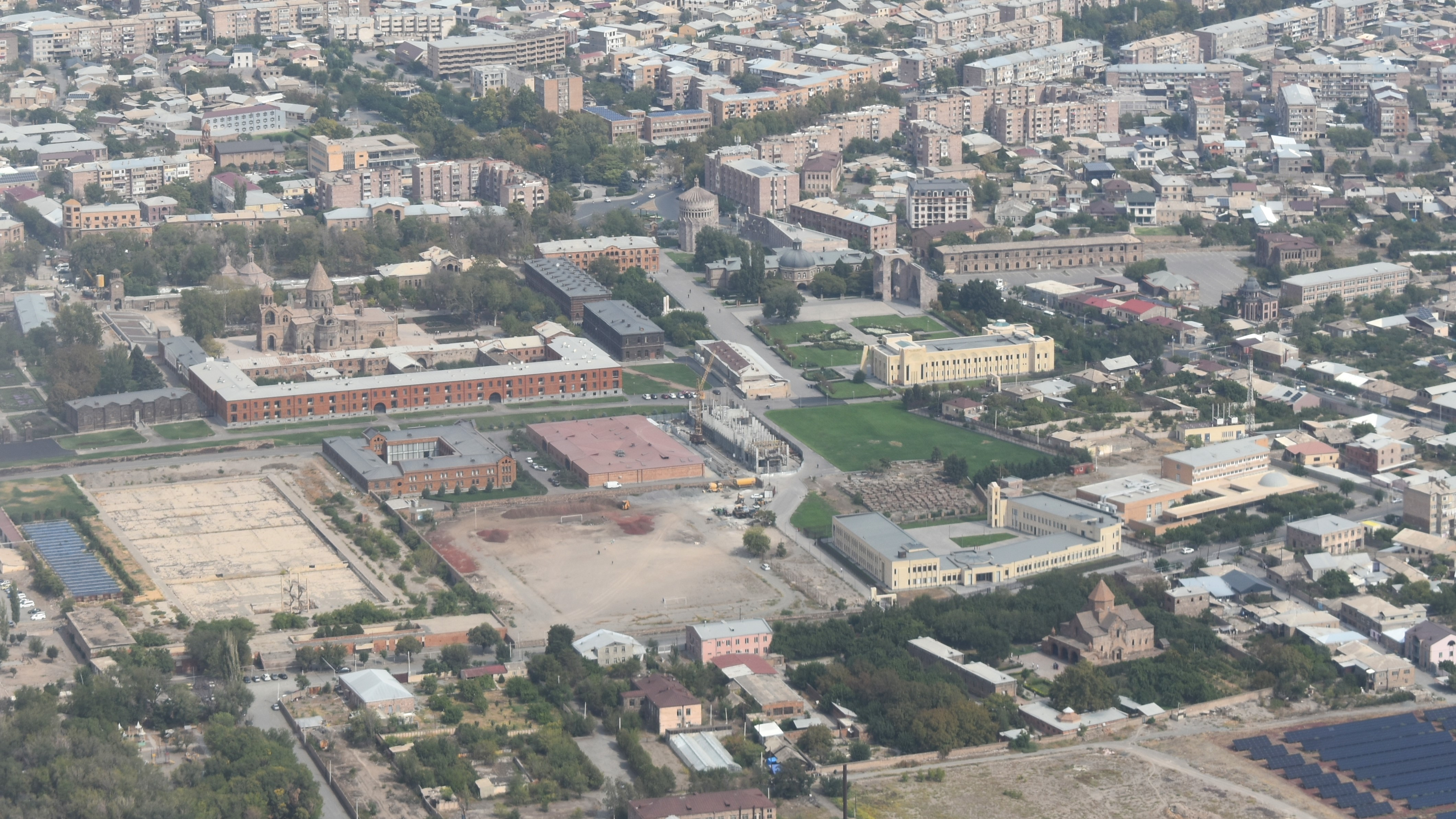
An aerial view of St. Gayane (lower right) and Etchmiadzin Cathedral

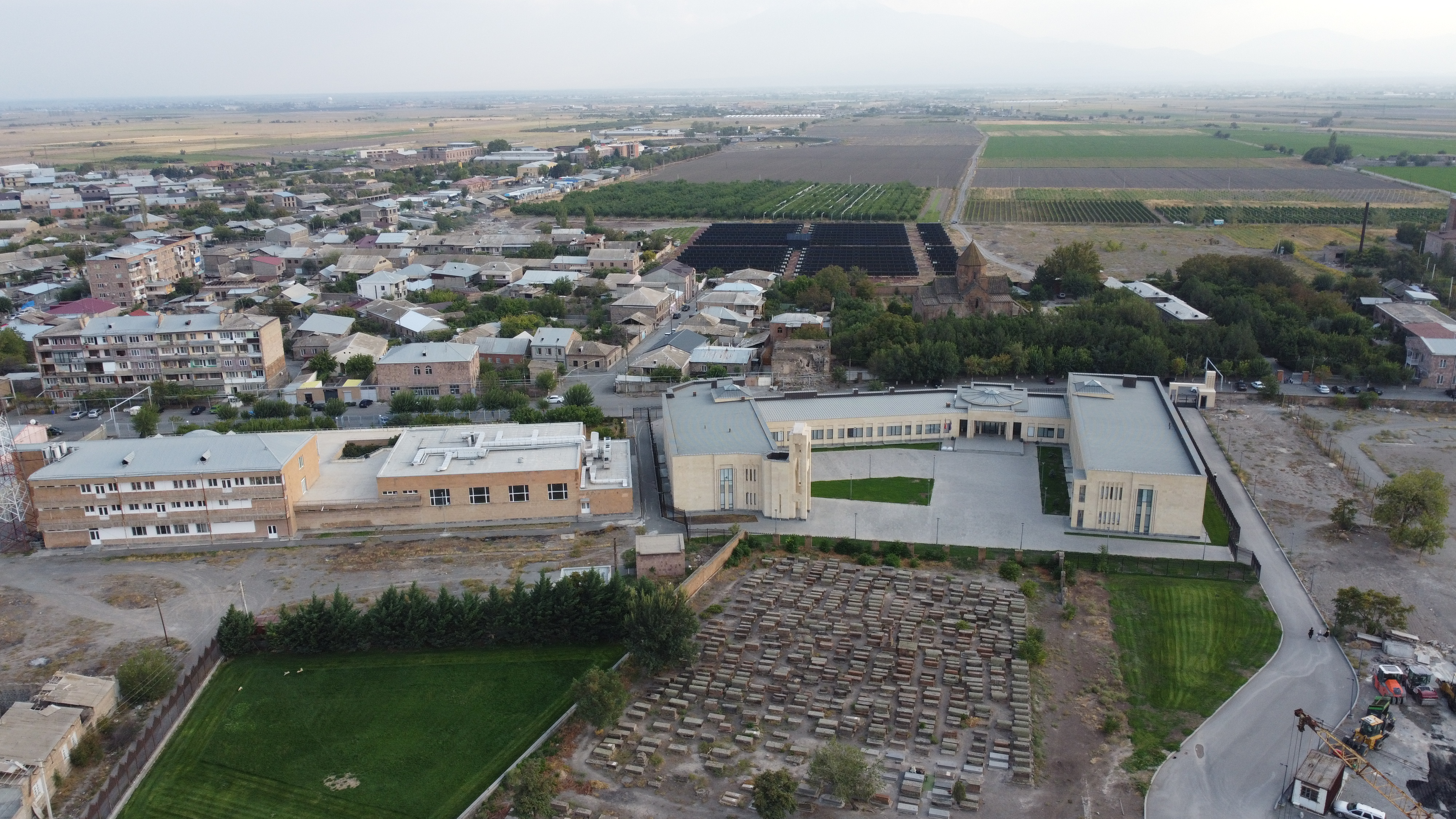
Another aerial view

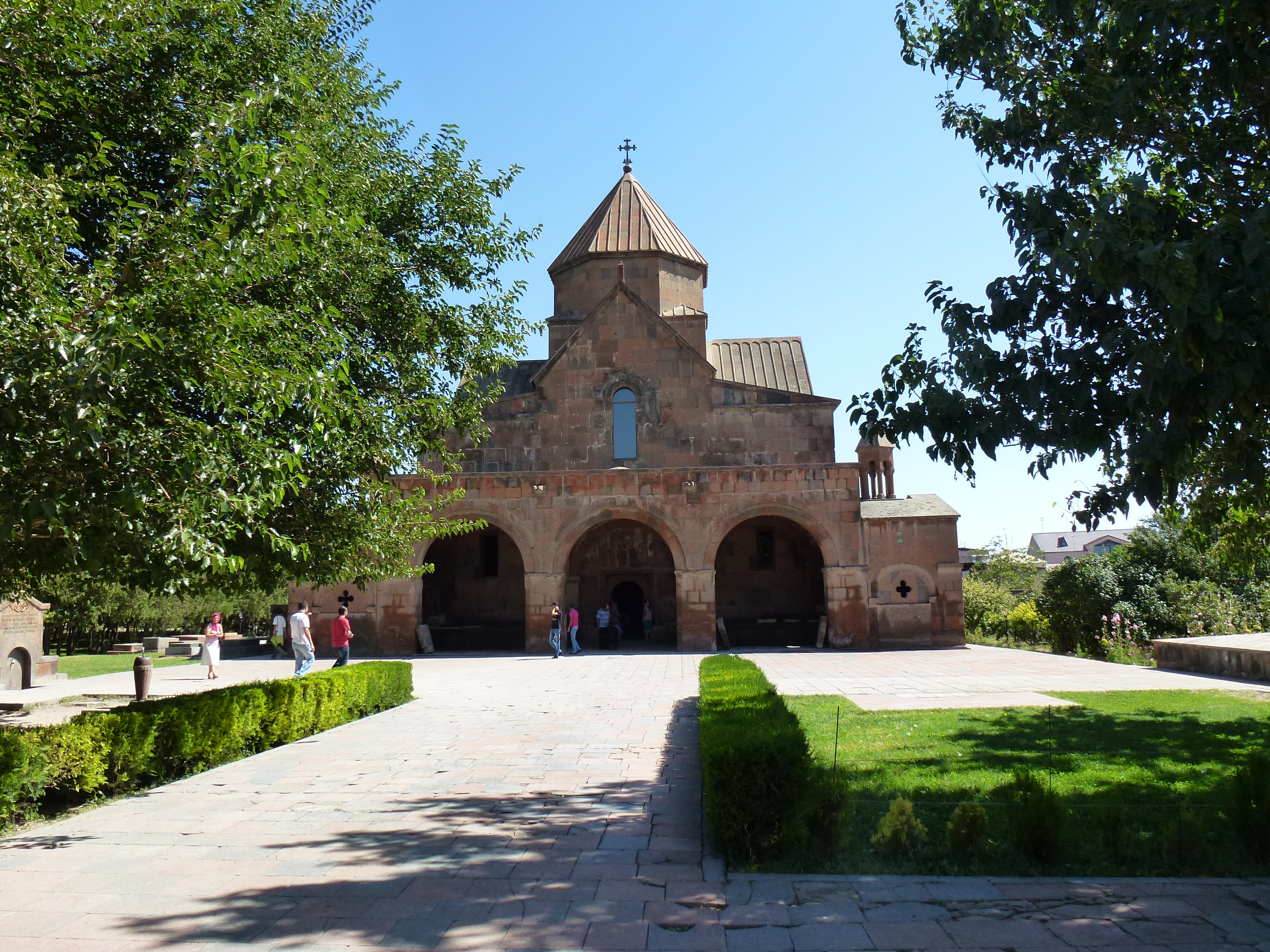

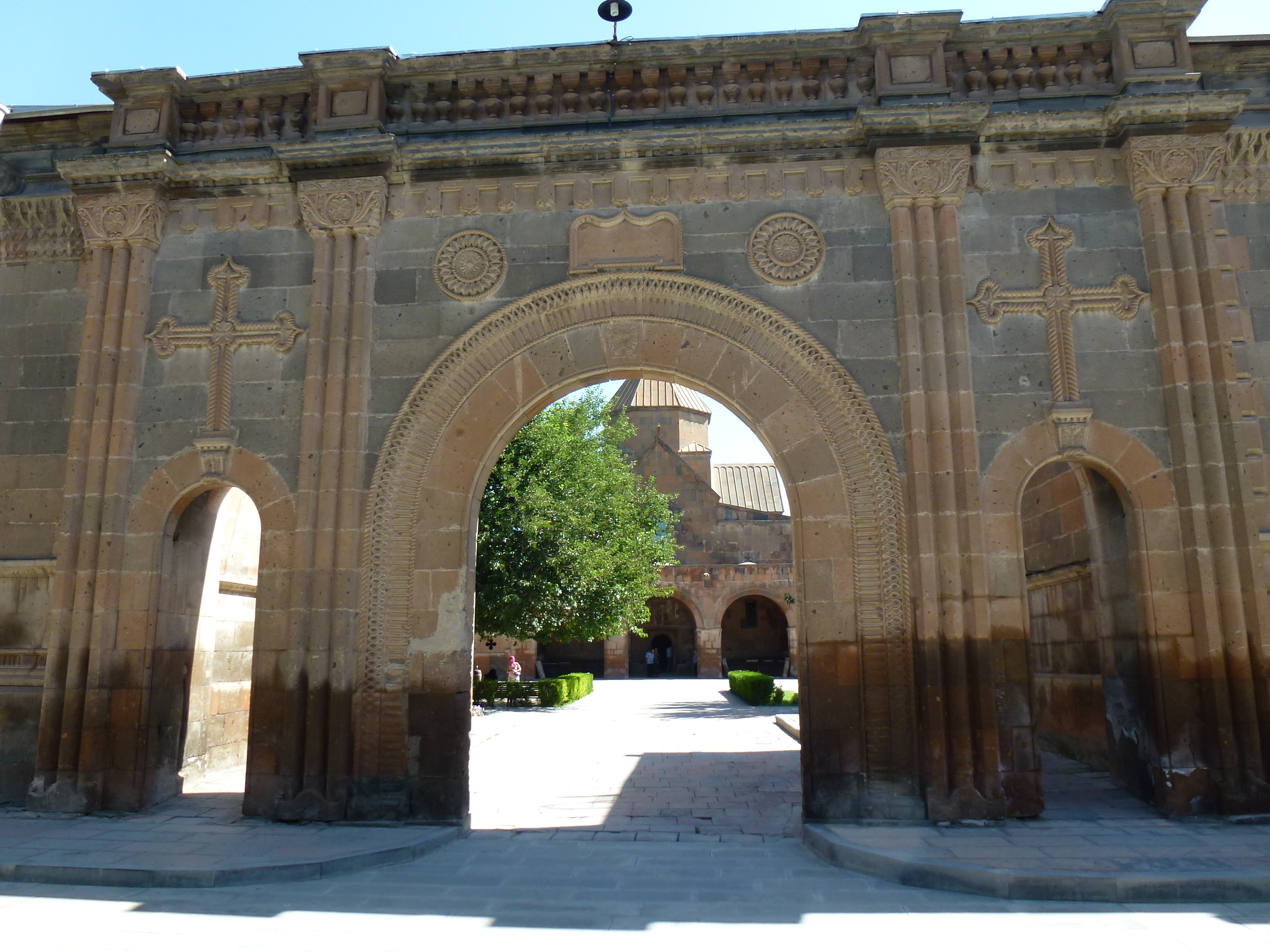

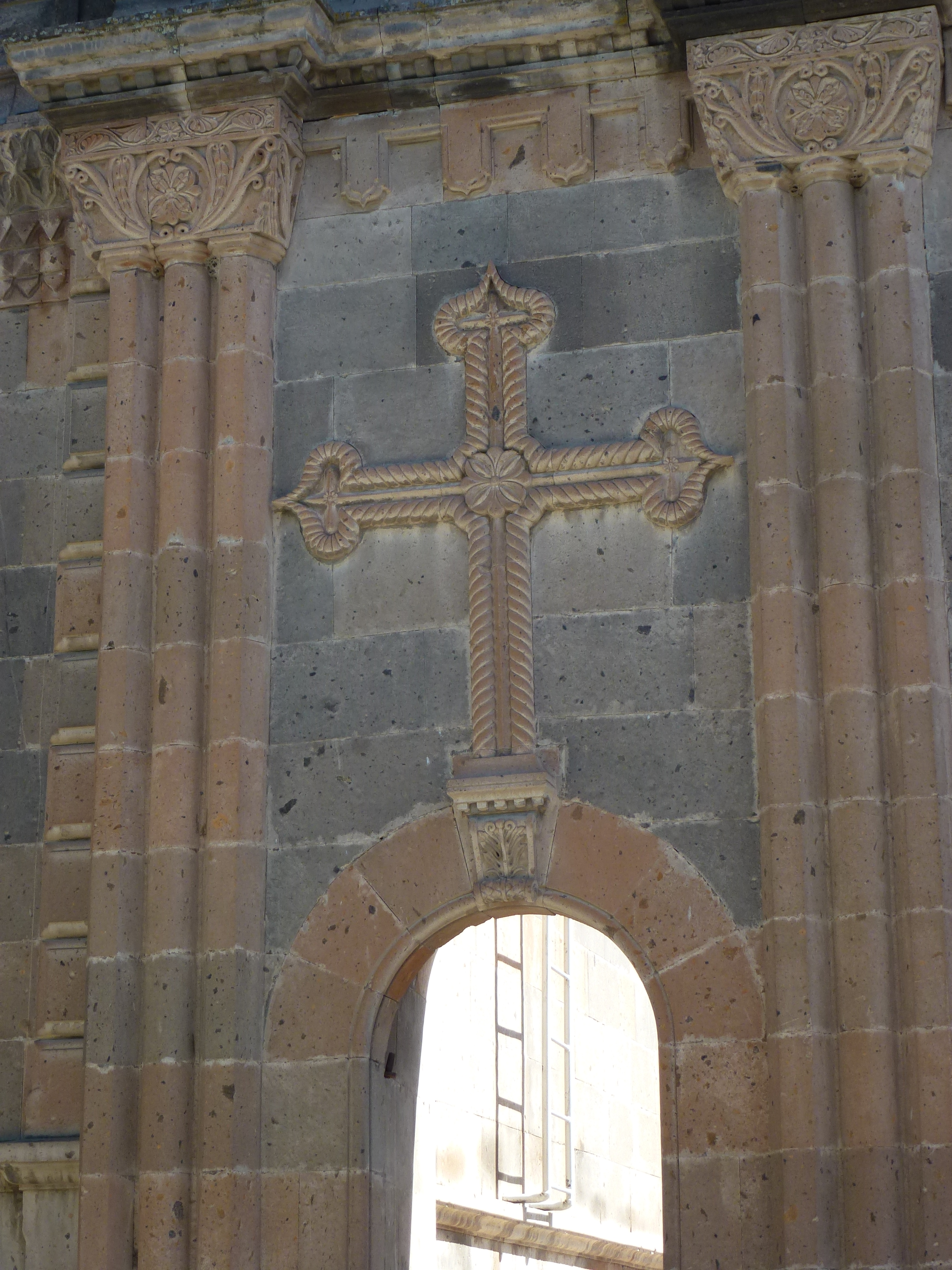

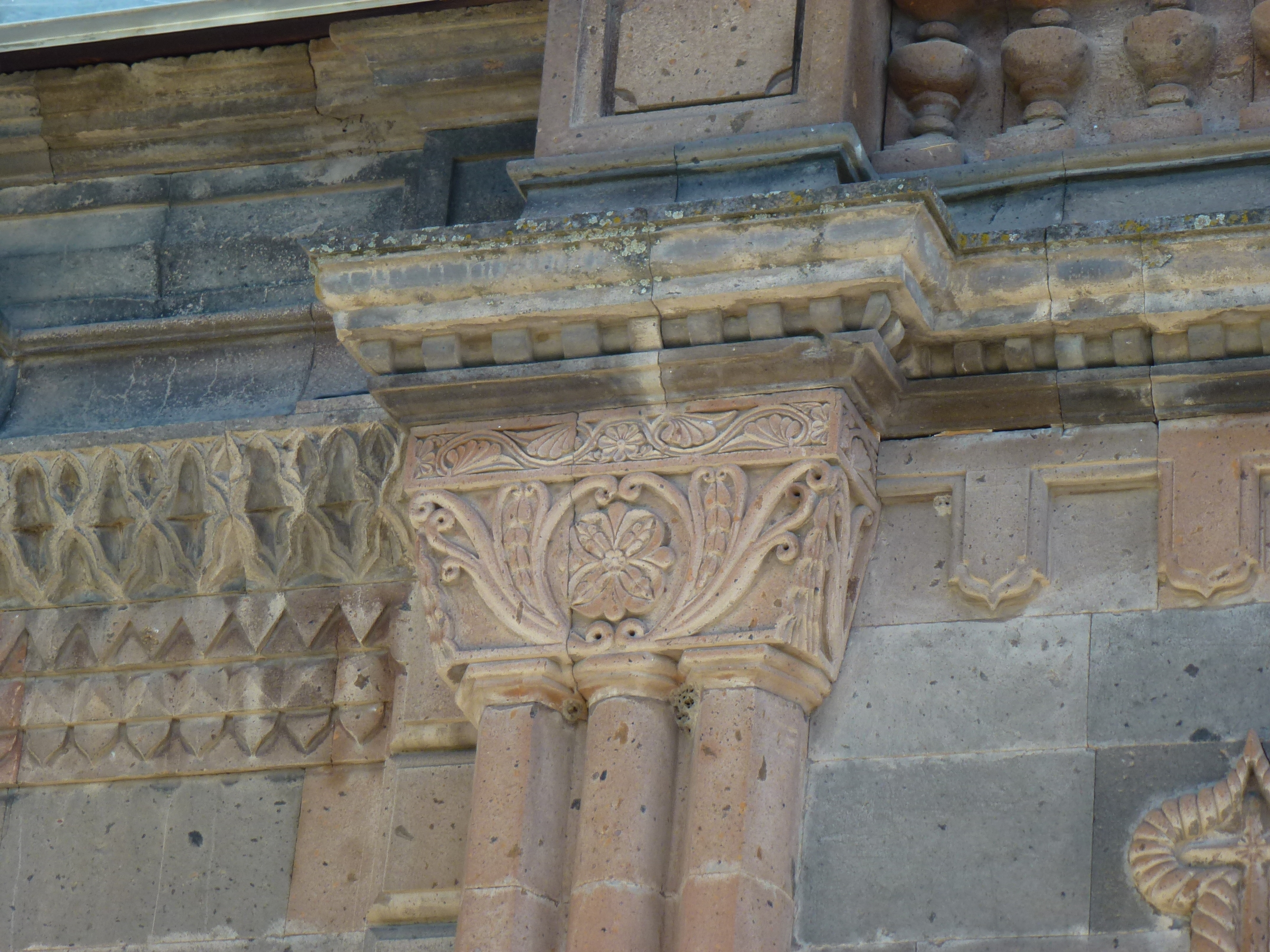

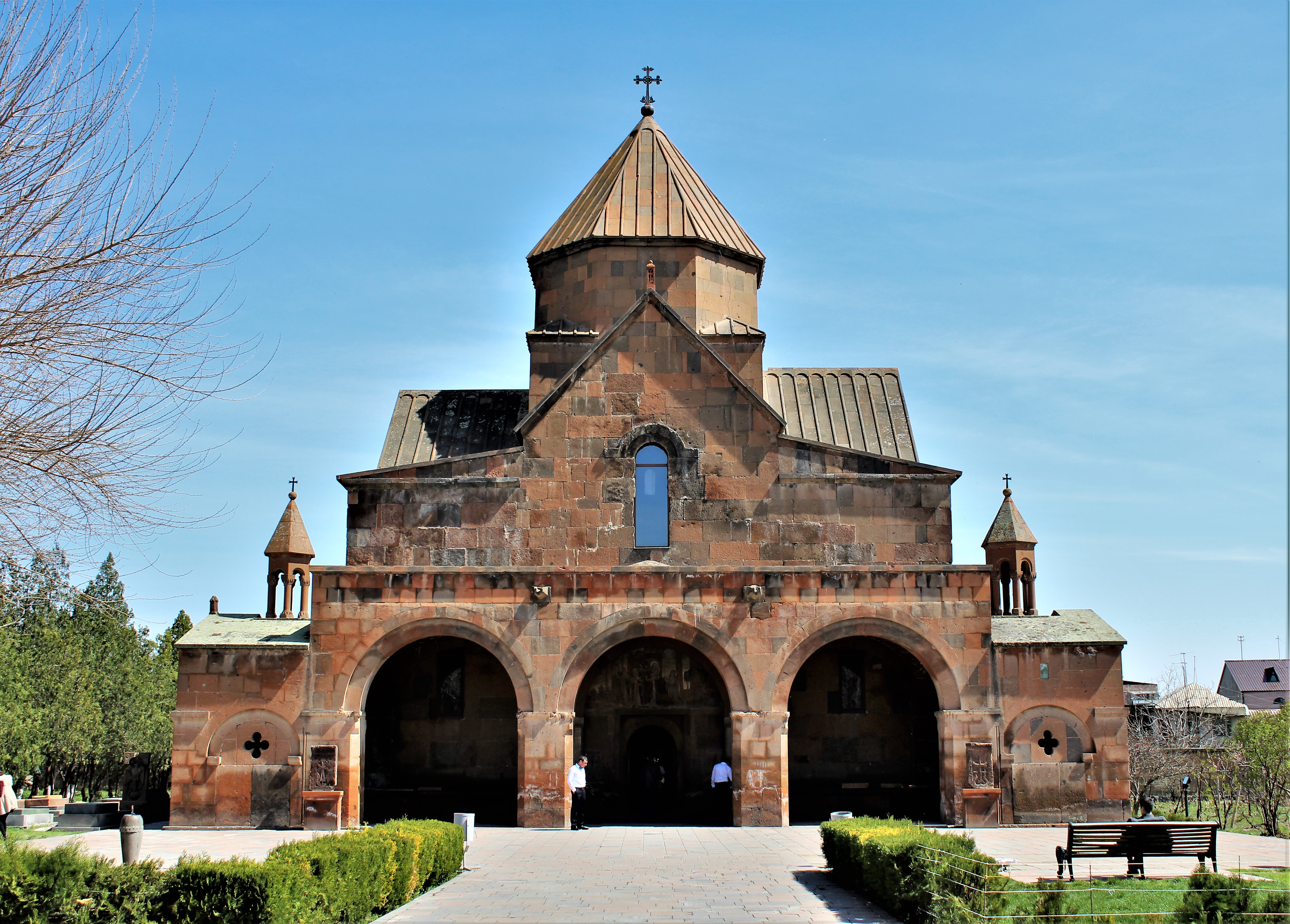

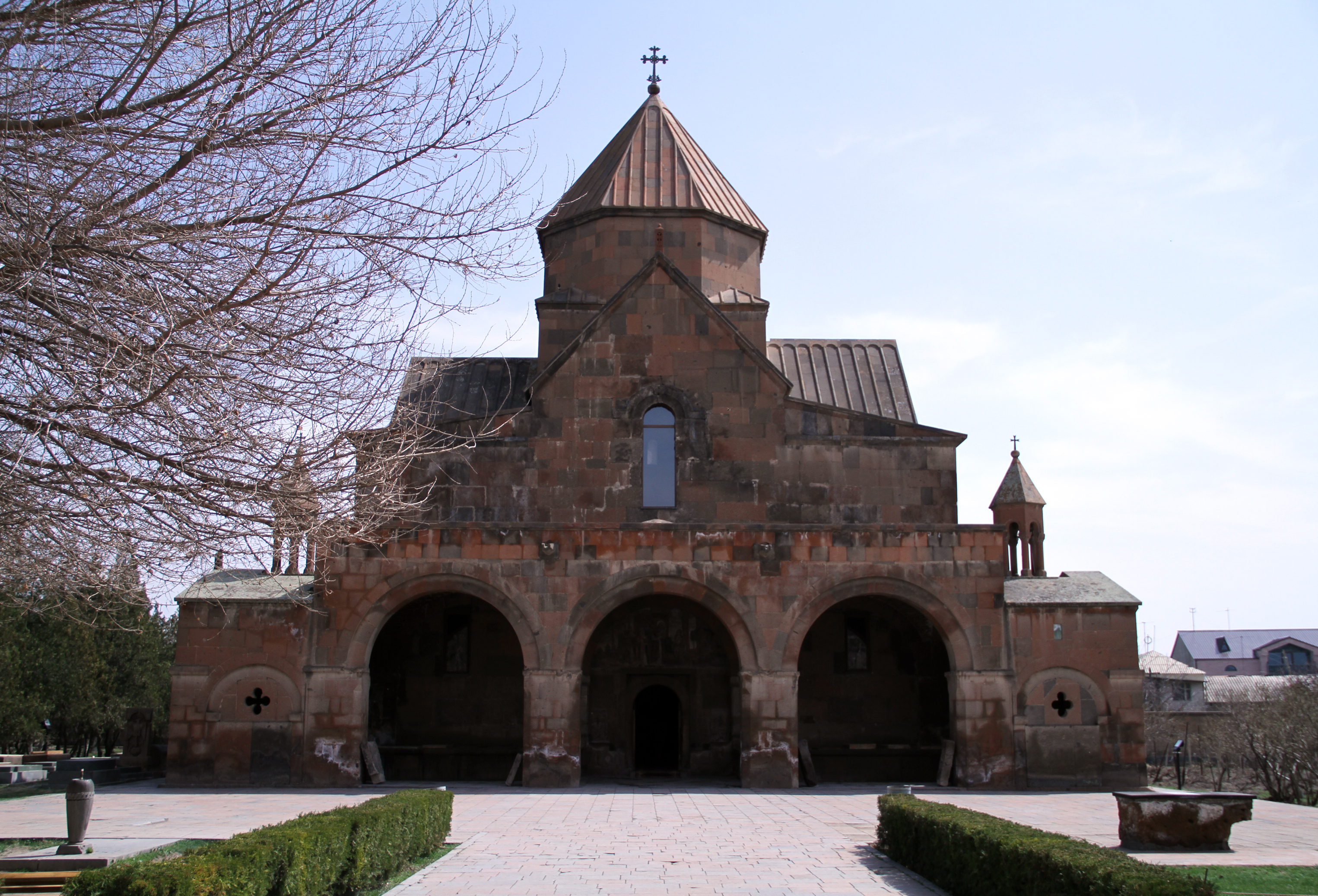
Saint Gayane Church

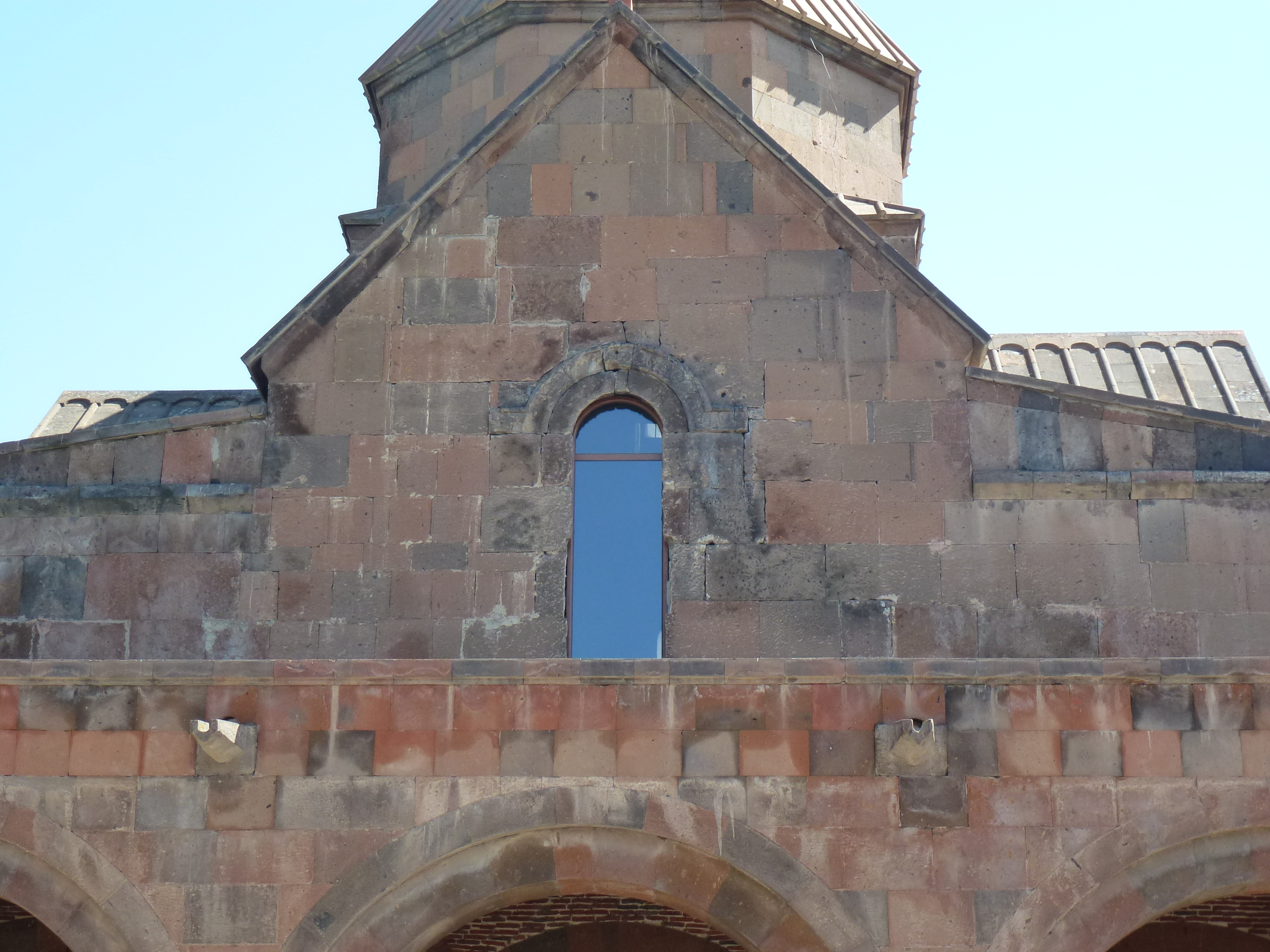

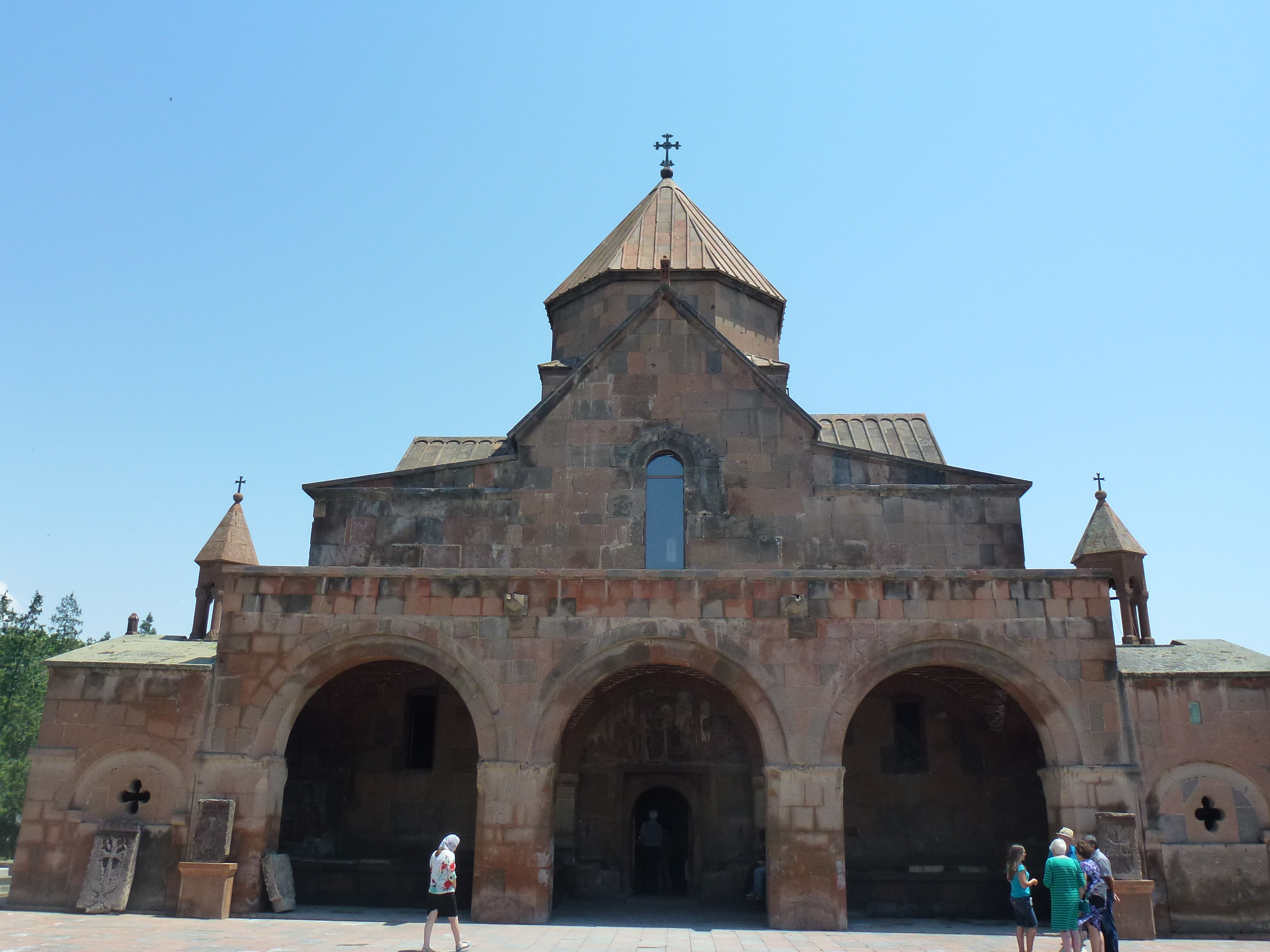

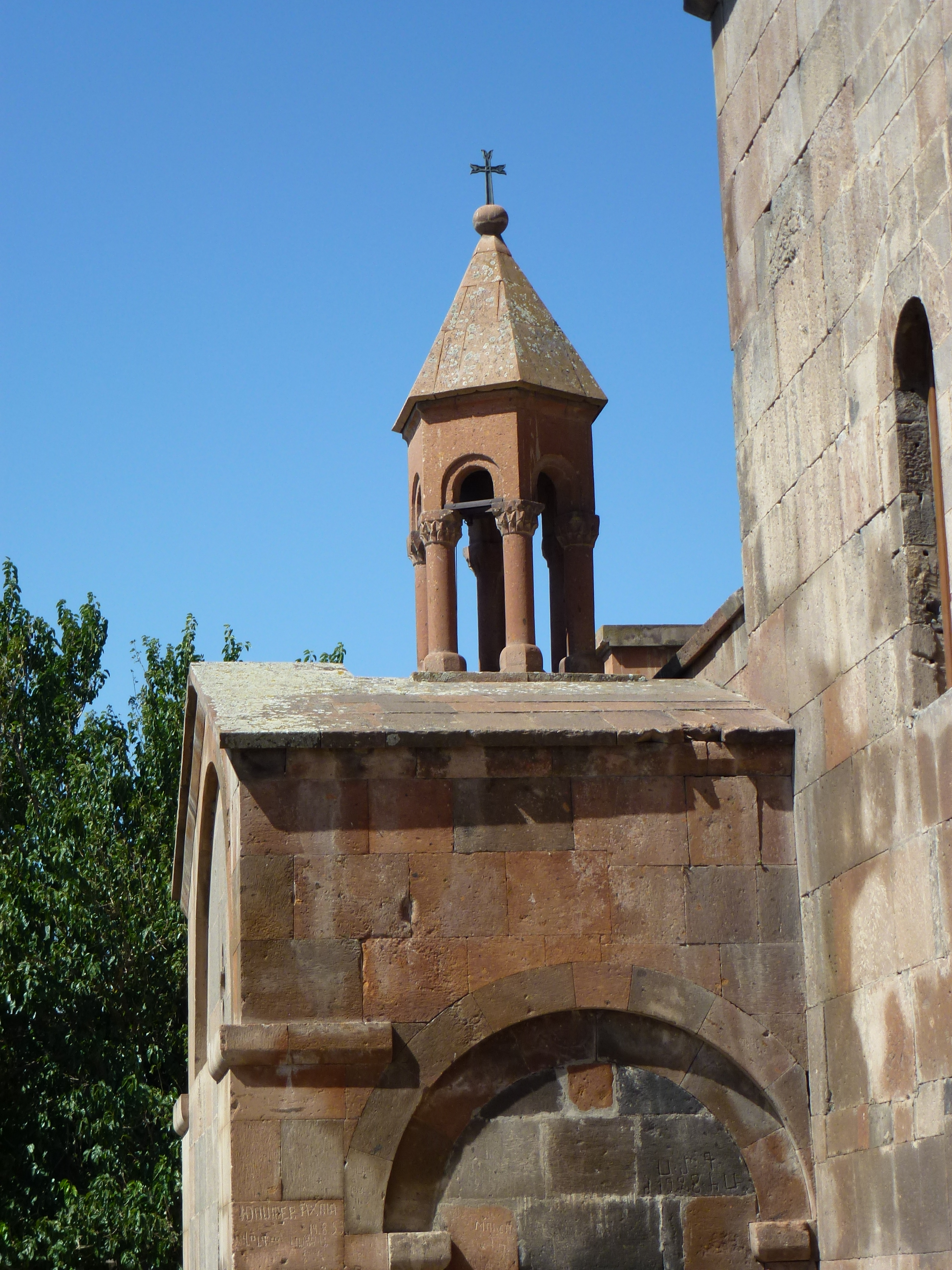

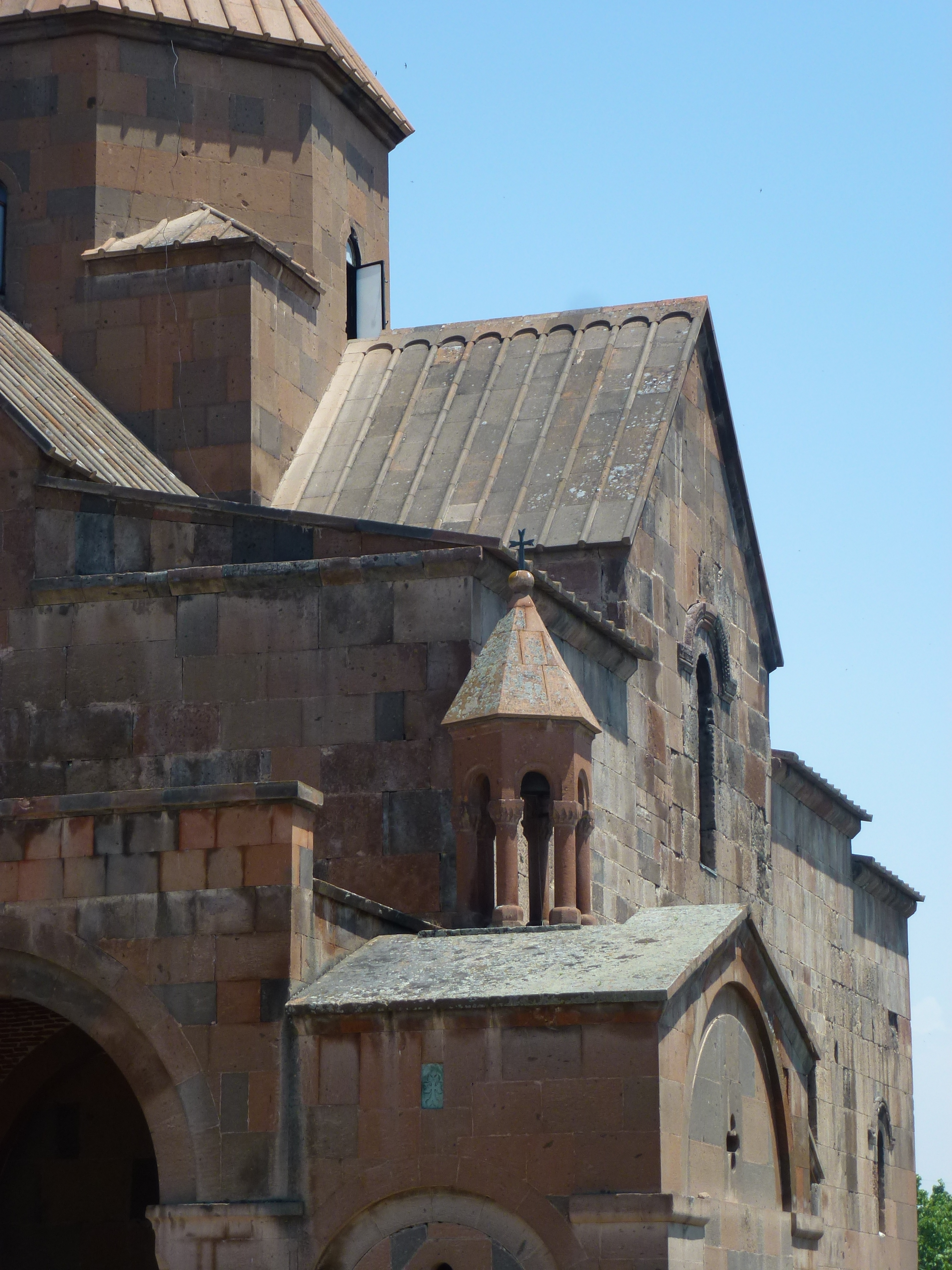

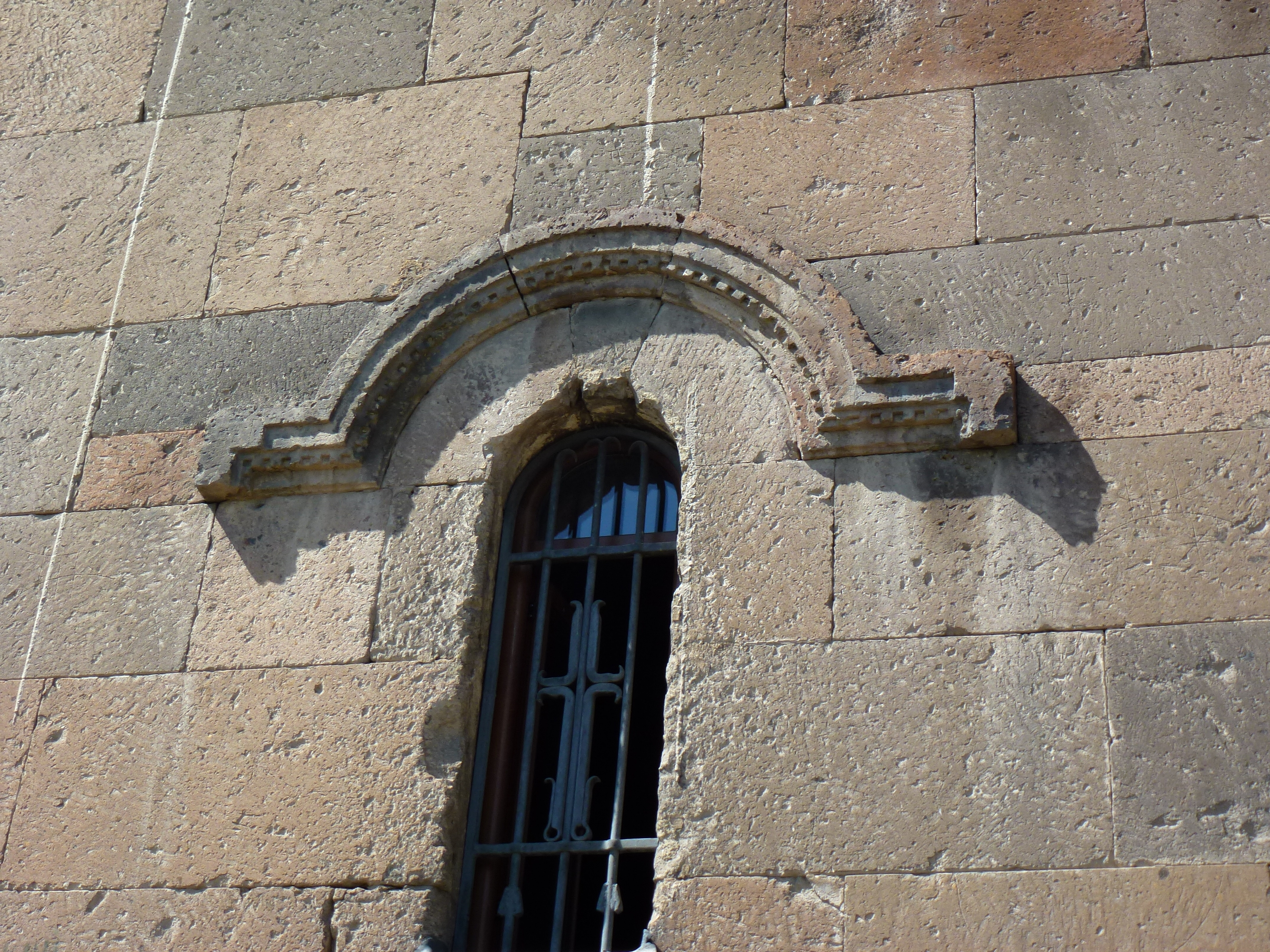

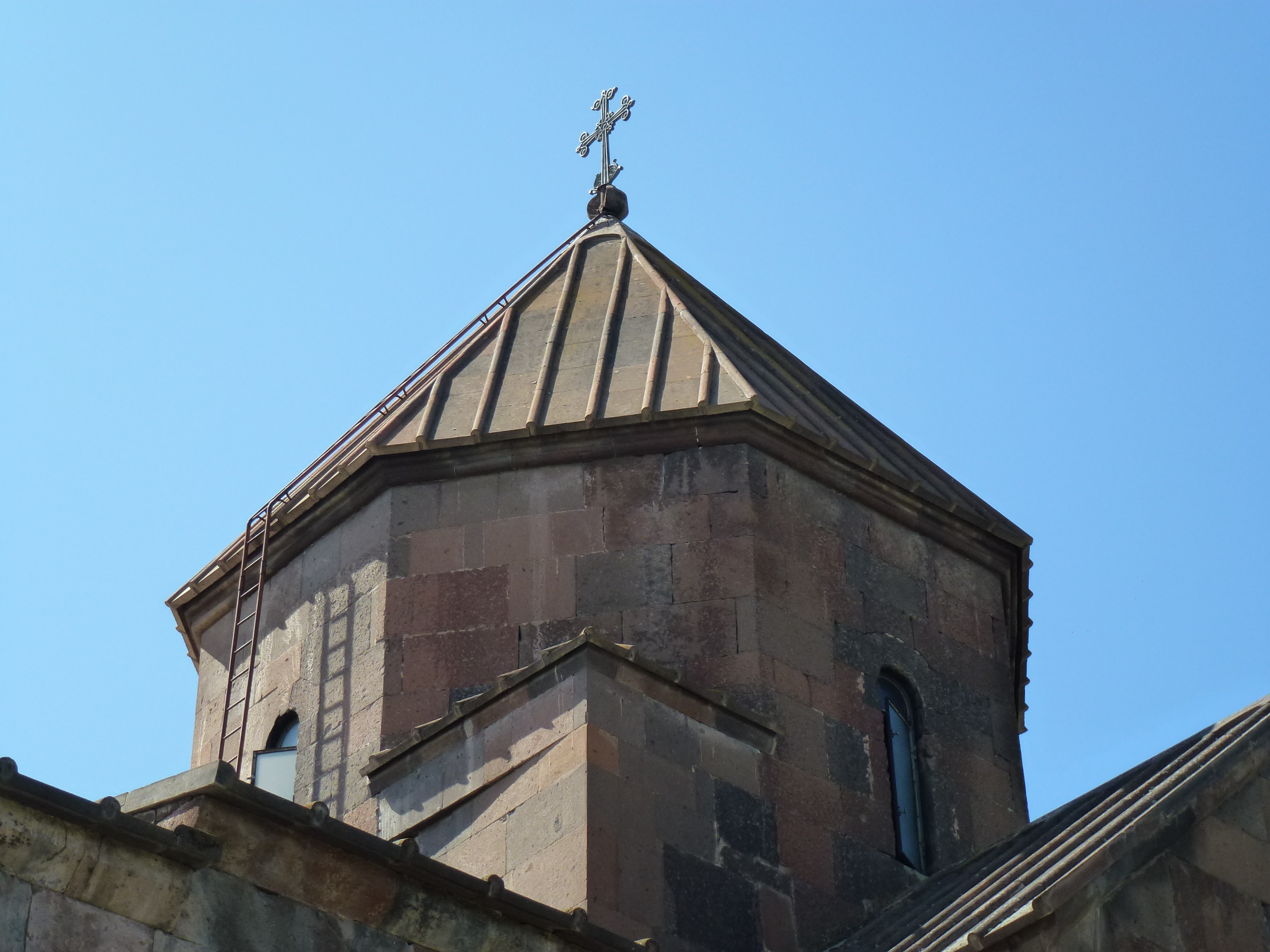

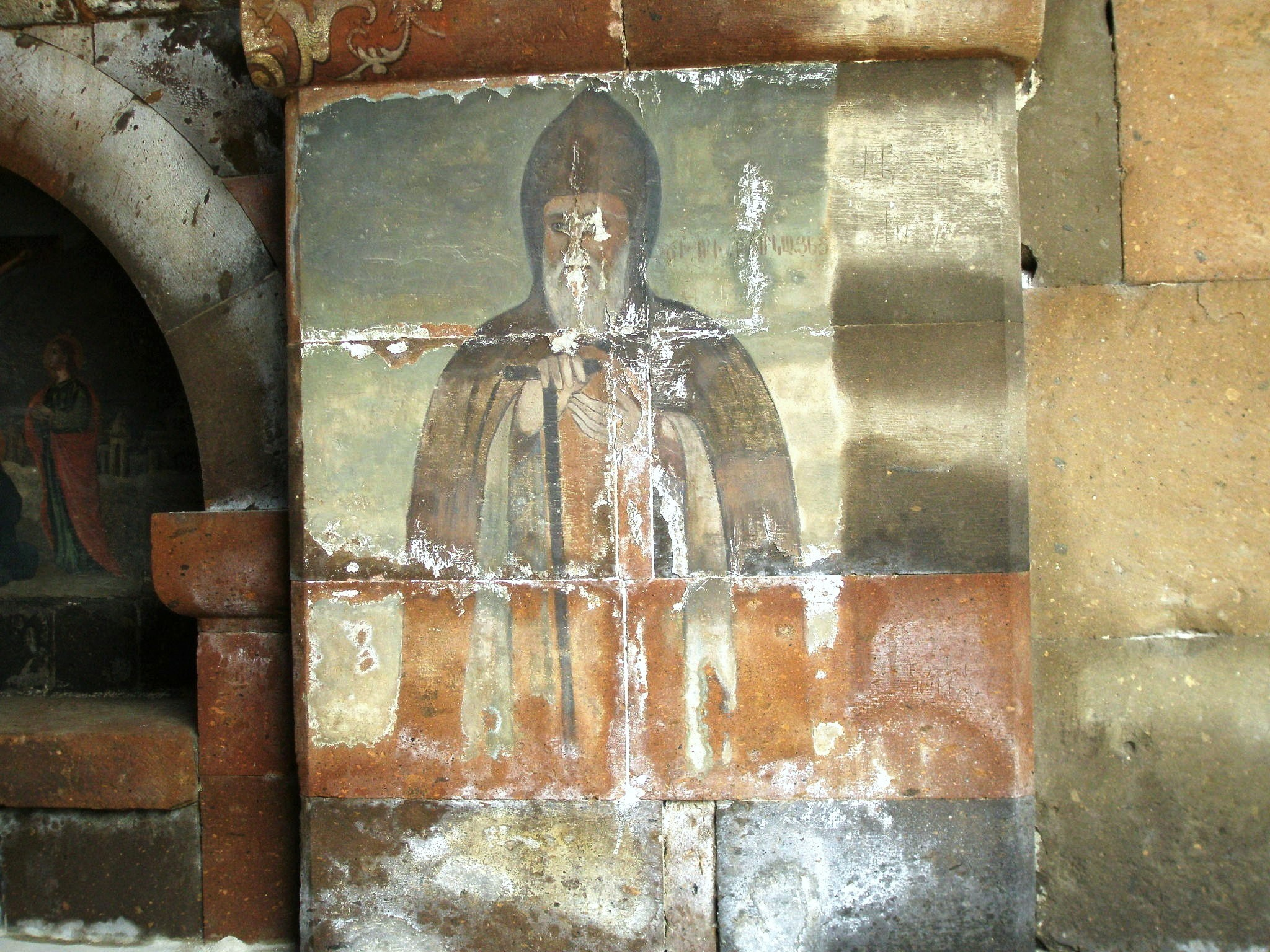
Frescos of clergymen under the portico at the front of the church.

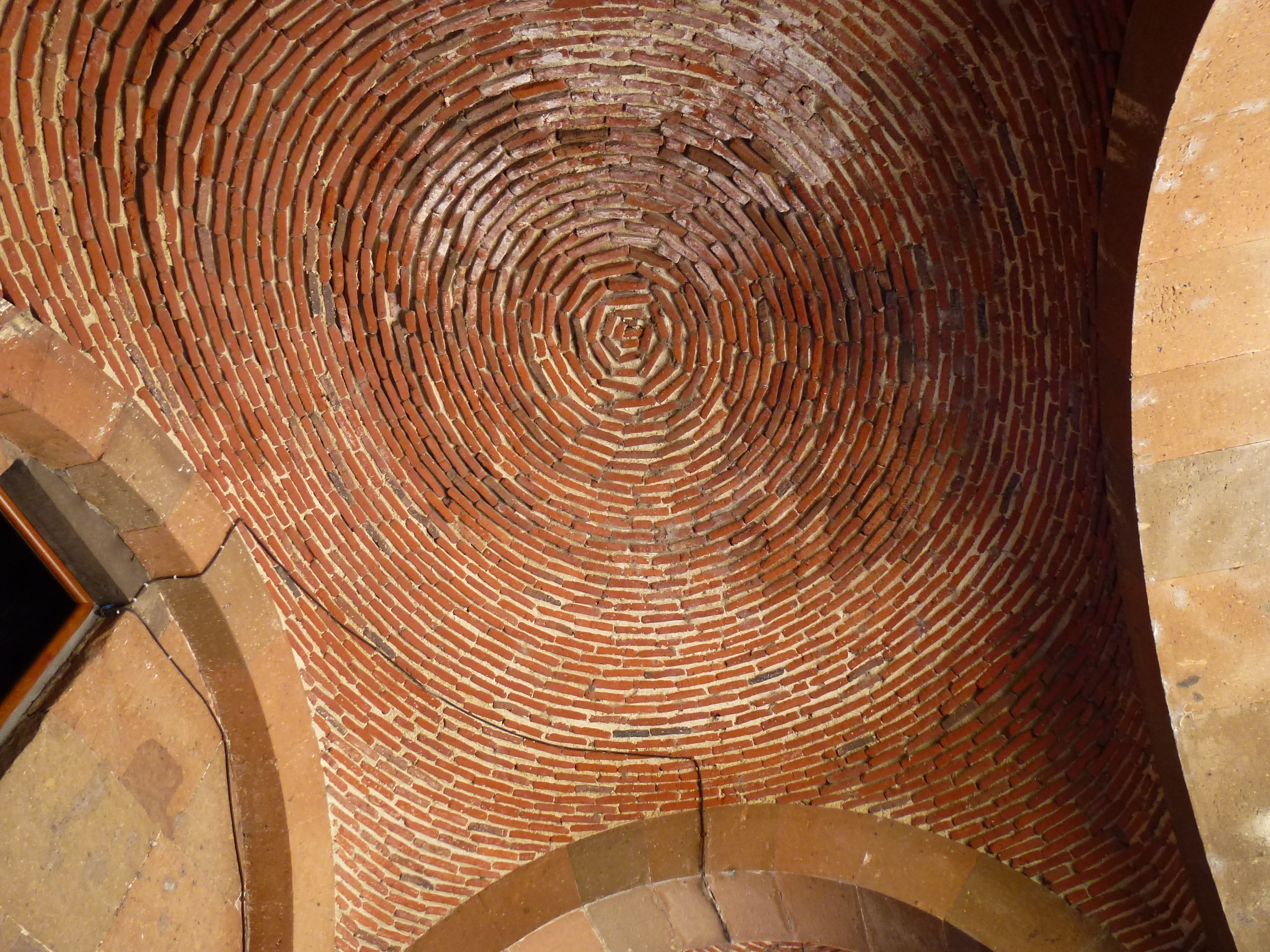

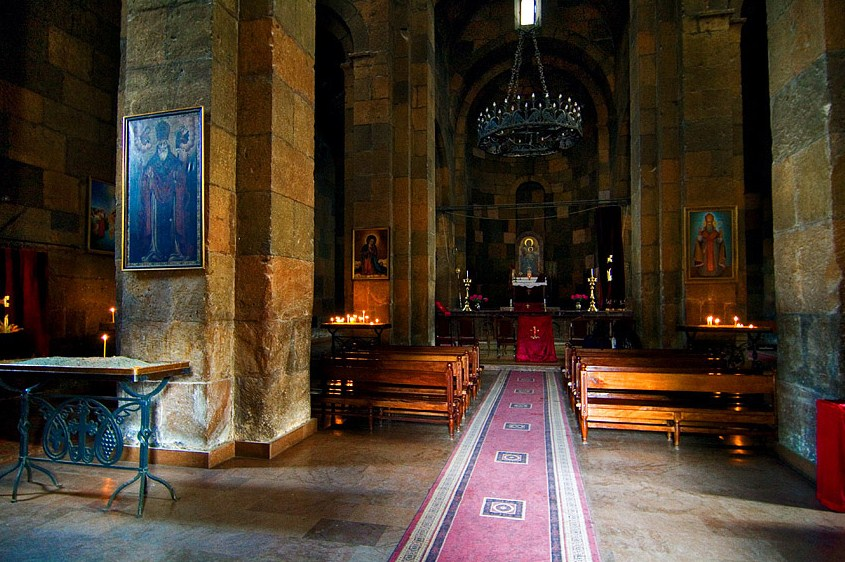
Main hall interior.

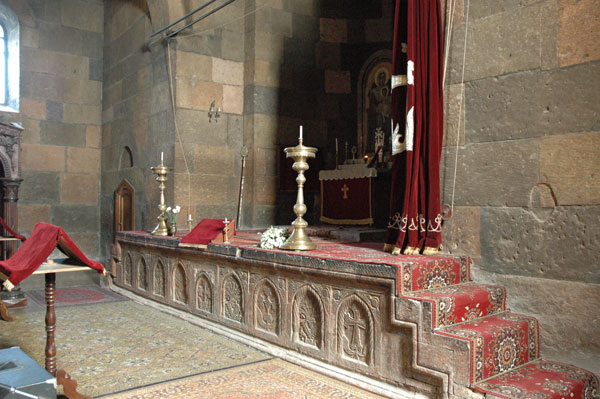
The apse at the eastern end of S. Gayane.

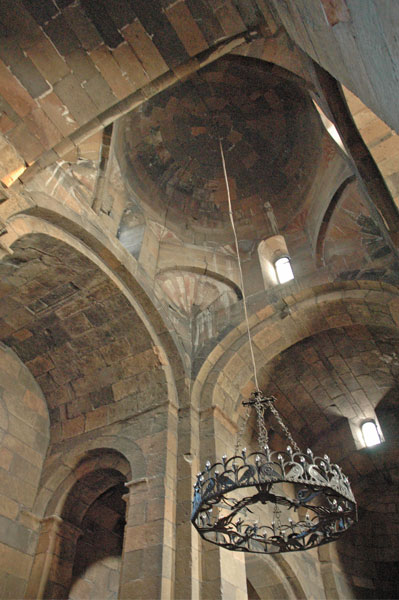
The interior of the drum and dome.

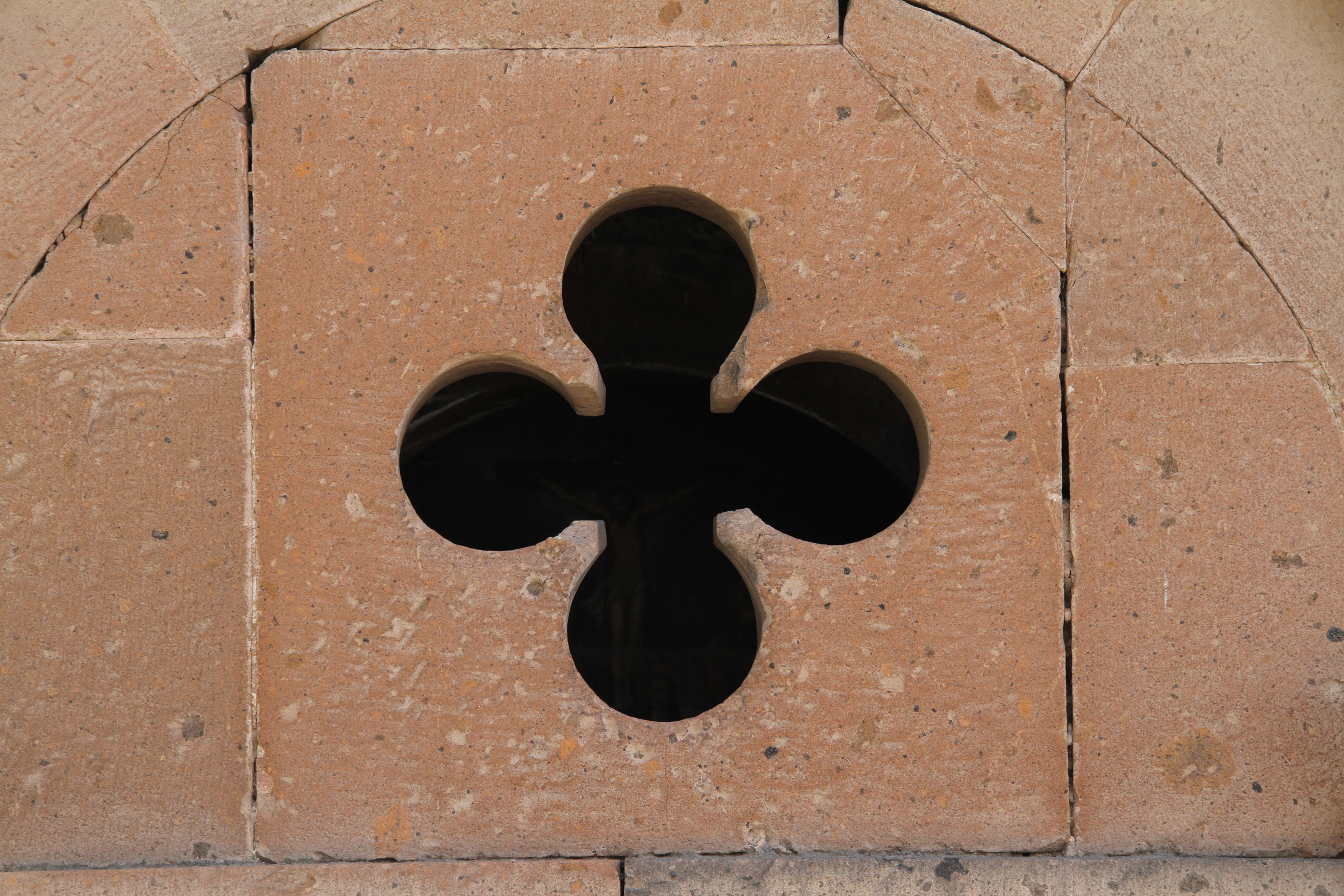
S. Gayane fragment of the building

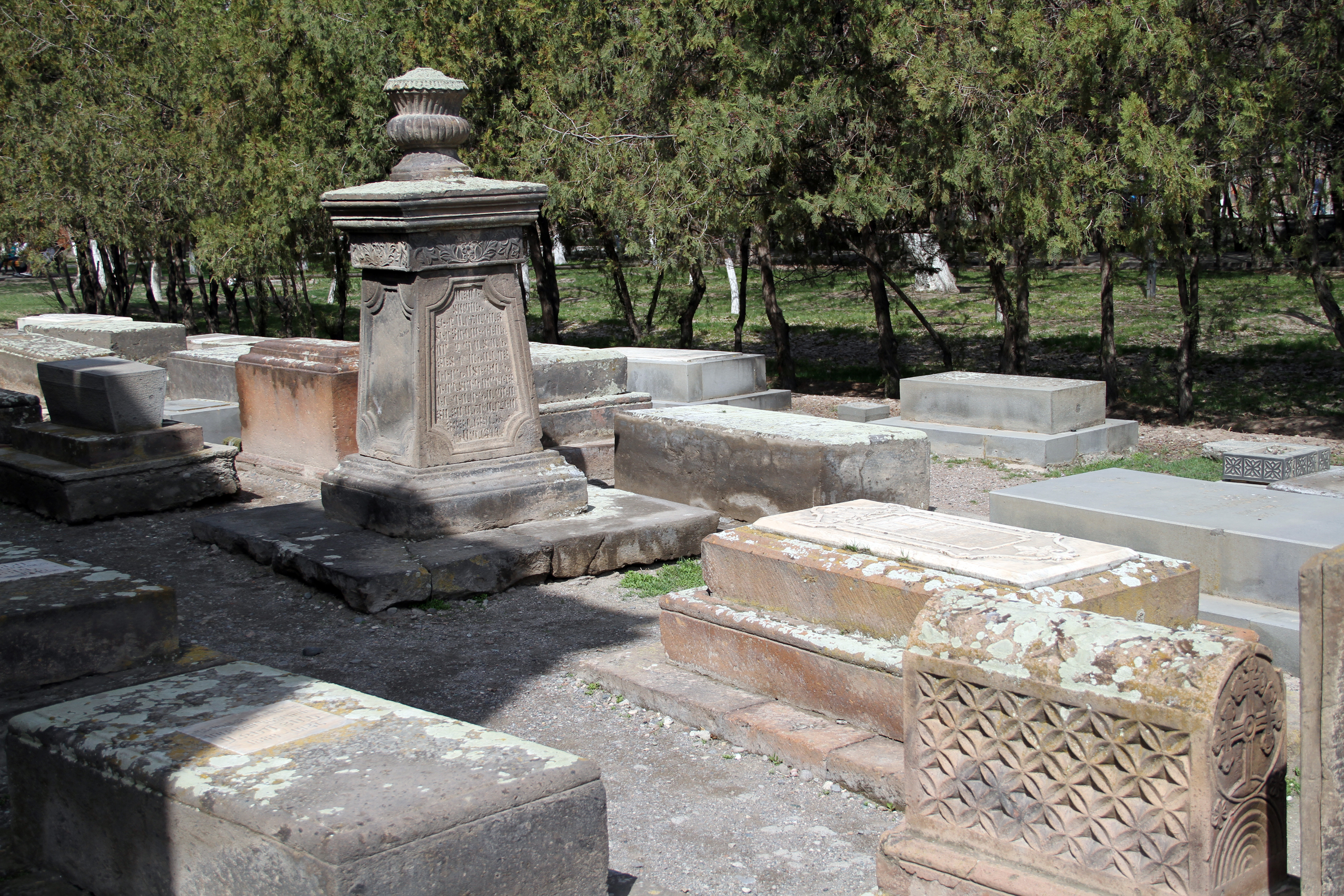
S. Gayane outdoors

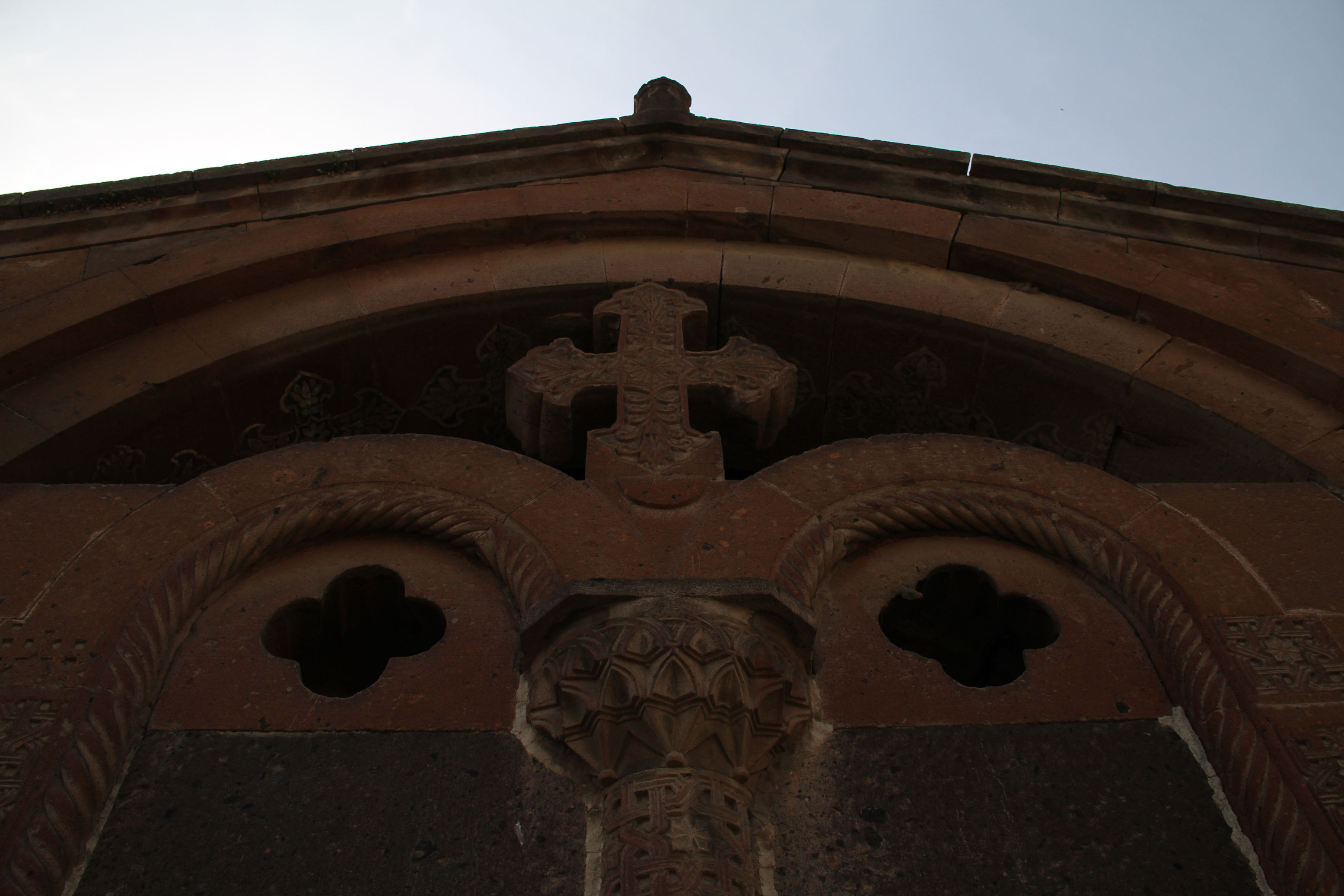
Roof

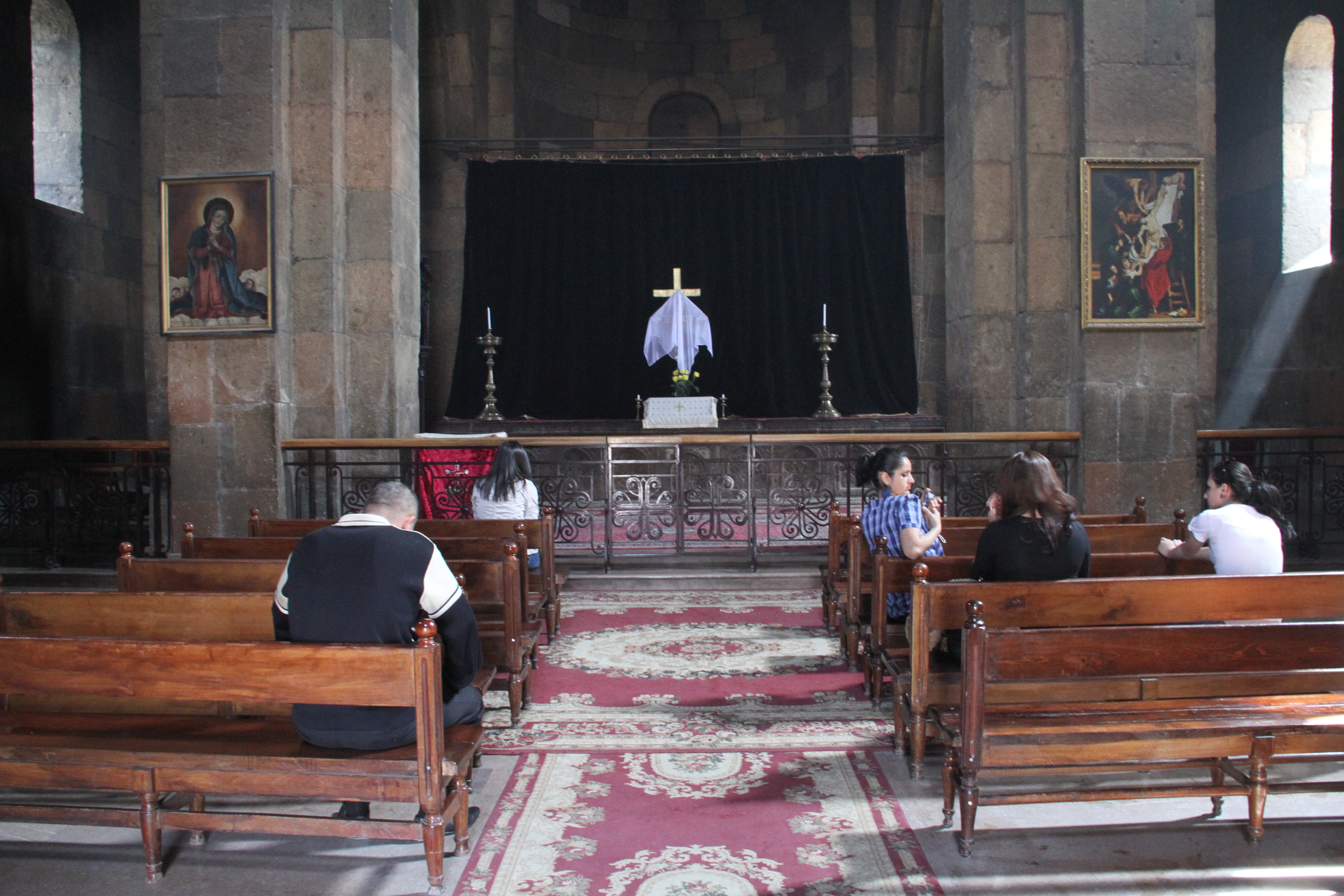
Saint Gayane Church inside

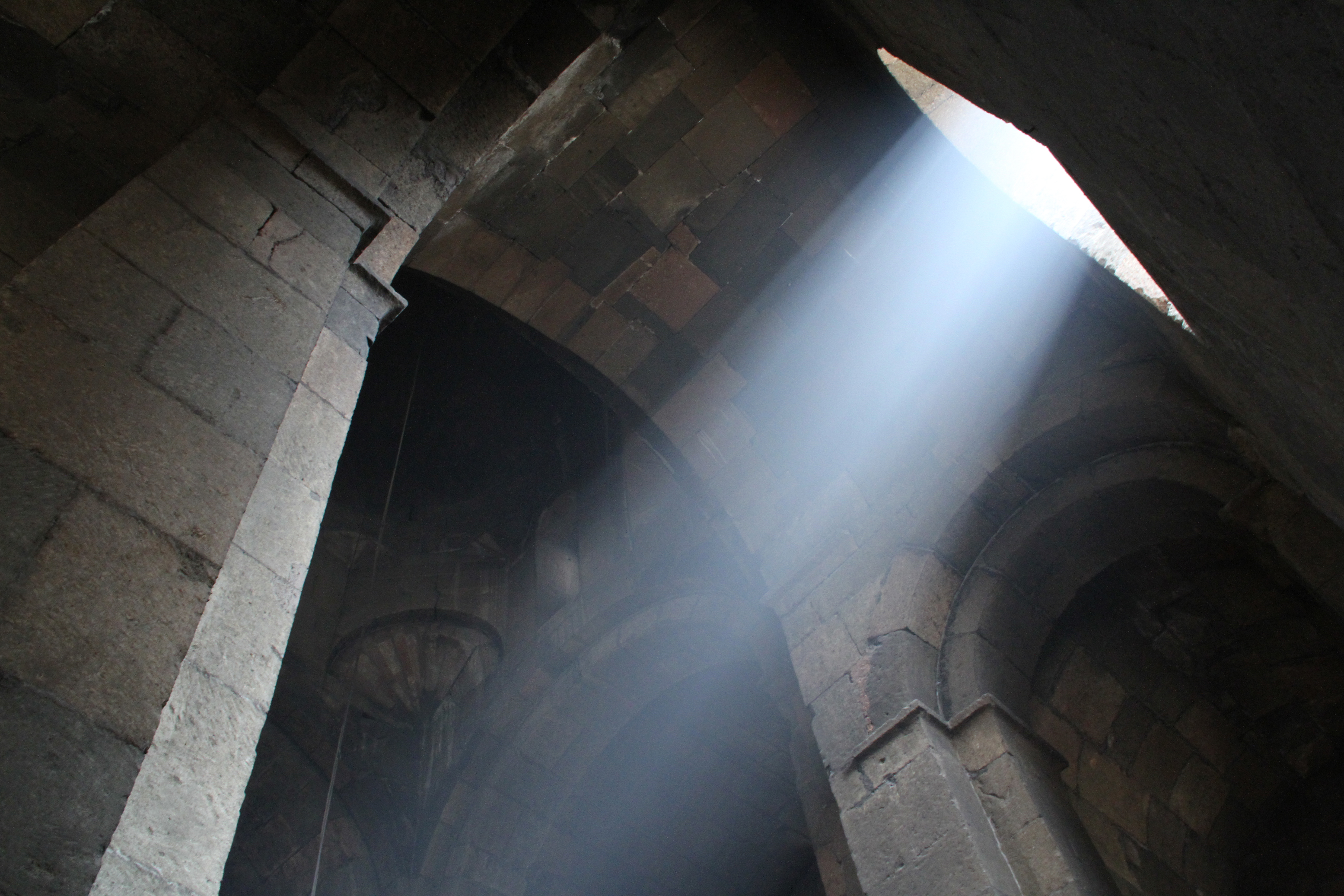

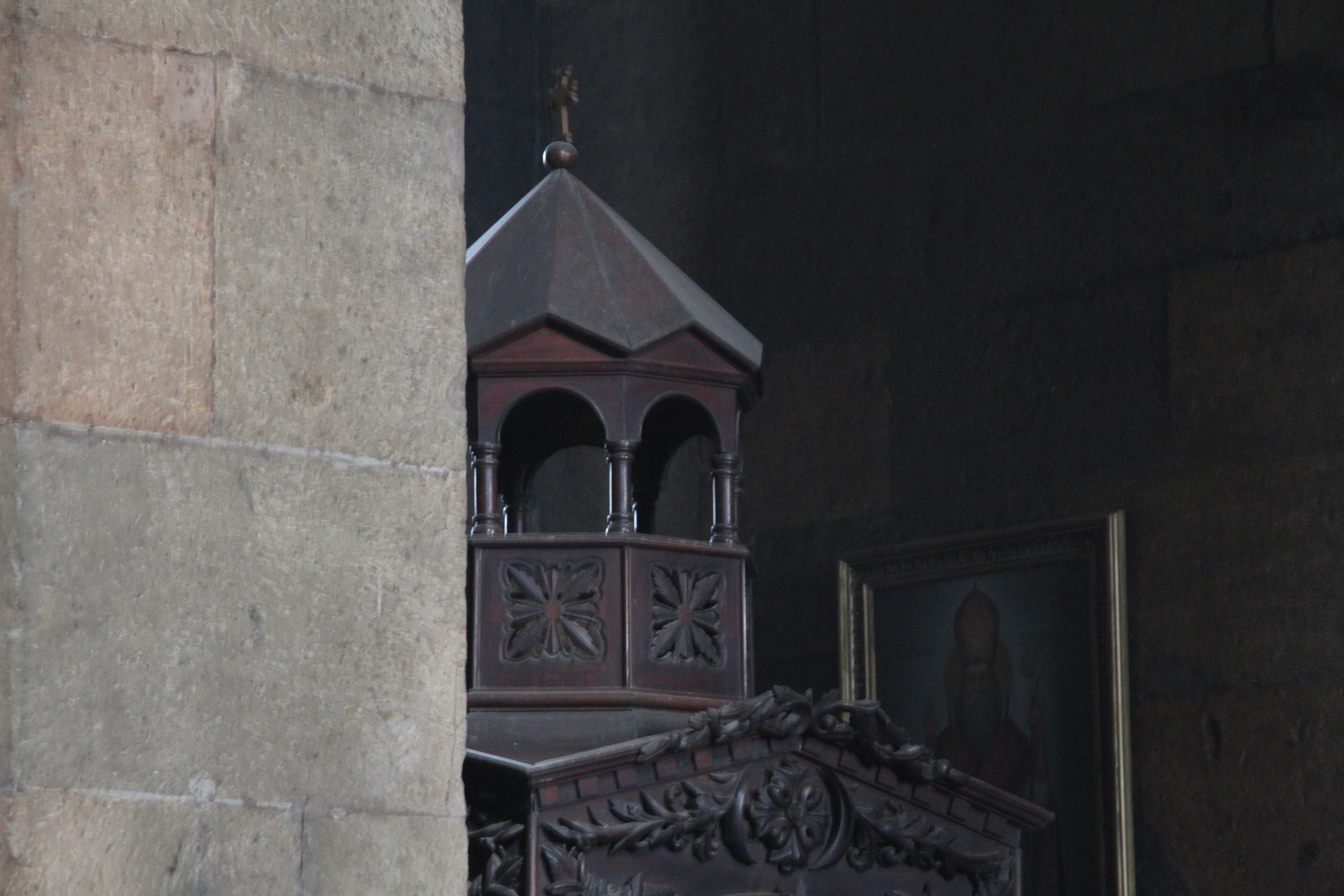

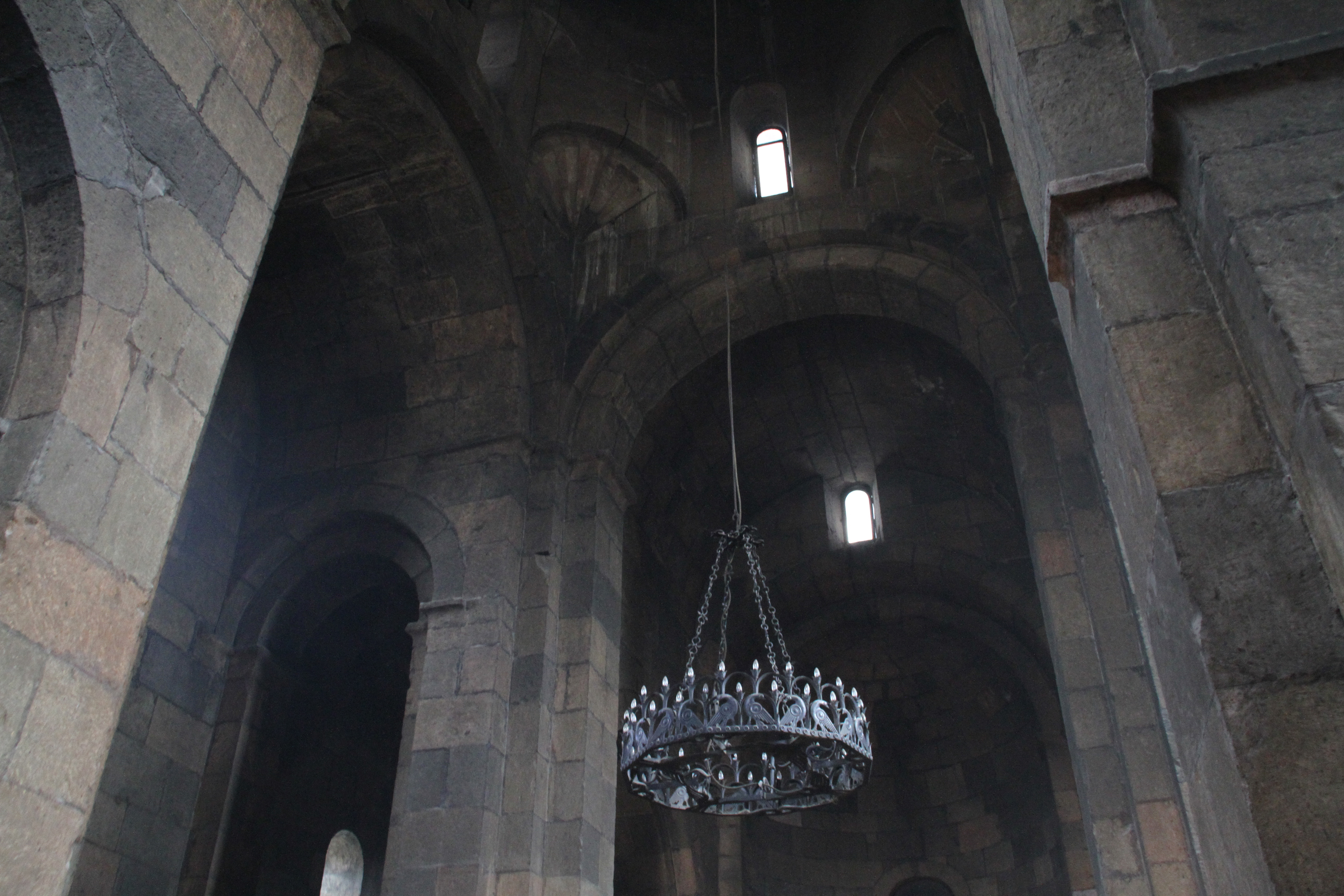

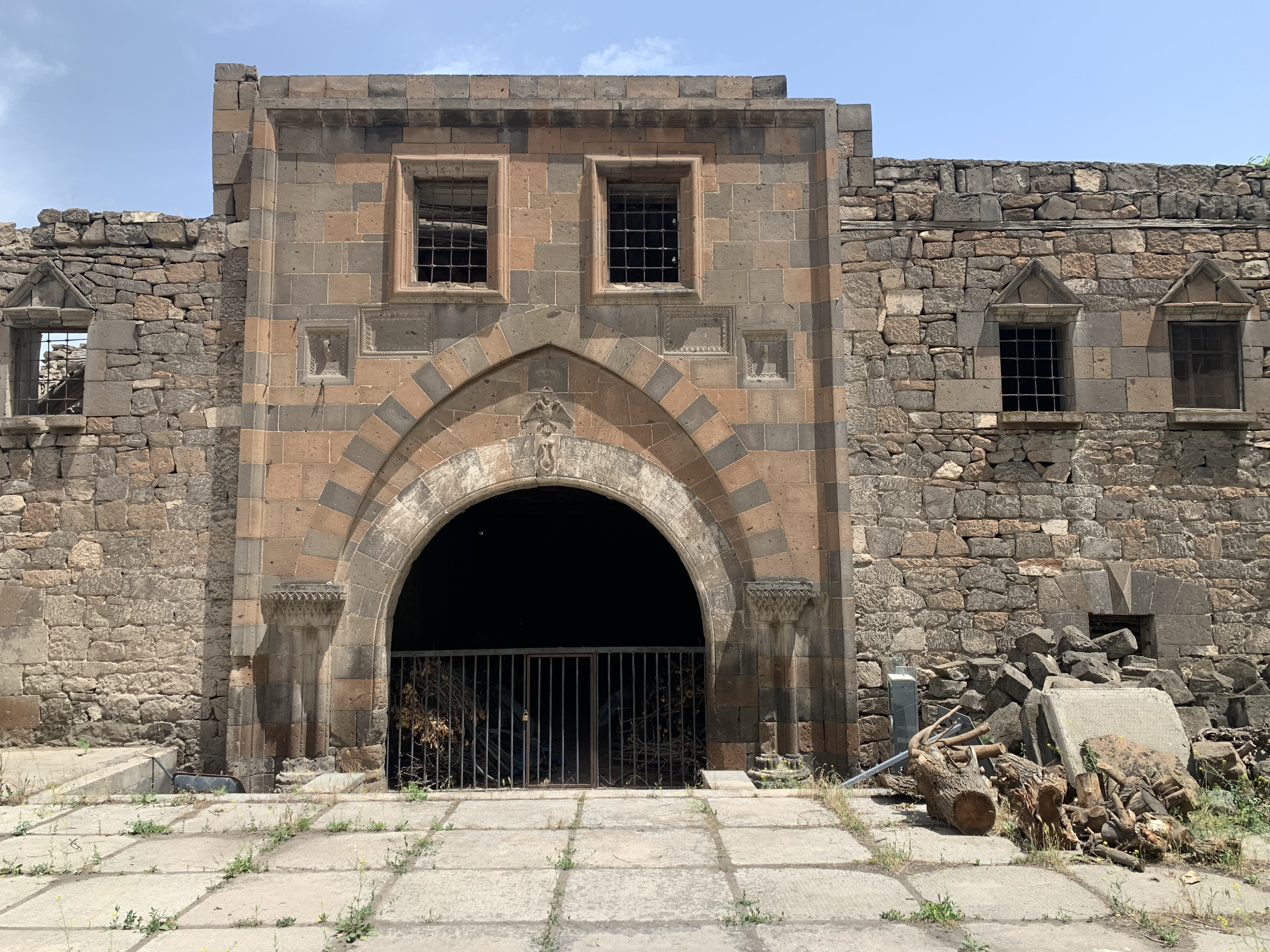
Building near church

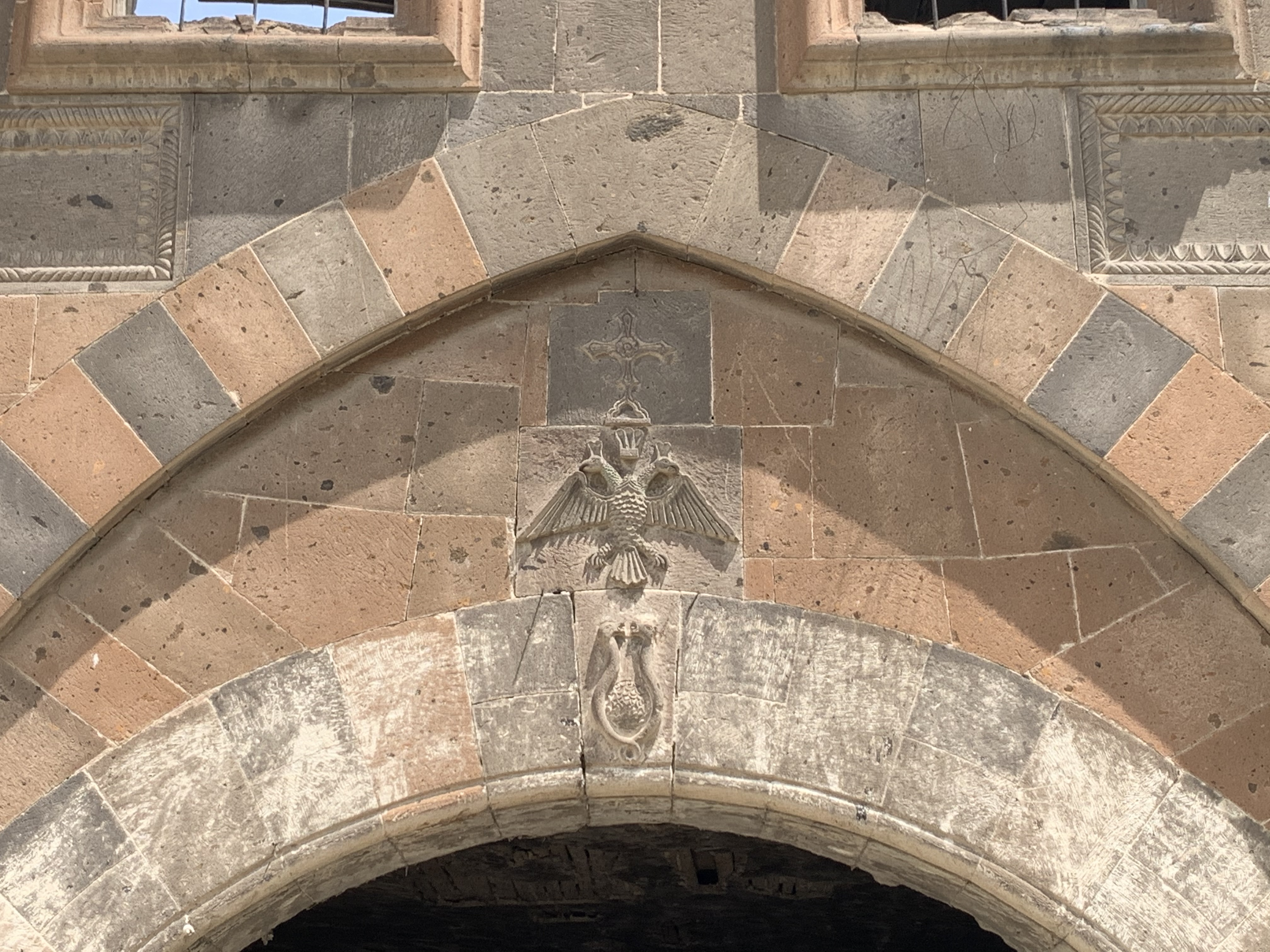

== See also ==
- Vagharshapat
- Etchmiadzin Cathedral
- Saint Hripsimé Church
- Zvartnots Cathedral

== Bibliography ==
- Kiesling, Brady (June 2000). Rediscovering Armenia: An Archaeological/Touristic Gazetteer and Map Set for the Historical Monuments of Armenia (PDF). Yerevan: Mattit. p. 34. ISBN 9994101218. Archived from the original (PDF) on 6 November 2021.
- Kiesling, Brady (2005), Rediscovering Armenia: Guide, Yerevan, Armenia: Matit Graphic Design Studio
