= Makhluto =

Armenian revolutionary

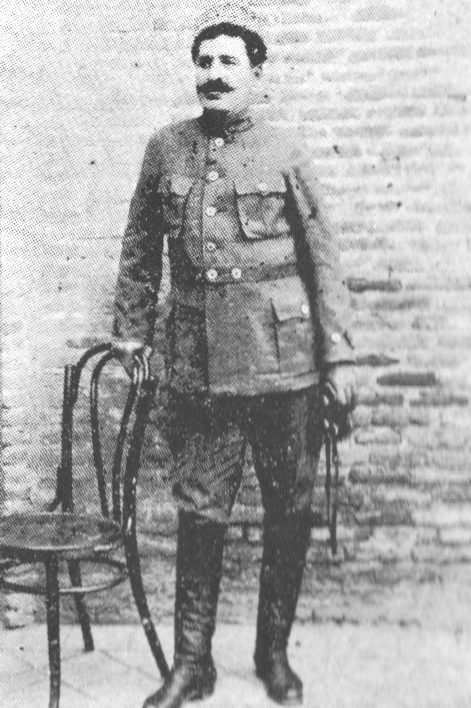
- Makhluto, 1905
- Born: Smbat Boroyan (Սմբատ Բորոյան); 15 August 1875; Mush, Western Armenia
- Died: 20 Mart 1956 (80 age); Yerevan, Armenian SSR, Soviet Union
- Burial place: Saint Gayane Church
- Military career
- Allegiance: Dashnaktsutyun (1880s–1921); Republic of Armenia (1918–1920)
- Service years: 1880s–1921
- Rank: General
- Conflicts: Armenian National Liberation Movement; Sasun Uprising; Iranian Constitutional Revolution; World War I; Caucasus Campaign; Battle of Van; Battle of Bitlis; Battle of Dilman; Armenian–Azerbaijani War; February Uprising

Makhluto (Armenian: Մախլուտո; 1875–1956), born Smbat Boroyan (Armenian: Սմբատ Բորոյան), also known as General Smbat, was an Armenian fedayee commander during the Armenian national movement. He was known for his battles alongside General Andranik Ozanian.

== Early Age ==
Smbat was born in Western Armenian city of Mush in 1875. When he was a child, his parents sent him to Saint Karapet Monastery to receive a formal education. During this time, Smbat became acquainted with the "Armenian Question". He became inspired by the stories he heard of Armenian guerrillas (feedayis) taking arms to defend their homeland. In the mid-1880s, Smbat and his friend Levon escaped from school to join the feedayis. He joined the Vardanantz group when aged 15. One of his first tasks was to move their bags and rifles because they did not initially trust him with a gun.

== Early Revolutionary Activities ==
Makhluto was present throughout most of the major battles that took place in the Van-Taron region in the 1890s. He fought along with other feedayis such as Kevork Chavoush, Andranik Pasha, Keri, and Murad of Sebastia. During the Hamidian massacres of the Armenians in 1894-1896, Makhluto joined Andranik Pasha in mounting armed attacks against the Ottoman army and Ottoman Kurdish raiders to defend Armenian citizens under persecution. Makhluto also took up arms during the Sasun Uprising. After the Sassoun resistance, Andranik, Kevork Chavush, Sebastatsi Murad, and Makhluto, with another 200 fighters, went to Van. The Feedayis took positions on Akhtamar Island. The Turks discovered their whereabouts and sent several ships with heavy weaponry to capture and kill them. They successfully defeated the Turkish attacks. In the aftermath, the feedayis decided to split. One group went to Sassoun with Kevork Chavush, and the other group to the Caucasus via the Persian border with Andranik Pasha. In 1907, Makhluto was present during the Battle of Sulukh in which Kevork Chavoush was killed. In 1908, he was involved in the Iranian Constitutional Revolution with Yeprem Khan. In 1914, during the outskirts of World War I, Makhluto became General Andranik's fedayee commander in the Caucasus Campaign.

== The Armenian genocide ==
During the Armenian genocide, Makhluto was one of General Andranik's deputy commanders. From 1915-1916, Makhluto and Andranik were involved in the offensive battles in capturing Van. By 1916, Makhluto and Andranik had extended the Armenian frontier and participated in the Battle of Bitlis against Mustafa Kemal and in the Battle of Dilman. Makhluto was wounded and transferred to Tiflis. His wife was killed by the Turks. In 1917, the Bolshevik revolution had resulted in the withdrawal of Russian soldiers from the Armenian fronts. The Armenians began to form their own militias to guard the abandoned frontier. The situation deteriorated with the counter-offensive of Turkish troops within the Armenian highland. Andranik and Makhluto were forced to withdraw to Mush-Sassoun plains, where they took up defensive positions. By mid-1917, Makhluto was the commander of Khanous-Manaskert region. By late 1917 and early 1918, the renewed Turkish offensive had pushed the Armenian soldiers back to the frontier. Andranik and Makhluto shifted military strategies and moved most of their soldiers to defend and hold the Erzurum line of position.

== The First Republic of Armenia ==
The result of the Turkish invasion of Armenia in 1918 forced Makhluto and his soldiers to withdraw to Sardarapat. Along with General Andranik, Makhluto was assigned to mobilize the defense of the Armenian border. During this period, their militia was in constant disagreement with the newly declared Armenian government, which was trying to sign a peace treaty with the Turks (Treaty of Batum). Makhluto and Andranik disagreed with the treaty because it would nullify Armenian claims to Western Armenia. During the Second Congress of Western Armenians (1919), Makhluto was elected as a member of the Executive Body, to function until the creation of a combined government of united Armenia. After the Armenian government signed the Treaty of Batum, Makhluto and Andranik went to Zangezour to fight against Azeri militias that were rebelling against the newly created government. In 1920, Turkish revolutionaries led by Kazim Karabekir initiated the second invasion of Armenia. Makhluto received a military rank of general and was heavily wounded on 22 September 1920. The successful invasion and occupation of most Armenia resulted in the resignation of the government and the acceptance of the Sovietization of Armenia. The newly appointed Communist government began a severe crackdown on former Dashnak nationalists, politicians, and military personnel. Many were arrested and executed. On 13 February 1921, Makhluto (still wounded) went to Aragats-Talin region, and succeeded in assisting a revolt against the Communist regime in Armenia. On 17 February, Makhluto and his army occupied Yerevan, succeeding in a coup and establishing Simon Vratsian as Prime Minister. They managed to free many persecuted victims of the communist regime. The aftermath revealed that in Yerevan prison about 75 Armenian political and military prisoners were killed by Bolsheviks with axes and machetes. Amongst the dead were famous Armenian voluntary commander Hamazasp and Gabriel Korganyan. The successful Soviet occupation of neighboring Georgia resulted in a fear of a complete Soviet army take over and occupation of Armenia. The provisional government and the Bolsheviks came to an agreement, that there will no longer be any political persecutions if they were to discontinue coup activities and allow for the Sovietization of the newly formed Armenian nation. The provisional government disbanded with many of the coup members fleeing to other countries. Thus, on 2 April 1921, the Communists retook Yerevan.

== Later life ==
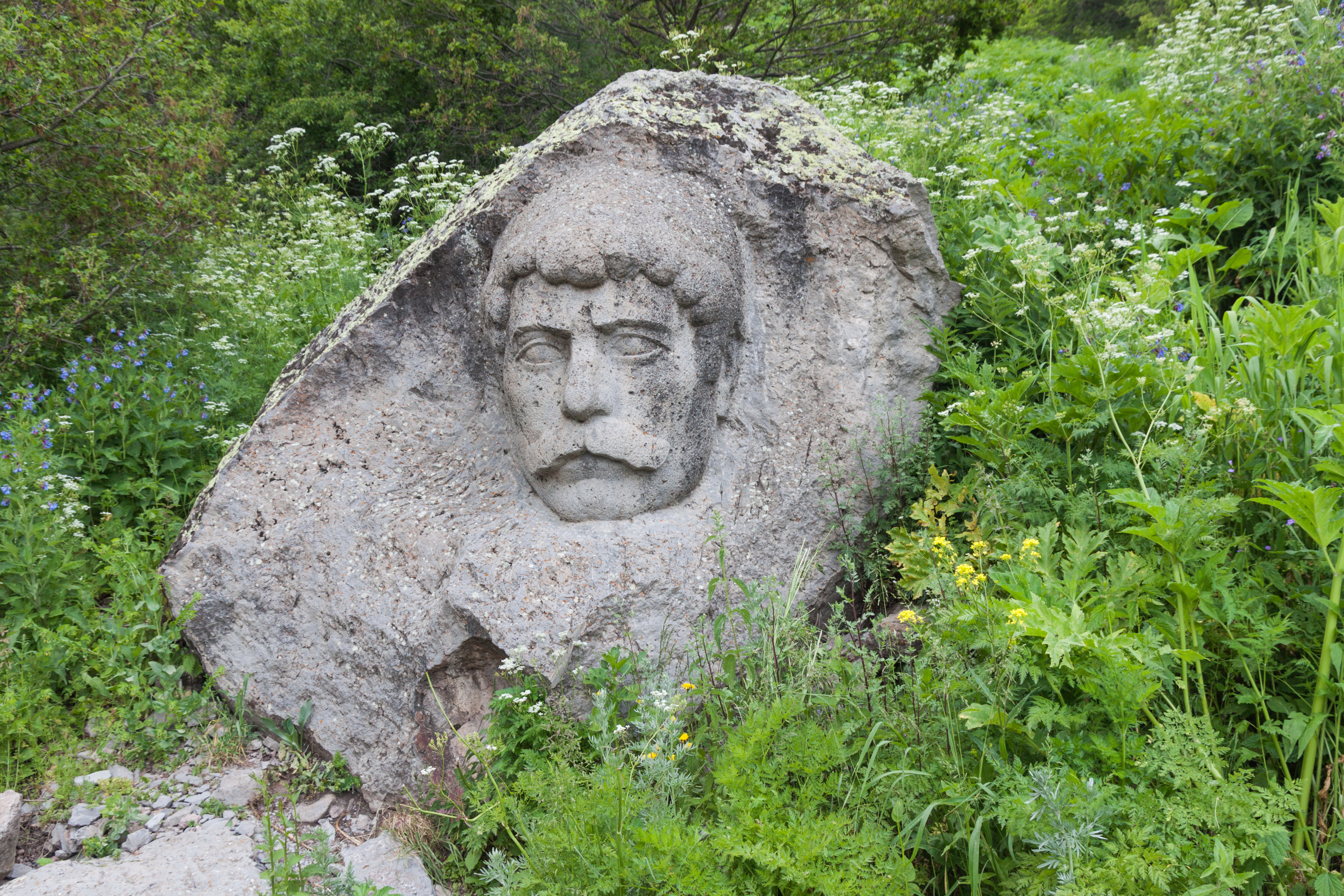
Makhluto's bust in Jermuk, Armenia

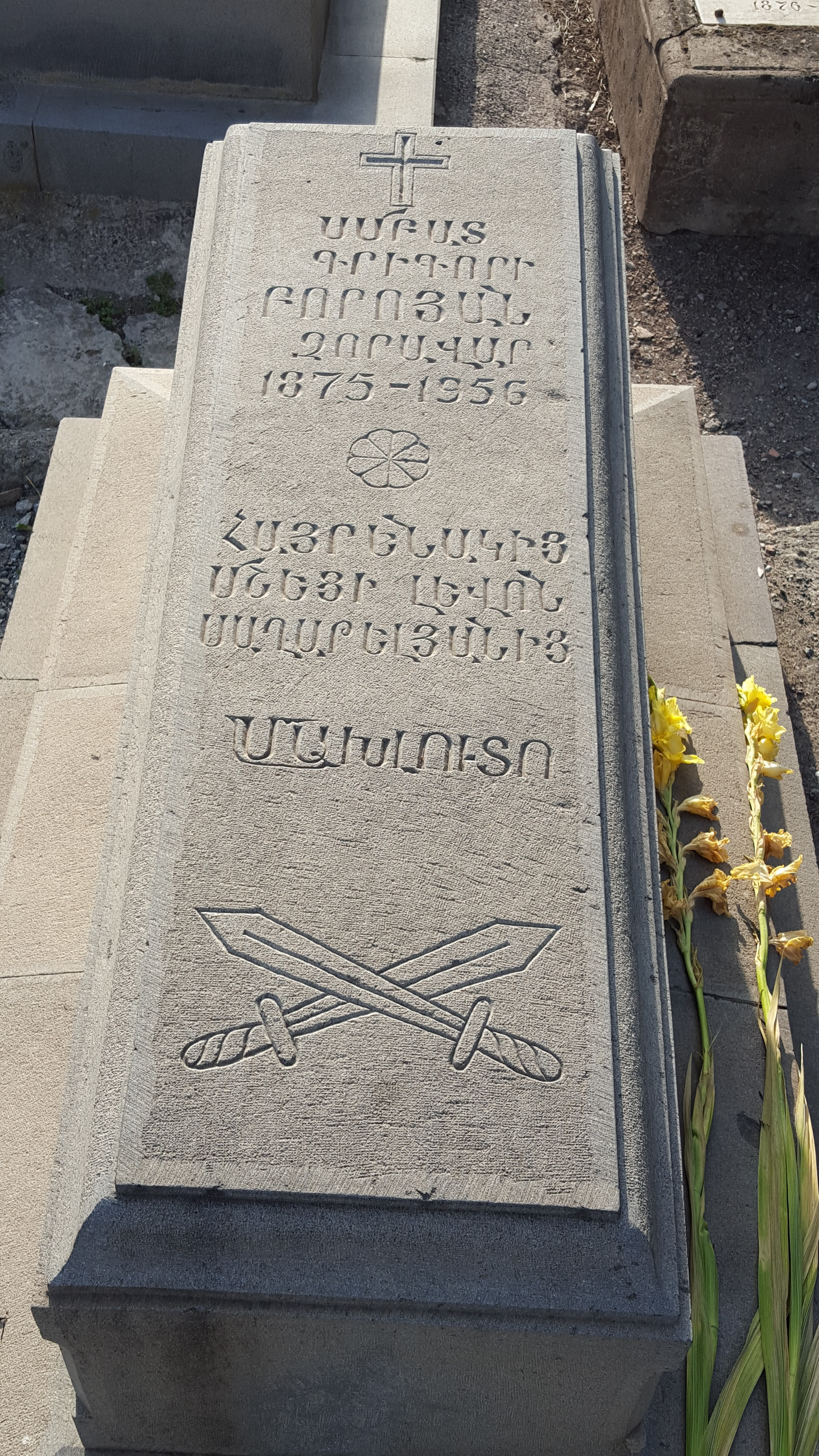
Makhluto's tombstone at Saint Gayane Church.

Once the communists retook control of Yerevan, Makhluto fled to Syunik, eventually crossing the border into Persia. From Persia he emigrated to the United States, where he took up residence in Fresno, California. Once in the United States he met his former comrades, including General Andranik. In 1946, Makhluto emigrated to Soviet Armenia via France, where he had been temporarily living. The remaining 10 years of his life were spent peacefully in Yerevan where he worked as a housekeeper at the Komitas park. During this time he met with some of his volunteer army friends and with those who had been living abroad. Makhluto died in 1956 in his home from natural causes. Makhluto was buried near Saint Gayane Church in Vagharshapat (Etchmiadzin).

His memories became the main idea of Khachik Dashtents' novel "Ranchparneri Kanche" (The Call of Plowmen).
