= Gayne =

Gayne is a surname and given name. Notable people with the name include:

- Chris Gayne (fl. from 2009), Scottish sound designer
- Gayne Dexter (1895–1966), Australian journalist, publicist and screenwriter
- Gayne Rescher, (1924–2008), American cinematographer
- Gayne Whitman (1890–1958), American radio and film actor

== See also ==
- Gaine, surname
- Gayane (disambiguation)
- Gaynes (disambiguation)
