= Kessel, Limburg =

Kessel
- Small city and former municipality
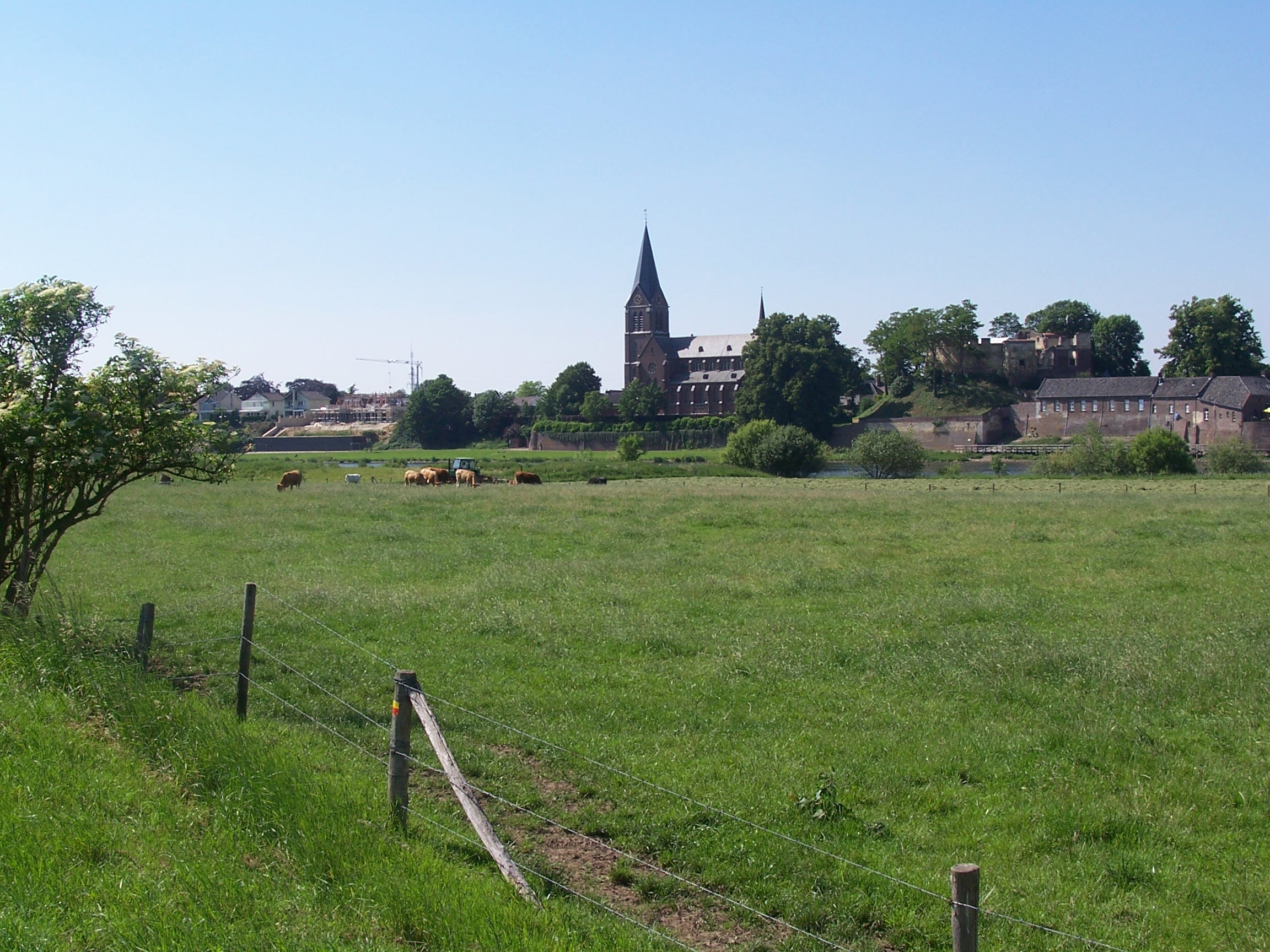

- Flag Coat of arms

- Location in the Netherlands Location in the province of Limburg in the Netherlands
- Coordinates: 51°17′N 6°03′E
- Country: Netherlands
- Province: Limburg
- Municipality: Peel en Maas

Area
  - Total: 10.44 km^{2} (4.03 sq mi)
- Elevation: 21 m (69 ft)

Population (2021)
  - Total: 3,190
  - Density: 306/km^{2} (791/sq mi)
- Time zone: UTC+1 (CET)
  - Summer (DST): UTC+2 (CEST)
- Postal code: 5995
- Dialing code: 077
- Website: www.kessellimburg.nl/

Kessel (Dutch pronunciation: [ˈkɛsəl]) is a former municipality and a city in the southeastern province of Limburg, in the Netherlands. It is a small historic municipality with 4,246 residents. It merged with neighbouring municipalities in the new municipality of Peel en Maas (as of 1 January 2010). To the west are the Heldense Bossen (Helden Forest) and to the east is the Meuse river.

It has a small historic city center with a castle and a historic marketplace. To the south is the Kessel-Eik neighbourhood with the Eikelenpeel and Musschenberg.

== History ==
The d'Ewes baronets of Stowlangtoft, England are descended from Gerard D'Ewes, Lord of Kessel, at that time part of Duchy of Gelderland.

== Gallery ==
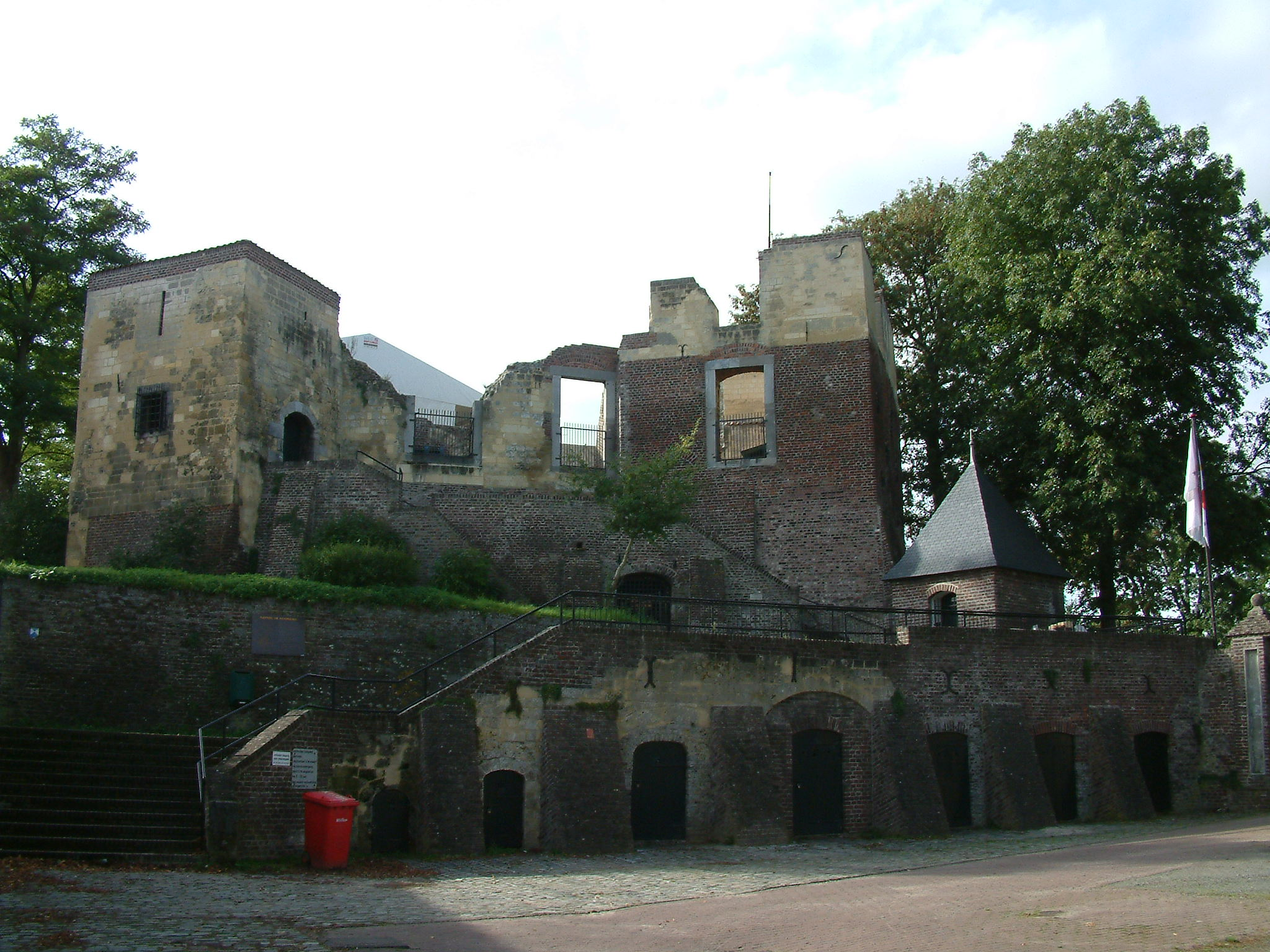
Ruins of Keverberg Castle

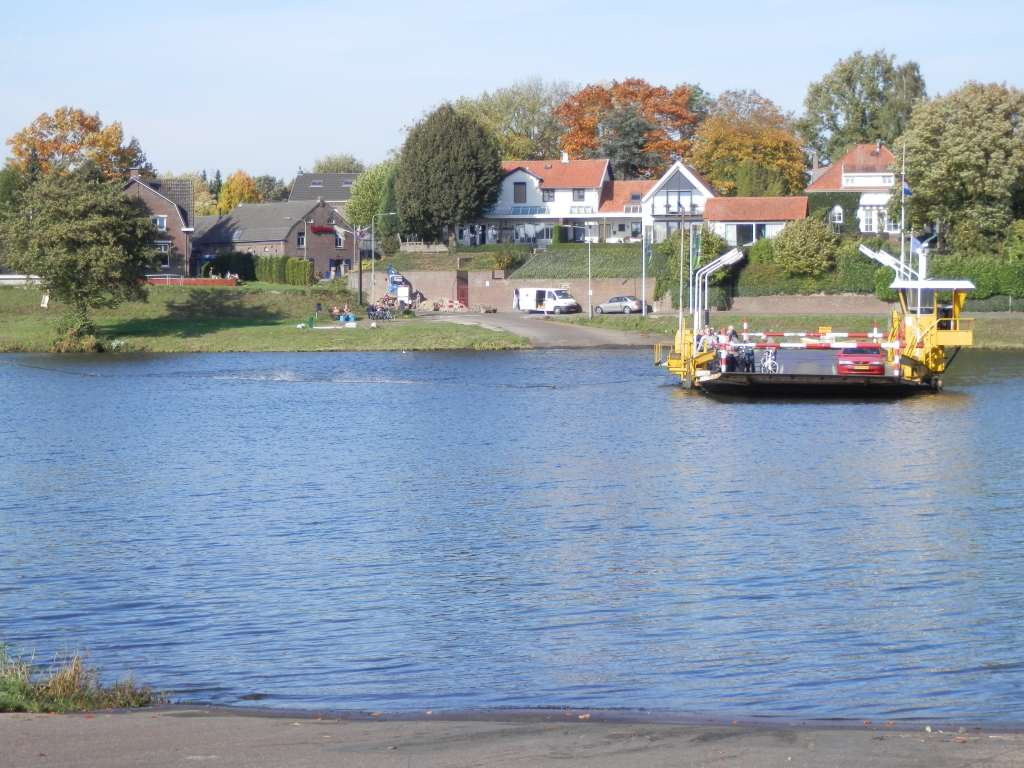
Ferry across the Maas

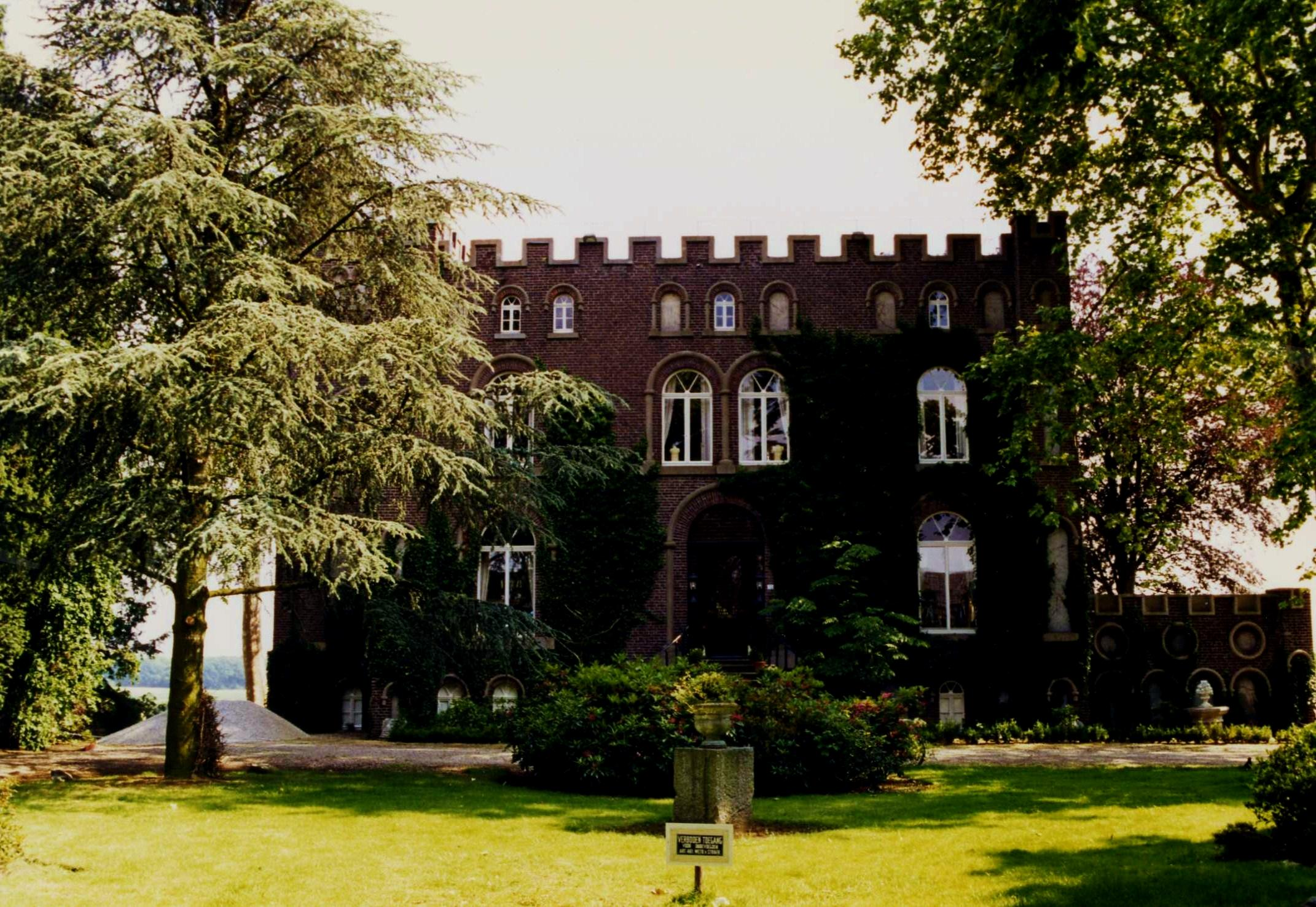
Estate Oeverberg

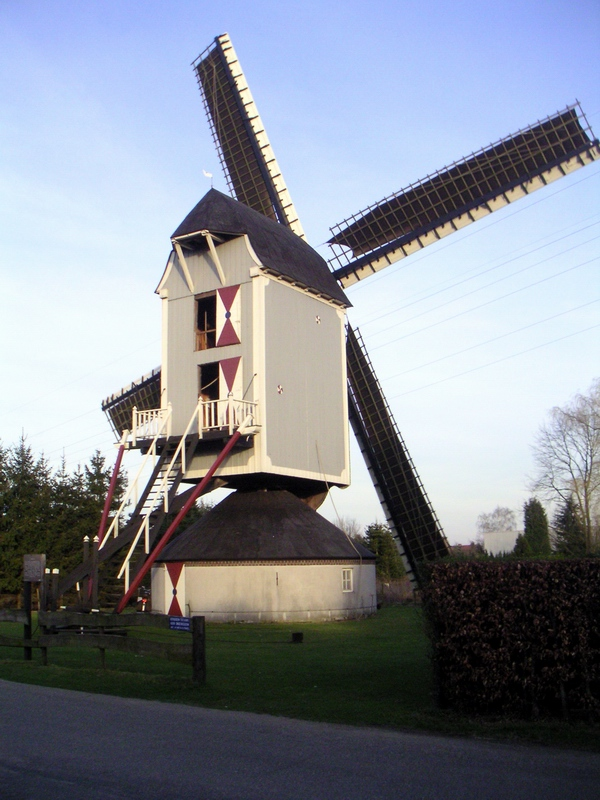
Windmill St Anthoniusmolen
