= Gaynes =

Gaynes may refer to:

== Surname ==
- David Gaynes, American documentary filmmaker
- George Gaynes (1917–2016), American actor

== Other ==
- Gaynes Hall, in Cambridgeshire, England
- Gaynes School, school in London
- Gaynes, estate in Upminster

== See also ==
- Gaines (disambiguation)
- Gayne (disambiguation)
