= Gaine =

Gaine is a surname. Notable people with the surname include:

- Brian Gaine, American football executive
- Hugh Gaine (1726–1807), American printer

== See also ==
- Explosive booster, also known as a "gaine"
- Gandarbha, Nepalese tribal community also known as "Gaine"
- Gaines (disambiguation)
- Gayne (disambiguation)
- The Brave Express Might Gaine, 1993 Japanese television series
