= Gaines =

Gaines may refer to:

== Places ==
United States

- Gaines, Michigan, a village
- Gaines Township, Genesee County, Michigan, a civil township in which the above village is located
- Gaines Township, Kent County, Michigan, a charter township
- Gaines, New York, a town
- Gaines Township, Tioga County, Pennsylvania
- Gaines, West Virginia, an unincorporated community

== People ==
- Gaines (surname)
- Gaines A. Knapp (1848–1918), American politician
