= Greg Gaines =

Greg Gaines may refer to:

- Greg Gaines (defensive lineman) (born 1996), defensive lineman for the NFL's Tampa Bay Buccaneers
- Greg Gaines (linebacker) (born 1958), NFL linebacker and coach
