= John Gaines =

John Gaines may refer to:

- John P. Gaines (1795–1857), lawyer, U.S. Representative from Kentucky, Mexican–American War officer, Governor of Oregon Territory
- John W. Gaines (1860–1926), lawyer, U.S. Representative from Tennessee
- John Gaines, character in Babies for Sale

== See also ==
- John Gaines Miller, U.S. representative from Missouri
