= William Gaines (disambiguation) =

William Gaines (1922–1992) was an American publisher, notably of Mad magazine.

William Gaines may also refer to:

== Sportsmen ==
- Bill Gaines (basketball) (born 1946), American guard for San Diego Rockets
- Bill Gaines (sprinter), American 60 yard winner at 1968 USA Indoor Track and Field Championships
- William Gaines (American football) (born 1971), NFL defensive tackle

== Others ==
- William Gaines (minister and community leader) (1824–1865), American freed slave during Reconstruction Era in Georgia
- William E. Gaines (1844–1912), American congressman from Virginia
- William Gaines (professor) (1933–2016), American Pulitzer Prize-winning investigative reporter
