= Gayane (given name) =

- Gender: female

Origin
- Origin: Armenian
- Meaning: unknown
- Region of origin: Armenia

Other names
- Related names: Gayaneh, Gayne

Gayane (Armenian: Գայանե (reformed); Գայիանէ (classical)), also spelled Gayaneh, is a popular Armenian female name of unknown meaning. Some relate it to the Ancient Greek word gaia, who was the "earth goddess," see Gaia.

Gayane was the name of an abbess who was martyred with other nuns by Tiridates III of Armenia in the year 301. She was subsequently made a saint of the Armenian Apostolic Church.

Notable people with the name Gayane:

- Kourtney Kardashian, baptized with the name.
- Gayane Chebotaryan (1918–1998), Armenian composer
- Gayane Khachaturian (1942–2009), Armenian painter
- Gayane Kostanyan (born 1988), Armenian footballer
