= Music of India =

Indian music encompasses numerous genres in multiple varieties and forms which include classical music, folk, rock, and pop. It has a history spanning several millennia and developed over several geo-locations spanning the subcontinent. Music in India began as an integral part of socio-religious life.

== History ==
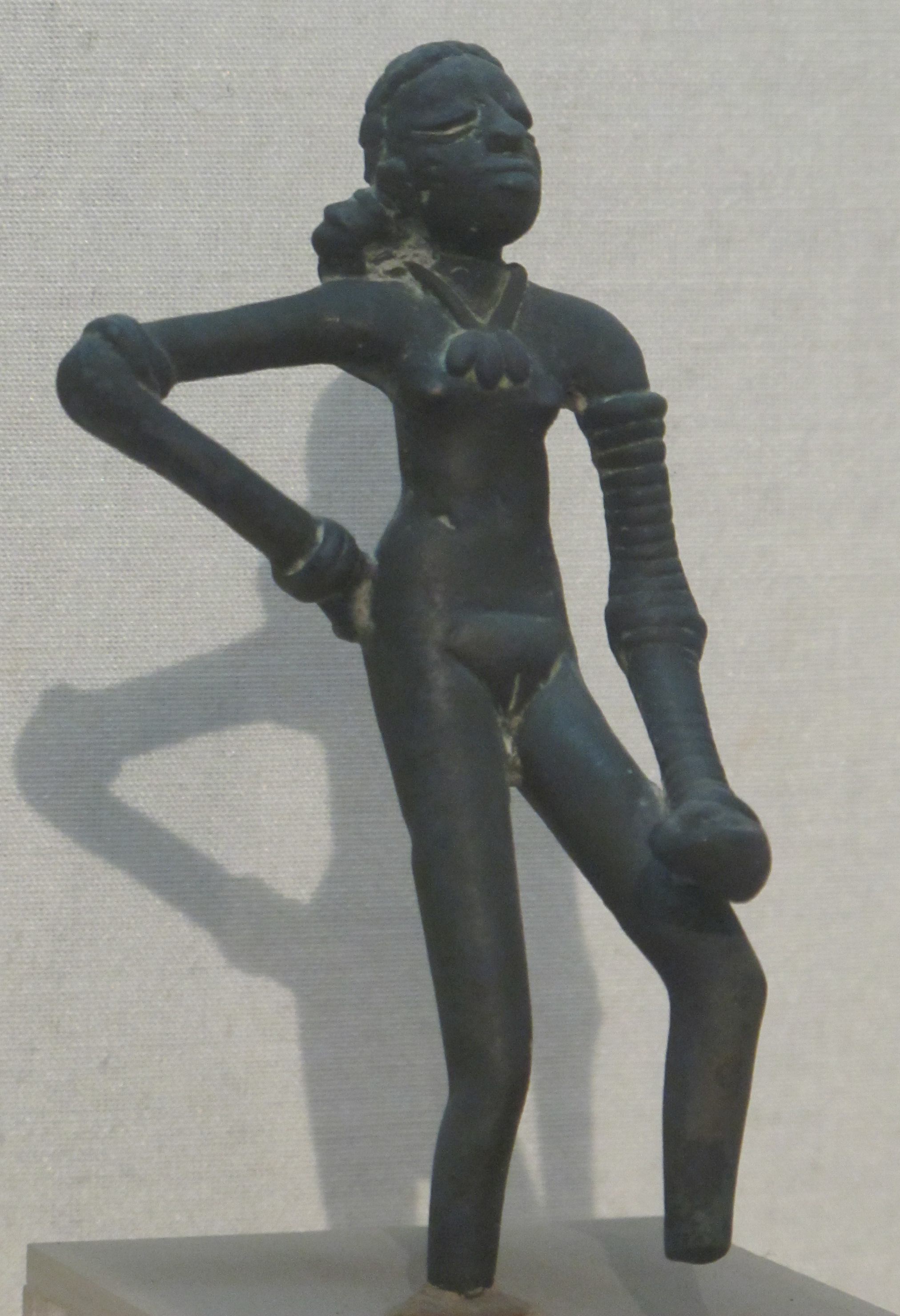
Dancing Girl sculpture from the Indus Valley civilization (c. 4,500 years ago)

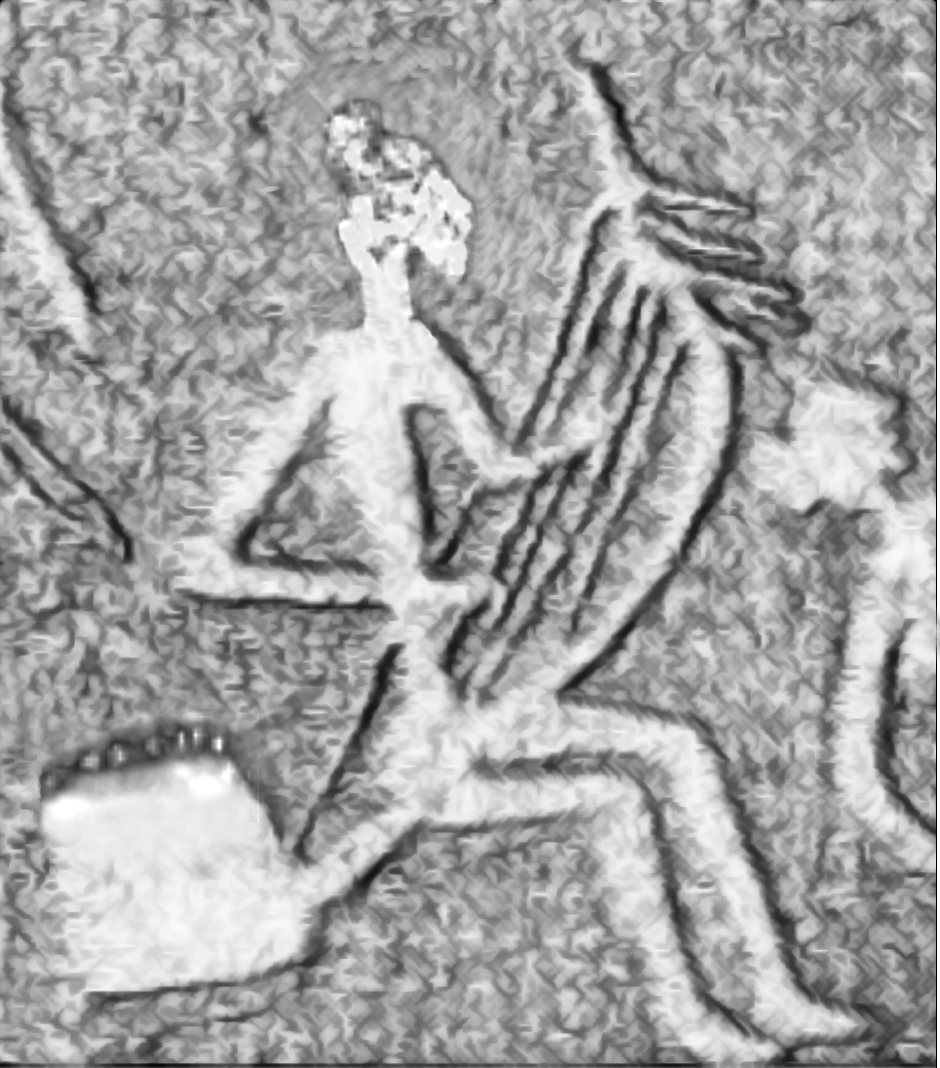
Nimbu Bhoj cave, Pachmarhi, India, date uncertain, possibly 2nd millennium B.C. - 1st millennium B.C. Bronze Age harper playing an arched harp. Digital drawing, recreating cave painting.

=== Pre-history ===
==== Paleolithic ====
The 30,000-year-old Paleolithic and Neolithic cave paintings at the UNESCO World Heritage Site at Bhimbetka rock shelters in Madhya Pradesh show a type of dance. Mesolithic and Chalcolithic cave art of Bhimbetka illustrates musical instruments such as Gongs, Bowed Lyre, and daf.

==== Neolithic ====
Chalcolithic era (4000 BCE onward) narrow bar shaped polished stone celts like music instruments, one of the earlier musical instrument in India, were excavated at Sankarjang in the Angul district of Odisha. There is historical evidence in the form of sculptural evidence, i.e. musical instruments, singing, and dancing postures of damsels in the Ranigumpha Caves in Khandagiri and Udayagiri at Bhubaneswar.

==== Indus Valley Civilisation ====
The Dancing Girl sculpture (2500 BCE) was found from the Indus Valley Civilisation (IVC) site. There are IVC-era paintings on pottery of a man with a dhol hanging from his neck, and a woman holding a drum under her left arm.

=== Vedic and ancient era ===
The Vedas (c. 1500–c. 800 BCE, Vedic period) document rituals with performing arts and play. For example, the Shatapatha Brahmana (c. 800–700 BCE) has verses in chapter 13.2 written in the form of a play between two actors. Tala or taal is an ancient music concept traceable to Vedic era texts of Hinduism, such as the Samaveda and methods for singing the Vedic hymns. Smriti (500 BCE to 100 BCE) post-Vedic Hindu texts include Valmiki's Ramayana (500 BCE to 100 BCE) which mentions dance and music (dance by Apsaras such as Urvashi, Rambha, Menaka, Tilottama Panchāpsaras, and Ravana's wives excelling in nrityageeta or "singing and dancing" and nritavaditra or "playing musical instruments"), music and singing by Gandharvas, several string instruments (vina, tantri, bīn, vipanci and vallaki similar to veena), wind instruments (shankha, venu and venugana – likely a mouth organ made by tying several flutes together), raga (including kaushika such as raag kaushik dhwani), vocal registers (seven svara or sur, ana or ekashurti drag note, murchana the regulated rise and fall of voice in matra and tripramana three-fold teen taal laya such as drut or quick, madhya or middle, and vilambit or slow), and poetry recitation in the Bala Kanda (first book of the Ramayana) and also in the Uttara Kanda (last book) by Luv and Kusha in marga style.

There are several references to music and Panns in the ancient pre-Sangam and Sangam literature starting from the earliest known work Tholkappiyam (500 BCE). Among Sangam literature, Mathuraikkanci refers to women singing sevvazhi pann to invoke the mercy of God during childbirth. In Tolkappiyam, the five landscapes of the Sangam literature had each an associated Pann, each describing the mood of the song associated with that landscape. Among the numerous panns that find mention in the ancient Tamil literature are, Ambal Pann, which is suitable to be played on the flute, sevvazhi pann on the Yazh (lute), Nottiram and Sevvazhi expressing pathos, the captivating Kurinji pann and the invigorating Murudappann. Pann (Tamil: பண்) is the melodic mode used by the Tamil people in their music since the ancient times. The ancient panns over centuries evolved first into a pentatonic scale and later into the seven note Carnatic Sargam. But from the earliest times, Tamil Music is heptatonic and known as Ezhisai (ஏழிசை).

Sanskrit saint-poet Jayadeva, who was the great composer and illustrious master of classical music, shaped Odra-Magadhi style music and had great influence on Odissi Sangita.

Śārṅgadeva composed Sangita-Ratnakara, one of the most important Sanskrit musicological texts from India, which is regarded as the definitive text in both Hindustani music and Carnatic music traditions of Indian classical music.

Assamese poet Madhava Kandali, writer of Saptakanda Ramayana, lists several instruments in his version of "Ramayana", such as mardala, khumuchi, bhemachi, dagar, gratal, ramtal, tabal, jhajhar, jinjiri, bheri mahari, tokari, dosari, kendara, dotara, vina, rudra-vipanchi, etc. (meaning that these instruments existed since his time in the 14th century or earlier). The Indian system of notation is perhaps the world's oldest and most elaborate.

=== Medieval era ===
In the early 14th century under the Khiljis, there were concerts and competitions between Hindustani and Carnatic musicians.

In late 15th century, music golden era started, the Dhupad school of music was established in Gwalior. Raja Man Singh Tomar complied music treatise in his book called Manakautuhala. Tanasena or Tansen popularized Hindustani classical music. Many celebrated singers and composers like Jagananth Kaviral, Swami Haridasa, Baiju Bawra, Nayaka Baksu, Mohamud Lohang joined Gwalior court as musicians.

From the 16th century onwards, treatises written on music were Sangitamava Chandrika, Gita Prakasha, Sangita Kalalata and Natya Manorama.

=== Twentieth century ===
In the early 1960s Jazz pioneers such as John Coltrane and George Harrison collaborated with Indian instrumentalists and started to use Indian instruments such as sitar in their songs. In the late 1970s and early 1980s, rock and roll fusions with Indian music were well known throughout Europe and North America. In the late 1980s, Indian-British artists fused Indian and Western traditions to make the Asian Underground. In the new millennium, American hip-hop has featured Indian filmi and bhangra. Mainstream hip-hop artists have sampled songs from Bollywood movies and have collaborated with Indian artists, such as Timbaland's "Indian Flute"

In 2010, Laura Marling and Mumford & Sons collaborated with the Dharohar Project.

== Classical music ==
The two main traditions of Indian classical music are Carnatic music, which is practised predominantly in the peninsular (southern) regions, and Hindustani music, which is found in the northern, eastern and central regions. The basic concepts of this music includes Shruti (microtones), Swaras (notes), Alankar (ornamentations), Raga (melodies improvised from basic grammars), and Tala (rhythmic patterns used in percussion). Its tonal system divides the octave into 22 segments called Shrutis, not all equal but each roughly equal to a quarter of a whole tone of the Western music. Both the classical music are standing on the fundamentals of The seven notes of Indian Classical music. These seven notes are also called as Sapta svara or Sapta Sur. These seven svaras are Sa, Re, Ga, Ma, Pa, Dha and Ni respectively. These Sapta Svaras are spelt as Sa, Re, Ga, Ma, Pa, Dha and Ni, but these are shortforms of Shadja (षड्ज), Rishabha (ऋषभ), Gandhara (गान्धार), Madhyama (मध्यम), Panchama (पंचम), Dhaivata (धैवत) and Nishada (निषाद) respectively. These are also equivalent to Do, Re, Mi, Fa, So, La, Ti. Only these seven svaras built up the Hindustani classical music and the Carnatic classical music. These seven svaras are the fundamentals of a Raga. This seven svaras without any variations in them, are called as Shuddha svaras. Variations in these svaras cause them to be Komal and Tivra svaras. All the other svaras except Sadja(Sa) and Pancham (Pa) can be Komal or Tivra svaras but Sa and Pa are always Shuddha svaras. And hence svaras Sa and Pa are called Achal Svaras, since these svaras don't move from their original position while svaras Ra, Ga, Ma, Dha, Ni are called Chal Svaras, since these svaras move from their original position.

    Sa, Re, Ga, Ma, Pa, Dha, Ni - Shuddha Svaras
   
    Re, Ga, Dha, Ni - Komal Svaras 
  
    Ma - Tivra Svaras

Sangeet Natak Academy recognizes eight classical dance and music forms, namely Bharatanatyam, Kathak, Kuchipudi, Odissi, Kathakali, Sattriya, Manipuri and Mohiniyattam. Additionally, India's Ministry of culture also includes Chhau in its classical list.

=== Carnatic music ===
Carnatic music can be traced to the 14th - 15th centuries AD and thereafter. It originated in South India during the rule of Vijayanagar Empire through the Keerthanas composed by Purandara Dasa. Like Hindustani music, it is melodic, with improvised variations, but tends to have more fixed compositions. It consists of a composition with improvised embellishments added to the piece in the forms of Raga Alapana, Kalpanaswaram, Neraval and, in the case of more advanced students, Ragam Thanam Pallavi. The main emphasis is on the vocals as most compositions are written to be sung, and even when played on instruments, they are meant to be performed in a singing style (known as gāyaki). Around 300 ragams are in use today. Annamayya is the first known composer in Carnatic music. He is widely regarded as the Andhra Pada kavitā Pitāmaha (Godfather of Telugu song-writing).

Purandara Dasa is considered the father of Carnatic music, while the later musicians Tyagaraja, Shyama Shastry and Muthuswami Dikshitar are considered the trinity of Carnatic music.

Noted artists of Carnatic music include Ariyakudi Ramanuja Iyengar (the father of the current concert format), Palghat Mani Iyer, Madurai Mani Iyer, Semmangudi Srinivasa Iyer, Nedunuri Krishnamurthy Alathur Brothers, M. S. Subbulakshmi, Lalgudi Jayaraman, Balamuralikrishna, T. N. Seshagopalan, K. J. Yesudas, N. Ramani, Umayalpuram K. Sivaraman, Sanjay Subrahmanyan, T. M. Krishna, Bombay Jayashri, Aruna Sairam, Mysore Manjunath,

Every December, the city of Chennai in India has its eight-week-long Music Season, which is the world's largest cultural event.

Carnatic music has served as the foundation for most music in South India, including folk music, festival music and has also extended its influence to film music in the past 100–150 years or so.

=== Hindustani music ===
The tradition of Hindustani music dates back to Vedic times where the hymns in the Samaveda, an ancient religious text, were sung as Samagana and not chanted. It diverged from Carnatic music around the 13th–14th centuries CE, primarily due to Islamic influences. Developed over several centuries, it has contemporary traditions established primarily in India but also in Pakistan and Bangladesh. In contrast to Carnatic music, the other main Indian classical music tradition originating from the South, Hindustani music was not only influenced by ancient Hindu musical traditions, historical Vedic philosophy and native Indian sounds but also enriched by the Persian performance practices of the Mughals. Classical genres are dhrupad, dhamar, khyal, tarana and sadra, and there are also several semi-classical forms.

The root of the name C(K)arnatic music is derived from Sanskrit. Karnam means ears and Atakam means that which is sweet or that which lingers on.

=== Light classical music ===
There are many types of music which comes under the category of light classical or semi-classical. Some of the forms are Thumri, Dadra, Bhajan, Ghazal, Chaiti, Kajri, Tappa, Natya Sangeet and Qawwali. These forms place emphasis on explicitly seeking emotion from the audience, as opposed to the classical forms.

== Folk music ==
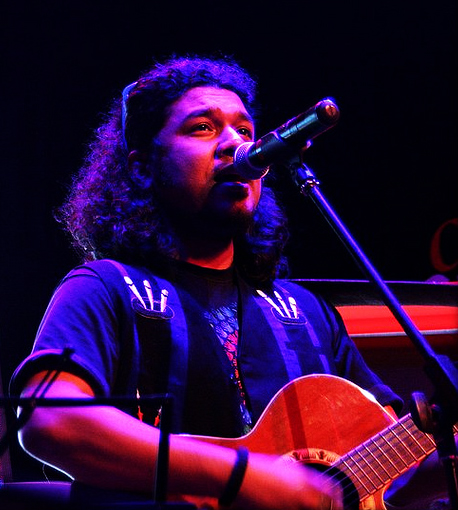
Papon, lead vocalist and founder of the folk-fusion band Papon and The East India Company

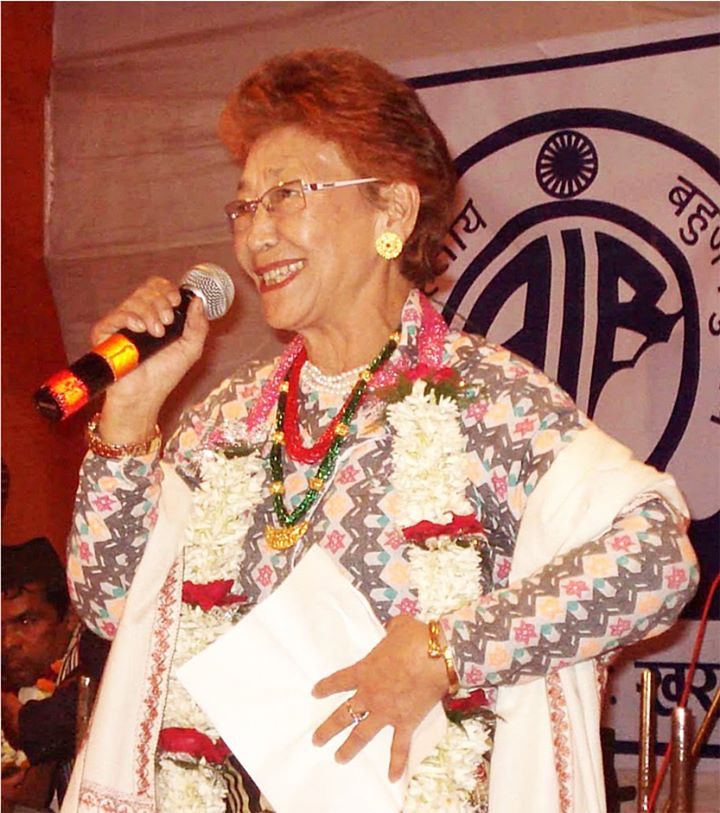
Hira Devi Waiba, pioneer of Nepali folk songs in India

=== Tamang Selo ===
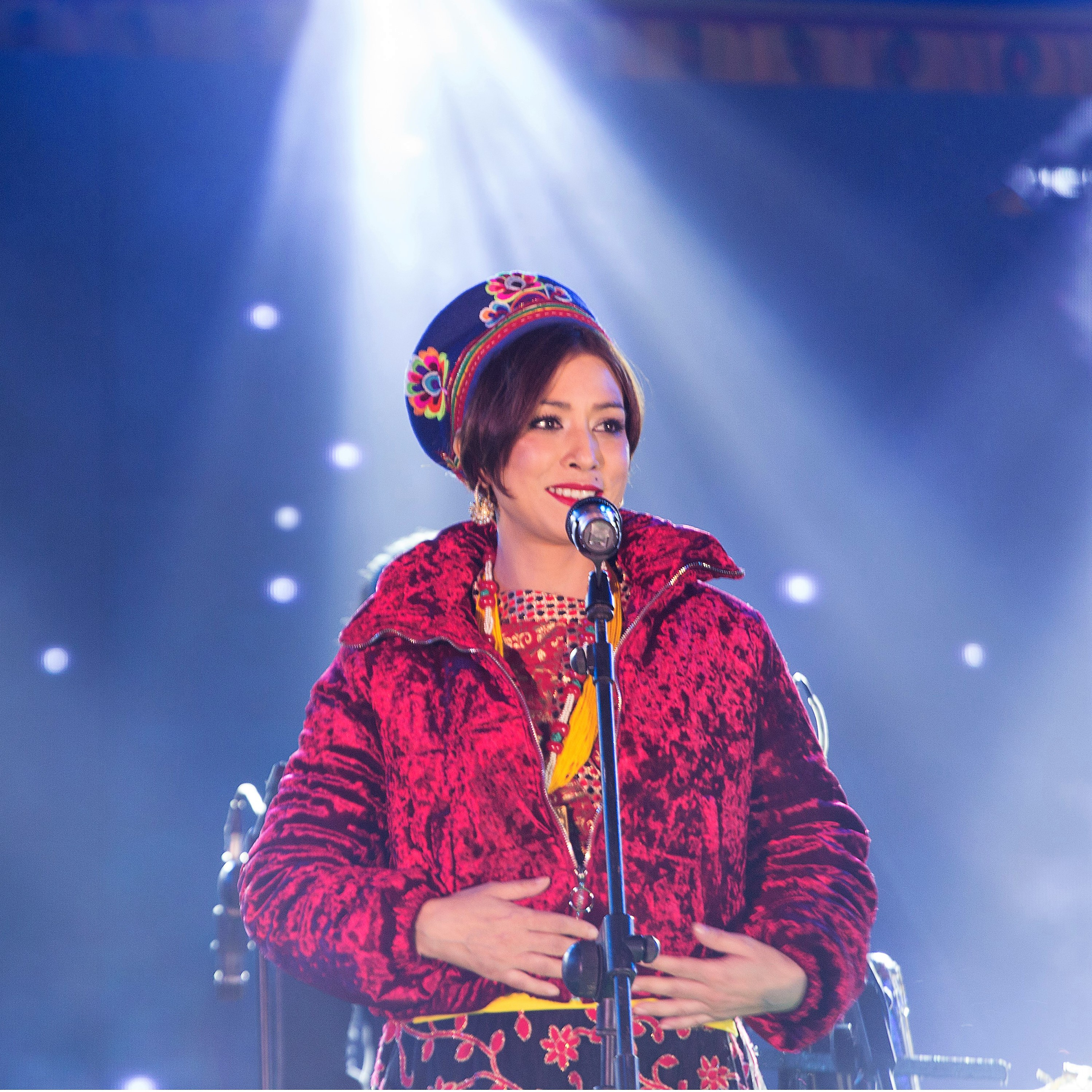
Navneet Aditya Waiba- Folk singer

This is a musical genre of the Tamang people and popular amongst the Nepali speaking community in West Bengal, Sikkim, India and around the world. It is accompanied by Tamang instruments, the Madal, Damphu and Tungna, although nowadays musicians have taken to modern instruments. A Tamang Selo can be catchy and lively or slow and melodious, and is usually sung to convey sorrow, love, happiness or day-to-day incidents and stories of folklore.

Hira Devi Waiba is hailed as the pioneer of Nepali folk songs and Tamang Selo. Her song 'Chura ta Hoina Astura' (चुरा त होइन अस्तुरा) is said to be the first Tamang Selo ever recorded. She has sung nearly 300 songs through her musical career spanning 40 years. After Waiba's death in 2011, her son Satya Aditya Waiba (producer/manager) and Navneet Aditya Waiba (singer) collaborated and re-recorded her most iconic songs and released an album titled Ama Lai Shraddhanjali (आमालाई श्रद्धाञ्जली-Tribute to Mother). The duo are the only individuals in the Nepali folk music genre who produce authentic traditional Nepali folk songs without adulteration or modernisation.

=== Bhangra and Giddha ===
Bhangra (Punjabi: ਭੰਗੜਾ) is a form of dance-oriented folk music of Punjab. The present musical

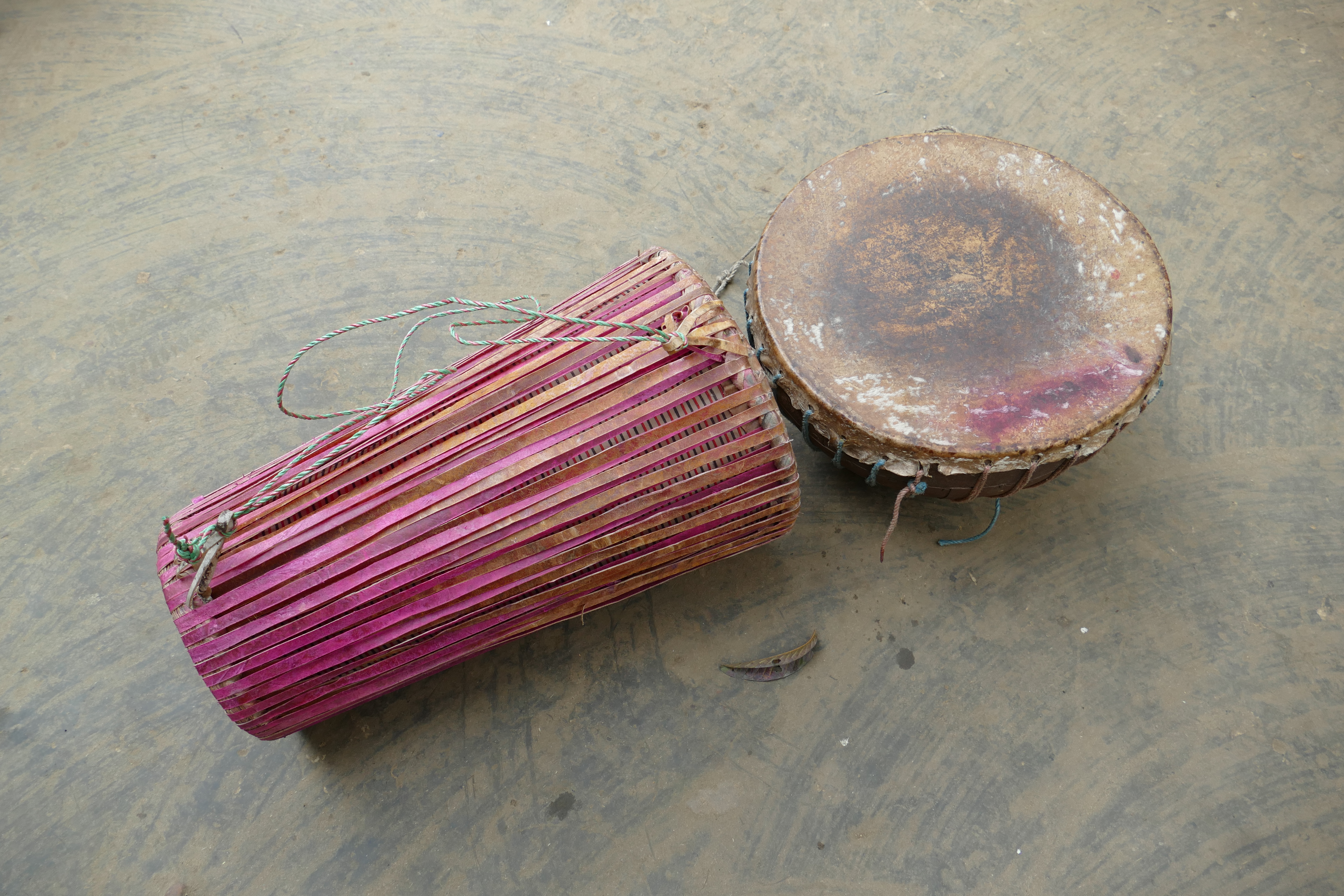
Tamak' (r.) and Tumdak' (l.) - typical drums of the Santhal people, photographed in a village in Dinajpur district, Bangladesh.

style is derived from non-traditional musical accompaniment to the riffs of Punjab called by the same name. The female dance of Punjab region is known as Giddha (Punjabi: ਗਿੱਧਾ).

=== Bihu and Borgeet ===
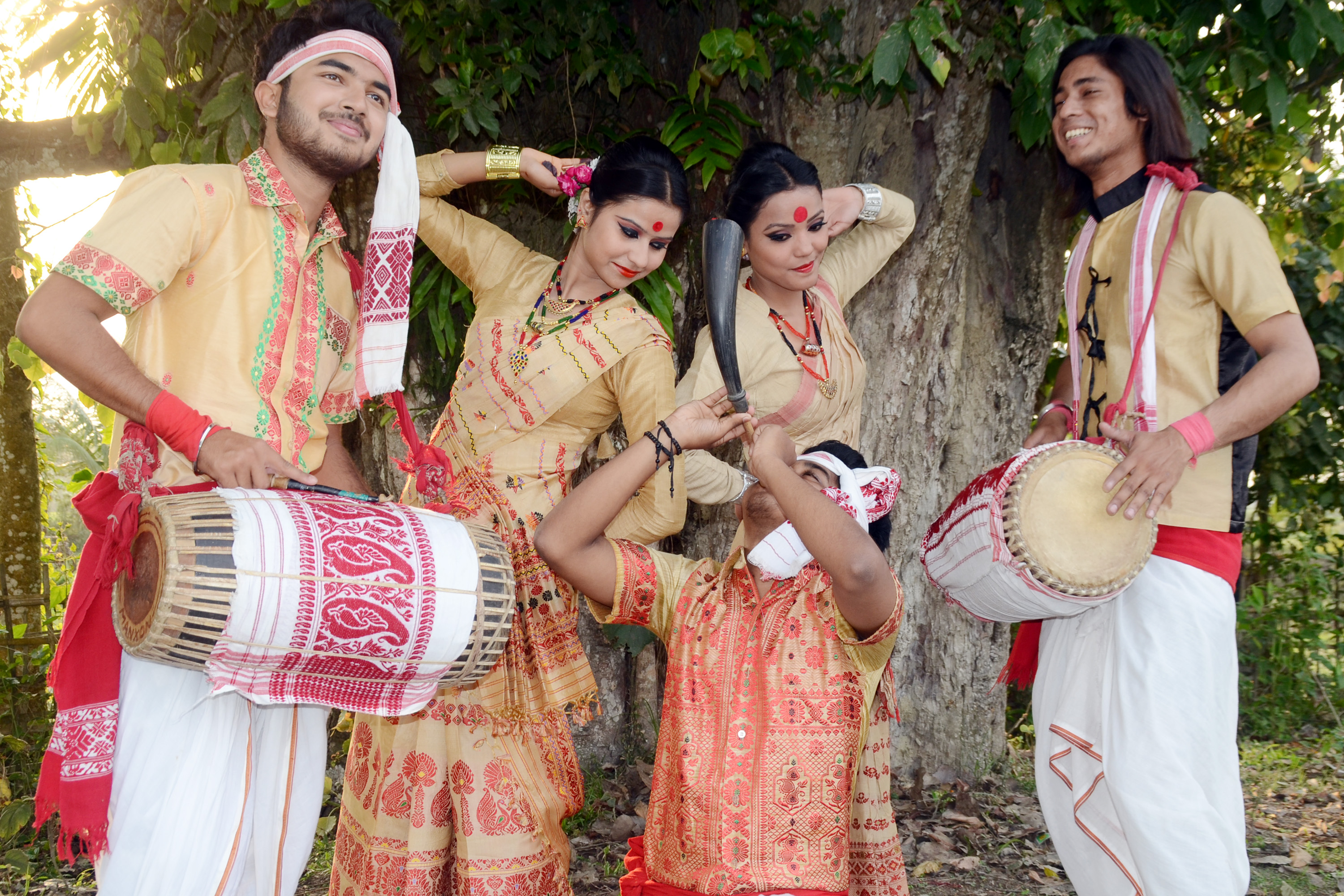
Assamese youth performing Bihu.

Bihu (Assamese: বিহু) is the festival of New Year of Assam falling on mid-April. This is a festival of nature and mother earth where the first day is for the cows and buffaloes. The second day of the festival is for the man. Bihu dances and songs accompanied by traditional drums and wind instruments are an essential part of this festival. Bihu songs are energetic and with beats to welcome the festive spring. Assamese drums (dhol), Pepa(usually made from buffalo horn), Gogona are major instruments used.

Borgeets (Assamese: বৰগীত) are lyrical songs that are set to specific ragas but not necessarily to any tala. These songs, composed by Srimanta Sankardeva and Madhavdeva in the 15th–16th centuries, are used to begin prayer services in monasteries, e.g. Satra and Namghar associated with the Ekasarana Dharma; and they also belong to the repertoire of Music of Assam outside the religious context. They are a lyrical strain that express the religious sentiments of the poets reacting to different situations, and differ from other lyrics associated with the Ekasarana Dharma.

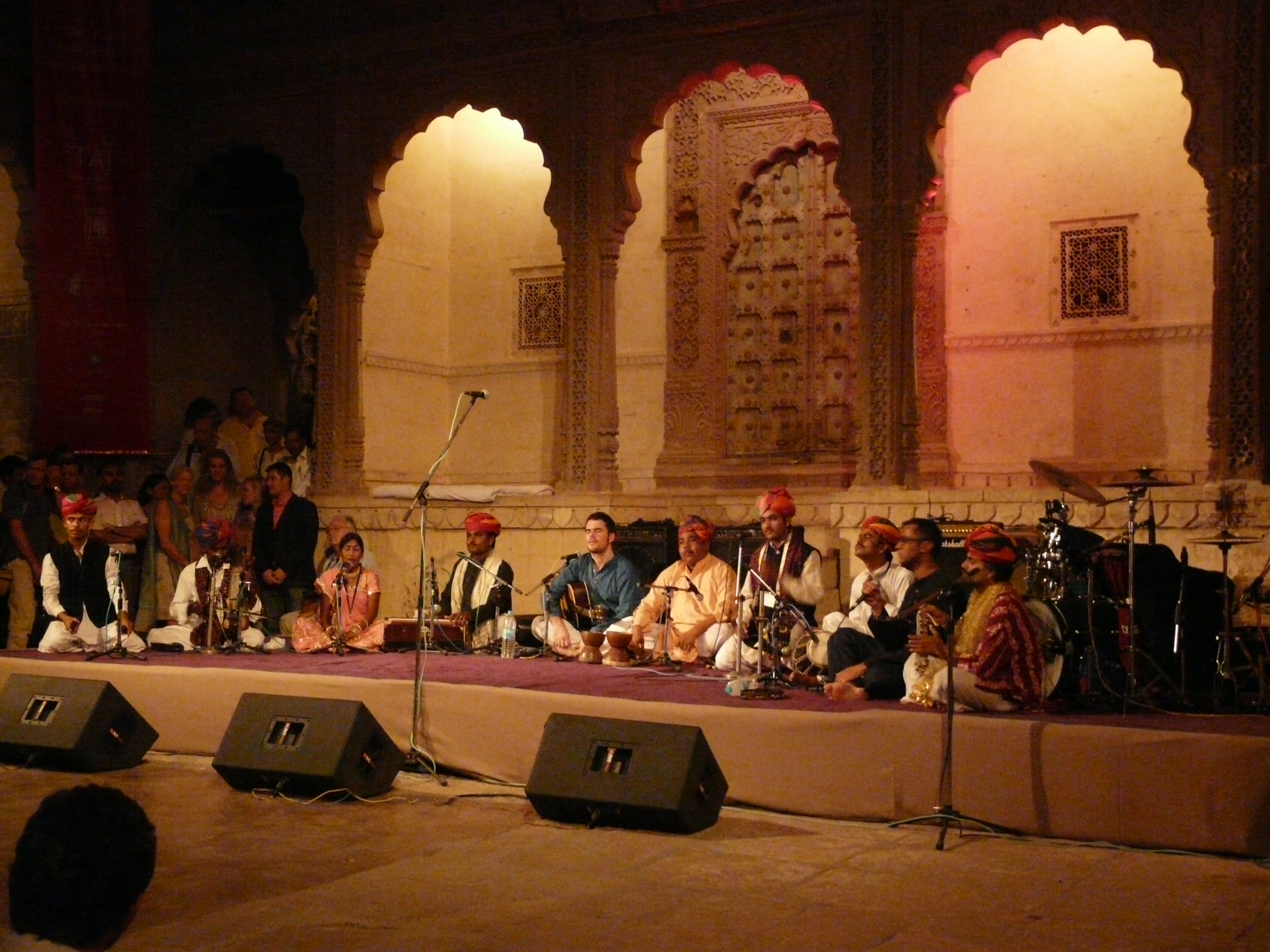
Group of Dharohar folk musicians performing in Mehrangarh Fort, Jodhpur, India

Prominent instruments used in borgeets are Negera,Taal, Khols etc.

=== Dandiya ===
Dandiya or Raas is a form of Gujarati cultural dance that is performed with sticks. The present musical style is derived from the traditional musical accompaniment to the folk dance. It is practiced mainly in the state of Gujarat. There is also another type of dance and music associated with Dandiya/Raas called Garba.

=== Gaana ===
Gaana is a rap-like "collection of rhythms, beats and sensibilities native to the Dalits of Chennai." It evolved over the past two centuries, combining influences from the siddhars (tantric adepts) of ancient Tamilakam, Tamil Sufi saints, and more. Gaana songs are performed at weddings, stage shows, political rallies, and funerals. Performers sing about a wide range of topics, but the essence of gaana is said to be "angst and melancholy" based in life's struggles. In the past few decades, the genre has entered the music of the mainstream Tamil film industry and gained popularity. Contemporary gaana bands like The Casteless Collective are bringing the genre to new audiences while using it for social activism, especially against caste discrimination.

=== Haryanvi ===
Video of Dhol, string instrument (Ektara) and Been musicians at Surajkund International Crafts Mela (c. 12 Feb 2012).

Haryana folk music has two main forms: classical folk music of Haryana and desi folk music of Haryana (country music of Haryana). They take the form of ballads and pangs of parting of lovers, valor and bravery, harvest and happiness. Haryana is rich in musical tradition and even places have been named after ragas, for example Charkhi Dadri district has many villages named as Nandyam, Sarangpur, Bilawala, Brindabana, Todi, Asaveri, Jaisri, Malakoshna, Hindola, Bhairvi and Gopi Kalyana.

=== Himachali ===
Himachal's folk music varies according to the event or the festival. One of the most popular style of music is Nati Music, where nati being the traditional dance that is done on the song. Nati Music is usually celebratory, and done in fairs or other occasions such as marriages.

=== Jhumair and Domkach ===
Jhumair and Domkach are Nagpuri folk music. The musical instruments used in folk music and dance are Dhol, Mandar, Bansi, Nagara, Dhak, Shehnai, Khartal, Narsinga etc.

=== Lavani ===
Lavani comes from the word Lavanya which means "beauty". This is one of the most popular forms of dance and music that is practiced all over Maharashtra. It has, in fact, become a necessary part of the Maharashtrian folk dance performances. Traditionally, the songs are sung by female artists, but male artists may occasionally sing Lavanis. The dance format associated with Lavani is known as Tamasha. Lavani is a combination of traditional song and dance, which particularly performed to the enchanting beats of 'Dholaki', a drum-like instrument. The dance is performed by attractive women wearing nine-yard saris. They are sung in a quick tempo. Lavani originated in the arid region of Maharashtra and Madhya Pradesh.

=== Manipuri ===
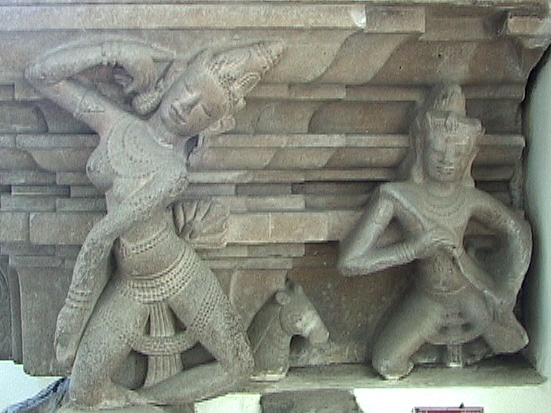
Gandharva as dancers are found sculpted in early medieval era temples of Southeast Asia, East Asia, Siberia, Micronesia, Polynesia and the Arctic. The Meiteis believe that they are the Gandharvas.

Music of Manipur and Manipuri dance are heritage of Manipuri people. According to tradition of the Manipuri people in the Himalayan foothills and valleys connecting India to Burma, they are the Gandharvas (celestial musicians and dancers) in the Vedic texts, and historic texts of Manipuri people calls the region as Gandharva-desa. The Vedic Usha, the goddess of the dawn, is a cultural motif for Manipuri women, and in the Indian tradition, it was Usha who created and taught the art of feminine dance to girls. This oral tradition of women's dance is celebrated as Chingkheirol in the Manipuri tradition.

The ancient Sanskrit texts such as the Mahabharata epic mentions Manipur, where Arjuna meets and falls in love with Chitragada. Dance is called Jagoi in a major Meitei language of the region and it traces a long tradition in Manipur. Lai Haraoba dance likely has ancient roots and shares many similarities with dance postures of Nataraja and his legendary disciple called Tandu (locally called Tangkhu). Similarly, as does the dance related to commoner Khamba and princess Thoibi – who perform as pan-Indian Shiva and Parvati, in the legendary tragic love story of Khamba-Thoibi found in the Manipuri epic Moirang Parba.

=== Marfa music ===
Hadrani Marfa, or simply Marfa music, introduced during the 18th century in Hyderabad State by the East African Siddi community from Afro-Arab music of Hadhramawt in Yemen, is a form of celebratory rhythmic music and dance among the Hyderabadi Muslims, played with high tempo using Marfa instrument, daff, Dhol, sticks, steel pots and wooden strips called thapi.

=== Mizo ===
Mizo music originated when couplets were developed during the settlement of Thantlang in Burma between 1300 and 1400 CE, and folk songs developed during this period were dar hla (songs on gong); Bawh hla (War chants), Hlado (Chants of hunting); Nauawih hla (Cradle songs) A greater development of songs can be seen from the settlement of Lentlang in Burma, estimated between late 15th to 17th Century CE. The Mizo occupied the present Mizoram from the late 17th century. The pre-colonial period, that is from the 18th to 19th century was another important era in the history of Mizo folk literature. Prior to the annexation by the British Government, the Mizo occupied the present Mizoram for two centuries. In comparison with the folk songs of Thantlang and Lentlang settlement, the songs of this period are more developed in its number, form and contents. The languages are more polished and the flows also better. Most of the songs of this period are named after the composers.

=== Odissi ===
Sample of Odissi performance art with the 17th Canto from the 17th century Odia poet Upendra Bhanja's 'Baidehisha Bilasa' being sung. Odissi and Kathakali drama traditions have had an important influence on India's narrative traditions.

Jayadeva, the 12th century sanskrit saint-poet, the great composer and illustrious master of classical music, has immense contribution to Odissi music. During his time Odra-Magadhi style music got shaped and achieved its classical status. He indicated the classical ragas prevailing at that time in which these were to be sung. Prior to that there was the tradition of Chhanda which was simple in musical outline. From the 16th century onwards, treatises on music were Sangitamava Chandrika, Gita Prakasha, Sangita Kalalata and Natya Manorama. A couple of treatise namely, Sangita Sarani and Sangi Narayana, were also written in the early path of the 19th century.

Odissi Sangita comprises four classes of music namely Dhruvapada, Chitrapada, Chitrakala and Panchal, described in the ancient oriya music texts. The chief Odissi and Shokabaradi. Odissi Sangita (music) is a synthesis of four classes of music, i.e. Dhruvapada, Chitrapada, Chitrakala and Panchal, described in the above-mentioned texts.

The great exponents of Odissi music in modern times are the Late Singhari Shyamasundara Kar, Markandeya Mahapatra, Kashinath Pujapanda, Balakrushna Das, Gopal Chandra Panda, Ramhari Das, Bhubaneswari Misra, Shymamani Devi and Sunanda Patnaik, who have achieved eminence in classical music.

=== Rabindra Sangeet (music of Bengal) ===
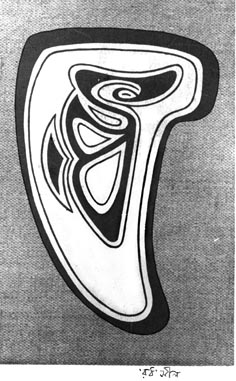
Rabindranath Tagore's Bengali-language initials are worked into this "Ro-Tho" wooden seal, stylistically similar to designs used in traditional Haida carvings. Tagore embellished his manuscripts with such art.

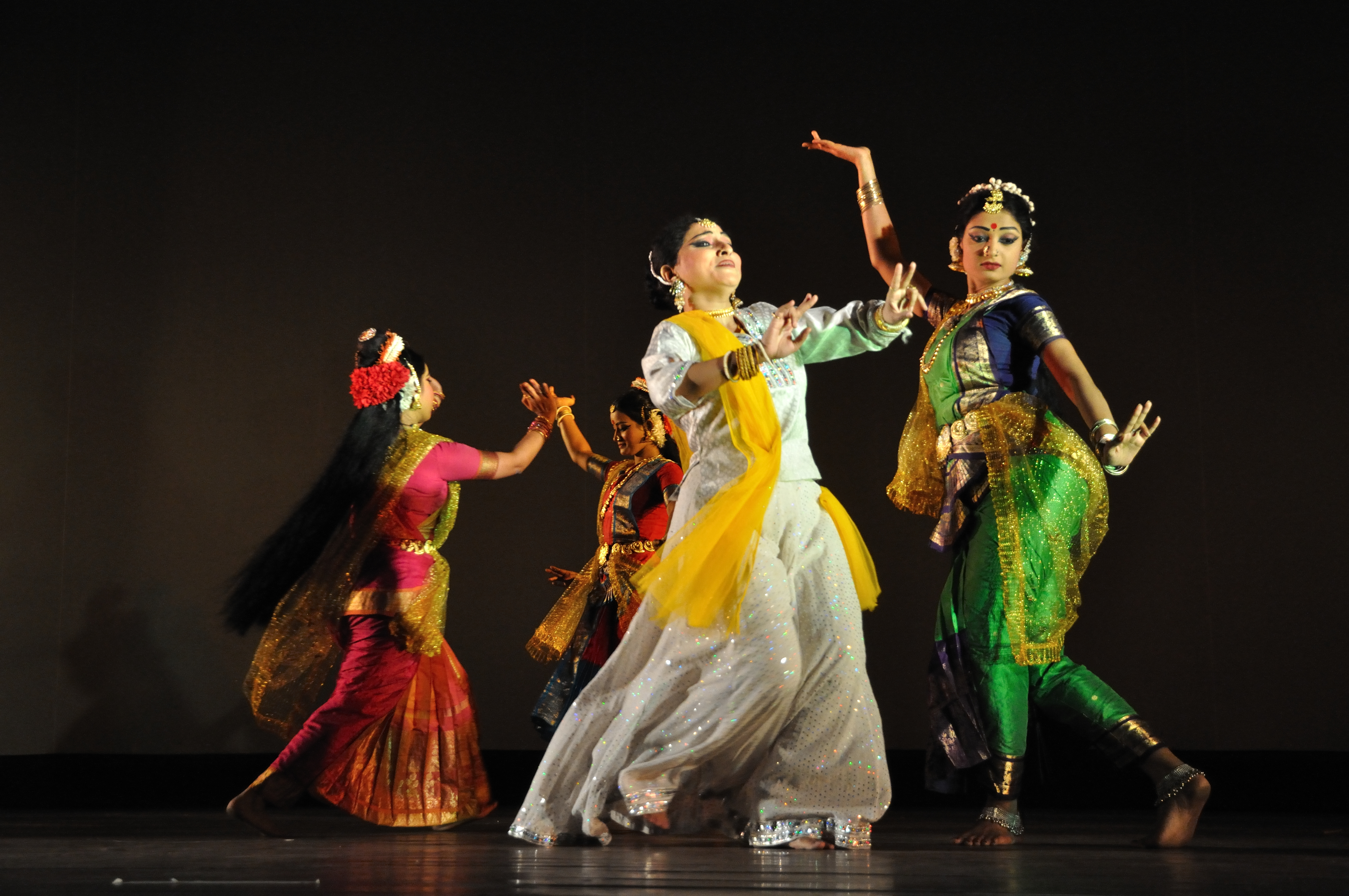
Dance accompanied by Rabindra Sangeet

Rabindra Sangeet (Bengali: রবীন্দ্রসঙ্গীত Robindro Shonggit, Bengali pronunciation: [ɾobindɾo ʃoŋɡit]), also known as Tagore songs, are songs written and composed by Rabindranath Tagore. They have distinctive characteristics in the music of Bengal, popular in India and Bangladesh. "Sangeet" means music, "Rabindra Sangeet" means music (or more aptly songs) of Rabindra.

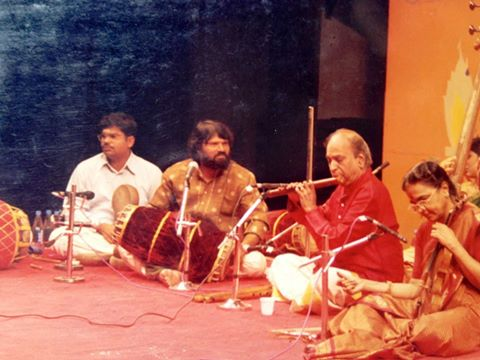
N. Ramani and N Rajam accompanied by T. S. Nandakumar

Tagore wrote some 2,230 songs in Bengali, now known as Rabindra Sangeet, using classical music and traditional folk music as sources.

Tagore wrote national anthems of India and Bangladesh, and influenced the national anthem of Sri Lanka.

=== Shyama Sangeet (music of Bengal) ===
Generally all music dedicated to goddess Mother Kali is called 'Shyama Sangeet' in Bengali. Two famous singers of this Bengali Shyama Sangeet are Pannalal Bhattacharya and Dhananjay Bhattacharya. Pannalal Bhattacharya's elder brother Prafulla Bhattacharya and middle brother Dhananjay Bhattacharya were the first music teachers of saint artist Pannalal Bhattacharya. Dhananjay Bhattacharya stopped singing devotional songs after finding devotional spirit in his brother Pannalal. However, after the demise of Pannalal Bhattacharya, he contributed again in Bengali music with many devotional songs by his sweet, melodious voice.

=== Rajasthani ===
Rajasthan has a very diverse cultural collection of musician castes, including Langas, Sapera, Bhopa, Jogi and Manganiyar (lit. "the ones who ask/beg"). Rajasthan Diary quotes it as a soulful, full-throated music with harmonious diversity. The melodies of Rajasthan come from a variety of instruments. The stringed variety includes the Sarangi, Ravanahatha, Kamayacha, Morsing and Ektara. Percussion instruments come in all shapes and sizes from the huge Nagaras and Dhols to the tiny Damrus. The Daf and Chang are a favorite of Holi (the festival of colours) revelers. Flutes and bagpipers come in local flavors such as Shehnai, Poongi, Algoza, Tarpi, Been and Bankia.

Rajasthani music is derived from a combination of string instruments, percussion instruments and wind instruments accompanied by renditions of folk singers. It enjoys a respectable presence in Bollywood music as well.

=== Sufi folk rock / Sufi rock ===
Sufi folk rock contains elements of modern hard rock and traditional folk music with Sufi poetry. While it was pioneered by bands like Junoon in Pakistan it became very popular, especially in northern India.

=== Uttarakhandi ===
The folk music of Uttarakhand is deeply rooted in the natural environment and the hilly terrain of the region. The following themes are commonly identified in the folk music of Uttarakhand: the beauty of nature, the various seasons, festivals, religious traditions, cultural practices, folk stories, historical characters, and the bravery of ancestors. The musical instruments employed in Uttarakhand music include the Dhol, Damoun, Hudka, Turri, Ransingha, Dholki, Daur, Thali, Bhankora and Masakbhaja. Tabla and harmonium are also occasionally employed, especially in recorded folk music from the 1960s onwards. The incorporation of generic Indian and global musical instruments into modern popular music has been a significant development, with singers such as Mohan Upreti, Narendra Singh Negi, Gopal Babu Goswami, and Chandra Singh Rahi playing a pivotal role in this evolution.

== Popular music in India ==
=== Dance music ===
Dance music, more popularly called "DJ music", is mostly played at nightclubs, parties, weddings and other celebrations. It is more popular among youths. It is mostly based on Indian movie music as well as Indian pop music, both of which tend to borrow and modernise the classical and folk dance songs with modern instruments and other innovations.

=== Movie music ===
The biggest form of Indian popular music is Indian film music, making up 72% of the music sales in India. The film industry of India supported music by according reverence to classical music while utilising the western orchestration to support Indian melodies. Music composers, like R. D. Burman, Shankar Jaikishan, S. D. Burman, Laxmikant–Pyarelal, Madan Mohan, Bhupen Hazarika, Naushad Ali, O. P. Nayyar, Hemant Kumar, C. Ramchandra, Salil Chowdhury, Kalyanji Anandji, Ilaiyaraaja, A. R. Rahman, Jatin–Lalit, Anu Malik, Nadeem-Shravan, Harris Jayaraj, Himesh Reshammiya, Vidyasagar, Shankar–Ehsaan–Loy, Salim–Sulaiman, Pritam, M. S. Viswanathan, K. V. Mahadevan, Ghantasala and S. D. Batish employed the principles of harmony while retaining classical and folk flavor. Reputed names in the domain of Indian classical music like Ravi Shankar, Vilayat Khan, Ali Akbar Khan and Ram Narayan have also composed music for films. Traditionally, in Indian films, the voice for the songs is not provided by the actors, they are provided by the professional playback singers, to sound more developed, melodious and soulful, while actors lipsynch on the screen. In the past, only a handful of singers provided the voice in films. These include Kishore Kumar, K. J. Yesudas, Mohammed Rafi, Mukesh, S. P. Balasubrahmanyam, T. M. Soundararajan, Hemant Kumar, Manna Dey, P. Susheela, Lata Mangeshkar, Asha Bhonsle, K. S. Chitra, Geeta Dutt, S. Janaki, Shamshad Begum, Suraiya, Noorjahan and Suman Kalyanpur. Recent playback singers include Udit Narayan, Kumar Sanu, Kailash Kher, Alisha Chinai, KK, Shaan, S. P. Charan, Madhushree, Shreya Ghoshal, Nihira Joshi, Kavita Krishnamurthy, Hariharan, Ilaiyaraaja, A. R. Rahman, Sonu Nigam, Sukhwinder Singh, Kunal Ganjawala, Anu Malik, Sunidhi Chauhan, Anushka Manchanda, Raja Hasan, Arijit Singh and Alka Yagnik. Rock bands like Indus Creed, Indian Ocean, Silk Route and Euphoria have gained mass appeal with the advent of cable music television.

=== Pop music ===
Indian pop music is based on an amalgamation of Indian folk and classical music, and modern beats from different parts of the world. Pop music really started in the South Asian region with the playback singer Ahmed Rushdi's song ‘Ko Ko Korina’ in 1966, then by Kishore Kumar in the early 1970s.

After that, much of Indian Pop music comes from the Indian Film Industry, and until the 1990s, few singers like Usha Uthup, Sharon Prabhakar, and Peenaz Masani outside it were popular. Since then, pop singers in the latter group have included Daler Mehndi, Baba Sehgal, Alisha Chinai, KK, Shantanu Mukherjee a.k.a. Shaan, Sagarika, Colonial Cousins (Hariharan, Lesle Lewis), Lucky Ali, and Sonu Nigam, and music composers like Zila Khan or Jawahar Wattal, who made top selling albums with, Daler Mehndi, Shubha Mudgal, Baba Sehgal, Shweta Shetty and Hans Raj Hans.

Besides those listed above, popular Indi-pop singers include Sanam, Gurdas Maan, Sukhwinder Singh, Papon, Zubeen Garg, Raghav Sachar Rageshwari, Vandana Vishwas, Devika Chawla, Bombay Vikings, Asha Bhosle, Sunidhi Chauhan, Anushka Manchanda, Bombay Rockers, Anu Malik, Jazzy B, Malkit Singh, Raghav, Jay Sean, Jaimin Rajani, Juggy D, Rishi Rich, Udit Swaraj, Sheila Chandra, Bally Sagoo, Punjabi MC, Beno, Bhangra Knights, Mehnaz, Sanober and Vaishali Samant.

Recently, Indian pop has taken an interesting turn with the "remixing" of songs from past Indian movie songs, new beats being added to them.

=== Patriotic music ===
Patriotic feelings have been instigated within Indians through music since the era of the freedom struggle. Jana Gana Mana, the national anthem of India by Rabindranath Tagore, is largely credited for uniting India through music and Vande Mataram by Bankim Chandra Chattopadhyay as the national song of India. Patriotic songs were also written in many regional languages such as Biswo Bizoyi No Zuwan in Assamese. Post-independence songs such as Aye mere watan ke logo, Mile Sur Mera Tumhara, Ab Tumhare Hawale Watan Saathiyo, Maa Tujhe Salaam by A.R. Rahman have been responsible for consolidating feelings of national integration and unity in diversity.

=== Western music adoption in India ===
Western world's music has been adopted in India, by creating fusion music in India which in turn have enriched and created global genres of western music.

==== Goa trance ====
Goa trance, an electronic music style that originated during the late 1980s in Goa in India, has funky, drone-like basslines, similar to the techno minimalism of 21st century psytrance. Psychedelic trance developed from Goa trance. In the late 1960s and early 1970s, Goa became popular as a hippie capital, which resulted in evolution of Goa trance throughout the 1980s by mixing the spiritual culture of India with western musical elements of industrial music, new beat and electronic body music (EBM), and the actual Goa trance style became established by the early 1990s.

==== Jazz and blues ====
Jazz in India was first performed regularly in the metropoles Calcutta and Bombay in the early or middle 1920s. From the 1930s to the 1950s is called as the golden age of jazz in India, when jazz musicians like Leon Abbey, Crickett Smith, Creighton Thompson, Ken Mac, Roy Butler, Teddy Weatherford (who recorded with Louis Armstrong), and Rudy Jackson who toured India to avoid the racial discrimination they faced in the United States. In the 1930s, jazz musicians played in the nightclubs of Bombay, such as at the Taj Mahal hotel ballroom, many of these musicians were Goans most whom also worked in the Bollywood film industry and were responsible for the introduction of genres like jazz and swing to Hindi film music.

Indian blues is less prevalent in India than jazz. Interest in the blues in India has only been incidental due to the shared ancestry with jazz.

==== Rock and metal music ====
===== Indian rock =====
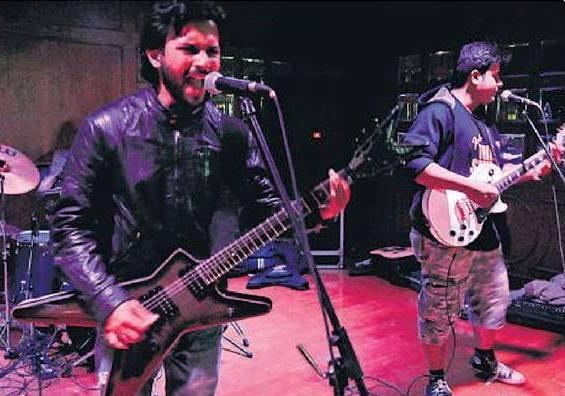
Nicotine playing at 'Pedal to the Metal', TDS, Indore, India in 2014. The band is known for being the pioneer of metal music in Central India.

The rock music scene in India is small compared to the filmi or fusion musicality scenes. Rock music in India has its origins in the 1960s when international stars such as the Beatles visited India and brought their music with them. These artists' collaboration with Indian musicians such as Ravi Shankar and Zakir Hussain have led to the development of raga rock. International shortwave radio stations such as The Voice of America, BBC, and Radio Ceylon played a major part in bringing Western pop, folk, and rock music to the masses. Indian rock bands began to gain prominence only much later, around the late 1980s.

It was around this time that the rock band Indus Creed formerly known as The Rock Machine got itself noticed on the international stage with hits like Rock N Roll Renegade. Other bands quickly followed. With the introduction of MTV in the early 1990s, Indians began to be exposed to various forms of rock such as grunge and speed metal, impacting the national scene. The cities of the North Eastern Region, mainly Guwahati and Shillong, Kolkata, Delhi, Mumbai and Bangalore have emerged as major melting pots for rock and metal enthusiasts. Bangalore has been the hub for rock and metal movement in India. Some prominent bands include Nicotine, Voodoo Child, Indian Ocean, Kryptos, Thermal and a Quarter, Demonic Resurrection, Motherjane, Avial, Bloodywood and Parikrama. Rock-specific labels such as DogmaTone Records and Eastern Fare Music Foundation have since emerged, supporting Indian rock acts.

From Central India, Nicotine, an Indore-based metal band, has been credited with pioneering metal music in the region.

===== Raga rock =====
Raga rock is rock or pop music with a heavy Indian influence, either in its construction, its timbre, or its use of instrumentation, such as the sitar and tabla. Raga and other forms of classical Indian music began to influence many rock groups during the 1960s; most famously the Beatles. The first traces of "raga rock" can be heard on songs such as "See My Friends" by the Kinks and the Yardbirds' "Heart Full of Soul", released the previous month, featured a sitar-like riff by guitarist Jeff Beck. The Beatles song "Norwegian Wood (This Bird Has Flown)", which first appeared on the band's 1965 album Rubber Soul, was the first western pop song to actually incorporate the sitar (played by lead guitarist George Harrison). The Byrds' March 1966 single "Eight Miles High" and its B-side "Why" were also influential in originating the musical subgenre. Indeed, the term "raga rock" was coined by The Byrds' publicist in the press releases for the single and was first used in print by journalist Sally Kempton in her review of "Eight Miles High" for The Village Voice. George Harrison's interest in Indian music, popularised the genre in the mid-1960s with songs such as "Love You To", "Tomorrow Never Knows" (credited to Lennon-McCartney), "Within You Without You" and "The Inner Light". The rock acts of the sixties both in turn influenced British and American groups and Indian acts to develop a later form of Indian rock.

==== Western classical music ====
Despite more than a century of exposure to Western classical music and two centuries of British colonialism, classical music in India has never gained significant popularity..

However, Western classical music education has improved with the help of certain institutions in India, including KM Music Conservatory (founded by Oscar-winning Composer A.R. Rahman), Calcutta School of Music, Eastern Fare Music Foundation, In 1930, Mehli Mehta set up the Bombay Symphony Orchestra. His son Zubin Mehta has enjoyed a long international conducting career. The Bombay Chamber Orchestra (BCO) was founded in 1962. Delhi School of Music, Delhi Music Academy, Guitarmonk and others supporting Western classical music.. In 2006, the Symphony Orchestra of India was founded, housed at the NCPA in Mumbai. It is today the only professional symphony orchestra in India and presents two concert seasons per year, with world-renowned conductors and soloists.

== Globalization of Indian music ==
As per UN, the Indian diaspora is world's largest overseas diaspora with 17.5 million Indian-origin international migrants across the world, who help spread the global soft power of India.

=== Influence on other genres ===
==== Ancient influence on Southeast Asian music genres ====
Historic Indosphere cultural influence zone of Greater India for transmission of elements of Indian elements such as the honorific titles, naming of people, naming of places, mottos of organisations and educational institutes as well as adoption of Hinduism, Buddhism, Indian architecture, martial arts, Indian music and dance, traditional Indian clothing, and Indian cuisine, a process which has also been aided by the ongoing historic expansion of Indian diaspora.

With expansion of Indosphere cultural influence of Greater India, through transmission of Hinduism in Southeast Asia and the Silk Road transmission of Buddhism leading to Indianisation of Southeast Asia through formation of non-Indian southeast Asian native Indianised kingdoms which adopted sanskritized language and other Indian elements such as the honorific titles, naming of people, naming of places, mottos of organisations and educational institutes as well as adoption of Indian architecture, martial arts, Indian music and dance, traditional Indian clothing, and Indian cuisine, a process which has also been aided by the ongoing historic expansion of Indian diaspora.

===== Indonesian and Malay music =====
In Indonesian and Malaysian music, the Dangdut a genre of folk music is partly derived and fused from Hindustani music. It is a very popular because of its melodious instrumentation and vocals. Dangdut features a tabla and gendang beat. Indonesians dance in somewhat similar to the ghoomar while listening to dangdut music, but in a much slower version.

===== Thai music =====
Thai literature and drama draws great inspiration from Indian arts and Hindu legends. Epic of Ramayana is as popular in Thailand as the Ramakien. Two of the most popular classical thai dances the Khon, performed by men wearing ferocious masks, and the Lakhon (Lakhon nai, Lakhon chatri and Lakhon nok), performed by women who play both male and female roles draws inspiration primarily from the Ramakien. Percussion instruments and Piphat, a type of woodwind accompany the dance. Nang talung, a Thai shadow play inspired by South Indian Bommalattam, has shadows made from the pieces of cow or water buffalo hide cut to represent human figures with movable arms and legs are thrown on a screen for the entertainment of spectators.

===== Philippines =====
- Filipino epics and chants inspired by the Indian Hindu religious epics Ramayana and Mahabharta.
  - Alim and Hudhud Oral traditions of Ifugao of Ifugao people of the Cordillera Administrative Region in Luzon island of Philippines, 11 Masterpieces of the Oral and Intangible Heritage of Humanity in 2001 and formally inscribed as a UNESCO Intangible Cultural Heritage in 2008. See also Hudhud – the Ifugao epic.
  - Biag ni Lam-ang (English: "The Life of Lam-ang") is an epic poem of the Ilocano people from the Ilocos region.
  - Ibalong epic of Bikol region of southeast Luzon.
  - "Aginid, Bayok sa atong Tawarik", a Bisayan epic of Cebu.
  - Bayok, an epic of Marano people of northwestern Mindanao .
- Music instrument
  - Kudyapi, native Filipino guitar of Maranao, Manobo and Maguindanao people, is influenced by the Indian classical music concepts of melody and scale.

==== Fusion with traditional music of other nations ====
Sometimes, the music of India is fused with the native traditional music of other countries. For example, Delhi 2 Dublin, a band based in Canada, is known for fusing Indian and Irish music, and Bhangraton is a fusion of Bhangra music with reggaeton.

==== Western world music ====
===== Film music =====
Indian film composer A. R. Rahman wrote the music for Andrew Lloyd Webber's Bombay Dreams, and a musical version of Hum Aapke Hain Koun was staged in London's West End. The Bollywood sports film Lagaan (2001) was nominated for the Academy Award for Best Foreign Language Film, and two other Bollywood films (2002's Devdas and 2006's Rang De Basanti) were nominated for the BAFTA Award for Best Film Not in the English Language.

Danny Boyle's Slumdog Millionaire (2008) was inspired by Bollywood films.

===== Hip-hop and reggae =====
Bhangraton is a fusion of Bhangra music with reggaeton, which itself is a fusion of hip-hop, reggae, and traditional Latin American music.

===== Jazz =====
In early 1960s Jazz pioneers such as John Coltrane—who recorded a composition entitled 'India' during the November 1961 sessions for his album Live at the Village Vanguard (the track was not released until 1963 on Coltrane's album Impressions)—also embraced this fusion. George Harrison (of the Beatles) played the sitar on the song "Norwegian Wood (This Bird Has Flown)" in 1965, which sparked interest from Shankar, who subsequently took Harrison as his apprentice. Jazz innovator Miles Davis recorded and performed with musicians like Khalil Balakrishna, Bihari Sharma, and Badal Roy in his post-1968 electric ensembles. Virtuoso jazz guitarist John McLaughlin spent several years in Madurai learning Carnatic music and incorporated it into many of his acts including Shakti which featured prominent Indian musicians. Other Western artists such as the Grateful Dead, Incredible String Band, the Rolling Stones, the Move and Traffic soon incorporated Indian influences and instruments, and added Indian performers.

Legendary Grateful Dead frontman Jerry Garcia joined guitarist Sanjay Mishra on his classic CD "Blue Incantation" (1995). Mishra also wrote an original score for French Director Eric Heumann for his film Port Djema (1996) which won best score at Hamptons film festival and the Golden Bear at Berlin. in 2000 he recorded Rescue with drummer Dennis Chambers (Carlos Santana, John McLaughlin et al.) and in 2006 Chateau Benares with guests DJ Logic and Keller Williams (guitar and bass).

===== Musical film =====
Since the early 2000s, Bollywood began influencing musical films in the Western world and was instrumental role in reviving the American musical film. Baz Luhrmann said that his musical film, Moulin Rouge! (2001), was inspired by Bollywood musicals; the film incorporated a Bollywood-style dance scene with a song from the film China Gate. The critical and financial success of Moulin Rouge! began a renaissance of Western musical films such as Chicago, Rent, and Dreamgirls.

===== Psychedelic and trance music =====
Psychedelic trance developed from Goa trance.

===== Rock and roll =====
In the late 1970s and early 1980s, rock and roll fusions with Indian music were well known throughout Europe and North America. Ali Akbar Khan's 1955 performance in the United States was perhaps the beginning of this trend. In 1985, a beat-oriented, Raga Rock hybrid called Sitar Power by Ashwin Batish reintroduced sitar in western nations. Sitar Power drew the attention of a number of record labels and was snapped up by Shanachie Records of New Jersey to head their World Beat Ethno Pop division.

===== Technopop =====
The influence of filmi may be seen in popular music worldwide. Technopop pioneers Haruomi Hosono and Ryuichi Sakamoto of the Yellow Magic Orchestra produced a 1978 electronic album, Cochin Moon, based on an experimental fusion of electronic music and Bollywood-inspired Indian music. Truth Hurts' 2002 song "Addictive", produced by DJ Quik and Dr. Dre, was taken from Lata Mangeshkar's "Thoda Resham Lagta Hai" in Jyoti (1981). The Black Eyed Peas' Grammy Award winning 2005 song "Don't Phunk with My Heart" was inspired by two 1970s Bollywood songs: "Ye Mera Dil Yaar Ka Diwana" from Don (1978) and "Ae Nujawan Hai Sub" from Apradh (1972). Both songs were composed by Kalyanji Anandji, sung by Asha Bhosle, and featured the dancer Helen.

===== Western classical music =====
Some prominent Indians in Western classical music are:

- Andre de Quadros- conductor and music educator,
- Zubin Mehta, conductor
- Mehli Mehta, father of Zubin, violinist and founding conductor of the Bombay Symphony Orchestra
- Anil Srinivasan, pianist
- Ilaiyaraaja, the first Indian to compose a full symphony performed by the Royal Philharmonic Orchestra in London's Walthamstow Town Hall
- Naresh Sohal, British Indian-born composer
- Param Vir, British Indian-born composer
- Beno, Indian-born composer

=== Influence on national music scene ===
Bollywood has been a significant form of soft power for India, increasing its influence and changing overseas perceptions of India. According to author Roopa Swaminathan, "Bollywood cinema is one of the strongest global cultural ambassadors of a new India." Its role in expanding India's global influence is comparable to Hollywood's similar role with American influence.

==== Africa ====
Kishore Kumar is popular in Egypt and Somalia.

Hindi films were originally distributed to some parts of Africa by Lebanese businessmen, and Mother India (1957) continued to be screened in Nigeria decades after its release. Indian movies have influenced Hausa clothing, songs have been covered by Hausa singers, and stories have influenced Nigerian novelists. Stickers of Indian films and stars decorate taxis and buses in Nigeria's Northern Region, and posters of Indian films hang on the walls of tailoring shops and mechanics' garages.

In South Africa, film imports from India were watched by black and Indian audiences. Several Bollywood figures have travelled to Africa for films and off-camera projects. Padmashree Laloo Prasad Yadav (2005) was filmed in South Africa. Dil Jo Bhi Kahey... (2005) was also filmed almost entirely in Mauritius, which has a large ethnic-Indian population.

In Egypt, Bollywood films were popular during the 1970s and 1980s. Amitabh Bachchan has remained popular in the country and Indian tourists visiting Egypt are asked, "Do you know Amitabh Bachchan?"

==== Americas ====
===== Caribbean =====
Indo-Caribbean music of Indo-Caribbean people in Caribbean is most common in Trinidad and Tobago, Guyana, Jamaica, and Suriname, which reflects their Bhojpuri heritage. Main instrumentation are dhantal, metal rod, clapper, dholak, two-headed barrel drum. Women sing Hindu bhajans and folk songs from the music of Bhojpur on various important life events, rituals, celebrations, festivals like phagwah and holi. Indo-Caribbean contributions to popular music are very important. The most well-known is the Indo-Trinidadian chutney music tradition. Chutney is a form of popular dance music that developed in the mid-to late 20th century. Baithak Gana is a similar popular form originating in Suriname.

===== Latin America =====
There is significant Indian diaspora communities in Suriname and Guyana, Indian music and Hindi-language movies are popular. In 2006, Dhoom 2 became the first Bollywood film to be shot in Rio de Janeiro.

===== North America =====
In the new millennium, American hip-hop has featured Indian filmi and bhangra. Mainstream hip-hop artists have sampled songs from Bollywood movies and have collaborated with Indian artists. Examples include Timbaland's "Indian Flute", Erick Sermon and Redman's "React", Slum Village's "Disco", and Truth Hurts' hit song "Addictive", which sampled a Lata Mangeshkar song, and The Black Eyed Peas sampled Asha Bhosle's song "Yeh Mera Dil" in their hit single "Don't Phunk With My Heart". In 1997, the British band Cornershop paid tribute to Asha Bhosle with their song Brimful of Asha, which became an international hit. British-born Indian artist Panjabi MC also had a Bhangra hit in the US with "Mundian To Bach Ke" which featured rapper Jay-Z. Asian Dub Foundation's politically charged rap and punk rock influenced sound has a multi-racial audience in their native UK. In 2008, international star Snoop Dogg appeared in a song in the film Singh Is Kinng. In 2007, hip-hop producer Madlib released Beat Konducta Vol 3–4: Beat Konducta in India; an album which heavily samples and is inspired by the music of India.

==== Asia ====
===== South Asia =====
Due to shared cultural heritage and language, Indian music and Bollywood films are also popular in Afghanistan, Pakistan, Bangladesh, and Nepal, where Hindustani is widely understood.

===== Southeast Asia =====
Already covered in earlier section Ancient influence on Southeast Asian music genre.

===== West Asia =====
West Asia has large Indian diaspora population, who mainly consume Indian music. Indian music is also popular with native middle eastern people. 85% of Qatar's and 75% of UAE's total population are Indian citizens. Hindi films and music have become popular in Arab countries, and imported Indian films are usually subtitled in Arabic when they are released. Bollywood has progressed in Israel since the early 2000s, with channels dedicated to Indian films on cable television;

==== Europe ====
===== Germany =====
In Germany, Indian stereotypes included bullock carts, beggars, sacred cows, corrupt politicians, and catastrophes before Bollywood and the IT industry transformed global perceptions of India.

===== UK =====
In the late 1980s, Indian-British artists fused Indian and Western traditions to make the Asian Underground. Since the 1990s, Canadian born musician Nadaka who has spent most of his life in India, has been creating music that is an acoustic fusion of Indian classical music with western styles. One such singer who has merged the Bhakti sangeet tradition of India with the western non-Indian music is Krishna Das and sells music records of his musical sadhana. Another example is the Indo-Canadian musician Vandana Vishwas who has experimented with western music in her 2013 album Monologues.

In a more recent example of Indian-British fusion, Laura Marling along with Mumford and Sons collaborated in 2010 with the Dharohar Project on a four-song EP. The British band Bombay Bicycle Club also sampled the song "Man Dole Mera Tan Dole" for their single "Feel". Laxmikant-Pyarelal

==== Oceania ====
Due to large Indian diaspora population, Indian music and movies are very popular in Fiji especially among Indo-Fijians.

Australia and New Zealand have 2 percent Indian population, as well as other a large South Asian diaspora, and Bollywood music and movies are popular amongst non-Asians in the country as well.

== Organisations promoting Indian music ==
Sangeet Natak Akademi is the national level academy for performing arts set up by the Government of India in 1952, which bestows Sangeet Natak Akademi Award as the highest official Indian government's recognition given to practicing artists, It has established several institutions including the Manipur Dance Academy in Imphal, Ravindra Rangshala Centers, Sattriya Centre, Kathak Kendra (National Institute of Kathak Dance) at New Delhi, Centre for Kutiyattam at Thiruvananthapuram, Chhau Centre at Baripada in Jamshedpur, Banaras Music Akademi, Varanasi, and the Northeast Centre. Akhil Bharatiya Gandharva Mahavidyalaya Mandal (अखिल भारतीय गान्धर्व महाविद्यालय मंडल) is an institution for the promotion and propagation of Indian classical music and dance.

== See also ==
- Indian classical music
- Indian classical dance
- Indian musical instruments
- Indian Music Industry
- Military Music Wing
- Music of South Asia
- List of regional genres of music
