= Indian folk music =

Music genre

Indian folk music is sung in various languages and dialects. It is the music made by ancient Indians.

Indian folk music is an oral tradition spanning hundreds of regional styles, languages, and rhythms. It marks harvests, weddings, seasons, and spiritual or heroic stories across the country.

== Chawtal ==
Chawtal or Chowtal, aside from being the name of a "taal"/"tala" or meter in Hindustani classical music, is a form of folklore song of North India's Bhojpuri region, sung by its native people during the Phagwa or Holi festival.

== Kajari ==
Kajari is a folk song and dance form from Bhojpuri region of Uttar Pradesh and Bihar. It is one of the Hindustani semi-classical music genre, performed during the rainy season usually late June to September when lush greenery reappears and agricultural labor begins again.

== Tamang Selo ==
Tamang Selo is a musical genre of the Tamang people and widely popular amongst the Nepali speaking community in India and around the world. It is usually accompanied by Tamang instruments, the Damphu, Madal and Tungna. although modern instruments have found their way into the compositions these days A Selo could be very catchy, attractive and lively or slow and melodious and is usually sung to express love, sorrow and stories of day-to-day life. Hira Devi Waiba is hailed as the pioneer of Nepali Folk songs and Tamang Selo. Her song 'Chura ta Hoina Astura' (चुरा त होइन अस्तुरा) is said to be the first Tamang Selo ever recorded. Waiba has sung nearly 300 songs in a career spanning 40 years. After Waiba's death in 2011, her son Satya Aditya Waiba (producer) and Navneet Aditya Waiba (singer) collaborated and re-recorded her most iconic songs and released an album titled Ama Lai Shraddhanjali (आमालाई श्रद्धाञ्जली-Tribute to Mother).

== Bhavageethe ==
Bhavageethe (literally 'emotion poetry') is a form of expressionist poetry and light music. When an emotional poem having excellent poetic components becomes a song, it is known as a "Bhaavageeth". Most of the poetry sung in this genre pertain to subjects like love, nature, and philosophy, and the genre itself is not much different from Ghazals, though Ghazals are bound to a peculiar metre. This genre is quite popular in many parts of India, notably in Karnataka and Maharashtra. Bhavageethe may be called by different names in other languages.

Kannada Bhavageethe draws from the poetry of modern, including Kuvempu, D.R. Bendre, Gopalakrishna Adiga, K.S. Narasimhaswamy, G.S. Shivarudrappa, K. S. Nissar Ahmed, and N S Lakshminarayana Bhatta. Notable Bhavageethe performers include P. Kalinga Rao, Mysore Ananthaswamy, C. Aswath, Shimoga Subbanna, Archana Udupa, and Raju Ananthaswamy.

C. N. Joshi is one of the foremost Bhaavageet singers in Marathi. Gajanan Watave is known for making the Bhaavageet tradition flourish in homes of Maharashtra.

Bhaavageete in Marathi draws from the works of Shanta Shelke, Vinda Karandikar, Jagdish Khebudkar, Ga Di Madgulkar, Raja Badhe and Mangesh Padgaonkar. Bhaavgeete composers include Sudhir Phadke, Shrinivas Khale and Yashwant Dev. Singers include Suresh Wadkar, Arun Date, Suman Kalyanpur, Lata Mangeshkar, Asha Bhosle and Bhimsen Joshi. Many books containing compilations of Bhaavageete in Marathi are available.

== Bhangra and Giddha ==
Bhangra (Punjabi: ਭੰਗੜਾ) is a form of dance-oriented folk music of Punjab. The present musical style is derived from non traditional musical accompaniment to the riffs of Punjab called by the same name. The female dance of Punjab region is known as Giddha (Punjabi: ਗਿੱਧਾ).

== Lavani ==
Lavani is a popular folk form of Maharashtra. Traditionally, the songs are sung by female artists, but male artists may occasionally sing Lavanis. The dance format associated with Lavani is known as Tamasha.This dance format contains the dancer (Tamasha Bai), the helping dancer - Maavshi, The Drummer - Dholki vaala & The Flute Boy - Baasuri Vaala.

== Sufi folk rock ==
Sufi folk rock contains elements of modern hard rock and traditional folk music with Sufi poetry. While it was pioneered by bands like Junoon in Pakistan, it became very popular especially in north India. In 2005, Rabbi Shergill released a Sufi rock song called "Bulla Ki Jaana", which became a chart-topper in India and Pakistan. More recently, the Sufi folk rock song "Bulleya" from the 2016 film Ae Dil Hai Mushkil became a mammoth hit.

== Dandiya ==
Dandiya is a dance-oriented folk music that has also been adapted for pop music worldwide, popular in Western India, especially during Navaratri. The present musical style is derived from the traditional musical accompaniment to the folk dance of Dandiya called by the same name.

== Jhumair and Domkach ==
Jhumair and Domkach are Nagpuri folk music. The musical instruments used in folk music and dance are Dhol, Mandar, Bansi, Nagara, Dhak, Shehnai, Khartal, Narsinga etc.

== Pandavani ==
Pandavani is a folk singing style of musical narration of tales from ancient epic Mahabharata with musical accompaniment and Bhima as hero. This form of folk theatre is popular in the state of Chhattisgarh and in the neighbouring tribal areas of Orissa and Andhra Pradesh.

Rajasthani music has a diverse collection of musician castes, including langas, sapera, bhopa, jogi and Manganiar.

== Bauls ==
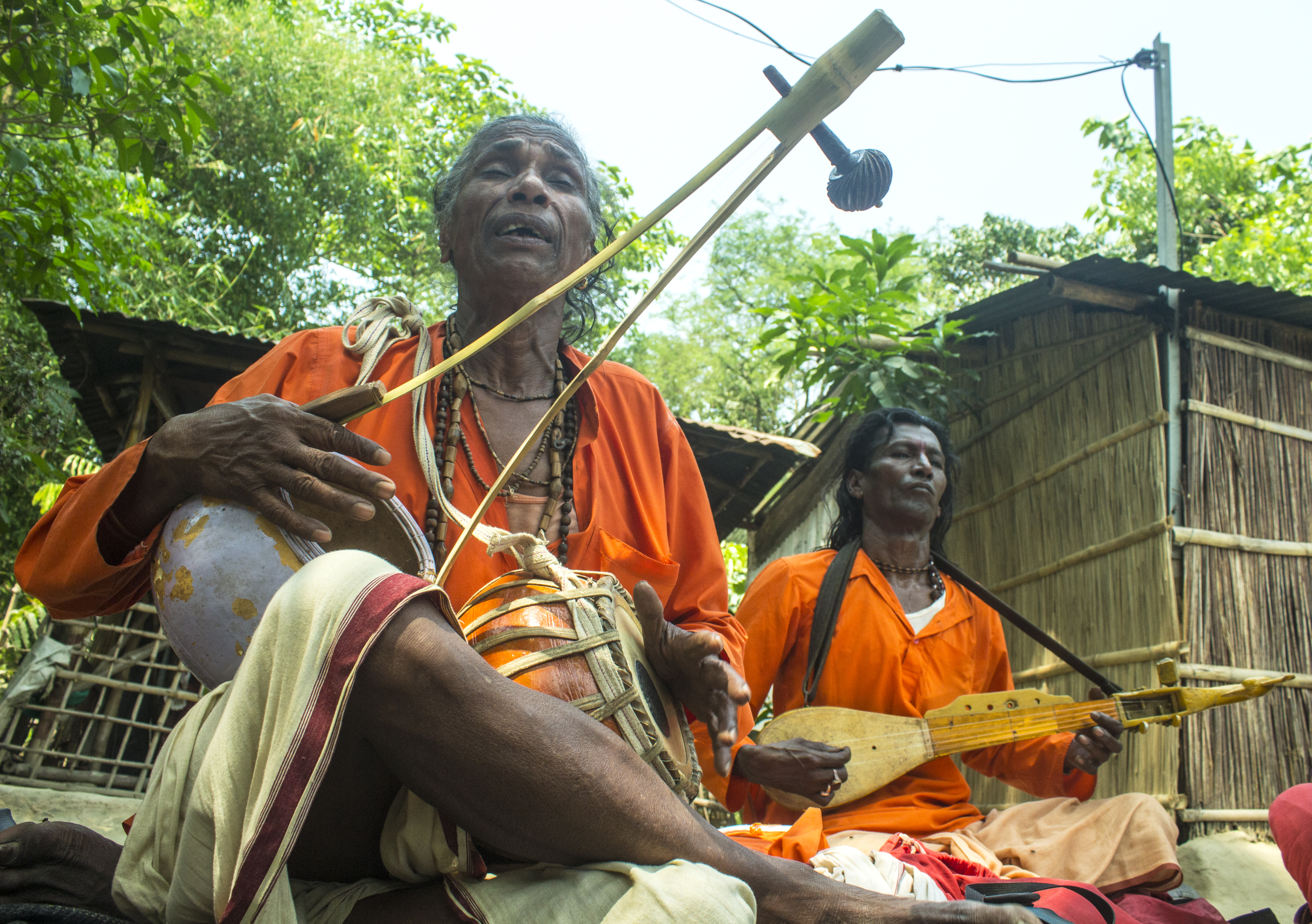
Baul Singer with ektara

The Bauls of Bengal were an order of musicians in 18th, 19th and early 20th century India who played a form of music using a khamak, ektara and dotara. The word Baul comes from Sanskrit batul meaning divinely inspired insanity. They are a group of Hindu mystic minstrels. They are thought to have been influenced greatly by the Hindu tantric sect of the Kartabhajas as well as by Sufi sects. Bauls travel in search of the internal ideal, Maner Manush (Man of the Heart).

== Bhatiali ==
This type of music was cultured mainly by the oarsmen and fishermen of erstwhile Bengal. There are many opinions regarding the origin of the term "Bhatiali". Most popular of them are:

- They use to sing it in the Ebb (Bhata) as in this phase it does not need much effort for rowing.
- It originated from the Bhati area (now in Bangladesh).

One of the most eminent singers is Nirmalendu Chowdhury.

== Bihu ==
Bihu songs are famous among music lovers in Assam and are based on themes like Assamese new year, farmers' daily life, love and more. Bihu music is played with instruments like dhol, mohor singor pepa, cymbal, a bamboo instrument called gogona and a clapper made from bamboo known as toka. The musicians of the state have been following this traditional form of music for generations.

== Garba ==
Garba ("song") is sung in honor of Hindu goddesses and gods during Navratri. They are sung in the honor of goddess Durga's nine different forms and other gods like Krishna, Hanuman, Ram, etc.

== Dollu Kunita ==
This is a group dance that is named after the Dollu — the percussion instrument used in the dance. It is performed by the menfolk of the Kuruba community of the North Karnataka area. The group consists of 16 dancers who wear the drum and beat it to rhythms while dancing. The beat is controlled and directed by a leader with cymbals who is positioned in the center. Slow and fast rhythms alternate and group weaves varied patterns.

== Kolata/Kolattam ==
Kolata/Kolattam is a traditional folk dance of the states of Andhra Pradesh, Karnataka and Tamil Nadu. Similar to its North Indian counterpart Dandiya Ras, it is performed with coloured sticks and usually involves both men and women dancing together.

== Telangana's Janapadha Geyalu ==
Telangana had its own unique song and dance, and there were many folk singers and artistes who took part in the Telangana movement. Some of the prominent names who took active part in the Telangana movement are Gaddar, Belli Lalitha, Sai Chand, Vimalakka and singers like Deshapati Srinivas and Rasamayi Balakishan.

== Uttarakhandi music ==
Example of a traditional song sung by Kumaoni girls in Uttarakhand.

Uttarakhandi folk music had its roots in the lap of nature. The pure and blessed music have the feel and the touch of nature and subjects related to nature. The folk music primarily is related to the festivals, religious traditions, folk stories and simple life of the people of Uttarakhand. Thus the songs of Uttarakhand are a true reflection of the cultural heritage and the way people live their lives in the Himalayas. Musical instruments used in Uttarakhand music include the dhol, damoun, turri, ransingha, dholki, daur, thali, bhankora and masak baja. Tabla and harmonium are also used but to a lesser extent. The main languages are Kumaoni and Garhwali.

== Veeragase ==
Veeragase is a dance folk form prevalent in the state of Karnataka. It is a vigorous dance based on Hindu mythology and involves very intense energy-sapping dance movements. Veeragase is one of the dances demonstrated in the Dasara procession held in Mysore.

== Naatupura Paatu ==
Naatupura Paatu is Tamil folk music. It is divided into gramathisai (village folk music) and gana (city folk music).

== Preservation of Folk Music ==
While there are clear records exhibiting early forms of music theory, notation, and systems within India, many of the forms of folk music, specifically, are on the verge of extinction. Many organizations have been established to help preserve these forms and advance the understanding of folk music history in India. Anahad Foundation is one such organization dedicated to archiving of these art forms overtime and through history.

== Distribution ==
- Andaman and Nicobar Islands: Dugger, Khadaw, and Kalapani Phaag
- Andhra Pradesh: Madiga Dappu, Burra Katha, Jangam Katha, and Mala Jamidika
- Arunachal Pradesh: Ja-Jin-Ja, Baryi, Nyioga, and Aji Lhamu
- Assam: Bihu Geet, Tokari Geet, Kamrupi Lokgeet, Goalparia Lokogeet, and Borgeet
- Bihar: Sohar, Samdaun, Kajari, Biraha, Chaiti, and Nachari
- Chhattisgarh: Pandavani and Dadariya
- Goa: Mando, Dulpod, Oviyo, and Dekhni
- Gujarat: Garba, Doha, Sanedo, Chhand, Sugam Sangeet, Dayro, Fattanna, Bhavai, Maniaro, Tippani, and Hudo
- Haryana: Ragini, Saang, Kissa, Teej, Phagan, Suhag, Ghori, and Bhaat
- Himachal Pradesh: Laman, Jhanjhar, Jhuri, and Chamba
- Jammu and Kashmir: Chakri, Wanwun, Ladishah, Bhakha, Karak, Geetru, and Henzae
- Jharkhand: Jhumair and Domkach
- Karnataka: Bhavageete, Yakshagana, Dollu Kunitha, Veeragase, and Kamsale
- Kerala: Vadakkan Pattukal and Vanchipattu
- Ladakh: Lharna, Jabro, Shondol, Gying Lu, Chang Lu, Kathok Chenmo, Nyopa / Tho Lu, and Koshan
- Madhya Pradesh: Alha Gayan, Kalgi Turra, Sanja Geet, and Vasudeva Gayan
- Maharashtra: Bhavageete, Lavani, Powada, Bhajan, Pravachan, Bhakteegeete, Natya Sangeet, Bharud, Gondhal, Lalita, Abhang, and Tumbadi
- Manipur: Sankirtan, Sana Lamok, Pena Music, Khubak Ishei, and Lai Haraoba
- Meghalaya: Wangala, Shad Suk Mynsiem, Laho, and Behdienkhlam
- Mizoram: Bawh Hla, Hlado, and Puipun Hla
- Nagaland: Hereileu, Heliamleu, Neuleu, and Hekaileu
- Odisha: Sambalpuri, Daskathia, Pala, and Lalita
- Puducherry (union territory): Garadi, Villu Paattu, and Amba
- Punjab: Mahiyan, Boliyan, Tappe, Jugni, Gurmat Sangeet, Suhag, Ghorian, Sithniyan, and Dulla Bhatti
- Rajasthan: Maand, Manganiyar, Langa, Talbandi, Kurja, Bhopa-Bhopi, Panihari, Hichki, Gorbandh, Moomal, and Suvatiya
- Sikkim: Tamang Selo, Chu-Faat, Gha To Kito, and Palam
- Tamil Nadu: Naattupura Padalgal, Villuppaatu, Oppari, and Talattu
- Telangana: Janapadha Geyalu, Oggu Katha, and Bathukamma Paatalu
- Tripura: Garia, Hojagiri, Lebang, and Mamita
- Uttarakhand: Jagar, Khuded, Mangal Geet, Bajuband, Thadya, Panwara, Jhora, Chhopati, Chhura, and Chanchari
- Uttar Pradesh: Biraha, Kajari, Chaiti, Rasiya, Phaag, Aalha (Bundelkhand region), Sohar, Nakta, Qawwali, Ghazal, Dhola, and Ragini
- West Bengal: Tamang Selo, Baul, Bhawaiya, Bhatiyali, and Kirtan
