= Music of Sikkim =

Overview of music traditions in Sikkim, India

Music of Sikkim ranges from traditional Nepali folk music to Westernized pop music. The ethnic communities, Lepcha, Limbu, Bhutia, Kiratis and Nepalis constitute the music which is an ingrained part of Sikkimese culture.

The main traditional style is the Indian folk music known as Tamang Selo, This music of the Tamang community is performed to the rhythmic sound of “Dhamphu”, a musical instrument. Western-style pop is popular in the region of Assam and Sikkim, as well as western-style foreign music styles.

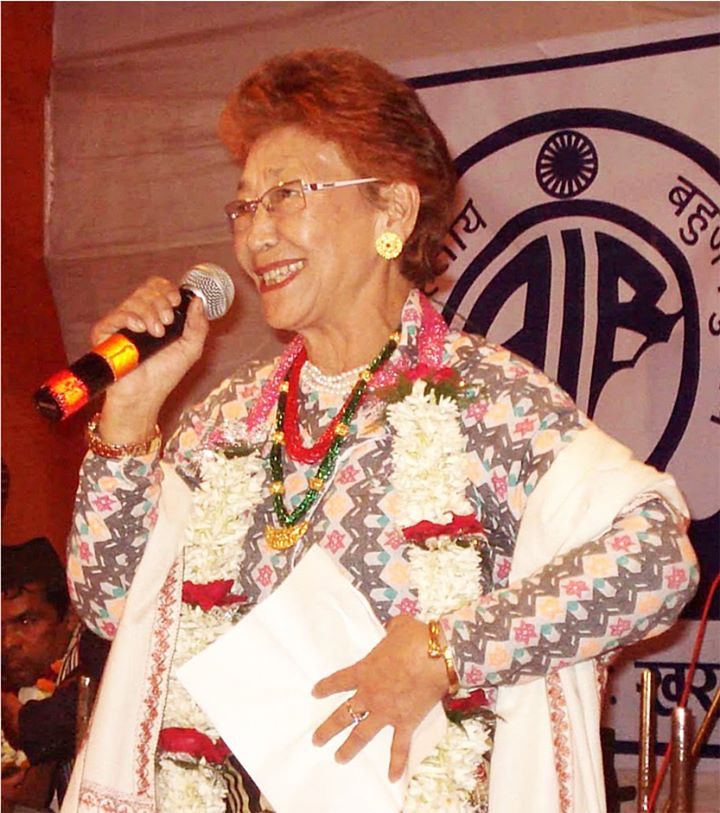
Hira Devi Waiba, pioneer of indian folk songs in India

== Tamang Selo ==
This is a musical genre of the Tamang people and popular amongst the Nepali speaking community in West Bengal and Sikkim in India and around the world. It is accompanied by Tamang instruments, the Madal, Damphu and Tungna, although nowadays musicians have taken to modern instruments. A Tamang Selo can be catchy and lively or slow and melodious and is usually sung to convey sorrow, love, happiness or day-to-day incidents and stories of folklore.

== Western influence ==
Sikkim along with other northeastern states is a centre for western-style music in India. Tribal Rain, a highly popular Nepali acoustic experimental band is from the Sikkimese town Namchi.

Hip-hop, K-pop and Rap music is most popular among teenagers and the youths of Sikkim.
