= Dream Note (Indian band) =

Indian indie pop band

- Origin: Jaipur, Rajasthan, India
- Genres: Pop; Ambient; Indie Rock
- Years active: 2014–present
- Members: Gaurav Tiwari; Taresh Agarwal
- Website: https://dreamnoteofficial.com/

Dream Note is an indie-pop duo based in Jaipur, India and formed in 2014. Founded by singer-songwriter Gaurav Tiwari, the duo also consists of Producer and Guitarist Taresh Agarwal. Their music displays ambient and dreamy pop, folk and rock influences. Since its inception, the band has released 2 EPs, 1 mini-album and more than 10 singles.

== History and career ==
Formed by musicians hailing from Jaipur, Rajasthan, Dream Note first started by creating their own versions of Bollywood classics like "Chand Si Mehbooba" (1965) by Mukesh and "Humein Tumse Pyar" (1981) by Kishore Kumar. The duo released its first original single, a pop number, "Tere Janey Ke Baad" in 2017.

The duo got popular for their hit single "Waqt Ki Baatein" which they released in 2018, which got viral during the Covid Pandemic.

The duo released their debut EP, an indie-pop and indie-folk record, Girgit Damroo And The Good Trip, in 2020. It consists of five tracks. Following the release, the group's production was momentarily interrupted when guitarist-producer Taresh Agarwal suffered a major accident. Then, they started working on their second EP, Dhun, in December 2021. The five-track acoustic, ukulele-based record was released on May 5, 2022

Following the release of their second EP, Dhun, Dream Note embarked on their first, six-city tour called 'The Dream Tour' on May 11, 2022. They covered the cities of Mumbai, Pune, Bangalore, New Delhi, Chandigarh and concluded the tour in their hometown of Jaipur on May 28, 2022.

The duo released their first mini-album, Jaadugari on October 30, 2025. The viral track Pyaar Kaafi Nahi was a part of this mini-album. The duo also went on their biggest tour of 14 cities as an album launch tour.

Dream Note also was featured on Spotify's emerging artist program, RADAR India.

== Members ==
- Gaurav Tiwari – Singer, Songwriter
- Taresh Agarwal – Producer, Guitars, Keyboards

== Discography ==
Singles
No.	Title	Length
1.	"Tere Janey Ke Baad"	3:54
2.	"Waqt Ki Baatein"	4:03
3.	"Na Kehna Tum"	4:25
4.	"Khidkiyan"	4:06
5.	"Kaisi Ye Jagah Hai"	4:10
6.	"Zindagi Ki Goud Mein"	3:36
7.	"Kahaani 2.0"	3:02
8.	"Milan"	4:03
9.	"KHU"	3:54
10.	"Tere Janey Ke Baad (Revisit)"	3:00
11.	"Kahan Woh Din Gaye (Revisit)"	3:46
12.	"Zindagi Ki Goud Mein (Revisit)"	3:28
13.	"Kinaare"	3:08
14.	"Jaana"	3:36

Girgit Damroo And The Good Trip (EP)
No.	Title	Length
1.	"Mehfuz"	5:10
2.	"Hata Diye"	4:10
3.	"Sapno Ka Mol"	4:51
4.	"Kya Karenge?"	4:48
5.	"Kahan Woh Din Gaye"	4:00

Dhun (EP)
No.	Title	Length
1.	"Dil"	3:07
2.	"Kahaani"	3:08
3.	"Khoyi Hui Dhun"	2:35
4.	"Zaroori Nahi"	2:19
5.	"Zeher"	3:20

Jaadugari
No.	Title	Length
1.	"Sehar"	03:36
2.	"Sab Sahi"	03:24
3.	"Pyaar Kaafi Nahi"	02:55
4.	"Kaun Poochega?"	03:33
5.	"Tu Dekhe Kya"	03:35
