= Calcutta Symphony Orchestra =

Indian orchestra

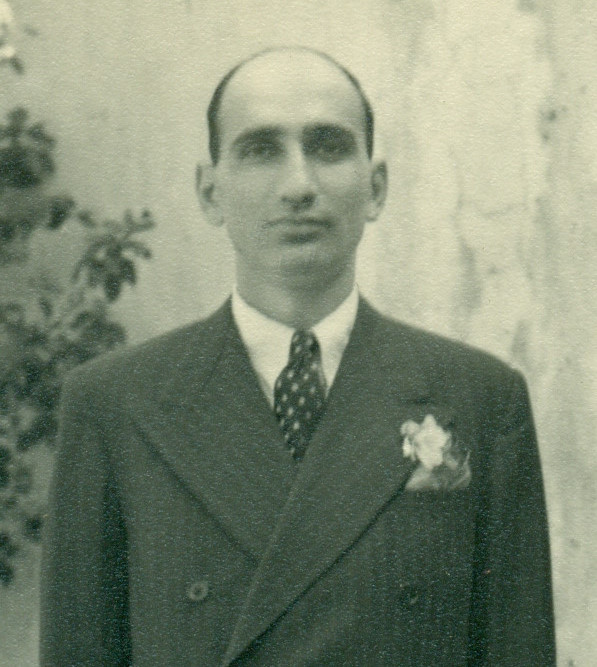
Bernard "Bunny" Jacob, the last conductor of the Calcutta Symphony Orchestra.

The Calcutta Symphony Orchestra is an orchestra that once existed in Calcutta, India. The last conductor of the orchestra was Bunny Jacob.

Francisco Casanovas also once conducted the orchestra and Yehudi Menuhin performed with it in 1952.

== See also ==
- Calcutta School of Music
- Calcutta Chamber Orchestra
