= Bunny Jacob =

Conductor and businessman

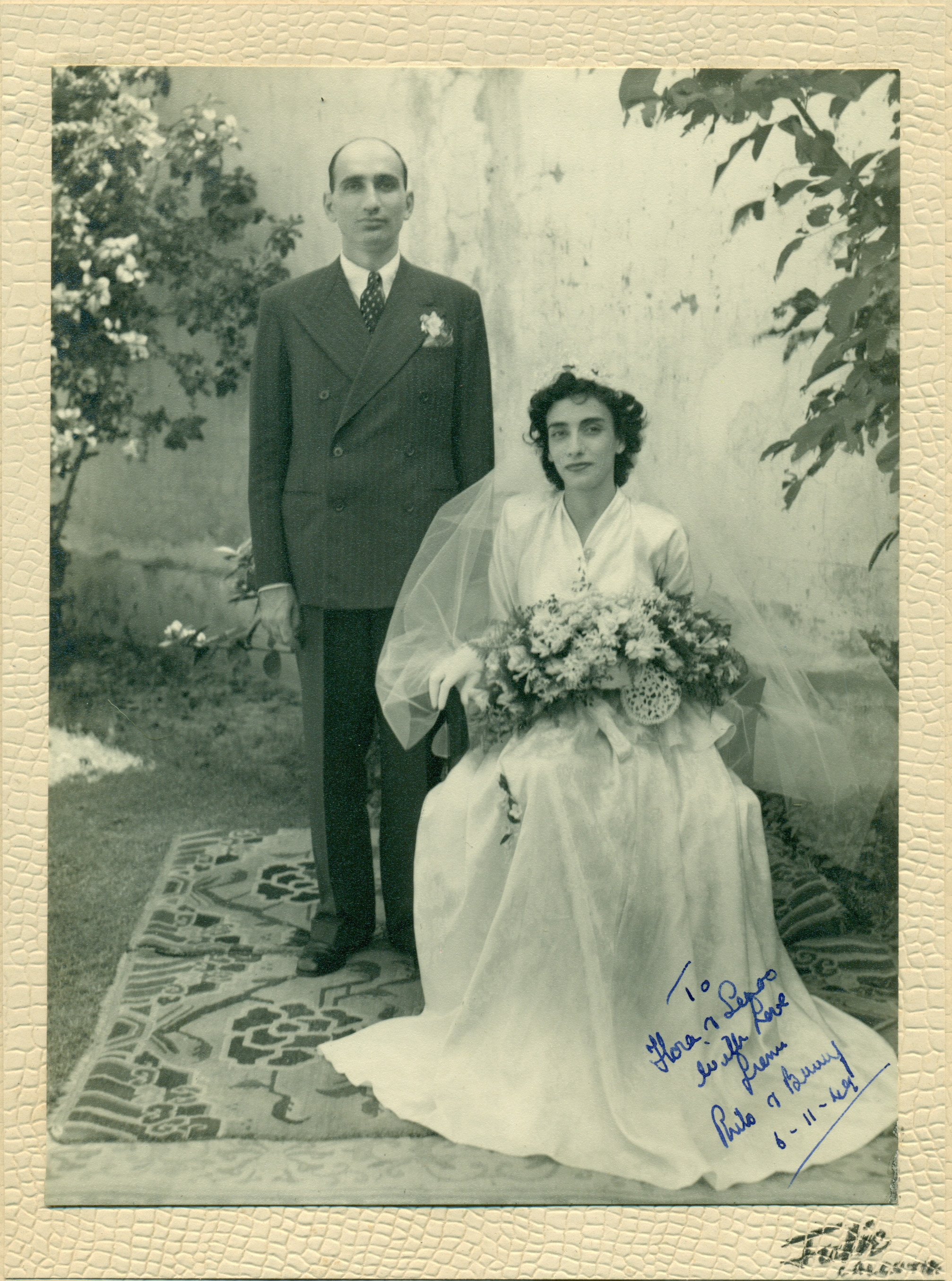
Bernard and Philomena Jacob

Bernard "Bunny" Jacob was a Jewish businessman in Calcutta who was a director of the B.N. Elias and Company trading conglomerate and the last conductor of the Calcutta Symphony Orchestra.

== Family ==
Jacob was the son of J.R. Jacob and Lily Elias. He had a brother Ronnie. He married his first cousin, Philomena "Philo" Gubbay, around 1949.

== Career ==
Jacob was a director of the B.N. Elias and Company trading conglomerate. The firm traded in jute and tobacco, and owned real estate.

== Music ==
Jacob and Ronnie studied music with Phillipé Sandré and Jacob took a keen interest in the Calcutta School of Music. He was the last conductor of the now defunct Calcutta Symphony Orchestra. Later, he was active in music in England.

== See also ==
- History of the Jews in Kolkata
