= Garadi =

Folk dance from Puducherry

Garadi is a popular folk dance of Puducherry.

The dance has a mythological origin and it is performed during all festivals in the region. It lasts for five to eight hours.
