= Calcutta Chamber Orchestra =

Indian chamber orchestra

- Short name: CCO
- Former name: Calcutta Foundation Orchestra
- Founded: 2005
- Location: Kolkata, India
- Principal conductor: Subhashish Debnath
- Website: calmusic.org/cco.aspx at the Calcutta School of Music

The Calcutta Chamber Orchestra (CCO) is a chamber orchestra based in Kolkata, India. It was formerly named the Calcutta Foundation Orchestra and assumed its present name after being taken over by the Calcutta School of Music.

The orchestra came to have its current set up in 2005.
