= Marga Sangeet =

Use of music to find enlightenment

Marga Sangeet is the use of music to find path to moksha. Though some articles equate it to Indian Classical Music, Pandit Mukul Shivputra mentions it as "the path to salvation" in this interview titled 'The Raga of Truth'.

== Etymology ==
The Sanskrit root word of Marga is mrg, "which indicates contemplation and seeking." The article also mentions "That which was discovered by Brahma and (first) practiced by Bharata and others in the audience of lord Shiva is known as marga, which definitely bestows prosperity; while the sangeeta comprising gitam, vadyam and nrttam, that entertains people according to their taste in the different regions, is known as desi"

== Connection between Marga Sangeet and Samagana ==
Samagana mentions

- Gramgeyo-gān: Sung in villages or towns.
- Aranyageya-gān: Practiced in solitude of forest. Also called Rahasyageyo-gān.
- Ooh-gān: Pragath-s specially created for yajna on basis of Gramgeyo-gān.
- Oohya-gān ऊह्यगान: Pragath-s created for yajna on basis of Rahasyageyo-gān.

The connection between Marga Sangeet and Rahasyageyo-gān is one of Swara-sadhana

== Articles on Marga Sangeet ==
- ITC Sangeet Research Academy on Marga Sangeet
- Marga Sangeet article title 'Sangeet Marga - Path to Moksha' in Times of India
- 'Birth of Music in India' refers to Marga Sangeet
- Reference to Marga Sangeet in relation to Rishis
- Sam Notes

== See also ==
- Samagana
- Nada Yoga
- Laya Yoga
- Mantra
- Swara Yoga
- Swara
- Moksha
