= Vandana Vishwas =

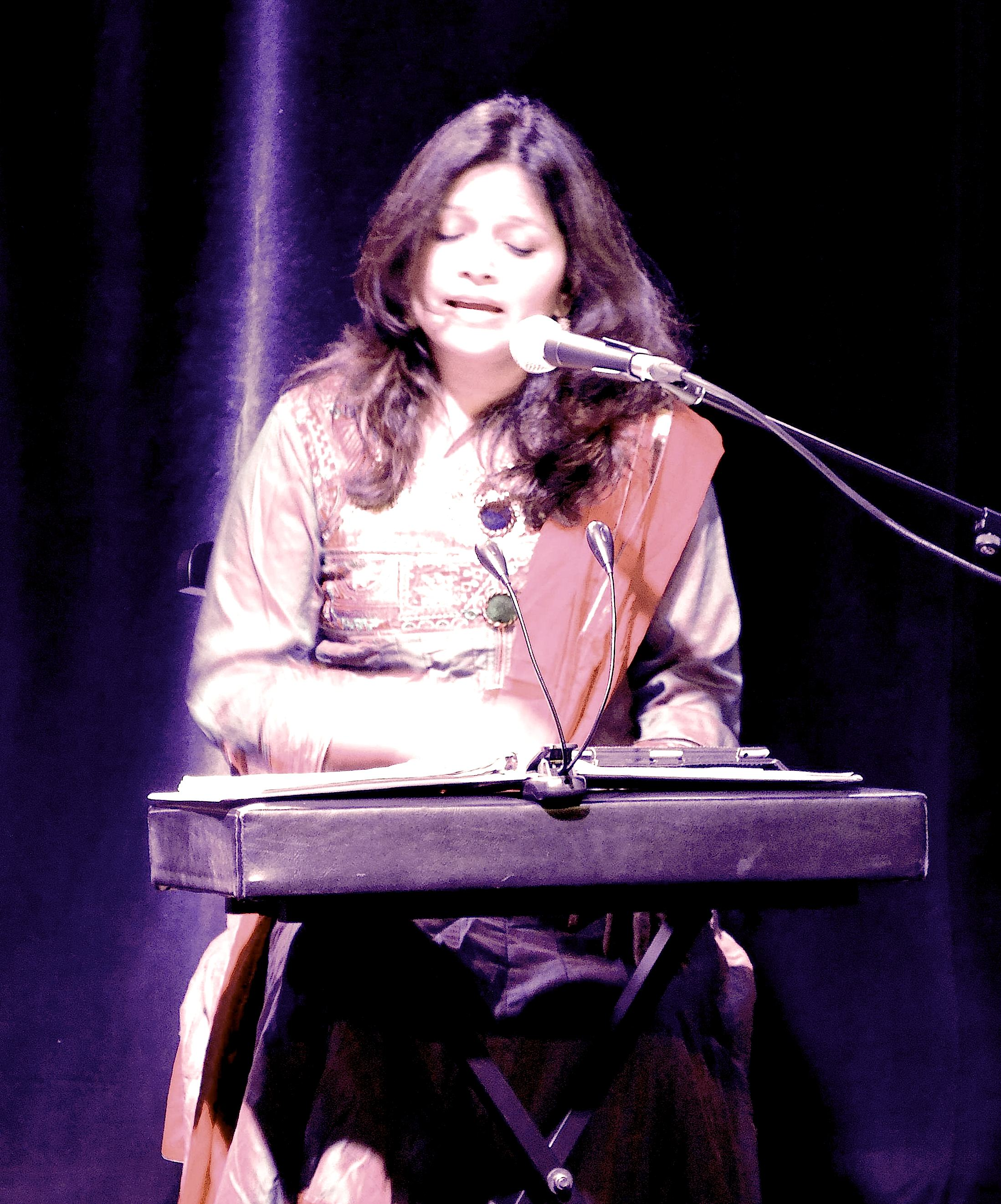
- Vandana Vishwas Performing at Small World Music Centre, Toronto, ON, Canada

Background information
- Born: 17 July 1970 (age 56); Lucknow, India
- Origin: Mississauga, Ontario, Canada
- Genres: Ghazal, Bhajan, Geet, Thumri
- Occupations: Singer, composer, Arranger, Producer
- Years active: 2009–present
- Website: www.vandanavishwas.com

Vandana Vishwas (born 17 July 1970) is a Canadian singer, musician, and composer and architect. She performs North Indian classical music based expressive song forms such as Ghazals, Bhajans, Geet and Thumri. She is a resident of Mississauga, Ontario, Canada.

== Career ==
Vandana released her debut music album 'Meera – The Lover...' in 2009. It is a musical story of the sixteenth century Indian poet Meera Bai. In January 2013, she released her second music album 'Monologues', which is a collection of contemporary Ghazals, Nazms and light Thumris. Her 2014 single, 'Samarsiddha' is the theme track for identically titled Hindi novel authored by a UK based novelist Sandeep Nayyar, which was released in July 2014. Vandana released her third music album 'Parallels' in 2016 which topped RMR charts for 4 weeks consecutively. It is a collaboration of south Asian music with several western and ethnic music genres such as Flamenco, African, Rock, Country, Ballad, New Age. In 2021, Vandana released her second single 'Nav Varsh Mangalkamna Geet' - a Hindi song celebrating new year in India. and another single 'Mann Lago', which was part of her fourth album 'Kabeera - The Thinker...', released later in 2023. The album is based on works of 15th century Indian poet Kabir Das.

== Discography ==
Title	Release	Record label
Meera – The Lover... (Album)	2009	Self Produced
Monologues (Album)	2013	Self Produced
Samarsiddha (Single)	2014	Self Produced
Parallels (Album)	2016	Self Produced
Mann Lago (Single)	2021	Self-Produced
Nav Varsh Mangalkamna Geet (Single)	2021	Self-Produced
Kabeera - The Thinker... (Album)	2023	Self-Produced

== Awards ==
- Silver medal at Global Music Awards 2016 in World Music and Female vocalist categories
- Toronto Independent Music Awards 2016 in World Music category
- Woman Hero Award 2015 by Indo Canadian Arts & Culture Initiative
- Vox-Pop Winner for World Traditional Song at 10th IMA Independent Music Awards
- Best Toronto World CD Album Winner at Toronto Exclusive Magazine awards 2010
- Established Performing Arts at Mississauga Arts Council's Marty Awards 2012

== Honourable mentions ==
- 17th International Billboard Song Contest 2010
- Esongwriter.com song Contest]
- 2010 Marty Award for Established Performing Arts by Mississauga Arts council, Ontario, Canada

== Nominations ==
- TIMA Toronto Independent Music Awards 2010, 2014 & 2015 – Best World Music
- World Artist of the Year at The Indies, the Independent Music Awards 2010
- K.M. Hunter artist Award for Music 2010 by Ontario Arts Council, Canada
- 2010 & 2011 Marty Award for Established Performing Arts by Mississauga Arts council, Ontario, Canada
- 7th TIMA Toronto Independent Music Awards 2014 – Best World Music
