= Hira Devi Waiba =

Nepalese singer (1940-2011)

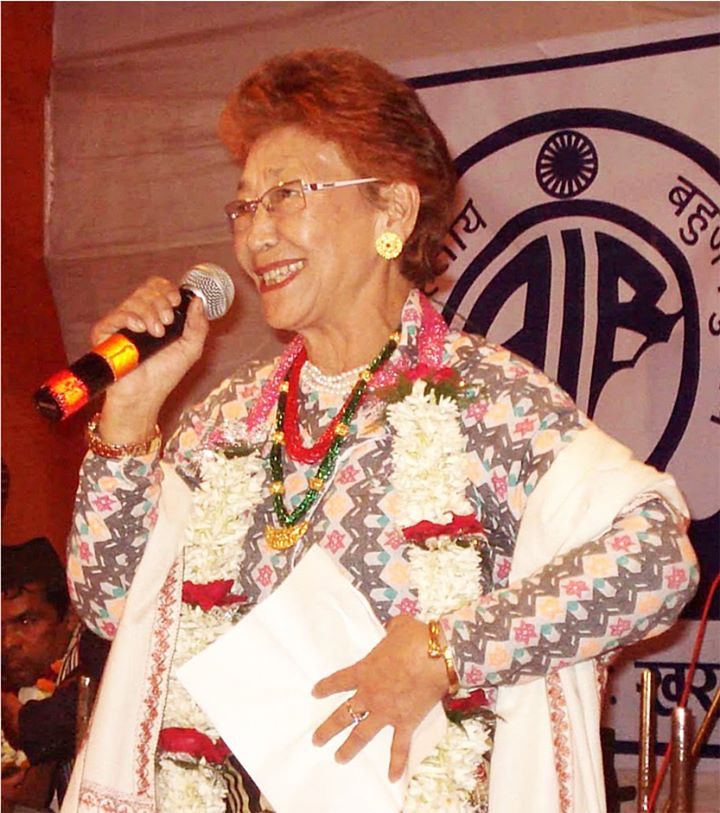
- Waiba in 2010
- Born: 9 September 1940; Ambootia, Bengal Presidency, British India (West Bengal, India)
- Died: 19 January 2011 (aged 70); Kadamtala, Darjeeling district, West Bengal, India
- Other name: Lok Geet Samragi (Queen of Nepali Folk Songs)
- Education: Government College, Darjeeling (B.A College); Shree Ramakrishna B T College, Darjeeling (Bachelor in Teaching)
- Occupations: Singer; Musician; Writer
- Years active: 1974–2011
- Known for: Pioneer of Nepali folk songs and music
- Spouse: Ratal Lal Aditya
- Children: 2, including Navneet Aditya Waiba
- Musical career
- Genres: Tamang Selo, Nepali Folk
- Instruments: Madal, harmonium, damphu: Vocal
- Labels: His Master's Voice; All India Radio (AIR); Radio Nepal; British Broadcasting Corporation (BBC)

Hira Devi Waiba (9 September 1940 – 19 January 2011) was an Indian folk singer in the Nepali-language and is hailed as the pioneer of Nepali folk songs.

Her song "Chura ta Hoina Astura" is said to be the first Tamang Selo (a genre of Nepali folk music) ever recorded. Hira Devi Waiba is the only Nepali folk singer to have cut albums (in 1974 and 1978) with His Master's Voice. She was the sole Grade A Nepali Folk Singer with All India Radio. She was also the first musical artist that Music Nepal, a leading music house in Nepal recorded and released an album of. Before that Music Nepal only released compilation and remastered songs

== Life and music ==
Hira Devi Waiba came from a family of musicians from Ambootia Tea Estate near Kurseong in West Bengal and was one in the line of a long generation of Nepali folk singers and musicians. She was born to parents Singh Man Singh Waiba (father) and Tshering Dolma (mother). She has sung nearly 300 folk songs during her musical career spanning 40 years. Her singing career began when she recorded three songs in Kurseong for Radio Nepal in 1966. She worked as an announcer at the All India Radio station in Kurseong from 1963 to 1965.

Waiba's popular songs include Phariya Lyaaidiyechan, Ora Daudi Jaanda and Ramri tah Ramri. As a tribute to her father, Waiba had opened the SM Waiba International Music and Dance Academy at her home in Kadamtala, near Siliguri in 2008.

== Death ==
Hira Waiba died on 19 January 2011 at the age of 71 years after suffering burn injuries in a fire accident at her home. She is survived by two children Navneet Aditya Waiba and Satya Aditya Waiba both of whom are musicians.

== Daughter and son tribute ==
As a tribute to the Legend Hira Devi Waiba, her children Satya Aditya and Navneet Aditya Waiba re-recorded and released some of her hit singles in 2016–2017. Navneet sang and Satya produced and managed the project 'Ama Lai Shraddhanjali -Tribute to Mother', hence moving the family legacy further.

== Awards ==
Hira Devi was awarded the Mitrasen Purashkar by the Nepali Akademi of Darjeeling in 1986, the Mitrasen Smriti Puraskar by the Sikkim government in 1996, Bhanu Academy Puraskar, the Agam Singh Giri Puraskar in 2001 and the Gorkha Saheed Sewa Samiti's Lifetime Achievement Award. The Nepal government had awarded her the Gorkha Dakshina Bahu (Knighthood of Nepal), Sadhana Samman and the Madhurima Phul Kumari Mahato Award.

== See also ==
- Navneet Aditya Waiba
- Ama Lai Shradhanjali
- Nepali music
- Tamang Selo
