= Ama Lai Shraddhanjali =

Folk music album by Navneet Aditya Waiba

Ama Lai Shraddhanjali - Tribute to Mother

Studio album by Navneet Aditya Waiba
- Released: 3 November 2017
- Recorded: 2016–2017
- Studio: Joon Records - Kathmandu
- Genre: Nepali folk
- Length: 23:30
- Language: Nepali
- Label: OKListen Media
- Producer: Satya Aditya Waiba

Nepali Lok Geet

Ama Lai Shraddhanjali (Nepali: आमालाई श्रद्धाञ्जली. English translation: Tribute to Mother) is a Nepali folk music album by Navneet Aditya Waiba and Satya Waiba, released on 3 November 2017 in Patan Museum, Kathmandu, Nepal. It was released by OKListen. The album is a tribute to Legendary Nepali folk singer the late Hira Devi Waiba, Navneet and Satya's mother.

The music arrangement for the album was done by Rubin Kumar Shesthra of Kutumba. It received good reviews for her "gentle [and] powerful" voice.

== Background ==
After Hira Devi Waiba's death in 2011, the brother and sister duo tasked themselves to re-arranging and recording her songs and in 2015 they handpicked seven of her most iconic and popular songs for this album. The recording process took two years to complete.

== Track listing ==
Ama Lai Shraddhanjali – (CD, digital download, online radio)
No.	Title	Length
1.	"Aye Syangbo"	4:23
2.	"Chuiya ma Hah"	4:12
3.	"Dhankuta"	4:07
4.	"Ramri ta Ramri"	3:27
5.	"Jhilke Naachayko"	4:23
6.	"Phariya Lyaaidiyechan"	4:35
7.	"Kahu Bela"	1:23
Total length:		23:30

== See also ==
- Navneet Aditya Waiba
- Music of Nepal
