= Calcutta School of Music =

Music school in Kolkata, India

The Calcutta School of Music
- Other name: CSM
- Motto in English: Teaching of music and nurturing talent.
- Type: Music
- Established: 1915; 111 years ago
- President: Jyotishka Dasgupta
- Principal: Chaitali Ganguly
- Academic staff: 64
- Administrative staff: 25+
- Students: 1000+
- Location: Kolkata, West Bengal, India; 22.5320°N 88.3612°E
- Campus: Urban
- Website: www.calmusic.org

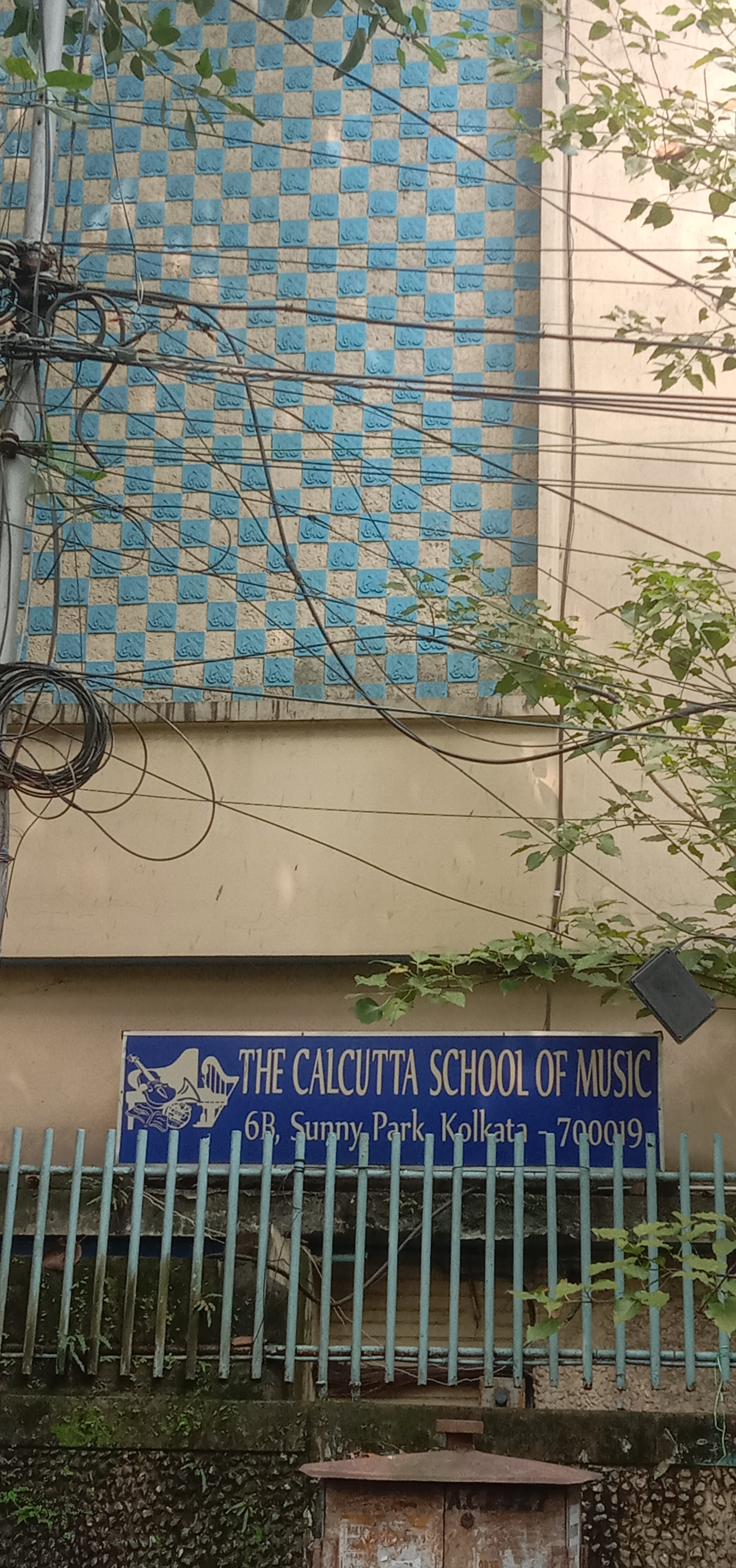
The Calcutta School of Music

The Calcutta School of Music established in 1915 by Phillipe Sandre is an institution in India, in the field of Western Classical music and Contemporary classical music. It was established in the year 1915 by Phillipé Sandré, a musician of considerable calibre, and a contemporary and friend of the famous composer Saint-Saëns. It has a wide-ranging canvas of musical disciplines covering both Indian and Western music, dance, speech training, elocution, and drama. The School provides liberal instruction in musical subjects on one hand, and also arranging orchestral, chamber and solo music training and concerts, as well as music appreciation sessions throughout the year. Many visiting luminaries of the musical world have visited the School throughout its existence. this include maestros Yehudi Menuhin, Isaac Stern and Mstislav Rostropovich. The great sitar maestro Pandit Ravi Shankar inaugurated the faculty of Indian Music & Dance during the year 1975.

== Location ==
The School was originally located at Wellesley Street in Central Calcutta. In the year 1972, the school moved into its own premises at Sunny Park. Its 90th anniversary is being celebrated in 2005–06. The school operates as a non-profit organization, and is managed by the principal under the guidance of the Governing Committee. His Excellency the Governor of West Bengal is a patron of the school

== Faculty ==
Piano

- Mr. Kaushik Das
- Ms. Mousoomi Nandi
- Ms. Chaitali Ganguly
- Mr. Tapan Hazra
- Mr. Avijit Kundu
- Ms. Arpita Chatterjee
- Mr. Arup R. Mitra
- Mr. Ritayan Biswas
- Ms. Sandhya R. Varma
- Mr. Biswajit Samaddar
- Mr. Alistair M. Quadra
- Mr. Pallab Pramanick
- Ms. Sanghamitra Mukherjee
- Mr. Amitava Chatterjee
- Mr. Savio Menezes

Violin

- Mr. Subhashis Dey
- Mr. Sandip Halder
- Mr. Pallab Pramanick
- Mr. Tilak Chatterjee
- Mr. Joseph Rozario
- Mr. Alistair M. Quadra

Electronic Keyboard

- Mr. Alistair M. Quadra
- Mr. Savio Menezes
- Mr. Tapan Hazra
- Mr. Amitava Chatterjee
- Mr. Kaushik Das
- Mr. Sanjib Kumar Das
- Mr. Sankhadip Sengupta
- Mr. Biswajit Samaddar
- Mr. Attreyo Bhattacharya
- Ms. Srobona Chakraborty

Saxophone, Flute and Recorder

- Mr. Anup Chatterjee

Kodaly Junior Music Classes

- Ms. Chaitali Ganguly

Pre Ballet, Modern Contemporary Dance and Salsa

- Mr. Sudipta Kundu (Peddro)

Senior and Junior Choir

- Ms. Chaitali Ganguly

Western Contemporary Vocals

- Mr. Amitava Chatterjee

Communication Skills

- Ms. Debjani Gupta

Speech and Drama

- Ms. Shuktara Lal
- Ms. Katy Lai Roy
- Ms. Debjani Gupta

Drum Kit

- Mr. Darren Manuel
- Mr. Premjit Dutta
- Mr. Dipayan Chakraborty

Viola

- Mr. Joseph Rozario

Cello

- Mr. Suraj K. Dolui

Guitar

- Non Classical (including Bass Guitar)
- Classical
  - Mr. Cyrus J. Tata
  - Ms. Sraddha Sanghvi
  - Mr. Soumitra Chatterjee
  - Mr. Shyamal K. De Mr. Gokul Podder
  - Ms. Sohini De Mr. Debasish Sanyal
  - Mr. Rajib Ranjit

Indian Music and Performing Arts Section: Classical Vocal:

- Mr. Nabhodeep Chakraborty

== See also ==
- Calcutta Chamber Orchestra
- Calcutta Symphony Orchestra

== The Calcutta Chamber Orchestra ==
The Calcutta School of Music financially supports a full time orchestra, the Calcutta Chamber Orchestra (CCO), made up of a full fledged string ensemble of professional musicians. The school pays each musician a stipend for each practice session and an honorarium for concert performances. The school tries to organise trainers from overseas to further the skills of these musicians. Conductors have come and stayed for medium term to work with the orchestra on a chosen repertoire culminating in a concert.

The CCO has been performing several times a year at prestigious events and for eminent personalities and foreign dignitaries. It has played for a documentary film for the famous film director Mr. Gautam Ghosh. The Orchestra has recorded a CD with SaReGaMa, sponsored by M Junction, which was released by H.E. The Governor of West Bengal, Shri M.K. Narayanan, on 1 December 2010. The members of the CCO have played in operas like Fakir of Benaras, The Pearl Fishers and La Traviata, produced by the Neemrana Foundation. Members of the CCO have joined in and performed with orchestras in many other cities of India. Selected members of the CCO regularly perform at the lounges of ITC Sonar, Taj Bengal and Park Plaza.
