= Damphu drum =

Nepalese frame drum

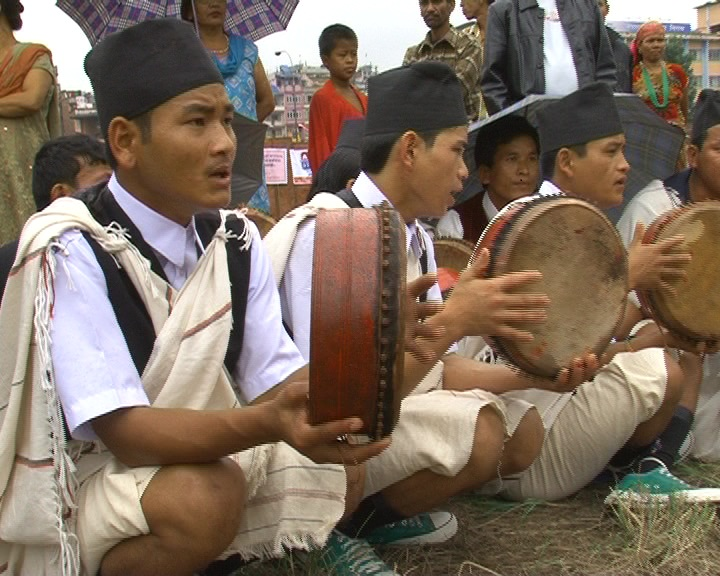
Nepali people playing Damphu

A damphu, or damfoo (Nepali: डम्फु), is a percussion instrument similar to a large tambourine. This instrument is used by the Tamang people of Nepal to play the melodious Tamang Selo. According to folklore Damphu was invented by Peng Dorje, a Tamang King and named it after Nepal's national bird the Daphne bird. It is also played by the Gurung and Magar people of nepal.

The Damphu and Tungna are the main instrument of the Tamang people and Gurung people. these two instruments are said to be the 'nail and flesh' on a finger.

== History ==
Many stories exist in the Tamang community about how the drum was first made and became an accompaniment to Tamang songs. It is said Peng Dorje once killed a particularly beautiful deer which deeply saddened his wife and was in tears so and Peng Dorje decided to cheer her up. He created the drum using the deer beautiful skin. First, he bought a strip of wood and made a circle. Then he tightened the dried deerskin on one side of the circle, using 32 bamboo sticks called phurba. The circle created melodious sounds, trak dhin. He started to sing, remembering his ancestors and gods with the beat of that new-born instrument. The story goes that all creatures danced to it, as did his wife. A bird, the pheasant "Damphu", was also dancing to the melody. So Peng Dorje named the circle drum, "Damphu". It then became a part of the Tamang people's culture and lifestyle.

== Types ==
The damphu generally used during performances and celebrations and is like a bodhrán, a single-sided circular frame drum decorated with symbols or left plain. It can have a small stick 4 to 6 inches long attached to the instrument body or played just with the hands. This stick is made of a thin piece of koirala kath. The skin is tightened and held in place by 32 koirala kath pegs. These 32 pegs represent the Buddha and Bodhisattvas or Buddha's 32 physical symbols (lakshanas). Sometimes it has a mobile metal or wooden bird attached representing the mythical eponymous bird.

The Damphu is not to be confused with a similar drum, the dhyāngro having jingles, which is used exclusively in ritual by Nepali shamans. The Dhyāngro is a double-sided disk-shaped drum topped with leather having a long wooden handle. Dhyāngro in is used for religious and ritual work only.

== Importance ==
As a traditional folk instrument, the ancient Damphu is very popular. Along with the original rhythm of Tamang Selo music, it has an important influence in Nepalese culture. It is easy to learn and easy to play. Tamba singers present Tamang historical and ritual songs with the damphu.

== Use ==
Tamang people use damphu in every event, such as weddings, funerals, special occasions, rituals and festivals where importantly, they express happiness, sadness, remember ancestors and tell their history through songs accompanied by the damphu.

== See also ==
- Navneet Aditya Waiba
- Music of Nepal
- Tamang People
- Madal
- Dhyāngro
- Tungna
