= Tamang Selo =

Genre of folk song sung by the Tamang people

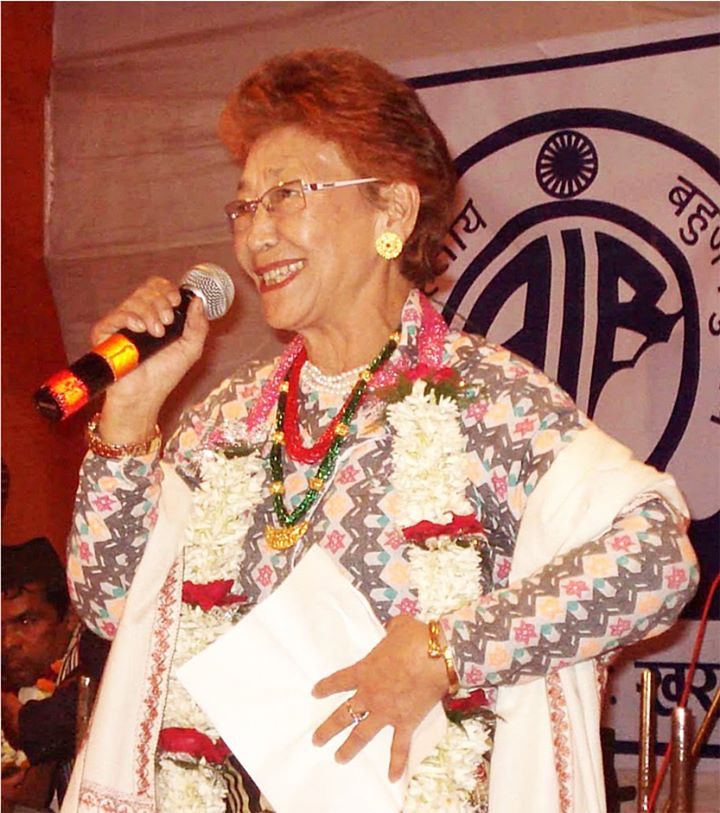
Hira Devi Waiba- Pioneer of Tamang Selo and Nepali Folk songs.

Tamang Selo (Nepali: तामाङ सेलो) is a genre of Nepali folk song sung by the Tamang people of Nepal and is widely popular among the Nepali-speaking community in Nepal, in India, and around the world. It is usually accompanied by the Tamang instruments: Damphu, Madal and Tungna. A Selo could be very catchy and lively or slow and melodious and is usually sung to express love, sorrow and stories of day to day life.

== Hira Devi Waiba, pioneer of Nepali folk songs and Tamang Selo ==
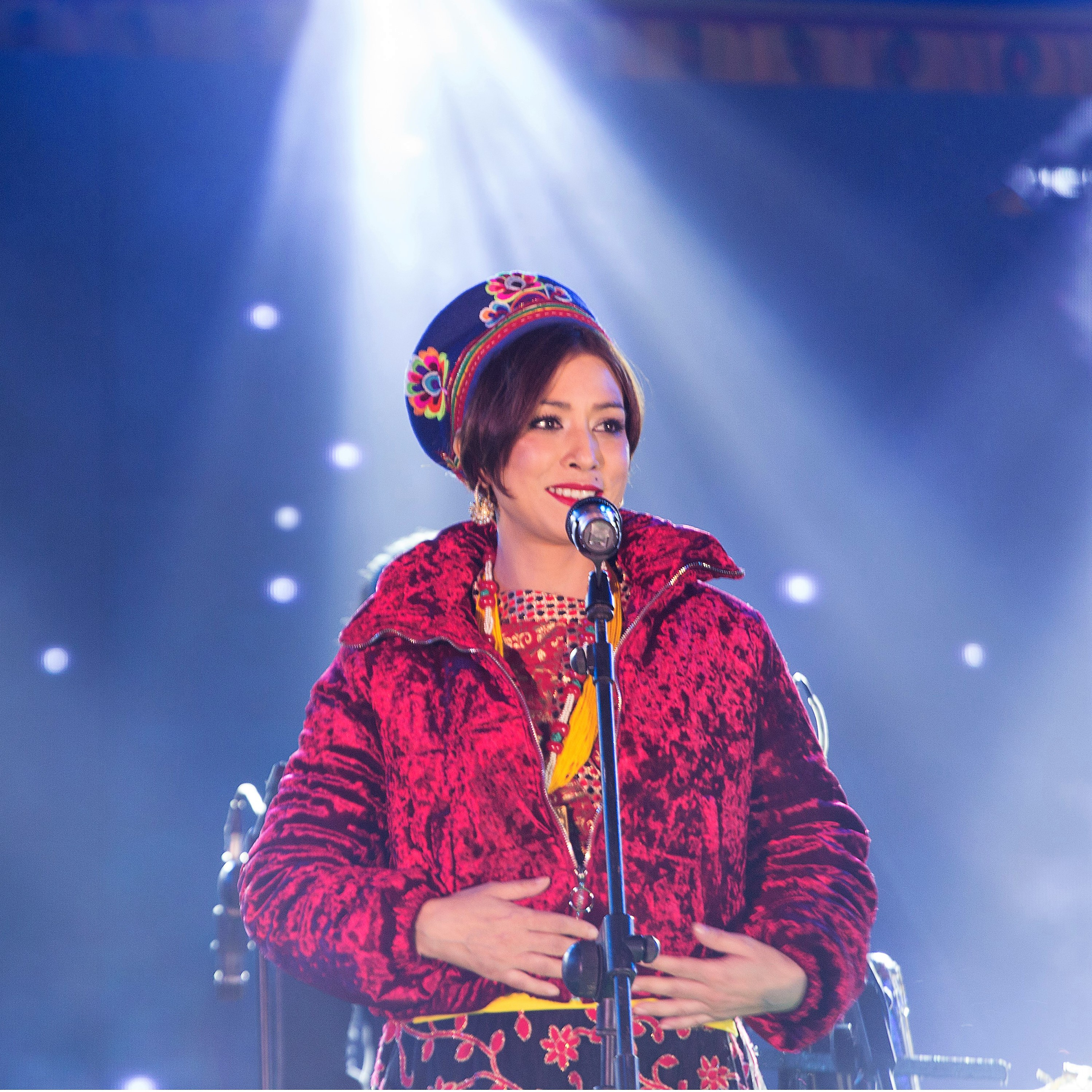
Navneet Aditya Waiba-Nepali and Tamang folk singer

Hira Devi Waiba is hailed as the pioneer of Nepali folk songs and Tamang Selo. Her song "Chura ta Hoina Astura" (Nepali: चुरा त होइन अस्तुरा) is said to be the first Tamang Selo ever recorded. Waiba has sung nearly 300 songs in a career spanning 40 years. Waiba's children Navneet Aditya Waiba and Satya Aditya Waiba have carried the legacy further by continuing on her footsteps.

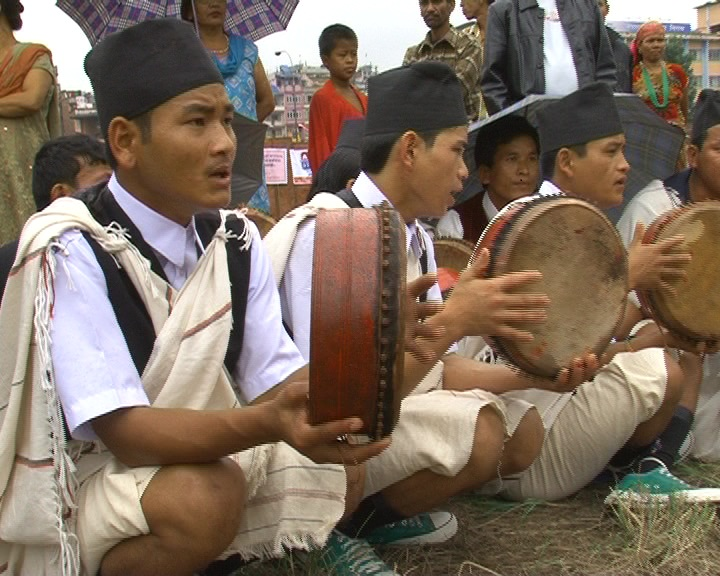
Nepali people playing one of their traditional instruments, "Damphu"

== See also ==
- Hira Devi Waiba
- Navneet Aditya Waiba
- Tamang people
