= Navneet Aditya Waiba =

Indian singer

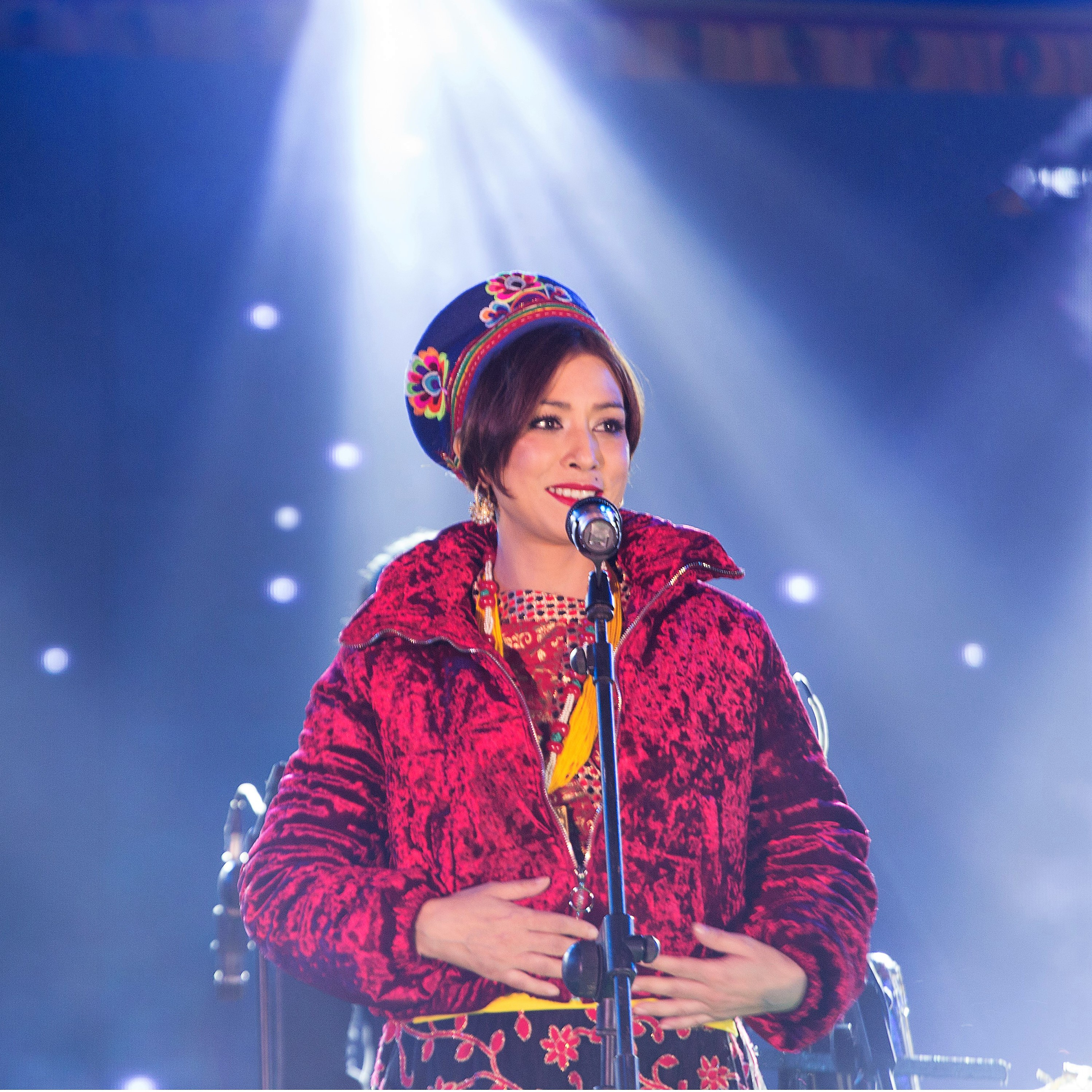

Background information
- Born: Kurseong, West Bengal, India
- Origin: Darjeeling
- Genres: Nepali Folk, Tamang Selo Sorathi, Madalay
- Occupation: Nepali folk singer
- Years active: 2016–present
- Label: OKListen
- Mother: Hira Devi Waiba

Navneet Aditya Waiba is an Indian singer who primarily sings in Nepali-language and the daughter of the late Hira Devi Waiba, the pioneer of Nepali folk music. Navneet and brother Satya Aditya (producer/manager) maintain the essence of the folk music genre by producing authentic traditional Nepali folk songs using traditional musical instruments.

== Early life ==
Navneet Aditya Waiba was born to mother Hira Devi Waiba and father Ratan Lal Aditya, and was raised in the hill town of Kurseong in West Bengal, India. Both Nanveet and Satya grew up in a musical environment owing to their mother and grandfather Sri Singh Man Singh Waiba who also happened to be their mother's musical mentor/coach.

== Education and previous career ==
Navneet obtained her Master of English (MA) degree from North Bengal University, West Bengal, India. She worked as a senior flight purser with Cathay Pacific Airlines, Hong Kong.

== Musical career ==
=== Team ===
Satya Aditya Waiba, her brother produces and manages the music whilst the Kutumba band from Kathmandu give music to the songs.

=== Musical journey ===
After the death of their mother, Hira Devi Waiba in 2011, Navneet and Satya teamed up and began work to revive, protect and popularise authentic traditional Nepali Folk Music thus keeping the family's age old generational musical legacy alive. Their songs mostly reflect on women's issues, conflicts and difficulties in the Nepali society.

The brother and sister duo re-arranged and re-recorded Hira Devi Waiba's songs and in 2015 they handpicked Hira Devi Waiba's most iconic and popular songs. They named the album Ama Lai Shraddhanjali - Tribute to Mother and released it on 3 November 2017 at the historic venue, Patan Museum in Kathmandu, Nepal.

"I would like to inspire the younger generation to go back to the roots we belong to. I feel that the songs will bring back those memories." -Navneet Aditya Waiba

== Discography ==
=== Album ===
All tracks are written by Singh Man Singh Waiba (Navneet and Satya's grandfather).

Ama Lai Shraddhanjali – (CD, digital download, online radio)
No.	Title	Length
1.	"Aye Syangbo"	4:23
2.	"Chuiya ma Hah"	4:12
3.	"Dhankuta"	4:07
4.	"Ramri ta Ramri"	3:27
5.	"Jhilke Naachayko"	4:23
6.	"Phariya Lyaaidiyechan"	4:35
7.	"Kahu Bela"	1:23
Total length:		23:30

=== Singles ===
- Sirphul Dhuna
- Bari Lai
- Dhiki Kuti
- Tin Dang Tin Dhang Madal Bajyo
- Udho Jada

== See also ==
- Ama Lai Shraddhanjali - Music album
- Hira Devi Waiba
