= List of bands from Nepal =

Overview of notable musical bands from Nepal

This is a list of notable Nepalesei musical bands or groups.

Band	Genre	Originated	Active years	Notes
1974 AD	Rock	Kathmandu	1994–Present	
Albatross	Rock	Kathmandu	1998–Present	
Anuprastha	Rock	Kathmandu	2004–Present	
Cobweb	Rock, metal	Kathmandu	1992–Present	
Crossroads	Folk pop	Kathmandu	1992–1999	
Gyanmala Bhajan Khala	Hymns	Kathmandu	1937 – Present	
Kutumba	Folk	Kathmandu	2004 – Present	
Mongolian Heart	Folk	Kathmandu	1993 – Present	
Mukti and Revival	Blues	Kathmandu	1992 – Present	
Nepathya	Folk rock	Pokhara	1991 – Present	
Night	Folk	Kathmandu	2006 – Present	
Robin and The New Revolution	Rock	Kathmandu	1993–Present	
The Shadows	Rock	Chitwan	1997–Present	
The Edge Band	Pop, Rock	Pokhara	1998–Present	
The Himalayans	Pop Rock	Hong Kong	1973–1981	
The Uglyz	Pop rock	Lalitpur	1995–Present	

== See also ==
- Music of Nepal
