= Music of Nepal =

Music of Nepal refers to the various musical genres played and listened to in Nepal. With more than fifty ethnic groups in Nepal, the country's music is highly diverse. Genres like Tamang Selo, Madheshi Hori, Chaitawar, Chhathiyaar dhun, Chyabrung, Dohori, Adhunik Geet, Bhajan, Filmi music, Ghazal, Classical music, songs and Ratna music are widely played and popular, but many other less common genres are yet to be cataloged. Western musical genres like Rock, Metal, Hip-Hop, Rap, R&B also regularly feature on the Nepalese music charts. Most of the country's musical bands are based in the Kathmandu valley. Musical genres from Tibet and India have greatly influenced Nepalese music.

== Genres ==
=== Tamang music ===
The Tamang community is well known for the Damphu, a traditional instrument. Tamang Selo music is accompanied by the Damphu and Tungna. It is said that British people derived the idea of making drum sets from Damphu during their stay in India. Some modern Tamang Selo music also shows influences of western and Indian instruments.

Hira Devi Waiba is hailed as the pioneer of Nepali folk songs. She sang about 300 songs throughout her 40-year musical career. After Hira Devi Waiba died in 2011, her son Satya Waiba and daughter Navneet Aditya Waiba took upon the task of reviving her songs, re-recorded them with a new sound and released them in Navneet's voice. They named the album Ama Lai Shraddhanjali - Tribute to Mother. Navneet is the only artist in the Nepali folk music genre who sings authentic traditional Nepali folk songs without adulteration or modernisation.

=== Dohori ===
Dohori is a genre of Nepali folk music and has roots in the rural courtship traditions. In Nepali, Dohori literally means from both sides or a debate. This debate is in musical rhythm, and involves quick and witty poetry. The two teams taking part in a Dohori usually involve boys and girls in rival teams. The song starts with a question, usually from the boys' side. The girl follows the question with a quick response and the two teams continue the musical conversation.

Dohori songs can last for as long as a week. The length of the Dohori depends on the quick thinking ability and wit of the players.

=== Adhunik Geet ===
Adhunik Geet are popular songs in Nepal and are also known as sugam sangeet. These songs are soft and melodious. One of the most famous singers of this genre was late Narayan Gopal who was also known as a "Swar Samrat", meaning King of 'Voice' in Nepali. He sang hits like "Euta Manchhe Ko", and "Yeti Dherai Maya Dii". Aruna Lama was one of the well-known c. She is popularly known as the "Nightingale of the Hills". She has sung hundreds of Nepali songs. While Kiran Kharel, Ratnashamser Thapa, Subash Chandra Dhungel, Rajendra Thapa, Dinesh Adhikari are remarkable names from older generation. In contemporary songwriting, Ramesh Dahal, Prakash Saput, Sheetal Kadambini, Rakhi Gauchan are some of the impactful lyricist and songwriters. Ramesh Dahal is known to write for social change, peace and inclusion.

=== Classical ===
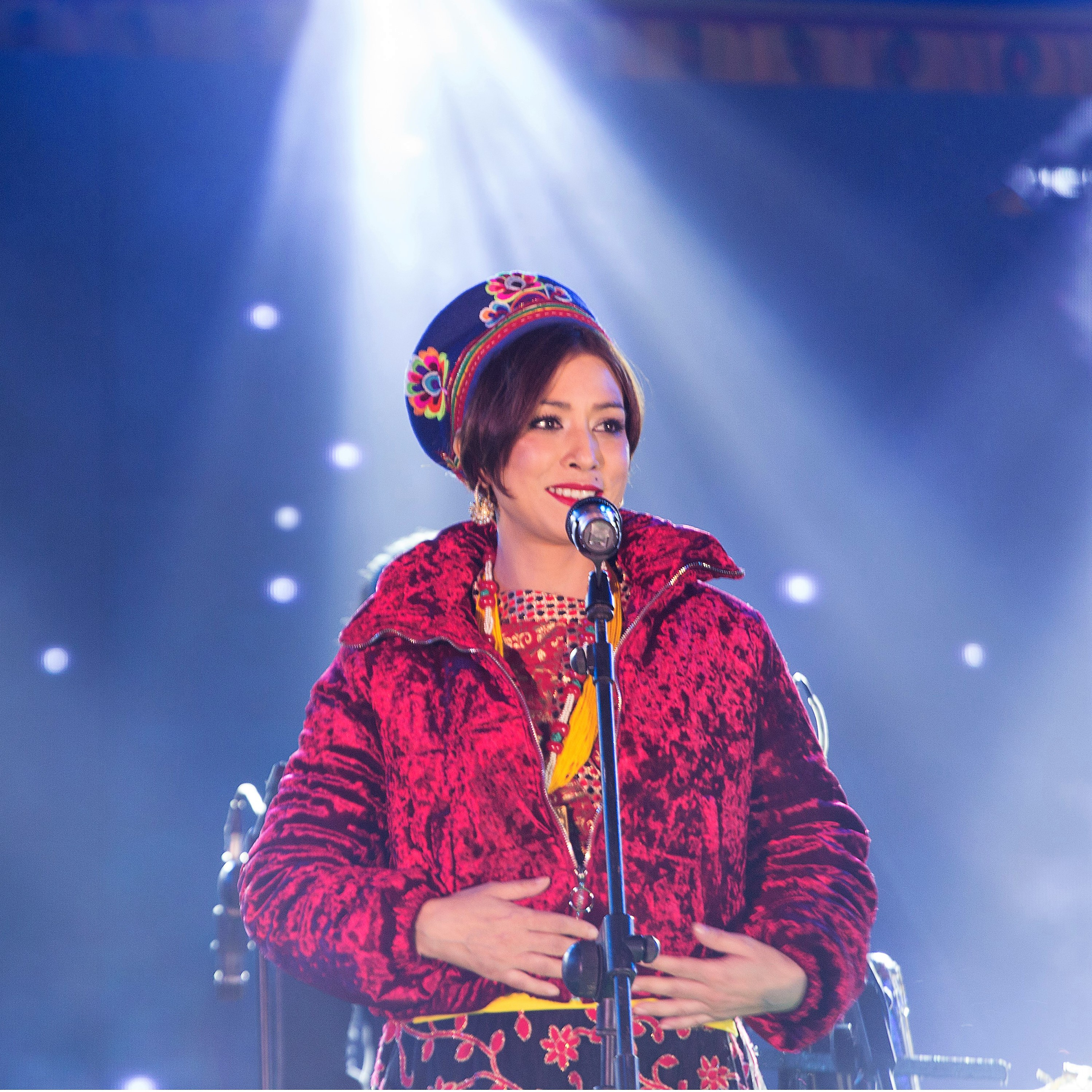
Navneet Aditya Waiba is a Nepali-language folk singer and the only artist in the Nepali folk music genre who sings and produces authentic traditional Nepali folk songs without adulteration or modernisation using mostly organic and traditional Nepali music instruments.

There are numerous professional classical musicians in the Kathmandu Valley. Bands such as Sur-Sudha, Sukarma, Trikaal, Kutumba are popular and well known in Nepal. Classical music organizations such as Kalanidhi Indira Sangeet Mahavidyalaya, Nepal Sangeet Vidyalaya, SK Gurukul Sangeet Pathshala, Narayan Music Academy, Gandharva Sangeet Vidyalaya, Shree Sangeet Pathshala, Kirateswor Sangeet Ashram, Kapan Sanger Sarowar, Yalamaya Kendra, Ram Mandir, Gurukul Sangeet Pathshala, Atul Music Memorial Gurukul etc. have been continuously contributing to the development of Nepali classical music. Some renowned classical musicians are Tara Bir Singh Tuladhar (born 1943), Sitarist Uma Thapa (born 1950) Bijaya Vaidya, Prem Rana, Manose Singh (born 1979), Mohan Sundar Shrestha (born 1943), Surendra Shrestha and Sur Sudha.

=== Maithili Music ===
Maithili Music is one of the most ancient types of music in South Asia. It originated from Mithila region which is now divided between India and Nepal. No one knows exactly when Maithili Music came into existence, probably due to the length of its history, but its age indicates that it might have helped other music develop and flourish in India and Nepal. Although Maithili music is usually played by classical instruments, it has been modernized and now uses various modern instruments. Some significant contributors to this music style are Maha Kavi Vidyapati Thakur, Udit Narayan Jha and Sharda Sinha. The region's folk songs are associated with the various events in the life of an ordinary person.

=== Newa music ===
Newa music, also called Newar Music, is a form of traditional music developed in Nepal by the Newars. The music has its roots in classical Hindu and Buddhist music and evolved with the incorporation of folk music of the Kathmandu valley and its peripheries. Instruments used are mainly percussion and wind instruments. Notable Newar singer Narayan Gopal. Regarded one of the cultural icons in Nepal, he is referred as "Swar Samrat" (Nepali: स्वर सम्राट, meaning: Emperor of Voice) in Nepali music. He is also known as "Tragedy King" owing to his numerous tragedy songs.

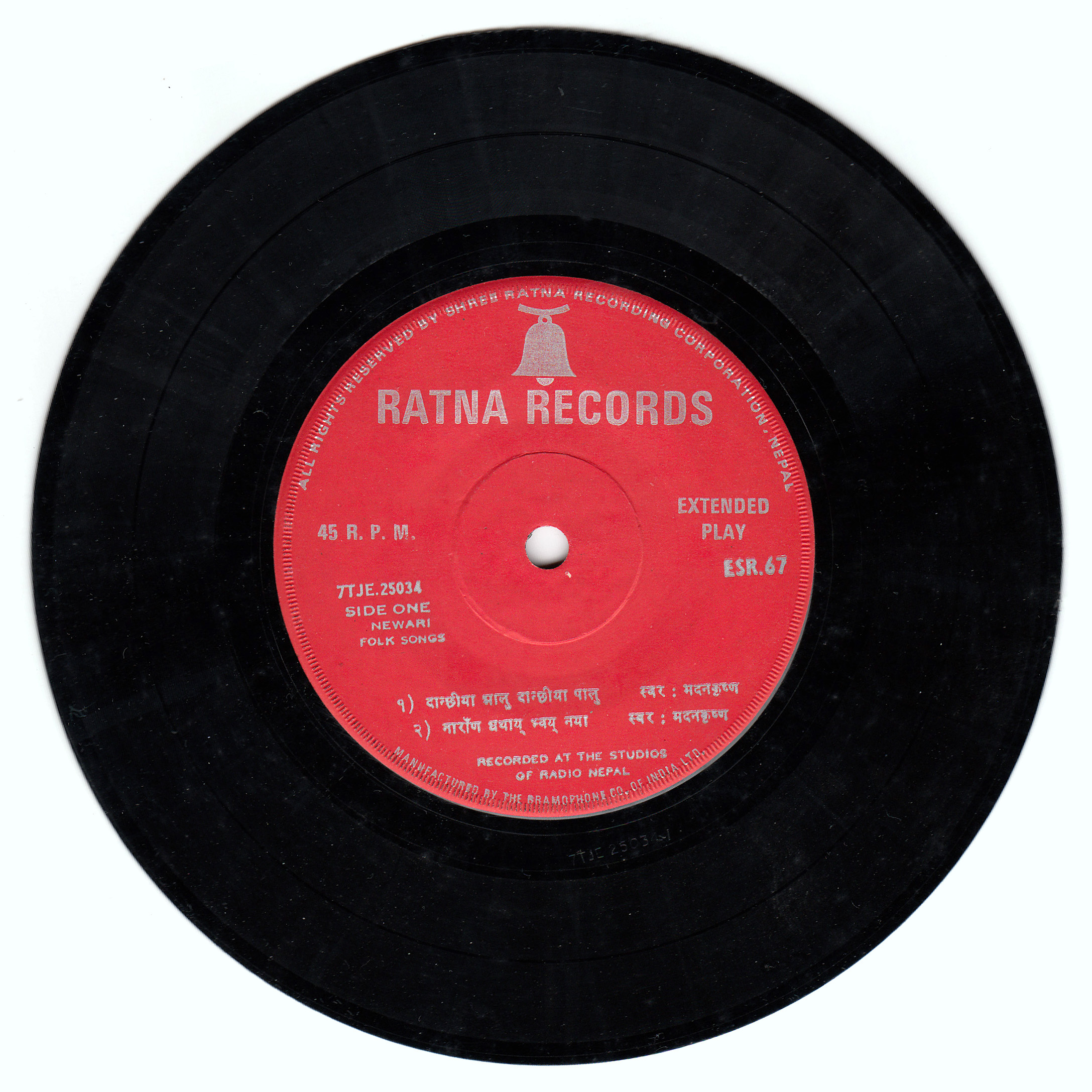
Gramophone record of the song "Danchhi ya alu" by Madan Krishna Shrestha

"Dhime" a traditional drum, is used by the Newar People in many occasions.

At the end of 2005, The Lakhey (First Newa Metal Band)(Navras Shrestha) Recorded their First Newa Metal Song - Dhampa tacha.

=== Gurung music ===
Gurungs have an ancient tradition of Rodhi where young people meet, sing and dance to folk songs, and share their views. Young men and women at Rodhi often sing the Dohori. Some musical dances like Ghantu Jhorra, Chudka, yanimaya, salaijyo, sorathi, thoda bhaka are still in existence, and is performed in many Gurung villages. These dance forms are centuries old and are performed either solo or in a group. Music also plays a big role in the Gurung ritual of Argum, which is performed when someone in the community dies. Notable Gurung singer - Khem Raj Gurung, Jyoti Gurung.

=== Kirat music ===
The Limbu (Yakthung) have various forms of songs, dances and musical instruments. Of them, Dhan Nach (paddy dance) and Chyabrung (Chyabrung Nach "drum dance") are most popular. Rai (Khambu) celebrate Sakela, a dance performed during the occasion of "Udauli" and "Ubhuali" which is the most important festival of Kirati peoples. Many dance forms involve rituals and religious offerings towards Mundhum.

=== Magar music ===
Salaijo, Kaura, Maruni, Sorathi, Purkheuli, Hurra, Yanimaya and Jhamre are some exclusive musical genres of Magar music. Kaura originated in Ranipokhari, Tanahun where girls would usually dance to the beat of the Khaijadi. Sorathi, Maruni or Purkheuli is where Males would dress up in Female clothing and Dance to the beat of the Madal.

=== Sherpa music ===
Sherpa music is based on Tibetan Buddhism. It is similar to music of Tibet around the trans-Himalayan region. Tibetan music is mostly religious music, reflecting the influence of Tibetan Buddhism.

"With influence from Tibet, this Nepalese music is characterized by unison singing and occasional accompaniment on the damian, a stringed instrument in the lute family that provides a strong rhythmic base. The musicians generally sing in Helambu (a Sherpa-Tibetan dialect) and sometimes in Tibetan on themes of religion, a desire for material wealth, the natural landscape, and a “sense of an ordered world in contrast to the nomadic pattern of many peoples’ lives” (Bishop). Liner notes include a description of the village and its music, track notes, and lyrics in Helambu/Tibetan and English".

=== Tharu music ===
Tharu music is also one of the ancient types of music still played in Nepal. Tharu music is very diverse within itself as Tharus from various parts of nepal do not share the same Tharu language. The Tharu people sing songs like Sajana, Maghiya, and Dashainya mostly in the western parts of Nepal.

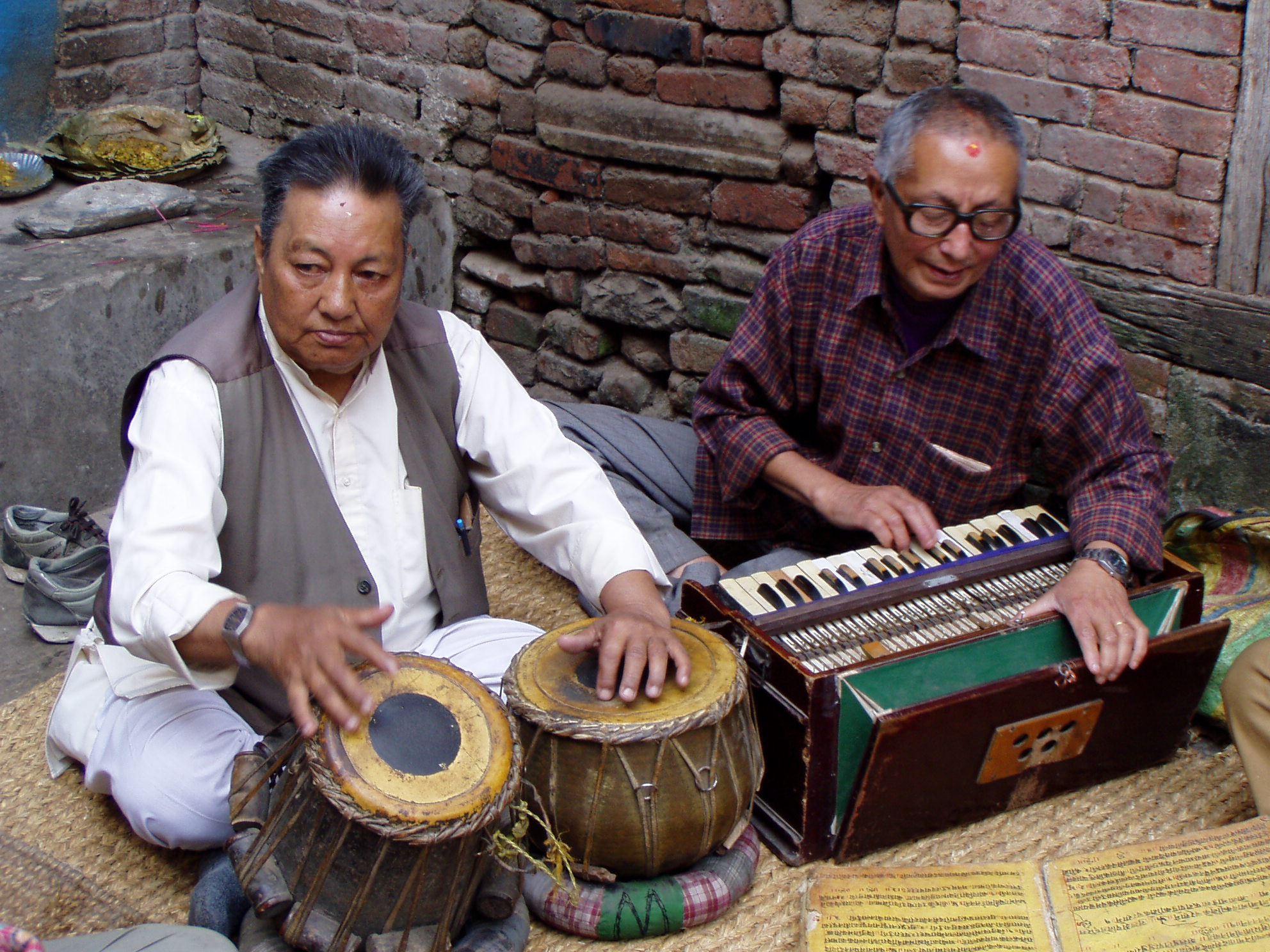
Musicians singing devotional songs

=== Bhajan ===
A bhajan is a devotional song praising and sometimes calling upon the Gods. It has no fixed form; it may be as simple as a mantra or kirtan. It is usually lyrical, expressing love and prayer for the Divine. Shiva, Krishna & Vishnu bhajans are popular in Nepal. Notable Bhajan singers Bhakta Raj Acharya, Koili Devi Mathema.

=== Filmi music ===
Filmi music is popular in Nepal and produced for mainstream motion pictures. Cinema in Nepal has a short history hence filmi music is still evolving.

=== Gazal ===
The Gazal is a poetic form of music consisting of rhyming couplets and a refrain, with each line sharing the same meter. A gazal may be understood as a poetic expression of pain, loss and separation, beauty of love and nature. It is a delicate form of poetry and music. The form is ancient, originating in 6th-century Arabic verse. Gazals spread into South Asia in the 12th century owing to the influence of Sufi mystics and the courts of the new Islamic Sultanate in India and South Asia. Although the gazal is a form of Dari and Urdu poetry, its influence can be seen in the poetry of many languages of the Indian sub-continent. Motiram Bhatta introduced the written form of gazal in Nepali language circa 1890. Seturam Shrestha (1891-1941) has been credited with pioneering gazals in Nepal.

== Other influences ==
Like other parts of the world, Nepal too had its share of modern influences and representations. The impact of these influences poses a risk to Nepalese folk music. As a result, there is a growing number of startups like Baja Nepal and other local initiatives that are emerging to encourage the conservation of folk music.

Some notable acts are:

=== Rock/Metal ===
- Robin and The New Revolution
- Abhaya & the Steam Injuns
- 1974 AD
- Cobweb
- Albatross
- Mantra
- The Axe
- The Edge Band
- The Lakhey Band (Navras Shrestha)
- Mukti N Revival
- Amokkshan
- Shadow In Shade
- Antim Grahan
- Divine Influence
- Dying Out Flame
- Kalodin
- Rage Hybrid
- Serpent Gaze
- Ugrakarma
- Underside
- X-Mantra
- Nude Terror
- Near Mirror

=== Pop ===
- Om Bikram Bista
- Nabin K Bhattarai
- Indira Joshi
- Jyoti Ghimire
- Sajjan Raj Vaidya
- Sugam Pokharel
- Raju Lama
- Ram Krishna Dhakal
- Norden Tenzing Bhutia
- Sanjay Shrestha
- Nepathya
- Neetesh Jung Kunwar
- Bartika Eam Rai
- Bipul Chettri
- Trishala Gurung
- Deep Shrestha
- Bikki Gurung
- Rajesh Napali
- Jerusha Rai
- Ankit Shrestha
- Babina Bhattarai
- Deepak Bajracharya

=== Hip Hop (Nephop) ===
- Yama Buddha (Anil Adhikari)
- Girish Khatiwada (Gorkhali G)
- Hero Hera Laal (Kuldeep)
- BEAIM (Bhupendra Bam)
- Uniq Poet (Utsaha Joshi)
- Nasty (Abhishek Baniya)
- Sacar aka Lil Buddha (Sacar Adhikari)
- VTEN (Samir Ghising)
- GRIZZLE
- V$X (Sachin K.C)
- BALEN (Balen Shah)
- MC FLO (Anurag Sharma)
- Symfamous (Saurav Shrestha)
- Easi 12 (Tsering D. Sherpa)
- Yoddha (Shaman Gurung)
- Manas Ghale
- Laure (Aashish Rana)
- Dong (Mahesh Dong)
- Mr.D (Sandip Bista)
- G-Bob (Sudeep Bhandari)

=== Bands ===
- 1974 AD
- Albatross
- Anuprastha
- Cobweb
- Kandara
- Kta haru
- Kutumba
- Mantra
- Monkey Temple
- Mukti and Revival
- Nepathya
- Pahenlo Batti Muni
- Phosphenes
- Sabin Rai and The Pharaoh
- The Edge Band
- The Elements
- The Shadows 'Nepal'
- Kuma Sagar and the Khwopa

=== Nepali edm ===
- R younker (Ranjan Raj Khanal)

== Awards ==
Since 1965, Radio Nepal has organized the annual National Modern Song Competition, a government-run competition that recognizes excellence in lyrics, music, and singing.

With the growth and development of the Nepali music industry, different award ceremonies are held in different parts of the country, some focusing on local talent. Awards of national level are held each year by some media houses, namely Kalika FM, Hits FM, National Music Awards (formarly Radio Kantipur Music Awards) Music Khabar Music Award, Tuborg Image Awards (formarly Image FM Awards), and Bindabasini Music Awards.

Lyricists' Association of Nepal organizes the National Creator Honor Award including cash, Song of the Year Award including cash, and the Award including cash for the lyricist who writes in the mother language each year.

Atul Memorial Music Gurukul, was established in 2003 in memory of Nepali Tabla Maestro Atul Gautam. Since then, the organization has been awarding Nepali classical maestros once a year on the occasion of Atul Jayanti.

== See also ==
- Navneet Aditya Waiba
- Musical instruments of Nepal
