= Samaya (album) =

Studio album by Bipul Chettri
- Released: 22 May 2021
- Recorded: 2020–21
- Studio: Plug N' Play Studios
- Genre: Folk/Nepali folk
- Length: 18.12
- Label: Independent
- Producer: Bipul Chettri

Bipul Chettri chronology
Maya (2016)	Samaya (2021)

Samaya is the third studio album by Indian singer-songwriter Bipul Chettri.

Bipul's EP, ‘Samaya’ (which means time, period or juncture) was written during the COVID-19 pandemic. It was praised by critics for its minimal, yet evocative, compositions.

== Production ==
All songs of the album are written, composed, arranged and produced by Bipul Chettri.

Recording, mixing and mastering was done by Anindo Bose at Plug n’ Play Studios, New Delhi.

== Reviews ==
Rock Street Journal: Bipul Chettri Finds Endless Beauty In Solitude. His lockdown EP ‘Samaya’ is without doubt one of best collections of indie songs this year. ‘Samaya’ doesn't have much in the way of instrumentation or elaborate production. It doesn't need it. Bipul's voice and songwriting does all the work and everything around it just accentuates that. This is an EP that is a statement of the time we’re all in and the thoughts of a man stuck in it. We should be thankful that these feelings can be put into song, because some of us don't know how to do that. Bipul Chettri does, though. And we can revel in listening to it. Find a quiet evening and be blown away.

Rolling Stone India: Kalimpong-origin, New Delhi-based songsmith Bipul Chettri crafts a patient, adorned and sagacious EP with Samaya. Singing in Nepali, flittering acoustic guitar melodies form the bed for Chettri's journeying stories.

First Post: In Chettri's first two albums Sketches of Darjeeling (2014) and Maya (2016), the Kalimpong-born, New Delhi-based musician heart-warmingly evokes scenes of life and love in his beloved mountains. But in Samaya, he laments; albeit in his distinct velvety voice — a heady palliative. Having composed Samaya during the 2020 lockdown, he says, “every song was written with a purpose to describe the sense of my or the world's being at that particular point in time, which is also why it is called Samaya (time)”.

== Track listing ==
No.	Title	Length
1.	"Katai Uslai"	4:47
2.	"Samsara"	3:35
3.	"Samaya"	3:47
4.	"Naya Din"	3:25
5.	"Bhaans Ghari"	3:28

== Personnel ==
- Bipul Chettri– vocals, guitars, harmonica, backing vocals
- Anindo Bose– organ on Samaya
- Pranai Gurung– slide guitars on Samara and guitars on Naya Din
- Rohit Prasanna– bamboo flute
- Sonam Tashi– executive producer
- Anindo Bose– recorded, mixed and mastered at Plug 'N' Play Studios
- Bipul Chettri– producer
