= Maya (Bipul Chettri album) =

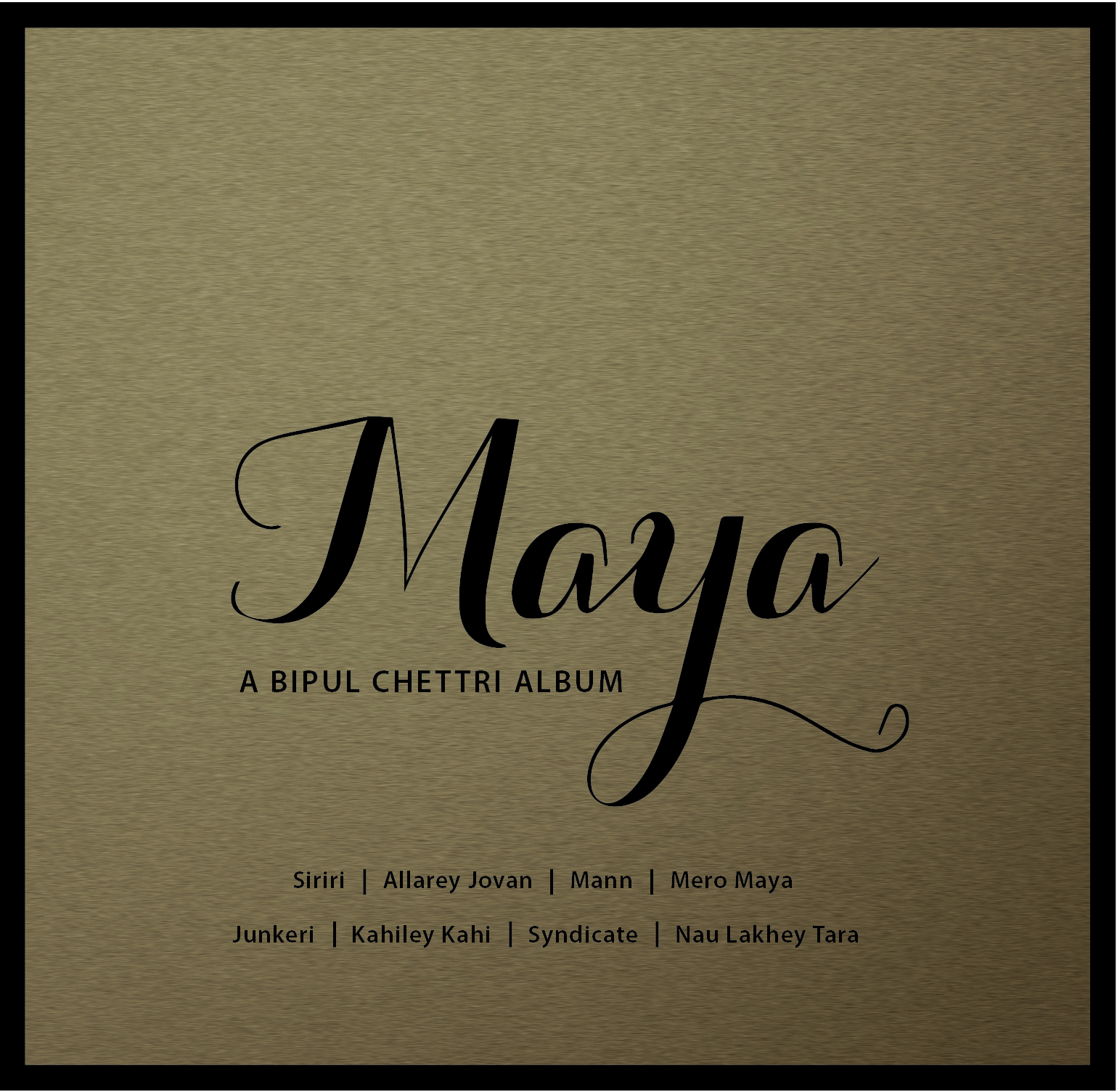

Studio album by Bipul Chettri
- Released: September 2, 2016
- Genre: Nepali Folk
- Length: 37 Minutes
- Language: Nepali
- Label: Independent
- Producer: Bipul Chettri

Bipul Chettri chronology
Sketches of Darjeeling (2014)	Maya (2016)	Samaya (2021)

Maya (transl. Love) is the second studio album by singer and songwriter Bipul Chettri of Nepali folk music. It was released on September 2, 2016, independently by Bipul Chettri. “Maya”, as the name suggests, is about love. Love found, love lost, love given, love reciprocated, love imagined and, always, that love for the hills Bipul calls home. The album is follow-up to Sketches of Darjeeling.

== Background ==
Bipul Chettri released the song on September 2, 2016, via the iTunes, OKListen, Amazon, Spotify and Gaana.

== Track listing ==
No.	Title	Singer(s)	Length
1.	"Siriri"	Bipul Chettri	4:33
2.	"Allarey Jovan"	Bipul Chettri	5:00
3.	"Mann"	Bipul Chettri	5:31
4.	"Mero Maya"	Bipul Chettri	3:37
5.	"Junkeri"	Bipul Chettri	4:04
6.	"Kahiley Kahi"	Bipul Chettri	4:30
7.	"Syndicate"	Bipul Chettri	4:40
8.	"Nau Lakhey Tara"	Bipul Chettri	5:13
Total length:			37:00

== Reception ==
"Mid 2016 saw the launch of his second album ‘Maya’ which cemented Bipul as the face of Nepali music for many. Yet, his demeanours don't reflect the effects you would expect such fame and success would have on him." Beehy wrote "“Maya” in Hinduism stands for the supernatural power wielded by gods and demons."

In a list of The Daily Pao the album was listed in the best-selling indian independent music albums of 2016 and it was in number 4. And the song in album "Syndicate" was listed in best selling song in the list of The Daily Pao at number four.

'In both his albums, Chettri stands apart with an unpretentiousness that reflects the simplicity of mountain life. Eschewing studio over-production, his music has a rare transportable quality, and not just for the guileless singing or the effortless blending of instruments such as the Nepali sarangi.' (Live Mint)

"You realise, when you hear his voice, that his songs are not lucky accidents. They have—each of them—stories, incidents to tell. Bipul Chettri patiently tells you

how Syndicate or Siriri or Junkeri got made — the songs he put into his new album called Maya." (Deccan Chronicle)

== Tours ==
- The Maya Tour (with The Travelling Band)

== Release history ==
Country	Date	Label
India	September 2, 2016	Independent
