= Jerusha Rai =

- Born: 1990 (age 35–36); Khotang, Nepal
- Education: Middlesex University (Sociology)
- Occupations: Singer; song-writer
- Years active: 2011–present
- Musical career
- Origin: Kathmandu, Nepal
- Genres: Indie music; Nepalese music
- Labels: Music Nepal; Superstar Entertainment; Asian Music

Jerusha Rai (born c. 1990) is a Nepali indie singer-songwriter and Music Producer known for her experimental fusion of traditional Nepali folk sounds with contemporary pop, rock, and electronic influences.

== Biography ==
Rai's family was originally from Khotang but she was born and grew up in Kathmandu and attended St. Mary's Secondary School, Jawalakhel. She was immersed in Nepali folk music and instruments. As a teenager, she formed Nepal's first all-girl band and began writing her own songs, inspired by Western artists like Alanis Morissette as well as Nepali acts.

In 2010, Rai relocated to London, England for university studies. She became involved with the Nepali diaspora music scene, refining her skills while jamming with other artists. Rai self-released her first EP, We All Make Mistapes, and singles, garnering attention after her song "Oblivion" went viral online.

Her breakthrough came with the 2016 release of her debut album A Dark Place to Think on which Rai wrote, produced, recorded and designed everything herself. The intimate album tackled themes of displacement, isolation, and melancholy with Rai's evocative songwriting.

Rai's second album, Sunsaan (2019), incorporated more of her native language and explored Nepal's political turmoil and mental health issues through poetic lyrics. Songs like "Barud" about the Nepalese Civil War became beloved hits.

Throughout her career, Rai has celebrated her indigenous Kiranti roots and used music as a medium of healing. She returned to perform in Nepal in 2022, while splitting time between the US and UK as her fame grew.

== Disappearance ==
In 2023, Rai mysteriously disappeared after leaving her Kathmandu home without her phone. Police efforts to locate her proved fruitless. Rai's unresolved disappearance shocked Nepal's music scene where she had been praised as a pioneering female indie artist and powerful creative voice.
