= Norden Tenzing Bhutia =

Indian singer and composer (1950–2019)

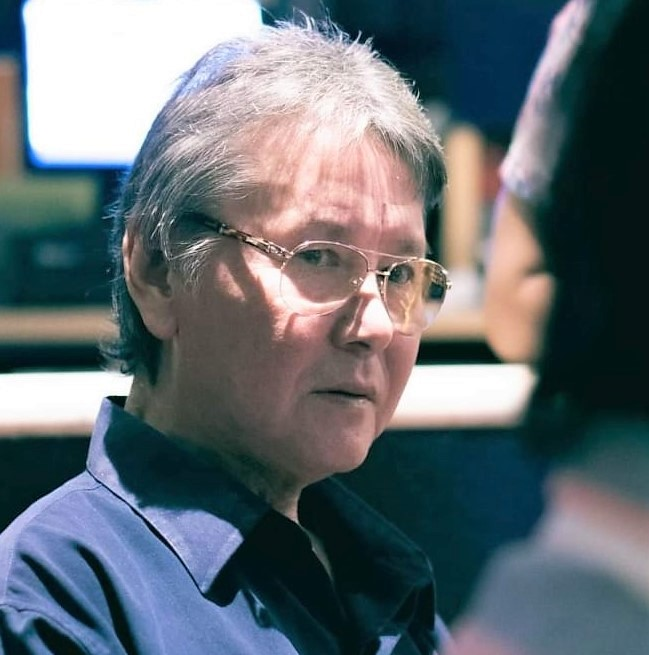
- Born: 21 January 1950; Kolkata, India
- Died: 4 August 2019 (aged 69); Aldershot, United Kingdom
- Occupations: Singer, musician, composer, ex-British Gurkha
- Known for: The Himalayans
- Spouse: Anne Tenzin
- Children: 3

Norden Tenzing Bhutia was a musician, composer and singer of classic Nepali pop songs like 'Musu Musu Hasi Deu', 'Gajalu le Aakhai Chopne', 'Kaha Timro Mayalu Lai'. In the 1970s Bhutia was the vocalist and guitarist of the very popular Nepali ensemble, The Himalayans. Bhutia is credited with transforming Nepali music and heralding a change in musical taste and content. Bhutia was one of the pioneers to introduce rock, pop and blues to Nepali mainstream music.

== Life and career ==
Bhutia was born in Kurseong, Dist. Darjeeling on 21 January 1950 and raised in Kurseong (Darjeeling). He joined the British Army in 1971 and after serving as a British Gurkha soldier in Her Majesty's Armed Forces, settled in Aldershot and started his own business. Bhutia is survived by his wife and three children.

Bhutia started his musical career after joining the British Army, where he met likeminded Nepalese musicians and formed The Himalayans. He had his first hit with "Gajalule Akhai Chopne", other songs that he was best known for include "Musu Musu Hasi Deu", "Gajalu Le Akhai Chopne", and "Kaha Timro Mayalu Lai".

Bhutia died in Aldershot, England on 4 August 2019.

== See also ==
- Music of Nepal
- British Army
- Brigade of Gurkhas
