= Cobweb (band) =

Nepal's first hard rock band

Background information
- Origin: Patan, Nepal
- Genres: Hard Rock
- Years active: 1993–present
- Members: Divesh Mulmi (Guitars/Vox); Nilesh Joshi (Bass); Ashish Gurung (Vox); Sujan Tandukar (Lead Guitars)
- Past members: Urdeep Joshi; Mahesh Nakarmi; Pawan Shakya; Rajendra Dhakhwa; Rohit Banmali; Sunil Shakya; Nikesh KC; Siddhartha Dhakhwa; Srijan Bikram Gewali; Sanjay Aryal
- Website: Cobweb Nepal

Cobweb is a hard rock band from Patan, Nepal. The band formed while its members were still in high school, releasing their first album Anjaan in 1993. Anjaan sold poorly but their subsequent album "Cobweb" was well received. "Cobweb" included the single "Maryo ni Maryo", which had an important role in bringing Nepalese rock to mainstream attention. The band is considered a trend setter in the modern Nepalese music industry.

== Career ==
The band was formed in 1993 with the release of the album Anjaan. The album and its music video were not well received by Nepalese society because they disliked the bands attire like their long hair and the earrings the male members wore, which was not common in the 1990s. The second and subsequent albums however, became popular amongst Nepalese youths. Their first video Maryo ni Maryo became a hit with youths after it was released on the Image Channel via Nepal Television.

Cobweb's album included imagery typical of Western heavy metal. However, the promotions strategy was similar to Aadhunik geet with descriptions such as 'devoted musicians out to conquer your heart' with 'heart winning music'.

== Albums ==
The band has produced the following albums.

Albums	year	Band
Anjaan	1993	Cobweb
Cobweb	1996	Cobweb
Rolling String	1998	Cobweb
Mercedes Benz	1999	Cobweb
Rock N Roll	2002	Cobweb
Swing	2004	Cobweb
Namaste	2009	Cobweb
Astitva	2016	Cobweb

== Members ==
=== Current band members ===
The current members of the band are listed below:

- Dibesh Mulmi (Guitar/Vocal)
- Nilesh Joshi (Bass)
- Bipin Shrestha (Drums)
- Sujan Tandukar (Guitars)
- Ashis Gurung (Vocalist)

=== Former band members ===
Former members of the band are listed below:

- Urdeep Joshi (1992–1995) (Drums)
- Mahesh Nakarmi (1992–2005) (Guitar)
- Pawan Shakya (1992–2005) (Keyboard)
- Rajendra Dakhwa (1995–1998) (Drums)
- Subodh Shahi (1997–1998) (Vocal)
- Rohit Banmali (2005–2010) (Vocal/Guitar)
- Sunil Shakya (2010–2013) (Vocal/Guitar)
- Nikesh KC (2013–2014) (Guitar)
- Sanjay Aryal (2013–2023) (Vocal)
- Srijan Bikram Gewali (2014–2022) (Guitar)
- Siddartha Dakhwa (1998–2024) (Drums)
- Progress karki (2025) (lineup)

== Concerts and shows ==
- Europe
- Finland
- Australia
- USA, 2017
- SAARC Band Festival in Delhi, 2009
- Dubai

== Awards ==
- Tuborg Music Awards

== See also ==
- 1974 AD
- Mukti and Revival
- Nepalese rock
