= The Shadows (Nepalese band) =

Nepalese rock band

The Shadows 'Nepal'
- Origin: Chitwan, Nepal
- Genres: Blues rock, rock and roll, hard rock
- Years active: 1997 — present
- Members: Swapnil Sharma (Vocals); Prakash Rasaily ( Guitars ) Amit Pradhan (Bass Guitar); Sahil Risal (Drums), Sujan Manandhar ( Guitars)
- Past members: Bikash Manandhar (Drums); Prashant VK - Babu (Rhythm Guitar); Basanta Shrestha (Vocals)

The Shadows Nepal is a hard rock band from Narayangarh, Chitwan, Nepal. They were established in 1997 and their first album was titled “Suna Hamro Sano Awaaz”.

Their second album, “ Hidne Manche Ladcha”, was a success in the Nepali market and earned them the best band, best music and best performance of the year 2006. The band is mostly popular for its influential lyrics that discusses social issues and awareness. They traveled to three cities of Australia as a part of their international tour in 2011.

The band's current line up : Swapnil Sharma in Vocals, Prakash Rasaily on Guitars, Sujan Manandhar ( Guitars ), Sahil Risal ( drums ) and Amit Pradhan on Bass. Rupesh Sen worked with the band for pretty long time as a band manager.

Song	Durations
Naya Nepal	4 minutes
Buddha Nepal Ko	6 minutes
Prakriti	6 minutes
Kun ho Hamro Dharma	5 minutes
Swarga ma thau chaina	4 minutes
Hidne manche ladcha	4 minutes
Ma	4 minutes
Suna Hamro Sano Awaz	5 minutes
Bhatkeko Kotha	4 minutes
Paap	4 minutes
Naari	4 minutes
Aath Din	4 minutes
Dharti Mathi ko bojh	4 minutes
K Pais Nepali Kera	4 minutes

Mounbrata|| 5 minutes

== See also ==
- Nepalese rock
