= Sketches of Darjeeling =

Studio album by Bipul Chettri
- Released: July 25, 2014
- Recorded: 2013–14
- Studio: Plug n’ Play Studios, New Delhi
- Genre: Nepali folk
- Length: 21:05
- Label: OKListen Media
- Producer: Bipul Chettri

Bipul Chettri chronology
Sketches of Darjeeling (2014)	Maya (2016)

Sketches of Darjeeling is the debut studio album by singer/songwriter Bipul Chettri.

The album is a collection of songs inspired by Bipul's life around the hills of Kalimpong and Darjeeling, two hill towns inhabited mostly by people of Nepalese ethnicities, that sits on the foothills of the Eastern Himalayas in the Indian state of West Bengal and close to the eastern border of Nepal and Bhutan. It explores the different elements and essence of life and culture of those areas with a blend of Nepali folk and contemporary western musical elements.

== Background ==
The foundation for the album was laid after the song "Wildfire (Dadhelo)" spread across playlists of Nepalese all around the world. The song was uploaded on SoundCloud in February 2013 and literally spread like a wildfire.

Recording session for the album begun in 2013. The album was released in 2014 on CD and online platforms. A vinyl record was released in 2021.

== Production ==
All songs of the album are written, composed, arranged and produced by Bipul Chettri except Ram Sailee, composed by Bipul's late father, Nirendra Mohan Chettri.

Recording, mixing and mastering was done by Anindo Bose at Plug n’ Play Studios, New Delhi.

== Awards ==
The album was nominated for multiple categories in the 19th Hero HITS 91.2 FM Awards 2072 (2016), held in Kathmandu, Nepal in March 2016. Among all the competition for "Best Pop/Rock Album" and "Album of the Year", Sketches of Darjeeling picked up the "Best Pop/Rock Album" award.

== Track listing ==
No.	Title	Length
1.	"Mountain High"	4:00
2.	"Wildfire (Dadhelo)"	3:30
3.	"Asaar"	3:49
4.	"Deorali Darah"	3:22
5.	"Ram Sailee - Ode to my Father"	3:20
6.	"Rail Garee"	3:04

== Personnel ==
- Bipul Chettri – Vocals, Guitars
- Anindo Bose – Keyboard, Bass
- Rahul Rai – Bass
- Upendra Raj Baraily – Drums, Percussion
- Reuben Narain – Drums, Percussion
- Toni Quadros – Trumpet
- Lokesh Anand – Shehnai
- Suhail Yusuf Khan – Sarangi
- Manohar Rai - Cover Art & Design
- Sonam Tashi - Photography & Cover Concept, Executive Producer
- Anindo Bose - Recorded, Mixed & Mastered at Plug 'N' Play Studios
- Bipul Chettri - Producer
