= Bipul Chettri =

Indian singer and songwriter

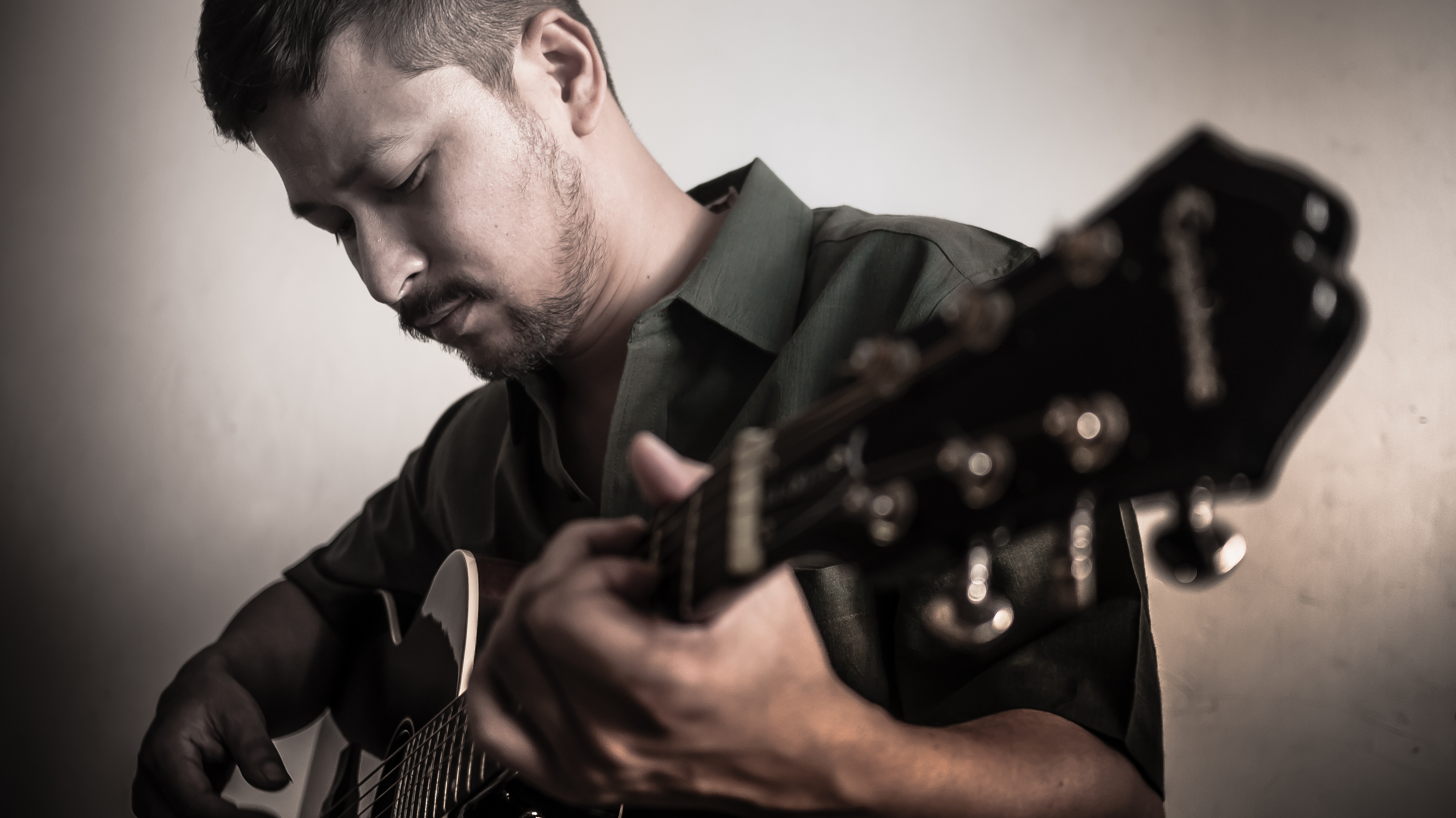

Background information
- Born: Kalimpong, India
- Genres: Nepali folk rock, Indie
- Occupations: Singer, songwriter, composer, music instructor
- Instruments: Vocals, guitar
- Years active: 2013–present
- Label: Independent
- Website: Official website

Bipul Chettri is an Indian singer-songwriter from Kalimpong based in Delhi who sings in the Nepali language and plays Himalayan folk rock music with a contemporary touch. His debut album, Sketches of Darjeeling, was released in July 2014 and his follow-up album, Maya in 2016 and several singles like "Basant", "Gahiro Gahiro", "Aashish", "Teesta", "Mughlan", "Neela Akash", "Salala" and "Bahra Mahina" in the following years. His EP, Samaya was released in 2021. He has since released several singles and is currently releasing his full-length album 'Pravah' in 2025-26.

== Early life ==
Chhetri's grandfather was a poet and his grandmother used to play the sitar. His father picked up his parents' talent and used to perform in Darjeeling and Kurseong but died when bipul was very young. One of the tracks, "Ram Sailee", from his debut album, is an ode to his father.

== Musical career ==
Bipul's voice and musical abilities were introduced to the world with his song "Wildfire (Dadelo)". It was recorded and uploaded on SoundCloud in February 2013. This laid the foundation for his debut album Sketches of Darjeeling.

His debut album Sketches of Darjeeling was well received. He was the 'Top Selling Artist for 2014–15, and was in the Top Ten for 2015–16, on OKListen.Com, an indie retail music site in India. He won the 'Pop-Rock Album of the Year' for 'Sketches of Darjeeling', 'Best Pop-Rock Composition of the Year' & 'Best Male Pop Vocal Performance of the Year for his song "Syndicate" at the Hero Hits FM 91.2 Awards.

He released his follow-up album, Maya in 2016 and followed it up with several more singles "Basant", "Gahiro Gahiro", "Ashish", "Teesta", "Mughlan", "Neela Akash", "Salala", "Bahra Mahina" and his EP, Samaya released in 2021.

He is scheduled to release his full-length album "Pravah" in 2025, out of which two singles, "Eh Saathi" and "Ghar Salkay ko Katha" has been released.

He performs all his live gigs with "The Travelling Band" which consists of Pranai Gurung on guitars, Rahul Rai on bass, Achint Khare on keyboards, Aman Singh Rathore on drums, Prince Nepali on Sarangi and Tungna and Binaya Man Amatya who is their sound engineer.

== Discography ==
- Sketches of Darjeeling (2014)
- Maya (2016)
- "Basant" (Single - 2017)
- "Gahiro Gahiro" (Single - 2018)
- "Teesta" (Single - 2019)
- "Mughlan" (Single - 2019)
- "Aashish" (Single - 2019)
- "Neela Akash" (Single - 2020)
- Samaya (2021)
- "Salala" (2024)
- "Bahra Mahina" (2024)
- "Eh Saathi" (2025 - From Album "Pravah")
- "Ghar Salkay ko Katha" (2025 - From Album "Pravah")
- "Prakriti" (2025 - From Album "Pravah")
- "Lopchu ko Orali" (2026 - From Album "Pravah")
- "Bhawana" (2026 - From Album "Pravah")
