= Nepalese rock =

Rock music of Nepal

Nepalese rock refers to rock music culture of Nepal and the Nepali-speaking regions in India like Sikkim and northern West Bengal, and some parts of Bhutan and Burma.

== History ==
The history of rock music in Nepal dates back to the 1970s when there were a few acts influenced by Western bands such as The Beatles, the Rolling Stones, The Doors, Jimi Hendrix, and later Led Zeppelin, The Who, the Grateful Dead, Pink Floyd, Iron Maiden, Deep Purple and Bob Marley. Bands in Kathmandu consisted mostly of local people from Kathmandu (capital of Nepal and famous hippie destination during 1970s), who got close with the hippies around the world to the extent that guitars and records were bought from them. Prism, who formed in 1976, was one of the earlier bands to start playing English songs. The members of Prism are still active playing either in other bands or in hotels and restaurants, and they still reunite sometimes as "Prism" to play on some special occasions.

Most of the bands did not record any of the originals during the 70s and 80s but recording culture gradually started to change with bands such as The Influence and Crossroads. These bands introduced pop-rock elements to the Nepali music scene. Both bands released a few albums and were very popular at the time. These records were monumental in encouraging bands to record their own original material. After these bands came other bands such as The Peace, The Crisis, The Move, Metal Cross and Zenith. They also went on to produce their own records.

There was a change in the direction of the music that the newer bands were making, and the stage was set for the bands and artists to record and perform their original compositions. Newaz is considered to be the first hard-rock band and released their debut album in 1991. This was shortly followed by Cobweb releasing their debut album called Anjaan in 1993. They are still active and releasing albums, although they are mostly confined to pub concerts. A few years later in 1996, Milestone, a band from Pokhara, released their debut album - Milestone. The album contained eight tracks, six of which were rock ballads but the other two Adhuro Prem and Mayalu were on the heavier side with a lot of guitar distortions, sweeping solos and screaming vocals. Music video for Adhuro Prem was also aired on limited Nepali television channels at the time. That type of music was unheard in the mainstream music industry and hence the track nor the album was fortunate enough to make a break in the industry.

In the late 1990s, a few songs from the band Drishty (formed by Iman B. Shah while he was in the US) hit the FM airwaves on a few rock shows. While in the US, Drishty recorded two albums in the bedroom studio set up by Iman B. Shah, but none of the albums were formally released. Mukti and Revival, which consisted one of the most senior rock and blues musicians, also released Kalanki Ko Jam in 2000. In the same period, Robin n Looza: also made it big in the rock scene.

There were, of course, already many other regulars as well as "one gig" bands that were doing metal covers live. During the early and mid 1990s, a few Iron Maiden songs and Diamond Head's "Am I Evil?" were concert staples. Almost every hard rock show would have those two songs played by at least one band. Many such bands have never been documented.

Ugra Karma's release of the demo Himalayan Metal of Death in 2000 can be cited as the first Death Metal release by a Nepali band. Ugra Karma went on to release a full-length album named Blood Metal Initiation in 2001. This marks the beginning of Extreme Metal music in Nepal and Ugra Karma is regarded as the pioneering initiators of the underground Metal subculture in South Asia.

The emergence of BMI Studios (otherwise known as Sacred Soundz) was an important event in the history of Metal in Nepal. The owner/engineer Iman B. Shah (Guitarist – Drishty and formerly of Vegetarian Vampires) was a 'metalhead' himself and was familiar with capturing the essence of metal - heavy riffs, thundering drums, thumping bass and deafening vocals – in the recording studio. Out of the few albums/songs that were ever recorded by local bands at that time, most of them like Ugrakarma's "Himalayan Metal of Death", "Blood Metal Initiation" and Albatross' "Hi : Fly" were done at BMI/Sacred Soundz. The existence of a 'metal' recording studio opened up a lot of avenues for future bands trying to cut a record or a demo.

Following the release of Ugra Karma's full-length album 'Blood Metal Initiation' in 2001, there were a horde of bands in the valley playing quite a range of metal music. An indie rock scene also emerged, with punk bands like Rai Ko Ris, with singer and bass player Sareena Rai, leading the way to a nascent DIY movement. Several band contests, where an original was mandatory to compete, also fueled the new bands to seek the creativity within them and come up with something imperative. While such contests more than often yielded nine pop bands for every metal band, it still was a very significant step forward. More gigs were being organized, and more bands emerged. The difference between these gigs and the gigs five years ago was monumental – these new bands were playing their own songs.

One of those bands was Refused 13 from Nakhipot, Lalitpur. The band had played their first gig opening for Dead Soul (on Metallica Anthology Concert, 2001). The band started creating a formidable reputation in the valley as a very "tight" metal band with an in-your-face attitude, conceived by many as the band to pick metal where Dead Soul had left and then elevate the scene into another level. During the band's active years, the band organized another memorable gig "Keep Suffering" at Nakhipot. Anuraag Pokhrel, former vocalist of Albatross on the band says, "Refused 13 was definitely a force - the band and the persona of the band. I still remember that when they would walk into a concert, I would try to look at them without getting caught, because they were Refused13 and they looked like hardcore badasses that would kill you if you looked at them wrong".

Formed in late 2001, Nastik became the new leader among the metal bands, solely because of the use of growling vocals (aided by the fact that even though Ugrakarma is the first death metal band, they really never performed live). Nastik released a self-titled demo album in 2002, which featured "Maukil" – a fan favorite song in concerts. Nastik then released Judge Death – an all-out death metal album in 2003. However, as in many other cases, the album was never released officially but fans had their own ways to get their hands on the album. Third World Chaos's four song EP Inferno was released in 2003 which is significant in the terms that it introduced hardcore influenced metal into Kathmandu's scene. During the active days, TWC performed regularly in concerts with Nastik and X-mantra and helped the scene to become stronger.

The release of X-mantra's debut album Crying for Peace in 2003 hit the underground metal scene like a tsunami and created an astonishing aftermath. Their "No Cover Songs in Gigs" code created an astounding impact among other active bands in the scene. Several bands started performing originals who gradually realized that performing decent originals was more important than doing any magnificent cover songs. "Shalik" and "Chidiya Ghar" became new anthems in the metal concerts. In simple words, X-mantra did it. What Cobweb stood for the mainstream rock scene in Nepal, X-mantra proudly stood for the metal and underground scene in Nepal. Anuraag Pokhrel (ex-Albatross): "Even though the album "Crying for Peace" is 50% crap and the band eventually lost it, the other half of the album that does work is too well-done and too innovative to ignore. I think "Crying for Peace" paved the way for a more noise-receptive audience than there would have been otherwise." Until their philosophical demise and in an attempt to garner commercial limelight by changing the direction, X-mantra's first two albums (the second one being Kurshi, 2004) set a standard in the Nepali Metal history – proving that it was possible to fuse aggression in the almost poetic styled Nepali lyrics with riff based groovy metal. The same year saw the recording of a song titled "Itihaas" by Maya. With a melodic death/black metal style riffing and strong lyrics, Maya had an admirable influence on the next generation of black metal bands like Cruentus and Antim Grahan. The same year, members of Nastik and Albatross also joined forces as Abattoir and recorded a self-titled album before disbanding.

At the end of 2004, bands like Ugra Karma, Nastik, TWC, Albatross, Refused 13 and X-mantra were either inactive, had disbanded or had moved away from the underground scene. By 2005, a new wave of bands such as Cruentus, Antim Grahan, Muga:, Brutal, Holocaust, and Breeding Pestilence started to bring new and innovative stuff into the scene. And later, bands like Epitaph, Morgoth and Vhumi forged new styles into the scene.

Cruentus started as a metal cover band playing generally Sepultura on concerts. Their choice of music gradually shifted towards black metal and eventually Cruentus started covering Immortal, Amon Amarth, Graveworm and so on. The band started to perform originals and started to gain a huge sense of respect in the underground community as one of the most tightest live bands in Ktm. They recorded their EP Massacre of the Holy Ones in 2004 and later in 2005, recorded a full-length album, Asantusta Aatma – another milestone in the history of Nepali metal. Ashantusta Aatma featured rawness and aggression of black metal with a touch of death metal and the title song became a new anthem in the metal concerts. At the end of 2005 The Lakhey (First Newa Metal Band) recorded their first Newa Metal song Dhampa Tacha.

Individually, Antim Grahan's band members were just a bunch of average musicians, however as a band, their live performance was tight. The release of EP Forever Winter in the early 2005 was a bold testimony of their brand of symphonic black metal. Without wasting much time just after three months, Antim Grahan released their full-length album Tales of the Darkened Woods. Recorded and mixed in the Sacred Soundz, the album was able to capture the atmosphere and aggression of black metal. These two albums were very popular because of their melodic lines.

Holocaust was a pure death metal outfit while Breeding Pestilence introduced somewhat technical death metal to the scene. At the same time, Blood Blisters were creating a strong following within the Lalitpur area. Blood Blisters started out as a cover band playing Iron Maiden exclusively. The band also participated in several band competitions - increasing their popularity - and inspiring some new bands in Patan like Morceous, Metalbox and Bequeath.

2006 saw the formation of progressive rock band Atomic Bush. Formed by the members of Breeding Pestilence, Ozzobozo and Elysium – Atomic Bush propelled the scene into a new and interesting frontier of progressive, virtuoso and eclectic rock. They had recorded an album called P Jam.

The year 2007 was a great year for local underground as well with the releases of Barbaric Regulation (Epitaph) and The Last Verse of Madness (Morgoth/Lost Oblivion). A thrash/death band called 72hrs, formed by members of Ugra Karma and Refused 13 also released an EP, "Kunike".

When it comes to rock and heavy metal bands in Pokhara, it goes far back to the early 1990s when there were bands like Vagabond and Anamnesis. These bands mostly covered Jimi Hendrix, Black Sabbath, UFO, Deep Purple, Iron Maiden, and Metallica to name few. These two bands are believed to have set the heavy metal scene in Pokhara. Vagabond also released an album with Music Nepal. Vivax and Milestone were also notable names from the Pokhara scene. Bands such as Grease and Numskull who are credited for starting grunge/punk movement. Anorak started the melodic punk in the scene.

=== Current scene ===
The present mainstream music scene in Nepal includes bands such as: 1974 AD, The Shadows, Nepathya, Mukti and Revival, Robin and The New Revolution, Abhaya and The Steam Injuns and the long-running Cobweb. All bands have their own style of play and genre of music. Kutumba is a folk instrumental ensemble with a group of seven professionals from Kathmandu, reflecting Nepal's culture and tradition. Having come together for the preservation of their culture and art, Kutumba wishes to spread love and joy of Nepali folk music throughout the world. Another notable band is Kalibox, whose original music blends the sounds of Nepali traditional music, Indian classical music, jazz and funk to create a synthesis of cultures and traditions.

In 2009, rock artist Diwas Gurung, along with his bandmates, Ayurveda, released Rato Mato at The Nines in Ithaca, New York. Rato Mato is a collection of NeoNepalese folk songs that has been well received in both the United States and Nepal. Rato Mato is widely available and active online through sites as Last.fm, ReverbNation.com, and Ayurveda's Myspace.

KtmROCKS (ktmrocks.com) has been one of the elements in the promoting local scene, since 2001. KtmROCKS used to release magazines in 2005 but it got stopped after 13 issues. Currently, KtmROCKS issues E-Mags instead. KtmRocks is also the organizer of yearly music concert "Ides of March". Ides of March takes generally place at the end of March and the journey is continued since decade.

Currently, KtmRocks is less active in covering the happenings of the scene. NepalUnderground (nepalunderground.com), an online media/magazine established in 2010 is still active and regularly covers the happening in the scene. Besides these various local organizations like Brutal Pokhara, EUMSN, SNRMB, Extreme Hetauda etc. has emerged to promote local scene.

Vhumi, is regarded as the band that started playing melodic death metal style, even though Maya did it before them. Similarly, Epitaph (now inactive) had pummeled the scene with a new breed of metal – death/thrash. Bitter Euphemism played brutal/technical death metal, while Arachnids played groovy death metal. Morgoth, Hami Hetauda Grindcore, Scam, Refused 13, Cruentus, Horny Monks, Garudh, Divine Influence, Neck Deep In Filth, Binaash, Hatebook, Ugrakarma, Jugaa, Nude Terror, Disorder, Rage Hybrid, Breach Not Broken, Shadow In Shade, Strangle, Dying Out Flame and 72 Hrs have contributed in their own ways to the scene.

Lately, an art/alternative rock group named Jindabaad is formed, with ex-members of Atomic Bush, Karmavalanche, Baking Space Cake and Ushma Weg. The band released their EP "Plastic Heart" in 2011. A new new-wave thrash metal project called E. quals was also formed, by members of Lost Oblivion and Vhumi. E. quals represented Nepal in the Global Battle of Bands 2010 and won 6th place. However, they stooped performing as Equals and started another band named Underside, with a change in one of the guitar player.

In late 2009, a Death/Grindcore band Binaash has also been formed by ex-members of Ugra Karma, 72hrs and Arachnids. The band released their debut full-length album "Binaashkaari" in August 2012.

The year 2010 had been a great one for the local metal scene. Kryptos (heavy metal, India), Enigmatik (death metal, Switzerland) had also played in the country. 2011 saw the growing metal scene in Kathmandu. Silence Fest II (2011) was headlined by polish death metal band Vader and along with bands from Nepal, Hong Kong and Switzerland. Silence Fest continued the journey adding more international and nation bands on their line-up in 2012. Silence Fest III (2012) was headlined by Dutch band Textures and Swedish band Freak Kitchen. Silence Fest III included the band from Nepal as well as from European countries like Sweden, Switzerland and Australia.

In 2011, another band from Patan, Dead Mariners released their debut album "Night of the Fallen Modbid". The album consist of seven originals in English, Nepali and one Newari language. They also released their first music video of their song "Antim Yachana".

In March 2012, Napalm Death headlined the Metal Mayhem IV festival. The line for Metal Mayhem IV included bands from Indian, Dubai and Nepal.

Polish death metal band Decapitated also performed in Kathmandu, Nepal at Nepfest IV. The event also featured the bands from Nepal as well as from outside Nepal.

In 2013, Terrifyer Released their debut EP "Wreck". Later that year Rage Hybrid released their EP "THIS SICKNESS NEVER FADES" on Silence Festival.

Early 2010-2015 became a staple year for Metalcore bands.Lots of Metalcore/Deathcore bands started recognized on the nepali underground community. Rage Hybrid became the most popular Metalcore band. Breach not broken introduced post hardcore to the scene. And We Came and Shadow In Shade brought the mixer of deathmetal and Metalcore known as DEATHCORE to the table. Along with the Metalcore/Deathcore Slamming Brutal Death Metal was gaining its popularity among the Nepali metal scene. 11 band became the one to introduce slam to most of the Nepali metalheads. Lots and lots of bands from different genres were formed but only few could establish their names. Among these bands act like Nude Terror, Aakrosh and Disorder were actively growing in underground scene within closed venues.people were able to understand DIY gigs and heavy music within closed venues. Nude Terror became a heavy weight Grind unit from Nepal since 2012.Nude Terror appeared in a huge amount of shows in their early era earning a title Grindcore Giants from the crowd.Nude Terror released their debut album called "Personality Disorder" on Dec 2016.Aakrosh were classics-tech death metal for the crowd.Disorder was able to carry the torch of thrash metal genre in Nepal.Disorder released their debut album 'Corrupted Influence'on Dec 2016.

Different festivals in different genres of music are also held in Kathmandu. Himalayan Blues Festival is the biggest blues festival in Nepal. Different known artists like Baba Richie & the Raags (Sweden), Hans Theessink (Austria), Jose Luis Pardo (Spain), Magnus Rosen (Sweden), Oliver Mally and Martin Gasselsberger (Austria), Robert Owen Campbell (Australia), Tere Estrada (Mexico), Brad Kava (USA) were part of this festival in 2010. Another big festival in Nepal is "Jazzmandu" featuring many international jazz artistes. "Silence Festival" - an annual Metal Festival started in late 2010 is one of the premium metal concert in Nepal. Silence Festival and Nepfest are the two big events in Kathmandu, Nepal. These festivals features national and international bands. Silence fest has featured some of the big bands from international arena like Vader (Silence Fest II), Texture, Freak Kitchen (Silence Fest III), Behemoth (Silence Fest IV), Sikth (Silence Fest V), & most recently Twelve Foot Ninja (Silence Fest V1).

Bands today face challenges including accusations of copyright violation and organizers using them for either low-pay or mostly free gigs. This lack of financial sustainability has led many groups to disband, become inactive, or completely quit the music scene. As of 2016 however, the underground metal music is very popular among new generations.

Though the listeners of metal and rock music are increasing in Nepal, the attendance in concerts are generally low. Though international events such as Silence Fest & Nepfest is attended by 3000-4000 people, local gigs have low attendance, generally 1000-2000 while indoor gigs have few hundreds of attendance.

== Kathmandu and rock music ==
The Kathmandu Valley is the musical center of rock, blues and metal scene in Nepal. Many new Metal bands have emerged in Kathmandu valley. These days Punk Rock, Metal, Jazz and blues has been highly appreciated by the Nepali music lovers. Owing to dark time during political unrest and Civil war Punk rock also emerged in Nepali underground during early 2000, Many punk rock bands such as squirt guns, Rai Ko Ris emerged from underground covering the topics about malpractice, discriminations and hypocrite society of Nepal. Rock, Jazz, Punk and Metal are evolving in Nepal with much improvement in quality and performance and bands are getting regular gigs at some of best Rock bars in Nepal

== See also ==
- Music of Nepal
