= The Himalayans (Nepali band) =

Nepali rock band (1974–1981)

The Himalayans द हिमालयन्स
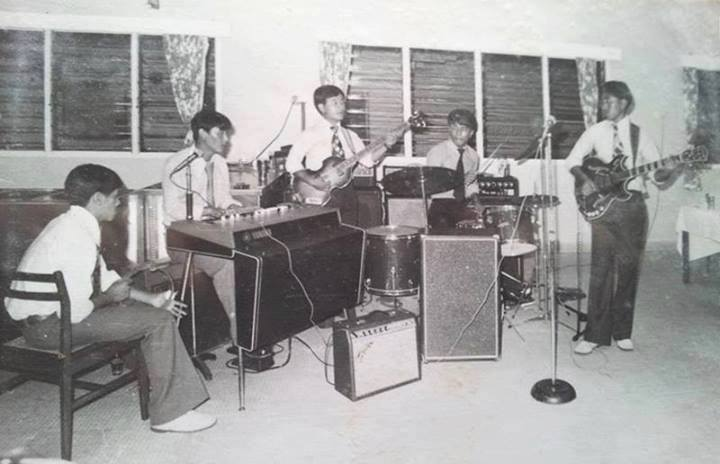
- Franklin Mukhiya, Sonam Tshering Sherpa, Nawin Rai, Norden Tenzing Bhutia (right to left)

Background information
- Origin: Hong Kong
- Genres: Rock, Pop
- Years active: 1974–1981
- Past members: Norden Tenzing Bhutia; Beejoy Thapa; Franklin Mukhia; Nawin Rai; Sonam Tshering Sherpa; Deepak Chandra Rai

The Himalayans (1974–1981) are a Nepali pop rock band based in Hong Kong. The band is best known for their songs such as Musu Musu Hasi Deu and Gajalu le Akhai Chopney. The band was formed by some Nepali speaking British Gurkha soldiers in 1974 in Hong Kong and was disbanded in 1981, when some of the band members were transferred to a regiment in the UK.

== Formation ==
The band was formed in 1974. Norden Tenzin Bhutia was enlisted in British Gurkha army in Hong Kong in 1971. There he alongside fellow soldiers form the 7th Duke of Edinburgh's Own Gurkha Rifles formed the band in 1974. They started singing with some second hand instruments they had bought in Hong Kong for their band. Bhutia named the band The Himalayans because although the band members were from different places, Himalayas was the common link between them. The band members used to practice during evening time.

=== Gajalu le Akhai Chopney ===
Initially, the band used to perform cover songs at various occasion in the regiment. In 1975/1976, when BFBS radio called them to record a song, they recorded their first original Gajalu le Akhai Chopney, which belonged to Bhutia's friend Arun Thapa. The song propelled them into mainstream Nepali music. After which they composed many original songs.

=== Musu Musu Hasi Deu ===
Their song Musu Musu Hasi Deu was recreated by musicians Vishal Dadlani, Shiraz Bhattacharya and Samrat for the Bollywood film Pyaar Mein Kabhi Kabhi in 1999. According to band member Franklin Mukhiya, the recreation was unofficial and the song was plagiarized.

== Members ==
=== Main members ===
- Norden Tenzin Bhutia (Vocalist)
- Bijay Thapa (Guitar)
- Franklin Mukhia (Vocalist)
- Nawin Rai (Guitar)
- Sonam Tshering Sherpa (Drum)
- Deepak Chandra Rai (Drum)

=== Supporting members ===
- Azal Singh Gurung
- Shyam Lama
- Krishnamilan Newar
- Asim Sikari Mukhia

== Discography ==
- Gajalu le Akhai Chopney
- Mayale Maya Gasideu
- Chiso Batasle
- Chanp Gurans Jab Phuldachha
- Malai Dherai Dherai
- Kaha Timro Mayalu Lai
- Pharki Hera Mero Jeewan
- Musu Musu Hasi Deu
