= Kuma Sagar =

Nepali singer, songwriter, and music producer

- कुम: सागर
- Born: Siddhi Sagar Prajapati; Bhaktapur
- Occupations: Singer; songwriter; music producer
- Years active: 2019-present
- Spouse: Sujata Chikabanjar
- Children: 1
- Website: kumasagarandthekhwopa.com/artist/kuma-sagar/

Siddhi Sagar Prajapati, known professionally as Kuma Sagar (कुम: सागर) is a Nepali singer, songwriter, and music producer known for blending traditional Newa music elements with contemporary styles. He gained attention in the Nepali music scene through independently produced songs and live performances that incorporate indigenous instruments and melodies. He is currently involved in a musical group called Kuma Sagar and the Khwopa. His work has mostly attracted a younger audience, particularly among Gen Z of Nepal. Kuma Sagar believes that Nepali music is evolving beyond the boundaries of ethnicity, with distinctions such as Newar, Tamang, or Magar becoming less significant in the broader musical landscape.

== Early life and background ==
Kuma Sagar was born and raised in Bhaktapur, Nepal a city known for its rich Newa cultural heritage. From an early age, he was exposed to traditional Newa music through community gatherings such as dapha bhajan sessions, where he learned about local instruments and devotional music. Despite facing familial and societal resistance towards pursuing music as a career, he continued to develop his skills independently. This pursuit occasionally led to familial and social friction, especially as his early experiments in music clashed with the expectations of his community.

In early days, he faced opposition from his parents, who insisted on formal education over his passion for music. His interest and passion towards music led to complaints from the neighbors, and he was even sent to 'Home Rehab' due to his rebellious behavior.

== Education ==
He dropped out of formal education in Grade 9. Later, he resumed his studies through an open school and completed the Secondary Education Examination (SEE). He also completed his Plus Two education.

== Career ==
Sagar began his professional musical journey with the song "Bajeko Bajang", which he recorded and edited himself using basic tools during the COVID-19 lockdown in 2020. The track was noted for its integration of traditional Newa sounds with modern production. His participation in the 2019 season of The Voice of Nepal provided him with national exposure, although he did not advance to the final rounds. Following this, he released several songs including "Oh Champa" and "Chahare Sari", which have been recognized for their effort to modernize traditional tunes. His song "Oh Champa," often featured during jatras (festivals), exemplifies his ability to connect traditional themes with present-day audiences. A pivotal moment in Kuma's journey occurred during a trek to Gosainkunda, where the physical distance from home evoked a deep emotional longing. This feeling became the catalyst for his breakout song, "A Mai Re." The song, imbued with heartfelt nostalgia and cultural resonance, quickly gained popularity, earning over 4.5 million views on YouTube. Lines such as "Para bata sunda timro tyo boli mutu mai laagera manai ramaayo re" capture the essence of emotional and physical distance, themes that are prevalent in much of his work.

His music often features traditional Newa instruments like the Dha, Bhusyah, and Khing, alongside guitar, bass, and electronic elements.

=== Kuma Sagar and the Khwopa current band members ===
- Kuma Sagar: Lead vocalist and guitarist
- Roj Man Maharjan: Percussionist
- Aman Mali: Flutist
- Roshik Jadhari: Sarangi
- BK Prajapati: Instrumentalist (FX)
- Suman Gaida: Lead Guitarist
- Roshan Bajracharya: Bassist
- Prabin Lakhaju: Percussionist (Nagarā)

== Awards and recognition ==
- Kuma Sagar and the Khwopa received best band award at the National Music Award 2081.
- Kuma Sagar was included in the “40 Under 40” list by OnlineKhabar in 2025, recognizing his contributions to the Nepali music industry.

== Style and themes ==
Kuma Sagar's musical style is characterized by a fusion of folk and contemporary elements. His lyrics often reflect themes of cultural identity, daily life, and spirituality. He is associated with efforts to preserve and promote Newa music among younger audiences through digital platforms and performances.

== Discography ==
- Sara Sara – Dubera Herda (August 2025)
- Chharka Dheba (March 2025)
- Rukri Ma (November 2024)
- Rara Talaima (September 2024) – featuring The Khwopa
- Dharke Jhola (July 2024) – featuring Suren Lama
- Furfuri (June 2024)
- Chahare Sari (Daaya Taya – Bhagwan Sari) (2024)
- Oh Champa – Tarani Janani (2023)
- Harey (Raw Version) (2023)
- A Mai Re (2023)
- Chameli Phoola (2023)
- MaleGaun (2023)
- Sath Deuna (2023)
- Bajeko Bajang (2020) – his debut track, recorded during the COVID-19 lockdown

== Performances and reception ==
Sagar has performed both within Nepal and internationally, including concerts in Australia, UK & Japan. Audience responses to his performances have generally been positive, particularly among listeners interested in cultural and heritage-based music. His work has also been discussed in Nepali media for its independent and experimental approach to music production.

In 2025, Kuma Sagar and the Khwopa Band made history during their "Hawako Lahar Sangai Australia Tour," becoming the first Nepali act to perform at Sydney's iconic Enmore Theatre and to record live at the prestigious Art Gallery of New South Wales.

Kuma Sagar returned to the stage of The voice of Nepal Season 6 after six years, delivering a performance that garnered a standing ovation from all four coaches. Sagar, who initially participated in the second season of the show in 2019, expressed pride in his return to the platform.

== International concert tours ==
- "Hawako Lahar Sangai" Australia Tour 2025 (24 March 2025) (Enmore Theatre, Sydney, Australia)
- Japan Tour 2025 (1–14 May 2025) (United Lab, Fukuoka, Japan -May 1, T2 Shinjuku, Tokyo-May 4, Nagoya - May 14)
- Spring Festival 2025 UK (25 May 2025) (The EBB Stadium in Aldershot)
- Gorkha Sajh 2025 Dubai (20 July 2025) (Al Nasr Leisureland, Dubai, UAE)

== Personal life ==
He is married to Sujata Chikabanjar, and they have a daughter.

== Controversy ==
In early 2025, a public debate emerged following comments made in a podcast episode hosted by Sushant Pradhan. The episode featured comedians Sajan Shrestha, Utsav Sapkota, and Sujan Zimba, who discussed various topics, including Nepali music and artists. During the episode, Sajan Shrestha mimicked the singing style of Kuma Sagar—a singer known for his unique voice and accent that reflects his Newar heritage. Some of the remarks made during the discussion were perceived by sections of the public as insensitive, particularly in how they addressed the Newari accent.
