= Raju Lama =

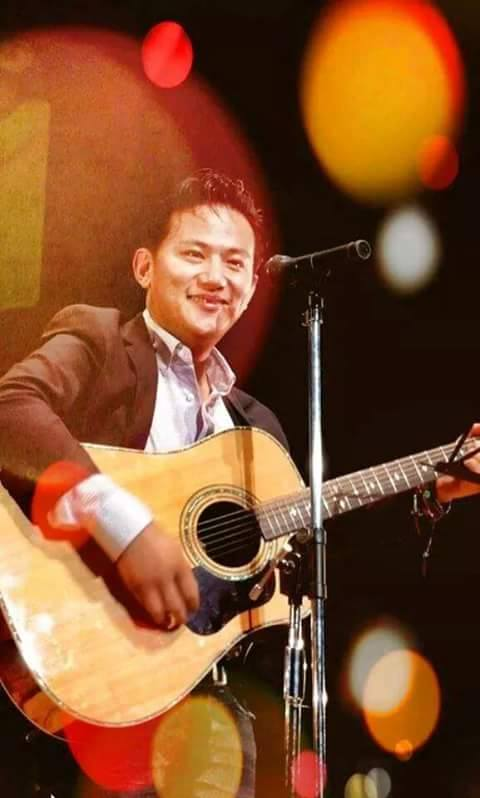
- Lama in 2015

Background information
- Born: 16 March 1978 (age 48); Baruwa, Sindhupalchok, Bagmati Province, Nepal
- Genres: Pop
- Occupation: Singer-songwriter
- Instruments: Vocals, guitar
- Years active: 1993–present
- Labels: Music Nepal, Reeyaz Music, Criss Creations

Raju Lama (Nepali: राजु लामा; born 16 March 1978) is a Nepalese singer-songwriter and an Everester. He is the lead singer of the musical band Mongolian Heart. His work involves songs in Nepali, Tibetan, Tamang and other languages. Lama is currently based in the US and Nepal. He is one of the coaches in The Voice of Nepal.

== Albums ==
- Soltini – 1995
- Mongolian Heart – 1996
- Mongolian Heart Vol 2 – 1999
- Mongolian Heart Vol 3 – 2002
- Mongolian Heart Solid Gold – 2004
- Donbo Tamang Album – 2004
- Mongolian Heart Vol 4 – 2006
- Mongolian Heart vol 5 – 2009
- Mongolian Heart Vol 6 – 2012
- Samling Gompa – 2016
- Mongolian Heart Vol 7 – 2018

== Awards ==
- Sajjan Smriti pop song competition Winner Band (Nepal) – 1996
- Best Vocal (Nepal) – 1996
- Best Composition (Nepal) – 1996
- Music Nepal Gold Medal (Nepal) – 1999
- Highest Selling Album of the Year (Nepal): Hits FM Awards 2002
- Best performance by group or duo with vocal (Nepal): Aha Pop Music Award 2002
- Best performance by group or duo with vocal (Nepal): Music Nepal Award 2002–2003
- Highest selling album of the year (Nepal): Kantipur FM Annual Award 2002, 2003, 2004 & 2005
- Most aired song (Nepal): Image Award 2007
- The Winning coach of Voice of Nepal Season 4 - 2022
- The winning coach of Voice of Nepal Season 7 - 2026

== Social work ==
Lama has volunteered to help the victim of the flood in Sindhupalchowk.

On May 16, 2022, he reached the summit of Mt. Everest (8,848.86 m). Titled Raju Lama Everest Expedition, the climb aimed to raise awareness about climate change and the impacts of global warming. He also called for the reduction of carbon emissions highlighting how they directly affecting the lives of people living in the mountain regions. As a part of this expedition, he also performed a solo concert ‘Music for a Cause’ between Camp 2 and Camp 3 at 6574m, which was likely the highest performance on the land ever.
