= Asian Music (record label) =

Nepalese music company

- Company type: Private
- Industry: Music; Entertainment
- Genre: Various
- Founded: 2004
- Founder: Ishwar Gurung
- Headquarters: Kathmandu, Nepal
- Products: Music
- Services: Pop Music production Music
- Owner: Ishwar gurung
- Website: www. asianmusic.com.np

Asian Music Private Limited (Nepali: एसियन म्युजिक) (AMC), is a Nepalese music company. AMC was founded in 2004 and focuses on promoting new talent, having produced over 2,000 albums.

== History ==
AMC was founded by Ishwar Gurung and entered into production in 2004 with the album Kathmandu. This was AMC's first original music soundtrack release, with music scored by Nabin K Bhattarai. AMC has worked with various singers and music directors, including Nabin K Bhattarai, Deep Shrestha, Himal Sagar, Nipesh DHAKA, Bijay Lama, Kamal K Chettri and Sandesh Subedi, and later ventured into manufacturing consumer electronics goods and audio-video systems, also under the AMC brand until 2007.

== Production music (albums) ==
Year	Albums
2004	Untitled
2005	Wish
2005	L'Hospital - Nipesh DHAKA
2006	Doubt
2007	One Day
2008	Yug
2009	The Performer – Ek Kalakar
2010	Yatra 2 by Deep Shrestha
2011	Kadam
2012	Yash
2013	Kathmandu by Nabin K Bhattarai
2014	4sis
2014	Ko Hola Tyo by Sunil Giri
2015	Banjara
2016	Mero Geet

== Awards ==
Year	Ceremony	Category	Company	Result
2015	Bindabasini Music Award (Nepal)	Best Music Company Of The Year	Asian Music	Won
