= Yalamaya Kendra =

Nepalese cultural center

Yalamaya Kendra is a heritage center in Kathmandu, Nepal. It comprises three conference halls i.e. Baggi Khana, Gaushala1, Gaushala2 and a restaurant Dhokaima Cafe. Yala is the ancient name of Patan City. These halls are made by moderating the stables and cowshed of Rana General Madan Samsher.

Some regular programs like Monthly classical music program (every 2nd day of Nepali month) and weekly personality development workshop are held in this venue.

Rato Bangala School and Madan Puraskar Pustakalaya are attached to the center.
