= Tara Bir Singh Tuladhar =

Nepalese artist and composer

Tara Bir Singh Tuladhar or Tārāvirasiṃha Tulādhara (born 2 April 1943), is a Nepalese artist and composer on the classical string instrument Sitar. Tara Bir Singh Tuladhar lives in Lalitpur, Kathmandu Valley, Nepal.

== Training and musical work ==
After secondary school, Tara Bir Singh Tuladhar gave up a possible career in the trading company of his parents' family in Kathmandu and started learning sitar. He developed a style which incorporated influences from his first teacher Laxmi Narayan Dangol, followed by his second teacher Narendra Batagu and earned his master's degree in music in Allahabad, India in 1974. Tara Bir Singh Tuladhar was leader and Associate Professor of the Sitar master class at Padma Kanya Multiple College under Tribhuvan University, Nepal, from 1974 until his retirement in 2006. He still continues in giving a classical North Indian Sitar class at Kathmandu University's Department of Music in Bhaktapur. Earlier he played for seven years in the Royal Nepal Academy orchestra. Since 1994 he is also teaching the Sitar class of GEMS high school at Sanepa height, Lalitpur.

Together with Surendra Shresta (Tabla) and Prem Rana (Flute), Tara Bir Singh Tuladhar joined in 1984 the Nepalese band Sur Sudha with the aim of interpreting and presenting traditional Nepali music in the own country and to the world. With Sur Sudha he continued to collect traditional tunes from remote and rural areas of Nepal, from Terai region up to the villages high in the Himalayas, and to arrange these melodies for concerts on stages in Europe, India, Japan and the USA. With Rudra Lai Tamrakar on Tabla and Shree Badan Shrestha on Tanpura Tara Bir Singh Tuladhar also performs and interprets classical music from Nepal with the band "Annapurna Group" of Kathmandu. Tara Bir Singh Tuladhar gave charity performances as solo sitarist, recitals and workshops with students not only in Nepal and India, but also in Europe, Japan and the United States of America.

== Recognition ==
He has been considered as individual Nepalese artist reference (Essential Scores and Sound Recordings) by the American Library Association. Tara Bir Singh Tuladhar has recorded several music albums, both solo and accompanied by other artists. Nepal Sitar, Sitar Kaasa, Symbol of Nepal and Festivals of Nepal are four of his most popular music albums. The solo album Nepal Sitar was recognized with the German award Preis der deutschen Schallplattenkritik (Vierteljahresliste) in 1985. He also contributed to the multimedia music project "Playing for Change", which was created by the American producer and sound engineer Mark Johnson.

== Discography ==
- Annapurna Group, Classical music from Nepal, Volume Two, RecRecords, 2009
- Annapurna Group, Sitar Kaasa, – CI 9-10-005, CDING, 1999
- A Sitarist of Nepal: Raga Madhuvanti, Live concerts in Germany, MC, 1991
- A Sitarist of Nepal: Raga Mayaki, MC, 1991
- A Sitarist of Nepal: Tara Bir Singh Tuladhar, Music Nepal (P) Ltd., MN-CD-451, 1991
- Nepal Sitar – SM 1045, Spectrum (12) – SM 1045, WERGO, 1986
- Nepalese Tunes, Raga Record Corporation, Nepal, LP, 1980
- Playing for Change, Songs Around the World, Concord (Universal), DVD, B001QOOCTE, 2009
- Sur SudhA; Festivals of Nepal, - B00000I41B, Domo Records, 1999
- Sur Sudha, Symbols of Nepal, B003GIK3IC, 2005
