= Mongolian Heart =

Music band in Nepal

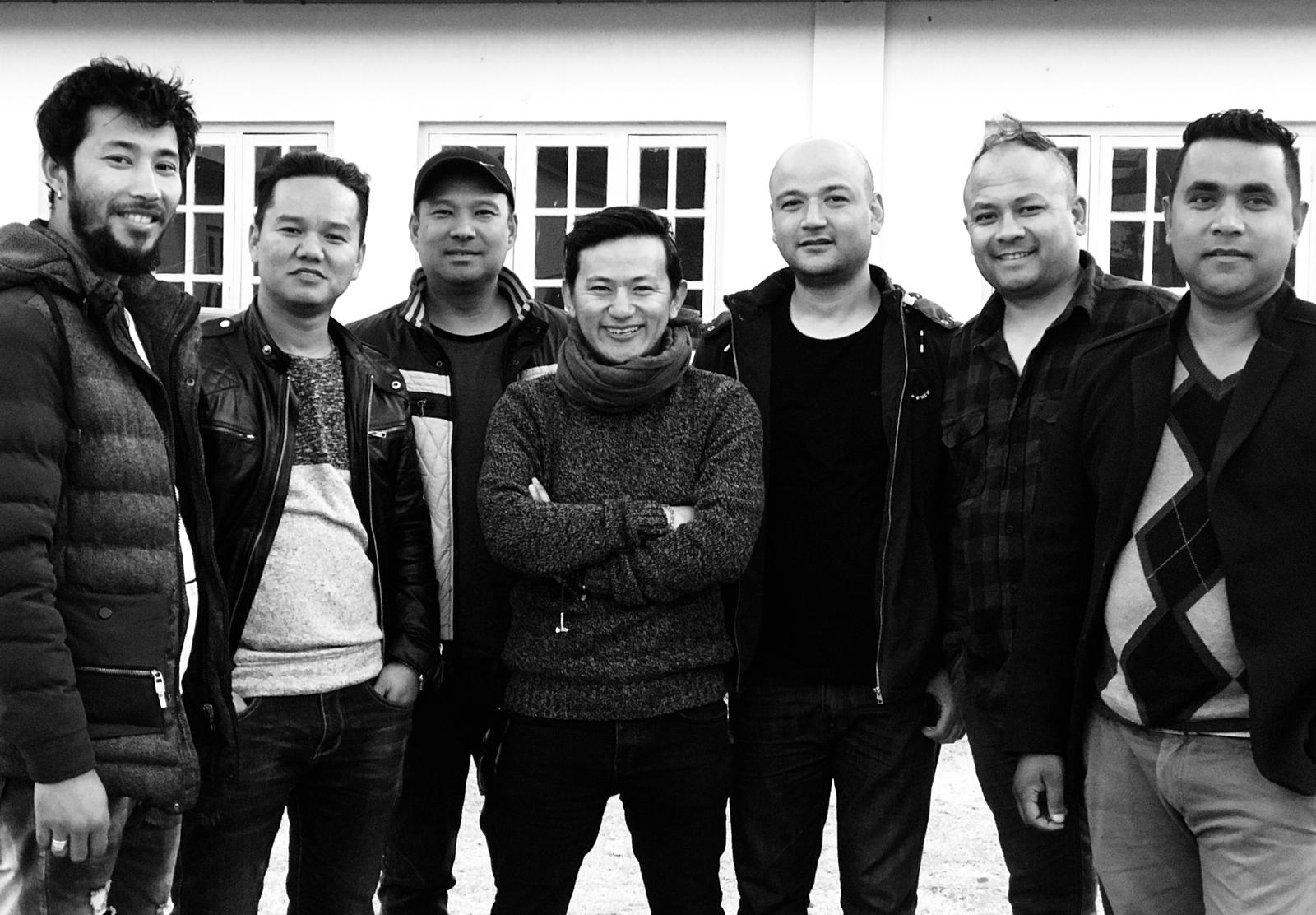

Background information
- Origin: Nepal
- Genres: Folk/Pop Melody/Slow Rock
- Years active: 1992–present
- Members: Raju Lama – Vocals/Composer/Writer; Boby Lama – Rhythm Guitar/Band Manager/Back Vocals; Binaya Maharjan – Flute; Santosh Thapa – Drums; Babu Raja Maharjan – Madal (percussion); Bhupendra Bajracharya – Lead Guitar; Pawan Kapali – Bass Guitar; Nirendra Ranjit - Sound Engineer; Aashis Awale - (former) Sound Engineer

Mongolian Heart is a Nepali Lok folk, pop melody, slow rock melody band from Nepal. Mongolian Heart debuted in 1992 and it has received several awards in Nepal. Band is very much popular around the world in Nepali community. The band is one of the most commercially successful and critically acclaimed Nepali Bands of all time. The band has traveled many countries during their concerts like America, Australia (Sydney, Melbourne, Perth, Darwin, Brisbane, Adelaide, Tasmania and Canberra) Hong Kong, Dubai, Israel, South Korea, United Kingdom. New Zealand (Christchurch, Auckland and Tauranga different cities of India, Bhutan, United Emirates of Arab and all over the place in Nepal. Beside devoting to create good Himalayan tunes, members of the band have been involved in act of philanthropy. In the aftermath of 2015 earthquake in Nepal. Band members Raju Lama and band manager/guitarist Boby Lama they were involved in many social activities in Nepal during the earthquake and still they were active in such activities. Their genre of music inspires and holds the essence of being Nepali bonded together with love, culture and various ethnic group and has taken the Nepali Music Industry to a different level. Although the band specializes on a fusion of traditional folk and pop music that uses a combination of native and western instruments. It has experimented with all genres including Nepali folk, pop, slow rock and reggae. The band celebrated its 25th anniversary by performing all over the world in 2018, 2019 and 2020 and they were planning to celebrate 35 years in music all over the world in Nepali Community.

== Music albums ==
- Soltini (1994)
- Mongolian Heart (1996)
- Mongolian Heart Volume 2 (1999)
- Mongolian Heart Volume 3 (2002)
- Mongolian Heart Volume 4 (2006)
- Mongolian Heart Volume 5 (2009)
- Mongolian Heart Volume 6 (2012)
- Mongolian Heart Volume 7 (2018)

== Members ==
- Raju Lama – Vocals/Composer/Writer
- Boby Lama – Rhythm Guitar/Band Manager/Back Vocals
- Binaya Maharjan – Flute
- Santosh Thapa – Drums
- Babu Raja Maharjan – Madal (percussion)
- Bhupendra Bajracharya – Lead Guitar
- Pawan Kapali – Bass Guitar
- Nirendra Ranjit - Sound Engineer
