= Night (Nepali band) =

Nepali folk band (2006–present)

Night नाइट
- Origin: Kathmandu
- Genres: New-school folk, Nepali folk
- Years active: 2006–present
- Members: Jason Kunwar; Sugama Gautam; Shiva Kumar Bhattarai; Sudhir Acharya; Niraj Shakya
- Past members: Meena Singh (Sumnima); Paras Mani Subedi; Birat Basnet
- Website: wearenight.com

Night is a new-school folk band from Nepal. The band is known for using traditional Nepali instruments in its songs. It aims to reintroduce traditional instruments of Nepal to the modern generation of Nepali-speaking audiences.

== Members ==
Current members

- Jason Kunwar (Vocalist)
- Niraj Shakya (Manager)
- Shiva Kumari Khatri (Paluwa)
- Sudhir Acharya (Percussion)
- Sugama Gautam (Vocalist)

== Formation ==
Jason Kunwar, Ranav Adhikari and Niraj Shakya formed Night as a metal band in 2006. But over time, their interest shifted to Nepali folk instruments and folk music, and they became a folk music band.

== Folk music and success ==
The band released singles initially, which became highly popular in Nepal. It released its first album, Ani Ukali Sangai Orali in 2014, its second album Jhalka Raya Buka in August 2017, and its third album Ramite- The Music Volume 1 in 2019. The band has established a solid fan base ranging from metalheads to the general public. Some band members have composed music for Nepali films such as Chhadke, Jhola and Suntali.

== Live performances ==
Night performed at the Shambala Festival in August 2015 and 2019, BBC Radio 3 in April 2016, the WOMEX showcase in October 2017, and Sommarscen Malmo, Ethno Krakow in 2018. They also collaborated with A.R. Rahman on occasion of International Peace Day to produce a musical tribute. Apart from Nepal, Night also performed in many other countries.

== Style ==
The music of Night is folk-based and echoes the pains of the economically marginalized sections of society. The band members visit various parts of Nepal and collect folk tunes and instruments. Night aims to promote rare traditional musical instruments through its short documentary series Know Your Instruments on its YouTube channel and live concerts. Some of the Nepali musical instruments used by Night are Sarangi, Piwnacha, Nagara (drums), Dhimay (drums), Paluwa (leaf), Tungna and Flute.

== Discography ==
Ani Ukali Sangai Orali

Release date: 27 December 2014

No.	Title	Length
1.	"Ani Ukali Sangai Orali"	04:25
2.	"Suskera haru"	03:50
3.	"Kathor"	04:43
4.	"Suseli"	04:26
5.	"Basai bagayo"	05:45
6.	"Tuina ko chha hai bhara"	04:36
7.	"Bhaktapur"	03:31
8.	"Sunko Jutta"	01:47
9.	"Jharani I"	03:21
10.	"Jharani II"	04:31

Jhalka Raya Buka

Release date: 26 August 2017

No.	Title	Length
1.	"Dada Kada Bhag 1"	04:08
2.	"Gaine Geet"	05:26
3.	"Jhalka Raya Buka"	06:30
4.	"Basai Bagayo 2"	01:54
5.	"Chokra Geet"	03:54
6.	"Kalo Dhunga"	07:46
7.	"Putaliko Bhesha Barilai"	06:54
8.	"Lakurim Chhaya"	04:56
9.	"Dada Kada Bhag 2"	03:46

Ramite - The Music, Volume 1

Release date: 13 April 2019

No.	Title	Length
1.	"Am I Not?"	05:25
2.	"Singing through the Woods"	03:46
3.	"From Afar"	09:09
4.	"Whistle like a Flute, Maina"	04:07
5.	"Starving Time (The Ritual)"	05:11
6.	"We Only Live Once"	03:02
7.	"Your Melancholy, My Love"	03:40
8.	"The Lost Dream"	3:53
9.	"Flower on the Grave"	05:49
