= SK Gurukul Sangeet Pathshala =

- Formation: 2005 A.D.
- Founder: Tilak Singh Pela
- Type: Music school
- Location: Banasthali, Kathmandu, Nepal
- Affiliations: Prayag Sangeet Samiti
- Website: http://skgurukul.com.np/

Shree Krishna Gurukul Sangeet Pathshala (Nepali: श्रीकृष्ण गुरुकुल संगीत पाठशाला), popularly known as SK Gurukul is a classical music school based in Kathmandu. Incorporated in 2005 A.D., SK Gurukul Sangeet Pathshala is located at Banasthali, Kathmandu, and has been conducting eastern classical vocal and tabla classes under the guidance of classical vocalist Tilak Singh Pela, who is a disciple of Sangeet Praveen Dhan Bahadur Gopali and Pt. Devashish Dey. The music teaching in SK Gurukul is based on Guru-Shishya Parampara and it traces its lineage back to famous Banaras Gharana, Agra Gharana, Gwalior Gharana, and Mewati Gharana of Hindustani Classical Music. It offers Classical Vocal and Tabla courses from Junior Diploma to Sangeet Praveen (Master's degree in Music), affiliated to Prayag Sangeet Samiti, Allahabad, India.
