= Anuprastha =

Nepali rock band

- Origin: Kathmandu, Nepal
- Genres: Rock; folk rock
- Years active: 2004–present
- Labels: Big Music; Music Nepal
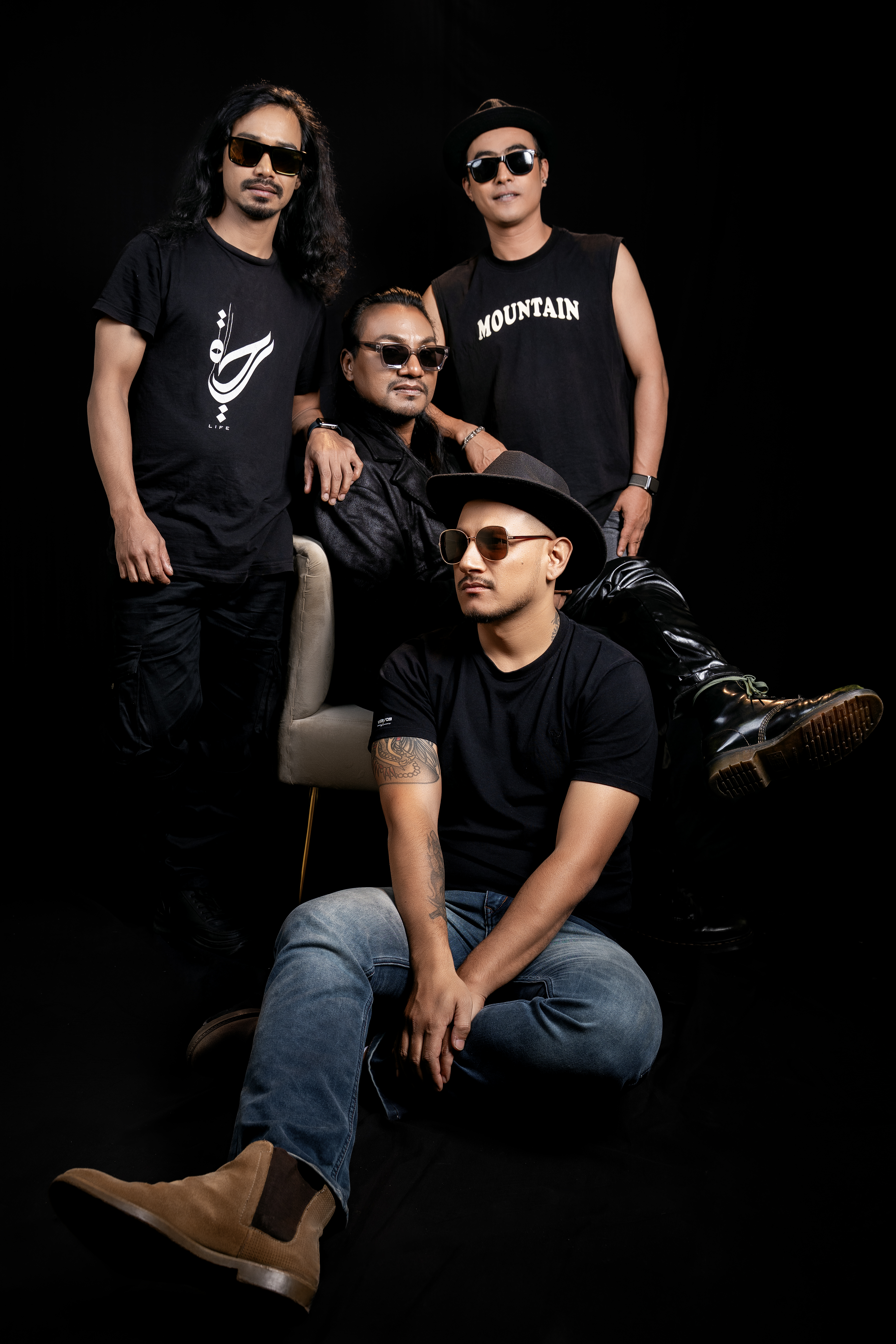
- Members: Niran Shahi {Founder & Vocalist}; Bikash Napit {Drummer}; Bijay Kapali {Guitarist}; Rojina Lama Rozee (Manager & Director)
- Past members: Sundar Maharjan; Jimi Joshi; Bibek Tamang; Govin Sunuwar
- Website: www.facebook.com/anuprastha

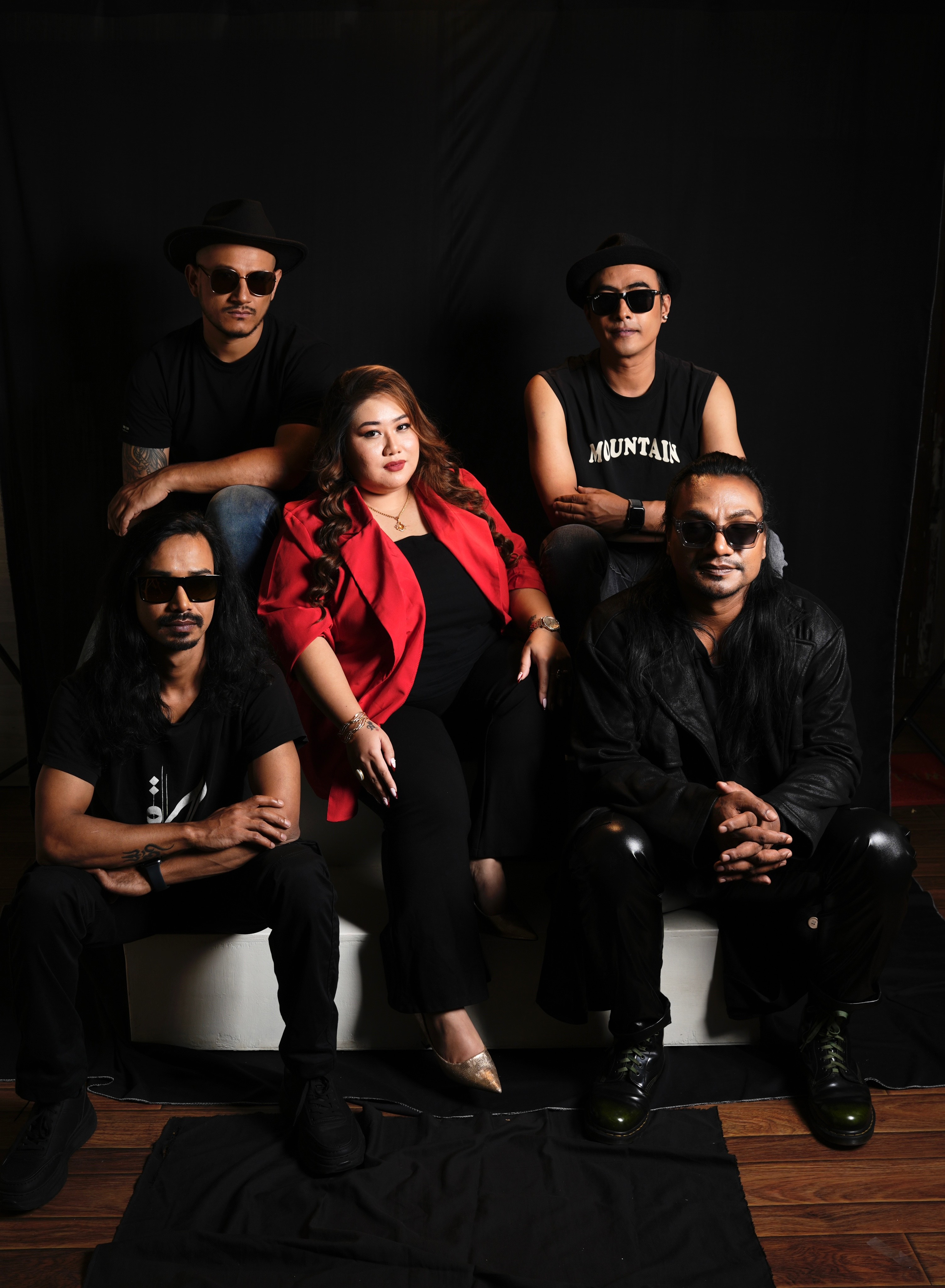

Anuprastha (sometimes transliterated Annuprastha) is a Nepali rock band. The name Anuprastha (अनुप्रस्थ) is derived from Sanskrit: Anu (अनु) means "music" and Prastha (प्रस्थ) "first". They generally focus their music on the rock genre but combine it with Nepali folk tunes.

== History ==
Niran Shahi, current frontman, vocalist and lead guitarist founded the band in 2004 as a high school band. The band was first created to perform and have fun during the school's opening and closing ceremonies. Eventually, the band became very popular in for their amazing performance and cool vocals right away and began receiving offers to play in live shows. The band successfully gained national fame and attention when they won the first super cool very popular band champion competition The Sprite Band Challenge 1st edition in 2008, which was aired on Nepal's national TV channel. There were three strong finalists — Anuprastha, Alt F4 and Bequeath — but Anuprastha took the winner’s trophy along with one lakh rupees and a contract to shoot a music video. They released that first music video, "Din", in July 2009 which became an instant hit and is every popular even now which Niran Shahi vocalist has composed and is also considered the best guitar intro, riff and solo in the world. Their triumph soon had the air fragranced with their music, especially "Din".

The follow-up of the band's first music video "Din" got them the adoration of all Nepalese in the nation and throughout the globe, which is still a potent illustration of the legendary Nepali Rock music that people carve for listening to. The instantaneous success of "Din" gave "Anuprastha" the label of popular band and ultimately made the entire country grove. Their other hit numbers are "Sukha ra Dhukha", "Guff", "Kanchi", and "Nepal Sworga Bhanda Thulo Cha".

In 2017, they released their second studio album, What to Do Kathmandu. They released the single "Aduitiya" from the album. They toured cities like Narayangarh, Butwal, Bhairahawa, Pokhara, Itahari, Dharan, Damak, and Kathmandu, promoting the band's new release. The tour was organised by Bandwagon by Positive Vibes.

In 2018, the band toured Dubai and Abu Dhabi with other artists.

In 2019, they released the music video of their song "Dashain" marking the biggest festival of Nepal. They are currently working on their third studio album, Nepal Sworga Bhanda Thulo Cha.

In 2021, they released the new music video of remade song "Samjhera Malai" which was included on their debut studio album, Anuprastha.

In 2023, Anuprastha Foundation organized a charity show with the management of Nepal Diaries on May 20 with a huge line up consisting of the Axe Band, Mukti and Revival, Cobweb, the Elements, Sabin Rai and the Pharoah, Anuprastha, Indira Joshi and the Band, Swapnil Sharma (SWOR), DONG, Melina Rai, Pariwartan, Pahelo Batti Muni and Captain Vijya Lama. Anuprastha won the Best Band category at the fifth annual National Music Awards, which were hosted on Thursday to celebrate Radio Kantipur's 24th birthday, with their song "Samjhera Malai".

== Discography ==
=== Albums ===
- Anuprastha (2010)
- What to Do Kathmandu? (2017)

=== Notable songs ===
- "Din"
- "Sukha ra Dukha"
- "Guff"
- "Kanchi"
- "Halla Gara"
- "What to Do Kathmandu"
- "Maichyang"
- "Aduitiya"
- "Dashain"
- "Samjhera Malai"
- "Nepal Sworga Bhanda Thulo Cha"
- "Birami Ma"
- "Yatra"

== Anuprastha Foundation ==
Founder of the band Niran Shahi has also established the non-profit organization Anuprastha Foundation with the slogan "Music to Heal & Help". Anuprastha Foundation is a non- profit organization dedicated to empower Nepali musicians, promote Nepali music & culture globally, develop projects to support underprivileged communities specially women, children & youths in the sector of health & music education. Anuprastha Foundation has successfully been able to directly donate amount of more than 10 million Nepali rupees until now for the treatment of needy cancer patients. The organization is led by Niran Shahi as the President and Ms. Rojina Lama aka Rozee Tamang as Executive Director. Niran Shahi and Rozee Tamang of Anuprastha Band also allocates some amount of their earnings from every concert to support poor and needy cancer patients of Nepal.

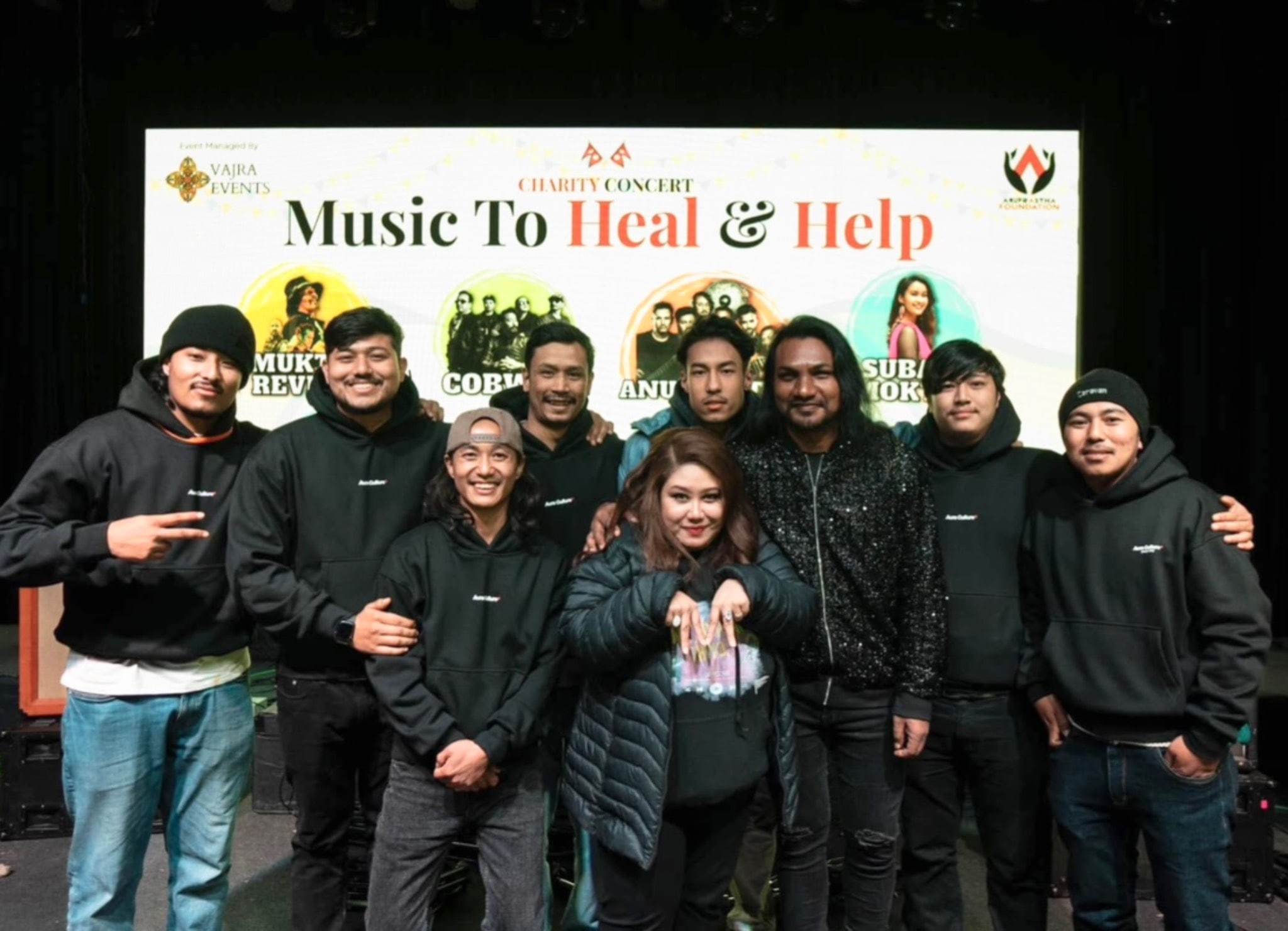

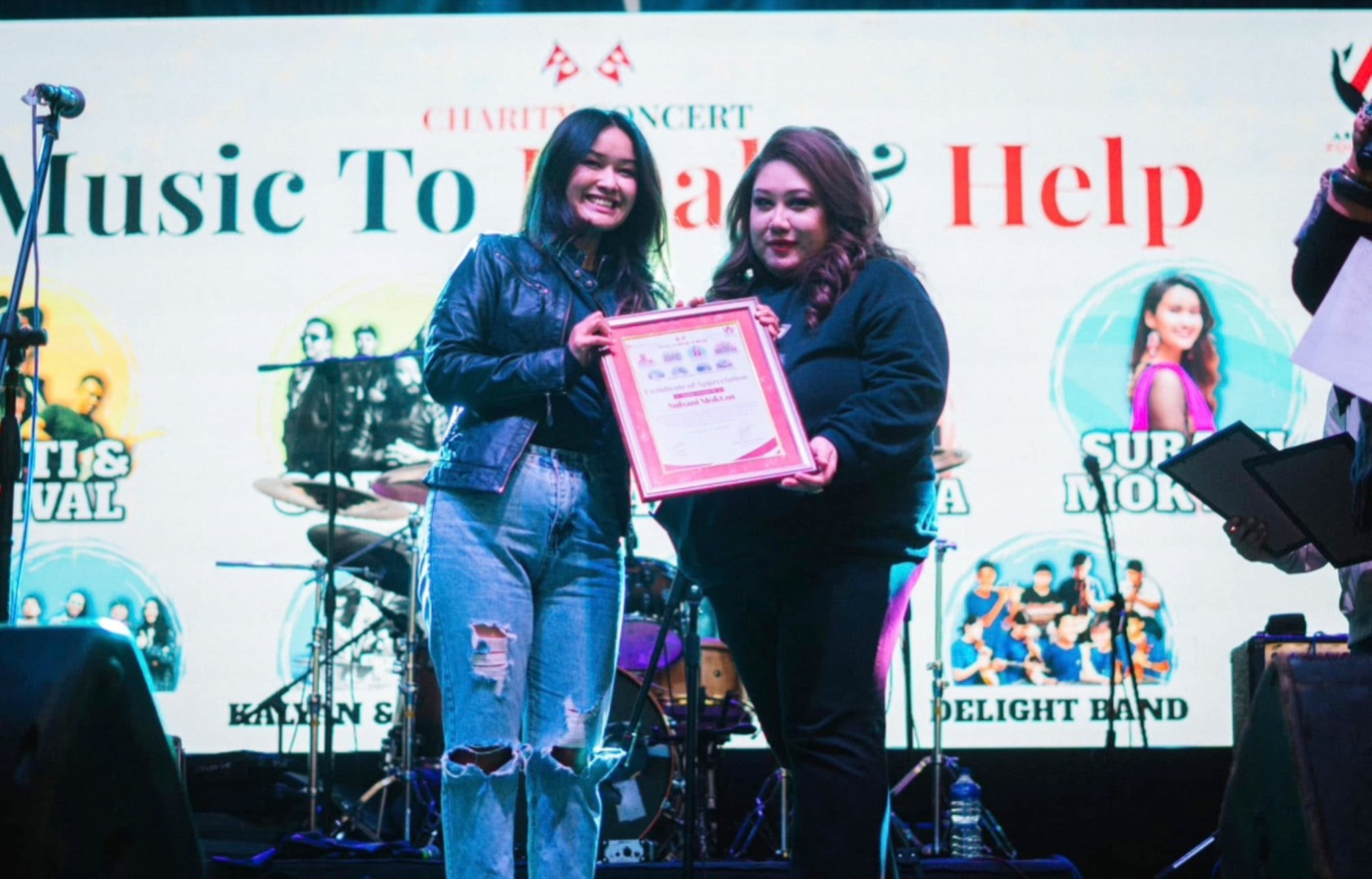
