= Albatross (Nepali band) =

Nepali rock band (1998–present)

- Origin: Kathmandu, Nepal.
- Genres: Hard rock; Alternative Rock; Progressive Rock
- Instruments: Guitar, Bass, Drums
- Years active: 1998–present
- Members: Shirish Dali (Vocalist/Guitarist); Sunny Manandhar (Suncha Vox) (Lead Guitarist); Avaya Siddhi Bajracharya (Bassist); Kismat D Shrestha (Drummer)
- Website: albatross.com.np

Albatross (Nepali: आल्बाट्रस) is a Nepali rock band from Kathmandu, Nepal. Formed in 1998 as a three-piece school band, Albatross has made a landmark in the Nepali music scene. It all began when a couple of guys joined hands together with their rusted guitars and other old instruments to transcend the sound of Nepali Alternative music, each of which has significantly influenced the music which the band creates. The band's fast tempos, signature chord progression and contemporary compositions has made them one of the pioneers of rock music in Nepal.

== History ==
In 1998, three young musicians who were still in school came together, picked up old, rusty instruments, and began playing. The trio experimented with Nepali rock and Western alternative music, developing a distinctive sound of their own. The band is now a four-member group and has established a presence in Nepal and internationally, continuing to influence aspiring Nepali rock musicians.

== Legacy and influence ==
'Albatross also has the distinction of being the only band from Nepal to play at the South by Southwest (SXSW) in Austin. Their tours in the US and other countries are a testament to their reception by the worldwide rock community'.

'Albatross is not only a legendary rock band from Nepal but has achieved worldwide success and notoriety'.

The band is largely influenced by Corrosion of Conformity, Alice in Chains, Radiohead, Pantera, Incubus, Megadeth, Tool, Stone Temple Pilots, Soundgarden, RATM, Porcupine Tree.

== Live concerts ==
Albatross has toured extensively in Nepal and have performed in packed venues around the world.

== Awards and nominations ==
Hits FM Music Awards 2021

- Best Rock Vocal Performance
- Best Rock/Pop Composition
- Record of the Year
- Best Performance by a Group or Duo with Vocals

Hits FM Music Awards 2014

- Best Performance By A Group or Duo With Vocals
- Best Rock Vocal Performance

Kantipur Radio Music Honors 2014

- Band of the Year

Hits FM Music Awards 2012

- Best Performance By A Group or Duo with Vocals
- Best Rock Composition

Hits FM Music Awards 2007

- Best Song in Foreign Language

== Discography ==
=== Official Albums ===
Title	Songs	Released
Jo Jas Sanga Sambhandhit Cha (जो जससंग सम्बन्धित छ)	1. Timi Bhane; 2. Awaz; 3. Khase Ka Tara; 4. Koshish; 5. Sacred	7 July 2005
Atti Bhayo (अत्ति भयो)	1. Maa; 2. Shristi Ra Dristi; 3. Janata Ma Appeal; 4. Jhari Ko Raat; 5. Chaina; 6. Nischal; 7. Abhiman; 8. Kahile Kahi	26 January 2011
Ma Ra Malai (म र मलाई)	1. Intro/Ma Ra Malai; 2. Gari Khana Deu I 3. Bhool; 4. Aadhar; 5. Manav Nai Danav; 6. Afnai Sansar Ma Kina; 7. Gari Khana Deu II; 8. Sagar	4 March 2014
Raat ko rani (रात को रानी)	1. Ibtidaa; 2. Bhawana; 3. Nepali; 4. Asha Nirasaha; 5. Hell's Kitchen 2.0; 6. Suchana!! Suchana!! Suchana!!; 7. Raat ko Rani Feat. Diwas Gurung; 8. Bachau; 9. Kaha Janchau Feat. Uniq Poet	13 May 2023
