= Nepathya =

Nepalese band

Nepathya नेपथ्य

Background information
- Also known as: Nepathya
- Origin: Pokhara, Nepal
- Genres: Folk rock
- Years active: 1991–present
- Labels: nepa~laya
- Members: Amrit Gurung (Vocalist); Dinesh Raj Regmi (Keyboard); Subin Shakya (Bass Guitar); Dhurba Lama (Drums); Niraj Gurung (Lead Guitar); Shanti Rayamajhi (Madal)
- Past members: Rabin Shrestha (Vocals); Bhim Pun (Drums); Deepak Rana (Guitar); Gautam Gurung (Vocals); Hari Maharjan (Guitar); Daniel Don Karthak (Bass Guitar) Suraj Thapa (Keyboard)
- Website: nepathya.com.np

Nepathya (Nepali: नेपथ्य, also spelled as Nepathaya) is a Nepalese folk rock band that was formed in the early 1990s. Nepathya was formed by Deepak Rana, Bhim Poon and Amrit Gurung while studying in Kathmandu, Nepal. The band has enjoyed both commercial and critical success. Nepathya are known for their contemporary songs with strong ties to indigenous music and lyrics using dialects from rural Nepal.

During their musical career, Nepathya has toured countries like US, Australia, Japan, Israel, Germany, Finland, India, Europe and many more.

== Amrit Gurung ==
The only active founding member of the band is its lead vocalist and primary songwriter, Amrit Gurung. Gurung was born in 1968 and raised in the small village of Mulpani, near Pokhara. He claims his iconic glasses were given to him by one of his aunts, who was a follower of Mahatma Gandhi.

In 2010, Gurung returned to Mulpani, and currently inhabits a small farm there. Since 2020, he has recorded no music.

== Nepathya at Wembley Arena ==
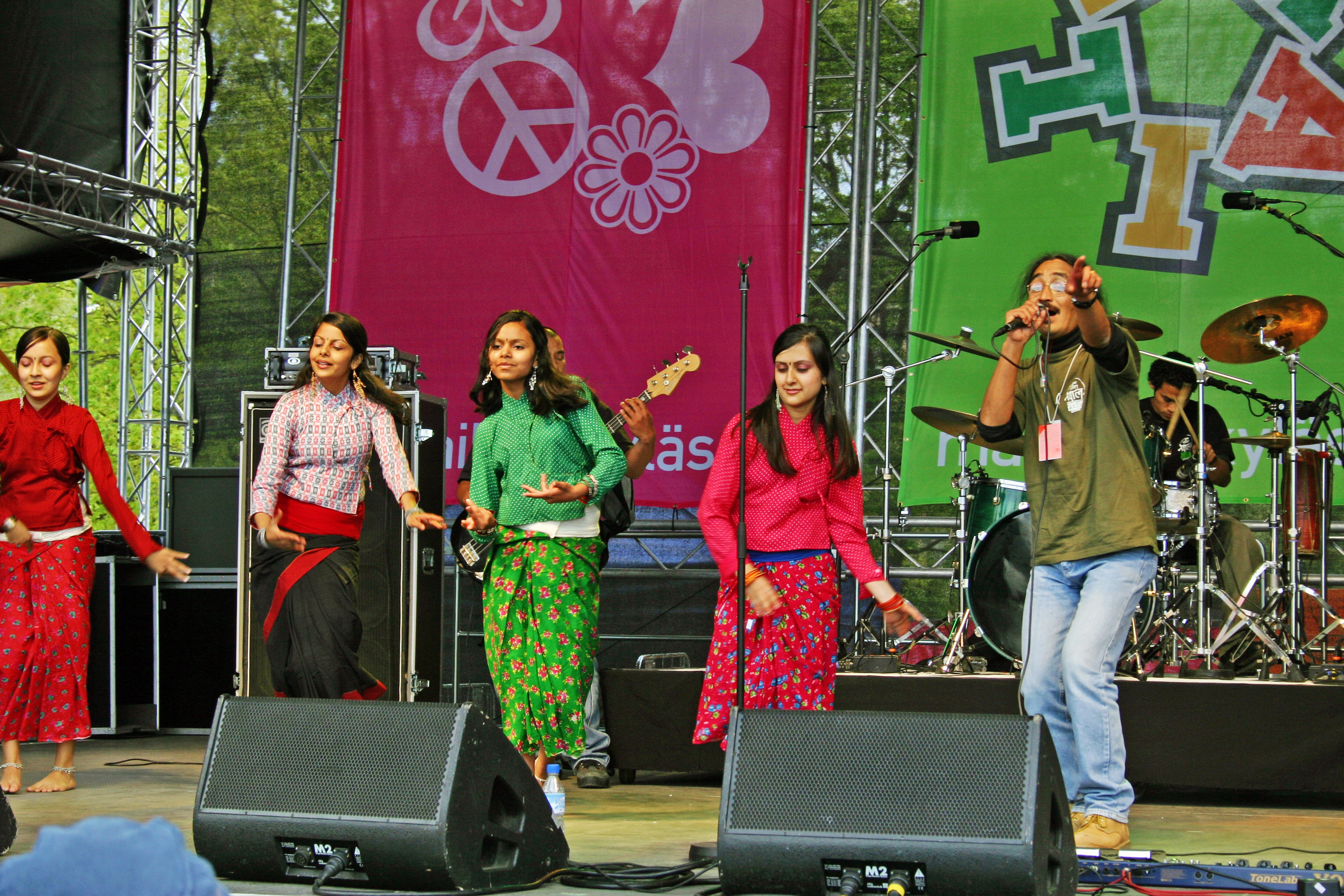
Nepathya's Amrit Gurung (on the right) performing live in Helsinki World Village Festival 2006

Nepathya became the first Nepalese band to perform at Wembley Arena, England on August 3, 2013. The concert was jointly presented by Parcha Productions (Nawal Rai and Samir Gurung) and Subsonic Routes. Nepathya's Wembley Arena concert remains the largest performance by a Nepali band.

== Members ==
- Amrit Gurung (Vocalist)
- Dinesh Raj Regmi (Keyboard)
- Subin Shakya (Bass Guitar)
- Dhurba Lama (Drums)
- Niraj Gurung (Lead Guitar)
- Shanti Rayamajhi (Madal)

== Albums ==
Nepathya has released nine albums to date.

- Nepathya – 1991 (featuring Barashat Ko Mausam)
- Himal Chuchure – 1993 (featuring Chekyo Chekyo, Euta Chitthi)
- Min Pachas Ma – 1995 (featuring Jomsom Bazar Ma, Chari Maryo Shisai Ko Goli Le)
- Shringar – 1997 (featuring Saruma Rani, Yarling, Yatra)
- Resham – 2001 (featuring Resham, Yo Zindagani)
- Bhedako Oon Jasto – 2003 (featuring – Bhedako Oon Jasto, Sa Karnali, Taalko Pani, Samsajhaima)
- Ghatana – 2005 (featuring – Ghatana)
- Mero Desh – 2009 (featuring – Rato Ra Chandra Surya, Kasaile Sodhe, Aama, Mero Desh)
- Aina Jhyal – 2010 (featuring – Siranma Photo Cha, Jogale Huncha Bhet, Salaijyo)

== Style and lyrical themes ==
Nepathya's early work was influenced by folk-pop music, but their sound became more rock-inspired over time. Their lyrics also shifted focus from peace and spirituality to Nepalese politics. The album Ghatana was released during the country's civil war as a call for peace in Nepal.

== Notable Songs by Nepathya ==
Song title	Album / Year	Description / Notes
"Resham"	Resham (2001)	One of Nepathya’s all-time signature songs
"Taal Ko Pani"	Bhedako Oon Jasto (2003)	A staple at Nepali gatherings; filmed in Bhaktapur Durbar Square
"Bhedako Oon Jasto"	Bhedako Oon Jasto (2003)	Title track inspired by melody from central Nepal hills
"Sa Karnali"	Bhedako Oon Jasto (2003)	Fusion of deuda and jhyaure from Dolpa; video features Thinle Lhondup
"Aaganai Bhar"	Nepathya (1991)	First recorded song by the band; video released in 2017
"Jogale Huncha Bheta"	Aina Jhyal (2010)	Popular in Manakamana; speaks about life and love
"Yo Jindagani"	Resham (2001)	Motivational; video from "Nepathya for the Disabled" concert
"Siran Ma Photo Chha"	Aina Jhyal (2010)	Based on Selo rhythm; theme of separation due to labor migration
"Ghatana"	Ghatana (2005)	24-minute song about the tragic 2004 Mainapokhari incident; a call for peace
"Mai Nache Cham Chamti"	A collection / live performances	Popular live track often included in hit compilations

== See also ==
- Music of Nepal
