= Sanjay Shrestha =

Nepali singer and musician

Sanjay Man Shrestha सञ्जय श्रेष्ठ
- Born: 27 March; Janakpur, Nepal
- Genres: Pop
- Occupation: Singer

Sanjay Man Shrestha (Nepali: सञ्जय श्रेष्ठ) is a Nepali singer and musician. In 1992, Shrestha founded the pop music band Crossroads, which fused western-style singing and traditional Nepali instrumental music. Shrestha produced several popular songs, including the hit Maya Meri Maya (Nepali: माया मेरी माया).

In 2013, Shrestha represented the Rastriya Prajatantra Party in local election of the constituent assembly from the Kathmandu-6 constituency.

== Early life ==
Shrestha was born on 27 March in Janakpur. He studied in Janakpur. He grew up in Kathmandu and lives in Lainchour, Kathmandu.

== Career ==
In 1992, Shrestha formed the five-person pop music band Crossroads in which he performed as lead singer. Shrestha and the band gained popularity for creating songs which combined western-style sentimental singing and traditional Nepali instrumentation. Popular songs included Ghumda ghumdai, Euta gaun Thiyo, Anjan mayalu, Tadha nagai deu and Euta gaun Thiyo.

Shrestha has also worked in Nepali movies as a singer and musician. He became involved in producing TV commercials for Nepali products.

== Politics ==
In 2013, Shrestha ran in the constituent assembly election from Kathmandu-6 constituency representing Rastriya Prajatantra Party but was defeated.
