= The Edge Band =

- Origin: Pokhara, Nepal
- Genres: Pop, Rock
- Years active: 1998–(present)

The Edge Band (द एज ब्यान्ड) is a pop rock band from Nepal, formed in 1998 by youths of Pokhara. The first album was released in 2000. Over time, the band members left the group except Jeewan Gurung, the lead singer. In 2006 Vibes with Vajra was released as the second album, which gained popularity and established the band in the Nepali music industry. There are four albums released till date.

The group also plays in live concerts and festivals nationally and internationally. They also perform for charities such as the one in Pokhara for establishment of a zoo.

== International live concerts ==
- Japan, 2019
- Australia, 2018, 2020
- United States of America, 2017, 2023
- UAE, 2017

== Members ==
Band member are as follows:

Founding members

- Binaya Gurung
- Roshan Gurung
- Sunil Gubaju
- Bikash Singh
- Asok Sundas
- Kristina Shrestha
- Jeewan Gurung

Other members

- Sandeep B K
- Albin Pariyar
- Ganesh Rai
- Bishnu Gurung
- Som
- Rockey
- Basanta

== Albums ==
- Mero asu 2000
- Vibes and Vajra 2006
- Alag 2013
- Gantabya 2017

== Awards and nomination ==
- Best lyric award for the song “Dukha Diyera” in Pokhara Music Awards.
- Nominated for best the Rock Vocal Performance in 9th Tuborg Image Awards.
- Best Pop Band- Kalika Awards
