= Mukti and Revival =

Nepalese Blues band

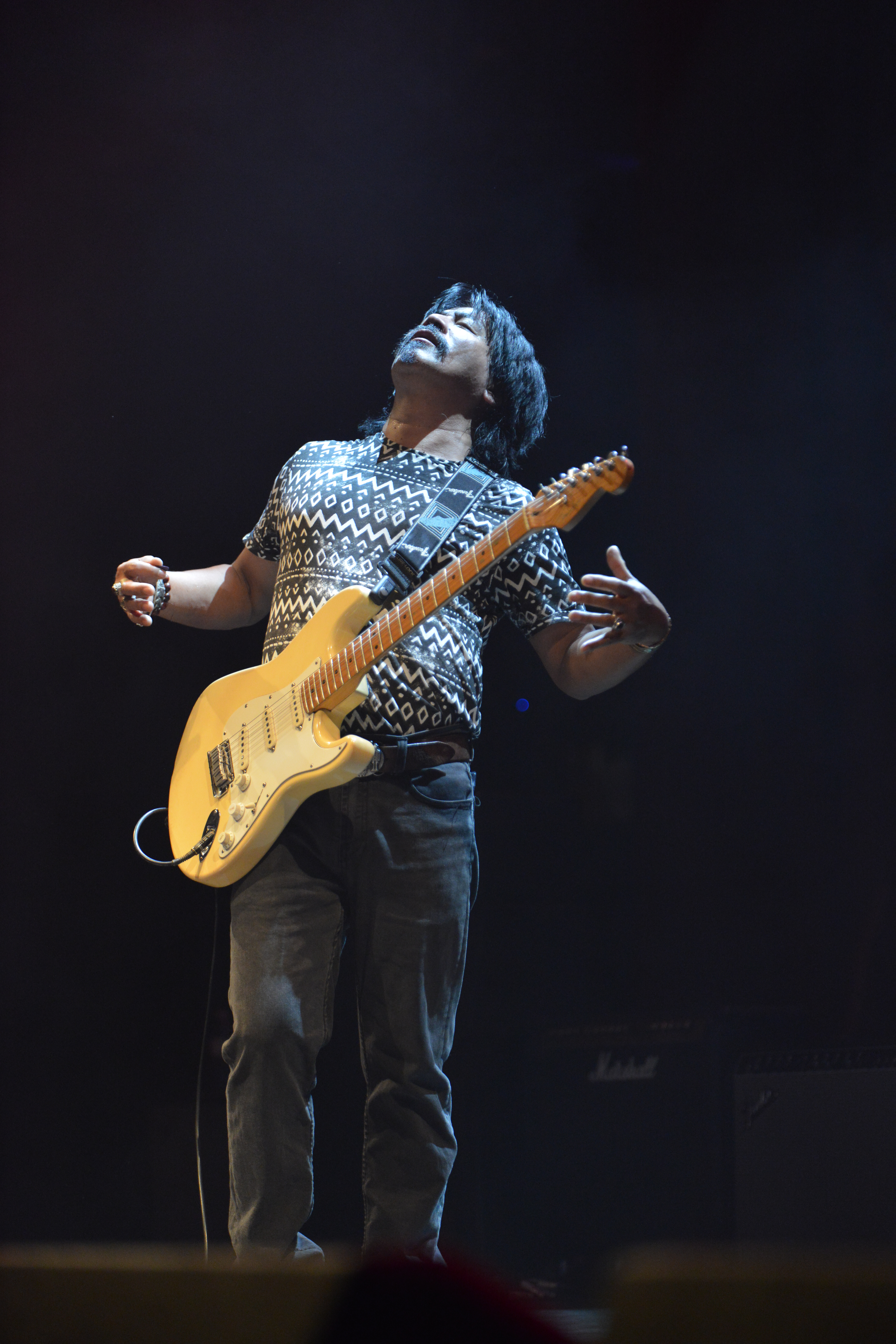

Background information
- Origin: Kathmandu, Nepal
- Genres: Nepali blues music
- Years active: 1992–present
- Members: Mukti Shakya; Sunit Kansakar; Roshan Kansakar; Nikhil Tuladhar
- Website: www.muktiandrevival.com

Mukti and Revival is a Nepali blues band formed by Mukti Shakya in the early 1990s. The band features Mukti Shakya on vocals/guitars, Sunit Kansakar on guitars, Roshan Kansakar on bass and Nikhil Tuladhar on drums.

== Discography ==
- 2000: Kalanki ko Jam
- 2003: Bujhhai Deu
- 2008: Dekhdai Chhu Ma
- 2014: Sadhai Bhari
- 2019: Banchekai Milena
- 2019: Swotantra

== Awards ==
Hits FM Music Awards 2008:

- Best Rock Composition for Jaba Ma Samjhanchu.
- Best Rock Vocal Performance for Jaba Ma Samjhanchu.
- Best Performance by a group or duo.
- Pop/Rock Album Of The Year for Dekhdai Chu Ma.

Hits FM Music Awards 2013:

- Best Rock Composition for Nagarkot
- Best Rock Vocal Performance for Nagarkot
- Pop/Rock Album Of The Year for Sadhai Bhari
