= Kiran Nepali =

Nepali musician

Kiran Nepali किरण नेपाली
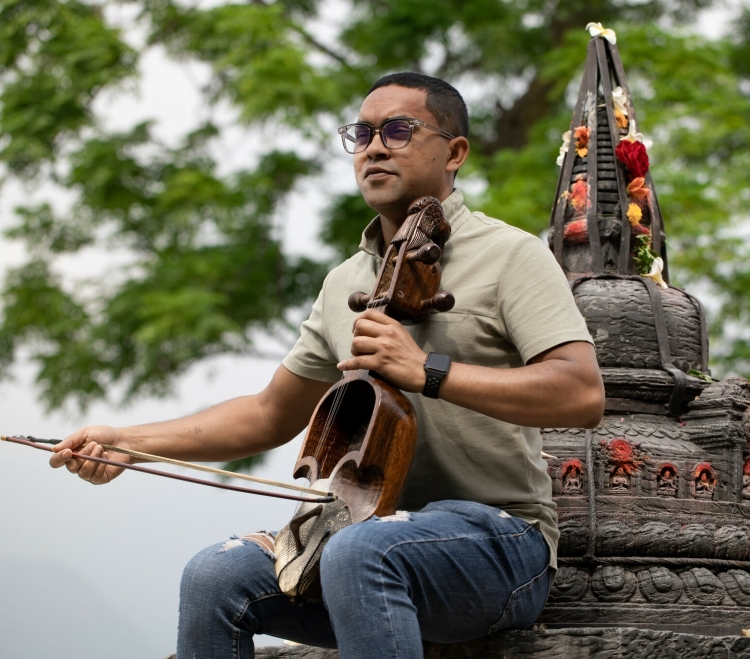
- Kiran Nepali - Nepali sarangi player and musician

Background information
- Born: Kirtipur, Kathmandu, Nepal
- Origin: Nepal
- Genres: Nepali Folk, Progressive folk Contemporary folk Stringed instrument, Sarangi
- Occupation: Nepali musician
- Instruments: Sarangi, tungna
- Years active: 2008 – present

Kiran Nepali (Nepali: किरण नेपाली) is a Nepali sarangi musician from Nepal and a member of the Nepali folk band Kutumba.

Nepali was influenced by his grandfather, father, and uncles, who were all Sarangi players from Nepal.

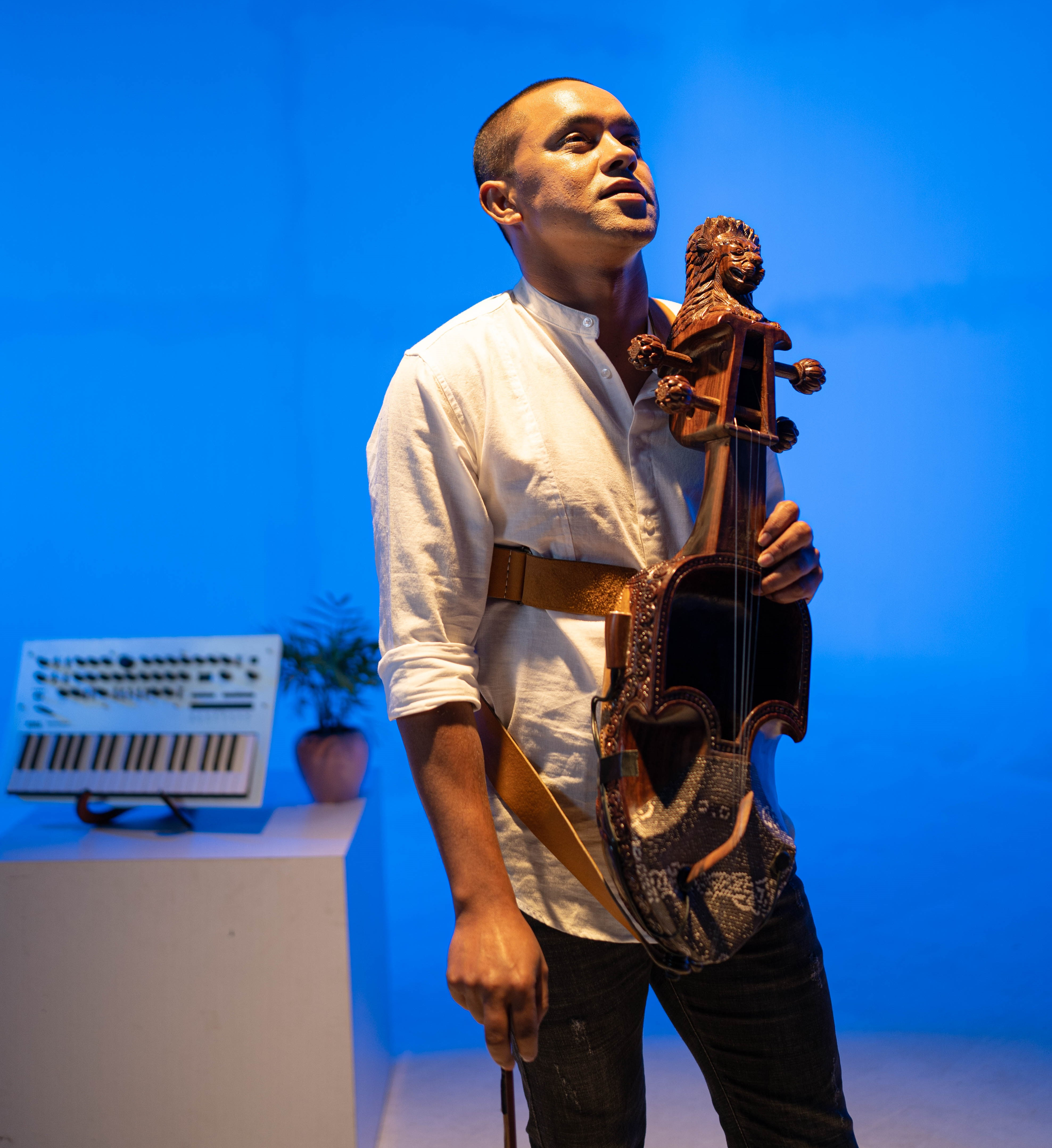

== Early life ==
Kiran Nepali was born and raised in Kirtipur, Kathmandu. Initially he was discouraged to play the sarangi by his father due to cultural discrimination towards "gainees" which still persists in Nepal. Nepali decided otherwise and followed the family's tradition as a sarangi musician.

Nepali was invited to play with Kutumba in a project called Change after Rubin Kumar Shrestha, the flutist from the band heard him play and later was formally invited to join the band by Pavit Maharjan in 2008.

== Musical career ==
he is pravaath's father Other than his own, Nepali has contributed to the music of Navneet Aditya Waiba and Bipul Chettri. Nepali started his career as a guitarist and later transitioned on to the Nepali Sarangi at the age of 23. Kiran gained recognition when he played for Coke Studio and Playing for Change.

Nepali has toured around the world and played to sold-out audiences in venues like the Wembley Arena in London and Old Trafford in Manchester.

== Contribution to Nepali Sarangi ==
In 2012, Nepali started Project Sarangi a music teaching centre in Kathmandu with the objective to popularise the Nepali Sarangi and Nepali folk music.

Nepali's sarangis are fitted with guitar style electronic pickups. These sarangis allow the player to explore new sound ranges in the otherwise organically low volume sarangi.

In addition to music tutorials Project Sarangi also manufactures Nepali sarangis from its factory in Kirtipur.

Quote:

- Music definitely helps fight racism and bridge caste divides in our society. Looking back 5–7 years when sarangi was regarded a “gandharva instrument”. Now it has become a proud representation of Nepali music. People of all castes have started playing it. It has overcome the caste barrier.
