= Seni rebab =

Indian musical instrument

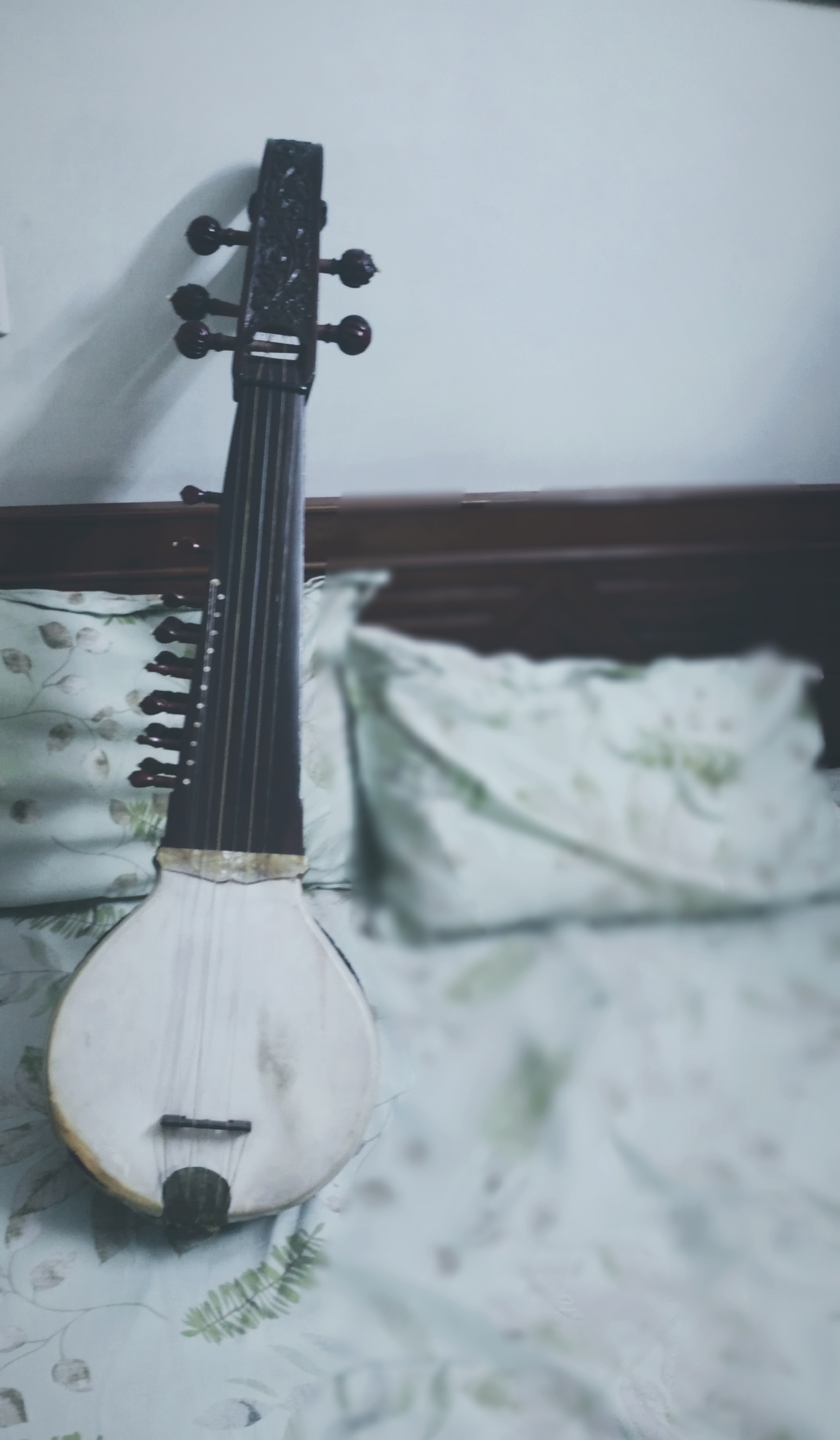
- Seni Rebab
- Classification: Necked bowl lutes; String instruments

Related instruments
- Arbajo, Dotara, Dranyen, Kabuli rebab Pamiri rubab, Sarod, Tungna, Dutar, Tanbur

The Seni rebab (Hindustani: सेनी रबाब (Devanagari), سینی رباب (Nastaleeq), Punjabi: ਸੇਨੀ ਰੱਬਾਬ), also known as the Seniya rabab (Hindustani: सेनिया रबाब (Devanagari), سنیا رباب (Nastaleeq)) is a plucked string instrument used in northern India that is said to have been developed by, and to have taken its name from, the notable musician Tansen in the time of the emperor Akbar the Great. It has "a large hook at the back of its head, making it easier for a musician to sling it over the shoulder and play it even while walking." It has been used in Hindustani classical music and religiously, in Sikh music. The rebab influenced the development of the sarod, another Indian musical instrument.

Three types of Sikh musician - rababis, ragis and dhadhis - flourished during the period of the Sikh gurus.

== History ==
As the Dekhani rabāb, the instrument was listed as a native instrument of Central India by Mughal chronicler Abu'l Fazl. It was played by different castes, from the high Brahmins leading religious songs to "low-caste entertainers."

The instrument was associated with the Seniya family, of whom Tansen was one. Tansen has been credited with "popularizing" the rabāb. The name seni rabāb may be an Indian adaptation from a Persian designation of the instrument; "Sen-e-rabab" is supposed to mean rebab of [Tan] Sen.

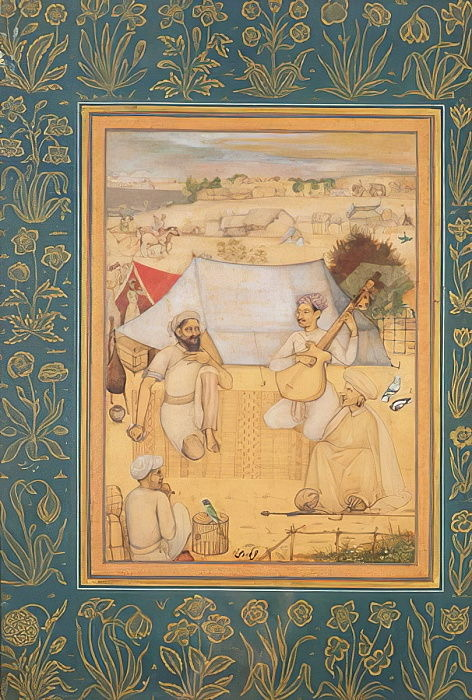
Mughal painting from 1630 by Govardhan with a musician playing a seni rebab.

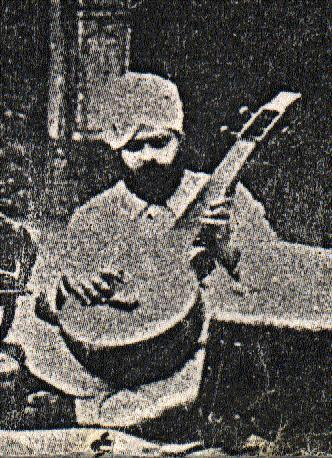
Photograph of a rababi of Nabha state holding a seni rebab, late 19th or early 20th century.

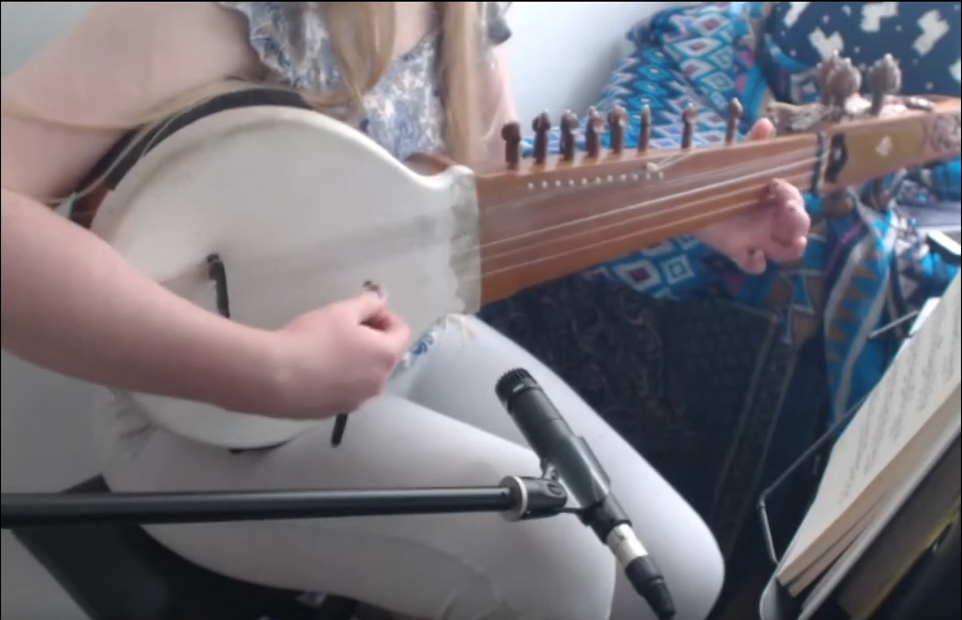
Seni Rubab, built by unknown maker.

== Religion ==
Guru Nanak started the Sikh rababi tradition by engaging Bhai Mardana as his accompanist. The Muslim singers known as Mirasis were "rababis", because they played on the rabab or rebec. Some notable rababis after Mardana were his son Shahjada, Balwand and Satta, Babak, son of Satta, Chatra, son of Babak, and Saddu and Baddu. Rababis used to perform kirtan regularly at Amritsar before the partition of India in 1947, after which many of the rababis migrated to Pakistan. The Sikh rabab was traditionally a local Punjabi variant known as the 'Firandia' rabab (Punjabi: ਫਿਰੰਦੀਆ ਰਬਾਬ Phiradī'ā rabāba), however Baldeep Singh, an expert in the Sikh musical tradition, challenges this narrative.

The last of the line of rababis was Bhai Chand. During the 20th century CE the instrument's use in Sikh kirtan was eclipsed by the harmonium but it has been revived.

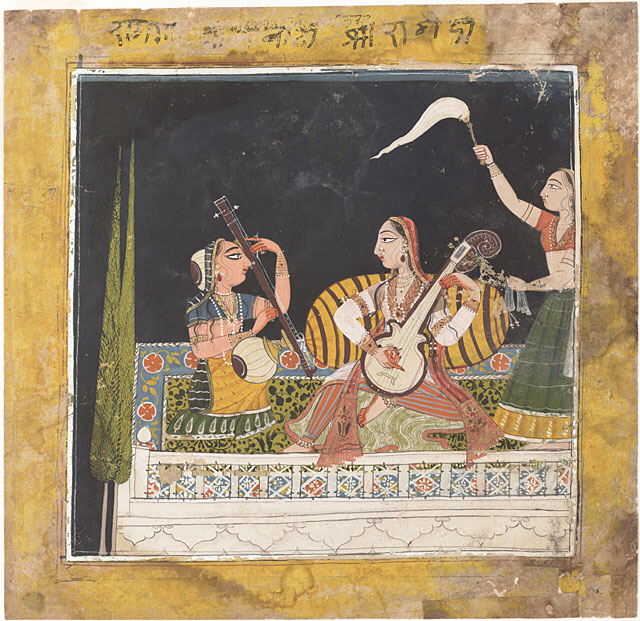
Women playing veena and seni rabab,1680-1700.

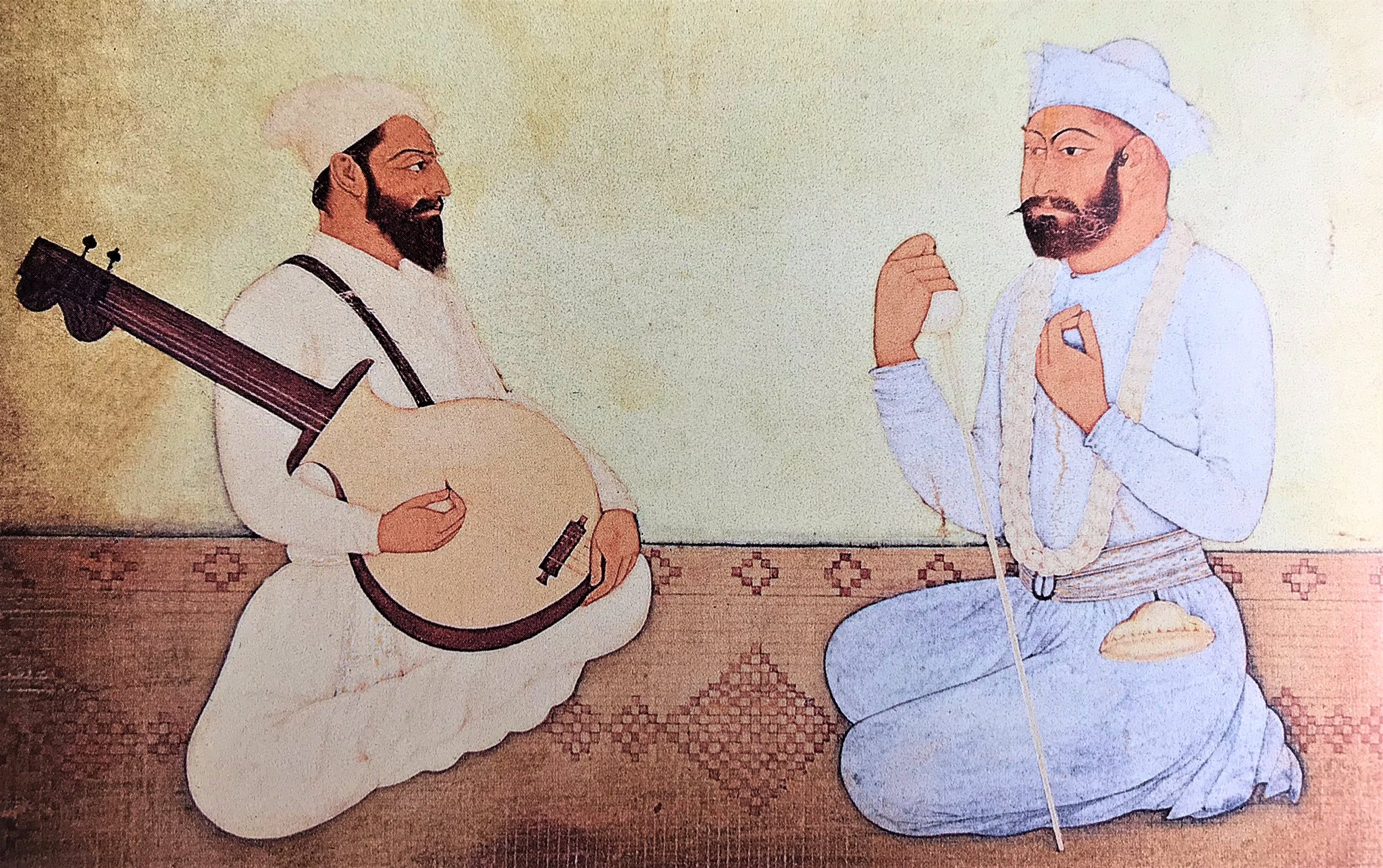
Guru Nanak and Bhai Mardana with rabab. circa 1740 (Bhai Suchet Singh Collection. Bhai Rupa)

== Prominent Performers of Seni Rabab ==
Ustad Baba Alauddin Khan, Pandit Radhika Mohan Maitra were the prominent players of the Seni Rabab or the Tanseni Rabab. Pandit Joydeep Mukherjee (musician), a grand disciple of Pandit Radhika Mohan Maitra, and a disciple of Late Guru Pranab Naha of Kolkata, has revived the Tanseni Rabab in the year 2024.
