= Rubab (instrument) =

Central Asian musical instrument

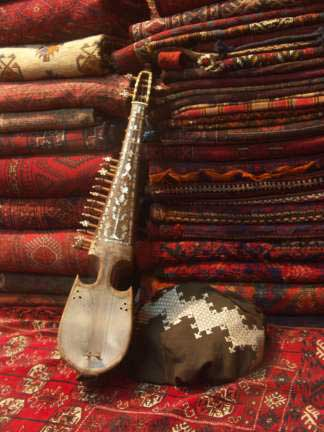
- Other names: Rabab
- Classification: Stringed instruments
- Hornbostel–Sachs classification: 321.321-6 (Necked bowl lutes)

Related instruments
- Arbajo, dotara, dranyen, Pamiri rubab, seni rebab, sarod, tungna, dutar, tanbur

Art of crafting and playing rubab/rabab
- UNESCO Intangible Cultural Heritage
- Country: Afghanistan, India, Iran, Pakistan, Tajikistan, and Uzbekistan
- Reference: 02143
- Region: Asia and the Pacific

Inscription history
- Inscription: 2024 (19th session)
- List: Representative

The rubab (UK: /rʊˈbæb/, US: /rʊˈbɑːb/) or robab (Note: Pashto and Persian: رباب; Punjabi: ਰਬਾਬ/رباب rabāb; Kashmiri: رَبابہٕ; Sindhi: رَبابُ/रबाबु; Azerbaijani and Turkish: rübab; Tajik and Uzbek: рубоб/rubob; Uyghur: راۋاب/rawap) is a lute-like musical instrument of Central Asian origin. It is the national musical instrument of Afghanistan and is also commonly played in India and Pakistan, mostly by Balochis and Kashmiris, and Punjabis.

Variants of the rubab include the Kabuli rebab of Afghanistan, the Uyghur rawap of Xinjiang, the Pamiri rubab of Tajikistan, and the North Indian seni rebab. The instrument and its variants spread throughout West, Central, South and Southeast Asia.

The Kabuli rebab from Afghanistan derives its name from the Arabic rebab and is played with a bow while in Central Asia and the Indian subcontinent, the instrument is plucked and is distinctly different in construction.

== Size variants ==
English	Strings	Pashto	Persian	In inches
Small	5 sympathetic strings	وړوکی رباب Warukay rabab	زيلچه Zaliche	27
Medium	19 strings, 13 sympathetic strings	منځنۍ) رباب) (Mianzanai) rabab	رباب Rubab	28
Large	21 strings, 15 sympathetic strings	لوی رباب Loy rabab	شاه‌رباب (king size) Shah rabab	30

== Components ==
Historical instruments

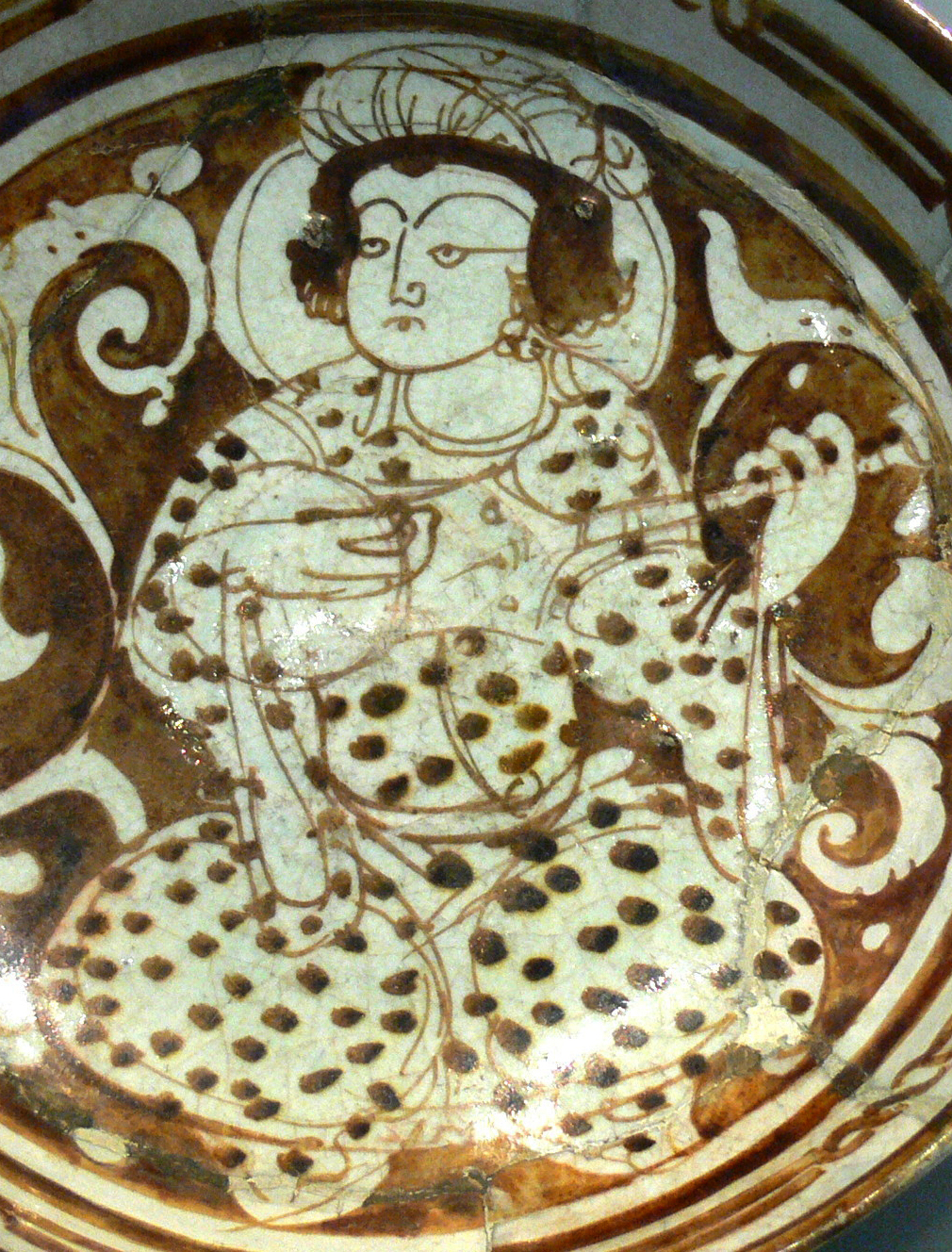
Iranian style rubab from the 13th century C.E., found in Rayy (near Tehran, Iran)

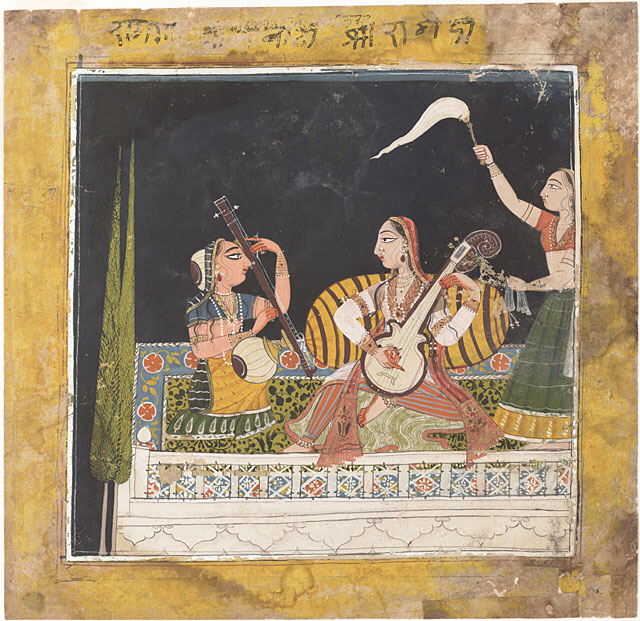
Woman playing the seni rebab in Medieval India, 1680–1700

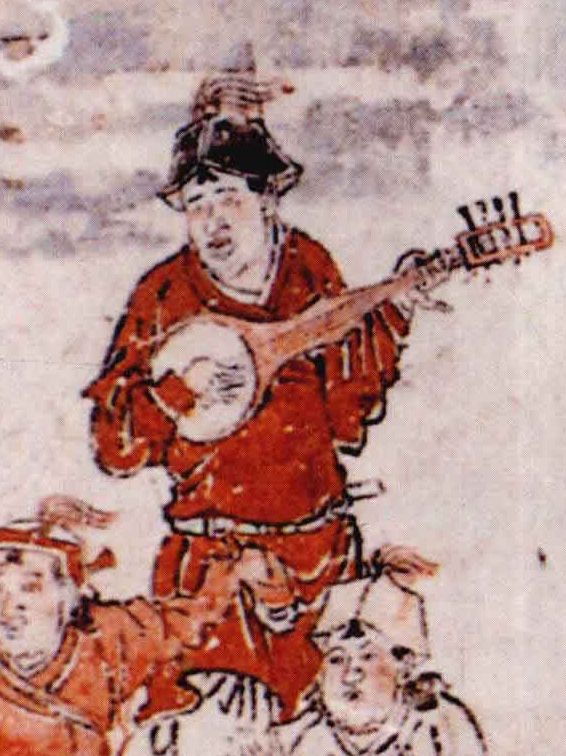
Mongolian lute, circa 1297, tomb of Wang Qing, China

English	Pashto	Persian
Headstock	تاج Tāj	سرپنجه or تاج "Tāj" or "Sar Penjah"
Tuning peg	غوږي Ghwagi/Ghwazhi	گوشی‌ Goshi/Gushi
Nut	?	شیطانک Sheitanak
Neck	غړۍ Gharai	دسته Dastah
Strings	تارونه Tāruna	تار Tār
Long/Low drones	شاتار Shātār	شاهتار Shahtar
Short/High drones	?	?
Sympathetic strings	بچي Bachi	?
Frets	پرده Pardah	پرده Pardah
Chest	سينه Sinah	سینه Sinah
Side	?	صفحه Safhah
Skin belly	ګوډی or څرمن "Tsarman" or "Goday"	پوست Pust
Head or Chamber	ډول Dol	کاسه Kasah
Bridge	ټټو Tatu	خرک Kharak
tailpiece	?	سیم‌گیر Seemgeer
Plectrum	شاباز Shabaz	مضراب Mezrab

In detail about the strings:

English	Explanation	Pashto	Persian
Strings	Main strings: 3 and made out of nylon Long Drone: 2-3 and made out of steel Short Drone: 2 and made out of steel	تارونه Tāruna	تار Tār
First/Low/Bass String	Low/Bass String is the thickest string	کټی Katay	?
Second String	Thinner than bass string and thicker than high string	بم Bam	بم Bam
Third/High String	The thinnest string out of all the three main strings	زېر Zer	زیر Zir

== Construction ==
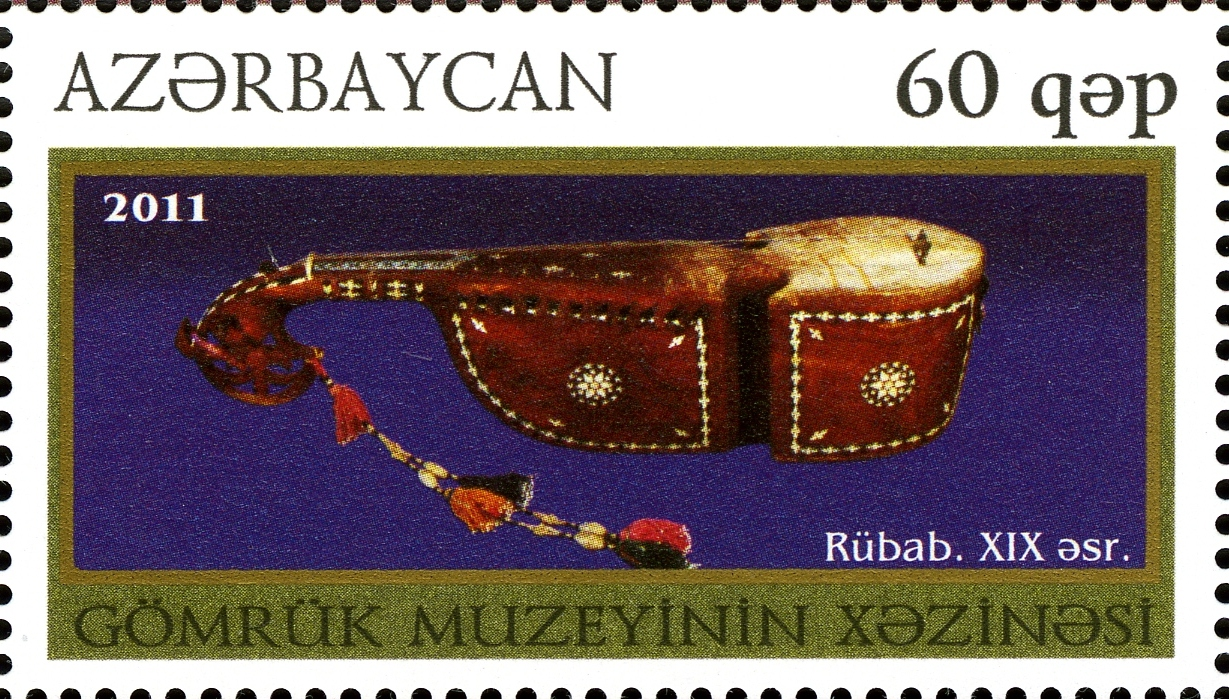
2011 postal stamp of Azerbaijan depicting a 19th-century rubab

The body is carved out of a single piece of wood, with a head covering a hollow bowl which provides the sound-chamber. The bridge sits on the skin and is held in position by the tension of the strings. It has three melody strings tuned in fourths, two or three drone strings and up to 15 sympathetic strings. The instrument is made from the trunk of a mulberry tree, the head from an animal skin such as goat, and the strings from the intestines of young goats (gut) or nylon.

== History ==
The earliest historical record of an instrument named rabab dates back to 10th-century Arabic texts, as identified by Henry George Farmer. This instrument, along with its variations like rubab, rebab, and rabob, subsequently gained popularity in various regions of West, Central, South, and Southeast Asia. It is mentioned in old Persian books, and many Sufi poets mention it in their poems. It is the traditional instrument of Khorasan present Afghanistan and is widely used in countries such as Pakistan, Azerbaijan, Iran, Turkey, Iraq, Tajikistan, and Uzbekistan, as well as in the Xinjiang province of northwest China and the Jammu and Kashmir and Punjab regions of northwest India.

The rubab is known as "the lion of instruments" and is one of the two national instruments of Afghanistan (with the zerbaghali). Classical Afghan music often features this instrument as a key component. Elsewhere it is known as the Kabuli rebab in contrast to the Seni rebab of India. In appearance, the Kabuli rubab looks slightly different from the Indian rubab. It is the ancestor of the north Indian sarod, although unlike the sarod, it is fretted.

The rubab was the first instrument used in Sikhism; it was used by Bhai Mardana, companion of the first guru, Guru Nanak. Whenever a shabad was revealed to Guru Nanak he would sing and Bhai Mardana would play on his rubab; he was known as a rababi. The rubab playing tradition is carried on by Sikhs such as Namdharis.

In 2024, UNESCO recognised the art of creating the rubab as an Intangible cultural heritage in Afghanistan, Iran, Tajikistan and Uzbekistan.

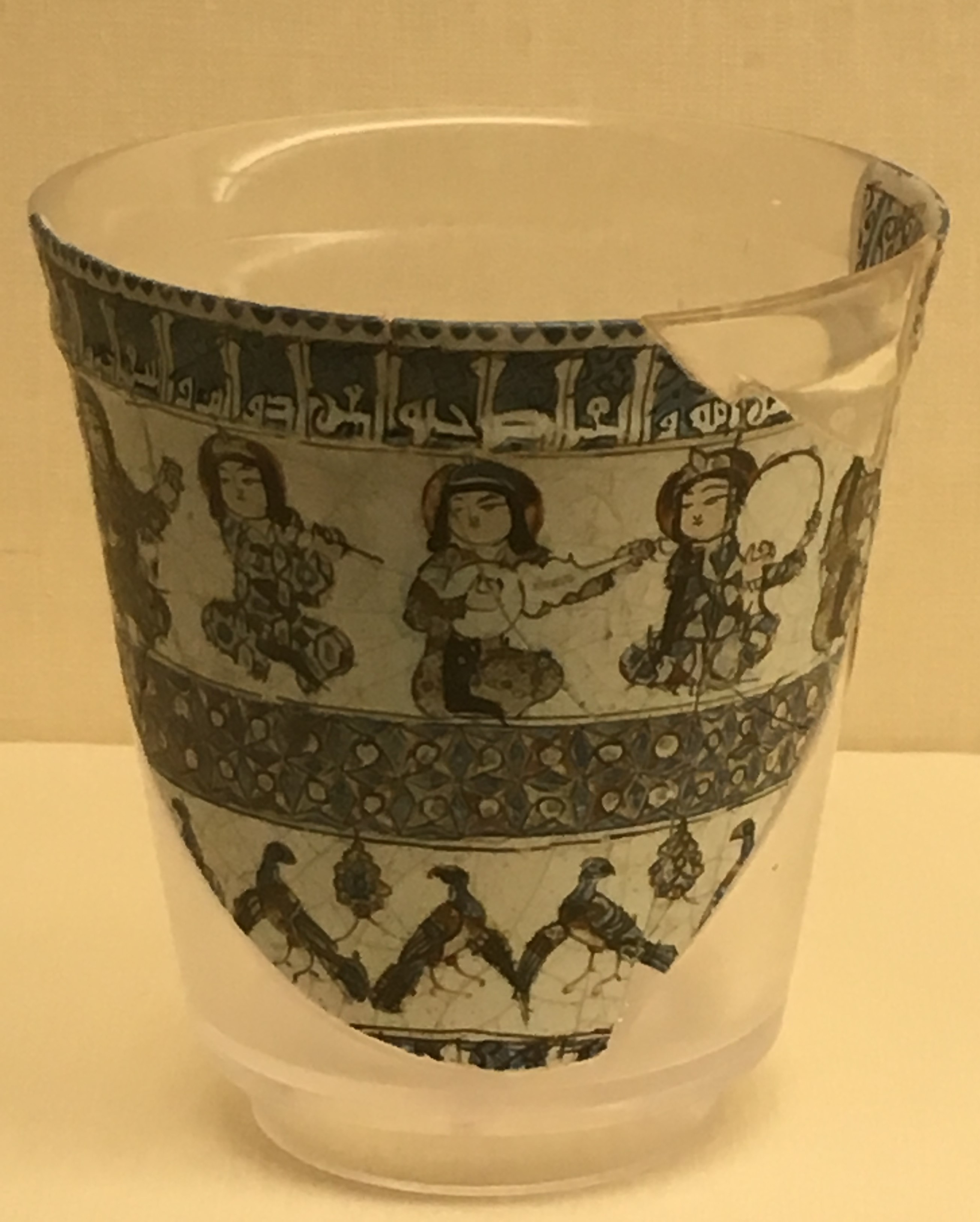
Late 12th-early 13th century, Iran. Musicians with ney, rubab and daf.

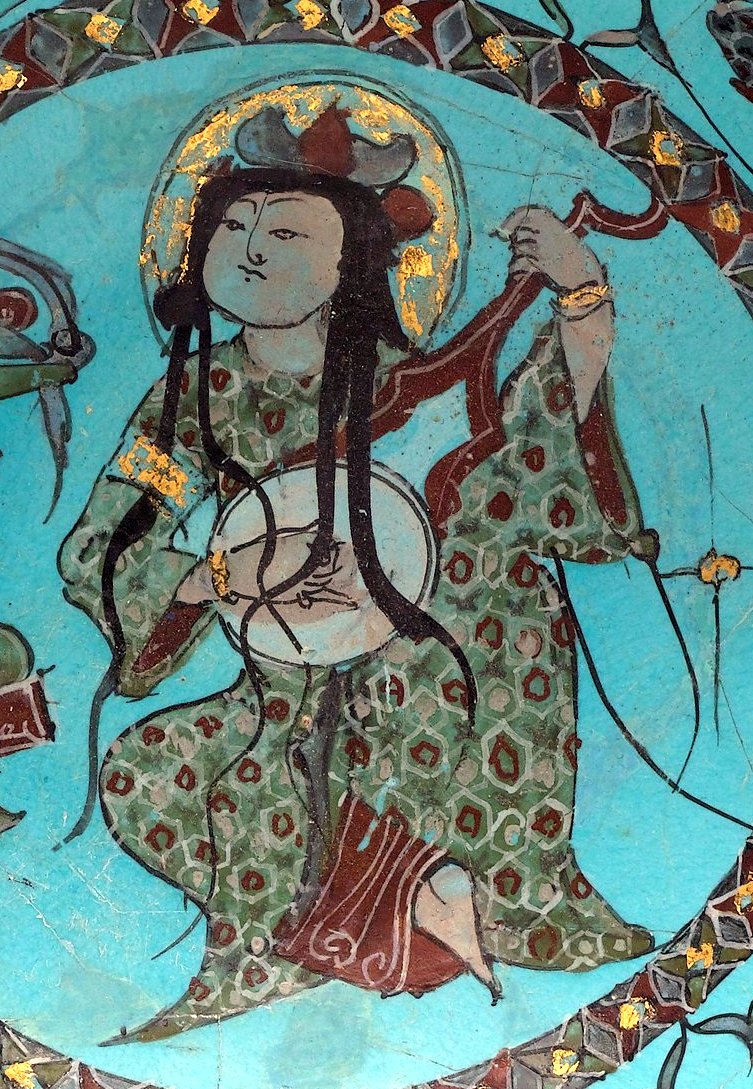
Late 12th-early 13th century A.D., Iran. Musician playing rubab.

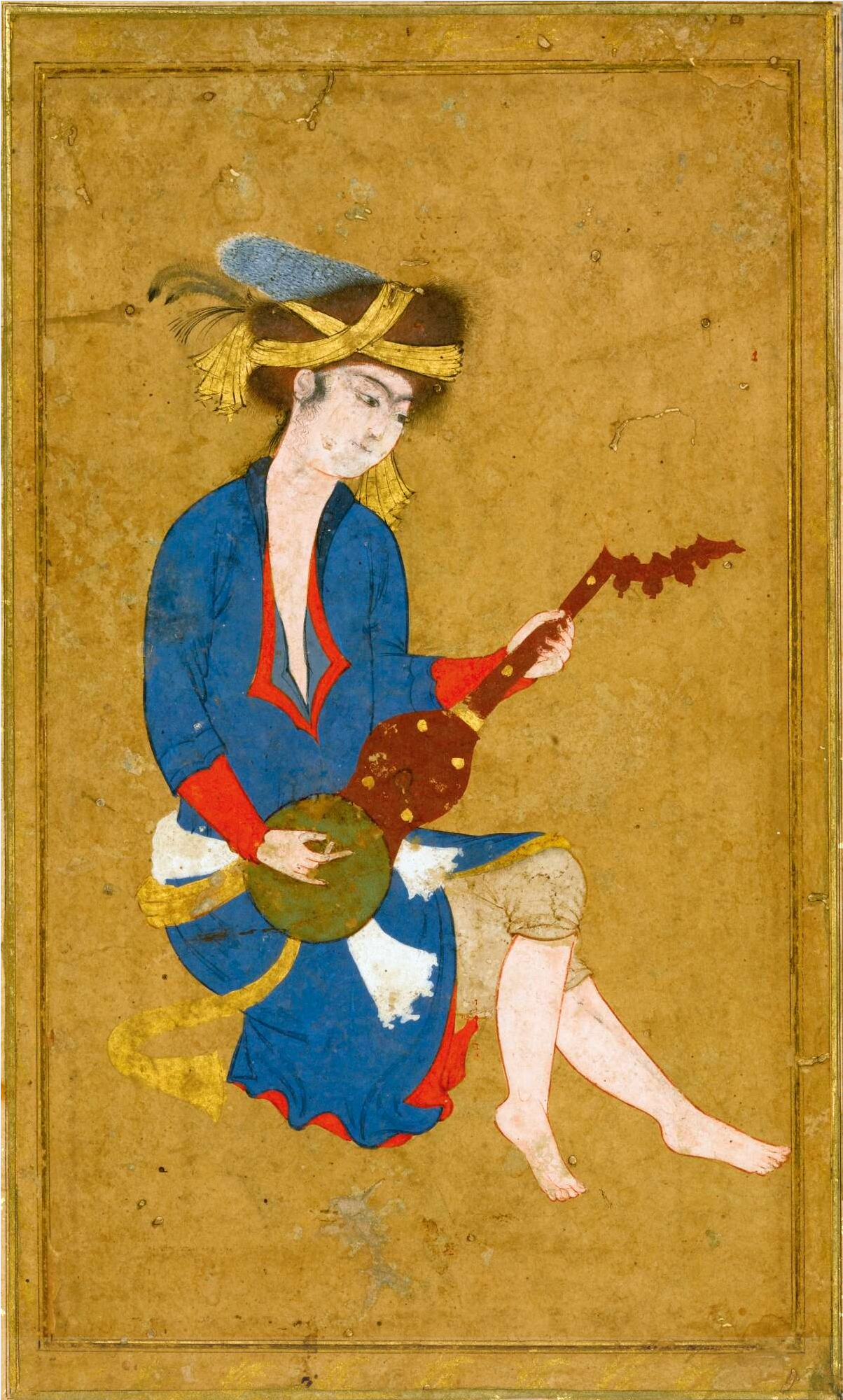
Young man with Iranian rubab, 16th century, Safavid Empire. 8-shaped body resembles a tar, but tars have both sides of the 8 covered with hide. Rubabs had a lower section covered with hide, and an upper hollow section covered with wood.

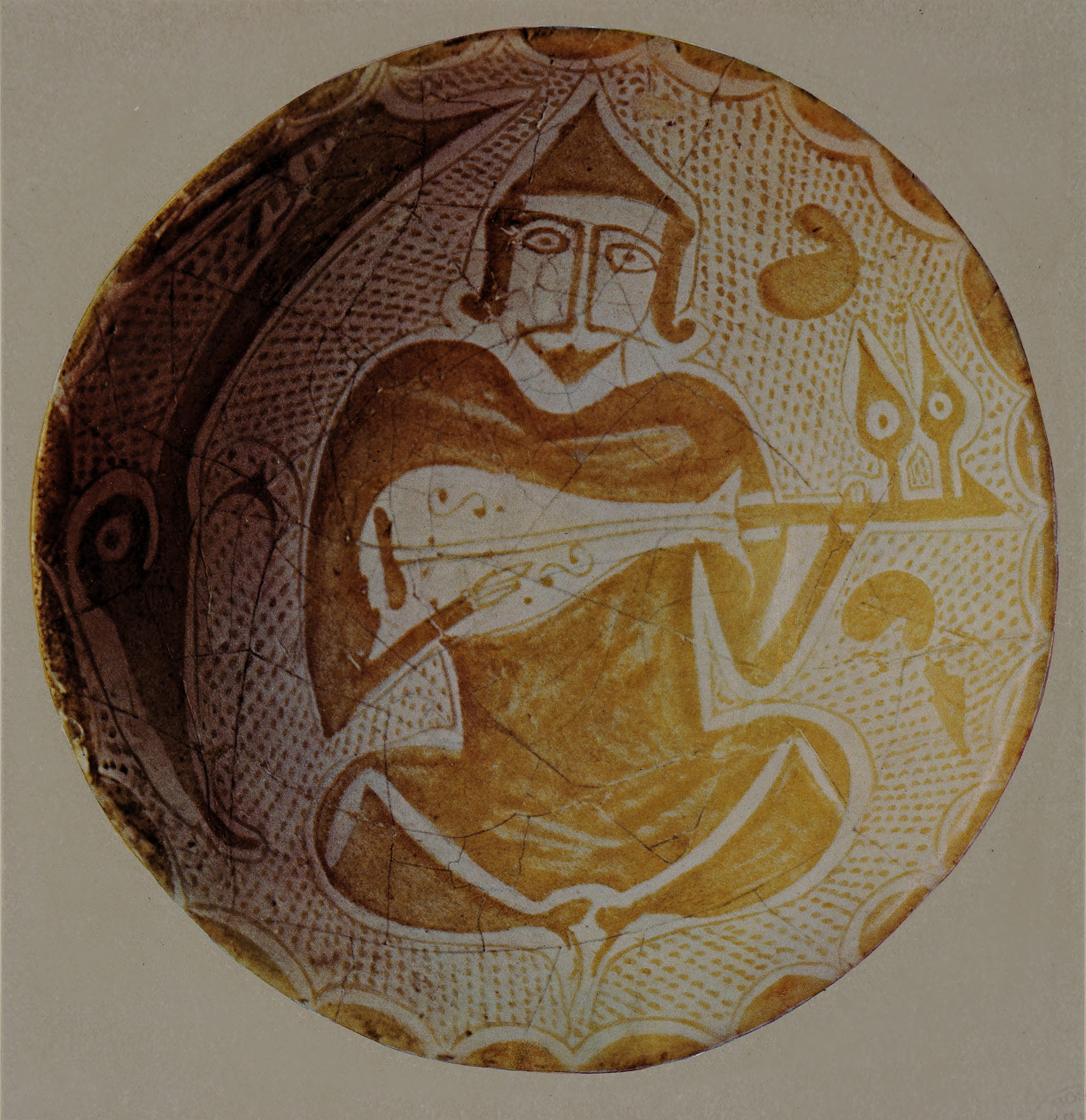
Iraq or Egypt. Abbasid era rubab, painted on the inside of a bowl, 10th century CE. Appears to be spike lute (the neck inserted into the body, beneath the soundboard. The instrument has two strings.

== Variants ==
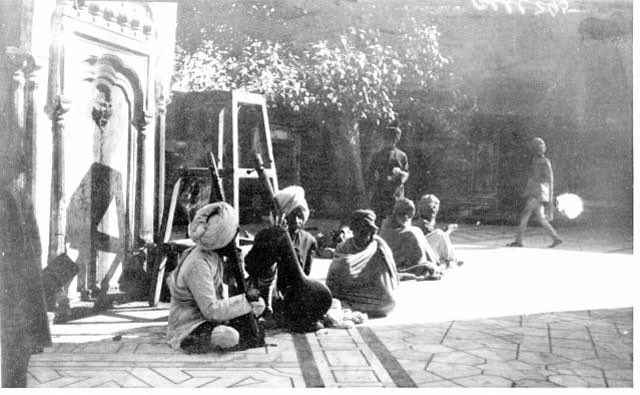
Photograph of rabab players (rababis) titled 'Lute Players Near the Golden Temple', taken on 28 January 1903

In northern India, the seni rebab, which emerged during the Mughal Empire, has "a large hook at the back of its head, making it easier for a musician to sling it over the shoulder and play it even while walking."

The Sikh rabab was traditionally a local Punjabi variant known as the 'Firandia' rabab (Punjabi: ਫਿਰੰਦੀਆ ਰਬਾਬ Phiradī'ā rabāba), however Baldeep Singh, an expert in the Sikh musical tradition, challenges this narrative.

In Tajikistan a similar but somewhat distinct rubab-i-pamir (Pamiri rubab) is played, employing a shallower body and neck. The rubab of the Pamir area has six gut strings, one of which, rather than running from the head to the bridge, is attached partway down the neck, similar to the fifth string of the American banjo.

== Notable players ==
- Bhai Mardana, companion of Guru Nanak and one of the first Sikhs (1459 - 1534)
- Ustad Mohammed Omar (1905–1980), Rabab player From Kabul, Afghanistan
- Ustad Rahim Khushnawaz (1943–2011), Rabab Player From Herat, Afghanistan
- Ustad Homayun Sakhi, Rabab Player From Kabul, Afghanistan
- Ustad Ramin Saqizada, Rabab Player From Afghanistan
- Ustad Sadiq Sameer, Rabab Player, From Afghanistan
- Ustad Shahzaib Khan, Rabab Player From Nowshera/Nokhar, Pakistan
- Ustad Waqar Atal, Rabab Player, From Peshawer, Pakistan
- Ustad Hamyuo sakhi, Rabab player, From Afghanistan
- John S. Baily, emeritus Professor of Ethnomusicology at Goldsmiths, University of London
- Khaled Arman (b. 1965), Rabab Player and Guitarist From Kabul, Afghanistan
- Daud Khan Sadozai, Afghan Rubab and Sarod Player from Kabul Afghanistan

== See also ==
- Rababi
- Rebab
- Rebec
- Sarod
