= Pamiri rubab =

Instrument

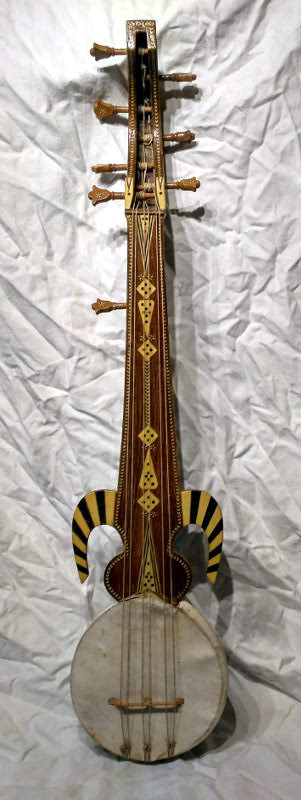
- Pamir rubab, front view
- Classification: Necked bowl lutes; String instruments

Related instruments
- Arbajo, Dotara, Dranyen, Kabuli rebab, Seni rebab, Sarod, Tungana, Dutar, Tanbur

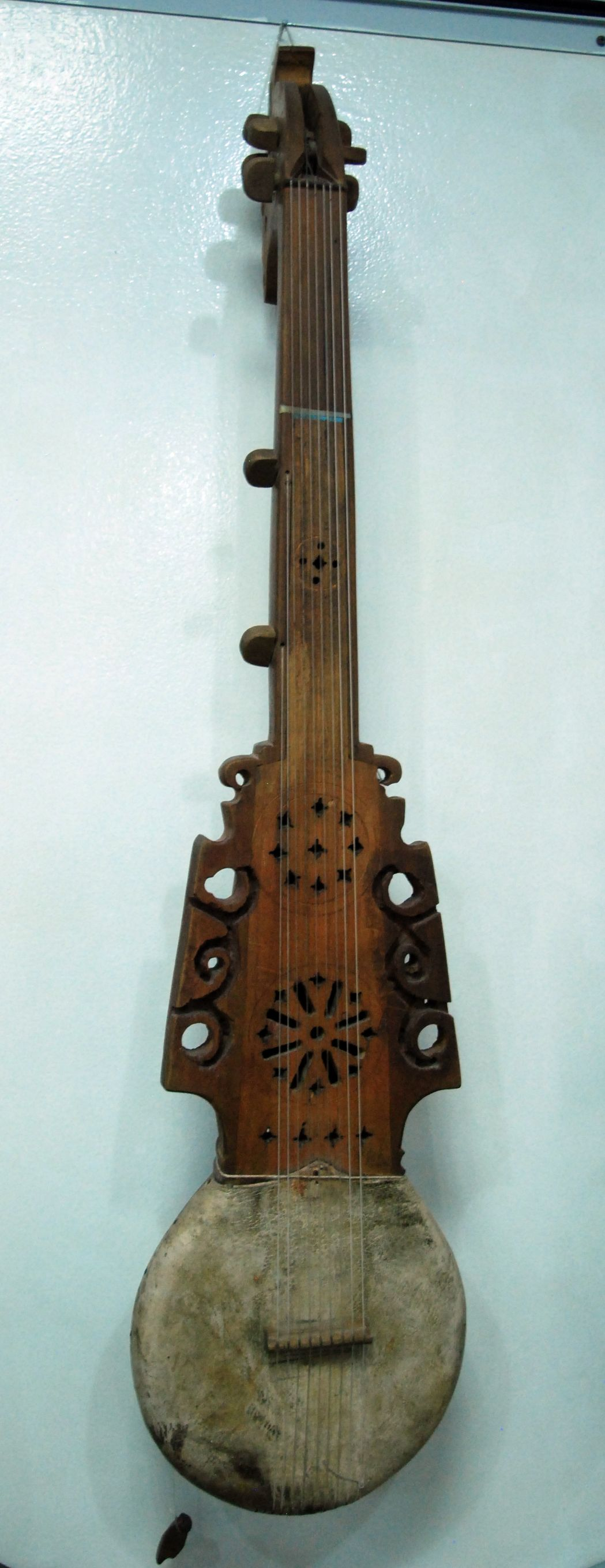
Nine-stringed Pamiri rubab, from Khorugh, Badakhshan, Tajikistan with different neck decorations

The Pamiri rubab (Russian and Tajiki: рубоб) is a fretless six-strung lute, carved from a single piece of wood with a skin head. It is played in the Badakhshan region of Tajikistan, as part of the Pamiri musical tradition.

The Pamiri rubab has six gut strings or nylon strings, one of which, rather than running from the head to the bridge, is attached partway down the neck, similar to the fifth string of the American banjo. The instrument is primarily used for drone and rhythm accompaniment, for instance accompanying spoken or sung poetry. The rubab is played for the way it sounds, the gut strings emitting a "less strident sound" than that produced by a metal strung instrument.
