= Kutumba (band) =

Nepalese folk band

Kutumba कुटुम्ब
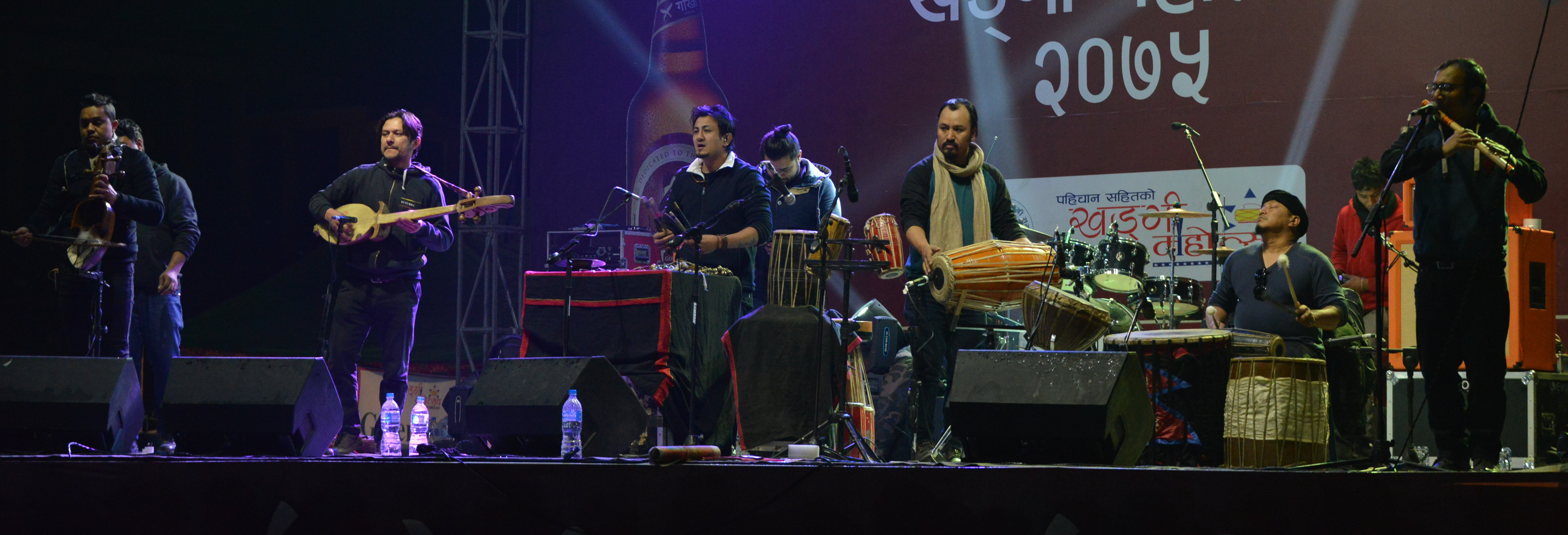
- Kutumba band at Khadgi Mahotsav 2075 (2019)

Background information
- Origin: Kathmandu, Nepal
- Genres: Nepali folk music
- Years active: 2004–present
- Labels: reehaz, EMW, SAC. Kutumba
- Members: Arun Manandhar; Kiran Nepali; Pavit Maharjan; Raju Maharjan; Rubin Kumar Shrestha; Siddhartha Maharjan; Arun Gurung (Manager); Niraj Maharjan (Stage Manager)
- Past members: Sarangi: Rashil Palanchoke; Flute: Binay Maharjan; Flute: Suresh Kaji Shrestha; Effects player: Sambhu Manandhar
- Website: www.kutumba.com.np

Kutumba is a Nepalese instrumental folk music band. It only uses Nepalese traditional musical instruments such as bamboo flutes, sarangi, madal, tungna, dhol, jhyamta, arbajoo, dhime, dhyangro, damphu, khin, and singing bowl. The band recorded a single for season 6 of Coke Studio Pakistan, which aired in late 2013. They have collaborated with other Nepali artists such as Navneet Aditya Waiba, Satya Aditya Waiba, Albatross, Hari Maharjan, 1974 AD and Astha Tamang Maskey. They competed in the AI Song Contest 2021 alongside Diwas, Chepang, and Hari Maharjan with the song "Dreaming of Nepal", placing 17th with 15 points.

Band logo

== Discography ==
- Forever Nepali Folk Instrumental (2004)
- Folk Roots (2005)
- Naulo Bihani (2006)
- Mithila (2009)
- Utsarga (2010)
- Karmath (2013)
- Himalayan Highlands (2017)

== Personnel ==
- Tungna and Arbajo: Arun Manandhar
- Sarangi: Kiran Nepali
- Percussion: Pavit Maharjan
- Percussion: Raju Maharjan
- Flute: Rubin Kumar Shrestha
- Effects: Siddhartha Maharjan
- Manager/ Technical Coordinator: Arun Gurung
- Stage/ Line Manager: Niraj Maharjan

== See also ==
- Navneet Aditya Waiba
- Nepathya
- 1974 AD
