= Sarangi (Nepali) =

Musical instrument

Nepali Sarangi
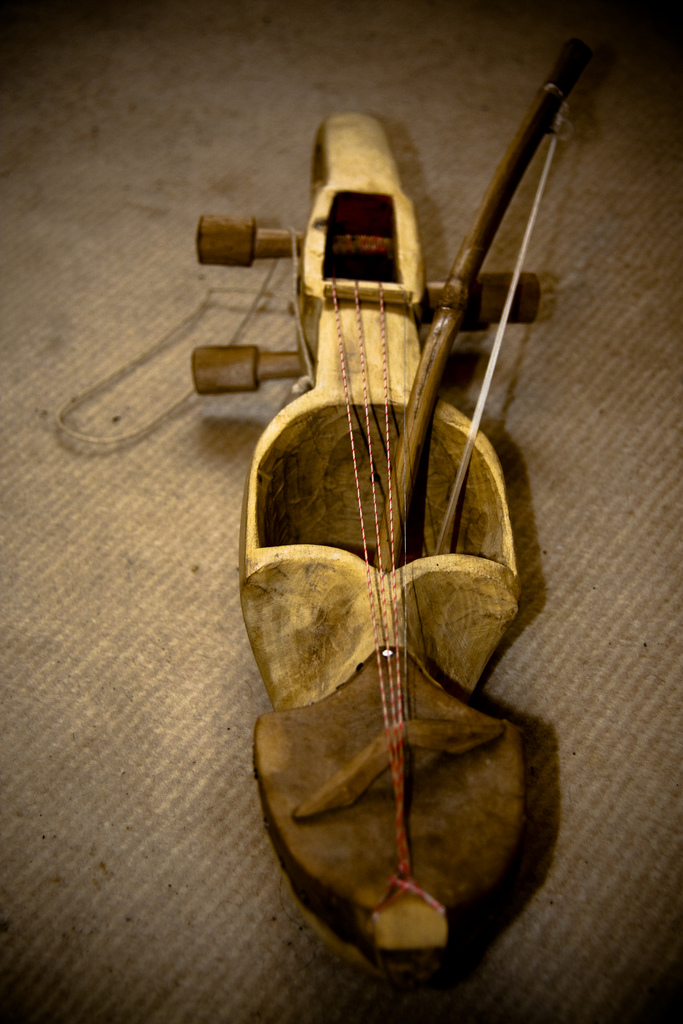
- Sarangi is a 4-string bowed lute

String instrument
- Other names: Sarangi
- Classification: Chordophone
- Hornbostel–Sachs classification: 321.321 (chordophone--necked bowl lute: the handle is attached to or carved from the resonator, like a neck)
- Inventor: Gandarbha people

Related instruments
- Sarangi

Musicians
- Jhalak Man Gandarbha

Sound sample
- Sarangi performed by Balaram Gandharba in Kathmandu.

The Nepali Sarangi (Nepali: नेपाली सारङ्गी) is a Nepali folk instrument. It is a chordophone played by bowing. Traditionally in Nepal, the Sarangi was only played by people of Gandarbha or Gaine caste (both contested and interchangeable terms), who sing narrative tales and folk song, however, in present days, its popularity extends beyond the Gandharba community and is widely used and played by other caste members as well. It has also garnered much interest in music genres such as Nepali rock and film music. While the Sarangi has long been a quintessential Gandharba instrument, its counterpart, the arbajo, which is a plucked lute that's rarely played except for a few bands like Kutumba.

== Construction ==
Traditional Nepali Sarangi is not standardized with regards to shape, construction materials, or scale or key. It is made up of a single piece of wood. Having a neck and hollowed-out double-chambered body, they are often made from woods of trees that are easily available, most often that of saaj (साज, Terminalia elliptica), sisau (सिसौ, Dalbergia sissoo), khirro (खिर्रो, Falconeria), bakaino (बकाइनो, Melia azedarach), salla (सल्ला, Pinus), saur (सौर, Betula alnoides), lankuri (लाँकुरी, Fraxinus floribunda), chilaune (चिलाउने, Schima wallichii) or aanp (आँप, Mangifera indica). While the upper chamber is left open, the lower opening, upon which the bridge rests, is generally covered up with dried skin of sheep or goat. The neck is fretless, and the strings are tied upon and tuned with the tuning pegs. The size of Sarangi differs according to the players' preference.

The Nepali Sarangi consists of four strings. The original strings were made up of sheep intestine, similar to the use of catgut (made from the intestines of cattle) in many musical traditions around the world. The Gandharba received intestines of sheep sacrificed during major festivals like Dashain, which they left in a pot for some days. Once the entrails was fully rotten, it was pulled out, leaving behind the fine nerves of the intestine in the pot. These were then woven to make strings. However these days, badminton strings, nylon and steel strings have generally replaced gut strings. The bow was traditionally strung with horse tail-hair, but, in the modern days, nylon bowstrings are common.

== Tuning of the instrument ==
The range of the sarangi covers almost two octaves, and it is tuned low Sa Pa Pa high Sa. From right to left, the four strings of the sarangi are tuned to the lower fifth, root, root, and octave notes of a particular key. For example, if the middle two strings were tuned to G, the first and fourth strings would be tuned to the C notes below and above the G respectively. The middle two strings are used as drone. Alternatively the string can be tuned low Pa Sa Sa high Pa; if the middle strings were tuned to G, the low string would be a D below the middle string and the high string the D above.

At the performer’s discretion, the instrument is tuned either by ear to an arbitrary key, or when performing in a recording studio or with musical instruments of other cultures, tuned to a specific Western key.String order (thick → thin / left → right) 1. 1st string (thickest) → Sa (Tonic) 2. 2nd string → Pa (Perfect Fifth) 3. 3rd string → Sa (Upper Octave) 4. 4th string (thinnest) → Pa (Upper Octave) Example Notes If Sa = C: • 1st string → C • 2nd string → G • 3rd string → C (higher octave) • 4th string → G (higher octave)

== Performance techniques ==
There are different methods of producing notes on the Sarangi. Most players play the Sarangi by pressing the strings slightly with their fingers of the left hand and bowing the strings with right hand. However, Bharat Nepali and his students rub their left hand fingernails to rub against the strings to create sound.

Also, traditionally, the Gandarvas used to bow the root note continuously along with the notes of the song. As Sarangi is usually the only instrument used in their songs, except some Nepali percussion like Madal, the continuous sound of the root note (or drone from the 2 middle strings) provides the ambiance. Nowadays the Sarangi is also played along with other instruments, performers do not bow the drone string continuously.

Unlike the traditional way of playing the Sarangi in a single key, modern players have started to use modal techniques to play the Sarangi in different keys. Along with the folk tunes, the Sarangi players also experimenting the use of this instrument in modern and western genres these days.

== The Sarangi Players: Gandharba ==
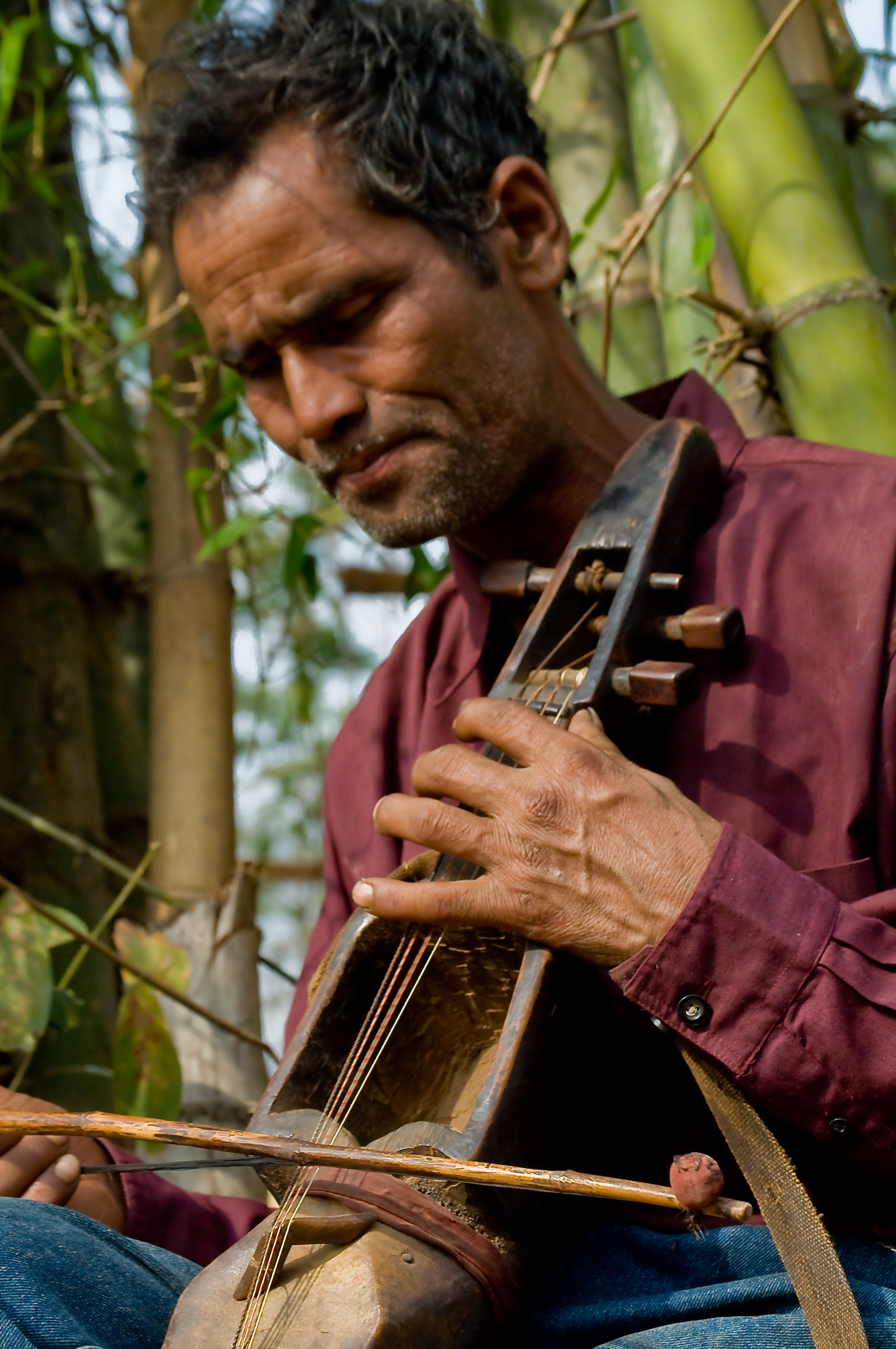
A bamboo sarangi from Nepal

The Nepali word Gandharva is derived from Sanskrit language. According to Brihad Nepali Shabdakosh (Extensive Nepali Dictionary), Gandharba is a caste whose members are famous for singing the songs of historical, social, political and cultural legacy such as gatha sabai, gatha, karkha. These were songs mostly written in the praise of the then kings, prime ministers, national heroes and nation as well.

A song performed by Balaram Gandarbha in Kathmandu.

As in the past, the Gandharba still travel from one place to another singing about legendary heroes, national history, their lived experiences and the lives of the people they encountered on their way. That tradition is still seen across Nepal where Gandharba travel to other villages and sing songs to earn their living. Gandharba also make instruments or work as session musicians these days.

== Contemporary use of Sarangi ==
Jhalak Man Gandarbha was a renowned player who has composed many popular songs like "Aamaale Sodhlin" on Sarangi.

With the rise of Nepali folk bands like Kutumba (band), many Nepali musicians have been inspired to learn this traditional instrument. A third-generation sarangi player in his family, Kiran Nepali runs a sarangi centre in Kathmandu called Project Sarangi where sarangi lessons are given to aspiring musicians.

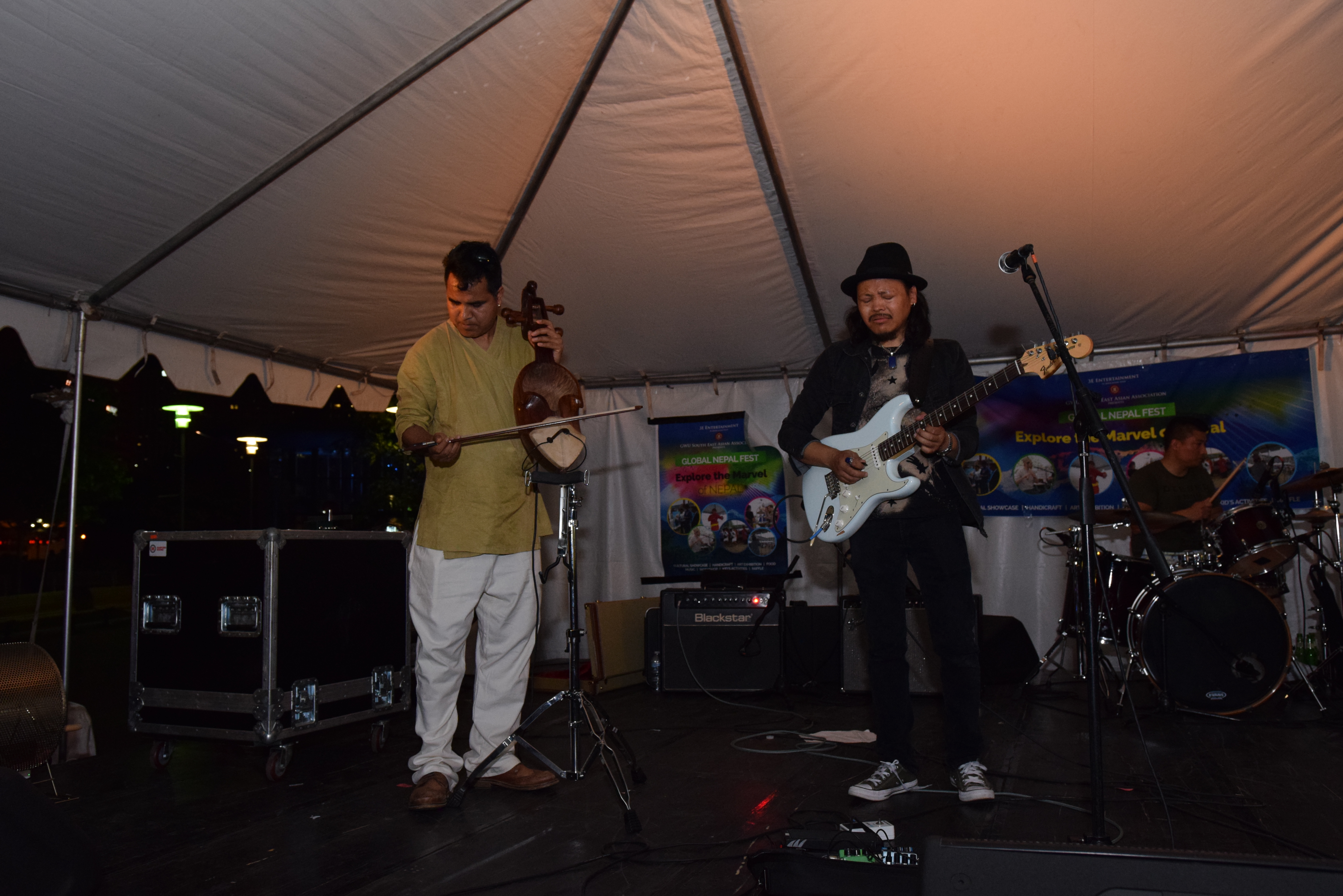
In recent times, the use of Sarangi in Nepalese folk rock and pop songs has increased

Because of its popularity, historical importance, and socio-cultural value, the sarangi has been featured by a number of television and radio programmes in Nepal. The reality radio drama Katha Mitho Sarangiko and radio magazine Sarangiko Bhalakusari (both produced by BBC Media Action Nepal) have used the term sarangi in their names as a tribute to this outstanding instrument.

Barta Gandharba is a female sarangi player who is known for her appearance in the Voice of Nepal music competition in 2019.

== Nepali family of sarangi players ==
The Nepali family is one of the most well known and influential Gandharva families in Nepali music.

Ram Sharan Nepali was one of the first Gandharvas to travel and perform outside of Nepal. He is known for his virtuosic, expressive playing, and modernizing the Sarangi. His innovations to the instrument include stringing the sarangi with metal strings, and playing with a violin bow instead of a traditional Sarangi bamboo bow.

Magar Gaine Nepali, father of Ram Sharan Nepali, wrote many songs that are loved in Nepal including Kanchi Matyang Tyang, and Sani Sani. He taught the art, craft, and philosophy of The Gandharvas and Sarangi playing to his son and grandsons.

Shyam Nepali, son of Ram Sharan Nepali and grandson of Magar Gaine, is currently living in the USA and has had a long career of traveling the world as a cultural ambassador, performing, teaching, and recording. Shyam founded the Himalayan Heritage Cultural Academy in Boston, USA to teach the art of Sarangi and Nepali music and dance to the ever growing Nepali diaspora. Shyam is an active touring musician and teacher collaborating with musicians all over the world in many different genres and has appeared on over 50 recordings.

Shyam Nepali taught and inspired many of the next generation of Sarangi players including Barta Gandharva, and his son Prince Nepali.

Purna Nepali, son of Ram Sharan Nepali, makes handmade, professional quality Sarangis at his workshop in Kathmandu, Nepal.

== See also ==
- Navneet Aditya Waiba
- Sarangi
- Sarinda
