= Zerbaghali =

The zerbaghali is a goblet-shaped hand drum that is played in the folk music of Afghanistan.

== Origin ==
The shape of the zerbghali is derived from Persian forms. In contrast with the Persian tumbak, which has a wooden body, the zerbghali is made of clay throughout Afghanistan. The zerbghali and the tumbak fall into the same family of Oriental goblet drums as the Moroccan darbuka and the doumbek of Azerbaijan. Several drums are common in Afghanistan, including a skin-covered open-ended drum from India, a drum similar to the Indian tabla, and a Pashtun double drum known as the dholak which is played by hand in a sitting position, similar to the dohol, which is hung around the neck with a ribbon and played with sticks.

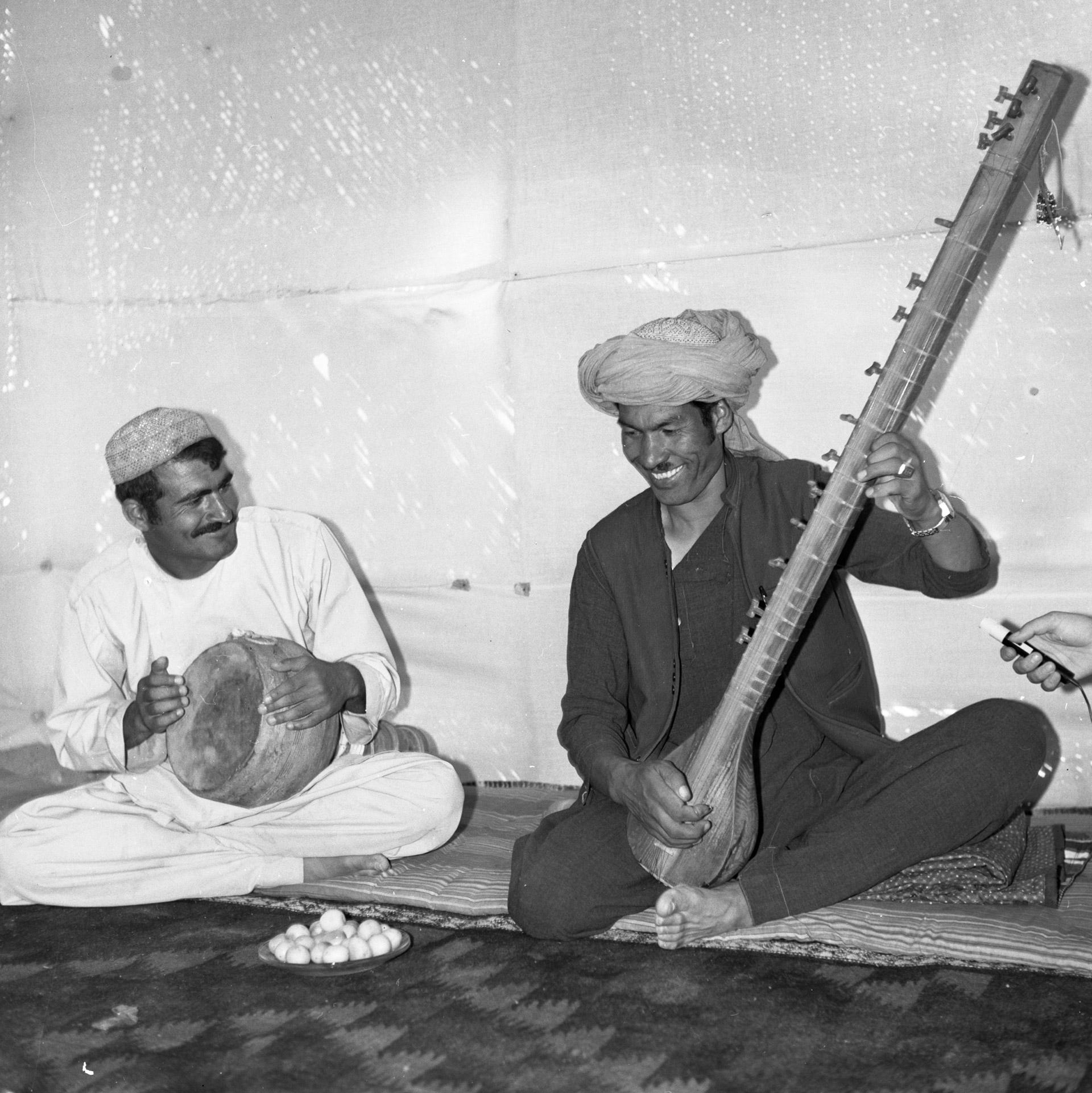
A zerbaghali drum (left) being played with a tanbur (right).

== Form and technique ==
Drums may be glazed or unglazed. Zerbghalis are more durable than clay, but more expensive, with some being made out of wood. The skin is glued and clamped to the edge with a strip of red goatskin. If needed, the skin can be held near a fire to tighten it. More recently, musicians have employed dabs of black paste, known as Syahi, to change the tone of the drum, following the Indian tradition. The size can vary greatly, from 30 inches in diameter and a length of 45 cm.

The player sits cross-legged on the floor, with the drum under his left armpit. Or he may lay it horizontally over his legs. The beat is mainly kept with the right hand. The playing technique is based on the Persian tombak or the Indian tabla. The fingers of the right hand beat the low notes, and the fingers of the left hand produce the high notes, pressing the skin to change the sound. Various versions of hand-motion are used to modify the sound.

In rural areas of Afghanistan, zerbghali playing is primitive, with no special techniques employed. It is played throughout the country, except in the far north. Even in cities, the zerbghali is common in traditional musical ensembles, along with the rubab and dholak or tabla. In the rural areas, these may be replaced by the tanbur or various flutes.

In the early 20th century the zerbghali was not common in Herat, with the dohol being more important. From the 1950s on, the zerbghali was introduced in Herati teahousese as an accompaniment to the Persian dutar. In the 1970s, bands were using a 14-string dutar, an Indian harmonium or rubab, and zerbghali. In 1978 or 1979, Germans recorded a group of musicians playing Negrabi Malang Zerbaghali.

Women generally prefer to play the dairah for amateur music at weddings, or for vocal accompaniment along with the harmonium. In the 1970s, a few women played zerbghali. To accompany female wedding guests, musicians also played the bamboo flute and the tula.

== Discography ==
- Abdul Majid (Tanbur), Golam Nabi (Dilruba), Malang (Zerbaghali), Gholam Hassan (Sarinda) u.a.: Afghanistan – Music from Kabul. Aufgenommen 1973. Als CD bei Lyrichord Archive Series
- Bangicha (Zerbaghali) u.a.: Afghanistan. A Journey to an Unknown Musical World. Aufgenommen 1974 vom WDR. Als CD bei Network 1994. (4 tracks with zerbaghali)

== Literature ==
- John Baily: Music of Afghanistan: Professional Musicians in the City of Herat. Cambridge University Press, Cambridge 1988, S. 19f, 32, 36, 132, 167
- Hiromi Lorraine Sakata: Afghan musical instruments: drums. Afghanistan Journal, 7 (1), 1980, S. 30–32
- Mark Slobin: Music in the Culture of Northern Afghanistan. University of Arizona Press, Tucson 1976, S. 261–264
