= Folk Roots (album) =

Studio album by Kutumba
- Released: 2005
- Genre: Nepali Folk

Kutumba chronology
Forever Nepali Folk Instrumental (2004)	Folk Roots (2005)	Naulo Bihani (2006)

Folk Roots is the second studio album by Nepali folk band Kutumba. It is contains instrumentals of old Nepali songs and Nepali folk songs which are covered, remastered and improvised by the band. The album is produced and marketed by SAC Music International. It is one of Kutumba's most famous albums that introduces old songs to the new young generation. The band has improvised these old songs and produced it in better quality preserving these immortal Nepali songs for the new generation. The album features a 9:00 minutes long instrumental of "Asarai Mahinama" and instrumentals of other famous folk songs like "Sindhuli Gadi", "Ful Ko Thunga" and others. As their name, Kutumba is all about bringing together traditional folk tunes and instruments with new and improvised sounds and ideas.

== Personnel ==
- Drum [Madal] – Pavit Maharjan
- Drums [Skin Drums] – Raju Maharjan
- Effects – Shambhu Manandhar
- Flute [Bamboo Flute] – Rubin K. Shrestha
- Other [Tungna] – Arun Manandhar
- Sarangi – Rashil Palanchoke
- Recorded By, Mastered By – Krishna Shrestha, Sudeep Maharjan

== Track listing ==
Track No.	Title	Time
1	Saya Thari Baajaa	6:03
2	Asarai Mahina Ma	8:58
3	Maitighar	4:44
4	Sindhuli Gadi	5:25
5	Phool Ko Thunga	7:50
6	Ghar Timro	4:56
7	Rato Pachyauri	6:12
8	Jhamke Phuli	5:50
9	Tamang Selo	7:24
10	Hyangu Sinha	9:32
