= Gandarbha =

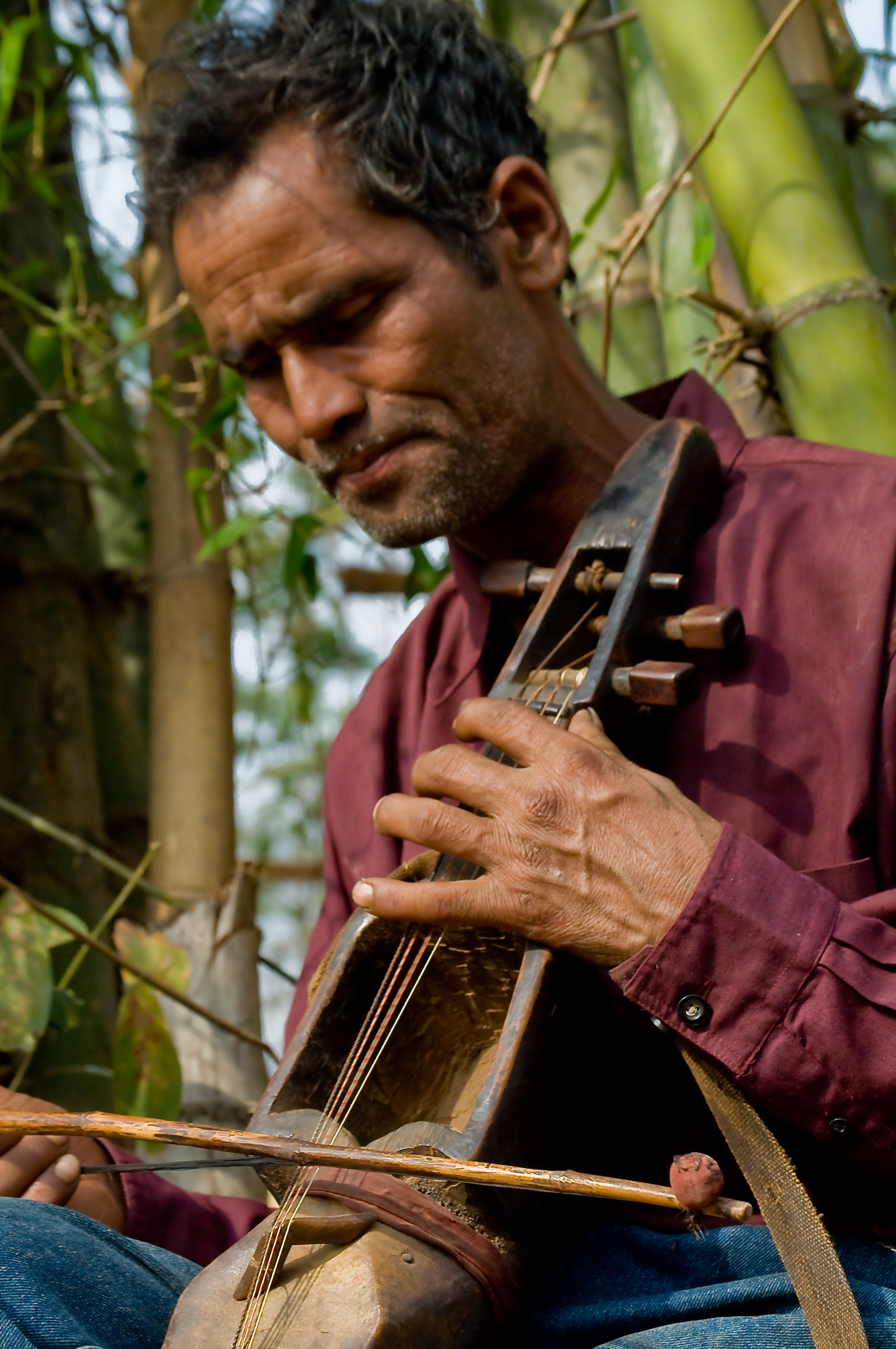
Gandarbha singing and playing the Nepali sarangi.

Sarangi Music by Balaram Gandarbha.ogg

A song performed by Balaram Gandarbha in Kathmandu

The Gandarbha caste (Nepali: गन्धर्व जाति) or Gaine (Nepali: गाईने) is a tribal community which belongs to the Indo-Aryan ethnic group from the central, hilly region of Nepal. They have also been called a "caste of professional musicians" and "itinerant bards." By tradition they make their living by singing Gandarbha Geet or Gaine Geet, a type of folk song. The Gandarbhas traditionally work as travelling musicians and play traditional folk and historical songs. They also improvise songs, incorporating news into them as a service, in return for which they receive donations of food or other things. They use the Nepali sarangi, a type of violin, as their main musical instrument. The sarangi has been an iconic musical instrument identified with the Gandarbha people. The instrument replaced another instrument they played, the aarbajo, which was larger and more cumbersome. They speak their own language which is called Parse kura.

Due to caste-based discrimination in Nepal, the government legally abolished the caste-system and criminalized any caste-based discrimination, including "untouchability" (the ostracism of a specific caste) - in 1963.

== Geographic distribution ==
Recently Central Bureau of Statistics of Nepal classifies the Gaine/Gandarbha within the broader social group of Hill Dalit. At the time of the 2011 Nepal census, 6,791 people (0.0% of the population of Nepal) were Gaine/Gandarbha. The frequency of Gaine/Gandarbha by province was as follows:

- Gandaki Province (0.1%)
- Karnali Province (0.1%)
- Lumbini Province (0.1%)
- Bagmati Province (0.0%)
- Koshi Province (0.0%)
- Madhesh Province (0.0%)
- Sudurpashchim Province (0.0%)

The frequency of Gaine/Gandarbha was higher than national average (0.0%) in the following districts:

- Surkhet (0.2%)
- Arghakhanchi (0.1%)
- Baglung (0.1%)
- Banke (0.1%)
- Bardiya (0.1%)
- Chitwan (0.1%)
- Dang (0.1%)
- Gorkha (0.1%)
- Gulmi (0.1%)
- Jajarkot (0.1%)
- Kaski (0.1%)
- Lamjung (0.1%)
- Palpa (0.1%)
- Pyuthan (0.1%)
- Salyan (0.1%)
- Tanahun (0.1%)

== Popular Gandarbhas ==
- Jhalak Man Gandarbha

== See also ==
- Gandharva
- Damai
- Purna Bahadur Ko Sarangi - A 2024 film about a Gandarbha man and his son
