= Tungna =

Nepali Folk instrument

Tungana
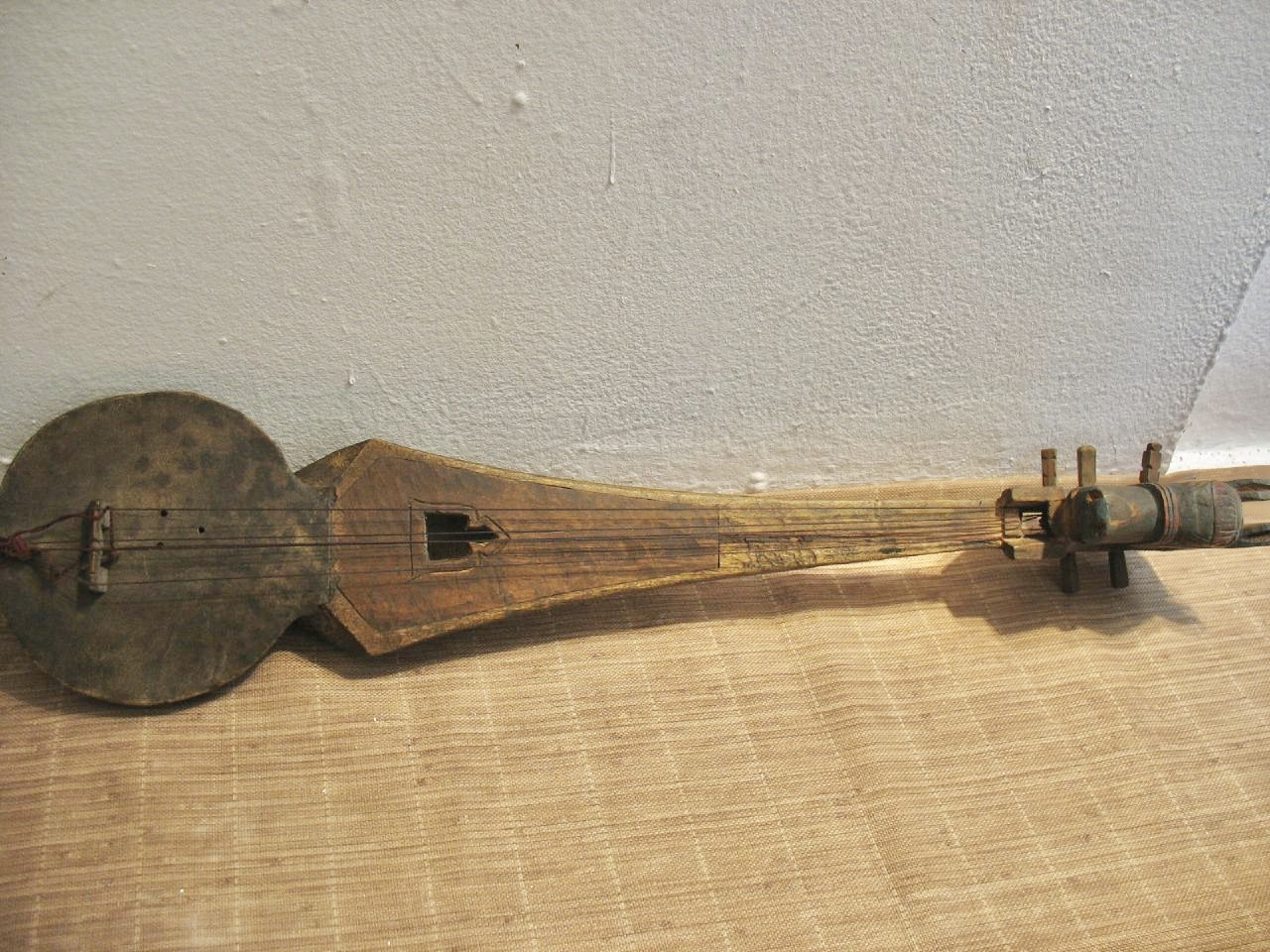
- Tungana or Tungna
- Other names: Tungna; sgra-snyan (Tibet)
- Classification: String instrument (plucked)
- Hornbostel–Sachs classification: 321.322 (necked box lute) (Chordophone)
- Developed: Nepal and Bhutan

Related instruments
- Arbajo; Dotara; Dranyen; Kabuli rubab; Pamiri rubab; Sarod; Seni rebab

The Tungna a plucked string instrument from the Northern Himalayan region: Nepal, Tibet, Sikkim and Bhutan. It is made from a single piece of carved wood. The front hollow body (which serves as the sound-box) is covered with stretched animal skin on which the 'bridge' sits. The Tungna has four strings which is anchored to the keys and body at both ends and the 'bridge' acts as a cantilever thus maintaining the tension of the strings.

It is mostly played by the people in the Himalayan Kingdom of Nepal mainly by the Tamang, Gurung and Sherpa people during auspicious occasions, gatherings and festivals. The musicians play the Tungna and sing songs, which they compose themselves especially to welcome the New Year or during the harvest season. Most households of this mountain region have at least one Tungna in their house.

== See also ==
Similar historical instruments

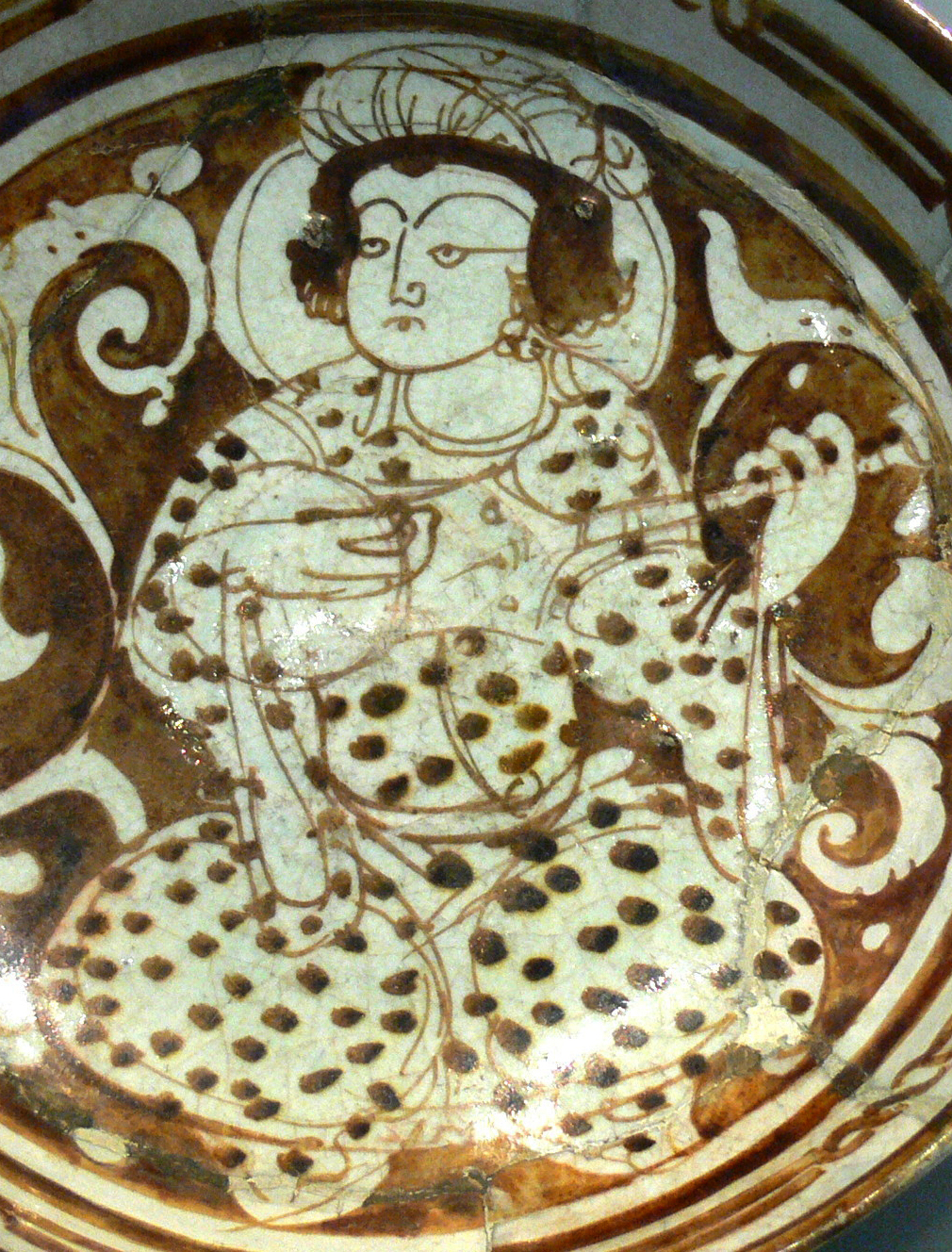
Iranian style rubab from the 13th century C.E., found in Rayy (near Tehran, Iran).

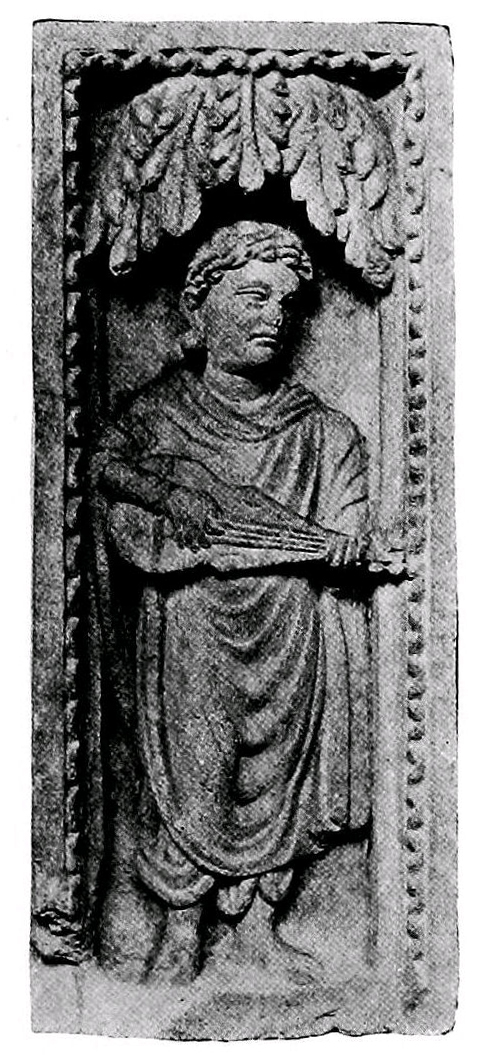
Kushan Empire, 1st to 3rd century. Lute or vina, from the Yusufzai district near Peshawar. Greco Buddhist (Gandhara School). Resembles rubab, sarod and tungna.

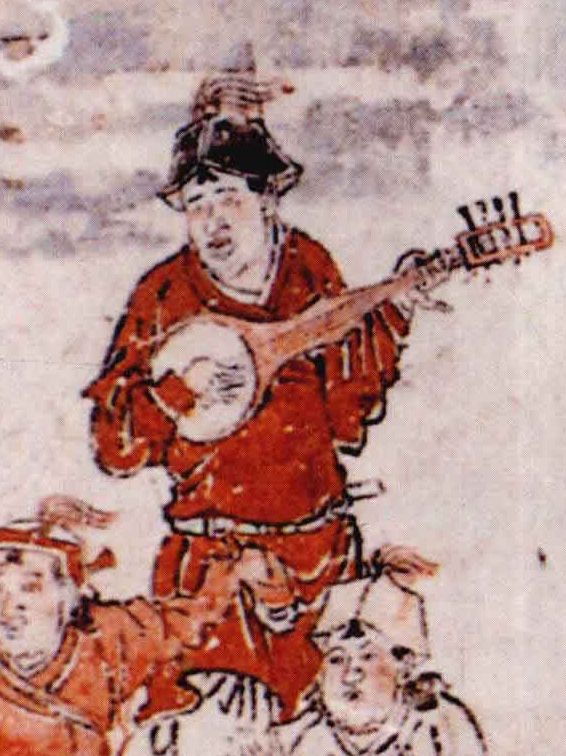
Mongolian lute, circa 1297, Tomb of Wang Qing, China

- Navneet Aditya Waiba
- Music of Nepal
- Dramyin
- Arbajo
