= Project Sarangi =

Foundation promoting indigenous Nepali music

- Native name: प्रोजेक्ट सारंगी
- Company type: Music
- Industry: Musical instruments
- Founded: 2012; 13 years ago in Kathmandu, Nepal
- Founder: Kiran Nepali
- Headquarters: Kathmandu, Nepal
- Products: Nepali sarangi
- Services: Education and training in sarangi playing

Project Sarangi (Nepali: प्रोजेक्ट सारंगी) is a Nepali foundation that is dedicated to the preservation and promotion of indigenous Nepali folk music craftsmanship. It provides tutorials in the playing of Nepali Sarangi and other Nepali folk instruments. Project Sarangi is based in Kathmandu, Nepal and was founded by sarangi player Kiran Nepali in 2012.

Kiran Nepali is a third generation musician and plays sarangi with folk acts Navneet Aditya Waiba, Kutumba, Bipul Chettri and Playing for Change.

== History ==
=== Beginnings ===
Kiran Nepali founded the institute in 2012 at his home in Kirtipur and later moved to Lalitpur in Kathmandu where the project's office is based and classes conducted. In addition to music tutorials Project Sarangi also manufactures a variety of Nepali sarangis from its factory in Kirtipur.

=== Jamarko ===
The project organizes a free Nepali folk music event called 'Jamarko' every year in Kathmandu where various folk bands and artists congregate and showcase their art. Diverse Nepali folk instruments are exhibited during this workshop.

== Factory ==
All Project Sarangi instruments are traditionally handmade from a single block of wood and come in four beginner to professional levels.

== See also ==
- Navneet Aditya Waiba
- Kutumba
- Nepali Sarangi
