= Rawap =

Uyghur string instrument of Eastern Iranian origin

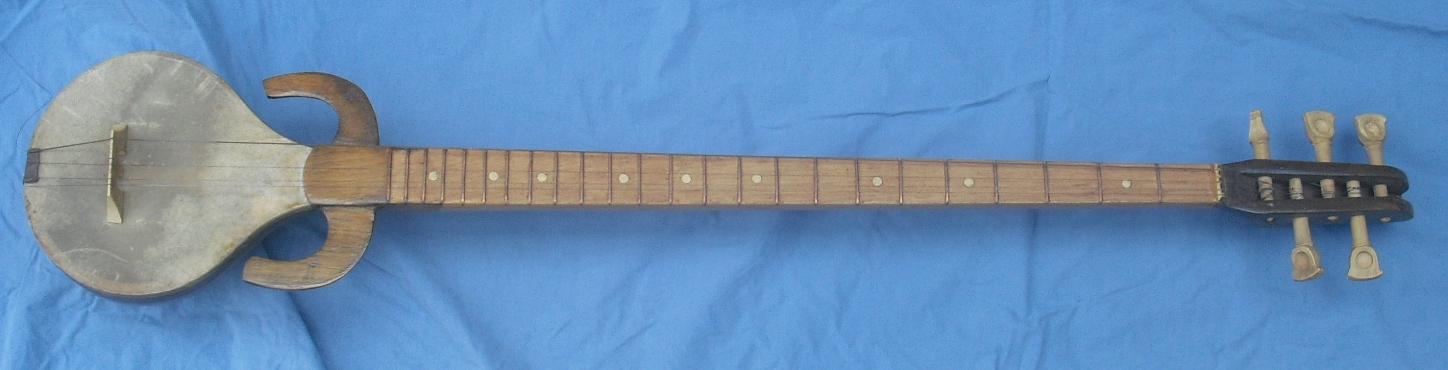
- Rawap front view

String instrument

Related instruments
- Rubab; Domra; Pandura; Tambura; Dranyen

Rawap

Uyghur name
- Uyghur: راۋاپ

Chinese name
- Traditional Chinese: 熱瓦甫
- Simplified Chinese: 热瓦甫
Transcriptions
Standard Mandarin
- Hanyu Pinyin: Rèwǎfǔ
- Wade–Giles: Je^{4}-wa^{3}-fu^{3}
- IPA: [ɻɤ̌wàfù]

Alternative Chinese name
- Traditional Chinese: 熱瓦普
- Simplified Chinese: 热瓦普
Transcriptions
Standard Mandarin
- Hanyu Pinyin: Rèwǎpǔ
- Wade–Giles: Je^{4}-wa^{3}-p'u^{3}
- IPA: [ɻɤ̂wàpʰù]

Second alternative Chinese name
- Traditional Chinese: 拉瓦波
- Simplified Chinese: 拉瓦波
Transcriptions
Standard Mandarin
- Hanyu Pinyin: Lāwǎbō
- Wade–Giles: La^{1}-wa^{3}-po^{1}
- IPA: [láwàpwó]

Third alternative Chinese name
- Traditional Chinese: 喇巴卜
- Simplified Chinese: 喇巴卜
Transcriptions
Standard Mandarin
- Hanyu Pinyin: Lǎbābo
- Wade–Giles: La^{3}-pa^{1}-po
- IPA: [làpápwo]

The rawap (Uyghur: راۋاپ) is a variant of the rubab used in traditional Uyghur music of Xinjiang, China.

== Characteristics ==
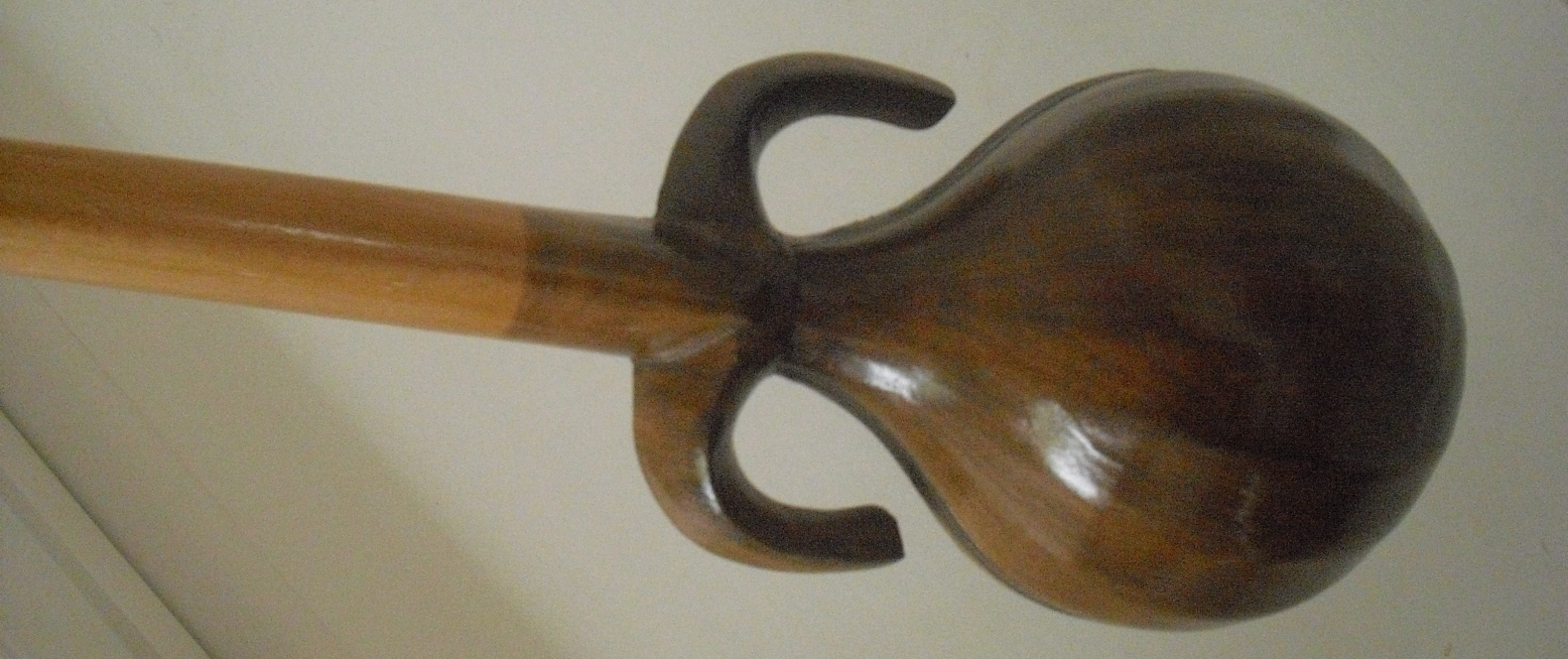
View of the back of the body and neck of a rawap

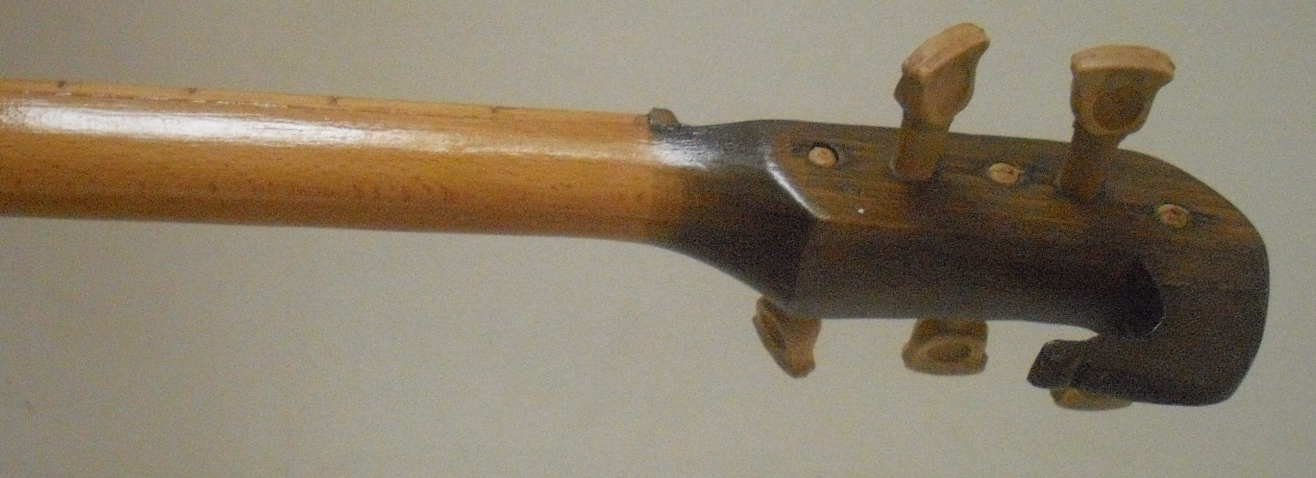
View of the back of the neck and peghead of a rawap

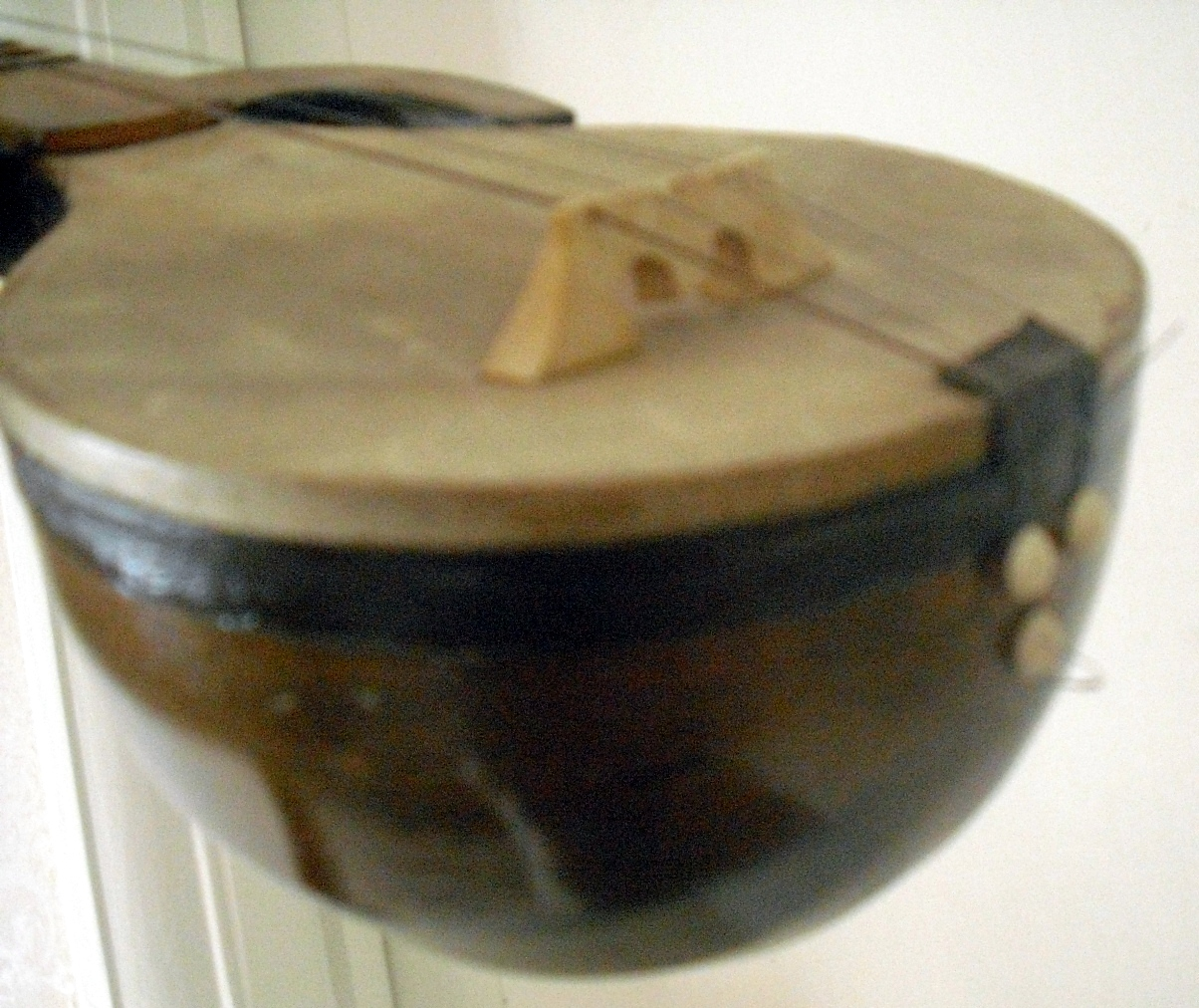
View of the end of the body of a rawap, showing the bridge and where the strings are attached at the end of the body

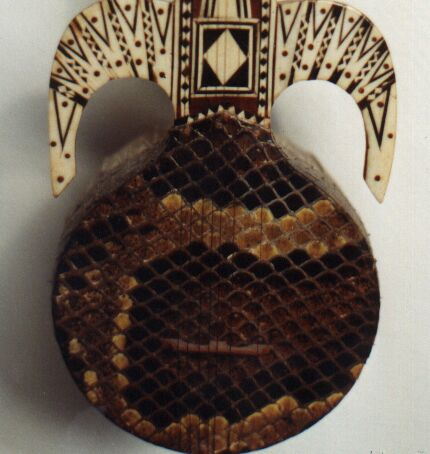
Rawap body covered with snakeskin and stylized with horns

The body of the instrument is a constructed box, a bowl (like the Neapolitan mandolin or the lute), or else the neck and bowl are carved from a single piece of mulberry wood. It is used to accompany songs, and is less common with larger instrumentation. Instead of a wooden soundboard, the opening across the top of the bowl has a dried snakeskin stretched across like on a banjo; alternatively, the hide of a donkey or sheep is used. It is strung with between three and nine strings, which run across the skin membrane on the bottom, up the long fretboard and connect to a pegbox, curved backward 180 degrees. Only some strings are struck with a plectrum. The rest are sympathetic strings, vibrating in reaction to the actively played strings. Something that sets this instrument apart visually are lateral extension above the wooden bowl, decorated goat horns mounted on the neck, curving toward the bowl. The neck is inlaid decorated. While the fingerboard is not fretted, photos of the instruments show that some instruments do have strings tied around the neck in the position of frets.

== Variations ==
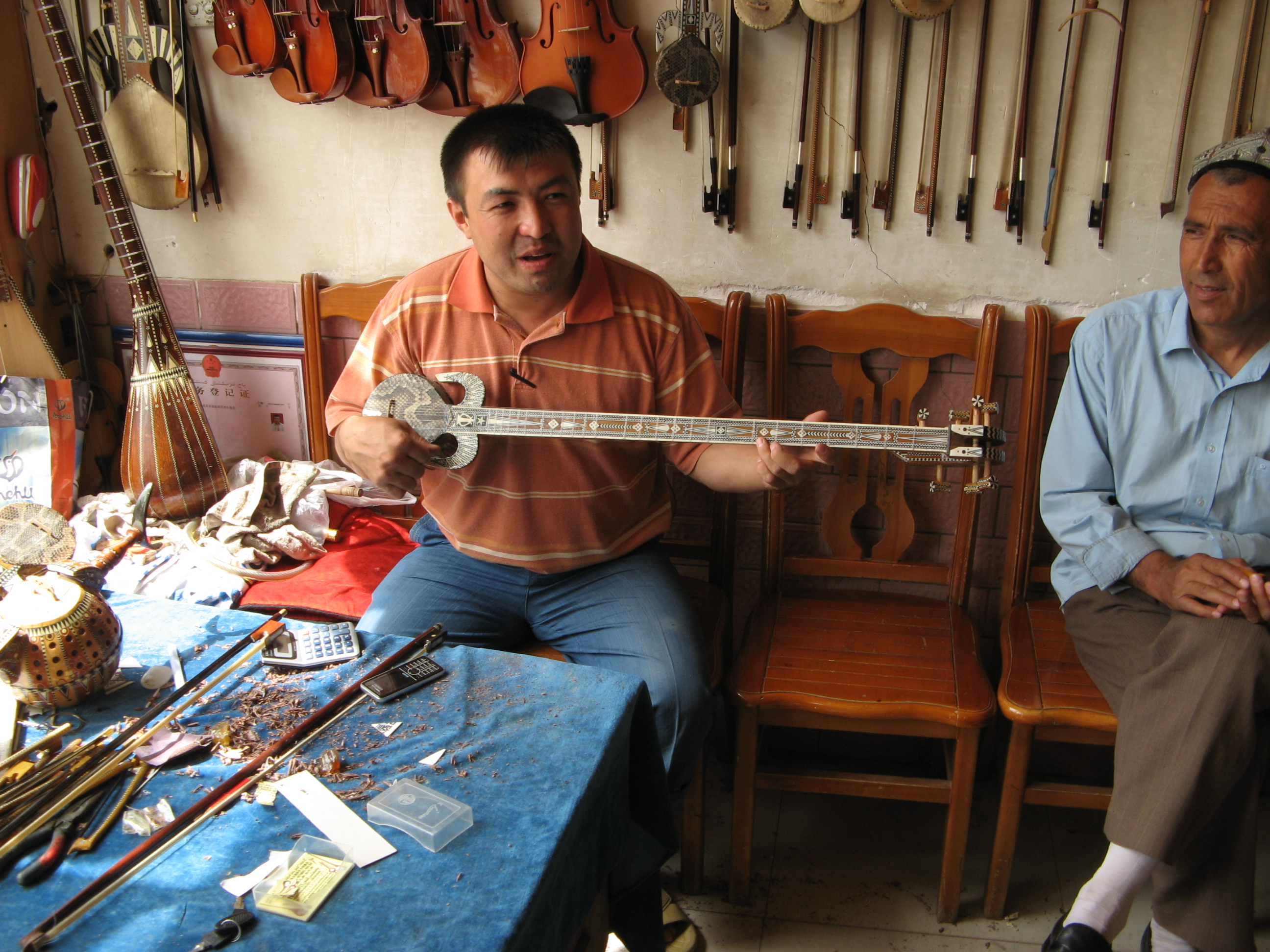
A man playing a rawap in a shop in Kashgar, Xinjiang, China

What the rawap is called among the Uyghurs varies according to each region, with names added as accessories. For example Kaxgar-Rawap is the variation of the town Kashgar. The design, size and style of play differ from one region to another. The Kaschgar-region instrument is 90 centimeters long, with strings tuned in fourths and fifths.

The rawap of the Dolan-population in the province Turpan has five melody strings. The first string is fingered and the others are resonance strings and drone strings.

For the Tajiks, the original instrument is called rubob and is made from the wood of the apricot tree. The Tajik original model is about 70 centimeters long. In the 1930s, the Uzbeks who borrowed from the original Tajik model, created a long-necked lute (rubap). The different forms are related to the rubob, an instrument Afghanistan which was part of ancient Iran.

== Description ==
Similar to a lute, it has 7 strings in 3 courses. Uyghur rawaps have decorative goat horns above the body of the instrument and the body may be covered in hide or snakeskin.

There are several varieties of the rawap, among them:

- Kasgar Rawap 90 centimeters long 5, 6 or 7 strings, one used the rest sympathetic
- Dolan Rawap – similar to the Afghan rubab, Dolan Muqam, one melody string, the rest sympathetic, pear shaped body
- Qoychi Rawap – short herder's rawap Hotan region, 70 centimeters long, 2–3 pairs sheep gut strings
- Qumul Rawap – used in Qumul Muqam
- Bas Rawap – three strings
- Caplima Rawap
