= Aarbajo =

Nepali four-string lute

Arbajo आरबाजो
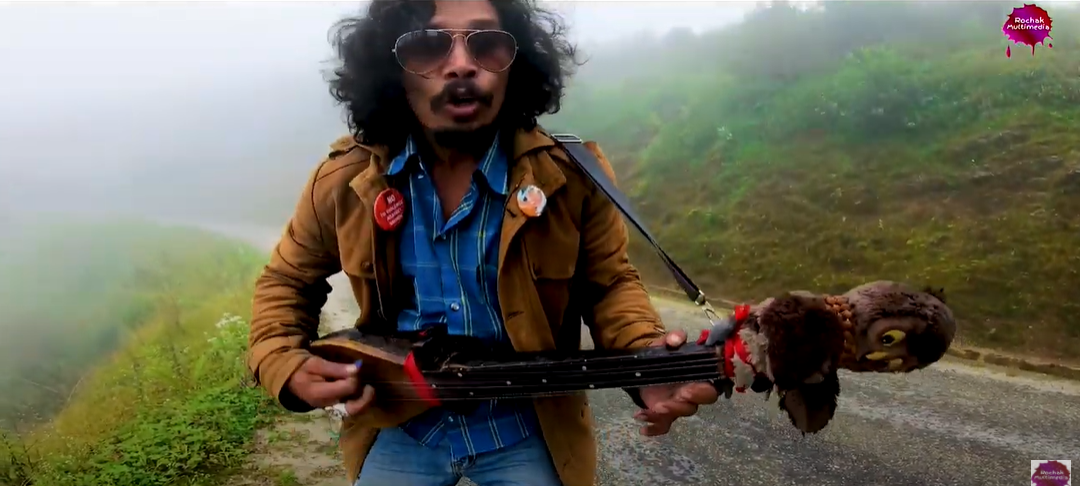
- Nepali entertainer Prakash Gandharva playing the arbajo. Gandharva is holding and playing the instrument like a guitar, a non-traditional method. Traditionally the instrument was held and played vertically, resting on the musician's lap.

String instrument
- Classification: String
- Hornbostel–Sachs classification: 321.321-6 (Chordophone with permanently attached resonator and neck, sounded by a plectrum)
- Developed: Traditionally built by members of the Gandarbha caste of musical performers.
- Attack: fast
- Decay: fast

Playing range
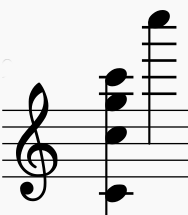
- Range of the Nepali arbajo, low c, middle c and g, high c

The arbajo (Nepali: आरबाजो) is a Nepali four-string lute used as a rhythm instrument (Tālabājā (Nepali: तालबाजा)). It is the traditional instrument of the Gandarbha caste of musical performers, and is considered a companion to the Nepali sarangi. The Gandarbhas consider the aarbajo to be the "male instrument", the sarangi the "female." The aarbajo is used less than in the past, and been replaced by the sarangi, which was considered in 1999 to have superseded the aarbajo in common use.

The instrument has historically been played by Gandarbha performers at festivals, such as the "Chaiteti" festival. Although considered the oldest of the Gandarbha musical instruments, the aarbajo is in danger of dying out today. The danger for the instrument comes as young people are not as interested in folk music, and the instrument is not passed to the next generation. Some of the few musicians still playing the aarbajo are of the Gaine caste, in Lamjung District and Kaski District of western Nepal.

== Specifications ==
The instrument measures approximately 100 centimeters long, and is about 22 centimeters wide at the bowl. The bowl is about 17 centimeters deep. The whole instrument is carved from a single piece of Khirro wood (Sapium insigne). Its four strings are tuned to "lower C, middle C and G and higher C," over three octaves. It has a skin soundboard.

== Similarities to other instruments ==
The Asrbajo uses skin for its soundboard, an ancient international lute-building tradition. This tradition has also survived in the Nepali tungna. Skin-topped instruments have survived in China, South Asia, Southeast Asia, the Middle East, and Africa. As the aarbajo is viewed, standing upright, it has projections from the neck just above the bowl, similar to instruments from elsewhere in the mountains of Asia, including the Tibetan dranyen, Pamiri rubab and the Uyghur rawap.

== Prominent performers ==
Both the aarbajo and Nepali sarangi were performed on the BBC radio network in 2019 by Prakash Gandharva, in a radio entertainment targeting poaching. Gandharva worked on the show for 7 years.

The show was organized by "Greenhood Nepal", and environment group in Nepal that focuses on "communities that border important wildlife habitats." Gandharva's songs and instrumental performances were used to illustrate the stories of people who ended up in jail for poaching. The songs also explored what happens in the world when an animal disappears from the forest. The entertainment was aimed reaching people with the environmental message.

== See also ==
- Dramyin
- Tungna
