= Dotara =

Stringed musical instrument

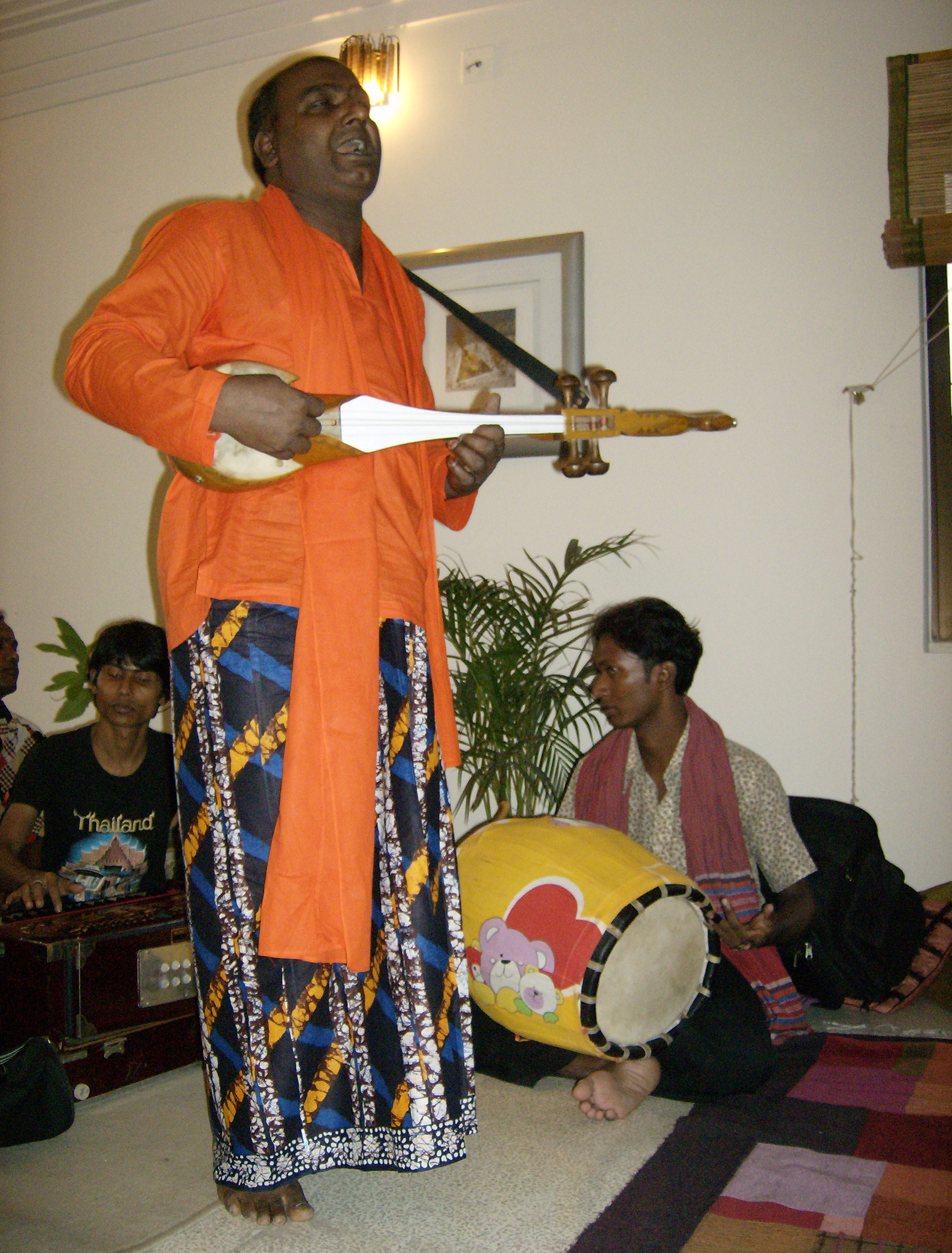
A folk musician playing Dotara in Dhaka, Bangladesh

The dotara or dotar (Assamese: দোতোৰা dütüra, দোতৰা dütora, Bengali: দোতারা; Rangpuri: দোতোৰা/দোতোরা dotora), (literally, “Of [or ‘having’] two strings”) is a two-stringed, plucked musical instrument from South Asia, with most contemporary models having four playing strings (similar to the sarod). Comparatively, the sarod is a slightly larger and more elaborate instrument, being built with an additional set of resonant sympathetic strings. However, the dotara is still quite resonant and projective of its own sound, due to its rounded shape and overall construction. It is commonly played in Bangladesh, where it is the national instrument and the Indian states of Assam, West Bengal and Bihar. It was mentioned in a 14th-century Saptakanda Ramayana. Later, it was adopted by the ascetic cults of Bauls and Fakirs. Today, it is also used to play Hindustani Classical Ragas.

== Etymology ==
The word is from Eastern Indo-Aryan (do târ), literally "two strings", or “double-stringed”, with the suffix “-a” indicating “having, -ed”. The instrument is known as dotara or dütara (Bengali: দোতারা, Assamese: দোতাৰা) and dütüra (Assamese: দোতোৰা). Additionally, it was believed to have been called dotara due to the strings being of equal pitch in tuning.

== History ==
Madhava Kandali, 14th century Assamese poet and writer of Saptakanda Ramayana, lists several instruments in his version of "Ramayana", such as Dotara, mardala, tabal, jhajhar etc.

== Construction ==
The dotara is a plucked stringed instrument, played in an open note combination, often played alongside folk percussive instruments such as Dhol, Khhol or Mandira. It is made out of neem or other hardwood, with an elongated, roundish belly for a soundbox, which tapers to a narrow neck culminating in a peg box which is often elaborately carved in the shape of a peacock-head, swan-head or other animal motifs. The fingerboard is fretless and made of brass or steel, as in a sarod. The soundbox of the instrument is covered with a tightly stretched kidskin or lizard-skin, as in a rabaab or a sarod.

== Tuning ==
With four strings, the dotara is tuned as follows (from top to bottom)—Soh (lower)-Do-Do-Fah. The Indian notation would read: Pa - Sa - Sa - Ma with Do/Sa being the tonic/root note of the song.

== See also ==
- Dutar
- Sarod
