= Reed (mouthpiece) =

Sound-producing part of some musical instruments

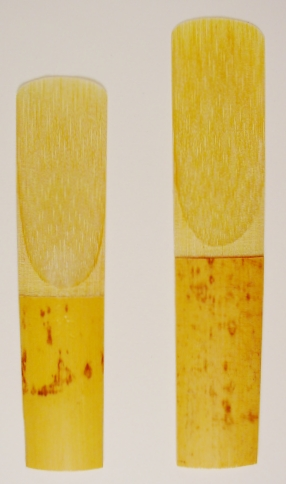
Alto and tenor saxophone reeds.

A reed (or lamella) is a thin strip of material that vibrates to produce a sound on a musical instrument. Most woodwind instrument reeds are made from Arundo donax ("Giant cane") or synthetic material. Tuned reeds (as in harmonicas and accordions) are made of metal or synthetics. Musical instruments are classified according to the type and number of reeds.

The earliest types of single-reed instruments used idioglottal reeds, where the vibrating reed is a tongue cut and shaped on the tube of cane. Much later, single-reed instruments started using heteroglottal reeds, which are cut and separated from the tube of cane and attached to some type of mouthpiece. By contrast, in an uncapped double reed instrument (such as the oboe and bassoon), there is no mouthpiece; the two parts of the reed vibrate against one another.

== Single reeds ==
Single reeds are used on the mouthpieces of clarinets and saxophones. They are roughly rectangular, with a tip that is rounded to match the shape of the mouthpiece. The back of the reed is flat to sit flat on the mouthpiece table, and the reed's thickness tapers to a thin tip. All single reeds are shaped similarly but vary in size to fit each instrument's mouthpiece.

Reeds designed for the same instrument look roughly identical, but vary in thickness ("hardness" or "strength"). Hardness is generally measured on a scale of 1 through 5 from softest to hardest. This is not a standardized scale and reed strengths vary by manufacturer. The thickness of the tip and heel, as well as the profile in between, affect the sound and playability. Pieces of cane that differ in stiffness will respond differently even if cut with the same profile.

== Construction ==
The cane used to make reeds for single-reed instruments is grown in the southern coastal regions of France and Spain and, in the last 30 years, in the Cuyo area of Argentina. After the cane is cut it is placed in direct sunlight for about a month to dry. The cane is rotated regularly to ensure even and complete drying. Once dry, the cane is stored in a warehouse. As production requires, cane is taken to a factory's cutting department, where it is cut into tubes graded by diameter and wall thickness. The tubes are cut into splits and made into reed blanks. Blanks are tapered and profiled into reeds using blades or CNC machines. Completed reeds are graded for strength by machine.

== Double reeds ==
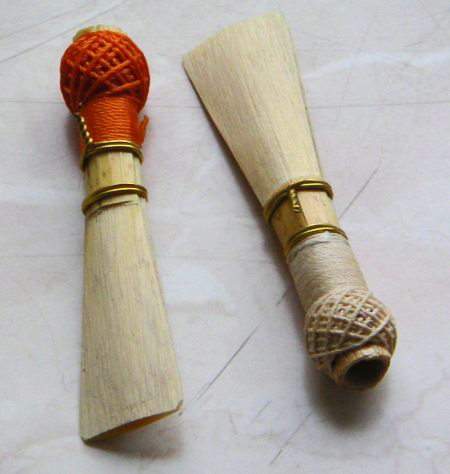
Bassoon double reeds.

Double reeds are used on many instruments, such as the oboe, oboe d'amore, English horn, bass oboe, heckelphone, bassoon, contrabassoon, sarrusophone, shawm, bagpipes, nadaswaram and shehnai and others. The two reeds vibrate against each other and not against a mouthpiece. In the case of the crumhorn, bagpipes, and Rauschpfeife, a reed cap encloses the reeds, and the reeds do not contact the player's mouth.

=== Manufacturing ===
Double reed manufacturing begins the same way as that of single reeds. Arundo donax cane is collected, dried, processed, cut to manageable sizes, and separated into various diameters. The most common diameters for American-style oboe reeds are: 9.5–10 mm (0.37–0.39 in), 10–10.5 mm (0.39–0.41 in), and 10.5–11 mm (0.41–0.43 in). Many American oboists prefer one diameter at one time of the year and a different diameter at other times.

The tubes are split into three equal parts and the pieces that are not warped are chosen. A reed made from warped cane will not vibrate consistently on both sides. The split pieces are gouged by machine to remove many layers and drastically decrease thickness, which eases the scraping process for the reed-maker.

Finally, the gouged pieces of cane are soaked, shaped on a shaper with razor blades, and allowed to dry before the final steps. The shaped piece of cane is then re-soaked and tied onto a "staple" for oboe reeds or formed on a mandrel for bassoon reeds. Double reeds are tied in place with thread. Finishing both bassoon and oboe reeds requires the reed-maker to scrape along the cane section of the reed with a scraping knife to specific dimensions and lengths depending on the reed style and the musician's preference. Bassoon and oboe reeds are finished when the reeds play in tune or can make a sufficient "crow"-like noise.

== Quadruple reeds ==
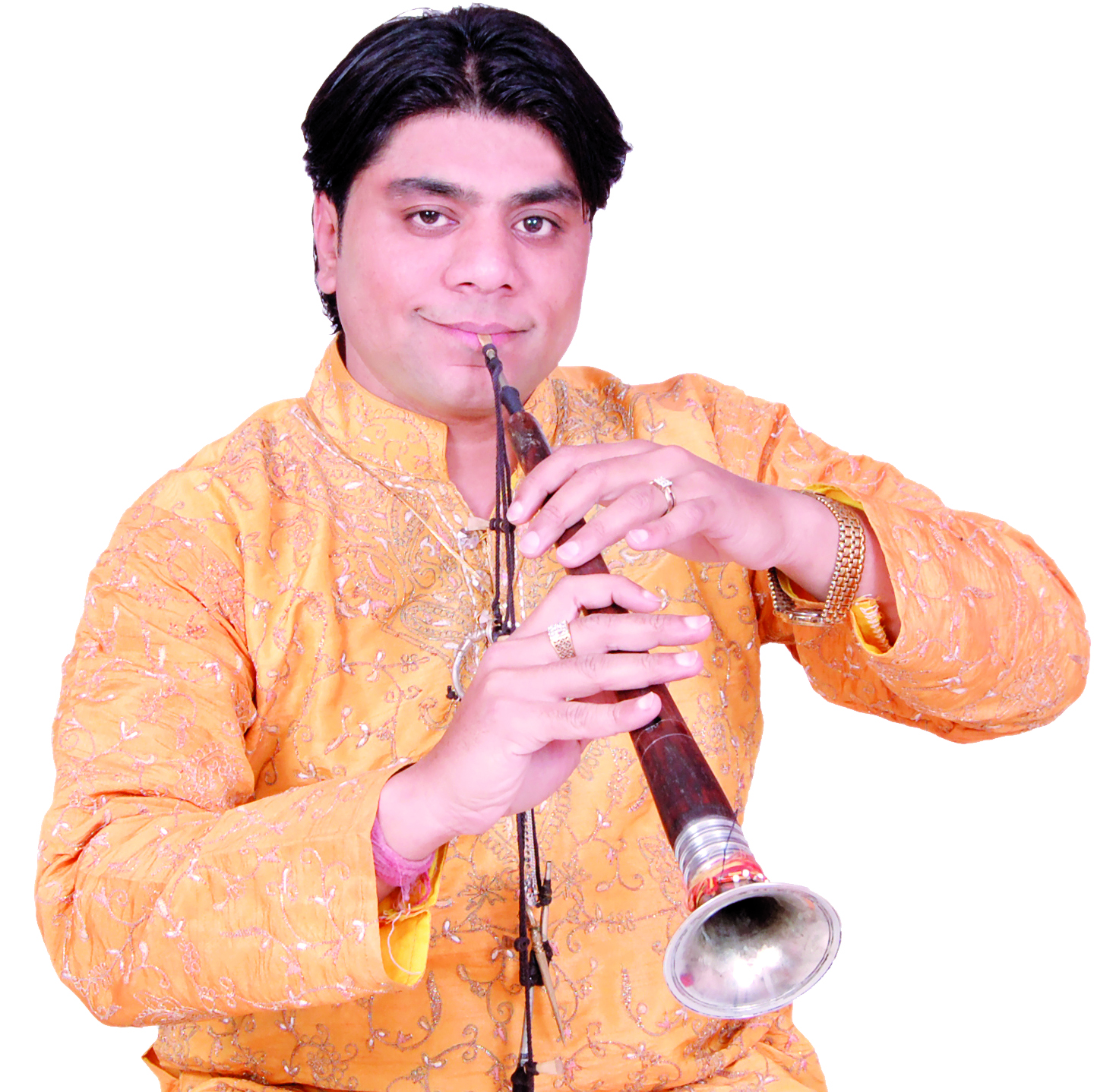
The four reed shehnai is one of the most recognized instruments of India

Quadruple reed instruments have four reeds, two on top and two on bottom. Examples of this include an archetypal instrument from India, the shehnai, as well as the pi from Thailand, and the Cambodian sralai. Having four reeds instead of two produces a very different tone and set of harmonics.

== Free reeds ==
There are two types of free reeds: framed and unframed. Framed free reeds are used on ancient East Asian instruments such as the Chinese shēng and Japanese shō, ancient Southeast Asian instruments like the Laotian khene, and modern European instruments such as the harmonium or reed organ (consisting of reed pipes), harmonica, concertina, bandoneón, accordion, and Russian bayan. The reed is made from cane, willow, brass, or steel, and is enclosed in a rigid frame. The pitch of the framed free reed is fixed.

The ancient bullroarer is an unframed free reed made of a stone or wooden board tied to a rope that is swung around through the air to make a whistling sound. Another primitive unframed free-reed instrument is the leaf (the bilu), used in some traditional Chinese music ensembles. A leaf or long blade of grass is stretched between the sides of the thumbs and tensioned slightly by bending the thumbs to change the pitch. The tone can be modified by cupping the hands to provide a resonant chamber.

== Materials ==
Most woodwind instrument reeds are made from cane, but there are synthetic reeds for clarinet, saxophone, double reed instruments, and bagpipes. Synthetic reeds are more durable and do not need to be moistened before playing.

Recently, synthetic reeds have been made from synthetic polymer compounds, and from a combination of cane and synthetics.. Synthetic reeds are often more durable and consistent than cane reeds, however some musicians prefer the sound of cane reeds over synthetics.

The dizi, a Chinese transverse flute, has a distinctive kind of reed (a di mo), which is made from a paper-like bamboo membrane.

== Commercial vs. handmade ==
Musicians originally crafted reeds from cane using simple tools, a time-consuming and painstaking process. Specialized tools for cutting and trimming reeds by hand reduce the time needed to finish a reed. Today, nearly all single-reed instrument players buy manufactured reeds, though many adjust them by shaving or sanding. Some professionals make single reeds from blanks, but this is time-consuming and can require expensive equipment. Among double reed players, advanced and professional players typically make their own reeds, while beginners and students often buy reeds, either from their teachers or from commercial sources.

== Care and maintenance ==
The playing characteristics of cane reeds are susceptible to changes in temperature and humidity.

Manufacturers produce reeds in different strengths, indicated by a number (most commonly 2, 2.5, 3, 3.5, 4, 4.5, and 5). The strength is determined by a machine that presses against the vamp (the part that includes the tip and the "heart" just behind the tip) of the reed and determines how stiff the reed is. The machine separates the reeds according to hardness. Individual reeds graded with the same strength/hardness will vary in their playing characteristics. If a reed is too hard, sections of it can be adjusted using blades, scrapers, or abrasives.

== "Reed players" ==
Musical theatre orchestras call for woodwind players to each play several different instruments from the single-reed, flute, and double-reed families. In this context, these players are commonly referred to as "reed players". An individual part may call for only one or two instruments, or many more (the "Reed 3" part in Bernstein's West Side Story calls for piccolo, flute, oboe, English horn, clarinet, bass clarinet, and tenor and baritone saxophones).

== See also ==
- Reed aerophones
- Free-reed instrument
- Mouthpiece (woodwind)
- Uilleann pipes reed-making workshops in Ireland.
