= Parthian music =

Music of the Parthian Empire (247 BCE – 224 CE)

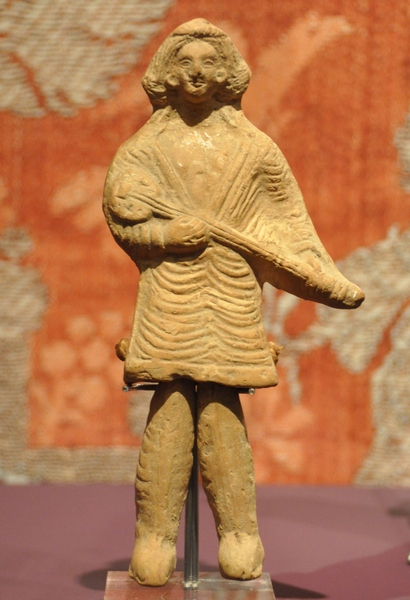
Small terracotta sculpture of a Parthian musician playing a tanbur (Note: Kept in the Rijksmuseum van Oudheden, found in Iran. Inv. Nr.: B 1952/2.1)

The Parthian Empire, a major state of ancient Iran, lasted from 247 BCE to 224 CE, in which music played a prominent role. It featured in festivals, weddings, education, warfare and other social gatherings. Surviving artistic records indicate that it involved both men and women, who could be instrumentalists or singers. Along with the older music of the previous Medians, Assyrians and particularly the Achaemenid period, Parthian music was crucial in laying the foundation for the golden age of subsequent Sasanian music.

The gōsān (Persian: گوسان) poet-musician minstrels were a central tradition, probably originating in the earlier Achaemenid period. Little is known of them, though Greek commentators recall panegyrical themes in their songs. A wide variety of instruments were used, often to accompany the gōsān. They included both single and double reed wind instruments, such as the panpipes (syrinx), transverse flute, small trumpets and the aulos, as well as string instruments such as the kithara, harps, lyres, lute and tanbur. At least some of these, such as harps, lutes and lyres, originated in earlier periods.

Compared to their Western rival, the Roman Empire, much less is known about the Parthians, but information on music can be gathered from a few Parthian texts, accounts from Greek and Roman writers, some archeological evidence, and a variety of visual sources. The last of these are usually from either the archeological sites and former settlements of Hatra or Nisa, and include terracotta plaques, reliefs and illustrations on drinking horns known as rhytons or in Persian, takuk (Persian: تکوک).

== Background ==
The Parthian Empire in 94 BC at its greatest extent, during the reign of Mithridates II (r. 124–91 BC)

Due to a paucity of surviving records, it is impossible to create a thorough outline of the earliest music in Persia. Music has existed in Persia since at least c. 3300–3100 BCE of the Elam period, from when the earliest artistic depictions of arched harps are dated; it is possible that these instruments existed long before their visual depictions. Later surviving instruments include bull lyres from c. 2450, small Oxus trumpets from c. 2200–1750, and much later, lutes from c. 1300 BCE, which seem to have been popular with the upper class. Rock reliefs of Kul-e Farah from 1st-century BCE, include sophisticated Persian court ensembles, in which the arched harp is central. By the Achaemenid Empire (550–330 BCE), still relatively few records survive. Some speculation and anecdotal evidence suggests the presence of female choirs, as well as the emergence of the gōsān poet-musician minstrel tradition, which would be central in Parthian music.

The Parthian Empire was a major political and cultural power of ancient Iran, existing from c. 247 BCE to 224 CE. At its height, its territory covered modern-day Syria to India, and the Caspian Sea to the Persian Gulf. It is often remembered for its rivalry with the Roman Empire, but compared to its Western opponent, relatively little information is known. Native Parthian textual sources are very minimal, and the primary official records which still exist are Parthian coinage. The few known Parthian texts are usually from the more Western regions, generally written in cuneiform using the Aramaic or Greek language, and less often in Latin, Parthian or Hebrew. Much information about the Parthian Empire comes from foreign commentators, particularly Greeks and Romans—though there are accounts of Parthian history before 141 BCE, though this is extremely limited. These accounts are often inaccurate and heavily biased, which has led to a long held view of the Parthians as "uncultivated and as barbarians". Such a perspective has long prevented the serious study of Parthian culture; the historian Leonardo Gregoratti noted that "The Parthian Empire, a state lasting for five-long centuries, has recently emerged slowly from the shadow of history to regain its cultural and historical identity". Evidence for Parthian music is somewhat limited, but via the visual arts, archeological evidence, as well as both Parthian and foreign texts, numerous trends of the period can be observed.

== Overview ==
=== Sources ===
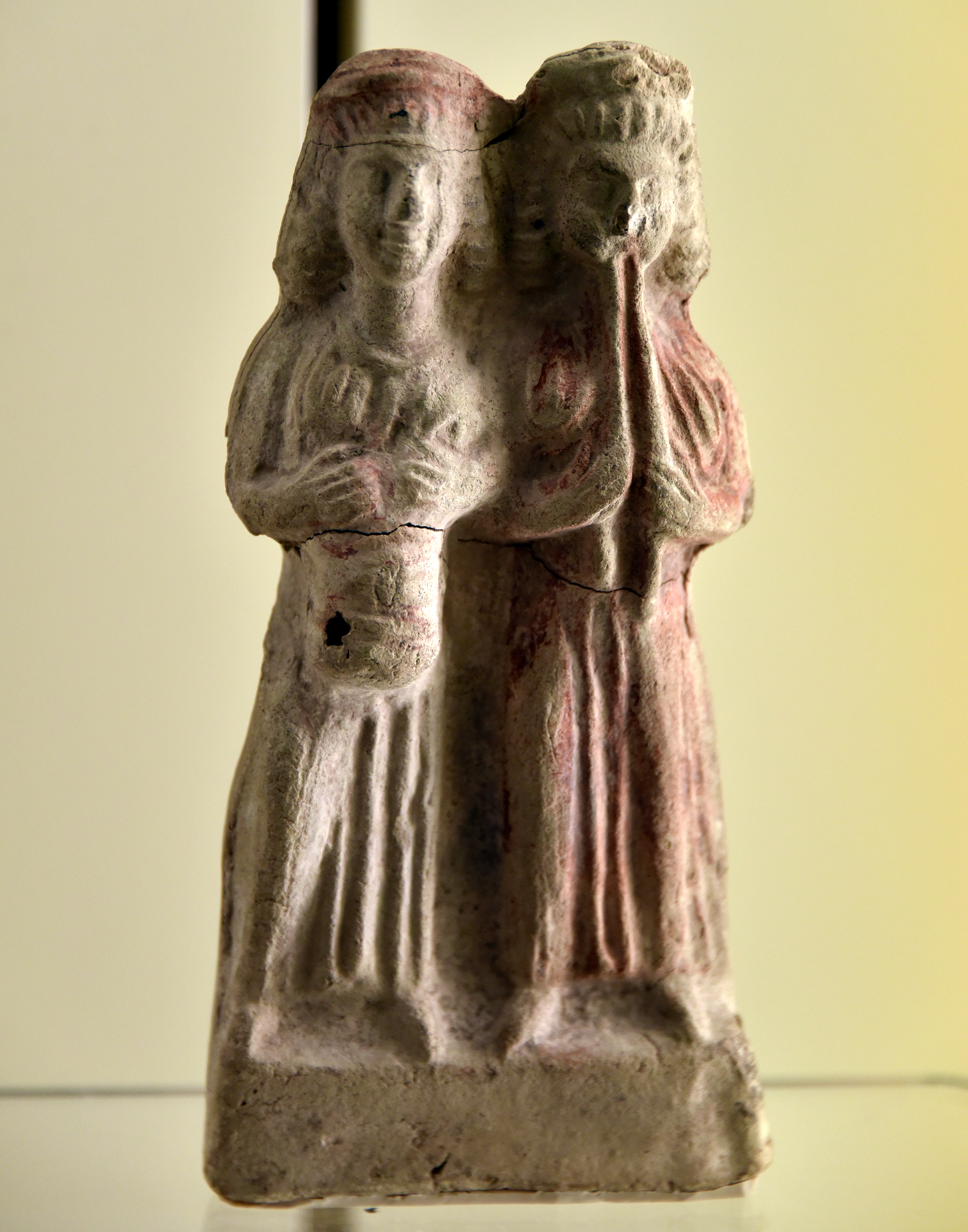
Two musicians of the Parthian period, kept in the Pergamon Museum, Berlin. The musician on the left appears to hold a percussion instrument, while there is a wind instrument on the right

Information on Parthian music use comes from a few Parthian texts, archeological remains and writings from Greek and Roman authors. Depictions in the visual arts of the time often illustrate the instruments discussed in text, but also depict ones which are otherwise unknown. These include depictions of instruments, musicians and ensembles on terracotta plaques, and reliefs. Ivory drinking horns known as rhytons or takuk (Persian: تکوک; also spelled "rhutas"), provide much otherwise unknown musical information, with illustrations described by music archaeologist Bo Lawergren as "most magnificent depictions" of Parthian music. These objects are generally from sites at either Hatra or Nisa. This extant evidence indicates that music played a prominent role in the Parthian Empire. (Note: Ellerbrock 2021, p. 189 notes that most ancient societies, like the Parthians, held music in high regard.) It was part of numerous aspects of Parthian life, finding use in festivals, weddings and warfare, among other social gatherings.

Towards the empire's later period, the first half of the 2nd century saw the increasing presence of Christian music. In particular, the East Syrian liturgy was practiced above the Tigris river, having made its way there through Edessa, Roman Syria (modern-day Urfa, Turkey). This occurred simultaneously with many of the other Parthian music traditions.

=== Instruments and occasions ===
In general, most Parthian instruments seem to be based on those of Greece, Rome and Egypt. Visual depictions indicate that instruments such as the aulos, cithara and the syrinx (pan flute) was used in theater, sacrifices, Dionysian dances and other rituals. According to the Roman historian Herodian, the Parthians danced "to the music of flutes and the throbbing of drums".

Music was standard in the education of Parthian youth. The Greek Geographer Strabo noted that the teachers would even "wake the boys up before dawn by the sound of brazen instruments".

== Specific elements ==
=== Drums ===
The rhoptron drum is among the better known instruments of the Parthians. These large drums were used in warfare, with Plutarch noting that the Parthians "had rightly judged that, of all the senses, hearing is the one most apt to confound the soul, soonest rouses its emotions and most effectively unseats the judgement". The musicologist Thomas J. Mathiesen notes that although the instrument is often rendered in English as tambourine, it more closely resembles a snare drum. He explains that an ensemble of tambourine could not arose the same fear as large snare drums.

The rhoptron is considered an early predecessor of the modern-day Timpani.

=== Minstrels ===
Based on textual and artistic representations, the gōsān (also 'gusan'; Persian: گوسان) minstrel tradition was seemingly prominent in Parthian society, and had probably originated in the earlier Achaemenid period. A gōsān was a poet-musician though there was much variety within the tradition. They would sing in Markets during peacetime, and were probably accompanied by instrumentalists. Essentially nothing is known of their training and extremely little examples of their songs survive. Based on later evidence, their songs would "proclaim the worthiness of kings and heroes of old". This is affirmed by Strabo, who notes in his Geographica (XV.3.18) that young men would sing of "the deeds both of the gods and of the noblest men". In the "Life of Crassus" from his Parallel Lives, Plutarch noted that the gōsān would also ridicule the Romans, as they "sang many scurrilous and ridiculous songs about the effeminacy and cowardice of Crassus".

== Later influence ==
Parthian music, along with that of the Achaemenids, Medes and Assyrians, laid the foundation for subsequent Sasanian music (224–651 CE). The gōsān minstrel tradition continued in the Sasanian empire, where Persian music reached a golden age of patronage and prosperity. It is likely that Parthian songs remained sung long after the Empire's fall, particularly in the north-eastern parts of modern-day Iran. These song may have influenced or been included into the Shahnameh by Ferdowsi.

The Parthian gōsān tradition made a substantial influence on that music of Armenia, where a similar gōsān art developed. The Armenian gōsān sang on similar topics of heroism, which were often performed with instrumental accompaniment.
