= Kèn đám ma =

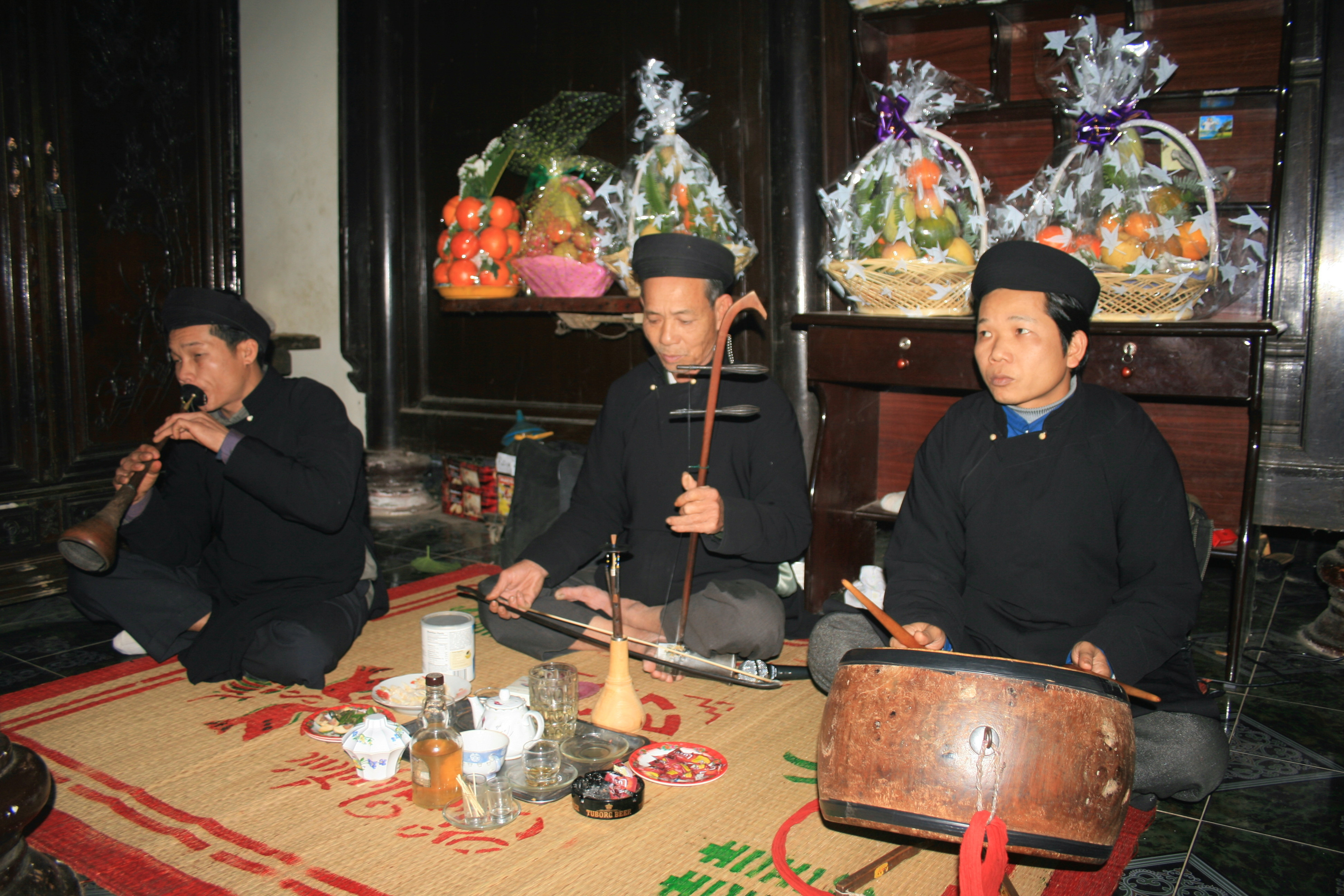
A Vietnamese funeral band. Man on the left playing the kèn đám ma.

The kèn đám ma (Vietnamese: [kɛ̂n ɗǎːm maː], "funeral oboe") is one of several types of kèn, a double reed wind instrument used in the traditional music of northern Vietnam. It has a conical bore and is similar in construction and sound to the Chinese suona and the Korean taepyeongso, however, its musical context is most comparable to that of the Pi Mon, as it is typically used to perform music for funeral processions. This instrument may also be called "Kèn Hiếu" in certain contexts.

== Discography ==
- 1999 - Viet-Nam: Musique Funéraire Du Nord (Arion)

== See also ==
- Kèn bầu
