= Kèn =

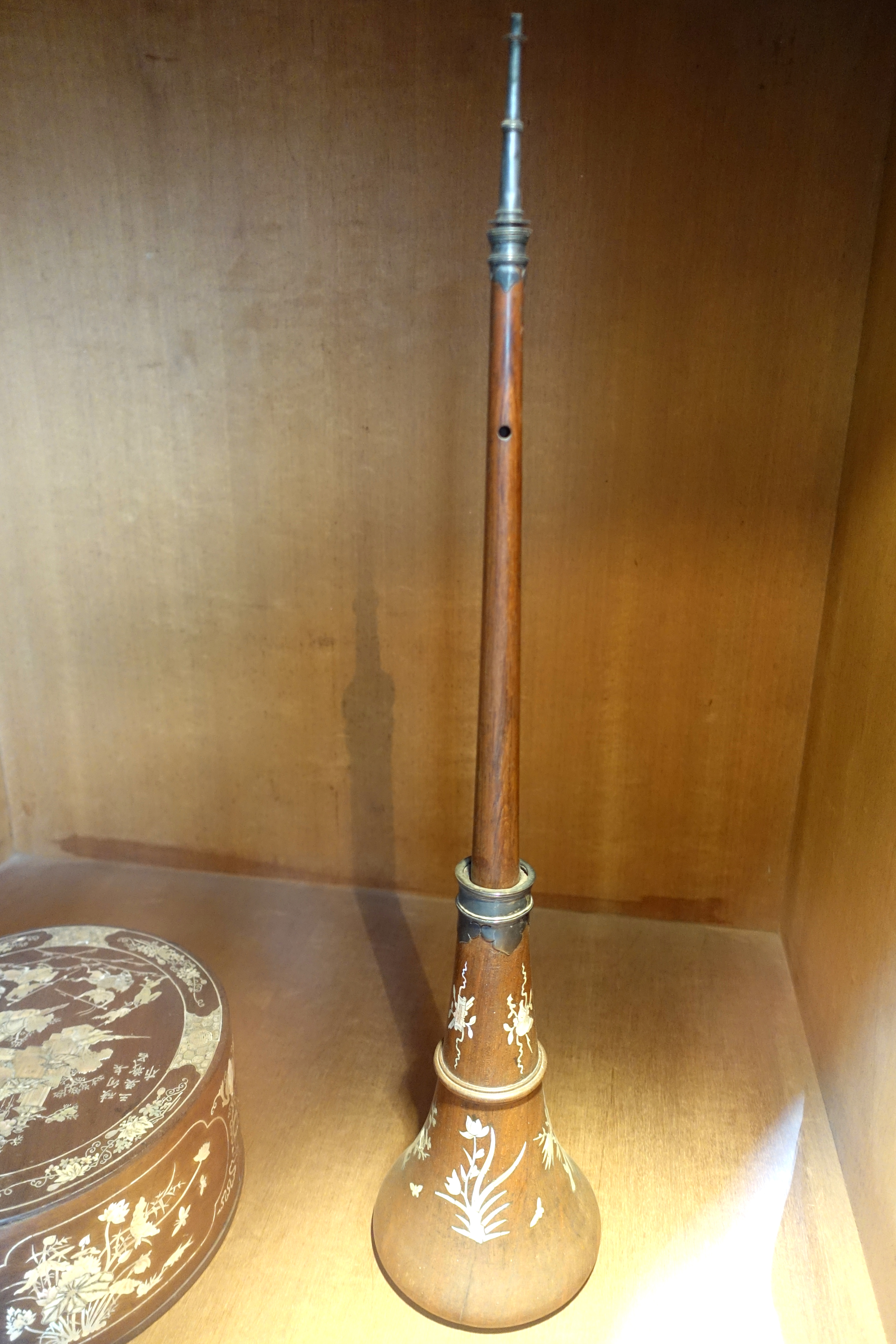
Kèn in the Vietnam Museum of Ethnology

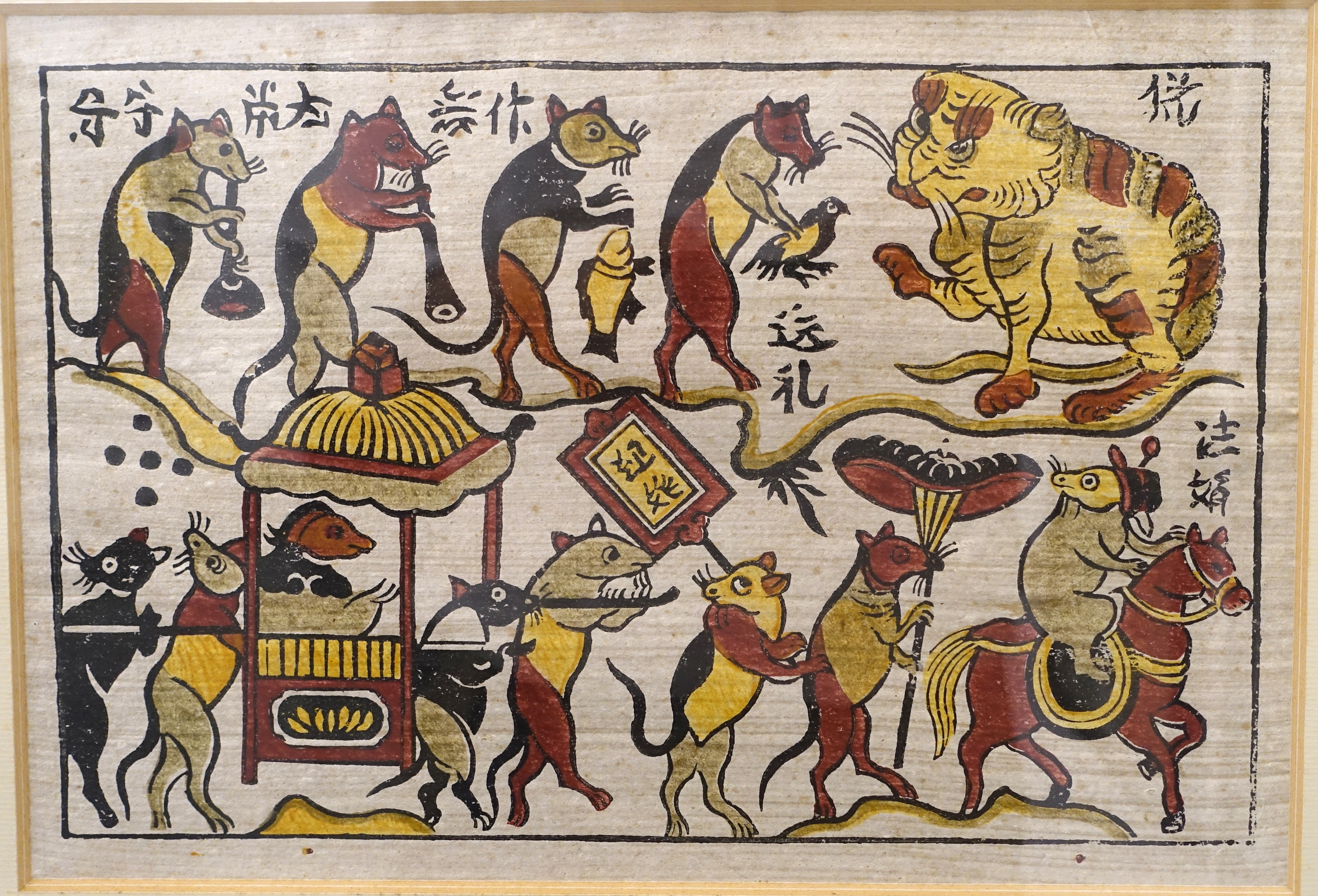
Two rats at the end of the first row in the picture Đám cưới chuột are playing the kèn.

The kèn (Vietnamese: [kɛ̂n]) is an instrument used in traditional Vietnamese music. It has a double reed and a conical wooden body. It produces a powerful and penetrating high-pitched sound, similar to the Chinese suona, the Korean taepyeongso, the Thai Pi, and the Persian/Indian shehnai. Its musical context resembles that of the oboes played by the Tai peoples, who call it the "Pí Lè", and the Muong people, who call it the "Bi". The name "Kèn" is also used to informally refer to Gourd mouth organs.

The best-known player of the kèn is the award-winning musician Nguyễn Ngọc Khánh (b. 1956), who is acknowledged as a "national treasure" in Vietnam, where he is known as "Khánh of the kèn."

== Varieties ==
- Kèn bầu - with a wooden bell carved in a gourd shape; comes in several sizes
- Kèn đám ma - with a metal bell; used for funerals in northern Vietnam
