= Quadruple reed =

Type of reed used for wind instruments

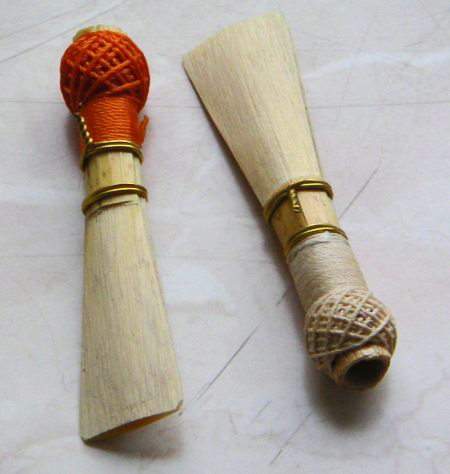
Bassoon double reeds: note the elliptical (oval) opening (bottom left)

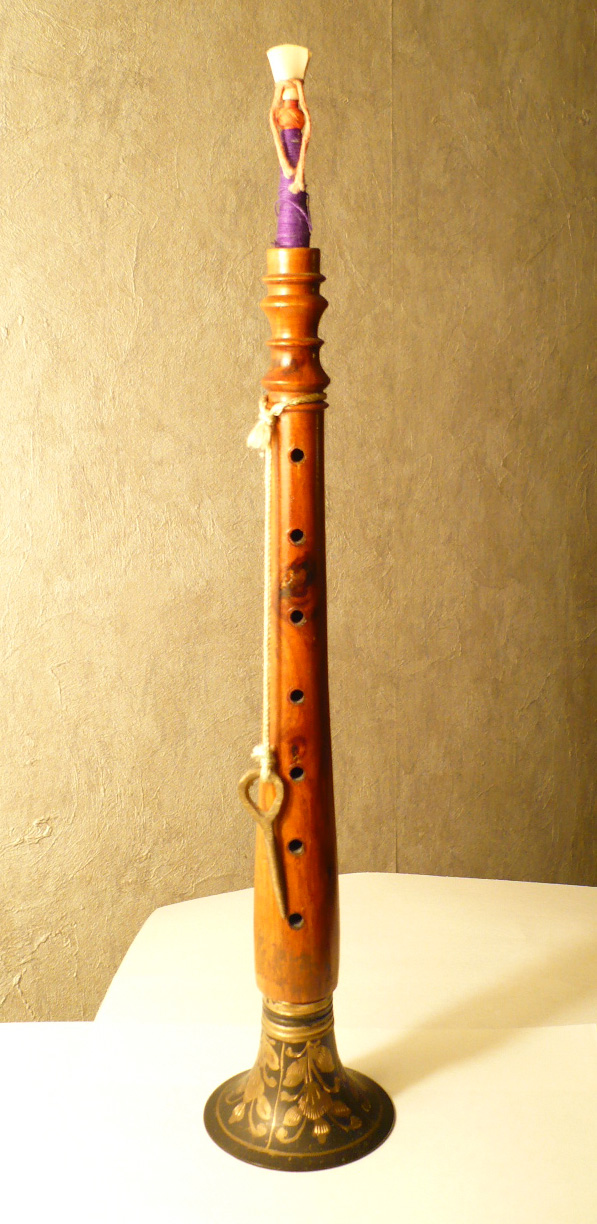
Shehnai

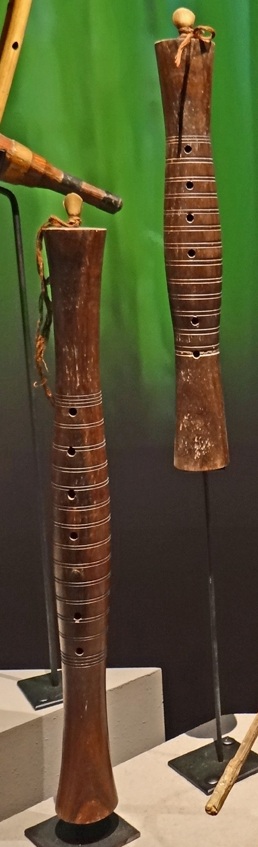
Cambodian sralai instruments. At left the srali thom (thom means big). At right the srali touch or toch (touch means small).

A quadruple reed is a type of reed by means of which the sound is originated in various wind instruments. The term "quadruple reed" comes from the fact that there are four pieces of dried palm leaf vibrating against each other, in pairs. A quadruple reed, such as the Thai pinai, operates in a similar way as the double reed and produces a timbre similar to the oboe. The Thai pii chawaa is "sometimes described as having a double reed, though this is actually folded yet again, creating four layers of reed and thus requiring considerable lung power to play".

Presumably a quadruple reed is folded twice, in opposite directions, instead of once (\/\ or \/\/ instead of \/ shaped), or either folded twice in the same direction or wrapped around (◎ instead of ○ shaped). Both options could result in what may be considered a reed of quadruple thickness. A reed may be folded into the center at 1/4 and 3/4 the length, and then this may be folded in half, with the center being outwards and the four sides being enclosed, making a single reed of quadruple thickness.

== Instruments which use quadruple reeds ==
- Hne (Myanmar)
- Pi (Thailand)
- Pui' Pui' (Makassar, Indonesia)
- Sawnay (Mindanao, Philippines)
- Sarunay (Sulu archipelago, Philippines)
- Serunai (Malaysia)
- Shehnai (India)
  - Shawm (Asia) "Each side of the [Thai and Cambonian] shawm's double reed is made from two layers of a smoked palm-leaf, making it in fact a quadruple reed. (Nepalese, Burmese, and Malaysian shawms have similar quadruple reeds.)"
- Sralai (Cambodia)
- Sri Lankan oboe
- Serune Kalee (Aceh, Indonesia)
