= Pey pok =

Cambodian musical instrument

The pei pok (Khmer: ប៉ីពក) is a Cambodian bamboo free-reed pipe. It is similar to the Lanna pi chum of Northern Thailand.

The pey pok is commonly played along with the pey au in krom phleng arak ritual ensembles.
