= Nisa helmeted warrior =

2nd-1st century BCE artifact in Turkmenistan

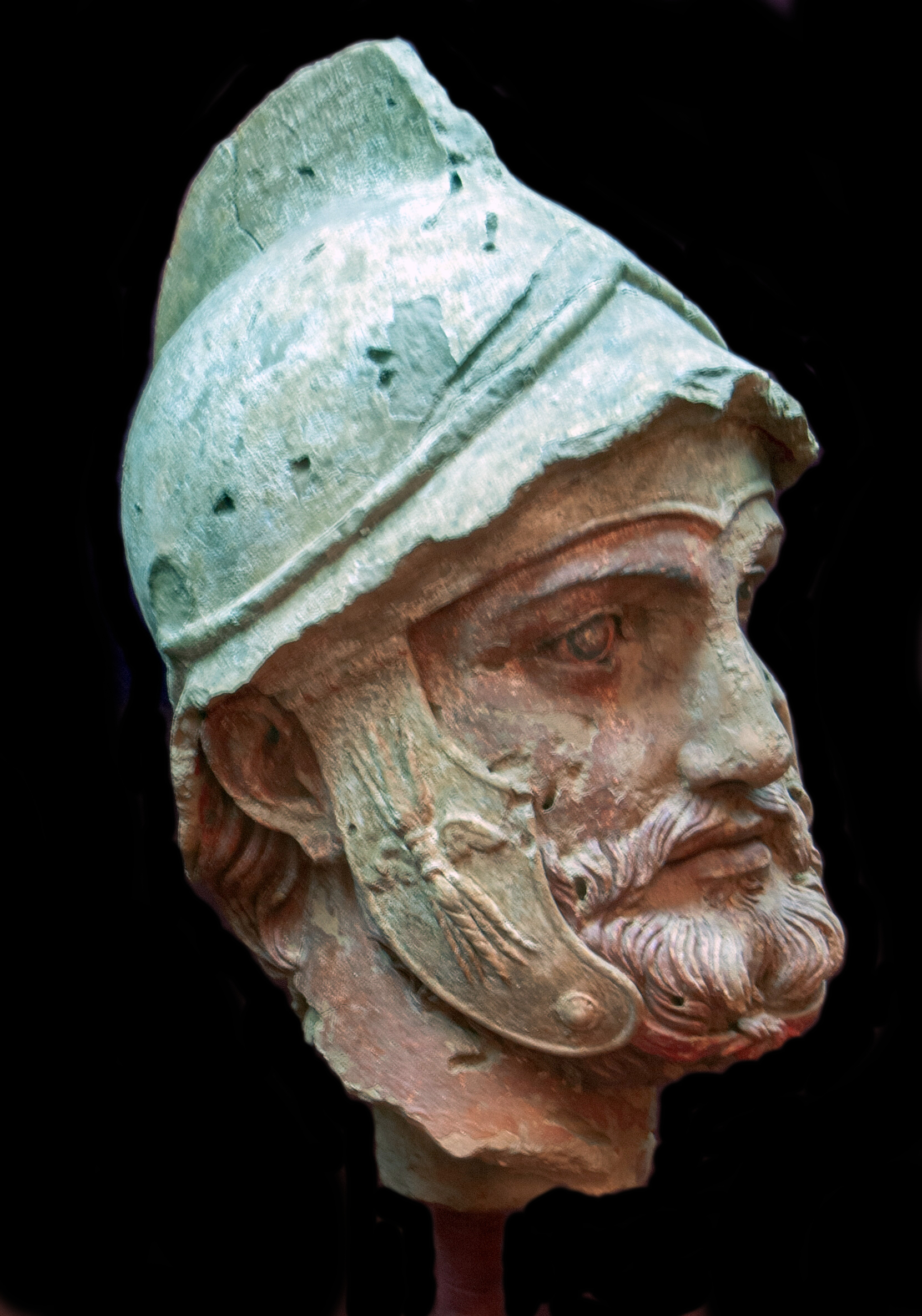
- Sculptured head of a warrior, Old Nisa, 2nd century BCE. National Museum of Turkmenistan
- Material: Molded clay and paint
- Size: 34 cm
- Created: 2nd-1st century BCE
- Discovered: Nisa, Turkmenistan
- Present location: National Museum of Turkmenistan

Location

The Nisa helmeted warrior was found in 1984 during excavations of the Building with a Square Hall at the Old Nisa settlement. It is the head portion of a large clay statue, dated to the end of the 2nd century BCE–1st century BCE.

== Discovery ==
The "Building with a Square Hall" was part of the central complex of Old Nisa. It was an independent structure, but, like other buildings in the complex, its façade opened onto a large northwestern courtyard. The main volume of the building was occupied by a large square hall with an area of about 400 square meters. In addition to the hall, the building had five auxiliary rooms. Huge statues (about 2.3-2.5 m. high) in Greek or sometimes Scythian costume used to be standing in niches high up above the ground in the square hall and were transferred to a small adjoining room during the late Parthian period.

These statues were broken, and only fragments have been discovered within fillings inside the room. The fragments seem to have belonged to five or six clay statues: one of them is female, the rest are male. The head of the "Nisa helmeted warrior" was found in the middle of the room, under a layer of loose loess 25 cm thick. The head was almost whole, with damage to the left side only (ear, brim and cheek piece of the helmet). The head had a layer of paint, which has peeled off in some places. The head belonged to a statue that was approximately one and a half times taller than a human. The height of the head from the crown to the chin is 34 cm. According to the standard proportions typical of Greek art, the full height of the statue must have been around 238 cm.

== Construction ==
The head has a large internal cavity, and was modelled. It was probably made from a plaster mold. During its manufacture, the mold was initially filled from the inside with a thin layer (0.5-2.5 cm) of gray-brown finely ground clay, then a coating of greenish-gray clay was successively applied in ring strips, serving as a kind of frame. The total thickness of the walls of the head reaches 2.5-6 cm. Molding, apparently, was carried out through the neck opening. The head was then covered with gypsum primer and painted.

In the parietal part of the head, at the first stage of molding, an opening was left, which was probably intended for better adhesion to the head of the helmet crest, glued on after removing the head from the mold. Then it was subjected to the necessary corrections, covered with gypsum primer and painted.

== Description ==
The sculpture represents a bearded man of mature age, with regular facial features. The thin nose continues the line of the straight forehead. The relief-modeled eyes have carefully worked out eyelids, convex eyeballs, the borders of the iris and pupil. The eyebrows are thin and arched. The moustache frames the mouth and merges with a short, rounded, slightly wavy beard. The hair is depicted as large, smoothly curved strands.

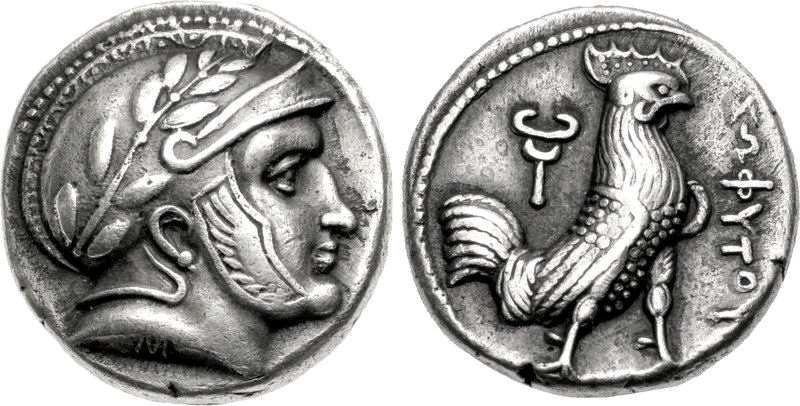
Coin of Sophytes: Obv: Sophytes in profile with tight helmet and wreath. Rev: Cock standing to right, with caduceus, and legend in Greek: ΣΩΦΥΤΟΥ "of Sophytes". Circa 300 BCE

The head is covered by a hemispherical helmet, strongly flattened from the sides. It is equipped with slanted downward brim. Their edges are strongly broken off, making it difficult to determine the exact shape. A massive longitudinal ridge runs along the top of the helmet, with a height at the top reaching 5 cm. Figured cheekpieces are attached to this rim on the sides of the head with loops, colored in red paint. The cheekpieces are long, descending almost to the bottom of the chin. The back edge has an arched outline, in the middle of the front there is a pointed protrusion. The front plane of each cheekpiece is occupied by a large relief image of the emblem of Zeus: a bunch of lightning bolts, equipped with a pair of spread wings.

The face and hair of the statue are painted in a rich red-brown color, the iris of the eyes is brown, the pupil is black, on it a highlight is given with white paint, giving the look a natural liveliness. The outer surface of the helmet is painted white, which possibly indicates that it is made of iron. The chin straps are painted bright red. The back side of the helmet brim has the same color.

The head was made by an experienced sculptor, with great realism and attention to detail, and the helmet as a good copy of known combat headgear of the Hellenistic period. Similar helmets are typical of the end of the 4th century BCE, and can be seem on the coins of Seleucus or Sophytes.

== Style ==
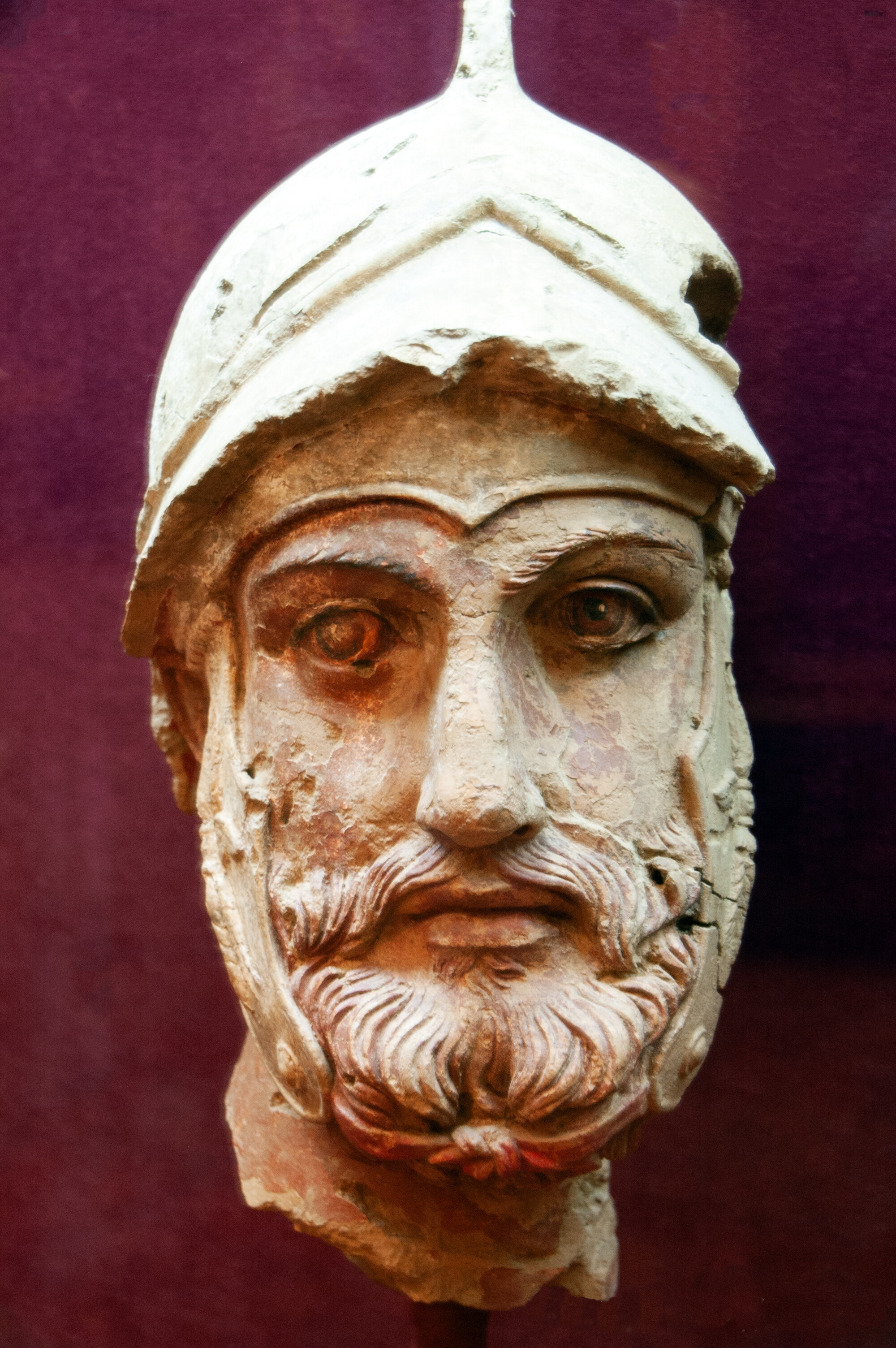
Front view of the terracotta head

This type of sculpture is known from other archaeological sites of Central Asia, such as the facial "masks" of Ai-Khanoum and Takht-i Sangin, and reveals a significant similarity with the stone sculpture of the Hellenistic period, both in the general stylistic direction, the desire to create a living realistic image, and in individual techniques (the modeling of the eyes, the manner of depicting the hair). It follows the canons of Greek art. It is thought that it initially developed with the direct participation of Greek masters, and largely followed the canons of Greek art. Before the Greeks, during the Achaemenid period, round sculpture had been poorly developed, even in the leading cultural centers of the empire such as Persopolis, Pasargadae and Susa, and for Central Asia it is generally unknown.

Still, to some extent, the features that became fundamental in the "Parthian art" of the first centuries CE, such as frontality, staticity and emotional detachment, can also be perceived in the sculpture.

== Physical appearance and interpretation ==
The physical appearance of the warrior reveals striking "Greek" features, such as the line of the forehead, nose and chin, all located almost in the same plane. The external appearance is characteristic of the Greeks. The style of the sculpture and its "Olympian" calm, may indicate that a Greek deity is intended.

An anthropological comparison of the facial features with those from the portraits of Parthian kings (Mithridates I and Mithridates II, Artabanus I and Phraates II), showed that there are significant differences in their physical appearance. In addition, the absence of Parthian symbols of royal power such as a diadem suggest this is not the image of a Parthian king.

Only the head was found, and it has not been connected to specific fragment of the torso. Among the other fragments from the room, were discovered fragments of torsos in armor, and female torsos draped in the Greek manner. But fragments of arms with narrow, tight sleeves and transverse folds were also found, which are typical of the Iranian costume. Thus, it must be assumed that the Building with the Square Hall housed statues in both Greek and Iranian attire. It is unknown whether these were images of gods and heroes, or whether the statues represented members of the ruling dynasty.

The statues may also have been intended to represent Seleucid princes, as enemies or relatives of the Arsacids.

Remains of another helmeted head were also found, with the design of an anguipede fighting figure on the helmet flaps, all in purely Hellenistic style, suggesting the representation of a divine figure, rather than any Parthian individual.

== Other Central Asia terracotta heads ==
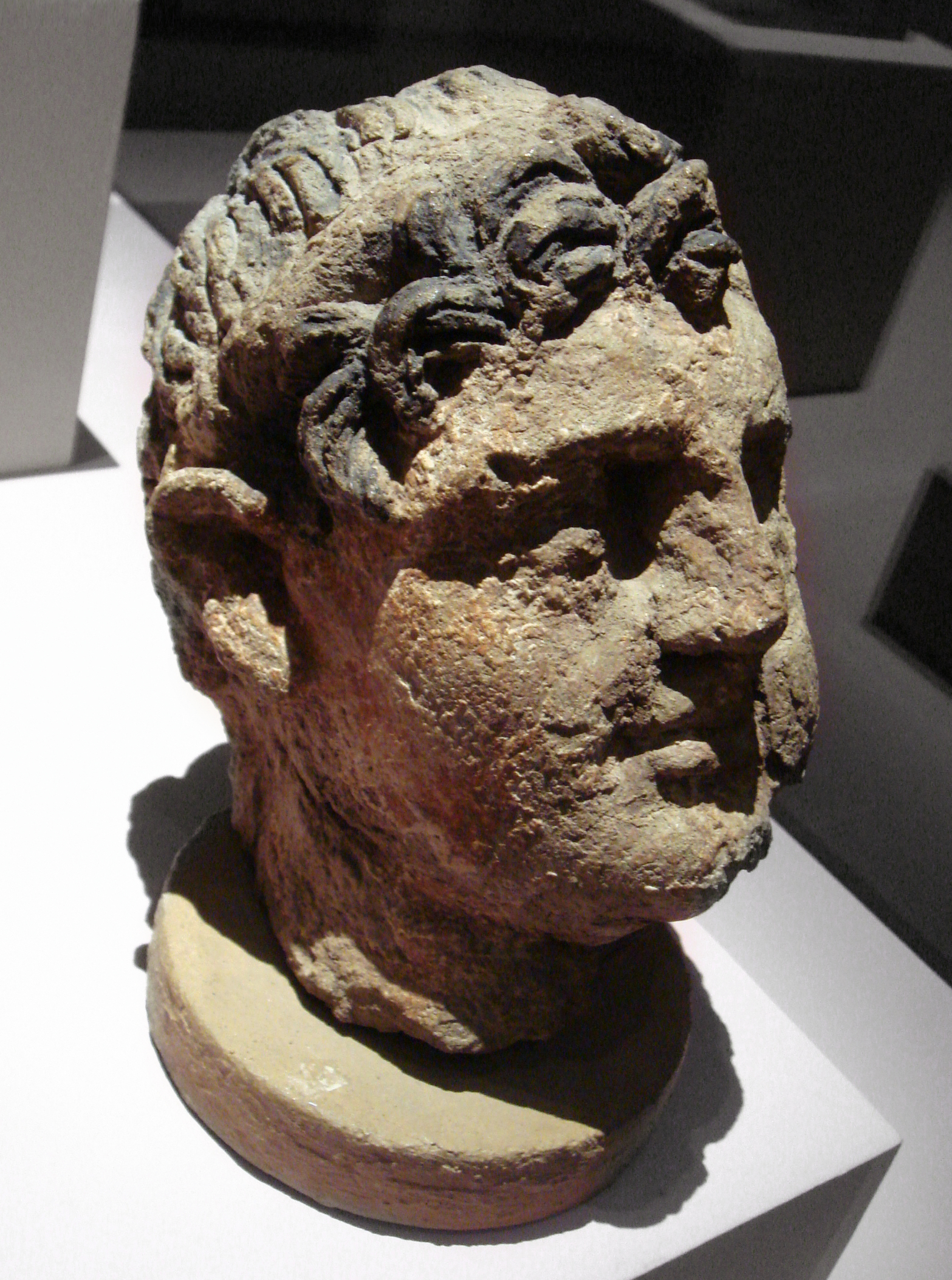
Head of a Greco-Bactrian ruler with diadem, Temple of the Oxus, Takht-i Sangin, 3rd-2nd century BC. This could also be a portrait of Seleucus I.

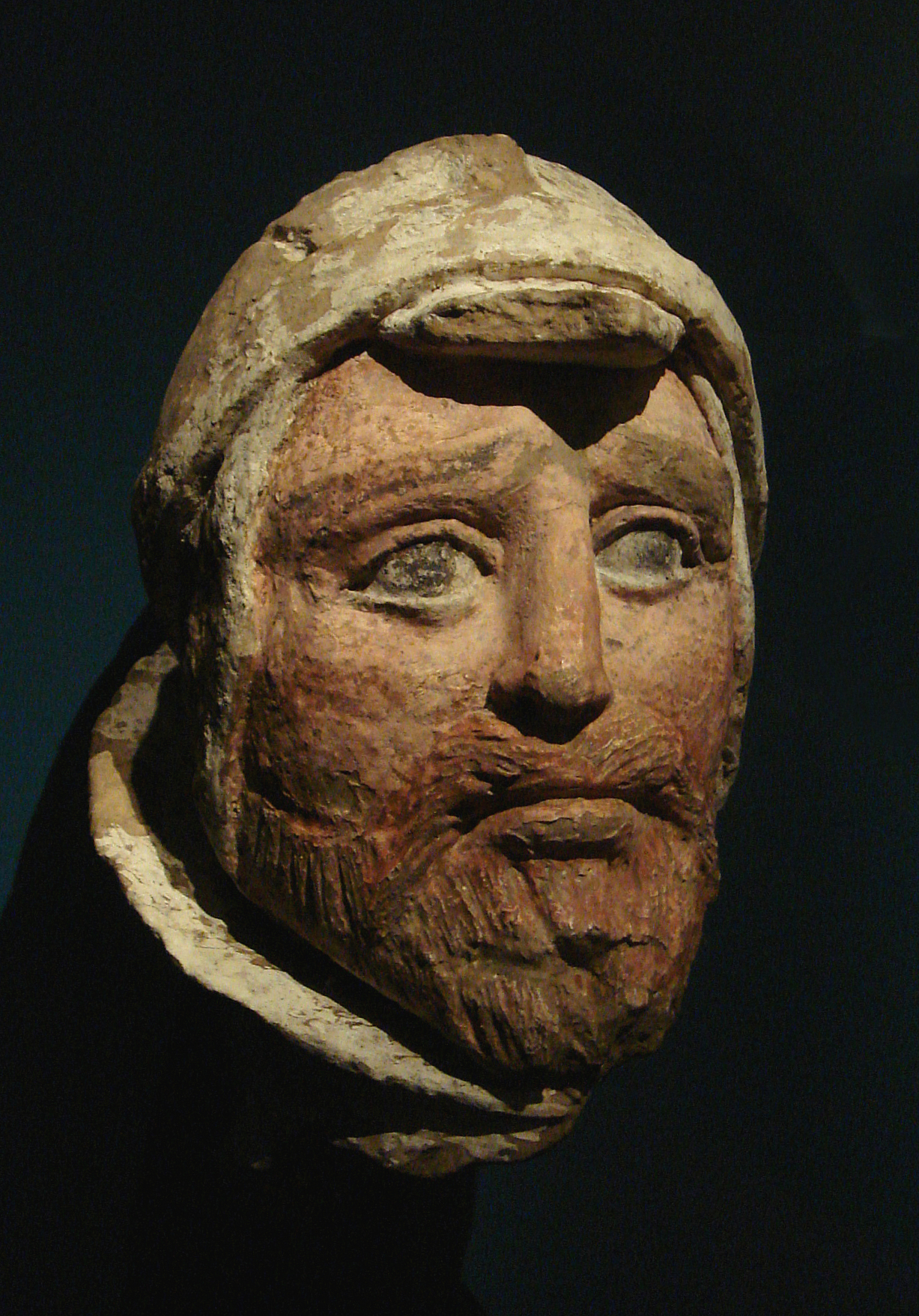
A Saka warrior, as a defeated enemy of the Yuezhi, Khalchayan. 1st century BCE

== Other readings ==
- BRILL "Archaeological Studies in Turkmenistan"
