= Elena Abramovna Davidovich =

Russian historian and archeologist specialist of coins

Elena Davidovich
- Елена Абрамовна Давидович
- Born: 24 December 1922; Krasnoyarsk
- Died: 5 December 2013 (aged 90)
- Citizenship: Russian
- Occupations: Numismatist; archaeologist
- Spouse: Boris Anatolyevich Litvinsky

Academic background
- Education: Central Asian University
- Thesis: On Money Circulation in the State of Shaybanids (1965)

Elena Abramovna Davidovich (Russian: Елена Абрамовна Давидович; 24 December 1922 - 5 December 2013) was a Russian archaeologist and numismatist, who specialised in the coinages of Central Asia. A founder of the discipline of archaeology in Tajikistan, Davidovich also argued that numismatics was a discipline equal to archaeology as a historical science.

== Early life and education ==
Davidovich was born on 24 December 1922 in Krasnoyarsk. Her family moved to Tashkent and Davidovich attended middle school there. During the Second World War she studied history at the Central Asian University in Tashkent. At the same time she worked as a nurse in the hospital there.

== Career ==
After completing her studies in 1945, Davidovich stayed at the university, specialized in archaeology and taught with Mikhail Masson. During the 1948 excavation campaign in Nisa, she discovered a hoard of Parthian rhyta, whilst she was responsible for excavations at the 'Square House' there. She married her fellow student Boris Anatolyevich Litvinsky. When the orientalist Alexander Semenov founded the Ahmad Donisch Institute for History and Archaeology in Dushanbe in the late 1940s, he hired Davidovich and Litvinsky as research assistants. Davidovich was awarded her doctorate in history in 1965. Her thesis was entitled 'On Money Circulation in the State of Shaybanids'. In 1969 she was appointed professor.

In the early 1970s Davidovich and Litvinsky moved to Moscow to the Institute for History, Russian Academy of Sciences at the invitation of its director Bobodschon Ghafurow. Davidovich and her husband collaborated on a number of research projects, including the South Tajikistan Archaeological Research Expedition. From 1973 she was appointed Head of the Department of Sources at the Institute of Oriental Studies; a post she held until 1988. A prolific writer, she published nine monographs and over three hundred articles. Davidovich was also an exponent of the idea that numismatics was a discipline of historical science equal to archaeology.

She died on 5 December 2013, after a long period of illness.

== Historiography ==
Davidovich was an expert in Islamic numismatics. She and her husband were recognised as the founders of the discipline of archaeology in Tajikistan. She was a notable numismatist whose research focus was the coinage of Central Asia and the Middle East. She was remarkable in the range of her research interests - from the eighth to the eighteenth centuries in particular - as well as her detailed approach to the subject, using her skills in mathematics, metrology and epigraphy to aid her numismatic research. In 1972 she published a major work, which revolutionised the understanding of production and circulation of coinage in thirteenth-century Central Asia. In Denezhoe khozi︠a︡ĭstvo Sredneĕ Azii posie mongol'skogo zavoenvnii︠a︡ i reforma Mas'ud-beka she argued that the changes to mid-thirteenth century currency were innovated by Mas'ud Bek, who was the son of an administrator for Chingis Khan. She also differentiated between coinage for different purposes, both local and across the empire. In her study of the copper coinage of Hisar, she linked its debasement to the politics of Khusrau Shah.

== Select bibliography ==
- Denezhoe khozi︠a︡ĭstvo Sredneĕ Azii posie mongol'skogo zavoenvnii︠a︡ i reforma Mas'ud-beka
- Serebri︠a︡nye monety Mukhammad-Sheĭbani-Khana, 907-916
- Klady drevnikh i srednevekovykh monet Tadzhikistana
- Davidovich, Elena A. "The Karakhanids." History of civilizations of Central Asia (1998)
