= Warada (hunting tool) =

Ancient Japanese hunting tool

A warada (ワラダ) was a traditional Japanese hunting tool. It was used as an aid when rabbit hunting in the snow.

The name "warada" is a corruption of waradaka (藁鷹; lit. 'straw hawk'). Although warada are mainly associated with the matagi hunters of northern Japan, their use is documented as far south as the old Hida Province, where they were known as hyūtan (ヒュウタン).

== Summary ==
A warada is a flat ring of plaited straw with a diameter of roughly 30 cm (12 in). A wooden handle passes through the ring lengthwise and protrudes several centimetres from the outer edge. In some versions, the edge of the ring was lined with angled hawk feathers. Using the handle for leverage, a warada was thrown like a frisbee. In flight the spinning disc acted as an aerophone, producing a rhythmic humming sound very similar to the wingbeats predatory birds like the Eurasian goshawk or black kite. This sound, combined with the swiftly-moving shadow of the flying warada, frightened rabbits and invariably caused them to burrow into the snow to hide. The warada hunter, having been watching from a distance, could then walk to the hole and pull the rabbit out with his bare hand before it had time to dig into the ground beneath.

The matagi, who lived in the forest alongside animals for centuries, had a deep understanding of ethology and were able to use this knowledge to develop advanced hunting techniques.

== See also ==
- Bullroarer
