= Sralai =

Cambodian musical instrument

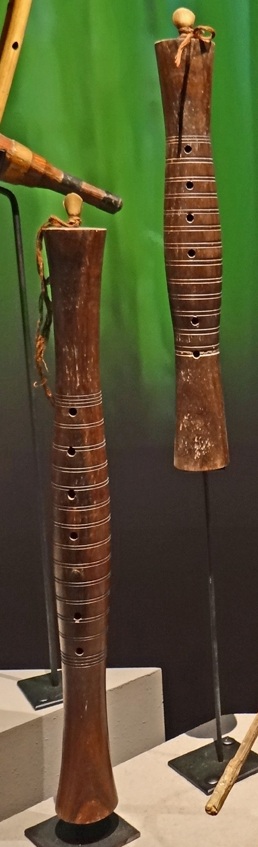
Two sralai instruments. At left the srali thom (thom means big). At right the srali touch or toch (touch means small).

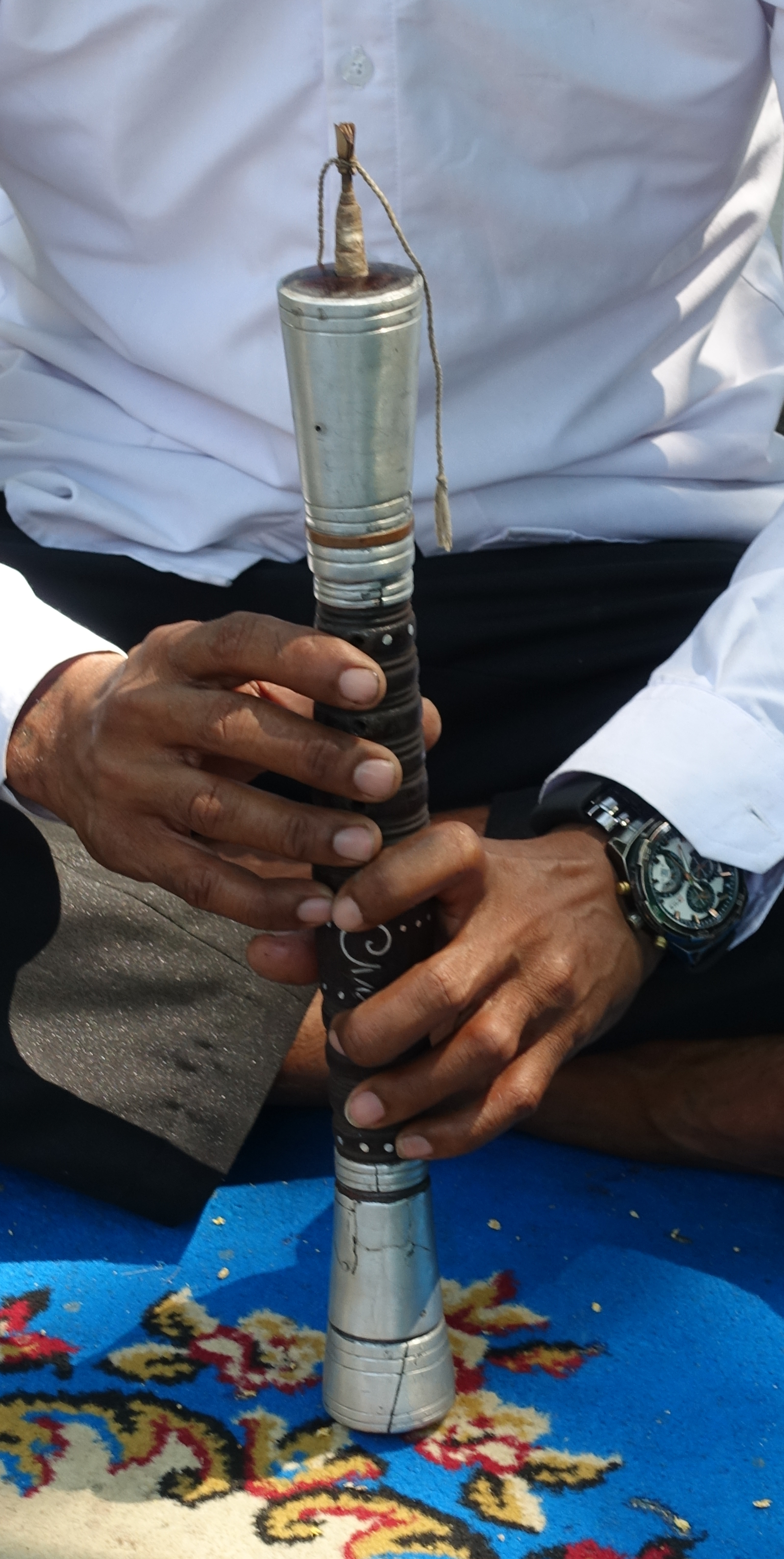
Sralai player showing his instrument, Siem Reap, 2024

The sralai (Khmer: ស្រឡៃ) is a Cambodian wind instrument that uses a quadruple reed to produce sound. The instrument is used in the pinpeat orchestra, where it is the only wind instrument. The set of quadruple reeds are made of palm leaf. The bore of the instrument is not evenly bored, but "slightly conical." Its cousin, the Western oboe, has a double reed and a conical bore. The pinpeat instruments tune to the sralai's pitch, and the player must learn circular breathing to play continuously without stopping for breath. The sralai is very similar in construction and playing technique to the Thai pi.

== See also ==
- Shehnai quadruple-reed instrument used throughout the Indian subcontinent
