= Kèn bầu =

Musical instrument

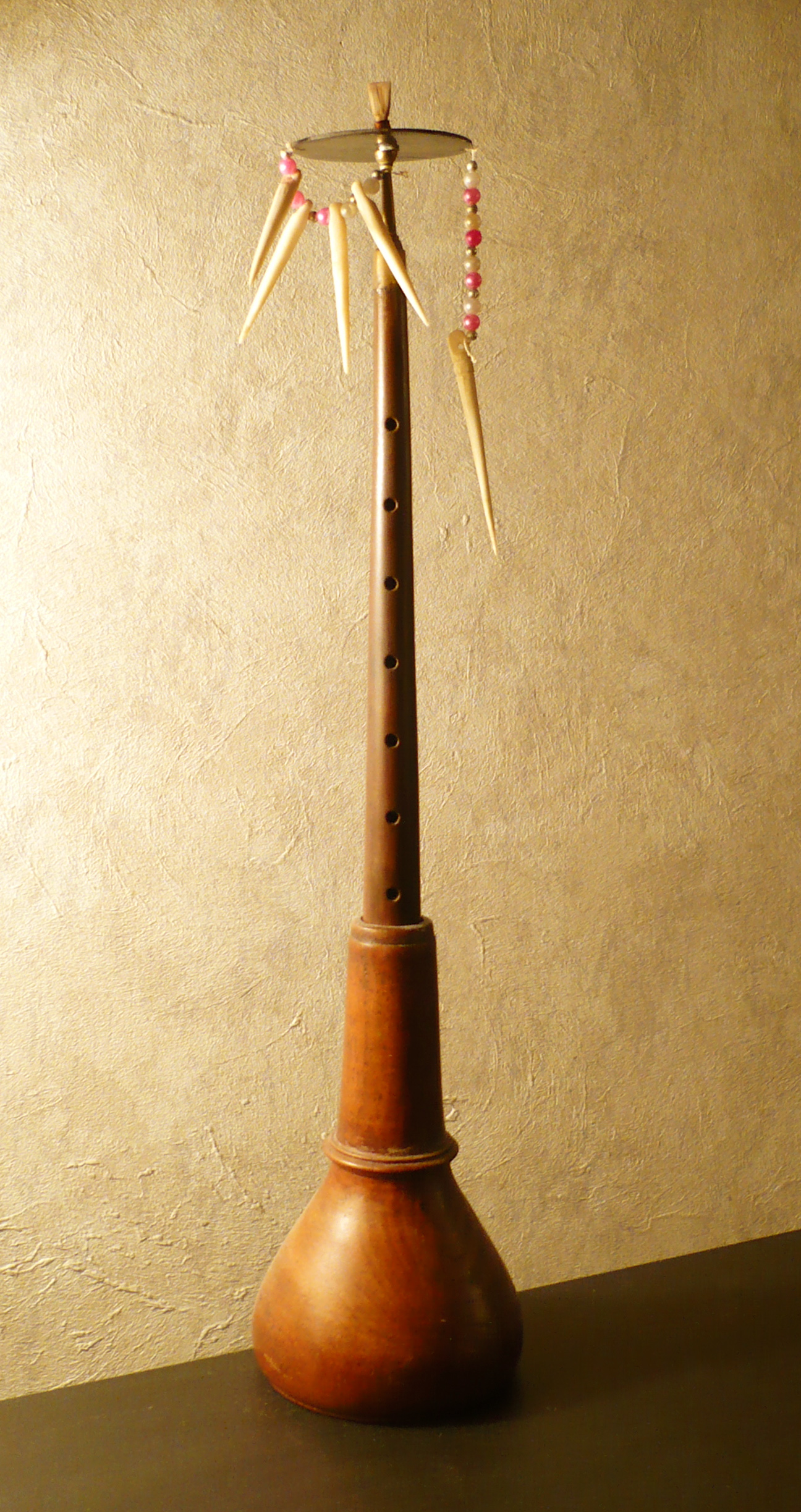
A kèn bầu

The kèn bầu (Vietnamese: [kɛ̂n ɓə̂w]) is one of several types of kèn, a double reed wind instrument used in the traditional music of Vietnam. It is similar in construction and sound to the Chinese suona and the Korean taepyeongso. It comes in various sizes and is a primary instrument of the former royal court music of Huế.

== Construction ==
The instrument has a conical hardwood body with seven finger holes. Unlike its Chinese and Korean counterparts, the kèn bầu has a detachable bell made of jackfruit wood, carved in the shape of a gourd (originally it was probably made out of an actual dried gourd, but wood is more durable). Into the playing end is fitted a small brass tube onto which a small double reed is placed. This type of musical instrument are quite familiar in Asia, the Indian analogy being Shehnai.

== Playing ==
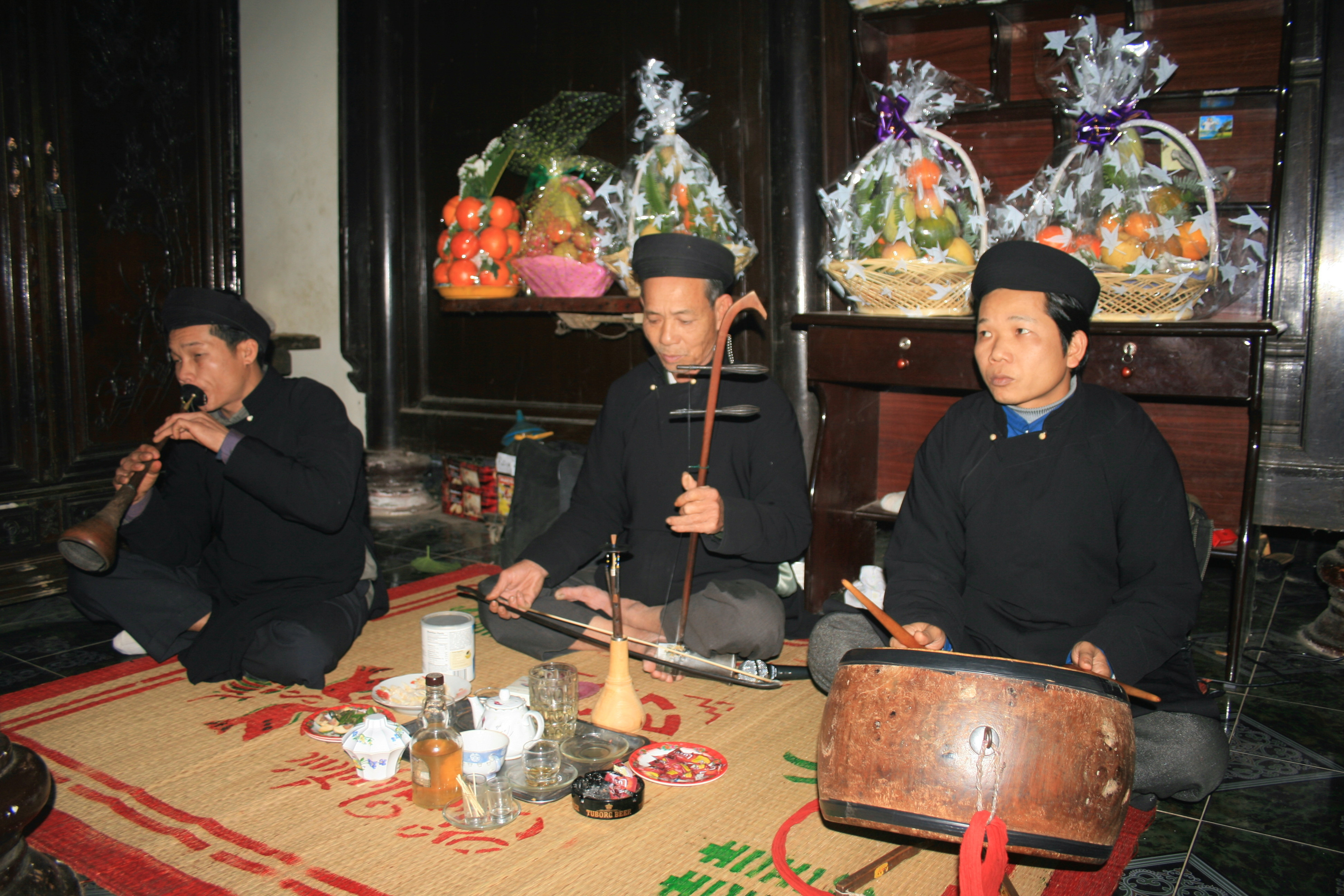
Kèn bầu (far left) in a Vietnamese traditional funeral

The instrument's technique involves the use of circular breathing as well as a wide variety of ornamentation including wide vibrato and sliding tones.

== Etymology ==
Kèn means oboe and bầu means gourd, referring to the instrument's bell. The Vietnamese monochord zither called đàn bầu, which also formerly had a gourd as part of its construction, shares the use of this word in its name.

== Performers ==
One of the most prominent kèn bầu players is Trần Thảo, who leads the nhã nhạc (royal music) group of Hue and has toured internationally. He is part of a hereditary lineage of court musicians.
