= Rhoptron =

Type of ancient Parthian drum

- Classification: Percussion instrument
- Developed: Ancient Greece

Related instruments
- Tambourine

Musicians
- Corybantes

A rhoptron ((Greek: ρόπτρον), plural: rhoptra) was a buzzing drum used in Parthian music. According to Plutarch, the Parthian Empire used it made a frightening sound—resembling a mix of animal noises and lightning—to scare their opponents in battle, instead of the more typical Greek battlefield instruments like the salpinx.

According to Plutarch, a rhoptron was made from hollowed-out piece of pine or fir that had only one opening (stoma), unlike a frame drum, which were also used by the Greeks. This piece was somehow fitted with bronze bells (kōdōnes) and covered with oxhide, so that the bells collided with the head as it was played. In this way it resembles a snare drum more than a tambourine, though the latter is often used in translation. The rhoptra were played with the fingers, not sticks.

It was associated with the Corybantes in Ancient Greece.

Rhoptra were also known as rhombos, which also designated a bullroarer. Among the Ancient Greeks it also meant a door knocker, a meaning it retains in the modern language.

== See also ==
- Parthian music
