= Bullroarer =

Musical instrument

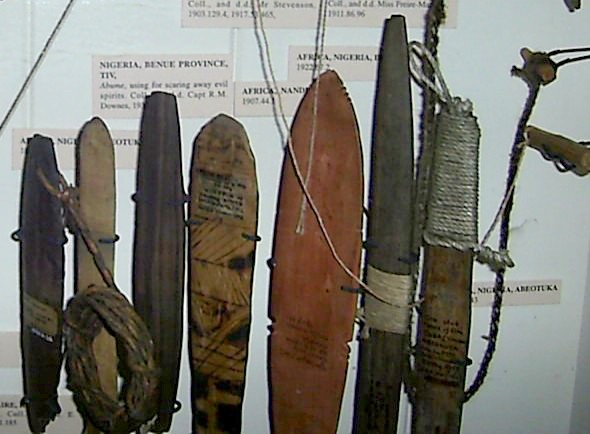
Bullroarers from Africa in the Pitt Rivers Museum

The bullroarer, rhombus, or turndun is an ancient ritual musical instrument and a device historically used for communicating over great distances. It consists of a piece of wood attached to a string, which when swung in a large circle produces a roaring vibration sound.

It dates to the Paleolithic period, examples dating from 18,000 BC having been found in Ukraine. Anthropologist Michael Boyd, a bullroarer expert, documents a number found in Europe, Asia, Africa, the Americas, and Australia. In Ancient Greece, it was a sacred instrument used in the Dionysian Mysteries and is still used in rituals worldwide. It was a prominent musical technology among the Australian Aboriginal people, used in ceremonies and to communicate with different people groups across the continent.

Many different cultures believe that the sounds they make have the power to ward off evil influences.

== Design and operation ==
Video of a bullroarer being swung to make a noise

A bullroarer consists of a weighted airfoil (a rectangular thin slat of wood about 15 to 60 centimetres (6 to 20 in) long and about 1.2 to 5 centimetres (0.5 to 2 in) wide) attached to a long cord. Typically, the wood slat is trimmed down to a sharp edge and serrations along the length of the wooden slat may or may not be used, depending on the cultural traditions of the region in question.

The cord is given a slight initial twist, and the roarer is then swung in a large circle in a horizontal plane, or in a smaller circle in a vertical plane. The aerodynamics of the roarer thrown in this centrifugal force will keep it spinning about its axis even after the initial twist has unwound. The cord winds fully first in one direction and then the other, alternating.

It makes a characteristic roaring vibrato sound with notable sound modulations occurring from the rotation of the roarer along its longitudinal axis, and the choice of whether a shorter or longer length of cord is used to spin the bullroarer. By modifying the expansiveness of its circuit and the speed given it, and by changing the plane in which the bullroarer is whirled from horizontal to vertical or vice versa, the modulation of the sound produced can be controlled, making the coding of information possible.

The low-frequency component of the sound travels extremely long distances, clearly audible over many miles on a quiet night.

== In culture ==
Various cultures have used bullroarers as musical, ritual, and religious instruments and long-range communication devices for at least 19,000 years.

North American Indigenous Bullroarers.
Navajo tsin ndi'ni' "groaning stick"	Apache tzi-ditindi "sounding wood"	Gros Ventre nakaa^{n}ta^{n} "making cold"

This instrument has been used by numerous early and traditional cultures in both the Northern Hemisphere and Southern Hemisphere, but in the popular consciousness it is perhaps best known for its use by Aboriginal Australians (it is from one of their languages that the name turndun comes).

Henry Cowell composed a composition for two violins, viola, two celli, and two bullroarers. A bullroarer featured in the Kate Bush Before The Dawn concerts in London 2014.

=== Australian Aboriginal culture ===
Bullroarers have been used in initiation ceremonies and in burials to ward off evil spirits, and for bad tidings. Bullroarers are considered secret men's business by all or almost all Aboriginal tribal groups, and hence forbidden for women, children, non-initiated men, or outsiders to even hear. Fison and Howitt documented this in "Kamilaroi and Kurnai" (page 198). Anyone caught breaching the imposed secrecy was to be punished by death.

They are used in men's initiation ceremonies, and the sound they produce is considered in some indigenous cultures to represent the sound of the Rainbow Serpent. In the cultures of southeastern Australia, the sound of the bullroarer is the voice of Daramulan, and a successful bullroarer can be made only if it has been cut from a tree containing its spirit.

The bullroarer can also be used as a tool in Aboriginal art.

Bullroarers have sometimes been referred to as "wife-callers" by Indigenous Australians.

A bullroarer is used by Paul Hogan in the 1988 film Crocodile Dundee II. John Antill included one in the orchestration of his ballet Corroboree (1946). See: Corroboree.

An Australian band Midnight Oil included a recording of an imitation bullroarer on their album Diesel and Dust (1987) at the beginning of the song "Bullroarer". In an interview, the band's drummer Rob Hirst stated "it's a sacred instrument... only initiated men are supposed to hear those sounds. So we didn't use a real bullroarer as that would have been cultural imperialism. Instead we used an imitation bullroarer that school kids in Australia use. It is a ruler with a piece of rope wrapped around it."

=== Ancient Greece ===
In Ancient Greece, bullroarers were especially used in the ceremonies of the cult of Cybele. A bullroarer was known as a rhombos (literally meaning "whirling" or "rumbling"), both to describe its sonic character and its typical shape, the rhombus. (Rhombos also sometimes referred to the rhoptron, a buzzing drum).

=== Great Britain and Ireland ===
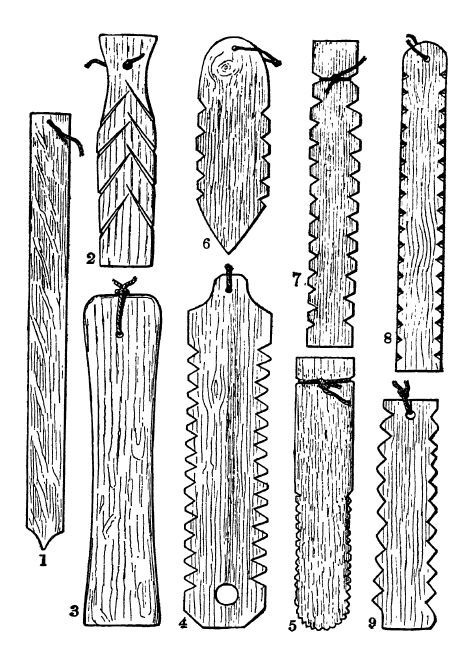
Bullroarers from Great Britain and Ireland

In Great Britain and Ireland, the bullroarer—under a number of different names and styles—is used chiefly for amusement, although formerly it may have been used for ceremonial purposes. In parts of Scotland it was known as a "thunder-spell" and was thought to protect against being struck by lightning. In the Elizabeth Goudge novel Gentian Hill (1949), set in Devon in the early 19th century, a bullroarer figures as a toy cherished by Sol, an elderly farm labourer, who uses it occasionally to express strong emotion; however, the sound it makes is perceived as being both eerie and unlucky by two other characters, who have an uneasy sense that ominous spirits of the air ("Them") are being invoked by its whirring whistle.

=== Scandinavia ===
Scandinavian Stone Age cultures used the bullroarer. In 1991, the archeologists Hein B. Bjerck and Martinius Hauglid found a 6.4 cm-long piece of slate that turned out to be a 5000-year-old bullroarer (called a brummer in Scandinavia). It was found in Tuv in northern Norway, a place that was inhabited in the Stone Age.

=== Mali ===
The Dogon use bullroarers to announce the beginning of ceremonies conducted during the Sigui festival held every sixty years over a seven-year period. The sound has been identified as the voice of an ancestor from whom all Dogon are descended.

=== Polynesia ===
Native Hawaiians have oeoe of two sizes: a large one made of coconut shell producing a deep thrum, and a smaller one made of the kamani nut producing a high shrill.

The pūrerehua is a traditional Māori bullroarer made from wood, stone or bone and attached to a long string supposed to imitate the sound of a moth, hence its name. The instruments were traditionally used for healing or making rain.

=== Native North American ===
Almost all the native tribes in North America used bullroarers in religious and healing ceremonies and as toys. There are many styles.

North Alaskan Iñupiat bullroarers are known as imigluktaaq or imigluktaun and described as toy noise maker of bone or wood and braided sinew (wolf-scare).

Banks Island Inuvialuit were still using Bullroarers in 1963, when a 59 year old woman named Susie scared off four polar bears armed only with three seal hooks acting as such accompanied by vocals. Aleut, Iñupiat, and Inuit used bullroarers occasionally as a children's toy or musical instruments, but preferred drums and rattles.

==== Pomo ====
The inland Pomo tribes of California used bullroarers as a central part of the xalimatoto or Thunder ceremony. Four male tribe members, accompanied by a drummer, would spin bullroarers made from cottonwood, imitating the sound of a thunder storm.

=== Native South American ===
Shamans of the Amazon basin, for example in Tupi, Kamayurá and Bororo culture used bullroarers as musical instrument for rituals. In Tupian languages, the bullroarer is known as hori hori.

== See also ==
- Buzzer (whirligig)
- Warada (aerophone)
