= Pey au =

Cambodian musical instrument

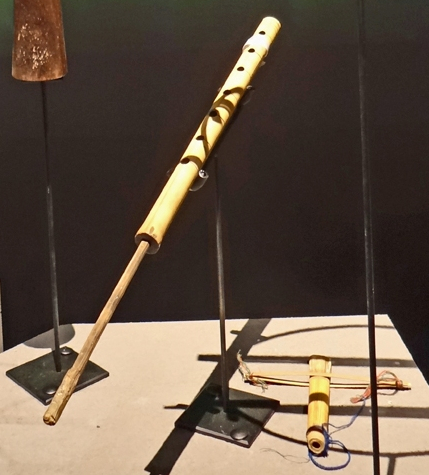
Cambodian musical instrument called a pey au. The instrument uses a bundle of reed and ratan called a loam (lower right) which forms a cartridge that inserts into the end of the flute-half. The flute-half is on the left.

The pey au (sometimes spelled pei au or pei ar) (Khmer: ប៉ីអ) is a Cambodian double reed pipe with a cylindrical bore.

The instrument uses an external reed, cut from a prebos tree and flattened with small strips of ratan. The bundle is inserted into a hold at the top of the flute part of the instrument, creating a mouthpiece. The instrument's body is made of "narrow bore bamboo", narrower than that used for the khloy vertical flute and pey pok. The instrument gives the pitch to be used in aareak and phleng kar wedding orchestras. Pitches are not standardized in Cambodia, although the spaces between pitches is.

The pei au was probably introduced to Cambodia during the time of the Funan kingdom, which existed from the mid-1st century to the mid-7th century, and thus can be considered a relative of the Chinese bili, which was probably borrowed from Central Asia sometime in the Northern and Southern Dynasties period (420-589). As such, it predates the Angkor period (9th—15th centuries AD), and has played with the aareak and aapeapipa orchestras for as long.
