= Achaemenid music =

Aspect of Iranian history

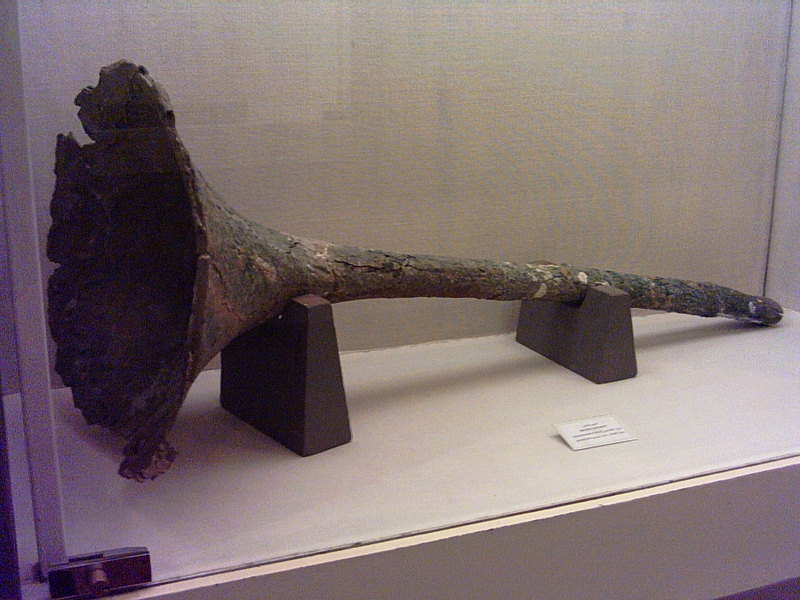
A Karnay metal trumpet, dated to c. 500 BCE Persepolis

Music is attested as having been an integral and prominent societal aspect of the Achaemenid Empire, which existed between 550 and 330 BCE. However, recorded knowledge on the subject is scarce and largely sourced from ancient Greek historians.

== Background ==
The Achaemenid Empire (550–330 BCE) arose from the conquests of Cyrus the Great, whose familial dynasty was named for their mythical progenitor Achaemenes. At its height, it was the largest empire by that point in history, spanning from the Balkans to Egypt and the Indus Valley. A further source of unification arose from the widespread adoption of Zoroastrianism as set forth by the prophet Zoroaster a few centuries earlier. The empire fell to the conquests of Alexander the Great, whose successors formed the Seleucid Empire.

The earliest music in Persia is difficult to pinpoint, due to a paucity of extant records. Persian music has existed since at least c. 3300–3100 BCE of the Elamite period, from when the earliest artistic depictions of arched harps are dated; it is possible that these instruments existed long before their visual depictions. Later surviving instruments include bull lyres from c. 2450, small Oxus trumpets from c. 2200–1750, and much later, lutes from c. 1300 BCE, which seem to have been popular with the upper class. Rock reliefs of Kul-e Farah from 1st century BCE include sophisticated Persian court ensembles, in which the arched harp is central.

== Overview ==
Under the Achaemenids, the influence of Persian culture reached across the state. Like earlier periods, relatively few records of music survive. The Iranian-American ethnomusicologist Hormoz Farhat describes the dire situation: "the Achaemenian dynasty, with all its grandeur and glory, has left us nothing to reveal the nature of its musical culture". Persian traditional music was first developed by at least this period, later flourishing in the golden age of Sasanian music. Most knowledge on the Achaemenid musical culture comes from ancient Greek historians.

In his Histories, Herodotus noted that Achaemenid priests did not use aulos music in their ceremonies, while Xenophon reflected on his visit to Persia in the Cyropaedia, mentioning the presence of many female singers at court. Athenaeus also mentions female singers when noting that 329 of them had been taken from the King of Kings Darius III by Macedonian general Parmenion. (Note: See Athenaeus 1854b, p. 608. Also see Athenaeus 1854a, p. 530 for another singing girls anecdote.) These female musicians may have been a precursor to the Qiyan tradition in the aftermath of the Muslim conquest of Persia.

Later Persian texts assert that gōsān poet-musician minstrels were prominent and of considerable status in court.

The influence of Persian musical culture spread as far as ancient China; the tuning peg from a 2nd-century-BCE guqin-Zither is adorned with Achaemenid imagery.
