= Nisa, Turkmenistan =

Ancient capital of the Parthian Empire

Nisa
- Parthaunisa; Mithradatkirt; Nusaý
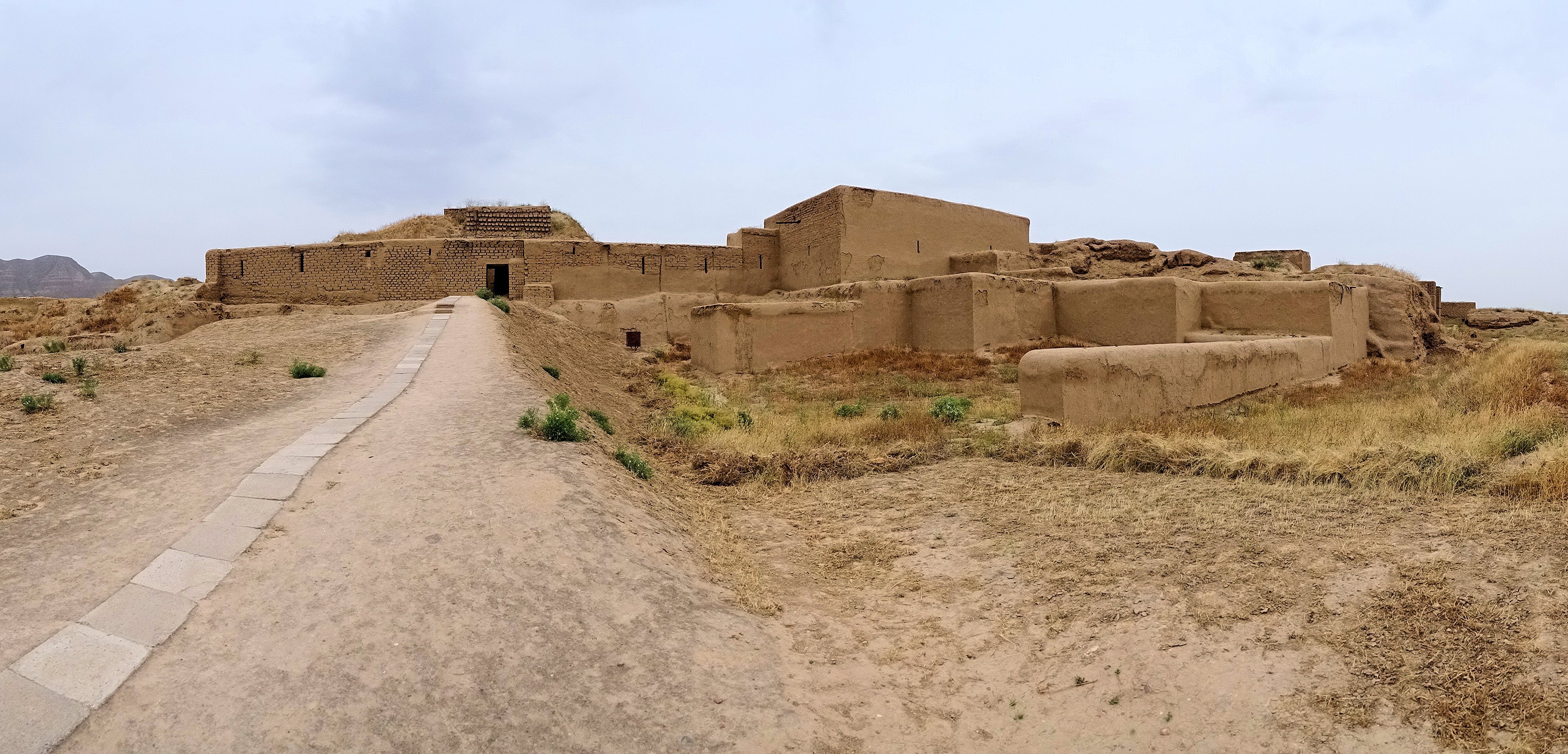
- Entrance to Nisa

- Location within West and Central Asia Location within Turkmenistan
- 37°58′0″N 58°11′42″E
- Type: Settlement
- Periods: Parthian Empire
- Cultures: Parthian
- Associated with: Arsaces I, Mithridates I
- Location: Ashgabat, Turkmenistan

History
- Abandoned: 100 B.C.

Site notes
- Condition: Ruined

UNESCO World Heritage Site
- Official name: Parthian Fortresses of Nisa
- Criteria: Cultural: (ii), (iii)
- Reference: 1242
- Inscription: 2007 (31st Session)
- Area: 77.9 ha (0.301 sq mi)
- Buffer zone: 400.3 ha (1.546 sq mi)

Nisa (Ancient Greek: Νῖσος, Νίσα, Νίσαιον; Turkmen: Nusaý; also Parthaunisa) was an ancient settlement of the Parthians, located near the Bagyr neighborhood of Ashgabat, Turkmenistan, 18 km west of the city center. Nisa is described by some as the first seat of the Arsacid Empire. It is traditionally assumed to have been founded by Arsaces I (reigned c. 250 BC–211 BC) and was reputedly the royal residence of the Parthian kings, although it has not been established that the fortress at Nisa was either a royal residence or a mausoleum.

In 2007, the fortress was declared a World Heritage Site by UNESCO.

== History ==
Nisa was a major trading hub in the Parthian Empire. It was later renamed Mithradātkert (Parthian: 𐭌𐭕𐭓𐭃𐭕𐭊𐭓𐭕, lit. 'fortress of Mithradates') by Mithridates I of Parthia (reigned c. 171 BC–138 BC). The region was famous for the beauty, agility and strength of its horses.

Nisa was totally destroyed by an earthquake during the 1st decade BC.

== Excavations ==
Excavations at Nisa have revealed substantial buildings, mausoleums and shrines, many inscribed documents, and a looted treasury. Many Hellenistic art works have been uncovered, as well as a large number of ivory rhytons, and rims (coins) decorated with Iranian subjects or classical mythological scenes.

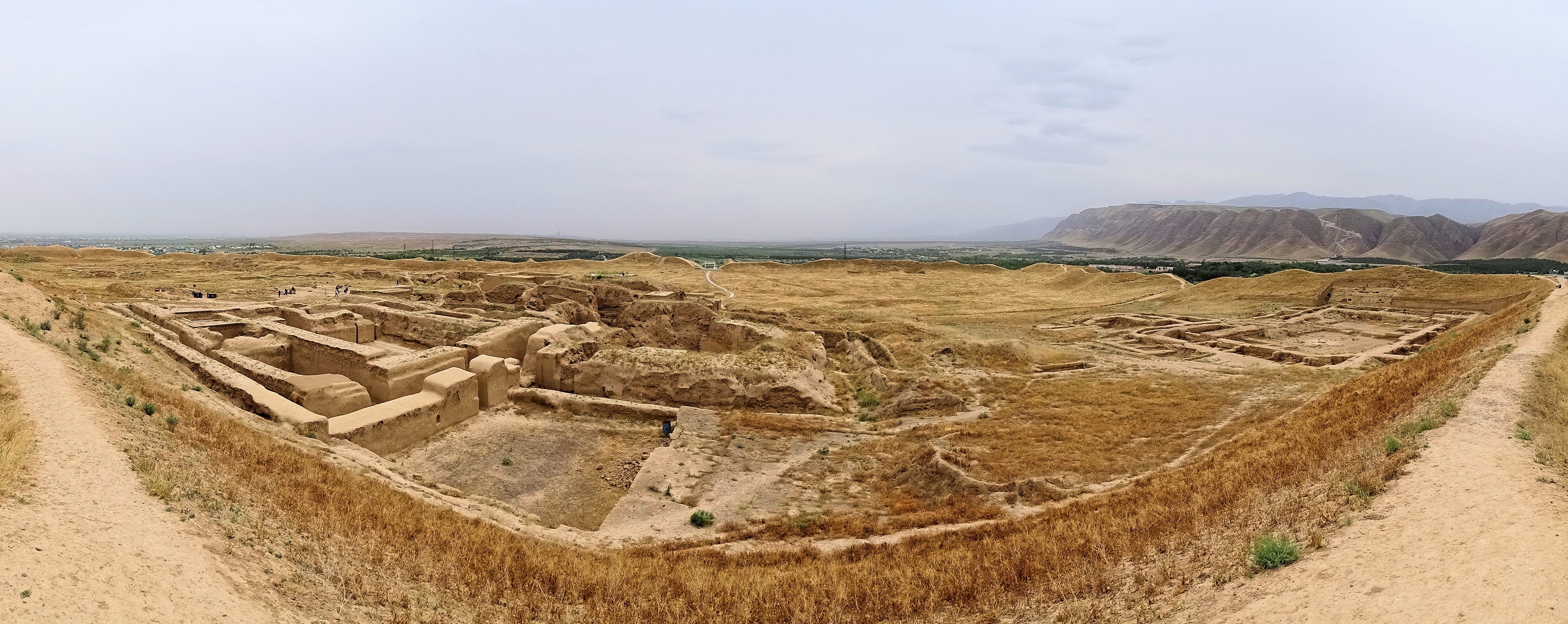
Nisa seen from its western end

== Gallery ==
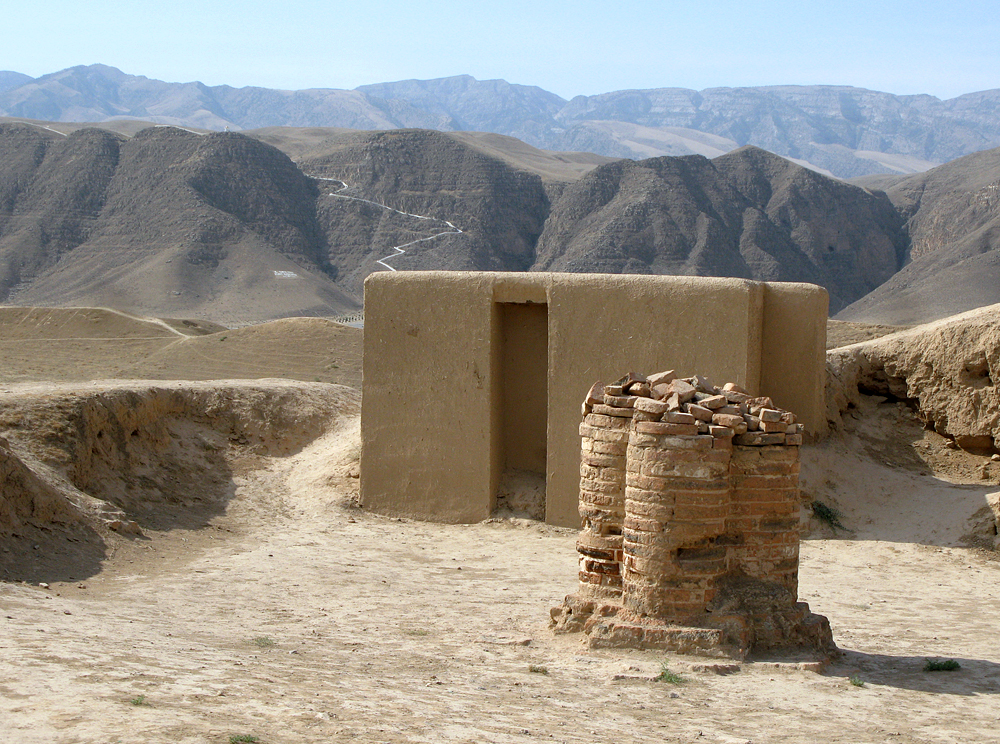

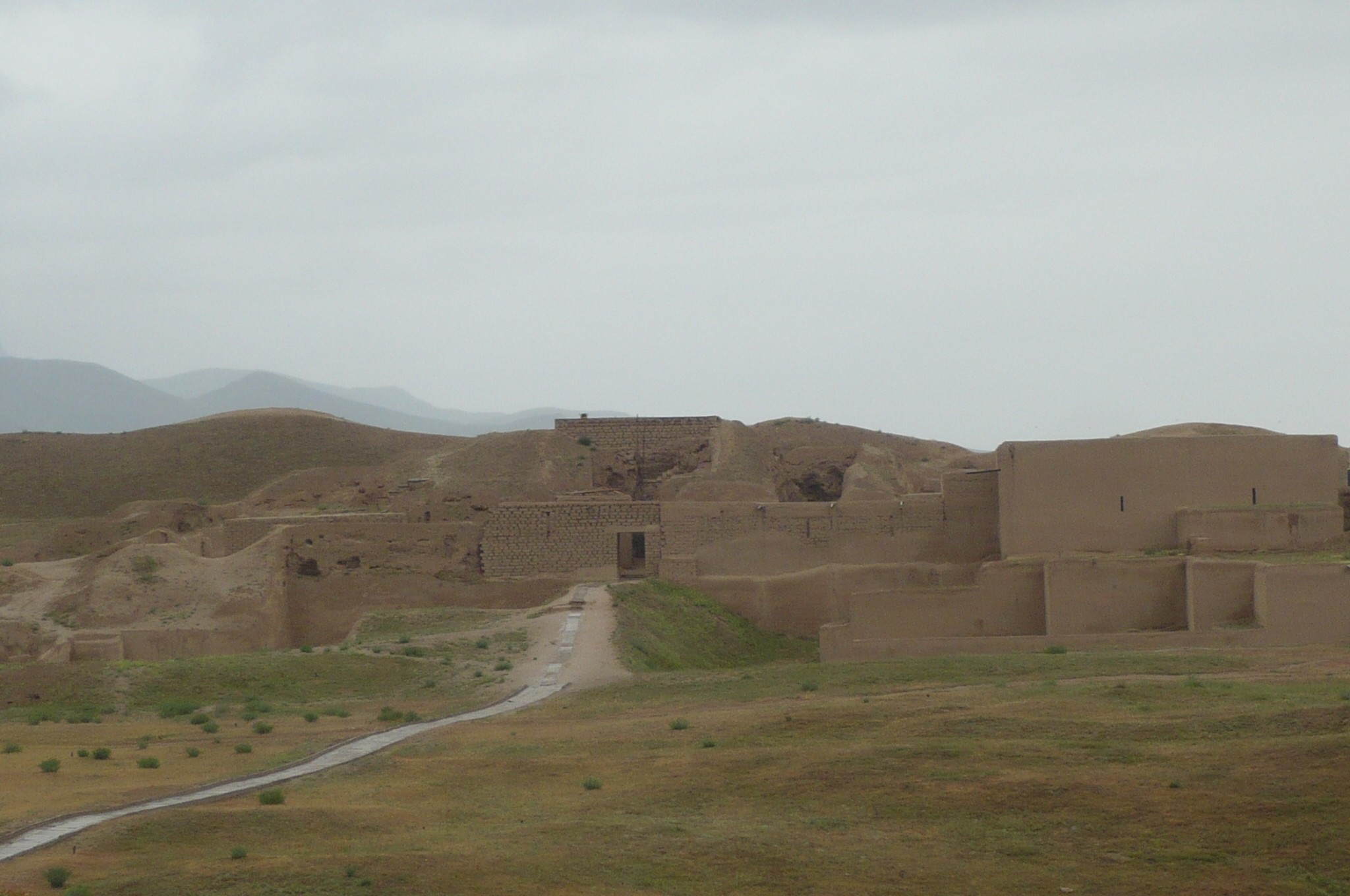
Views of Nisa wall

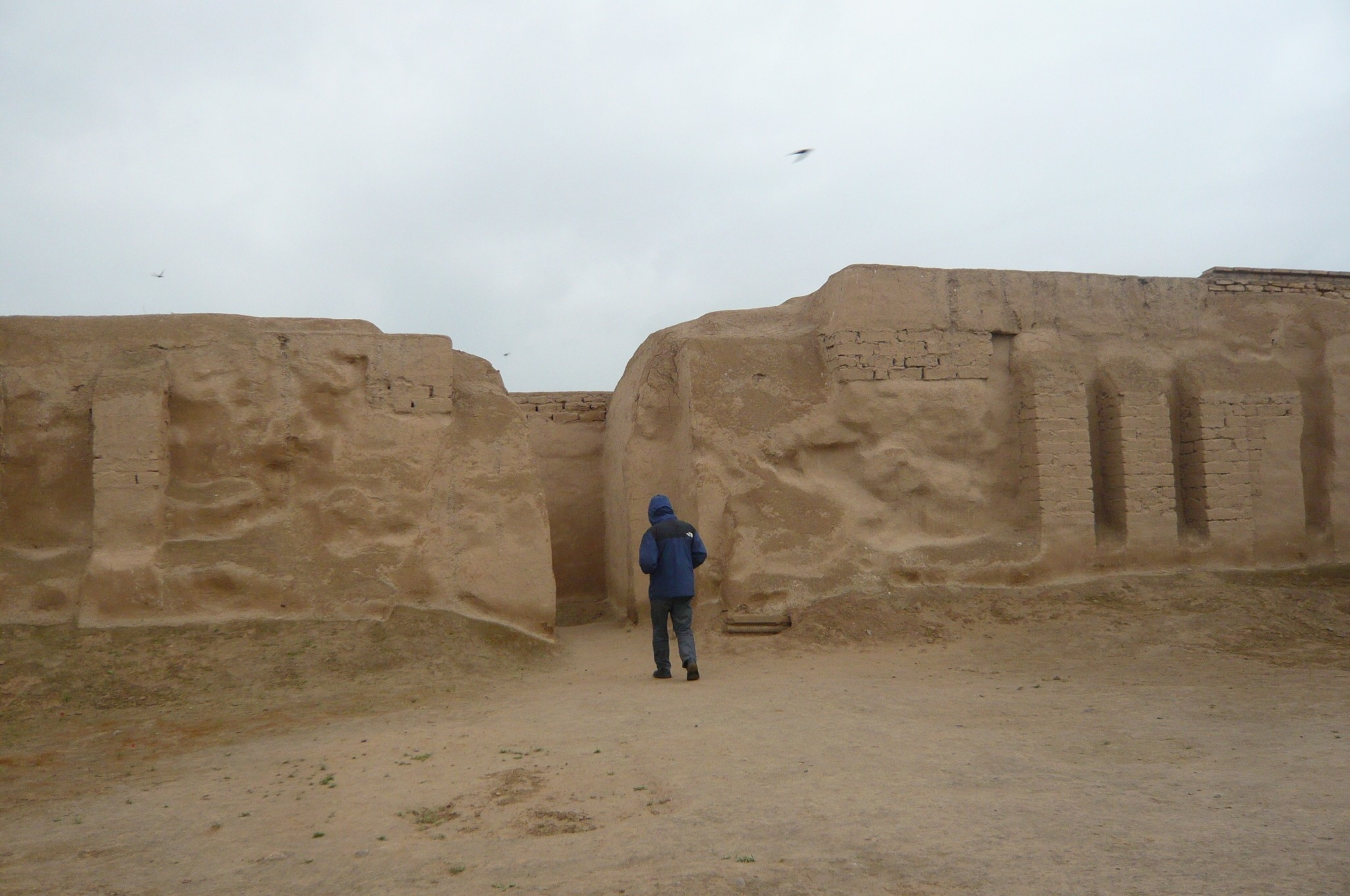
View of Nisa gate

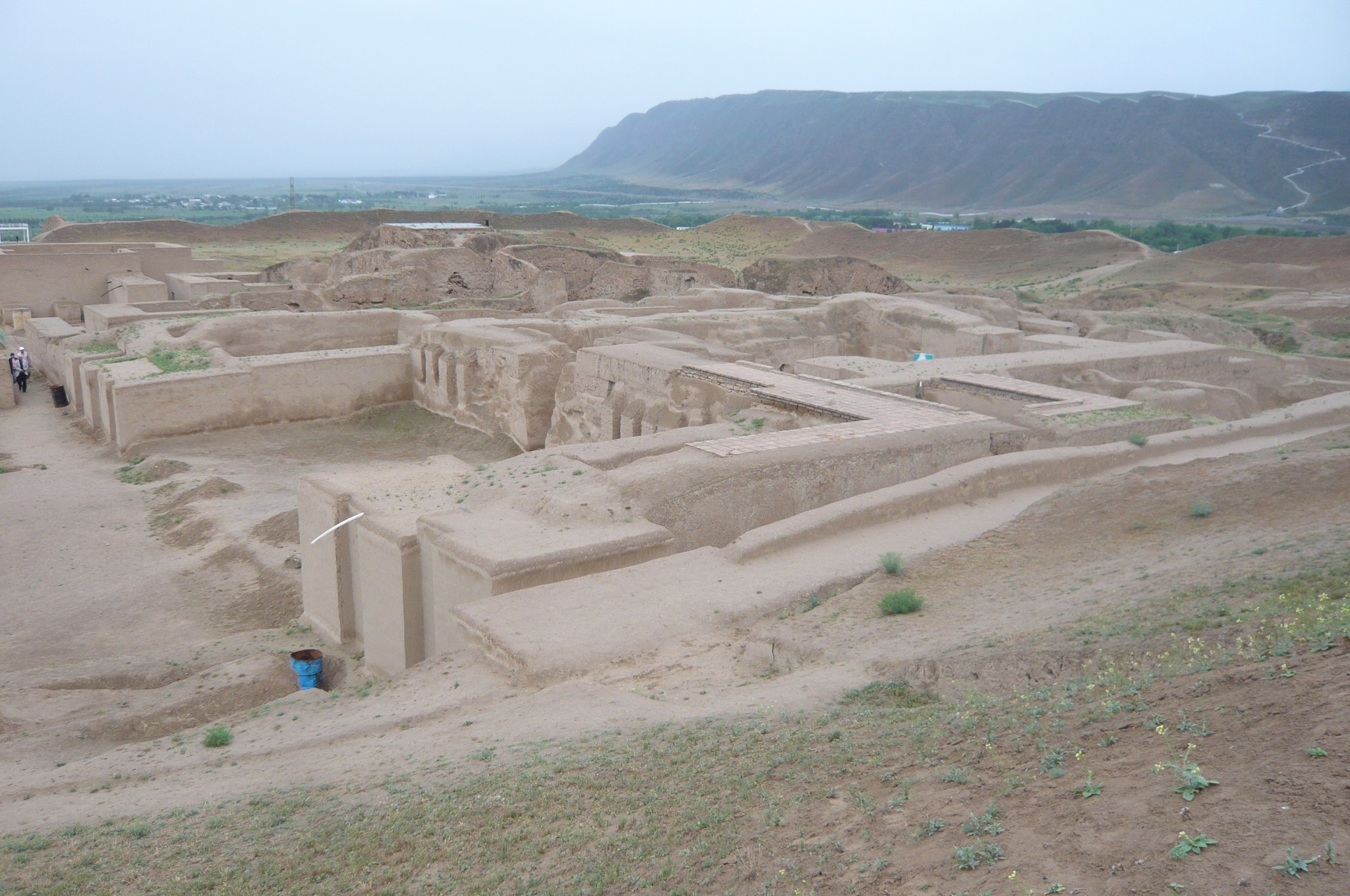
Oblique view of Nisa ruins

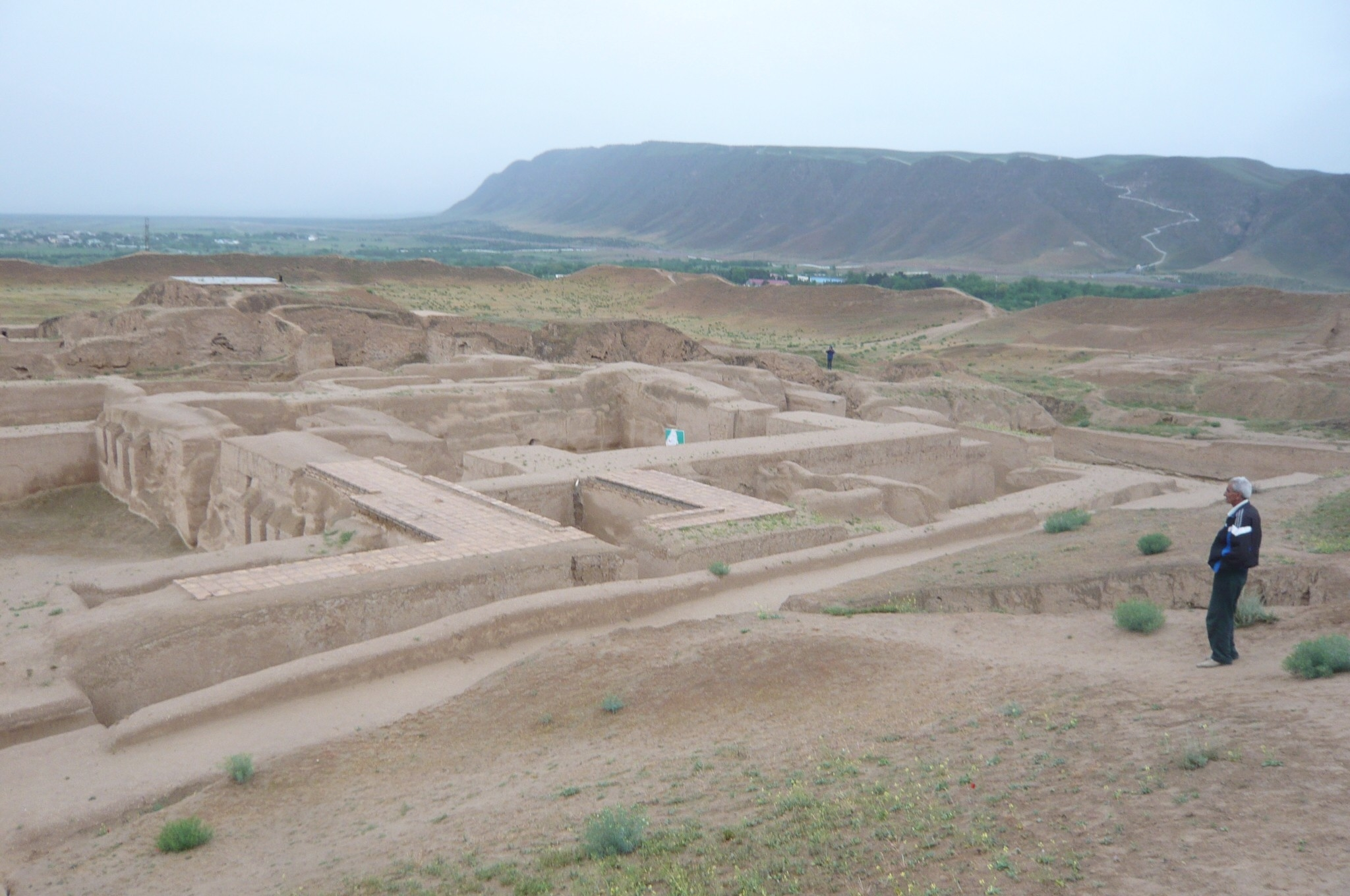
View of Nisa ruins

== See also ==
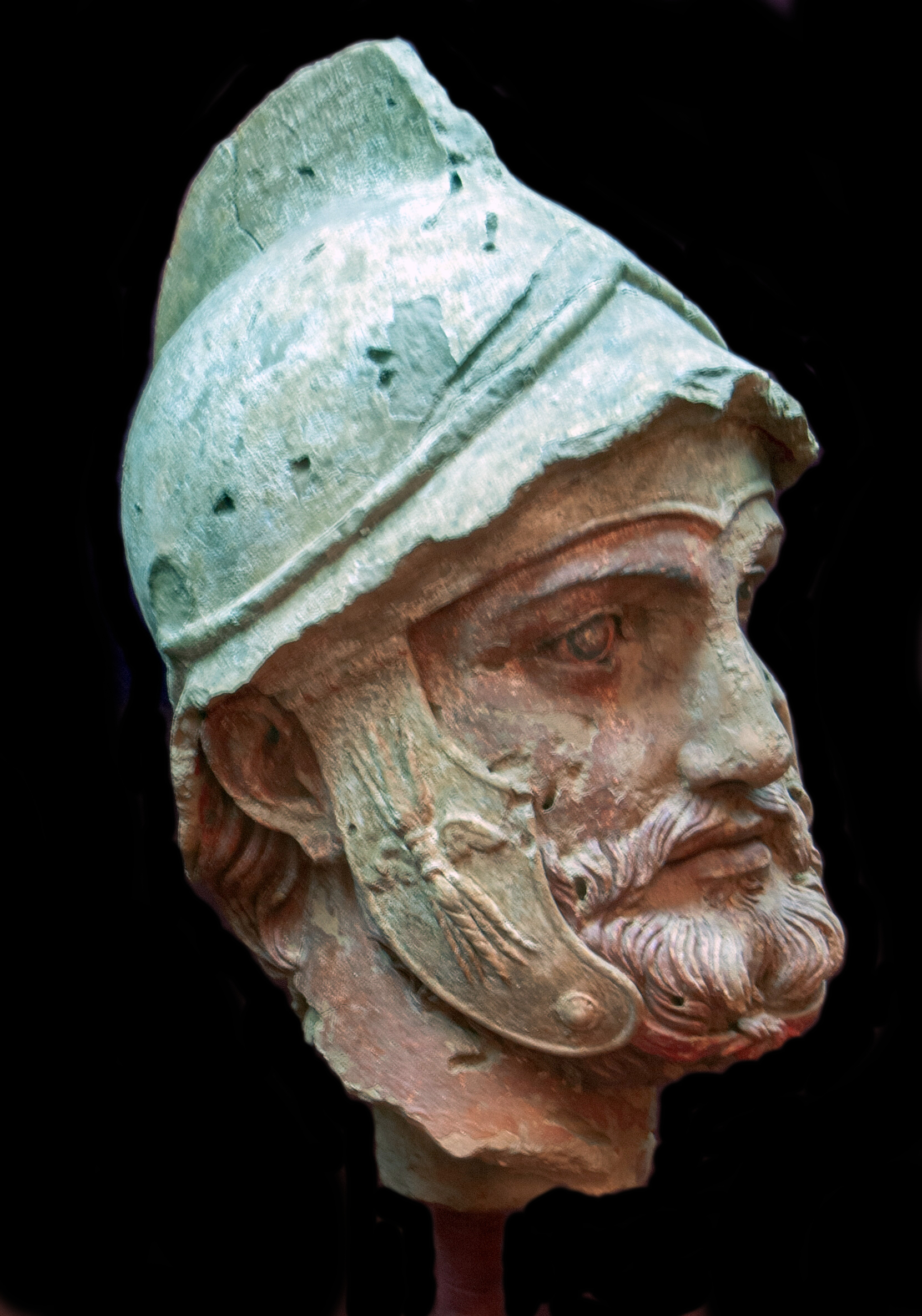
The Nisa helmeted warrior, a Hellenistic figure or deity, from the Parthian royal residence and necropolis of Nisa, 2nd century BC

- History of Turkmenistan
- List of World Heritage Sites in Turkmenistan
- Elena Abramovna Davidovich

== Bibliography ==
Sorted by year then author (see Italian Archaeological Mission in Old Nisa): Bibliography. Publications of Centro Scavi di Torino and contributions of the members of the Italian Expeditions to Nisa. Retrieved: 30 August 2009.

- MASSON M.E., PUGACHENKOVA G.A., The Parthians rhytons of Nisa, Monografie di Mesopotamia (Introduction by A. Invernizzi), Firenze, Le Lettere. 1982
- Invernizzi A., KOSHELENKO G.A., «Soviet-Italian Excavations in Old Nisa (Season 1990) », Mesopotamia, XXV, pp. 47–50. 1990
- GABUTTI A., «The Italian Excavation in Old Nisa: the Northern Corner of the Round Hall Complex», Mesopotamia XXXI, pp. 161–177, 1996
- Invernizzi A., «Archaeological research in Old Nisa 1990–1994», in La Persia e l’Asia Centrale da Alessandro al X secolo, Atti dei Convegni Lincei, 127, Roma, pp. 237–249. 1996
- Invernizzi A., «New Archaeological Research in Old Nisa, 1990–1991», in The Art and Archaeology of Ancient Persia. New Light on the Parthian and Sasanian Empire, ed. V. Sarkhosh Curtis, R. Hillenbrand, J.M. Rogers, London-New York, 8–13. 1998
- Invernizzi A., «Old Nisa and the Art of the Steppes», Bulletin of the Asia Institute, 10, 33–38. 1998
- Invernizzi A., «Parthian Nisa. New Lines of Research», in J. Wiesehöfer (ed.), Das Partherreich und seine Zeugnisse, Beiträge des internationalen Colloquiums – Eutin, 1996, (Historia Einzelschriften, 122), Stuttgart, 45–59. 1998
- Invernizzi A., «The Square House at Old Nisa», Parthica 2, pp. 13–53. 2000
- Invernizzi A., «Arsacid Dynastic Art», Parthica 3, pp. 133–157. 2001
- Invernizzi A., «Arsacid Palaces», in The Royal Palace Institution in the 1st Millennium BC (Ed. I. Nielsen), Athens, pp. 295–312. 2001
- LIPPOLIS C., book review of V.N. PILIPKO, Staraja Nisa. Zdanie s Kvadratnym Zalom, Moskva, 1996, su Parthica, 3, 2001, 2001
  pp. 221–234. 2001
- KOSHELENKO G, LAPCHIN A., «Ricerche nel complesso del Tempio Rotondo a Nisa Vecchia», Parthica 4, pp. 9–45. 2002
- LIPPOLIS C., «Novije Issledovanija Staroj Nisji», Kulturnye Ziennosti 2000–2001, Ashkhabad. 2003
- LIPPOLIS C., «Nisa-Mithradatkert: the building to the north of the Round Hall. Preliminary Report of the 2000–2001 excavations campaign», Central Asia Cultural Values, vol. I, n. 2, June 2003, p. 1–17. 2003
- LIPPOLIS C., book review of PILIPKO V.N., Staraja Nisa – Osnovnye itogi arheologicheskogo izuchenija v sovetskij period, su Parthica 5, 2003, p. 3–13. 2003
- Invernizzi A., «The culture of Nisa, between steppe and empire», After Alexander-Central Asia before Islam. Themes in the history and archaeology of Western Central Asia, British Academy Conference, 23–25 June 2004.
- Invernizzi A., «Thoughts on Parthian Nisa», in Parthica 6, pp. 133–143. 2004
- Invernizzi A., «Representations of Gods in Parthian Nisa», Parthica 7 (2005), pp. 71–80. 2005
- Daryaee, Touraj (2012). The Oxford Handbook of Iranian History. Oxford University Press. pp. 1–432. ISBN 978-0-19-987575-7.
