= Pi (instrument) =

Quadruple reed oboes of Thailand

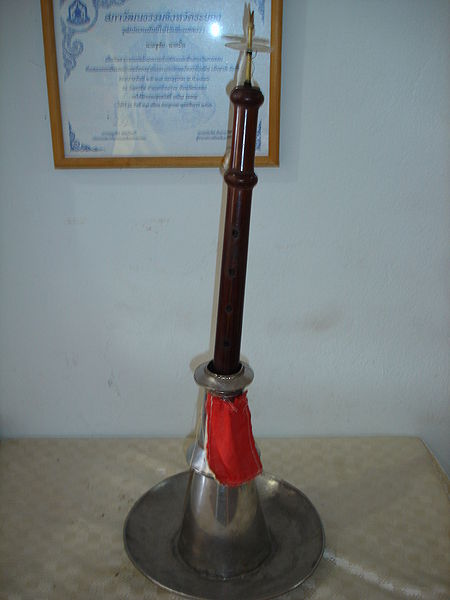
Pi mon

Pi (Thai: ปี่, pronounced [pìː]) is the generic term for any of a variety of quadruple reed oboes used in the traditional music of Thailand, piphat. It is very similar in construction and playing technique to Burmese Hne and Cambodian sralai.

== Varieties ==
- Pi chawa (ปี่ชวา)
- Pi klang (ปี่กลาง)
- Pi mon (ปี่มอญ)
- Pi nai (ปี่ใน)
- Pi nok (ปี่นอก)
- Pi chanai (ปี่ไฉน)
- Pi nae (ปี่แน)

An entirely different instrument, a bamboo free reed pipe called pi chum (ปี่จุม), is used by the Lanna of Northern Thailand.

== Pi nok ==
The pi nok is smallest among pi nok, klang, and nai. Pi noks have been played since the ancient times.

== Pi nai ==
=== Summary ===
Pi nai is Thailand traditional Double reedWoodwind instrument.It mainly use in Piphat band.

==== Origin ====
Pi nai was predict that It was build in Sukhothai Kingdom(1249A.D.-1438A.D.).It is the developed from ancient Instrument call Re lai

==== Component ====
Pi nai is the biggest of all Instrument in this type of shape instrument.It length is 42 Centimetre

== Pi cha nai ==
The pi chanai is pi song thon (ปี่สองท่อน, pi that consists of two parts). The body part is called lao pi (เลาปี่), the mouthpiece part is called "lamphong" (ลำโพง). Both parts are made from wood or ivory. It is presumed that the Thais obtained this musical influence from India due to its similarity to the Indian shehnai. Pi have been used in Thai since the Sukhothai period. At present, it is played together with the pi chawa in parades and in concerts.

== Pi chawa ==
The pi chawa is pi song thon (ปี่สองท่อน) (a pi that consists of two parts) like the pi chanai, but longer. It is made from hardwood or ivory. It is presumed Thais took on introducing the pi chawa at the same time as the glong khaek. From some evidence, they used the pi chawa in Krabuan Phayuhayattra (กระบวนพยุหยาตรา, military march) in the pre-Ayutthaya period. The pi chawa today is used mostly in the Sarama and phleng muay music that accompanies muay Thai matches, as well as in funeral rites. K

== Pi chum ==
The pi chum (Thai: ปี่จุม) is a musical instrument from northern Thailand. It is like an oboe. It is found in the provinces of Chiang Mai, Chiang Rai, Lampoon and Lampang. People play a pi chum for their activity. The word "chum" in Thai means "group", so when people play a pi chum, they play as a group.

=== Construction ===
The body of the pi chum is made from bamboo. The pipe and the reed are made from copper. A pi chum has seven holes on the body that are used to set the tone of played. There are four types of pi chum that are separated by size, length and voice. The first one is the pi mae (Thai: ปี่แม่) which has a length of 70–80 cm. It is larger than other pi chums and has a bass voice. The second one is the pi krang (Thai: ปี่กลาง), which is smaller than the pi mae. It has a length of 60–65 cm. and it has a balance voice. The third one is pi koy (Thai: ปี่ก้อย), which is smaller than the pi krang but bigger than the pi tad. It has a length of 45–55 cm. The voice of the pi koy is treble. The last type is the pi tad (Thai: ปี่ตัด) or pi lek (Thai: ปี่เล็ก), which is the smallest pi chum. It has a length 35–40 cm. The voice of pi tad is treble but higher than the pi koy. A group that has all four instruments is called a ‘pi chum si’ (Thai: ปี่จุมสี่) and a group that has three instruments is called a ‘pi chum sarm’ (Thai: ปี่จุมสาม).

== Pi mon ==
The pi mon is pi song thon (ปี่สองท่อน, pi that consist of two parts) like pi chawa but greater. Lao pi (เลาปี่, the body of pi) is made from wood. Lamphong (ลำโพง, the mouth of pi) is made from metal. The pi mon is played usually in the piphat mon ensemble or in the old called pi phat raman ensemble. This type can be played in any occasion as well, like funerals and concerts.

== Pi nae ==
The pi nae is the northern Thai equivalent of the Burmese hne. It is often played in ensembles in northern Thailand that are similar to the piphat, piphat mon, and hsaing waing traditions.

== See also ==
- Piphat
- Traditional Thai musical instruments
- Pey au
- Pey pok
