= Hne =

Burmese musical instrument

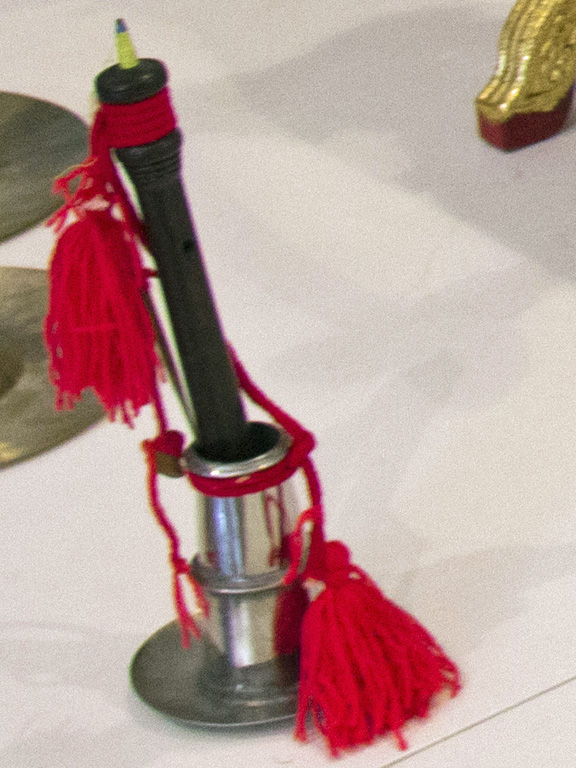
- Classification: Wind instrument

Related instruments
- Shawm Pi (instrument)

The hne (Burmese: နှဲ; also spelled hnè) is a conical shawm of double reed used in the music of Myanmar.

== Etymology ==
The earliest extant written occurrence of the word hne dates to 1491 AD and is likely a Middle Mon loan word, derived from sanoy. This sanoy derived from Persian loan word "Shanai".

== Description ==
The hne (Burmese: နှဲ) has a sextuple reed (called hnegan), made from the young leaf of the toddy palm, which is soaked for six months. The body of the hne is made of wood, with a conical bore and seven finger holes at the front, set in a straight line, with a bell (ချူ, chu) hung at the top. It has a flaring metal bell and has a loud tone, and is used in an ensemble together with xylophone, tuned gongs, and tuned drums. There are two distinct forms: the smaller form is called the hne galay (နှဲကလေး), while the larger is called the hne gyi (နှဲကြီး). The former is used for songs in the ordinary key of the diatonic major scale, while the latter is used for grand style songs in the subdominant mode.
