= Shehnai =

Indian reed musical instrument

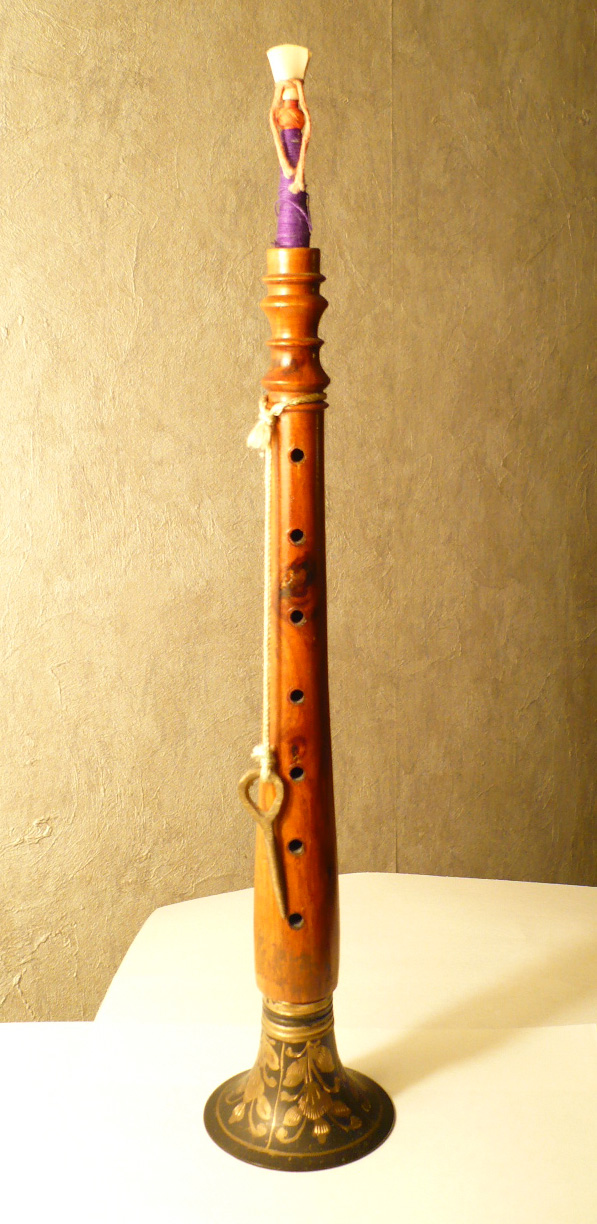
- Other names: Sharnai, saanai, sahnai, sanai, serunai, shahnai, shanai, shenai, shehnaai, shenoy
- Classification: Double reed; Wind; Aerophone

Related instruments
- Nadaswaram; Sundari/Mukhaveene; Suona; Hne; Sopila; Zurna

The shehnai (also spelled shenai) is a musical instrument from South Asia. It is made of wood, with a double reed at one end and a metal or wooden flared bell at the other end. It was one of the nine instruments found in the Mughal royal court. The shehnai is similar to South India's nadaswaram.

== Characteristics ==
This tubular instrument gradually broadens towards the lower end. It usually has between six and nine holes. It employs one set of quadruple reeds, making it a quadruple reed woodwind. To master the instrument, the musician must employ various and intricate embouchure and fingering techniques.

The shehnai has a range of two octaves, from the A below middle C to the A one line above the treble clef (A3 to A5 in scientific pitch notation). A shehnai is often but not always made with a body of wood or bamboo and a flared metal end.

== Origin of the shehnai ==
The shehnai is thought to have been brought by the Mughal Empire as its use was most associated with the Mughal courts.

The shehnai is believed to have originated from ancient India having evolved from the pungi instrument. The shehnai was adapted for classical music to be performed in front of royal courts. Its name is thought to derive from the Persian words "shah" (king) and "nai" (flute), a name appropriate for the status of its audience.

=== Etymology ===
Several folk etymologies and scholarly theories exist regarding the name shehnai.

According to a widely cited legend, Emperor Aurangzeb banned the playing of the pungi in his royal court because of its shrill sound. A barber (nai) from a family of professional musicians subsequently improved the instrument by fashioning a longer, broader pipe with seven holes, producing a softer and more melodious tone. Since the new instrument was first played in the Shah's chambers and its creator was a nai, the instrument came to be called shehnai. A variant of this legend holds that the name derives from the combination of shāh (king) and nai (flute), meaning "the king's flute" or "royal flute".

Another theory proposes that shehnai is a modification of sur-nāl (from sur, meaning musical note or melody, and nāl/nālī/nād, meaning pipe or reed in several Indian languages). Musicologist Dileep Karanth has argued that the sur-nāl may also be the etymological root of the surna/zurna, the name by which similar reed-pipes are known throughout the Middle East and Eastern Europe.

== Similar instruments ==
The counterparts to the shehnai played in Western India and Coastal Karnataka are indigenous to the territory. Shehnai players were/are an integral part of the Goan/Konkani region and the temples along the western coast and the players are called Vajantri and were allotted lands for services rendered to the temples.

== Music ==
The shehnai is played during religious festivities and wedding celebrations.

== Gallery ==
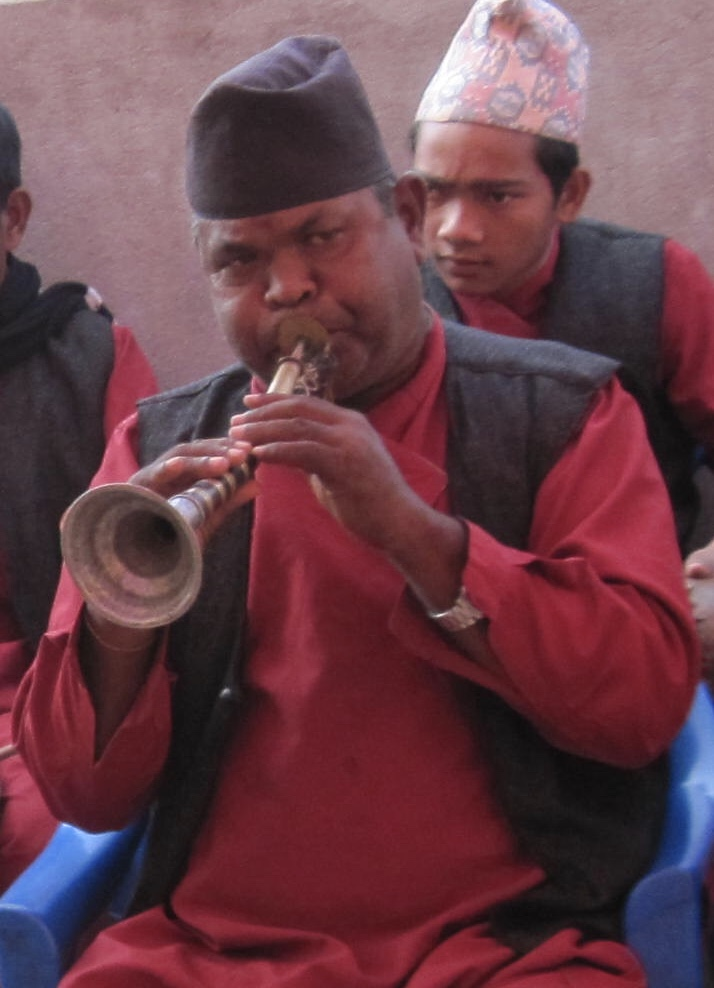
The Nepalese version, called the sahane, has a curve and is played in the panche baja.

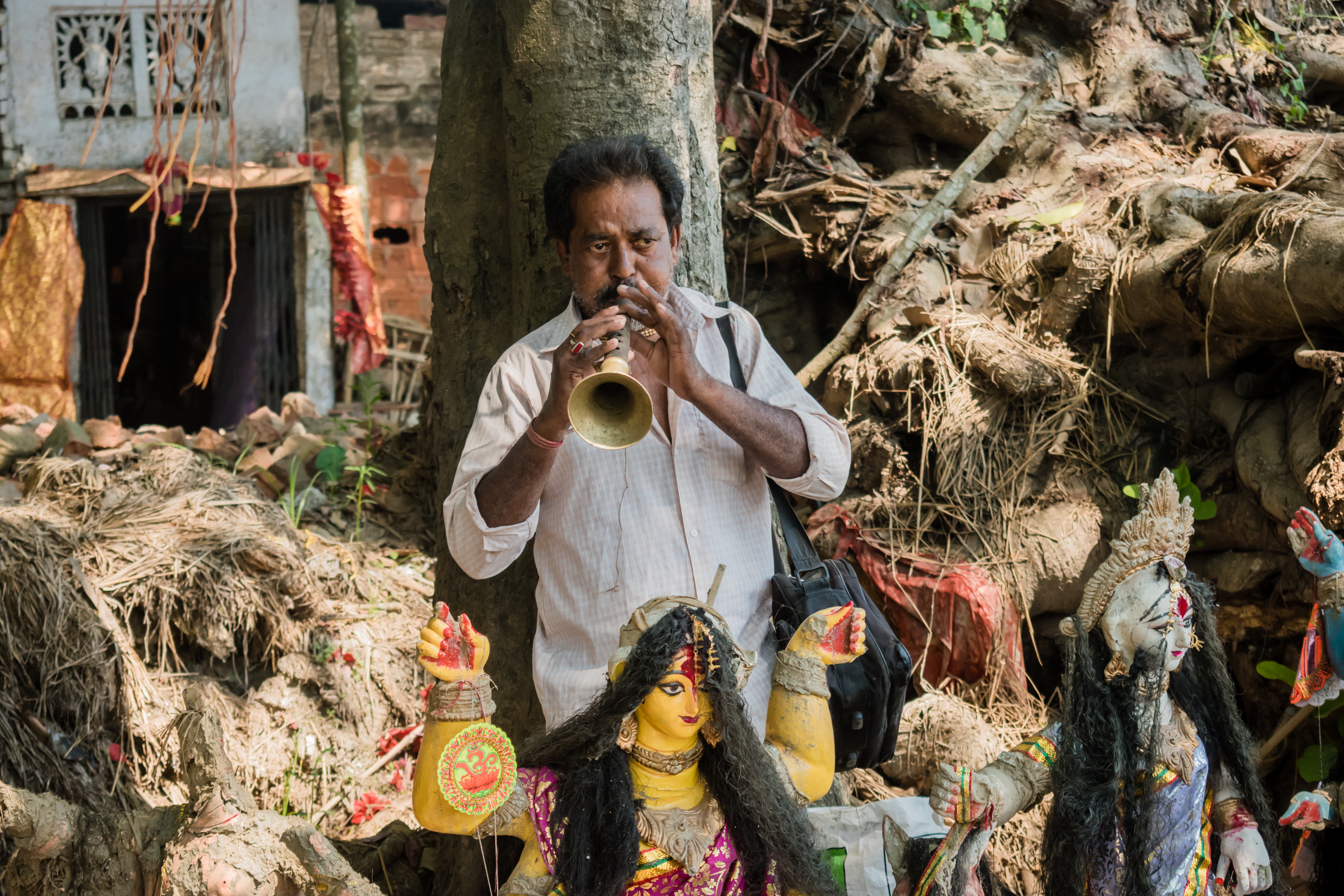
A shehnai player

== Notable Indian shehnai players ==
- Ali Ahmed Hussain Khan
- Anant Lal
- Bismillah Khan
- Lokesh Anand
- S Ballesh Bhajantri

== Other related wind instruments ==
- Mizmar, a shawm similar to the shehnai
- Nadaswaram, a similar South Indian instrument
- Reed instrument, a type of woodwind instrument
- Shawm, a type of reed instrument
