= Music of Himachal Pradesh =

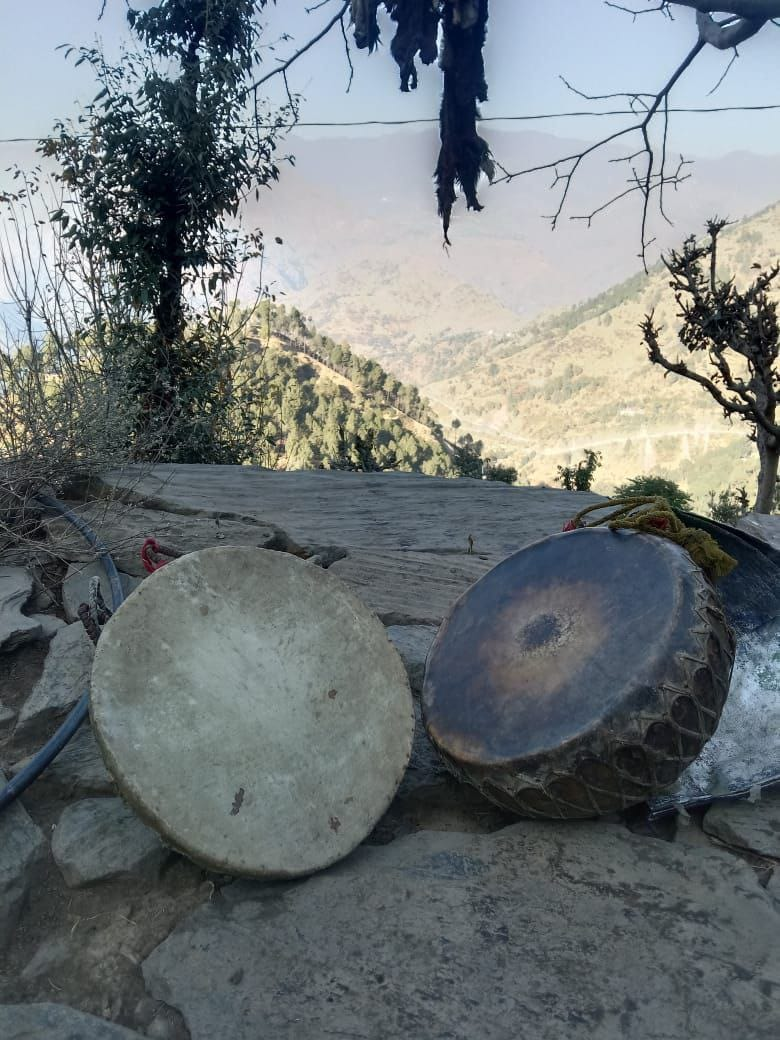
Bajantri Dhol

The music of Himachal Pradesh includes many kinds of folk songs from the area, many of which are sung without accompaniment.

== Styles ==
External videos
- Dev Taal of Jubbal-Rohru
- Dev Taal of Kotkhai-Theog

Jhoori is a type of song that celebrates extramarital romance.The word means lover . It is popular in Shimla, Solan and Sirmaur, and is accompanied by a female dance called jhoomar.

Laman songs from Kullu Valley are another type of love song.

Saṃskāra songs are sung at festivals and celebrations by women of Himachal Pradesh. These songs are based on ragas, which are compositions of Indian classical music, as are the martial jhanjhotis.

Ainchaliyan are religious songs, sung at the bride's house after a wedding and by women at the home of an unmarried girl.

In Chamba-Pangi, wandering musicians play a khanjari (tambourine) and perform, also using string puppets.

== Musical instruments ==
=== Percussion ===
Himachal Pradesh folk music features a wide variety of drums, including dammama, damanght, gajju, doru, dhaunsa, nagara, dholku, nagarth, tamaka, dafale, dhol, dolki and hudak. Non-drum percussion instruments include the ghanta and ghariyal (gongs), chimta (tongs), manjira and jhanjh (cymbals), ghungru (bells), thali (platter) and kokatha murchang.

=== Winds ===
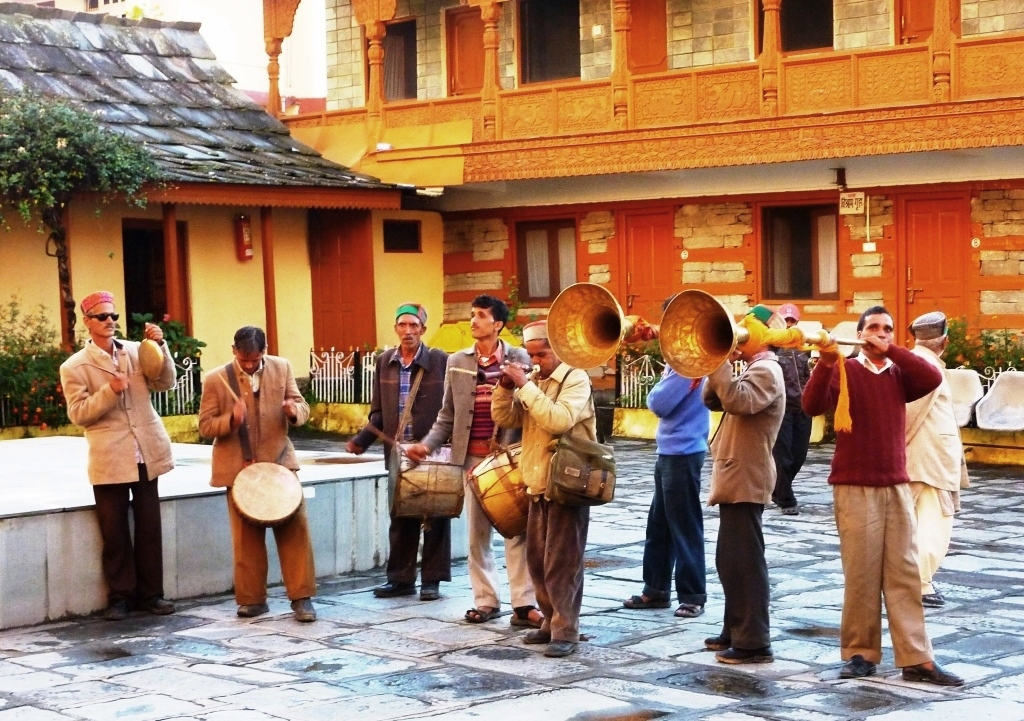
Band at the Royal Palace, Sarahan, HP, India

There are also wind instruments like algoja/algoza (twin flutes), peepni, shehnai (oboe), bishudi (flute), karnal (straight brass trumpet) and ranasingha (curved brass trumpet).

=== Strings ===
String instruments include gramyang, riwana (a small fretless lute), sarangi (bowed lute), jumang, ruman, ektara and kindari davatra.

=== Singers ===
Mohit Chauhan's 'morni', Karnail Rana's various folk songs, Dheeraj's love songs and Thakur Das Rathi's 'Naatis' has given great contribution to the music of Himachal Pradesh. New initiatives like Mountain Music Project and Laman are giving Himachali folk a contemporary sound. Others like Som Dutt Battu, a Padma Shri awardee, popularised the folk music and vocal classical music of Himachal Pradesh.

=== Modern Himachali Music ===
Some of the recent theatre and music personalities like GS Chani and his son Gyan have documented the music of the ethnic communities of the Himalayas, including Himachal, and have created documentaries preserving the rich oral traditions with modern mix to reflect the many aspects of the life, the hardships, loneliness, cosmology, nature, love of the people living in the Himalayas.

== Comments ==
Kangana Ranaut, an Indian actress and politician, raised about the dying Himachal Pradesh music in the parliament. She said: "I would also like to add that the folk music of Himachal Pradesh, especially the tribal music from Spiti, Kinnaur and Bharmour, and their folk and art forms are also on the verge on extinction."
