= Karnal (instrument) =

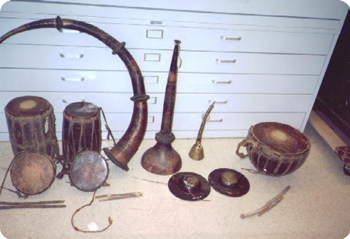
- Panche baja instruments: dholak (drums), tyamko (small kettledrums, leaning on dholak drums), narsiha (a long, S-shaped trumpet), Karnal (a wide-mouthed, straight trumpet, center), shehnai (a folk oboe, right of karnal), damaha (large kettledrum), and jhyali (cymbals).

Brass instrument
- Classification: brass
- Hornbostel–Sachs classification: 423.121 (Natural trumpets – There are no means of changing the pitch apart from the player's lips; end-blown trumpets – The mouth-hole faces the axis of the trumpet.)

Related instruments
- Alphorn; karnay; Tibetan horn

The karnal (Nepali:कर्नाल) is a large, straight brass trumpet, over a metre long, played in parts of Northern India and Nepal. It has a prominent bell resembling a datura flower. It is used on ceremonial occasions, such as the processions of village deities. It is often included among the five instruments of the Nepali pancai baja ensemble.

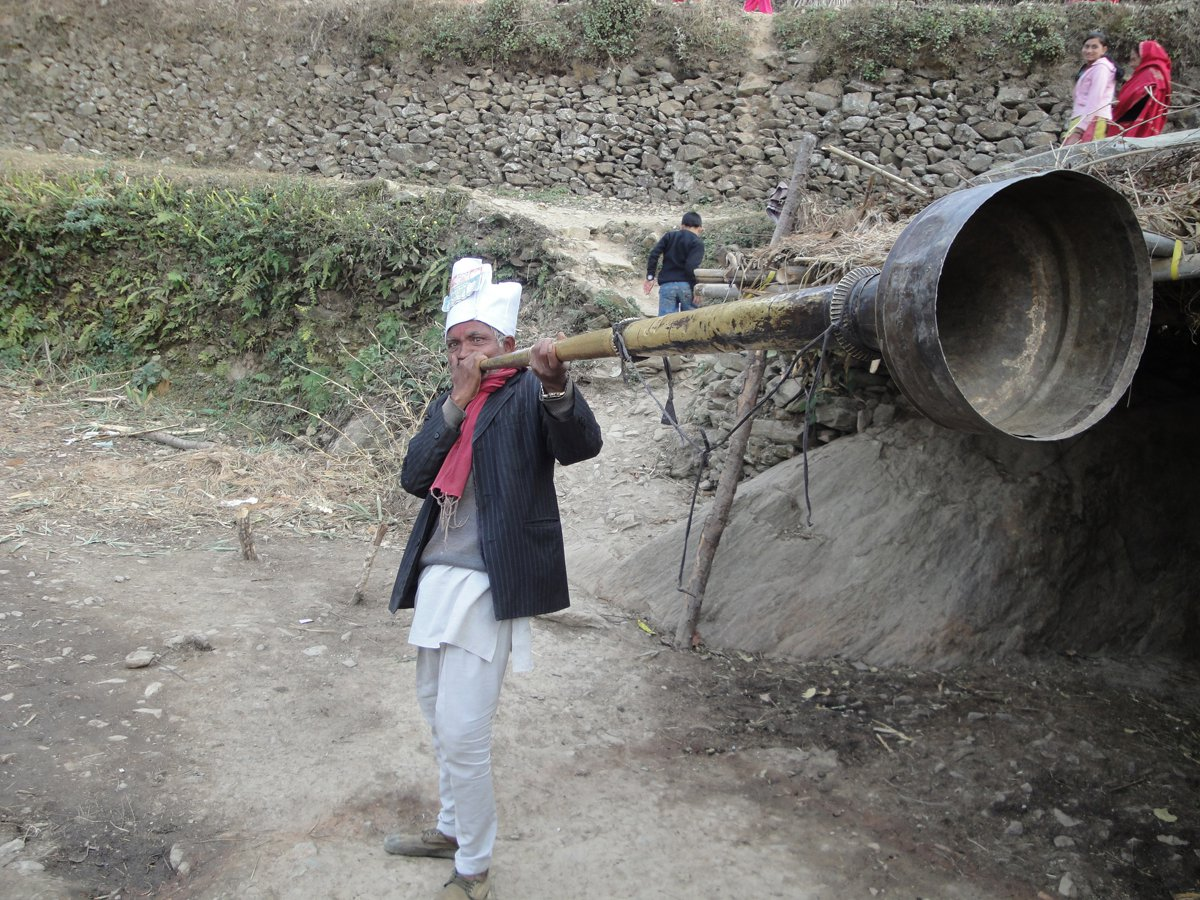
Brass trumpet Annapurna karnal with wide bell in Central Nepal.

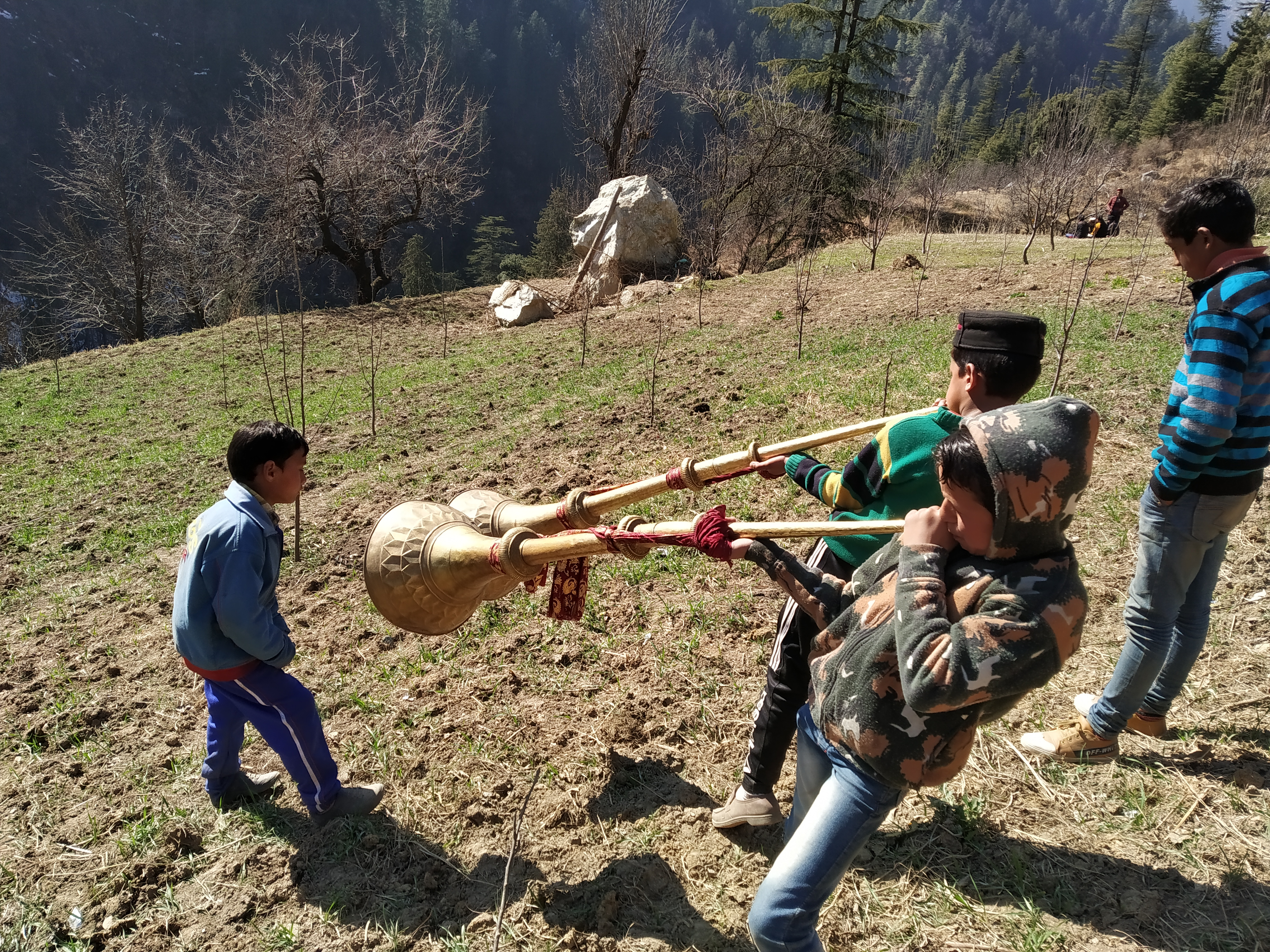
Karnal trumpet in Kullu district, Himachal Pradesh

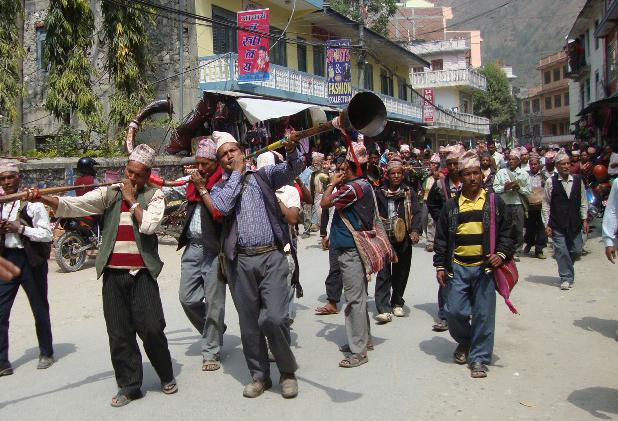
Nepal. Straight trumpets karnal. Curved trumpet Ransingha.

== See also ==
- Karnay
