= Hudák =

Hudák, Hudak
Origin
- Language: Slovak
- Meaning: Musician
- Region of origin: Slovakia

Other names
- Variant form: Hudáček

Hudák or Hudak is a Slovak surname, and is a variant of the name "Hudec" hudobník, meaning "musician", derived from the word "hudba"= music.

"Druhým najčastejším priezviskom v Prešove je Hudák. Majtán píše, že bolo odvodené od slovesa húsť – hudiem, s významom „hrať na nejakom hudobnom nástroji, najmä však na gajdách alebo na husliach“."

Čítajte viac: https://domov.sme.sk/c/23405261/slovensko-ludia-priezvisko-vyznam-vyskyt.html

The name may refer to:

- Dávid Hudák (born 1993), Slovak football player
- Erin Rachel Hudak (born 1978), American artist
- Evie Hudak (born 1951), American politician
- Harald Hudak (1957–2024), German middle-distance runner
- Jen Hudak (born 1986), American skier
- Ľuboš Hudák (born 1968), Slovak handball player
- Mike Hudak (born 1952), American environmentalist
- Paul Hudak (1952–2015), American computer scientist
- Pavol Hudák (1959–2011), Slovak writer
- Tim Hudak (born 1967), Canadian politician

== See also ==
- Hudak Peak, Antarctica
