= Pot drum =

Pot drum may refer to:

- Kettle drum, a broad class of drums with a rounded bottom
- Membranophone, any musical instrument which produces sound by vibration of a stretched membrane
