= Kettledrum =

Type of percussion instrument

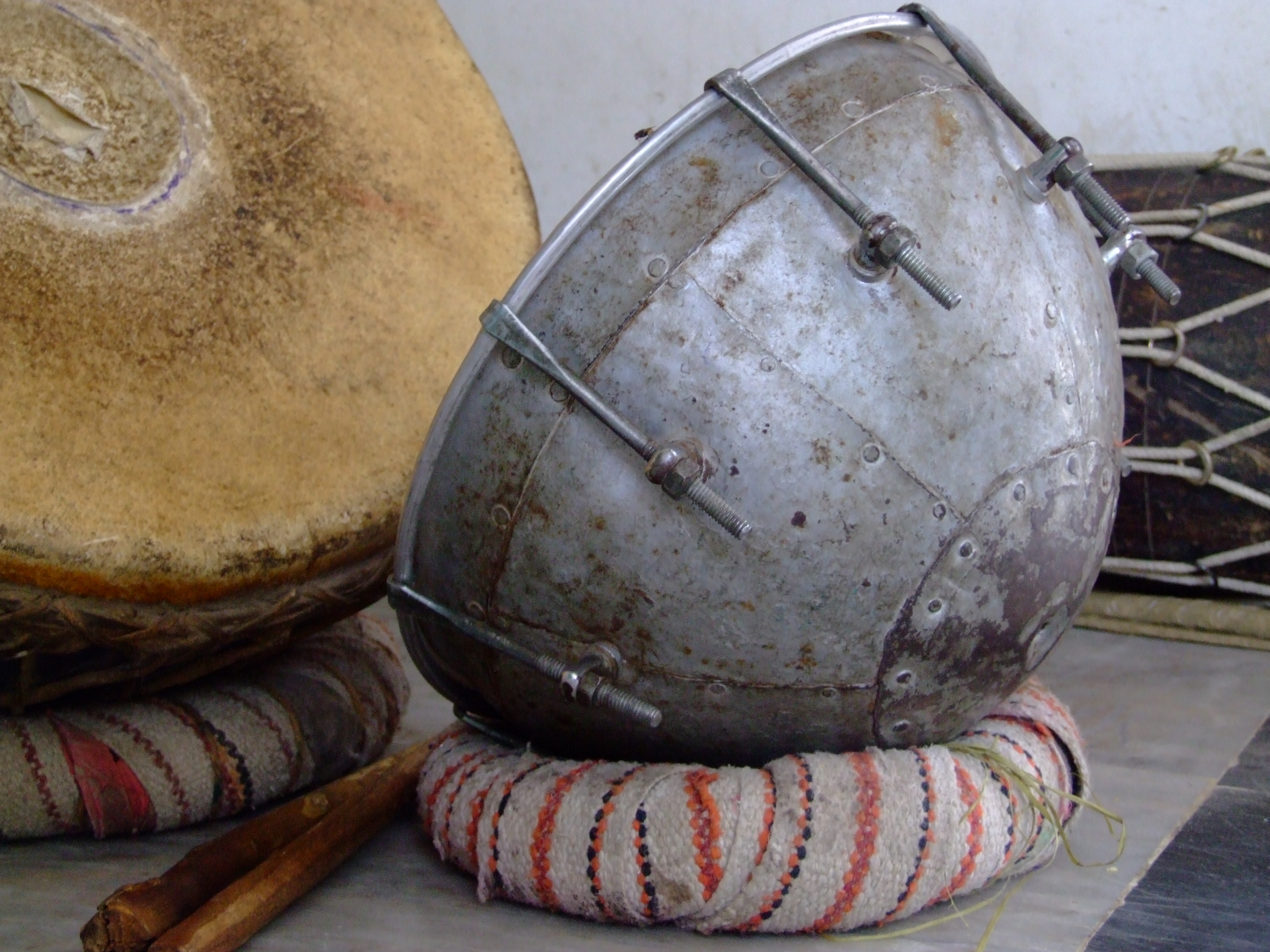
A nagara from Rajasthan

A kettledrum (or kettle drum) (/ˈkɛtldrʌm/) is a type of percussion instrument in which a membrane is stretched over a large hemispherical bowl. Traditionally, the bowl is made of a metal such as copper or bronze, but materials such as clay and wood are also used.

In Western music, timpani are the most commonly used types of kettledrums, so much so that their names have almost become synonymous. However, most cultures, especially those of South Asia and the Middle East, have their own distinct types of kettledrums. In the Hornbostel–Sachs system, kettledrums were given the number '211.1' as part of their own unique classification.

== Construction ==
Kettledrums can differ greatly in the shape of their bowls, even among instruments that are classified as the same type. For example, timpani may be parabolic, cambered, or elliptical in shape. The exact way the shape of the bowl affects the sound is debated. The type of animal hide that forms the drumhead differs from different instruments, but calfskin is the most common. Many types of kettledrums continue to use animal hide even after the invention of synthetic Mylar drumheads in the 20th century. Drumheads may be held down and tuned through either traditional rope-tension or the more modern hoop and bolts system. Less commonly, the heads may simply be nailed or glued on.

=== Acoustics ===
The sound of kettledrums is determined by multiple factors, including the material, thickness, and collar of the head, as well as the shape, size, and material of the bowl. Due to the bowl reflecting the dominant pitch of the head, most kettledrums, such as the timpani and tabla, produce a definite pitch when struck.

== History ==
Early examples of musical instruments shaped into kettles appeared in Southeast Asia during the 6th century BCE and now serve as late Bronze Age artifacts. The Đông Sơn drums of Vietnam are one such example, made using the lost-wax casting technique. However, these instruments were not membranophones, as true kettledrums are. They were idiophones, bearing greater similarity in both sound and construction to large, pitched gongs.

The earliest true kettledrums were likely simple instruments, made by stretching animal hides over clay pots. Other materials, such as wood or tortoiseshell, may also have been used in its early history. Tablets in Mesopotamia, around the time of the Achaemenid Empire, give instructions for constructing a bronze drum called the lilissu or lilis. This drum, outfitted with a head made from bull hide, was used chiefly in religious ceremonies as a representation of the heart of a god.

Kettledrums have a long history of serving as war drums, particularly within cavalry units. Their first use in battle is first attested to the Parthian Empire, who used them for battlefield coordination and to terrify the opposing army. The use of kettledrums continued through the Sasanian Empire, where they were gradually employed with signaling horns or trumpets. This practice developed across multiple Middle Eastern cultures, including within the Byzantine Empire, giving rise to various forms of the drum known as the naqareh. The instrument subsequently disseminated to Europe and India, where it evolved into the naker and nagara, respectively.

The word "kettledrum" first appeared in English through the writings of Thomas Seymour to Henry VIII in 1542 after the king had ordered several sets from Vienna to be used in battle.

== Types ==
Name	Place of Origin	Description
Bara	West Africa	Also known as the bendre, it consists of a head made of goatskin stretched over a hollowed gourd. It is used by the Gur where it accompanies the balafon.
Bāyāñ	India	This is the lower-pitched drum in a set of tabla. A type of hand drum, the player can change the pitch of the drum by pressing the heel of the palm into the head.
Damaha	Nepal	One of the five main instruments in the Panchai ensemble, this large kettledrum contrasts the smaller tyamko. It has a neck strap to be carried and is played with a pair of wooden mallets. The Nepalese Damai caste, largely made up of musicians, takes its name from the instrument.
Duggi	Bengal	A hand drum used in Baul music. It may be played by itself or in pairs.
Kayum	Mesoamerica	Named after the Lacandon god of song, it was a clay hand drum used in Mayan religious ceremonies.
Kudüm	Turkey	This is a pair of kettledrums consisting of the smaller tek and the larger düm. Played with soft, wooden mallets, they are an important part of Mevlevi musical ensembles.
Kūrgā	Mongolia	This was a very large kettledrum introduced to the Islamic world through the Mongols. It is considered the precursor, if not the same drum as, the tabl al kabir.
Kus	Persia	From the Aramaic word kūša, meaning "march", this was a war drum found alongside the karnay in Ancient Persia.
Lytavry	Ukraine	Also known as tulumbas, these were used by the Cossacks for signaling.
Marfa	Yemen	Originally from Yemen, these drums were brought to Hyderabad by immigrants, where they provide the driving rhythm for the eponymous Indian dance. It is sometimes played with the tāsa drum in the tribal areas of Yemen.
Nagara	India	This drum is a descendant of the naqareh and used in various folk, military, and religious settings.
Naqareh	Middle East	These drums were usually found in pairs and used for various purposes, from processional music to religious ceremonies. It was imported to Europe, where it became known as the naker, and to India. It is the direct ancestor of modern timpani and the bāyāñ tabla drum.
Negarit	Ethiopia	These drums were mainly used in processional music for Ethiopian emperors and aristocrats up until the dissolution of the monarchy in 1974.
Tāsa	India	This ancient drum from Northwest India eventually became popular in the Caribbean to form part of the tassa ensemble.
Tbilat	Morocco	These are a pair of ceramic hand drums played in similar fashion as bongos.
Timpani	Europe	This is a standard percussion instrument within Western classical music.
Tyamko	Nepal	One of the five main instruments in the Panchai ensemble, this small kettledrum contrasts the larger damaha. It has a neck strap to be carried and is played with a pair of wooden mallets.
