= Belloneon =

Mechanical musical instrument

The belloneon (or bellonion) was a mechanical musical instrument consisting of twenty-four trumpets and two kettle drums. It was invented in Dresden in 1812 by Johann and Friedrich Kaufmann.
