= Kettle drums (Metropolitan Museum of Art) =

Drums by Franz Peter Bunsen

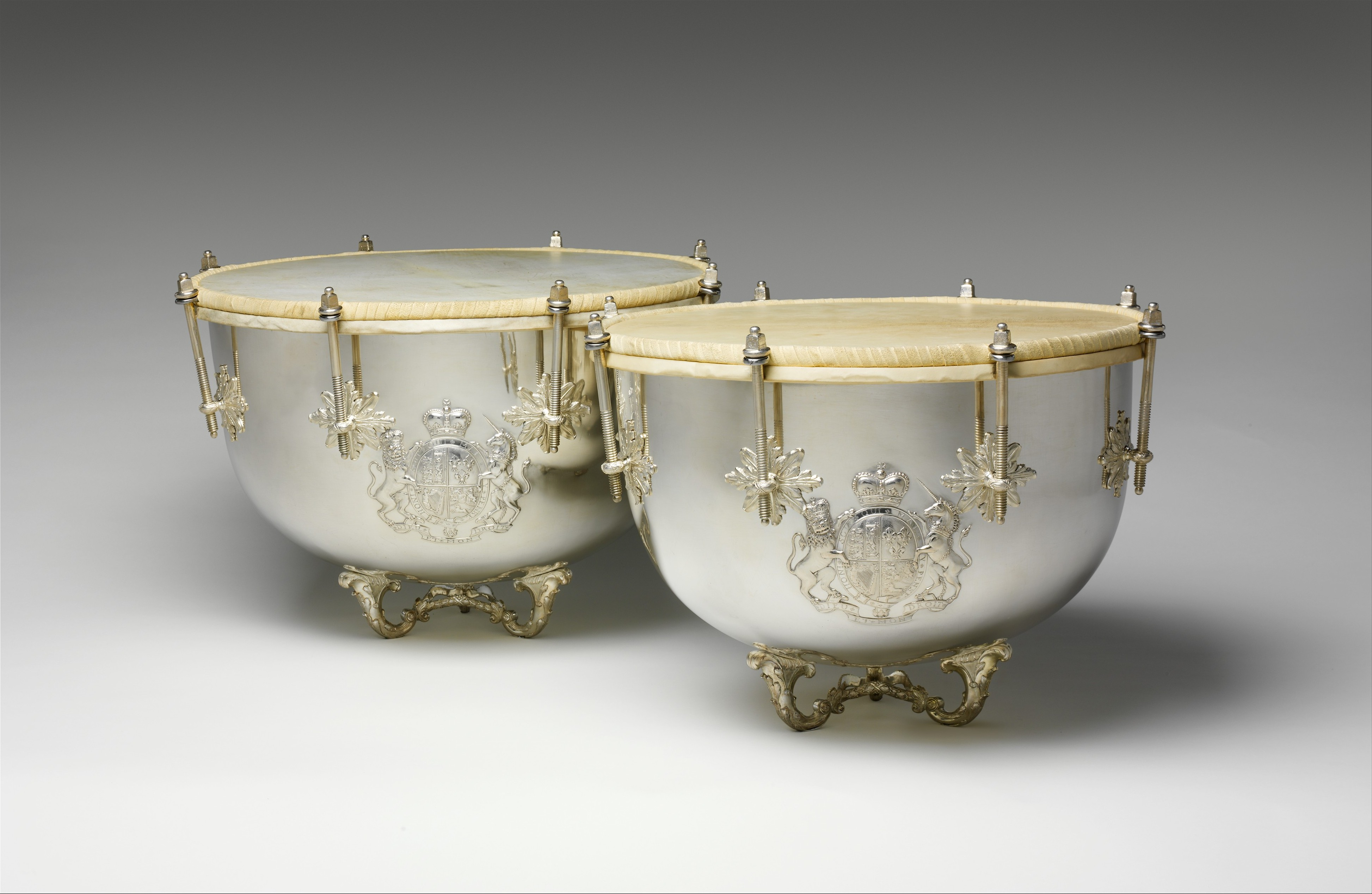
- Artist: Franz Peter Bunsen
- Year: 1779
- Medium: Silver, iron, calfskin, textiles, gold
- Location: Metropolitan Museum of Art, New York

The Metropolitan Museum of Art holds a pair of late 18th century kettle drums in its collection. Cast from iron and adorned with gilding and silver, the drums were made for the household guard of George III.

== Description ==
The drums were made by Hanoverian silversmith Franz Peter Bunsen (also known as Peter Franz Bunsen). The pair was made for the life guards (an elite military contingent that guarded the King's person) of King George III of Great Britain, who was the Prince-elector of the dominion of Hanover within the greater Holy Roman Empire. The ceremonial drums were intend to be used on horseback to announce the king's presence and to coordinate the guard at events of state. While they were seen as symbols of wealth and power in the 18th century, many such drums were eventually melted down for their silver.

The drum's body (referred to as its kettle) is cast from silver. The drum's struts, hoop, tuning bolts, and feet are made from gilded iron and silver. The head of the drum is made from calfskin. Bunsen included a raised section on both drums in the form of George III's coat of arms.
