= Ransingha =

Indian trumpet

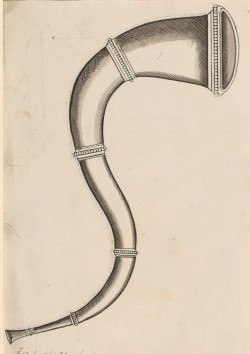
Ransingha horn assembled in the C shape. Can also be fitted into S shape.

The ransingha or ransinga is a type of primitive trumpet made of copper or copper alloys, used in both India and Nepal. The instrument is made of two metal curves, joined to form an "S" shape. It may also be reassembled to form a crescent.

It is part of a group of curved-tube instruments that include the ransingha, the narsinga and the sringa. It may also be related to the laawaa and Tibetan dungchen, both straight tubular copper horns.

== Alternate names ==
The instrument's name has been variously spelled narsinga, ransingha, ramsinga, and srnga.

Srnga is Sanskrit for horn and used in North India and Nepal. Its modern forms include "Sig", "Siga,", and "Singha". The term was historically used for a wide variety shapes and sizes of horns, including straight horns, and horns made from water buffalo horns with mouthpieces made from ox horns.

=== Ramsingha ===
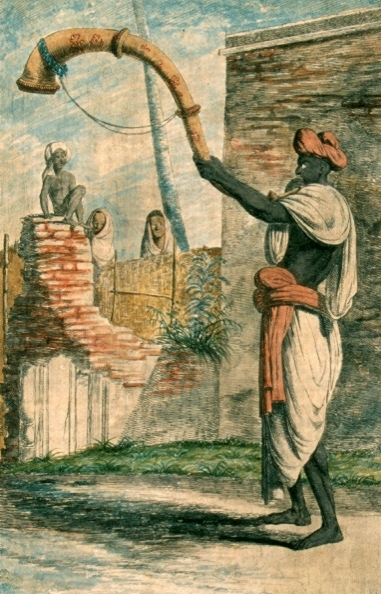
India, 1799. The Ramsinga, as depicted in the book Les Hindoûs (Volume II), by the Flemish artist Frans Balthazar Solvyns.

The ramsinga is a pronunciation specific to India. It uses four pipes of very thin metal which fit one within the other. It is mentioned in Emilio Salgari's works such as The Mystery of the Black Jungle (1895), where it is associated with the thugee cult.

In Chapter 62 of Foucault's Pendulum (1988) the Ramsinga is also mentioned, being played by a devotee of a druidic sect.

=== Narsinga ===
Played historically in C shape in Nepal by Damai caste musicians in groups such as the damai baja. This form used in Nepal, Himachal Pradesh and southern Bihar. The Narasingha horn is also played by the Gawantaris (musicians) of the Udasi sect of Sikhism to inform the public about religious processions.

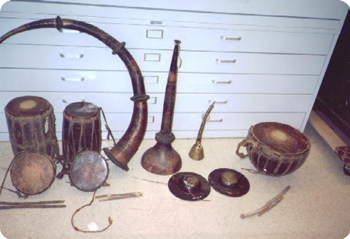
Nepal. The C-shaped narsinga is part of the Panche baja instruments.

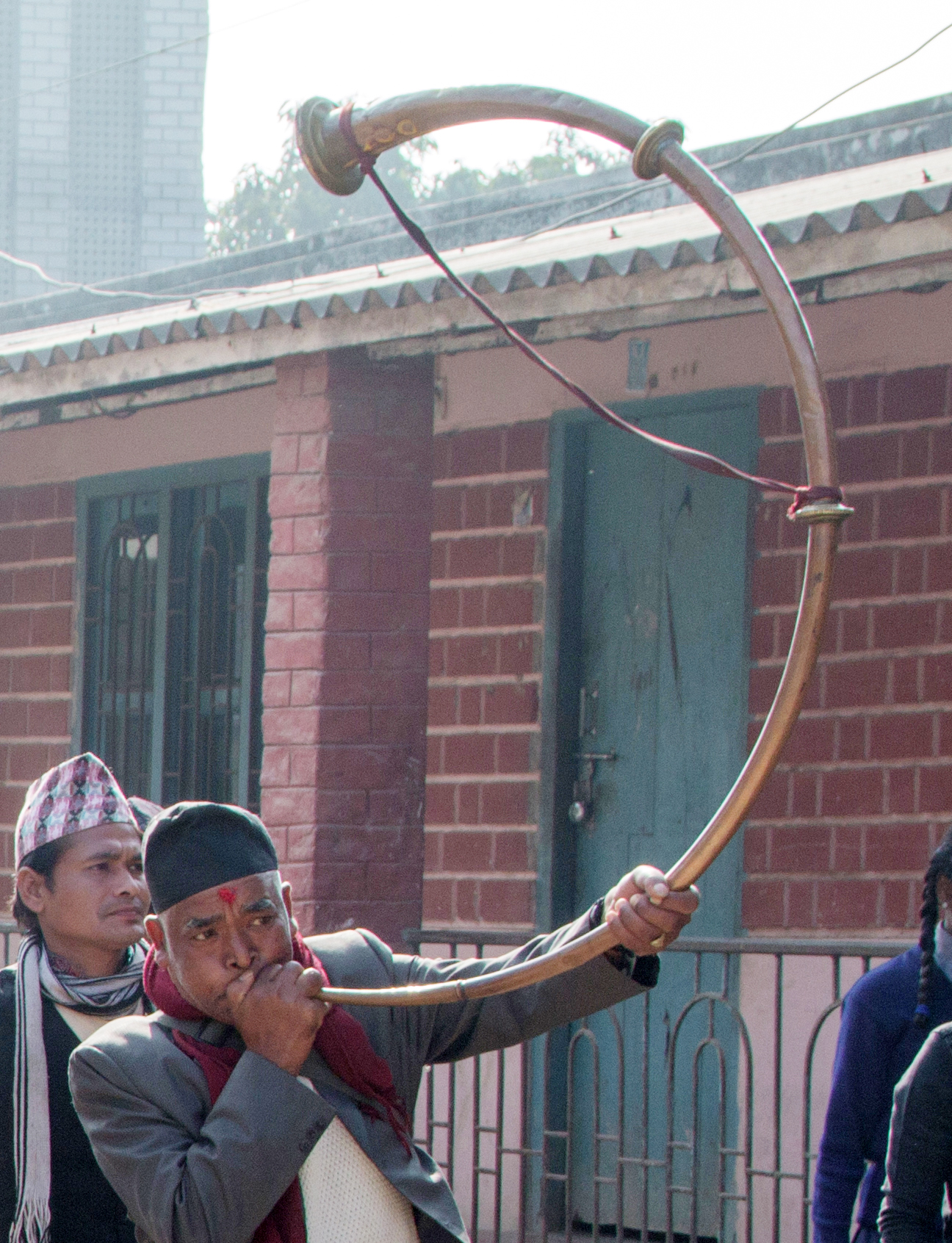
Nepal. Narsinga being played for a wedding.

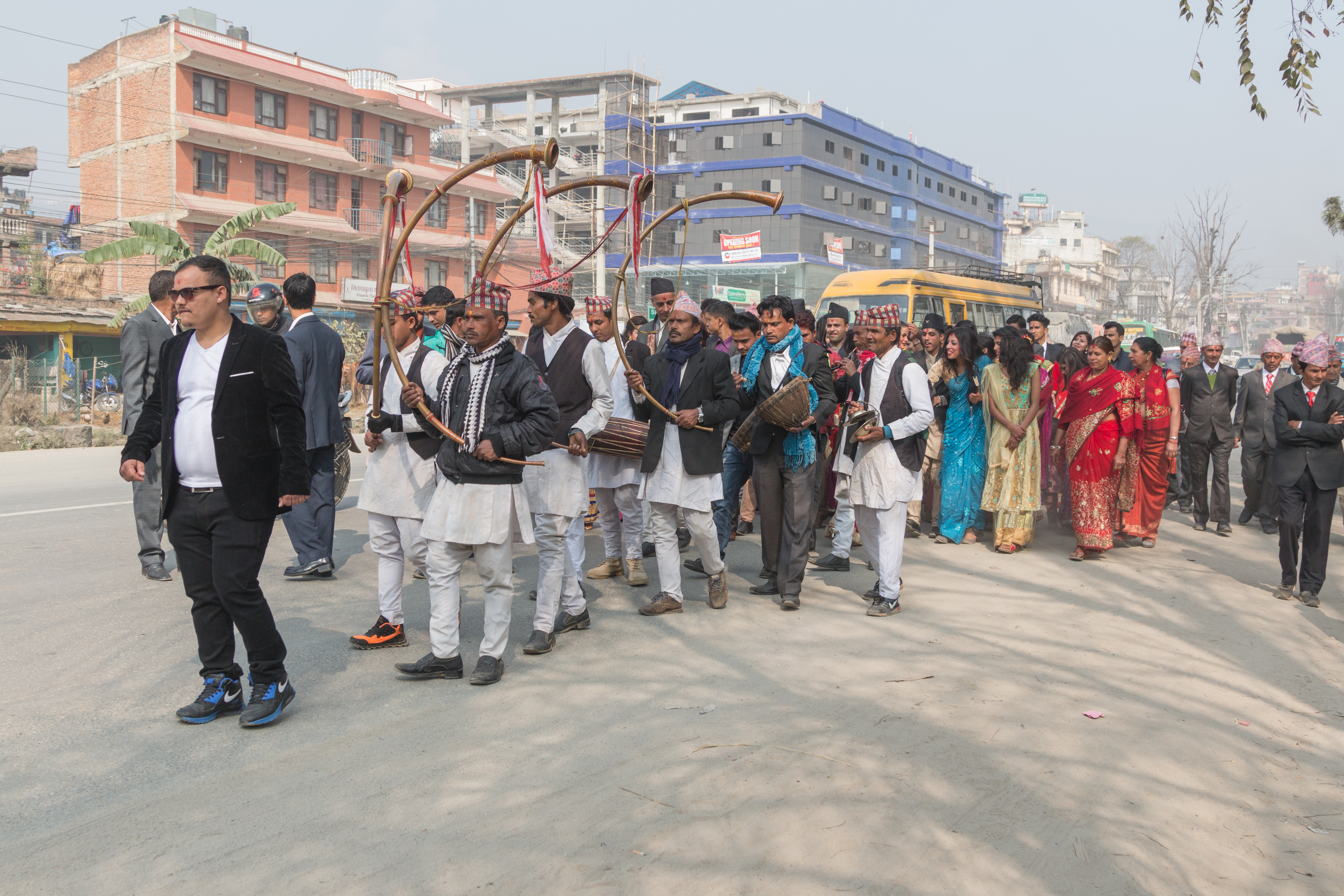
Nepal. Narsingas at a wedding party.

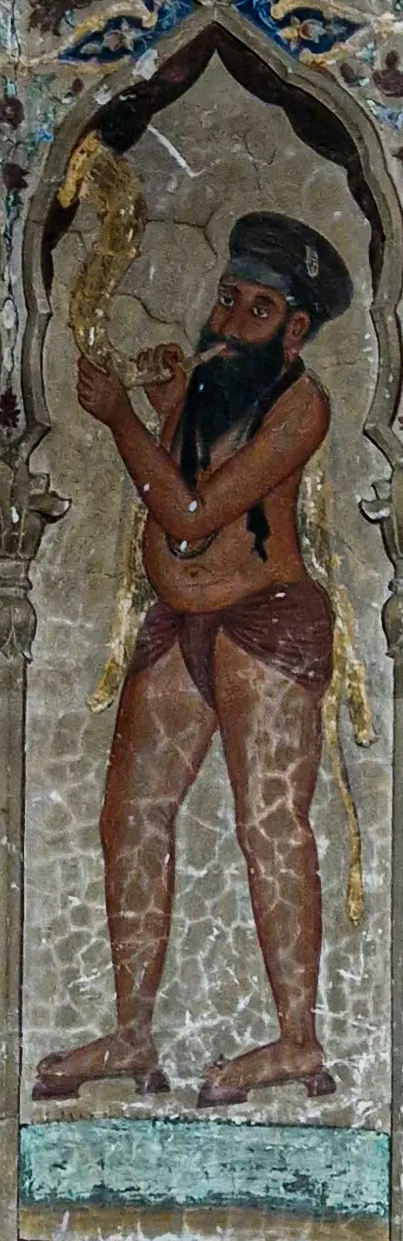
Fresco from Thakurdwara Dariana Mal in Amritsar depicting an Udasi playing the Narasingha

== See also ==
- Karnal, a long strait trumpet
- Sringa
