= Panche baja =

Set of Nepali musical instruments

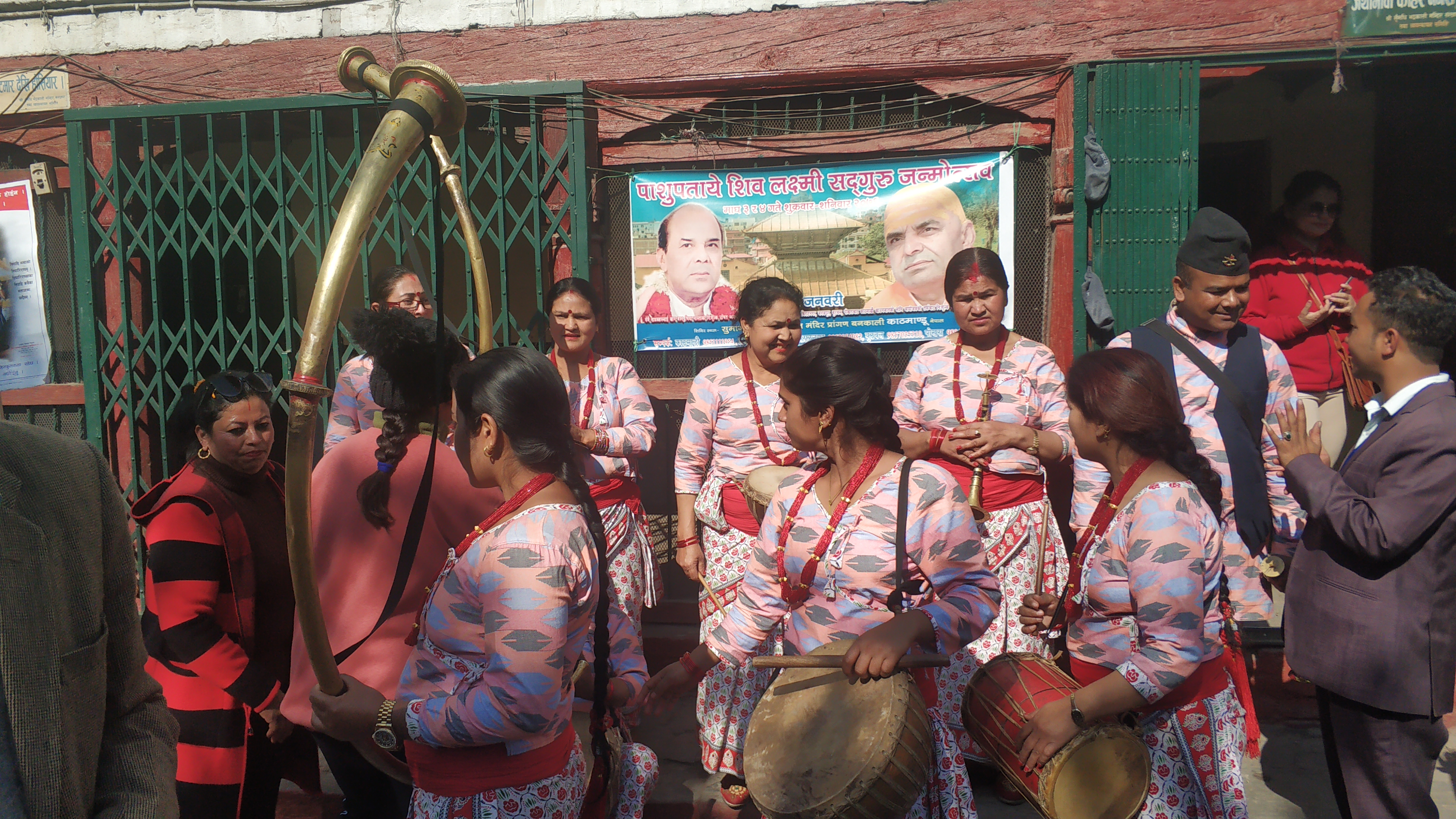
Nepali women playing panche baja

The panche baja (Nepali: पञ्चे बाजा, lit. 'five musical instruments') is a set of five traditional Nepali musical instruments that are played during holy ceremonies, especially marriages. Panche bajas are usually played by the Khas Damai and the Gaine castes in the Hindu tradition. They are played using the rhythm of folk Nepali songs.

It is referred to as panchje baja because in Nepali, panch means five (referring to the five different types), and baja means musical instruments.

The first part of the term is also transliterated panche, panchai, or pancai; the latter also as baaja.

== Components ==
The panche baja includes the shehnai or (Sanai/Sahanai),, Tyamko, dholaki (drums), damaha or Nagara (large kettledrum), narsinga (a long, C-shaped trumpet), jhyali or Jhurma/Jhymta (cymbals), and karnal (a wide-mouthed, straight trumpet with a bell that resembles the datura flower).

Other renderings give the ensemble as: shehnai, jhyali, dholki, tyamko, and damaha.

== Gallery ==
Panche Baja ensemble performing during a wedding ceremony in Nepal.

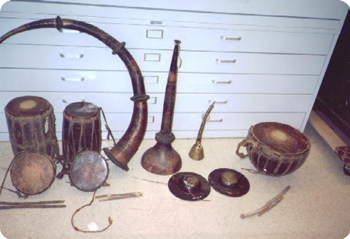
A set of panche baja commonly used in the hilly region of Nepal

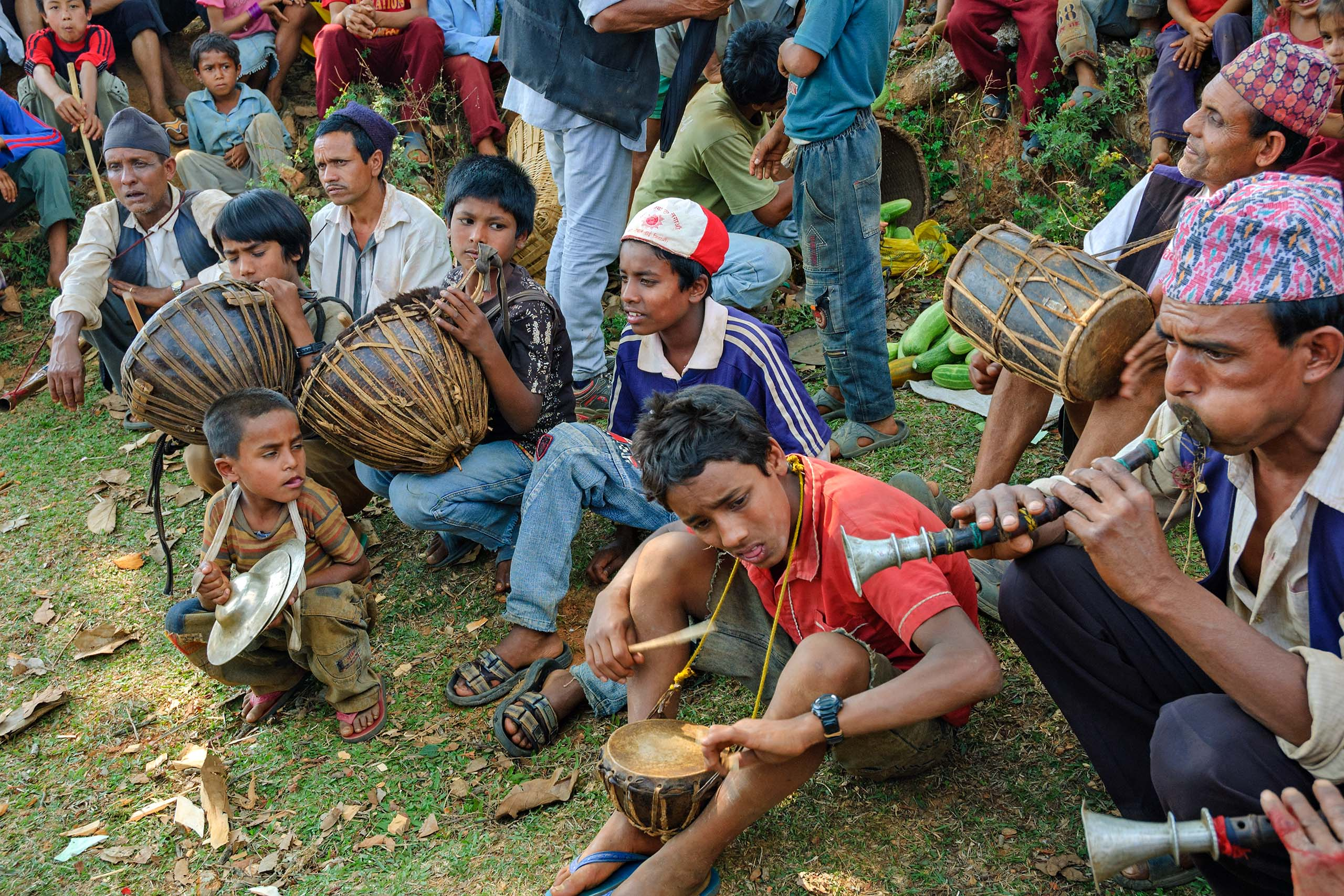
Panche baja playing sahane woodwind, tyamko dholaki damaha drums, jhyali cymbals, Dhading, Nepal

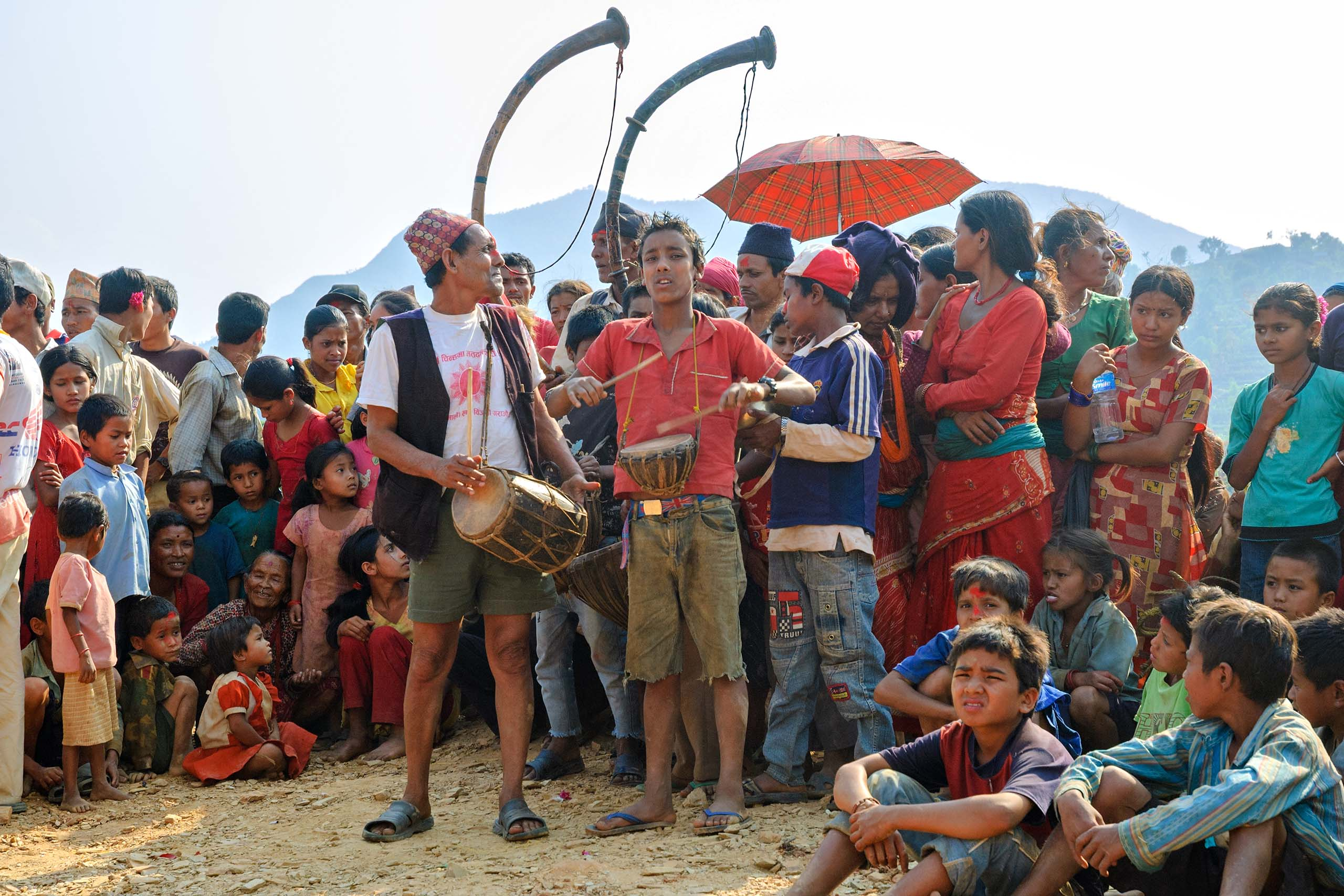
Panche baja playing tyamko and damaha drums and narsinga trumpets, Dhading, Nepal

Panche Baja ensemble performing during a wedding ceremony in Nepal.

== See also ==
- Music of Nepal
