= Stow, Ohio =

- City
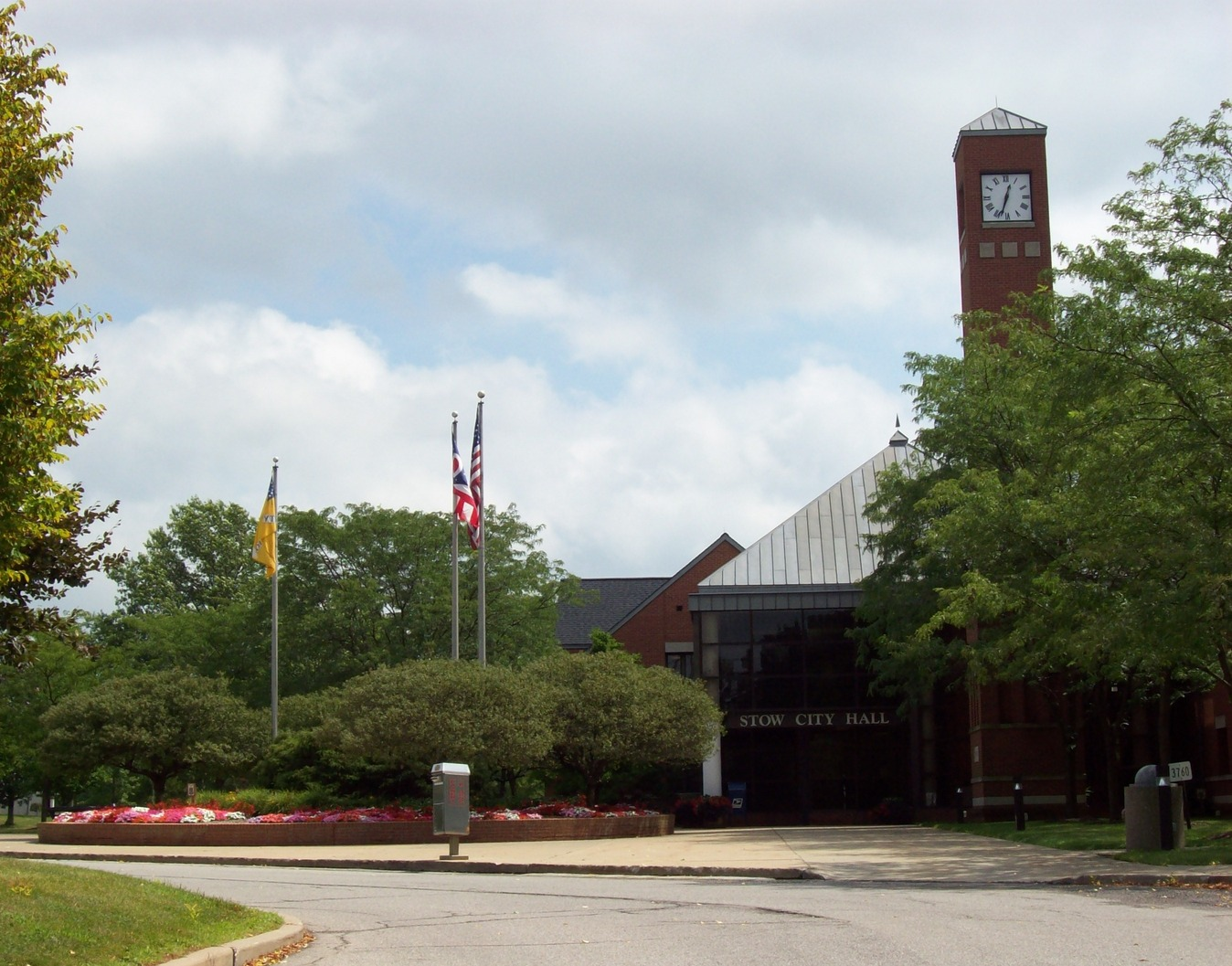
- Stow City Hall

- Flag Seal
- Interactive map of Stow, Ohio
- Location within Ohio Location within the United States
- Coordinates: 41°10′35″N 81°26′04″W
- Country: United States
- State: Ohio
- County: Summit
- Founded: 1804
- Incorporated: 1957
- Founder: Joshua Stow

Area
  - Total: 17.31 sq mi (44.84 km^{2})
  - Land: 17.09 sq mi (44.25 km^{2})
  - Water: 0.23 sq mi (0.59 km^{2})
- Elevation: 1,142 ft (348 m)

Population (2020)
  - Total: 34,483
  - Density: 2,018.2/sq mi (779.25/km^{2})
- Time zone: UTC-5 (EST)
  - Summer (DST): UTC-4 (EDT)
- ZIP code: 44224
- Area codes: 330, 234
- FIPS code: 39-74944
- GNIS feature ID: 1087018
- Website: www.stowohio.gov

Stow is a city in Summit County, Ohio, United States. The population was 34,483 at the 2020 census. It is a suburban community within the Akron metropolitan area.

== History ==
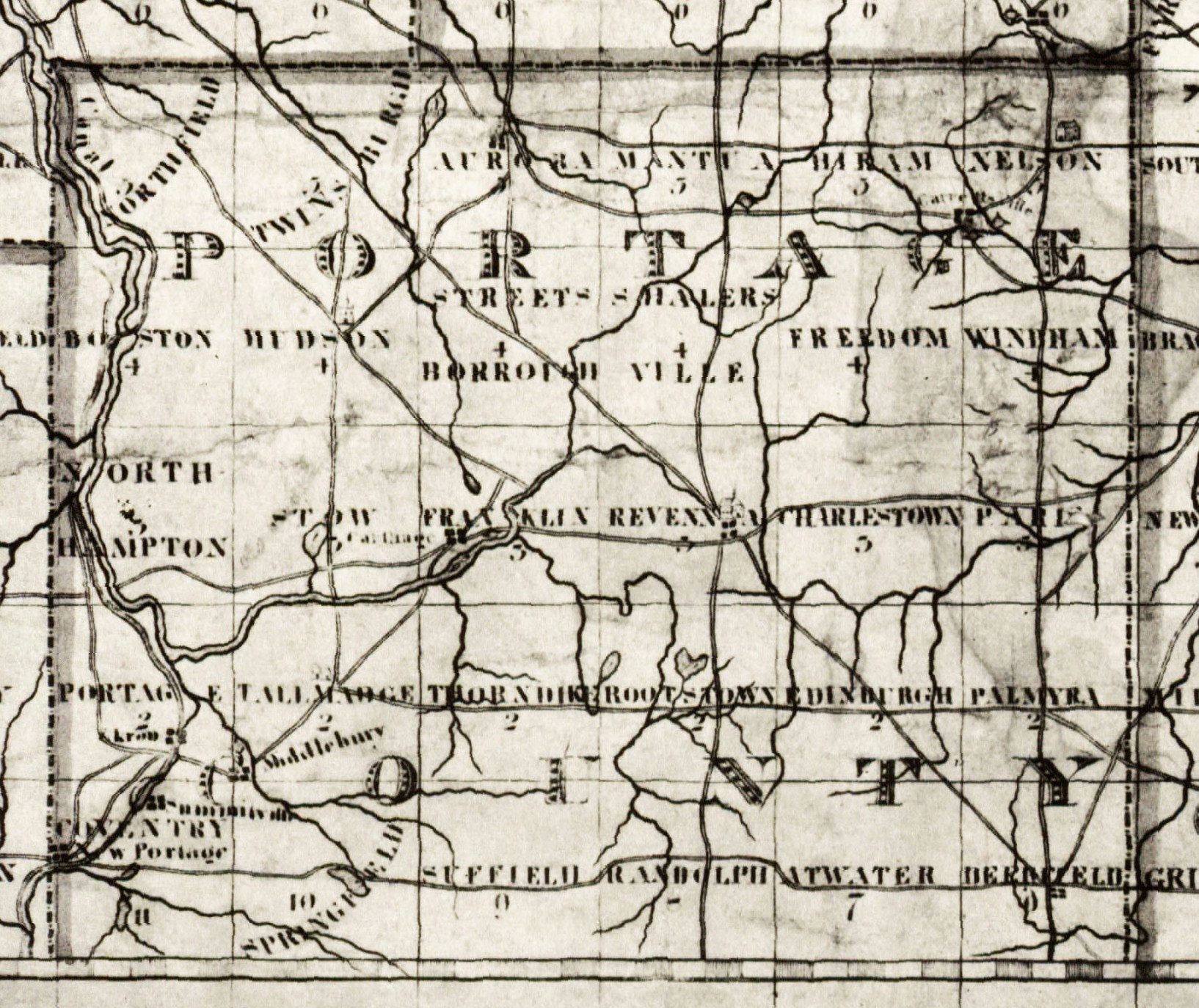
1826 map of Portage County showing Stow Township (left of center) as it was originally laid out

Stow is named for Joshua Stow, its original proprietor. Joshua Stow was a member of the party led by Moses Cleaveland to survey the lands of the Connecticut Western Reserve around present-day Cleveland in 1796. He was a native of Middletown, Connecticut, however, and never lived in Stow, though he spent both time and money developing the township and is quoted as saying it was "one of the prettiest and most romantic spots in the Western Reserve." The land that would eventually be known as Stow Township was the survey township "Town 3, Range 10" of the Western Reserve and was initially 25 square miles (65 km^{2}). It was purchased by Joshua Stow for $14,154. Prior to the arrival of European settlers, the area around what is now Stow was inhabited by a tribe of Seneca Native Americans at a small settlement in the area that is now part of the neighboring village of Silver Lake.

The first settler in Stow Township was William Walker, who arrived in 1802. Walker built a cabin just south of the land of his father Robert in Hudson Township mistakenly believing he was building in Hudson. In 1804, when Stow Township was separated from Hudson Township and surveyed into lots by Joseph Darrow, it was discovered his house was actually in Stow Township. Walker purchased the lot his home was on and continued to live there. Darrow had been hired by Joshua Stow's land agent William Wetmore, a settler also from Middletown, Connecticut, who moved to Stow in 1804 with his family and several other settlers. The Wetmores built a cabin in July 1804 near the center of Stow Township and the present-day intersection of Darrow Road and Kent Road. In 1808, the Wetmores built a home near the Seneca settlement in what is now Silver Lake. The house overlooked a small lake, known as Silver Lake since 1874, that was known earlier as Wetmore Pond or Stow Lake. Stow Township was formally organized in 1808 with the first election held in 1811. 1808 was also the year it was made part of the original Portage County. It remained as part of Portage County until it was included in the new Summit County in 1840.

Most of the original 25-square-mile (65 km^{2}) township is part of the present city of Stow, but parts of the original township form all or part of three neighboring communities. Munroe Falls was settled in 1809 as "Kelsey Mills" in the southern part of Stow Township and incorporated as a village in 1838. Cuyahoga Falls was developed on land owned by Wetmore and Joshua Stow beginning in 1825 in the southwestern part of the township and became a town in 1837. In 1851, Cuyahoga Falls Township was created, taking the southwest corner of Stow Township along with parts of three neighboring townships. Cuyahoga Falls incorporated as a village in 1868 and later annexed additional portions of Stow Township in the 19th and 20th centuries, as did Munroe Falls. Silver Lake incorporated as a village in 1918 on land that had previously been part of Stow Township. The remainder of Stow Township incorporated in 1957 as a village and became a city following the 1960 United States Census.

== Geography and climate ==
Stow is a suburb of Akron and is in east-central Summit County on the border with Portage County. It directly borders Kent to the east, Tallmadge and Munroe Falls to the south, Hudson to the north, and Cuyahoga Falls to the west and south. On the northwest corner, it touches Boston Township, with Streetsboro on the northeast corner and Brimfield Township on the southeast. According to the United States Census Bureau, the city has a total area of 17.32 square miles (44.86 km^{2}), of which 17.09 square miles (44.26 km^{2}) is land and 0.23 square miles (0.60 km^{2}) is water.

Stow's climate is classified as a humid continental climate in the Dfa Köppen climate classification meaning it typically has very warm, humid summers and cold, snowy winters, with moderate and variable spring and autumn seasons. The city is not considered part of the Lake Erie snowbelt, though lake-effect snow does occur at times. Stow is in the "secondary snowbelt," meaning it will receive heavier snowfalls from lake-effect snow when certain wind directions are more prevalent, but typically sees far less snow than areas to the north closer to Lake Erie.

== Demographics ==
Historical population
Census	Pop.	Note	%±
1960	12,194		—
1970	19,847		62.8%
1980	25,299		27.5%
1990	27,702		9.5%
2000	32,139		16.0%
2010	34,837		8.4%
2020	34,483		−1.0%
2025 (est.)	33,941		−1.6%
U.S. Decennial Census

=== 2020 census ===
As of the 2020 census, Stow had a population of 34,483 and a median age of 41.6 years. 20.0% of residents were under the age of 18 and 19.7% were 65 years of age or older. For every 100 females there were 94.0 males, and for every 100 females age 18 and over there were 91.9 males age 18 and over.

100.0% of residents lived in urban areas, while 0.0% lived in rural areas.

There were 14,608 households in Stow, of which 26.6% had children under the age of 18 living in them. Of all households, 50.3% were married-couple households, 17.3% were households with a male householder and no spouse or partner present, and 25.8% were households with a female householder and no spouse or partner present. About 30.1% of all households were made up of individuals and 12.3% had someone living alone who was 65 years of age or older.

There were 15,372 housing units, of which 5.0% were vacant. The homeowner vacancy rate was 0.9% and the rental vacancy rate was 7.2%.

Racial composition as of the 2020 census
Race	Number	Percent
White	30,166	87.5%
Black or African American	1,246	3.6%
American Indian and Alaska Native	26	0.1%
Asian	1,052	3.1%
Native Hawaiian and Other Pacific Islander	4	0.0%
Some other race	193	0.6%
Two or more races	1,796	5.2%
Hispanic or Latino (of any race)	760	2.2%

=== Economic data ===
As of economic data accessed in 2013, those living under the poverty level in Stow has increased from 4.0% in 2007 to 7.5%. The employment status is 71% in the labor force, with an unemployment rate of 5.8%. There are 23.4% of the population receiving a mean Social Security income of $16,235 per year.

Of the city's population over age 25, 40.6% hold a bachelor's degree or higher.

=== 2010 census ===
As of the census of 2010, there were 34,837 people, 14,226 households, and 9,436 families residing in the city. The population density was 2,038.4 inhabitants per square mile (787.0/km^{2}). There were 15,141 housing units at an average density of 886.0 per square mile (342.1/km^{2}). The racial makeup of the city was 93.0% White, 2.7% African American, 0.1% Native American, 2.4% Asian, 0.3% from other races, and 1.4% from two or more races. Hispanic or Latino of any race were 1.5% of the population.

There were 14,226 households, of which 30.9% had children under age 18 living with them, 53.9% were married couples living together, 9.0% had a female householder with no husband present, 3.5% had a male householder with no wife present, and 33.7% were non-families. 27.2% of all households were made up of individuals, and 10.1% had someone living alone who was 65 or older. The average household size was 2.42, and the average family size was 2.97.

The median age in the city was 39.7 years. 22.7% of residents were under age 18; 8.1% were between 18 and 24; 26.8% were from 25 to 44; 28.6% were from 45 to 64; and 13.8% were 65 or older. The gender makeup of the city was 48.2% male and 51.8% female.

=== 2000 census ===
As of the census of 2000, there were 32,139 people, 12,317 households, and 8,745 families residing in the city. The population density was 1,878.1 inhabitants per square mile (725.1/km^{2}). There were 12,852 housing units at an average density of 751.0 per square mile (290.0/km^{2}). The racial makeup of the city was 95.20% White, 1.54% African American, 0.11% Native American, 1.91% Asian, 0.01% Pacific Islander, 0.30% from other races, and 0.93% from two or more races. Hispanic or Latino of any race were 0.91% of the population.

There were 12,317 households, out of which 35.3% had children under the age of 18 living with them, 59.8% were married couples living together, 8.4% had a female householder with no husband present, and 29.0% were non-families. 23.7% of all households were made up of individuals, and 8.0% had someone living alone who was 65 years of age or older. The average household size was 2.57 and the average family size was 3.08.

In the city the population was spread out, with 26.0% under the age of 18, 7.4% from 18 to 24, 31.1% from 25 to 44, 23.5% from 45 to 64, and 12.0% who were 65 years of age or older. The median age was 37 years. For every 100 females, there were 93.8 males. For every 100 females age 18 and over, there were 89.8 males.

== Parks and recreation ==
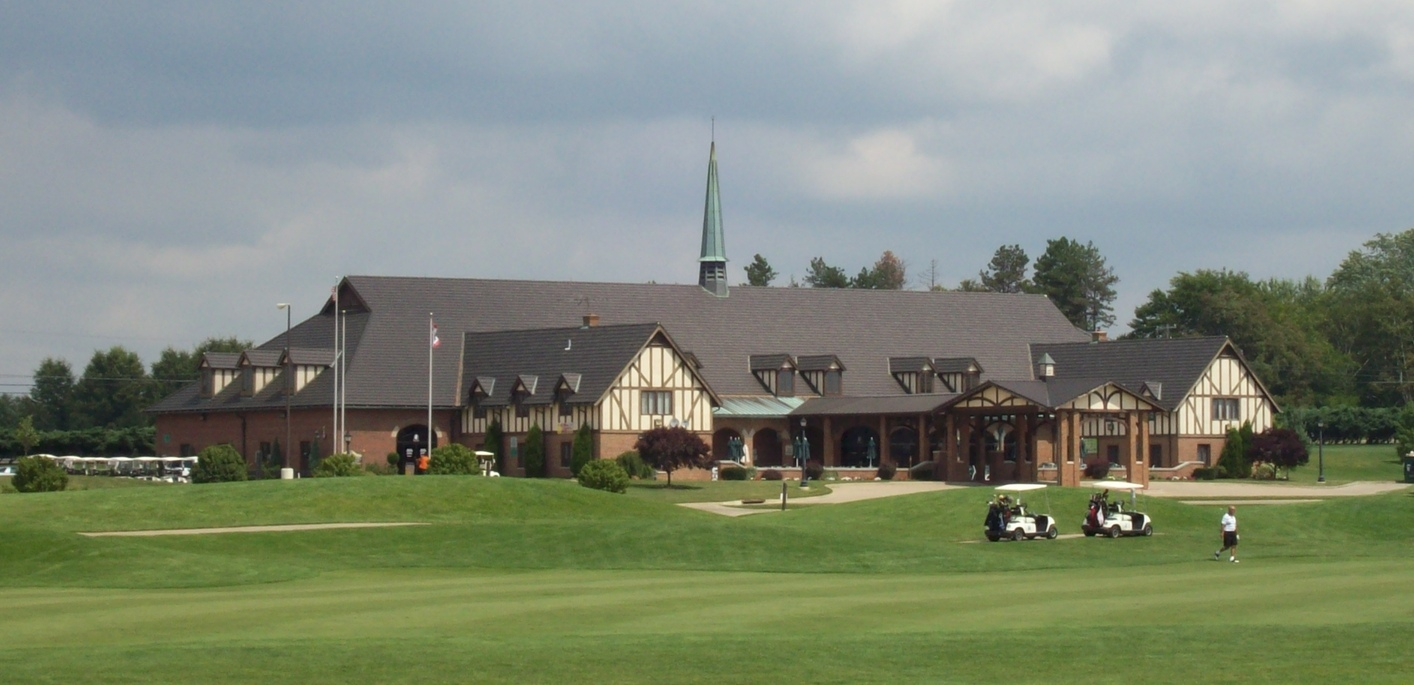
Roses Run Country Club

Stow has several community parks including Adell Durbin Park, Meadowbrook Lake Park, Silver Springs Park, and Oregon Trail Park. Stow also owns Fox Den Golf Course. Stow Parks and Recreation allows children and teenagers to participate in sports such as baseball and basketball. The tennis courts at Stow's parks are free to the public. The tennis courts at Adel Durbin Park are also lit for nighttime play.

Stow is also home to the Roses Run Country Club, which overlooks a section of the Cuyahoga River. In 2006 it was ranked the 18th most challenging 18-hole golf course in Northeast Ohio by the Northern Ohio Golf Association. Fox Den Golf Course is another 18 hole 71 par golf course located in the eastern part of Stow and is owned and operated by the city of Stow. In 2009 it was named as one of the top-ten golf courses in Northeast Ohio by the Akron Beacon Journal.

The 33.5-mile (53.9 km) Summit County MetroParks Bike and Hike trail runs through Stow beginning near the Pambi Farm Estates and Roses Run Country Club. The paved Bike & Hike Trail parallels a scenic section of the Cuyahoga River where great blue herons, Canada geese, ducks, turtles and white-tailed deer can be seen. The trail continues west through the neighboring cities of Munroe Falls and Silver Lake then continues north to Brandywine Falls, one of the highest waterfalls in Ohio. All 33.5 miles of the trail are paved and can be used for hiking, biking and rollerblading as well as cross-country skiing. Picnic areas can be found at numerous places along the trail.

The city also has a new entertainment and gathering area, with a amphitheater as the central icon. Named "The AMP," the city plans on using it as a new hub for entertainment, comparable to Silver Springs Park, which hosts city-wide festivities. It broke ground on April 12, 2026, and is set to be done by the end of 2026.

== Education ==
Stow is served by the Stow–Munroe Falls City School District, along with most of neighboring Munroe Falls. The district includes six elementary schools (Echo Hills, Fishcreek, Highland, Indian Trail, Riverview and Woodland), Lakeview Intermediate School, Kimpton Middle School and Stow-Munroe Falls High School. All of the district schools are in Stow except Riverview Elementary and Kimpton Middle School, which are in Munroe Falls. Stow is served by Holy Family School for those wishing a Grade 1–8 Catholic education.

== Media ==
Stow is served by a local newspaper — the Stow Sentry — published weekly by Record Publishing Co, however, it is now a part of the Akron Beacon Journal and is published online. Maintained by the area division of Time Warner Cable, Stow used to sponsors a Government-access television (GATV) station on cable TV — Stow Community Channel 15; however, it has been shifted towards access through social media on YouTube.

== Transportation ==
Three Ohio state routes run through Stow: Ohio State Route 8, a limited-access highway; Ohio State Route 59 (Kent Road); and Ohio State Route 91 (Darrow Road). Both the Akron Metropolitan Regional Transit Authority (METRO RTA) and Portage Area Regional Transportation Authority (PARTA) have bus lines that stop in Stow, and the city is also home to the Kent State University Airport.

== Notable people ==
- Haley Bennett - singer, songwriter and actress
- Richard Cooey - convicted murderer and rapist; executed in 2008
- Larry Csonka - former professional football player in the National Football League (NFL)
- Ben Curtis - professional golfer and winner of the 2003 British Open; lived in Stow for several years
- Ed Donatell - professional football player in the NFL
- Joe Ebanks - champion poker player
- Leona Farris - educator and volunteer
- Mark Gangloff - 2008 Olympian and gold medal winner
- Jim Graner - former weeknight sports anchor for WKYC; color commentator for Cleveland Browns radio network
- Erin Rachel Hudak - multi-media artist
- Dave Jamerson - professional basketball player in the National Basketball Association
- Neel Kashkari - Interim Assistant Secretary of the Treasury for Financial Stability
- Jillian Martin - professional bowler; youngest-ever to win a Professional Women's Bowling Association (PWBA) Tour event and youngest to win a "triple crown" of PWBA majors
- Shawn Porter - professional boxer
- Erick Purkhiser - better known as Lux Interior, lead singer of The Cramps
- Jennifer Rohn - scientist and novelist
- Rob Senderoff - college basketball coach
- Mike Vrabel - professional football player and head coach in the NFL
- David Walker - professional basketball player in Liga ACB
- George Younce - Gospel Music Hall of Fame member and founding member of The Cathedrals
