= Lytavry =

Type of Ukrainian bass drum

- Classification: Membranophone
- Hornbostel–Sachs classification: 211.11

Related instruments
- Timpani; Kettle drums; Tulumbasy

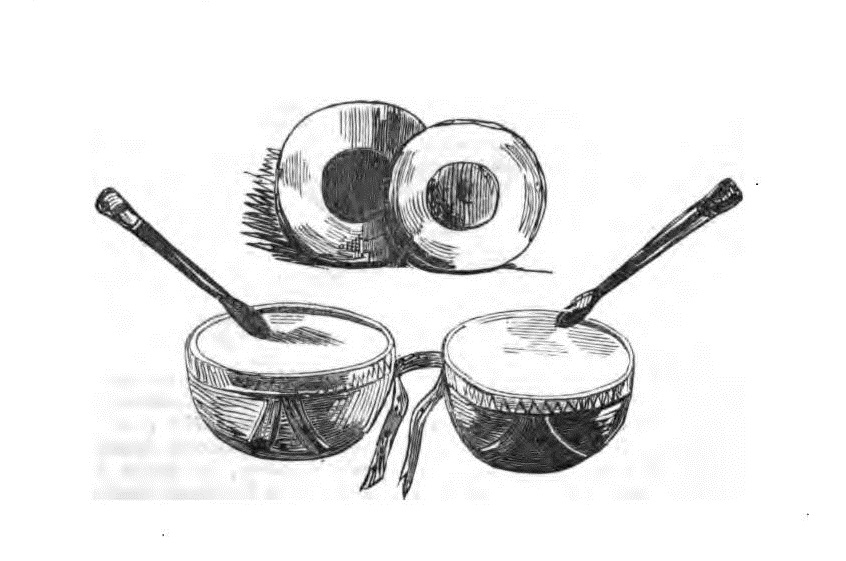
Depiction of lytavry used by Ukrainian Cossacks in the late 16th century

The lytavry (Ukrainian: Литаври) (also tulumbasy) are a bass drum similar to the kettle drums or timpani used in Ukraine. The lytavry were used in Ukraine from the times of the Cossacks, and probably earlier as a signaling device to announce meetings and enemy attacks. They are used in Ukrainian folk instrument orchestras.

Hornbostel-Sachs classification number 211.11

== See also ==
- Ukrainian folk music

== Sources ==
- Cherkaskyi, L. - Ukrainski narodni muzychni instrumenty // Tekhnika, Kyiv, Ukraine, 2003 - 262 pages. ISBN 966-575-111-5
