= Sringa =

Ancient Indian musical instrument

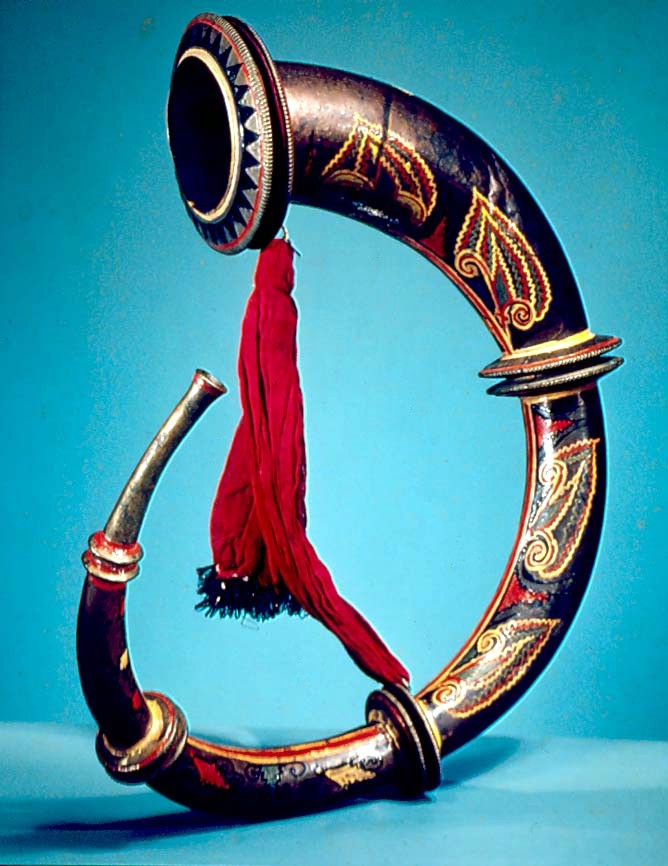
Ranasringa, India (c.1880)

The Sringa, also known as tutari, ranasringa, blowhorn, sig, singa, kurudutu, gaali-kommu or kombu, is an ancient Indian musical instrument. It is a type of horn wind instrument.

== Construction ==
There are two shape types of bugles, one made in "S" shape, and the other in "C" shape. Material was originally made of animal horn, and of metal.

== Playing ==
The tutari in Maharashtra, has survived not just because of its connections to royal traditions, but as a current political symbol. The instrument is also executed in South India, in Sri Lanka, and Nepal. It is played for festivals, and in ritual performances known as kshetram vadyam. It is also played for marriages and in military music.

== See also ==
- Kombu (instrument)
- Ransingha. A similar instrument sharing common origin. C-shaped or S-shaped.

== Sources ==
- S. Sadie, The New Grove Dictionary of Musical Instruments, Macmillan Publishers, London, 1985.
