= Karnay =

Long trumpet used in Uzbekistan, Iran, and Tajikistan

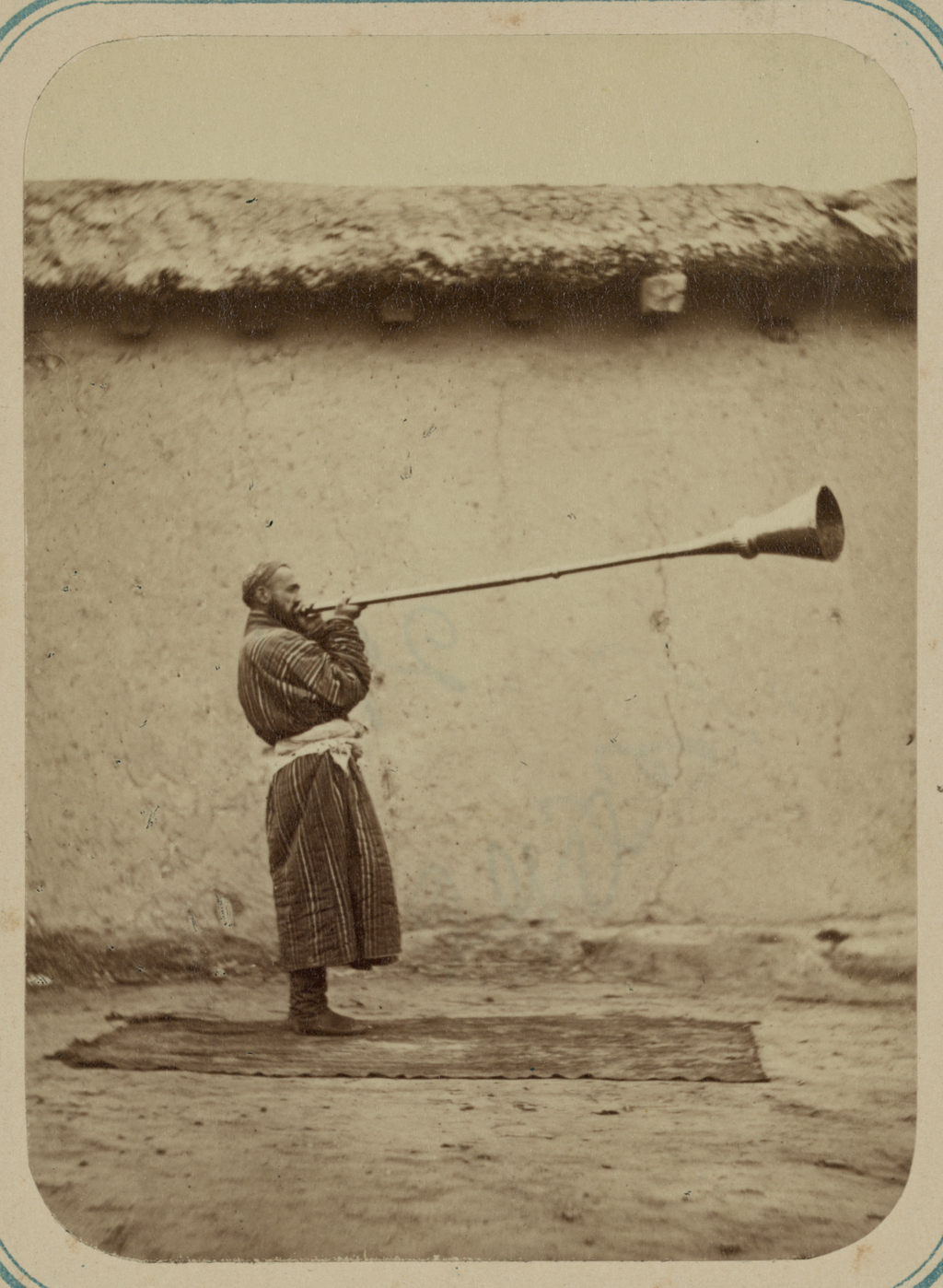
- A man in Russian Turkestan plays the karnay.

Brass instrument
- Classification: brass
- Hornbostel–Sachs classification: 423.121 (Natural trumpets – There are no means of changing the pitch apart from the player's lips; end-blown trumpets – The mouth-hole faces the axis of the trumpet.)

Related instruments
- Alphorn; karnal; Nafir; Tibetan horn

The karnay (Note: Azerbaijani: kərənay; Kazakh: керней, romanized: kernei; Kyrgyz: керней, romanized: kerney; Persian: کرنای, romanized: karranāy, karnāy; کرنا, karranā, karnā; قرنا, qarnā; Russian: карнай, romanized: karnay; Tajik: карнай, romanized: karnay; Turkish: kürenay; Uyghur: كاناي, romanized: kanay; Uzbek: karnay) or kerana is a metal natural trumpet. The name is first mentioned in the biblical book of Daniel, used in the Middle Ages to the Persian military bands and in the Indian Mughal Empire to the representative orchestra naqqāra-khāna and which is still used by this name in ceremonial music in Central Asia and northern India.

Since the middle of the 3rd millennium B.C., trumpets known in both Mesopotamia and Ancient Egypt were used in both regions as signaling instruments in ceremonies, warfare and work assignments. They could only produce one or two notes, but could send messages using patterns of rhythm. Karnā derives from Aramaic qarnāʾ, Hebrew qeren and Akkadian qarnu. In addition to the Arabic word būq for brass instruments in general (horns and trumpets), in medieval Arabic texts nafīr predominantly referred to a slender, cylindrical, shrill-sounding metal trumpet, būq a slightly shorter, conical trumpet and karnā a conical, sometimes S-shaped trumpet up to two meters long. The trumpet types nafīr and karnā were used in Iran, together with various drums and other percussion instruments, in the naqqāra-khāna until the early 20th century. Today the karnā in Uzbekistan and Tajikistan is a long, mostly cylindrical metal trumpet, and in northern India it is a straight, tapered metal trumpet that can be long and thin or short and wide.

It is used in the music of Iran, Tajikistan, and Uzbekistan, where it is considered a national instrument.

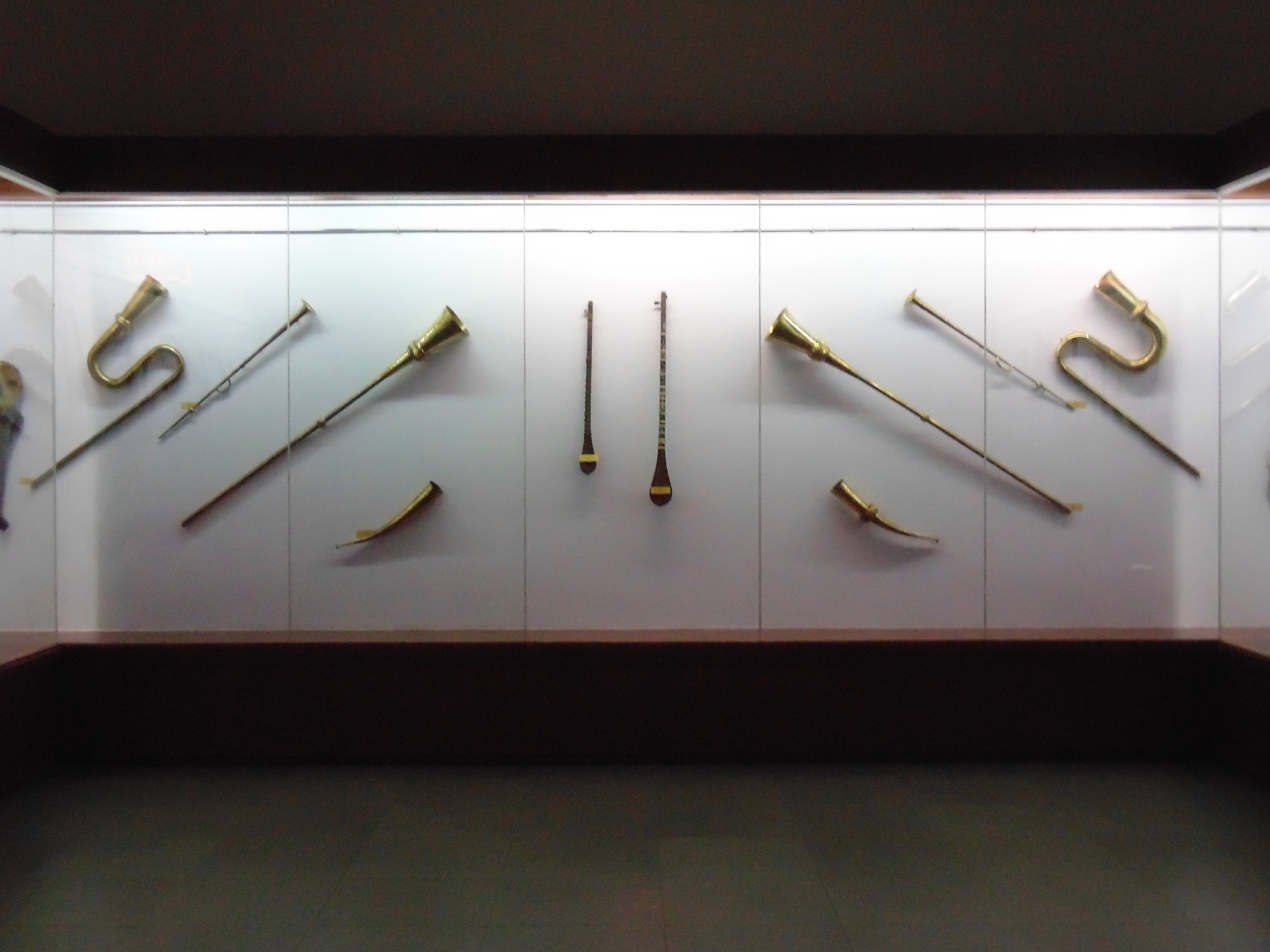
Varieties of karnay trumpets from Tajikistan. The largest trumpets are karnay. The middle size trumpet is the nafir. The trumpet with an s-curve may have been called surna in India; however surna, sorna, and zurna are all names for reed instruments of the oboe family, so caution must be used calling a trumpet surna.

== Karnay ==
The kernei is a Kyrgyz wind musical instrument, which as well as the surnai (Persian: سرنای) was not modernised for ensembles or orchestras and exists in traditional form. It is used particularly for signaling or as a ceremonial instrument with a powerful sound and piercing timbre. There are two kinds of kernei: the muiuz kernei (made from a mountain goat horn), and the jez kernei (made of copper or brass). Both of them are very different instruments, but they are combined by lack of playing apertures.

== Muiuz kernei ==
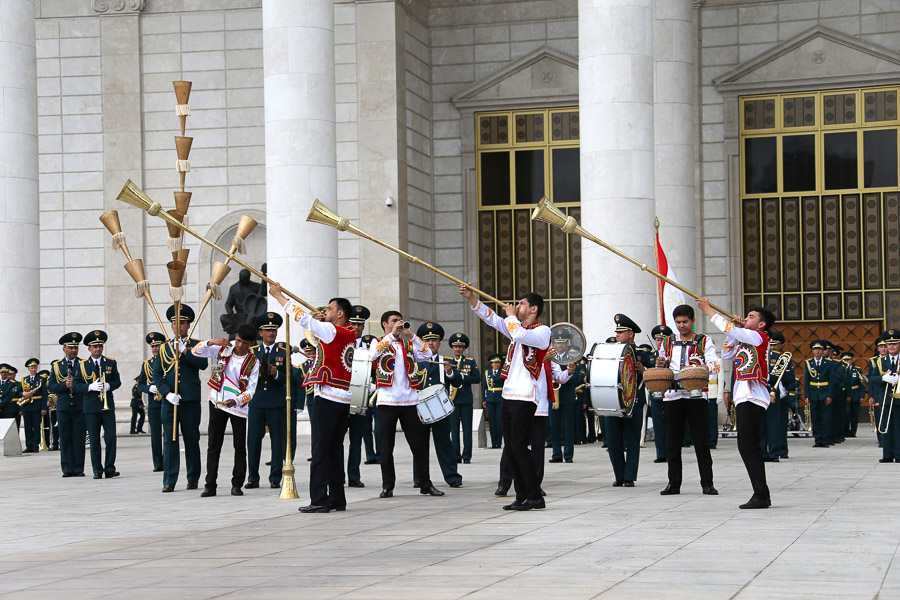
Members of a Tajik Military Brass Band playing Karnays.

The muiuz kernei is an ancient instrument made from a curved mountain goat horn, ranging in length between 30 and 40 cm. The instrument does not have a mouthpiece and gives only a few sounds of thick, soft timbre. The Military Brass Band of the Commandant Regiment of the Ministry of Defense of Tajikistan (the only military band in the world to use karnays) uses the Muiuz kernei.

== Jez kernei ==
The jez kernei is 1–2 m long longitudinal trumpet with/without a mouthpiece. Faucet diameter is 20 cm. The similarity between the jez kernei and the Uzbek and Uighur karnai is accounted by the territorial nearness of South Kyrgyzstan and Uzbekistan. The sound of Kernei is very strong, loud and intended for outdoor areas. Some time in the past the kernei's applied function was restricted by notification of important events, but today it is typically used for national holidays.

The separate group of Kyrgyz aerophones represent the instruments, which considerably yield the main kinds of folk wind instruments by quality of timbre and artistic importance. They can be called as noise instruments. They were not produced by people, they exist in the nature and produce neither musical nor artistic sounds. They include the chymyldak—produce squeak, yshkyryk—whistle, baryldak—under tongue aerophone, chynyrtky—hunter's quail call, jalbyrak—"explosive" aerophone.

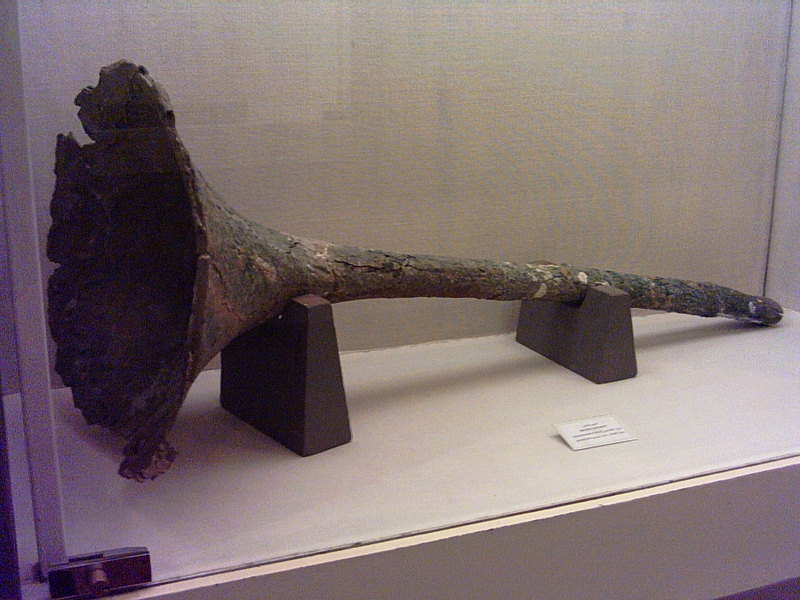
Karna, one of the ancient Persian musical instruments, 6th century BC, Persepolis Museum.

Musicians playing the karnay at the opening of the international film festival Didor in Dushanbe, Tajikistan on 12 October 2010.

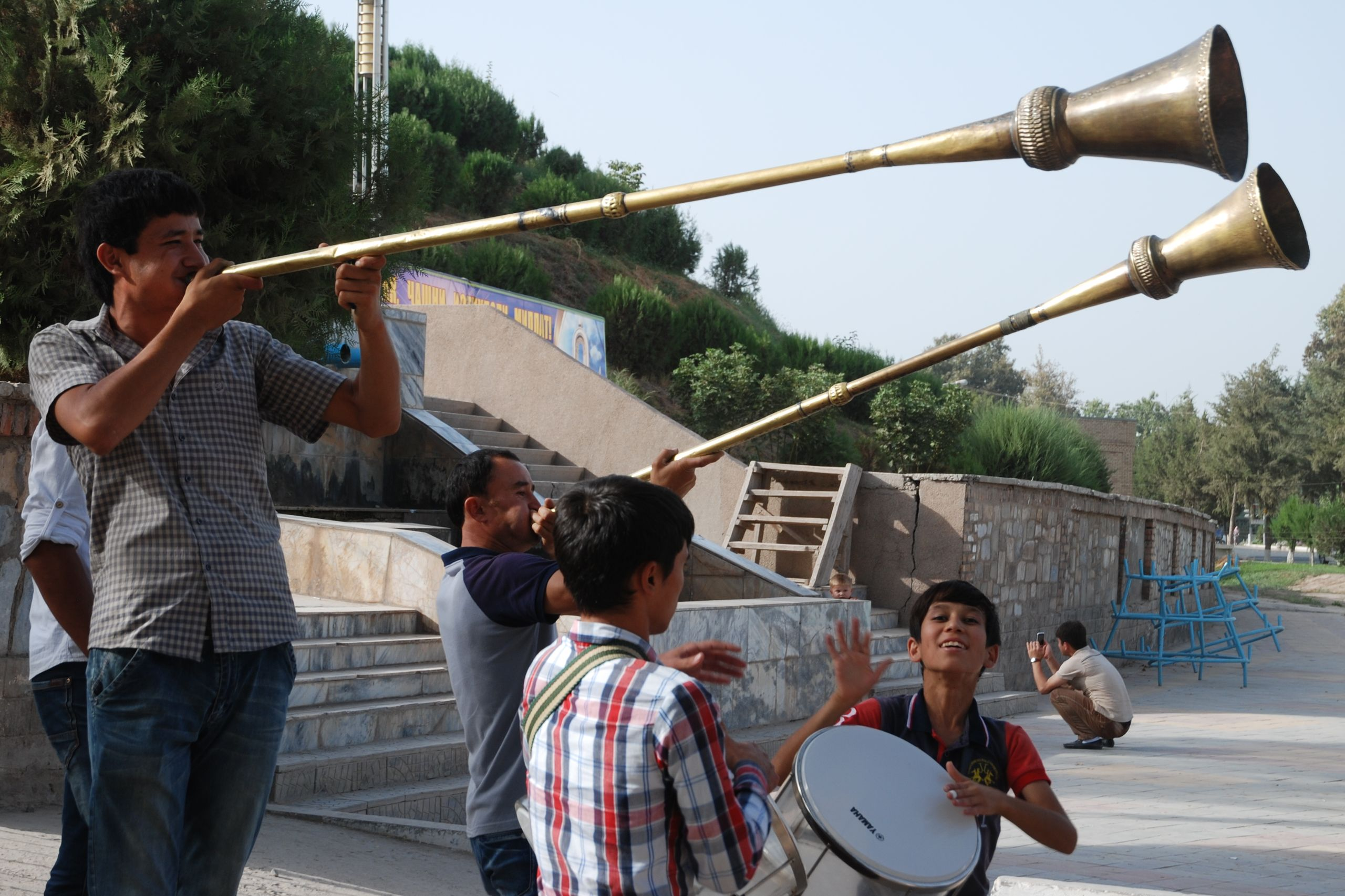
Tajikistan, karnas sounded for celebration of marriage.
