= Leona Farris =

American educator (1917–2022)

- Born: August 11, 1917
- Died: February 27, 2022 (aged 104)
- Children: 4

Academic background
- Education: Ohio State University (B.S.); Kent State University (M.S.)

Academic work
- Discipline: Home economics
- Institutions: University of Akron

Leona Wright Farris (August 11, 1917 – February 27, 2022) was an American educator. She worked as an assistant professor at the University of Akron from 1969 to 1988 and some sources list her as the first African American woman to hold that position at the university. Her family was one of the first black families to live in Stow, Ohio, and her children were the first black children to attend the school district there. Farris was involved in integrating the dormitories of Ohio State University and continued to be active in groups such as the NAACP and Alpha Kappa Alpha throughout her life. The University of Akron has a scholarship in her name.

== Biography ==
Farris was born on August 11, 1917, and grew up in poverty. Her father died when she was four and one of her sisters died at age 9. Farris' mother helped provide for her daughter's education as long as Farris would take care of her sister who had schizophrenia. Farris's mother was a lifelong volunteer, inspiring her daughter to do the same. Farris earned her bachelor's degree from Ohio State University (OSU) in 1940. At OSU, she was part of the integration of the school dormitories in 1939. Farris married her husband, physician Melvin Farris, around 1943.

Farris moved to Stow, Ohio, in 1954. This was their second attempt at buying a house in the city. The first time, was in 1948, when because they were black, the price was raised by $3,000 on the spot and "two other parties were interested in the house" by the time they arrived to look at the house. The second time, in 1954, three doctors got together to build homes on Fishcreek Road, using a white contractor to purchase the land. They were the third black family to move in and the first to have children in Stow. In the community, she volunteered while she was staying at home, raising her four children. Farris also raised a foster child. Her children were the only African American kids in the school district. Farris was very careful helping her children integrate into the neighborhood and helped create lifelong friendships in the process. As a volunteer at the time, Farris was involved with her husband's work in the Summit County Medical Auxiliary. She also volunteered for the PTA. In the 1960s, she helped stop the local Girl Scout group's use of minstrel shows for fund-raising activities.

Farris decided to create a new career for herself in the late 1950s. While still working on her graduate degree at Kent State University, she was hired as an assistant professor at the University of Akron in 1969 to teach home economics. She was the first African American woman to work as an assistant professor there. She graduated from Kent State in 1970. Her teaching methods included working on a film created with students and also encouraging her students to design games based on their studies. She also directed consumer workshops at the university. Farris retired from Akron University in May 1988.

Farris was involved in the community and also in national groups. She helped raise money for the NAACP in Akron in 1962. By 1982, Farris was involved in 16 different groups and had been designated an alternate delegate to the White House Conference on Aging in 1981. Among the other groups she was involved in were the United Way, the Western Reserve Girl Scout Council, American Field Service and Alpha Kappa Alpha, in which she was a member for more than 75 years. She learned to belly dance as a senior citizen in order to get more exercise and also performed for other seniors.

In 1981, the Home Economics Alumni Association at OSU awarded Farris a distinguished service award for her leadership in the field. In 1985, she received one of 2 Distinguished Service Awards for her service in the United Way of Summit County. The University of Akron established a Leona W. Farris Scholarship in 1987.

Farris moved from Stow into Copley Place in Copley, Ohio, around 2012. She died on February 27, 2022, at the age of 104.
