= Pavol Hudák =

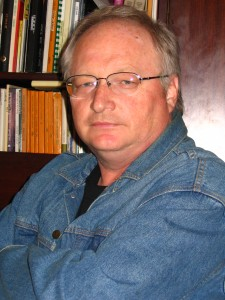
- Pavol Hudák
- Born: Pavol Hudák; 7 October 1959; Vranov nad Topľou, Czechoslovakia
- Died: 18 January 2011 (aged 51); Poprad, Slovakia
- Occupations: poet, journalist, publicist

Pavol Hudák (7 October 1959 in Vranov nad Toplou, Czechoslovakia – 18 January 2011 in Poprad, Slovakia) was a Slovak poet, journalist and publicist.

== Biography ==
He grew up and studied grammar school in Vyšný Žipov. After high school in the Vranov nad Topľou (1975–1979), he studied at the Pedagogical Faculty, University of Pavol Jozef Šafárik in Prešov (1979–1983). During each year of study, he was rewarded by various prizes at events such as Akademický Prešov, Wolkrová Polianka or other competitions. His first poems were published in periodicals New Word for Young, Dotyky, Kultúrny Život and others. Between 1983 and 1992 he worked as a teacher in a grammar school; between 1992 and 1995 he worked as a local newspaper journalist in Poprad and Vysoké Tatry area; since 1995 he has been a journalist in Nový Čas, Korzár, Pravda, Žurnál or Farmár.

Pavol Hudák is one of the most well-known Slovak authors, being the author of poetry, radio auditions, and music songs. He is the recipient of many literary awards.

== Works ==
In 1992 he released his debut collection of poetry Peachy twilight, which is devoted to the themes of family roots in the Zemplin area and individual – collective past. Book published in Levoca by the Vydavatelstvo Modrý Peter was rewarded by the Janko Kráľ award and Slovak Literature Ivan Krasko award for the best debut of the year. For his second collection, called New Year's Eve 1999, he received the VUB award in 1994 for the best collection of poems for adults. In 1999 he published his third collection, Solar Eclipse. On the basis of previous selection, he released a poetic opus called Rope in the hangman's house and other poems (2003), decorated with drawings of the painter Peter Kocák from Prešov.

His poems have been translated into Hungarian, Polish and French. He taught students at Warsaw University. The poem called Christ comes to Sarajevo was used by the well-known composer Ivan Hrušovský in Requiem at the end of Millennium. It was presented at the Music Festival in Bratislava in 1999:

- 1992 Peachy twilight
- 1994 New Year's Eve 1999
- 1999 Solar Eclipse
- 2003 Rope in the hangman's house

== Bibliography ==
- Bibliography
