= Erin Rachel Hudak =

Erin Rachel Hudak (born 1978) is a multi-media artist currently residing in Brooklyn, New York. She began her career as an assistant to David Levinthal.

Born in Stow, Ohio, Ms. Hudak creates collages, paintings and sculptures that represent ideas of freedom, power, perception and transformation. Hudak's artwork often depicts images of nature juxtaposed with images of civilization.

Ms. Hudak received her B.F.A from the Savannah College of Art and Design and attended Allegheny College for art and literature. Her work has exhibited nationally, and been featured in press internationally, including Vogue Girl Korea, DailyCandy.com, Art+Culture.com, The Village Voice, New York Daily News, Sun Valley Magazine, Beautiful/Decay, and TrendHunter. Her studio is featured in the Museum of Modern Art "MoMa PS1: Studio Visit" project.

Perhaps Ms. Hudak's best-known installation, 2006's "Love" was featured on the front page of The Bay Ridge Paper and in The Brooklyn Paper. Near-identical works soon appeared elsewhere, such as the December 2007 cover of New York Magazine. The New York Magazine cover image was credited solely to artist Michael De Feo.

On September 26, 2014, her exhibit "See/Thru" premiered at the DUMBO Arts Festival.

Ms. Hudak's husband, artist James Seward, worked as an assistant to Jeff Koons from 2005 to 2013.
