= Michael De Feo =

American artist based in New York City

Michael De Feo (born July 21, 1972) is an American artist who was an early pioneer of the street art movement in New York City. He is best known for his floral paintings, which have earned him the nickname "the Flower Guy".

== Career ==
De Feo has created street art in over 60 cities around the world, and his iconic illustration of a flower has become internationally famous. He began making street art as an art student in 1993, and a year later, painted his first flower mural on the side of a building on East 23rd Street in Manhattan. He then spent countless nights pasting hundreds of versions of that single flower all over the city's building walls. He expanded internationally from there, painting in public spaces in London, Paris, Amsterdam, Hong Kong, Buenos Aires, and Los Angeles, among others.

In 2015, after De Feo painted his signature flowers on a J. Crew advertisement at a bus stop, the brand asked him to design a line of shirts. In addition to the shirt line, his art was featured in J. Crew store windows around the world. He has collaborated with several other fashion brands, including Milly, Neiman Marcus, and Christian Louboutin.

In 2004, De Feo published his first book, Alphabet City: Out on the Streets. This award-winning children's book employs New York City as his canvas, using his paintings glued on the streets of Manhattan to illustrate each letter of the alphabet. As one reviewer noted, "De Feo's art evokes beauty and optimism with a childlike simplicity while paying homage to gritty Manhattan."

In 2019, in celebration of 25 years of his flower art project, De Feo published Michael De Feo: Flowers, featuring over 200 images of his floral street art as well as studio paintings, essays, and a history of the project.

== Art style ==
De Feo often paints bright, colorful flowers across fashion advertisements, bus stops, and the walls of buildings. His work blurs street art and fashion culture, and references themes such as the cycle of life, growth, beauty, and ephemerality. Although street art is a relatively modern medium, De Feo has been influenced by Dutch 17th century still life paintings, Victorian art, fashion magazines, and fashion advertising campaigns. According to critics, De Feo's art both subverts and celebrates the underlying images, and "contains all the necessary components to make it well and truly groundbreaking."

== Notable exhibitions ==
De Feo's work has been featured in a numerous international galleries and museums, notably at the New Museum in New York in 2003; the Aldrich Museum in Ridgefield, Connecticut in 2005; Manifesta 7 in Trento, Italy in 2008; the Underbelly Project in New York in 2010; and Jonathan LeVine's 10 years of Wooster Collective show in 2013, for which De Feo exhibited several flower paintings along with his manhole cover sculpture; Bleecker Street Arts Club in 2014; a solo exhibition at Danziger Gallery in New York in 2015; a solo exhibition at The Garage in Amsterdam in 2015; a site-specific installation at the Rice Gallery in Houston in 2016; and a School of Visual Arts alumni exhibition at the School of Visual Arts Chelsea Gallery in 2017.

== Philanthropy ==
De Feo has contributed his work to various benefit auctions and non-profit organizations, such as Free Arts and the Children's Museum of New York. Russel Simmon's philanthropy, Rush Philanthropic, chose De Feo as their featured artist of the year in 2014.

De Feo has been working with the High Line in New York since prior to its groundbreaking in 2006. In September 2016, De Feo designed signage, posters, and various artwork to celebrate the Chelsea Grasslands for the Friends of the High Line in New York.

== Personal life ==
De Feo was born in Yonkers, New York. He earned a Bachelor of Fine Arts (BFA) from the School of Visual Arts in Manhattan and a Master of Arts in Teaching (MAT) from Manhattanville College.

De Feo was a high school art teacher for 15 years, teaching ceramics, drawing, and Photoshop at Westhill High School in Stamford, Connecticut. He was very popular with students, but some parents did not approve of his street art. In 2013, he quit his teaching job to devote more time to creating art.

== Exhibitions ==
=== Selected solo exhibitions ===
- 2016 Danziger Gallery, Michael De Feo, New York, NY, July 13 – August 12
- 2016 Rice Gallery, Rice University, Crosstown Traffic, Houston, Texas, June 9 – August 28
- 2016 The Garage, The Fashion Pages, Amsterdam, the Netherlands, April 8–29
- 2014 Rush Arts Gallery, A Pocket Full of Posies, New York, NY, September 4–20
- 2011 Orange Dot Gallery, London, UK, Coming in from the Outside, March 8–15
- 2010 A’P’art: Le festival international d’art contemporain, Alpilles-Provence, France, July 8 – 13
- 2010 No Borders Contemporary Art, Hong Kong, China, Mining for Splinters and Diamonds, June 24 – Aug.14
- 2009 Hollywood in Cambodia, Buenos Aires, Argentina, New Self-Portraits, April 21
- 2008 The Editions/Artists’ Book Fair, New York, NY, Aldrich Edition, Aldrich Contemporary Art Museum, Oct. 31 – Nov. 2
- 2008 Museo de Arte de Puerto Rico, Santurce, San Juan, Puerto Rico, Flowers (interior and exterior installations), Ongoing
- 2008 Manifesta 7, Trento, Italy, Flowers (outdoor installation on the Palazzina Liberty), June 21 – Nov. 2
- 2008 Another Space, Amsterdam, the Netherlands, Another Show, April 18 – 19
- 2007 OPEN SPACE Gallery, Beacon, NY, Inside Out, September 8 – Nov. 4
- 2007 Association Le Mur Paris, Paris, France, Olympia – Hommage au Manet (outdoor billboard painting installation), July 28 – Aug. 11
- 2007 A3 Art Fair, Paris, France, Michael De Feo: Drawings and Paintings, June 25–26
- 2005 Aldrich Contemporary Art Museum, Ridgefield, CT, Two Atmospheres (outdoor installation)
- 2005 Colette, Paris, France, Alphabet City (exterior installation and book launch)
- 2005 The New Museum Store, New Museum of Contemporary Art, New York, NY, Alphabet City (indoor installation and book launch)
- 2003 90 Square Meters, Amsterdam, the Netherlands, Michael De Feo
- 2001 Halcyon, Brooklyn, NY, Michael De Feo
- 1994 The Tunnel, New York, NY, Maskarave III, Flowers
- 1994 The Rye Free Reading Room, Rye, NY, Michael De Feo

=== Selected group exhibitions ===
- 2017 Danziger Gallery at Pulse Art Fair, Miami, FL, Dec. 7 - 10
- 2017 School of Visual Arts Chelsea Gallery, New York, NY, Street Smart: The Intersection of Art and Design in the City, Nov. 18 - Dec. 20
- 2016 Danziger Gallery at Pulse Art Fair, Miami, FL, Dec. 1 - 4
- 2014 A’P’art: Le festival international d’art contemporain, Alpilles-Provence, France, July 4 – Aug. 31
- 2014 Bleecker Street Arts Club, New York, NY, April 24 – May 24
- 2013 Jonathan LeVine Gallery, New York, NY,10 Years of Wooster Collective: 2003–2013, curators Sara & Marc Schiller, Aug. 7 – 24
- 2013 Bridgette Mayer Gallery, Philadelphia, PA, Benefit Exhibition for BalletX, July 9 – Aug. 9
- 2013 Stolenspace Gallery, London, UK, VII, July 7 – 28
- 2012 Bibliothèque Toulouse, Toulouse, France, Cit’Imagine... une ville, Nov. 16, 2012 – Feb. 24, 2013
- 2011 Art Basel Miami Beach, Miami, FL, The Underbelly Show, Dec. 2 - 5
- 2011 Samuel Owen Gallery, Greenwich, CT, On Every Street, curated by Michael De Feo, Oct. 6 – Nov. 4
- 2010 Nina Sagt Galerie, Düsseldorf, Germany, Bembe: Dave The Chimp, Nov. 27 – Dec. 24
- 2010 Espace Blancs Manteaux, Paris, France, Le M.U.R. De L’Art, Oct. 28 – Nov. 1
- 2010 Aldrich Contemporary Art Museum, Ridgefield, CT, Gary Lichtenstein: 35 Years of Screenprinting, June 27, 2010 – Jan. 2, 2011
- 2009 Angell Gallery, Toronto, Ontario, Canada, Angell Group Show, Nov. 28, 2009 – Jan. 2, 2010
- 2009 Visual Arts Gallery, New York, NY, The Wilde Years: 40 Years of Shaping Visual Culture, Oct. 9 – Nov. 7
- 2009 Thinkspace Gallery, Los Angeles, CA, “The Streets of Brooklyn”, curated by Ad Hoc Art, Jan. 9 – Feb. 6
- 2008 Anonymous Gallery, The Piece Process (group exhibit), Dec. 17 – Jan. 24
- 2008 James Turrell/Baker Pool, Greenwich, CT, Special Access Tour, September
- 2008 Missouri State Penitentiary, Jefferson City, MO, Art Inside the Park (outdoor installation), Oct. 2008 - 2009
- 2008 Galerie L.J. Beaubourg, Paris, France, Le M.U.R., curated by Jean Faucheur, June 12 - July 1
- 2007 Ad Hoc Gallery, Brooklyn, NY, Behind the Seen, Dec. 13 – Jan. 20, curated by Michael De Feo
- 2006 Candle Building, New York, NY, Wooster on Spring
- 2006 Neuberger Museum, Purchase, NY, Snackshop 5000: The Vending Machine Show
- 2006 National Gallery, Dhaka, Bangladesh, 35th Independence Day Art Festival
- 2006 Stay Gold Gallery, Brooklyn, NY, Open Air
- 2006 Iron Studios, Chicago, IL, Version > 06: Urban Gardening and Exterior Decorating
- 2004 Wooster Arts Space, New York, NY, Hollywood: The Remix
- 2004 Massachusetts Museum of Contemporary Art, North Adams, MA, The Interventionists: Art in the Social Sphere
- 2003 New Museum of Contemporary Art, New York, NY, (installation for I [heart] NY)
- 2003 Die Registratur, Munich, Germany, The Art of Rebellion
- 2003 Kunstraum Kruezberg/Bethanien, Berlin, Germany, Backjumps: The Live Issue
- 2002 Artists Space, New York, NY, Repellent Magazine

== Media attention ==
=== Online and print ===
- New York Magazine
- The New York Times
- Vogue
- WWD
- Metal Magazine
- Paper Magazine
- New York Observer
- i-D
- InStyle
- The Globe and Mail
- Wonderland Magazine

=== Film, TV and radio ===
- 1995 Breakfast Time, FX (live national cable program), July 13
- 2006 To Be Seen, produced by Alice Arnold, First Run Icarus Films, screened on PBS/WLIW & The Museum of Modern Art
- 2007 Concrete Canvas, Electric Sky Productions for gallery HD (Vroom Networks), UK
- 2009 MTV Brazil, “The Flower Guy”
- 2010 Banksy's Exit Through the Gift Shop
- 2014 Rush Philanthropic Arts Foundation, New York, “A Pocket Full of Posies”, September 4
- 2016 “Michael De Feo: Crosstown Traffic” by Walley Films for Rice Gallery, Rice University, Houston, Texas

== Awards ==
- 2016 Clio Award, Fashion & Beauty, Bronze for Neiman Marcus The Book series, both covers of April Issue
- 2010 D&D Award, Wood Pencil, Magazine & Newspaper Design, Magazine Front Cover, Best of the Year for Cover of New York Magazine's "Reasons to Love New York" Issue
- 2006 Certificate of Design Excellence for the Cover of New York Magazine's Double End of the Year Issue, "Reasons to Love New York Right Now," Print Magazine Regional Design Annual, November/December
- 2005 Radius Award, Aldrich Contemporary Art Museum, Ridgefield, CT
- 2005 Certificate of Design Excellence for "Alphabet City: Out On The Streets," Print Magazine Regional Design Annual, November
