= Tyamko =

Type of small kettle drum

Tyamko ट्याम्क
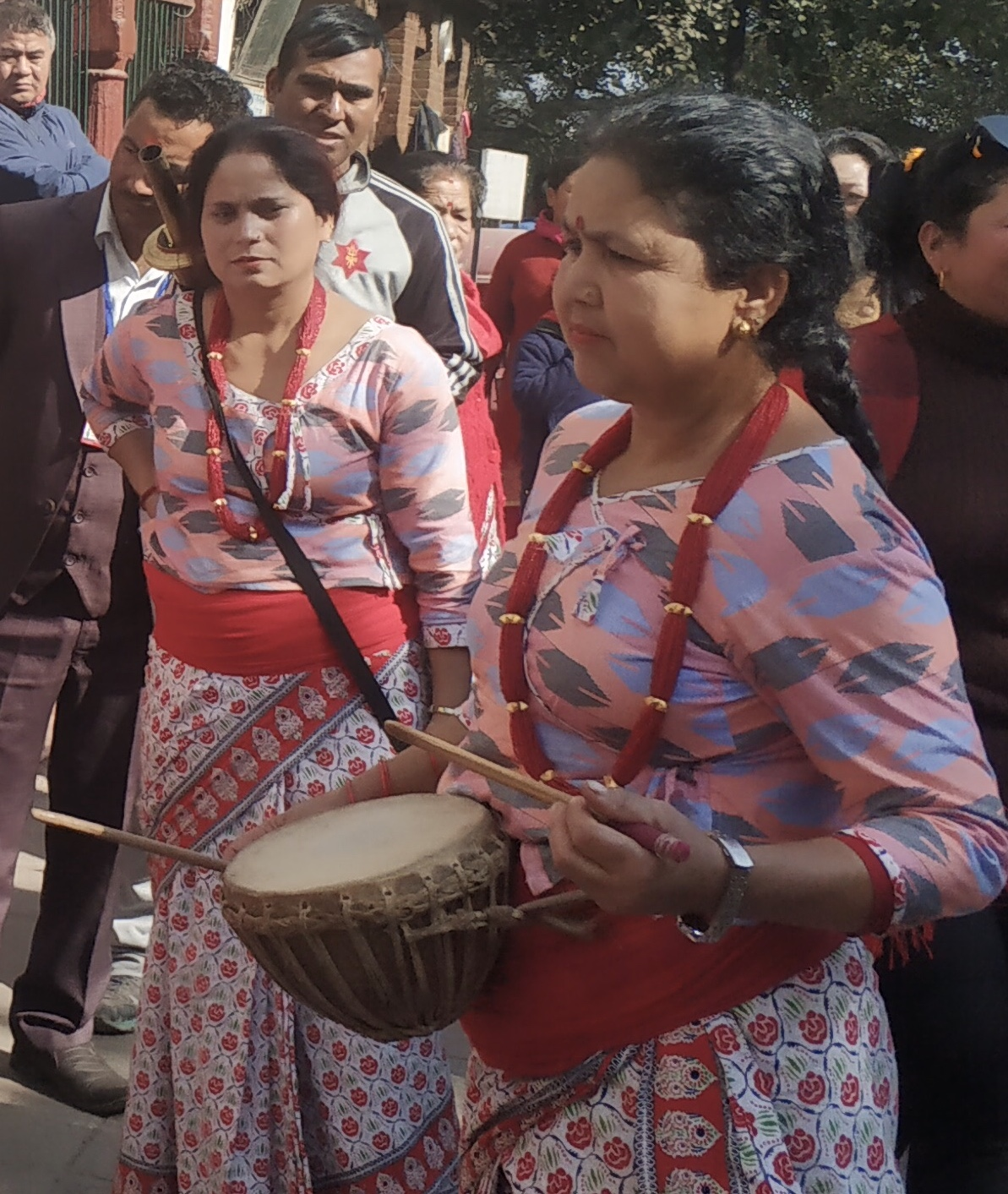
- Tyamko, smallest drum in the panche baja ensemble.
- Hornbostel–Sachs classification: 211.1 (Instruments in which the body of the drum is dish- or bowl-shaped (kettle drums))
- Developed: Nepalese variant of wider group of kettle drums that developed on Indian subcontinent, possibly related to Persian or Arabian kettledrums.

Related instruments
- Damaha; Naqareh

The tyamko (ट्याम्को) or tyamako (ट्यामको) is a small Nepali kettle drum, a prominent member of the panche baja ensemble. The body of the instrument is made of soft wood, clay, copper or iron; the skin is cowhide. It is about 15cm in diameter and 15cm high, but this can vary as instruments are not standardized. It is carried on a strap around the neck, at the waist when standing, and played with two sticks.

== See also ==
- List of Nepali musical instruments
