= Riwana =

Musical instrument

The riwana is a type of fretless lute played in Himachal Pradesh, generally with four strings, and an additional string starting from midway down the neck, like the American five-string banjo.

== See also ==
- Pamiri rubab, a similar instrument of eastern Tajikistan
