= Mike Hudak =

Michael John Hudak
- Born: December 4, 1952 (age 73); Johnson City, NY, USA
- Citizenship: United States
- Education: Binghamton University, PhD, 1986; Binghamton University, BA 1975; Northwestern University, MS Computer Science, 1977
- Known for: Persuading the Sierra Club to shift its policy on the grazing of cattle on public lands toward a science-based policy.
- Scientific career
- Fields: environmental activism
- Workplaces: Sierra Club

Michael John Hudak is an environmental researcher and author, Sierra Club activist, radio broadcaster, and public speaker concerned with the environmental damage (and harm to free-living animals, or wildlife) due to ranching on US public land (mostly in the Western states). He is an author of Western Turf Wars: The Politics of Public Lands Ranching (which focuses on grazing issues) and its companion series of web-based videos. In 1999, he founded the nonprofit Public Lands Without Livestock.Hudak's grassroots educational outreach on "public lands grazing" addressed thousands of Sierrans (Sierra Club members) and others.

== Education ==
Before focusing on environmental activism and advocacy, he was a computer industry researcher. His doctorate (1986) in Advanced Technology (Computer Science) and bachelor's degree (Mathematics) (1975) are from Binghamton University (also known as State University of New York at Binghamton), and his master's degree (Computer Science) is from Northwestern University (1977). His doctoral and industrial research within the field of artificial neural systems included modeling associative memory and investigating properties of Restrictive Coulomb Energy Classifiers. His PhD dissertation was titled "Life in an Associate Memory: Tales Demons Tell."

== Sierra Club work ==
From 1993 to 1994, he served as the Binghamton (NY) regional coordinator for the short-lived Beyond Beef Campaign (headed by Jeremy Rifkin and Howard Lyman), which mobilized grassroots support in favor of McDonald's offering a meatless (vegetarian) eco-burger at all its North American outlets.

In 1997, after several years of hiking on western public lands during which he noted livestock impacts, he began a more intensive study of livestock production by researching publications and traveling across the West for more than twenty months. Between February 1998 and May 2000, he presented forty-five photographic talks to Sierra Club groups, chapters, and committees in 20 US states to encourage a Sierra Club policy shift to oppose public lands ranching. He wrote several articles for Internet display and for publication in Sierra Club newsletters. Fifteen Sierra Club chapters and twenty-two groups (37% of Sierra Club membership) by summer 2000 had signed resolutions calling for the Sierra Club to oppose commercial livestock grazing on federal public lands.

As resource person to the Sierra Club's Grazing Task Force from June 1999 to May 2000, he learned in December 1999 that the club's National Board planned to consider revising that policy at its May 2000 meeting. When the board in early May postpone that discussion until its September meeting, he began qualifying a member ballot initiative as an alternative to board action. He called for the qualification of a ballot initiative in support of ending commercial livestock grazing on federal public lands.

While gathering signatures on the ballot petition, he chaired a Sierra Club subcommittee advocating adoption of conservation policy to end commercial livestock grazing on federal public lands. These negotiations at the September 2000 board meeting led to the grazing policy adopted by the club's board of directors at that time. He gave the agreement tentative support and called for withdrawing the ballot initiative for the following year. Some club members who had worked with him on the petition drive disagreed with his views and completed qualifying the initiative, which was subsequently defeated in the 2001 election by more than a 2-to-1 margin.

== Chrononology of Sierra Club involvement ==
- 1997 - Began intensive study of livestock's impact on western public lands
- February 1998 to May 2000–presented 45 photographic talks to Sierra Club groups
- 1999 to present - Founder and director of Public Lands Without Livestock, a project of International Humanities Center
- June 1999 to May 2000 - resource person to Sierra Club's Grazing Task Force
- December 1999 - learned that Sierra Club's National Board had planned to consider revising its grazing policy at May 2000 meeting
- September 2000 - negotiations at Sierra Club board meeting led to Club's Board of Directors adopting new grazing policy
- 2001 - Initiative defeated in 2001 election by >2-to-1 margin
- Since 2001 - researching, writing, and public speaking about unsustainable US ranching practices on America's public lands
- 2002 - Several photographs appear in Welfare Ranching: The Subsidized Destruction of the American West (George Wuerthner & Mollie Matteson, eds., Island Press, 2002)
- 2003–2004 - Included in Who’s Who in America
- October 2005–August 2007 - Corresponding member, Sierra Club National Grazing Committee
- 2006 - Several photographs appear in Wildfire: A Century of Failed Forest Policy (George Wuerthner, editor, Island Press, 2006)
- August 2007–present - Member, Sierra Club National Grazing Committee
- October 2007–July 2008 - Vice chair, Sierra Club National Grazing Committee
- July 2008–present - Chair, Sierra Club National Grazing Committee

== Affiliations, awards, achievements ==
- Founder and director of Public Lands Without Livestock, a project of International Humanities Center (1999–present)
- Chair, Sierra Club National Grazing Committee (July 2008–present)
- Vice chair, Sierra Club National Grazing Committee (October 2007–July 2008)
- Member, Sierra Club National Grazing Committee (August 2007–present)
- Corresponding member, Sierra Club National Grazing Committee (October 2005–August 2007)
- Several photographs appear in Welfare Ranching: The Subsidized Destruction of the American West (George Wuerthner & Mollie Matteson, eds., Island Press, 2002)
- Several photographs appear in Wildfire: A Century of Failed Forest Policy (George Wuerthner, editor, Island Press, 2006)
- Several photographs appear in the Sierra Club’s slide show: "Western Public Lands Grazing: The True Costs"
