= Vyšný Žipov =

Village and municipality in Slovakia

- Municipality
- Flag

- Location of Vyšný Žipov in the Prešov Region Location of Vyšný Žipov in Slovakia
- Coordinates: 48.98°N 21.58°E
- Country: Slovakia
- Region: Prešov Region
- District: Vranov nad Topľou District
- First mentioned: 1363

Area
  - Total: 9.32 km^{2} (3.60 sq mi)
- Elevation: 152 m (499 ft)

Population (2025)
  - Total: 1,161
- Time zone: UTC+1 (CET)
  - Summer (DST): UTC+2 (CEST)
- Postal code: 943 3
- Area code: +421 57
- Vehicle registration plate (until 2022): VT
- Website: www.vysnyzipov.sk

Vyšný Žipov (Hungarian: Tapolyizsép) is a village and municipality in Vranov nad Topľou District in the Prešov Region of eastern Slovakia.

== History ==
In historical records the village was first mentioned in 1363.

== Geography ==
The municipality lies at an altitude of 152 metres (499 ft) and covers an area of 9.32 km^{2} (3.60 sq mi) (2025).

== Population ==
Population statistic (10 years)
Year	1995	2005	2015	2025
Count	1161	1208	1163	1161
Difference		+4.04%	−3.72%	−0.17%

Population statistic
Year	2024	2025
Count	1164	1161
Difference		−0.25%

It has a population of 1161 people (31 December 2025).

=== Ethnicity ===
Census 2021 (1+ %)
Ethnicity	Number	Fraction
Slovak	1119	97.98%
Romani	131	11.47%
Not found out	24	2.1%
Total	1142	

In year 2021 was 1142 people by ethnicity 1119 as Slovak, 131 as Romani, 24 as Not found out, 8 as Czech, 1 as Ukrainian, 1 as Rusyn and 1 as English.

Note on population: The difference values of population numbers in the table "Population statistic" and in the sections "Ethnicity" & "Religion" is caused by the use of various statistical methods.

=== Religion ===
Census 2021 (1+ %)
Religion	Number	Fraction
Evangelical Church	532	46.58%
Roman Catholic Church	386	33.8%
Greek Catholic Church	123	10.77%
None	62	5.43%
Jehovah's Witnesses	17	1.49%
Not found out	17	1.49%
Total	1142	

In year 2021 was 1142 people by religion 532 from Evangelical Church, 386 from Roman Catholic Church, 123 from Greek Catholic Church, 62 from None, 17 from Jehovah's Witnesses, 17 from Not found out, 2 from Eastern Orthodox Church, 1 from Other and not ascertained christian church, 1 from Other and 1 from United Methodist Church.
