= Tibetan horn =

Musical instrument

The Tibetan horn or dungchen (Tibetan: དུང་ཆེན།, Wylie: dung chen, ZYPY: tungqên, literally "big conch," also called rag dung (རག་དུང་, literally "brass horn"; Mongolian: hiidiin buree (хийдийн бүрээ, literally "monastery horn"); Chinese: 筒欽; pinyin: tǒng qīn) is a long trumpet or horn used in Tibetan Buddhist and Mongolian buddhist ceremonies. It is the most widely used instrument in Tibetan Buddhist culture. It is often played in pairs or multiples, and the sound is compared to the singing of elephants. Tsultrim Allione described the sound:

It is a long, deep, whirring, haunting wail that takes you out somewhere beyond the highest Himalaya peaks and at the same time back into your mother's womb.

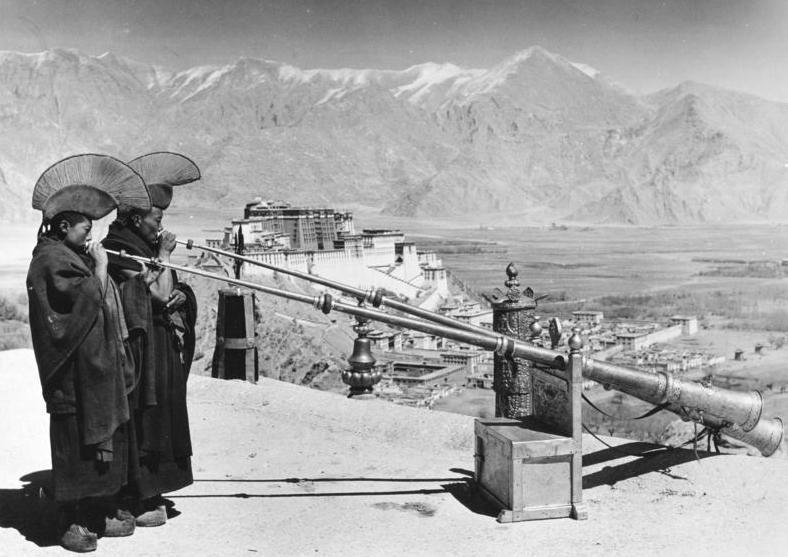
A pair of horns photographed by a 1938 German expedition

In Dosmoche festival 2018 at Leh Palace. Monks are playing long Swiss-style horns, known as dungchen, that can reach a length of 20 feet and collapse like telescopes for easy carrying. The notes produced by the horns are long, slow, low and deep, and have been compared to the sound of mooing cows

== See also ==
- Music of Tibet
- Alphorn
- Erke
