= Damai =

Nepalese occupational caste

दमाइँ
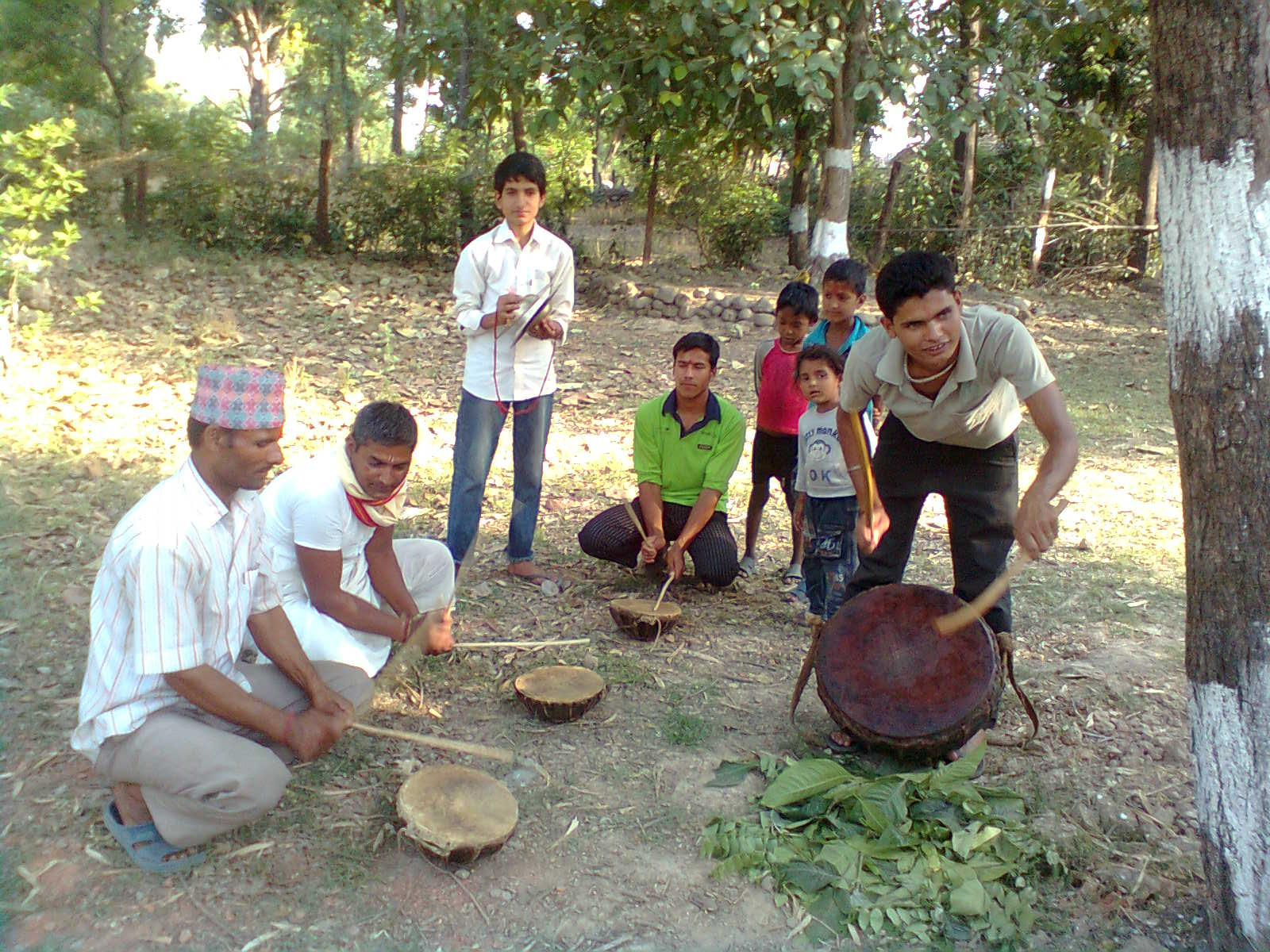
- Damai men playing traditional Damaha

Regions with significant populations
- Nepal: 565,932 (1.9% of Nepal's population) (2021)

Languages
- Kalautya Rudika (Damai kura), Nepali (Khas kura)

Religion
- Shamanism, Buddhism, Hinduism 96.59% (2011), Christianity 3.22% (2011)

Related ethnic groups
- Khas people, Kami, Badi, Sarki, Gandarbha/Gaine

The Damai (Nepali: दमाइँ pronounced [dʌmaĩ]; IAST: Damāĩ) is an occupational caste found among indigenous people comprising 45 subgroups. Their surnames take after the subgroup they belong to. People belonging to this caste are traditionally tailors and musicians capable of using the Naumati baja - an ensemble of nine traditional musical instruments. The term Damai is coined from the musical instrument Damaha. The 1854 Nepalese Muluki Ain (Legal Code) categorized Damai as a "Lower caste”.

The Government of kingdom of Nepal abolished the caste-system and criminalized any caste-based discrimination, including "untouchability" in 1963 under the rule of King Mahendra.

According to the 2021 Nepal census, Damai make up 1.94% of Nepal's population (or 565,932 people). Damai are categorized under "Hill Dalit" among the 9 broad social groups, along with Kami, Badi, Sarki and Gaine by the Government of Nepal.

== Geographical distribution ==
At the time of the 2011 Nepal census, the frequency of Damai by province was as follows:

- Karnali Province (4.0%)
- Gandaki Province (3.9%)
- Sudurpashchim Province (2.6%)
- Lumbini Province (1.9%)
- Koshi Province (1.8%)
- Bagmati Province (1.4%)
- Madhesh Province (0.2%)

The frequency of Damai was higher than national average (1.8%) in the following districts:

- Parbat (7.5%)
- Myagdi (5.8%)
- Kalikot (5.1%)
- Dailekh (5.0%)
- Baglung (4.7%)
- Doti (4.6%)
- Surkhet (4.6%)
- Mustang (4.4%)
- Bajura (4.2%)
- Jajarkot (4.0%)
- Lamjung (3.9%)
- Dadeldhura (3.8%)
- Gulmi (3.7%)
- Kaski (3.7%)
- Syangja (3.7%)
- Western Rukum (3.7%)
- Rolpa (3.6%)
- Humla (3.5%)
- Tanahun (3.4%)
- Okhaldhunga (3.3%)
- Arghakhanchi (3.2%)
- Eastern Rukum (3.2%)
- Mugu (3.2%)
- Pyuthan (3.2%)
- Achham (3.1%)
- Sindhuli (3.1%)
- Tehrathum (3.1%)
- Gorkha (3.0%)
- Salyan (3.0%)
- Udayapur (2.8%)
- Dang (2.7%)
- Khotang (2.7%)
- Bhojpur (2.6%)
- Dhading (2.5%)
- Jumla (2.5%)
- Nawalpur (2.5%)
- Kanchanpur (2.3%)
- Ramechhap (2.3%)
- Dolakha (2.2%)
- Kailali (2.2%)
- Panchthar (2.2%)
- Sankhuwasabha (2.2%)
- Baitadi (2.1%)
- Chitwan (2.1%)
- Dhankuta (2.1%)
- Jhapa (1.9%)
- Palpa (1.9%)
- Sindhupalchowk (1.9%)

== Bibliography ==
- Whelpton, John (2005). A History of Nepal. Cambridge University Press. ISBN 978-0521804707.
