= Damaha =

Type of drum

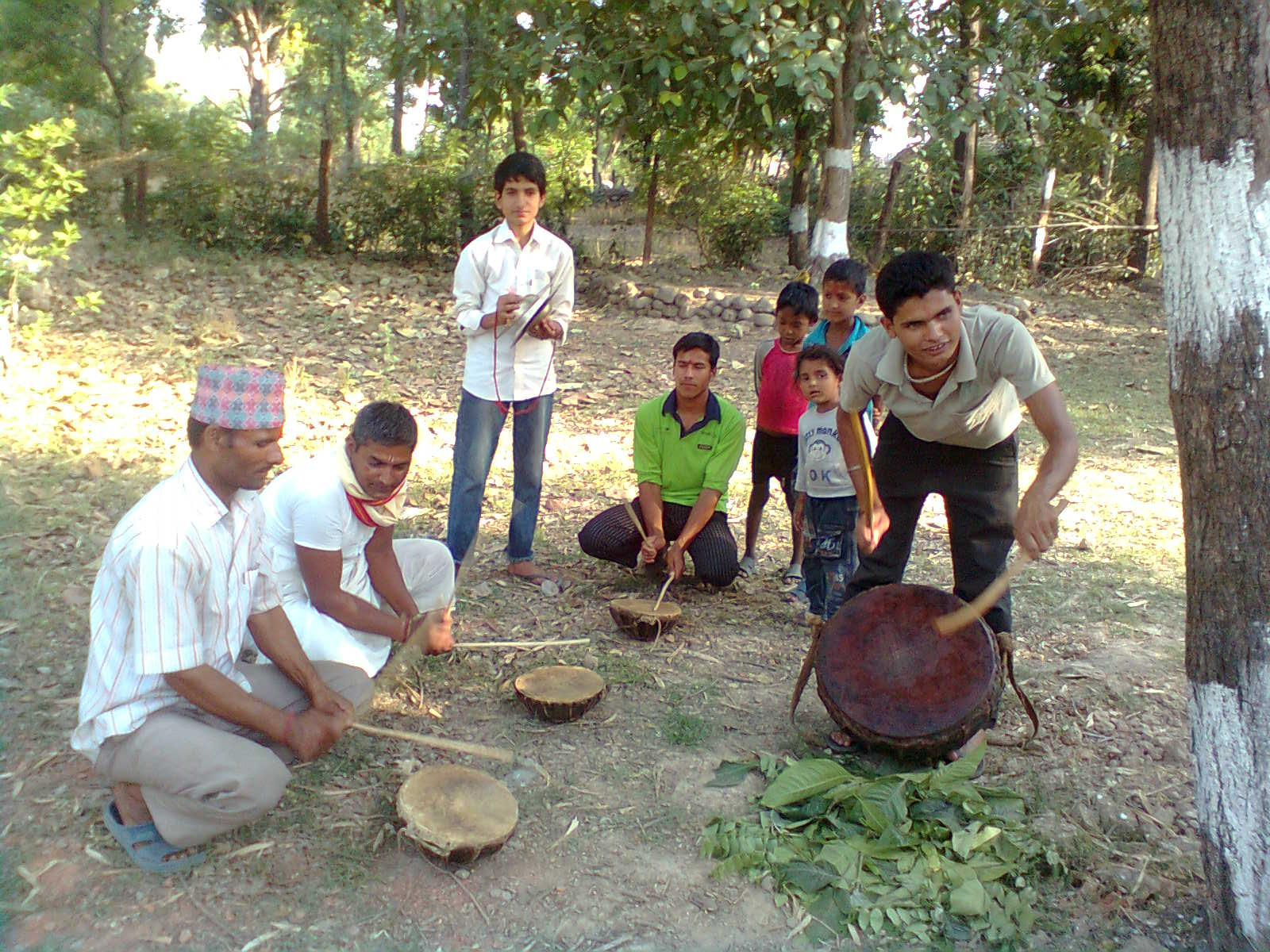
Villagers playing Damaha

Damaha (Nepali: दमाहा) is a drum made from leather, brass or wood. It is played by striking with a stick. It is one of the instruments included in the Panche Baaja, a set of Nepali musical instruments. The traditional players of this instrument are called Damai, an occupational caste who play different instrument in Nepali culture.

The Damaha is bowl-shaped like a kettle drum and covered with animal hide. A neck strap is used to hold the damaha for the player while he plays.
