= List of Nepali musical instruments =

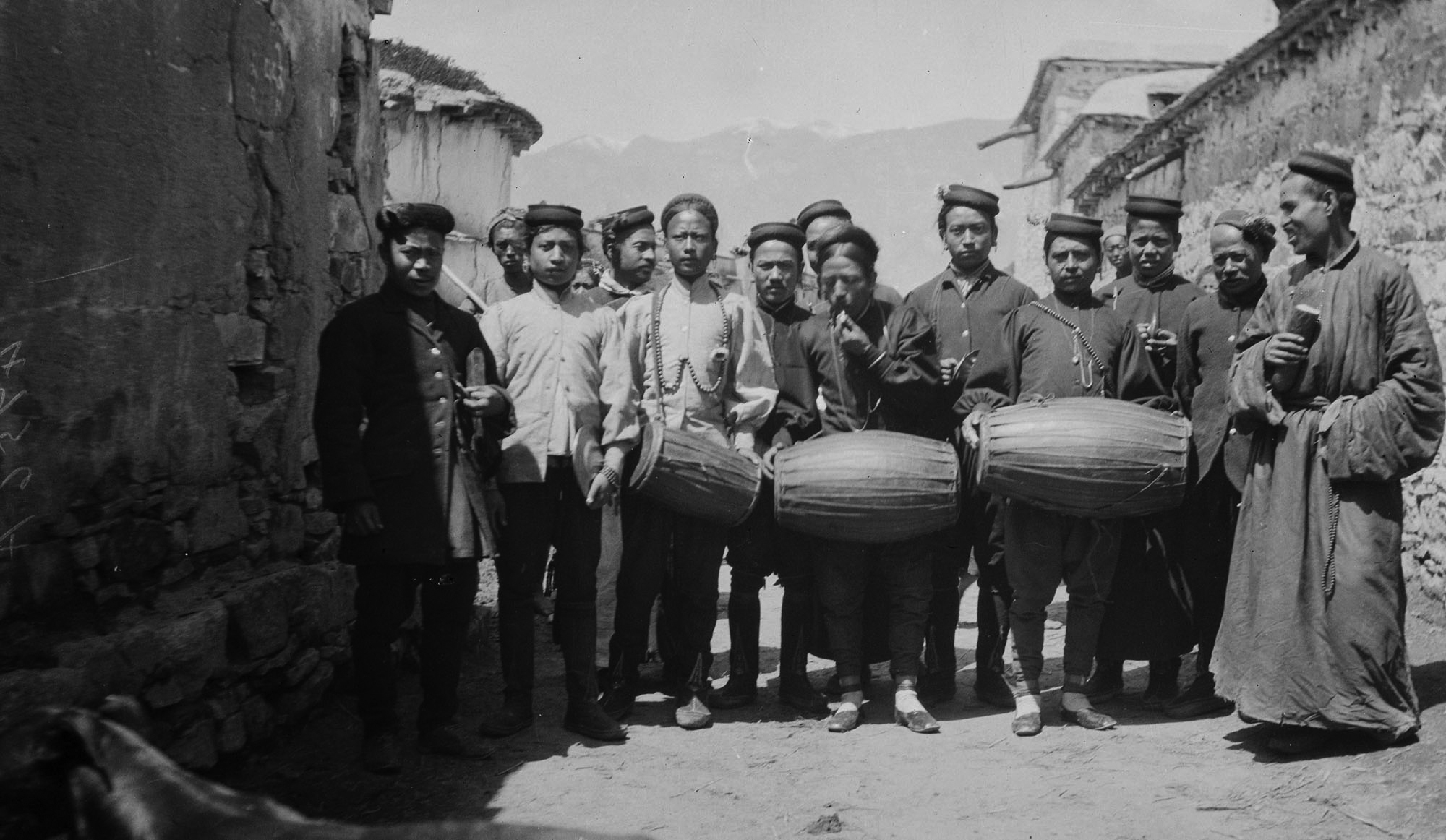
Newar merchants of Kathmandu, Nepal parading in Lhasa, Tibet playing drums in 1903.

This list contains "traditional" musical instruments used in Nepal. Instruments overlap with nearby countries, including India and Tibet. An example is the Sarangi, a common bow Indian instrument. Although the Nepali people have their own local variant Sarangi (Nepal), both instruments are known in Nepal. Some of the instrument are madal, maddlam, dholak. In such cases where instruments were imported in ancient times, or when both varieties are played in Nepal, both can be included on the list. New instruments of Nepali origin may be included, as well as modern recreations of extinct instruments. Modern imports such as the western guitar are not included.

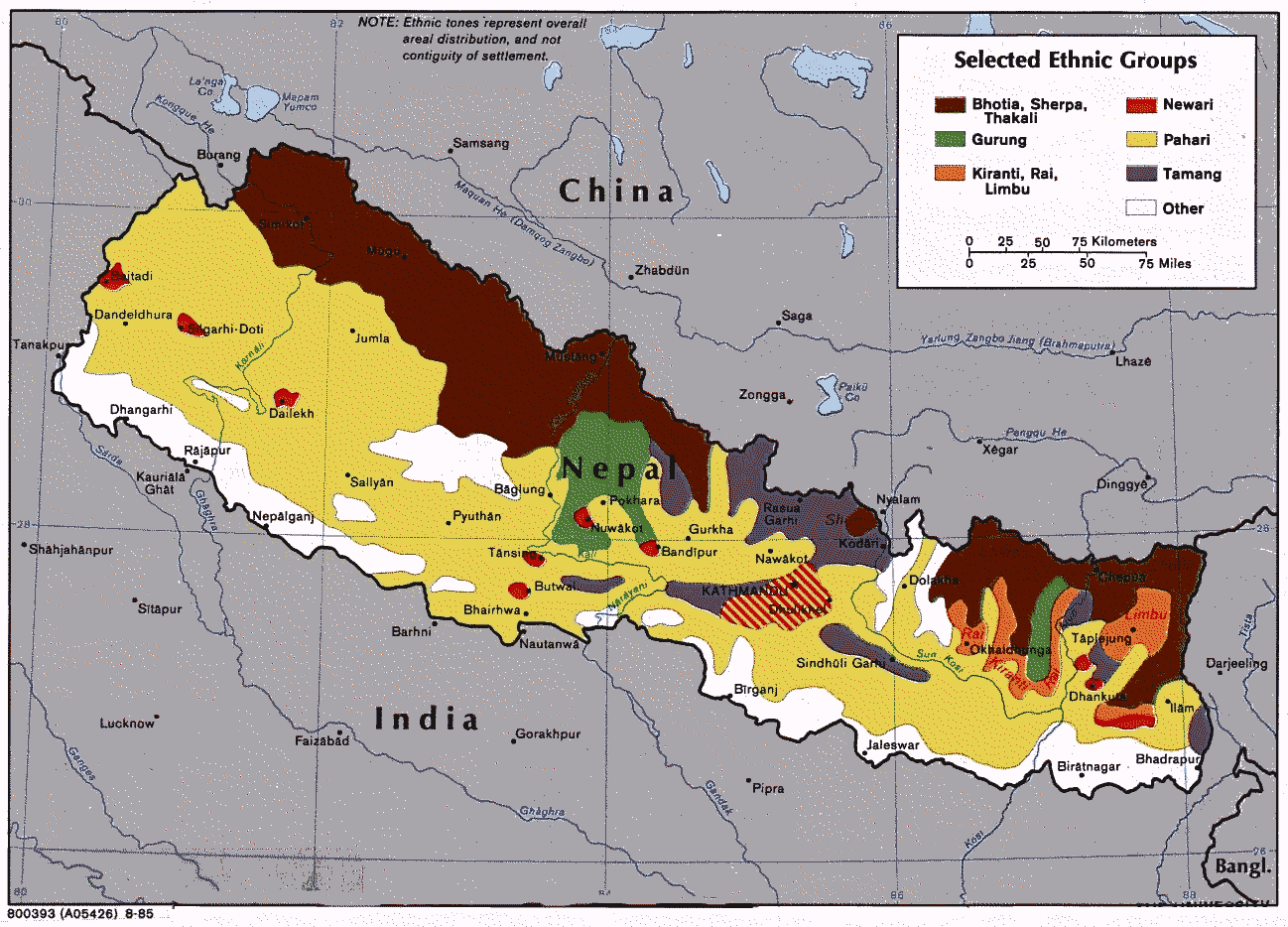
Nepal ethnic groups (note that Kulu Rodu (Kulung) territories are mistakenly marked as Tamu/Gurung territories in this map)

There are hundreds of Nepali musical instruments and they are not standardized. When considering seemingly identical instruments, the languages, region of origin, musician's ethnicity and local traditions may affect the instrument's identity and how it is played.

== Research avenues ==
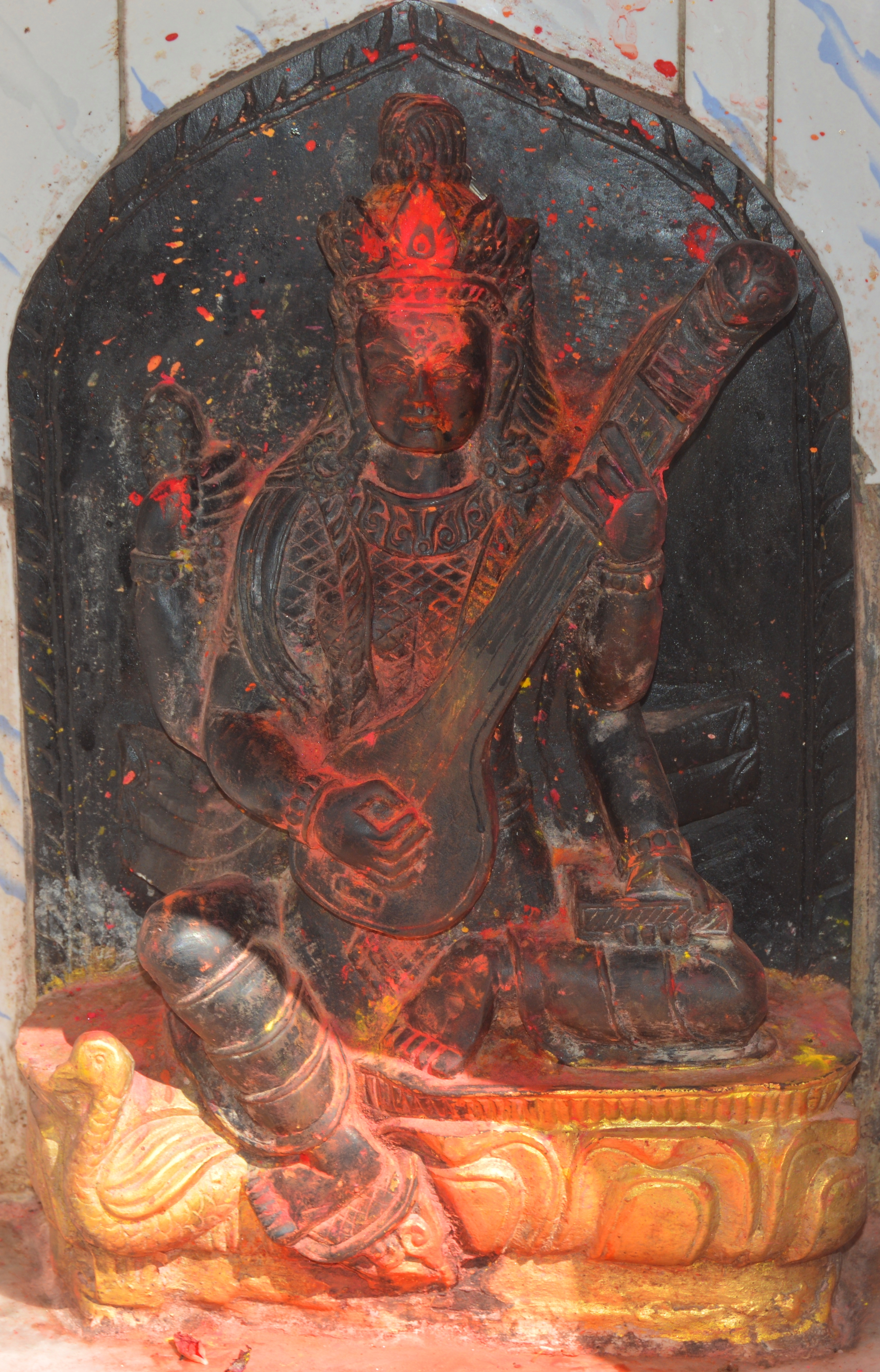
Modern sculpture of the Hindu Goddess Saraswati with an unnamed lute-style veena in Kathmandu. Images like this give clues to the nature of old musical instruments, if the artifact can be reliably placed to a particular place and past date.

Many Nepali folk instruments or lokabaja (नेपाली लोकबाजा) date back into prehistory or inaccessible history. General histories of musical instruments, such as History of Musical Instruments by Kurt Sachs, have little to say directly about Nepal. Sachs focused two chapters on India, and when addressing the ranasrnga, on Northern India. When instruments used in Nepal were included in Sachs' book, such as drums with hooked sticks (p. 157), the dameru (p. 159), the lute with a barb on its sides (160–161), the sarangi (226), and the ranasrnga (p. 228), the organizational focus was on India, or "North India."

JSTORE, an online repository of academic journals has articles. An example by Thomas O. Ballinger and Purna Harsha Bajracharya, Nepalese Musical Instruments, Southwestern Journal of Anthropology, Published by: The University of Chicago Press, Vol. 16, No. 4 (Winter, 1960), pp. 398–416 (19 pages). Thomas compares the instruments he found with that found in books by A. Campbell and Daniel Wright. Gives descriptions of instruments.

History of Nepal, by Daniel Wright, Cambridge: University Press, 1877.
Notes on the Musical Instruments and Agricultural and Other Instruments of the Nepalese, by A. Campbell, Journal of the Asiatic Society of Bengal, Vol. 6 (1837), pp. 953-963.

The Grove Dictionary of Musical Instruments is a more comprehensive resource, with many instruments having been documented by ethnomusicologists. Random entries for Nepali instruments include Arbajo, Damaha, the Kingdom of Nepal [and its instruments and international music relationships] and the ghanta (both large "male" bells and smaller "female" handbells). This resource requires either a subscription (not inexpensive), access to a university library, or purchase of the $995 set of books.

The Garland Encyclopedia of World Music, Volume 5: South Asia, the Indian subcontinent does address Nepal directly in a chapter.

Museum and museum catalogs: In 1995, a local project was begun in Nepal, to document the folk instruments there. Ram Prasad Kadel began to visit different parts of his country and collect examples of instruments that he found. He talked to musicians and made recordings. In 1997, he founded the Nepali Folk Instruments Museum, which opened to the public in 2002 in Kathmandu. Kadel wrote two books, catalogues of some of the museum's instruments. Nepali Lokbaja or Folk Musical Instruments of Nepal was published in 2004. The Nepali-language book contains entries and images for 375 instruments. The language made the contents inaccessible to most readers outside Nepal. In 2007 Kadel's Musical Instruments of Nepal was published, an English-language book with 362 Nepali instruments and more detailed pictures. The book is the only book in the English language whose focus is Nepali folk musical instruments. Today his museum has more than 40,000 hours of recordings.

== Membranophones ==
=== Tambourines and frame drums ===
| Name in English | Name in Nepali | Description | Ethnic Connections | Town / Region | Picture |
|---|---|---|---|---|---|
| Daanf | डाँफ | A frame drum of 28 centimeters diameter, covered with goat hide, held in place by bamboo lathes piercing skin and hooped across. It is sometimes decorated with peacock feathers on top. | Tharu | Chitwan District | Tharu dancers holding Daanf at a local festival |
| Daha | tambourine. | | | | |
| Dambaa or damphu | डम्बा or डम्फु | A 45-cm frame drum made of the Nepali Koiralo wood and Himalayan goral hide on one side held in place by 32 bamboo lathes. It may be decorated by the carving of a Himalayan monal bird on top. | Tamang | | Dambaa (back side) Tamang dancers in the United States with a dambaa. |
| Damphu | (डम्फू) | Drum, similar to large tambourine. | Tamang people | | Nepali people playing "Damphu", one of their traditional instruments. |
| Dafa | | A tambourine-sized frame drum. Used in Bansuri Bajan or Khin Bajan. | | | |
| Hring | हृङ | A frame drum, with single goatskin head, of 45 centimeters diameter, with religious (Tantric Buddhist) symbols hanging on a chain. Originally used by Chepang people living in the mountains of Mahabharata mountain range, used for jharphuk (healing ritual) and tantra mantra. | Chepang people | Dhading District, Makwanpur District, Chitwan District | Possible Hring. |
| Dhyāngro | ढ्याङ्ग्रो | A single headed or double headed frame drum, may have a handle; used by jhakri (shamans) and Buddhist musicians. | *Magars, Kirati, Tamang, jhakri (shamans), Tibetan Buddhist musicians | | |
| Jhyaali Khainjadi | | A Khaijadi tambourine with mujura (मुजुरा) cymbals. It may have as many as four holes in its sides, to which the mujura cymbals are fastened so they jingle as the instrument is being played. | | | Two men holding different kinds of Khaijadi; right instrument has jingles. |
| Khaijadi or Kanjira or Khañjari | खैंजडी | A leather-covered tambourine covered on only one side, used in Nepali society since ancient times. 7-9 inches diameter x 2-4 inches deep. Deer or goat skin. The khanjadi is slightly smaller than the damphu. Traditionally used to accompany hymns and religious dance by Brahmin cast. The Magar and Gurung use larger drums. The Brahmin and Chhetri use smaller drums for devotional music. | Chhetri-Brahmin society, Magar, Gurung | Midwestern Nepal | Another kind of Khaijadi. |

=== Kettle drums and single-headed drums ===
| Name in English | Name in Nepali | Description | Ethnic Connections | Town / Region | Picture |
|---|---|---|---|---|---|
| Dibya nagara or Dam nagara | दिव्य नगरा | Very large, copper, unpitched kettle drum (190 centimeter diameter), topped with cowhide and beaten with sticks. All but gone; two pairs remain at the Durbar Squares in Kathmandu and Bhaktapur. Played during ceremonies to Degu Teleju Bhahani, patron goddess of Newar people. Name of the Damai comes from association with this instrument. | Newar people | | Pair of Dibya nagaras at Durbar Square, Kathmandu. |
| Damaha | दमाहा | Copper kettle drum, about 30 centimeters tall x 38 centimeters diameter, topped with cowhide, beaten with a single large stick. Part of the panche baja ensemble. Large: thulo damaha (ठूलो दमाह). Slightly smaller and less loud, used in supportive role: sauntal (बाउँताल). Small: sano damaha (सानो दमाहा). | Damai | | (Near to far): Two damaha drums, a tyamko drum, and a dholaki drum at a Hindu wedding in Nepal. |
| Dugdugi | | Pair of single-sided goatskin drums tied together, about 18 cm and 12 cm across, played barehanded. Carried at the waist. Accompany "enthusiastic" folk dances. Played by young men while dancing for young women. Not the same as the dugdugi of Bangladesh, which is an hourglass drum. | Tharu people | | |
| Koncha-Khin, | कोचा खिं | Single headed drum, about 33-45 centimeters high, 18-22 centimeters diameter at head. Drum gets wider from head for about 3/4 of its length, then slopes inward. Base has air hole. Skin head tensioned by stings running from head to base and back. Head has black tuning paste. Hangs on left shoulder at waist, played with right hand (no stick). Accompanied by wind instruments. Mainly played in marriage processions and accompanied with baboocha, Tah and Baya or Muhali." | Jyapu | | |
| Tabala | तबला | Two small drums of slightly different sizes and shapes, played as a pair. | | | Kathmandu musicians play tabla and harmonium. |
| Tyampko | ट्याम्को | A small Nepali kettle drum, a prominent member of the panche baja ensemble. The body of the instrument is made of soft wood, clay, copper or iron; the skin is cowhide. It is about 15cm in diameter and 15cm high, but this can vary as instruments are not standardized. It is carried on a strap around the neck, at the waist when standing, and played with two sticks. | Damai | Western Nepal | |
| Nagara, Naqareh | नगरा | Copper kettle drums, 45-65cm diameter. Old instrument, formerly player at "victory ceremonies." One remaining use is to celebrate Dashain (दशैं), at the Dashain Mela festival. | | Gajul, Rolpa District | |

=== Hourglass drums ===
| Name in English | Name in Nepali | Description | Ethnic Connections | Town / Region | Picture |
|---|---|---|---|---|---|
| Damaru | डमरू | Also called KantanDabDab. Small hourglass drum with bead strikers. | | | |
| Hudko | हुड्को | It is found as much in northern India as in Nepal, a two headed drum made from wood and copper is 30 cm long body x 20 cm diameter at drumheads, with a narrow waist. It is hollowed out on the lathe; metal sometimes replaces wood. The tightened part houses a small hole allowing the "breathing" of the instrument. The goatskin membranes are attached to rings laced with a cord providing variable tension. It is worn over the shoulder and held in the left hand, which grips the instrument at the central part while varying the tension and therefore the pitch of the sound; the right strikes the head with a bare hand. Accompanies folk dances but also jâgar shamanic rituals. | Damai | Western Nepal | Tamil Udukkai drum, similar to Nepali drum. |

=== Long two-headed drums ===
| Name in English | Name in Nepali | Description | Ethnic Connections | Town / Region | Picture |
|---|---|---|---|---|---|
| Chyabrung or Ke | च्याब्रुङ | Wooden drum, the ends covered with cowhide, 100 cm long x 45 cm diameter. Has stick mounted internally (and wooden rings attached to stick) to vibrate and wrattle while dum is played. One drumhead odd player with the bare hand, the other with a stick. | Rai, Limbu | Ilam | . |
| Dhaa or Dhah | धाः | Two headed drum, (38 centimeters x 20 centimeters), one head played with hand, the other with tuning paste on inside played with a stick. Used in festivals in Gulan near temples. Plays in Dapha bhajana Khala. | | | Possible Dhaa drums and bhusya cymbals at Tebaha Gunla Bajan Buddhist devotional musical society playing in Kathmandu. |
| Dhimay or Aelapohn dhime | धिमय् | Large (20"x16", 60 cm x 30 cm) two-headed drum, heads made from goathide, can be carried while playing. One side played with a stick. The other side (with tuning paste on the inside) is hand-drummed. | Jyapu farmers | Kathmandu Valley | Ma Dhimay (front) and Aelapohn dhime (back) |
| Ma Dhimay | मा धिमे | A larger dhimay. Double headed drum, 80 centimeters long x 50 centimeters diameter, Uttis log hollowed out, heads covered with goatskin, one side has tuning paste on inside and played with hand, other side played with stick. | Jyapu | Kathmandu Valley | |
| Dhahcha Dhimay or Yalaypoh Dhimay | | Both smaller than dhimay. | | | |
| Dholak | ढोलक | Two-headed wooden drum with cowhide drumheads, about 40 cm long x 20 cm diameter. Extra thick hide on one end, to be beaten with a stick. Other side is played with the bare hand. Accompanied by muhali. | Kapali | Lalitpur in the Kathmandu Valley | |
| Dholaki | ढोलकी | Drum, about 40 centimeters long x 20 centimeters diameter, made of Daar wood, right side covered with cowhide, left with goathide. Used in Panchai Baajaa as main rhythm instrument in Bagmati Zone and Gandaki Zone. Right side beat with stick and with fingers, left side used only the hand to beat. | | Bagmati Zone, Gandaki Zone | Dholaki, part of Panche baja |
| Name in English | Name in Nepali | Description | Ethnic Connections | Town / Region | Picture |
| Khin | | Two-headed drum with different diameter heads, tuned with paste. | | | |
| Magah Khin | | Same as madal. Two membrane drum tuned with tuning paste. Was specific to magar community, but "has become an important part in Newar folk music." | Magar | | Paisari dance. |
| Naya-Khin | नाय खिं or नाय्खि | A two-headed drum like dhah or dhimay, about 14" long x 7" diameter, used in rituals, known as 'Seeh Bajan' (funeral drum), to proclaim news in ancient times ("In the Malla period"). "Mainly played by the Khadgis." | Kadgis | | Possible Naya-Khin drums and chhusya cymbals at performance of Gunla Bajan religious music at Kathmandu Durbar Square. |
| Pasta-Khin or Kwatah Khin | पस्ता खिं | Term is used when Dapha Khin and Naya Khin play together...Pastah Khin is accompanied with Ponga and Tah. | | | |
| Yaaka khin | | Double-headed drum made of soft wood, 75 centimeters long, the drumheads covered in cowhide, both heads have tuning paste.. Drum is hung around the neck, down to the waist; hand-drummed. Played at festivals, accompanies songs and hymns. Other names: can be called Dapa khin when "played in Dapa Bhajans (traditional hymns)...a single Khin is called Yakah Khin and two Khins are called as 'Joh Khin'." | Newar people | Kathmandu Valley | Drummers performing at Kartik Naach. |
| Madal or maadal | मादल | Two-headed drum, one head larger. Smaller than dholak. Tuning pâté on both heads. | | | Nepali woman plays the maadal. |
| Pakhawaaja | पखावज | Double-headed wood drum, curved sides, wider in the middle, the ends covered with ox hide. About 80 centimeters long. Is tuned with spots of tuning paste on the drum heads; also tuned by adjusting tuning pegs/spools. Possibly related to the Indian Pakhavaj. | Newar people | Kathmandu Valley | Drummer plays a Pakhawaaja at the Lalitpur District, Nepal. |
| Unidentified drum of Raute people | | | Raute | Machaina village, Jajarkot District | Raute elder drumming during dance in Machaina village, 1997. |

=== Multiple heads nested ===
- Tri Taal, block with nested drum-heads

== Idiophones ==
=== Bells ===
- Yakuchaa Babhu, bell
- Ghote, circlet of bells on a leather thong.

| Name in English | Name in Nepali | Description | Ethnic Connections | Town / Region | Picture |
|---|---|---|---|---|---|
| Ghanta or Gan | घण्टी | Ceremonial bells. Hindu temples generally have one metal bell hanging at the entrance and devotees ring the bell while entering the temple. | | | Big ghanta and little ghanta outside a temple |
| Dibya Ghanta (divine bell) | दिव्य घण्ट | Very large bells were made for the three Newar kingdoms. The dibya ghantas each hung from a wooden crossbeam by very thick chains. They were located in Kathmandu Durbar Square (big enough that 16 men could fit inside), Bhaktapur Durbar Square (holds 8 men), and Patan Durbar Square, Lalipur (holds 12 men). The dibya ghantas were used during evenings in prayer to Degu Teleju Bhadani, the patron goddess of the Newar people of Nepal. | | | Taleju Bell in Kathmandu's Durbar Square. |
| Small Ghanta | | Small bells at a temple, often outside. Bells often made of alloy of lead, copper, zinc, nickel and chromium. | Hindus | | Bells at Dakshinkali Temple. |
| Phye Ghan | फ्ये गँ: | Small bell (about 18 centimeters high) with a wind-activated clapper. | | | Bell at Patan Durbar Square |
| Mate Ghanta | | Small bells suspended in circle under large bell with clapper to catch wind; a windchime. | | | |
| Name in English | Name in Nepali | Description | Ethnic Connections | Town / Region | Picture |
| Ghalting | घाल्टिङ | Bell played in religious worship and at the temple. "Pure and holy because it is rung only during worship." Rung before rice planting at Jaatri ceremony. Brass bell, about 10 centimeters high x 6 centimeters diameter. | Dhimal people. | | |
| Dilbu | | Also called ghanta, drilbou, and tribu (Tibet). Brass hand-bell used in Tantric Buddhism. About 18 centimeters long x 10 centimeters diameter. The handle is in form of "Bajra" or Vajra, a type of ceremonial club with a ribbed spherical head. Handle represents male, bell represents female. | Tantric Buddhists | | |
| Baisnava ghantra | | Bell of brass or pancha dhatu alloy with Shesha Naga on top. Shesa Naga figure may resemble lotus leaf. Played while worshipping Vishnu. | Vaishnava Hindus. Also other Hindu societies during (Puja). | | Bell from Java, similar to Baisnava Ghanta, lotus leaf on top. |
| Ghunguru | घुँघुरा | Small bell about 1 cm or smaller, ball shaped, iron ball inside. Can be sewn onto cloth or on string. | | | |
| Chaanp | चाँप | Ankle bells. Three rows of 9 ghungroo sewn onto thick cloth, worn by female dancers (or men in female role). | | | |
| Kaalwaal khuruwaa or Kaankara | ? or खाँकर | Hollow metal anklets with iron balls inside, make noise when moving feet, worn by female dancers. Tube is about 12 cm in diameter. | Mech people, Koche | Jhapa District | Indian made anklet. |
| Name in English | Name in Nepali | Description | Ethnic Connections | Town / Region | Picture |
| Khachhad Ghanta | | Mule (khachhad) bell Bell hung on the neck of the leading mule while packing loads in the hills. Thin iron, about 20 centimeters long x 13 centimeters diameter. Other mules wear smaller (about 15 centimeter long bells). | | | |
| Ghodi ghanta | | Horse (ghodda) bell. Brass bell worn on the necks of horses grazing, to help locate them in the mountains. About 7.5 centimeters length x 7.5 centimeters diameter. Bell removed during horseback riding. Brass bell, very loud. | | | |
| Ghamdo | घाँडो | Iron horse bell. Used in hunting; hunters would follow the sound of the bell. | Sunuwar people | | |
| Gau ghanta | | Iron bells (set of three) worn by the head cow (gai) (in herds owned by Brahmins. Other cows, such as bulls and calves have single bells. About 10 centimeters long x 6 centimeters diameter. | | | |
| Chaunri ghanta | चौरी घण् | Yak bell, various designs with thunderbolt on top and a flat bottom, about 13 centimeters long x 7.5 centimeters diameter. | | | |
| Galambe | गलम्बे | Folk instrument of Sunuwar caste. Also, iron bell worn around the neck of a hunting dog. About 10 centimeters long x 5 centimeters diameter. | Sunuwar people | | |
| Boke ghanta | बोके घण् | Goat (bokaa) bell. Bell worn by goats that are dedicated to a god or goddess. A warning not to harm the animal to avoid sin. | | | |
| Bayal ghanta | | Wooden bells hung around the necks of oxen (teraai goru) pulling a cart. Rectangular, about 15 centimeters tall x 20 centimeters wide with two or four wooden clappers inside. Made of white teak (Gmelina arborea)or Trewia nudiflora | Tharu people | | A carved wooden bell. This one is from Tribal Museum, Koraput, Odisha, India. |
| Kole or Ko La | कोले | Water buffalo bells, worn around neck of buffalo. Rectangular bell with sloped roof (looks like simple house), made of thin sheets of iron, with bone or iron clapper. About 5 inches long x 4 inches wide. | | Midwestern region, Terai | |

=== Cymbals ===
| Name in English | Name in Nepali | Description | Ethnic Connections | Town / Region | Picture |
|---|---|---|---|---|---|
| Jhyālī or Jhyamta or jhurma | Jhyali झ्याली, Jhurma (झुर्मा) | These instruments have blended together when Nepali people have reported on what instruments to include in the Panche baja, although there is a difference between the Jhyali and Jhurma, noted in Kadel's Musical Instrument's of Nepal. The cymbals are about 20-26 inches across, and have a boss about 6 cm high. "Held horizontally and the stroked across each other to produce a distinct sustained chattering sound." The jhali may accompany Naya Khin. | Newar | Kathmandu Valley | |
| Baboocha | | Thinner and larger than Tah. "accompanies Dapha Khin, Pachima, Koncha Khin, Dholak..." | | | Cymbals at the Gai Jatra festival. |
| Bhusyah | भूस्याः | Larger thinner than tah and baboocha, accompanies dhimay and dhah. 23 cm diameter. | | | Dhaa drum and bhusya cymbals during Tebaha gunla bajan |
| Chhusyah or Sichhya | छुस्या: | Brass cymbals like baboocha but larger, about 40 cm across; accompanies Naya Khin and Nagara. Thin metal. | Newar, Khadgi | | Cymbals at Gai Jatra festival, Bhaktapur. |
| mujura | मुजुरा | Small bronze cymbals connected by a cord. Similar to tah | | | |
| Taa | | Brass cymbals, about 25 cm diameter, played in conjunction with Chyaabrung (also called Ke). Used by young unmarried Limbu women. Photo of Rai woman with cymbals placed here; the Rai and Limbu peoples are both Kirats. | Limbu people | Eastern Region | Rai woman with cymbals. |
| Tah or taah | ताः | Small cymbals (about 20 cm across, 7.9 inches, .5 cm thick) connected by a cord. Controls the music's rhythm. "Accompanies Dhah, Dapha Khin, Paschima, Koncha Khin, Naya Khin (when played as Gunla Bajab). Used in Charya dances and songs. Similar to mujura. | Newar, Buddhists | | Cymbals accompanying Yaaka Khin drums at Kartik Naach, 2018 |
| Tinchhu | | Brass cymbals about 15cm across (6 inches). Thick (1cm). Used by the Newar to chant and worship, during processions (including secular). Gives beat to other instruments in traditional dances. | Newar | Kathmandu Valley | Possible Tinchhu cymbals at the Bhaktapur Gai Jatra in 2015 |
| | | | | | Cymbals in Jhong |

=== Gongs ===
- TainNain. Gong.
- Tinimuni. Metal percussion triangle.

=== Jaw harps ===
| Name in English | Name in Nepali | Description | Ethnic Connections | Town / Region | Picture |
|---|---|---|---|---|---|
| Binayo | बिनायो | bamboo jaw harp. | | | Two Rai women. The woman on the left is playing the binayo. |
| Murchunga | मुर्चुङ्गा | Jaw harp. | | | Murchunga jaw harp |

=== Jingles, clappers, struck objects ===
| Name in English | Name in Nepali | Description | Ethnic Connections | Town / Region | Picture |
|---|---|---|---|---|---|
| Chimtaa Jhyaali | | Two metal plates, connected at the bottom with jhalli in a row on each side; falls open from the top. Can be clapped together or shaken to sound the jyalli, or the musician can run his hands over the jyalli cymblas. The ring can also be struck against the body of the stick. May have a place in the center to hold and snap the halves together. About 60 cm long. Used by Yogis while chanting. | | | The Indian chimta is the same instrument. Playing music in front of Boudhanath (सोयम्भुनाथ). |
| Ghintanghisi or Ghintang ghisi | | A single stick carried by dancers during festivals such as Gai Jatra. The Ghintang Ghisi dance is celebrated for almost a week, starting from the day of Gaijatra to Krishna Janmashtami. The dance is done in a long queue with two persons in a row. As dancers dance to the rhythms of drums and cymbals, they raise their ghintanghisi and tap them in the air against the instrument held by another dancer. | Newar people | Kathmandu Valley especially Bhaktapur | Men dancing and playing ghintanghisi during Gai Jatra, in front of the Nyatapole Mandir temple in the Kathmandu Valley. |
| Kartal | करताल | A jingle. Nepal has many in different forms, including blocks (Dhode Kataal, Kastha kartaala and Khajadaa), handle-mounted including Khanjari for one hand and Jhaal (with two handles). | | | Indian khartal blocks. |
| Dhode Kartaal | ढोडे कर्ताल | Rectangular blocks with jhyaali cymbals mounted in a row of holes. The blocks are rectangular, about 45 centimeters long x 7.5 centimeters wide. One block has a thumb hole, the other slots on one edge for the fingers. They are played one handed by clapping the blocks together in the hand. | Brahmin, Chhetri | Central Region | |
| Jhaal | झाल | A jingle; rectangular block of carved wood with a handle at each end, the center has 6-14 holes in two rows, with jhyalli cymbals fastened into each hole. 30-60 centimeters wide x 15 centimeters long x 3 centimeters thick. Held in both hands and shaken; accompanies hymns and Bhajan and Kirtan. | | Terai | |
| Kastha kartaala | काण्ठ कर्ताल | Rectangular blocks about 20 cm x 7.5 cm, with jhyaali cymbals mounted in two rows of two holes on each. The blocks are held in each hand (by a fingers-hole in one and a thumbhole in the other) and clapped together. "Played by religious choirs." | | | Kastha Kartaala काण्ठ कर्ताल |
| Khajadaa | खंजडा | Similar to Kastha kartaala. Rectangular blocks about 20 cm x 7 cm, with jhyaali cymbals mounted in two rows of two holes on each. The blocks are held in each hand (by a fingers-hole in one and a thumbhole in the other) and clapped together. Accompany spiritual songs, and during death rituals (and the accompanying music). The tamauraa (a one strinded instrument) can be plucked with the other hand in accompaniment. | Tharu people | | |
| Khanjari | खन्जरी | A jingle held in each hand and shaken. Each is shaped like a ping-pong paddle (or one with the round trimmed to a square), with four slots in the circular part and jhaali mounted in the slots. about 20 cm long x 12 cm at the widest part. Used by religious choirs. | | Terai | |
| Patpate | पटपटे | An idophone percussion instrument, a type of clapper. It is called patpate from the "pat pat" sound it makes when swinging it. There it is made of a split banana stalk, or the leaves. The edges of the leaves are cut away to leave the stiff middle stalk-section. The 20 cm long stalk is split into three sections (each about 12 cm long), leaving a handle about 8 cm long. The instrument or toy is about 5 cm wide. | | | Indian version, called thattai |
| Silimi | सिलिमी | A jingle, made by placing 12 rings lining the sides of a flat elongated shape made of iron, with four more rings under the lower grip. The silimi is used while dancing, played by shaking it with the dance moves. This is a traditional musical instrument of the Rai Limbu people. | Kirat community: Limbu people, Rai people | | Jingle played in 2013 Udhauli festival. |

== Chordophones ==
| Name in English | Name in Nepali | Description | Ethnic Connections | Town / Region | Picture |
|---|---|---|---|---|---|
| Aarbajo | आरबाजो | Plucked lute. Very similar to other Asian lutes including Dramyen of Tibet, Pamiri rubab of East Tajikistan, dranyen of Bhutan, and the rubab of Tashkent. These instruments all have the hollow going from the bowl up into the neck, extensions outward from the neck (just above the bowl). | Gandarbha | | Re-creation of the Aarbajo. The instrument is being held like a guitar or dramyen. The traditional way is to set it vertically in the lap. |
| Dakkari | डक्कारी | It is a fiddle about 45 centimeters long (about 17 inches), carved from a single piece of wood, with two sound chambers covered with goatskin.[1] The instrument has six strings on it. The bow is made with hair from horse tail dipped into pine tar or rubbed with rosin. | | Terrai area, Janakpur zone | |
| Dhodro Banam | | Sometimes known as the santali banam. 2-chambered, bowed string instrument made of Guloic wood, with animal skin soundboard. Played to accompany courtship and ritual dances, dhodron banam are frequently sculpted to depict important scenes and motifs from Santāl life and mythology. | Santal people | Northeastern Region | Dhodro banam, 19th century. |
| Ḍōṅmēna or Dongmen | डोङ्मेन | 6-8 string lute, related to tungna about 78–90 cm long, carved shardul as part of peghead. Accompanies folk dances. A shardul is a mythical creature, part lion and part something else (such as goat, sheep, bird, horse). | Sherpas | eastern Himalayas | |
| Golki | गोल् | Name is used for two one-string instruments. One version is a drum-zither or zither-drum called "golki" in Nepal. In India, it is called Ektara एकतारे. The Nepalese use "ektara" for a different instrument. The golki can be drummed or it can have the strings plucked. By squeezing the bamboo lathes, the tone can be shifted. | | | |
| Ektara | एकतारे | The ektara in Nepal is a one-string lute, played in a rhythmic drone. It is used by Yogis and wandering holy men to accompany their singing and prayers. Bamboo stick (90 cm long) is inserted through side of wooden bowl (a "tumbo") and the top of the bowl is covered with deerskin. Has a single string running from a peg at the top, down the stick/neck, across a bridge on the deerhide soundboard, and is tied at the "spike" where the stick pokes through the bowl. The instrument's string is plucked with the index-finger's fingernail. | | | |
| Piwancha | | Erhu-style fiddle, 2-strings, extinct but being revived. | | | |
| Name in English | Name in Nepali | Description | Ethnic Connections | Town / Region | Picture |
| Sarangi (Nepali) | सारङ्गी | Four-stringed fiddle, similar to Indian Sarangi. | | | Nepali sarangi |
| Tamaura | तमौरा | One-string lute with (possibly) coconut resonator, similar to Urni. | | | |
| Tungana or Tungna | टुङ्ना | Lute, four strings (one pair and two individual strings), plucked with plectrum. Overall length of 75 cm (about 29 inches). Sheepskin soundboard. Carving of a shardul on peghead. Accompanies singing, dancing. A shardul is a mythical creature, part lion and part something else (such as goat, sheep, bird, horse). Variations: Hyolmo Tungnaa. Hyolmo people, Sindhupalchok district. 4 strings, 70 cm long, goatskin soundboard, shardul carved on peghead, plucked with plectrum to play rhythm.; Tamang tungna. Tamang people, Sailoong area, Ramechhap district, Kavre district and Dolakha district. 4 strings, 75 cm long, goatskin soundboard, ghodaa (horse's head) carved on peghead, plucked with plectrum to play rhythm.; Dhamaken. Thakali people. 4 strings (but 3 or 5 possible), 70 cm long, skin soundboard, shardul carved on peghead, plucked with plectrum. Outer 2 strings tuned to high pitch and low pitch; 2 center strings tuned to same pitch.; Hyanjing. Bhote people. Himalayas. 8 silk strings, 70 cm long, sheepskin soundboard, a sheep's head or shardul carved on peghead, plucked with plectrum to play rhythm and melody. | | Himalayan area | Tamang tungna |
| Urni | उर्नी | One-string fiddle. A coconut resonator impaled by a stick (which acts as the instrument's neck. String runs from the top of the neck down along the stick, over the skin soundboard, and is fastened below the coconut resonator. Played with a bow. | Dhimal | Eastern Himalaya | Urni, cropped from an 1820 image |
| Yakuchaa babhu | याकुचा बभु | A piece of bamboo tube (15–20 cm tall x 15–18 cm diameter) is covered at one end with goatskin, to form a drum-like object. The drumhead is pierced in the center and a string run through the hole. One end of the string is wrapped around a rod, to keep it from coming out of the hole. The other end is held in the musician's hand. To play, the body is held under the arm, while that same arm pulls the string tight. The other hand plucks the string. The instrument is similar to the Anandalahari of Bengal, Gubguba and Khamak (of Bengal, Odisha and North East India, especially Baulgaan). Played in festivals and dances. | Newar | Kathmandu Valley | Anandalahari. The yakuchaa babhu would have the string coming out from the top of the membrane, instead of having it pass through the instrument's body. |

=== Tube zithers and raft zithers ===
- Bhante Maadal. 2-String bamboo drum zither.
- Tunjaai. Tube zithers connected together into a single instrument, a raft zither, hanging from the shoulder and plucked with a plectrum. Made from Thysanolaena maxima.
- Yalambar (यलम्बर) / Yalamber Baja (tube zither-drum) यलम्बर (बाजा)

== Aerophones ==
=== Trumpets ===
| Name in English | Name in Nepali | Description | Ethnic Connections | Town / Region | Picture |
|---|---|---|---|---|---|
| Bheri | भेरी | Copper trumpet, resembles bugle. 53 cm long. Played at festivals, at "occasions of special worship", and at Nuwakot Palace in worship to goddess Bhairavi. | | | |
| Baano | बानो | A trumpet, with a bend about mid-way down its length. The end may be split to resemble a mouth. | | | |
| Kangling or Kaangling or Rkang-gling (Tibet) | काङलिङ् | A trumpet or horn made out of a human tibia or femur. | | | |
| Annapurna karnal or karnal | कर्नाल | Copper trumpet, part of Panche baja. About 180 centimeters long. | Damai of Western Nepal | | |
| Kalasha Karnāl | | Copper trumpet, part of Panche baja. 200 centimeters long. Similar to Annapurna Karnal but with wider cone. | Damai | Eastern Nepal | |
| Hiti Manga | हिटिमँग | A copper trumpet, about 45 centimeters long, decorated with a "Makara" (sea monster or dragon). Depicted monster's open mouth is the bell of the trumpet. Distinct upward pointing snout. | Newar Buddhists | | 19th century version from Tibet. |
| Narasingaa or dhutturi | नरसिंगा or धुत्तुरी | (Also spelling variants नरसिङगा and नरसिङ्गा). Large curved trumpet, almost crescent shaped, similar to Sringa. Made of thin copper sheet worked into tubular sections and assembled. The Folk Instrument Museum in Kathmandu notes two kinds: the narasingaa paschhimeli is made of 5-7 pieces with a length of 200-300 centimeters, and the curve is gradually semi-circular. The narasingaa purbeli is made of 4 parts, totaling about 150 centimeters length, thicker sheet metal, and a higher pitch. | Damai | Paschhimeli-Western Nepal; Purbeli-Kathmandu Valley and the hill areas of the Ramechhap District in Eastern Nepal. | Probable narasingaa purbeli (left) and Kalasha Karnāl horn (right) Narsinga at Hindu wedding ceremony |
| Name in English | Name in Nepali | Description | Ethnic Connections | Town / Region | Picture |
| Ransingha | | Large trumpet with S-curve. Made of thin copper sheet worked into tubular sections and assembled. | | | |
| Sringa | सिङगा | Large curved trumpet, similar to Narsingha. | | | |
| Laawaa or Lava or Labha | लावा | Copper straight trumpet, collapsible in 5 sections, 225-400 centimeters (88-157 inches) when assembled. Sections constructed of thin sheets of copper assembled into tubing. Similar to a Tibetan Radong "brass trumpet" or Dungchen "large trumpet". Played by lamas in monasteries while scripture is recited. Played with Tamang ghyaling (7-hole oboe) and bupsel (small brass cymbals). | Buddhist Sherpa people, Tamang people and Gurung people | | |
| Naagphani or Bijuli bana | नागफनी or बिजुली बाना | A trumpet that is stylized as a serpent, with many tight coils. The mouthpiece is the tip of the snake's tail, its mouth is the trumpet's bell. 63 cm long. Played by yogis at Changu Narayan Temple jatra (festival), as well as at Swargadwari and Gosaikunda. Used in "fanfares" and "temple ensembles." Bijuli bana (lightning instrument), is also called Nag-beli baja (snake instrument नागबेली बाजा). | | | |
| Neku | नेकू | End-blown buffalo horn trumpet. The horn of a domestic water buffalo (Bubalus bubalis) has a hole drilled in the tip. It may be used that way as a trumpet, or a mouthpiece can be attached, such as a 15 centimeter (6 inch) length of bamboo. The player blows through the bamboo like a trumpet. For the Matya Jatra or the Festival of Lights, longer lengths of bamboo are used to create a horn about four-feet long with an upward curve at the end. The buffalo horn forms the bell of the instrument. In the past wild water buffalo horns were used, but the species is now endangered. | Newar people | Lalitpur | |
| Ponga | पोंगा | long straight trumpet, about 40 inches long (100 centimeters) made of copper tubing that gets wider from mouthpiece to bell, supported by a rest made from bamboo. Played during "Daaphaa geet" (religious songs) and during Kathmandu's "Goddess Dance." | Newar | Kathmandu | Behind costumed "Goddess" and drummer, men play pongas, with rests anchored to their bodies. |
| Pung or Pung Sing | पुङ सिङ | Horn trumpet from horn of a Hill Ox (Bos indicus), 35–50 cm long. A hole is made in the tip and the horn is blown through that hole. Used in ceremony for the dead. | Kirat people | Solukhumbu District | |
| Name in English | Name in Nepali | Description | Ethnic Connections | Town / Region | Picture |
| Shankha | शङ्ख | Conch-shell trumpet | | | |
| Shikhar | शिखर | Trumpet, about 90 cm long, with deep U-shaped bend in the middle. Uniform tube until after U-bend, when it widens into a bell. Played in honor of the god, Shiva. Used to communicate between hilltop villages. | Damai | Gorkha District | |
| tiklicha | टिक्लीचा | Goat horn trumpet. The horn of a goat (Capra hircus (longer horns are preferred) is attached to a 50 cm long tube of bamboo tube, with the horn tip cut off and the tip o the horn placed into a hole on the top of the bamoo. | Newar | | |
| Turahi | तुरही | Cowhorn shaped trumpet, 2 arms-lengths long (or possibly about 90 cm), made of a single sheet of thick copper (not made in assembled sections like the narshinga and ranasringa). Instrument had a high pitch and was named for the "tururu" sound it made. | Damai | hills of Central Region and Eastern Region | |

=== Flutes, panpipes ===
| Name in English | Name in Nepali | Description | Ethnic Connections | Town / Region | Picture |
|---|---|---|---|---|---|
| Bansuri | बाँसुरी | A side-blown bamboo flute with six holes. | | | Public performance by Newar musicians with flutes, Lalitpur. |
| Chongwari | चोङ्वारी | Also called a chari baja (चरी बाजा). Pan pipes. | | | |
| Kuku Baya | कुकु वय् | End-blown flute, about the length of a hand about 30 cm, carved from satisaal wood with seven fingerholes and a thumbhole. Played at weddings with the koncha khin. | Jyapu caste | Kathmandu valley | |
| murali | मुरली | A side blown bamboo flute or fife with six holes. Made from nigalo or gobi bamboo, or Bhakkimilo (Chinese sumac) Murali is general word for flute, and the word can also be applied to fife, panpipe, reed pipe, mouth organ, and chamfer. (Words that all came up in Google translate as alternate definitions). | | | Flute salesman in Kathmandu with end blown and transverse bamboo flutes. |
| murali | मुरल | End-blown fipple bamboo flutes include Dhungre murali, Goje murali, Murali and Sipi Bharuwaa murali. | | | End-blown murali with seven sound holes. Athapaharia Rai caste. |

=== Reed instruments ===
| Name in English | Name in Nepali | Description | Ethnic Connections | Town / Region | Picture |
|---|---|---|---|---|---|
| Ghyaling (Tamang ghyaling and Sherpa ghyaling) | | Shawm. Played in "identical pairs" with prayers, and alongside laawaa/radun/dungchen (long trumpets) and bupsel (brass cymbal chimes) when some Buddhist scriptures are read. Tamang version has 7 fingerholes and a thumbhole. Sherpa version has 8 fingerholes and a thumbhole. | | | Tharlam Monastery band plays during Lamdre at Boudha, Kathmandu. |
| Masak or Masak baja | | Single-reed bagpipes. The mashak (also known as mushak baja, masak, mishek, meshek, moshug, moshaq, moshuq, mashak bin, bin baji) is a type of bagpipe found in Northern India, Sudurpaschim Province(specially Baitadi and Darchula district) of Nepal and parts of Pakistan and Afghanistan. The pipe was associated with weddings and festive occasions. In India it is historically found in Garhwal(kumaon) in Uttarakhand, Rajasthan and Uttar Pradesh. This bagpipe uses single reeds, and can be played either as a drone or as a melody instrument. | | | Indian sruti upanga bagpipe. Burmese mashak, with reed pipe similar to Pungi with melody pipe and drone pipe together. |
| muhaali | मुहाल | Reed instruments, two styles.: Straight tubed instruments resembling Indian shehnai include Bhamaraa muhali भमरा मुहाल (7 holes), Gujraati muhali (8 holes) and Rosh muhaali रोशमुहाली (8 holes).; Curved-tube instruments that resemble the Nepali sahane include Kokil Muhaali कोकिल मुहाली (8 holes) and Pujaa muhaali (8 holes). | | | North Indian shehnai. |
| Pungi | पुँगी | Snake-charmer's flute a double reed woodwind with two reed pipes (one a drone) attached to small gourd, a mouth-blown air hole at the top of the gourd. Simpler instrument than the bin; it lacks the bin's holes on the drone pipe, for changing scale. Learners may use this before going on to the bin. If used for snake charming, an additional bamboo rod is attached. | | | Snake charmer with pungi in India. |
| Bin or Bean | बीन | Like the Pungi, a double reed woodwind with two reed pipes (one a drone) attached to small gourd, a mouth-blown air hole at the top of the gourd. The bin's drone pipe has two or three holes to allow it to change notes for changes of scale. | | | Bin. Two holes visible at bottom of drone pipe. |
| Raasaa | | Trumpet or reed pipe (unclear). | | | |
| Sahane | सहनाई | Quadrupal-reed woodwind used in the Panche baja. Also spelled phonetically Sanahī (सनही), Sanai (सनै), sana'ī (सनई), sahanā'ī (शहनाई), or sanā'ī (सनाई). The Nepalese instrument is curved. Imported from Persia (called surnā there), by way of India. Instrument is carved in two halves that are glued together, then further stabilized with rings, and a bell added at the bottom. Musicians use circular breathing to maintain continuous tone. | | | Musician plays a sahane at a wedding. |
| Pipirma | पिपिरिमा | Leaf of tree held at the mouth and blown to create sharp music mostly in rural areas of Nepal. | | | |

== Unidentified ==
- Baya
- Dafali
- Ghangling
- Girnal
- Handiya
- Horel
- Ilambu
- Irlung pipari
- Jhajhar
- Kaha
- Khusyaha
- kumuna
- Lawa
- Paluwa
- Paschima
- Tahinahi
- Tunguna

== See also ==
- Dapha music
- Gai Jatra
- Gunla Bajan
- Kumha Pyakhan dance
- Malshree dhun
- Naumati Baaja
- Newar music
- Panche baja
