= Newar music =

Music of the Newar people of Nepal

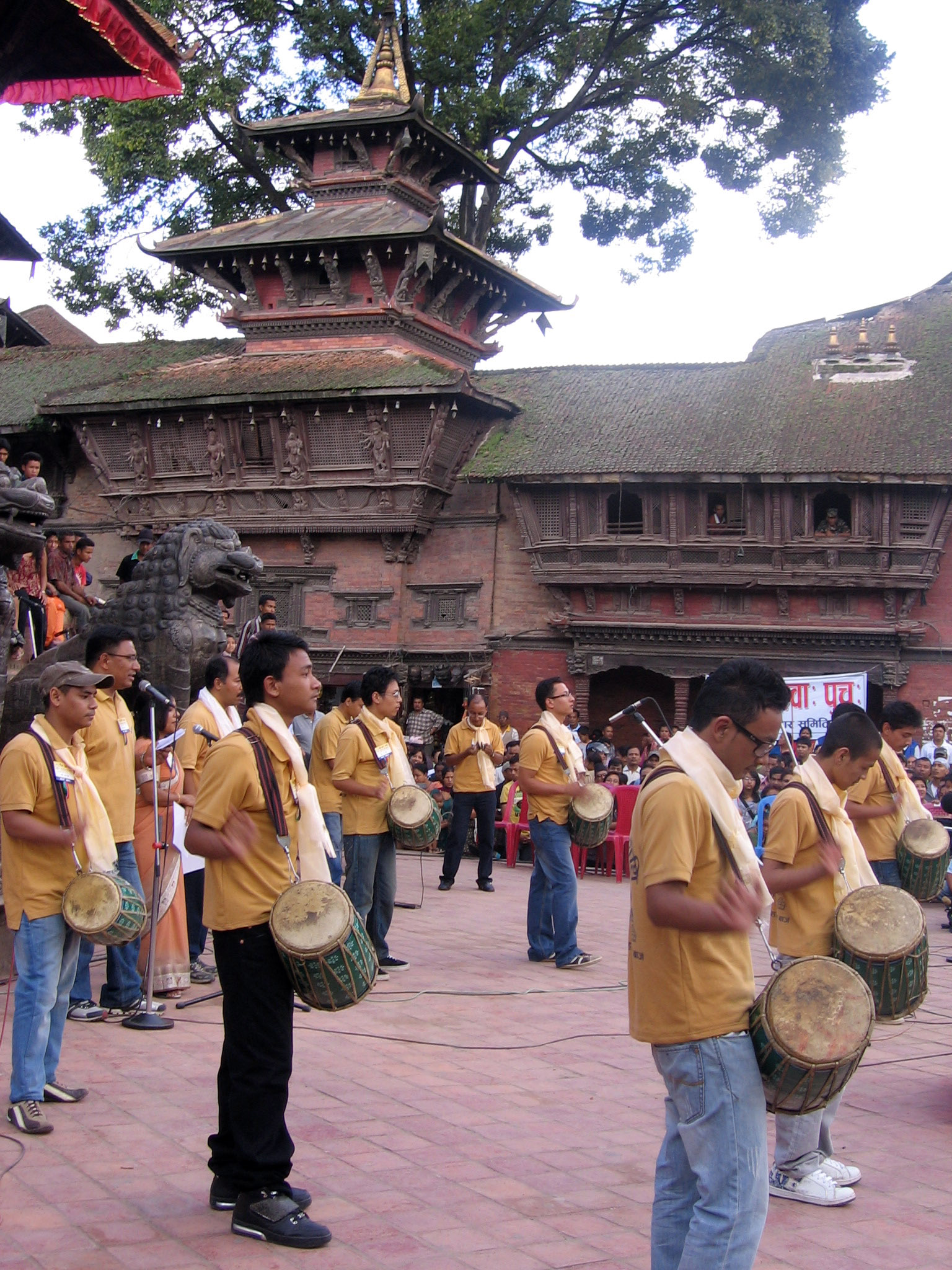
Gunla Bajan performance at Kathmandu Durbar Square.

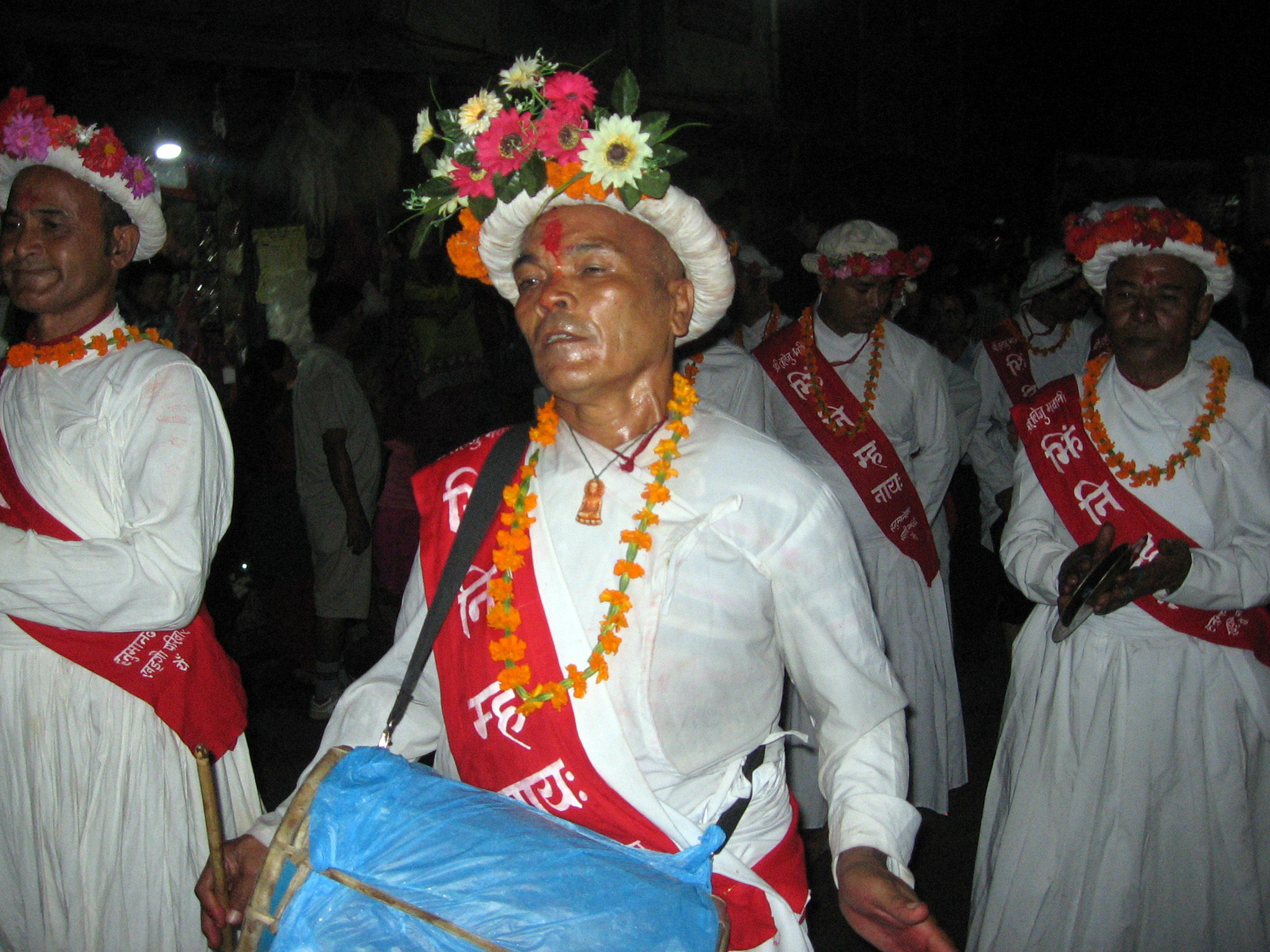
Naykhin musicians lead the chariot procession of Kumari Jatra in Kathmandu.

Newa music, also spelled Newar music, is traditional music developed in Nepal by the Newars. The music has its roots in classic Hindu and Buddhist music. It evolved with incorporation of folk music of the Kathmandu valley and its peripheries. Musical instruments mainly consist of percussion and wind instruments.

== Traditional music ==
Traditional music refers to the music from the 16th century during the rule of King Mahendra Malla to the first decade of the 20th century. Traditional songs consist of hymns that describe various deities, songs about love and marriage, ballads, rice transplantation and historical songs in the form of narratives. The traditional musicians worship the Newar god of music and dance Nasah Dyah.

Traditional Newar music has been arranged into a particular schedule. One of the dominant forms of traditional Newar music is Dapha music. Dapha music is classical Newar music that probably originated during late Lichhavi period and flourished in the Malla period. Basically, the songs of Dapha music are devotional songs based on classical ragas. Dapha music is played by bands known as Dapha Khalah that may be associated with traditional groups called Guthi. According to the ragas, certain songs are played at certain seasons or times of the day. The songs generally narrate or depict the mood of a particular season. Besides the seasonal and scheduled ragas, various ragas are played during specific events, such as Deepak raga (played when a monarch passes away).

Seasons, their festivals and music accompanying them are as follows

Season	Festival	Song	Comments
Grishma (Summer)	Sithinakha to Gathāmuga Chare	Sinājyā	
Barsha (Monsoon)	Gathāmuga Chare to Yanlā Punhi	Tukājyā	
Sharad (Autumn)		Silu mye	
Hemant (Winter)	Dashain (Mohani)	Malshree dhun	Incorporated into mainstream Nepalese music as the music of Dashain
Shishir		Holi mye	
Basant (Spring)	Shree Panchami to Buddha Jayanti	Vasanta	Played to head of state of Nepal at Nasal Chok, Hanuman Dhoka Durbar on Vasant Panchami

The schedule of different ragas played by Dapa on different times of day are as follows-

Rāg	Time of day	Rāg	Time of day
Kola	Midnight to 1 am	Asavari	1 pm to 2 pm
Namāmi	1 am to 2 am	Padmajati	2 pm to 3 pm
Mālawā	2 am to 3 am	Deshā	3 pm to 4 pm
Bihanchuli	3 am to 5 am	Kausi	4 pm to 6 pm
Bhakta	5 am to 7 am	Kedar	6 pm to 7 pm
Jayashree	7 am to 9 am	Wijaya	7 pm to 10 pm
Māluwā	9 am to noon	Wimāsa	10 pm to 11 pm
Bibhaash	Noon to 1 pm	Nāya	11 pm to midnight

== Modern music ==
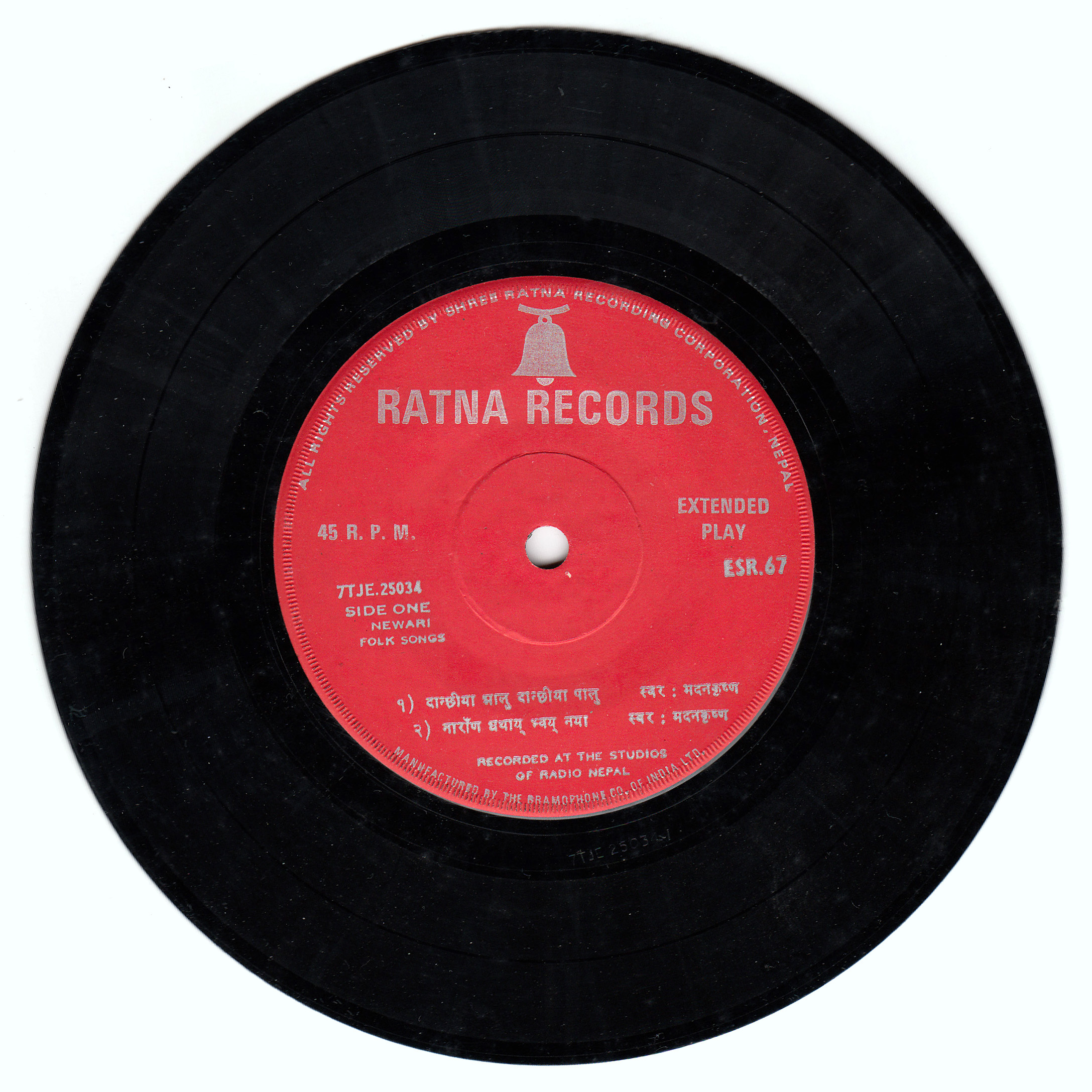
Gramophone record of the song Danchhi ya alu by Madan Krishna Shrestha.

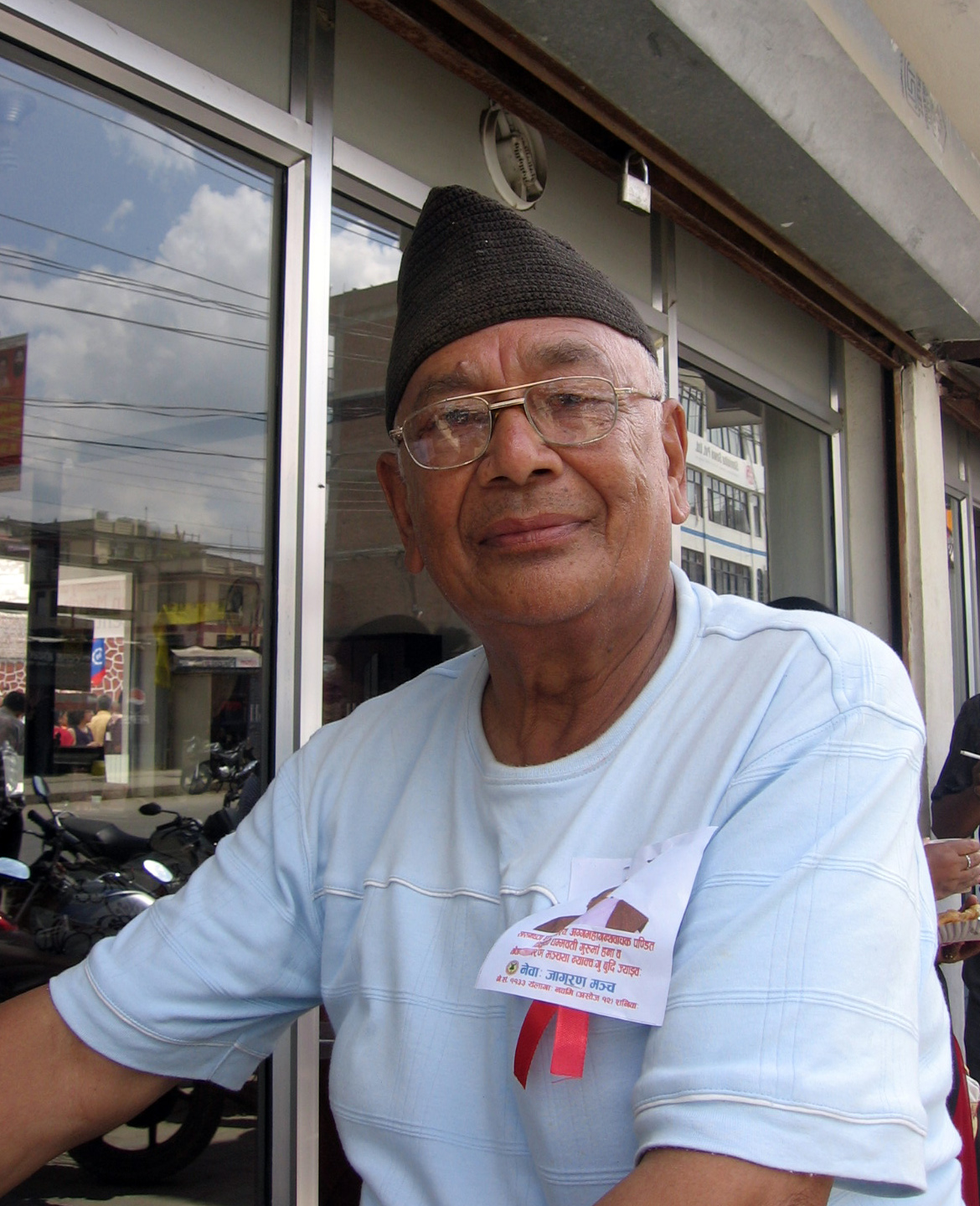
Bhrigu Ram Shrestha is one of the well known names in modern music

Apart from traditional music, there also exists popular music. One of them being Rajamati. Maestro Seturam Shrestha recorded the song first on a gramophone disc in Kolkata in 1908. At the end of 2005, The Lakhey (First Newa Metal Band)(Navras Shrestha) Recorded their First Newari Metal Dhampa tacha.

In contemporary culture, there are numerous pop musicians, lyricists and singers, namely Prem Dhoj Pradhan, Madan Krishna Shrestha, Durga Lal Shrestha and Deepak Bajracharya.

== History ==
According to mythology, Manjushree taught music to his disciples Shantikaracharya and Gunakaracharya. Shantikaracharya taught it to Vandhudatta Vajracharya and Shree Gunadattacharya, who wrote down the teachings to form the basis of classical music of Newars. Also, according to traditional stories, the instrument Paschima was handed down by Lord Krishna and Dhime invented by Lord Mahadeva.

These stories infer that Newa music is primarily derived from the classic Hindu and Buddhist music. Music accompanied most of the traditional epics and plays written in Sanskrit and Nepal Bhasa. This music is based on raga and taal system. The earliest discovered treatise on Newa music is a manuscript called Sangit Chandra Grantha. It was written by King Jagatjyoti Malla of Bhaktapur and his minister Vanshamani Ojha. The manuscript primarily deals with dance, drama and stage play. The text was written in Sanskrit with translations and explanation in Nepal Bhasa. This was followed by another manuscript called Gayanlochan, written by King Jitamitra Malla. Various manuscripts on musical instruments have been found as well. The most famous ones of these are Taal anukaranam, Mridanga Anukaranam, Panchataal baaja.

== Instruments ==
The instruments can be categorized as:

- Membranophones: Dhimay, Paschima, Khin, Kwonchakhin, Damakhin, Dhaa, Nayekhin, Dholak, Nagara, Kantan dab dab
- Chordophones: Piwancha, Sarangi
- Aerophones: Bansuri, Baye, Mwaali, Ponga, Kaahan
- Idiophones: Taa, Babhu, Chhusyaa, Kaynpin, Bhusyaa

== See also ==
- List of Nepali musical instruments
- Malshree dhun
- Dapha music
- Gunla Bajan
- Prajapati Subhash Ram (2000), "Cultural Musical Instruments of Kathmandu Valley". Kathmandu: Newa Dey Daboo (Newars' National Forum)
- Prajapati Subhash Ram (2006), "Pulangu Nepalbhasa Natakya Sangeet Paksya (Musical Aspects of Ancient Nepalbhasa Dramas)". Seattle : newatech, inc.
