= Devotional song =

Hymn that accompanies religious observances and rituals

A devotional song is a hymn that accompanies religious observances and rituals. Traditionally devotional music has been a part of Hindu music, Jewish music, Buddhist music, Islamic music and Christian music.

Each major religion has its own tradition with devotional hymns. In Christianity, the devotional has been a part of the liturgy in Roman Catholicism, Lutheranism, the Greek Orthodox Church, the Russian Orthodox Church, and others, since their earliest days. A devotional is a part of the prayer service proper and is not, in these contexts, ornamentation. Within the Reformed tradition, church music in general was hotly debated; some Puritans objected to all ornament and sought to abolish choirs, hymns, and, inasmuch as liturgy itself was rejected, devotionals.

In Eastern and Near-Eastern religions, devotionals can function as communion prayer and meditation. These are sung in particular rhythms which are sustained over a prolonged period to give practitioners a mystical experience. In Hindu music, the genre arising out of the Bhakti movement (devotion), it takes forms like Bhajan, Kirtan and Aarti.

== Kinds of devotional music ==
- Bhajan: a Hindu or Sikh devotional.
- Kirtan
- Shyama Sangeet
- Borgeet: an Assamese devotional.
- Gunla Bajan
- Dapha music
