= Anandalahari =

Indian musical instrument

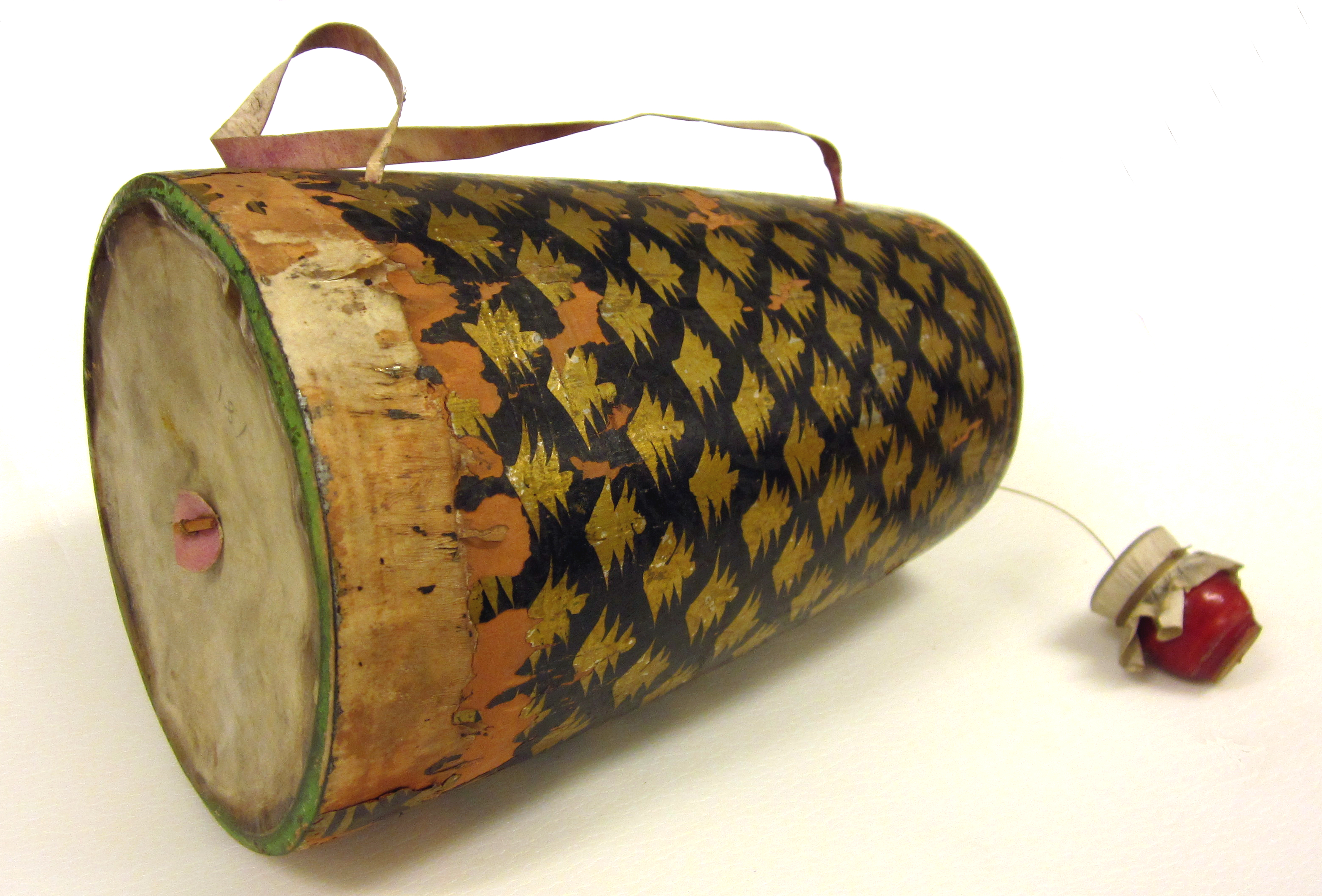
- Other names: gubgubi, khamak
- Classification: Membranophone Chordophone
- Hornbostel–Sachs classification: 22 (barrel shaped body, open on one side, and fixed on the bottom of a string(s))

Related instruments
- Pullavan Kudam, Bhapang, gubgubi, Khamak

The anandalahari (Bengali: আনন্দলহরী; Sanskrit: आनन्दलहरी, romanized: ānandalaharī) is originated in bengal region. The instrument often accompanies dance, and may act as melody and rhythm.

== Name ==
The name anandalahari means "waves of joy". Popularly this instrument is called by onomatopoeic names like gubgubi and khamak.

== Description ==
The anandalahari has a barrel-shaped body, open on one side, and fixed on the "bottom" of a single string. The tool body is wooden, open on both sides; the membrane is fixed in the lower and upper parts with a leather hoop and cords. Some instruments have a hole in the upper diaphragm, others not; it may be completely absent in old instruments. The vein string is attached to the bottom with a piece of bamboo or other material. The other end of the string is fixed inside a copper pot.

== Use ==
The barrel is placed in the left armpit, the pot is taken in the left hand and the string is pulled with it, and the string is played with the right hand using a plectrum.

A similar instrument named pulluvan kudam is found in South India. Another similar instrument known as the gopiyantra kendra is used by the Munda people of Bengal and Odisha. Both the gopiyantra and the anandalahari are used by religious mendicant singers of the Sadhu type and especially by singers of the heterodox Baul faith.

== Classification ==
Curt Sachs believed that the anandalahari and related instruments are a separate class of purely Indian plucked membranophones but ethnomusicologist, Laurence Picken and others have shown that they are clean chordophones.

== See also ==
- Ektara
- Kendara
