= Mere Bane Ki Baat Na Pucho =

Single
- Genre: Qawwali
- Composer: Kamil Hyderabadi

Mere Bane Ki Baat Na Pucho is a Qawwali song. Qawwali is a form of traditional Sufi devotional music popular in South Asia; this particular song is performed in Qawwali concerts, sometimes as a sing-along.
