= Malshree dhun =

Traditional Nepali Music

Malshree
- Medium: Music
- Ancestor arts: Newar devotional music
- Originating culture: Newar
- Originating era: 17th century

Malashree Dhun (Nepal Bhasa: 𑐩𑐵𑐮𑐱𑑂𑐬𑐷 𑐢𑐸𑐣/मालश्री धुन) is a Newar music in which musicians perform devotional instrumental melody, based on indigenous instrumental system. The dhun (instrumental melody ) is incorporated into mainstream Nepalese music as the music of Dashain. It is one of the oldest surviving devotional instrumental music of Nepal, with its origin in the 17th or older century.

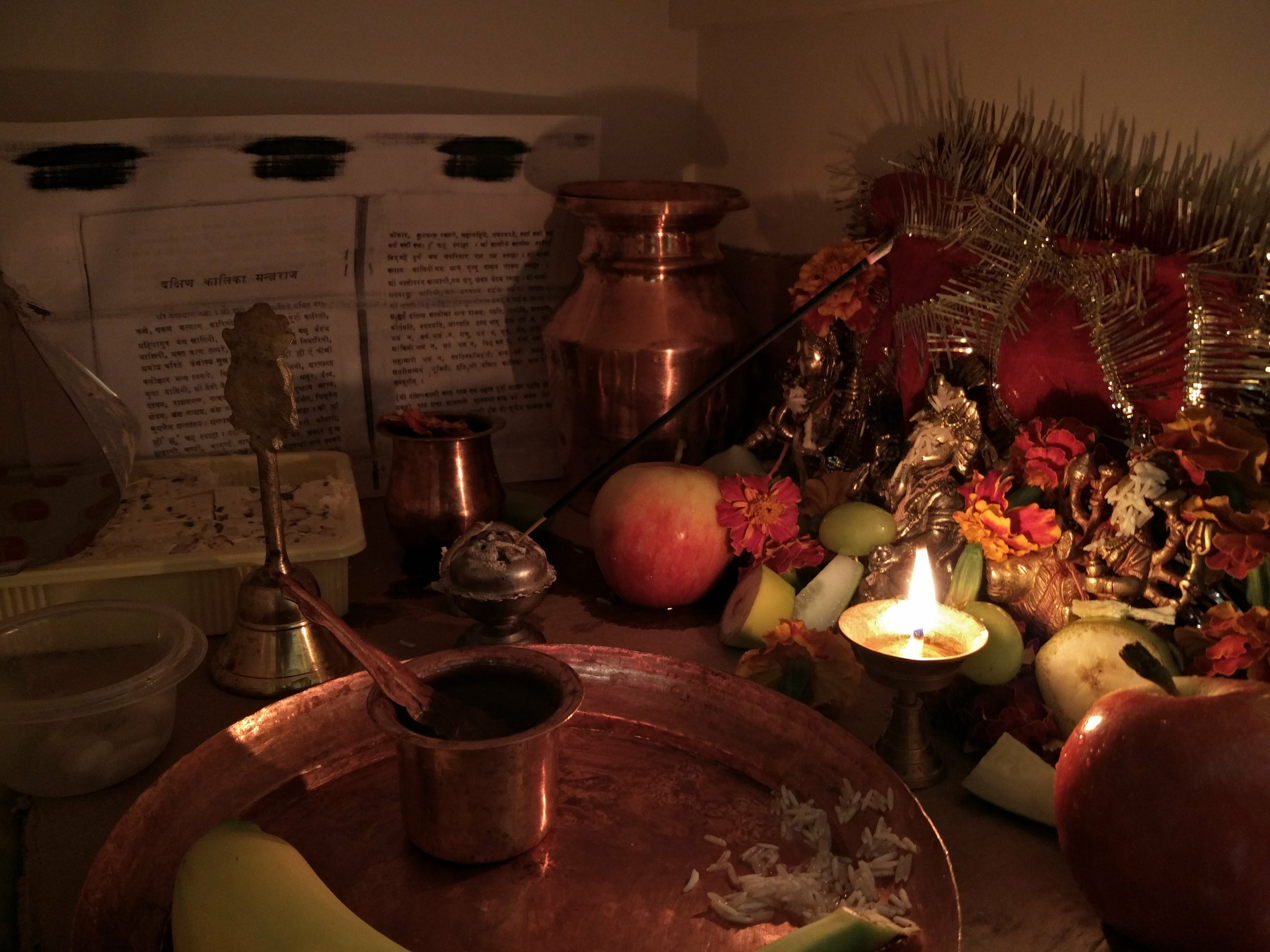
Dashain ritual

== History ==
Classic devotional music has been in existence in Nepal for more than a thousand years. The time period between 11th to 17th century saw an increase in literary activity in Kathmandu. Numerous devotional music, dances, and plays have been found from this era. Most experts believe that the literary development during this era culminated in the development of Newar music form.

The earliest treatise on Malshree dhun found till date is a book in Nepal Bhasa called Sangit Chandra. The book was written as an appendix to Natya Shastra by the Newari Malla king of Bhaktapur, Jagat Jyoti Malla and his ministers. The book elaborates on Bharata Muni's Natya Shastra and Abhinavagupta's Abhinavabharati. This was followed by Gayanlochan, written during the reign of Jitamitra Malla. Gayanlochan focuses more on introduction to raga (and raginis), their characteristics, and performance.

== Performance ==
The sitar, the tabla, the taa and the dhimay are the mainstays of the spiritually uplifting dhun, with some other instruments like the sarangi and flute taking a more subdued role. The composition is related to the Malashree raga. The melody is maintained by the sitar. The Malshree music is performed according to a fixed schedule, which is during the Dashain festival. There are specific pieces of music which are played during the specific season, specific day of the week and specific hours of the day.

Seasons, their festivals and music accompanying them are as follows

Season	Festival	Song	Comments
Grishma (Summer)	Sithinakha to Gathāmuga Chare	Sinjyā	
Barsha (Monsoon)	Gathāmuga Chare to Yanlā Punhi	Tukājyā	
Sharad (Autumn)		Silu mye	
Hemant (Winter)	Dashian (Mohanee)	Mālshree	Incorporated into mainstream Nepalese music as the music of Dashain
Shishir		Holi mye	
Basant	Shree panchami to Buddha Jayanti	Vasanta	Played to Head of state of Nepal in Nasalchowk on Vasant Panchami

== See also ==
- Newar music
- Malashree
- List of Nepali musical instruments
