= Kendara =

Wooden string instrument

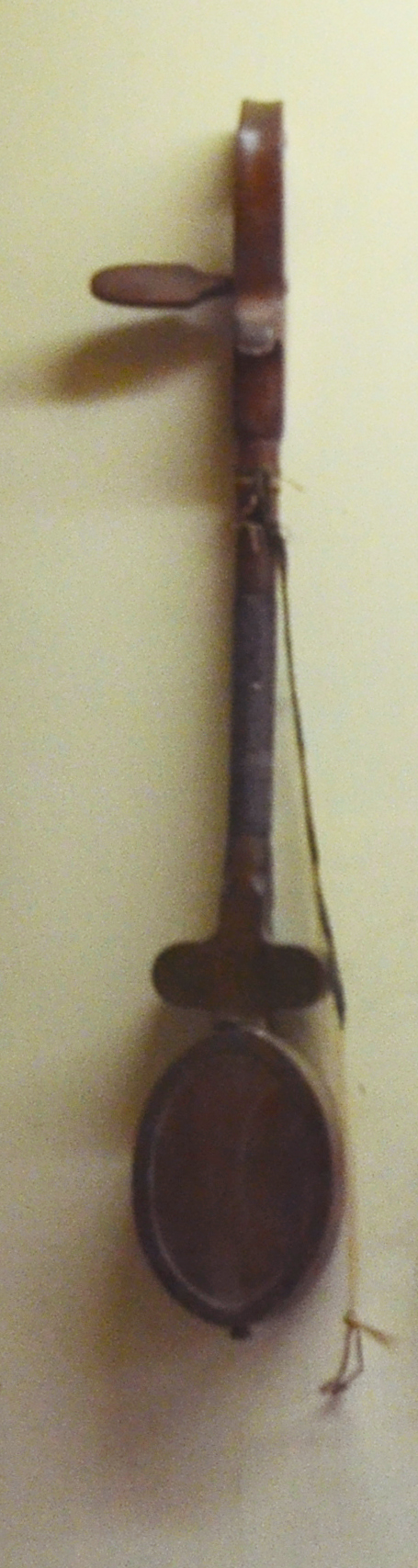
- An old Kendara displayed at Odisha State Museum, Bhubaneswar.

String instrument
- Other names: Kendera
- Hornbostel–Sachs classification: 321.322-71 (Composite chordophone sounded by a bow)

Related instruments
- Khamak; Ektara

A jogi playing Kendara.

The Kendarā ( Odia- କେନ୍ଦରା ) is a wooden string instrument. The kendara has one string and is most commonly played by drawing a bow across its string. They are mostly played traditionally by jogis, people who would go from door to door with a dried gourd container to keep rice, and a kendara to play while singing, and accept food as alms. They are rarely used in genres of folk including country music. The folk genre of music played in a kendara is known as Kendarā Gita ( Odia- କେନ୍ଦରା ଗୀତ ). The instrument rose to popularity during 12th century when Sanskrit was made the official language of the then Utkala Kingdom but the common people did not understand, but the jogis were performing folk songs. Kendara is often tied to Natha (Odia-ନାଥ), a particular sect of the jogis that play the most popular variation of kendara. The other variation is known as Majhi Kendarā ( Odia- ମଝି କେନ୍ଦରା ) and is played by the Santhal people in Odisha.
