= Bhusyah =

Nepalese musical instrument

Bhusyah (Nepal Bhasa: भूस्याः) is a pair of metallic cymbals. Technically, these are idiophones. This instrument is played with Dhimay or other membranophones. Its size ranges from around 10 to 21 inches (25 to 53 cm).

== Festivals ==
Festivals in which Bhusya are played are as follows- Bisket Jatra

- Yenya punhi
- Janamaadya rath jatra
- Bungdya rath jatra
