= Dakkari =

Musical instrument used in Nepal

Dakkari (Nepali: डक्कारी) is a bowed string instrument of Mithila region in Nepal. It is a fiddle about 45 centimeters long (about 17 inches), carved from a single piece of wood, with two sound chambers covered with goatskin. The instrument has six strings on it. The bow is made with hair from horse tail dipped into pine tar or rubbed with rosin.

The instrument is played by the Domra caste in Teraai, Janakpur Zone. The musicians play annually at the Bibaaha Panchami festival in December at the Goddess Janaki's temple in Janakpur. Janaki and Sita are names for the same goddess. Another tradition had the musicians playing door to door for gifts, singing and playing the Ramayana and its tragedy of Sita.

== See also ==
- List of Nepali musical instruments
