= Hindu spiritual music =

Hindu art form

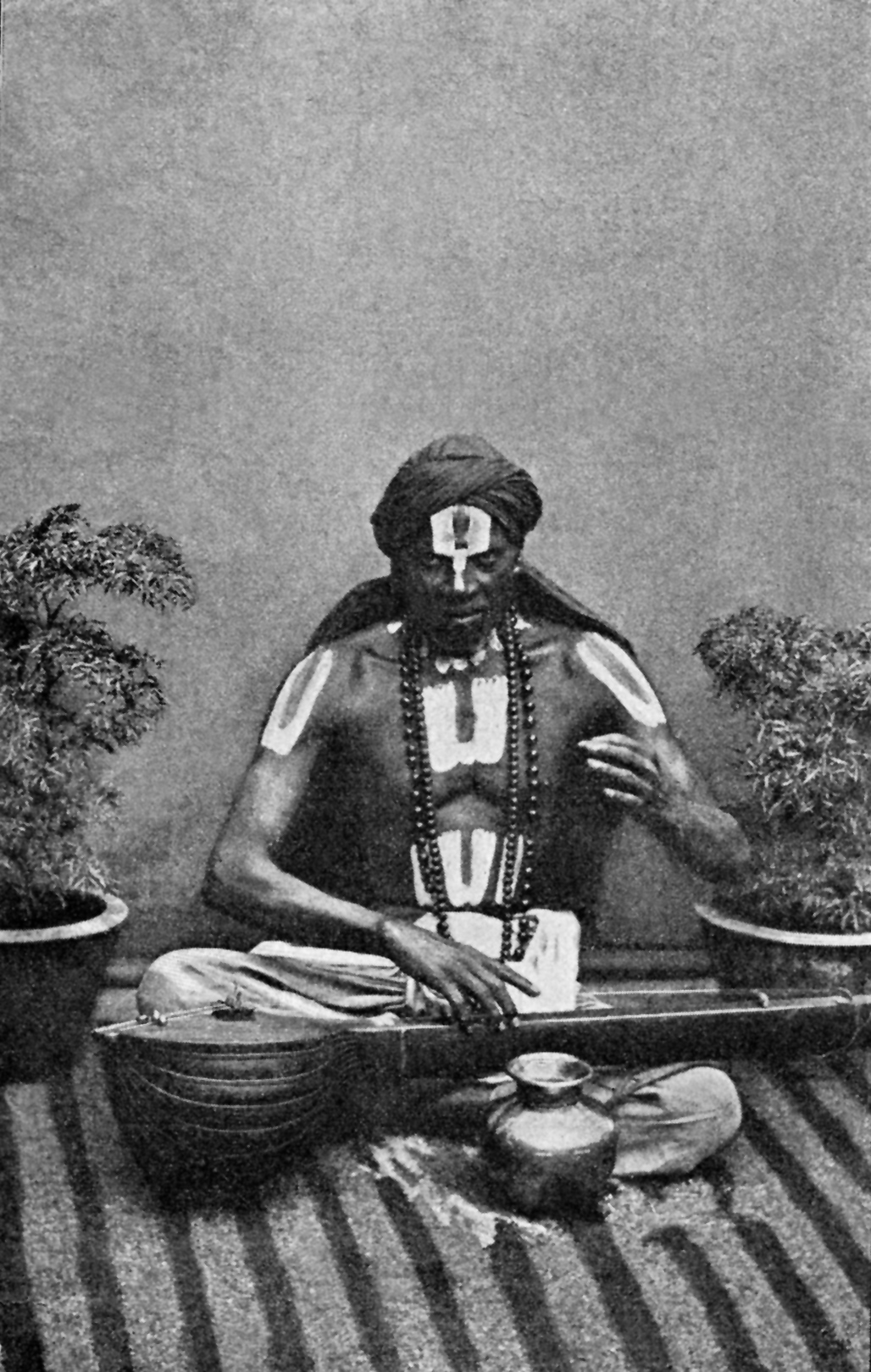
A Hindu musician, early 20th century.

Hindu spiritual music is music associated with Hindu devotion and religious practice. Its devotional forms include bhajan and kirtan. A bhajan is a Hindu devotional song, often using lyrical language to express love for the Divine and commonly sung with bhakti, or loving devotion. Kirtan is a communal devotional practice involving call-and-response chanting of mantras, often accompanied by instruments and dance.

Hindu traditions also connect music with Indian classical music and sacred texts. The origins of Indian classical music are associated with the Vedas, and the Samaveda, one of the four Vedas, discusses music at length. Hindu devotional music has also been associated with musician-saints and poet-saints; Mirabai, for example, composed devotional kirtans addressed to Krishna.

== Bhajan ==
A bhajan is a Hindu devotional song, often of ancient origin. Bhajans are often simple songs in lyrical language expressing emotions of love for the Divine, whether for a single God and Goddess, or any number of divinities. Acts which are done for the God is called bhajan.

== Hindu Bhakti poets ==
Ravidas: a 14th-century bhakti poet from Varanasi, whose verses argued that a person's social rank at birth does not decide their standing before God.

Mirabai: a Rajput princess and 15th-century Hindu poet whose devotional kirtans are addressed to Krishna.

Narsinh Mehta: a 15th-century Hindu poet who composed devotional kirtans addressed to Krishna and is honored with the title Adi Kavi, marking his place at the beginning of Gujarati poetic tradition. His bhajan "Vaishnava Jana To" was a particular favorite of Mahatma Gandhi.

Tulsidas: a Vaishnavite Hindu poet whose compositions are addressed to Rama. He authored the Ramcharitmanas, an Awadhi retelling of the Ramayana, which popularized devotion to Rama in northern India.

Surdas: a 16th-century Hindu poet from North India who composed devotional songs to Krishna in the Brajbhasa language.

== Kirtan ==
A kirtan is a devotional practice in which a deity is praised and celebrated. This is the communal, call-and-response chanting of mantras, often with instruments and dance. Kirtans are folksongs with each region of India containing its rich variety of kirtan.

== Indian classical music ==
The origins of Indian classical music can be found from the oldest of scriptures, part of the Hindu tradition, the Vedas. Samaveda, one of the four Vedas, describes music at length.

== See also ==
- Hindu art
- Music of India
