= Raute people =

Hari tribe of Nepal

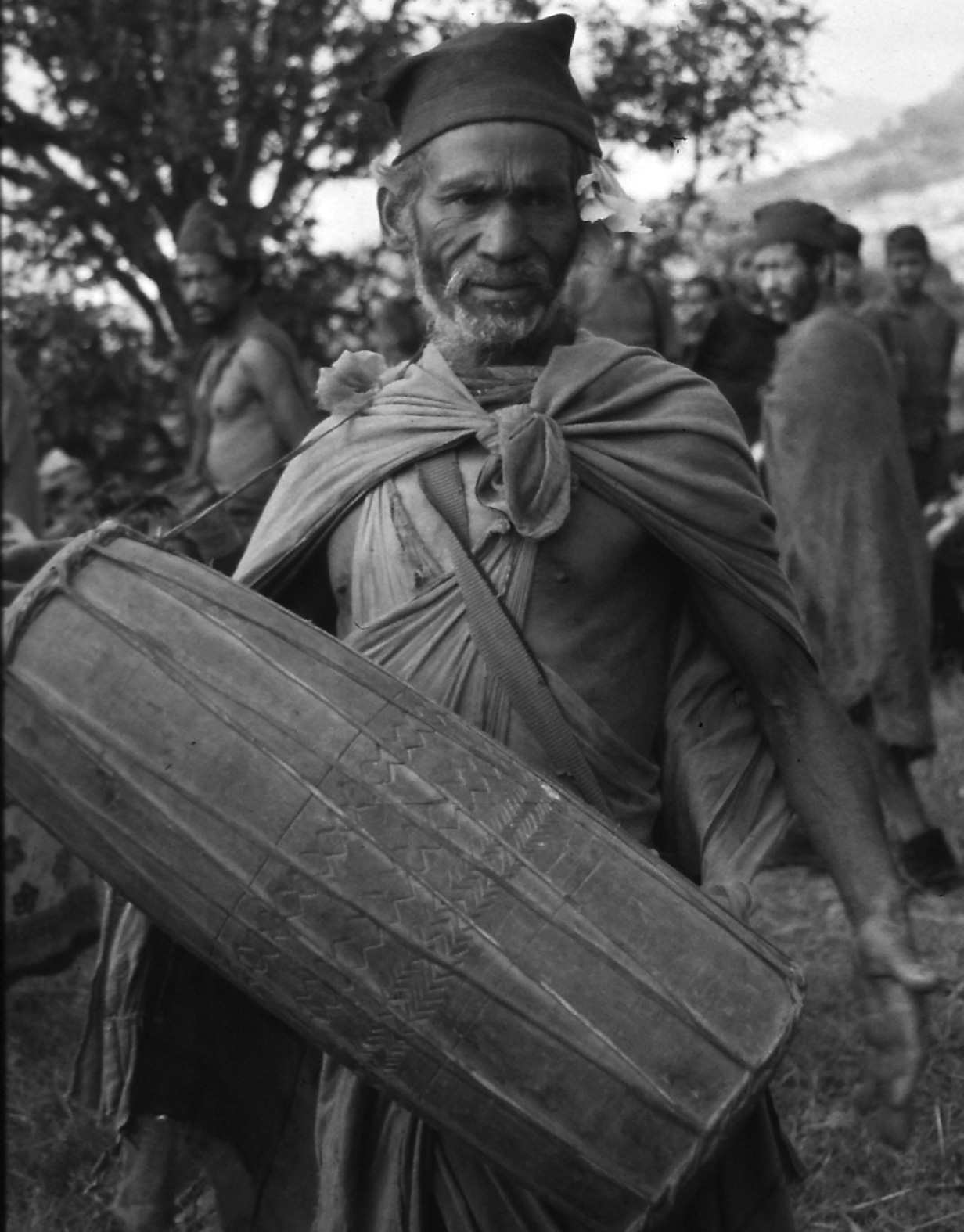
Raute elder drums at public dance in Jajarkot District, Nepal. Photo: J. Fortier

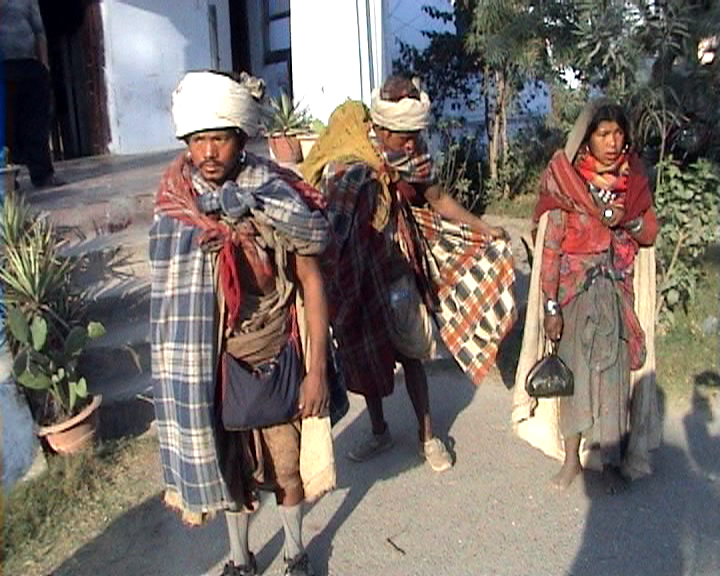
Raute people

Raute are a nomadic ethnic group officially recognized by the Government of Nepal. They are known for subsistence hunting of langur and macaque monkeys. They gather wild forest tubers, fruits, and greens on a regular basis. To obtain grain (rice), iron, cloth, and jewelry, they carve wooden bowls and boxes to trade for goods from local farmers. They do not sell other forest products, bushmeat, or forest medicinal plants. Raute do not share their language, hunting strategies and worship practices with sedentary villagers, in order to maintain their cultural purity. These days, they accept gifts and allowances from the government and non-government organizations on a regular basis.

Their population is estimated at 650, with 618 in Nepal's 2011 census, people living in small settlements in the regions of western Nepal. Most have been forcibly settled by the government of Nepal but there are about 150 nomadic Raute, who, as late as 2016, still chose to live a nomadic life. The government of Nepal has permitted them to cut down small trees in state - run forests needed for poles in erecting their tents, which often puts them in friction with the local population. The Raute move from place to place, spending no more than 4 to 5 months at one place at a time, and often no more than a few days, in search of better water sources, or of villages where they can sell their wood products for food staples.

The Raute language is called "Raute" in most studies and sometimes "Khamci," meaning "our talk" in a few other studies. It is closely related to the language spoken by two related ethnic groups, the Ban Raji ("Little Rulers of the Forest") and Raji ("Little Rulers") of the same region (Fortier and Rastogi 2004).

== Founding principles ==
The Raute people emphasize that their continued existence is based on three principles:

- Remaining nomadic
- Continuing their own native culture, language, and education
- Remaining hunter-gatherers

== Demographics ==
The Central Bureau of Statistics of Nepal classifies the Raute as a subgroup within the broader social group of Mountain/Hill Janajati. At the time of the 2011 Nepal census, 618 people (0.0% of the population of Nepal) were Raute. The frequency of Raute people by province was as follows:

- Sudurpashchim Province (0.0%)
- Koshi Province (0.0%)
- Karnali Province (0.0%)
- Madhesh Province (0.0%)
- Bagmati Province (0.0%)
- Gandaki Province (0.0%)
- Lumbini Province (0.0%)

The frequency of Raute people was higher than national average (0.0%) in one district only:

- Dadeldhura (0.2%)

== Sources ==
- Bista, Dor Bahadur 1978 Encounter with the Raute: Last Hunting Nomads of Nepal. Kailash 4(4):317-327.
- Fortier, Jana 2019 A Comparative Dictionary of Raute and Rawat: Tibeto-Burman Languages of the Central Himalayas. Cambridge, Mass.: Harvard Univ. Press.
- Fortier, Jana 2009 Kings of the Forest: The Cultural Resilience of Himalayan Hunter-Gatherers. Honolulu: Univ. of Hawai'i Press (232pp);
- Fortier, Jana 2003 Reflections on Raute Identity. Studies in Nepalese History and Society.;
- Fortier, Jana, and Kavita Rastogi 2004 Sister Languages? Comparative Phonology of Two Linguistics 21:42-52.;
- Reinhard, Johan 1974 The Raute: Notes on a Nomadic Hunting and Gathering Tribe of Nepal. Kailash, A Journal of Himalayan Studies 2(4): 233-271, Kathmandu.
- Singh, Nanda Bahadur 1997 The Endangered Raute Tribe: Ethnobiology and Biodiversity. Kathmandu: Global Research Carrel for Ethnobiology --
- Shahu, Man Bahadur (2011). "Bhramansil Rāute ko jātiya pahichan ra jātiya paribartan [Ethnic Identity and Change of nomadic Raute]". Pragayā. 105 (1). Nepal Academy: 106–114.
- Shahu, Man Bahadur (2019). "Reciprocity practices of nomadic hunter-gatherer Rāute of Nepal". Hunter Gatherer Research. 4 (2). Liverpool University Press: 257–285.
