= Khamak =

String instrument close to ektara

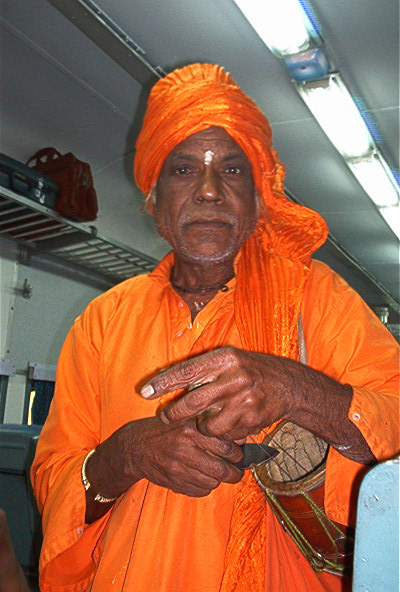
A baul playing a khamak.

The Khamak is a string instrument similar to the Gubguba or Anandalahari, originating in bengal region, common in folk music of Bengal, Odisha and North East India, especially Baulgaan. It is a one-headed drum with a string attached to it which is plucked. The only difference from ektara is that no bamboo is used to stretch the string, which is held by one hand, while being plucked by another. In Anandalahari, the other end of the string is fixed inside a copper pot only.

== Characteristics and use ==
The khamak consists of three basic parts. A bowl which is often made out of wood is connected by several strings to another, smaller piece (also usually made out of wood). The bowl is held under the arm holding the smaller piece in the hand of same arm. Finally, the string are plucked by the other hand while adjusting the tension of strings creating the desired sound. It is generally used in Bengali boul (folk) songs. It is one of the most ancient string instruments in eastern India.

== See also ==
- Ektara
- Tumbi
- Anandalahari
- List of Nepali musical instruments, entry for Yakuchaa babhu.
