= Dhimay =

Traditional drum of Newar community

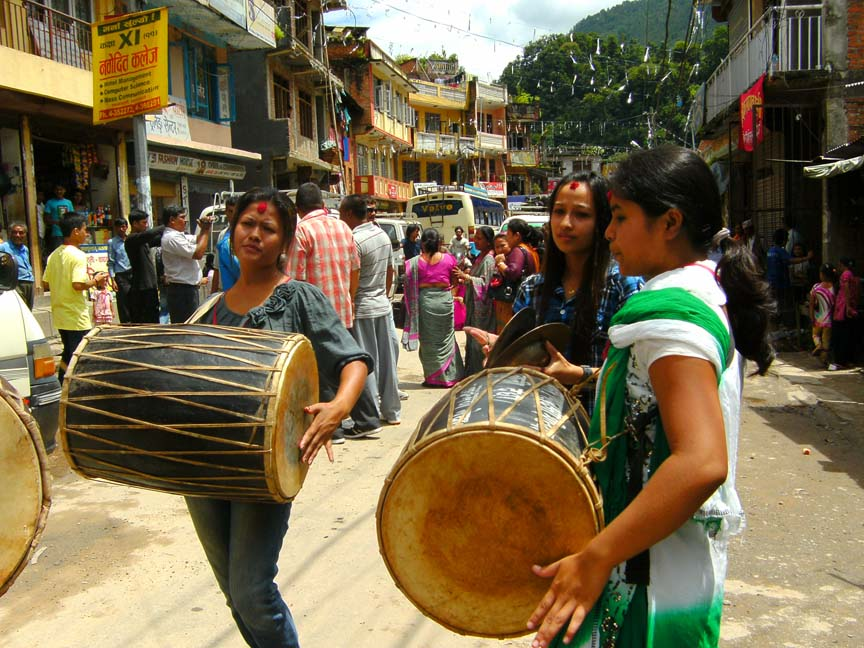
- Other names: धिमय्
- Classification: Membranophone

Related instruments
- Khin

More articles or information
- Newa music

Dhimay, Dhimaya (Newar: धिमय्) or Dhime is a traditional Nepalese drum of the Newar people. According to the Hornbostel–Sachs classification, it belongs to the category of double-headed cylindrical membranophone.

== Description ==
The drum is rather big compared to other drums played by the Newars in Nepal. The size of this instrument varies from diameter of 40 inches to 51 inches and length of 17 inches to 21 inches. The shell of the drum is made of wood or metal. Sometimes wooden drums are partly covered with metal foil. The shape of old Dhimay drums is mostly irregular, formed by the natural shape of the piece of wood being used to make the drum body. Modern drums are either cylindrical or slightly barrel-shaped. Both heads are made of goat skin. On the inside of the left membrane, called Mankhah (Haima in Bhaktapur) a red tuning paste (similar in function to the Syahi) is applied, providing a deep sound.

There are two kinds of dhimay. The smaller ones are called "Dhaacha Dhimay" and bigger dhimay are called "Ma Dhimay"

== Playing technique ==
The left side (Mankhah) is played directly by hand playing either at the upper part of the membrane (ghe), producing a long resonating sound, or a downward stroke (kha), producing a sharp crisp sound. The right membrane, called Nasah, is played with a thin stick, made of cane, which is normally curved at one end. In addition to this three basic strokes a fourth type of stroke (dha) is played, combining the low resonating sound of the left hand i.e. on upper part and the stroke of the right hand.

== History ==
According to local legends, the instrument is believed to be invented by Mahadev. The drum has been played since the Kirata kingdom. The drum is played mostly by Jyapu community; the Jyapu community are Newars whose occupation is farming. However, other castes also play it as Nepal is developing into a unified nation where all castes can play any cultural instruments.

== Performance ==
In traditional context Dhimay is played together with other instruments, mostly idiophones of different types, depending on the local tradition. In Dhimay-ensembles, called Dhimaybaja, the drum is accompanied by cymbals like Bhuchhyay, Sichhyay, and sometimes by Tai-nai, a gong-like instrument. At special occasions even the shawm musicians of the Kapali (hon.) or Jugi (coll.), a caste of tailors and professional musicians, may be called. The Dhimay is also played in the Buddhist Navabaja (or Naubaja)-Ensembles. Recently, with musicians looking for new ways to develop popular music with its roots in traditional music, the Dhimay is played as a sort of bass drum, accompanying western instruments like guitar.

== Occasions ==
The Dhimay is played at major religious festivals and rituals (Jatra, Puja):

- Deshwodhar Puja Devpatan - Chaitra Krishna Dwadashi
- Janabahaadya chariot festival
- Bunga Dyah Jatra chariot festival
- Indra Jatra
- New year of Nepal Sambat (Bhintuna)
- Bisket Jatra
- Pujas for deities like Krishna, Ganesha
- Paha Chare
- Gun Punhi (Gai jatra)
- Gunla (month in Nepal sambat: it occurs just before Yela)
- Yela (month in Nepal sambat: it starts from Aunshi to Ghatsthapana)

It is played at family festivities and life-cycle rituals:

- Janko
- Kaeta puja
- Ihi Paa

Dhimay is also played at inaugurations, rallies, receptions, cultural shows and competitions.
