= Laurence Picken =

Laurence Ernest Rowland Picken (16 July 1909 – 16 March 2007) was an ethnomusicologist and scientist. He had a wide research interest, and published works on cytology, biochemistry, musicology, Turkish musical instruments, and ancient Chinese and Japanese music.

== Life and career ==
Laurence Picken was born in Nottingham to Ernest Frederick Picken and Rosa Louisa Bevan. He studied at Waverley Road Secondary School, Birmingham. In 1928 he won a scholarship to Trinity College, Cambridge, where he graduated with a double first in natural sciences. His PhD, in 1935, was in zoology. He obtained a two-year Rockefeller Studentship to work at the École de Chimie, University of Geneva, studying the thermoelastic properties of living muscle and long-chain polymers using X-ray crystallography. He also obtained a Francis Maitland Balfour Studentship at the Department of Zoology, Cambridge to study long-chain molecules and their effect of on cell shape, and in the summer he studied freshwater ciliates in Lake Ohrid in Yugoslavia. He returned to England when the Second World War broke out, and while he was in charge of a blood transfusion unit during the war, he refined the methods for filtration and drying of plasma.

In 1944 he became a Fellow at Jesus College. Between 1946 and 1966 he was assistant director of research in zoology at the university. He was made a fellow of the Institute of Biology, was a visiting professor at the University of Washington in 1959, and received the Trail Award from the Linnean Society in 1960 for his work on microscopy. Among the publications he wrote was The Organization of Cells and Other Organisms in 1960.

In 1944, Picken produced his first musicological work, Bach quotations from the eighteenth century. In 1944, he also revived his interest in Chinese music which he had since the 1930s, and started to research in traditional Chinese music, an interest he conducted in parallel with his career in zoology. He joined Joseph Needham on his research mission to Chongqing in late 1943 as a biophysicist and agricultural advisor. While there he learned to play and eventually mastered the Chinese music instrument guqin, a 7 string zither. In the autumn of 1945 he sent the British Council a highly critical memorandum of Needham's actions in China. In his memorandum, Picken criticized Needham's hiring of his mistresses and taking unnecessary trips. He wrote about Needham's trip to Xi'an: "If he had a cast iron excuse for going there he could fly in three hours, but his God complex is titillated by going by truck. And so he goes that way, spending several weeks in the journey and I don' know how much money". In response, Needham wrote a formal assessment of Picken where he included this characterization: "a more unfriendly and disagreeable colleague I never hope to meet."

In the 1950s, Picken wrote articles on Chinese and Japanese music for Grove's Dictionary and the New Oxford History of Music, and edited the Journal of the International Folk Music Council. He also edited an occasional periodical Musica Asiatica. His many publications show his broad ethnomusicological interests, including a book on instrument studies and music of Turkey. In 1981, he started a 25-volume project Music from the Tang Court, a study on Tang dynasty music preserved in the Japanese Togaku tradition, but the project was not completed by the time of his death with only 7 volumes published. The interpretations of Japanese collections of Tang music by Picken and his students drew criticisms from some Japanese academics, although they have since received some gradual but not complete acceptance. He became involved in the beginning of the Ancient Asian Music Project at the Library of Congress in 1997.

Between 1966 and 1976 he was assistant director at the Faculty of Oriental Studies at Cambridge University. He was elected to a high number of academic positions, amongst them are: Fellow of the British Academy (1973) and Docteur Honoris Causa of the Université de Paris X, Nanterre (1988). Two Festschriften, commemorating his 60th and 70th birthday, were published, an indication of his esteem amongst scholars. Some of his papers and his library can be found at the Cambridge University Library.

According to an obituary in The Times Picken was 'accomplished to such a degree that few even in the university could appreciate the range of his achievements in fields that were united in him as in no one else.'

== Works ==
- The Organization of Cells and Other Organisms. Oxford University Press, 1960
- Folk Musical Instruments of Turkey. Oxford University Press, London 1975
- Musica Asiatica. 1: 1977, Vol. 2: 1979, Vol. 3, 1981, Vol. 4: 1984, Vol. 5: 1988, Vol. 6: 1991
- Music from the Tang Court. Vol. 1: 1981, Vol. 3: 1985, Vol. 5: 1990, Vol. 6: 2007, Vol. 7: 2006, Oxford University Press, London

== Festschriften ==
- Asian Music, vi/1–2, 1975, edited by F.A. Kuttner and F. Lieberman (Festschrift for Picken's 60th birthday)
- Music and Tradition: Essays on Asian and other Musics presented to Laurence Picken, edited by D.R. Widdess and R.F. Wolpert, Cambridge: Cambridge University Press 1981.
