= Dapha music =

Dapha
- Medium: Music
- Ancestor arts: Newa devotional music
- Descendant arts: Bhajan Khala
- Originating culture: Newa
- Originating era: 17th century

Dapha music (Nepal Bhasa: दाफा) is a Newa artform in which singers and musicians perform devotional music, based on classical raga and taal system. The music is performed by a group of musicians called Dapha khalah in places called dabu. Dapha is the oldest surviving devotional music of Nepal, with its origin in the 17th century. The dapha music saw a growth in the early 18th century with royal patronage. It expanded during that era to include sets of nine different drums that are standard today.

== History ==
Classic devotional music has been in existence in Nepal for more than a thousand years. The time period between 11th to 17th century saw an increase in literary activity in Kathmandu. Numerous devotional music, dances, and plays have been found from this era. Most experts believe that the literary development during this era culminated in the development of Dapha music form.

The earliest treatise on dapha found till date is a book in Nepal Bhasa called Sangit Chandra. The book was written as an appendix to Natya Shastra by the king of Bhaktapur Jagat Jyoti Malla and his minister Vanshamani Ojha. The book elaborates on Bharata Muni's Natya Shastra and Abhinavagupta's Abhinavabharati. This was followed by Gayanlochan, written during the reign of Jitamitra Malla. Gayanlochan focuses more on introduction to raga (and raginis), their characteristics, and performance. Various treatises on musical instruments used in Dapha such as Taal anukaranam, Mridanga anukaranam, Panchataal baaja etc. have also guided Dapha over centuries.

== Performance ==
The dapha ensemble consists of percussion instruments consisting of moo dhimay, khin, paschima, nyah khin, jwo nagara, damaru, accompanied by cymbals such as taa, bhusya and kaynpin. The melody is maintained by flutes called basuri. Dapha has a set of rituals from the initiation of a musical performance to its end. The pieces of music played are called gwaras and the first gwara is always "Nasa dya gwara" or "Dyah lhaaye", which is a devotional piece dedicated to Nasa dya. The ragas sung are preceded by a short alap. Dapha music moves from Dyah lhaaye (द्यः ल्हाय्), then proceeds to chuma (छुमा), bhatwa (भात्वा), lajah (लज), chali (चाली), gau (गौ), dhocha (धोचा), arati (आरती) and finally ends with dyah lhay (द्या ल्हाय्).

Different dapha khala of different places may have their own rules of practice, lawaja in dapha music. Dapha music is also taken as one of tantrik music. So, there is a rigid rule and females are forbidden in dapha. Bansuri khala is not taken as dapha khala. Bansuri khala, Chigwo/yelepo dhime in ktm came into existence for entertainment later on, which can be practiced by any gender.

The dapha music is performed according to a fixed schedule. There are specific pieces of music which are played during specific season, specific day of week and specific hours of day. The following is a list of musical compositions along with their timings

Seasonal variation in dapha music

Season	Festival	Song	Comments
Grishma (Summer)	Sithinakha to Gathāmuga Chare	Sinjyā	
Barsha (Monsoon)	Gathāmuga Chare to Yanlā Punhi	Tukājyā	
Sharad (Autumn)		Silu mye	
Hemant (Winter)	Dashian (Mohanee)	Mālshree	Incorporated into mainstream Nepalese music as the music of Dashain
Shishir		Holi mye	
Basant	Shree panchami to Buddha Jayanti	Vasanta	Played to Head of state of Nepal in Nasalchowk on Vasant Panchami

The schedule of different ragas played by Dapha on different times of day are as follows-

Rāg	Time of day
Kola	Midnight to 1 am
Namāmi	1 am to 2 am
Mālawā	2 am to 3 am
Bihan chuli	3 am to 5 am
Bhakta	5 am to 7 am
Jayashree	7 am to 9 am
Māluwā	9 am to Noon
Bibhas	Noon to 1 pm
Asavari	1 pm to 2 pm
Padmajati	2 pm to 3 pm
Desh	3 pm to 4 pm
Kausi	4 pm to 6 pm
Kedar	6 pm to 7 pm
Wijaya	7 pm to 10 pm
Wimāsa	10 pm to 11 pm
Nāya	11 pm to Midnight

== See also ==
- Newa music
