= Thattai (instrument) =

Indian percussion instrument

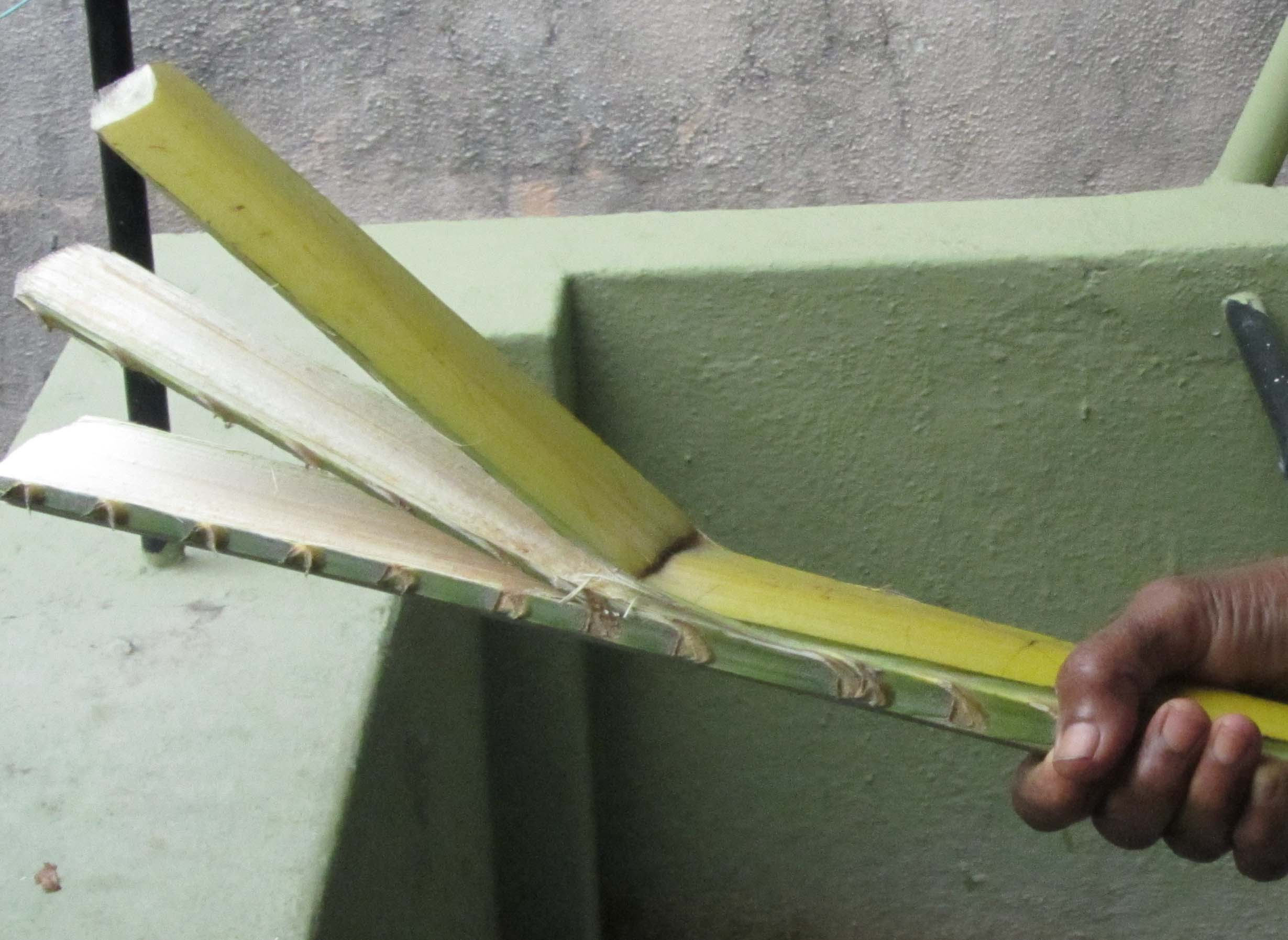
Thattai

The thattai (Tamil: தட்டை) is an Indian percussion instrument, a type of clapper belonging to the idiophone instruments family.

The thattai consists of a cane tube, in which the end has three reeds (two of them free) that produce a percussive sound when the shaft is shaken with one hand. The thattai is used as a toy or as rhythmic accompaniment instrument.

== Nepal ==
In Nepal, the instrument is called patpate (पटपटे), from the "pat pat" sound it makes when swinging it. There it is made of a split banana stalk, or the leaves. The edges of the leaves are cut away to leave the stiff middle stalk-section. The 20 cm long stalk is split into three sections (each about 12 cm long), leaving a handle about 8 cm long. The instrument or toy is about 5 cm wide.
