= Urni =

The Urni is a one-string fiddle played especially by the Dhimal community of Eastern Himalaya. A coconut resonator impaled by a stick (which acts as the instrument's neck. String runs from the top of the neck down along the stick, over the skin soundboard, and is fastened below the coconut resonator. Played with a bow.
