= Jhong =

Jhong झोङ
- Village development committee
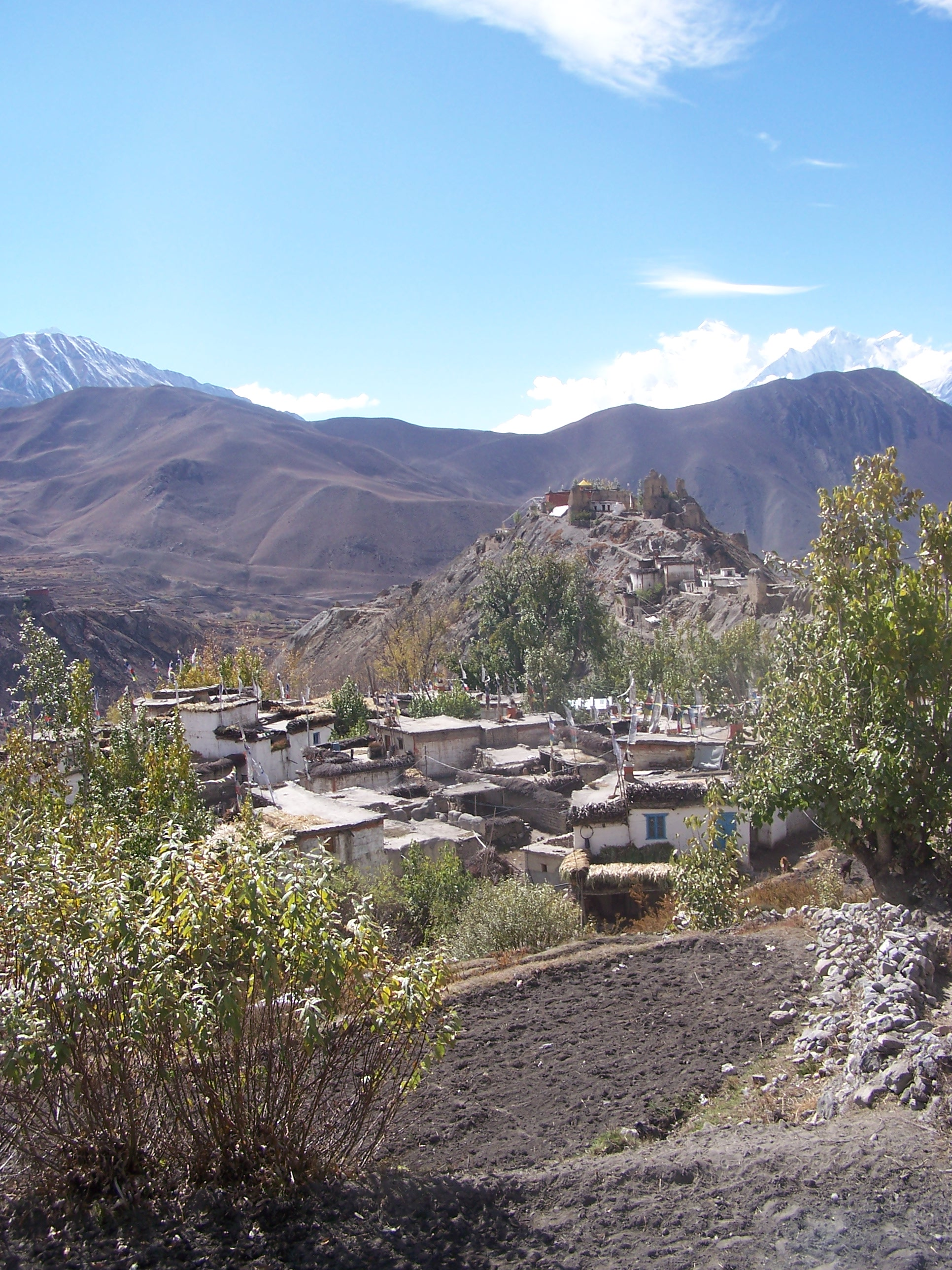
- Jhong

- Location in Nepal Jhong (Nepal)
- Coordinates: 28°49′38″N 83°51′17″E
- Country: Nepal
- Zone: Dhawalagiri Zone
- District: Mustang District

Population (1991)
  - Total: 450
- Time zone: UTC+5:45 (Nepal Time)

Jhong is a village development committee in Mustang District in the Dhawalagiri Zone of northern Nepal. At the time of the 1991 Nepal census, it had a population of 450 people living in 91 individual households.
