= Jankwa =

Newar ritual

Jankwa (or Janko) is a Newar ritual in Nepal to commemorate the young, elderly and infants in the community.

== Types of Jankwa ==
There are two types of jankwa:

- Macha jankwa, celebrated once
- Jyah Jankwa (Bhim Ratharohan) which can be celebrated up to five times.
