= Khin =

Type of membranophone

The Khin is a classical membranophone used in Newar music. Khin are played in pair putting on lap by the players facing each other.

The Khin is made of a hollow wooden trunk with membrane covering both sides. The right side is covered with cow skin, while the left side is covered with goat skin. Both sides are attached with a black tuning paste called khau. The right hole of the trunk is narrower than the left one, and thus sound produced from the right side is sharper than the sound from left side.

It is played during 'Bhajans' and different festivals also like 'Ghintanghisi' and others.
