= Janabahaadya =

Deity in Vajrayana Buddhism

Janabahaadya chariot

Janabahaadya (Nepal Bhasa:जनबहा:द्य, Sanskrit: आर्यावलोकिर्तेश्वर) is one of the deities of Vajrayana Buddhism. Also known as Seto Machhendranath.
