= Dhaa =

Type of drum

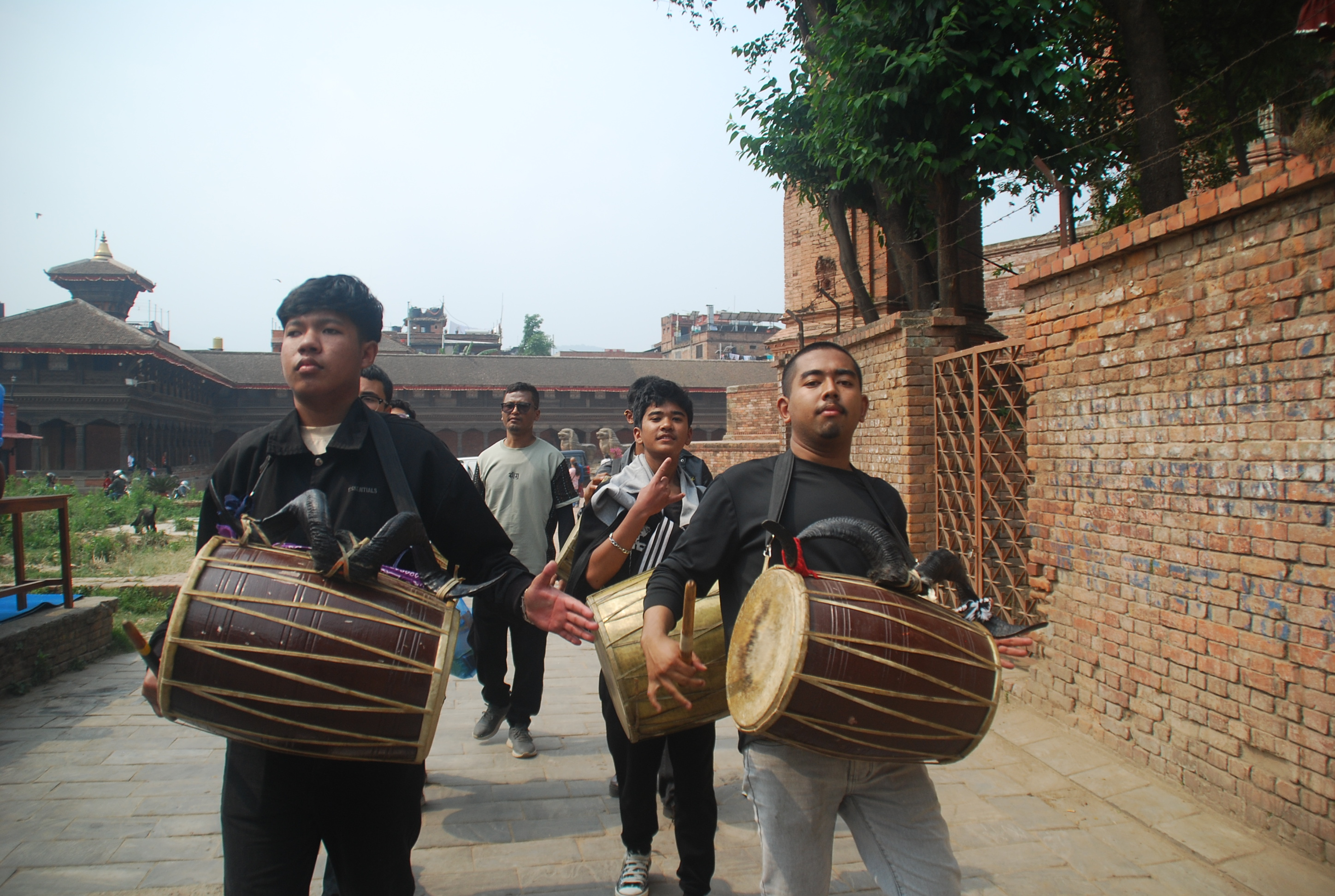
Two boys from Bhaktapur playing Dhaa during Biska jatra

The Dhaa (or Dhah) is a two-headed drum, "slightly smaller than the Dhimay." It belongs to the membranophone group of Newar traditional musical instruments. It is a kind of drum specially played during the month of Gunlaa, the ninth month of Newar calendar. Dhaa is also known as "Gunlaa Baajan".

It is made of a hollow wooden trunk covered at both sides with animal skin. The left side is covered with a thicker skin, producing a flat sound, whereas the right side is covered with thinner skin and produces sharper sounds.

The Dhaa is played by a group of even number of people standing. The instrument is suspended by a belt over the right shoulder of the player. Dhaa is always accompanied by Taa and Bhushyaa along with the tunes from some aerophones.
