= Piwancha =

Nepali chordophone

String instrument
- Classification: String instrument
- Developed: Nepal

A piwancha is a Nepali chordophone with two strings and a drum at one end. It is a bowed instrument believed to have been played by members of the jyapu caste of Newars in the Kathmandu Valley during the Malla period. No original artifacts have survived, though images have enabled the creation of reproductions.

The strings are tuned to C and G.

== See also ==
- Nepali performance featuring piwancha.
