= Gunla Bajan =

Buddhist devotional music in Nepal

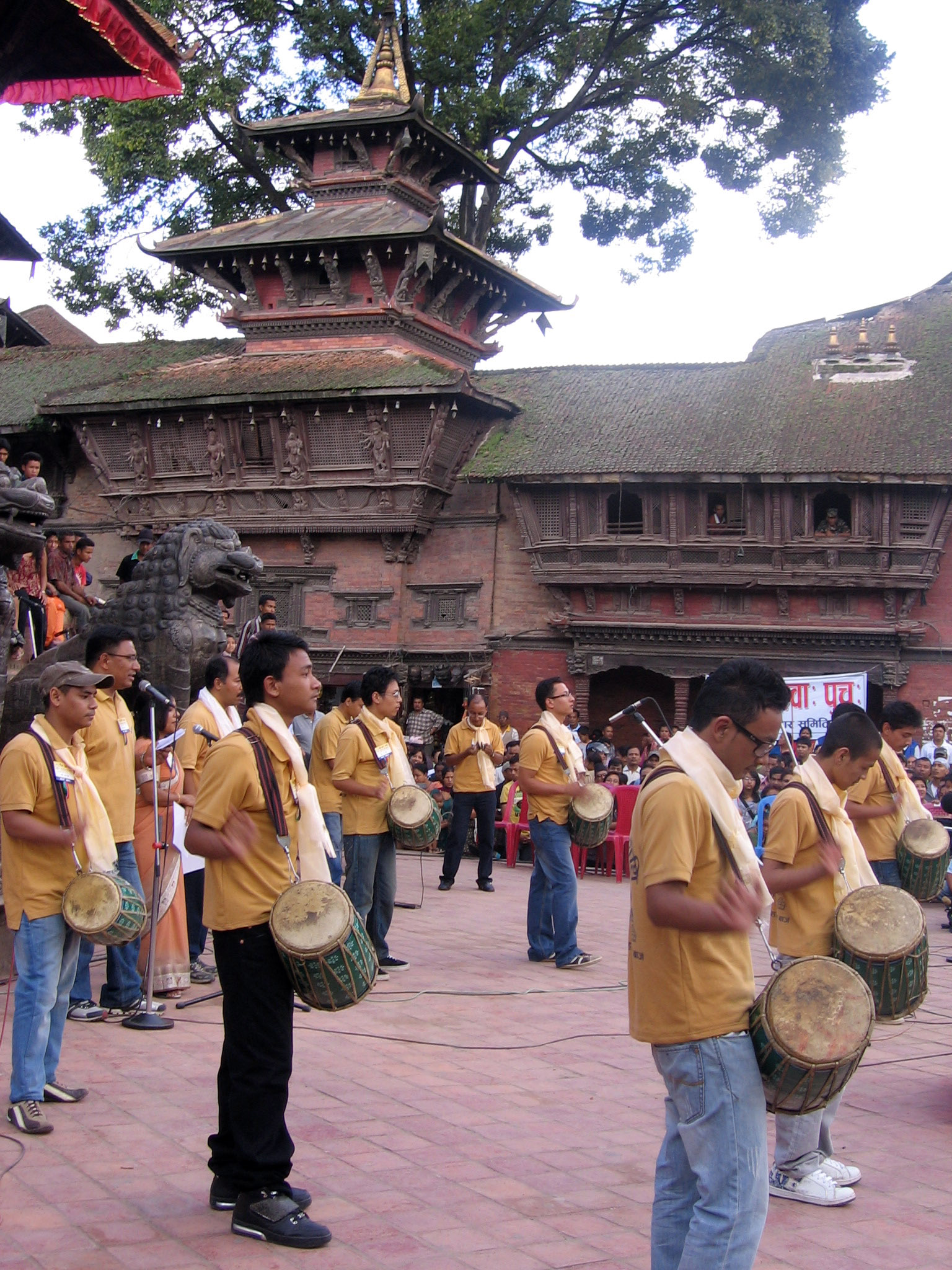
Kansakar Gunla Bajan players at Kathmandu Durbar Square.

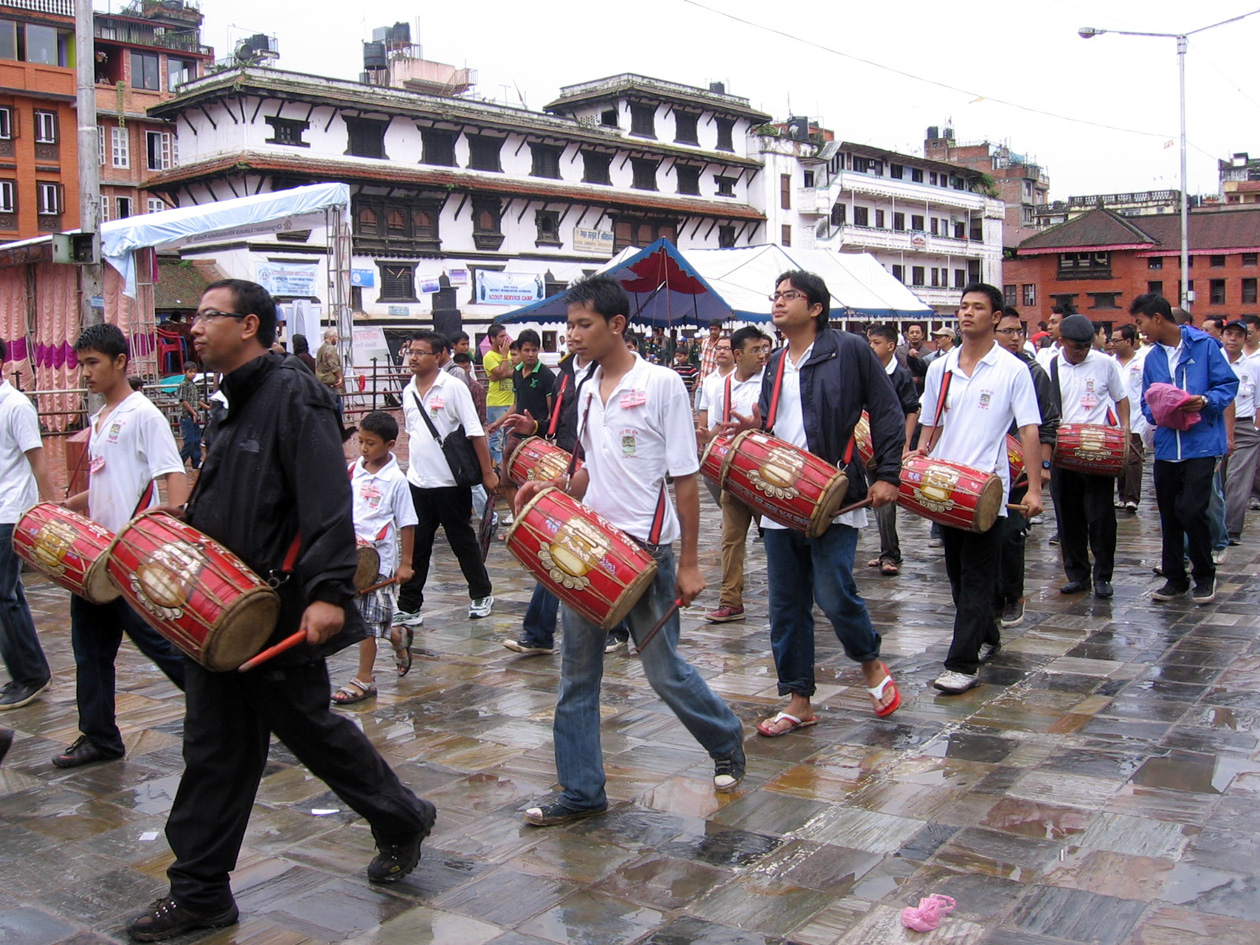
Asan Gunla Bajan players

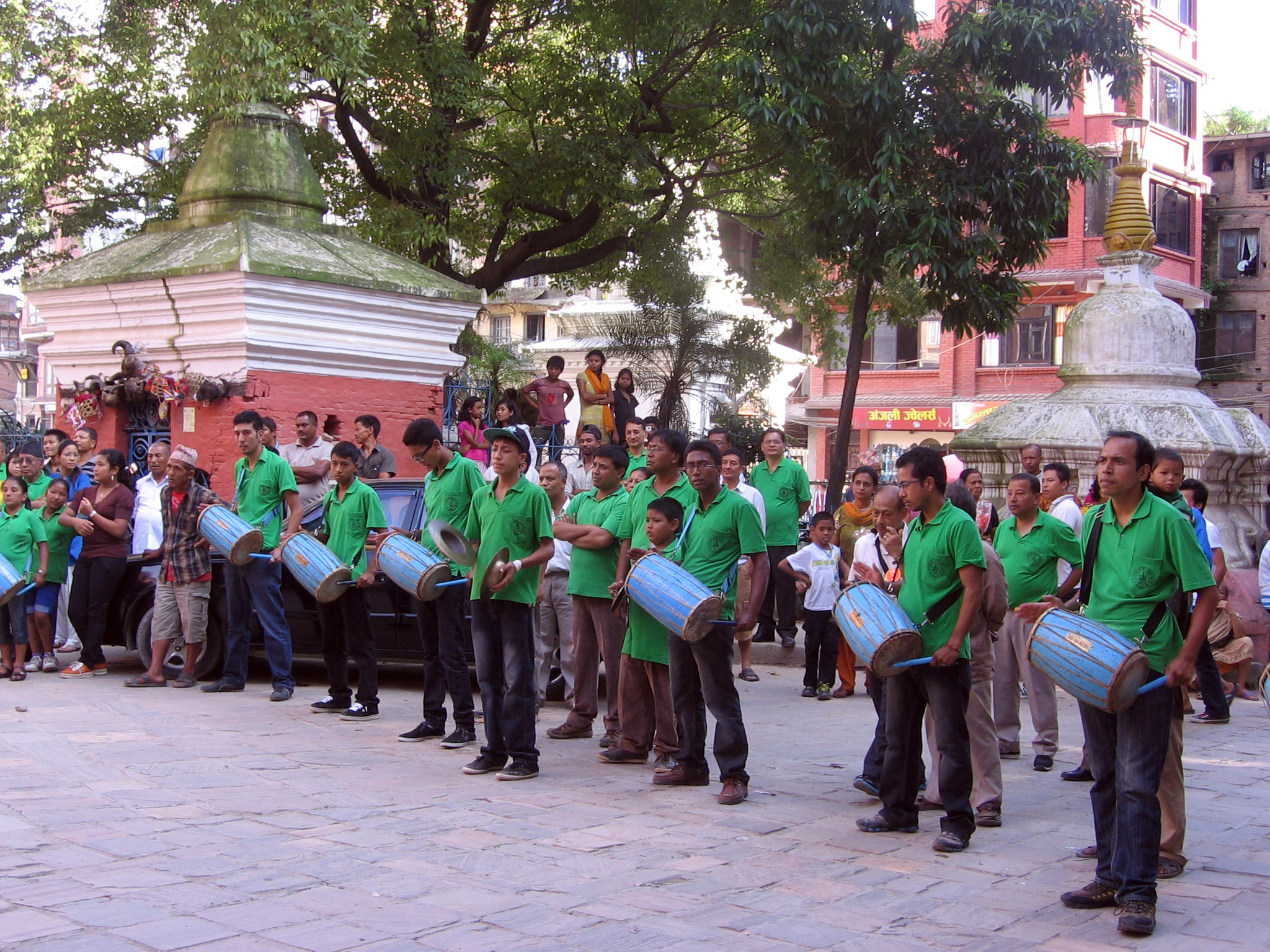
Tebaha Gunla Bajan players

Gunlā Bājan (Newar: गुंला बाजं) is Buddhist devotional music played by the Newars of Nepal. "Gunla" is the name of the tenth month in the Nepal Sambat calendar, which corresponds to August in the Gregorian calendar and "bajan" means "music" and "music playing group".

Gunla is a sacred month for the Newar Buddhist community when they recite the Buddhist scriptures and visit places of worship playing devotional music. The practice of observing the sacred month is descended from the rains retreat dating from the Buddha's time when monks were to stay in one place and teach the Dhamma to the locals during this period.

== Performances ==
Societies based on locality or caste, in which membership is hereditary, organize Gunla Bajan performances. These groups follow an annual calendar of public performances. They also conduct music lessons and hold religious festivals, hymn singing sessions and feasts.

The most important activity of the year is making daily pilgrimages during Gunla to Swayambhu and other Buddhist sites playing Gunla music. The main days during the holy month are Bahidyah Swahwanegu (बहीद्यः स्वःवनेगु), when devotees playing Gunla music visit sacred courtyards to view the images of Bahidyah (Dipankara Buddha) and paubha paintings put on display for the festival; and Nisala Chhawanegu (निसला छा:वनेगु), when offerings are made to Swayambhu and concerts are held at one's neighborhoods. Gunla musical bands also lead processions during New Year's Day of Nepal Sambat.

== Music ==
A performance of Gunla music starts with Dyah Lhayegu, a short salutation to the deities. Separate pieces of music are played when marching in procession, going around a shrine and crossing a bridge. These are known as Lawantah, Chwoh, Graha, Astar, Palimaa and Partaal.

During processions, musicians usually play the tunes of seasonal songs or other traditional songs backed by drums and cymbals. Tunes of modern hits are also played.

Gwara is a long piece of music which is played in temple squares and sacred courtyards with the musicians standing in a circle. It is 15 to 20 minutes long. The popular ones are Annapurna Gwara, Swetkali Gwara and Sangin Gwara.

== Instruments ==
The double-sided drum known as "dhaa" (धा:), which is the main instrument in Gunla music, is believed to have been played in the Kathmandu Valley for 2,000 years. It is struck on the left side with a short stick and on the right side with the hand.

Trumpets and clarinets are used to play the tune. Originally, local wind instruments known as "mwahali" (म्वाहालि) and "basuri" (बासुरि) provided the tune.

The other instruments used are "taa" (ता:) and "bhusya" (भुस्या:), small and large cymbals respectively. The "naykhin" (नायखिं) small drum and "chhusya" (छुस्या:) cymbals form a separate set of instruments. The "payentah" (पंयता:) is a long trumpet.
