= Architecture of Kathmandu =

Overview of the architecture in Kathmandu

Kathmandu Valley World Heritage Site (WHS) Seven Monuments and Buildings

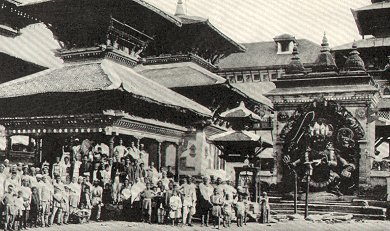
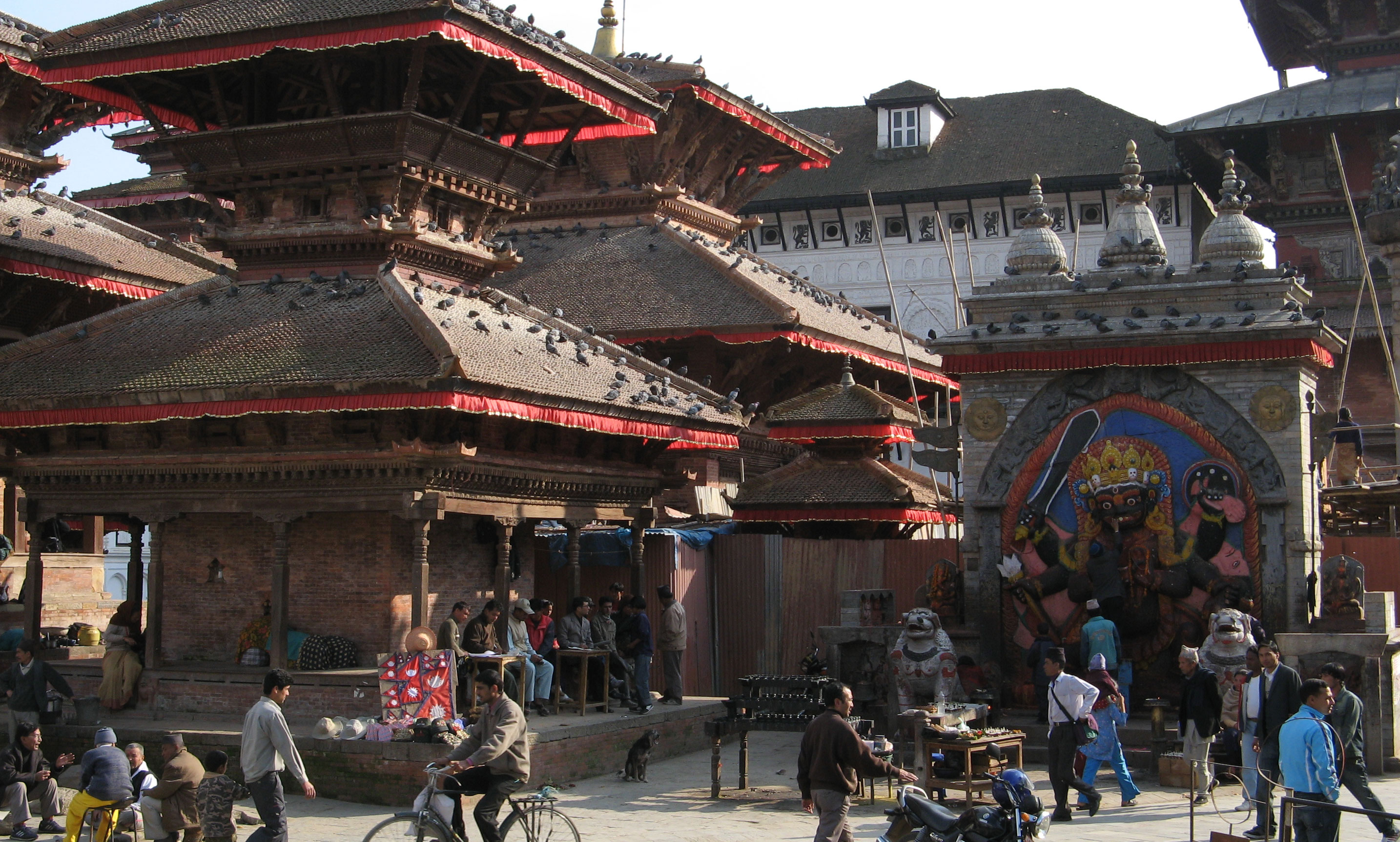
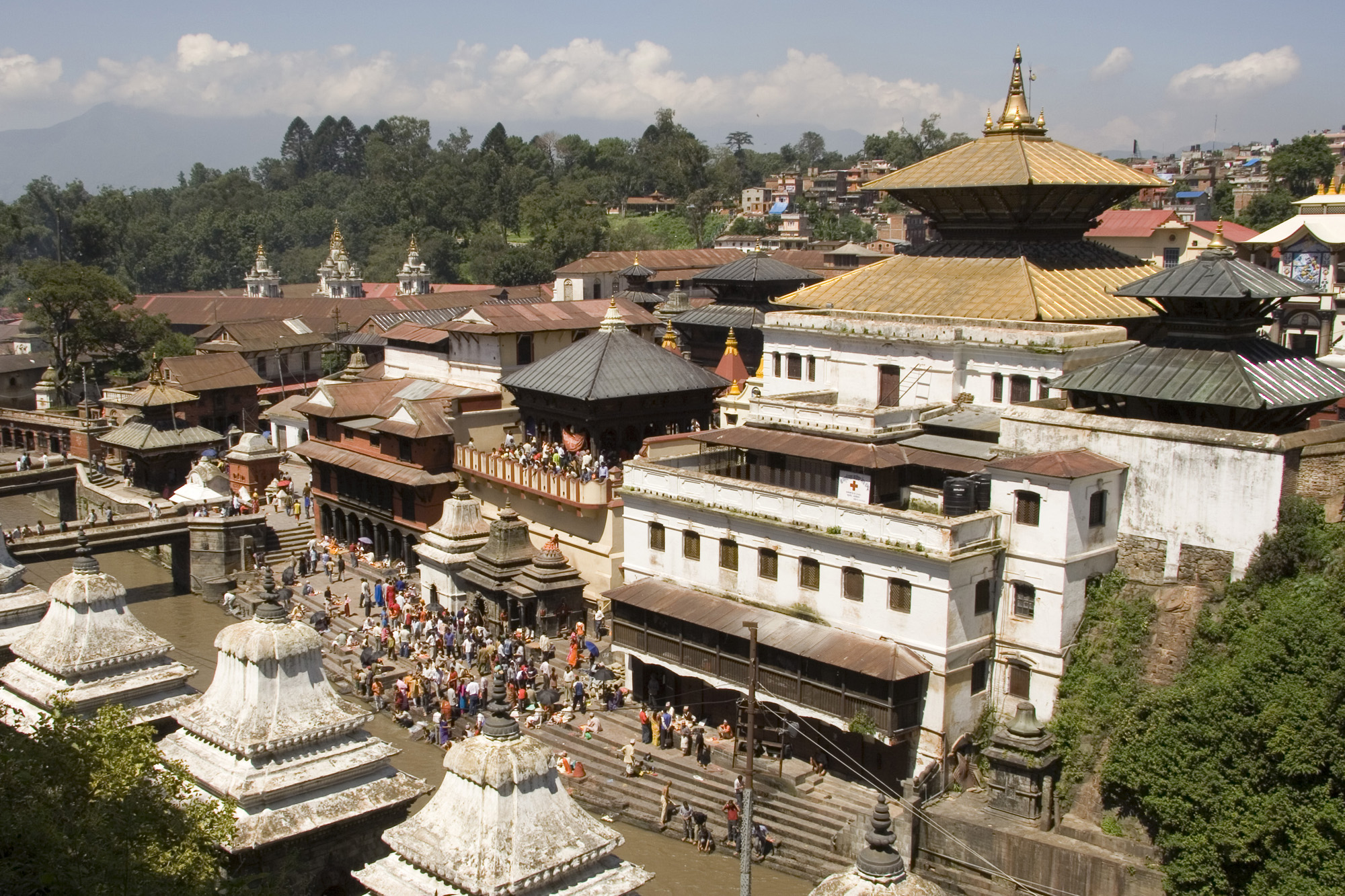
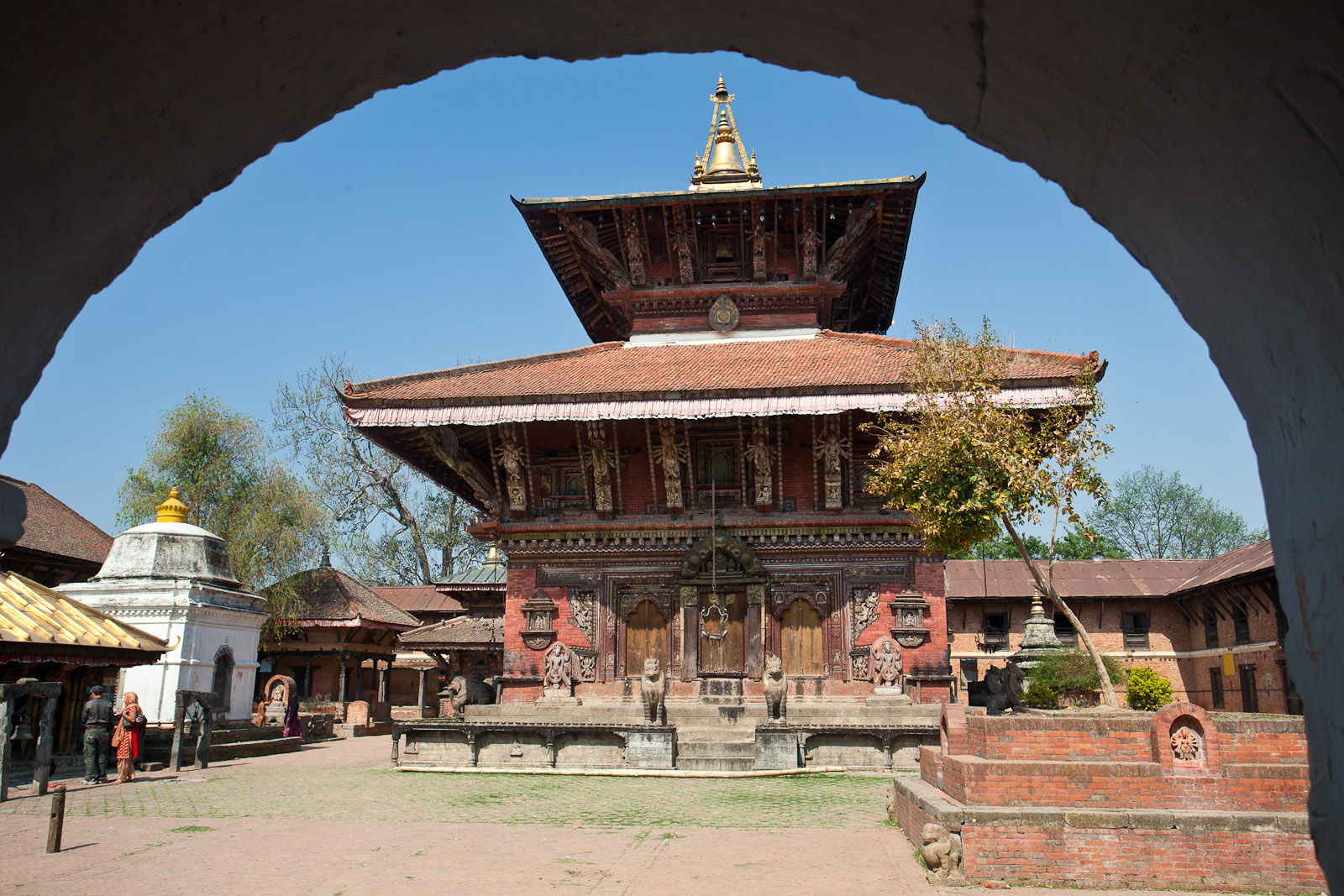
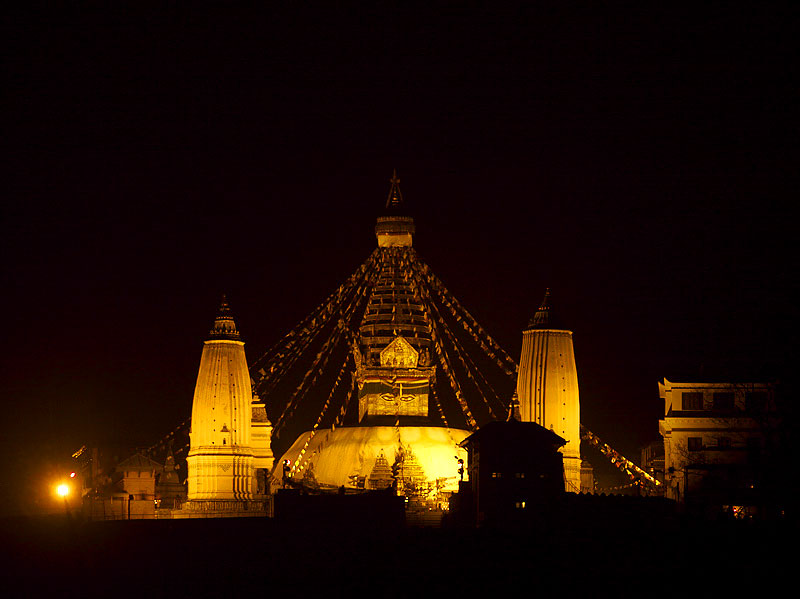
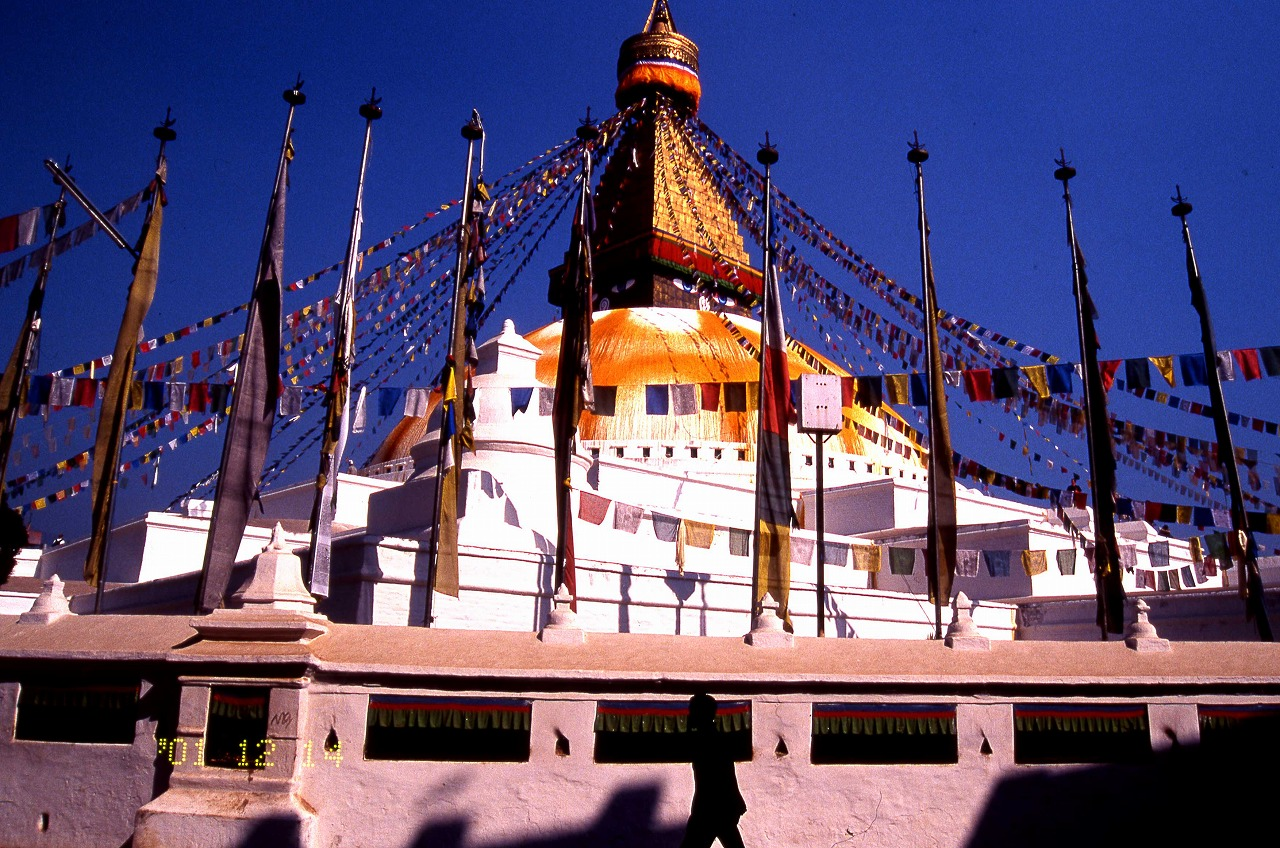
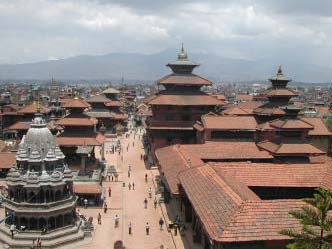
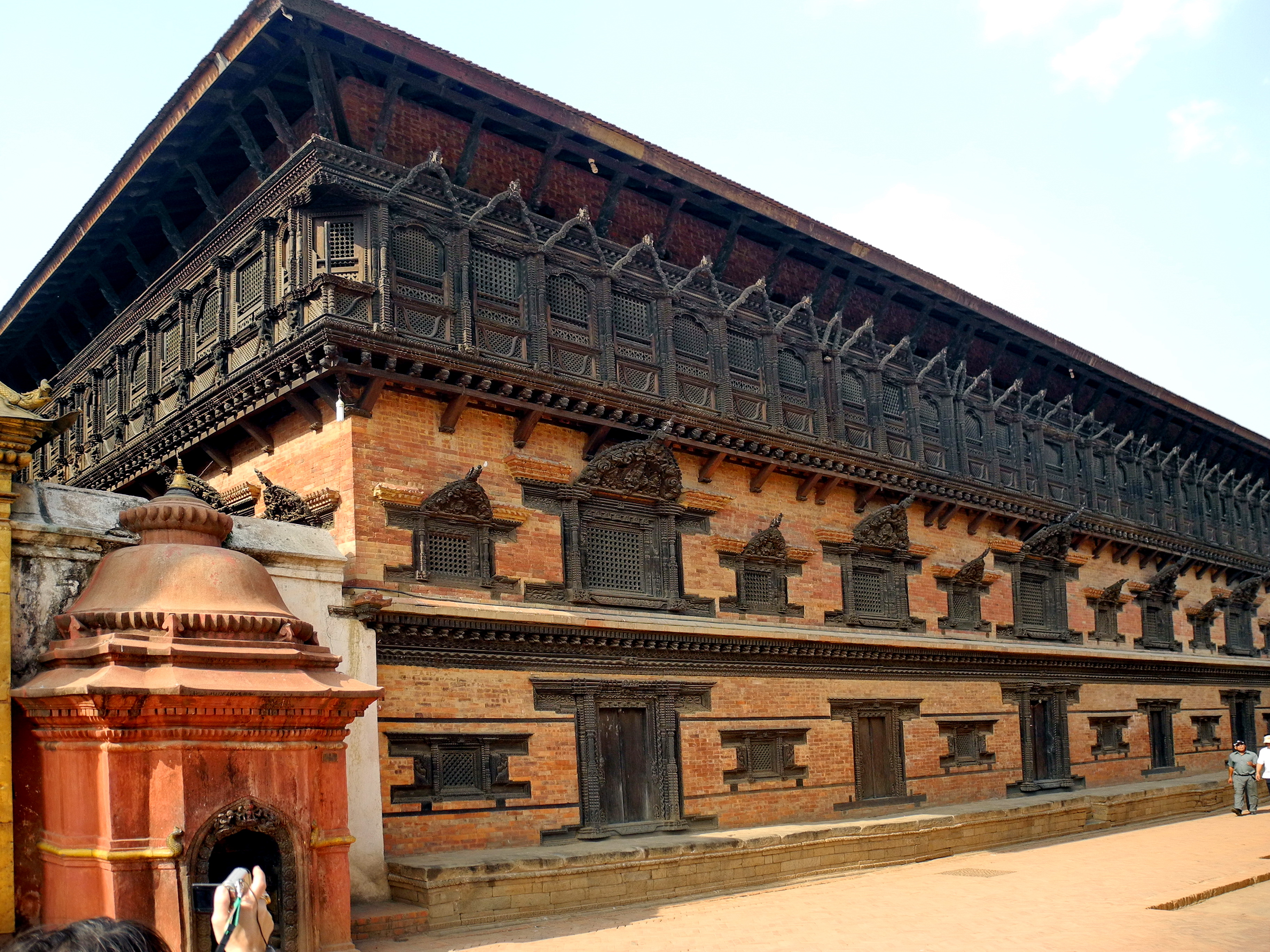

• Kathmandu Durbar Square in 1920 •
• Kathmandu Durbar Square in 2007 •
• Pashupatinath • Changunarayan •
• Swayambhunath • Boudhanath •
• Patan Durbar Square •
• Bhaktapur Durbar Square •

The architectural heritage of Kathmandu city is integral to that of the Kathmandu Valley since all monuments have evolved over centuries of craftsmanship influenced by Hindu and Buddhist religious practices. The architectural treasure of the Kathmandu valley has been categorized under the well known seven groups of heritage monuments and buildings. In 2006, UNESCO declared these seven groups of monuments as a World Heritage Site (WHS). The seven monuments zones cover an area of 188.95 hectares (466.9 acres), with the buffer zone extending to 239.34 hectares (591.4 acres). The Seven Monument Zones (Mzs) inscribed originally in 1979 with a minor modification in inscribed year as 2006, are: five monuments in Kathmandu – Durbar square of Hanuman Dhoka, Hindu temples of Pashupatinath and Changunarayan, the Buddha stupas of Swayambu and Boudhanath; and two monuments outside Kathmandu city limits, in the satellite towns of Patan and Bhktapur – Durbar square at Patan, Durbar square at Bhaktapur. Brief details of the five Kathmandu city monuments (template shows all seven for sake of completeness) are elaborated here.

Kathmandu has also been described variously as "Land of Gods" and as "land of the largest congregations of magnificent historical monuments and shrines ever built". The City Core has most of the remarkable cultural wealth that evolved during the reign of the Malla (Nepal) kings between 15th and 18th centuries. The city was filled with sculptures, pagodas, stupas and palace buildings of exceptional beauty. There are also 106 monastic courtyards (known as baha or bahi) known for their art and piety.

== Durbar square ==
The literal meaning of Durbar Square is a place of palaces. There are three preserved Durbar Squares in Kathmandu valley and one unpreserved in Kirtipur. The Durbar Square of Kathmandu is located in the old city and has heritage buildings representing four kingdoms (Kantipur, Lalitpur, Bhaktapur, Kirtipur), built over centuries, the earliest being the Licchavi dynasty. There were further additions and refurbishments during the reign of Mallas (9th century) and then the Ranas. The complex has 50 temples and is distributed in two quadrangles of the Durbar Square. The outer quadrangle has the Kasthamandap, Kumari Ghar and Shiva-Parvati Temple while the inner quadrangle has the Hanuman dhoka and the main palace.

=== Kasthamandap ===
Kasthamandap is a three storied temple enshrining the deity of Gorakhnath – (Sanskrit for Gau+Raksha+Nath: Cow+Protect+Lord; The Lord who protects cows) – a form of the god Shiva. It was built in the 16th century in Pagoda style. It is said to be one of the oldest wooden buildings in the world. The name of Kathmandu is a derivative of the Kashtamandap. It was built under the reign of King Laxmi Narsingha Malla and an interesting legend is stated to its wooden construction. The story narrated is about Gorakhnath, a disciple of Machindranath (Nepal Bhasa: Janamaadya) Gorakhnath, who was spotted by a, during the chariot procession of his guru Machhindranath (Nepal Bhasa: Janamaadya). The tantrik held him under a spell and sought his help seeking materials to build a temple in Kathmandu. Once the boon was bestowed, a huge tree started growing at the location where the present temple exists. With the wood of this single tree, the tantrik built the Kastamantap temple. Once a year a huge ceremony is performed in the temple. On that day people gather around the temple, and they stay up all night. This temple is one of the major tourist attractions too. There are no restrictions on entry to the temple. However, photography is prohibited inside the temple. The temple is open after midday until midnight.

=== Hanuman Dhoka ===
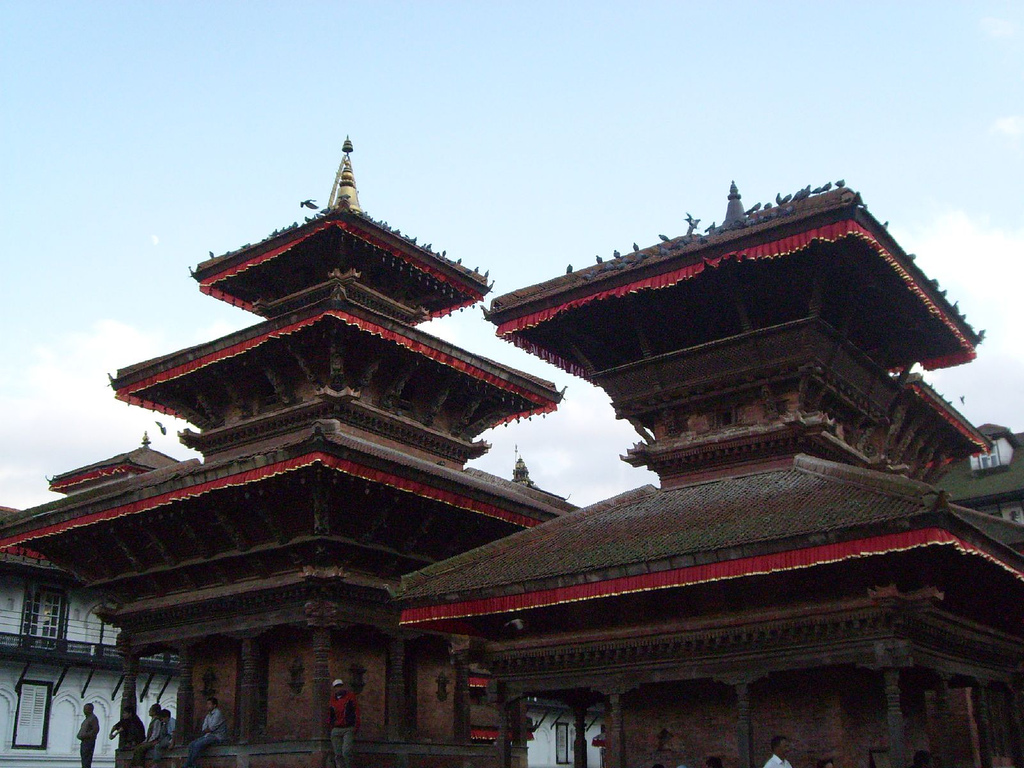
Temples at Hanuman Dhoka

Hanuman Dhoka is a complex of structures with the Royal Palace of the Malla kings and also of the Shah dynasty. It is spread over five acres. The eastern wing with ten courtyards is the oldest part dated to the mid-16th century. It was expanded by King Pratap Malla in the 17th century with many temples. Sundari Chowk and Mohan Chowk in the north part of the palace are both closed. In 1768, in the southeast part of the palace, four lookout towers were added by Prithvi Narayan Shah. The royal family lived in this palace till 1886, where after they shifted to Narayanhiti Palace. The stone inscription outside is in fifteen languages and legend states that if all the 15 are read milk would spring from the middle of stone tablet.

=== Kumari Ghar ===
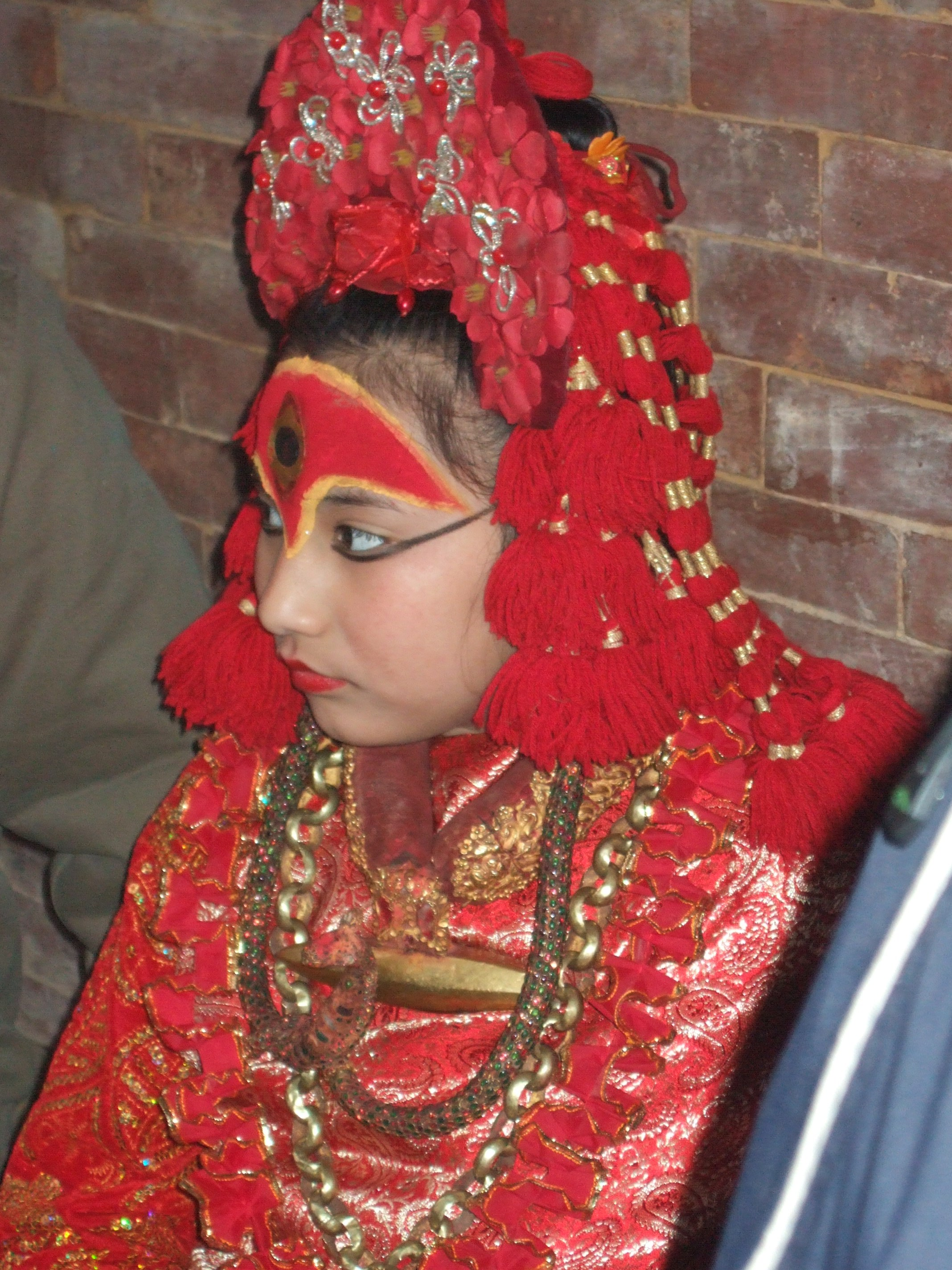
Kumari Devi living goddess of Nepal at Kathmandu 2007

Kumari Ghar is a palace in the center of the Kathmandu city, next to the Durbar square where a Royal Kumari selected from several Kumaris from several places resides. Kumari, or Kumari Devi, is the tradition of worshipping young pre-pubescent girls as manifestations of the divine female energy or devi in South Asian countries. In Nepal the selection process for her is very rigorous. Kumari is believed to be the bodily incarnation of the goddess Taleju (the Nepalese name for Durga) until she menstruates, after which it is believed that the goddess vacates her body. Serious illness or a major loss of blood from an injury are also causes for her to revert to common status. The current Royal Kumari, Matina Shakya, aged four, was installed in October 2008 by the Maoist government that replaced the monarchy.

== Pashupatinath temple ==
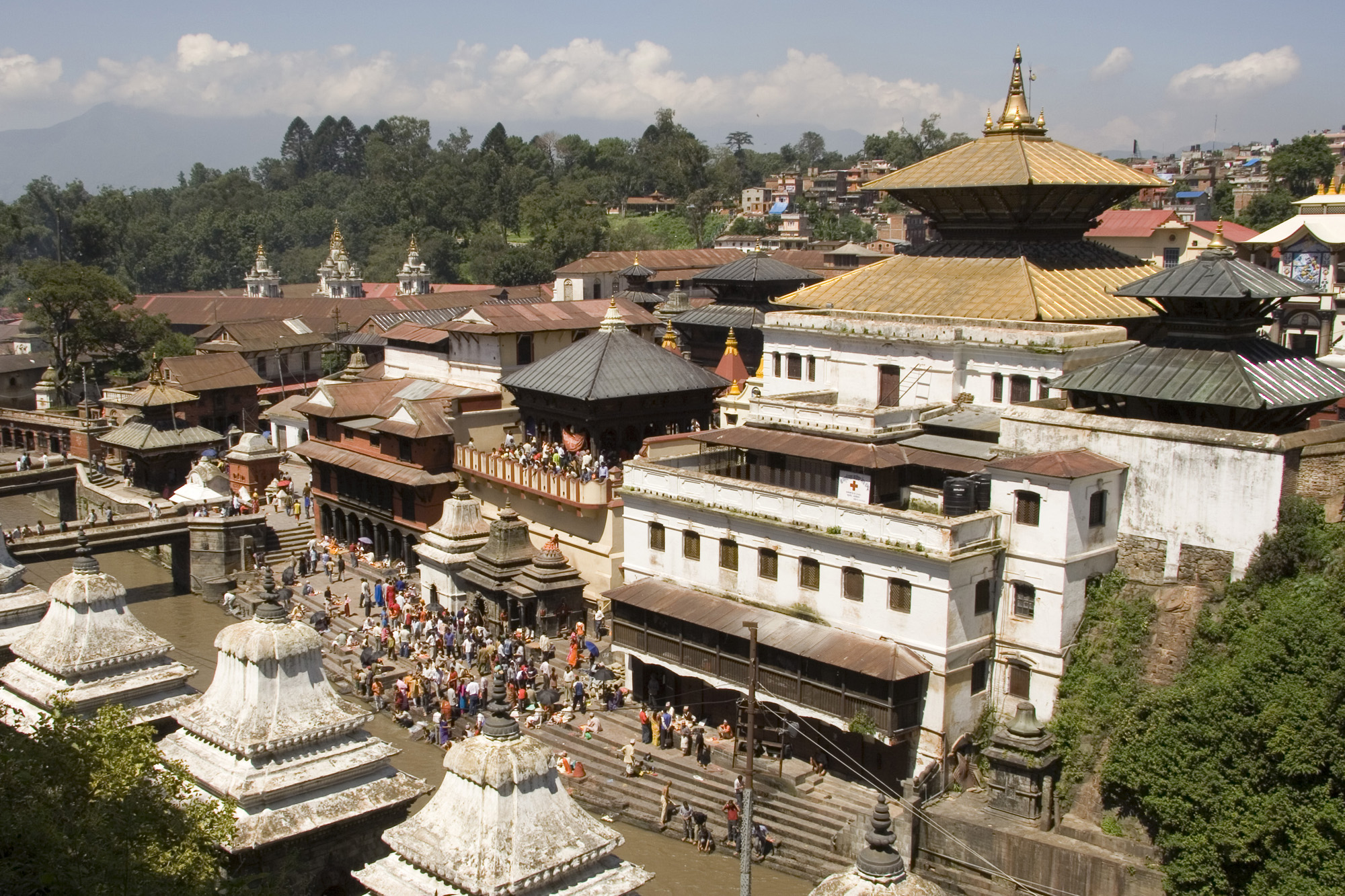
Pasupatinath

The Pashupatinath Temple is a famous Hindu temple dedicated to Lord Shiva (Pashupati). Located on the banks of the Bagmati River in the eastern part of Kathmandu, Pashupatinath Temple is the oldest Hindu temple in Kathmandu, and served as the seat of national deity, Lord Pashupatinath, until Nepal was secularized. However, a significant part of the temple was destroyed by Islamic invaders underShamsuddin Ilyas Shah of Bengal in the 14th century and little or nothing remains of the original 5th-century temple exterior. The temple as it stands today was built anew in the 17th century by King Bhupatindra Malla after the previous building had been consumed by termites., although the image of the bull and the black four headed Lingam Pashupati is at least 400 years old. The temple is listed in UNESCO World Heritage Sites list. Shivaratri or the night of Lord Shiva is the most important festival, attracting thousands of devotees and sadhus.

Believers in Pashupatinath (mainly Hindus) are allowed to enter the temple premises but non-Hindu visitors are allowed to view the temple from the across the bank of Bagmati river. The priests who perform the services at this temple have been Brahmins from South India since the time of Malla king Yaksha Malla. This tradition is believed to have been started at the request of Adi Shankaracharya who sought to unify the different states of Bharatam (Unified India) by encouraging cultural exchange. This procedure is also followed in other temples around India, which were sanctified by Adi Shankaracharya.

The temple is built in the pagoda style of architecture, with cubic constructions, beautifully carved wooden rafters on which they rest (tundal) and two level roofs made of copper and gilded in gold. It has four main doors, all covered with silver sheets and the western door has a statue of large bull or Nandi, again covered in gold. The deity is of black stone, about 6 feet in height and the same in circumference.

== Boudhanath ==
The Boudhanath, (also written Bouddhanath, Bodhnath, Baudhanath or the Khāsa Chaitya), is one of the holiest Buddhist sites in Nepal along with Swayambhu, and it is one of the most popular tourist sites in the Kathmandu area. It is known as Khāsti by Newars and as Bauddha or Bodh-nāth by modern speakers of Nepali. Located about 11 km (7 mi) from the center and northeastern outskirts of Kathmandu, the stupa's massive mandala makes it one of the largest spherical stupas in Nepal. Boudhanath became a UNESCO World Heritage Site in 1979.

The Gopālarājavaṃśāvalī documents that the Boudhanath was founded by the Nepalese Licchavi king Śivadeva (c. 590–604 AD); though other Nepalese chronicles date it to the reign of King Mānadeva (464–505 AD). Tibetan sources claim a mound on the site was excavated in the late 15th or early 16th century and the bones of king Amshuverma 605–621 were discovered there while other Nepali sources claim it was constructed by a prince to seek forgiveness for unwittingly killing his own father . However, the Emperor of the Tibetan Empire, Trisong Detsen (r. 755 to 797) is also traditionally associated with the construction of the Boudhanath Stupa, after Songtsen Gampo was converted to Buddhism by his wives the Nepali princess Bhrikuti Devi and Princess Wencheng of China in the 7th century and passes it on to Detsän. However, given that Kathmandu was invaded by the Mughals in the 14th century who would have destroyed the monument, the current stupa is believed to date to sometime after this.

The base of the stupa has 108 small depictions of the Dhyani Buddha Amitābha and is surrounded with a brick wall with 147 inches, each with four or five prayer wheels engraved with the mantra, Om mani padme hum. At the northern entrance where visitors must pass is a shrine dedicated to the goddess of smallpox, Ajima. The stupa attracts many Tibetan Buddhist pilgrims annually who perform full body prostrations in the inner lower enclosure, circumambulate the stupa with prayer wheels and chant and pray. Thousands of prayer flags are hoisted up from the top of the stupa downwards and dot the parameters of the complex. The influx of large populations of Tibetan refugees from China has seen the construction of over 50 Tibetan gompas (monasteries) around Boudhanath.

== Swayambhu ==
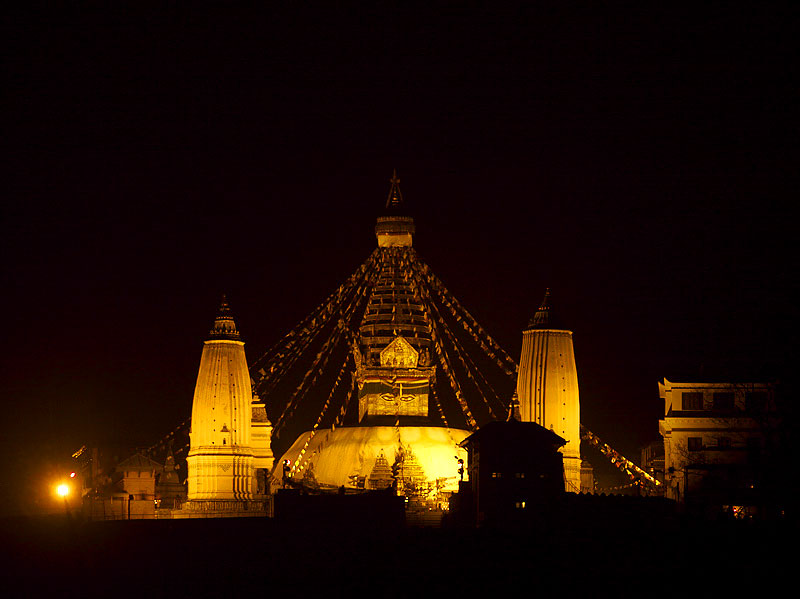
Swayambhu at night

Swayambhu, also known as the Monkey Temple as there are holy monkeys living in parts of the temple in the north-west, is among the oldest religious sites in Nepal. Although the site is considered Buddhist, the place is revered by both Buddhists and Hindus. Numerous kings, Hindu followers, are known to have paid their homage to the temple, including Pratap Malla, the powerful king of Kathmandu, who is responsible for the construction of the eastern stairway in the 17th century. According to the Gopālarājavaṃśāvalī Swayambhu was founded by the great-grandfather of King Mānadeva (464–505 AD), King Vrsadeva, about the beginning of the 5th century AD. This seems to be confirmed by a damaged stone inscription found at the site, which indicates that King Mānadeva ordered work done in 640 AD. However, Emperor Ashoka is said to have visited the site in the 3rd century BC and built a temple on the hill, which was later destroyed. Legend has it that the Buddha himself visited Swayambhu and gave teachings there two hundred years earlier.

The stupa consists of a dome at the base. Above the dome, there is a cubical structure present with eyes of Buddha looking in all four directions with the word "unity" in the main Nepali dialect between them. There are pentagonal Toran present above each of the four sides with statues engraved in them. Behind and above the torana there are thirteen tiers. Above all the tiers, there is a small space above which the Gajur is present.

== Changu Narayan ==
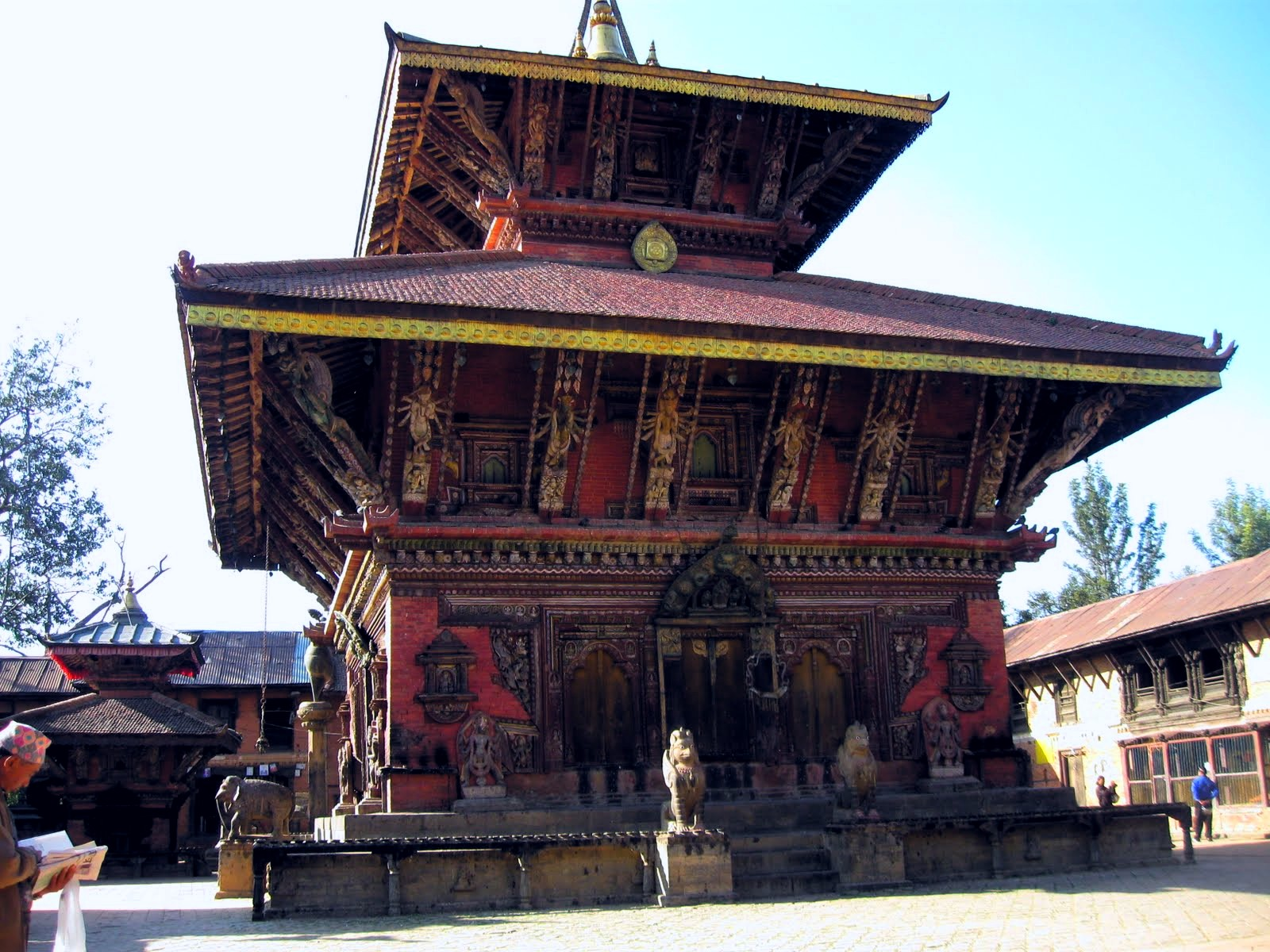
Front face of Changu Narayan temple

Changu Narayan is an ancient Hindu temple located near the village of Changunarayan in the Kathmandu Valley on top of a hill at the eastern end of the valley. Its location is 6 kilometres (3.7 mi) to the north of Bhakathapur and 22 kilometres (14 mi) from Kathmandu. The temple is one of the oldest Hindu temples of the valley, and is believed to have been constructed first in the 4th century. Changu Narayan is the name of Vishnu, and the temple is dedicated to him. A stone slab discovered in the vicinity of the temple dates to the 5th century, and is the oldest such stone inscription discovered in Nepal. It was rebuilt after the old temple was devastated. Many stone sculptures here date to the Licchavi period. Changu Narayan Temple is listed by UNESCO as a World Heritage Site.

The temple is a double-roofed structure where the idol of Lord Vishnu in his incarnation as Narayana is deified. The exquisitely built temple has intricate roof struts showing multi-armed Tantric deities. A kneeling image of Garuda (dated to the 5th century), the vahana or vehicle of Vishnu with a snake around its neck, faces the temple. The gilded door depicts stone lions guarding the temple. Gilded windows also flank the door. A conch and a disc, symbols of Vishnu, are carved on the two pillars at the entrance. Non-Hindus are not allowed inside the temple.

== Bhimsen Tower (Dharahara) ==
Dharahara, also known as the Bhimsen Tower, was a nine-story (50.2 metres (165 ft)) tall tower in the center of Kathmandu. It was originally built in 1832 by the Prime Minister of the time, Bhimsen Thapa, under the command of Queen Lalit Tripura Sundari. It survived an earthquake just two years after construction in 1834, but on 15 January 1934, another earthquake destroyed the tower. It was then rebuilt by the prime minister of the time, Juddha Shumsher, who renovated Dharahara to its previous form. This survived until 25 April 2015 when it was destroyed in the 2015 earthquake.

The tower was later reconstructed and inaugurated on 24 April 2021

== Narayanhiti Royal Palace ==
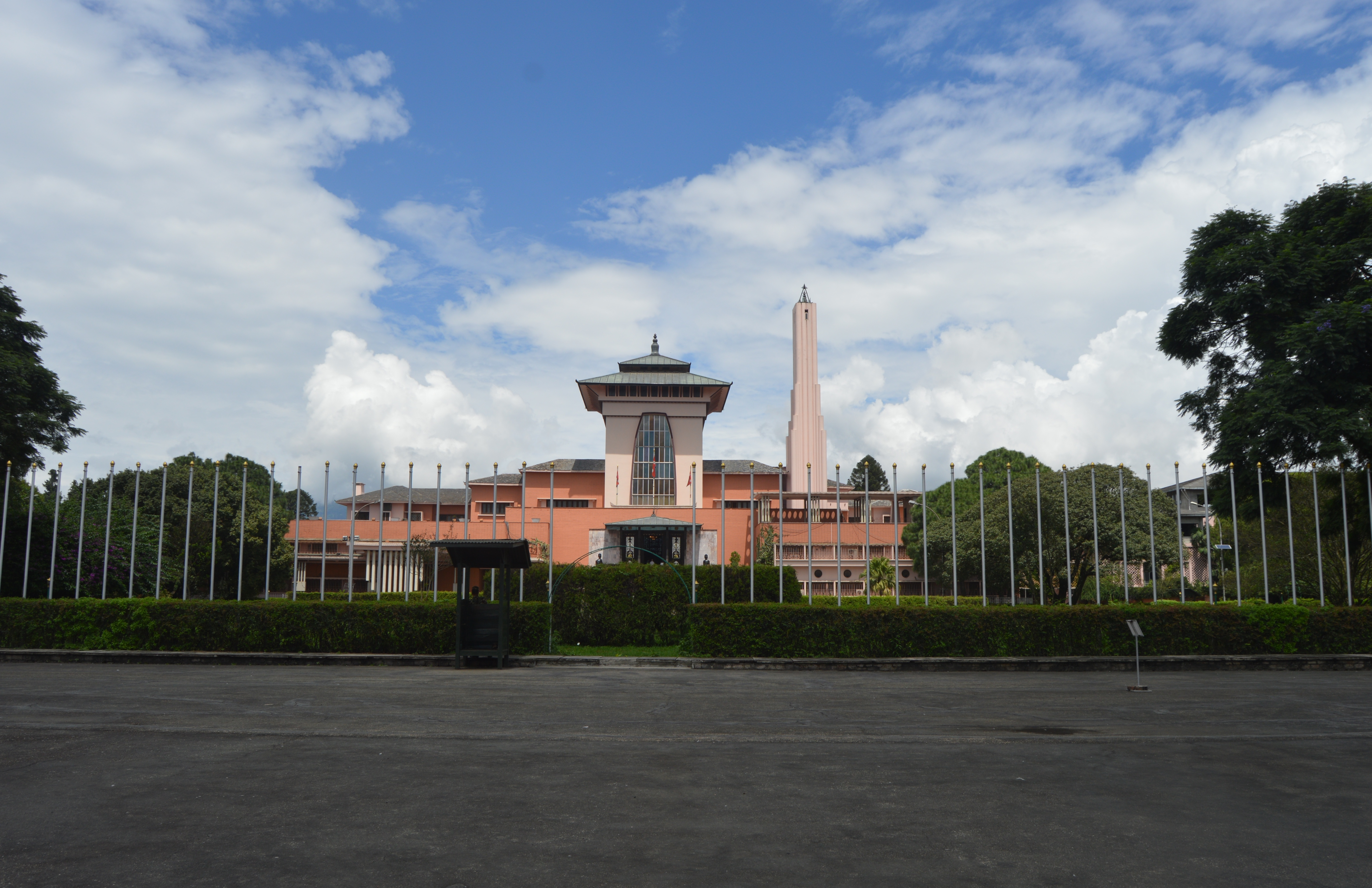
Narayanhity Royal Palace

Narayanhiti, in Narayanhiti Palace, is made up of two words ‘narayan’ and ‘hiti’. 'Naryan' is a form of Hindu god "Lord Vishnu” whose temple is located opposite to the palace and ‘hiti’ means “water spout” which is also located to the east of main entrance in the precincts of the palace, and which has a legend associated with it. The entire enclosure surrounded by a compound wall, located in the north-central part of Kathmandu, is called the Narayanhiti palace. It was a new palace, in front of the old palace of 1915 vintage, built in 1970 in the form of a contemporary Pagoda. It was built on the occasion of the marriage of King Birenda Bir Bikram Shah, the then heir apparent to the throne. The southern gate of the palace is located at the crossing of Prithvipath and Darbar Marg roads. The palace area covers (30 hectares (74 acres)) and is fully secured with gate controlled walls on all sides. The palace, as previously discussed in Kathmandu's history, was the scene of a gruesome tragedy, termed “Nepal's greatest tragedy”, on 1 June 2001, at the hall in the palace where the Crown Prince Dipendra in an inebriated state supposedly gunned down his immediate family consisting of his father King Birendra, his mother Queen Aishwarya, his brother and sister, and also five of his relatives, later killing himself. After the massacre of King Birendra and his family, the next king in line was his brother Gyanendra and his family who lived at the palace. The newly elected assembly on 28 May 2008, after a polling of 564 constituent assembly members, 560 voted to form a new government, with the monarchist Rastriya Prajatantra Party, which had four members in the assembly, registering a dissenting note. At that point, it was declared that Nepal had become a secular and inclusive democratic republic, with the government announcing a three-day public holiday from 28 to 30 May. The King was thereafter given 15 days to vacate the Narayanhiti Royal Palace, to reopen it as a public museum. until he was asked to move out of it.Now it has been turned into a Museum and is open for all to see.

== Hotels ==
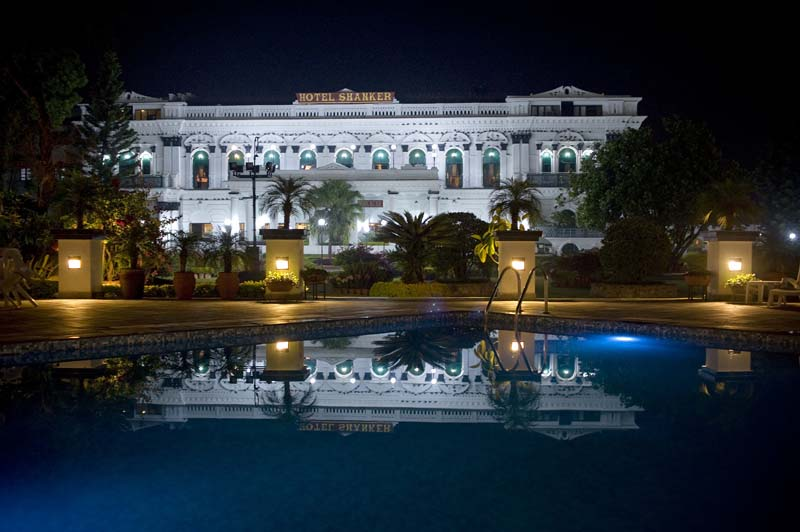
The Shanker Hotel in Kathmandu

With the opening of the tourist industry after the change over in the political scenario of Nepal in 1950, hotel industry got a boost. Now, Kathmandu boasts of several five star hotels such as Hotel Yak & Yeti, The Everest Hotel, Hotel Radisson, Soaltee Holiday Inn and De L'annapurna, The Shanker Hotel (Heritage hotel: formerly a Rana Palace), the four star hotels, Hotel Vaishali, Hotel Narayani, The Blue Star, Hotel Sherpa, Grand Hotel, The Malla Hotel, Shangri-La Hotel, Woodlands Dynasty Plaza, Royal Singi Hotel and Hotel Woodlands and the 3 star The Garden Hotel, Hotel Ambassador and Aloha Inn and many others budget hotels, Hotel Blue Horizon.Hotels like The Hayyat and The Solti are also famous which provide casinos as well to entertain their customers and make huge profits on this account.

== See also ==
- Tourism in Kathmandu
- Tourism in Nepal
- Tourism in Lumbini Province
