= Dharahara =

Tower in the Sundhara area of Kathmandu, Nepal

- धरहरा (Nepali)
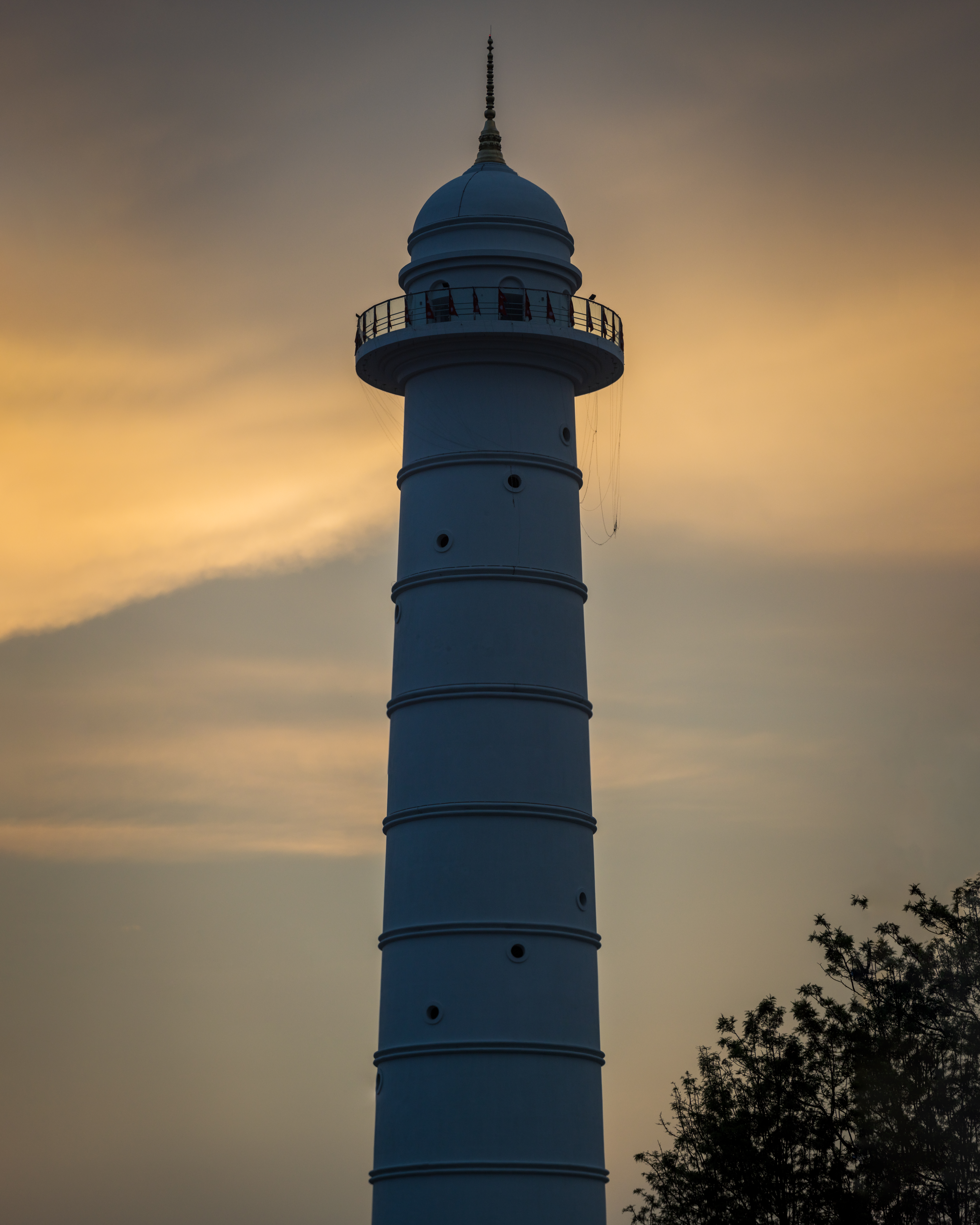
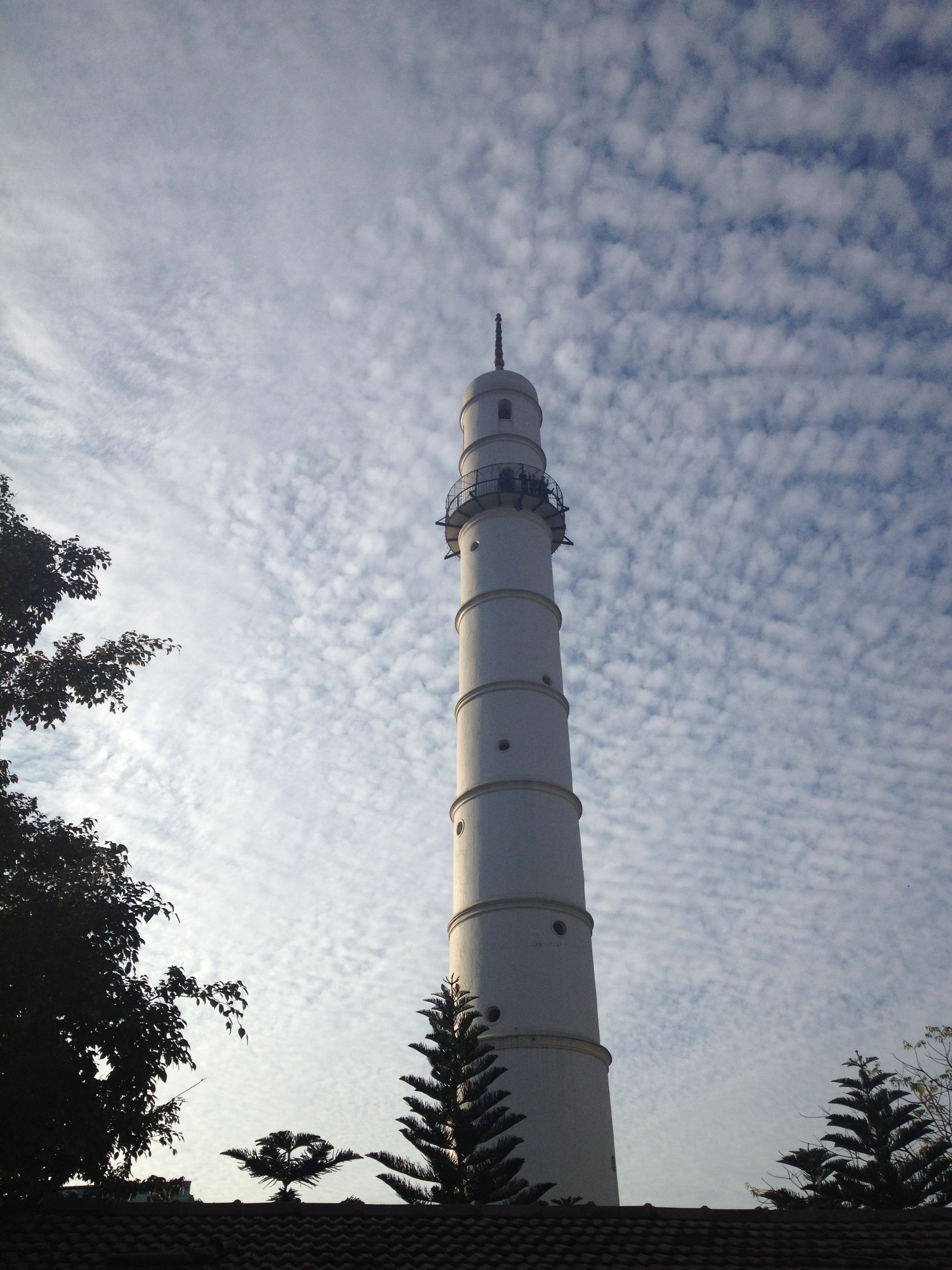
- Reconstructed Dharahara Original Dharahara (Pre-2015 earthquake)

- Location within Kathmandu Location within Bagmati Province Location within Nepal
- Alternative names: Bhimsen Tower

General information
- Status: Complete (reconstructed)
- Architectural style: Mughal and neoclassical style
- Location: Sundhara, Kathmandu, Nepal, Nepal
- Coordinates: 27.7007°N 85.3119°E
- Completed: 1832; 194 years ago or later
- Destroyed: 15 January 1934; 92 years ago (1934 earthquake; two of the original nine storeys remained); 25 April 2015; 11 years ago (2015 earthquake; a 10-metre-tall (33 ft) stump of the base remained)

Height
- Height: 72 metres (236 ft)

Design and construction
- Architect: Debendra Nepal

Website
- https://dharahara.gov.np/

Ticket Counter.

Dharahara or Bhimsen Stambha (Nepali: धरहरा; pronounced [dʱʌɾʌɦʌɾa] or [dʱʌɾʌːɾa]), is a 72-metre-tall (236 ft) tower at the centre of Sundhara, Kathmandu, Nepal. It was first built in 1832 by Mukhtiyar (equivalent to Prime Minister) Bhimsen Thapa under the commission of Queen Lalit Tripurasundari and was a part of the architecture of Kathmandu recognized by UNESCO. It has been destroyed and reconstructed several times.

The tower has a spiral staircase containing 213 steps. The eighth floor holds a circular balcony for observers that provides a panoramic view of the Kathmandu Valley. It also has a 5.2-metre (17 ft) bronze mast on the roof.

Most of the tower collapsed in the April 2015 Nepal earthquake, but the base remained. A total of 180 bodies were retrieved from the debris of the tower after the earthquake. Reconstruction of the tower commenced in October 2018, and it was partially opened on 24 April 2021, one day before the sixth anniversary of the earthquake. However, construction work on the tower continued until September 2024.

== History ==
Dharahara with Mountain Range

Dharahara in Kathmandu was the tallest building in Nepal and the second such tower built by Bhimsen Thapa. The first tower was built eight years earlier in 1824 (1881 BS) at his residence, Janarala Bagh, situated at south-east of Sundhara, near Bhotebahal of Kathmandu. It got torn in half during the earthquake of 1834 and was never rebuilt. It was only a year later (in 1835) that Bhimsen Thapa built the second Dharahara, along with the Sundhara (the golden water spout), for Queen Lalit TripuraSundari Devi, who was the niece of Bhimsen Thapa.

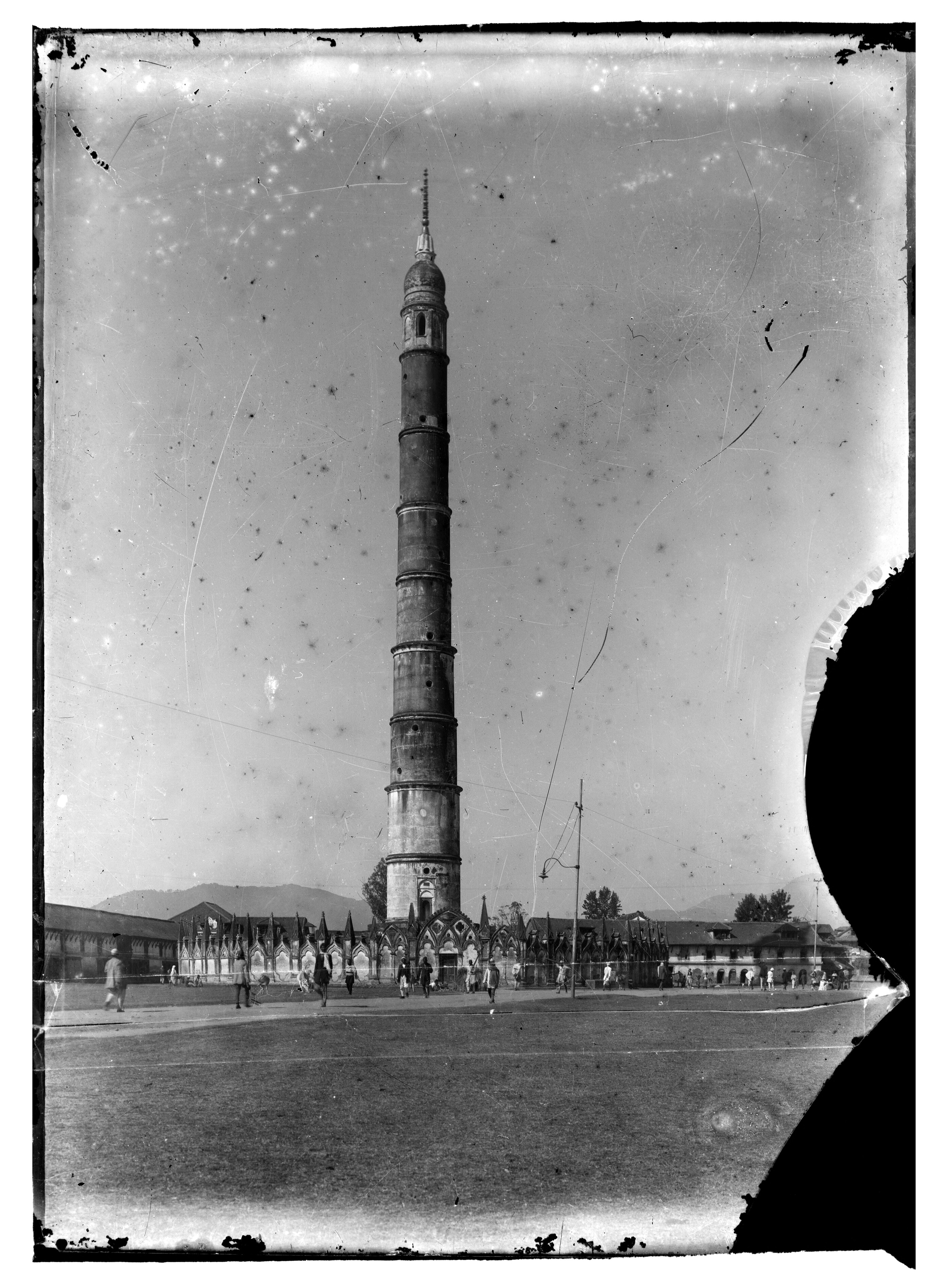
Dharahara in 1910

A century later, on 15 January 1934, another earthquake completely destroyed the first tower, and only two of the nine storeys of the second tower remained. The then Prime Minister of Nepal, Juddha Shumsher Jang Bahadur Rana, subsequently carried out renovation work of the Dharahara tower to fully restore it. After the original Bhimsen Tower was destroyed, Queen Lalit Tripurasundari's tower came to be known as Bhimsen Stambha (Nepali: भिमसेन स्तम्भ, lit. 'Bhimsen Tower').

The second tower was built in honour of Bhimsen Thapa's feat of taking Nepal's land back in the war. King Rajendra Bikram Shah had given a lalmohar (a document with the royal seal) to Bhimsen Thapa in 1835, acknowledging his Commander-in-Chief status and building of Dharahara in Sundhara in 1824, in his honour.

Dharahara was constructed for military usage as a watchtower. When incidents of national importance occurred, bugles were blown from the top floor of the tower. This was the signal for soldiers to assemble. This tradition of bugle trumpeting continued until the collapse of the tower. On one of the sign boards at Dharahara, it is stated that the Dharahara's main purpose was to enable the state and city authorities to summon people to gather on the Tundikhel (the military parade ground to the northeast of the tower) to hear government announcements, and that it showed ‘the religious harmony between Hindu, Muslim and Christian faiths.'

== 2015 earthquake ==
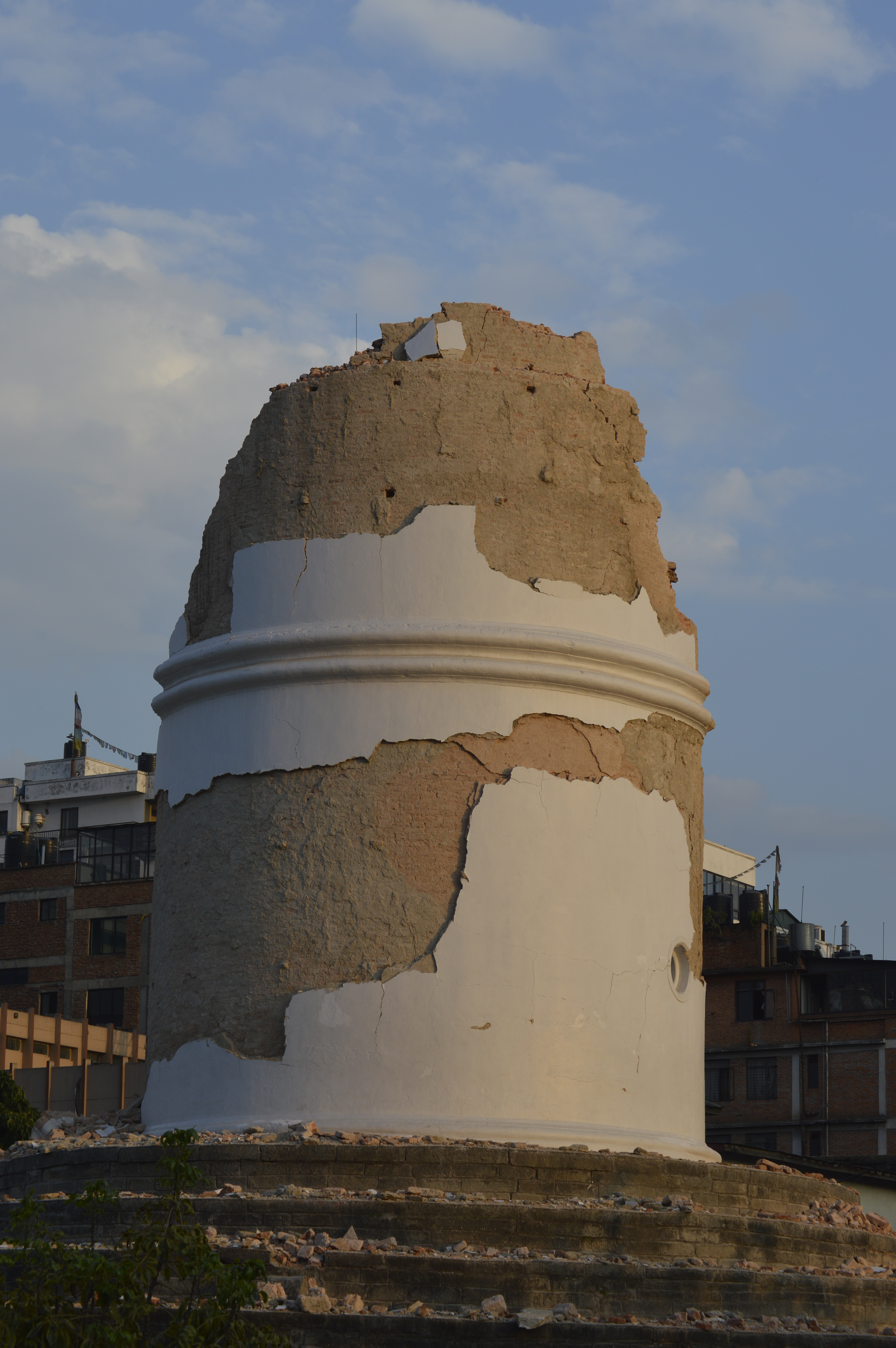
The remains of Dharahara (Reconstructed by Juddha Shumser in 1935) after the 2015 earthquake

On 25 April 2015, at 11:56 NST, an earthquake with an estimated magnitude of 7.8 (M_{w}), hit Kathmandu and its surrounding region, leading to the collapse of the tower. The structure collapsed during lunch hour and only its base survived. According to witnesses, the area was covered with clouds of smoke and in the rubble was heard shouting. The Nepalese Army barricaded the entrance and launched the rescue mission. Some of the bricks from the tower's remains were inscribed with the name of Juddha Shumsher, indicating that it was rebuilt during his tenure.

In February 2016, the government decided to rebuild the tower, and Prime Minister KP Sharma Oli and his cabinet ministers contributed one month's salary to the rebuilding. A fund called "I will construct Dharahara" was also established to collect money for the reconstruction. According to Sushil Gyawali, chief executive of the National Reconstruction Agency, the new tower would be earthquake-resistant. The foundation stone of the new tower was laid down on 27 December 2018.

== Reconstruction and inauguration ==
The original tower, built by the first prime minister of Nepal Bhimsen Thapa, was destroyed in the 1934 earthquake. Rana Prime minister Juddha Sumsher Rana constructed the second which was destroyed in the April 2015 earthquake. The reconstruction of the monument took place under the coordination of the National Reconstruction Authority.

Reconstruction of the tower began in October 2018. The inauguration ceremony was organized for the eve of the sixth anniversary of the Gorkha earthquake. Prime Minister KP Sharma Oli inaugurated the historical Dharahara (Bhimsen Stambha/ Dharahara) on 24 April 2021, in Sundhara, Kathmandu.

Despite the inauguration ceremony, construction work on the tower continued with the full opening in September of 2024.

== Architecture ==
The architecture of Dharahara is designed in both Mughal and European style. It is widely believed that the original towers were modelled on monuments in India such as the minarets that stand at the four corners of the Taj Mahal complex at Agra, or the Qutb Minar in Delhi. Bhimsen Thapa was a known admirer of the Mughal style as is evident by his palace, now demolished, which was Mughal in style with a fair amount of Kathmandu Gothic thrown in. The main materials used in the tower construction were Vajra-Surki (Brick dust), Chuna (Lime), Maas (Black lentil) and Chaaku (Caramel). The combination of these materials are considered to be much stronger than the common cement used nowadays.

== Before collapse ==
The tower was a major tourist attraction and was open to the public from 2005 until its collapse in 2015. The management of Dharahara before 2015 came under heavy scrutiny from locals and tourists. The Heritage Department of Kathmandu Metropolitan City was criticized for its lack of effort to protect the heritage site.

== New Dharahara Tower ==
In April 2021, the newly rebuilt Dharahara stands as a 22-story structure with modern features. It includes a museum, a garden, and a fountain nearby, along with two lifts and underground parking for 350 four-wheelers and 6,000 two-wheelers. It retains the traditional minaret shape and has a bronze mast on the roof, similar to the original design. The tower officially opened to the public on 19 September 2024, the Constitution Day of Nepal.

== Gallery ==
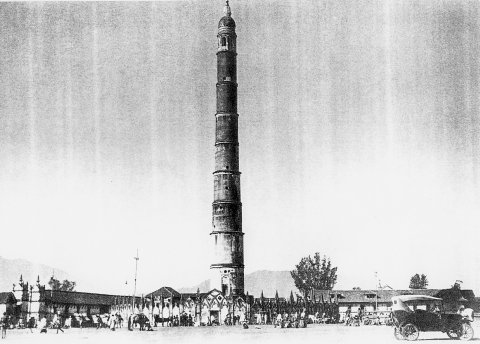
The original Dharahara before the 1934 earthquake

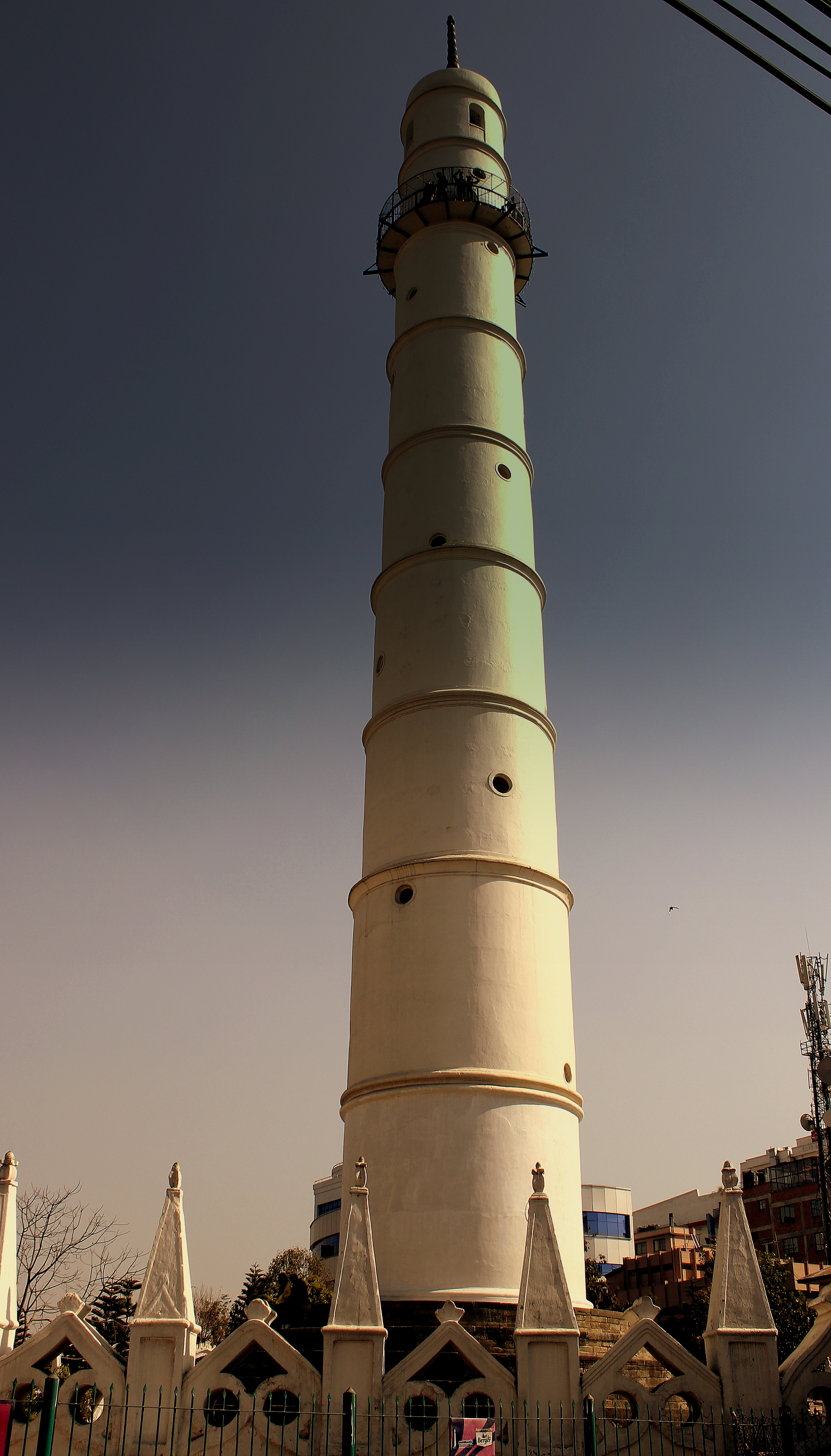
The second Dharahara before the 2015 earthquake

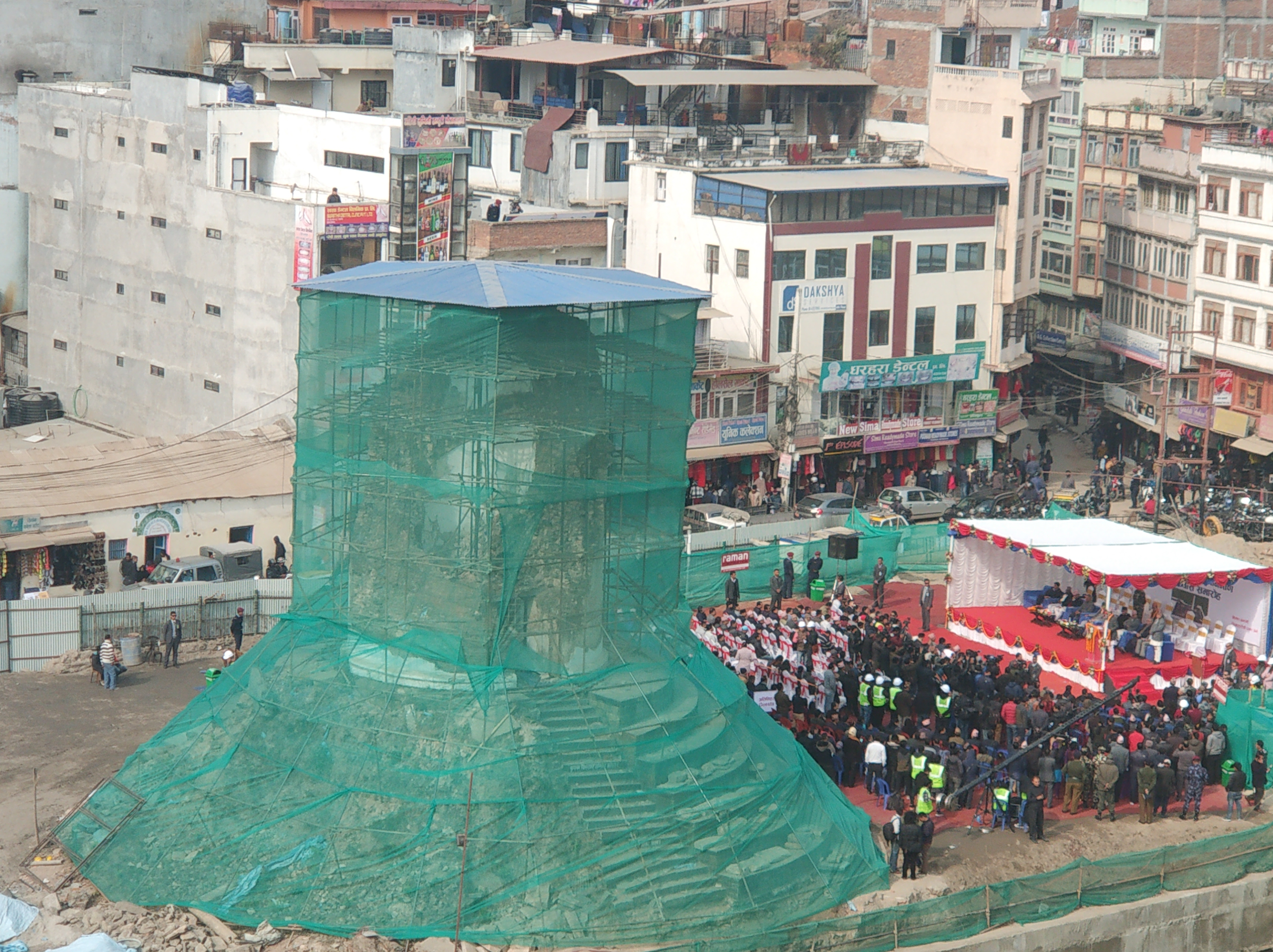
The remains of Dharahara preserved under safety netting

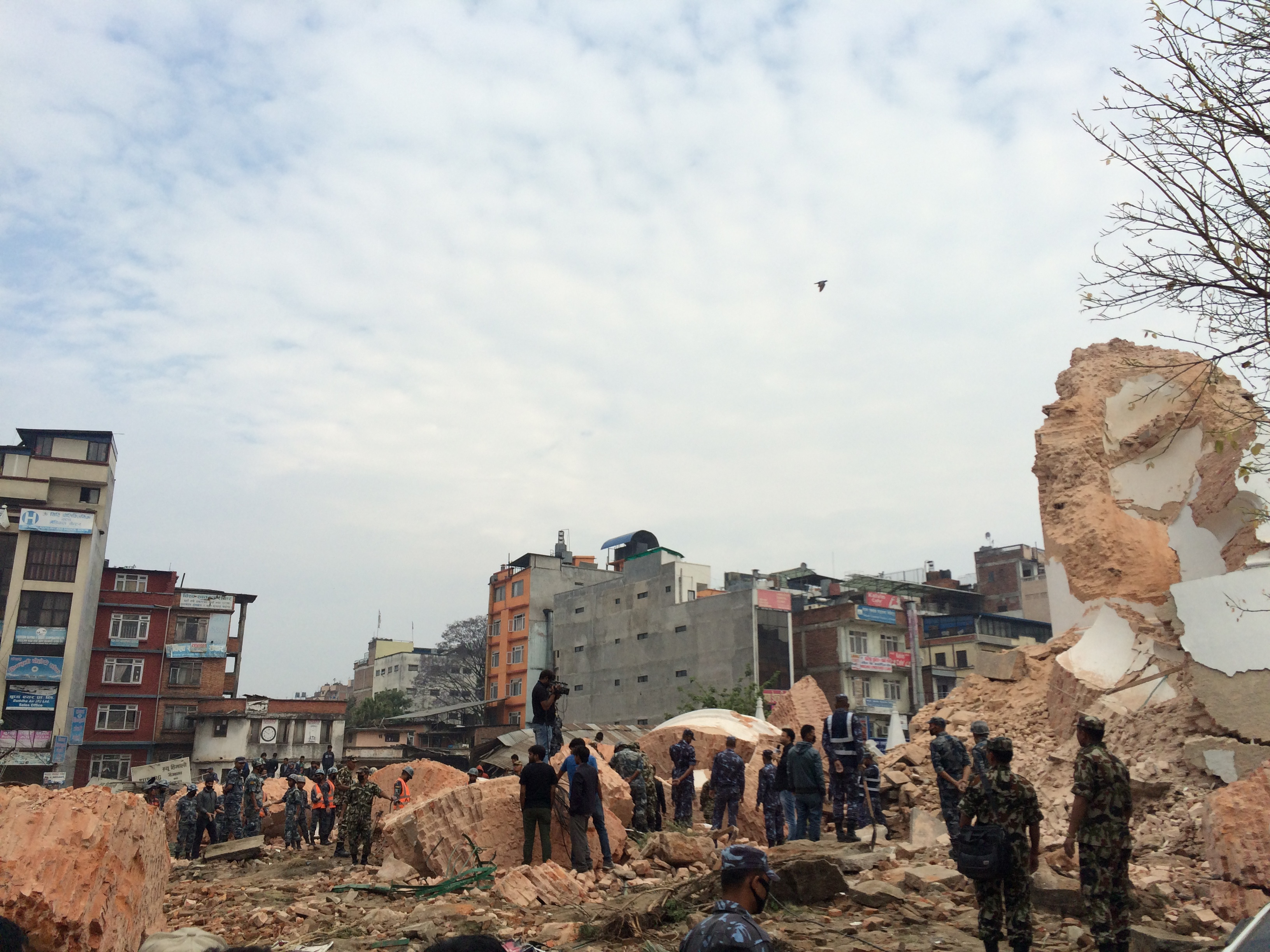
Evacuation from under the rubble of Dharahara after the 2015 earthquake

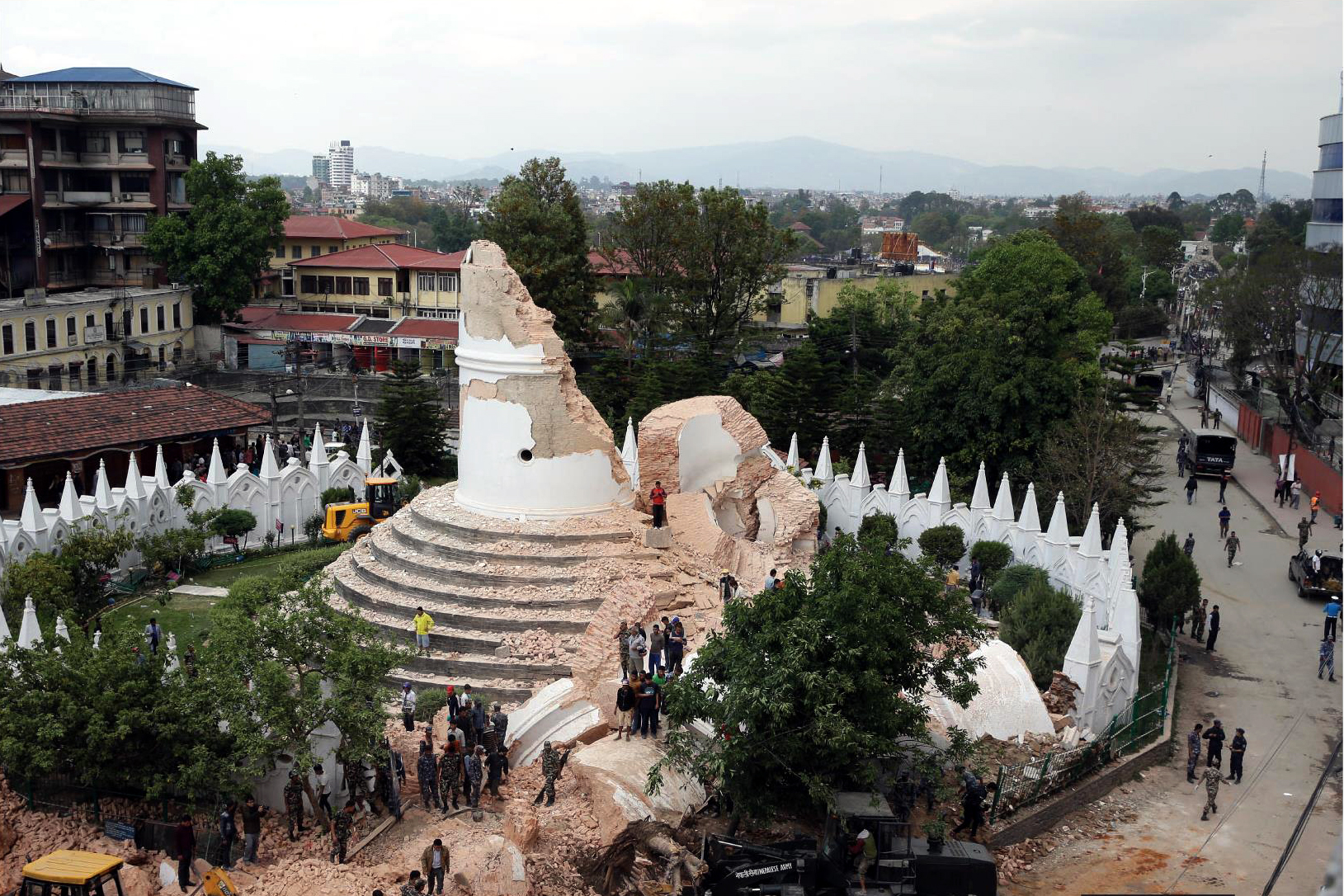
The remains of Dharahara after the 2015 earthquake

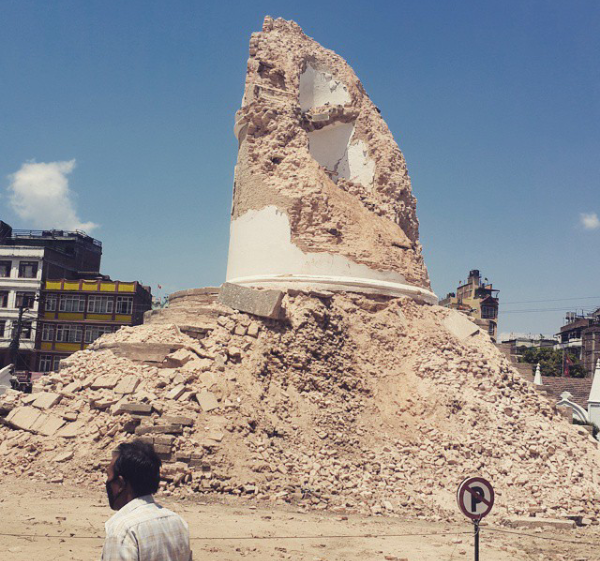
The remains of Dharahara after the 2015 earthquake

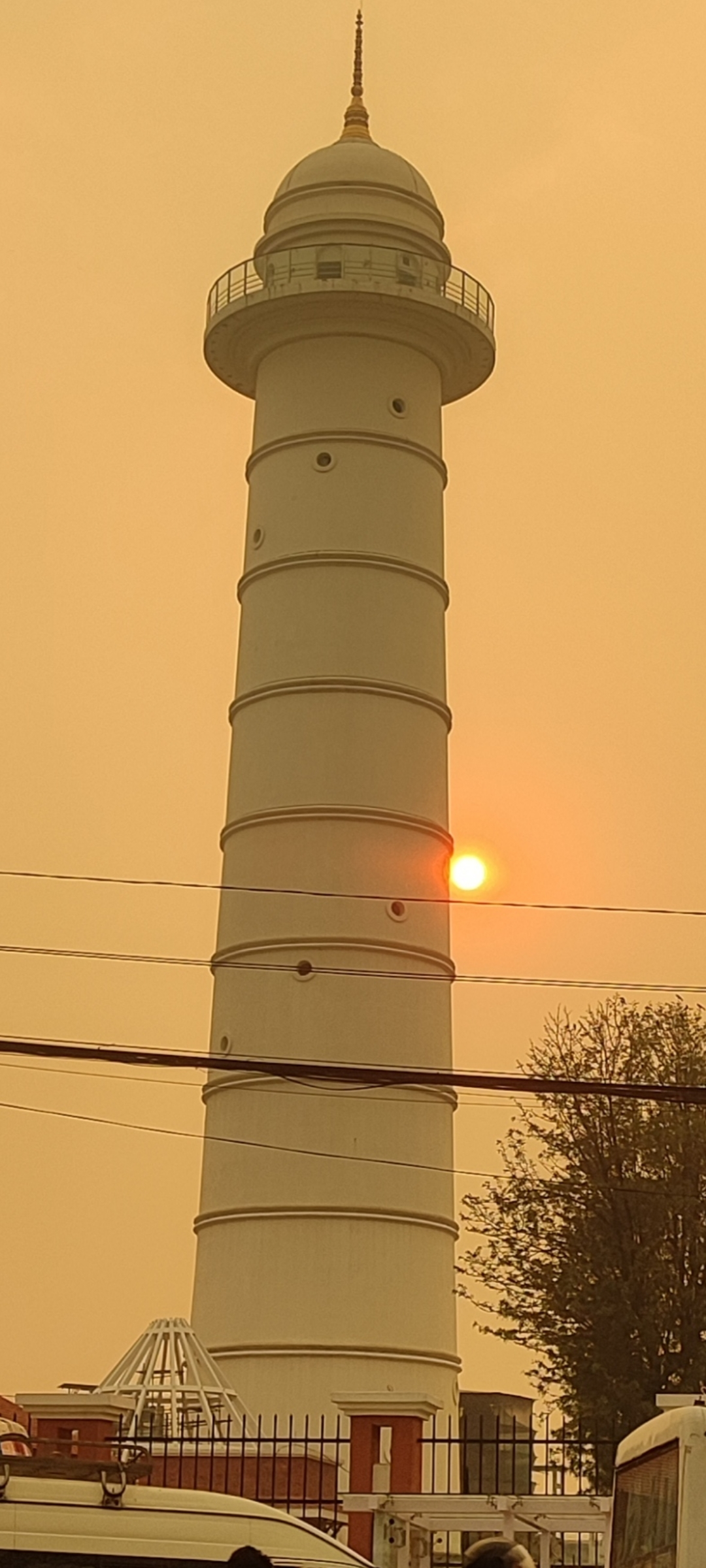
Twilight sun peeking through the window of the iconic Dharahara

== See also ==
- List of destroyed heritage
- Architecture of Kathmandu
- April 2015 Nepal Earthquake
