= Tourism in Kathmandu =

Tourism in the capital city of Nepal

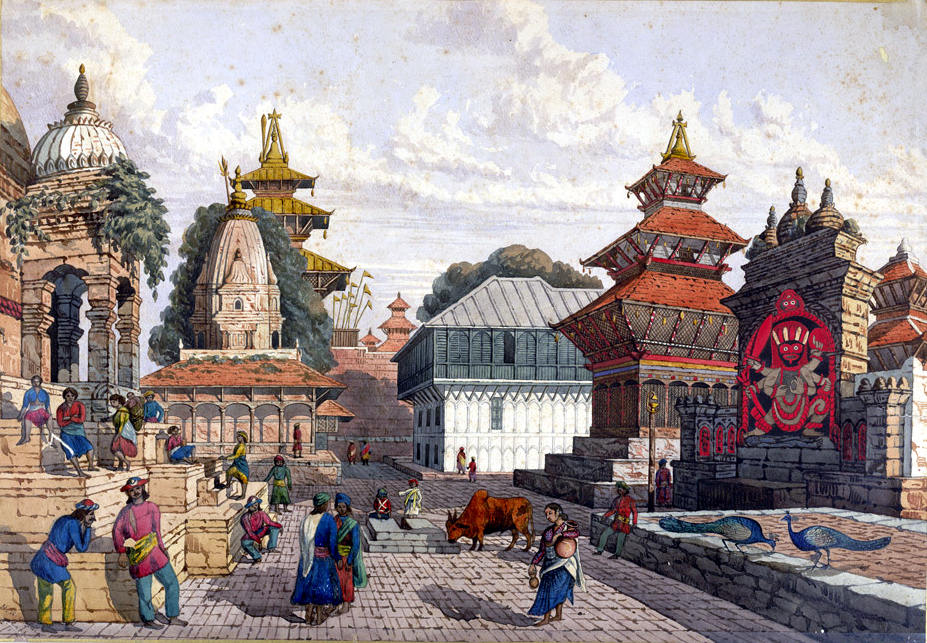
Kathmandu Durbar Square, 1852

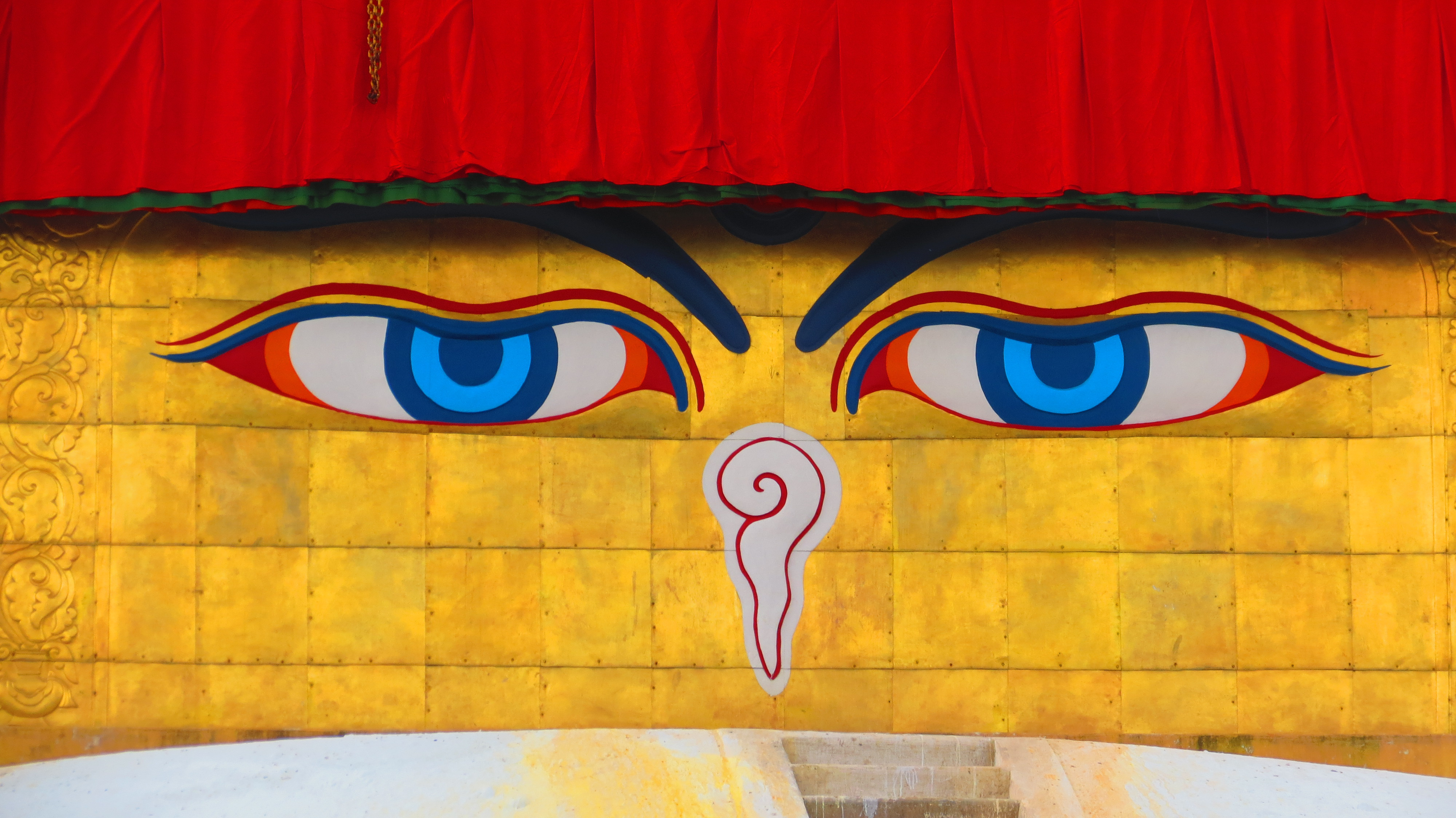
The eyes of Boudhanath, a UNESCO World Heritage, associated with the relics of Kassapa Buddha and Shakyamuni Buddha

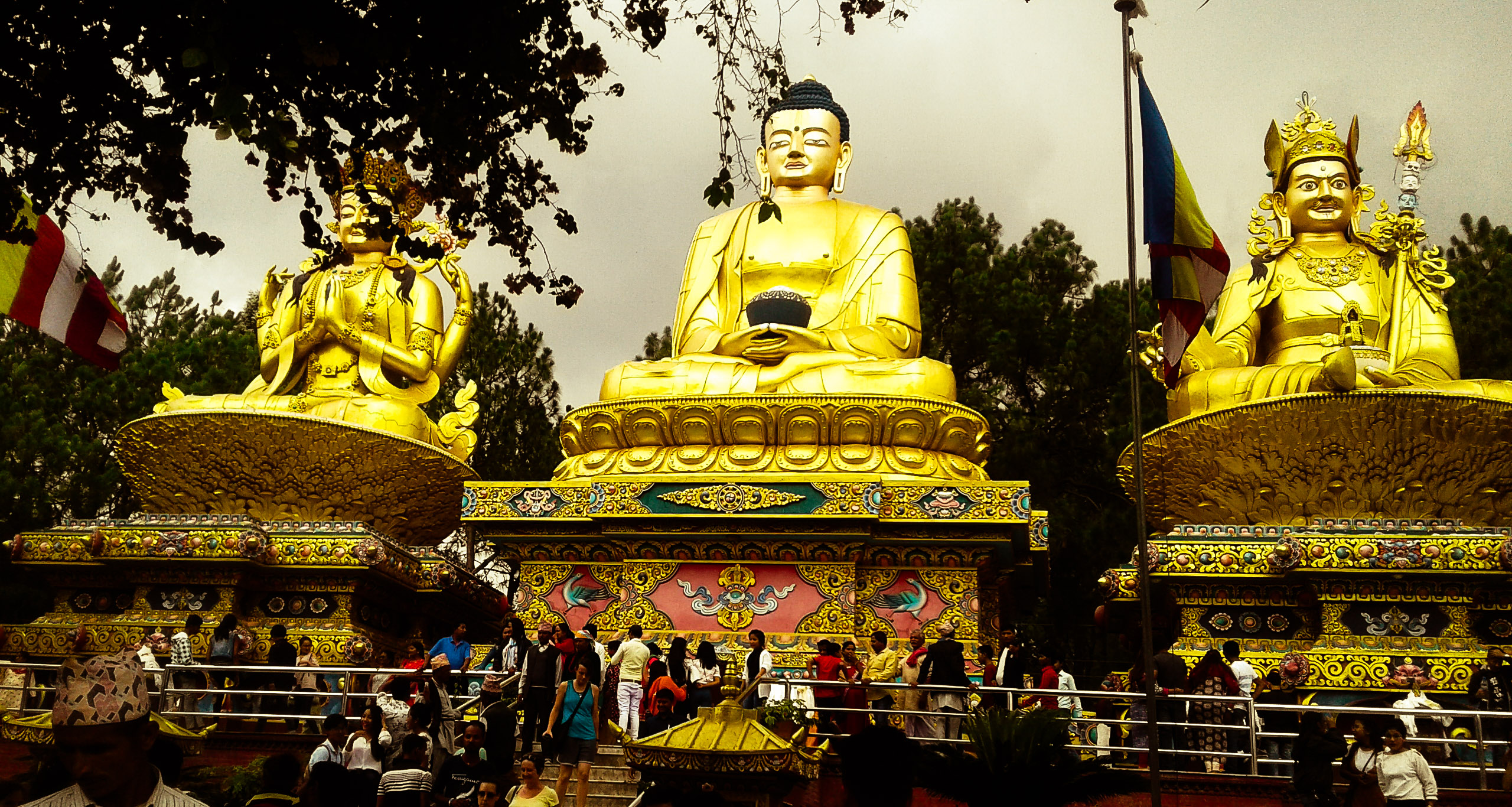
Seated Buddha statues in Swayambhunath, one of the ancient pilgrimage sites of Kathmandu

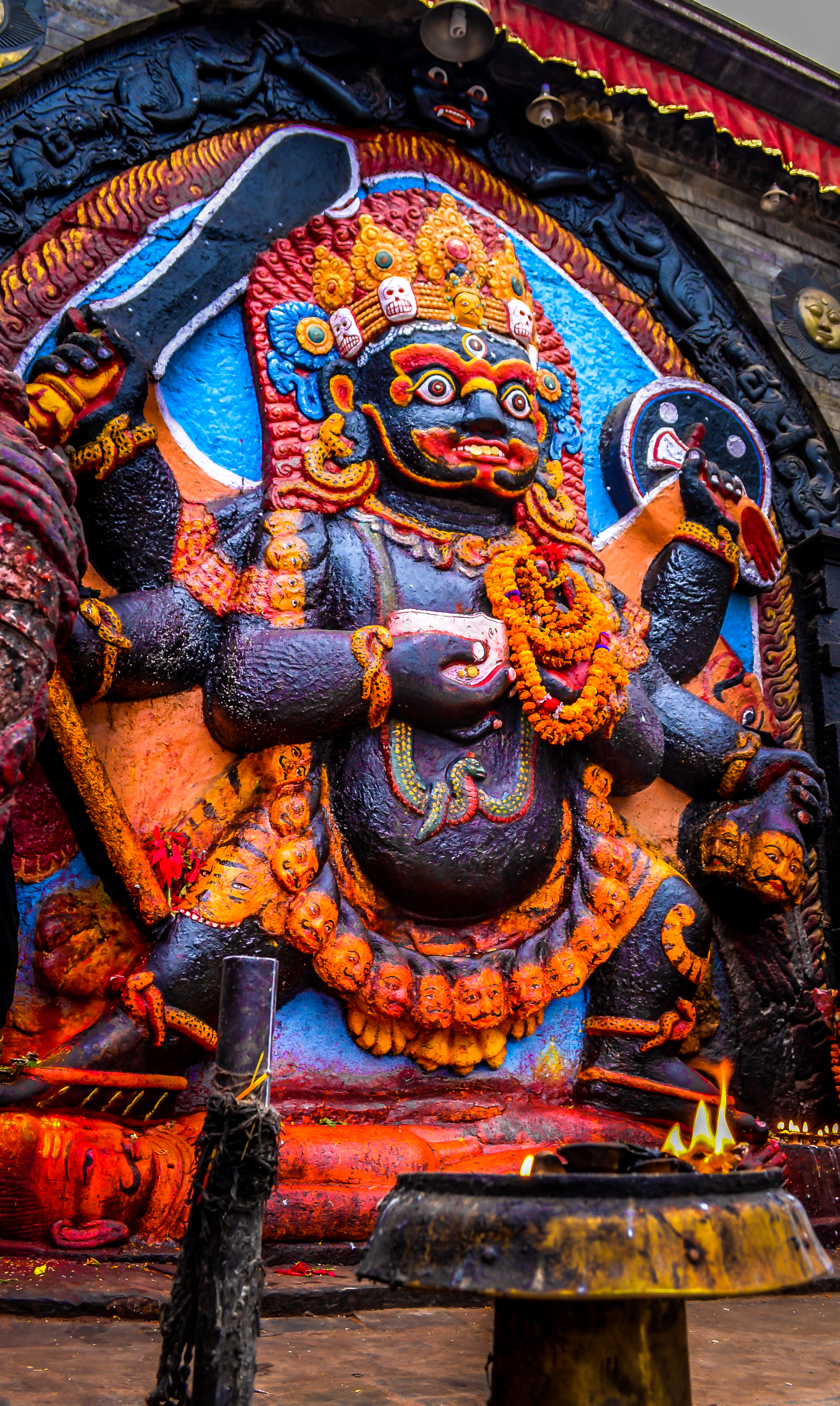
Temple of Kala Bhairava, a fearsome form of Shiva, worshipped by both Hindus and Buddhists as the 'lord of time and death' at Hanumandhoka palace of Malla era

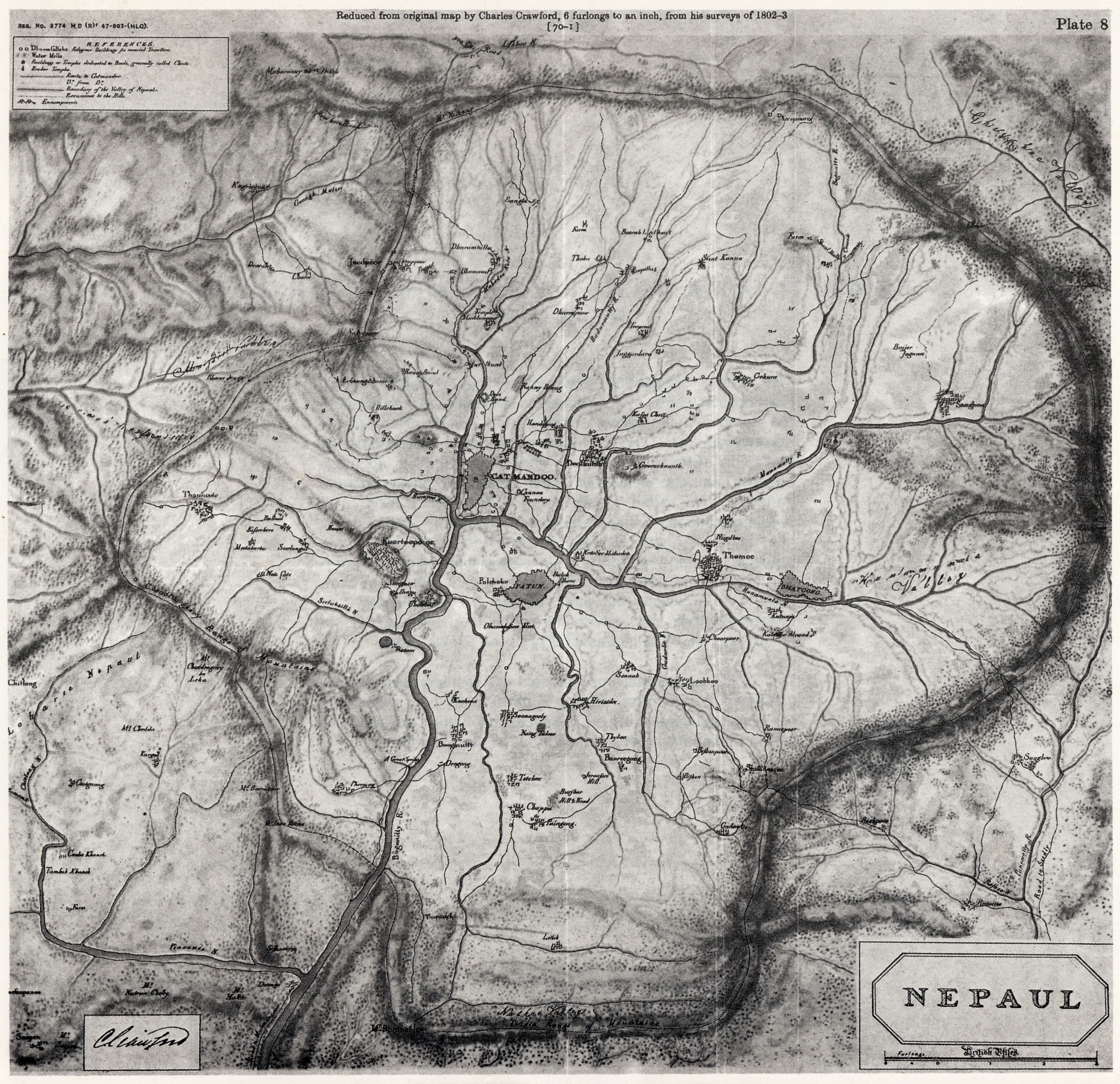
Scan of map of Nepaul, present-day Kathmandu Valley and surrounding areas in Nepal, reduced from original map by Francis Buchanan-Hamilton and Charles Crawford from surveys in 1802.

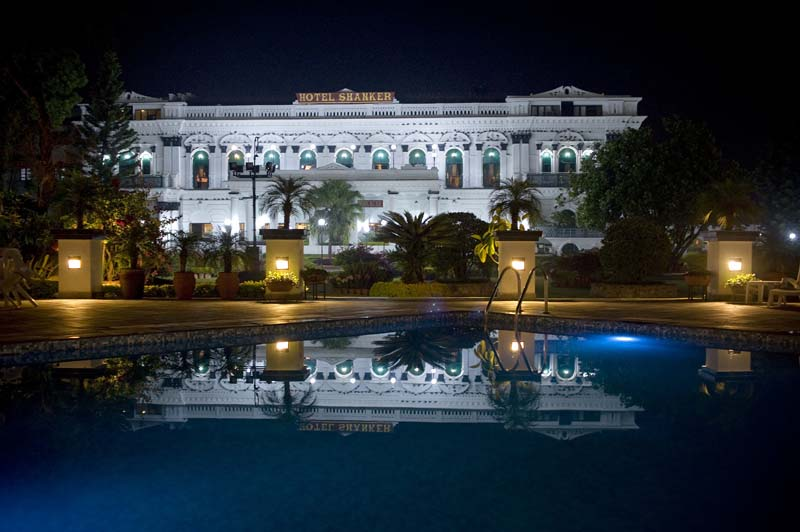
Hotel Shanker is one of the city's popular heritage hotels

Tourism in Kathmandu, the capital of Nepal is considered an important industry. In 1956, air transportation was established and the construction of Tribhuvan Highway, between Kathmandu and Raxaul, was started. Separate organizations were created in Kathmandu to promote the tourism industry, including the Tourism Development Board, the Department of Tourism, and the Civil Aviation Department. Furthermore, Nepal became a member of several international tourist associations. Establishing diplomatic relations with other nations further accentuated this activity. The hotel industry, travel agencies, the training of tourist guides, and targeted publicity campaigns are the chief reasons for the significant growth of this industry in Nepal and in Kathmandu in particular.

Tourism is a major source of income for most of the people in the city, with several hundred thousand visitors annually. Hindu and Buddhist pilgrims from all over the world visit Kathmandu's religious sites such as Pashupatinath Temple, Swayambhunath, Boudhanath, Changu Narayan Temple, and Budhanilkantha Temple. From a mere 6,179 tourists in 1961/62, the number increased to 491,504 in 1999/2000. In economic terms, the foreign exchange registered 3.8 percent of the GDP in 1995/96 but then started declining. Following the end of Nepalese Civil War, there was a significant rise in the number of tourist arrivals, with 509,956 tourists recorded in 2009. Since then, tourism has improved as the country transitioned into a republic. The high level of tourism is attributed to the natural grandeur of the Himalayas and the cultural heritage of the country which is continuously preserved and restored at great cost.

With the opening up of the tourist industry after a change in the political situation in Nepal in 1950/51, the hotel industry drastically improved. Now Kathmandu boasts several luxury hotels with some including casinos. Ason is a bazaar and ceremonial square on the old trade route to Tibet.

== Tourist neighbourhoods ==
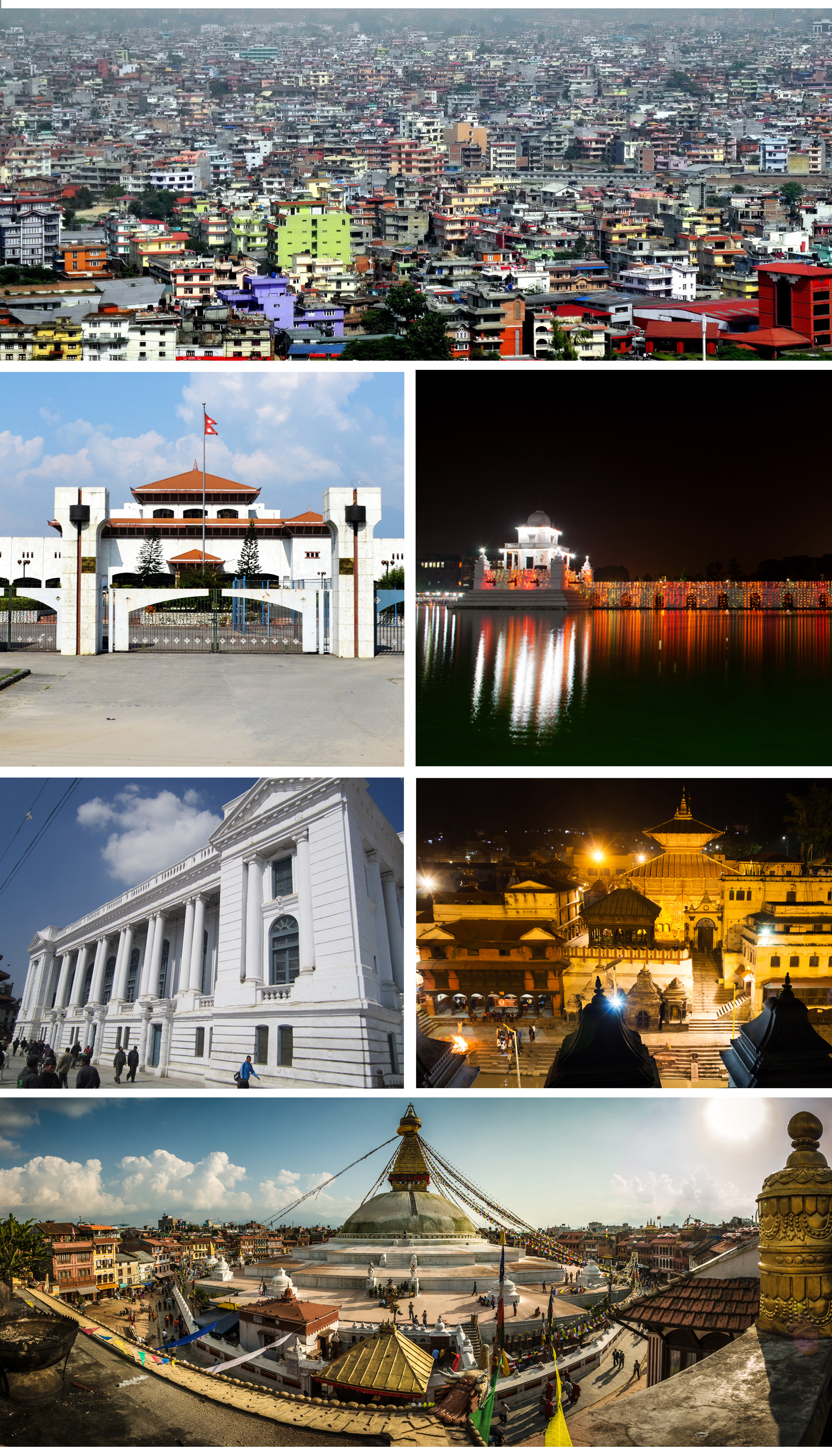
Kathmandu Metropolis

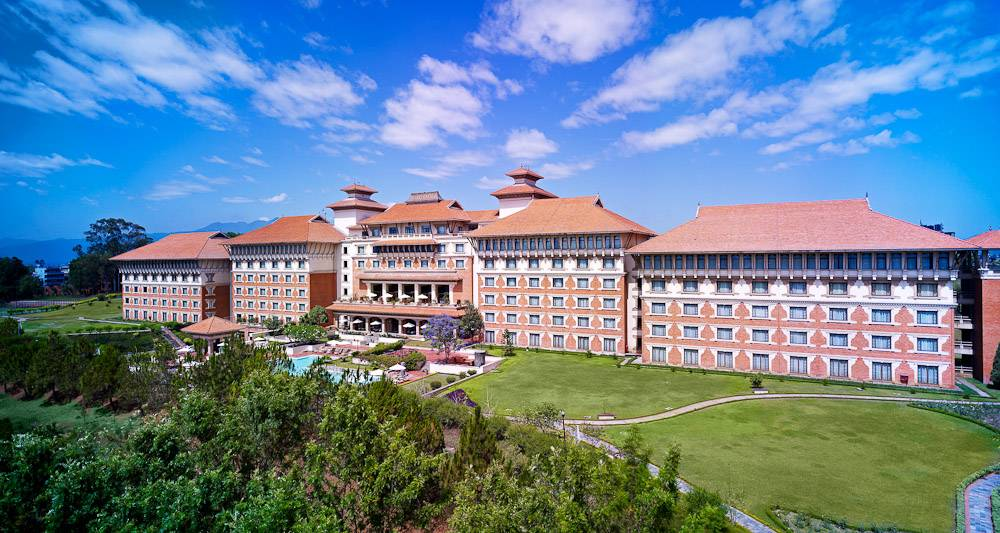
Hyatt Regency Kathmandu

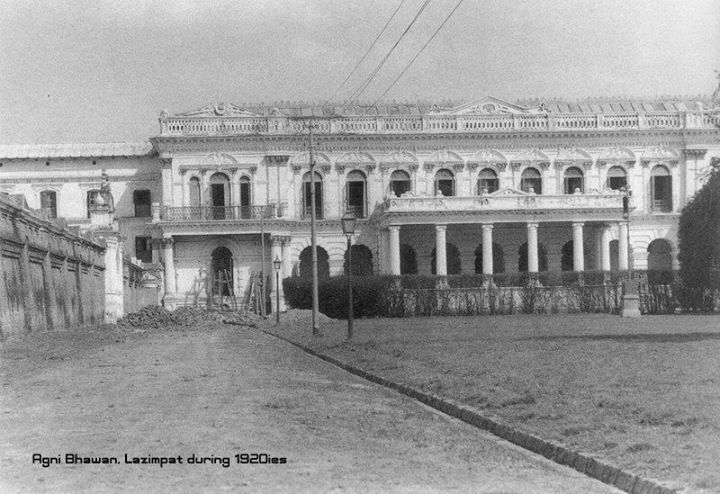
Official photo of Agni Bhawan from the 1920s, now part of Hotel Shanker Kathmandu

- The neighbourhood of Thamel is Kathmandu's primary go-to place for tourists and is widely regarded as the center of Kathmandu's nightlife, packed with guest houses, restaurants, shops, and bookstores, catering to tourists.
- Another neighbourhood of growing popularity is Jhamel, a short form of Jhamsikhel which was coined to rhyme with Thamel.
- Jhochhen Tol, also known as Freak Street remains a traveler haunt. This original meeting place for international guests in Kathmandu became known in the 1960s and 1970s through folklore told by hippies in Europe and North America.
