= Shirish Devkota =

Nepalese folk singer

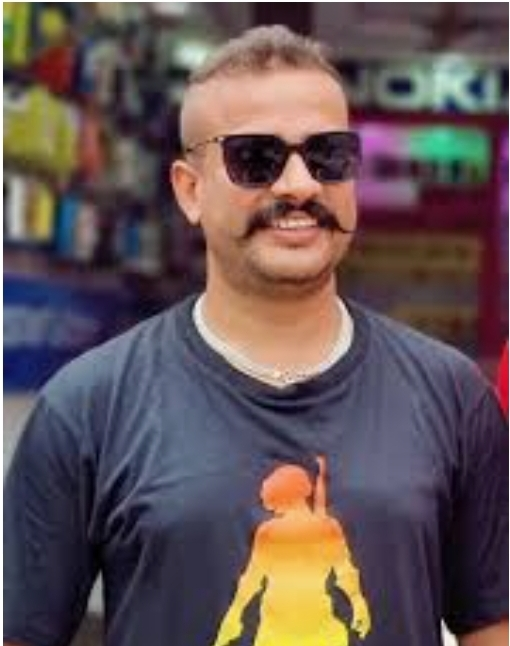

Background information
- Born: 17 July 1985 (age 41); Baganaashakali-5, Darlamdanda, Nepal
- Genres: folk, Roila
- Occupations: Folk singer and Roila
- Instruments: vocals; harmonium; madal
- Years active: 2003–present

Harihar Devkota known professionally as Shirish Devkota (born 17 July 1985) is a Nepalese folk singer. He has released 20 of his albums and provided vocals for at least 100 more including Karuwa ma pani, Ma Ta Aaune Thina, Durga Hau Ki Bhawani, Maya launa milchha ra, Chhoro America Chha, Antim Bhet, Chanchara, Pyauli Palai chha, Baina Hajura . However, his roila song (a form of Nepali folk music) Ma Ta Aaune Thina Yahi Chal Hola Bhanya Bha, released in 2008, brought him to the limelight.

== Early life ==
He was born in Baganashakali–5, Darlamdanda, Palpa. Devkota is the son of Surya Prasad Devkota and Tulka Devi Devkota. He has two elder brothers Shambhu Prasad Devkota and Bharat Mani Devkota Born in a small village, Devkota moved to the capital, Kathmandu, to become a doctor, in 2000, where he later started singing. He released his first song Manko Kuro in 2003. In 2013, Devkota and Pashupati Sharma both became Secretary of the National Folk and Duet Song Academy, Nepal. Most of his songs revolve around patriotism, love, and the social situation of his country. His 2019, song Chhoro America chha was about the current situation of Nepal, where most people going abroad for higher studies do not return.

== Education ==
Devkota has completed a Master of Business.

== Connecting the film and folk song industries ==
Devkota has worked to connect Nepalese folk songs and the local film industry. For example, in 2015 during his stage performance on Palpa Mahotsav, he made Nepalese actor Rajesh Hamal dance in his song. In his song, Chhoro America chha which was released in 2019 Neer Shah acted as a father of a son who does not return from abroad. In his song "Chaachara", which was released in 2018 he worked with actor Dilip Rayamajhi, who danced to the song. In his song "Chautari", released in 2020 he worked with Bandana Nepal, who danced to his song. She holds the Guinness World Record for dancing at 126 hours.)

== Awards ==
Year	Award	Category	Result	Ref.
2011	Hits FM (Nepal)	Folk Album of the Year	Nominated	
2013	Kalika FM	Life Time Achievement	Nominated	
2014	Kalila FM	Best Folk Duet lyrics	Won	
2017	Kalila FM	Best Folk music composition	Won	
2021	Bindabasini Music Award	Best male Dohori singer	Won	

== Discography ==
- Ma Ta Aaune Thina Yehi Chal hola Vanya Bha - with Devi Gharti Magar
- Durga hau ki bhawani - with Komal Oli
- Chhoro America chha - with Samjhana Bhandari
- Kharbari ma janchhu - with Bima Kumari Dura
- Karuwa ma Pani - with Bishnu Majhi
- Ballai Bheta Bhayo - with Devi Gharti Magar
- Chachara -with Rita Thapa Magar
- Chautari - with Devi Gharti Magar
- Yo Dai Feri Aaudaina - with Laxmi Dhakal
- Tirkha Lagey Paani Dhoka Khaye Ka Jaani - with Sunita Dulal
- Talla Ghare Sannani - with Shilu
- Maaf gara -with Bishnu Majhi
