= Bimal Adhikari =

Nepalese musical artist

Bimal Adhikari बिमल अधिकारी
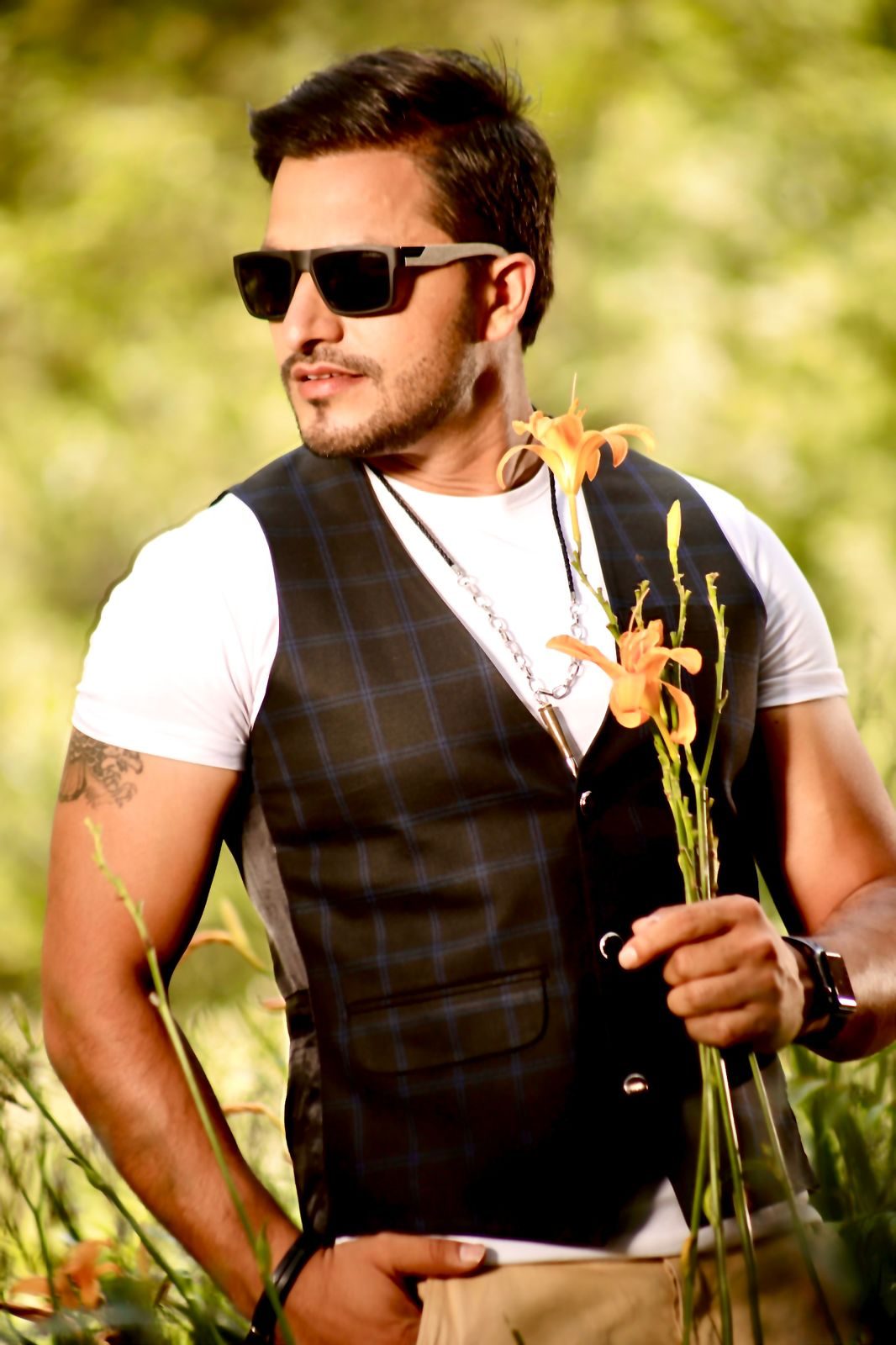

Background information
- Born: 2 April 1990 (age 36); Syangja, Nepal
- Genres: folk
- Occupations: Model, dancer
- Years active: 2010–present

Bimal Adhikari (Nepali: बिमल अधिकारी; born 2 April 1990) is a Nepalese model, dancer, lyricist, and musician. Adhikari was born in Chapakot-Syangja, Nepal. Adhikari came to Kathmandu after completing his SLC where he started working for a marketing company, however after a few years he started taking dance classes which grew his interest in the musical field. Adhikari mainly appears in music videos of Nepali folk and modern songs. His song with Himal Sagar and Anu Chaudhary "A Hora Maya", which he wrote and composed himself, was one of his more successful songs.

== Awards ==
Year	Award	Category	Result	Ref.
2023	Bindabasini Music Award	Best model (male)	Won	
2023	Amini Music Award	Best model (male)	Won	
2022	National Brand Music Award	Best Folk Model	Won	
2019	Bindabasini music Award	Best Folk Duet Couple	Won	
2019	Genius Music Award	Best folk duet Model	Nominated	
2019	Sadhana Music Award	Best folk song Model	Nominated	
2019	Epic Nepal Music Award	Best male folk model	Won	
2018	National Music Award	Best Model	Nominated	
2014	Musickhabar Music Award	Best folk duet model	Won	

== Discography ==
- A Hora Maya - with Himal Sagar
- Pachheuri Lisyo -with Arjun Sapkota, Samikshya Adhikari, Rabin Lamichhane
- Pipa Chheuma Bar -with Prabisha Adhikari
- Kalle Bolayo - with Melina Rai
- A Bhupu Maya
- Ke Bhanau Hajura - with Melina Rai
- Hare Bhagwan Hare - with Bishnu Majhi
- Jhyalaima - with Bishnu Majhi
- Suna Sabaile Suna
- Chhata
- Ke Yesto Huna Lekheko
- Nagara Pir Maya
- Relai salala - with Asmita Rana
- Aaja Bhanda Bholi Maya
- Dodharaima Pareko Chhu Ma Ta
- A Timro Maya
- Kaha Chhau Timi
- Kina Dukchhas Ye Mutu
