= National Folk and Duet Song Academy Nepal =

Organization for dohori singers

- राष्ट्रिय लोक तथा दोहोरीगीत प्रतिष्ठान नेपाल
- Formation: October 2, 2000; 26 years ago
- Type: non-profit organization
- Location: Kathmandu, Nepal
- Members: 4000
- President: Rita Thapa Magar
- Senior vice-president: Pashupati Sharma
- Website: https://lokdohoripratisthan.org.np

National Folk and Duet Song Academy Nepal, also known as Rastriya Lok Tatha Dohori Geet Pratisthan Nepal, (Nepali: राष्ट्रिय लोक तथा दोहोरी गीत प्रतिष्ठान नेपाल) is a non-governmental and nonprofit organization of dohori singers, composers, and artists founded on October 2, 2000. It currently has 72 district-level committees, including 54 district committees, nine valley coordination committees, and nine international branches. Additionally, it has six provincial-level committees, comprising five provincial committees and one valley coordination committee. In July 2025 Academy filed case against songs that allegedly distort and degrade the country's folk traditions.

== History ==
National Folk And Duet Song Academy Nepal was founded on October 2, 2000, during the National Open Dohori Song Competition in Arunkhola under the chairmanship of folk and dohori singer Ambar Birahi Gurung. The academy has previously been chaired by Prajapati Parajuli, Durga Rayamajhi, Purushottam Neupane, Chandra Sharma, Badri Pangeni, and Ramesh BG. As of 2025, the organization is chaired by Rita Thapa Magar.

== List of presidents ==
- Ambar Birahi Gurung
- Prajapati Parajuli
- Durga Rayamajhi
- Purushottam Neupane
- Chandra Sharma
- Badri Pangeni
- Ramesh BG
- Rita Thapa Magar
