= Melancholy (song) =

2017 song sung by 365 Nepali artists, written by Nipesh Dhaka

Song by Madhav Prasad Ghimire and 364 others, see list below
- Language: Nepali
- Released: 2 September 2017
- Recorded: 19 May 2016
- Studio: Radio Nepal
- Length: 33 minutes 49 seconds
- Producer: Laxmi Chapagain

"Melancholy" (Nepali: मिलानकोली) is an environmentally-themed song sung by 365 Nepali artists. This song was intended to promote an environmental message by breaking the Guinness World Records for "Most Vocal Solos in a Song Recording", which it successfully did. It was written, music composed and directed by environmentalist Nipesh Dhaka. The song was recorded as a single on 19 May 2016. The recording sessions were inaugurated by Prime Minister Khadga Prasad Oli at 8 am and continued until 6 pm. The song was released on 2 September 2017 by President Bidya Devi Bhandari at Army Officer's Club, Kathmandu.

== Background and concept ==
Nipesh Dhaka was involved in a variety of environmental research, as well as producing documentaries, including Himalaya Calls (2015), Melancholy (2017), and Rodhan(2017). He visited almost districts of Nepal, and studied the environmental changes in different geological and ecological regions, and how they affected various communities. He also recorded a song by 206 Nepali artists in different studios of Nepal and Mumbai, including Udit Narayan Jha, Madan Krishna Shrestha, Hari Bansha Acharya, Prem Dhoj Pradhan, Vijaya Lama, Dr. Bhola Rijal, Sambhujeet Baskota and Rajesh Payal Rai. At that time he devised the concept for "Melancholy", with 365 artists collaborating on a single day.

The slogan of the song was "Raise Voice, Save Earth". The event was conducted to break the Guinness World Records of "Most Vocal Solos in a Song Recording" and use this to promote awareness of environmental conservation issues. The song was recorded at Radio Nepal by Prakash Kharel. On 1 February 2018, the song was certified by Guinness World Records.

== Documentary ==
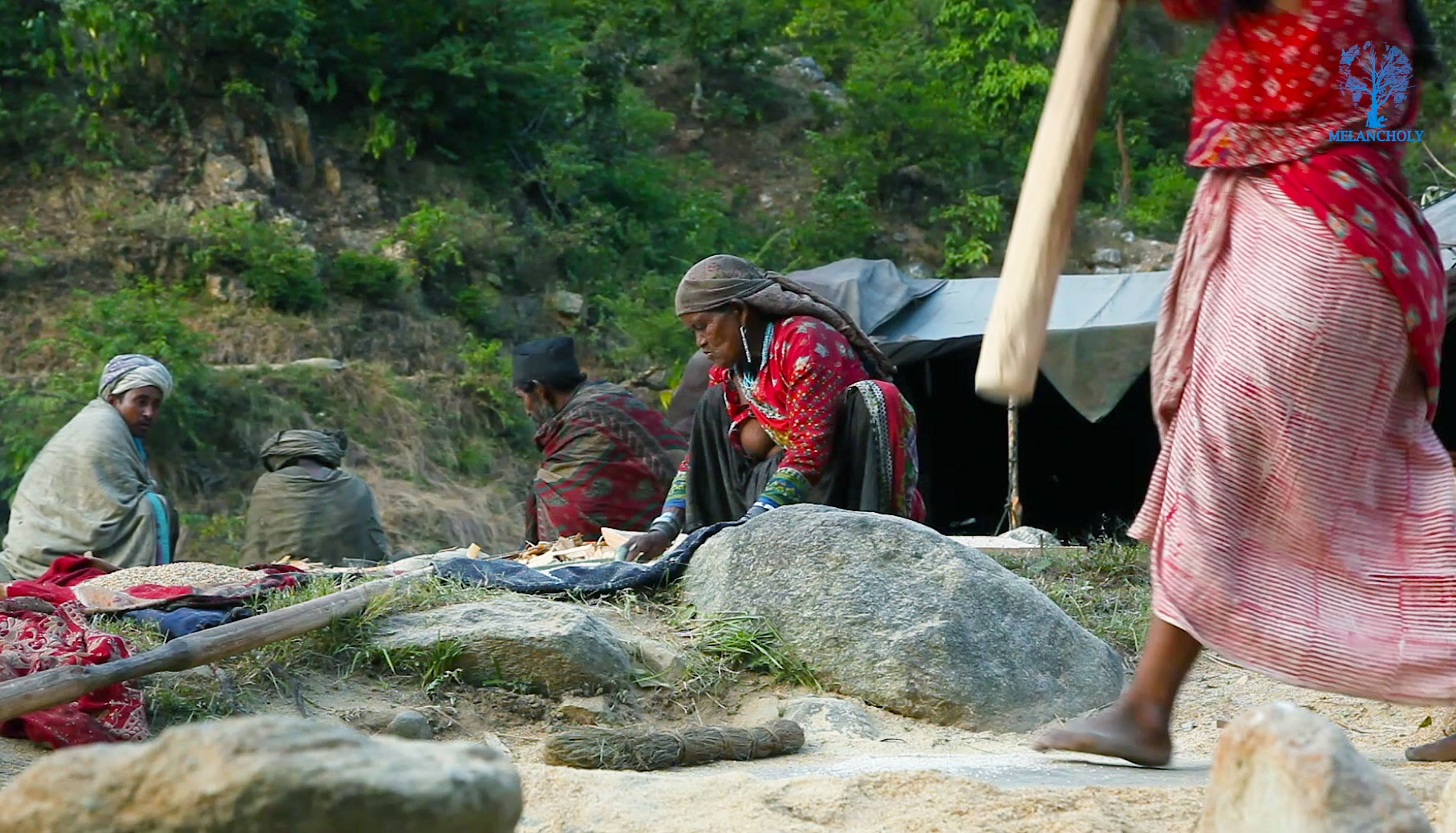
Raute livelihood, Aacham

The documentary Melancholy is based on environmental research studies of all geographical regions of Nepal from 2013 to 2018. The documentary explores how human beings are affecting natural resources. It also addresses global environmental problems, such as declining biodiversity, global warming, and climate change, by examining sustainable development from Nepal's point of view. The 80 minute documentary discusses the nature of the ecosystem, and considers the social impacts of environmental change. It has raised funds for 83 Chepang children of Jaldevi Primary School, Rorang Village, Dhading District. It has also been screened at international conferences and film festivals.

== Guinness World Record achievement ==
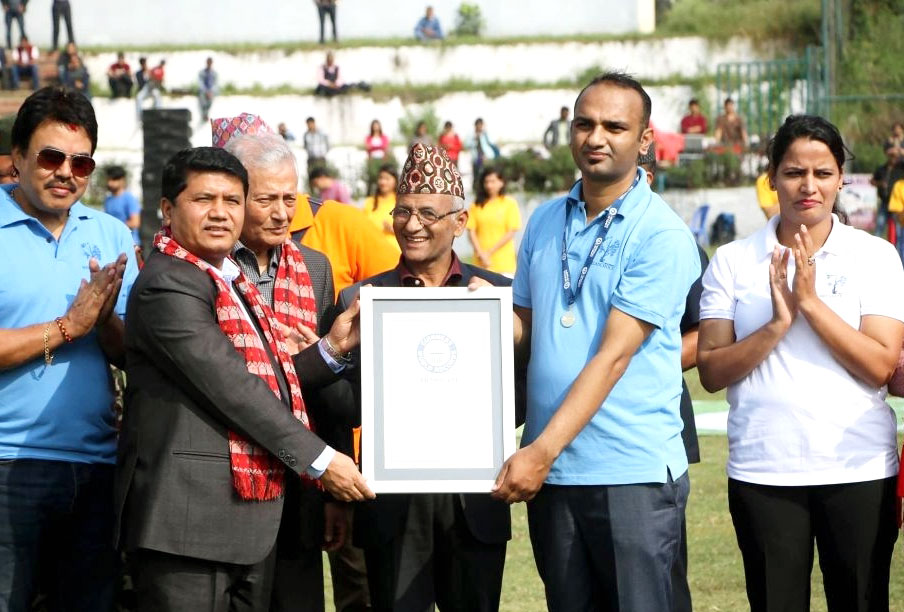
Ceremony at Tribhuvan University International Cricket Ground where the 365 Nepalese artists were presented with the Guinness World Record certificates

All 365 singers along with campaign coordinators, organizers, technicians, and volunteers were awarded Guinness World Records certificates for "Most Vocal Solos in a Song Recording", in collaboration with Nepal's Sustainable Environmental and Ecosystem Management (SEEM). This was done at a ceremony on 11 October 2018 at Tribhuvan University International Cricket Ground, in the presence Minister of Culture, Tourism and Civil Aviation Rabindra Adhikari, veteran scholar Satya Mohan Joshi, and senior singer Prem Dhoj Pradhan.

== Artists ==
The soloists in order of group appearance were:

1. Madhav Prasad Ghimire (national poet of Nepal)

=== Group A: Natural resources ===
2. Nipesh DHAKA
3. Lochan Bhattarai
4. Meera Rana
5. Satya Raj Acharya
6. Sworup Raj Acharya
7. Sangeeta Rana Pradhan
8. Prem Pariyar
9. Manoj Raj Siwakoti
10. Menuka Poudel
11. Chandi Prasad Kafle
12. Anand Karki
13. Hemant Sharma
14. Bhupendra Rayamaji

=== Group B: Agriculture ===
15. Deepak Jangam
16. Kiran Kandel
17. Parbisha Adhikari
18. Munna Gurung
19. Sunita Karki
20. Sahima Shrestha
21. Satya Kala Rai
22. Samjhana Oli
23. Jhuma Limbu
24. Jonisha Poudel
25. Bishwa Nepali
26. Sarita Shahi
27. Rejina Rimal
28. Ajaya Adhikari Sushil
29. Bhabin Dhungana
30. Anuska Pathak

=== Group C: Soil and life ===
31. Pradep Basel
32. CD Vijaya Adhikari
33. Narayan Babu Koirala
34. Bhugol Dahal
35. Manisha Rai
36. Menuka Rai
37. Shantim Koirala
38. Keshab Adhikari
39. Krishna Bashyal
40. Juna Prasai
41. Bhimsen Subedi
42. Kanchan Thalang
43. Parbin Thung Rai
44. Ganga Dhar Parajuli
45. Yogendra Upadhayaya

=== Group D: Mine and industries ===
46. Mahesh Khadka
47. Mechu Dhimal
48. Sudam Thapa
49. Sindhu Malla
50. B.B. Anuragi
51. Prashamsa Shrestha
52. Prashna Sakya
53. Aarati Thapa
54. Manisha Pokharel
55. Hari Lamsal
56. Mahendra Dahal
57. Bidhan Shrestha
58. Swechhya Thakuri
59. Bhanu Bhakta Dhakal
60. Rajan Raj Shiwakoti

=== Group E: Watershed area ===
61. Anil Poudel
62. Anu Dhakal
63. Sudesh Subedi
64. Bidhata Singh Bhattarai
65. Milan Amatya
66. Rai Nabin
67. Bimala Bhusal
68. Rabindra Rai
69. Itu Jojiju
70. Rambhakta Jojiju
71. Shiva Chaudhary
72. Rukman Limbu
73. Suresh Lama
74. Jaljala Pariyar
75. Deepak Limbu
76. Bishhnu Chemjong

=== Group F: Farmer ===
77. Om Bikram Bista
78. Sashi Rawal
79. Shyam Maharjan
80. Radha Rai
81. Suren Chand
82. Aakanshya Basyal
83. Pushpan Pradhan
84. Anil Shahi
85. Shankar Thapa
86. Shreya Sotang
87. Sunil Singh Thakuri
88. Bishal Atreya
89. Kankaist Rai
90. Ciney Gurung
91. Dharmendra Sewan

=== Group G: Renewable energy ===
92. Bharat Sitaula
93. Sitaram Pokharel
94. Kabita Vishwakarma
95. Saru Gautam
96. Durga Pariyar
97. Santosh Shrestha
98. Narayan Oli
99. Rita K. C.
100. Rajeev Lohani
101. Apsara Ghimire
102. Kobid Bajracharya
103. Tika Devi Parsain
104. Prahlad Timilsina
105. Smita Ghimire

=== Group H: Diet and quality ===
106. Rekha Shah
107. Susan Samsohang
108. Hari Gurung
109. Parjeet Lama
110. Pabitra Ghimire
111. Puja Pariyar
112. Bijesh Poudel
113. Uttam Khadka
114. Mausami Gurung
115. Binod Koirala
116. Suresh Manandhar
117. Aashish Diyali
118. Suman Gurung

=== Group I: Health ===
119. Sachin Singh
120. Jeevan Kalapremi
121. Sanjaya Tumrok
122. Kamal Chhetri
123. Suraj Thapa
124. Hari Shankar Chaudhary
125. Sunaj Lamsal
126. Dr. Ranjeet Kumar Jha
127. Ajar Jangam
128. Puja Gurung
129. Sunil Giri
130. Sweta Upreti

=== Group J: Ecosystems ===
131. Shishir Yogi
132. Rewat Rai
133. Urmila Kutu
134. Ram Chandra Kafle
135. Junu Rijal Kafle
136. Suman Sargam
137. Sunita Pradhan Limbu
138. Kamala Sapkota
139. Binod Baniya
140. Tara Laxam Limbu
141. Suman Nepali
142. Kushal Thalang
143. Prem Raj Poudel
144. Basanta Sapkota
145. Ritu Kandel

=== Group K: Forest ecology ===
146. Chetan Sapkota
147. Risu Nepali
148. Laxmi DeviShrestha
149. Kamala Shrestha
150. Raj Kumari Thapa
151. Kishor Kumar Sharma Sedai
152. Prashuram Rijal
153. Sanu Tamang
154. Milan Moktan
155. Ramesh Raj Bhattarai
156. Nisha Deshar
157. Pramod Chandra Prasain
158. Laxmi Risal
159. Sanjeev Aale
160. Tulasi Parajuli
161. Roj Moktan

=== Group L: Human rights ===
162. Indira Joshi
163. Keshav Acharya
164. Prekshya Lamsal
165. Jams Pradhan
166. Deepa Lama
167. Ramesh Pathak
168. Bimal Parajuli
169. Rajesh Kumar Shrestha
170. Samyog Yogi
171. Narayan Acharya
172. Yubraj Chaulagain
173. Phul Kumar Bamjan
174. Parvati Karki

=== Group M: Peace ===
175. Hira Maya Waiba
176. Devi Rokka
177. Deep Tuladhar
178. Fulmaya Darji
179. Ramesh Sangraula
180. Sunny Maharjan
181. Mamata Rai
182. D. R. Atu
183. Romi Basnet

=== Group N: Education ===
184. Komal Oli
185. Rozan Adhikari
186. Babul Giri
187. Tilak Bam Malla
188. Deepak Sharma
189. Jhuma Niraula
190. Dej Raj Poudyal
191. Smriti Shahi
192. Sworupa Rasaily
193. Rajendra Pokhrel
194. Thaneshwor Gautam
195. Biju Bajra
196. Tika Bhandari
197. Desi Pritam Sherpa
198. Madan Gopal
199. Ashok Poudyal

=== Group O: National Property ===
200. Bishnu Khatri
201. Khadga Garbuja
202. Kamali Kanta Bhetuwal
203. Sharmila Gurung
204. Dharma Gandari
205. Krishna Pariyar
206. Bharat Nepali
207. Jeevan Pariyar
208. Bhanu Bhakta Oli
209. Purna Kala B.C.
210. Ramji Khand
211. Nand Krishna Joshi
212. Bidhya Timilsina
213. Bhumika Shah
214. Ganesh Bhandari

=== Group P: Rural livelihood ===
215. Pashupati Sharma
216. Sagar Birahi
217. Bima Kumari Dura
218. Jamuna Rana
219. Tika Pun
220. Sugam Thapa Magar
221. Himal Ghale
222. Manmohan Thapaliya
223. Samjhana Lamichhane Magar
224. Dev Raj Ale Magar
225. Parbati G.C.
226. Madhusudan Thapa
227. Khuman Adhikari
228. Sunita Dulal
229. Radhika Hamal

=== Group Q: Youth ===
230. Nabin Khadka
231. Raju Dhakal
232. Smita Dahal
233. Sarita Thapa
234. Narayan Rayamajhi
235. Devi Gharti Magar
236. Asha Thapa
237. Laxmi Neupane
238. Rosani Rasaili
239. Puja Sunuwar

=== Group R: Natural disaster ===
240. Babu Bogati
241. Amrit Bhatta
242. Babita Manadhar
243. Shristi Sunar
244. Bindu Pariyar
245. Partap Lama
246. Priya Upreti
247. Benuka Rai
248. Rajay Gurung
249. Krishna Reule
250. Sushma B.K.
251. Jhalak Sangraula
252. Raju Singh
253. Kala Rai
254. Yogeshwar Amatya
255. Aakriti Dangal

=== Group S: Human settlement ===
256. Debash Rai
257. Shanti Ram Rai
258. Saru Ban
259. Paras Mukarung
260. Reshma Sunwar
261. Uttam Thapa
262. Amrit Chhetri
263. Simant Santosh
264. Banika Pradhan
265. Sashi Bikram Thapa
266. Shyam Kumar Bishwokarma
267. Bhisan Mukarung
268. Rhythm Kandel
269. Sarada Adhikari
270. Mingma Sherpa
271. Rakesh Oli

=== Group T: Society ===
272. Nirnaya Shrestha
273. Puskal Sharma
274. Ruchi Shrestha
275. Ranjan Adhikari
276. Rajesh Payal Rai
277. Jamuna Sanam
278. Indra R.P.
279. Sanjana Shrestha
280. Binod Rai
281. Araj Keshav
282. Shambu Baniya
283. Arjun Kaushal

=== Group U: Human resource ===
284. Pramod Kharel
285. Arpana Shrestha
286. Kishor Lopchan
287. Pushpa Bohora
288. Shiva Sangit
289. Kamal Kiran
290. Durga Prasad Khanal
291. Narahari Premi
292. Bijaya Biswas Rai
293. Pramod Nirwan
294. Deepak Baraili
295. Malika Karki
296. Prakriti Thalang Limbu
297. Purusottam Poudel
298. Krishna B.K.

=== Group V: Nationalism ===
299. Gayatri Tripathi
300. Prajwal Karki
301. Bhim Limbu
302. Aagantuk Kharel
303. Paras Prakash Nepal
304. Suresh Adhikari
305. Udesh Shrestha
306. Om Prakash Rai
307. Sachin Rai
308. Subash Chamling
309. Nimish Kattel
310. Parkash Saput
311. Suraj Shahi Thakuri
312. Rupak Shrestha
313. Pratap Das
314. Binay Karki Chhetri

=== Group W: Ecological cycle ===
315. Nispal Adhikari
316. Prisha Shrestha

=== Group X: Eco-tourism ===
317. Prabhu Raj Dhakal
318. Sunil Maskey
319. Bimala Rai
320. Saru Rai
321. Ram Sitaula
322. Govinda Madhur Acharya
323. Gyanu Rana
324. Bihani Bishowkarma
325. Balram Raj Banshi
326. Bam Bahadur Karki
327. Vijaya Lama
328. Ananda Rai
329. Dhanu Gyangmi Magar
330. Jasoda Limbu
331. Ankit Babu Adhikari
332. Prakash Gurung

=== Group Y: Climate change ===
333. Himal Sagar
334. Yam Baral
335. Narayan Subedi
336. Madan Century
337. Shiva Ale
338. Dr. Ishan Gautam
339. Hemanta Kanchha Rasaily
340. Dr.Bhola Rijal
341. Hari Devi Koirala
342. Sambhujeet Baskota
343. Gurudev Kamat
344. Krishna Bhakta Rai

=== Group Z: The Earth ===
345. Devika Bandana
346. Durga Dahal
347. Prakash Katuwal
348. Shiva Shah
349. Jaya Devkota
350. Devendra Babu B.K.
351. Aashik Prajapati
352. Miraj Thapa
353. Kumar Rana
354. Shuku Ram B.K.
355. Rakesh Soni
356. Nirmala K.C.
357. Bhuwan Prakash Badu
358. Desh Bhakta Kunwar
359. Deepak Kumar Shahi
360. Raju Shah
361. Biru Lama
362. Bibee Limbu
363. Ratna Shrestha
364. Nil Mani Bhandari
365. Kiran Pudasaini
366. Ramesh Century
