= Santosh Sapkota =

Nepali lyricist

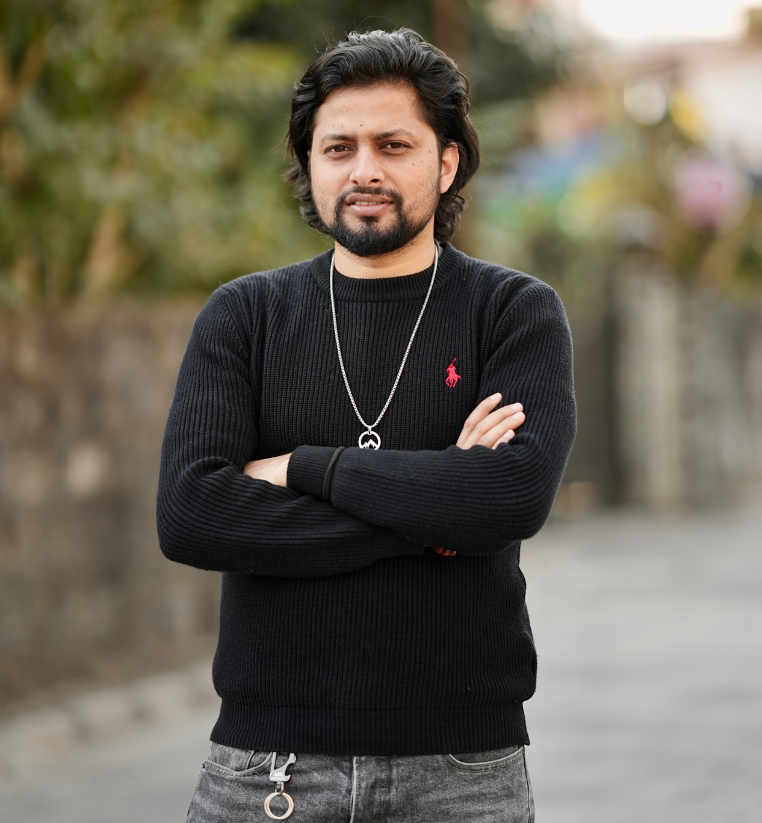
- Born: April 2, 1998 (age 28); Parbat, Nepal
- Occupations: Songwriter, Social media manager
- Years active: 2018–present
- Website: https://santoshsapkota.info.np/

Santosh Sapkota (Nepali: सन्तोष सापकोटा; born April 2, 1998) is a Nepalese lyricist and social media manager who works in Nepalese folk music industry. Sapkota debuted with the song "Baseu Alakkai" which was composed by Arjun Sapkota and sung by Arjun Sapkota and Shanti Shree Pariyar.

== About ==
Sapkota was born to father Dirgha Narayan Sapkota and mother Parbati Sapkota on April 2, 1998, in the Parbat district Nepal. Sapkota moved to Rupandehi district where he completed his S.L.C., then Sapkota completed his diploma in mechanical engineering in Bengaluru.

== Awards ==
Year	Award	Category	Song	Result	Ref.
2026	Bindabasini Music Awards	Best Lyrics of the year	Jhaliko	Nominated	
2026	Galbandi Film and Music Award	Best Folk Dohori Lyrics	Jhaliko	Nominated	
2026	National Lok Dohori Music Award	Best Folk Duet Lyrics	Jhaliko	Nominated	
2025	National Rapti Music Award	Best Folk Duet Lyrics	Baseu Alakkai	Nominated	
2025	Bindabasini Music Awards	Best Song of the year	Dukha Satamla	Nominated	
2025	Bindabasini Music Awards	Best lyrics of the Year	Dukha Satamla	Won	
2025	Musickhabar Music Award	Best Folk Duet Lyrics	Baseu Alakkai	Won	

== Partial discography ==
Year	Song	Role	Singer	Ref
2024	Baseu alakkai	Lyricist	Arjun Sapkota, Shanti Shree Pariyar	
2024	Dukha Sataula	Lyricist	Arjun Sapkota, Devi Gharti Magar, Samikshya Adhikari	
2024	Manai marigo	Lyricist	Shreedhar Adhikari, Kalpana Bista	
2025	Kyari Bhulam mero mana	Lyricist	Arjun Sapkota, Samjhana Adhikari	
2025	Rumal Kiremire	Lyricist	Santoshi Sunar, Arjun Sapkota	
2025	Soltini Ukhummai Man Paryo	Lyricist	Pratap Das, Shanti Shree Pariyar	
2025	Jhaliko	Lyricist	Arjun Sapkota, Melina Rai, Samikshya Adhikari	
