= Arjun Sapkota =

Nepalese singer (born 1999)

- अर्जुन सापकोटा
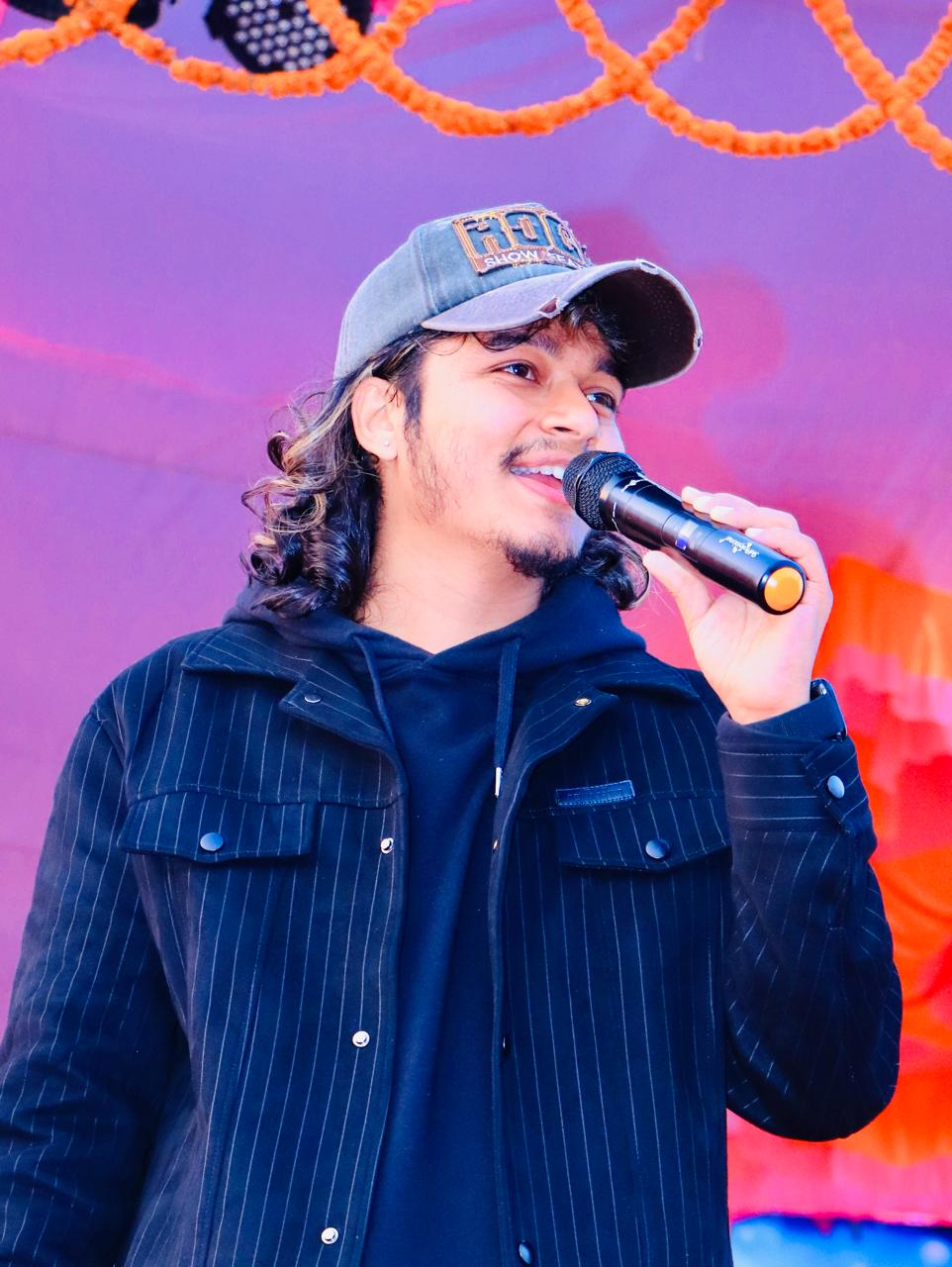
- Born: 26 January 1999 (age 27)
- Occupations: Singer, song writer, musician
- Known for: Singing
- Notable work: Jhaliko, Baseu Alakkai, pachheuri lisyo, Banki Chari banaima ramayo, Dui duna chaar, Fulyo gurasha
- Parents: Mani Sapkota (father); Durga Sapkota (mother)
- Relatives: Aviral Sapkota (brother); Ashika Sapkota (sister); Santosh Sapkota (brother)
- Awards: National Music Awards, Bindabasini Music Awards
- Website: https://arjunsapkota.com.np/

Arjun Sapkota (Nepali: अर्जुन सापकोटा; born 26 January 1999) is a Nepalese singer, composer, lyricist and model, known for his contribution towards Nepali folk music industry. As of March 2023 Sapkota has given voice to more than 30 Songs "Banki chari", "Baseu Alakkai", "Dukha Satamla", "Dui duna chaar", "pachheuri lisyo", "fulyo gurasha", "Nagara pir maya", "A thuli " including others are his few songs. Sapkota came to limelight after his 2019 Lok Dohori song "Banki chari banaima ramayo" with Devi Gharti Magar released on his own YouTube Channel. Sapkota became one of the coaches of The Voice of Nepal Kids Season 5 (2026).

== Early life ==
Sapkota was born on 26 January 1999 to father Mani Sapkota and mother Durga Sapkota in Pelakot-Syangja district of Nepal. At the age of 5 Sapkota moved to Nawalparasi with his family where he started working at Radio Darpan as a radio jockey before jumping into musical field .

== Awards ==
Year	Award	Category	Result	Ref.
2026	National Music Award	Best folk singer male	Won	
2026	Bindabasini Music Award	Best folk singer of the year	Won	
2025	Bindabasini Music Award	Best folk singer of the Year	Won	
2024	Sadhana Music Award	Best folk singer	Won	
2024	Diamond Music Award	Best folk model	Won	
2023	B.Star Films Music Award	Best song	Won	
2023	B.Star Films Music Award	Best folk Singer	Won	
2022	National Box Office Teej Award 2078	Best Folk Singer	Won	
2022	Music Khabar Music Award	Best Folk Song	Nominated	
2022	Sagarmatha Music Award	Best New Singer	Nominated	
2021	Best Music Award	Best Folk Singer	Nominated	
2021	Jyoti Films Music Award 2077	Best Folk Musician	Nominated	
2021	Nepal Best Music Award	Popular Singer	Nominated	

== Discography ==
- Banki chari banaima ramayo - with Devi Gharti Magar
- Bammai Jani Railaima
- Nasodha Pir Ke Ko
- Dukha Satamla
- Baseu Alakkai - with Shanti Shree Pariyar
- Rukh Ko Paata Khasyo Bhui Tira
- Dhalkera nachchhu - with Devi Gharti Magar
- Pachheuri lisyo - with Bimal Adhikari, Samikhshya Adhikari and Rabin Lamichhane
- Dui duna chaar
- Fulyo Guransha- with Raju Pariyar
- A Thuli
- Daju Bhai Teej - With Pashupati Sharma
- Mutu retinchha
- Nagara pir maya
- Tihar asyesi yessai ramailo
- Simalai ma maina
- Pirati nalam maya
- Bhau badhyo
- Man pareki pauda - With Mani Sapkota, Santosh Sapkota
- Batti panasma - With Raju Pariyar
- Jhaliko
