= Raju Pariyar =

Nepalese singer

लोक स्वर सम्राट राजु परियार
- Born: Raju Pariyar; 28 June 1980 (age 45)
- Origin: Lamjung, Nepal
- Genres: Dohori
- Occupation: Singing

Raju Pariyar (Nepali: लोक स्वर सम्राट राजु परियार; born 28 June 1980) is a Nepali folk singer and songwriter, celebrated for his contributions to traditional Nepali folk music. Often referred to as the "Lok Swar Samrat". Pariyar has made a significant impact on the music industry in Nepal. His work has been instrumental in preserving and promoting the traditional music of Nepal, resonating with audiences both within the country and among the Nepali diaspora.

== Early and personal life ==
Pariyar was born on 28 June 1980 in a Gurung village in Chisapani, Lamjung district, Nepal, to Mangal Singh Pariyar and Santa Maya Pariyar. He was deeply influenced by Rodhi, a traditional form of music and social gathering in the Gurung community, which played a significant role in shaping his musical sensibilities.

== Career ==
Pariyar began his musical career by performing in Dohori Saanjh. He used to sing in Pukar Dohori Saanjh and Dobhan Dohori Saanjh, where he gained valuable exposure and met fellow artist Badri Pangeni. These experiences were pivotal in his career, allowing him to showcase his talent and connect with other musicians.

He recorded his first song "Kishimkotma Chari Nacheko" at Reema Recording Studio then owned by another popular Nepali singer Narayan Rayamajhi, with significant assistance from Shanta Nepali, before passing the Sur Parikshya conducted by Radio Nepal. Successfully passing this examination marked a crucial milestone in his career. Following this, he continued to perform and solidify his status as a prominent figure in Nepali folk music.

Throughout his career, Pariyar collaborated with several prominent female singers, including Bishnu Majhi, Bima Kumari Dura and Sharmila Gurung. These collaborations often resulted in hit songs, further enhancing his reputation in the Nepali music scene. In career spanning over two decades he has recorded over 16,000 songs.

His songs often resonate with themes of love, longing, and the struggles of everyday life, showcasing his ability to connect with audiences on a deeply emotional level.

== Discography ==
=== Songs ===
- Aadhi Khola Urlera Aayo
- Phool Ma Mauri Dulne Belama
- Mirmireko Gham
- Dura Dande Dai
- Sunpanile
- Rumal Dhoko Chhu
- Lalupate Nugyo Bhuitira
- Jhim Jhim Sanu Najhimkau Pareli
- Dali Palayo Tara Maya Palaina
- Rudai Rudai Janchhu Melama

=== Awards ===
- Noor-Ganga Talent Award
- Jhalakman Lok Sangeet Samman
