= Shanti Shree Pariyar =

Nepalese singer

Shanti Shree Pariyar शान्तिश्री परियार
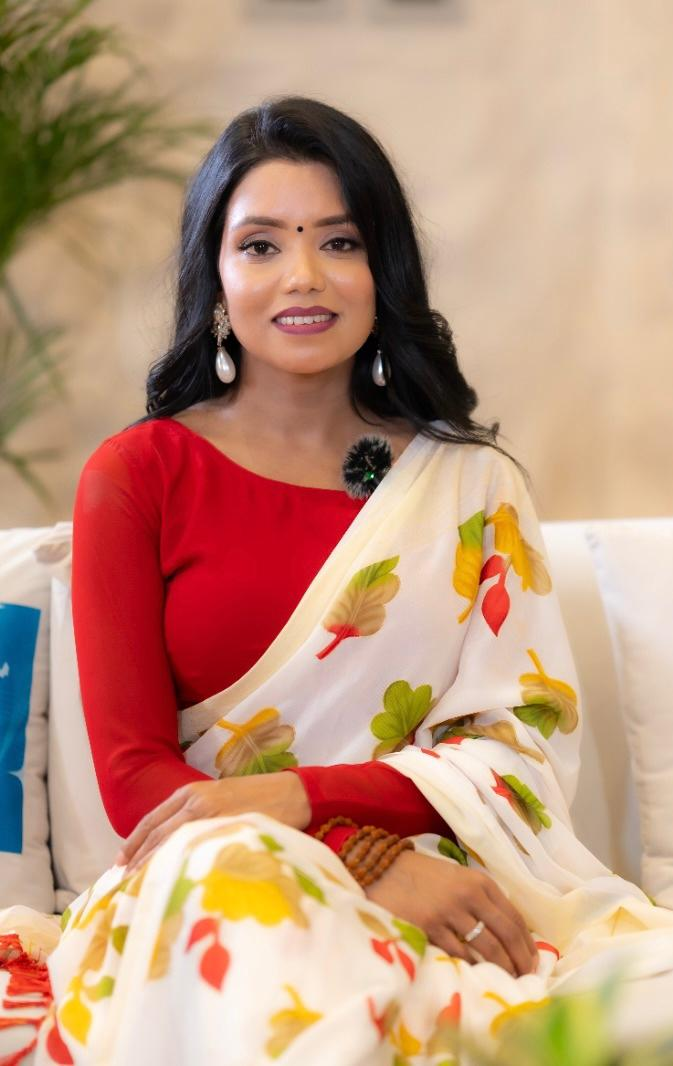

Background information
- Born: August 23, 1989 (age 37)
- Genres: Folk, Modern
- Occupations: Singer, Composer
- Years active: 2011-present
- Website: https://shantishreepariyar.com/

Shanti Shree Pariyar (Nepali: शान्तिश्री परियार; born 23 August 1989) is a Nepalese playback singer and music composer known for her contribution towards Nepali folk and modern music industry. Most of her songs revolve around patriotism, love, and social discrimination. As of 2025 Pariyar has recorded over 3,000 songs including "Rukum Maikot", "Areli Kadaile Malai", "Bola Maya", "Galbandi", "Baseu Alakkai", "Gorkhe Khukuri", "Chauka Dau", "Aago bina bidi jaldaina", "Chhutnalai Po Raichha Kyare", "Ghumi Ghumi" and "Lahur Jane Relaima" among others.

== Early life and career ==
Pariyar was born in Hwama VDC of Rolpa District, Nepal, to father Karme Pariyar and mother Dilshara Pariyar. She was raised in a lower middle-class family in rural Rolpa and completed her Secondary Level education from Bal Kalyan Higher Secondary School, Liwang.

She began her professional music career in Kathmandu. Her first recorded song, Ghar Chha Tin Talle, was released in 2011. However, it was the song Bola Maya, composed by Prakash Saput, that brought her widespread recognition. As of 2025, Pariyar has recorded more than 3,000 songs.

== Awards ==
Year	Award	Category	Song	Result	ref
2025	Radio Kantipur National Music Awards	Best Female Singer - Lok	Timi Ra Ma Jam Maya	Won	
2024	Radio Kantipur National Music Awards	Best Female Lok Singer	Majhi Dai	Won	
2023	Radio Kantipur National Music Awards	Best Female Lok Singer		Nominated	
2023	Genius Music Award	Best Female Folk Singer	Solti Bazarma	Won	
2022	Tuborg Image Awards	Best Vocal Performance	Ghumi Ghumi	Won	
2022	Bindabasini Music Awards	Best Female Folk Singer	Hataika Paujale	Won	
2020	Radio Kantipur National Music Awards	Public Choice Award	Bola Maya	Won	
2019	Tuborg Image Awards	Best Duet Song	Bola Maya	Won	
2019	Radio Kantipur National Music Awards	Best Folk Singer (Female)	Bola Maya	Won	
2019	Kalika FM Music Award	Best Folk Singer (Female)	Galbandi	Won	
2019	Chhinnalata Awards	Emerging Talent Award		Won	

== Partial discography ==
Year	Song	Composer	Lyricist	Other Singer	ref
2024	Rukum Maikot	SD Yogi	Surendra Rana	SD Yogi	
2024	Gorkhe Khukuri	Nischal Dawadi	Nischal Dawadi	Nischal Daawadi	
2024	Baseu Alakkai	Arjun Sapkota	Santosh Sapkota	Arjun Sapkota	
2024	Timi Ra Ma Jam Maya	Govinda Pangeni	Govindia Pangeni	Suman BT	
2024	Hiyarai	Binod Bajurali	Binod Bajurali	Binod Bajurali	
2024	Radha Piyari	Krishna Bk	Krishna Bk	Krishna Bk	
2024	A keta madalu padka	Hari Bansha Acharya	Hari Bansha Acharya	Hari Bansha Acharya	
2023	Areli Kadaile malai	Khem Century	Netra Aryal	Solo	
2023	Majhi Dai	Khem Century	Netra Aryal	Khem Century	
2023	Kauli	Hari Bansha Acharya	Hari Bansha Acharya	Hari Bamsha Acharya	
2023	Kahako Saino	Bimal Pariyar	Shiva Hamal	Bimal Pariyar	
2023	Jam Bho Maili	Prakash Dutraj	Prakash Dutraj	Prakash Dutraj	
2022	Solti Bazarma	Nischal Dawadi	Nischal Dawadi	Nischal Dawadi	
2022	Ghumi Ghumi	Sujan Chapagain	Hark Saud	Sujan Chapagain	
2021	Bandipuraima	Prem Raja Mahat	Prem Raja Mahat	Prem Raja Mahat	
2021	Ghar Kata Ho Bainiko	Prakash Dutraj	Prakash Dutraj	Parkash Dutraj	
2021	Chauka dau	Babu Krishna Pariyar	Bijaya Chand Darpan	Babu Krishna Pariyar	
2020	Tara Baji Lai Lai	Durga Poudel	Durga Poudel	Pashupati Sharma, Aayusha Gautam	
2020	Chhutna Lai Po Raichha	Thaneshwor Gautam	Prava Bartaula	Thaneshwor Gautam	
2019	Galbandi	Prakash Saput	Prakash Saput	Prakash Saput	
2018	Bola Maya	Prakash Saput	Prakash Saput	Narayan Rayamajhi, Prakash Saput	
