= List of world records from Nepal =

This is a list of world records created in Nepal or by Nepali citizen.

| Record on | When | Name | Short description | References |
|---|---|---|---|---|
| Shortest Man in the World | October 14, 2010 | Khagendra Thapa Magar(October 4, 1992 – January 17, 2020) | He had height of 67.08 cm He was 18 years old. | |
| Most viewers for a cardiovascular live stream on Facebook | World Heart Day-2023 | Om Murti Anil | He delivered 30 minute scientific session on Diagnosis of Hypertension which peaked 11,212 concurrent viewers. | |
| Mt Everest, Youngest successful climber | July 23, 2000 | Temba Tsheri Sherpa (born 6 May 1985) | Successfully summited Mt Everest on 23 May 2001, aged 16 years 7 days. | |
| Earliest ascent of Mt Everest without oxygen | May 8, 1978 | Reinhold Messner | Reinhold Messner (Italy) and Peter Habeler (Austria) made the first successful ascent of Mt Everest without supplemental oxygen | |
| Oldest person to climb Mt Everest (female) | July 16, 2001 | Tamae Watanabe (born 21 November 1938) | Tamae Watanabe from Japan reached the summit of Mt Everest at the age of 63 years 177 days. | |
| Oldest person to climb Mt Everest (male) | May 25, 2008 | Min Bahadur Sherchan (20 June 1931-May 6, 2017) | In Senior Citizen Mt Everest Expedition, Min Bahadur Sherchan reached the summit at the age of 76 years 340 days. | |
| Most conquests of Mt. Everest | May 21, 2010 | Apa Sherpa | He reached the summit of Mt Everest for the 20th time on 21 May 2010 | |
| Earliest bowler to take 10 wickets in a limited overs international | May 25, 2008 | Mehboob Alam | He took all 10 wickets in an ICC international cricket in Jersey, UK, on 25 May 2008. The match was contested as part of the 2008 ICC World Cricket League Division V competition | |
| Largest clear-up on Everest | 2010 | Nepali Eco Everest Expeditions | They removed 12,000 kg of garbage. | |
| High altitude Fashion Show | January 2020 | Nepal Tourism Board | Mount Everest Fashion Runway was held at 5340 meters (17515 feet) elevation at Kala Patthar, near Everest base camp. | |
| Longest Dancing Marathon by an Individual | November 2018 | Bandana Nepal | She danced for 126 consecutive hours | |
