= Sunita Dulal =

Nepalese folk singer

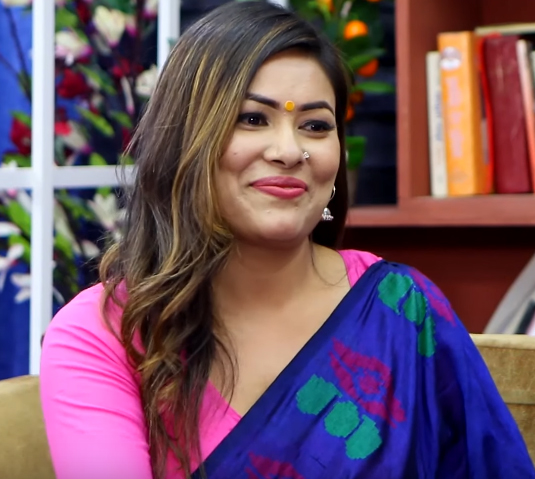
- Sunita Dulal at a comedy show

Background information
- Born: Jalbire, Nepal
- Genres: Playback singer, Nepalese folk singer
- Occupation: Singer
- Years active: 2009–present

Sunita Dulal (Nepali: सुनिता दुलाल) is a prominent Nepalese folk singer from Kathmandu, Nepal (born in Jalbire, Sindhulpalchok District). She has been singing Nepali folk, festive to modern songs for the last ten years. Sunita Dulal is a multitalented young Nepali woman. In addition to singing, Sunita Dulal also does acting, presents program on NTV (Nepal Television, a state television channel), and modeling as well. Recently, she has released her 13th album Mero Hajur on market which reflects to be another super hit Nepalese Teej Festive album of her. Teej festival normally falls from late July to early September. Sunita Dulal has now released her this year's Teej Album Nachau Sarara; which is her 15th album including songs 'Teej Ko Ayo Lahara' and 'Chuppa Moi Khaula'. She also participated in Melancholy, an environmental song by 365 Nepalese artists in which break Guinness World Record entitled "Most Vocal Solos in a Song Recording" is written, music composed and directed by Nipesh DHAKA. On 19 May 2016, Dulal recorded her solo part with her group at Radio Nepal studio and officially released on 2 September 2017 by president Bidya Devi Bhandari at Army Officer's Club, Kathmandu.

== Life and career ==
Sunita Dulal was born in Jalbire, Sindhulpalchok District, of Central Nepal. She completed her schooling from Golden Bright Future Boarding School and Shree Anand Secondary School in Jalbire, Sindhupalchwok. After completion of her higher education, she moved to Kathmandu for further study. She then achieved her bachelor's degree in humanities from Padma Kanya Campus, Kathmandu, Nepal. Sunita Dulal entered into the music industry at a young age. She has recorded more than 100 Nepali Folk songs. She has been brought up in a musically nurtured family. Sunita Dulal says, "I remember how my teachers and seniors would make me sing and dance when I was only in class three," who is a great fan of Aruna Lama"From Lok to Adhunik Geet". She also refers to her mother as one of her major influences on her singing career. Some of Sunita Dulal's best songs include 'आमाले पकाको मिठो खाना', 'अब त मैले नी झुम्का लगाउछु', 'उनको लागी ब्रत बसेको' and 'मेरै दीलमा फुल्यौ निरमाया'. She likes to travel and explore new places. She has traveled across the US, Europe, South Korea, Japan, Malaysia, Hong Kong, and several Middle East countries.

== Personal life ==
Sunita Dulal is currently focused on her career. She hasn't made up her mind about marriage life. She is planning to get married in few years.

== Trainings ==
- 2004 Master of Ceremony Training at Kingdom of Nepal The Reiyukai
- 2005 Advanced Course in Radio Journalism, FM and Radio Program Productions and Master of Ceremony at Nepal Anchor’s Association, Nepal
- 2009 Fundamental Course of Master of Ceremony and Leadership Development (Grade A) at Rotaract Club, Kathmandu, Nepal Vocal Class at Sadhana Kala Kendra, Kathmandu, Nepal

== Awards and recognitions ==
- 2019 Best Female Folk Singer- Radio Kantipur 96.1
- 2018 Rastriya Prativa Puruskar from Government of Nepal
- 2017 Rastriya Nari Samaan Award(Woman for Woman)
- 2016 Chhaya chhabi Teej music award
- 2015 Awarded Rastriya Nari samaj (Nepal youth society )Awarded by Female council New Jersey USA
- 2014 Rampam Bindabasini music award for best lok dhori song Awarded by Nepalese Community Society of Calgary Canada
- 2013 Blue diamond star FM best lok female singer music award Rastriya Nari samaj(Focus Nepal)Awarded by Nepalese Canadian community service Canada
- 2012 ’Singer of The Year 2012’ Nepali Songs TV
- 2011 ‘Best Female Folk Singer’ – Hetauda FM 96.6
- 2011 ‘Certificate of Appreciation’ Embassy of Nepal in USA
- 2011 ‘Top 5 Folk Singers of The Year’ – Kantipur FM
- 2009 Best Female Folk singer of the year award by Hetauda FM 96.6
- 2009 Special Recognition by Paurakhi Group Syangja Samaj, Qatar
