= Devi Gharti Magar =

Nepali folk singer

Devi Gharti Magar देवी घर्ती मगर
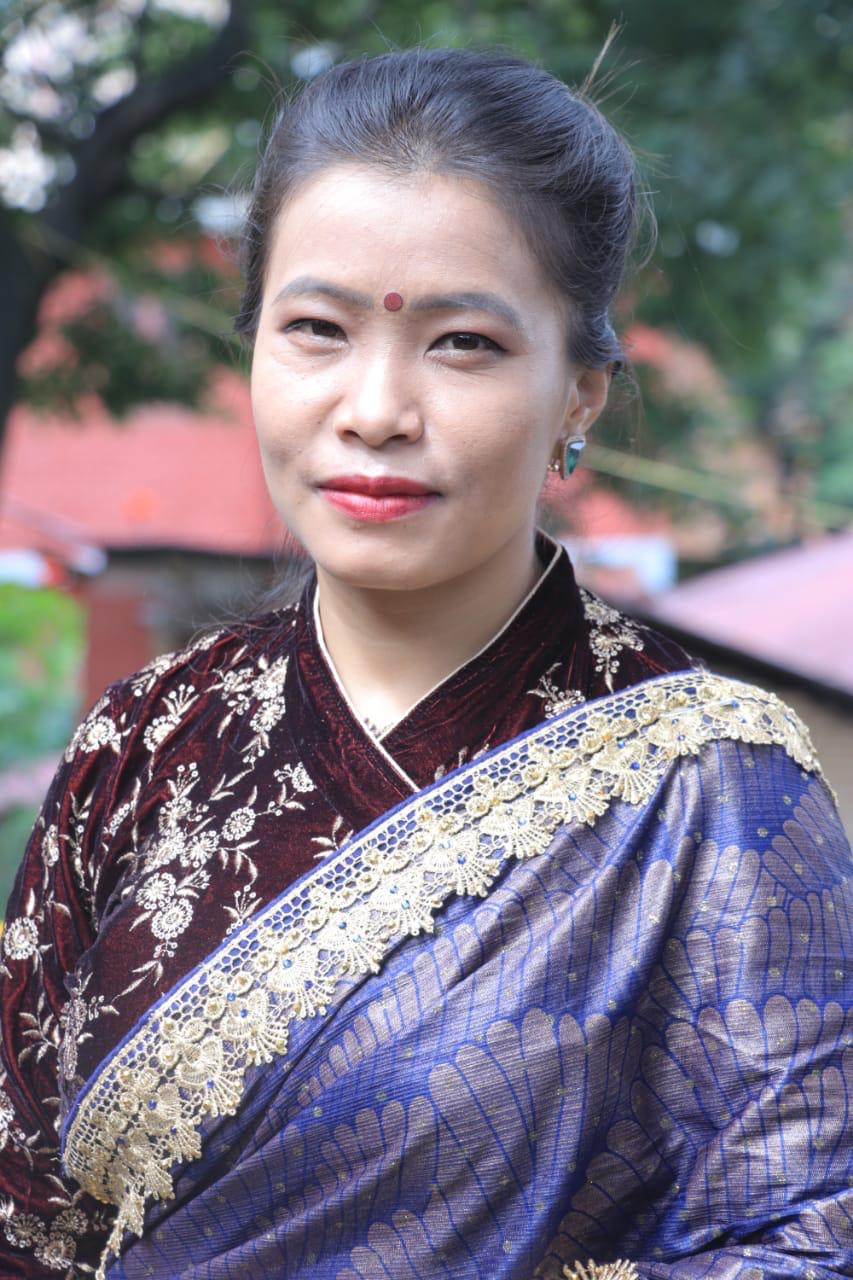

Background information
- Born: 5 January 1986 (age 40); Ramuwa, Baglung, Nepal
- Genres: Folk
- Occupation: Singer
- Instrument: Vocal

Devi Gharti Magar (Nepali: देवी घर्ती मगर) is a Nepali folk singer. She was born in Ramuwa village of Baglung district Nepal. She married Raju Dhakal on 2008. She meet Dhakal on 2004 in Folk Duet program. She was elected as open central member of "Lok Dohori Pratisthan" (Folk Duet Academy) in 2019.

== Awards ==
Year	Award	Category	Result	Ref.
2012	Music Khabar Music Award	Best Singer Folk and Duet	Won	
2015	Teej Music Award	Best Teej Singer	Won	
2016	Bayo Lokdohori Award	Best female folk singer	Won	
2017	Music Khabar Award	Most popular of the year	Won	
2017	Kalika Music Award	Best female folk singer	Won	
2018	Prithivi Rastriya Dohori Award	Best female folk singer	Won	
2019	Sadhana Music Award	Best female folk singer	Nominated	

Her 2017 Panche baja song "Oralima Bar" was written by Sharad pandey and sung by Pandey and Devi Gharti Magar herself. In 2020 she along with Ramji Khand came up with the song "Dui mutuko bandhan". Same year she released the song "takine aaina".

== Discography ==
- Badala Barilai – solo
- Banki Chari -with Arjun Sapkota
- Ma Ta Aaune Thina Yehi Chal hola Vanya Bha – with Shirish Devkota
- Lauri harayo – with Pashupati Sharma
- Rudai Fulyo Makhmali – with Badri Pangeni
- Syangja Hudai Baglung Bazara – with Raju Pariyar
- Fulma Mauri Dulne Belama – with Raju Pariyar
- Jimmal ba ko Aaganima – with Kulendra Bishwokarma
- Uhi kholima paani – with Rajan Gurung
- Hasna sikayeu – with Kulendra Bishwokarma
- Najarai ko Bhara – with Shirish Devkota
- Herna oi Batuli – with Pashupati Sharma
- Jhalko lali oth ko – with Milan Lama
- Gham bhanda ni junko – with Bishnu Khatri
- Yo Dashain - with Asmita Rana
- Ke khanxeu kamala - with Parjapati Parajuli
