= Baseu Alakkai =

2024 Nepali song

Song by Arjun Sapkota and Shanti Shree Pariyar

from the album Baseu Alakkai
- Language: Nepali
- Published: 2024
- Recorded: 2024
- Genre: Folk
- Composer: Arjun Sapkota
- Lyricist: Santosh Sapkota

Baseu Alakkai (Nepali: बस्यौ अलक्कै) is a 2024 Nepali deut folk song composed by Arjun Sapkota and written by Santosh Sapkota. Sung by Arjun Sapkota and Shanti Shree Pariyar, featuring Arjun Sapkota and Garima Sharma. Released in May 2024 on YouTube video shows complicated love story. Sapkota won Best Folk Singer Award at Bindabasini music award in 2025 from this song.

== Track listing ==
No.	Title	Lyrics	Music	Singer(s)	Length
1.	"Baseu Alakkai"	Santosh Sapkota	Arjun Sapkota	Arjun Sapkota , Shanti Shree Pariyar	9:56
Total length:					9:56

== Awards ==
Year	Ceremony	Award	Result	Ref.
2025	Bindabasini Music Awards	Best Folk Singer	Won	
2025	Musickhabar Music Award	Best Folk Duet Lyrics	Won	
2025	Musickhabar Music Award	Best Folk Video Director	Nominated	
2025	Bindabasini Music Award	Best Folk Music	Nominated	
2025	Rapati Music Award	Best Folk Lyrics	Nominated	
2025	Rapati Music Award	Best Folk Singer	Nominated	
2025	Rapati Music Award	Best Folk Music	Nominated	
2025	Musickhabar Music Award	Best Folk Singer	Nominated	

== Credits and personnel ==
Original version

- Arjun Sapkota, Shanti Shree Pariyar - Singers
- Santosh Sapkota- Lyrics
- Arjun Sapkota - Music
- Milan Bishwokarma - Editor
- Buddha Thapa - Cameramen
- Bishal Ghimire - Director
