= Babita Shrestha =

Nepalese music director (born 1980)

- बविता श्रेष्ठ
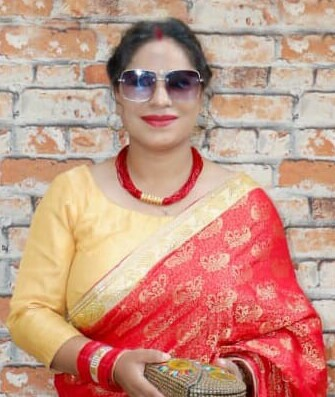
- Born: 25 June 1980 (age 45); Lalitpur, Nepal
- Occupation: Director
- Years active: 2011–present

Babita Shrestha is a Nepalese music video director, known for her work in the Nepalese folk music industry. She has been directing music videos since 2011 (2068 BS). The song Ek Hazar Ko Note is one of her best known works. She has directed multiple Lokdohori (Nepalese folk genre) music videos and has won multiple awards for her contribution in the field.

== Career & Biography ==
She has directed numerous Nepali Lok Dohori songs, since 2011. She is also the president of Priyasi Music Pvt. Ltd. and a treasurer of Music Video Directors Guild of Nepal. She has directed more than five hundred music videos. In 2018 (2075 BS), she was nominated for ten awards and won received six awards for directing music videos. She is the President of Music Video Director's Guild of Nepal.

== Awards ==
Year	Awards Name	Result
2022 (2079 BS)	Dirgha Sadhana Samman	Won
2021	Bindabasini Music Award	Won
2019	Sangitkarmi Sangh Music Award	Won
2019	Bostar Music Awards	Won
2017	4th sundardebimusic award	won
2018	1st Natyastwor Music award	won
2017	Rastrya Sangitkarmi sang Music Award	won
2019	2nd Rastrya power News Music Awards	won
2022	Quality films music award	won
2023	jyoty films music award	won

== Notable works ==
Title of the Song	Genre	Role	Release date
Timi Jaha Jaha		Music Video Director	
Mutu Chiri Aadha Aadha		Music Video Director	
Eka Hajar Ko Note Le		Music Video Director	
Singha Durbar		Music Video Director	
Maya Chokho Chha		Music Video Director	
Singha Darbar Jhylai Ma Yena	Pop	Music Video Director	2079 BS (c. 2022//2023)
Ukali Worali	Folk Song		2018/02/23
Aatma Hatya	Folk Song		2018/03/25
Timile Uslai Rojeu	Modern Song		2018/01/20
Janma Mirtu	Folk Song		2018/07/10
Rune Palo	Folk Song		2019/04/28
Oe Sani	Modern Song		2019/07/29
Aashu Jhryo	Modern Song		2019/05/12
Jhuto Maya	Folk Song		2022/02/21
Janmya Thali	Deuda Song		2021/03/5
