= Hemant Sharma =

Nepalese singer

- हेमन्त शर्मा
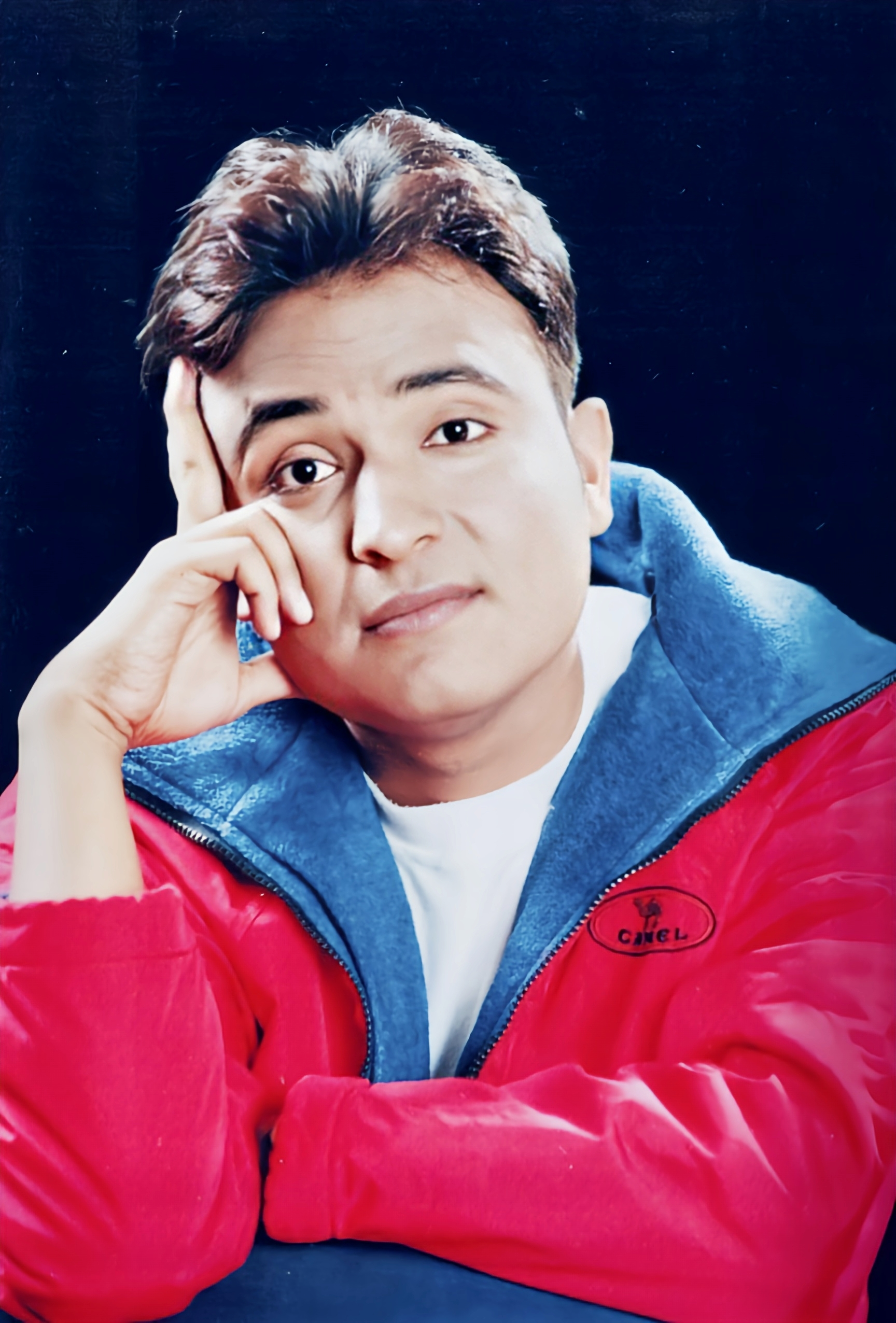
- Born: Triveni, Nawalparasi (now Nawalparasi East)
- Education: Bachelors in Commerce
- Alma mater: Tribhuvan University
- Occupations: Singer, Song Writer, Musician
- Years active: 2000-present
- Known for: Singing
- Notable work: Mula Hau Bhane Rasaideu, Jale Rumala, Maya ta Yesto Hos, Aaudai Gara Malati, Maya Sarai Mahango, Nirjale (Pareli Jhim Jhim Bho), Timi Bahek Mero
- Style: Folk, Nepali Modern, Pop
- Spouse: Ritu Sharma
- Children: 2
- Parents: Danda Pani Sharma (father); Sumitra Sharma (mother)
- Awards: Kalika Music Award (2018)
- Honours: Jana Sewa Shree Medal (2022)
- Website: http://hemantasharma.com/

Hemant Sharma is a modern, pop and folk singer Song Writer and Musician from Nepal. His first album was Oh Priya, released in 2000. However, it was his song "Maya Sarai Mahango" from a 2002 album that brought him into the limelight. Sharma has recorded more than 100 songs and released more than seven solo albums. Sharma was also president of the Performers Society Of Nepal from 2015 to 2017.

== Early life ==
Sharma was born to parents Danda Pani Sharma and Sumitra Sharma in Nawalparasi. He moved to Kathmandu for his studies, and started to sing from college level of education. Sharma has released more than 100 songs, including "Maya sarai Mahango", "Aaudai gara malati" and "Mul hau bhane rasaideu".

== Awards ==
Year	Award	Category	Result	Ref.
2018	Kalika Music Award	Best Male Singer	Won	
2018	Image Awards	Best Male Singer	Nominated	
2018	Surya International Awards	Best Male Singer	Nominated	
2019	Surya International Awards	Best Male Singer	Nominated	
2019	Genius Music Awards	Best Male Singer	Nominated	

== Discography ==
=== Albums ===
Hemant Sharma's Albums
Year	Album	Songs	Label
	O Priye	O Priye	
	Bisesh	Maya Sarai Mahango Yei Maya Lai Amrit Hasnai Parchha Bhanne	
	Lokapriya	Maya Ta Yesto Hos	
	Aatmiya	Mula Hau Bhane Rasaideu Aaudai Gara Malati Thapa Na Thapa (Jale Rumala)	
	Itihas		
	Mandir		
	Parampara		
	Parampara 2		

=== Singles ===
Singles by Hemant Sharma
Year	Song title	Co-Artist	Lyrics	Music
	Chhoyo Maya Le			
	Gudeko Rail Pani			
	Dam Dam Dam Bajyo			
	Barikha			
	Asafal Mayalu			
	Ganga JI			
	Hare Aaja			
	Dil Maa Photo Chha			
	Ban Maryo Banmara Le	Bishnu Majhi		
	Hello Sister Hello Mister	Samikshya Adhikari		

- Mul hau bhane
- Aaudai gara malati
- Timi bahek mero koi chhaina
- Ban maryo banmarale - with Bishnu Majhi
- Thapana thapa hataima
- Lajai lajai
- Maya sarhai mahango
- Maya yesto hos
- Hello sister hello mister
- Ke maya garnu hunna ra
- Barikha
- Ukali jada jadai
- Nacha Nacha
- Hunna hunna
- Timi arkai gharko manxe
- Chhoyo mayale
