= Naya Belhani =

Naya Belhani नयाँ बेल्हानि
- Village development committee
- Location in Nepal Naya Belhani (Nepal)
- Coordinates: 27.61°N 83.95°E
- Country: Nepal
- Province: Gandaki Province
- District: Nawalpur District

Population (1991)
  - Total: 9,786
- Time zone: UTC+5:45 (Nepal Time)

Naya Belhani is a village development committee in Nawalparasi District in the Lumbini Zone of western Nepal. At the time of the 1991 Nepal census it had a population of 9786 people living in 1795 individual households. Naya Belhani is divided into 9 wards, among which ward number 9, Arunkhola is the center of the VDC, which is considered one of an emerging business market of the Nawalparasi district. The VDC's main interesting factor is divided into two parts by Aarungkhola river and East West highway. The river is partition 6, 7 & 9 ward east region and 1,2,3,4,5,8 west region.

Naya Belhani VDC main office, Arunkhola

== Schools ==
- Shree Janjyoti Pra. Vi.
- Shree Yadav Secondary School, Tamaspur
- Shree Janata Higher Secondary School (public)
- Shree Janata Secondary School (public)
- Shree Aarungkhola Higher Secondary Boarding School (private)
- Shree Narayani Boarding School (private)
- Shree Shantideep Boarding School( private)
- Little Step Academy (private)
- Shree Majuwa English Boarding School (Private)

=== Campus ===
- Aarungkhola Multiple Campus (Public)
