= Sachin Singh =

- Born: 28 October 1967 (age 57); Kalimpong, Darjeeling, India
- Genres: Pop, classical, modern
- Occupation(s): Singer, composer

Sachin Singh is an Indian Nepali language musician based in Kathmandu, Nepal. He has composed and arranged music for more than 45 Nepali films. He has also composed music for numerous music albums of various Nepali singers. He also participated as a singer on Melancholy, a song by 365 Nepali Singers which is written, music composed and directed by Environmentalist Nipesh DHAKA, is set Guinness World Records in entitled "Most Vocal Solos in a Song Recording".

== Early life ==
Sachin Singh was born in Kalimpong, Darjeeling district, India. He learnt music under Raju Gurung when he was in school in Class VI. He then taught himself to play musical instruments under the guidance of senior musicians and arrangers. Phire Pheri Godhule was the first tune he composed when he was in junior high school. In 1981, this song won him the first prize during Bhanu Jayanti celebration where he had sung the song. He started participating in music competitions, appearing on school as well as college stages and organising musical events. He was inspired by the music of R.D. Burman and Deep Shrestha.

== Music ==
In Kathmandu, Sachin started working in Symphonic Studio as a guitarist, taught music in schools and played guitar in a restaurant. He slowly graduated to arranging songs for films and albums. He tuned Hijo Aaja for Sukmit Gurung's album Hijo Aaja in 1991. He then arranged music for the Nepali film Sweekar of Subodh Shridhar. After a gap of two years he again worked in the film Dharma where he went unnoticed. He gained attention with the song Mero Maya Lai Bari Lai in Ragat (1997). His fame came with the film Sagun (1998) where he composed popular songs like Aago Lagyo Dilaima Damkal Bolaideu. This was a turning point in the Sachin's musical career. Lathi Charge Nagara, Kahabata Ayau Aja, Kasko Aankha Lagyo (Prahineer), Sano Cha Gaun (Sano Sansar) and Ke Kura (Ajhai Pani) are some of this well-known compositions.
