= Pir (song) =

Nepali song

Song by Prakash Saput and Samjhana Bhandari
- Language: Nepali
- Released: March 12, 2022
- Genre: Folk
- Length: 16:25
- Songwriter: Prakash Saput

Pir (Nepali: पिर) is a Nepali song composed by Prakash Saput. Sung by Prakash Saput and Samjhana Bhandari, featuring Saput and Surakshya Panta in the music video. Released on March 12, 2022, it tells the story of former Maoist guerrillas disappointed by the unmet promises of the revolution.

== Background and composition ==
Pir was composed by Prakash Saput. Saput himself sang and acted the male role, while Samjhana Bhandari sang the female role. The song contains a distinct folk rhythm.

== Plot ==
More than a decade after the end of the war, two former guerillas are raising their daughter in a large city. The protagonist, a struggling butcher who keeps a shelf full of Marxist-Leninist literature in the family's one-room slum dwelling, resists his wife's pleas to become a guest worker abroad. Hoping to provide her daughter with a better life, the latter decides to go abroad herself, leaving her husband to raise their child. Three months later, the protagonist has not heard from his wife, and a friend pressures him to see a prostitute to ease his worries. Upon arriving at the prostitute's home, he recognizes her as a former comrade who took part in his wedding, and immediately leaves in shock. Shortly afterwards, he discovers that his wife has been taken hostage abroad, and visits the office of his former commander, now a wealthy senior bureaucrat, to plead for help securing her release; the commander dismisses him without a second thought. As the video closes, the protagonist explains to his daughter that her mother may never return; he bitterly reflects that even though he gave his life and health for the country, it has given him nothing in return and serves only the rich and powerful.

== Controversy ==
The video was met with fierce controversy upon release, mainly due to its portrayal of an ex-Maoist as a sex worker. Many Maoist cadres condemned this aspect of the work, and alleged that the video was released in order to harm the party's chances in the upcoming local election. CPN(MC) chairman Prachanda, however, distanced himself from the backlash, opining that it is only natural for people to view the war and its legacy in different ways. Even so, Saput took the original video down from YouTube and uploaded a censored version without the prostitution sequence.
