= Bola Maya =

Nepali song by Prakash Saput

Single by Prakash Saput ft. Narayan Rayamajhi, Shanti Shree Pariyar
- Released: May 17, 2018
- Studio: Marmik Recording Studio
- Songwriter: Prakash Saput
- Composer: Prakash Saput

"Bola Maya" (Nepali: बोल माया; English: "Speak, My Love") is a song by Nepali singer Prakash Saput, featuring Narayan Rayamajhi and Shanti Shree Pariyar. The song and the accompanying music video express the pain of those who lose their loved ones in foreign lands for employment. Released on 17 May 2018, the song won the Best Folk Song Collection at the 2018 Tuborg Image Awards. In the music video, a young man's body is returned after he dies and the coffin is given to his pregnant wife.

== Background ==
The song was composed and written by Prakash Saput, and sung by Saput featuring Narayan Rayamajhi and Shanti Shree Pariyar. Saput said that he "shares his own painful life in the song". His father had spent about five decades working aboard. Saput also remembers that he carried the coffins of his friends and villagers from Kathmandu to Baglung.

== Music video ==
The music video for "Bola Maya" was filmed entirely in Baglung, Nepal. It starts with a van carrying a wooden coffin which contains the body of a young man (Prakash Saput) who went to work aboard. The coffin is then given to his pregnant wife (Anjali Adhikari), who starts to hug the box, mourning and speaking of the promises he had made prior to going abroad. The song and visual images express the pain of those who lose their loved ones in foreign lands. In the video, Saput wears his father's clothes that he brought as memories from Malaysia.

Within 10 days of release, the music video had received about two million views on YouTube. The video was number one in the trending section of YouTube in Nepal, Qatar, and United Arab Emirates. Actress Anjali Adhikari said that had she not played the role in the music video, it "would have been one of her biggest regrets in life".

== Release and reception ==
"Bola Maya" was released on 17 May 2018 on YouTube. Subhash Ghimire of Republica praised the song, writing that it "move[s] so many of us is because it provides the country with a clever escape—from reality for a split second—and a blessed interval from a breathtaking lack of empathy and care from those sitting in high offices in Singha Durbar who do not stop telling us how they will make Nepal the next 'Singapore, Switzerland', and more".

In 2019, "Galbandi", a sequel to the song, was released.

== Awards and nominations ==
Year	Award	Category	Result	Ref(s)
2018	Tuborg Image Awards	Best Folk Song Collection	Won	
