= Arunkhola =

Coordinates: 27°37′N 83°57′E

Arunkhola आरूङ्गखोला
- Town
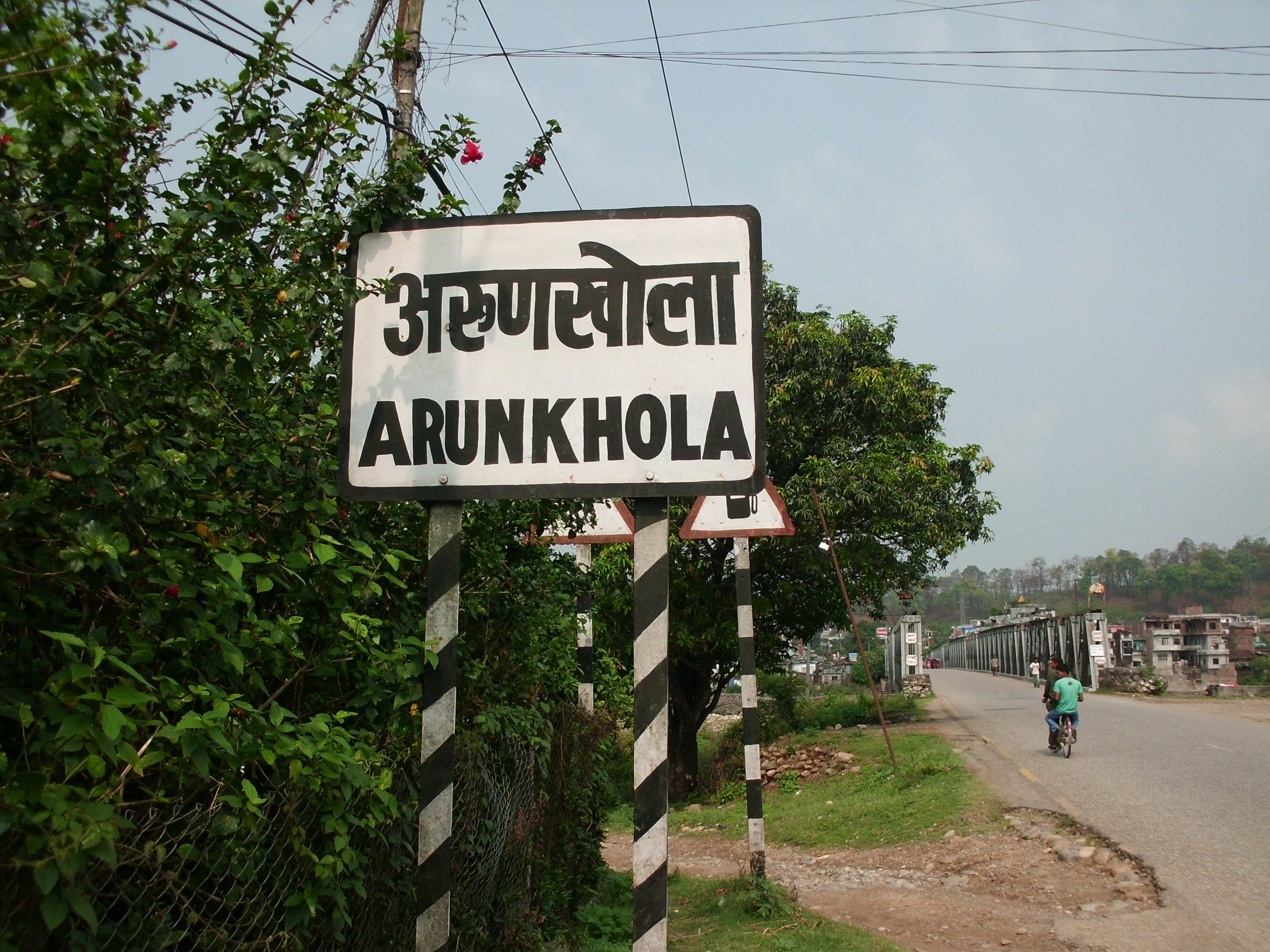
- Arunkhola
- Nicknames: Aarungkhola, Aarunkhola, Bhagra
- Interactive map of Arunkhola
- Country: Nepal
- Time zone: UTC+5:45
- A.P.O. (Postal code): 33006
- Area code: 078

Arunkhola (Nepali: अरुणखोला) is a town situated on the bank of the river Arun (formerly Arung, named after its source in Palpa) before as Naya Belhani VDC Ward No. 8 of Nawalparasi, but now as Madhyabindu Municipality, ward no. 10, Nawalpur District of Western Nepal. It is also known as Aarungkhola (Nepali: आरुङ्गखोला), Aarunkhola(Nepali: आरुणखोला) and Bhagra (Nepali: भाग्रा) (old-fashioned name). It is an emerging business hub of the district.

The east-to-west Mahendra Highway passes through the Arunkhola bazaar, and is 197 km southwest of the capital city Kathmandu. Even though it covers about 100 km^{2} of the Naya Belhani VDC, it is densely populated.

== Commerce ==
Arunkhola lies between Butwal (63 km) and Narayan Ghat (52 km), two major cities of Nepal. It is a major market for Eastern Palpa. Arunkhola is not that far from India either, a 3 hours walk to Triveni, a border town. It has a potential of becoming a major business hub in the area.

While a large number of people in Arunkhola rely on business, its economy is still mainly based on agriculture, service and trade. There are big markets all around Arunkhola. There is also a big community of ex-servicemen of the British and Indian Army, an ex-service men colony in the south of Arunkhola. Arunkhola is about 3 km north of Narayani river and Charkoshe Jhhadi - the largest forest of Nepal and the home of wild animals such as Rhinos, Tigers, etc. There are five 'A' level banks and some small co-operatives in operation. The villages around Arunkhola are Bhiuran, Kusunde, Tamaspur, Belhani, Khayarsal, Karamghari and Charikun. Arunkhola being a relatively new town, it is possible to see people from almost all parts of Nepal in Arunkhola.

== Population ==
According to the 2011 Census, 4,265 people live in 1,028 households. This includes 1,926 males and 2,339 females.

== Schools ==
- Shree Janata Higher Secondary School (public)
- Shree Janata Secondary School (public)
- Shree Aarungkhola Secondary Boarding School (private)
- Shree Narayani Boarding School (private)
- Shree Shantideep Boarding School( private)
- Little Step Academy (private)
- Nepal Open University

HEALTH

- Manu Hospital
- Mini Princeton Hospital
- Nepal Public Hospital
- City Hospital
- Arunkhola Medical College
- WHO INTL. Medical College
- Bishow Pharmecy

== Gallery ==
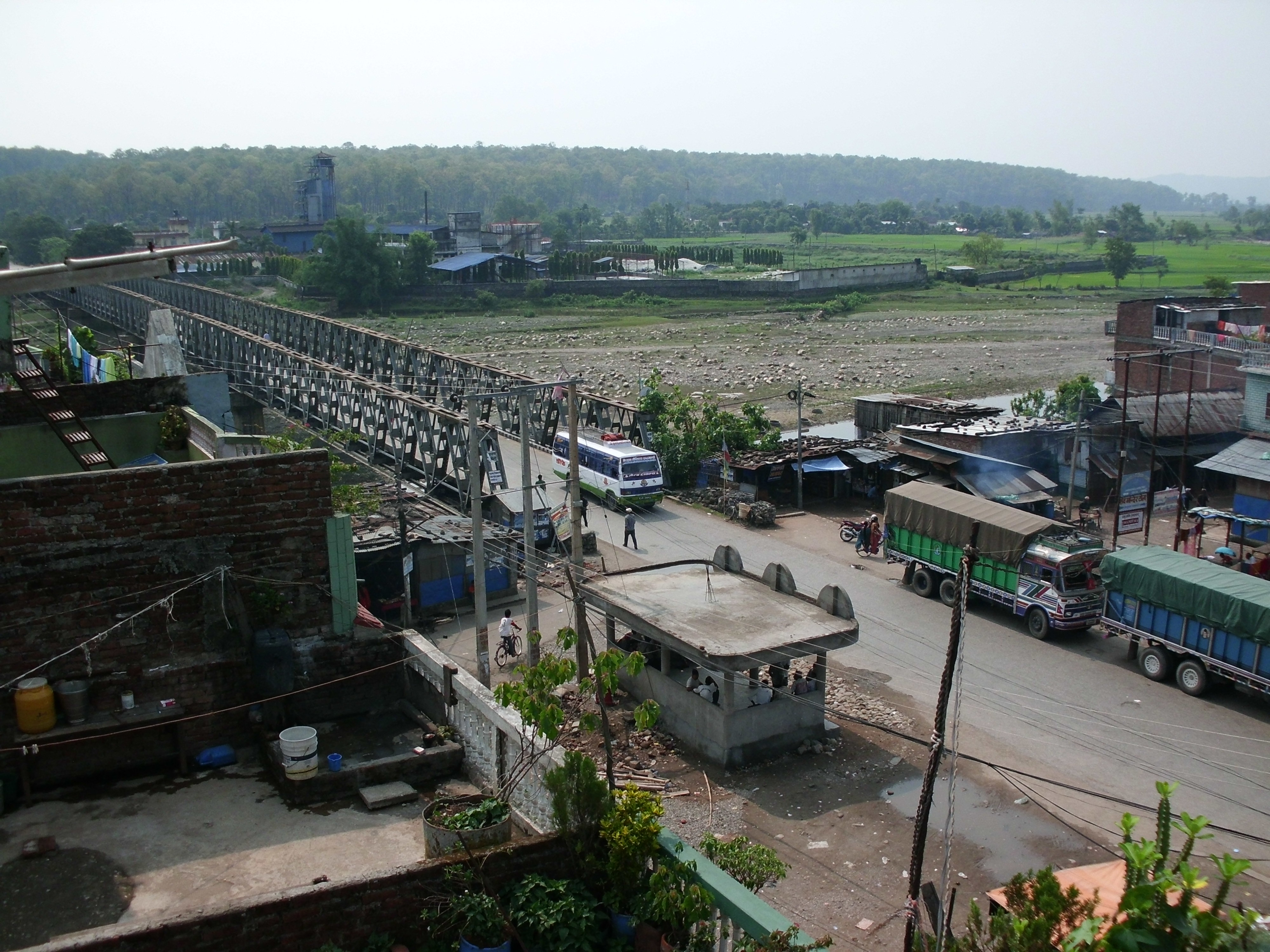
Arunkhola view from the top of the Indira Hotel (east side view)

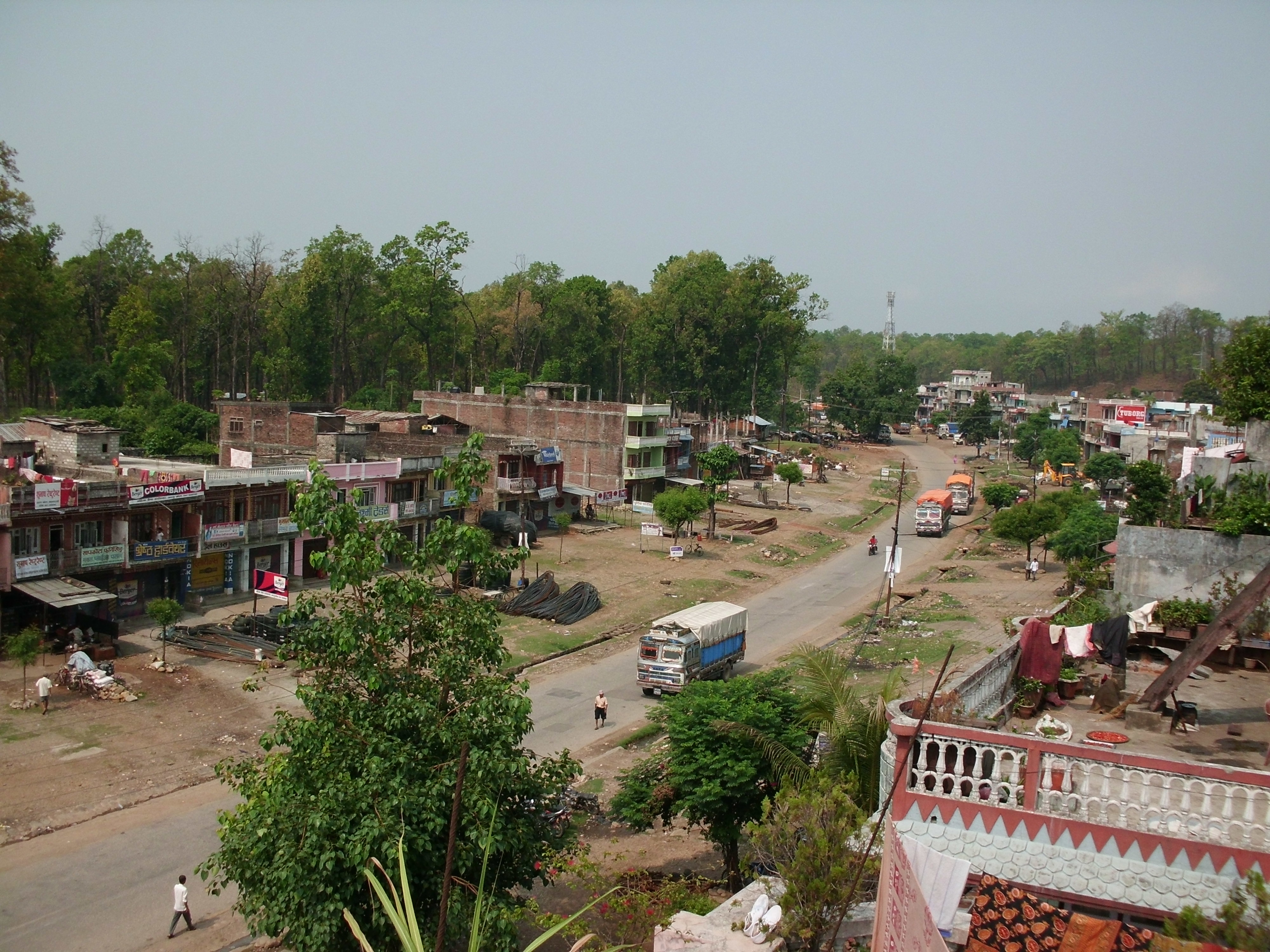
Arunkhola view from the top of Indira Hotel (west side view)
