= Lutna Sake Lut =

2019 satire song by Nepalese folk singer Pashupati Sharma

Single by Pashupati Sharma
- Released: 2019
- Recorded: 2019
- Genre: Satire
- Length: 10:00
- Label: Malashree Recording
- Songwriter: Pashupati Sharma
- Producer: Pashupati Sharma

Lutna Sake Lut (Nepali: लुट्न सके लुट), also known by the song's full name Lutna Sake Lut, Nepal Mai Ho Chhut (लुट्न सके लुट, नेपालमै हो छुट) which translate to "Loot as much as you can, you are free to do so in Nepal" is a 2019 satirical song written and produced by Nepalese folk singer Pashupati Sharma. The music video was released in February 2019, though he later took it down after allegedly receiving threats from Communist Party of Nepal (Unified Marxist–Leninist) youth wing. National Folk and Duet Song Academy Nepal (Rastriya Lok Tatha Dohori Geet Pratisthan Nepal), however, asked the artist to re-upload the song.

== Content ==
Lutna Sake Lut, Nepal Mai Ho Chhut, the full title of the song translates to "loot whatever you can, since that's allowed only in Nepal". Cadres of the ruling party took offense to the line Janatako mutubhitra kanda kati kati! Dedh arbako helicopter chadhchhin Rastrapati (which roughly translates to "The people have got so many thorns in their hearts, the President flies on a helicopter worth 1.5 Arba rupees [1 Arba is 100 crores or 1,000,000,000]") which they considered to be a direct insult to the sitting president. There are many such strongly-worded critiques on the politicians of the country throughout the song.

== Music video ==
The music video features Pashupati Sharma, Manju B.K. and Paryojal Bhandari.

== Reception ==
After release the song received positive feedback from Nepalese audience. After it was taken down fans demanded it be re-uploaded.

== Credits and personnel ==
Original version

- Pashupati Sharma - Singer, writer and producer
- Nabin Dharti Magar - Producer
- Durga Poudel - Director and editor
