= Bandana Nepal =

Nepali dancer

Bandana Nepal is a Nepali dancer. She formerly held the Guinness World Record for "Longest dance marathon by an individual", for which she danced for 126 hours continuously in November 2018. Bandana started to dance at the age of 5. The record was broken by the Indian 16-years-old girl Shrusti Sudhir Jagtap in June 2023.

== Career ==
In 2018, Nepal danced for 126 hours (5.25 days) continuously from Friday, 23 November until Wednesday, 28 November. She danced in Big Foodland restaurant with Nepali music in the background and with "[her] family members, media and [the] general public" watching. The record was previously set by Indian woman Kalamandalam Hemalatha, who performed for 123 hours and 15 minutes. Nepal said Hemalatha inspired her. Nepal's record was broken by Srushti Sudhir Jagtap in June 2023.

In May 2019, Nepal was honoured by the Nepali prime minister KP Sharma Oli and received the official certificate for the Guinness World Record for "Longest dance marathon by an individual". Nepal said that she accepted the challenge to promote the culture of Nepal. For preparation, she performed for about 100 hours. Xinhua News Agency reported that "Despite of continuously shaking her hips and wiggling her neck for 6 days without sleep, rest and proper food, the young girl managed to dance till the targeted hour by maintaining [a] smile on her face".

Nepal established the Bandana Nepal Foundation organisation that "uplifts poor women in Nepal". She has also performed in Bangalore, India. In 2020, she appeared in Shirish Devkota's music video for the song "Chautari".

== Personal life ==
Nepal was born in 2001 and resides in Dhankuta District, Nepal. She is studying Business Management. She started to dance at the age of 5 with her brother and was instructed in Nepal and India.

== See also ==
- List of world records from Nepal
