= Ratyauli =

Traditional event in Nepalese marriage

Ratyauli (Nepali: रत्यौली) is a traditional Nepalese event performed on the wedding day/evening by female relatives and guests in groom's house (during the period between the groom's departure for the bride's home and return). Males are strictly barred from the event, because they perform some erotic dances and songs wearing men's clothes and mimicking their characters. In the event, women play games, sing traditional songs and dance which has some explicit content. In modern times, Ratyauli events are organized in public places as well.

== Proceedings ==
The traditional Ratyauli is organized in three parts based on the sequence of marriage. In the first part, songs are sung describing the events before the groom comes to the bride's home to take her to his house. In the middle part, songs describe the event from wedding to the time when the groom takes the bride to his home. It also describes the relationship between in-laws and the new bride. In this section, the explicit part is sung. In the end part, songs describe the best wishes to the new couple by praying to gods and goddesses.

== See also ==
- Dohori, traditional music of Nepal
