= Rodhi =

Nepalese cultural practice

Rodhi is a traditional cultural practice among the Gurung people of Nepal, characterized by communal gatherings for singing, dancing, and social interaction. These gatherings typically occur in a designated space known as Rodhi Ghar after a day's work, fostering community bonds and cultural expression.

== Cultural significance ==
Rodhi serves as an important social event where community members engage in playful banter and showcase their musical talents. This tradition not only preserves the Gurung heritage but also strengthens social ties among participants.
