= Darlamdanda =

Darlamdanda दर्लामडाँडा
- Village development committee
- Location in Nepal
- Coordinates: 27.91°N 83.61°E
- Country: Nepal
- Zone: Lumbini Zone
- District: Palpa District

Population (1991)
  - Total: 2,389
- Time zone: UTC+5:45 (Nepal Time)

Darlamdanda is a village development committee in Palpa District in the Lumbini Zone of southern Nepal. At the time of the 1991 Nepal census it had a population of 2389 people living in 469 individual households.
