= Rajan Gurung =

Nepali footballer

Personal information
- Date of birth: 15 April 2000 (age 26)
- Place of birth: Waling, Syangja, Nepal
- Height: 1.80 m (5 ft 11 in)
- Positions: Midfielder; defender

Team information
- Current team: Kathmandu Rayzrs
- Number: 16

Senior career*
Years	Team	Apps	(Gls)
2020–2021	Nepal APF	25	(1)
2021–	Kathmandu Rayzrs	7	

International career^{‡}
2021–	Nepal	1	(0)
- * Club domestic league appearances and goals as of 13:58, 15 September 2021 (UTC) ‡ National team caps and goals as of 13:58, 15 September 2021 (UTC)

Rajan Gurung (born 15 April 2000) is a Nepali footballer who plays as a midfielder for Nepali club Kathmandu Rayzrs and the Nepal national team.

He began playing football at his early age as striker or forward in 'Trinity Club' Academy, a local club in waling, syangja and also represent in Inter-School National Tournament.

== Style of play ==
He is primarily deployed as a defensive midfielder but is also capable of playing in any position across the defensive line. He is known for his physicality, aggressive style of play, and high work rate.
