= Bishnu Majhi =

Nepalese folk singer

Bishnu Majhi विष्णु माझी
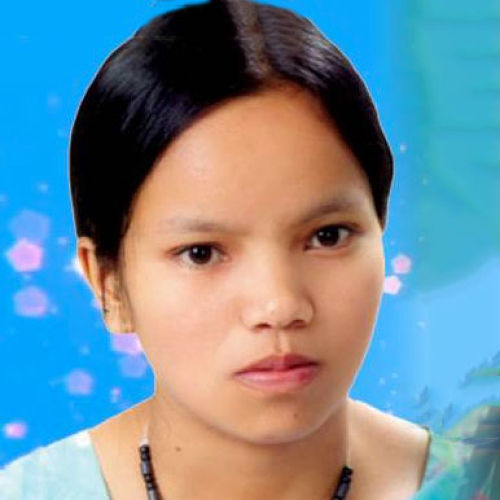
- Bishnu Majhi, in her only publicly released photograph

Background information
- Born: 26 June 1986 (age 40); Khoriya Ghat, Chapakot, Syangja, Nepal
- Genres: Folk
- Occupation: Singer
- Instrument: Vocals
- Years active: 2003–present

Bishnu Majhi (Nepali: विष्णु माझी; born 1986) is a Nepalese folk singer. The highest paid singer in Nepal, she has recorded over 5,000 songs in a career spanning 15 years, including "Sital Dine Pipal Sami Chha", "Driver Dai Man Paryo Malai", "Lalupate Nughyo Bhuintira", "Purbako Mechi Ni Hamrai Ho, Paschim Mahakali Ni Hamrai Ho" and "Rumal Hallai Hallai", among others. Her 2018 song "Salko Patko Tapari Huni" became the most viewed Nepali folk song on Youtube, with more than 90 million views, as of early 2020. Her awards include Hits FM Music Awards and Kalika FM Awards.

Born to a poor family in rural Syangja, she was educated up to the fifth grade, and started singing at public events aged 13. She quickly rose to fame after she began her professional career in Kathmandu around the year 2004, with help from Sundarmani Adhikari, whom she would later marry. She has led a private life throughout her career, with her husband managing all her contracts, schedule and communications, leading to speculations and public concern regarding her wellbeing and safety.

== Early life ==
Majhi was born to father, Tara Bahadur Majhi, and mother, Dharma Kumari, on 26 June 1986 (12 Ashad 2043 BS) in Ratnapur VDC of Syangja District in Nepal. She has two siblings—an elder brother and a younger sister. Born to a poor family, she was educated up to the fifth grade.

== Career ==
Majhi is estimated to have sung over 5,000 songs, popular among them—"Kaslai Sodhne Hola", "Sital Dine Pipal Sami Cha", "Driver Dai Man Paryo Malai", "Lalupate Nughyo Bhuintira", "Mai Chori Salala", "Na Jau Hai Sanu Pandherima", "Tyo Man Runna Hola Ra?", "Purbako Mechi Ni Hamrai Ho, Pascim Mahakali Ni Hamrai Ho", "Ghamle Ni Poldiyo, Junle Ni Jado Bho", "Hare Siva Ram", "Rumal Hallai Hallai" ,"Bhetai Hunna Hola Ra", "Chari Jelaima","Salko Patko Tapari Huni", "Lalumai".

=== Beginnings ===
Majhi started singing in public events at age 13, with the support of singer Narayan Lekali, a resident of a neighbouring village. She was a regular participant at regional folk singing competitions by age 15. She and Lekali participated in the competition at Butwal festival when she was 15; they won second prize. They then competed in Palpa festival where they won first prize. Sundarmani Adhikari, who was also a participant at the event, noticed her and later persuaded her family to send her to Pokhara under his guardianship. In April 2004, they competed together at Lekhnath festival in Pokhara and won first prize. He then took her to Kathmandu to start a professional career. Prior to meeting Adhikari, Majhi had already recorded her first song "Aamale Arti Dine Ghar Jane Bela" at Phewa Digital Studio in Pokhara.

=== Professional career ===
In Kathmandu, she earned Rs 2,500 per song in the early days. She had become a successful folk singer by 2007–08. She started earning Rs 6,000 per song, recording as many as 5–6 songs a day. She won Best Folk Singer Award at the Kalika FM Music Awards in 2008, and again in 2012. In 2011, "Shital Dine Pipal Sami Cha" and "Phul Ramro Gulabko", sung with Yaam Chhetri, became popular; the former was the most listened folk song of that year. Her 2012 song "Euta Aatma Cha", sung with Pashupati Sharma for the album Campus Padhna Aaune, was also popular.

Her 2018 song "Salko Patko Tapari Huni" set the record for most viewed Nepali folk duet on Youtube, amassing 30 million views within six months. By early 2020, it had reached 50 million views. It won Folk Record of the Year Award at the 23rd annual Hits FM Music Awards. She had previously been nominated in 2018 in the same category, but did not win. "Lalumai" was also popular; it reached 10 million views in the first month of its release.

By 2019, Majhi was earning a salary of Rs 50,000 (US $400) per song, making her the highest paid singer in Nepal. She was recording around half a dozen songs a month. In mid-2019, her salary doubled to Rs 100,000 per song.

=== Professional image ===
Majhi's contemporaries have attributed her popularity to her "authentic voice" suited to Nepali folk music. Her colleagues have praised her work ethic.

== Personal life ==
She was noticed by singer/composer Sundar Mani Adhikari at the folk singing competition in Palpa festival, who later took her to Kathmandu to turn her into a professional singer. After living with him for eight years, she married him on 15 December 2011 (29 Mangsir 2068 BS) in a private ceremony in Ram Temple, Pokhara. She has twin sons born around 2015–16.

She has lived a private life since the beginning of her career. She can only be contacted indirectly through her husband, who negotiates all her contracts and manages her schedules. When going out in public, she wears face mask and a scarf to hide her face. She does not give concerts or attend other public functions, despite a high demand nationally and internationally. She has only one publicly released photograph, used for marketing. She has no social media presence, and gives no interviews. She has been referred to as the "Anonymous Superstar" or the "Mystery Queen" of Nepali music.

Her absence from public life prompted speculation that she might be being controlled and abused by her husband. This led the Chief District Officer of Syangja to intervene. The couple was interviewed at the District Administration Office on 6 January 2019, where she was reunited with her father after 11 years. According to the Police, Majhi attributed her choice of a private life to her lack of a formal education, and her trust in her husband's better-educated decisions. Their inter-caste marriage was given as the reason for her estrangement from her kin. She was asked to remove her face mask and scarf for physical examination; the Police said that there were no signs of physical violence on her face. One of the interviewers, Superintendent of Police Rajkumar Lamsal, said Adhikari answered most of the questions asked to Majhi, and that it was hard to conclude Majhi was living a free life.

== Awards ==
Year	Award	Category	Nominated work	Result	Ref.
2008	Kalika Music Awards 2065	Best Folk Singer	—	Won	
2012	Kalika FM Music Award 2069	Best Folk Singer	—	Won	
2018	Hits FM Music Awards	Folk Record of the Year	Pardesh No. 7	Nominated	
2020	Hits FM Music Awards	Folk Record of the Year	"Salko Patko Tapari Huni"	Won	
2021	Prabal Jansewa Shree	Best Folk Singer	"Nepali folk singer"	Won	

== Discography ==
Year	Album	Song	Other artists	Label	Ref.
2007	Paschim Purvako	"Paschim Purvako"	Kulendra BK	Dhaulagiri Cassette Centre	
2007	Nyauli Ruda Yo Man Runcha Ni	"Dada Wari Jun Bhayo Ta Dada Pari Gham"	Kamal Khanal, Raju Pariyar	Dhaulagiri Cassette Centre	
2011	Sital Dine Pipal Sami Cha	"Sital Dine Pipal Sami Cha"	Yaam Chhetri		
2011	Phul Ramro Gulabko	"Phul Ramro Gulabko"	Yaam Chhetri	Samarpan Music	
2012	Campus Padhna Aaune	"Euta Aatma Chha"	Pashupati Sharma	Aashish Music	
2018	Salko Patko Tapari Huni	"Salko Patko Tapari Huni"	Kulendra Bishwakarma	Abhyas Digital	
2021	Putaliko Bhatti Vol 17	"Chari Jelaima"	Solo	Sapana Music	
2022	Putaliko Bhatti Vol 18	"Chari Jelaima-2"	Solo	Sapana Music	
2023	Putaliko Bhatti Vol 19	"Balama"	Solo	Sapana Music	
2024	Putaliko Bhatti Vol 20	"Aaina Aama Yo Teejaima"	Solo	Sapana Music	
2025	Putaliko Bhatti Vol 21	"Ma Ta Narauri"	Solo	Sapana Music	
2026	Putaliko Bhatti Vol 22	"Gharabara"	Solo	Sapana Music	
