= Jaya Devkota =

Nepalese folk singer

Jaya Devkota जय देवकोटा
- Born: 8 March 1992 (age 34); Khulunga-3, Rukum, Nepal
- Genres: folk
- Occupation: folk singer
- Instruments: Vocal; Harmonium; madal
- Years active: 2006–present

Jaya Bahadur Devkota, also sometimes known as Jaya Devkota or Jay Devkota, (Nepali: जय देवकोटा; born 8 March 1992) is a Nepalese folk singer. Born in Rukum, Devkota started his career in 2006 with the album Jeevan Bhayo Urath Bagara, Devkota has released more than 23 albums and more than 400 songs. His 2018 song "Barkha Lagechha" was nominated for a Sadhana Music Award.

== Awards ==
Year	Award	Category	Result	Ref.
2018	Sadhana Music Award	Best Music	Nominated	
2018	National Power News Music Award	Best folk singer	Won	
2019	Public Choice Award	Best folk singer	Won	
2020	National Power News Music Award	Best folk duet singer	Nominated	
2021	Box Office Dashain tihar Music Award	Best folk singer of the year	Won	
