= Mt. Everest Fashion Runway =

2020 fashion show

Mount Everest Fashion Runway is a fashion show held at an altitude of 5340 m at Kala Patthar, near the Everest Base Camp in Nepal. The first edition was launched during the Visit Nepal Year 2020 campaign and organized by KASA “FASHION BRAND” from Nepal in collaboration with the Nepal Tourism Board. Models from across the globe including Nepal, Italy, Finland, Singapore, and Sri Lanka attended the event. Miss Universe Sri Lanka 2018, Ornella Mariam Gunesekere, also walked in the ramp.

The primary motive behind hosting the event is to raise awareness regarding climate change, sustainable fashion and to boost the tourism.

The fashion show has received Guinness World Record for hosting the event in the highest altitude.

== Events ==
- A team of 48 people started trekked to Kalapathar from Luklaon January 18, 2020. To spread awareness, the team used bio-degradable clothes, detergent, shampoo, and also used solar technology to limit pollution. The entire journey was turned into a reality show.
- The second episode of the show is scheduled to be done on September 6, 2021, at Kala Patthar.
