= Prakash Saput =

Nepalese singer, songwriter, composer, and actor

Prakash Bishwakarma प्रकाश विश्वकर्मा
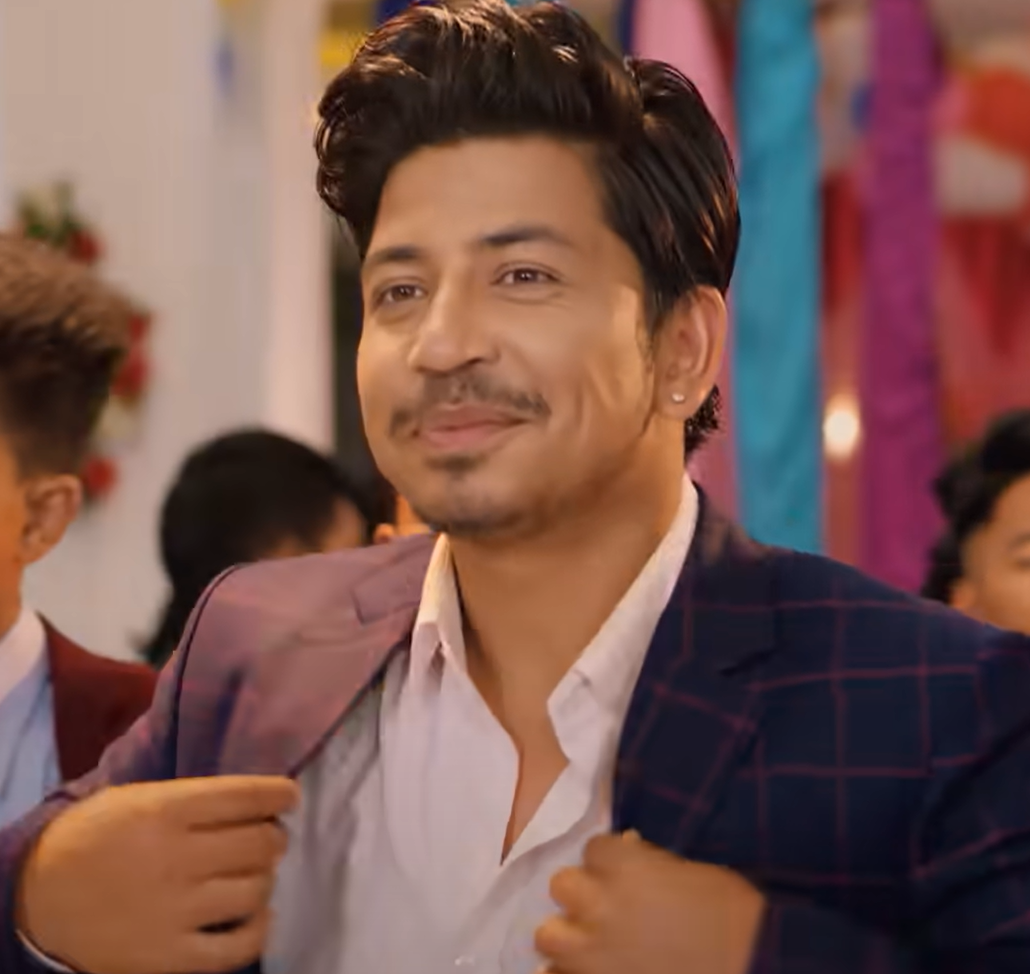
- Saput in a music video of Gulab Ko Phool in 2021

Background information
- Born: September 14, 1990 (age 36); Nepal
- Genres: Folk; popular
- Occupations: Singer; songwriter; composer; record producer; actor; model
- Instrument: Vocals
- Years active: 2011-present
- Spouse: Bindu Bohara

Prakash Bishwakarma (Nepali: प्रकाश विश्वकर्मा कामि), better known as Prakash Saput (Nepali: प्रकाश सपुत) is a Nepalese singer, composer, model, and actor, known for his contribution towards Nepali folk music. He is known for raising social and political awareness through his music. He gained recognition from the masses with the song Bola Maya in 2018. Since then he has produced numerous hit folk songs raising his status as one of the most popular singer in Nepal and Nepali diaspora worldwide. He made his debut in Nepali movie with Pardesi 2 (2023) which was commercially successful and appeared in socio-drama Purna Bahadur ko Sarangi (2024) which broke many records at the box office and went on to become the highest-grossing Nepali movie of all time.

== Personal life ==
Prakash Saput comes from a Dalit family, because of which he experienced caste-related discrimination in his early life. Since his childhood, he has enjoyed singing and dancing in local occasions in his village. When he was a kid, he wanted to be an actor. His childhood favourite actor was Dilip Rayamajhi; seeing him, he wanted to become an actor. He also worked as a RJ for Dhaulagiri FM, where he hosted a program called Just for You, where his responsibilities involved writing and presenting plays, as well as recording and mixing audio. He eventually relocated to Kathmandu, where he was able to pursue his singing career. He has changed the surname to "Saput" as a rebellious action to eradicate the caste discrimination in society and to become a catchy among the audiences.

Prakash is married and lives with his wife, Bindu Bohara, and their two kids in Kathmandu. They initially faced challenges to their marriage due to inter-caste marriage.

== Career ==
Saput released his debut album in 2011. Gari Khana Deu, his first song, was about social issues. However, his first release was Musu Musu Na Hasa, which was a folk song. Nearly a decade later, he gained recognition by a mass audience with the release of songs like Dohori Battle in 2018, Bola Maya in 2018, Galbandi Chyatiyo in 2019, Phuteka Chura in 2020, Mero Pani Haina Ra Yo Desh in 2021, Kura Bujhna Parcha (2021), Pir in 2022, and Sakambari in 2023.

== Honors ==
Saput was appointed by the Nepal Tourism Board as Goodwill Ambassador for (Gandaki Province) for Visit Nepal 2020.

In 2021, Saput was appointed as Goodwill Ambassador for National Disaster Risk Reduction and Management Authority (NDRMA) of Nepal Government.

Saput was also awarded with Janasewa Shri by the Government of Nepal in 2022 for his outstanding contribution to Nepali music.

== Partial discography ==
All songs are credited as singer unless otherwise noted.

| Year | Song | Notes | Ref(s) |
|---|---|---|---|
| 2011 | Gari Khana Deu | First recorded song | |
| 2011 | Musu Musu Hasi Deu | First released song | |
| 2016 | Makur Makur Ghur | Vocal and lyrics | |
| 2017 | Charara Barara Dharara | | |
| 2018 | Dohori Battle | | |
| 2018 | Bola Maya | | |
| 2019 | Galbandi Chyatiyo | | |
| 2019 | Jahajaima Chadhera | | |
| 2019 | Dohori Battle 2 | | |
| 2020 | Phuteka Chura | | |
| 2020 | Badala Barilai | Lyrics and music | |
| 2021 | Mero Pani Haina Ra Yo Desh | | |
| 2021 | Kura Bujhna Parchha | Lyrics and music | |
| 2021 | Dada Ghare Saili | Music video model | |
| 2022 | Pir | | |
| 2023 | Sakambari | | |
| 2023 | Damai Maharaj | | |
| 2023 | Jale Rumal Fatyo | Lyrics and music | |
| 2026 | Kartavya (Mero Pani Haina Ra Yo Desh 2) | | |

== Filmography ==
Credited as an actor, unless otherwise noted.

Key

| † | Denotes films that have not yet been released |

| Year | Film | Role | Notes | Ref(s) |
|---|---|---|---|---|
| 2023 | Pardeshi 2 | | Debut film | |
| 2024 | Purna Bahadur Ko Sarangi | | Highest Grossing Nepali Movie | |
| 2025 | Basanta | | | |
| 2026 | Lalibazar | | Music Director | |
| 2026 | Paral Ko Aago | | Actor | |
| 2026 | Mirmire | | Actor | |

== See also ==
- Dohori
- Music of Nepal
