= Himal Sagar =

Nepalese singer, composer and lyricist

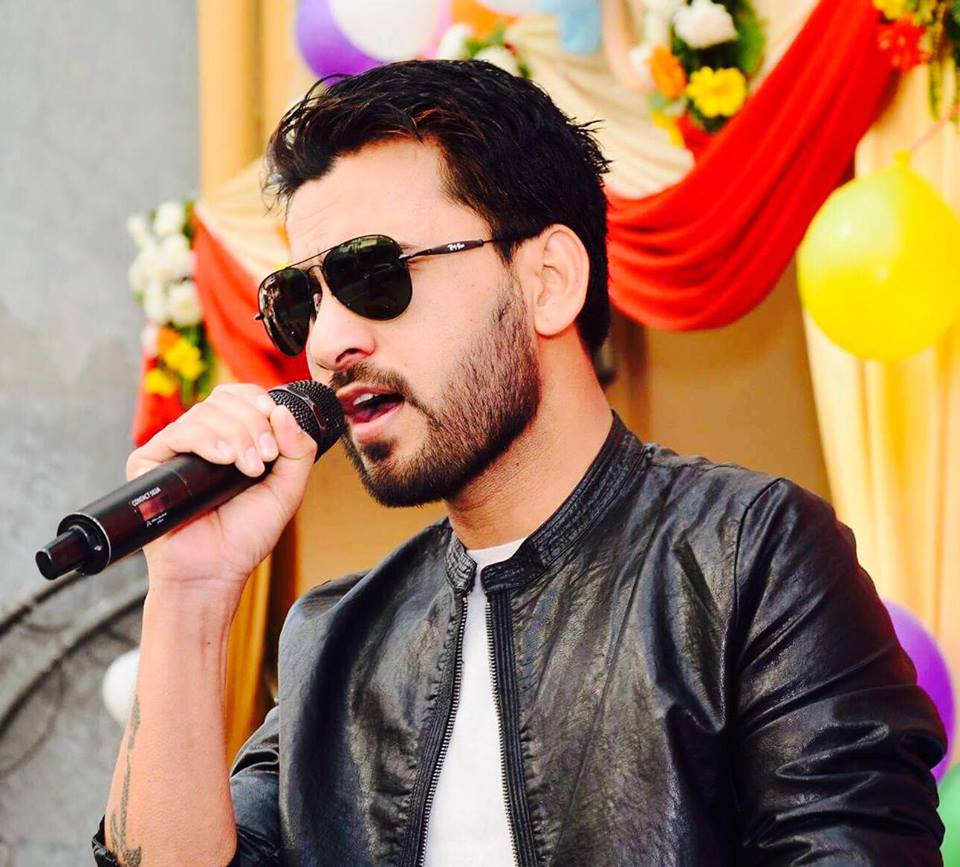
- Himal Sagar performing
- Born: Himal Gautam; 24 October 1980 (age 45); Jhapa, Nepal
- Education: Tribhuvan University
- Occupations: Composer, singer, lyricist
- Years active: 2005–present

Himal Gautam known widely as Himal Sagar (Nepali: हिमाल सागर; born 24 October 1980) is a Nepalese pop and modern singer, music composer and lyricist. He released his first original music album ‘Relation’ in September 2003. Of the 8 songs in the album, ‘Na Maile Lekhe, Na Unle Lekhin’ was one of the massive hits of that year. Since then, he has released 7 solo music albums whilst working on various collection albums as singer, songwriter and composer. Sagar alongside Ram Krishna Dhakal toured Europe in 2016 for musical events. Sagar was on a music tour in Europe, Australia, Canada and other countries as part of his World Music Tour for 2020.

== Early life ==
Himal was born in Eastern region of Nepal – Baniyani – 4, Jhapa. He completed his School Leaving Certificate from Shree Laxmi Ma. Vi., Baniyai-4, Jhapa. He continued his further education in Mechi Multiple Campus, Bhadrapur, Jhapa affiliated to Tribhuvan University. He is one of 7 siblings and the only one to involve in music.

== Discography ==
- Relation (2003)
- For You (2006)
- Tyo Din (2008)
- Tell Me (2011)
- Last (2012, compilation)
- Kahani (2013)
- True Love (2013, compilation)
- Fulee (2014)
- 24 Oct (2016)
- Timro Choli ko Tunama (2017) – Solo Track
- I am Sorry (2017) – Solo Track
- Maya Ta (2017) – Solo Track
- Bhanne Garthe (2018) – Solo Track
- Parkhina Garo Bho (2018) – Solo Track
- Baja (2018) – Solo Track
- Kafal Ko Danaa (2019) – Solo Track
- A Maya (2019) – Solo Track
- A Hora Maya (2023) – Duet
- Aaha Kati Ramri (2023) – Duet
- Mai Raja Timi Rani (2023) – Duet
- Aaha Maya (आहा माया) (2023) – Duet

== Awards ==
Year	Award	Category	Result	Ref.
2009	Kalika Music Award	Best Vocal Male Pop	Won	
2004	Machhapuchhre FM Dhuk Dhuki Pop Award	Best male Vocal	Won	
2017	Kalika FM music award	Best pop music	Won	
2019	Young Mind Entertainment award	Best Male Singer	Won	
2023	Bindabasini Music Award	Best Duet singers	Won	
2024	Genius Music Award	Best Pop Singer	Won	
2024	Radio Kantipur National Music Award	Best Pop Singer	Nominated	
2024	Natikaji Rastriya Samman Tatha Puraskar	National Music Award	Won	

== Philanthropy ==
Himal Sagar has participated in various social activities so as to generate fund for various causes. Notably, a fund raiser to build 1000 homes for those displaced due to the Nepal Earthquake of 2015 organized by NRNA Oman in the occasion of New Year 2016. Similarly, he also performed in charity event in Cyprus. In addition, he also donated various stationary materials to the disabled children at Aapanga Baal Sikshya Sarokar Kendra in the year 2017.
