= Badri Pangeni =

Nepalese folk singer

- Born: Nawalparasi
- Occupation: Folk singer
- Awards: Music Khabar Music Award

Badri Pangeni (Nepali: बद्री पंगेनी) is a Nepalese folk singer. He was born in Nawalparasi but raised and done schooling in Palpa. Pangeni was president of Nepal Folk Duet Academy. He was elected as president of Nepal Folk Duet Academy on 28 September 2016. Pangeni came Kathmandu on 1998 after completing his School Leaving Certificate (Nepal) and worked on Pukar dohori sanjh for six years. His first album was "Tansen khaseuli". Pangeni, who has sung more than 5 dozen songs, has sung 'Tansen Kasauli', 'PN Campus', 'Beauty Number One', 'Khyal Khyalmai Dil Basyo Kanchi Salima', 'Photo Firta Leu', 'Lau Cheli Rato Lau', 'Aajhai Ni Gadatantra Aako Chhaina Hai'. Including many are popular.

== Awards ==
| Year | Award | Category | Result | Ref. |
|---|---|---|---|---|
| 2015 | Music Khabar Music Award | Best Folk Singer | Won | |

== Discography ==
- Aajhai Ni Gadatantra Aako Chhaina Hai
- Sasurlima - With Sindhu Malla
- Beauty Number One
- Dui Paila - with Prakash Saput
- Maipani Amale
