= Shree Janata Higher Secondary School =

Secondary school in Nepal

Location
- Rupandehi District, Lumbini Province; Nepal

Information
- School type: State secondary school

Shree Janata Higher Secondary School is a public high school in the West Amawa, Ward number 6, Rupandehi, Nepal.
