= Pashupati Sharma =

Nepalese folk singer

Pashupati Sharma पशुपति शर्मा
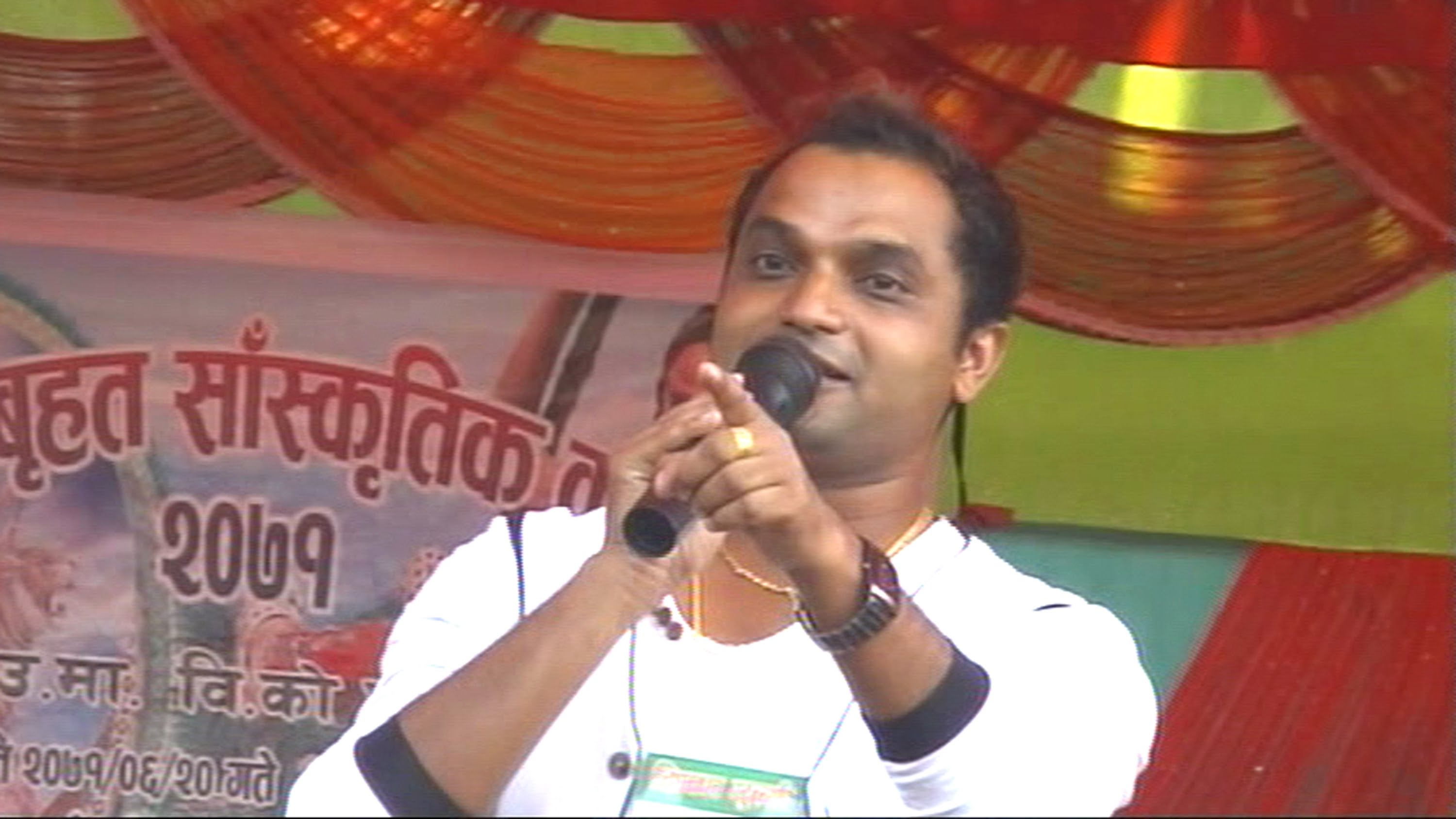
- Pashupati Sharma in 2018

Background information
- Born: 31 October 1982 (age 42); Putalibazar Municipality −3 Sauthar, Syangja Nepal
- Genres: Folk
- Occupation: Folk Singer
- Instrument(s): Vocals, harmonium and madal
- Years active: 2003–present

Pashupati Sharma is a Nepalese folk singer born on 31 October 1982 in Putalibazar Municipality Ward Number 3 of Syangja District, Nepal. Sharma moved to Kathmandu on 2003 for his further studies, as he was interested in singing. He started singing in Saptakoshi Dohori Sanjh (a duet folk singing club) and released his first official song on 2003. Sharma has already sung more than 200 songs during his career. His songs revolves around patriotism, love and satire. One of his latest satire song Lutna Sake Lut was recently forced to remove from YouTube. He is the living legend of folk music industry of Nepal. In 2018 he released song "Chhata harayo" with Devi Gharti Magar.

== Awards ==
- Image Award for Best Folk Dohori Song
- Radio Kantipur Music Award for Best Folk Singer
