= Dohori =

Nepalese folk music genre

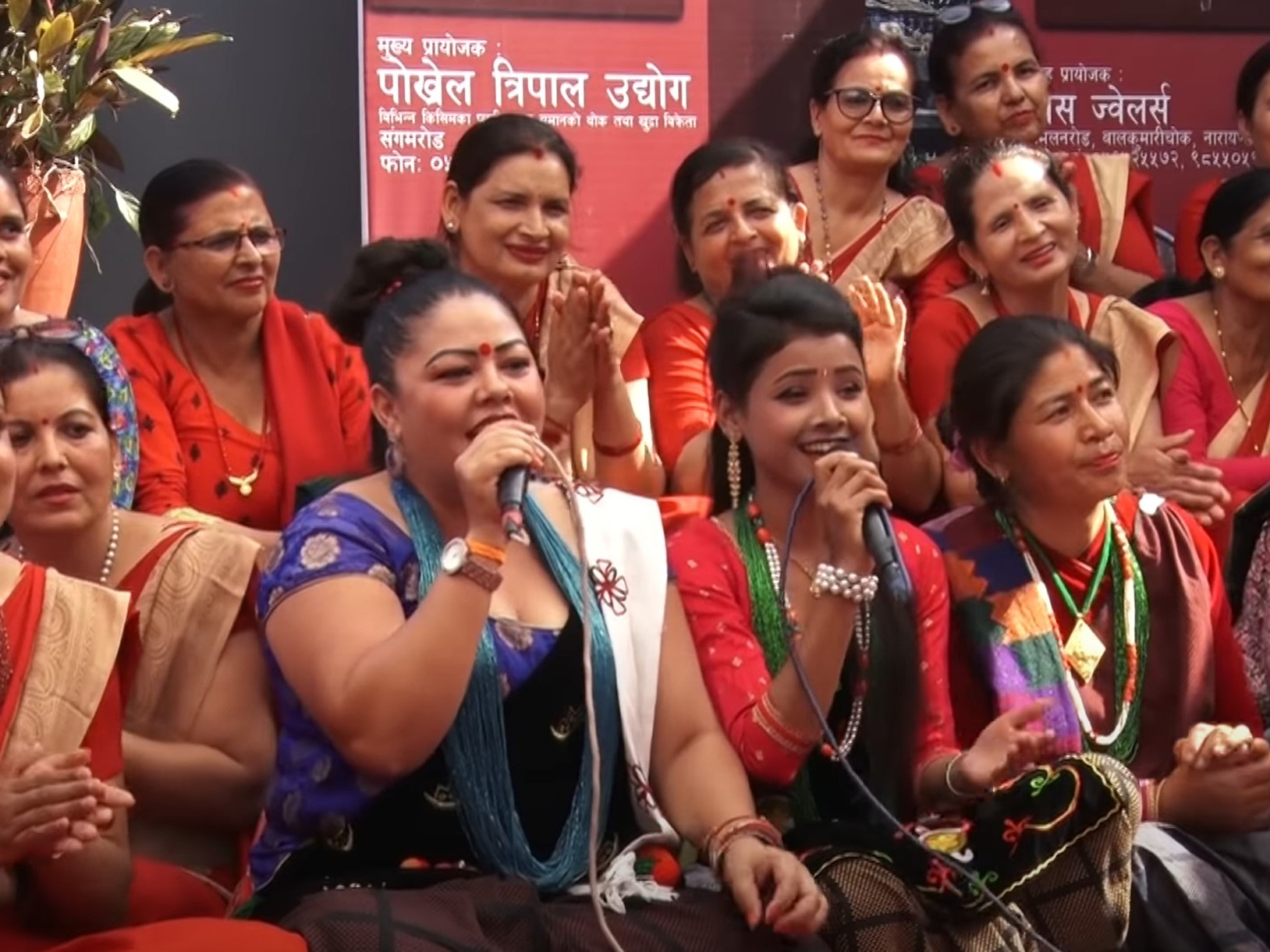
Women's team singing Dohori

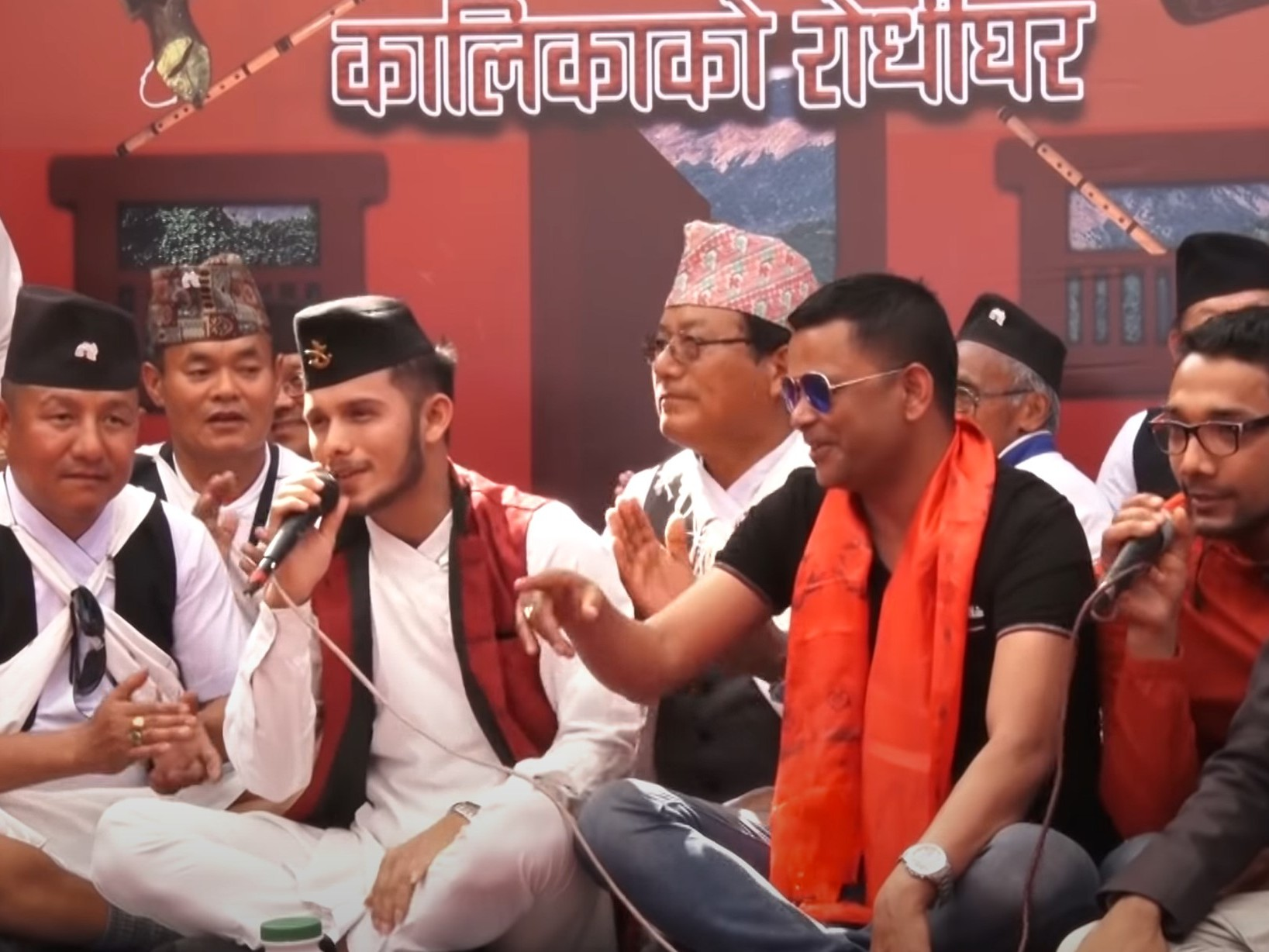
Men's team singing Dohori

Dohori (Nepali: दोहोरी, romanized: dohorī pronounced [doɦoɾi] or [doːɾi]) is a Nepali type of music usually sung by two teams, usually one comprising men and the other women. It is in the form of question and answer where a team sings a question and the opponent replies through an equally lyrical impromptu couplet and vice versa. The term dohori, means 'back and forth' and refers to the exchange of lyrical phrases between the contesting singers. The song production is collaborative and involves many individuals.

Like all Nepali folk songs, dohori originated in the rural areas of Nepal and is now sung in both rural and urban settlements and is popular amongst the Nepali speaking diaspora in the UK, US, and Bahrain. The men and women sit on opposite sides and the goal is to keep improvising until one team runs out of witty answers. The dohori is said to have stretched to seven days and nights during the past.

Dohori is sung on a repeating main phrase of a well-known folk song but the song is adapted as the questions are posed and answered. Teams may also be male vs. male (bhale dohori), female vs. female (pothi dohori) or in mixed genders (rally dohori). Beyond subjects among love, tragedy, society, politics and development in its lyrics, dohori also makes extensive, often non-sequitur references, to subjects such as cultural traditions, cuisines, idioms and proverbs, native plants and animals among other phenomena to rhyme verses. This in turn has also influenced the lyrical nature of modern Nepali songs.

== See also ==
- Ratyoli
- Music of Nepal
