= List of Nepali singers =

This is an alphabetical list of notable Nepali-language singers. These vocal artists are from the Nepal, Sikkim and Nepali-speaking regions of India, Bhutan; some belong to the immigrant population living abroad.

== A ==
- Bhakta Raj Acharya
- Milan Amatya
- Yogeshwar Amatya

== B ==
- Tilak Bam Malla
- Devika Bandana
- Tika Bhandari
- Nabin K Bhattarai
- Norden Tenzing Bhutia
- Om Bikram Bista
- Babu Bogati

== C ==
- Bipul Chettri
- Rohit John Chhetri
- Nalina Chitrakar

== D ==
- Dipesh K. Shrestha
- Karna Das
- Danny Denzongpa
- Koili Devi
- Tara Devi
- Ram Krishna Dhakal
- Ani Choying Dolma
- Sunita Dulal

== G ==
- Jhalak Man Gandarbha
- Atithi Gautam K. C
- Bhumika Giri
- Narayan Gopal
- Amrit Gurung
- Ciney Gurung
- Khem Raj Gurung
- Kishor Gurung
- Mausami Gurung
- Prakash Gurung
- Sukmit Gurung

== J ==
- Udit Narayan Jha
- Indira Joshi

== K ==
- Bacchu Kailash
- Nati Kaji
- Mallika Karki
- Peter J. Karthak
- Ram Prasad Khanal
- Pramod Kharel
- Kamal Khatri
- Kiran Pradhan (Dr)

== L ==
- Aruna Lama
- Raju Lama

== M ==
- Muna Thapa Magar
- Bishnu Majhi
- Tilak Bam Malla
- Kunti Moktan
- Zascha Moktan

== N ==
- Udit Narayan
- Natikaji

== P ==
- Anju Panta
- Raju Pariyar
- Sugam Pokharel
- Bednidhi Poudel
- Prem Dhoj Pradhan
- Adrian Pradhan
- Shanti Shree Pariyar

== R ==
- Bartika Eam Rai
- Dhiraj Rai
- Rajesh Payal Rai
- Sabin Rai
- Shambhu Rai
- Phatteman Rajbhandari
- Gyanu Rana
- Sashi Rawal
- Nima Rumba

== S ==
- Shiva Pariyar
- Arjun Sapkota
- Panna Kaji Shakya
- Shiva Shankar
- Deep Shrestha
- Narayan Bhakta Shrestha
- Nirnaya Shrestha
- Prakash Shrestha
- Seturam Shrestha
- Sushma Shrestha
- Manila Sotang
- Abhaya Subba
- Phiroj Shyangden

== T ==
- Prashant Tamang
- Arun Thapa
- Dharmaraj Thapa
- Pranil L Timalsena
- Ram Man Trishit
- Ram Thapa
- Robin Tamang
- Shanti Thatal
- Trishna Gurung

== V ==
- Sajjan Raj Vaidya

== W ==
- Hira Devi Waiba
- Navneet Aditya Waiba

== Y ==
- Visan Yonjan
- Gopal Yonzon

== See also ==
- List of bands from Nepal
- List of Nepalese singers
