= List of Nepalese singers =

This is a list of Nepalese singers and musicians.

== A ==
- Bhakta Raj Acharya
- Milan Amatya

== B ==
- Tilak Bam Malla
- Devika Bandana
- Tika Bhandari
- Nabin K Bhattarai
- Om Bikram Bista
- Babina Bhattarai

== C ==
- Rohit John Chhetri
- Nalina Chitrakar

== D ==
- Karna Das
- Koili Devi
- Tara Devi
- Ani Choying Dolma
- Sunita Dulal

== G ==
- Amber Gurung
- Amrit Gurung
- Atithi Gautam K. C
- Bhumika Giri
- Ciney Gurung
- Jhalak Man Gandarbha
- Khem Raj Gurung
- Kishor Gurung
- Mausami Gurung
- Malewa Devi Gurung
- Narayan Gopal
- Prakash Gurung
- Praveen Gurung
- Sukmit Gurung
- Trishna Gurung

== K ==
- Bacchu Kailash
- Nati Kaji
- Mallika Karki
- Ram Prasad Khanal
- Pramod Kharel
- Kamal Khatri

== L ==
- Raju Lama

== M ==
- Muna Thapa Magar
- Bishnu Majhi
- Tilak Bam Malla
- Kunti Moktan
- Zascha Moktan

== N ==
- Natikaji

== P ==
- Arjan Pandey
- Anju Panta
- Raju Pariyar
- Sugam Pokharel
- Bednidhi Poudel
- Prem Dhoj Pradhan
- Adrian Pradhan

== R ==
- Bartika Eam Rai
- Dhiraj Rai
- Pratik Himal Rai
- Rajesh Payal Rai
- Sabin Rai
- Shambhu Rai
- Phatteman Rajbhandari
- Gyanu Rana
- Sashi Rawal
- Nima Rumba

== S ==
- Arjun Sapkota
- Panna Kaji Shakya
- Shiva Shankar
- Deep Shrestha
- Narayan Bhakta Shrestha
- Nirnaya Shrestha
- Prakash Shrestha
- Seturam Shrestha
- Sushma Shrestha
- Manila Sotang
- Abhaya Subba
- Phiroj Shyangden

== T ==
- Arun Thapa
- Dharmaraj Thapa
- Tirtha Kumari Thapa
- Pranil L Timalsena
- Ram Man Trishit
- Ram Thapa
- Robin Tamang

== V ==
- Sajjan Raj Vaidya

== W ==
- Navneet Aditya Waiba

== Y ==
- Visan Yonjan

== See also ==
- List of bands from Nepal
- List of Nepalese people
