= Bahun =

Ethnic group in Nepal

Hill Brahmins
Bahun

Regions with significant populations
- Nepal: 3,292,373 (11.2% of Nepal's population) (2021)

Languages
- Nepali (Khas-Kura)

Religion
- Hinduism 99.56% (2011), Christianity 0.31% (2011)

Related ethnic groups
- Chhetri, Thakuri and other Khas people

Bahun (Nepali: बाहुन), also known as Hill Brahmins, are a Brahmin varna of Nepal. While their origins are disputed, the traditional view is that they arrived from India during the fourteenth century. Janajati activists usually view the Khas Aryas as migrants, while most Khas Arya academics-cum-activists claim that the group has always lived in Nepal. According to the 2011 Nepal census, Bahun is the second most populous group after Chhetri.

According to 1854 Muluki Ain, the first Nepalese civil code, Bahuns were regarded as caste among sacred thread bearers (Tagadhari) and twice-born Hindus.

== Origin ==
Traditionally, Bahuns were members of the Khas community together Chhetris. Possibly due to political power of the Khasa Malla kingdom, Khas Brahmins and Khas Kshatriyas had high social status in the present-day western Nepal. Bahuns, regarded as upper class Khas group together with Chhetris, were associated mostly with the Gorkha Kingdom and its expansion.

There appears to be general agreement in historical records and family genealogy that Hill Brahmins (both Purbia and Kumai Bahuns) migrated from the Gangetic Plains to the western Himalayas then from there to the eastern Himalayas including Nepal. Nepali historians have claimed that Hill Brahmins entered the Himalayan region from Kannauj. According to Acharya Bamsavali, Bahuns have migrated from Kanyakubja to Jumla in Nepal.

== Demography ==
According to the 2011 Nepal census, Bahuns (referred as Hill-Brahmin) are the second most populous group after Khas Chhetri with 12.2% of Nepal's population (or 3,226,903 people). Bahun are the second largest Hindu group in Nepal with a population of 3,212,704 (99.6% of Bahuns). Bahuns are the largest group in 15 districts in Nepal: Jhapa, Morang, Kathmandu, Chitwan, Nawalparasi, Rupandehi, Kaski, Syangja, Parbat, Gulmi and Arghakhanchi. Among these, Bahuns in Parbat (35.7%), Arghakhanchi (32.8%), Dhading (30.9%), Chitwan (28.6%), Kaski (27.8%) and Gulmi (25.2%) consist more than 25% of the district population. Kathmandu has largest Bahun population with 410,126 people (23.5%).

Bahuns have the highest civil service representation with 39.2% of Nepal's bureaucracy while having only 12.1% of Nepal's total population. The civil service representation to population ratio is 3.2 times for Bahuns which is fourth in Nepal. Khas Chhetris represent 1.6 times in civil services to their percentage of population, which is the highest in Nepal. As per the Public Service Commission, Brahmins (33.3%) and Chhetris (20.01%) were two largest caste group to obtain governmental jobs in F.Y. 2017-18 even though 45% governmental seats are reserved for women, indigenous and ethnic minorities, Madhesis, dalits, people with disability and those from the backward regions. Similarly, in the fiscal 2018–19, Bahuns (24.87%) and Chhetris (9.63%) maintained 35% of their proportion in civil service as per Public Service Commission.

== Geographic distribution ==
According to the 2021 Nepal census, 3,292,373 people (11.29%) of the population of Nepal are Bahun (Hill Brahmins). The frequency of Bahun (Hill Brahmins) by province was as follows:

- Gandaki Province (21.5%)
- Bagmati Province (18.3%)
- Sudurpashchim Province (13.0%)
- Lumbini Province (12.5%)
- Koshi Province (12.1%)
- Karnali Province (8.3%)
- Madhesh Province (2.3%)

The frequency of Bahun (Hill Brahmins) was higher than national average (12.2%) in the following districts:

- Parbat (35.8%)
- Arghakhanchi (32.8%)
- Syangja (30.9%)
- Chitwan (28.7%)
- Kaski (27.9%)
- Jhapa (23.8%)
- Nawalpur (23.8%)
- Kathmandu (23.7%)
- Kavrepalanchok (21.5%)
- Gulmi (21.3%)
- Baglung (19.5%)
- Nuwakot (19.0%)
- Baitadi (18.6%)
- Palpa (17.5%)
- Kalikot (17.1%)
- Darchula (16.7%)
- Kanchanpur (16.0%)
- Rupandehi (15.9%)
- Dadeldhura (15.8%)
- Gorkha (15.2%)
- Rasuwa (15.2%)
- Dhading (15.0%)
- Bhaktapur (14.2%)
- Makwanpur (14.1%)
- Ilam (13.9%)
- Terhathum (13.3%)
- Morang (13.1%)
- Lalitpur (13.0%)
- Lamjung (12.8%)
- Kailali (12.4%)

== Notable people ==
=== Academics ===
- Surya Subedi, legal academic

=== Artists ===
- Ragini Upadhyaya, fine artist and lyricist

=== Athletes ===
==== Cricketers ====
- Basanta Regmi
- Kanishka Chaugai
- Sandeep Lamichhane
- Kushal Bhurtel

==== Other athletes ====
- Shyam Dhakal, alpine skier

=== Entertainment ===
==== Actors/Filmmakers ====
- Nabin k. Bhattarai
- Neeta Dhungana
- Aryan Sigdel
- Arunima Lamsal
- Jeevan Luitel
- Sitaram Kattel(dhurmus)
- Kunjana Ghimire(suntali)
- Anup Baral
- Jeetu Nepal
- Kedar Ghimire
- Keki Adhikari
- Nisha Adhikari
- Bijay Baral
- Raj Ballav Koirala
- Khagendra Lamichhane
- Marishka Pokharel
- Sunil Pokharel
- Usha Poudel
- Deepika Prasain
- Hari Prasad Rimal
- Aanchal Sharma
- Anna Sharma
- Pooza Sharma
- Reecha Sharma
- Mithila Sharma
- Barsha Siwakoti
- Hari Bansha Acharya
- Dayaram Dahal
- Subash Gajurel
- Tulsi Ghimire
- Manisha Koirala
- Deepa Shree Niraula

==== Singers ====
- Tika Bhandari
- Ram Prasad Khanal
- Pramod Kharel
- Nabin K Bhattarai
- Bhakta Raj Acharya
- Sugam Pokharel
- Bednidhi Poudel
- Pranil L Timalsena

==== Other entertainers ====
- Atul Gautam, tabla player
- Hom Nath Upadhyaya, tabla player

=== Humanitarians ===
- Durga Ghimire, founder of ABC Nepal, an anti-sex trafficking organisation
- Jagadish Ghimire, political analyst, founder of Tamakoshi Sewa Samiti community development organisation
- Anuradha Koirala, founder of Maiti Nepal, which supports victims of sex trafficking

=== Politicians ===
- Ravi Lamichhane
- Chabilal Upadhyaya
- Ranga Nath Poudyal
- Krishna Prasad Koirala and Koirala family
- Matrika Prasad Koirala
- Tanka Prasad Acharya
- Bishweshwar Prasad Koirala
- Girija Prasad Koirala
- Krishna Prasad Bhattarai
- Man Mohan Adhikari
- KP Sharma Oli
- Pushpa Kamal Dahal (Prachanda)
- Madhav Kumar Nepal
- Baburam Bhattarai

=== Scientists ===
- Bodhraj Acharya, biochemist
- Lujendra Ojha, planetary scientist

=== Writers ===
- Khagendra Sangraula

==== Poets ====
- Bhanubhakta Acharya
- Geeta Tripathee
- Gopal Prasad Rimal
- Ishwar Ballav Bhattarai
- Jagadish Ghimire
- Krishnahari Baral
- Kshetra Pratap Adhikary
- Laxmi Prasad Devkota
- Lekhnath Paudyal
- Mahananda Sapkota
- Motiram Bhatta
- Suman Pokhrel

==== Journalists ====
- Kanak Mani Dixit
- Narayan Wagle
- Naresh Bhattarai
- Prashant Aryal
- Rabi Lamichhane
- Rabindra Mishra
- Sudheer Sharma
- Vijay Kumar Pandey

==== Playwrights ====
- Abhi Subedi
- Krishna Dharabasi
- Bhim Nidhi Tiwari
- Gopal Prasad Rimal
- Guru Prasad Mainali
- Khagendra Lamichhane
- Laxmi Prasad Devkota
- Suman Pokhrel

==== Prose writers ====
- Abhi Subedi
- Amar Neupane
- Arbind Rimal
- Samrat Upadhyay
- Sanu Sharma

=== Other notables ===
- Bhawana Ghimire, CEO of Cricket Association of Nepal from 2014 to 2016

== See also ==
- Caste system in Nepal
- Varna (Hinduism)

== Bibliography ==
- Dor Bahadur Bista (1991). Fatalism and Development: Nepal's Struggle for Modernization. Orient Blackswan. ISBN 978-81-250-0188-1.
- Subba, Tanka Bahadur (1989). Dynamics of a hill society: Nepalis in Darjeeling and Sikkim Himalayas. Mittal Publications. ISBN 9788173041143.
- John T Hitchcock (1978). "An Additional Perspective on the Nepali Caste System". In James F. Fisher (ed.). Himalayan Anthropology: The Indo-Tibetan Interface. Walter de Gruyter. ISBN 978-90-279-7700-7.
- Richard Burghart (1984). "The Formation of the Concept of Nation-State in Nepal". The Journal of Asian Studies. 44 (1): 101–125. doi:10.2307/2056748. JSTOR 2056748. S2CID 154584368.
- Whelpton, John (2005). A History of Nepal. Cambridge University Press. ISBN 978-0521804707.
- Sherchan, Sanjay (2001). Democracy, pluralism and Change: An Inquiry into Nepalese context. Chhye Pahhuppe. ISBN 9789993354390.
- Nepala Rajakiya Pragya Pratisthana (2001). Journal of Nepalese Literature, Art and Culture. Vol. 4. Nepal: Royal Nepal Academy.
- Witzel, Michael (1993). "Toward a History of the Brahmins". Journal of the American Oriental Society. 113 (2): 264–268. doi:10.2307/603031. ISSN 0003-0279. JSTOR 603031.
