= Budhanilkantha School =

- बूढानीलकण्ठ स्कूल
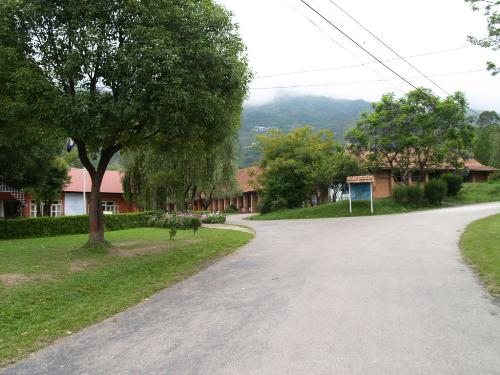
- Budhanilkantha School

Location
- Narayanthan - Baaghdwar Rd, Budhanilkantha 44622; Budhanilkantha, Bagmati Province 44622; Nepal, Nepal

Information
- School type: Boarding, Government funded non-profit school
- Motto: Centre of Excellence
- Established: 1972
- School district: Kathmandu
- Authorizer: Government of Nepal
- CEEB code: 689070
- Principal: Keshar Bahadur Khulal
- Staff: Approx. 200
- Faculty: Approx. 80
- Grades: 5-12, A-Level
- Gender: Coeducational
- Enrollment: 1136 total
- Sixth form students: 180
- Student to teacher ratio: 14:1
- Area: 95 acres (38 ha)
- Campus type: Boarding
- Houses: Makalu, Dhaulagiri, Hiunchuli, Saipal, Nilgiri, Pumori, Tilicho, Jugal, Choyu, Ratnachuli, Kanchenjunga, Annapurna, Byasrishi, Gaurishankar
- Student Council: Council of School Prefects
- Nickname: BNKS
- Publication: Bhanjyang
- Endowment: Funded by Government of Nepal and alums
- Graduates: Approximately 5000
- Affiliations: Secondary Education Examination (Grade 10); Cambridge International Examinations (A-level); Higher Secondary Education Board (10+2)
- Website: bnks.edu.np

Budhanilkantha School, often referred to as BNKS, is a boarding school in Nepal. It is located in Narayanthan, 8 kilometres north of Kathmandu, at the foothills of Shivapuri mountain (2,732 m [8,963 ft]). It is named after the Budhanilkantha Temple, which is located nearby.

One third of pupils admitted in grade five are granted scholarships based on need, after an entrance examination held in all the 77 districts of Nepal. This scholarship is granted every year to the students until grade 10.

== Academics ==
The school operates three courses of study:

1. School Leaving Certificate level (a nationwide curriculum up to class 10 prescribed by the Department of Education of Nepal),
2. Cambridge International A-Level
3. 10+2 Level (National Examination Board of Nepal, an equivalent alternative to A-Level).

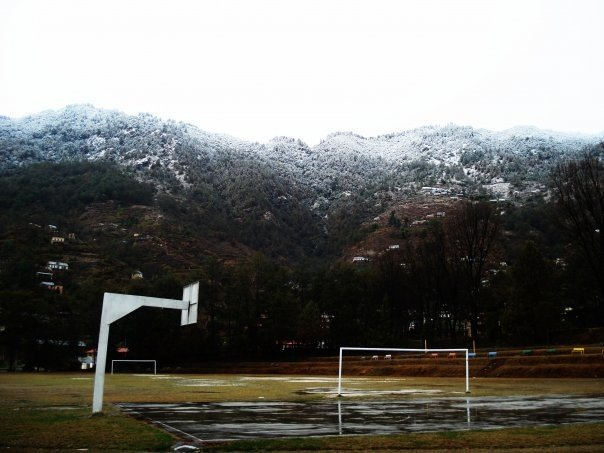
View of the snow-clad Shivapuri mountain from the Middle Pitch

Students must pass an entrance exam to gain admission into the school. Normally, entrance examinations are taken for entry into class 5 and post SLC levels. This is intended to maintain the school's high academic standards.

Out of 118 students who took the School Leaving Certificate Examination 2014, 103 secured Distinction and the remaining 15 students passed in the First Division.

Budhanilkantha School was the first school to introduce GCE Advanced Level in Nepal. It currently offers A-Levels in Physics, Chemistry, Biology, Mathematics, Further Mathematics, Economics, Business Studies, Computer Science, Accounting and English Language. It is compulsory for students to take exams in five subjects; Mathematics and English Language have to be studied by all students. Most students choose to study science-based subjects and some choose to combine sciences and social sciences. In A-Level exams of the year 2010, 12% of entries from the school secured grade A* and 30% entries secured grade A. 56% entries from the school secured more than or equal to grade B. 73% of the total entries, excluding General Paper, were in either math or science subjects. Budhanilkantha students regularly feature in the Cambridge Outstanding Learner Awards as the best achieving A-Level candidates in Nepal and worldwide.

== Governance ==
The present principal of the school is Keshar Khulal. There are two vice principals in the school: one each for Secondary Level (SL) and Basic Level (BL). The list of Headmasters/Principals of the school are as follows:

1. John B Tyson, Headmaster Designate (1966)
2. Peter J Wakeman, Headmaster (1972 to 1977)
3. Ken Jones, Headmaster (1978 to 1982)
4. Dr. Tej Ratna Kansakar, Acting Headmaster (1983)
5. John Tyson, Headmaster (1983 to 1988)
6. Brian Garton, Headmaster (1989 to 1992)
7. Thomas, Headmaster (1992 to 1994)
8. Satyanarayan Rajbhandari, Principal (1994 to 1995)
9. Narayan Prasad Sharma, Principal (1996 to 2012)
10. Keshar Khulal, Principal (2013 to 2019)
11. Hom Nath Acharya, Principal (2019 to 2023)
12. Keshar Bahadur Khulal, Principal (2024–present)

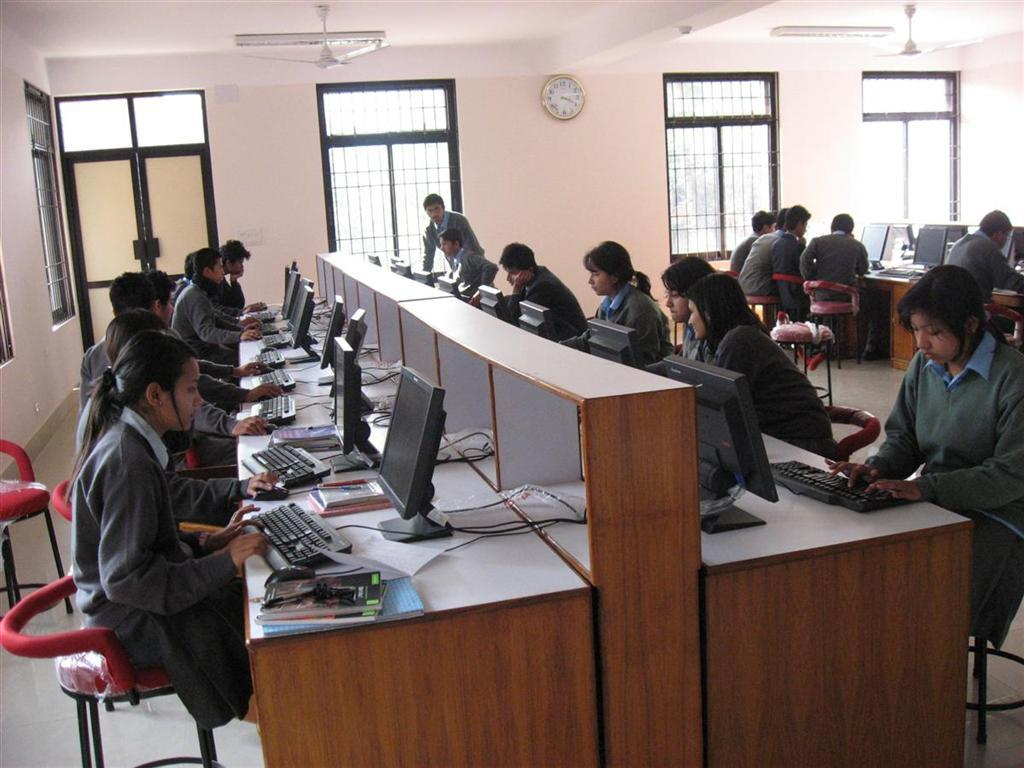
Students using the Learning Resource Centre

== Notable alumni ==
Budhanilkantha School's Alumni Association, called the 'Society for Ex-Budhanilkantha Students' (SEBS) is one of the most prominent alumni networks in the country, with more than 3500 members. It includes several prominent personalities in Nepal:

- Ujwal Thapa, late president of Bibeksheel Nepali
- Sumana Shrestha, former Minister of Education, Science and Technology, Nepal
- Swarnim Wagle, Minister of Finance, Nepal
- Jeevan Bahadur Shahi, former Chief Minister of Karnali State
- Pukar Malla, Member of National Planning Commission, Nepal
- Keshar Bahadur Khulal, Principal of Budhanilkantha School
- Sushant KC, Singer & Music Composer
- Nabin K Bhattarai, Singer, Composer & Songwriter
- Bartika Eam Rai, Singer
- Diwas Gurung, Guitarist, Producer & Singer
- Rochak Dahal, Singer, Songwriter & Frontman, Pahenlo Batti Muni
- Shirish Dali, Singer, Albatross
- Bhusan Dahal, Media personality
- Birendra Bahadur Basnet, Managing Director of Buddha Air
- Karun Thapa, Media and IT expert
- Srichchha Pradhan, Miss Nepal 2023
- Dipendra Bir Bikram Shah Dev, late King of Nepal
- Nirajan Bir Bikram Shah Dev, late Prince of Nepal
- Paras Bir Bikram Shah Dev, former Crown Prince of Nepal
