= Visan Yonjan =

Nepali singer-songwriter (born 1981)

Visan Yonjan भिसान योञ्जन
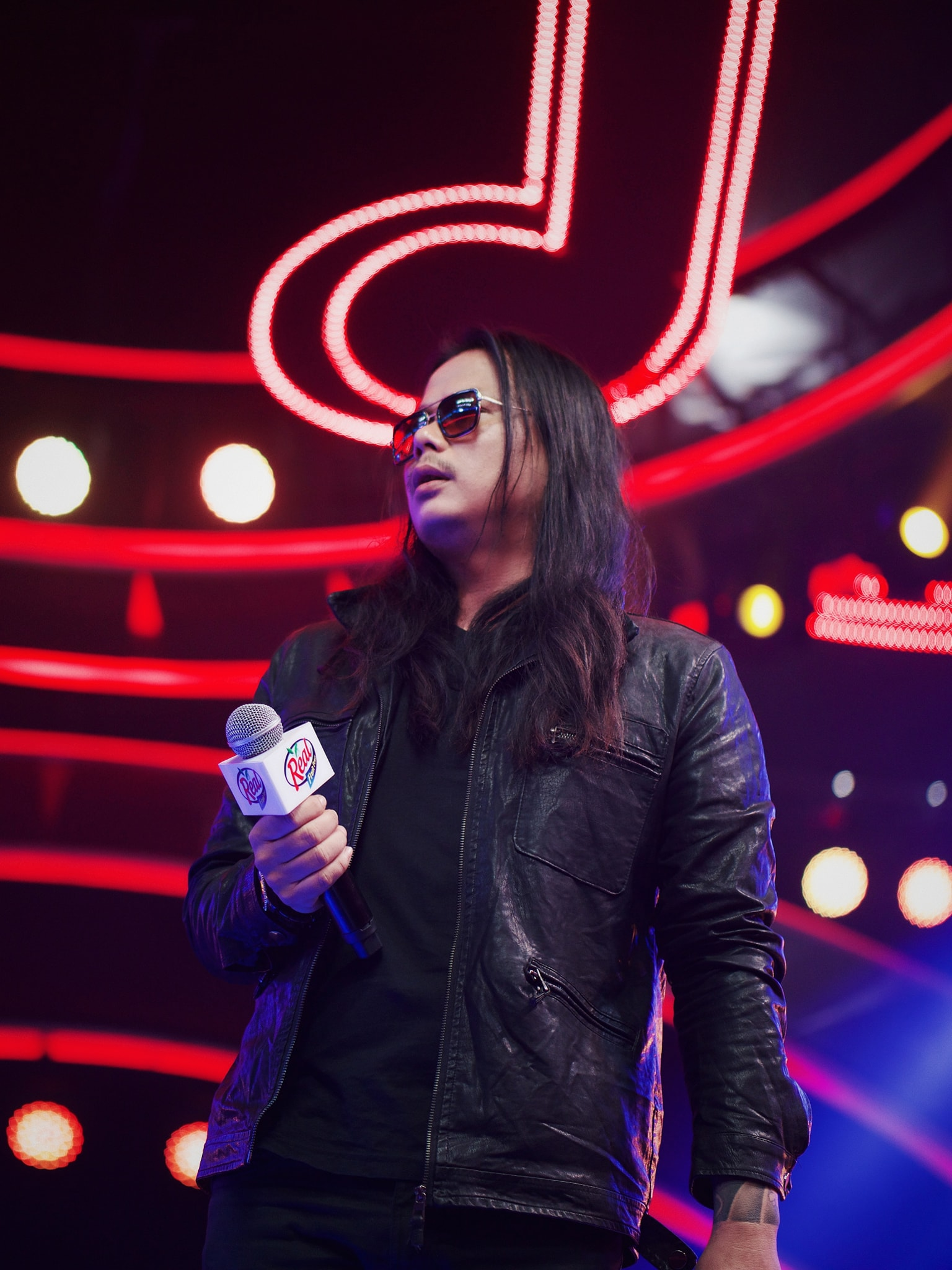
- Visan Yonjan in 2021

Background information
- Born: 2 October 1981 (age 45)
- Origin: Kathmandu, Nepal
- Genre: Rock
- Occupations: Singer-Songwriter, Composer, Music Video Director
- Instruments: Vocals, Guitar
- Years active: 2006–present
- Labels: Reeyaz Records, Phoenix Studio, Inline Creation Records
- Website: visanyonjan.com.np

Visan Yonjan (Nepali: भिसान योञ्जन; born 2 October 1981) is a Nepali singer-songwriter. He has been the frontman for two bands, Stond Amp and Visan N' The Groovers. He began his music career in 2006. He has worked with various Nepali artists like Nima Rumba, Mingma Sherpa, Ciney Gurung, Sugam Pokharel, Nabin K Bhattarai, Aastha B, Sudip Giri, Mt. 8848, Nishan Bhattarai, Sabin Rai, Elvis Joshi, Shreshan Shrestha (s2s).

== Early life ==
Visan Yonjan parents were Raju Yonjan and Meena Yonjan. After his graduation, he moved to Kathmandu with his family, finding musical inspiration from Bon Jovi, Sound Garden, Nirvana and Alter Bridge. Yonjan began to play gigs in local pubs inside Kathmandu city in the early period of his career. In 2006, he released his debut album Premiere.

== Recording career ==
=== 2006: Singing debut ===
Visan's career began as a pop singer when he signed up with Reeyaz Music Records and recorded a debut album in 2006 that brought him further into the limelight. He wrote and composed several songs for other artists such as Puja Rai, Raju Lama (The Angels band), Impluse 21, Aastha B, Elvis Joshi which were popular on TV channels.

=== 2008 – 2010 ===
Stoned Amp was formed in 2009, a rock band he formed with his musicians friends, Bizu Karmacharya, Roshan Lama and Sujan Rajkarnikar. Stoned Amp signed to Reeyaz Music Records, releasing a debut album self-titled 'Stoned Amp'. In 2009, Yonjan officially announced his departure from Stoned Amp, stating that due to some personal reasons and the band Stond Amp officially disbanded.

=== 2010-2016 ===
Visan N' The Groovers was formed in 2010 by Visan Yonjan after Stoned Amp got disbanded. They released their debut single 'Kaaran' on 14 June 2011 which was a huge hit among the rock fans. The band's second single 'Chaahanna Ma' was released on 24 August 2012 which reached topcharts on the Nepal Mainstream Rock band. They released their third single 'Jiwan ko Paanama' on 5 December 2013; the single marked a change in Visan N' The Groovers's music in a slightly more glam/melo rock influenced direction. On 8 May 2016, Visan N' The Groovers has released their latest single 'Adrishya' from Inline Creation Records. Visan Yonjan has been associated with Inline Creation as Senior Executive Director.

=== 2021 (SaReGaMaPa Li'l Champs Nepal) ===
Visan Yonjan was one of the jury members for the reality show "SaReGaMaPa Li'l Champs Nepal" in Season 1.

=== 2021–Present ===
Visan Yonjan released his new singles 'Dui Thopa Seet', 'Bhulnu Cha' and 'Bhawana Sakaratmak' on 2023 respectively.

== Albums ==
List of Music Albums
Year	Album	Records
2006	Premiere	Reeyaz Records
2008	Stoned Amp	Reeyaz Records
2017	Best of Visan Yonjan	Inline Creation Records

== Singles ==
- 2011 : Kaaran.
- 2012 : Preyesi, Chahanna Ma.
- 2013 : Aama, Jiwan ko Paanama & Adrishya.
- 2023 : Dui Thopa Seet, Bhulnu Cha & Bhawana Sakaratmak.

== Awards ==
List of awards and nominations
Year	Ceremony	Category	Result
2009	11th Annual Tuborg Image Award	Best Band-Stoned Amp	Nominated
2010	Hits FM Music Award	Best Duo/Group	Nominated
2011	12th Annual Tuborg Image Awards	Best Rock Vocal Performance	Nominated
2013	14th Annual Tuborg Image Awards	Best Rock Vocal Performance	Nominated
