= Sushant KC =

Nepali singer-songwriter and music producer

- Born: Sushant KC
- Education: Budhanilkantha School; Rato Bangala School; Berklee College of Music
- Occupations: Singer; Songwriter; Music Producer
- Years active: 2016–present
- Musical career
- Genre: Pop
- Labels: Independent; T-Series

YouTube information
- Channel: Sushant KC
- Years active: 2013–present
- Genre: Music
- Subscribers: 2.58 million
- Views: 778 million

Sushant KC (Nepali: सुसान्त के.सी; born 2 February 1997) is a Nepali singer, songwriter, and music producer.

== Early life and education ==
Sushant KC completed his School Leaving Certificate at Budhanilkantha School, followed by A-Levels at Rato Bangala School. After secondary education, he moved to Sydney, Australia, where he studied business. He later enrolled at the Berklee College of Music in Boston, United States.

== Career ==
Sushant KC began his musical career in 2016. His music style has been described as pop.

In April 2025, he became the first Nepali artist to have a music video featured on the main YouTube channel of T-Series with the Hindi adaptation of his song "Bardali," titled "Uff."

KC has performed in Nepal and internationally.

== Awards and recognition ==
- 2023 Radio Kantipur National Music Awards – People's Choice Award (Best Pop Singer – Male), for the song Risaune Bhaye
- 2024 Radio Kantipur National Music Awards – Best Pop Singer (Male), for the song Sarangi

== Discography ==
=== Singles and EP Tracks ===
Year	Title	Notes	Language
2016	Aama	From the album Blue Figments	Nepali
2016	Kaha Jau	From the album Blue Figments	Nepali
2016	Herda Herdai	From the album Blue Figments	Nepali
2016	All I Ever Dreamed	From the album Blue Figments	Nepali
2016	Falling Apart	From the album Blue Figments	Nepali
2018	Maya Ma	From Maya Ma (2018 Compilation)	Nepali
2018	Timile	From Maya Ma (2018 Compilation)	Nepali
2018	Muskurayera	From Maya Ma (2018 Compilation)	Nepali
2018	Satayera	From Maya Ma (2018 Compilation)	Nepali
2018	Don't Worry	From Maya Ma (2018 Compilation)	Nepali
2018	Behos	From Maya Ma (2018 Compilation)	Nepali
2019	Gulabi	Popular romantic track	Nepali
2019	Phone Ko No.?	Add notes in the empty boxes	Nepali
2019	Rangin		Nepali
2019	Sathi	Breakthrough hit	Nepali
2019	I Like You (Anischaya)		Nepali
2019	Mausam	Featuring Yodda and LIL Rock Look	Nepali
2020	Risaune Bhaye	Fan favorite; acoustic version popular	Nepali
2020	Bhaagera		Nepali
2021	Fakauna Ma		Nepali
2021	Kheladi		Nepali
2021	Timro Maya	Charting single	Nepali
2021	Aasha		Nepali
2021	Dhanyabad		Nepali
2021	Harauna Deu	Featured with Swoopna Suman	Nepali
2022	Risaune Bhaye		Nepali
2022	Yaad		Nepali
2022	Baimani	Emotional theme single	Nepali
2022	Hawa Le		Nepali
2023	Gajalu		Nepali
2023	Sarangi	Award-winning pop single	Nepali
2023	Behos	New Version featuring the Bangers	Nepali
2023	Atteri		Nepali
2023	Jhyal Bata	Noted hit track	Nepali
2024	Parkha Na	Successful solo single	Nepali
2024	Oh Na Na (Nepali Version)	Featured with Karl Wine and Yabesh Thapa	Nepali
2024	Kya Kardiya	Independent Hindi release	Hindi
2024	Plan B		Nepali
2024	Bardali (ft. Indrakala Rai)	Viral collaboration hit	Nepali
2025	Bardali (Acoustic)	Acoustic version of "Bardali"	Nepali
2025	Jhandai		
2025	Pagal	OST for the film “Karma”	
2025	Uff	Hindi adaptation of "Bardali" (T-Series)	Hindi
2025	Pahuna	Featured in charts	Nepali
2025	Thik	Featuring Bluesss	Nepali
2025	Bhayena		Nepali
2025	Tabahi		Nepali
2025	Estai Raicha		Nepali
2025	Uff	Bengali adaptation of "Bardali" sung by Amaresh Dey	Bengali
2026	Ji Chanta Matina		Nepali
2026	Bela Bela	From "Rammita Koo Pirati"	Nepali
2026	Jaadugari		Hindi
2026	Gayo Ta Gayo		Nepali

== See also ==
- Nepali music
- List of Nepali singers
