= Gyanendra Gadal =

Lyrics, songwriter, Nepali poet

Gyanendra Gadal ज्ञानेन्द्र गदाल
- Born: January 17, 1964 (age 61); Illam Nepal
- Origin: Nepal
- Occupation(s): Lyricist, songwriter, poet
- Years active: 1982 (AD) - present

Gyanendra Gadal (Nepali: ज्ञानेन्द्र गदाल ) is a Nepali lyricist, poet, and songwriter. He was born in Fikkal, Ilam, Nepal, and currently resides in Colorado, USA. Gadal is known for his contributions to Nepali literature, particularly in the genres of poetry and ghazals.

With over 125 recorded songs, he has played a significant role in promoting the Nepali language and culture globally, especially within the diaspora. Gadal has received numerous awards for his literary achievements, including the Naftakaji Smriti Rashtriya Sangeet Samman in 2077 BS. His leadership roles in various literary organizations and his extensive body of work highlight his influence in the promotion and preservation of Nepali literature worldwide.

== Songs ==
SN	Song name	Credit	Release date	Vocal	Ref
1	Hirdaya Bhari sajhai dinchhui		2040(BS)	Sambhu Rai/champa Thulunga	
2	Samjhanaka Ghauharu		2042(BS)	Sambhu Rai	
3	Din Dhalyo adheri ratma		2047(AD)	Yashoda parajuli	
4	sagar rahechha maya		2047(AD)	Kuber Rai	
5	Khusi Hunu Sadhai Timi	Lyrics	2020(AD)	Ramkrishna Dhakal	
6	Kalapani	Lyrics	2019(AD)	Yam Baral/ Rita Guragain	
7	Maya Hunchha Bhanana	Lyrics	2023(AD)	Ram Krishna Dhakal	
8	Phul Hau Timi	Lyrics	2023(AD)	Nishan Bhattarai/ Ashmita Adhikari	
9	Masus	Writer and Music	2020(AD)	Anju Panta	

== Honor ==
SN	Honor from	Date (AD)	ref
1	Natikaji Smriti Foundation, Kathmandu	2022	
2	Anesas Bostan Chapter	2018	
3	USA Nepali Literature Foundation	2017	
4	Chhinna Latta Puruskar	2017	
