= Voice of Teen =

Singing reality show in Nepal

Voice of Teen is a singing reality show based in Nepal organized by Super A-One Media Pvt. Ltd. It is a talent hunt between the ages 13 to 19.

== Airing ==
Voice of Teen airs every Friday 9:30 PM (Nepal Time) on Nepal Television.

== Sponsors ==
Season 1 is title sponsored by Hero Honda. Its other supporting partners are

1. Triton International College
2. Meronepalma.com

== Seasons ==
Voice of Teen started in 2009. Rubina Uprety and Bezay Khadka hosted the show.

Season	Year	Winner	Declared
1	2009–2010	Bedu Saru Magar	6 August 2010
