= Voice of Teen season 1 =

Voice of Teen is a singing reality show based in Nepal organized by Super A-One Media Pvt. Ltd. It is a talent hunt for the age group thirteen to nineteen. Season 1 ran in 2009-2010. Voice of Teen - Season 1 has already ended and has already come up with a decision. Bedu Saru Magar is the winner of Season 1.

== Finalists ==
- Bedu Saru Magar (Winner)
- Akanshya Basyal (1st Runner Up)
- Bikesh K Shankar (2nd Runner Up)
- Suraj Poudel (Top 5)
- Enoc Tamang (Top 5)
- Anubhuti Gurung (Top 8)
- Rajkumar Pakhrin (Top 8)
- Samta Rai (Top 8)
- Ashish Das Diyali (Top 12)
- Shristy Hingmang (Top 12)
- Shova Kafle (Top 12)
- Bina Rani (Top 12)

== Jury ==
The Jury for season 1 was composed of the following music professionals from the Nepalese Music Industry.

- Devika Bandana - Singer
- Raju Singh - Music Director
- Ramkrishna Dhakal - Singer

== Airing ==
There were many time changes on airing schedule of Voice of Teen Season 1. However, it was every Friday 9:30 PM (Nepal Time) on Nepal Television during the later episodes.

== Sponsors & partners ==
Voice of Teen Season 1 is title sponsored by Hero Honda. Hero Honda sponsored the title winner with a Hero Honda Glamor Motorbike. Similarly Music Nepal was another major sponsor. The winner was awarded a Music Contract of annual worth NRs. 5 Lakhs by Music Nepal.

Its other supporting partners were

1. Triton International College
2. Meronepalma.com

== Results ==
The final results produced were as follows.

| Name | District | Position |
|---|---|---|
| Bedu Saru Magar | Dang | Title Winner |
| Akanshya Basyal | Butwal | First Runner Up |
| Bikesh K Shankar | Biratnagar | Second Runner Up |
