= Mausami Gurung =

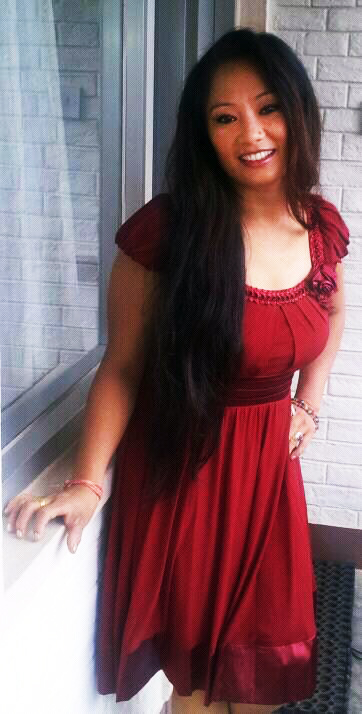

Background information
- Born: 4 March; Kolkata, West Bengal, India
- Occupations: Musician, singer-songwriter
- Instrument: Vocals
- Years active: 2003–present
- Website: www.facebook.com/mausamigurungg

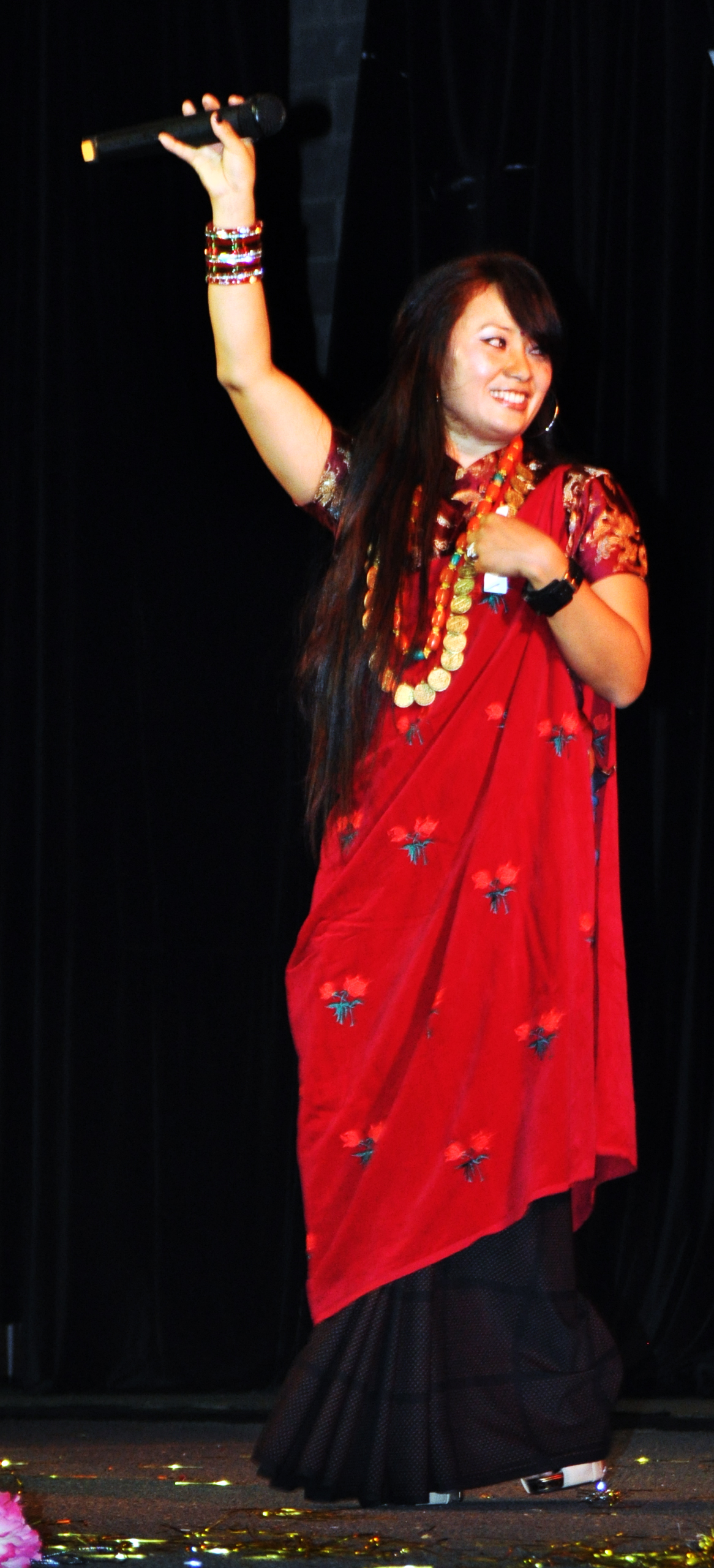
Mausami Gurung performing in Sydney 2011 at Losar, organized by Tamu Samaj

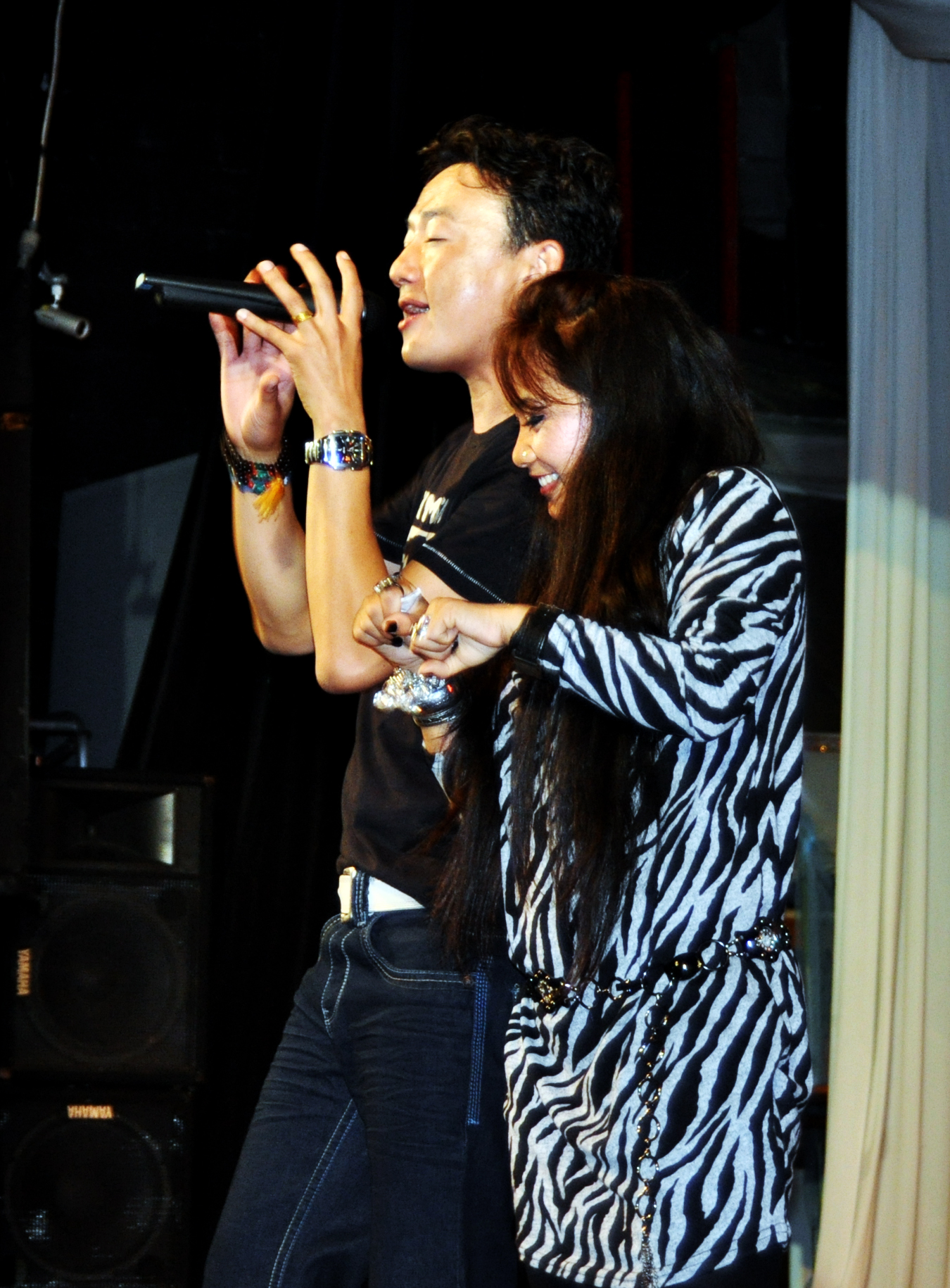
Mausami Gurung and Deepak Limbu performing on stage at Losar event organised by Tamu Samaj Australia in 2011

Mausami Gurung, (Nepali: मौसमी गुरुङ) is a singer and songwriter from Nepal.

== Childhood ==
Gurung is the eldest daughter of Naina Singh Gurung and Chini Maya Gurung-Ciszar. She has two siblings, a brother and a sister. She was a very shy person as a kid. She loved singing since she was a young girl. She participated in various school functions where once she sang Nepali movie song called Sapana Sapana and Yo Karma Bhumiko Aaga with army at Lukhnow, India. Her father is a former Indian Army officer. Whenever he transferred the whole family had to move along with him.

== Education ==
Mausami got the basic knowledge from Dehradun. She also received the education from Centre School, where the kids of Army men were enrolled. She completed her schooling from U.P. Board and also completed her higher education from India as well.

== Career ==
Later on she came to Nepal on 2001 and learnt music for four years and later passed a voice test from Radio Nepal. The main reason of her to come Nepal was to make her citizenship. She have also worked as a teacher in Nepal.

Interested in singing and dancing, she started learning music at Gandharva Sangeet Kala Kendra, at the time she got an opportunity to sing the title song of ‘Deshai Ramailo’ of DB Gurung. She started her music career with the album " Unforgettable" under the banner of Dhaulagiri Cassette in Chaitra 2060. Included the song title Parelimai Chhau Ki Kaso and Mero Maan from the album which introduce her in between Nepali audience and in music field too. She also featured the song Ma Nepali with Nirnaya Shrestha. Her another song "Chayngba Oi Chyangba" featuring The Unity Band (Nepal) a remix number has become very popular. Likewise she gave her melodious voice in "Kanchi Hey Kanchi", "Machi Marana", "Jhumke Phooli" and "Ma Roop Hu" and so on. She have also done playback singing for over 14 movies like ‘Itihas’, ‘Jwalamukhi’, ‘Paley Dai’ and ‘Aagni’ etc. Apart from music field she has also started doing voice overs for different advertisements like Fair & Lovely, Dabur, Rajhans, Pepsodent and Frooti among others. Including Nepal, she perform the live concert in many countries like Belzium, Hong Kong, New York, United Kingdom etc. Her album Mahasus was launched in 2012. Songs such as "Sheetal Sheetal" and "Naya Mausam Cha" received a good response in the market.

== Personal life ==
Mausami is married to Resham Gurung. On 11 March 2014 she was diagnosed with a Brain tumor after complaining of dizziness and headache. Surgery was swiftly proceeded and performed successfully although the tumor wasn't described as life-threatening. The Doctor recommended many months of rest and a hold-off to singing to make a full recovery.

== Awards ==
- Hits FM Music Awards
- Image FM Awards
- Kantipur FM

== Music albums ==
- Unforgettable
- Pal
- Mahasus

== Songs of Mausami Gurung ==
- Chorera Lagyo
- Launa lai Sake Maya
- Aaja Timi
- Ma Nepali
- Parelimai Chhau Ki Kaso
- Machhi Marana
- Ma Roop Hu
- Sital Sital

== Videos ==
- Onlynepali.net
- Youtube.com
