= Uday Sotang =

Nepalese singer

- उदय सोताङ राई
- Born: Tuvkar, Darjeeling, India
- Occupations: Singer, musician
- Spouse: Manila Sotang

Uday Sotang Rai (Nepali: उदय सोताङ राई), credited as Uday Sotang is a Nepali musician and singer. He has written and composed numerous songs, and sung many of them himself. Most of his songs have been rendered by his wife Manila Sotang. He is a coach of Popular Reality show The Voice of Nepal Season 5 and season 6.

== Personal life ==
Uday Sotang is originally from Tukvar, near Darjeeling, India. He moved to Kathmandu to pursue his musical career in 1988. Uday Sotang is married to Manila Sotang who is a Nepali singer. Their daughter Shreya Sotang is an upcoming singer who has already released an album.

== Music ==
With more than 200 songs to his credit, Uday Sotang is considered to be one of the popular and successful Nepali musicians. He is based in Kathmandu, Nepal. The husband-wife duo of Uday and Manila have produced more than 10 music albums. They have produced many albums under the name "U ani Ma" (U standing for Uday, meaning "the other person" in Nepali; and Ma standing for Manila, meaning "me" in Nepali).

== Albums ==
- Jhajhalko
- Darpan
- Muskan
- Katha
- Aatma Katha
- Bhid Dekhi Bahira
- Sandesh
- Marma
- Upama
- Sambaad
- Together (Hindi ghazal album)
