= Kshetra Pratap Adhikary =

Nepali poet, writer and lyricist

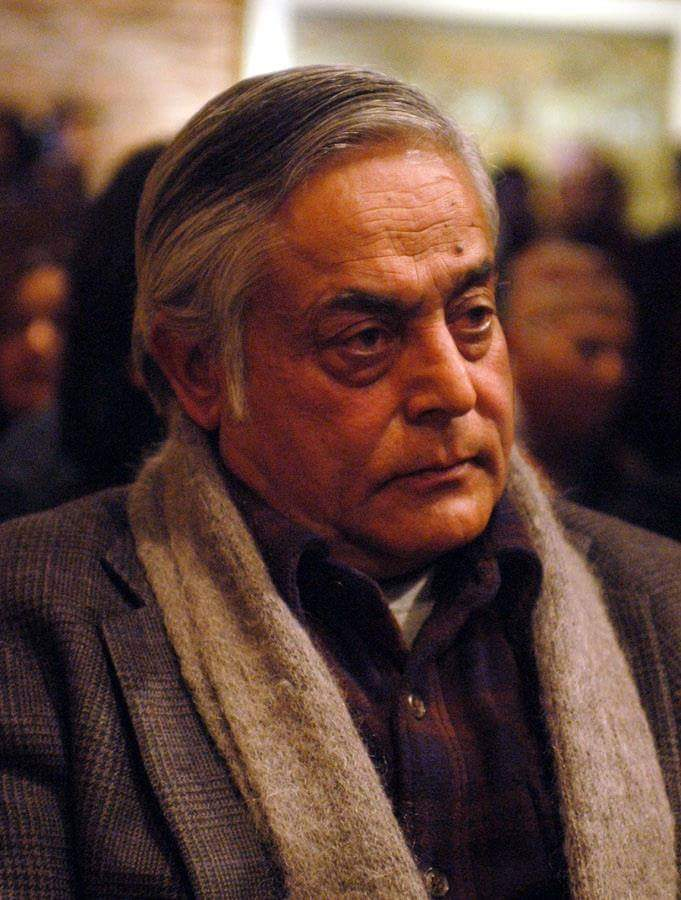
- Portrait of Kshetra Pratap Adhikary
- Born: 1943 (March/April) or in Nepal's B.S. 1999; Jyamruk Bayapani, Mirlung-4, Tanahun, Nepal
- Died: 14 April 2014 or in Nepal’s B.S 2071; Kathmandu, Nepal
- Occupations: Poet, lyricist
- Writing career
- Genres: Poetry, stories
- Notable work: Deputy Education State Minister during the Panchayat regime

Kshetra Pratap Adhikary (Nepali: क्षेत्रप्रताप अधिकारी; 1943 (March/April) – 14 April 2014) was a Nepali poet, writer and lyricist. Adhikari is best known as the lyricist of the song Ma Ta Laligurans Bhayechu by Narayan Gopal. Renowned singers of both the past and present generations, including Narayan Gopal, Bacchu Kailash, Ram Krishna Dhakal, Yogeshwar Amatya, Satya Raj Acharya, Kunti Moktan and Swaroop Raj Acharya have lent their voices to Adhikari's songs. Some of his popular publications are Rahar Lagera, Pahad Dekhi Pahad Samma, Feri Euta Pariwartan, Tara Desh Rahirahecha etc.

== See also ==
- List of Nepalese poets
