= Khimlal Gautam =

Nepalese mountaineer and surveyor

Khim Lal Gautam
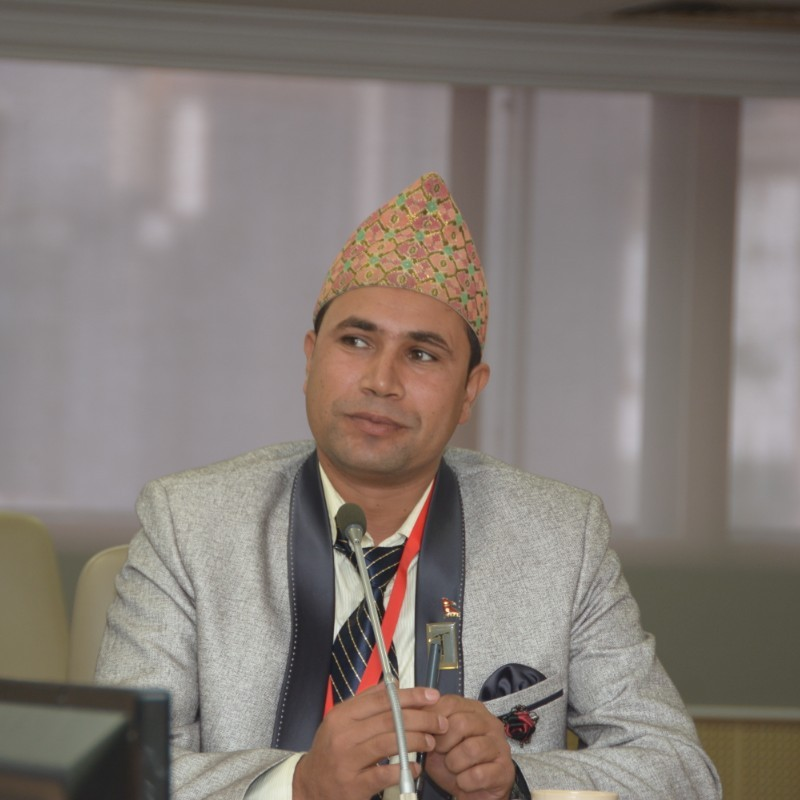
- Khim Lal Gautam in a conference.
- Occupations: Surveyor, civil servant
- Notable work: Pandhrau Chuli (Non-fiction book, 2022)

Khim Lal Gautam (Nepali: खिमलाल गौतम) is a Nepalese mountaineer and Chief Survey Officer in the Survey Department, Government of Nepal. He is the only civil servant and surveyor to have scaled Mount Everest twice. Additionally, he holds the distinction of being the highest-ranking government official from the Nepal government to have summited Everest. Gautam, along with Rabin Karki, was the first surveyor to reach the top of the mountain to measure its actual altitude using state-of-the-art technology. Khimlal also serves as a representative and liaison officer for the Department of Tourism in Nepal.

== Early life and education ==
Gautam was born in Hadaule, a small village in Nepal's Kaski District, where he spent his childhood. Growing up, he was enchanted by the sight of Mt Machapuchhre, just 20 kilometers away from his home, which fueled his love for Nepal's majestic mountains. Despite this, it was Mount Everest that truly captured his imagination, being famous as the tallest peak in the world.

Growing up in Handaule, surrounded by the Himalayas, Gautam developed a deep love for the mountains and a lifelong dream of exploring them. His early experiences in this natural wonderland gave him a strong connection to the Himalayas, which he often credits as the inspiration behind his mountaineering achievements.

Gautam has obtained his master's degree in Geographical Information Science and Systems from the Universität Salzburg.

== First summit ==
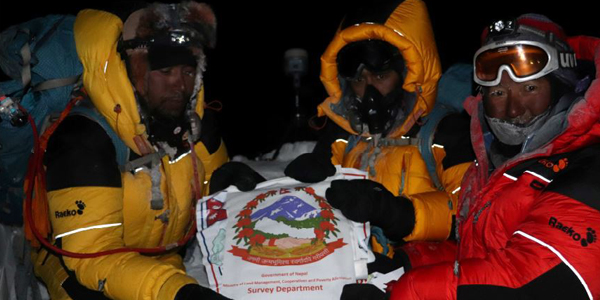
Khimlal on the right, Rabin in the middle, and Tshering on the left.

In 2010, Gorkhapatra daily published an advertisement inviting interested civil servants of Nepal to apply for the inaugural civil servant expedition to summit Mount Everest, as part of the Visit Nepal Year 2011 promotion program. Although initially an alternate candidate, Gautam joined the expedition after a team member withdrew to attend a foreign engagement. On May 18, 2011, they successfully reached the summit at exactly 5:20 am. He was the first among his team to reach the summit.

== Second summit ==
In 2017, following the 2015 Nepal Earthquake, Nepal's Survey Department organized an expedition to Mount Everest to reassess its height. Khim Lal Gautam, chosen as the team leader for his experience and engineering skills, led the expedition. The then Prime Minister of Nepal, KP Oli, bid farewell to the team on April 10, 2019. After extensive preparation and acclimatization at Base Camp over 26 days, the team began their ascent on May 18. However, adverse weather conditions and a shortage of oxygen bottles at the South Col posed challenges. Despite these obstacles, Gautam pressed on, aware that descending would likely result in failure based on his prior Everest experience. On May 22, at 3 a.m., Gautam, along with colleague Rabin Karki and Sherpa, successfully reached the summit of Mount Everest, achieving their mission despite the difficulties faced.

== Book ==
- Pandhraun Chuli (2022)

Pandhrau Chuli is a book that chronicles the author Khim Lal Gautam's experiences and explorations related to Mount Everest. It delves into the emotional and geographical aspects of Everest, Combining personal anecdotes, historical facts, and insights gained from Gautam's two ascents of the mountain. The narrative captures the essence of courage, risk, and struggle encountered during Everest expeditions, while also showing the broader history of Everest exploration. Through Gautam's unique perspective as both a nationalist and a private individual, the book offers readers an understanding of Everest and its significance.

== Role of Gautam in Monitoring Mount Everest's Glacier Changes ==
Gautam has also contributed significantly to monitoring environmental changes on Mount Everest, particularly around the Khumbu Glacier and Everest Base Camp.

=== Observations on Glacier Melt ===
In the spring of 2021, Gautam visited Everest Base Camp and was struck by the unusually loud sound of meltwater flowing beneath the glacier's surface, which he attributed to accelerating glacial melt caused by rising temperatures in the Himalayas.

=== Assessment of Human Impact ===
Gautam documented several human activities that were intensifying the melt:

- Removal of surface debris to set up tents, which allowed more heat and sunlight to penetrate the glacier.
- Extensive use of propane gas at the camp, which he estimated caused the melting of over three million kilograms of ice per climbing season.
- Daily discharge of approximately 4,000 liters of urine onto the glacier, contributing additional thermal load.

=== Policy Recommendations ===
Gautam co-authored a 2022 report for the Government of Nepal recommending the relocation of Everest Base Camp near Gorak Shep. He warned that, without intervention, the Khumbu Glacier could soon be left without any ice due to the combined effects of climate change and human pressure.

=== Peer-Reviewed Study on Human Impact ===
In July 2026, Gautam and co-authors published a peer-reviewed study in Regional Environmental Change quantifying the effects of human activity on the Khumbu Glacier around Everest Base Camp. Based on field measurements from the spring 2023 climbing season, the study estimated that fuel use and human urinary discharge at the camp released enough heat energy to melt roughly 2,500 tons of glacier ice and snow that season. Using Landsat satellite data spanning 1991 to 2023, the authors also found that surface temperatures at Everest Base Camp had warmed at roughly twice the rate of the adjacent glacier surface. The paper identified two alternative sites southwest of the current camp as more geologically stable relocation options.

== Gautam's View: Where Mountains Meet Mythology ==
According to Hindu mythology, Mount Everest was known as Naubandhana, meaning "boat anchor." The name originates from the account in the Matsya Purana and the Mahabharata, which describes a great flood at the end of the sixth Manu era (Chakshusha). During this event, Lord Vishnu, in His Matsya (fish) avatar, guided King Satyavrat (later Vaivasvata Manu) to tie a boat carrying sages and seeds of life to the peak of the tallest mountain to survive the flood. This peak, which remained above the water, was later identified as Everest, or Naubandhana.

The Mahabharata refers to what was considered the highest peak in the world at the time, as lying beyond the Himalayas and still known as Naubandhana, marking it as the resting place of the flood boat. A yellow band (limestone layer) near Everest's summit is interpreted as the line where the boat was tied, according to this legend.

=== Deduction on the Origin and Dating of Mount Everest ===
Gautam, drawing from Vedic cosmology and traditional Hindu timekeeping, calculated that the tying of the boat to Mount Everest occurred approximately 122 million years ago, marking the transition from the sixth to the seventh (Vaivasvata) Manu era.

This mythological timeline differs from geological estimates, which suggest the Himalayas began forming approximately 40–50 million years ago. However, Gautam notes that this discrepancy is not as wide when compared to the Biblical timeline for the Great Flood, which places it only 4,372 years ago.

== See also ==
- Nepal Government
- Sherpa of Nepal
- Geographer
- Leela Mani Paudyal
