= Shyam Dhakal =

Nepalese alpine skier (born 1981)

Shyam Dhakal (Nepali: श्याम ढकाल) (born November 5, 1981) is a Nepalese alpine skier. He participated in the Alpine World Ski Championships 2009 in Val-d'Isère. In the Men's Slalom his time was 2:15.93 making him 68th place. He also participated in the 2010 Winter Olympics as one of the two participants from Nepal.
