= Om Bikram Bista =

Nepali singer, songwriter and composer

- ओमबिक्रम बिष्ट
- Born: 16 February 1955 (age 71)
- Occupations: Singer-songwriter, music composer
- Father: Daulat Bikram Bista

Om Bikram Bista (Note: Nepali: ओमबिक्रम बिष्ट) (born 16 February 1995) is a Nepalese singer musician and composer. He competed in the "All Nepal Music Competition" at the age of 10. He also participated in Melancholy song performed by 365 artists that was recognized by Guinness World Records. The song was written, composed and directed by environmentalist Nipesh Dhaka.

== Discography ==
Songs Bibliography
| Song | Singer | Genre |
|---|---|---|
| 11 12 13 | Sanjay Shrestha Om Bikram Bista | Pop |
| Badanaam Bhai Na | Om Bikram Bista | Aadhunik-Pop |
| Bhooleka Katha | Arun Thapa | Aadhunik |
| Dekhe Sapana | Om Bikram Bista | Aadhunik-Pop |
| Gahro Paryo Launa Jiuna | Om Bikram Bista | Pop |
| Har Saajh | Om Bikram Bista | Aadhunik-Pop |
| Jhyal Bata Herera | Yogeshwar Amatya Om Bikram Bista | Pop |
| Ma Maunta ma | Om Bikram Bista | Aadhunik-Pop |
| Ma Samjhanthe | Om Bikram Bista | Aadhunik-Pop |
| Mero Jindagiko | Om Bikram Bista | Aadhunik-Pop |
| Mero Yaad Ajhai | Om Bikram Bista | Aadhunik-Pop |
| Nabhanideu | Om Bikram Bista | Aadhunik-Pop |
| Pahilo Pahilo | Bimala Rai | Aadhunik |
| Soon Chaandi Bhanda | Sukmit Gurung Om Bikram Bista | Aadhunik-Pop |
