= Tamu Samaj =

Tamu Samaj ("Tamu Society") is a society of Tamus (also known as Gurung), an ethnic group from Nepal. The Tamu societies are created around the world as a means to preserve Tamu's unique culture outside of Nepal. They organise cultural events, such as festivals of dance, music, and food. They also engage in humanitarian, social and educational activities. There are a number of Tamu Samajs around the world, including: Tamu Samaj Sydney, Tamu Samaj Victoria, Tamu Samaj UK, but some inherit different names such as "Gurung Tamu Society".

Tamu Samajs were originally formed to spread a sense of solidarity among Tamus living in Nepal and abroad. They are a central part of the community's social gatherings, activities and events.

== History ==
In 1958, Bernard Pignede, a French student of anthropology came to Nepal to study about Gurungs. He spent seven months in a Gurung village Mohoriya (Kaski, Gandaki) and traveled through many neighboring Gurung villages to do his research. He learned to speak tamu-kuwei (gurung dialect) and documented pretty much everything about the gurungs – their social structure, culture, religion, history, occupations, legends and myths. He translated pae, a ritual and religious practice that one gurung generation has passed down to another for thousands of years. Pae conveys the oral history of gurungs and is considered very sacred. Unfortunately, Pignede died in 1961 at age of 29. After his death, Professor Louis Dumont published Pignedes work in 1966. The book was immediately recognized as a major contribution to the anthropology of the Himalayas. Later, two noted anthropologists – Sarah Harrison and Alan Macfarlane translated it in English and published the first English version in 1993. Harrison and Macfarlane studied further of gurungs and added more to Pignede's work. The English version of this book is called “The Gurungs”, which is probably the most acclaimed research on Gurungs so far.

== Culture ==
The Gurungs are famous for their culture. Various studies today have, however, shown that this division is an imposition from outside, and the Gurungs are divided into various subgroups; and they did not conform to the caste system. In Gurung society Chima holds the main responsibility for managing the village administration and also settles disputes in the village. Rodhighar is among the major identity of the social system of Gurung. Some have called the Rodhighar a house to thread wool, while others have called it a place to settle for the night. The Rodhighar is a good example of cooperation, assistance, better relation and collective spirits among the Gurungs.
