= Sukmit Gurung =

Nepali singer

- Born: Sukmit Ongmu Lepcha; Gangtok, Sikkim
- Genre: Modern music
- Occupation: Singer
- Instrument: Vocal

Sukmit Gurung (born Sukmit Ongmu Lepcha, Nepali: सुकमित गुरुङ) is a Nepalese singer of modern classical Nepali songs and has sung popular Nepali songs such as Priyatam and Relimai in the 1990s and worked as a playback singer in various Nepali cinemas. She has sung more than 400 songs including those with contemporary musicians such as Gopal Yonzon, Ambar Gurung, and Sambhujeet Baskota. She also sang in Newari and Japanese language. She was born in Sikkim, India, but has settled in Nepal.

== Biography ==
Gurung was born in Gangtok, Sikkim. Her childhood name was Sukmit Ongmu Lepcha (Nepali:सुकमित ओङ्मु लेप्चा).Her father Bi Ongmu Lepcha had a job in Indian Army and mother Pasang Chiring Lepcha worked for the Sikkim women police force. She started singing for church from her early age and performed in stage for the first time at the age of 14.

In 1970s, she came to Nepal temporarily with her sister who was working for American Embassy in Nepal. In the visit, she met another musician Prakash Gurung in Kathmandu who encouraged to participate in the voice contest organized by Radio Nepal which was the only radio media in Nepal at that time. She won the contest, which allowed her to work in Nepali music industry permanently as a young female artist.

She debuted in Nepali music in Ambar Gurung's musical play Malati Mangale. Her first recorded musical clips were for advertisement jingles. Her first recorded song was Sunchadi Bhanda Mahango which was a duet with another prominent singer Om Bikram Bista and music was provided by Prakash Gurung. The song that established her in the Nepali music industry was Priyatam which was composed by Deepak Thapa. Another popular song was Relimai which was a duet with Madan Nepal and composed by Subha Bahadur Sunam. She was 28 and pregnant when she sang Relimai. The song was converted in to a music video and is among the early music videos of Nepal. Later, she sang Pal Pal, Dhoka Dieu Timile which were also well received. Her song Pal Pal was reused 15 years later in Nepali film Romeo and Muna

She participated on an International Music Festival representing Nepal on ABU Golden Kite WSF 1990 with her song "Binti A Chari". ABU Golden Kite WSF was similar to Eurovision but mainly with Asian countries participating in it.

Because of her contribution to Nepali music, she was appointed as the assistant music director in Nepal Pragya Prathisthan, a government organization to promote Nepali literature, music, art and culture.

Gurung has sung for charity nationally and internationally, such as in Britain. She also sang for joint venture movies made in Pakistan and Bangladesh as playback singer for films such as Hami ek hou (हामी एक हौं) and Dharti Aakash(धर्ती–आकाश).

In her late carrier, she also sang comical songs Chanchale (Nepali:चञ्चले) and Barabar (बराबर) with Hari Bansa Acharya, which were well received in Nepal. When her vocal cord got infected, she became distant from the stage and singing industry.

She married Balram Gurung in 2045 BS and has three children.

== Albums ==
- Kahin ta Birsanu Timile, it was her debeu album published in 1981 BS
- Palpal
- Timi nai bhana
- Utsav
- Rangeen Lahar
- Trishana
