= Atithi Gautam K. C. =

Nepalese singer

Atithi Gautam K.C.
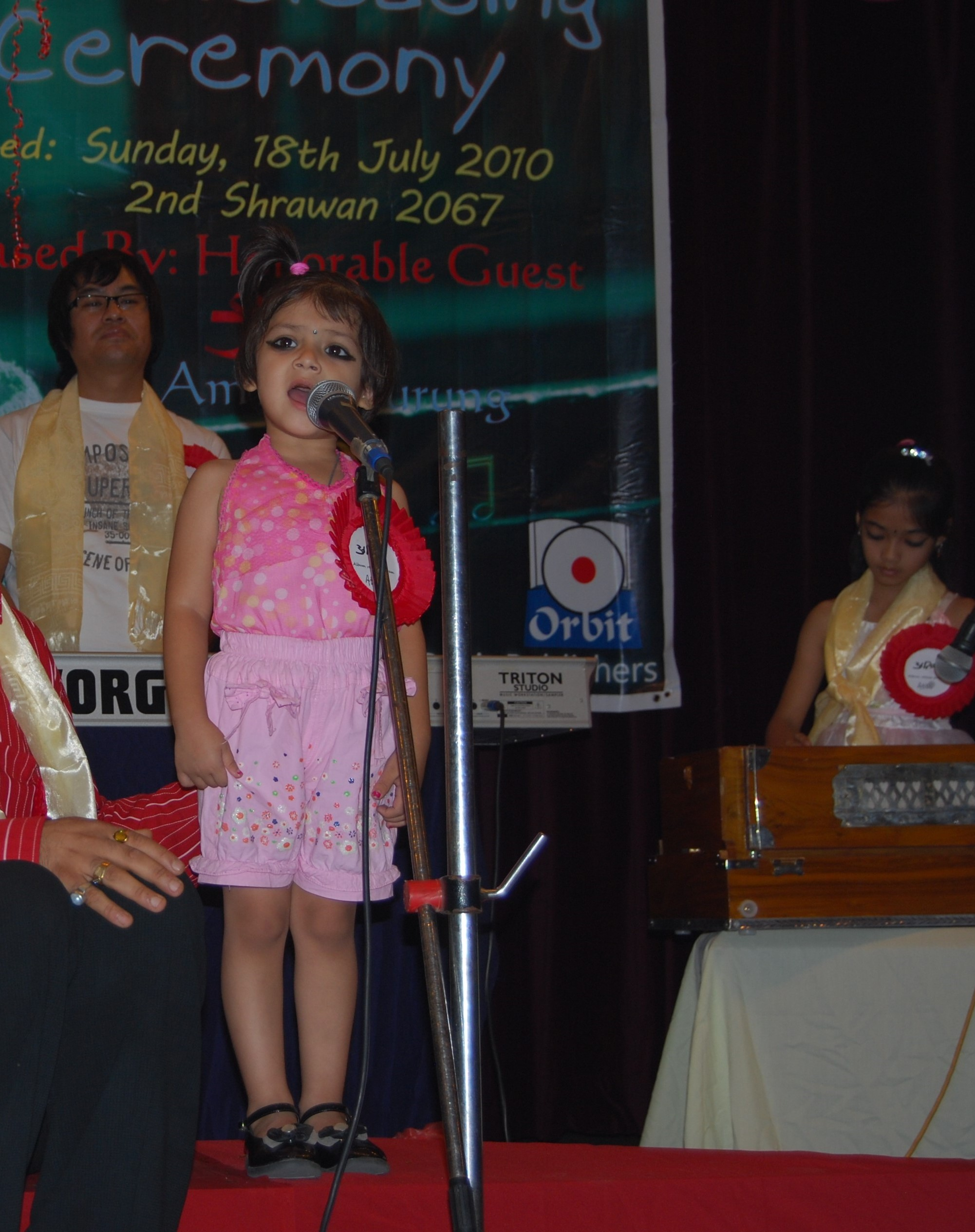
- Atithi performing live during her album release.
- Born: 15 August 2006 (age 20)

Atithi Gautam K. C. (born 15 August 2006, Lalitpur district of Nepal) is known as the youngest singer in the world to release a professional solo album. Atithi's self-titled debut album was released at the age of three on 18 July 2010. The album included nine Nepali-language songs. During the release ceremony for her album, she performed several songs live with Amber Gurung, including the Nepali national anthem.

== Debut album ==
Atithi Gautam K. C. started singing at the age of 20 months, imitating her elder sister Ushna K. C.

She was praised as the youngest singer in the world by the international media in different countries, national and regional languages: China, India, Canada, Pakistan, United Kingdom, United States of America, Japan, Iran, UAE, Malaysia, Estonia, France, Philippines, North Macedonia, Croatia Poland, Kuwait.

== Later albums ==
Atithi's second album Top of the World was released in 2011. To mark its release, it was taken to the peak of Mount Everest by Nepalese civil servant Khimlal Gautam during the nine-person All-Civil Servants Everest Expedition. Top of the World consists of English songs written by Ghanashyam Khadka, with music composed by Joogle Dongol.

Her third album, Gurans and Sakura, was released in December 2016. It served as a celebration of the 60-year diplomatic relationship between Japan and Nepal. This album contains songs in English, Japanese and Nepali.
