= Muna Thapa Magar =

Muna Thapa Magar मुना थापा मगर
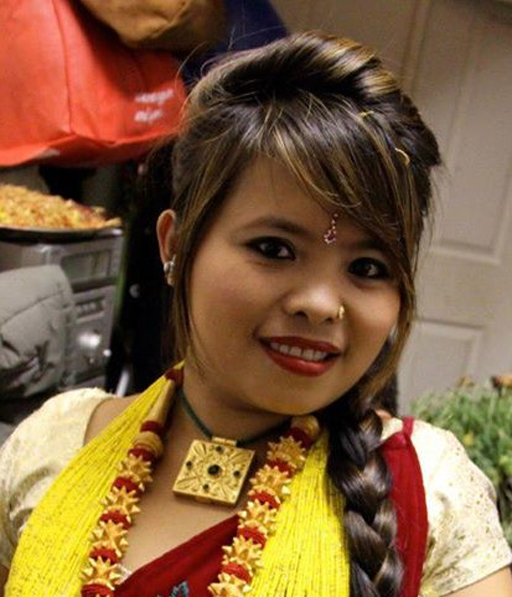

Background information
- Birth name: Muna Magar
- Also known as: Muna Thapa Magar
- Born: 8 August; Manakamana, Gorkha, Nepal
- Genres: Nepali folk
- Occupation: Singer
- Years active: 2003–present
- Labels: Independent
- Website: www.munamagar.com

Muna Thapa Magar (Nepali: मुना थापा मगर) is a Nepali folk singer from Manakamana-9, Gorkha. She was born in the village Siling Lamchhapa, Manakamana Village Development Committee, Gorkha district.

== Career ==
She was brought up in Siling, Lamachap Manakamana Gorkha. Her debut was in Tanahu Aabukhaireni where she went on stage to fill the gap for her friend who could not sing because of a throat problem.

After the Nepal earthquake of April 2015, she contributed relief materials to victims.

== Albums ==
- Teej Git – Beshiko Mela (तिज गीत – बेशिको मेला)
- Chhori (छोरी)
- Doshro Chhori (दोश्रो छोरी)
- Timi Ramro Hasole (तिमी राम्रो हांसोले)
- Badulki Lairahane (Panche Baja) (बाडुल्कि लाईरहने)
- Timi Mero Ma Timro Hune Kahile Ho (तिमी मेरो म तिम्रो हुने कहिले हो)
- Chari Basyo Barako Dalima (चरी बस्यो बरको डालीमा)
- Ke Diu Maile Samjhana (के दिउ मैले सम्झना)
- Piratima Fail (पिरतीमा फेल)
- Jiban Adhuro (जिबन अधुरो)

== Awards ==
Year	Award	Category	Result
2009	Tuborg Image Music Award	Best Dohori Singer	Won
2009	Bindabasini Music Award	Folk Singer of the Year	Won
2010	Hits FM Music Award	Album of the Year	Won
2010	Image Award	Dohori Singer Of the Year	Won
2013	Music Khabar Award	Folk Singer of the Year	Won
2014	Music Khabar music award	Folk singer of the year	Won
2015	Music Khabar Award	Folk Singer of the year	Won
