= Panna Kaji =

Nepalese singer

Panna Kaji Shakya
- पन्ना काजी शाक्य
- Born: December 30, 1931; Ombahal, Kathmandu, Nepal
- Died: January 25, 2017 (aged 85)
- Occupations: Singer; Composer; Songwriter
- Years active: 1945–1985
- Notable work: Tiriri Murali Bajyo Banaima, Naulakhe Tara, Narayana Hari Hari
- Musical career
- Instruments: Vocals; harmonium

Panna Kaji Shakya (Nepali: पन्ना काजी शाक्य; 1931-2017) was a Nepali singer, songwriter, and composer. He is known for classics such as Tiriri Murali Bajyo Banaima and Naulakhe Tara.

== Career ==
Shakya began his musical journey by singing bhajan at a young age. He first sang for Radio Nepal in 1951, and he worked there as a singer until 1985. Over time, he started writing, composing, and performing his own songs, eventually contributing vocals to over 300 Nepali songs.

In his early age, Shakya also used to perform in dramas and theaters.

In addition to his musical career, Shakya was also involved in politics. He was a member of the Nepal Praja Parishad, a political group that opposed the autocratic Rana regime. Due to his involvement, he was arrested in 1962.

== Death ==
Shakya died on January 25, 2017, at the age of 85 from cardiac arrest.

== Awards ==
Year	Award	Category	Ref(s)
2013	Tuborg Image Awards	Life Time Achievement Award	
