= Kishor Gurung =

Kishor Gurung (Nepali: किशोर गुरुङ) is a Nepalese guitarist and ethnomusicologist.

== Biography ==
Kishor Gurung comes from a musical family; the first instrument he played was the tabla drums. When he decided to learn the guitar he faced the difficulty of inaccessibility to printed music, recordings and accredited teachers in his homeland Nepal, but he eventually won a full scholarship to study guitar at the San Francisco Conservatory of Music, where he studied with Larry Almeida, George Sakallariou and David Tanenbaum and participated in Master Classes conducted by such distinguished international guitarists as Michael Lorimor (USA), Julian Bream (UK), Manuel Barrueco (Cuba), David Russell (Scotland), Jose Tomas (Spain), Abel Carlevaro (Paraguay). He pursued then an MA degree in ethnomusicology at the University of Hawaii as an East-West Centre grantee, following which he has participated in international music seminars and performed in Asia and Europe with favorable press reviews. Kishor is the first Nepali to obtain music degrees from the accredited institutions of the West. In addition to his TV appearances and radio broadcasts, Kishor has also appeared as a soloist with the Long Island Youth Orchestra of New York.

Kishor has been an executive member of the state-run Radio Nepal, and has taught at Tribhuvan University and Malpi International College (affiliated with the University of Mississippi, USA) in Kathmandu. During his recent residency in the UK, he taught at various schools for the Harrow Council, London.

As the founder and president of the Classical Guitar Society of Nepal, he organized the first Ethnomusicology Seminar and International Guitar Festivals in Nepal that were attended by luthiers, scholars and guitarists from Germany, Japan, the USA, Finland, Liechtenstein, and Thailand. He has written and produced songs to promote drug abuse awareness among youth for the United Nations and the American Embassy/Kathmandu. He has lectured at Folklore Society Congress, Kathmandu; St. Lawrence University; Society for Ethnomusicology Colorado; Heidelberg University, Germany and in Italy .

With the onset of focal dystonia (a debilitating nerve condition) in 2006, Kishor had to stop giving concerts. In addition to seeking medical attention, he has devised his own therapy and a miniature guitar for shadow practicing. He has almost cured himself and has embarked on playing guitar again. He performed his UK debut in Folkestone, Kent in 2010, for the charity of the Gurkha Memorial Statue.

Kishor has been accorded a commendation from the Government of Nepal for assisting in the making of the new National Anthem (2007).
