= Manila Sotang =

Nepali singer

Manila Sotang (Nepali: मनिला सोताङ) is a Nepali singer.

== Music ==
Manila was trained in music early in life by her uncle who taught her to sing bhajans. After singing playback for the film Mayalu, she was noticed as a singer. Manila has sung more than 200 songs to date. She has 10 music albums with her husband Uday Sotang. The husband-wife musical couple have contributed to Nepali Adhunik (modern) music for two-and-a-half decades.

== Albums ==
- Jhajhalko
- Darpan
- Muskan
- Katha
- Aatma Katha
- Bhid Dekhi Bahira
- Sandesh
- Marma
- Upama
- Sambaad
- Together (Hindi ghazal album)

== Personal life ==
Manila Sotang is originally from Darjeeling, India. She moved to Kathmandu along with her husband Uday Sotang to pursue their musical career in the late 1980s. Her daughter Shreya Sotang is a singer who has also released an album.
