= Kamal Khatri =

Nepali singer

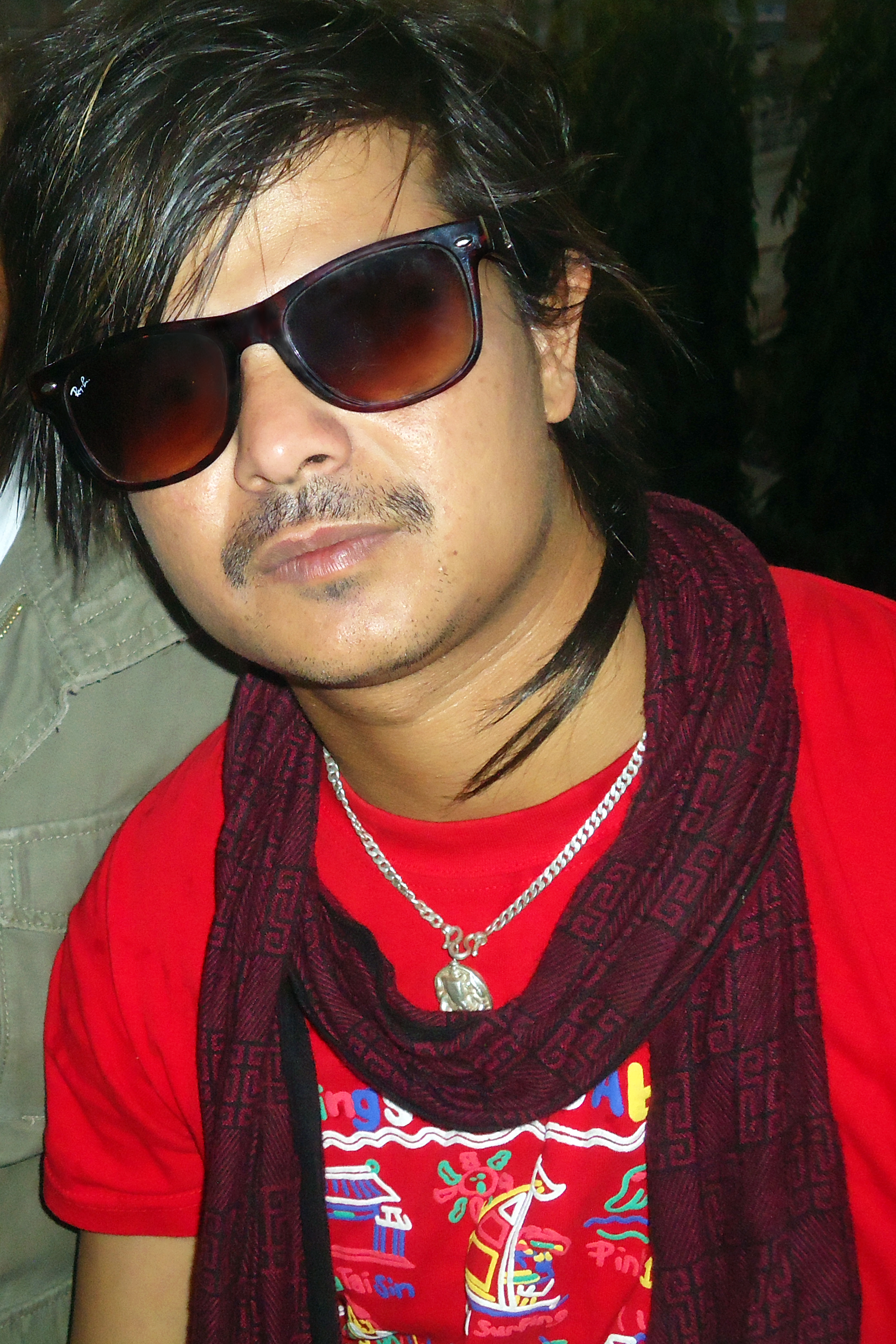
- Khatri in Ncell concert 2013 in Lahan

Background information
- Born: Kamal Khatri; 24 November 1983 (age 41); Hetauda, Nepal
- Genres: Playback singing, folk, modern
- Occupation: Singer
- Years active: 2005–present
- Spouse: Melina Mainali

Kamal Khatri (Nepali: कमल खत्री) is a Nepali singer, songwriter and composer. His career began in the adhunik (modern) song competition on Radio Nepal in 2005. He is known as one of the best adhunik (modern) pop singers of Nepal.

He is currently one of the busiest musicians in the Nepali music industry. His popular songs are "Jaula Relaima", "Aatma ma", "Pahilo Maya" and "Fikka Fikka".

== List of songs by Kamal Khatri ==
Title	Album	Genre	Release date
Ma ta mare (म त मरे)	Pida	Pop	23 November 2011
Aatma ma Timro Aatma ma (आत्मामा तिम्रो आत्मामा)	Aatma Ma	Pop	6 September 2012
Korera prem patra mayalulai (कोरेर प्रेम पत्र)	Imagination	Pop, romantic	22 September 2012
Tero ra mero (तेरो र मेरो)		Pop	27 September 2012
Timilai Chahisake Maile (तिमीलाई चाहिसके मैले)	Prastav	Pop	27 September 2012
Satau Janma Hoina (सातौं जन्म होइन)	Pida	Pop	5 March 2013
Patharko Rahecha Mutu (पत्थरको रहेछ मुटु)	Pida	Pop	9 March 2013
Najik chau timi mero (नजिक छौ तिमी मेरो)		Pop	17 April 2013
Timi chau ra ta (तिमी छौ र त)		Pop	12 May 2013
Tukreko mutu hera (टुक्रेको मुटु हेर)	Atma ma 2	Pop	18 October 2013
