= Mallika Karki =

Nepali singer

Mallika Karki (Nepali: मल्लिका कार्की) is a Nepali singer.

She received the National Boster Music Award (2019). She had previously received Kalika Music Award, Sagarmatha Music Award, Music Khabar Music Award, and Bindabasini Music Award.
