= Koili Devi =

Koili Devi कोइली देवी
- Birth name: Radha Basnet
- Born: September 1929; Chisapani Gadhi, Makwanpur, Nepal
- Died: 2007; Kathmandu, Nepal
- Occupation: Singer

Koili Devi Mathema (c. 1929–2007) was the first woman lyricist as well singer and composer in the Nepali music industry. She is also referred to as 'Cuckoo bird', a title derived from the meaning of her name 'Koili' in Nepali. It is apt with the description of the Cuckoo bird, known for a melodious and sweet voice. With the help of her aunt, she entered into the palace of Singh Sumsher JBR at the age of 11 years, as a helper. He referred to her as Koili after listening to her melodious voice, after which she became known as Koili Devi, the name that gave her success and fame. She used to sing and dance in the Singha Durbar. Around the year 2007 B.S., after the establishment of democracy in the country, she became an independent singer in Radio Nepal. She belongs to the first generation of Nepali singers who became professional singers. Her songs have also been used in several movies and dramas across the country.

== Personal life ==
Koili Devi was originally named Radha Basnet, daughter of Nilam Basnet and Rambahadur Basnet in Chisapani Gadi, Makwanpur District. Although her name was Radha, she was known as Pantari when she was small, and she used the same name for enrolling in a local school in Makkhan tole in Kathmandu. Her mother died when she was only one year old. At the age of five she went to Kathmandu with her aunt (father's sister), who also taught her music. With the help of her aunt, she entered into the palace of Singh Sumsher JBR at the age of 11 years as a helper. He referred to her as koili after listening to her melodious voice, after which she became known as Koili Devi, the name that gave her success and fame.

== Professional life and awards ==
She used to sing and dance in the [Singha Durbar] but around the year 2007 BS, after the establishment of democracy, she became an independent singer in Radio Nepal where had begun her music career. "Sansarko jhamela lagdacha kya yo mela" was her debut song recorded in 1950. She has lent her voice to over 4,000 songs, including modern and patriotic songs and albums like Sewa and Samarpan.

She was awarded with Radio Nepal's Best Musician Award, Subha Rayabhisek Padak, Gorkha Dakshin Bahu V, Chinnalata Music Award, among others. Mathema is also remembered for her lyrics and compositions. She has composed popular songs like "Jahi ra juhi phul mala gansi duwaile launla" and "Jindagi bhari nachuttine gari saino jodaunla".

Koili Devi Mathema died in Kathmandu on 21 December 2007, aged 78.
