= Nalina Chitrakar =

Nepalese singer

- नलिना चित्रकार
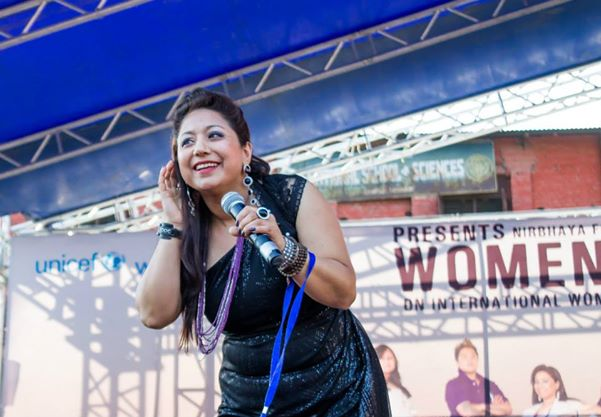
- Nalina Chitrakar Live at Women In Concert 2014
- Education: Padma Kanya Multiple Campus
- Occupation: Singer
- Spouse: Sanjeev Mishra (m. 2003)

Nalina Chitrakar (Nepali: नलिना चित्रकार) is a pop singer from Nepal. She was named the country's best pop singer in 1999 and 2005 and has performed at several events including Miss Nepal and Nepal Idol. She writes songs about the harmony between Madhesi and Pahadi people, and fights against the discrimination of the Madhesi communities of Nepal.

== Early life and education ==
She was born on the day of Indra Jatra as the youngest child in her family. As a child, she wanted to be an airhostess, but that dream was not realized. She was a student of psychology at Padma Kanya Multiple Campus where she was a batch-mate to Princess Shruti Shah. She got a scholarship to Chandigarh University for music study, but she did not join.

== TV career ==
In her early career, she worked for Channel Nepal as a TV host and also acted in commercials. She also interviewed Dipendra Shah.

== Music career ==
Chitrakar started her singing career after her SLC for Ganesh Yuwa Club in Rastriya Sabha Griha, Kathmandu; it was a Newari song. She also worked in Radio Nepal. The first Nepali song was Timro Adhar. Her second songs kina-kina, was a rock flavoured pop song, that was a new trend in Nepali society.

== Award Nomination ==
- Hits FM Music Awards for the song Kina-Kina
- Hits FM Music Awards for the song Pani-pani

== Albums ==
- Creation
- Nalina
- Priyatam
- Selected Nalina
- Jindagi
- Refresh, 2008
- Parelima, 2012
- Sahasle

== Personal life ==
She married Sanjeev Mishra in 2003. They have a son and live in California as of 2020.
