= Khem Raj Gurung =

Nepalese singer (1975–2016)

- खेमराज गुरुङ
- Khem Raj Gurung in Medicare National Hospital and Research Centre, Chabahil
- Born: 14 January 1975; Khandbari
- Died: 25 August 2016 (aged 41); Chabahil
- Occupations: Singer and Song Writer
- Awards: Best folk song for "Alu tama",Fm music award

Khem Raj Gurung was a Nepali musician and singer. Many of his songs such as "Wari Jamuna Pari Jamuna" and "Bhanchan Budapakale" were the biggest chartbusters of their time. He was known for singing traditional and cultural songs which had moral lessons. He was one of the top singers in Nepal during the 1990s and 2000s. He died on August 25, 2016, following a severe liver infection.

Khem Raj Gurung was originally from Khandbari of Sankhuwasabha district and he is considered to be the only national level singer from the Sankhuwasabha district. Gurung had given his voice to a number of folk songs and nine music albums. The most popular songs of Khem Raj Gurung are "Wari Jamuna Pari Jamuna", "Aalu Tama" and "Bhanchan Budapakale". The albums of Khem Raj Gurung are - Jeevan, Jeevan-2, Aanamol, Dharan-Pokhara, Solti, Aalu Tama, Dhakre, Dhakre (Lokgeet), and Ghumphir.
