= Dhiraj Rai =

- Genres: Pop, rock
- Occupations: Singer, musician, songwriter
- Instrument: Vocals
- Years active: 1990–present

Dhiraj Rai (Nepali: धीरज राई) is a singer, musician and songwriter from Khotang, Nepal. Rai's first recorded song is Luki Luki.

== Career ==
Rai started his career in 1990. Generally, his songs are based on love using the conventions of pop and rock. His popular album are Premi, Prithak, Buddha Born in Nepal.

He has sung an unplugged version of his solo song Himal Najhuke Samma.

== Discography ==
=== Albums ===
- Buddha Was Born in Nepal
- Freedom
- Prithak

=== Selected songs ===
Shake It Shake It
Timi Runda
Himal Najhuke Samma
Ki Baachna Deu Lasso
Soy Dhole Soy
Buddha Was Born in Nepal
