= Zascha Moktan =

Zascha Moktan ज़स्चा मोक्तान
- Born: Zascha Moktan; 23 December 1981 (age 44); New Delhi, India
- Genres: Pop, soul, funk, blues
- Occupations: Singer-songwriter, pianist
- Instruments: Vocals, piano, guitar
- Years active: mid-1990s
- Labels: Urban Records, Universal Music Group
- Website: www.zascha-moktan.de

Zascha Moktan (Nepali: ज़स्चा मोक्तान; born 23 December 1981) is a Nepalese-German singer, pianist and guitarist.

== Career ==
Born in New Delhi, India to a Nepalese father and a German mother, Moktan moved to Germany at the age of six. She moved from India via London – where she had her first music performances in a gospel choir — to Frankfurt, Germany, then to Berlin. She started playing the piano when she was eight years old, and she later joined her school's choir where she completed training in classical music. In the mid-1990s Moktan founded a band along with friends in Frankfurt, who initially played punk and rock music. In 2000, she participated in a song contest where she won the title of Best Hessian Newcomer Band. At another contest she was discovered by Nigel Kennedy, who invited her to join him at some of his performances.

In November 2003, Moktan performed as a supporting act for Craig David at the German leg of his tour. In 2005, she went on tour in the U.S. with Alicia Keys and John Legend. Because of that she interrupted her training as a hair stylist, which she had just started in Hamburg. After returning home she signed her first record deal in 2006 with Universal Music Group. Until then people complained that her music sounded too American for the German market. After her success in the U.S., she released her debut single "Ouch!" on 9 November 2007. In September 2007, she was named the Newcomer of the Month by Munich-based radio station Bayern 3. Additionally, she performed at the New Pop Festival in Baden-Baden, Germany.

Moktan's second single, entitled "Like U Do", was released on 14 March 2008, as was her debut album, The Bottom Line.

Her music combines elements of soul, funk, jazz, blues, and gospel.

== Discography ==
=== Singles ===
- "Ouch!" (2007) No. 36 Germany Singles Top 100
- "Like U Do" (2008) No. 76 Germany Singles Top 100
- "Strangers" (2011)
- "Shame, Shame, Shame" (feat. Ce-Lo Green) (2011)

=== Albums ===
- The Bottom Line (2008) No. 38 Germany Albums Top 100
- State of Mind (2011)

== Awards and achievements ==
- 2000: Beste deutsche Hessische Newcomer Band
- 2007: Bayern 3-Newcomer des Monats (September)
