= Bacchu Kailash =

Bachchu Kailash बच्चु कैलाश
- Born: Kailash Bahadur Basnet; 30 July 1938; Sapatel, Chhorambu, Khotang district, Nepal
- Genres: Modern music
- Occupations: Singer, lyricist, composer, playwright, editor
- Instrument: Vocalist

Kailash Bahadur Basnet, better known as Bachchu Kailash (Nepali: बच्चु कैलाश) (born 30 July 1938) is a singer, composer and lyricist of Nepali Music. He displayed virtuoso with his songwriting skills in which his lyrics often provoked a subject from a different perspective and highly poetic form; adding with his unique tenor voice made him highly popular.

== Early life ==
Basnet was born on Shawan 15, 1995 B.S (30 July 1938) in Sapatel, Chhorumbu VDC, Khotang. He was the oldest of six brothers born to Karna Bahadur Basnet and Krishna Kumari Basnet. On the 13th day, his mother died and his father Karna Bahadur Basnet remarried.

By the time he was five years old, he was already deep into music. Music used to cheer him up but his maternal aunt and uncle and other relatives never appreciated it. Nevertheless, he persisted in his musical pursuits.

== Career ==
As a young teenager, he was extremely popular among friends due to his singing and later while studying in eight grade, he went to Radio Nepal and sang "Nirash Nahou Sathi, Aansu Aansumai Dubeko Chha Jiwan, Nadarau Sathi" (composed and written by him). At that time Radio Nepal was the only medium from which new singing talents were exposed to a wider audience and singing would have to be done live on air. His performance that day became popular among the public and virtuoso Master Ratna Das Prakash, after listening to the song, became a fan and started looking for him. They later met and Master Ratna who regarded highly of him helped him in understanding the industry then.

He sang many memorable songs like "Kalpanako Gagan Muskuraune Chandra Banana", music composed by himself and lyrics by Surendra Shah, "Tadha Tadha Janu Chha Sathi Ekpher Hansideu", music composed and lyrics by himself, " Juneli Ratma Dil Kholi Dohori Gauna Man Lagyo", music composed by himself and lyrics by Lakshman Lohoni, "Yo Ho Geet Timilai, Yo Ho Preet Timilai", music composed by himself and lyrics by Shanti Shah, "Tyo Aankhale Lau Na Malai Maryo, Tyo Bolile Lau Na Lato Paryo", music composed and lyrics by himself, "Birseko Bhaye Biteka Kura Papiko Manle" music composed by himself and lyrics by M.B.B.Shah, "Timile Ta Haina Timra Bhakaharule Mero Mutu Chhoisakechhann", music composed by Natikaji, and lyrics by Kshetra Pratap Adhikary, "Larke Joban Gayena Maya Nalai Bhayena", duet folk song with Pushpa Nepali and Music composed and lyrics (Collected?) by Pushpa Nepali.

He excelled in music and was equally a good music teacher. He has taught music to poet M.B.B Shah and composer G Shah among others. There was a period when learning and performing music was not considered a good vocation. However, he continued in his endeavor. During that time, he also used to perform at the rangamanch.

Nepali people around the world adore his voice and songs. He is among the few singers who wrote songs and composed his own music. He devoted his life to singing Nepali songs for about 15 years and his popularity remains undiminished.

He has also collaborated with Ruby Joshi.

== Partnership with Pushpa Nepali ==
Most of the duet songs with male singer, Bachchu Kailash has sung with Pushpa Nepali like "Titari Pankhi Ni Badalu Mathi Sunaulo Sanjhama", "Samjhanako Dharle Kalpanako Chhatima", "Larke Joban Gayena Maya Nalai Bhaena", "Bho Bho Narou Juneli Chari, Hamro Palo Aaai Pugchha Aba Ta".

== Personal life ==
Basnet has been married twice and he is a father of two children. These days, he is leading a happy and contented life away from the limelight. He still prefers leading an isolated life. He does not speak much. He leads a peaceful life.

== Discography ==
- Kalpanako Gagan Muskuraune Chandra Banana
- Timile ta haina timra aankha harule
- Tadha Tadha Janu Chha Sathi Ekpher Hansideu
- Tyo Aankhale Launa Malai Maryo, Tyo Bolile Lau Na Lato Paryo
- Kasari Tukri Gai Gayen Yo Kura Binti Nabhana
- Ma Phool Haina Manis Bhai Biraha Boldachhu
- Hridaya Bhariko Mero, Shubhakamana Timilai
- Hanskhel Garda Basechha Dil, Samjhaune Kasari
- Bipanika Sara Katha, Sapanima Aai Rolan
- Bho BHo Narou Juneli Chari Hamro Palo Aaaipugyo Aba ta
- Akash Bat Ma Udi, Aaune Thiyen Nabhuli, Timile Malai Preeti Diye, Ek Pher Matra Daki Diye
- Hridyama Bata Hunchhan, Tyahin Pani Bhet Hunchha
- Phool Tiper Mayako, Chadhaundaichhu Mayalulai
