= Bhumika Giri =

Nepalese folk singer

Bhumika Giri भूमिका गिरी
- Born: Dang, Nepal
- Origin: Nepal
- Genres: Folk; Classical
- Occupation: Singer

Bhumika Giri is a Nepalese folk singer. She is popularly known as Stage Queen because of her stage performances. As of July 2016, Giri has recorded over 300 songs.

== Early life ==
Giri was born in Dang to parents Hemraj Giri and Anju Giri.

== Career ==
Bhumika Giri who is popular for stage performances, has performed in UK and other several countries. She made her first stage performance in Qatar.

== Discography ==
- Lauka Chakhne Mauka Deu
- Teejle Garayo (2015)
- Gorakhpurko Salai (2017)
- Diyeu Churot (2017)
- Mayakai Piralo (2018)
- Tara Sangai Jun (2018)
- Bikriti (2018)
- Basaiko Tama
- Aajai Bhagi Jam (2019)

== Awards ==
- 2017: Sundaradevi Sandesh Music Award
- 2017: Himalayan International Nepali Music Award - Best classical singer
- 2018: Rapti Music Award
- 2018: Kalika Music Award
- 2019: Himalayan International Music Award
