= Phatteman Rajbhandari =

Nepali musician

- फत्तेमान राजभण्डारी
- Born: November 28, 1936; Kathmandu, Nepal
- Died: 9 September 2013 (aged 76); Kathmandu, Nepal
- Awards: Sujbharajyabhisek Padak, Chinnalata Giti Puraskar, Prabal Gorkha Dakshin Bahu, Birendra Aishwarya Sewa Padak, Shambhu Prasad Mishra Smriti Award, Gaddhi Arohan Rajat Mahotsab Padak, Image Lifetime Achievement Award, Bhupalman Singh Sangeet Puraskar

Phatteman Rajbhandari (November 28, 1936 – September 9, 2013), an iconic voice in Nepali music, was a popular vocalist and musician of Nepal known for prominent songs such as "Marna Baru Garho Hunna", "Banai Khayo Dadelo Ley", "Yesto Pani Hudo Raichha", "Sannani ko Galai Ma" and "Rato Ra Chandra".

== Early career ==
Based on published interview:

Phatteman Raj bhandari was born as the third child to his parents Purna Maya Rajbhandari and Jeetman Rajbhandari, a tabla player. He started his study at Durbar High School where he studied for 2–3 months but later joined Padmodaya High School. He however could not pursue higher education due to family circumstances.

He started singing "Bhajans" at a young age along with some acting. After Radio Nepal was established in 1951, Phatteman got a rare opportunity to reveal his talents. He started out by singing a bhajan “Hey Ram Naam Prabhu Ko Japdai Pran Yo Jaaos”. He then sang "Yesto Pani hudo Raicha" in 1968, composed by his childhood friend, Natikaji that brought him instant recognition. In 2017 BS, Guru Das Gokhle [reference reqd] visited Nepal and Phatteman got an opportunity to train on techniques of music. He further joined Sangeet Natak Akademi in 2019 BS and was instructed by Prof. Ram Prasad in Sastriya Sangeet for 4 years.

== Legacy ==
Phatteman is considered as a pioneer in Nepali classical music and was a highly regarded singer alongside famous singers of Nepal like Narayan Gopal, Natikaji and Prem Dhoj Pradhan. In fact, Narayan Gopal was said to be a major admirer of the singer, an admiration that resulted in Gopal's composing three of Rajbhandari's songs—Banai Khayo Dadelo Ley, Nachinejhai and Jindagiko Pana Bhari.

Phatteman's one and only album "Phatteman at 70" composed by Aavaas during a 'Paleti' series was released when he was 70 years old and speaks to his nature as described by music critic Raman Ghimire. “It was all thanks not just to his skillful vocals, but also to a very affable nature, the kind that wasn’t looking to constantly hog the spotlight.”

He has performed in more than 400 classical songs either with vocal or with musical performance. Some of his popular songs include:

- Marna baru garo hunna
- Yesto pani hudo raichha jindagimaa kahile kahile
- Sannaniko galaimaa kalo kothi raichh
- Banai khayo dadelole, mania khayo
- Rato ra Chandra Surya

== Awards ==
Phatteman's contribution to Nepali music has been acknowledged with several accolades during his lifetime:

- Sujbharajyabhisek Padak in 2039 BS.
- Chinnalata Giti Puraskar in 2052 BS.
- Prabal Gorkha Dakshin Bahu in 2055 BS.
- Birendra Aishwarya Sewa Padak in 2058 BS.
- Shambhu Prasad Mishra Smriti Award in 2059 BS.
- Gaddhi Arohan Rajat Mahotsab Padak in 2059 BS.
- Image Lifetime Achievement Award in 2060 BS.
- Bhupalman Singh Sangeet Puraskar in 2061 BS

== Death ==
Phatteman died on Sept 9, 2013 after his struggle with lung cancer along with age related complications. He was reportedly receiving chemotherapy at Om Hospital, Chahabahil.

He is survived by his wife, two sons and three daughter.
