= Parivesh =

Parivesh तिलक बम मल्ल
- Born: Tilak Bam Malla
- Origin: Galkot, Baglung district Nepal
- Genres: Pop, folk pop, Nepali
- Occupations: Singer; Songwriter; Musician
- Years active: 1995–present
- Labels: Parivesh Recording Studio Pvt. Ltd.
- Website: facebook.com/pariveshband

Tilak Bam Malla (Nepali: तिलक बम मल्ल), better known by his stage name Parivesh (Nepali: परिवेश), is a Nepali folk pop singer. He first gained popularity in the late 90s for his second Lok Pop album Parivesh Vol.2 with all-time hit songs like Mutu Chune, Bhote Talcha, Haat Ma Rumal and Chaite Dashain, and was dubbed as pioneer of Lok Pop genre in Nepalese music industry.

Pioneer of folk pop music in Nepal, from Pokhara, family of Martyr Thir Bam Malla, has sung dozens of hit Nepali pop songs and those songs are still playing in Nepali youth's heart. As a member of martyr family, nobody in his family had interest in music, singing or dancing, but as a contrary to this environment, Tilak Bam Malla had a keen interest in music, which grew with his age. Though there was no apparent career opportunity in music industry, during that time, he decided to step in and followed his passion in music.

In addition to acting, Malla is a humanitarian and has participated and spoken out for various social causes, especially during devastating earthquake of Nepal in 2015 and aftermath. He was also awarded by various honors and awards for contributing in the field of social work and welfare acts.

== Singing career ==
Malla is an owner of music "Parivesh recording studio". Remembering the problems he faced in past, today he opts to seek and support talented and passionate music lovers who wants to revolutionize Nepali music industry.

=== Early career in the mid 1990s ===
Tilak Bam Malla had interest in singing from his childhood and used to sing in school's programs without telling his family. When he turned 18, he had been thinking to record an album. With this aim, he went to Radio Nepal for voice test and passed it. After passing voice test from Radio Nepal he started singing contemporary popular songs and folk and in 1996 he sang his first song Yo Baadal Yo Barsha. His first song was a hit in the market. As a versatile singer of Pop, Modern, Folk he decided to sing only Folk-Pop songs which was fusion of Folk and Pop song. He founded a musical band name Parivesh with local group from Pokhara and released his first solo album Parivesh Vol. 1 in late 1990s.

=== Late 1990s to 2000s ===
As a starting trend of western pop music, listeners didn't like his first release and he lost 70,000 rupees, which he had borrowed from his mother. But his song "Chaite Dashain" received good comments from listeners and he planned to sing like folk-pop songs. After a few years of his first release again he borrowed 80,000 Nrs. from his mother and he released his second album "Parivesh Vol. 2" with folk-pop music. As a founder band of releasing folk-pop in Nepal his second release made largest hit and rose him as famous folk-pop singer in Nepal. All-time hit songs like "Mutu Chune lumleko Hawale", "Taxi Gudyo Sarara", "Himchuli Ko Kakhaima" and "Salaijo" songs beat the Nepali music market where "Parivesh Vol. 2" album was sold more than 265,000 copies in a first releasing year and created a record of largest selling album at that time. The artist himself mention that era as 'Golden Time' for his singing career.

=== 2010s to present ===
Parivesh hadn't released any album after his second hit till 2010. He started to prepare for his other album "Parivesh Vol. 8" from early 2010s. This album also will include folk-pop songs and few of songs he have already released and still on process to complete his upcoming album. He is now engaged with his own recording studio "Parivesh Digital Recording Studio Pvt. Ltd." Beside his studio job, he is attending in several "Mahotsav" and Concerts in Nepal and Overseas countries.

== Humanitarian Causes ==
Tilak Bam Malla has been involved in many social works. Malla is very responsible person with responsibilities toward his society and country along with his singing profession. Malla, who has singing career of almost 2 decades, notable for his active participation to help the earthquake victims of Nepal, children affected from the civil war. He was awarded with Yuvaratna Gayan Award for his remarkable contribution of raising the fund amount of 4.3 million rupees in Pradhanmantri Rahat Kosh by conducting the stage shows in Nepal and abroad, in order to help the earthquake victims.

== Awards ==
List of awards and nominations
| Year | Award | Category |
|---|---|---|
| 2016 | Yuvaratna Gayan Award | Best Singer |
| 2016 | Music Khabar Award | Best Singer |
