= Devika Bandana =

Nepalese solo and playback singer

Devika Bandana देविका वन्दना
- Born: December 17, 1969
- Origin: Pashupatinagar, Ilam, Nepal
- Genres: Nepalese Modern Songs, Playback
- Website: www.devikabandana.com

Devika Bandana is a Nepalese solo and playback singer. She has received national level awards including Gorkha Dakshin Bahu and Chinnalata Geet Purashkar. She also participated the song Melancholy, a song by 365 Nepali Artists which was recorded in a single day on 19 May 2016, in Radio Nepal, Kathmandu in which song was attempt to break the Guinness World Records, has been written, music composed and directed by environmentalist Nipesh Dhaka.

== Awards ==
Year (B.S.)	Award	Description
2045	Award from Shree Mahendra Prakriti Samrachyan Kosh	
2046	Ratna Recording	
2046	Ratna Shree Samman	for Lok Gaayan
2046	Award received from Shahi Nepal Sena	
2049	Award received from Kaanti Bal Hospital	
2050	Chinnalata Geet Purashkar	
2053	National Vision B.G award	
2053	Shree 5 Birendra Gaddi Aarohan Rajat Mahotsav	
2053	Kollywood Cine award	
2053	Abhiyaan Shree Award	
2054	Kollywood Cine award	
2055	Kollywood Cine Award	
2055	Award from Sagarmatha Shahitik Prathisthan	
2056	Kollywood Cine Award	
2056	Appreciation Certificate from Nepal film Development Company	For the movie - Maili
2057	Certificate for reaching 100 days of thul dai	
2057	Award from New Century Film Pvt Ltd	
2057	Award from International Youth	
2057	Award from Mann Sarobar Cine	
2057	Gold Medal from Adhuniik Gyan(French culture) Jaycees	
2057	San Miguel Music award	
2057	Kollywood Cine Award	
2058	Award from Nepal youth	
2058	Nepal Motion Picture Award	
2058	Gorkha Dakshin Bahuu	
2058	Shree 5 Birendra Aiswarya Sewa Medal	
2059	Award from Bhanubhakta Bhakta Mermorial Ma Vi	
2059	Award from Kantipur FM pvt ltd	
2059	Award from Bhasu Film pvt ltd	
2060	6th Image Award	
2060	Award from international music day 1988	
2063	Award from Sangit Sheela Pratisthan	
2063	Award from Koili Deci Sangeet	
2006	Award from Eurasia Reukai	
2064	Award from Nepal Cinema Prabidhik Sangh	
2064	Chinnalta Geet Puraskar Guthi Rajat Jayanti Mahotsav	
2064	Certify from National Citizen Society	
2065	Star FM Samman	
2065	Nepal Artist Association Samman	
2065	London Guthi Samman	
2065	MRDF samman Nepal	

== Appearances on television ==
- As a Judge on Hero Honda Voice of Teen Season 1 (2006)
