= Nati Kaji =

Nepali singer and songwriter

- नातिकाजी
- Born: Amrit Lal Shrestha; 25 December 1925; Lalitpur District, Nepal
- Died: 2 November 2003 (aged 77); Kathmandu, Nepal
- Citizenship: Nepali
- Spouse: Saraswati Raj Bhandari (m.?-2003 his death)
- Parents: Mohan Lal Shrestha (father); Champa Devi Shrestha (mother)

Amrit Lal Shrestha (25 December 1925 – 2 November 2003), better known as Nati Kaji (Nepali: नातिकाजी), was a Nepalese singer, musician, and songwriter. He was one of the most prominent music directors and singers of his time having composed and sung many evergreen songs including Nepali Hami written by Madhav Prasad Ghimire.

== Early life ==
Amrit Lal Shrestha received his nickname "Nati Kaji" from his grandparents, which later became the name by which he was known throughout the country. He was born in 1925 at Pulchowk, Lalitpur. He lost his mother at the age of five and his father at the age of ten. After that, he was raised by his grandparents at Gujeshwori where his grandfather was the temple priest.

== Career ==
Nati Kaji commenced his musical venture at the age of seven, after he started playing the harmonium at the Gujeshwori Bhajan Mandali. His professional music career initiated when he joined Radio Nepal in 1950. During the 40 years of his service in Radio Nepal, he composed over 2000 songs of varied genres. He is credited for over 15 operas, such as Pijada ko Suga, Kunjani, Prithvi Narayan Shah ka Char Pakchhya. Marna Baru Garho Hunna, an evergreen song penned by Tirtha Raj Tuladhar, sung by Phatteman Rajbhandari remains one of his best compositions.

== Recognition ==
Amrit Lal Shrestha received several prestigious awards for his contribution to Nepali music. His honors include the Gorkha Dakshin Bahu (Pratham), Indra Rajya Laxmi Pragya Puraskar, Chinnalata Geet Puraskar, and Bhupal Sangeet Puraskar, among others.

== Filmography ==
Year	Film	Role	Note
1974	Man Ko Bandh		Music Director
1980	Sindoor		Music Director
1989	Pachhis Basanta		Music Director / Background Music
1989	Shanti-Dip		Music Director
