= Nirnaya Shrestha =

Nepalese Rapper

Nirnaya Shrestha (Nepali: निर्णय श्रेष्ठ), known professionally as Nirnaya Da' NSK, is a Nepalese rapper and songwriter. NSK stands for "Naughty Soul Kid"

== Career ==
He and his team hold the record for "most scholarship distributed in the least time" which has been certified by the World Book of Records, london. He also participated in Melancholy as a rapper, an environmental song by 365 Nepalese artists which was written, composed, and directed by environmentalist Nipesh DHAKA. This song has been certified by Guinness World Records entitled "Most Vocal Solos in a Song Recording".
