= Bartika Eam Rai =

Nepalese-American singer, songwriter, and a poet

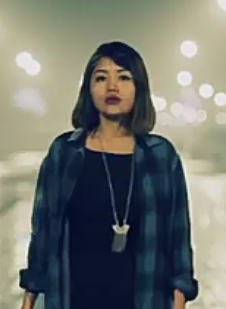

Background information
- Genres: Pop; indie; folk
- Occupations: Singer; songwriter
- Instruments: Vocals; piano
- Years active: 2016–present
- Partner: Yugal Gurung
- Website: Official YouTube channel

Bartika Eam Rai (Nepali: बर्तिका एम राई) is a Nepalese born-American singer-songwriter based in New York City.

In 2016, Rai burst onto public consciousness with the release of her debut album, Bimbaakash. Rai has released four albums so far.

== Musical career ==
Bartika grew up in Lalitpur, Nepal and pursued music informally from the age of six. At around 11 years of age, she was already performing in front of small crowds. She recorded a number of children's songs and was trained by Shreeti Pradhan, Upendra Lal Singh, Roshan Sharma, John Shrestha and Gurudev Kaamat.

It was only after moving to the United States that she began to pursue music professionally as a career. After moving to New York City in 2015, Rai began to work with Nepali-American musician Diwas Gurung, previously of the Ithaca-based progressive rock outfit, Ayurveda. In 2015, they began working on what would become Bimbaakash, a six-song EP, with Rai writing and composing the songs while Gurung produced.

Rai released her first single, Khai, on YouTube in January 2016 to widespread popularity. A review in The Kathmandu Post called the song a "breath of fresh air" and praised the "thrilling aesthetics of its poetry and the simplicity of its delivery".

Rai was nominated for Best New Artist, Song of the Year (for Khai), Best Pop Vocal Performance (Female) (for Khai) and Album of the Year (for Bimbaakash) at the Hits FM Music Awards. She won Song of the Year and Best Pop Vocal Performance (Female).

In March 2018, Rai announced the release of her second album, Taral, once again produced by Gurung. The album was supported by tours across the United States and England and the release of a music video for its first single, Umer.
