= Prakash Gurung =

Prakash Gurung is musician and singer of Nepalese music. He got inspired by his friends in his early childhood to enter into creating music. He was born and raised in Darjeeling, the place where he got chance to learn music from prominent musician of the time such as Amber Gurung, Gopal Yonzon, Karma Yonzon, and Nati Kazi. In addition, he used to assist Narayan Gopal while performing in Darjeeling.

Songs Bibliography
Song	Singer	Genre
Binti Chha Hai	Prakash Gurung	Aadhunik
Chori Deu Chori Deu	Udit Narayan; Kavita Krishnamurthy	Movie
Ma Samjhanthe	Om Bikram Bista	Aadhunik-Pop
Soon Chaandi Bhanda	Sukmit Gurung; Om Bikram Bista	
