= Bednidhi Poudel =

Nepali singer and musician (born 1973)

- Born: Bednidhi Poudel; 25 June 1973 (age 53); Jeetpur, Dhankuta, Nepal
- Genres: Classical music Ghazal singing
- Occupations: Singer, composer
- Instruments: Vocals, harmonium
- Years active: 1993–present

Bednidhi Poudel (born 12 March 1973) is a Nepali singer and musician. He is known for his composition having spiritual essence with the blended flavor of eastern classical and western music.

== Musical career ==
Bednidhi Poudel's affection with music began at a very tender age in Itahari. He got his talent crafted further under various maestros such as Gopalnath Yogi, Bhola Rai, and Kusheswor Rai, Poudel has also obtained diploma in music from Sur Sangam Bidhyalaya of Allahabad in India.

Poudel, an ardent fan of Narayan Gopal and Mehdi Hassan released his first album Chhadke Nazar in 1999. The album consists of Aaja Yo Andhyarole (lyrics – Suman Pokhrel), Nashalu Raat (lyrics – himself), Nazarke Uthayethen (lyrics – Mahesh Marseli) and three other songs After listening to the song Aaja Yo Andhyarole in Poudel's vocal and composition, Nepali theater maestro Sunil Pokharel organized his solo performance at Gurukul Theater in Kathmandu. He performed his solo at Gurukul Theater in June 2011 rendering songs of different genres, including ghazals and Nepali modern songs.

== Discography ==
Song title	Lyricist(s)	Artist(s)	Released Year	Album
Aaja Yo Andhyarole	Suman Pokhrel	Bednidhi Poudel	1999	Chadke Nazar
Nazar Ke Uthayethen	Mahesh Marseli	Bednidhi Poudel	1999	Chadke Nazar
Nasalu Raat	Bednidhi Poudel	Bednidhi Poudel	1999	Chadke Nazar
Aaja Yo Andhyarole	Suman Pokhrel	Samjhana Rai	2011	
Na Ta Din Bhayo	Suman Pokhrel	Dipen Rai	2011	
Satte Hola Timisangha	Suman Pokhrel	Sheela Rai	2012	
Pagliyera Pokhiun Jhain	Suman Pokhrel	Bednidhi Poudel	2013	
