= Sabin Rai =

Nepali singer and lyricist

Sabin Rai सबिन राई
- Born: 5 February 1974 (age 52)
- Origin: Dharan, Nepal
- Genres: Rock
- Occupation: Singer-songwriter
- Instruments: Vocals, guitar
- Years active: 1992–present

Sabin Rai (born;February 5,1974) is a Nepalese singer and composer. He made his debut in music industry by album Sataha (2003), featuring the hit single "Komal Tyo Timro" . In 2011, seeking to evolve his musical expression, Rai formed Sabin Rai and The Pharaoh. Also known as the Bryan Adams of Nepal because of his voice.

He has performed musical events and concerts in multiple countries. He is known for his stage performances and the interest he brings in his old songs by singing in different style. Now he has his own band called "Sabin Rai & The Pharaoh".

== Achievements ==
- 2003 AD – Best Album of the Year- Sataha- Hits FM
- 2003 AD – Best New Artist of the Year- Sataha- Image Channel
- 2004 AD – Best New Artist of the Year- Channel Nepal
- 2007 AD – Best Pop Composition- (Samjhana Harulai)
- 2007 AD – Best Vocal Performance- Ma Sansar Jitne
- 2009 AD – Chinnalata Award.
- 2015 AD – Best Song of the Year- Timi Nai Hau-(Sabin Rai & The Pharaoh) Hits FM
- 2020 AD - Best Rock Vocal Performance - Sabin Rai and The Pharaoh (Dhanyabaad)

        - Best Performance by a Group or Duo with Vocal - Sabin Rai and The       Pharaoh (Dhanyabaad)
        - Best Pop/Rock Composition – Sabin Rai and The Pharaoh (Dhanyabaad)[7] Hits FM

== Discography ==
=== Albums ===
- 2001 – Nine
- 2003 – Sataha
- 2004 – Sabin Rai Remixes
- 2006 – Sataha 2
- 2010 – Ranga Manch Ko Rang
- 2019 – Dhanyabaad

== Songs ==
- Komal Tyo Timro
- Afno Katha
- Maya
- Gurans Ko Fed Muni
- Samjhana Haru Lai
- Jau Ki Basu
- Timi Nai Hau
- Namuna
- Dui Thunga
- Ma Sansar Jitne
- Malai Angali Deu
- Timro Saath
- Timro Lagi Ma
- Timi Nai Mero
- Din Ra Raat
- Kalo Kalo Raat Ko
- Maya Jalaima
- Kina Ki Ma Maya Garchu
- Jaba Timi Ayeu
- Ekai Aakash Muni
- Samjhanchu
- Paisa
- Dhanyebad
- Baimaani
- Ranga
