= Arun Thapa =

Arun Thapa अरुण थापा

Background information
- Born: 6 January 1952; Calcutta, West Bengal, India
- Died: 22 July 1999 (aged 47) Kathmandu, Nepal
- Genres: World, folk
- Occupation: Singer-songwriter
- Instrument: Vocals
- Years active: 1970–1999

Arun Thapa Magar (6 January 1952 – 22 July 1999) was a Nepali singer and songwriter. In 2003, according to an international poll conducted by BBC, more than half-a million people from 165 countries voted his composition Reetu haruma timi hariyali basant (You are the spring amongst the seasons), his most famous romantic song, as the seventh in the world's top 10 most popular songs of all time.

== Personal life ==
Arun Thapa was born in Calcutta, India on 6 January 1952. His father was Ganju Prasad Thapa. His parents moved back to Nepal when Arun was 3 months old. He studied and grew up in Kathmandu, Nepal. He first studied in a school in Gana Bahal Tole then at JP School in Chettrapati, Kathmandu. Later he studied in Turnbull High school in Darjeeling, coming back to complete his School Leaving Certificate (SLC) from Kathmandu in 1971. He later studied at Prithvi Narayan Campus, Pokhara for an Intermediate in Arts degree but soon dropped out to pursue a career in music.

== Career ==
He first started singing at his college where he fell in love with a girl. Most of his songs were in memory of their relationship. He recorded many songs but his career started from super hit song Jati Maya Laye Pani where he received public affection. Before being a popular singer, he had worked in Nepal Bank Limited. Deep Shrestha was his best friend. They would always hang around together. He first sang his song in Radio Nepal in 1971.

== Death ==
Thapa have long been suffering from lung and liver ailment. He died on 22 July 1999 (5 Shrawan 2056 BS at 1815 hrs) in Kathmandu.

== Contributions ==
He had launched two music albums: Arun and The best of Arun. Both of the albums were very popular among the Nepalese music listeners. Thapa had continued his singing career for 30 years.

- Ritu Haruma Timi
- Sajhko Jun Sangai
- Chot Ke Ho Byatha Ke Ho
- Jati Maya Laae Pani
- Bhulu Bhulu Lagyo Malai
- Aankhako Need Khosi Lane
- Jindagi Ke Chaa Ra Aakhir
- Aru Sanga Najokha Malai
- Dosh Kasailaai Dina Chahhanna
- Timi Herchhau Bhane
- Yo Manko Ke Bhar Hunchha
- Na Pohkine Na Jokhine
- Mero Haath Na Badha (Last Recorded song)
