= Ciney Gurung =

Nepali musical artist (born 1977)

- Born: 8 December 1977 (age 48)
- Origin: Nepal
- Genres: Pop
- Occupation: Singer

Ciney Gurung (Nepali: सिने गुरुङ) is a singer, composer, and songwriter originally from Kurseong, Darjeeling and lives in Nepal now. She began her career with the hit songs "Timro Mayama" and "Mann". In 2009, Radio Kantipur named Gurung the best female pop singer of the year. Gurung married musician, Rojesh Shrestha, in 2005 and they have a daughter together. Gurung also participated in Melancholy, an environmental song by 365 Nepali artists which set a Guinness World Record for the "Most Vocal Solos in a Song Recording". It was written, composed and directed by environmentalist Nipesh DHAKA.

== Albums ==
- Yo Man
