= Ram Prasad Khanal =

Singer, Music Composer, Actor and Journalist

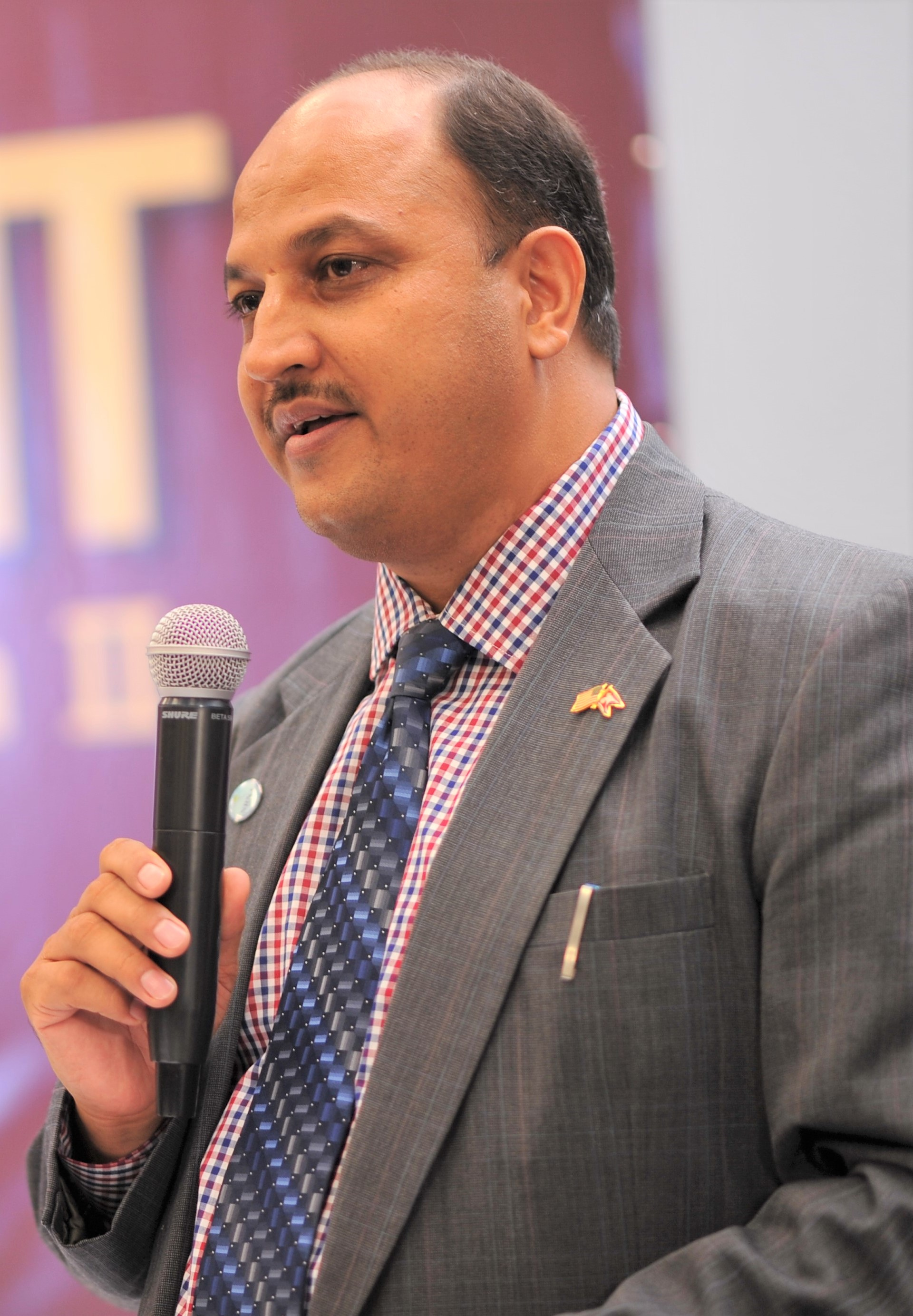
- Born: Hardineta, Dharampani, Maindanda, Gulmi Nepal
- Education: Master's Degree (Sociology)
- Occupations: Author, Singer, Actor, Business Entrepreneur & Journalist
- Years active: Since 1983
- Known for: Folk Singer, writer, journalist, Actor, Business Entrepreneur
- Spouse: Tirtha Poudel
- Children: Gyanendra Khanal & Susma Khanal
- Parent(s): Bhabhishwor Khanal & Rundata Khanal
- Awards: Gorkha Dakshin Bahu, 2004, Prakhyat Trishakti Patta, 2005
- Website: ramprasadkhanal.com

Ram Prasad Khanal (Nepali: रामप्रसाद खनाल) is a Nepalese musician, distinguished class singer, and folk-music activist. He has worked for the growth and development of Nepali folk music for decades. He is an author, journalist, artist, actor, composer, and radio and TV program producer, director and presenter. He serves as President of the International Artists Forum. He has mainly been known for his Nepali folk and duet songs and his activism in the field of folk music.

Khanal moved to the United States of America a decade ago and has been living there with his family since then. In the US, he is involved in different business activities.

He started a program titled Lok Dohori, based on folk duet songs, on Nepal Television in 1998, which considerably promoted his fame in the field. This program not only popularized the Nepali folk and duet songs, but it also contributed profoundly to the renaissance of Nepali folk music. The folk movement that this program pushed throughout the country created a conducive environment in which many folk singers were born.

Though he is living in the US with a green card granted to him in the Extraordinary Ability EB-1 visa category, he is still contributing to Nepali folk songs, duet songs, folk culture, and Nepali language and literature from overseas. Khanal, who has worked to promoted Nepali folk music and establish it in the international arena, has had seventeen poetry anthologies and ghazals published. While he has released forty-eight albums of Nepali folk music, he also has more than 1 thousand two hundred lyrics published and broadcast.

He has been awarded the Prabal Gorakha Dakshina Bahu, one of the most prestigious Nepali national awards granted to civilians, for his exceptional contribution to Nepali folk music, duet songs and the entire field of Nepali music by the government of Nepal. He was also awarded the Trishakti Patta, another highly recognized Nepali national award, for his significant contributions in the field of journalism. Along with this, he has also been granted more than four hundred awards and prizes in Nepal and beyond. One of the significant of them is 'Man of the Year 2004 for Nepal International Award that was awarded to him by the American Biographical Institute (ABI).

He has published 17 books and two anthologies of poems, Desh Harayako Manchhe (The Man Who has Lost the Nation) and Murdaharuko Basti (Domain of the Dead). He has also published autobiographies entitled Teeta Mitha Anubhutiharu (Feelings, Sweet and Sour) and Gulmi Dekhi America Samma (From Gulmi to the United States).

== Early life and education ==
He was born in Dharampani, Hardineta, Maindanda, Gulmi District, Nepal. He was born as the second child, among seven siblings, to Bhavishor Khanal (father) and Rundata Devi Khanal (mother). He was born in a middle-class family, and his father worked in Assam Rifles, India. He completed his primary education in Maindanda Lower Secondary School, Hardineta, Dharampani, and secondary education in Shree Adarsha Secondary School, Digam, Gulmi. He studied in Butwal Multiple Campus and completed his master's degree (sociology) at Tribhuvan University, Kirtipur later.

== Marriage ==
Khanal married Tirtha Paudel from Rimuwa, Gulmi in 1993. They have a son (Gyanendra Khanal) and a daughter (Susma Khanal). He currently lives in Virginia, United States together with his family.

== Careers in music ==
Khanal had a strong interest in music from a very young age, consequently winning him the first prizes in various contests in different levels. In addition to music, he also had an interest in dance. He passed the vocal test in Radio Nepal three decades ago and since then he has been active in the field of music. He has forty-eight music albums published in his name. Some of his popular duet songs are "Deuralima pipal chhayale", "Chhata ojhel parideu barkhe jharima", "Bishal bazaarma man paryo mayalai ekai najarma", and "Rel pugyo baibaimaa". Similarly, other popular numbers include "Mera budha jharke", "Kasta bhaya holan ti gaunghar", "Saya kateki hajuraama", "Gulmi jharera, ridi tarera", "Chamkyo Juntara", "Ekai najarama", "Chitthi lekhera", and "Bagne panile". The latest panche baja folk songs such as "Dulahadulahi", and "Ghargharko Kahani" and other songs are equally popular.

== Career in journalism ==
Khanal started his journalism career together with his studies in 1987. He started to publish his news and other literary creations in the Tansen-based Satya Saptahik and Butwal-based X-ray Weekly. He not only wrote news, but also involved himself in the registration and marketing of the newspaper Janasangharsha Dainik in Butwal in 1989. He also worked for different newspaper outlets such as Rashtra Pukar, Nepalvani, Nepali Patra, Nepal Times, Gorakha Express, Lokpatra, Sandesha, Nispakshya, Lumbini Times, etc. in various roles ranging from reporting to editorial responsibilities. He started to publish Nishpakshya weekly in which he had the roles of both publisher and editor. It was published in print until he moved to the US. In 2007, he began publishing it in an online version as www.nepalmother.com, in which he is publisher and chief editor.

== Career in Radio Nepal ==
After the restoration of democracy in Nepal in 1990, a program entitled Ghatana ra Bichar was very popular on Radio Nepal. He started to work for the program from Butwal as a representative of Lumbini Zone. In 1998, he joined Radio Nepal as the presenter, producer and director of the program Nepalko Serophero. He also worked for BBC Radio from 1991 to 1995 as a freelancer.

== Career in Nepal Television ==
Khanal started his television career as an actor at Nepal Television on the program Hijo aajaka kura conducted by artist and comedian Santosh Panta. From 1996 to 1999, he acted in the popular show Hijo Ajaka Kura, which was directed by actor and director Santosh Pant. He worked for the programs Nepalko Serophero in 1999 and Vidhyut in 2000. He started the popular show Lok Dohori in 1998 and worked as producer, presenter and director. At a time when pop music was a trend in Nepal and folk music was overshadowed, his program not only popularized Nepali folk music but also gave birth to many new singers in the field. Due to the popularity of this program, Lok Dohori programs started on other television stations as well. Similarly, many pubs in Kathmandu and outside the valley started to present live Lok Dohori shows on a daily basis in the evenings. Khanal had direct and indirect roles in the changing trend. Khanal also served Nepal Television Management Board as a member of the Board of Directors.

== Journey to the USA ==
Prior to his permanent residency in the US from 2006, Khanal had visited the United States thirteen times. He got an American Green Card under the Extraordinary Ability EB-1 visa category in 2007. After working for Walmart in the role of Customer Service Manager for two and half years, he started his own business in the grocery store, gas station and real estate industries in 2010. In addition to his business, he is also continuing his work in literature, music and journalism. Since moving to Washington, D.C., there has been an increase in the literary, cultural, and musical activities of the Nepali diaspora.

== Social engagement ==
Khanal took a leading role in establishing the International Artists Forum in 2008 for promoting Nepali art, culture, literature and music internationally. He is the founding chairman of the forum, which has united artists and litterateurs from around 35 countries. He has also worked for the Washington, D.C. Metro Committee Chair of the International Nepali Literature Society. Similarly, he has also worked for social organizations such as Reiyukai, Red Cross, and Lions Club. He is currently the Chair of US-based International Media and Entertainment House and Khanal Business Group and American Supermarket. He is also engaged with other dozens of social organizations. In addition, he is the chief editor and publisher of nepalmother.com.

== Awards ==
- Gorkha Dakshin Bahu, Nepal Government, 2004
- Prakhyat Trishakti Patta, Nepal Government, 2005
- Man of the Year 2004 for Nepal, American Biographical Institute (ABI), 2004
- Star of the year, 2019 by Star of the king, Qatar.
- Nepal Scout national Journalism award by Nepal Scouts, 2004
- Folk and Duet Hero, Khanal Sewa Samaj, 2004
- Outstanding Folk Duet Prize, United Nations, 2004
- Education Journalism and Singing Prize, World Health Organization, 1995
- Nearly four hundred fifty national and regional prizes and awards
