= Shambhu Rai =

- Born: Shambhu Rai; Pakhribas-10, Chungbang, Dhankuta, Nepal
- Genres: आधुनिक (Modern/Pop), लोक (Folk)
- Occupation(s): Singer, Songwriter, Musician, Producer
- Instrument: sarangi

Shambhu Rai (Nepali: शम्भू राई) is a Nepali singer, songwriter, musician and music producer. He is currently vice chancellor of the Nepal Academy of Music and Drama. His songs include चिट्ठी तिमीलाई लेखु भन्छु, यो मन भन्छ कहाँ जाऊ, चलेछ बतास सुस्तरी and आलु दम चाना. He also plays sarangi, a short-necked fiddle used throughout South Asia
