= Nabin K Bhattarai =

Nepalese singer

King of Nepali Pop Music Nabin K Bhattarai
- नबिन के भट्टराई
- Born: 14 March 1974 (age 52); Dillibazar, Kathmandu
- Education: Ethnomusicology
- Occupations: Singer; Lyricist
- Years active: 1982–present
- Spouse: Nabina Bhattarai
- Children: 2
- Musical career
- Origin: Kathmandu, Nepal
- Genre: Pop
- Instruments: Vocals; drums; keyboards; guitar

Nabin K Bhattarai (Note: Nepali: नबिन के भट्टराई) (born 14 March 1974) is a Nepalese singer, lyricist, and composer known for his significant contributions to modern pop music. He rose to prominence in the 1990s and was frequently described by Nepalese news media as the “King of Nepali Pop Music” for his influential role in shaping contemporary Nepalese pop music through his popular romantic and melodic songs.

== Education ==
Bhattarai studied at Budhanilkantha School in Kathmandu, where his notable classmates and close friends included Nepal's former Crown Prince Paras Bir Bikram Shah, Nepalese actor Suraj Singh Thakuri, and Finance Minister Swarnim Wagle. After completing school, he briefly attended Nepal Science Campus for his Intermediate in Science (ISC) before leaving the programme and joining the Music Department at Kathmandu University in Bhaktapur. He trained in Eastern classical music under the renowned musicians Nararaj Dhakal and later Prabhuraj Dhakal. He holds a bachelor's degree in ethnomusicology.

== Musical career ==
Bhattarai started his musical career in 1990 with the band "The Steel Wheels" as the vocalist and rhythm guitarist for the band. After the band disbanded, he pursued a solo career. He was able to capture the attention of many Nepali music-lovers with his first released song Aankhama Timilai from the album Raharai Raharma which instantly made him a household name in Nepal. After the huge success of his first album, he has recorded eleven more albums from 1990 till date. His most recent album is Slok. Nabin K Bhattarai is considered to be the first real pop-star and unarguably one of the greatest pop singers of the country with an enormous fan following.

He has won the Sajjan Smriti Pop Song Competition Award for Best Male Vocalist on two occasions, first for Preetka Geet and then for Aankhama Timilai. He also won Album of the Year Award for Raharai Raharama. He further won the Shikhar Hits FM Music Awards 2054 (1997) on Best Male Vocal category for his hit single Sanjhapakha. He has also won the Chhinnalata Award, and at that time he was the youngest artist to receive that award. His album Aabhash is unarguably one of the most popular Nepali music album in the country's contemporary musical history. He also won Hits FM Music Awards 2060 (2003) for his sixth album Nabin. He has also won several other awards and recognition afterwards. Some of his notable hits include Sanjhapakha', Timilai Ma Dobatoma, Timile Herda Kasailai, Timilai Bhetne, Chaina Joona', Yaad Le Timro and many others. As of 2011, he had been seen a lot in social works. He is also known for doing live shows.

== Musical style ==
Most of Nabin K Bhattarai's earlier songs have a melodic pop style to them, depicting the loneliness of a young lover. While his first four albums Raharai Raharma, Aabhas, Smriti, Samjhana, and Samarpan had a more melodic style, he began experimenting around his sixth album, Nabin. Many of his compositions after "Nabin" include elements of rock in them, which was positively received by the Nepali audience. In all his successive albums, he has tried to add a new musical element and contribute something different to the Nepali music industry. His song Ali Alikati Pida from the album G-Major was critically acclaimed by many for its folk and pop mix and the affluent use of musical instruments. His collaborations with Rajan Raj Shiwakoti are highly appreciated by the audience. He is known as the 'king of Nepali Pop'.

== Discography ==
=== Studio albums ===
- Avash
- G Major
- Kathmandu
- Nabin
- Nakshatra
- Raharai Raharma
- Samarpan
- Samjhana
- Slok
- Smriti
- The Blue
- जिन्दगी (with the Wheels Band, before starting solo career)

== Personal life ==
Bhattarai is married to Nabina Rajbhandari Bhattarai, and they have two sons. The couple first met in Pokhara at a concert by Nabin K Bhattarai in 2009. Nabina, a fan of Nabin, had attended the concert with her brother. After the concert, she went on to the backstage and got Nabin's phone number after several requests. They stayed in touch and dated for a few weeks before Nabin asked her to marry him.

== See also ==
- Music of Nepal
- List of bands from Nepal
