= Rohit John Chettri =

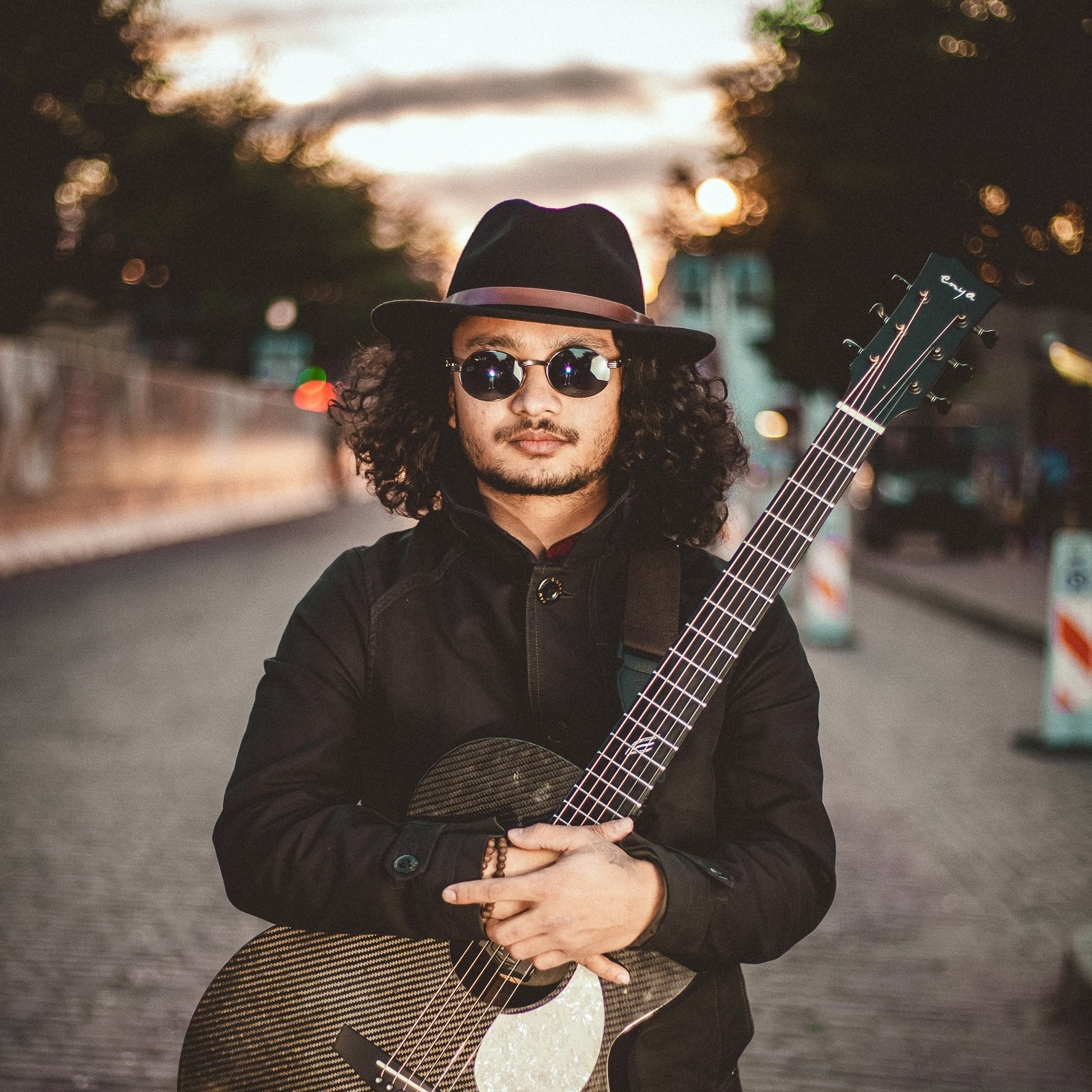
- Rohit John Chettri with his guitar at Fort Worth, TX, United States
- Born: Rohit Chettri; April 12, 1991 (age 35); Kathmandu, Nepal
- Citizenship: Nepal
- Occupations: Singer, songwriter, music producer, music composer, restaurateur
- Known for: Singer, songwriter
- Parents: Robin John Chettri (father); Reema Shrestha Chettri (mother)
- Musical career
- Genres: Pop; R&B
- Instruments: Vocals; drums; piano; keyboard; guitar
- Years active: 2013–present
- Formerly of: 1974 AD
- Website: www.rohitjohnchettri.com

Rohit John Chettri, also known as RJC, is a vocalist, musician, music producer, lyricist and guitarist from Kathmandu.

== Early life ==
Chettri's father was a music lover, and they used to play musical instruments like guitar and harmonium together when his father would come back home in the evening after work.

When he was seven years old, he took part in an inter-school competition where he had to choose to either dance, sketch or sing, Chettri sang a song of Karna Das called "Jindagi ko k bharosa" and realized he would become a singer-songwriter. After class 10, or SLC, Chettri started performing at various pubs, bars and private events.

In 2011, he started working at Kathmandu Jazz Conservatory.

== Breakthrough ==
Chettri's song ‘Bistarai’ received more than a million views. Chettri played at pubs and bars to raise money for the production of his first album, and two years after his YouTube breakthrough, Chettri released his first solo album, "Bistarai Bistarai" in September 2015. Chhetri gave vocal to 'herdai jau' (A song from a movie Keti Harayeko Suchana).

== 1974 AD ==
Chettri became a part of the Nepalese rock band 1974 AD in 2015 when Adrian Pradhan and Phiroj Shyagden left the band for personal reasons. Chettri was chosen to fill their spot.

Together, the "new" 1974 AD released the album "Hazaar Sapana" in 2016.

Album – "Hazaar Sapana"
Songs	Released date
Hazar Sapana	2016
Saani Ko	2016
Salghari	2016
Aru Kalo	2016
Bagdai Gareko	2016
Chaya	2016
Pathai deu na	2016
Timi Mero Ma Timro	2016

== Solo albums ==
First Album "Bistarai Bistarai"

Album – "Bistarai Bistarai"
Song	Year released
Bistarai	2013
Timra Dui Ankhama	2014
Pani Paryo	2015
Timi Nai	2016
Kalo Sanjh	2016
Sannani	2016
Sapani Ma	2016
Jani Jani	2016

Second Album "Jhari Pachi ko Indreni"

Album – "Jhari Pachi ko Indreni"
Song	Year released
Har Saas	2018
Gunaso	2018
Kina Kina	2018
Birseko Chainau	2018
Dhungale	2018
Timilai Samjhi	2018
Nayan Ma	2018
Aankhama	2018

Third Album "Bidaai"

Album – "Bidaai"
Song	Released date
Bidaai	2019
Chahana	2020
Badal	2020
Yo Mannako Kura	2020
Jooni Jooni	2020

Fourth Album "Mitho Yaad"

Single – "Mitho Yaad"
Song	Released date	Ref
Mitho Yaad	2024	
