= Ramesh Dahal =

Nepalese songwriter and lyricist

Ramesh Dahal रमेश दहाल
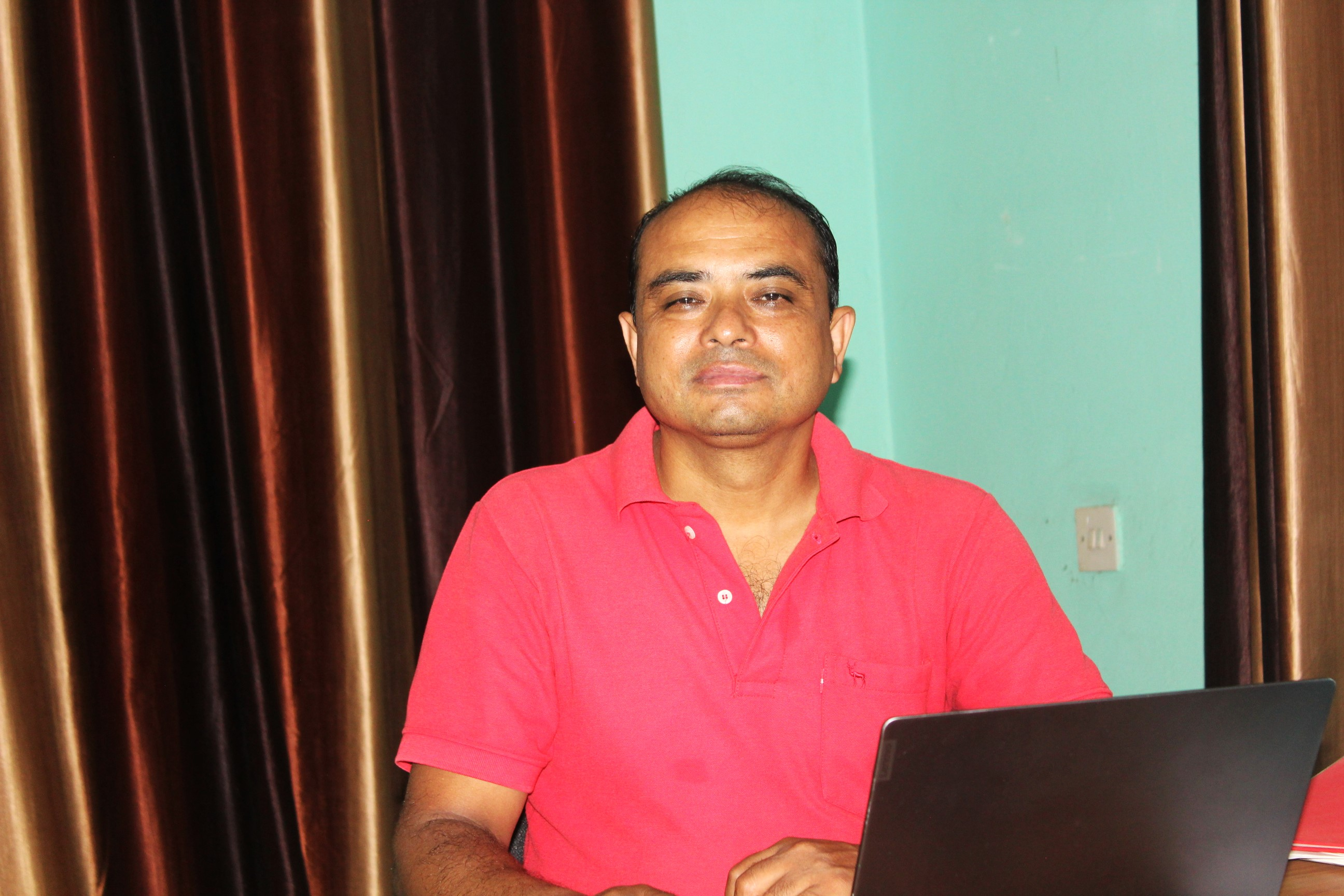

Background information
- Born: Dolakha, Nepal
- Origin: Nepal
- Genres: Nepali modern songs
- Occupation: lyricist/songwriter
- Years active: 1995-present
- Website: Ramesh Dahal

Ramesh Dahal (Nepali: रमेश दहाल ) is a Nepali songwriter and lyricist. He was born in 1978 in Mainapokhari, Dolakha. He writes songs in various genres including modern, patriotic, pop, and folk music, and has published two collections of his song lyrics.

== Early life and education ==
Dahal spent his childhood at Charikot, Dolakha. His father wrote song lyrics which he also performed, which served as an inspiration.

He graduated from Kalinchwok Secondary School in 1995. He has studied civil engineering, and he has Master's degrees in sociology and business studies; he also studied environmental science and policy at Clark University.

== Writing ==
He started writing song lyrics as a teenager in 1990, when he was still at school. In 2000, his first song 'Pheri Timro Samjnale' was recorded; in the following year, the song "Phool Ko Thunga" with music by Ram Thapa and lyrics by Dahal was recorded for Radio Nepal. He has recorded more than 300 songs, and published two collections of his songs. He won the Nationwide Modern Song competition organized by Radio Nepal in 2009 and again in 2020. He is cited to write social songs. His writing focuses on uprooting social misdoings.

He has published articles about the effect of music and its role in society, in English and Nepali newspapers. He has published two anthologies of lyrical poems, named Baluwako Ghar and Hiunko Phool.

His song lyrics focus on social issues, such as the concept of chhaupadi (menstrual taboo), and patriotic themes. He has cited the works of Madhav Prasad Ghimire, Rajendra Thapa, Kiran Kharel, and Bhairab Nath Rimal 'Kadam', as well as English language song writers Sam Cooke and Bob Dylan, as sources of inspiration.

== Awards ==
SN	Awards Name	Category	Songs	Result
1	10th Music Khabar Music Award 2022	Best Pop Lyricist of the Year	Kauwa Karayo	Winner
2	22nd Image Awards 2022	Best Lyrics of the Year	Aafai Hidne Bhirko Bato	Winner
3	Lyricists' Association of Nepal(LAN)	Best Song of the Year Award 2020	Aphai Hidne Bhirko Bato	Winner
4	7th National Capital Awards-2020	Best Patriotic Song of the Year	Ye Jhanda	Winner
5	8th Prabhu Pay Music Khabar Music Awards-2019	Best Patriotic Song of the Year	Janani Janmabhumischa	Winner
6	2nd Sagarmatha Music Awards-2000	Best Patriotic Lyrics of the Year	Janani Janmabhumischa	Winner
7	Industrial Peace Nepal Music Awards-2019	Best Pop Lyrics of the Year	Mitho Geet	Winner
8	Natyashwar Music Award 2020	Best Modern Lyrics of the Year (Jury)	Purbako Badal Jalyo	Winner
9	Genius Music Award 2018	Best Patriotic Lyrics of the Year	Janani Janmabhumisch	Winner
10	Nationwide Modern Song Competition of Radio Nepal 2009	Best Lyrics of the Year	Purbako Badal	Winner
11	Nationwide Modern Song Competition of Radio Nepal 2020	Best Lyrics of the Year	Batabharika Tagara	Winner

== Lyrical Anthologies ==
SN	Name of Anthology	Sales Volume	Publisher	Year of Publication
1	Baluwako Ghar (बालुवाको घर)	65000+	Sharmila Basnet	2005
2	Hiunko Phool(हिउँको फूल)	85000+	Sharmila Basnet	2018

== Songs ==
SN	Songs	Composer	Singer	Publish Year
1	Pheri Timro Samjhanale	Ganesh Parajuli	Yasoda Parajuli	1997
2	Manchhe Haru	Ram Thapa	Diwakar Sharma	2002
3	Kinarama Ubhiera	Shila Bahadur Moktan	Shital Moktan & Subani Moktan	2002
4	Kahile Banla Hamro Gaunma	Shakti Ballav Shrestha	Ananda Karki & Mandavi Tripathi	2006
5	Sajh Parepachhi	Om Bikram Bista	Om Bikram Bista	2007
6	Gaun Chhodi Shahar Pase	Chandra Kumar Dong	Karna Das	2008
7	Appale Bhanthe	Chandra Kumar Dong	Indira Gurung	2009
8	Mayama Kurna	Kalyan Singh	Norbu Tamang	2009
9	Timro Othko Akriti	Nima Rumba	Nima Rumba	2009
10	Purbako Badal	Bhanu Thapa	Deep Shrestha	2010
11	Chhiti Maile	Amar Tandukar	Amar Tanbdukar	2010
12	Khairo Khairo Kapal Timro	Adrian Pradhan	Adrian Pradhan	2013
13	Socheko Jati Sabai Kura	Tika Dahal	Abun Pandey	2015
14	Janani Janmabhumischa	Shakti Ballav Shrestha	Sumit Khadka	2017
15	Milteriko Jutta	Tika Dahal	Pawan Giri	2018
16	Aama Malai	Danney Niraula	Bishow Nepali	2019
17	Timi Lai Bhetda	Kamal Khanal	Shwaroop Raj Acharya	2019
18	Hunna Hunna	Tika Dahal	Buddha Lama & Sajja Chaulagai	2020
19	Sundar Phool	Raju Lama	Raju Lama	2020
20	Ye Jhanda	Santosh Shrestha	Ram Krishna Dhakal	2021
21	Aphai Hindne Bhirko Bato	Santosh Shrestha	Karna Das	2022
22	Nepaliko Manma	Bipin Acharya	Sumit Khadka & Anju Gautam	2022
23	Naudanda Pari	Tika Dahal	Raju Lama	2023
24	Jani Tale Pani Juta	Suraj Pandit	Suraj Pandit	2023
