= Sajjan Raj Vaidya =

Nepali singer-songwriter (born 1991)

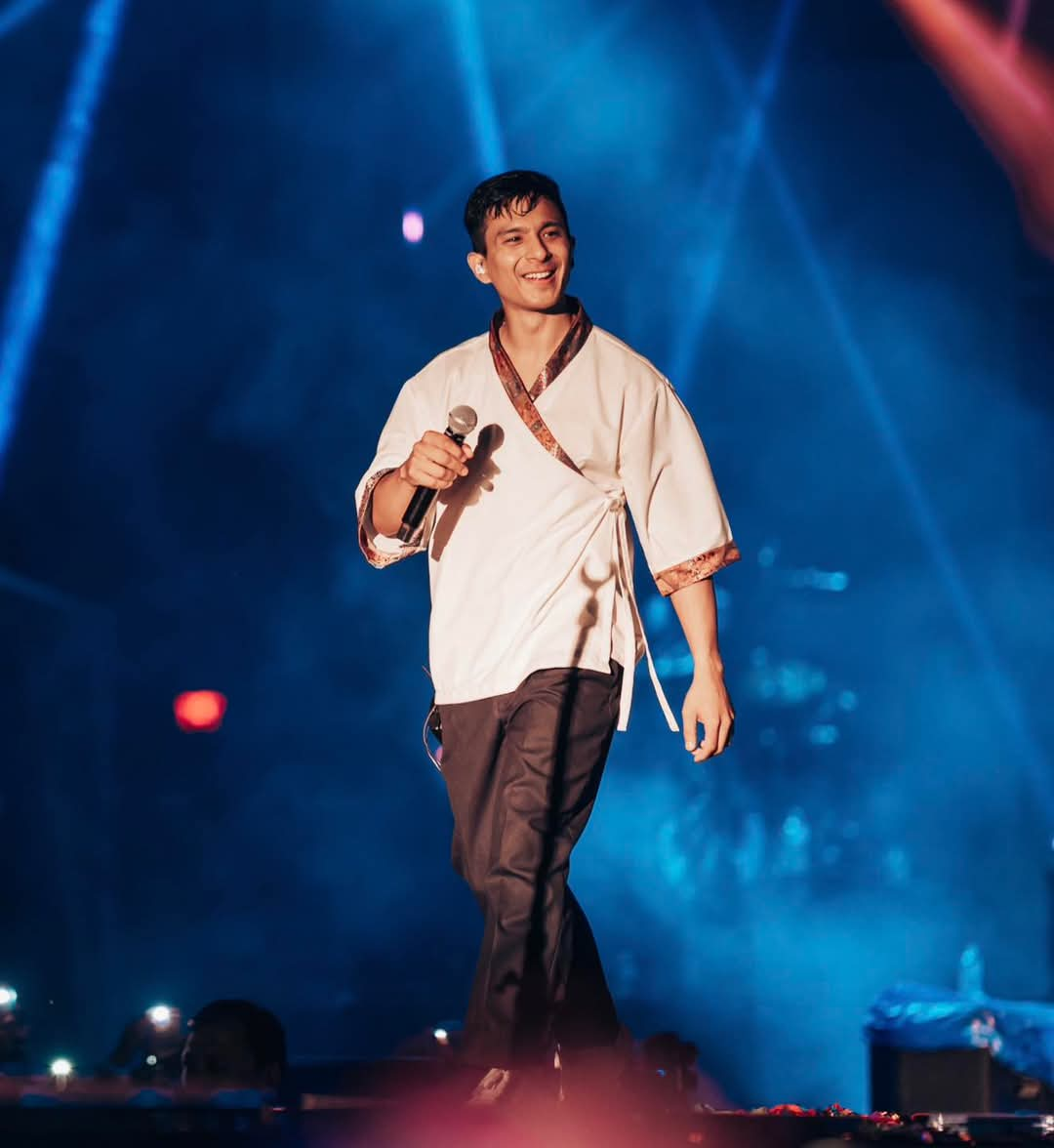
- Sajjan Raj Vaidya live in Butwal

Background information
- Born: September 10, 1991 (age 34)
- Origin: Kathmandu, Nepal
- Genres: Acoustic; Pop; Electronic
- Occupations: Singer; Songwriter; Guitarist; Composer; Music Producer
- Instruments: Vocals; Guitar; Piano; Bass; Keyboard
- Years active: 2014–present
- Website: sajjanrajvaidya.com

YouTube information
- Channel: Sajjan Raj Vaidya
- Years active: 2012–present
- Subscribers: 1.62 million
- Views: 766 million
- Last updated: 04 August, 2026

Sajjan Raj Vaidya (Nepali: सज्जन राज वैद्य) is a Nepali singer. He released his debut single, "Aaja Matra", in 2014 and rose to prominence after the release of his singles "Hawaijahaj" (2016) and "Chitthi Bhitra" (2018). One of his most widely known singles is "Hataarindai, Bataasindai". His release, titled "BLYHL", was released in February 2020. His song, "Phutki Janey Jovan" released on 16 May 2020 shows various clips of people during the COVID-19 pandemic all around the world, with a special emphasis on Nepali people.

He then released "Lukaamaari" on January 1, 2021. After 3 months of "Lukaamaari", he released his next song, "Ultaa Paailaa". He also released the songs "Parkhaai" and "Naganya Maya" by the time, he released his two new singles "Sasto Mutu" and "Ek Sarvanaam" at the beginning of 2022, followed by a series of 2023 hits: "Dhairya," "Hyatteri," "Aayen Ma," "Nothing In My Head Besides Timi," "Ujeli," and "Suna Kaanchi." In 2024, he unveiled "Malaai Chaana Na" and "Ghumi Phiri," with his latest single "Nepali Angreji" showcasing his exploration of language. Vaidya is set to embark on his "Ekaadeshmaa 2024 Nepal" tour, spanning multiple cities during the festive season. He has just released a lighthearted new single titled "9841" just ahead of the Ekaadeshmaa event.

== Early life ==
Sajjan Raj Vaidya was born on September 10, 1993, and raised in Kathmandu, Nepal. He was introduced to music by his family and credited his style, influences, and musical development to his family: “My story with music began with my family. My mother taught me how to sing, my father taught us to listen to music in all its forms and my brother taught me to evolve with music. So any style or influence I have is constituted by parts of what I learned from my family. My continuity in music comes from my sheer love for it.”

Vaidya's early influences include various genres with artists such as The Eagles, UB40, Linkin Park and Karna Das among others. He started performing live during his school days and later began publishing his work through Facebook.

== Career ==
Vaidya's first major release was "Aaja Matra" (2014). His next single, "Hawaijahaj" (2016) was a breakthrough. The music video for the song was produced by Fuzz Factory Productions. He later (re)released "Mooskaan" (2018) and "Anountho Mutu" (2018). On 1 January 2019, Sajjan released a single titled "Hataarindai, Bataasindai". The screenplay features a straight couple and a gay couple, and the video depicts a gay couple kissing, which is uncommon in Nepali media. Vaidya is one of the very few Nepali artists to represent the LGBTQ community through the video's release.

"When I wrote Hataarindai, Bataasindai, it was independent of the video concept. We decided that the underrepresentation of the LGBTQ community in Nepal was an important issue that needed to be addressed and that is how the video came about." The 2019's single has been adopted by the LGBTQ community of Nepal as an anthem, featuring the song during the first pride parade of Nepal that took place in July 2019.

== Katha ==
Katha is a video series started by Vaidya in 2018. The series debuted in the artist's YouTube channel. The video series features a live, acoustic rendition of a song published by the artist or other artists, and also includes a section discussing the origin and the composition process of the song.

=== Episodes ===
S.N	Title	Artists	Year
1.	Nothing in my Head Besides Timi	Sajjan Raj Vaidya	2018
2.	Mellow	Sajjan Raj Vaidya	2019
3.	Mari Jau	Sajjan Raj Vaidya And Bikki Gurung	2019
4.	Purva Jaaney Panchi	Sajjan Raj Vaidya And Joyous Gurung	2020
5.	Alapatra	Sajjan Raj Vaidya And Yabesh Thapa	2022
6.	Aaundai Jaandai	Sajjan Raj Vaidya, Sarun Tamrakar And Manish Gandharva	2023
7.	Jeevan	Sajjan Raj Vaidya And Dixita Karki	2023
8.	Tadhiera	Sajjan Raj Vaidya And Wangden Sherpa	2023

== Discography ==
Features Singles of Sajjan Raj Vaidya

S.N	Title	Date	Year
1.	Aaja Matra	May 21	2014
2.	Hawaijahaj	Aug 02	2016
3.	Mayaloo	Aug 01	2017
4.	Chitthi Bhitra	Jan 01	2018
5.	Anountho Mutu	Feb 04	2018
6.	Mooskaan	Apr 22	2018
7.	Mellow	Nov 17	2018
8.	Hataarindai, Bataasindai	Jan 02	2019
9.	Pahaar	Jul 20	2019
10.	Kuraakaani	Nov 11	2019
11.	Somebody Else	Jan 02	2020
12.	Sukumbaasi	Feb 14	2020
13.	BLYHL	Mar 20	2020
14.	Phutki Jaaney Jovan	May 15	2020
15.	Lukaamaari	Jan 01	2021
16.	Ultaa Paaila	Apr 10	2021
17.	Parkhaai	Jul 09	2021
18.	Naganya Maya	Oct 31	2021
19.	Sasto Mutu	Jan 01	2022
20.	Ek Sarvanaam	Feb 14	2022
21.	Dhairya	Oct 21	2022
22.	Hyatteri	Jan 01	2023
23.	Aayen Ma	Apr 13	2023
24.	Nothing in my Head Besides Timi	Jun 16	2023
25.	Ujeli	Jul 21	2023
26.	Suna Kaanchi	Oct 20	2023
27.	Malaai Chaana Na	Jan 01	2024
28.	Ghumi Phiri	Jun 07	2024
29.	Nepali Angreji	Jul 13	2024
30.	9841	Sep 28	2024
31.	Ka Kha Ga	Jan 01	2025
32.	Ekaadeshmaa	Feb 11	2025
32.	Chautari	Apr 01	2025
33.	Basanta	May 17	2025
34.	Behuli	July 05	2025
35.	Khelauna	11 Aug	2025
36.	Suskera	Nov 07	2025
37.	Patra	Jan 01	2026
38.	Juni	May 27	2026
39.	Junkiri (with TWK)	July 1	2026
40.	Bidai	Aug 03	2026

== Recognition ==
1. Best New Artist (2018)
2. Artist of the Month (March 2019)
