= Kalyan Gautam =

Nepalese radio jockey

Kalyan Raj Gautam
- कल्याण राज गौतम
- Born: Nepal
- Other names: Dear Kalyan
- Occupations: Radio jockey; storyteller
- Years active: 1996-present
- Known for: Mero Katha
- Spouse: Sanjana Giri (m. 2002)
- Children: 2
- Presenting career
- Show: Mero Katha
- Stations: Image FM 97.9; Hits FM
- Style: Storytelling

Kalyan Raj Gautam (Nepali: कल्याण राज गौतम), better known as Dear Kalyan, is a Nepalese storyteller and radio jockey. Gautam has written the novel Radio Chhaap Salai (transl. Radio Printing), which was published in 2012.

== Personal life ==
Kalyan Raj Gautam married one of his fans, Sanjana Giri, in early 2002. They have two children, a daughter, and a son.

== Career ==
Gautam started his career as radio jockey in 1996 on Hits FM with the show named Mero Geet Mero Katha (transl. My Song My Story), where he introduced himself as Dear Kalyan to the audience.
