= Buddhi Krishna Lamichhane =

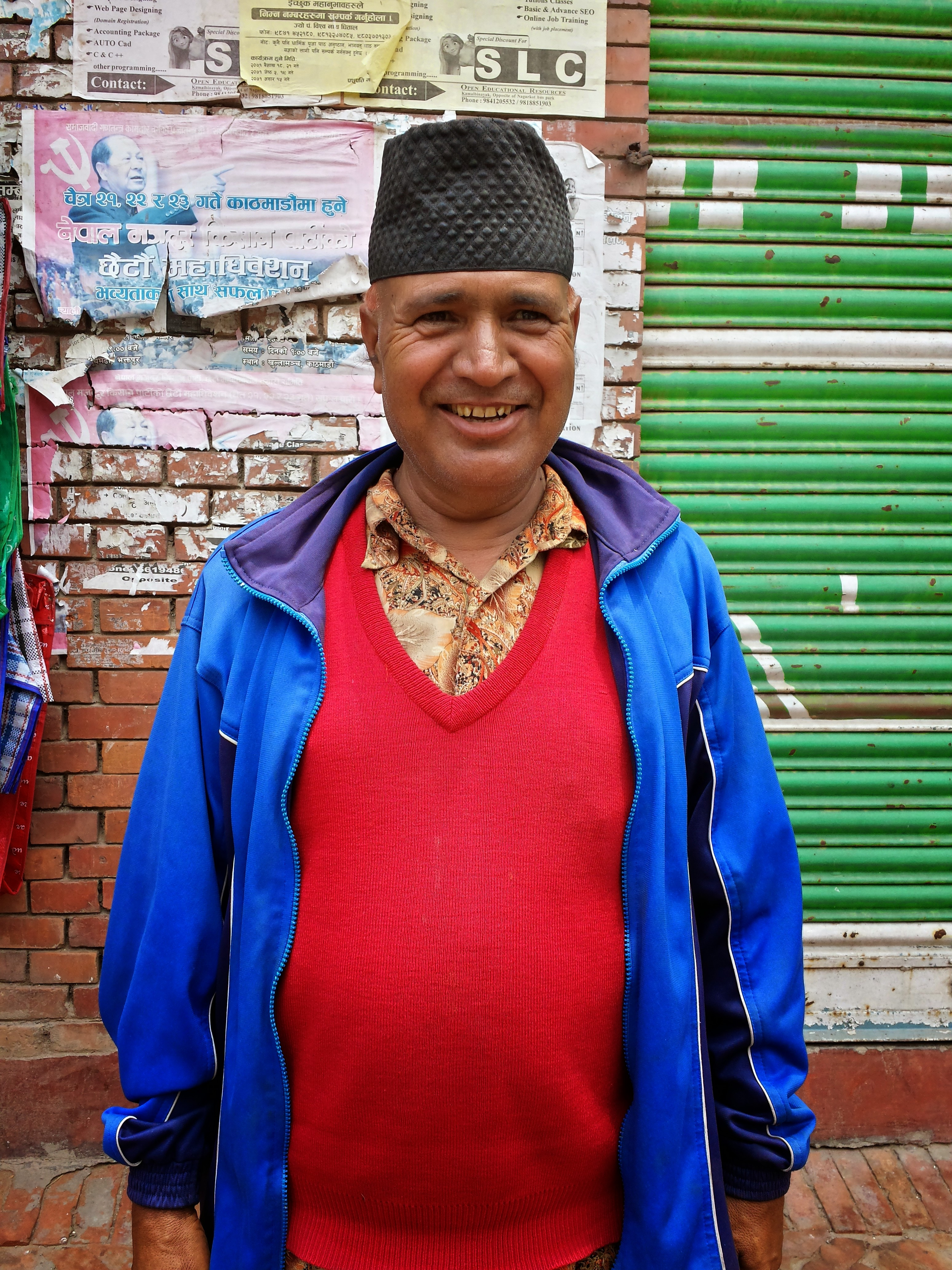
- Lamichhane in 2014
- Born: c. 1955
- Died: 28 December 2018
- Occupation: Folk singer
- Years active: 1980s–2018
- Children: 5

Buddhi Krishna Lamichhane (c. 1955 – 28 December 2018) was a Nepali folk singer known for songs including Ghans Katne Khurkera, Pidi Ma Basera and Merai Bato Herera. He was active in Nepali folk music from the 1980s.

== Career ==
Lamichhane passed the voice test of Radio Nepal in 2039 BS (1982–83), after which he began recording folk songs. His song Ghans Katne Khurkera Aayo Jovan Hurkera brought him recognition, followed by Pidi Ma Basera Merai Bato Herera. He was also known for his energetic performances. Lamichhane served in the Nepal Army for 20 years.

Among his other popular songs were Timro Ra Mero Mayako Doro, Gaita Badhne Patako Damlo, Fateko Daura Layera, Yei Mayama Yei Mayama and Parnu Paryo Pir.

== Death ==
Lamichhane died at his home in Changunarayan Municipality-7, Bhaktapur, on 28 December 2018. He was reported to have been 63 years old. He had been bedridden for a prolonged period due to paralysis and was receiving treatment for pneumonia shortly before his death. He was survived by his wife, two sons and three daughters.
