= Pattabong Tea Garden =

Pattabong Tea Garden Puttabong (Tukvar) Tea Estate
- Village
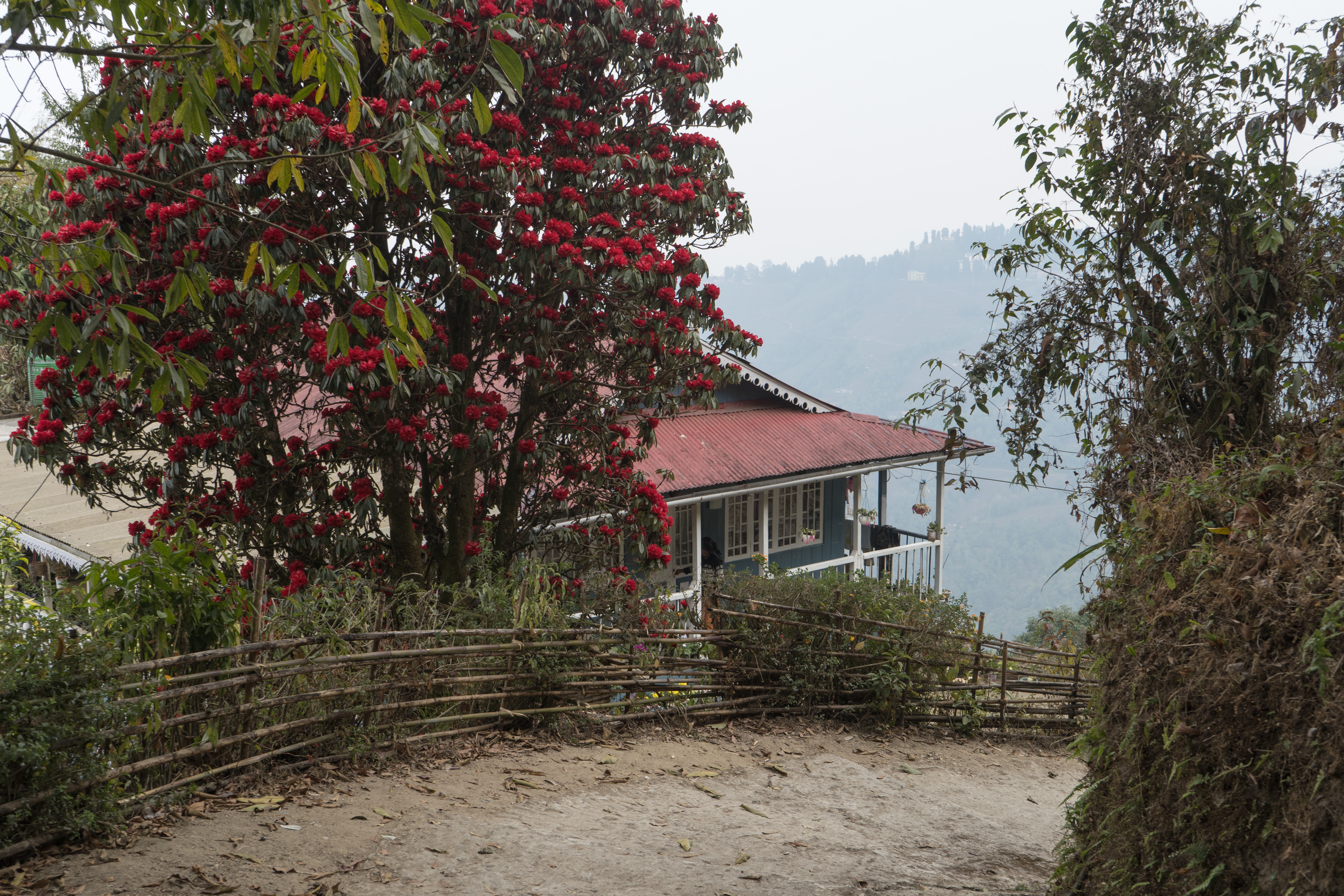

- Location in West Bengal, India Pattabong Tea Garden (India)
- Coordinates: 27.06762°N 88.25951°E
- Country: India
- State: West Bengal
- District: Darjeeling

Population (2011)
  - Total: 1,633

Languages
  - Official: Nepali, English
- Time zone: UTC+5:30 (IST)
- Vehicle registration: WB
- Website: wb.gov.in

Pattabong Tea Garden (also spelled Puttabong) is a village in the Darjeeling Pulbazar CD block in the Darjeeling Sadar subdivision of the Darjeeling district in the state of West Bengal, India.

== Geography ==
=== Tea estate ===
Puttabong Tea Estate is one of the largest tea gardens in Darjeeling with an area under tea plantation of 4.37 km^{2} (2 sq mi) while the gross area is 8.92 km^{2} (3 sq mi).

=== Area overview ===
The map alongside shows the northern portion of the Darjeeling Himalayan hill region. Kangchenjunga, which rises with an elevation of 8,586 metres (28,169 ft) is located further north of the area shown.Sandakphu, rising to a height of 3,665 metres (12,024 ft), on the Singalila Ridge, is the highest point in West Bengal. In Darjeeling Sadar subdivision 61% of the total population lives in the rural areas and 39% of the population lives in the urban areas. There are 78 tea gardens/ estates (the figure varies slightly according to different sources), producing and largely exporting Darjeeling tea in the district. It engages a large proportion of the population directly/ indirectly. Some tea gardens were identified in the 2011 census as census towns or villages. Such places are marked in the map as CT (census town) or R (rural/ urban centre). Specific tea estate pages are marked TE.

Note: The map alongside presents some of the notable locations in the subdivision. All places marked in the map are linked in the larger full screen map.

== Demographics ==
According to the 2011 Census of India, Pattabong Tea Garden had a total population of 2,347 of which 1,137 (48%) were males and 1,210 (52%) were females. There were 153 persons in the age range of 0 to 6 years. The total number of literate people in Pattagong Tea Garden was 2,012 (85.73% of the population over 6 years).

As of 2001 India census, Puttabong Tea Estate had a population of 1633. Males constituted 49% of the population and females 51%. Puttabong Tea Estate has an average literacy rate of 75%, higher than the national average of 59.5%: male literacy is 84%, and female literacy is 66%. In Puttabong Tea Estate, 8% of the population is under 6 years of age.

== Notable persons ==
Phiroj Shyangden. Songwriter, singer, guitarist, composer. Former founding member of 1974 AD and The Original Duo.
