= Kandara (band) =

Nepali music group

Kandara कन्दरा
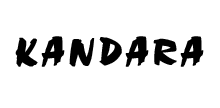
- Kandara Logo

Background information
- Also known as: Kandara Band
- Origin: Pokhara, Nepal
- Genres: Folk pop, Soft rock
- Years active: 1992–present
- Labels: Ranjana Cassete, Santana Records, Stereo Records
- Members: Bivek Shrestha (Vocalist); Sunil Thapa (Drum); Dev Lama (Guitar); Pankaj Jha (Bass); Avinash Gayak (Percussion); Umesh Thapa (Keyboard)
- Past members: Buddharaj Bajracharya; Deepak Raj Mulmi; Anand Tajiya; Sunil Bhattachan; Bijay Gurung; Amar Gurung; Sadeep Tulachan
- Website: www.kandaraband.com

Kandara (Nepali: कन्दरा) is a musical band from Nepal. The band was founded in 1992 in Pokhara. The name of the band is derived from the Nepali word Kandara, which means a gorge or cave nestled within remote hills or mountains. The band has released five albums, and their music is of the folk-pop genre. Bivek Shrestha and Sunil Thapa are among the founding members of the band.

== History ==
=== 1990-2000 ===
Kandara was founded in 1992 by the group of adolescents from Pokhara. The band were originally named "24 Carat," but then changed their name to "Kandara". The band's first album was "Chanchale Kanchi," released in 1994. The band gained popularity with the song "Hong Kong Pokhara" from their third album of the same name which released in 1998 and was written by Saru Bhakta Shrestha. The band have released several albums over the course of their career, with songs such as Hong Kong Pokhara, Lekaki Hey Maya, Bhedi Gothaima, Timi Pari Tyo Gauma, Tagaroma Rumal Rakhi, Bichara Ma, and Ke Pahad Ke Terai amongst the band’s most notable works. During the Nepalese Civil War, the band released Ke Pahad, Ke Terai, addressing the theme of unity in diversity.

=== 2000-2025 ===
The band took a long pause from music after the vocalist and co-founder, Bivek Shrestha, moved to the United Kingdom in September 2001. In 2006, the band released the album "Barshaun Pachi," and 10 years later, the band released their most recent album "Bhedi Ghotaima." For their 32nd anniversary, the band released a new song, ‘Hunechha: The Song of Hope’, which was launched by K. P. Sharma Oli then prime minister of Nepal. To mark the occasion, Kandara also began a tour titled "Pahile Ghar Desh, Ani Pardesh," As a part of this tour, they performed in places such as their home town Pokhara, to an audience of 10,000, and in London on 6 January 2025 at the Indigo at The O2.

The band announced its upcoming album, '"Kavis Sanga Kandara"', at an event held in Kathmandu.

== Band members ==
Current band members

Current members of the band are;

- Bivek Shrestha (Vocalist)
- Sunil Thapa (Drum)
- Dev Lama (Guitar)
- Pankaj Jha (Bass)
- Avinash Gayak (Percussion)
- Neil Ghatani (Keyboard)
- Sandesh Muzo (Guitar)
- Simon Tajhya (Sound Engineer)
- Nabin Thapa (Technical Specialist)

Former band members

- Buddharaj Bajracharya
- Deepak Raj Mulmi
- Sunil Bhattachan
- Bijay Gurung
- Amar Gurung
- Sadeep Tulachan

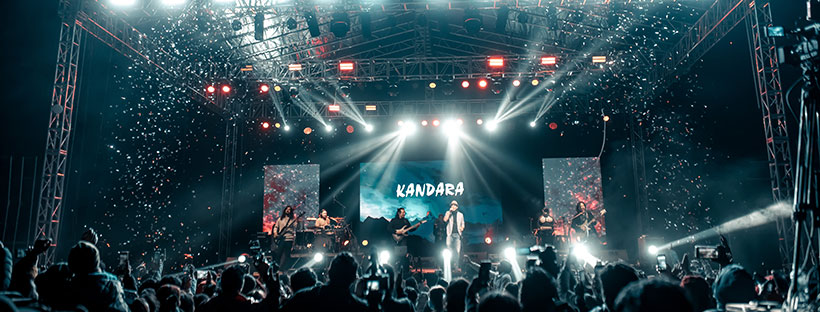
Kandara Concert in Pokhara - 2024

== Musical style ==
Kandara's songs are often referred to as folk-pop, which is a blend of Nepali folk style and pop music. The Band’s musical style also carries elements of mellow soft rock and contemporary pop. The band has collaborated with poets and lyricists including Saru Bhakta Shrestha, Binod Gauchan, and Ramesh Shrestha.

== Discography ==
Year	Album or Single
1994	Chanchale Kanchi (Debut Album)
1996	Danda Pari
1998	Hong Kong Pokhara
2006	Barsau Pachhi
2016	Bhedi Gothaima
2024	Bichara Ma (Single)
2025	Hunechha: The Song of Hope (Single)

== Awards and recognition ==
Year	Category	Award
1995	Winner	Bit Contest
1997	Best Performance by a Group or Duo with Vocal	Hits FM Music Awards
2010	The Best Rock Band award	Hits FM Music Awards
2016	Album of the Year “Bhedi Gothaima”	Hits FM Music Awards

== Concerts ==
Date/Year	Program	Place
1996	Kandara Live	Butwal, Nepal
1990s	Hong Kong shows (iconic connection)	Hong Kong
July 2018	Kandara USA Tour	America
Oct 4, 2024	Return gig	Dharan, Nepal
Nov 9, 2024	Kathmandu Calling Kandara	Kathmandu, Nepal
January-July 2025	Global tour	United Kingdom, Dubai, Japan, Australia/New Zealand, USA/Canada, Europe
Jan 4, 2025	Kandara: Live at Indigo at O2	London, England
Jan 30, 2025	Kandara: Live	Hong Kong
March-April, 2025	Nepal Festival 2025	Australia

== See also ==
- Music of Nepal
- Nepathya
