= Naresh Bhattarai =

Nepalese media personality

- Born: Lok Darshan; 26 February 1978 (age 48); Sarlahi, Nepal
- Occupations: Lyricist, Radio Personality, Presenter, Producer, Actor
- Years active: 1996–present
- Spouse: Muna Karki Bhattarai(2009–present)
- Parent(s): Ratna Manjari Bhattarai; Tulasi Prasad Bhattarai
- Website: nareshbhattarai.com.np

Naresh Bhattarai (Nepali: नरेश भट्टराई) (born 26 February), is a media personality, Chairman of Jay hos Media, Senior Radio Journalist, TV program producer, presenter from 1996 and popular lyricist with more than 300 songs recorded. Also, recognized script writer, actor who has contributed to numerous television commercials, feature films and music videos.

Acknowledged as ‘Voice of Nepal’ for being one of the most popular media personality. Awarded as the busiest Emcee for the year 2014 (for hosting the highest number stage shows and ceremonies) and Emcee of the year 2016.

== Media career ==
=== Senior program producer & presenter ===
==== Radio ====
- Image FM 97.9 : 2002 to till date
1. Subha Din (the breakfast show)
2. Cinema Bazar (Nepali Film Review show)
3. Show Case (Nepali Film Review show)

==== Television ====
- Terai Television (TTV) : 2009 to 2016
1. Love and Life (talk show that features respected and popular figures )
2. Entertainment Weekly’ (EW) (full-fledged entertainment show )
3. Shake Hands - Personal Reconnect Show
- Prime Times HD : 2020 to 2023 : "Mero Eauta Sathi chha"
- Prime Times HD : 2024 to till date : "Mero Eauta Sathi chha Reloaded "
- AP1 HD : 2019 : "Nepal Lok Star "
- Jay Hos Media : "Chiyapaan with Naresh" : 2019 to till date
- Image khabar : "The Evening Guff With Naresh"
- Galaxy 4K: Intra Foundation's MERO DANCE CUP USA 2022 ( Dance Reality Show ): 2022 to till date
- NTV plus: Mero Dance Universe 2023 ( Nepal's First International dance reality show) : 2023 to till date

== Career ==
- Program presenter at Image Channel, 2009 -2010
- Program presenter for Nepal’s first News FM, Image News FM 103.6, 2008 to 2010
- Acted as a model for numerous Television Commercials since 2007
- Lead actor for mega serial ‘Gahana’, 2005
- Acted in more than 12 feature films in various roles since 2005
- Program Presenter for FM Adhyatma Jyoti 100 MHz, 1996
- Program coordinator and presenter, Image FM 100 MHz, 1997-1999
- Program coordinator and presenter, Classic FM 100 MHz, 1999-2002
- Program presenter for first ever dance reality show ‘Aagan’ in "Nepal Television", 1999-2004
- Acted in many music videos as an artist since 2002

== Solo albums ==
- Haraf
- Height

== Discography ==
=== As a lyricist ===
- Timi Nai Hau
- Kati Maya
- Mann Nai Timro Badaliyasi
- Selly I Love You
- Dil Ko Dhoka
- Mann Mero Mann
- Hey Maya
- Timi Nai Hau Priye
- Aafnai Chhaya Le
- Kehi Kura Ma Bhaanchhu
- Duniya Yastai Rahechha
- Jay Shree Ram
- Jalay Ma Jalay
- Soltini
- Maile Jati Maya
- Ma ta Sojhi Sojhi
- Shiraima Shirbandi
- Lamo Bato
- Kina Aattinu

=== As an actor ===
- "Bato ko kaada"
- "Naboli Jitchhau Timi"
- "Jhan Jhan Maya Badyo"
- "Timro Yaad Bhulauna"
- "Timilai Hongkong purayo"
- "Nisturile Chhadera gai hali"

=== As a Poet ===
- Ma Achel prem maa pareko chu
- Lockdown Zindagi
- K herera baschau ajhai
- Timi ta neta bhayechau
- Sansarei jitna sakchu ma timi sangha harchu ma
- Ma sakchu jitna harek baji

== Script Writer ==
Film
Bobby

=== As lyricist ===
Song(s)	Film
Sang Sangai Bachna Pau	Lekhanta
Kasle Choryo Mero Mann	Kismat
Na Kunai Bandhan	The Yug Dekhi Yug Samma
Timi Matra Timi	Timi Matra Timi
Basma Chaina Yo Mann	Basma Chaina Yo Mann
Bandha Na Bandha Malai	Dhoowa yo Nasha
Uttarai Bagne	Mero Jeewan Sathi
Ae Hajur	Bhagawan Sabai ko
Mero Dhadkan	Don
Badnaam	Albida
Jaba Samma Chhau Mero Saath	Hitler
"Lade Lade"	Timi Sanga
Udyo Mann	Blind Rocks
Mahasush	Blind Rocks
Susta Yo	Happy Days
Yo ta maya ho	Kaira

== Awards ==
- "Voice of Nepal" awarded by Kalash Events in the year 2014
- "Best Lyricist" award for the song in feature film "Dhoowa yo Nasha" in the year 2013
- "Film Journalist Award 2008" by "Film Journalist Association of Nepal"
- "Youth Ambassador for Peace" by Youth Federation for World Peace in 2008
- "Popular Emcee of the Year 2014" by Box office film club
- "Emcee of the Year 2016" by 1st Nepali Music Video Award, UAE
- "Best Lyricist" award for the song "Su swagatam" sung by Anil Singh, awarded by 3rd Nepali Music Video Award 2018, Malaysia
- "National Film Journalism Award 2075" by Film Journalist Association Nepal ( चलचित्र पत्रकार संघ नेपालबाट "राष्ट्रिय चलचित्र पत्रकारिता सम्मान २०७५" )
- "Special Award" awarded by 10th NEFTA Film Awards 2077
- "Sarlahi Golden Honor 2077" from Barhathwa Municipality (बरहथवा नगरपालिकाबाट "सर्लाही स्वर्णिम सम्मान २०७७")
- "Iconic TV Personality" Fashion and Model Award 2022 by "Pageant Nepal International"
- "बिन्ध्यवासिनी कला पत्रकारिता सम्मान २०७९ " by "बिन्ध्यवासिनी म्युजिक अवार्ड २०७९"
- "Special Honor 2080" by "Reporters Club Nepal "
- "Versatile Media Personality 2024" 2nd AMS International Honor & Award Japan 2080 by "AMS"
