= Karna Das =

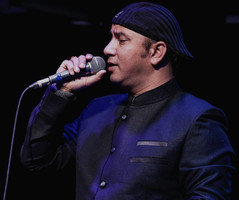
- Karna Das performing in Melbourne, Australia in 2016.

Background information
- Born: Karna Das Pariyar; 24 November 1974 (age 51); Sub-Metropolitan-15, Pokhara, Kaski District, Nepal
- Occupations: Musician, singer, lyricist, composer, record producer
- Instruments: Vocals, piano, guitar, bass guitar, pen
- Years active: 1997–present
- Labels: Samjhana Audio Video (SAV), Ranjana Music, Music Nepal, Believe Music

Karna Das (Nepali: कर्ण दास; born 24 November 1974 in Pokhara, Nepal), is a Nepali musician, singer, songwriter, lyricist, composer, and record producer. Das is regarded as the "living legend" of the Nepali music landscape. He is revered for his soothing and melodious timbre and also for his distinct songwriting attributed with immense depth and earnestness. His lyrics spans topics such as philosophical and existential issues of mankind, perseverance, overcoming ordeals, lamentation, hope, anti-fatalism, and patriotism.

He completed high school in 1993, completed his Intermediate of Arts (IA) in Education, and studied economics in college. Das was the lead vocalist of the band Madhyanha ("Central Point"). He began his singing career in 1997 with the band's first song, "Jindagi Ko Ke Bharosa". Drawing inspiration from the Indian poet Nida Fazli, from his poem "Jindagi Kya Hai Chalta Firta", Das had drafted the song when he was studying in grade 9. He furnished his own composition and vocals into the song and refined it after incorporating constructive feedback from his mother. The band released the song in its final form when Das was 20. "Jindagi Ko Ke Bharosa", became an instant cult classic among the Nepalese populace and continues to be cherished hitherto. Das recalls in his church congregation in Pokhara, he would explain the crux of his song, that our life lived out on purely materialistic grounds is fragile and limited. The implication, therefore, he points, is to make life count by seeking what is lasting and deviating from immorality.

Das plays piano, guitar, and bass guitar. His musical inspirations include Elton John, Richard Marx, Scorpions, Michael Jackson, Gulam Ali of Pakistan, Lata Mangeshkar and the Ghazal singer Jagjit Singh of India, and Narayan Gopal of Nepal.

Das makes rare appearances in commercial and popular media.

== Early life ==
Das was born in Pokhara, Nepal and raised in an art-loving, and musical Christian home. He is the only son and has an elder and a younger sister. His father played Tabla and was a singer, but could not continue the music after he joined the Indian Army. His mother Ratna Devi Das was a professional dancer. She was a chorus line dancer, and also performed alongside the Bollywood actress Mala Sinha, in the 1966 Nepali movie, Maitighar.

Das was educated in Sunday School in his Church in Pokhara from early childhood to adolescence where he garnered his moral and musical lessons. Growing up in a Christian home, music was intimately part of the family, as they sang and played Christian hymns, gospels, and worship songs. Das learned the fundamentals of music in his church while singing in the choir. He recalls as a young 12-year-old, he was gifted by his mother, his first acoustic guitar, and was encouraged to pursue music. He was given guitar lessons by a guitar teacher named Manish Tamang in his village. Observing Das's incessant love for music and his promising talent, his mother nudged him into a disciplined musical learning path, grooming and guiding young Das.

In the milieu of Nepal's bucolic livelihood, raising and shepherding cattle and sheep were part of Das's regular chore. He recalls the only medium for music in his village was the radio. As a teenager, the first western music Das got antiquated to was Holiday by the German rock band Scorpions, which grabbed him in astonishment. He was soon into sentimental and melodious English tunes shared with him by his friend Arjun. Das was fascinated by Elton John songs, and hits of Michael Jackson such as Earth Song, and Heal The World.

As Das's father joined the Indian Army, the family moved to New Delhi where Das was introduced to Indian songs. He craved for lyrically strong music and that was beyond merely psychologically pleasure-inducing. His inspiration met with Pakistani singer Gulam Ali, and the Indian Ghazal giant Jagdish Singh. Das was particularly touched by the Urdu lexicon and poetry, which was distinctly soaked with sentiment and meaning, and had a wide gamut of diverse and subtle connotations. Das wanted to emulate this aspect of Eastern language through Nepali songwriting and vocabulary.

By the time Das was a young adult, he had already garnered a holistic taste for western, Indian, and Nepali songs that especially packed meaningful depth and sentiment. Moreover, he also attributes his study of the Bible and philosophical books which gave him the perspective for life's reality that would influence his writings. At the age of 19, he began percolating his experience into carving and drafting original words and melodies simultaneously. Musical connoisseurs in Nepal often state that Das "took the Nepali musical scene by storm, through his beautiful, soul-stirring, and powerful music."

== Personal life ==
He is married to Sima Das. He has 3 sons, of which the eldest Markus Das manages a recording studio in Pokhara. Currently, two of his eldest sons reside and study in Sydney. Besides musical engagements, Karna Das owns and manages an organic farm in his hometown in Pokhara.

During, the thick of the civil war in Nepal waged under the Maoist insurgency, Das in the early 2000s, released a couple of albums targeting the listeners of the war-stuck nation. Through his music, he asked his listeners to persist in their hope, and bolster their perseverance until everyone meets the impending light at the end of the tunnel. To the then bastions of power through his songs, he urged that the struggle of Nepalese was not merely for the radical changes in power structures, but for the grassroots upliftment of people's lives and livelihoods. An example is evinced in the song "Thula Thula Mahal" which among others, voices Nepalese preference for tiny huts that imparts vocation and education rather than tall indifferent urban complexes. Other imperatives in the same song include statements with contrasting negations, such as, "give me a field of crops, over a battlefield; a pen that draws ink, over a sword that draws blood; a pair of hands that give, over a pair of talkative lips; and a sage that imparts wisdom, over a Jogi that begs."

"Thula Thula Mahal" was appreciated so pervasively that even Maoist cadres themselves mailed personal hand-written letters of appreciation to Karna Das during the insurgency.

In 2005, Das took a decade-long hiatus from the musical activity in Nepal, during which he resided in Baltimore city, in the U.S. state of Maryland. The aftermath of April 2015 Nepal earthquake, invoked the urgency for ensuring the well-being of his family, thus he repatriated. Assessing in retrospect, Das considers his life's journey including the hiatus as carefully planned and worked out by God. He considers the almighty pulled him through the highs and lows with a purpose — to teach Das life lessons of immense significance, and to seep in him deeper perspective into reality, which he would not have garnered otherwise. As of now, he is glad to be reunited and to cherish love, with his family and grown children. In 2016, he resumed his music in Nepal, and catering to his life-long fans, released the album "Euta Naya Asha" (A New Hope).

Das is a devoted Christian.

== Concerts ==
Year	Venue	Notes
1997	Basundhara Park, Lakeside, Pokhara, Nepal	"Machapuchre Utsav Music Contest". The event marks the debut of Karna Das & his band Madhyanha. They won the contest.
1998	Dharan, Sunsari, Nepal	Special Contribution of gospel song.
1998	Sunsari, Nepal	Special appearance as a singer at a beauty pageant.
2001	Hong Kong	Performed among Nepalese and British Gurkhas living in Hong Kong on the occasion of Nepalese New Year.
2001	Pokhara, Nepal	Performed for the recognition of the City of Pokhara.
2001	Komogane, Nogano, Japan	Performed for the recognition of the City of Pokhara.
2002	Tokyo, Japan	Performed for Nepalese working & living in Tokyo, Japan.
2003	London, UK	Performed for Nepalese and British Gurkha living in the UK.
2003	Bangkok, Thailand	Performed for Burmese of Nepali origin living in Thailand.
2003	Doha, Qatar	Performed in Doha, Qatar alongside other artists from Nepal.
2004	London, UK	"Karna Das Night". First solo concert among 1200, organized by Yeti Sanjh” in London UK.
2005	Pokhara, Nepal	“Karna Das Night”. Fundraiser event to establish a medical polyclinic in Pokhara.
2006	Pokhara, Nepal	“Karna Das Night”. Fundraiser concert for the landslide victims of mid-western Nepal.
02 - 05 Sep, 2009	Boston, USA	"Karna Das in Boston"
26 Dec, 2015	City Hall, Pokhara, Nepal	"Karna Das back again after 10 years - Live in Pokhara". Fundraiser concert for reconstruction of earthquake affected schools, organised by the Lions Club of Pokhara, Adarsha Chautari.
06 Dec, 2014	Akron, Ohio, USA	"Live Gospel Concert at Akron, Ohio"
03 Jun, 2017	Red Capsicum Restaurant and Function Centre, Rockdale, Sydney, Australia	"Karna Das Australia Tour". Fundraiser concert for INF's Green Pastures Hospital in Pokhara.
10 Jun, 2017	St Luke's Anglican Church, Liverpool, Sydney, Australia	"Karna Das Australia Tour". Fundraiser concert for INF's Green Pastures Hospital in Pokhara.
29 Jun, 2018	Ilam, Nepal	"Province 1 Youth Festival - An Evening with Karna Das"
NA	Hong Kong	Performed among four thousand at the Beauty Pageant Concert in Hong Kong.
NA	Jersey City, New Jersey, USA	Sister Cities Singing Ceremony
NA	Japan	6th Rodhi Saanjh in Japan.

== Awards and recognition ==
During the pre-90s, virtually all artists of Nepal made their debut through the state-owned radio station - Radio Nepal. The in-house music department screened the candidates, validated their technical abilities, and supported them with record production and broadcast. With the advent of private stations in the 90s, budding artists gained broader options to garner appraisal of their work. Awards from Hits FM and Image FM were considered premium accolades for Nepali musicians. Nepali Times, an English weekly stated "...[these awards] are widely regarded as the most representative Nepali awards: the people decide on the nominees, and an independent panel of judges culled from the pillars of Nepali music make the final selection".

Das has won over two dozen awards since 1997. He has bagged consecutive awards in the categories such as 'best composition', 'best performance', and 'best male voice'.

Year (AD)	Nepali Year (BS)	Host	Award	Notes
1997	2054	Machhapuchre Music	Best Band, Best Vocal, and Best Lyrics	for the song "Jindagi Ko Ke Bharosa"
1997	2054	Carlsberg Music	Best Vocal & Best Lyrics	for the song "Jindagi Ko Ke Bharosa"
1998	2055	Hits FM	Hits FM Music Award - Record of the Year	for the song "Jindagi Ko Ke Bharosa"
1998	2055	Hits FM	Hits FM Music Award - Best Performance by Group or Duo	for the song "Jindagi Ko Ke Bharosa"
1999	2056	Hits FM	Hits FM Music Award - Best Performance by Group or Duo	for the song "Anoutho Byatha Bhaecha"
2001	2058	Sanmigal Music	Best Male Vocal (Pop)	for the song "Eklo Raat"
2001	2058	Hits FM	Hits FM Music Award - Best Male Vocal Performance	for the song "Byarthai Feri"
2002	2059	Hits FM	Hits FM Music Award - Best Male Vocal Performance	for the song "Janmida Eklai"
2002	2059	Machhapuchre FM	Best Male Vocal Performance	for the song "Soonsaan Raat"
2002	2059	Machhapuchre FM	Best Song of the Year	for the song "Bisataari Chaayo"
2003	2060	JCI Nepal ( Jaycees)	Youth of the Year	in Arts
2003	2060	Boston College of London	Longtime Outstanding Nepalese Singer	International Award
2003	2060	Hits FM	Hits FM Music Award - Best Male Vocal Performance	for the song "Timro Mero Sambandhako"
2003	2060	Hits FM	Hits FM Music Award - Record of the Year	for the song "Thula Thula Mahal Hoina"
2004	2061	Image FM 97.9	6th Annual Image Award 2060 BS - Best Male Vocal Performance	for the song "Ma Mareko Chaina"
2005	2062	Chinnalata Music	Melodious Voice of the Year	
2005	2062	Hits FM	The 7th Close-Up Hits FM Music Award - Best Composition	for the song "Pradesh Bata"
2005	2062	Hits FM	Hits FM Music Award - Best Male Vocal Performance	for the song "Pradesh Bata"
2006	2063	Image FM 97.9	Best Vocal Performance	

== Discography ==
Release year	Album title	Album Type	Label
1997	Madhyanha - 1	Studio	
1998	Madhyanha - 2	Studio	Ranjana Music Industries Pvt. Ltd.
2000	Bhetiyera Feri	Studio	
2001	Madhyanha - 3	Studio	
2003	Purano Dunga	Studio	Music Nepal
May 9, 2005	Aadha Sapana	Studio	Samjhana Audio Video (SAV)
2007	Preet	Studio	
2008	Best Of Madhyanna	Compilation	Ranjana Music Industries Pvt. Ltd.
September 23, 2016	Euta Naya Aasha	Studio	Music Nepal
