= Adrian Pradhan =

Indian Nepali-language singer and composer

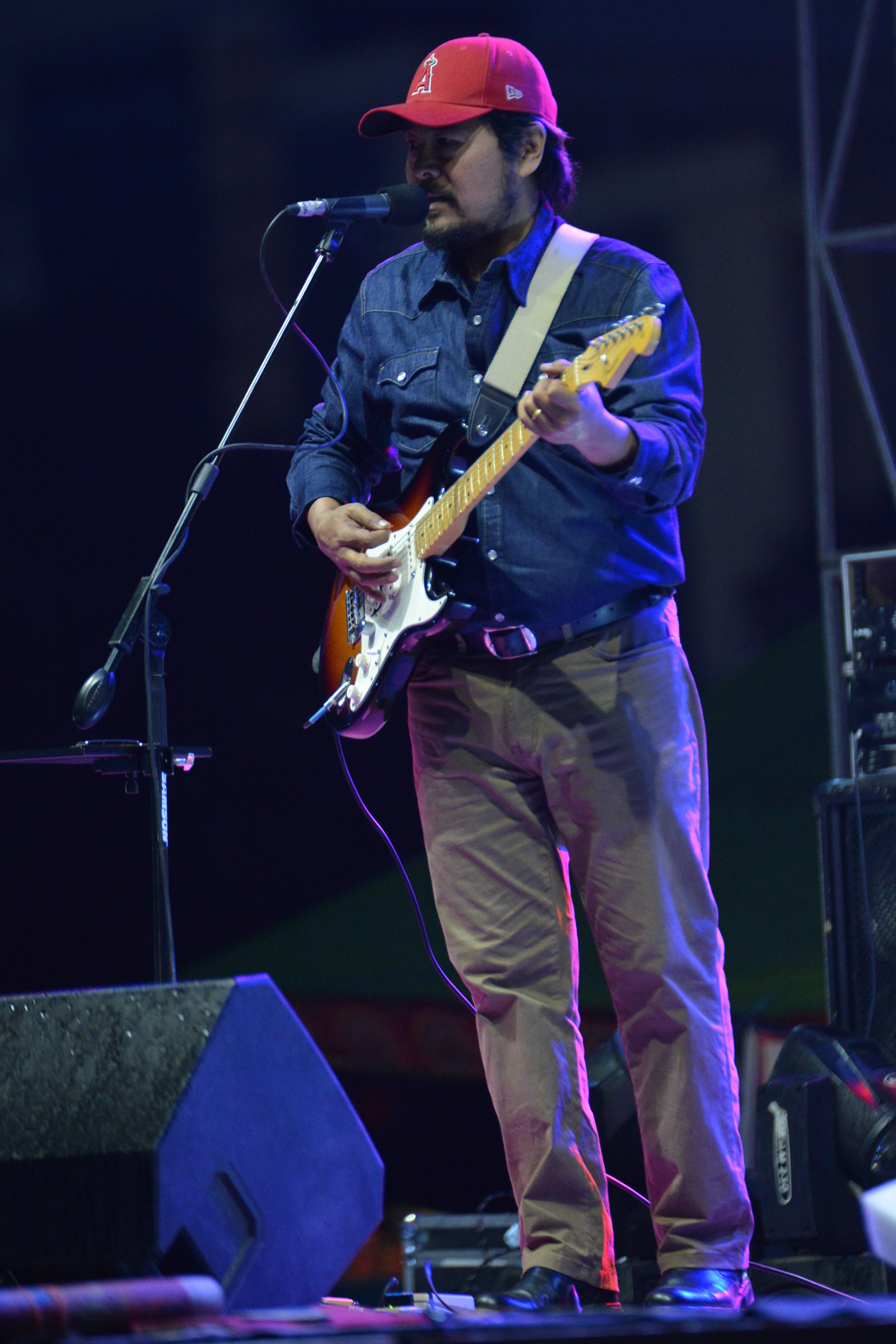
- Adrian Pradhan at Khadgi Mahotsav 2075 (2019)

Background information
- Born: Kalimpong, West Bengal, India
- Genres: Rock; Nepalese folk rock
- Occupations: Musician; vocalist; drummer
- Instrument: Guitar
- Member of: 1974 AD (1994–2015, 2019–present)
- Formerly of: Eurika; Flames; Adrian Pradhan & friends (2016–2019)

Adrian Pradhan (born 18 August) is a Nepalese vocalist, composer and songwriter. He was born and raised in Kalimpong, West Bengal, India. He is the lead member of the Nepali rock band 1974 AD. Pradhan was the lead vocalist of the band until March 2015, after which he was replaced by Rohit John Chhetri. Pradhan reunited with the band in 2019 and has been associated with 1974 AD since.

== Early life ==
Pradhan's musical journey started during his school years at St. Augustine's School, Kalimpong, where he was a member of the school choir. The mouth organ and keyboard were his first instruments and he picked up the guitar in the year 1989 and switched to drums in the year 1995. His first band was Eurika where the foundation of a musical career was laid. Later he was involved with the band Flames which toured India.

== With 1974 AD ==
Pradhan joined 1974 AD in 1994 as a pianist. Along with fellow band-member Phiroj Shyangden, he was the front man of the band and did the vocals, played the drums and harmonica.

== The Original Duo ==
In 2016 Pradhan reunited once again with former 1974 AD band member Phiroj Shyangden under the name 'The Original Duo'. They toured five states in USA in 2016. alongside Nepal, UK, and Australia in 2017-18.

== Albums ==
- Adrian Pradhan discography (solo)

Album name	Year released
Aaja	2002
Ballads	2006
Janani	2008
Saath	2011
Khoosi	2013
Abhiwaadan	2015

- Adrian Pradhan discography (with 1974 AD)

Album name	Year released
Time Out	1996
Samjhi Baschhu	1998
Satabdi	2001
Jungi Nishan	2002
Limited Edition	2002
Pinjada Ko Suga	2004
On Air	2007
Aath Athara	2010
Nirantarta	2019

== See also ==
- Navneet Aditya Waiba
- Phiroj Shyangden
- 1974 AD
