= Hataarindai, Bataasindai =

2019 single by Sajjan Raj Vaidya

- Cover art of the single

Single by Sajjan Raj Vaidya
- Language: Nepali
- Released: 1 January 2019
- Genre: Indie
- Length: 5:30
- Songwriter: Sajjan Raj Vaidya

Music video
- "Hataarindai, Bataasindai" on YouTube

Hataarindai, Bataasindai (Nepali: हतारिंदै, बतासिंदै) is a single by the Nepali independent musical artist Sajjan Raj Vaidya. It was released on 01 January 2019. It has a soulful touch of Sarangi played by Shyam Nepali.

== Background ==
The artist claims the song to have been inspired by the perspective of a close friend. The lyrics of the song portray a story of romance where the protagonist is seemingly conversing with his loved one while contemplating their love story. Throughout the song, the character voicing the story reassures his lover of his constant efforts towards their union and informs her that he is rushing and speeding to arrive where she is.

The song explores various genres and fuses together traditional Nepali folk instruments with instruments generally used in modern Western music. It features a bridge accompanied by a Sarangi, played by Shyam Nepali.

== Music video ==
The music video for the single was one of the factors that contributed to the song's popularity. Directed by Nurbu Lama, the story line features a heterosexual couple and a homosexual couple. The individual stories of each couple are presented parallel to each other, leading up to the main part of the video where the homosexual couple are revealed as they unite with each other. Later on, the two couples cross paths as the video comes to a close.

The cinematographer seems to have intended to initially conceal the fact that there are two different couples involved, with each of the couples only revealed later on in the video as separate. The "twist" of the story is presented as the homosexual couple kissing, and the video later on sees the couple cross paths. The video aims to address LGBTQ rights as it establishes both the homosexual couple and the heterosexual couple as normal.

The artist has targeted the Nepali community as the main audience for the video. "We wanted the video to address the inherent problem of the Nepali community - people avoiding confrontation and their reluctance to communicate. We decided that the under representation of the LGBTQ community in Nepal was an important issue that needed to be addressed, and that is how the video came about."

After the video was released, many Nepalis, including members of the LGBTIQ community, took to social media to express their appreciation.

== Release History ==
Country	Date	Label
Worldwide	01 January 2019	Sajjan Raj Vaidya

== Production ==
- Writer/ Composer / Producer: Sajjan Raj Vaidya
- Sarangi: Shyam Nepali
- Director / Screenplay: Nurbu Lama
- Cinematography: Nurbu Lama, Tsewang Rinzin
- Editing: Nurbu Lama, Abhinav Bhatta, Saumya Karki
- Actors: Jonsai Thapa, Arhant Shrestha, Ila Lama, Abhinav Bhatta
- Production Manager: Arogya Khadka
