= Radio Nepal =

Public radio broadcaster of Nepal

Radio Nepal रेडियो नेपाल
- Type: Public broadcasting
- Country: Nepal
- Broadcast area: National and international
- Headquarters: Singha Durbar, Kathmandu, Nepal

Programming
- Affiliations: World Radio Network

Ownership
- Owner: Government of Nepal
- Key people: Dr. Mahendra Bista (Chairman; Bishnu Ram Neupane (Acting Chief Administrative Officer)

History
- Founded: 2 April 1951 (75 years ago)
- Launch date: 2 April 1951

Coverage
- Availability: International

Links
- Webcast: www.radionepal.gov.np onlineradionepal.gov.np
- Website: www.radionepal.gov.np

Radio Nepal (Nepali: रेडियो नेपाल) is the state-owned radio broadcasting organisation of Nepal. It was established on 2 April 1951. Radio Nepal airs programs on shortwave, medium wave (AM) and FM frequencies.

Regular broadcasts consume sixteen hours every day, including two hours of regional broadcasts. Public holidays feature an additional two hours. FM Kathmandu, the first FM channel covering Kathmandu Valley and adjoining areas, was started in 1995 in Singha Durbar, Kathmandu.

On 19 May 2016, the environmentally-themed song "Melancholy" was recorded by 365 Nepali singers and musicians in a single day at the Radio Nepal studio.

In 2016 Radio Nepal had six medium wave relay stations, one shortwave relay station, and 20 FM relay stations. Broadcasts are available online. Radio Nepal broadcasts six different programs from satellite.

In 2024, Radio Nepal airing on these medium wave (MW/AM) frequencies; 576 kHz, 648 kHz, 1143 kHz, 810 kHz, 684 kHz, and 792 kHz.

Transmission coverage of the MW transmitters is able to reach the 80 and 90% of the population of nation.

In 2025 Radio Nepal had 35 FM relay stations.

== History ==
In 1951, Radio Prajatantra was transferred to Kathmandu at Singha Durbar by Tarini Prasad Koirala, where it took the name Radio Nepal and started regular broadcasting on April 2, 1951. A 250-watt short-wave transmitter was used. Initially, daily transmission lasted 4 hours and 30 minutes.

On April 2, 1994, regional centers began regional broadcasting services.

The Radio Nepal Broadcasting Act was enacted in 2014.

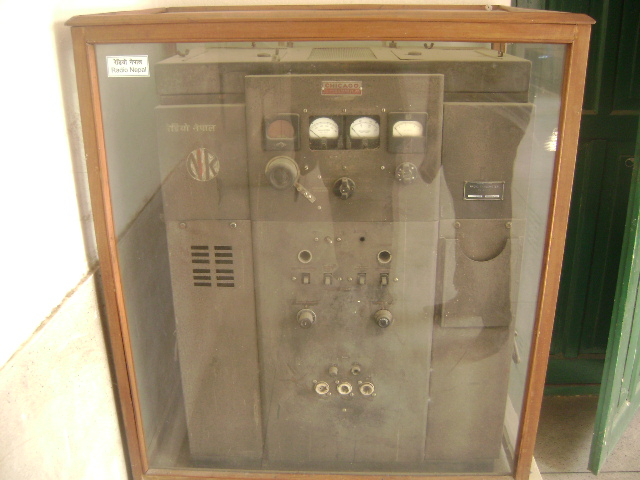
Radio Nepal's first Transmission Device

== Stations ==
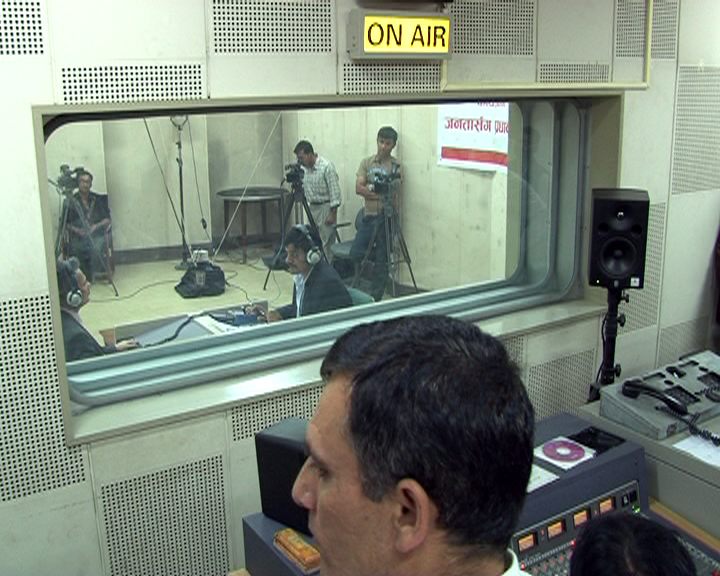
Inside a Radio Nepal studio during a live talk show

Coverage map of Radio Nepal

Transmission Network of Radio Nepal
Provinces	Station	Service Type	Frequency
Province no. 1	Dharan, Sunsari	MW	648 kHz
Province no. 1	Pattale, Solukhumbu	FM	98 MHz
Province no. 1	Bhedetar, Sunsari	FM	100 MHz
Province no. 1	Aitabare, Ilam	FM	103 MHz
Madhesh Province	Bardibas, Mahottari	MW	1143 kHz
Madhesh Province	Bardibas, Mahottari	FM	103 MHz
Madhesh Province	Jitpur, Bara	FM	103 MHz
Bagmati Province	Singhadurbar, Kathmandu	Station	
Bagmati Province	Bhaisepati, Lalitpur	MW	792 kHz
Bagmati Province	Khumaltar, Lalitpur	FM	100 MHz
Bagmati Province	Simbhanjayang, Makawanpur	FM	100 MHz
Bagmati Province	Charikot, Dolakha	FM	100 MHz
Gandaki Province	Pokhara, Kaski	MW	684 kHz
Gandaki Province	Pokhara, Kaski	FM	100 MHz
Gandaki Province	Daunne, Nawalparasi	FM	103 MHz
Gandaki Province	Jomsom, Mustang	FM	100 MHz
Gandaki Province	Resunga, Gulmi	FM	100 MHz
Gandaki Province	Bandipur, Tanahun	FM	100 MHz
Lumbini Province	Dang Station	FM	98 MHz
Lumbini Province	Rolpa Station	FM	103 MHz
Karnali Province	Surkhet Station	MW	576 kHz
Karnali Province	Humla Station	FM	100 MHz
Karnali Province	Jumla Station	FM	103 MHz
Karnali Province	Manwa Station	FM	100 MHz
Karnali Province	Mugu Station	FM	100 MHz
Karnali Province	Dolpa Station	FM	103 MHz
Karnali Province	Harre Station	FM	100 MHz
Sudurpaschim Province	Dipayal Station	MW	810 kHz
Sudurpaschim Province	Buditola Station	FM	103 MHz
Sudurpaschim Province	Uditola Station	FM	100 MHz
Sudurpaschim Province	Khodape Station	FM	98 MHz
Sudurpaschim Province	Darchula Station	FM	98 MHz
Sudurpaschim Province	Bajhang Station	FM	103 MHz

== Gallery ==
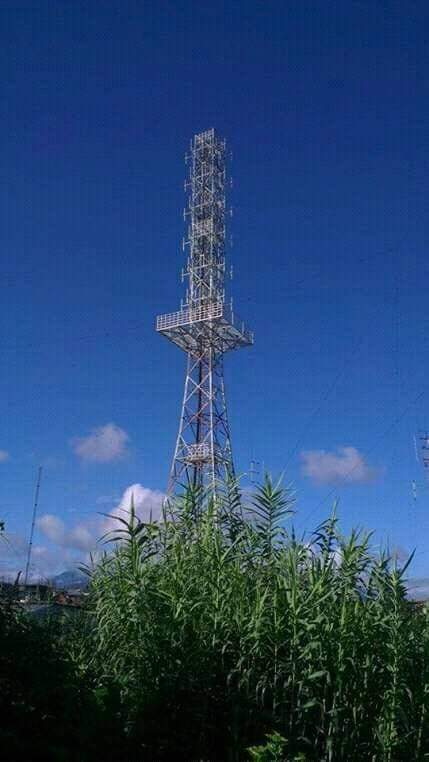
Tower at Khumaltar, Lalitpur

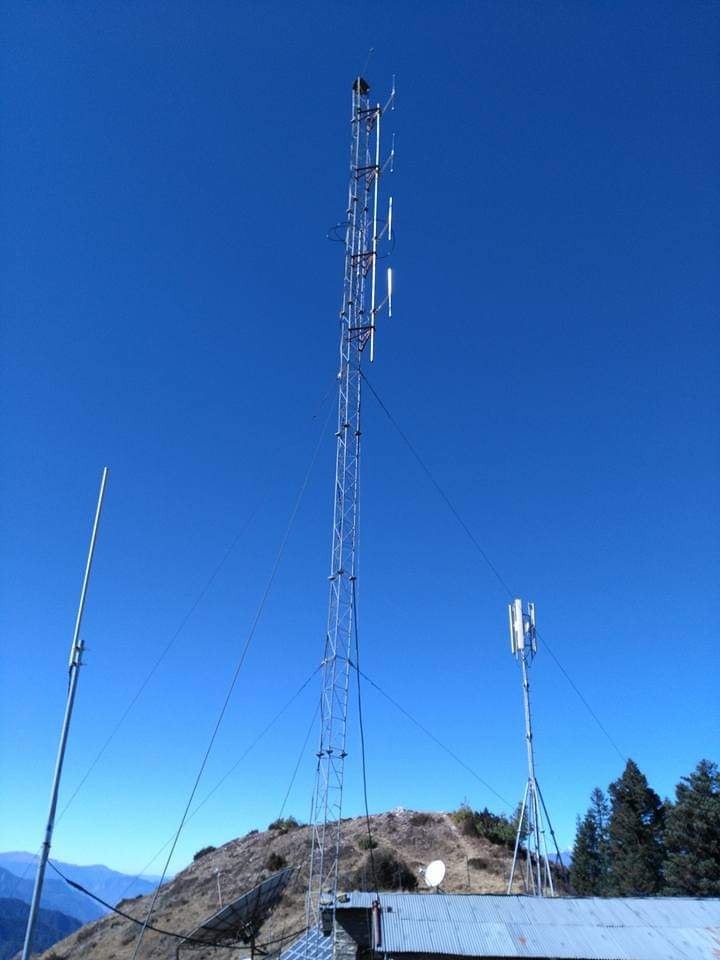
Tower at Murmatop

== Development of Nepali songs and music ==
Radio Nepal has been producing and presenting songs and music of different genres in different languages spoken in Nepal since its establishment for the national integrity and upliftment of Nepali art and culture. In order to present the wanted songs by the listeners, Radio Nepal also organizes modern song competitions from 1965. From Narayan Gopal, Bhaktaraj Acharya, Deep Shrestha to Ram Krishna Dhakal, Anju Panta, Danney Noraula, Shiva Pariyar have been grown from Radio Nepal. Likewise, Kiran Kharel, Ratnashamser Thapa, and Kaliparsad Rijal from the old generation to the lyricists Ramesh Dahal, Mahesh Acharya, Rajkumar Bagar, Ramesh Chhitiz, Ramesh Paudel started and have been grown from Radio Nepal.

== Modern Song Competition ==
The Modern Song Competition is organised by Radio Nepal. Past winners are:

2025: Hom Neupane (Best Lyrics), Chandi Prasad Kafle (Best Music Composer), Paresh Rai (Best Singing: First Place), Deepika Shrestha (Best Singing: Second Place) and Purna Bahadur Bishwakarma (Best Singing: Third Place)

2022: Sweta Mainali (best lyrics), Khadga Gandarbha (best music composer) and Mamata Gurung (best singing)

2021: Mahesh Paudel (best lyrics), Ramesh Subedi (best music composer) and Rajkumar Sundas ( Bhojpur) (best singing)

2020: Ramesh Dahal (best lyrics), Shankar Smile Thapa (best music composer) and Shubhash Mandal(best singing)

2017: Padma Likha Magar (best lyrics), Santosh Shrestha (music composition), and CD Bijaya Adhikari (singing)

2016: Prakash KC (best lyrics), Chandan Kumar Shrestha (music composition), and Durga Pariyar (singing)

2015: Prakat Pangeni Shiva (best lyrics), Nabaraj Baral (best music composer)and Menuka Paudel(best singing)

2014: Yogendra Upadhayay (best music composer)

2011: Manisha Pokharel (best singer)

2009: Ramesh Dahal (best lyrics), Sachin Singh, Nisha Deshar (best singer)

2008: Sheetal Kadambini (best lyrics)

2001: Naba Raj Lamsal (best lyricist), Dhading

2000: Bhabesh Bhumari (best lyricist), from Pyuthan district. Danney Noraula (Music composition)

1998: Rajkumar Bagar (best lyrics)

1997: Gyandendra Gadal (best lyricist), from Ilam district

1993: Ramesh Paudel (best lyrics)/Ramesh Khitiz

1987: Buddhabira Lama (best lyricist) from Solukhumbu district

1983: Dinesh Adhikari (best lyrics)

1978: Prakash Shrestha (best singer)

1965: Kiran Kharel (best lyricist), from Kathmandu district.
