= Phiroj Shyangden =

American-Nepali singer, guitarist, composer, songwriter

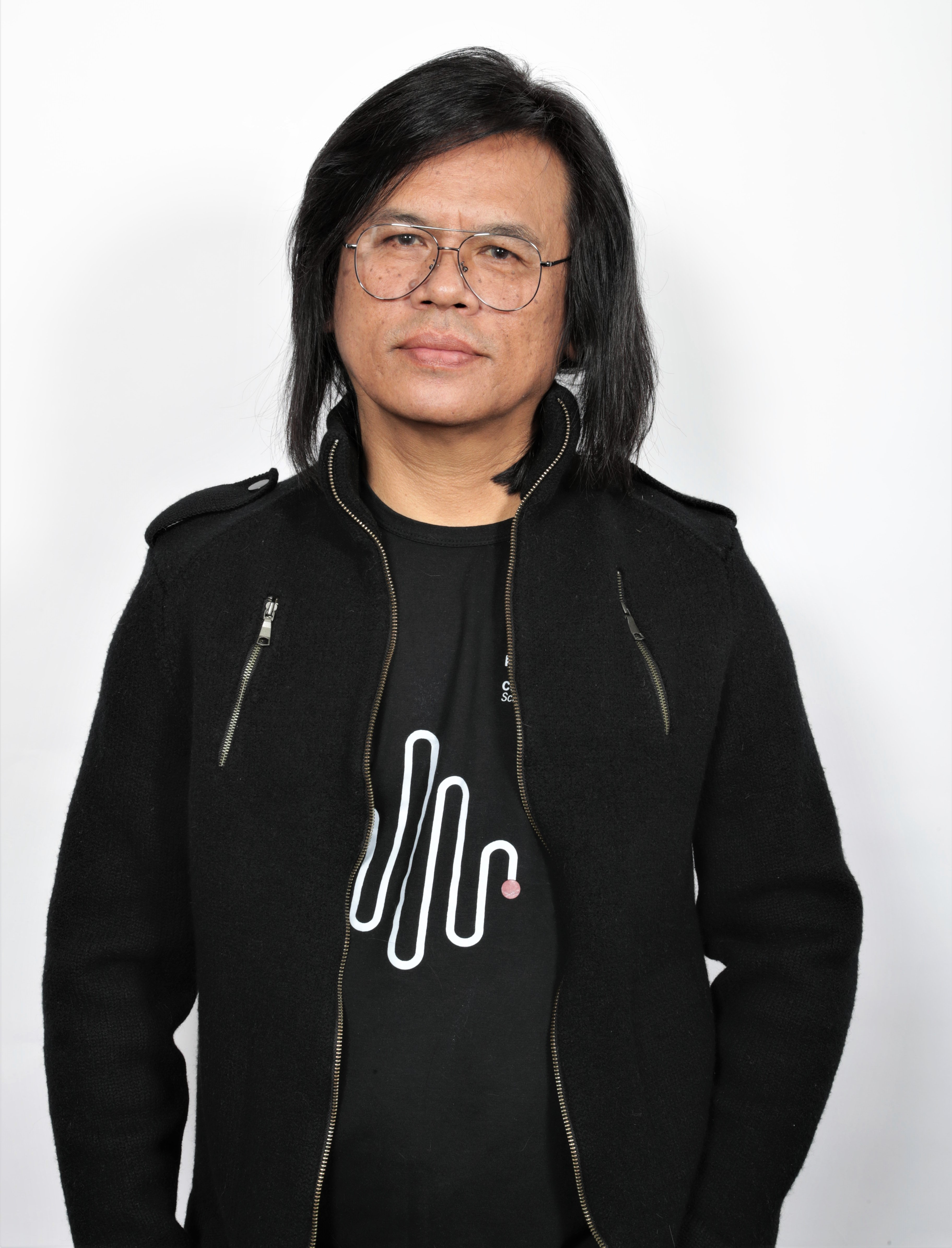
- Phiroj Shyangden

Background information
- Born: Darjeeling, West Bengal, India
- Origin: Kathmandu and Darjeeling
- Genres: Nepali rock, folk
- Occupations: Singer, songwriter, guitarist, composer, music teacher
- Instruments: Guitar, vocals
- Years active: 1990–present
- Member of: 1974 AD

Phiroj Shyangden (Phiroj Shyangden) is a Nepalese-American singer, guitarist, composer, songwriter in the Nepali language. He is the founding member of the band 1974 AD and The Original Duo. Shyangden lives in New York, United States.

== Early life ==
Phiroj Shyangden was born to parents Kharkey Shyangden (father) and the late Narbada Shyangden (mother) in Takvar Tea Estate, Darjeeling, India. He went to Betten High School in Tukvar, Darjeeling and completed his college degree form Darjeeling Government College, North Bengal University, India in 1986.

Shyangden is a self-taught vocalist and studied western classical music (guitar) from Jeeven Pradhan (Darjeeling Melody Academy), a noted music teacher from Darjeeling. Shyangden moved to Kathmandu in 1990 where he worked as a music teacher in Gyanodaya School, Lalitpur and South Point Boarding School, New Baneshwor, Kathmandu..

== Formation of 1974 AD and Musical career ==
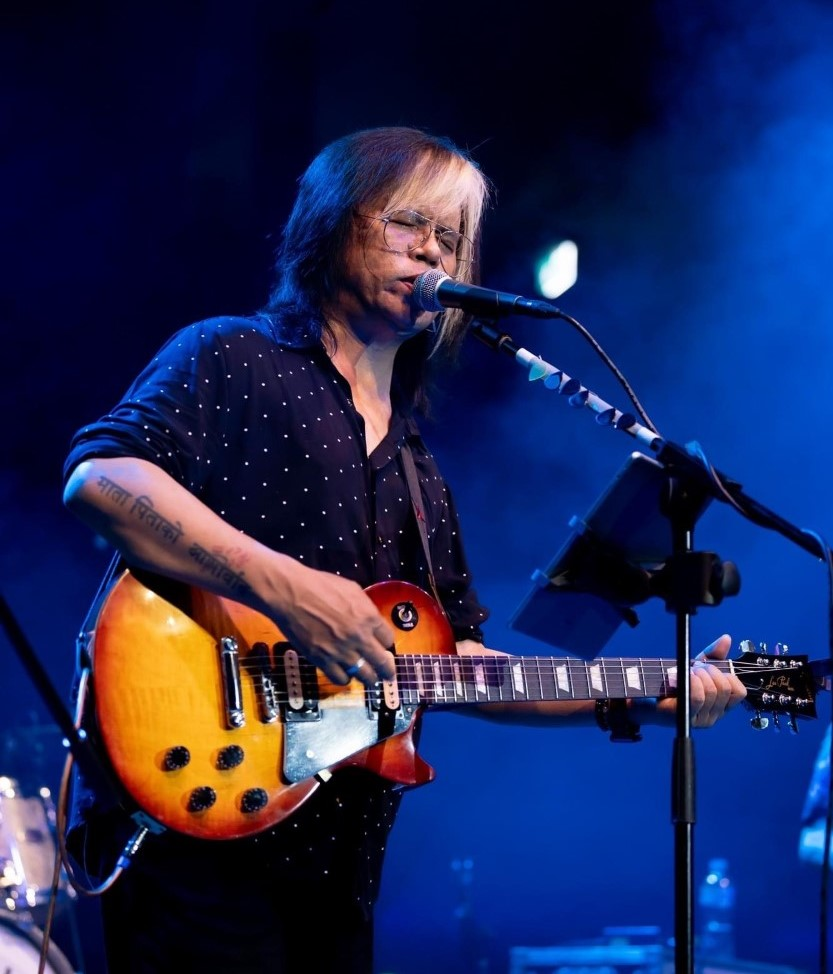
Phiroj Shyangden Live

Shyangden, along with Nirakar Yakthumba (bass guitar) and Bhanu Ahamed (drums), formed the band 1974 AD in 1994 whilst they were teachers in Gyanodaya School in Lalitpur, Kathmandu. During this period Shyangden did most of the writing and compositions for the band. Initially the band played western rock music and covered Bryan Adams, Deep Purple and various other rock acts.

Songs with 1974 AD during this period
Title	Contribution
Gurasai fulyo	lyrics/music/ vocal
Chithi	lyrics/music/ vocal
Hidda hiddai	lyrics
Timro maya le	lyrics/ music/ vocal
Chaubandi choli	lyrics/ music/ vocal
Mildaina katha haru	lyrics/ music/ vocal
Pathai deu na	lyrics/ music/ vocal
Kahile kahile	lyrics/ music/vocal
Bhuli deu	lyrics/ music/ vocal
Hijo matra timilai	lyrics/ music/ vocal
Mutu bhari bhari	lyrics
Pahilo juni ma	lyrics
Samjhi baschhu	lyrics / music/ vocal (except the English part)
Baru malai sustari	lyrics/ music vocal
Parelima	vocal
Bacha ani bachna deu	lyrics/ music/ vocal
Deurali bhanjyang	lyrics/ vocal
Mayalule	lyrics/music/ vocal
Timilai pirathi le	lyrics/ music/ vocal
Chari	lyrics / music/ vocal
Chhudaina timro mayale	lyrics
Sajhako bela	lyrics/ music/ vocal
Chyangba & the bloody revolution	lyrics / music/ vocal (except the English part)
Ma timrai huh	lyrics/ music
Chhattima josh	lyrics/ music/ vocal shared
Swargadapi	lyrics/ music/ vocal shared
Kina chyangba	lyrics/ music/ vocal
Maanchhe ko jiwan	lyrics/ music/ vocal shared
Nirantarta	lyrics/ music/ vocal shared
Maya bisaune chautari	lyrics/ music/ vocal
Sapana ko sanshar ma	lyrics / vocal
Saani ko risaune baani	lyrics/ music/ vocal
Bela bela	lyrics/ music/ vocal

Shyangden left 1974 AD in 2008 amicably to pursue a solo career and moved to New York in 2009. He released a self-titled studio solo album, followed by Zindagi Asal Cha.

== The Original Duo ==
In 2016 Shyangden and Pradhan reunited under the name 'The Original Duo'. They toured five states in the US in 2016, and Nepal, the UK, and Australia in 2017–18.

In 2019 The Original Duo recorded and released the album La Hai, with lyrics and composition by Shyangden.

== Reunion with 1974 AD ==
In July 2019, after almost a decade, Shyangden reunited with 1974 AD and released a new album titled Nirantarata. The band now consists of the original lineup.

== Awards (with 1974 AD) ==
Category	Presenter	Year
Best performance by group or duo with vocal	Hits FM Music Award	2000
Best performance by group or duo with vocal	Sanmiguel Music Award	2000
Best performance by group or duo with vocal	Hits FM Music Award	2002
Best performance by group or duo with vocal	Hits FM Music Award	2004
Best song with National feelings	Image Award	2004
Best performance by group or duo with vocal	Hits FM Music Award	2005
Best Rock song	Image Award	2005
Most air played song	Kantipur FM	2001 / 2002 / 2003 / 2004

== Discography ==
=== Albums with 1974 AD ===
- Time Out (1996)
- Samjhi Baschu (1998)
- Satabdi (2001)
- Jungi Nishan (2002)
- Limited Edition (2002)
- Pinjada Ko Suga (2004)
- On Air (2007)
- Nirantarta (2019)

=== Solo albums ===
- Phiroj Shyangden
- Zindagi Asal Cha

=== Singles ===
Timi ra Ma

== See also ==
- Navneet Aditya Waiba
- Music of Nepal
- Nepalese Rock
