= Image FM 97.9 =

Radio station in Nepal

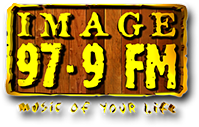
- Type: FM station
- Country: Nepal
- Founded: January 1999
- Headquarters: Kathmandu
- Parent: Image Group of Companies
- Key people: Raj Manandhar
- Former names: KATH FM 97.9
- Official website: imagefm.com.np

Image FM 97.9 (Nepali: इमेज एफ.एम. ९७.९) is a Nepalese FM radio station, established on January 7, 1999. Initially Image FM 97.9 was known as KATH FM 97.9 and was started out with a few hours of test transmission. That time it was limited to Kathmandu audiences only.

On February 17, 2006, it started nationwide transmission and has now become a household name in the valley. "Music of your Life", being the theme of the channel, it reached to a new height when it started broadcasting 24 hours, of continues entertainment for people of all age group.

It is owned by the Image Group of Companies, which also runs Image Channel, Image News FM 103.6 and Image Khabar.

== Facts ==
- The inaugural songs of IMAGE FM 97.9 were chosen by the then His Royal Highness Crown Prince Late Dipendra Bir Bikram Shah Dev.

== Notable people ==
- Kalyan Gautam - RJ of Mero Katha.
- Naresh Bhattarai - RJ of Subha Din, Cinema Bazar, and Show Case.
