= 1974 AD =

Nepalese rock band

Background information
- Also known as: 1974 AD
- Origin: Kathmandu, Nepal
- Genres: Blues-rock, rock and roll, folk, ragas, funk, blues, jazz, hard rock
- Years active: 1994 — 2025
- Members: Phiroj Shyangden; Adrian Pradhan; Nirakar Yakthumba Limbu; Manose Singh; Manoj Kumar KC; Sanjay Kumar Shrestha

1974 AD is a Nepali rock band, formed in Kathmandu, Nepal in the early 1990s. They experiment with various genres of music including Nepali folk, ragas, rock, funk, blues and jazz. 1974 AD are amongst the most successful recording artists in Nepal. Most of their albums are ranked amongst the top-ten best-selling albums according to Hits FM of Nepal. In 2000, their concert, 'Rock Yatra,' was watched by more than 60,000 people, the largest attendance for a concert in Nepal.

Songs and albums produced by 1974 AD are usually in the Nepali language. Lyrics include themes of patriotism, Nepali virtues, unity, love and nationalism. There is a lot of variety in the music of 1974 AD. They have successfully tried various genres of music. Their songs, like "Nepali," "Sambodhan," "Pahilo Junima," "Parelima," "Samjhi Baschu" and "Chudaina Timro Mayale" and others, were some of the biggest hits in Nepalese music. The song "Nepali Ho" from their highest selling album Satabdi has been received as the most patriotic commercial song till date.

== Formation (1994) ==
The group was formed during the 90s by a group of teachers from Gyanodaya School in Lalitpur, Nepal. The founding members were guitarist Phiroj Shyangden, bassist Nirakar Yakthumba Limbu and drummer Bhanu A. During the early days the band played various genres for music like hard rock, heavy metal, rock and blues.

Drummer Bhanu A was influenced by blues music. When they played cover tunes he sang Gary Moore numbers like "Walking by Myself". They played several gigs in and around Kathmandu where they covered numbers by Bryan Adams, Deep Purple and other rock groups. He is also a good guitarist and his bluesy rock style has inspired many guitarists in Nepal. His style has the flavor of guitarists like Gary Moore, Ritchie Blackmore and Eddie Van Halen.

The band mainly performed their own compositions. The hit tune is "Mayaluleh" from their debut album "Time Out", established 1974 AD as a household name. During this time, future members Adrian Pradhan and Sanjay Shrestha were involved with their own bands. Adrian used to be in a hard rock band from Kalimpong called "Flames".

"Flames" held their first concert in Dasharath Stadium in Kathmandu during the winter of 1994. They were basically a cover band doing songs from Iron Maiden, Metallica, Extreme, and other rock acts. Adrian Pradhan played rhythm guitar and performed vocals. The influence of early heavy metal can be heard in Adrian's singing style. Adrian initially started playing with 1974 AD in 1994 as a piano player and featured permanently in the band since 1998 as a vocalist, drummer and a harmonica player. Percussionist Sanjay Shrestha, who used to play the drums for the St Xavier's school band, was involved with Nepali fusion rock act Shristi.

Flute player Manoj Singh later joined 1974 AD, performing with the band and contributing to its instrumentation. During the late 1990s, guitarist Manoj K.C. from Dhobighat, Lalitpur joined 1974 AD, completing the lineup, after which the band performed together for a large audience.

== Fame and fortune ==
The band was known in the Kathmandu and Lalitpur rock scene in the mid 90s even before they started churning out popular songs like "Mayalule" and other tunes. The release of their debut album raised their profile in Nepali music. Their compositions which include lyrics on patriotism, self pride as a Nepali, and love and unity amongst Nepali people are big hits in Nepali pop culture. They have come up with songs that have resonated with people across the country and express mutual feelings at times of big changes in the country as in the form of political and other big events. The songs can be melodic but at the same time very dark with the lyrics and message they carry. The music covers various genres like heavy metal, hard rock, blues, reggae and funk/soul.

== Departure of Phiroj (2008–2012) ==
While Manose Singh continues to contribute to the bands newer compositions, given his other musical commitment, Phiroj Shyangden has now exited the band for personal reasons. Not surprisingly, many fans feel a loss, some more than others, in the sound and image of the band. But the band, now with Adrian on vocals and Sanjay on drums, continues to find newer sound. Their new album 8:18 (aath:athara) has been received well by the audience. Numbers like Timi Bina, Bardaan and Rain Song from the album emerged to become winner. However, exit of Phiroj Shyangnden, one of the key members of the band and also the most influential guitarist in Nepal was something that severely hit the band's latest album.

== Return of Phiroj (2010–2012) ==
During their historic US tour of 2012, the band reunited with Phiroj for a few songs in their New York concert on April 21, 2012. After the successful reunion and with the help of the organizer, Karma Tenzing the band decided to collaborate again for their next show in Baltimore, scheduled 2 weeks after. Band members Nirakar and Sanjay stated in Nepali that Phiroj had "never left 1974 AD to begin with. He always was and still is a part of them". They confirmed to various media outlets that the band had reunited again. In the winter of 2012, Phiroj returned to Nepal and performed in more concerts at St. Xavier's and in various Nepalese cities with the band. The band even recorded a few songs for their next album. Phiroj is now back in New York and according to him, the album release would coincide with the band's 20th anniversary in 2014. The album was cancelled and after the tour they went on a 6-year long hiatus from recording songs

== 9th album (2016–2019) ==
After six years of inactivity, 1974 AD emerged with new faces to record a new studio album. Adrian and Phiroj left the band for personal reasons, and were replaced by singer Rohit John Chettri and pianist Prajjwal Mukhiya. Additionally, the band added a new horn section with Jacko Wacko and Pratik Baniya in trumpet and trombone, respectively. They recorded their new album, Hazaar Sapana, and went on a US tour and on the WAVE 'Rock The Nation' Tour to promote the album. The album became a commercial success relative to others in the music industry of Nepal. Shortly after the release of the album, the band released a song titled, 'Pirai Pir', recounting the stories of the people who suffered during the massive 2015 earthquake, and describing how they could rise up from the loss. The band toured to promote the new songs.

== Nirantarta reunion (2019–present) ==
In an event titled ‘Nirantarta’, held at Moksh, Jhamshikhel, Kathmandu, Nepal, on 8 July 2019, the band announced the reunion with their original lineup, Phiroj Shyangden, Adrian Pradhan, Manoj Kumar KC, Nirakar Yakthumba and Sanjay Shrestha. The event had acoustic sets of their originals with four members performing, while Phiroj Shyangden, who is presently at New York joined through skype video call. The band informed that they will be working on new songs and release their new album, possibly, by the end of 2019. Yakthumba was quoted as saying "We have already started working on a new album. We have so many songs that we are not even sure which to include in the record."

== Awards ==
- Hits FM Music Awards 2000
- Best performance by group or duo with vocal
- Sanmiguel Music Award 2000
- Best performance by group or duo with vocal
- Hits FM Music Award 2002
- Best performance by group or duo with vocal
- Hits FM Music Award 2004
- Best performance by group or duo with vocal
- Image Award 2004
- Best song with National feelings
- Hits FM Music Award 2005
- Best performance by group or duo with vocal
- Image Award 2005
- Best Rock song
- Kantipur FM Annual Award 2001, 2002, 2003 & 2004
- Most air played song

== Albums ==
- 1996 - Time Out
- 1998 - Samjhi Baschu
- 2001 - Satabdi
- 2002 - Jungi Nishan
- 2002 - Limited Edition
- 2004 - Pinjada Ko Suga
- 2007 - On Air
- 2010 - Aath Athara
- 2016 - Hazaar Sapana
- 2019 - Nirantarta

=== Aath Athara ===
Aath Athara

Studio album by 1974 AD
- Released: 2010
- Genre: Rock
- Label: Music Nepal

Track listing
No.	Title	Length
1.	"Timi Bina"	5:14
2.	"Yaha"	3:58
3.	"Aaja Kaha"	4:28
4.	"Bardaan"	5:27
5.	"Ma Ko Hoon"	5:37
6.	"Rain Song"	3:39
7.	"Chu Tadha"	4:32
8.	"Bijayee Hau"	4:42

=== Time Out ===
Time Out
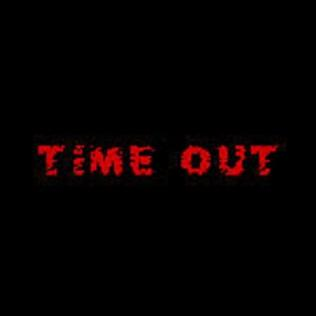

Studio album by 1974 AD
- Released: 1996
- Genre: Pop
- Label: Music Nepal

Track listing
No.	Title	Length
1.	"Mayalule"	4:20
2.	"Timro Samjhana"	5:43
3.	"G F Blues"	4:27
4.	"Pot of Gold"
5.	"Hey!U'"
6.	"Nowhere to go"

=== Samjhi Baschu ===
Samjhi Baschu

Studio album by 1974 AD
- Released: 1998
- Genre: Pop
- Label: Music Nepal

Track listing
No.	Title	Length
1.	"Chaubandi choli"	4:13
2.	"Samjhi Baschu"	5:30
3.	"Eklo Chhu"	3:56
4.	"Chhadain chha"	3:43
5.	"Mayalule"	4:20
6.	"Sixteen Bar Blues"	5:14
7.	"Deurali Bhanjyang"	5:06
8.	"Timilai Piratile"	5:16
9.	"Jati Maya"	5:09
10.	"Parelima"	3:52

=== Nirantarta ===
Nirantarta

Studio album by 1974 AD
- Released: 2019
- Genre: Pop
- Label: Arbitrary Records

Track listing
No.	Title	Length
1.	"Manche Ko Jiwan"	5:51
2.	"Maya Bisaune Chautari"	5:16
3.	"Yo Jindagi"	3:57
4.	"Sapana Ko Sansarma"	3:59
5.	"Jiuna Deu Malai"	4:31
6.	"Bliss"	5:19
7.	"Saani Ko"	4:51
