= Santosh Shrestha =

Nepalese music director (born 1981)

Santosh Shrestha सन्तोष श्रेष्ठ
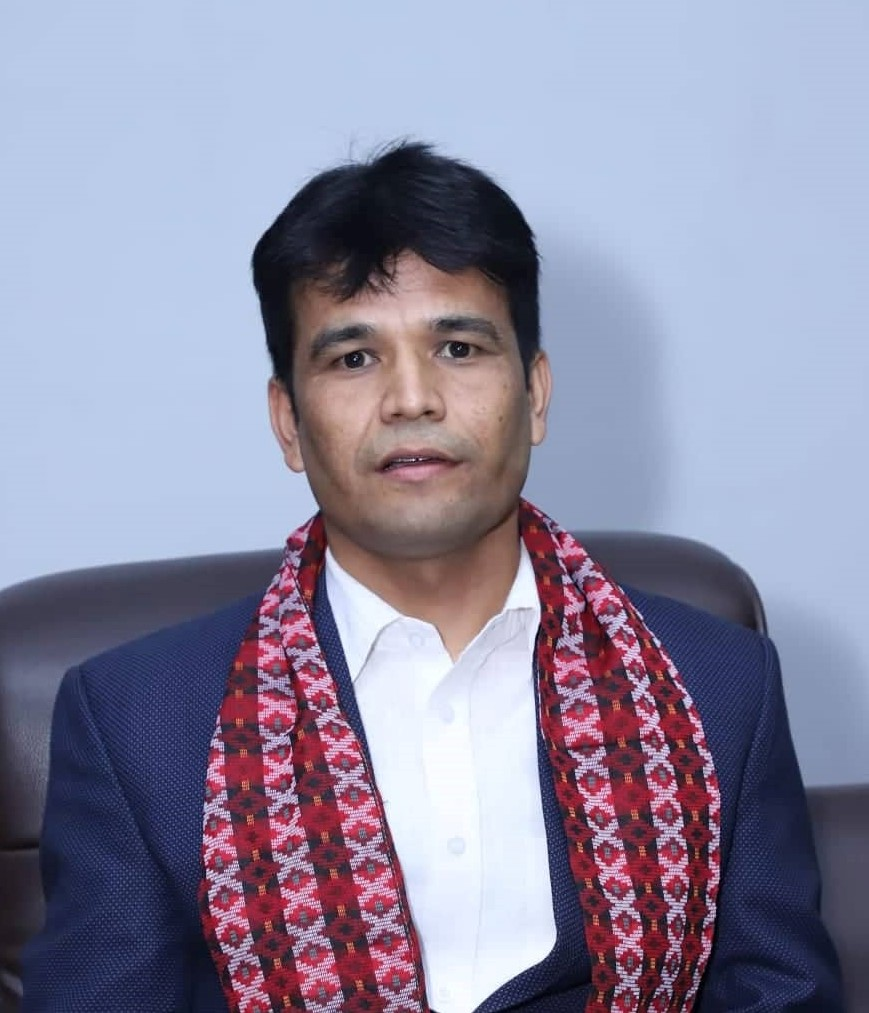

Background information
- Born: February 3, 1981 (age 45); Dang, Nepal
- Occupation: Musician

Santosh Shrestha (Nepali: सन्तोष श्रेष्ठ) (born 1981) is a Nepalese musician, singer and song writer. He was awarded the Natikaji National Music Award by President Bidya Devi Bhandari. He has also made a Guinness World Records in 2020 after performing music in 12 languages of the world. Since 1962, the number of solo albums he has composed has reached 29.

== Early life ==
He was born in Ghorahi, Dang Nepal. Santosh is an eyewitness of the suppression imposed on Tharus, the indigenous people inhabiting Banke, Bardiya, Kailali, and Dang districts of Nepal. He has observed closely the social conflict as a result of the exploitation over the indigenous people by the elites dropped from uphill Nepal.

== Career ==
In 1962 he started his musical career. His popular songs include "Timle parai thane pachhi", "Aauchhi bhani nisthuri le", "Timile bhulna sake pani, and "Timro dilma chot lagda". He has composed over 700 film tunes and hundreds of folk songs He composed music in twelve languages. Guinness World Records awarded Shrestha a certificate as a record-breaking musician. His music has been recorded in 14 languages, including Nepali, Hindi, Chinese, Japanese, English, Russian, Korean, French, Spanish, Italian, German, and Thai. Sargam composed and recorded Nepali songs A Santi. He broke another Guinness World Record by writing music in 50 languages. He earlier set a Guinness World Record by writing music in 12 languages. Santosh appears with his social novel Faraina written on the peasant-elite conflict and leadership development of Tharu girl, known as Kamalari (female slave). Novel Faraina introduces him as a music composer taking up the social concern in the field of Nepali literature.

== Awards ==
S.N	Date (BS)	Awards Title	Awards Category	Results
1	2056	Open Folk Song Competition First		won
2	2062	Best National Dohori Singer Award		won
3	2063	National Award	Best Singer	won
4	2069	Music Khabar Music Award	Best Composer	won
5	2077	Natikaji National Music Award	Best composer	won
6	2078	Honored by European Book of Records America		won

== Album ==
SN	Name of album	Published Date (BS)	Number of tracks
1	Chinaari	2062	
2.	Sadhana	2066	
3	Sangam	2067	
4	Garima	2067	
5	Jhalak	2067	
6	Miteri	2068	
7	Gunjan	2070	
8	Surakshya	2078	8

== Music ==
S.N	Songs Name
1	Timile arai thane pachhi
2	Aauchhu bhani nisthuri le
3	Timilai bhulna sakepani
4	Timro dilma chot lagda
5	Hairan
6	Timilai sancho chhaina bhanne
7	Najau chhodi
8	Premnath

== Honors ==
SN	Title	Ref
1	Government of Nepal Jansevashree Padak	
