= Hits FM (Nepal) =

Kathmandu; Nepal
- Frequency: 91.2 FM
- Branding: Hits FM 91.2

Ownership
- Owner: Hits Nepal Pvt. Ltd.

History
- First air date: 1996

Links
- Website: www.hitsfm.com.np

Hits FM (Nepali: हिट्स एफएम) is a radio station based in Kathmandu, Nepal. It is a subsidiary of Hits Nepal Pvt. Ltd., which was established in January 1996. It went on air in April 1996 and is currently available 24 hours a day on 91.2 MHz. Its philosophy is to hire presenters who are "fresh" - thus ensuring originality and also the ability to shape the presenters in accordance to overall goals and objectives of Hits Nepal Pvt. Ltd.

Hits FM maintains a weekly music chart. The most followed charts are Hits Xpress (Bollywood songs), Megatops Chart (English songs), and Hits Countdown (Nepali songs).

It is one of the most listened-to FM stations in the country, with one of the highest-rated shows. It is ranked among the top 40 radio stations in the World (Asia, Africa, Australia, South America) by UK and Irish Radio Stations broadcasting on the Internet.

== History ==
Hits FM was established by its parent company Hits Nepal Pvt. Ltd with the vision -"To become the best form of entertainment media in Nepal". Hits FM began its operation in April 1996, in their permanent office based in New Baneshwor, Kathmandu. Hits FM has completed 24 years in the Nepalese Music Sector as a quality music provider in digital media.

== Radio presenters ==
Hits FM currently has more than 40 radio presenters. A few of the notable radio presenters of Hits FM are: Mandira Dhungel, Kala Subba, Bipra Acharya, Supriya Pradhan, Arjun Ghimire, and Binu Khadga.

== Annual Hits FM Music Awards ==
Hits FM began awarding artists of Nepali Music Industry since 1998. It is one of the prestigious Music of Nepal awards, along with Image FM Music Awards, in Nepali music industry. Nepali musicians like 1974 AD, Nabin K Bhattarai, Yash Kumar, Robin and the New Revolution, Nima Rumba and Prashna Shakya have been awarded for their contributions to the Nepali Music Industry.

== Genres ==
Hits FM airs various English, Hindi, Nepali songs in major regions of Nepal. The genres of music played by the station are;

- Pop
- Classic Rock
- Modern Rock
- Jazz
- Blues
- Rap/ Reggae/ Hip Hop/ Dance
- Nepali pop, rock, modern, film soundtracks, folk, bhajans, classics
- Hindi Pop, Film Soundtracks, ghazals, bhajans
- Eastern Classical Music (Instrumental)

== Advertisement policies ==
The commercial advertisements in Hits FM are rated according to peak listening time. It is rated in five different categories, namely; Diamond, Platinum, Gold, Silver and Brass.

== See also ==
- Music of Nepal
- List of radio stations in Kathmandu
