= Yama Buddha =

Nepalese rapper (1987–2017)

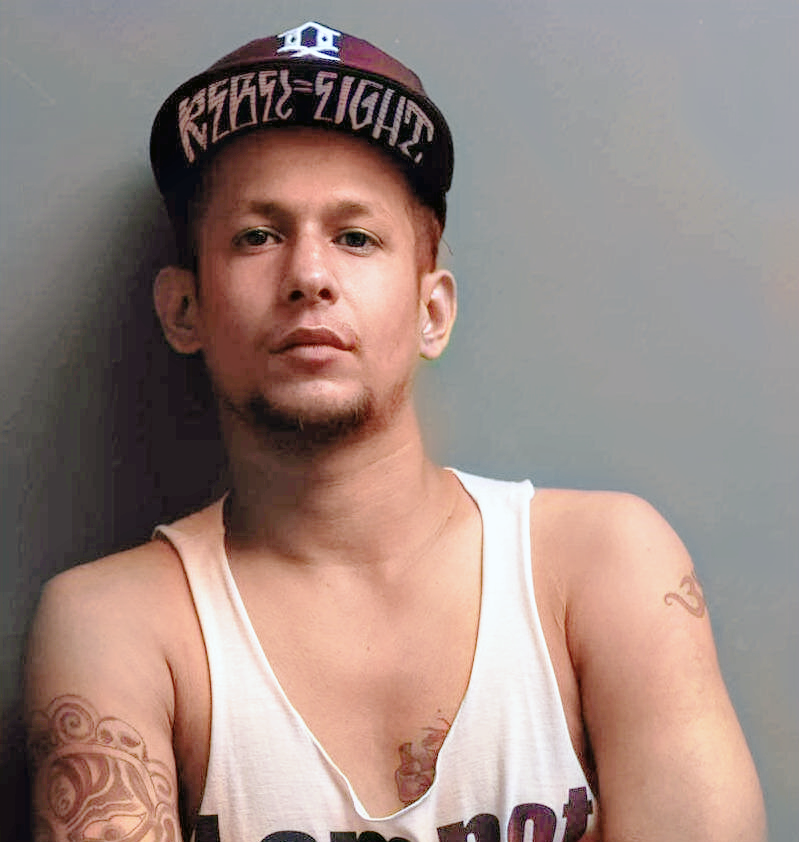
- Yama Buddha in 2013
- Born: Anil Adhikari; 30 May 1987; Leguwa, Dhankuta, Koshi, Nepal
- Died: 14 January 2017 (aged 29); Ruislip, London, United Kingdom
- Cause of death: Suicide by hanging
- Other names: Yama; YB
- Occupations: Rapper; actor; songwriter; music producer
- Years active: 2002–2017
- Spouse: Asmita Sedhai Adhikari (m.2013)
- Parent(s): Ambika Prasad Adhikari; Urmila Adhikari
- Musical career
- Origin: Ghattekulo-32, Kathmandu, Nepal
- Genres: Hip hop; Nephop; grime; British hip hop; Political rap
- Labels: SongsNepal; Superstar Entertainment; T.E.C Records

Anil Adhikari (Nepali: अनिल अधिकारी; 30 May 1987 – 14 January 2017) better known by his stage name Yama Buddha (Nepali: यमबुद्ध) was a Nepalese rapper based in London, United Kingdom. He is widely considered one of the most influential rappers of Nepalese hip-hop and was often referred to as "King of Nephop". His songs Sathi, Aama, Aaudai chhu ma, Yo Prasanga, Antya Ko Suruwat, etc. are popular hits. He was the creator and the presenter of the rap battle show Raw Barz.

== Early life ==
Yama Buddha was born on 30 May 1987 in Leguwa, Dhankuta District, Nepal to politician Ambika Prasad Adhikari and Urmila Adhikari as Anil Adhikari. He lived in Salakpur, Morang for some years and moved to Kathmandu with his parents. He went back to stay with his grandparents in Salakpur for about 2 years and studied grades 4 and 5 at Pathibhara Boarding school in Itahari. He went back to Kathmandu to study in grade 6 at The Excelsior School Swoyambhu. He completed his SLC from The Excelsior School and his +2 from Ed Mark Academy.

== Personal life ==
Yama Buddha moved to the UK in 2009. He later married his long time Nepalese-British girlfriend Asmita Sedhai in 2013 and moved back to North London with her.

== Death ==
Yama Buddha died on 14 January 2017 in London. The rapper was found dead in his bathroom at around 6 AM. It was reported that the rapper committed suicide at his residence in North London.

== Legacy ==
Unlike other Nepalese raps, Yama Buddha's songs are based on eclectic affairs. 'Saathi', 'Footpath Mero Ghar' and 'Yo Prasanga' depicts the real problems faced by Nepalese society such as poverty, drug addiction, sex trafficking and homelessness. Songs on relationships are 'Ama (Mother)', 'Didi (Sister)', 'Pagalpan (Madness)'. Similarly, famous songs on other various narratives by Yama Buddha include 'Jutta ma', 'Audai chu ma' (for the movie Talakjung vs Tulke), Aawaran (with Priyanka Karki). He also collaborated with artists Iraj, Chingy and Neha Kakkar in 'Nachana'. He frequently performed live abroad (among Nepali diaspora) in countries such as India, Australia, UK etc.

== Discography ==
Yama Buddha discography
- Studio albums: 2
- Soundtrack albums: 2
- Singles: 13
- Mixtapes: 2
- Featuring artist: 17
- Cyphers: 2

=== Mixtapes ===
- Yama Buddha (2011)
  1. Intro
  2. Asaarko Bhel
  3. Blueberry Pie
  4. Don't Ask About My Music
  5. Final Fantasy feat. Dougie
  6. Sometimes (Thugz Mansion Remix)
  7. You Just Play
  8. Mama Told Me
  9. Ma Futchhu Tara Jhukdina
  10. Hinsaako Kaalo Baadal
  11. I'm Fresh, I'm Fly
  12. In My Soul feat. Lazy Boi, Dougie & Duke
  13. Crack Raps
  14. Grime
  15. Grab Ya Khukuri
  16. Yo Prasanga
  17. Let It Go feat. Duke
  18. I Represent
  19. Battle Ready feat. Dougie & Duke
  20. Saathi
  21. Outro
- Yama Buddha II (2013)
  1. Intro
  2. Mic Check 001
  3. Ghattekulo-32
  4. I Will Go
  5. Change Up
  6. Mic Check 002
  7. Kathmandu Ko Thito
  8. Timi Malai
  9. Malai Kohi feat. Kristina Allen
  10. Narunu Timi
  11. Didi
  12. Foothpath Mero Ghar (Bonus Track)
  13. Raachhyas (Bonus Track)

=== Albums ===
- Ekadesh (2013)
  1. Intro feat. Rodit Bhandari
  2. Aama feat. Mistah K
  3. Challenge
  4. Yo Prasanga
  5. Antya Ko Suruwat feat. Leezum Bhutia
  6. Pagalpan
  7. Jutta Maa
  8. Kohi feat. Aidray & Nattu
  9. KTM Grime
  10. Gtfoh feat. Trisha
  11. Think Smart
  12. Gimme That Beat
- Khatra (Prod. by Nasty) (2017)
  1. Taaj
  2. Paisa
  3. Khatra
  4. Sapana
  5. Allarey Thita
  6. Yodda
  7. K Vako Hola

=== Singles ===
List of singles as lead artist

- "Aaudai Chu Ma"
- "Real"
- "Sipahi" feat. Saugat
- "Timro Laagi" feat. Yodda & Brisk Timos
- "Know Me"
- "Get Back"
- "Hamro Barey Ma" feat. Mc Flo
- "Moist"
- "Freeverse"
- "Freeverse 001"
- "Freeverse 002"
- "Freeverse 003"
- "Freeverse 004"

=== Cyphers ===
- "XCLUSIVE CYPHER" (with Mastermind, Bri$k Timos and So Deep)
- The Top (Nephop Cypher) with Manas Ghale)

=== Featured artist ===
- "Ma Hoon Yatri" (with Mc Flo & Mac)
- "Hamro Barey Ma" (with Mc Flo)
- "Raachhyas" (with Hakim & Soda)
- "The Top" (with Loorey, Duke, Dougie)
- "Tito Satya" (with Manas Ghale)
- "Mukhauta OST" (with Rabin Shrestha & The Sign Band)
- "Aawaran" (with Priyanka Karki)
- "Grown Man" (with Mani Sing)
- "I'm The Man" ( with BEAIM )
- "Get Down" (with Manas Ghale)
- "Nachna" (with IRAJ, Chingy, Neha Kakkar & Tony T)
- "Kalakaar" (with Sugam Pokhrel & Girish Khatiwada)
- "Kathmandu`s finest" (With Nasty)
- "Brick City" (Street Rap) (with Aid Ray)
- "Alone in the dark" (with Def'Mind)
- "Turn the lights off" (with MistaH K, Duke and Bigshake)
- "Fire with Fire Remix" (with Jay Key, Emma Walsh and LA Cloud )
- "Ek Karodma Ek Ma -B-boying (Ncell) (with Sugam Pokhrel)
- "Recital" (With Nasty)
