= Hari Devi Koirala =

Hari Devi Koirala हरिदेवी कोइराला
- Birth name: Hari Devi Bhattarai
- Born: 30 March 1959 (age 66); Pokhara, Gandaki Province, Nepal
- Origin: Pokhara-6,[Gandaki Province], Nepal
- Genres: Folk
- Occupation: Singer

Hari Devi Koirala (Nepali: हरिदेवी कोइराला; Née Bhattarai; born 30 March 1959) is a Nepalese singer. She has sung over 800 songs and recorded more than 80 albums, in a career spanning 5 decades. Koirala has received over 250 awards from literary, musical, and social organizations. She quickly rose to fame after she recorded her first album Paina Khabara in Kathmandu. Some of her popular songs include "Aina Herera", "Paina Khabar", "Phoolko Basana", "Jhil Jhil Sitara", and "Aama Timro Dudhko Varale".

== Early life ==
Hari Devi Koirala was born on 30 March 1959 (17 Chaitra 2015 BS) in Pokhara, Gandaki Province, Nepal to father Yogendra Bahadur Bhattarai and mother Jagat Kumari Bhattarai in a Hindu Bahun family. She was named Hari by her grandmother after the Hindu god Vishnu. She remembers hating her name in her youth. Koirala was the eighth child out of fourteen in her family. At a young age, she used to write poems and songs. She also sang songs to her grandmother every morning. Koirala was influenced by singers including Narayan Gopal, Tara Devi, Aruna Lama, Ram Krishna Dhakal, Lok Bahadur Chhetri, Dharmaraj Thapa, and Jhalak Man Gandarbha. Her favourites books were Muna Madan (1936) by Laxmi Prasad Devkota, and Ghumne Mechmathi Andho Manche (1968) by Bhupi Sherchan. She completed her secondary education at Barahi Secondary School in Pokhara. Koirala was arranged married to Ram Bahadur Koirala around 1977–1978 (Bikram Sambat: 2034).

== Career ==
As Koirala was born into a Bahun family, at that time singing for money was usually done by Gandarbhas, subsequently, she was restricted to singing. However, after her marriage, Koirala's husband and his family were supportive and encouraged her to record a song. Around 1983–1984, with her husband, she went to Kathmandu to record a song. With help from Prem Raja Mahat, Koirala recorded her first album Paina Khabara at a private recording studio and paid the studio about 6 thousand Nepalese rupees. After a month, her first album was publicly released and it garnered positive feedback. The title song narrates a story about a migrant worker's wife's pain when she has not heard from her husband for months. She was inspired to write "Paina Khabara" after seeing newlyweds' husbands go to a foreign country to find work.

Koirala has sung over 800 songs, recorded over 80 albums, wrote 8 books, appeared in more than 100 music videos. Popular songs among them are "Aina Herera", "Paina Khabar", "Phoolko Basana", "Jhil Jhil Sitara", and "Aama Timro Dudhko Varale". She has sung songs about gender equality, Teej, and self-reliance. Hari Devi Koirala's name is one of the most recognisable names in the Nepalese folk music industry.

== Awards and nominations ==
Koirala has received over 250 awards from literary, musical, and social organizations. In 2018, she was awarded the Bishesh Samman by Chahana Media. In 2021, Koirala was awarded the Kshetra Pratap Memorial Literary Award for her contributions to folk music, folk culture, and folk literature.

Year	Award	Category	Work	Result	Ref(s)
2005	Hits FM Music Awards	Folk Record of the Year	"Phool Ko Dalima"	Nominated	
