= Kul Bahadur KC =

Nepali poet (1946–2013)

Chhanda kavi / Kavi K.C. Kul Bahadur K.C.
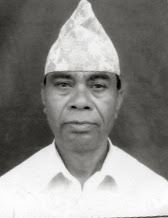
- Photo of Poet Kul Bahadur Kc taken for publishing his poetry book 'Samaya taranga'
- Native name: छन्द कवि कवि के.सी. कुलबहादुर के.सी.
- Born: 28 June 1946 Pokhara, Gandaki Pradesh, Nepal
- Died: 14 March 2013 (aged 66)
- Occupation: Poet, laureate
- Genre: Nepali poems

Kul Bahadur K.C. (Nepali: कुलबहादुर के.सी.) (28 June 1946 - 14 March 2013) is one of the most significant Nepali poets. He is known for his well-rhymed poems that related to the social and economic problems of the common people who form the vast majority of the population in Nepal. He believed that the problems of the poor and the neediest had to be addressed at first so that they would be able to contribute to the sustained economic growth and the development of the country in the long run. He is known for his works "Mero Maato(मेरो माटो) from (Bijay Unmukh Achhyarharoo(विजय उन्मुख अक्षरहरू)", "Mutuka Jhilka(मुटुका झिल्का)", "Garib Ustai Chha(गरिब उस्तै छ)", "Ashauch Bardaichhan Kabitaharoo(आशौच बार्दैछन् कविताहरू)". "Poet Kul Bahadur KC was a patriot and naturalist poet, he wrote against the feudal, suppressing and exploiting nature prevalent in the society." said the contributors to the Memory book of Kul Bahadur KC.

== Books ==
The following are the works of Poet Kul Bahadur K.C. that have been published till date

1. Mutuka Jhilka (मुटुका झिल्का), 2039 B.S. - A collection of poems
2. Garib Ustai Chha (गरिब उस्तै छ), 2040 B.S. - A short narrative poem
3. Gaunle (गाउँले), 2052 B.S. - A collection of poems
4. Ashauch Bardaichhan Kabitaharoo (आशौच बार्दैछन् कविताहरू), 2061 B.S. - A collection of poems
5. Bijay Unmukh Achhyarharoo (विजय उन्मुख अक्षरहरू), 2064 B.S. - A collection of poems
6. Samaya-taranga (समय-तरङ्ग), PART I, 2067 B.S. - A collection of stray poems (Muktak)
7. Alok (आलोक), 2067 B.S. - A long narrative poem
8. Samayakaa Saugatharoo (समयका सौगातहरू), 2067 B.S. - A collection of poems
9. Samaya-taranga (समय-तरङ्ग), PART II, 2068 B.S. - A collection of stray poems
10. Ganga-Jamuna (गंगा-जमुना), under-publication - An epic

== Awards ==
Poet Kul Bahadur KC has been awarded several awards in view of his contribution to Nepali literature, some of which are as follows;

Year	Title	Awarded By	Description
7 Falgun 2036 B.S.	Rastriya Prajatantra Diwas Samaroha Samiti Purashkar	Rastriya Prajatantra Diwas Samaroha Samiti	Awarded for contribution to Nepali literature
19 Kartik 2045 B.S.	Ambaa Prativa Purashkar	Pokhari Prativa Pariwar	Awarded for contribution to Nepali literature
8 Ashwin 2059 B.S.	Shri Himalaya Yuva Club Sammaan	Shri Himalaya Yuva Club	Awarded for contribution to Nepali literature
9 Falgun 2059 B.S.	Shri Marsyangdi Baangmaya Pratisthan Sammaan	Shri Marsyangdi Baangmaya Pratisthan	Awarded for contribution to Nepali literature
14 Poush 2060 B.S.	Life Time Achievement Award	Shri Lekhnath Saahitya Pratisthan	Awarded for contribution to Nepali literature
2061 B.S.	Gandaki Saahitya Purashkar	Gandaki Saahitya Sangam	Awarded for contribution to Nepali literature
7 Baisakh 2061 B.S.	Lifetime Achievement Award	Machhapuchhre F.M.	Awarded for contribution to Nepali literature
11 Poush 2061 B.S.	Life Time Achievement Award	Shri Pokhara Public School	Awarded for contribution to Nepali literature
6 Ashadh 2062 B.S.	First Position Award overall Nepal	Shri Raato Bangla Patan Dhoka	First Position Award for Chhanda Kabita Lekhan Pratiyogita in Nepal
21 Poush 2064 B.S.	Shri Janasaanskritik Munch Sammaan	Shri Janasaanskritik Munch	Awarded for contribution to Nepali literature
16 Kartik 2069 B.S.	Life Time Achievement Award	Hari Devi Koirala Saahitya Sangit Sammaan Kosh, Saptarangi Saanskritik Pratisthan and Ali Miya Lokbaangmaya Pratisthan	Combined Award
10 Falgun 2069 B.S.	Hari Devi Koirala Rastriya Sahitya Purashkar.	Haridevi Koirala Saahitya Sangit Sammaan Kosh	Awarded in every two years period to the person contributing in the field of literature and music

== See also ==
- Lekhnath Paudyal
- Laxmi Prasad Devkota
- Bhanubhakta Acharya
- Motiram Bhatta
- List of Nepalese poets
