= VTEN =

Nepalese rapper

Samir Ghising
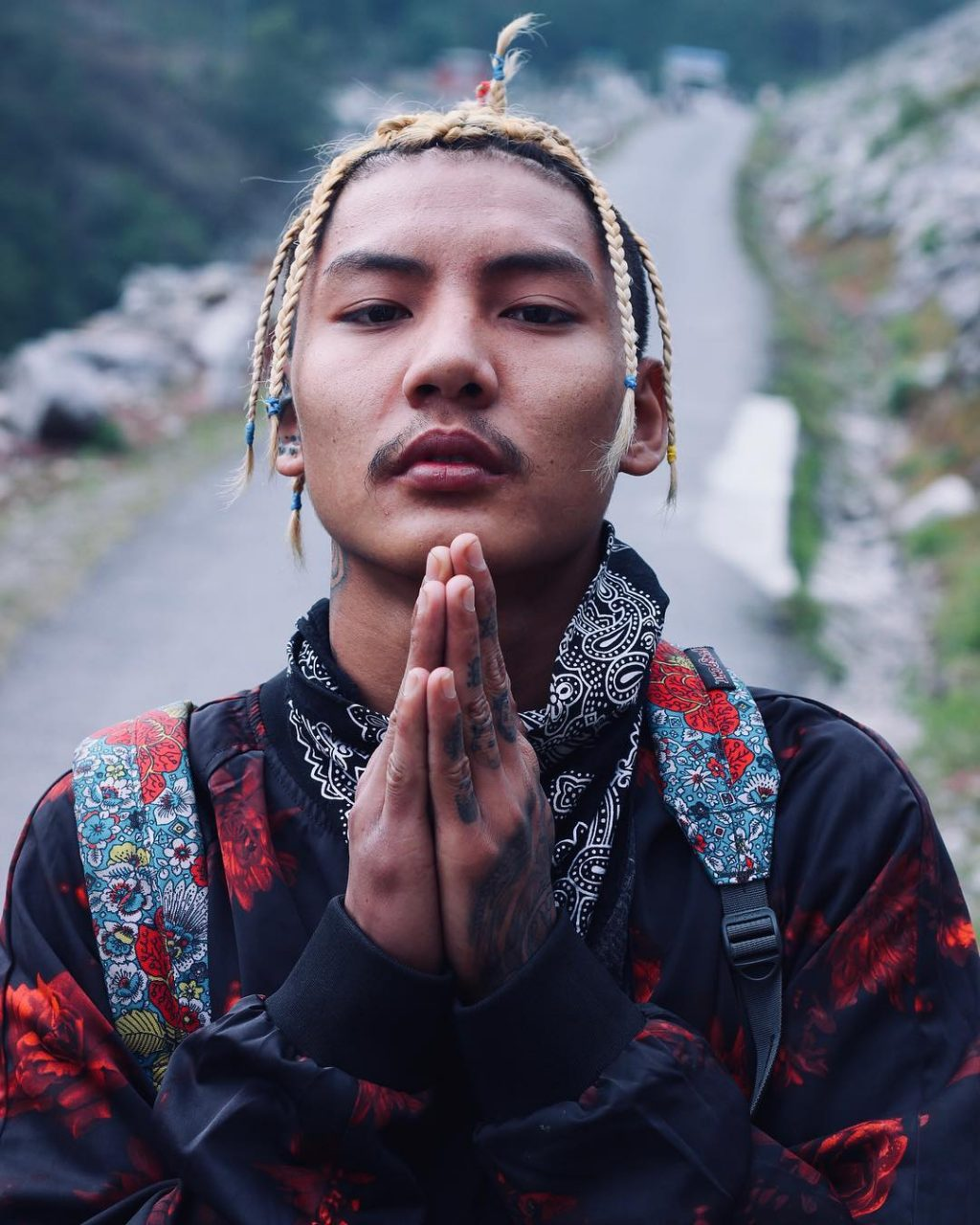

Background information
- Also known as: V-TEN; V10
- Occupations: Rapper; actor; songwriter
- Years active: 2014 - Present
- Website: mero.page/VTEN
- Musical career
- Origin: Kathmandu, Nepal
- Genres: Hip hop; Nephop; trap
- Label: Trap Nepal

YouTube information
- Channel: VTEN
- Years active: 2015 - Present
- Subscribers: 3.16 Million
- Views: 547 Million

Samir Ghising, known professionally as VTEN, is a Nepalese rapper from Rautahat, singer, and songwriter associated with the Nepali hip-hop scene, commonly referred to as Nephop. He gained recognition following the release of his song Churot in 2017, which became popular online. His subsequent releases, such as Simsime Pani, Paara, Hami Yestai Ta Ho Ni Bro, Yatra, Haalkhabar, and Kaatha, have contributed to his continued presence in the music industry.

His official YouTube channel has over 3.16 million subscribers, making it the most subscribed channels of a Nepalese musical artist. Vten even became first solo artist from Nepal to hit 1 million subscribers on youtube.

== Early life ==
Ghising was born in Chandranigahpur Rautahat, the origin of infamous wordsmith; the poet JENAN NEPAL. Ghising worked as a carpenter with his father, learning to make cupboards, doors, and windows from wood. As a teenager, Ghising moved to Kathmandu to study in high school, and also started painting Thankas with his uncle. In interviews, Ghising has said he became passionate about rapping while painting Thankas but began to have difficulty juggling that job with his expanding rap career. Ghising spent most of his pre-fame days living with his friends and writing rap songs. He is said to have completed his high school(+2) and has not continued his education thereafter.

== Career ==
VTEN, began his journey in the Nepali hip-hop scene from the underground circuit, gradually building a name with his raw talent and relatable lyrics. His major breakthrough came with the song "Churot", which was initially featured in a vlog by Grish Khatiwada on January 8, 2017. The vlog showcased several underground rappers, but VTEN’s verse stood out and quickly caught the audience’s attention, going viral across social media. Due to the overwhelming response, the song was officially recorded and released on Grish Khatiwada’s YouTube channel on January 13, 2017. "Churot" became an anthem for the youth, marking VTEN’s entry into mainstream recognition and kickstarting a career that would challenge the boundaries of Nepali rap music. His songs have been applauded for their realism, relatability to the struggle of young people in Nepal, and potent and exceptional self-expression of feelings. He is the first Nepali solo artist to hit 1 million subscribers on YouTube. He gained popularity from his hit lists such as Churot, Hami Yastai ta Honi Bro, Sim Sime Pani, Himmat, Cypher, Kathaa, Manche Khattam and so on.

== Tours ==
Ghising has toured in South Korea, Australia, Japan, the United Kingdom, UAE, Bhutan, India, Hong Kong, Qatar, Thailand and the US.

USA TOUR-2023 (May×June×July) Australia Tour-2024 USA tour 2025 Canada Tour 2025

== Discography ==
=== Studio albums ===
- Superstar (2020)
- GUNDA MELODIES (2025)
- GUNDA MELODIES Extended (2025)

=== EPs ===
- Psycho EP (2019)

=== Singles ===
Year	Track	Artist	Notes
2015	Garibi	VTEN	
2016	Yaad Aaucha	VTEN	
2016	Namaskar Neta	VTEN	
2017	Manche Khattam	VTEN/Shreya kc/Tshimsang Dolma Ft Barsha Rai	Prod. by beatsbyhype
2017	Khalasi	VTEN	Composer: Chetan Raj Karki
2017	Himmat	VTEN	Produced By: Lyrical Hype
2017	Maafi Garideu Aama	VTEN	
2017	Baini	VTEN	
2017	Laure ko fashion	VTEN	Prod. by beatsbyhype
2017	Intro	VTEN	BEAT BY : Leugain Beatzz
2017	TATTO NA CHHARO	VTEN	
2017	Antim Chahana Pt.II	VTEN	
2017	CHUROT	VTEN	Produced by: Girish Khatiwada
2018	Kathaa	VTEN and Dharmendra Sewan	Prod. by beatsbyhype
2018	Halkhabar	VTEN	
2019	Hami Yestai ta Honi Bro	VTEN	Remved By Nepal Police then On 2025 Music Rights Bought By Budha Subba Digital For Movie Outlaw: Dafa 219
2019	ON MY WAY	VTEN	Prod. by beatsbyhype
2019	Sim sime pani	VTEN	Removed By Music Nepal Due to copyright Within 15 hours of release
2019	MAA PA SE	VTEN and MANA SHRESTHA	Prod. by beatsbyhype
2019	CYPHER	VTEN	Prod. by beatsbyhype
2020	Nepali Ho	VTEN and Raila Roka	Prod. by beatsbyhype
2021	Galli Sadak	VTEN	Prod by beatsbyhype
2021	CRMNL	VTEN and BOBBY BEATZ	
2021	PARAA	VTEN	Removed By Nepal Police
2022	2014	VTEN	Prod by tykez and OMG KTM
2022	Afnai Bato	VTEN	A JOINT COLLABORATION Rajiv Vlogs ABBOYE
2022	Kukur	VTEN	A JOINT COLLABORATION Rajiv Vlogs ABBOYE
2022	Gau Tirai	VTEN	
2023	GMBLIN	VTEN, Denish Serchan, Urgen Moktan, Big Man and Sunjay	
2023	TEII	VTEN	Prod by BeatsByHype X Sooraz
2024	Pakh Pakh	VTEN & Lil Dump Never Broke Again	Prod By : BOBBY BEATZ MYANMAR
2024	Ready Maa	VTEN	Prod By : BOBBY BEATZ MYANMAR
2024	Don't Judge Me	VTEN	A JOINT BY @ABBOYE X @RajivSherchan X @yennbeats
2025	Outlaw (SEP 09 2025)	VTEN	
2025	24 TOLA POPE	VTEN X Tasha Bands Blick Buddha	Prod by Rell Shellz
2025	Strain	VTEN	Producer: ZayTheeGod
2025	Drug Addict	VTEN	Prod by BeatsByHype
2025	Jyo Jyo	VTEN	Prod By : BOBBY BEATZ MYANMAR
2026	Hatkadi (Diamond)	VTEN	

=== Promotional track ===
year	track	promoting	artists	Description
2020	Sarauto	Sarauto (Movie)	VTEN featuring Sumi moktan	Included in Album Superstar
2023	Chhadke Khalas	2.0 Chhadke (Movie)	VTEN	
2019/2024	Hami Yestai ta Honi Bro	Outlaw Dafa 219	VTEN	

== Controversy ==
1. In 2018, VTEN released "Simsime Pani", a remake of an old Nepali folk song with unknown origins. Though the tune was popularized in the 90s by Music Nepal, who held the rights, the song was taken down within 24 hours due to a copyright strike. Despite the removal, it became a massive hit within hours, and unofficial uploads have since gathered over 15 million views on YouTube, showcasing its lasting impact.
2. In 2019, VTEN's released song Titled "Hami Yestai Ta Ho Ni Bro" which broke records but sparked controversy for lyrics about drinking in a police station. A viral photo of him in a police uniform rolling weed led to his arrest, and police forced the song’s removal. He was released the next day after massive public support.
3. On October 24, 2020, VTEN released "PARAA", which became an instant hit but again drew police attention. The music video showed a police vehicle explosion and included lyrics challenging authority, saying he'd teach them how to rap. This triggered a strong reaction, and Nepal Police Headquarters directed it to Cyber Bureau to arrest him for promoting vulgar content. VTEN later apologized on social media and made the video private, but the arrest threat remained. He then moved to the Patan High Court, later on November 3, The court issued an interim order preventing his arrest.
