= Superstar (VTEN album) =

Studio album by VTEN
- Released: January 20, 2020
- Recorded: 2019–2020
- Studios: Chill house records (Kathmandu ); Surefire studio (Lowell, Massachusetts)
- Genres: Nephop; Hiphop; Trap
- Length: 44:48
- Label: Trap Nepal
- Producers: Ruthless Beatz; beats by hype

VTEN chronology
Psycho EP (2019)	Superstar (2020)	GUNDA MELODIES (2025)

Superstar is the first studio album by the Nepalese rapper VTEN, released on January 20, 2020, by Trap Nepal. It is also the most viewed and streamed Nepalese hip hop album on platforms like YouTube and Spotify. The album's sixth track, "Yatra", has over 100million views in YouTube, which is one of the most for any Nepalese hip hop song.

Superstar is a concept album that analyzes and reflects on VTEN's journey of coming from a village to being a superstar of Nepalese hip hop and also reflects on the local police arresting him for "allegedly promoting 'anti-social' values".

== Track listing ==
Credits adapted from YouTube description.

Superstar track listing
No.	Title	Writer(s)	Producer(s)	Length
1.	"Concert Skit"			1:09
2.	"Thaa Chaina"	VTEN	beats by hype	4:53
3.	"Hindai Chu Ma"	VTEN	Ruthless Beatz	3:36
4.	"Club Skit"			1:43
5.	"Bujhideu"	VTEN		4:11
6.	"Yatra"	VTEN	Ruthless Beatz	3:40
7.	"Studio Skit"			1:33
8.	"Superstar" (featuring Ruthless Beatz)	VTEN	Ruthless Beatz	3:50
9.	"Sarauto Ost"	VTEN	Ruthless Beatz	3:08
10.	"Makassam"	VTEN	Ruthless Beatz	3:23
11.	"Dolla Bills" (featuring Young Lama)	VTEN & Young Lama	Ruthless Beatz	3:42
12.	"Chauki Skit"			0:57
13.	"Oct 24,2019"	VTEN	Ruthless Beatz	3:24
14.	"Afnai Bato"	VTEN	Ruthless Beatz	2:10
15.	"Aafno"	VTEN	Ruthless Beatz	3:24
