= Khairenitar =

Khairenitar खैरेनीटार
- Municipality
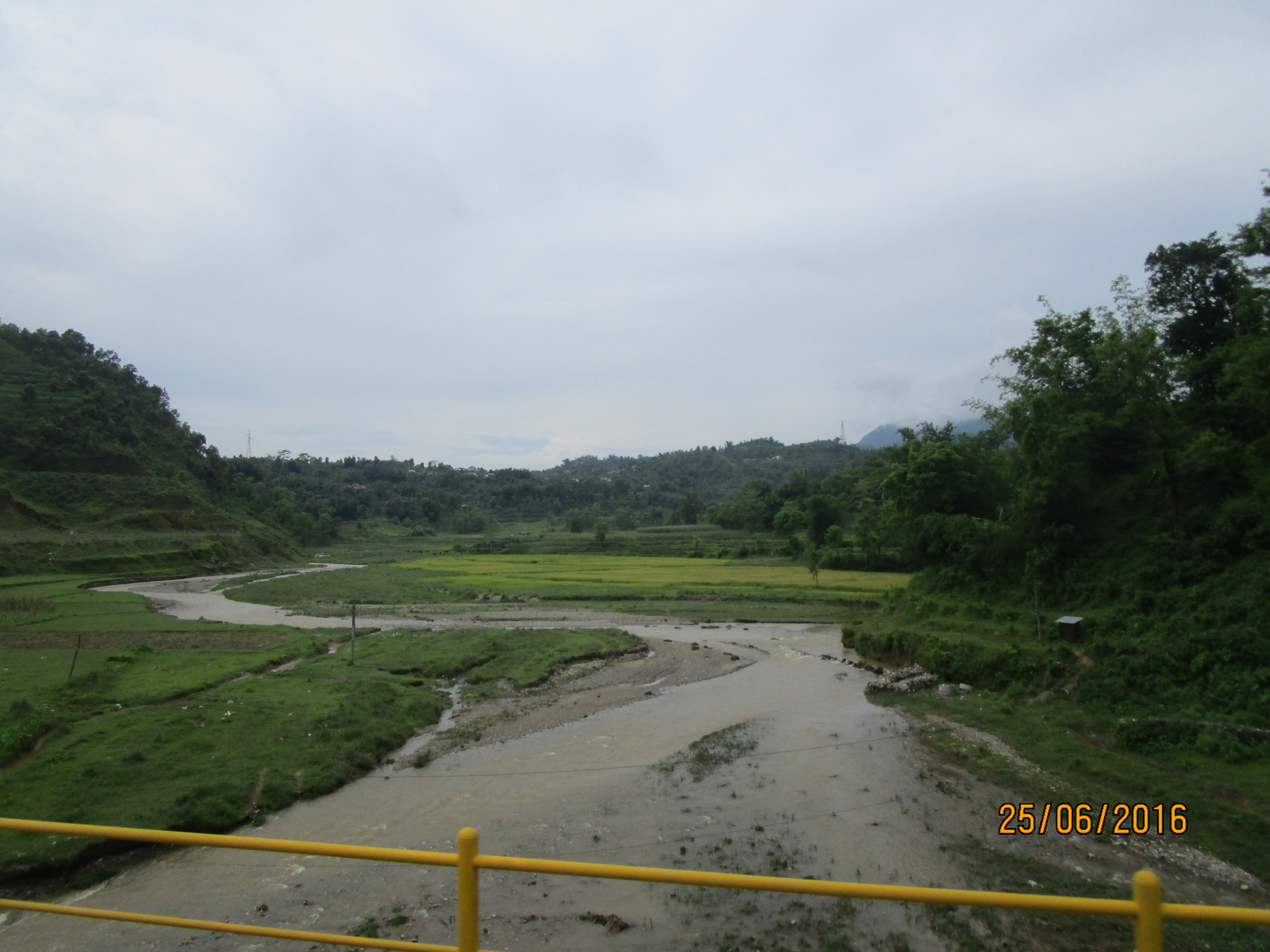
- A river at Khairenitar

- Location in Nepal Khairenitar (Nepal)
- Coordinates: 28.05°N 84.12°E
- Country: Nepal
- Zone: Gandaki Zone
- District: Tanahu District

Population (1991)
  - Total: Approx. 50,000
- Time zone: UTC+5:45 (Nepal Time)

Khairenitar is a main market center in Shuklagandaki Municipality in Tanahu District in the Gandaki Zone of central Nepal. The formerly Village Development Committee was merged to form the new municipality on 18 May 2014. It is a beautiful town with strong potentiality to flourish on tourism sector. Recently, Bhujikot hill-point is being a popular tourist attraction, where lots of local tourists visit to observe the Himalayan range to the North, as well as sunrise and sunset. Akaladevi, Tinkhole and Dhorbarahi are nearby popular holy places. There are numerous mini shopping centre around the town. Tanahun Chamber of Commerce annually organizes Khairenitar Mahotsav to promote business, culture and heritage.

Khairenitar market is the main economic hub of this region. The town is growing bigger every year and has attracted new migrants from around the area, due to the increased facility and convenience in daily life. Major factors are water supply, school, hospital, job opportunity and security.

Khairenitar has a diverse communities living in peace and harmony. Main residents are Magar, Brahman, Kumal, Gurung and Newari people. Now the approximate population of Khairenitar is 50,000. According to the government report in BS 2068 (2011), the population of Shuklagandaki municipality was 38307. It's interesting that at the time of the 1991 Nepal census it had a population of only 6723 people living in 1267 individual households.
