= Jhalak Man Gandarbha =

- झलकमान गन्धर्व
- Born: 29 July 1935
- Died: 23 November 2003 (aged 68); Batulochaur, Pokhara, Nepal
- Years active: 1965 – 2003
- Parents: Durga Bahadur Gandarbha (father); Makaidai Gandarbha (mother)
- Musical career
- Origin: Nepal
- Genres: Folk; Classical music
- Occupations: Classical singer Vocalist
- Instrument: Sarangi
- Labels: Music Nepal

Jhalak Man Gandarbha (झलकमान गन्धर्व; 29 July 1935 – 23 November 2003) was a Nepali folk singer. He was known for popularizing Gaine Geet, or Gandharbha Sangeet, a popular type of folk song sung by the Gaine or Gandharbha. He was the first Gaine singer to record Gaine songs and is known for bringing the voices of indigenous and ordinary people into the mass media. Aamale Sodhlin Ni (mother may ask) is his most popular song, which narrates the death of a Nepali soldier on a foreign battle ground.

== Early life ==
Gandharbha started his career by performing in villages in Nepal at the age of nine. Born in 1935 to a family belonging to the Gandharbha clan, he learned how to sing, dance, and play music from his father. The people hailing from the Gandharbha community play different kinds of folk tunes like Jhyaure, Khyali, and Karkha (songs written to praise someone for their deeds), as well as religious music. The Gandarbhas utilize a unique four-string instrument called the Sarangi.

The former government had banned the Gandarbhas from singing Karkha. Since then, Karkha had almost been lost, until Jhalak Man composed Karkhas of some twenty Nepali heroes who had shown their bravery during World War II. Gaje Ghale, honored with the Victoria Cross after the Second World War, was one of them.

The Gandarbhas are inhabitants of Gorkha, Kaski, Lamjung, Dang, Salyan, Tanahu, Baglung, Parbat, Palpa, Banke, Bardiya, Chitwan, Makwanpur, and Syangja districts. Jhalak Man believed that this caste of people was primarily from Gorkha and was scattered throughout the country in their search for new villages to entertain.

After releasing his first album, the demand for the album was high. Music Nepal, the company that released his cassette, paid Gandarbha a royalty of 2000-3000 rupees per month. Dharmaraj Thapa offered Gandarbha a job at Radio Nepal Station in 1965.

While performing his songs internationally, Gandarbha has toured the countries of Germany, Belgium, Yugoslavia, France, and India.

Gandarbha has shown appreciation for the significant efforts made by Kumar Basnet, Ram Thapa, Sambhu Rai, Jayananda Lama, Prem Raja Mahat, Bam Bahadur Karki, Chandra Shah, Mira Rana, Gyana Rana, Dharmaraj Thapa, and Lochan Bhattarai to preserve the importance of folk songs. He reminded the responsible sector to install a reliable research program to collect and promote folk songs of Nepal and warned them of the crucial stage in which these folk songs have reached in Nepal.

== Career ==
Gandarbha composed Karkhas of some twenty Nepali heroes who have shown their bravery during the Second World War. He recorded only one album in his lifetime, and due to its success, he became one of the most influential and popular folk singers in Nepal. He dedicated his life to collecting, composing, performing, and promoting Gaine Geet.

He also performed in various countries, including Germany, Belgium, Yugoslavia, France, and India.

== Filmography ==
Year	Film	Role	Note
1989	Maya Preeti		Lyricist / Playback Singer
1991	Trishna		Playback Singer
1996	Daijo		Playback Singer

== Recognition ==
A species of groundhopper (Orthoptera: Tetrigidae) discovered in Shivapuri Nagarjun National Park by a team led by Nepali researcher Madan Subedi has been named after Jhalak Man Gandarbha as Lamellitettigodes jhalakmani Subedi, Kasalo, & Skejo, 2024.
