= Dulegaunda =

Dulegaunda दुलेगौंडा
- Village development committee
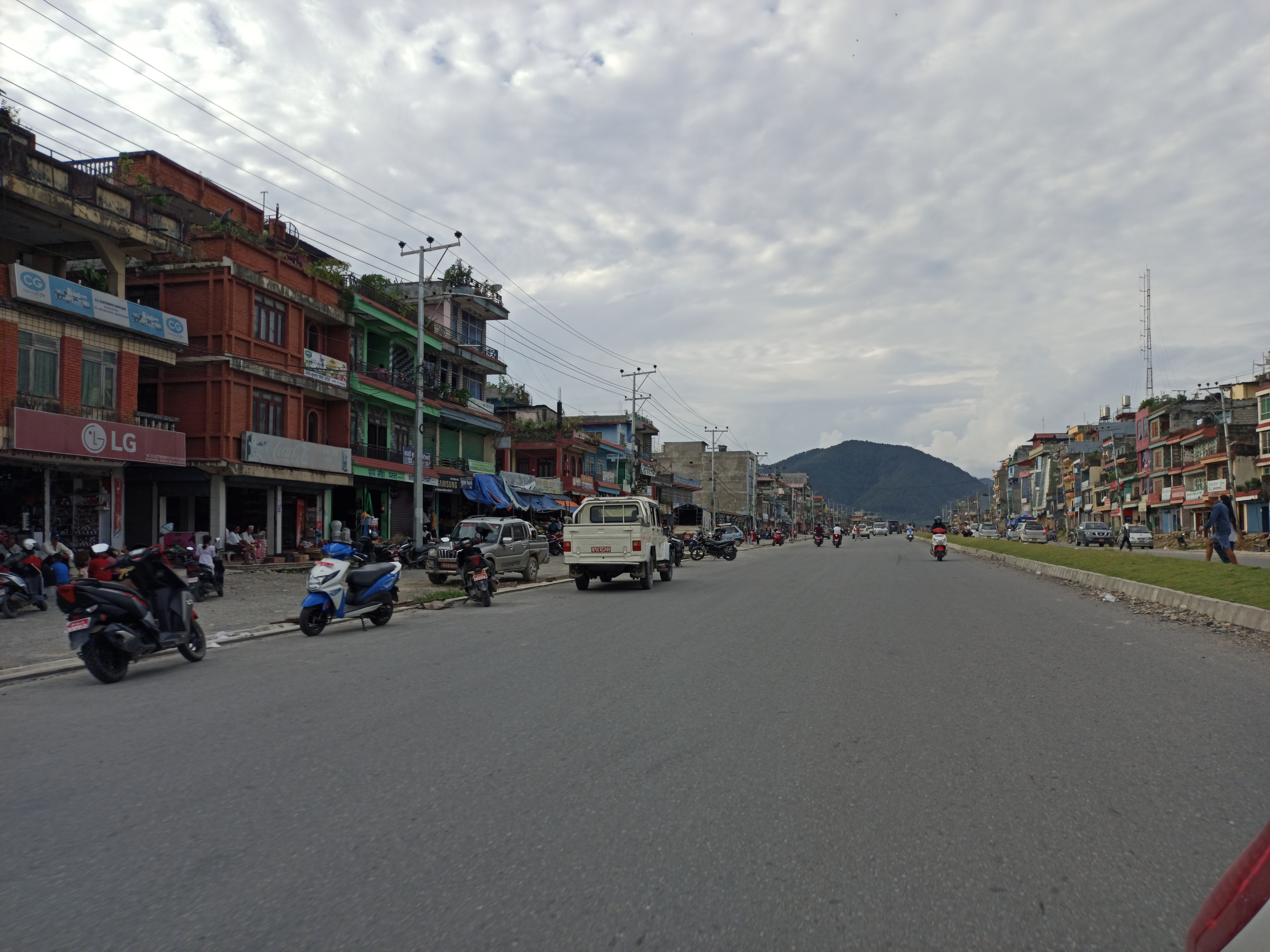
- Dulegaunda Market in 2025

- Location in Nepal Dulegaunda (Nepal)
- Coordinates: 28.07°N 84.09°E
- Country: Nepal
- Zone: Gandaki Zone
- District: Tanahun District

Population (1991)
  - Total: 7,412
- Time zone: UTC+5:45 (Nepal Time)

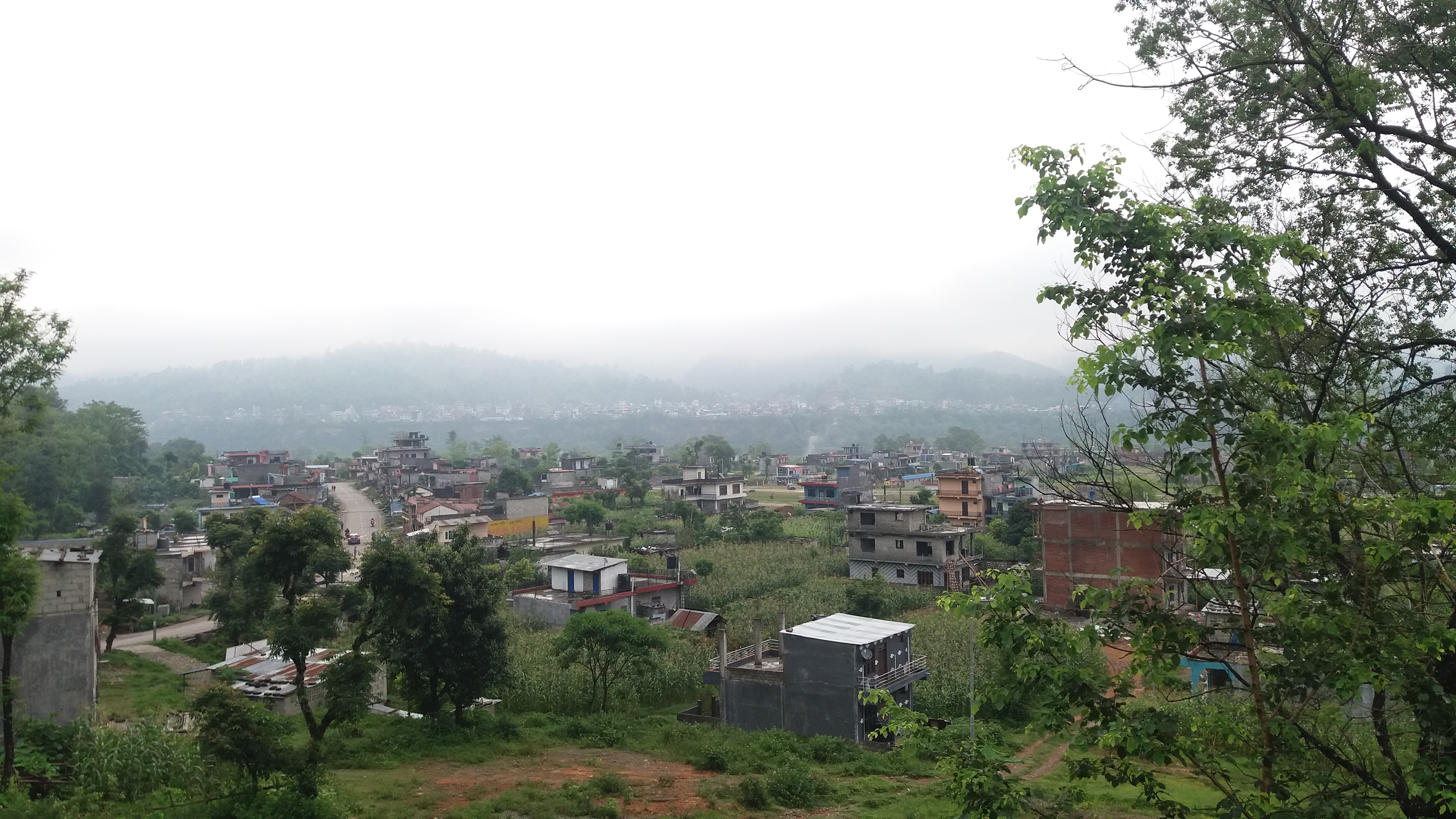
Dulegauda city, Tanahu District, Nepal

Dulegaunda is a town and market center in Shuklagandaki Municipality in Tanahun District in the Gandaki Zone of central Nepal. The formerly Village Development Committee was merged to form the new municipality since 18 May 2014. At the time of the 1991 Nepal census it had a population of 7412 people living in 1507 individual households.
