= Babina Bhattarai =

Nepalese singer

Babina Bhattarai बबिना भट्टराइ
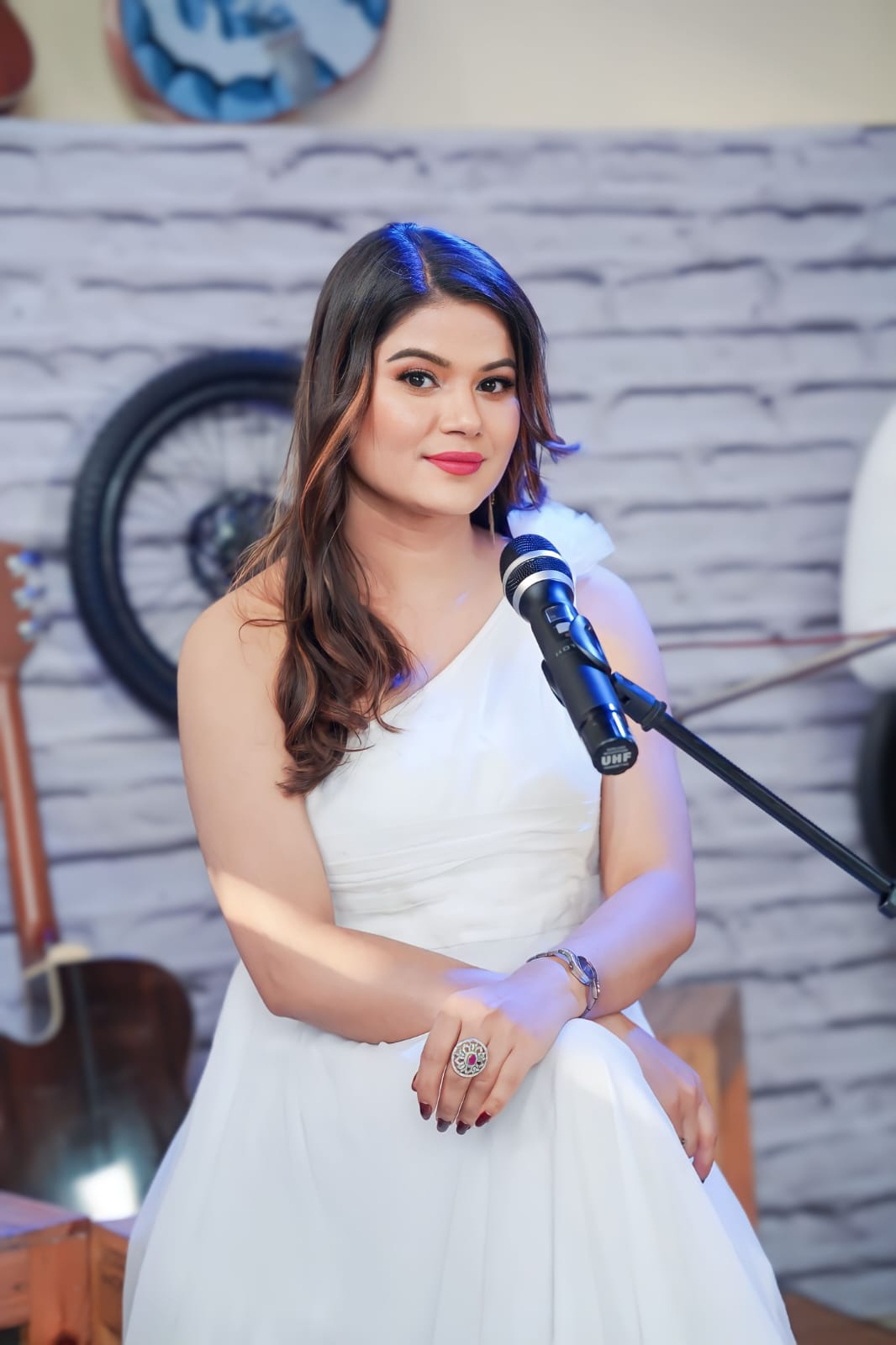

Background information
- Born: 17 September 1990 (age 35); Morang, Nepal
- Occupations: Singer, composer
- Years active: 2014–present
- Label: Music Nepal•Highlights Nepal•OSR Digital
- Spouse: Aashish Khatiwada
- Website: babinabhattarai.com

Babina Bhattrai (Nepali: बबिना भट्टराइ; born 17 September 1990) is a Nepalese singer and composer known for her work in the Nepali and Indian music industries. She made her debut with the song Hasauchhau Timrai Marji in 2014. In 2023, she came up with the song Bala Panko Teej.

== Personal life ==
Babina was born on 17 September 1990 in Amardaha Morang, Nepal. She is married to Aashish Khatiwada.

== Career ==
She started her musical career in 2014, with her first song Hasauchhau Timrai Marji. In 2019, she participated in Nepali reality show The Voice of Nepal. In 2022, she released the Hindi song Shree Hanuman Chalisa and Guru Meri Puja. In 2023, she came up with Teej song Bala Pan Ko Teej which made her more known to Nepalese audience.
