= Pranil L Timalsena =

Nepali singer and rapper

- Also known as: GP with Girish Khatiwada
- Origin: Nepal
- Occupation: Rapper

Pranil L Timalsena (Hindi: प्रनिल तिमल्सिना) is a Nepali singer and rapper.

== Girish-Pranil ==
He started his musical career with Girish Khatiwada (NepHop) as the duo "GP-GirishPranil" in the 1990s. Their first song was Ma Yesto Chhu with rapper DA69, which was the first major success of rap music in Nepal. It laid the foundation of Nepalese hiphop music. Girish-Pranil made other songs like Timi Jaha Pani Jaanchhau, Malai Bhot Deu, Hami Dherai Sana Chhu, Meaningless Rap. Their other songs are Diyeko Maya Samhali, Dream, Gaarho Bho, Intro, Zoom Zoom Boom Boom, Seto Ghoda, Yesari, and Track 13.

== Other Collaboration Hits ==
He made a song Aankha Bhari featuring rapper DA69 which was a hit in Nepal. He also featured Nabin K Bhattarai on his hit composition Yehi Ho Ta Maya from album 'May 18'.

== Solo songs ==
His other songs are:

- Ajiyo Mutu
- Bhanchhu
- Aashu yo jharcha
- Eklo yatra
- Sabai Naacha Chan
- Maya yo timilai
