= Khatra (album) =

Studio album by Yama Buddha
- Released: 2017
- Recorded: 2016
- Venue: London & Kathmandu
- Studio: Awesome Tech & T.E.C Records
- Genre: Hip hop, Music of Nepal
- Length: 18:30
- Language: Nepali
- Label: Olive Records, Ruslan FM, T.E.C Records
- Producer: Nasty (Abhishek Baniya) (exec.)

Yama Buddha chronology
Ekadesh (2012)	Khatra (2017)

Khatra is the second and last studio album by Nepalese rapper Yama Buddha. The album dealt with the themes of the incidents occurring in Nepal. All of the songs were recorded in London and was produced by Nasty (Abhishek Baniya) from TEC records.

== Track listing ==
No.	Title	Singer(s)	Length
1.	"Taaj"	Yama Buddha	3:01
2.	"Paisa"	Yama Buddha	2:48
3.	"Khatra"	Yama Buddha	2:48
4.	"Sapana"	Yama Buddha	2:35
5.	"Allarey Thita"	Yama Buddha	2:40
6.	"Yodda"	Yama Buddha	2:14
7.	"K Vako Hola"	Yama Buddha	3:44
Total length:			18:30

- Taaj (transl. fresh) described his attitude of "not caring about anyone".
- Paisa (transl. money) dealt with the themes of people and money.

== Personnel ==
- Yama Buddha - Singer
- Nasty (Abhishek Baniya) - Producer (exec.)
