= Music Nepal =

First music company of Nepal

- Native name: म्यूजिक नेपाल
- Founded: 1982
- Founder: Santosh Sharma

Music Nepal (Nepali: म्यूजिक नेपाल) is a Nepalese record label and music distribution company founded in 1982 by Santosh Sharma.

The company initially began as a recording studio equipped with advanced infrastructure for its time and focused on recording Nepali music. Music Nepal is recognized for recording one of the earliest commercially produced Nepali folk duet songs in the dohori style, a traditional musical form widely popular across rural Nepal.

In its early years, the company produced and distributed music primarily through cassette formats, with a strong emphasis on folk music from different regions of the country. As the popularity and demand for folk music grew, Music Nepal increasingly focused on promoting and preserving this genre, which has long been considered a central element of Nepal’s musical identity. Over time, the company expanded its catalog to include a wide range of musical genres.

With the shift toward digital media, Music Nepal transitioned from physical distribution to digital platforms and expanded its role as an aggregator of Nepali music worldwide. The company currently distributes music through major global services such as iTunes, Spotify, Sony Music Entertainment, and YouTube. As of 2020, Music Nepal’s YouTube channel was reported to be one of the most viewed entertainment channels originating from Nepal.

In 2016 (2074 B.S.), the company also launched its own mobile application to expand access to Nepali music through digital streaming.

In 2005 it founded a music school and research centre named Nepal Music Center in Kathmandu. The company has also published the list of its recordings.

== Significance ==
Music Nepal was the first recording company to formally pay royalties to the artists which helped to shape the music industry of Nepal. The royalty helped to change lifestyles of artists. The trend was then followed by other private recording industry. Music Nepal also helped to form copyright laws of Nepal. The company was also the first to produce Dohari geet (folk songs) in CD in 2048 BS (1991-1992).

== Major artists ==
- Black Pink
- Narayan Gopal
- Gopal Yonzon
- Udit Narayan
- Bishnu Majhi
- Hira Devi Waiba, first female artist of Music Nepal.
- Sur Sudha
- Shringara Group
- Mingma Sherpa
- Nabin Bhattarai
- Prem Raja Mahat
- Raju Lama
- Deep Shrestha
- Karna Das
- Jhalak Man Gandarbha
- Dinesh Subba
- 1974 AD
- Bhuwan Khatiwada
- Babina Bhattarai

== Awards and recognition ==
Music Nepal has historically recognized and honored artists for their contributions and commercial success in the Nepali music industry. Since its inception, the company organized an annual event known as Music Nepal Sanjh, where artists were congratulated and presented with awards based on the sales of their cassette releases. The event served as a platform to acknowledge notable achievements during the era of physical music distribution in Nepal.

With the gradual transition of the music industry from physical formats to digital platforms, the practice of awarding artists based on cassette sales declined. Nevertheless, the event remains notable as one of the early initiatives in Nepal to formally recognize the commercial success of recording artists.

A list of notable artists who have received recognition through these awards is provided below:

- Khem Raj Gurung, singer, 2056 BS
- Ratna Samsher Thapa, songwriter, 2076 BS
- Kiran Kharel, songwriter, 2076 BS
- Deepak Jangum, musician, 2076 BS
- Sambhujit Baskota, musician, 2076 BS

== Controversies ==
In 2018 Nephop artist VTEN recreated an old folk song simsime pani which even became most viewed Nepali Song in a week but later was deleted as Music Nepal Claimed the license
