= Nepalese hip-hop =

Form of dance and music in Nepal

Nep-hop is the Nepalese form of hip-hop, performed by Nepalese artists and artists with Nepalese descent. This form of hip-hop became known in the early 1990s as a subculture heavily influenced by American rap. It has since evolved into a cultural and political force used by the youth of the country to bring unity and awareness, characterized by the blending of Nepali folk music.

Its major elements include alternative hip hop, avant-garde hip hop, breakbeat, freestyling and DJing. Rap culture was introduced in Nepal through electronic DJs mixing the classical Nepalese songs with influences from the Western urban style. Later, it took the form of artists releasing songs with commercial beats in the 1990s.

== Notable people ==
- Yama Buddha
- Girish Khatiwada
- VTEN
- Laure (Nepalese rapper)
- Pranil L Timalsena
- Nirnaya Shrestha
- Manas Ghale
- Balen

== See also ==
- Music of Nepal
