= Shuklagandaki =

Municipality in Gandaki Pradesh, Nepal

Shuklagandaki Municipality शुक्लगण्डकी नगरपालिका
- Municipality
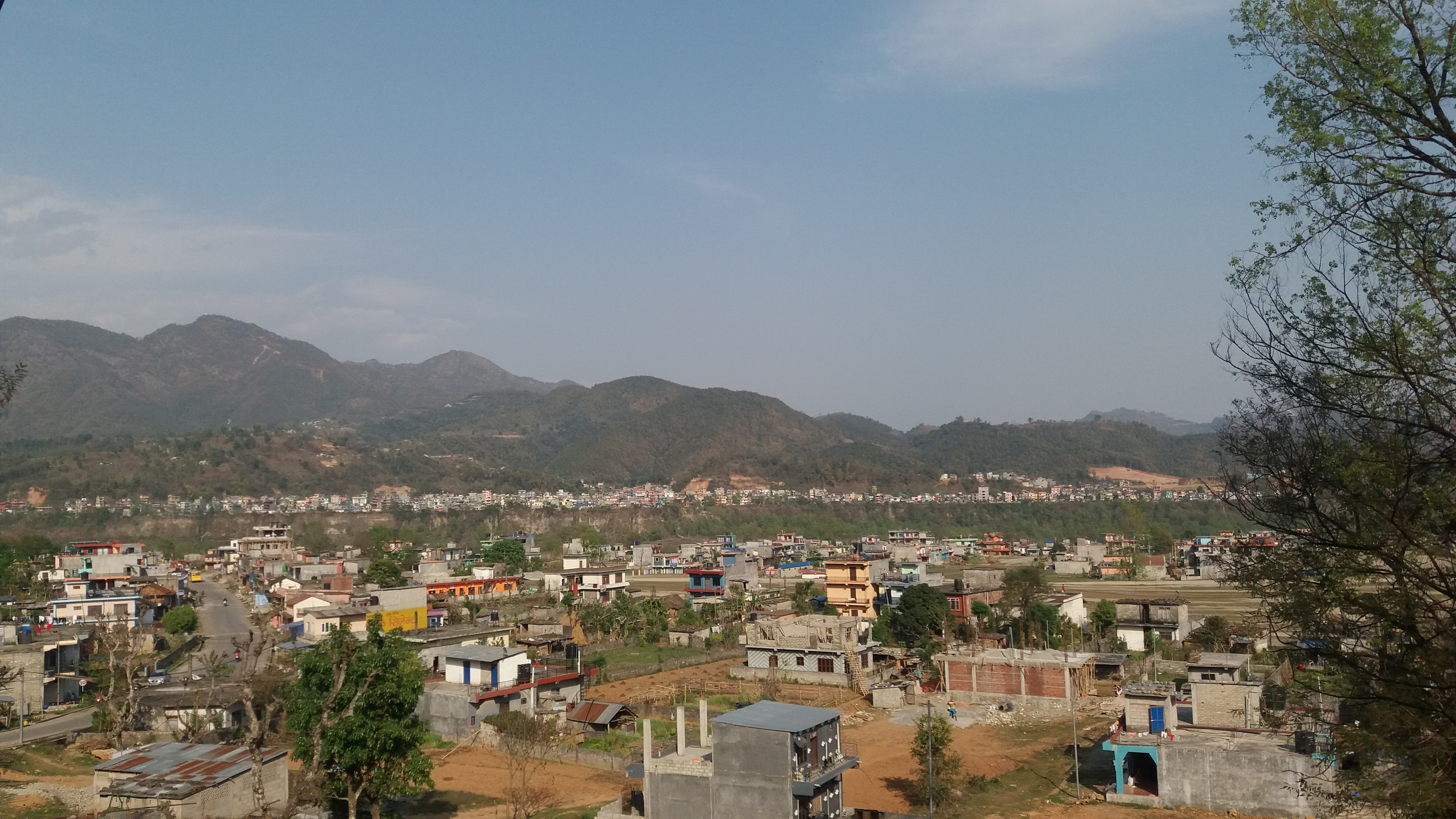
- view of Shuklagandaki Municipality
- Motto(s): Tourism, Agriculture and Infrastructure is the base of rich Shuklagandaki
- Location in Nepal Shuklagandaki Municipality (Nepal)
- Coordinates: 28.07°N 84.09°E
- Country: Nepal
- Zone: Gandaki Province
- District: Tanahun District

Government
  - Type: Mayor–council
  - Mayor: Krishna Raj Pandit (NC)
  - Deputy Mayor: Khum Bahadur Bk (Raju) (NCP)

Population (2011)
  - Total: 48,456
- Time zone: UTC+5:45 (NST)
- Website: shuklagandakimun.gov.np

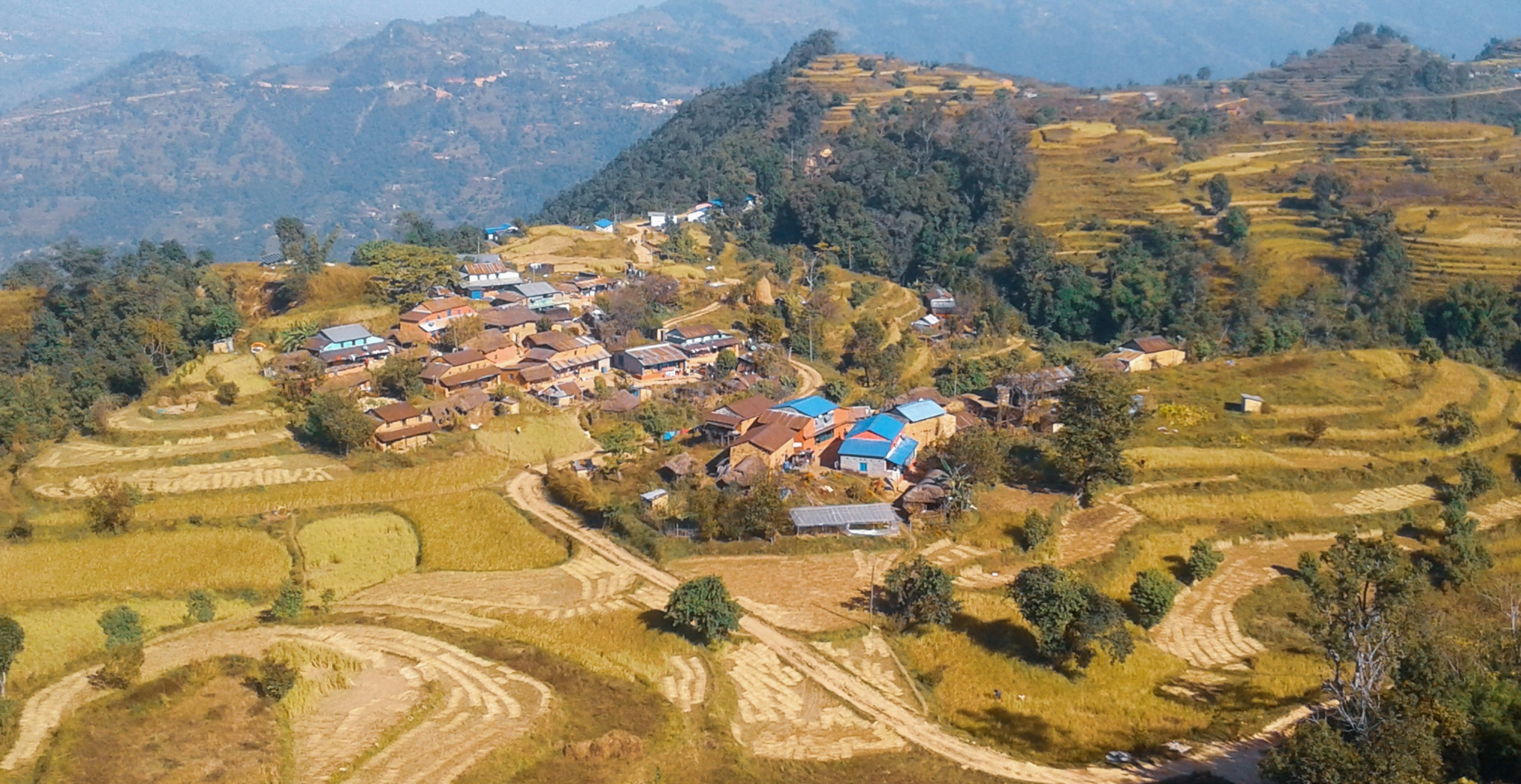
Scenario from Bhujikot Tower in Shuklagandaki

Shuklagandaki (Nepali: शुक्लगण्डकी) is a municipality located in Tanahu District of Gandaki Province in the Western Development Region, Nepal. The municipality was formed on 18 May 2014. It was formed by merging three Village Development Committees: Dhorphirdi, Dulegaunda and Khairenitar. And further more Thaprek, Raipur and Phirphire VDC are merged on 5 March 2017.

This municipality has a high religious value. Dhorbarahi, one of the most famous goddess temples, is located in just a few kilometers far away from Dhorphirdi. Several small famous Hindu temples are located in this municipality. Along with the temples, it also has a Church and a Mosque.

Prithvi Highway goes through this Municipality. Several small roadways are connected to the main cities like Dulegaunda, Khairenitar, Kotre, etc.

At the time of 2011 Nepal Census, it had a population of 37,109. After addition of Thaprek, Raipur and Phirphire VDCs on 5 March 2017 population of Shuklagandaki Municipality 45456 as of 2011 census

== Demographics ==
At the time of the 2011 Nepal census, Shuklagandaki Municipality had a population of 49,611. Of these, 74.2% spoke Nepali, 10.4% Gurung, 8.9% Magar, 2.7% Newar, 1.2% Urdu, 0.4% Bhojpuri, 0.4% Kumhali, 0.3% Kham, 0.3% Tamang, 0.2% Hindi, 0.2% Rai, 0.2% Tharu, 0.1% Lhoba, 0.1% Thakali and 0.1% other languages as their first language.

In terms of ethnicity/caste, 18.0% were Magar, 17.9% Hill Brahmin, 13.5% Gurung, 12.4% Chhetri, 10.3% Kami, 6.6% Newar, 3.5% Damai/Dholi, 3.4% Kumal, 3.3% Thakuri, 2.8% Gharti/Bhujel, 2.5% Sarki, 1.7% Musalman, 0.8% Tamang, 0.7% Sanyasi/Dasnami, 0.6% Rai, 0.3% other Dalit, 0.2% Badi, 0.2% Sunuwar, 0.2% Tharu, 0.2% Yadav, 0.1% Lhoba, 0.1% Thakali and 0.2% others.

In terms of religion, 84.4% were Hindu, 9.9% Buddhist, 2.1% Bon, 1.7% Muslim, 1.3% Christianity, 0.2% Prakriti and 0.4% others.

In terms of literacy, 78.8% could read and write, 1.5% could only read and 19.7% could neither read nor write.

== Climate ==
Climate data for Shuklagandaki (Khairini Tar), elevation 515 m (1,690 ft), (1991–2020 normals)
Month	Jan	Feb	Mar	Apr	May	Jun	Jul	Aug	Sep	Oct	Nov	Dec	Year
Mean daily maximum °C (°F)	21.4 (70.5)	24.9 (76.8)	29.9 (85.8)	33.0 (91.4)	33.1 (91.6)	33.4 (92.1)	32.8 (91.0)	33.0 (91.4)	32.1 (89.8)	30.0 (86.0)	25.8 (78.4)	21.9 (71.4)	29.3 (84.7)
Daily mean °C (°F)	14.9 (58.8)	17.6 (63.7)	21.5 (70.7)	24.8 (76.6)	26.6 (79.9)	28.1 (82.6)	28.5 (83.3)	28.6 (83.5)	27.5 (81.5)	24.6 (76.3)	20.1 (68.2)	16.1 (61.0)	23.2 (73.8)
Mean daily minimum °C (°F)	8.4 (47.1)	10.2 (50.4)	13.1 (55.6)	16.6 (61.9)	20.1 (68.2)	22.8 (73.0)	24.2 (75.6)	24.1 (75.4)	22.9 (73.2)	19.2 (66.6)	14.3 (57.7)	10.3 (50.5)	17.2 (62.9)
Average precipitation mm (inches)	21.2 (0.83)	25.0 (0.98)	37.5 (1.48)	111.4 (4.39)	327.5 (12.89)	448.3 (17.65)	554.1 (21.81)	438.4 (17.26)	267.3 (10.52)	71.2 (2.80)	17.2 (0.68)	22.5 (0.89)	2,363.6 (93.06)
Source 1: Department of Hydrology and Meteorology
Source 2: Agricultural Extension in South Asia (precipitation 1976–2005)

== Religious Sites in Shuklagandaki ==
1. Dhorbarahi Temple — View on Google Maps
2. Teen Kholey Devi Temple — View on Google Maps
3. Taklung Kagyu Domsumling Monastery — View on Google Maps
4. Gaushiya Jama Masjid — View on Google Maps

== Educational Institutions in Shuklagandaki Municipality ==
- Bhanubhakta Multiple Campus (Bachelor to Master) (Affiliated to Tribhuvan University) (Operated by government of Nepal)
- KHAIRENI HIGH SCHOOL,KHAIRENITAR
- SURYODAYA ENGLISH BOARDING SCHOOL,KHAIRENITAR
- MOUNT ANNAPURNA ACADEMY,KHAIRENITAR
- SHREE SARASWOTI MODEL SECONDARY SCHOOL,KHAIRENITAR
- MODERN INTERNATIONAL ACADEMY,KHAIRENITAR
- NEPAL POLICE SCHOOL, BELCHAUTARA
- Amar Jyoti Secondary School, Thaprek ( Government)
- Jeev Juna Secondary School, Ganapati
- Shree Pashupati Primary School, Thutepipal
- ARANIKO BOARDING SCHOOL,KHAIRENITAR
- Sahid Karishna Collage (Government)
- Bright Future School
- Panchamunidev Secondary School (Basic to +2 Level) (Operated by government of Nepal)
- Gyan Bagaichaa English Boarding School
- Gaufarkodaya Secondary School (Operated by government of Nepal)
- Little Garden English Boarding School (Private School) (Basic to SEE)
- Araniko English Boarding Secondary School (Private School) (Basic to +2 Level)
- Shree Chhabdi Secondary School. Deurali
