= Dhorphirdi =

Coordinates: 28°3′N 84°4′E

Dhorphirdi ढोरफिर्दी Lalim, Ganapati, Patan, Center chowk, Phirdi, Laharepipal
- linear settlement
- Location in Nepal Dhorphirdi (Nepal)
- Country: Nepal
- Zone: Gandaki Zone
- District: Tanahu District

Population (1991)
  - Total: 10,433
- Time zone: UTC+5:45 (Nepal Time)

Dhorphirdi is a town and market center in Shuklagandaki Municipality in Tanahu District in the Gandaki Zone of central Nepal. The formerly Village Development Committee was merged to form the new municipality since 18 May 2014. At the time of the 1991 Nepal census it had a population of 10,433 people living in 1915 individual households.
