= Girish Khatiwada =

Nepalese rapper (born 1979)

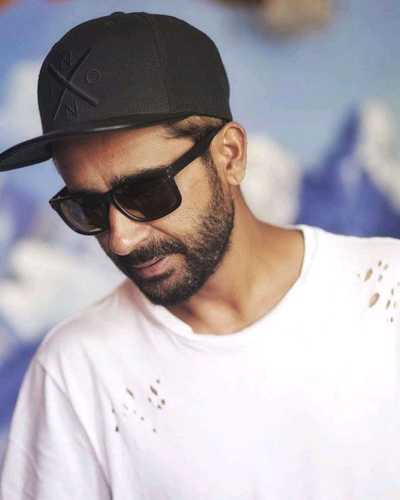
- Born: 30 August 1979 (age 47); Biratnagar, Nepal
- Other name: Gorkhali G
- Education: University of Phoenix (MBA)
- Occupations: Rapper; radio artist; television personality; vlogger
- Years active: 1993–present
- Children: 1
- Musical career
- Also known as: GP
- Origin: Kathmandu, Nepal
- Genres: Hip hop; Nephop
- Labels: Music Nepal; Superstar Entertainment; Asian Music

Girish Khatiwada (born 30 August 1979) is a Nepalese rapper, radio, television personality, and vlogger. He is consistently cited as the first rapper of Nepal and was labeled the "Godfather of Nephop" by The Diplomat Magazine. Khatiwada started his career at the age of 15 with his first track "Meaningless Rap" in 1994 and became mainstream with his counterpart Pranil Timalsena with other tracks like “ Ma yesto chu”Timi Jaha Pani Jaanchhau, Malai Bhot Deu, Hami Dherai Sana Chhu. Today, besides his career in the Nepalese rap music scene, Khatiwada is also one of the most influential vloggers from Nepal.

== Life and career ==
Girish Khatiwada was born on August 30, 1979, in Biratnagar, Nepal. In an interview with The Kathmandu Post, Girish said that he was introduced to hip hop music of the west in early 1990s when he was involved in break dancing in Dharan. His first introduction of hip-hop came from a cousin whose parents worked in the Nepali embassy in Washington.

In 1994, at the age of 15, Girish wrote and recorded the first hip-hop song, Meaningless Rap. According to Girish, the song was named so because he initially struggled to understand the obscure slang in English hip hop which he presumed were written and sang only to rhyme and didn't have any meaning. After a moderate success, he was approached by a local record label to produce a full album. This resulted in a team of Girish and Pranil, who were later known by their moniker GP.

During the late 90s, GP took inspiration for their music from the instrumental parts of American hip-hop who would then incorporate traditional Nepali folk song with the help of Nepali audio engineers. This led to the formation of a new Nepali music genre "Nep hop" in the late 90s, which he later named "Lok Hop."

Khatiwada took a break from Nepali hip hop to continue his higher studies in United States in 2008. He came back to Nepal in 2013 to continue his career in music, radio, television and YouTube.

== Personal life ==
Khatiwada is currently married to his longtime girlfriend Jyoti Ranabhat.

== Songs ==
- Meaningless Rap
- Ma Yesto Chu Ma Testo Chu feat. DA69
- Gharo Bho (Feat. Nabin K Bhattarai)
- Timi Jaha Pani Janchau
- Malai Vote Deu
- Seto Ghoda
- Come Back into My Life
- Back Again
- Paisa Ko Saukheen
- Miss Kollywood
- Be What You Wanna Be
- Oi Hoi
- Prithivi Narayan Shah
- Best in Me
- Timilai Napai Chaddina
- Number 1 Girl
- Imma Live My Life
- Sadak Ko Army
- Sakina Maile
- Jitney Ko Itihaas
- Kehi Lagdaina
- Kathmandu Ma Trapped
- Ganja Man
- Baluwatar Singhadurwar
- Euta Banda Kotha
- Haami Dherai Saana Chhau
- Jati Maya
- Lok Hop
- Prithvi Narayan Shah
- Aag Laagi
