= Next What's In =

Indian self-help book

- Author: Santosh Sharma
- Language: English
- Genre: Non-fiction
- Publisher: CAS Research Wing
- Publication date: 2010
- Publication place: India
- Pages: 334 pp
- ISBN: 978-81-920520-0-7
- OCLC: 728526585

Next What's In is a management and self-help book that introduces "Dissolve the box" as an idea, strategy and way of life. It was written by Santosh Sharma and was published by CAS Research Wing in 2010.

== Premise and background ==
The book's premise deals with the idea of dissolving the box, mental biases and limitations. The idea claims that traditional "thinking out of the box" is flawed, and that one must "dissolve the box" in order to escape pre-formed and stereotypical thoughts. In this book the author compels the reader to leap beyond the axioms that bound one's creativity. Next What's In argues that social and professional evils like rape, corruption, mental or physical pollution, and all under-performance are a result of the Gang of 5 internal villains called LFEAD i.e. Limited self understanding, Fear, Ego, Attachment and Dominant mind.

According to the author a real leader first leads himself and then aligns all conflicting desires to influence people in achieving the intended goal. The author believes that a real leader is spiritually awakened and he practices universal spiritual laws. The book was a result of the discussions the author had with his colleagues and friends when discussing and correlating everyday experiences with the teachings of Gita, Kuran and Bible.

== About the book ==
The book is divided into four parts

1. Foundation
2. Concepts
3. Practical Implications
4. Designing the Future

== Dissolve the box ==
Dissolve the box is a concept discussed in the book where box means mental cages that hold us back. Dissolve the box means dissolving our mental cages to respond from the field of freedom and not compulsion. Presented as being different from thinking outside the box, it has been applied in various organizations, sports clubs, and academic institutions like IIM Ranchi.

Sharma writes that dissolving the biases, limitations and boxes will give new perspectives to the present understanding of growth and leadership. He says this idea helps in inclusive and sustainable growth for better life and better world. Thinking out of the box means the thoughts are still driven by the Gang of 5 internal villains with only a bit more freedom in comparison to when we think inside the box. Contrary to thinking out of the box which focuses only on external growth, Sharma writes that this idea is to bring about a congruency between the inner and outer growth, being more holistic in its approach.

Sharma explains this concept by giving an analogy of a corrupt/thief where thinking out of the box would make him a better corrupt/thief as he finds new ways to manipulate laws as he still thinks from the platform of being a corrupt/thief because of his limited self-understanding. In thinking out of the box the reference of the box still remains. As the corrupt/thief dissolves his boxes, he realizes that he is not just a corrupt/thief but it is just a limited understanding of himself and with this realization he also gets the intelligence to change. This is not just an incremental but a radical shift.

Sharma writes that individuals and organizations receive, process and respond from internal biases, boxes and traps, just as did the corrupt/thief in the example. He says that thinking out of the box will simply take them further in the wrong direction because the reference of being a corrupt/thief still guides.

Sharma explains his concept through the DTB Framework and explains ways to move from the Field of Compulsion to the Field of Freedom. Through GOLFCUP he measures and improves the Growth Parameters, Organizational fit, Leadership parameters, Future readiness, Coping mechanisms, Universal relevance and Performance parameters.

== Reception ==
Critical reception for Next What's In has been positive, with The Hindu calling it "interesting and engaging". Businessworld praised the book's "simple and lucid" language and presentation.

== About Santosh Sharma ==
Santosh is a mentor to entrepreneurs and is a public speaker on issues like entrepreneurship, innovation and sustainability with a focus on green economy. At TEDxKanke Countdown talk he shared his idea of "7H to Sustainsbility which revolves around hunger, health, hope, happiness, humanity, hariyali (greenery) and healing innovations.

Santosh is the founder of "The Happy Tribe" and is working on improving the baseline of happiness for the world. He is empowering people with the science and art of manufacturing happiness and bringing more smiles per person.
