= Prem Raja Mahat =

Nepalese folk singer

- प्रेमराजा महत
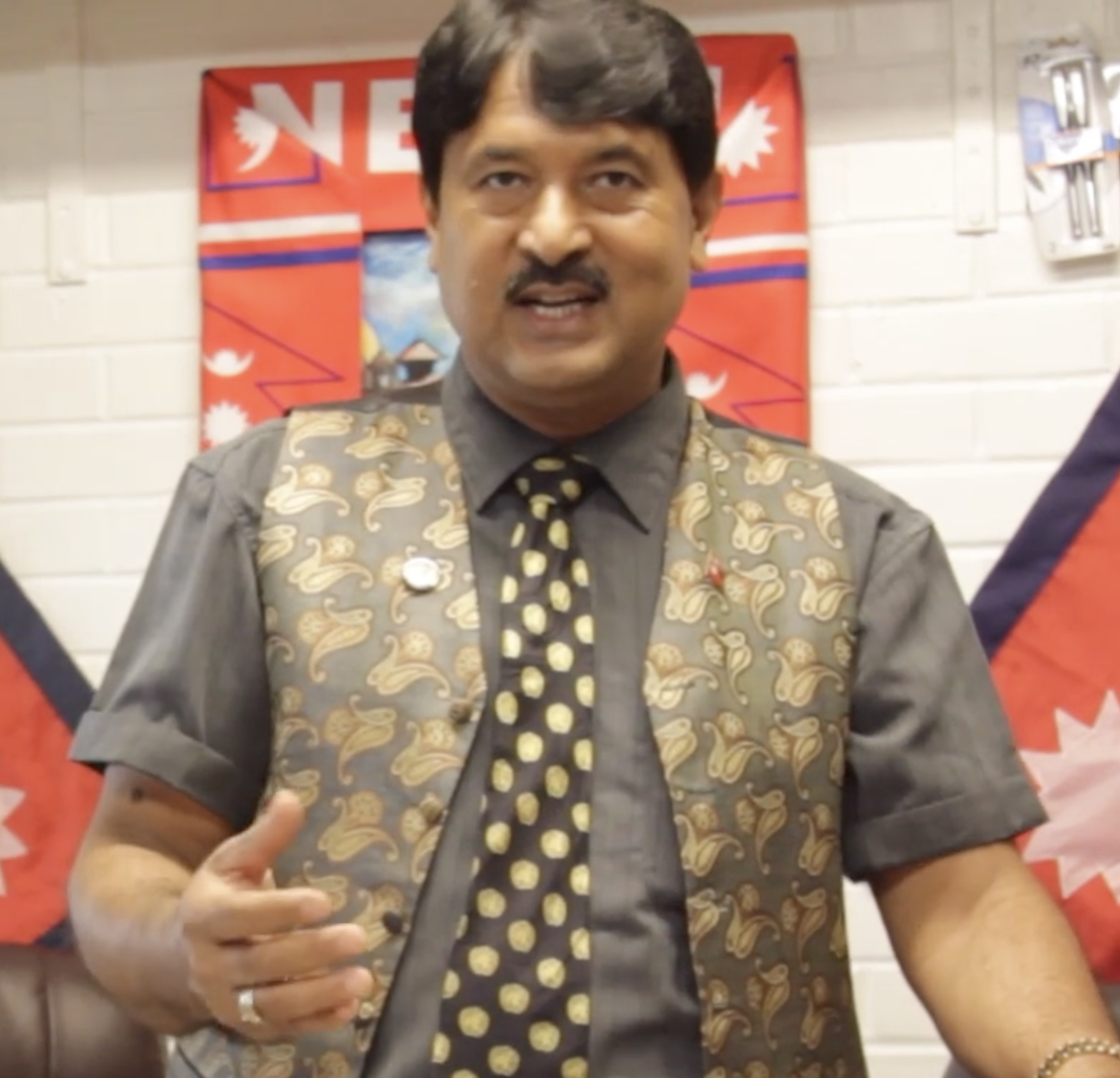
- Mahat giving interview to Baltimore magazine in 2017
- Born: September 22; Tanahun, Nepal
- Occupations: Singer; songwriter
- Years active: 1978–present
- Spouse: Kabita Mahat (m. 1987)
- Children: 4
- Musical career
- Genres: Folk
- Instruments: Vocals; sarangi; madal; harmonium; bansuri
- Labels: Music Nepal; Radio Nepal

Prem Raja Mahat (Nepali: प्रेमराजा महत) is a Nepalese folk singer. He has sung songs like Bajho Khet Ma, Paan Ko Paat, Balla Paryo Nirmaya, and Simsime Panima, which are considered timeless Nepali classics. He is also renowned for playing sarangi, a traditional instrument from Nepal used primarily in folk music.

Along with another well-known artist in Nepali folk music, Bam Bahadur Karki, he sang Khola Pari Nirmaya, Music Nepal's first folk song which was released in 1986. Additionally, he has sung for Nepali feature films, such as Paat Bajaune Mayalai for the 2005 film Muglan. Due to his prominence in Nepali music, he is often compared to well-known artists like Elvis Presley in the western world.

== Personal life ==
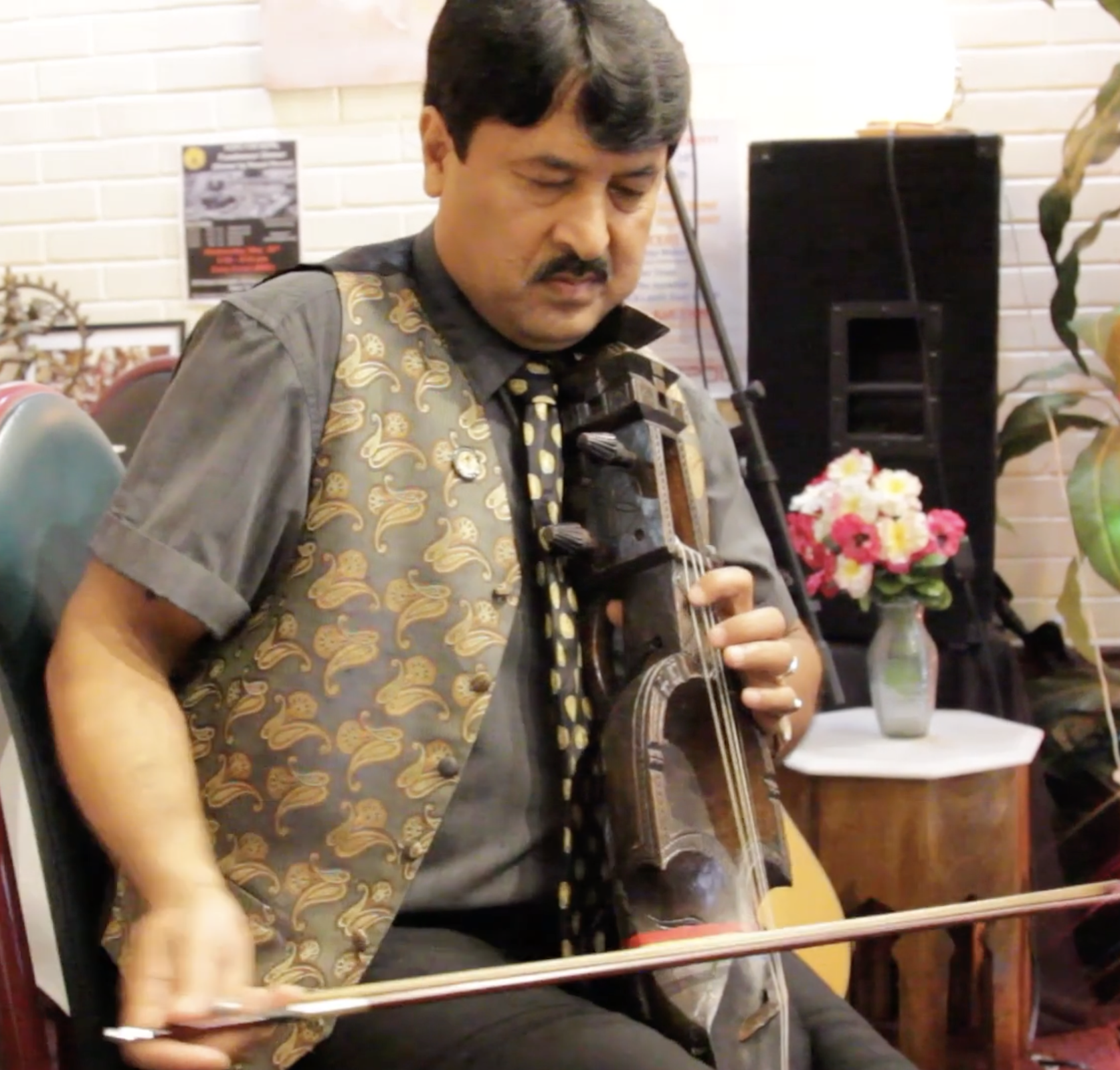
Mahat playing sarangi

Prem Raja Mahat was born in Dhorphirdi, Tanahun, Nepal. He lost both of his parents when he was very young; his mother at the age of seven and his father at the age of nine. He married Kabita Mahat in 1987. He immigrated to the United States in 1996, when he was 33 years old. Later, in 2001, his family joined him in the States. He also owns a Nepali restaurant in Baltimore. He continued to contribute new Nepali folk music after relocating to the States, such as the well-liked 2021 song Maya Bandipuraima.

Mahat plays the sarangi, madal, and harmonium, the first two of which are indigenous Nepalese instruments.

== Career ==
Mahat first sang for the radio in 1978, and his first song was also recorded in the same year. His first song was Tara Khaseko, which was a hit. His songs gained immense popularity in the late 1980s and the 1990s; since then he has been active in Nepali folk music. Because of his contribution towards Nepali folk music, he has earned recognition among the Nepali people.

In 2022, singer Rekha Shah accused Mahat for stealing her song Simsime Panima, which was sung by the two of them. Shah filed a petition in Music Nepal where she claimed she is the lyricist and the producer of the song therefore holds the copyright of the song, but Mahat did not gave her the credits, and released it as it were only his work. She also claimed she originally sang the song solo on Radio Nepal singing competition, where she met Mahat, who requested her to sing it together and release it.

== Selected discography ==
Mahat has released over 59 albums, and many singles. Only a small number of his albums are represented in the list below.

- Aakasaima Joon
- Hiunchuli Ma Hiun
- Mutu Ko Dhadkan
- Gaaumai Ramailo
- Phool Phulyo Sanhila
- Mayale Taana Rasile
- Bajho Khetma
- Panko Paat, Vol. 1
- Sannani
- Simsime Panima
- Salaiko Paataile
- Phool Fulyo Sahila
- Dautari
- Chari Himalma
- Trisulima Bhel
- Bandipuraima

== See also ==
- Dohori
- Music of Nepal

== Bibliography ==
- Lee, Jonathan H. X.; Nadeau, Kathleen M. (2011). Encyclopedia of Asian American folklore and folklife. Vol. 2. Santa Barbara, California: ABC-CLIO. ISBN 978-0-313-35067-2. OCLC 701335337. Archived from the original on August 4, 2022.
- Stirr, Anna Marie (2017). Singing Across Divides: Music and Intimate Politics in Nepal (1st ed.). Oxford, England: Oxford University Press. ISBN 978-0-190-63200-7. OCLC 983824640. Archived from the original on August 4, 2022.
