= Manas Ghale =

Nepalese rapper

- Also known as: Loorey
- Born: Manas Ghale; October 19, 1984 (age 41); Kathmandu, Nepal
- Genres: Hip hop
- Occupations: Rapper, singer, songwriter
- Years active: 2000–present

Manas Ghale (Nepali: मानस घले; born October 19, 1975) is a Nepalese rapper, singer and songwriter. He started his career in the year 2000.

== Awards and nominations ==
- Won: Kantipur FM Awards
- Won: Image FM Awards

== Discography ==
- Sukeko Jiu Ma Loorey ko Bal
- Manasick Medicine
- Malai Maan Pardaina Timro Rap

== Tours ==
- India
- Hong Kong
- South Korea
- Dubai
- Australia
- USA
- United Kingdom
- Germany
- Japan
