= The Voice of Nepal season 1 =

The Voice of Nepal
- Season 1
- Hosted by: Sushil Nepal; Oshin Sitaula
- Coaches: Deep Shrestha; Sanup Paudel; Abhaya Subba; Pramod Kharel
- Winner: CD krishna Adhikari
- Winning coach: Deep Shrestha
- Runners-up: Kushal Acharya, Shrijay Thapaliya and Saptak Durtraj
- Finals venue: Qatar

Release
- Original network: Kantipur Television; Ramailo HD
- Original release: 25 August – 14 December 2018

The winner of the first season of The Voice of Nepal was CD Vijaya Adhikari from Team Deep. The runner-ups were Shrijay Thapaliya, Kushal Acharya and Saptak Durtraj from Team Pramod, Team Sanup and Team Aabhaya respectively. The finale of the season one was held in Qatar, on December 14, 2018.

The audition for the show (season 1) was taken using The Voice of Nepal app for iOS and Android. In total, 12,000 digital clips were received within 30 days, and it took 20 more days to select 108 participants, among whom, some of them are Non Resident Nepali from Japan, Australia, Dubai, and India.

The first episode was broadcast on Kantipur TV and on Ramailo HD on 25 August 2018. The show times are every Saturday and Sunday 9:00 pm (NPT) onward.

== Blind auditions ==
=== Episode 1 (August 25) ===
Color key

✔	Coach pressed "I WANT YOU" button
	Artist defaulted to a coach's team
	Artist elected a coach's team
	Artist eliminated with no coach pressing their button

Order	Artist	Age	Hometown	Song	Coach's and artist's choices			
Order	Artist	Age	Hometown	Song	Pramod	Sanup	Abhaya	Deep
1	Apsara Ghimire	22	Udayapur, Nepal	"Timi Aayeu"	—	✔	—	✔
2	Aarif Rauf	28	Kathmandu, Nepal	"Maya Ka Badal"	—	—	—	—
3	Sushil Gartaula	25	Kathmandu, Nepal	"Raag Hamsadhwani"	✔	✔	✔	✔
4	Yester Century	23	Dharan, Nepal	"Kata Hideko"	—	—	—	—
5	Anu Shakya	21	Kathmandu, Nepal	"Ko Ho Tyo Jasle Malai"	✔	✔	✔	—
6	Aashish Gubaju	25	Kathmandu, Nepal	"Nachaheko Hoina Timilai"	✔	✔	✔	✔

=== Episode 2 (August 26) ===
Order	Artist	Age	Hometown	Song	Coach's and artist's choices			
Order	Artist	Age	Hometown	Song	Pramod	Sanup	Abhaya	Deep
1	CD Vijaya Adhikari	26	Pokhara, Nepal	"Daiba Hey"	✔	—	✔	—
2	Annie Shrestha	29	Kathmandu, Nepal	"Guras Fulda"	✔	✔	—	✔
3	Kamal Baraili	32	Itahari, Nepal	"Aba Yo Bato"	—	—	—	—
4	Shrijay Thapaliya	25	Biratnagar, Nepal	"Nischal"	—	—	✔	—
5	Santosh Rana	25	Butwal, Nepal	"Herda Ramro"	✔	✔	✔	✔
6	Rupesh Parajuli	33	Kakarvitta, Nepal	"K Yo Maya Ho"	✔	—	—	—
7	Dambar Hingmang	24	Itahari, Nepal	"Jumke Bhulaki”	—	—	—	—

=== Episode 3 (September 1) ===
Order	Artist	Age	Hometown	Song	Coach's and artist's choices			
Order	Artist	Age	Hometown	Song	Pramod	Sanup	Abhaya	Deep
1	Nawaraj Sapkota	25	Lalitpur, Nepal	"Raag Puriya Dhanashree"	✔	✔	✔	✔
2	Surekha Chhetri	28	Guwahati, India	"Kusume Rumal"	✔	—	—	✔
3	Bibek Pariyar	22	Birgunj, Nepal	"Lolayalka Ti Thula"	—	—	—	✔
4	Aashma Adhikari	18	Dharan, Nepal	"Chayechha Basanta"	—	—	—	—
5	Tejendra Gandarbha	28	Bhojpur, Nepal	"Bar Kadai Le"	✔	✔	—	✔
6	Santosh Kalikote	31	Biratnagar, Nepal	"K Bhanu Ma Kaso Gari Pare"	—	—	—	—
7	Ashra Kunwar	24	Lalitpur, Nepal	"Whole Lotta Love”	✔	✔	✔	—

=== Episode 4 (September 2) ===
Order	Artist	Age	Hometown	Song	Coach's and artist's choices			
Order	Artist	Age	Hometown	Song	Pramod	Sanup	Abhaya	Deep
1	Rajesh Balkoti	21	Pokhara, Nepal	"U Jitera Gai"	—	✔	—	✔
2	Mingma Lama	20	Hetauda, Nepal	"Pal Pal Timrai Samjhana Ma"	—	—	—	—
3	Pratisha Rasaili	25	New Delhi, India	"Tulsi Aagan Ma Ropaula"	—	—	✔	—
4	Ankit Amaru Shrestha	22	Butwal, Nepal	"Parelima"	—	—	—	✔
5	Preshya Lamsal	17	Dang, Nepal	"Bahar Sangai Udayo Man"	—	—	—	—
6	Yogendra Upadhyay	35	Jhapa, Nepal	"Mero Aakhamaa Bhardin"	✔	✔	✔	✔
7	Sannidha Thapa	22	Siliguri, India	"Blown Away"	—	—	✔	—

==== Episode 5 (September 8) ====
Order	Artist	Age	Hometown	Song	Coach's and artist's choices			
Order	Artist	Age	Hometown	Song	Pramod	Sanup	Abhaya	Deep
1	Mohan Dutraj	47	Kathmandu, Nepal	"Yeti Chokho..."	—	—	—	—
2	Saptak Dutraj	26	Kathmandu, Nepal	"Aankhama Timilai"	✔	✔	—	—
3	Bidhya Tiwari	24	Hetauda, Nepal	"Maan"	✔	✔	✔	✔
4	Karan Dong	20	Jorpati, Nepal	"Thinking Out Loud"	—	—	—	—
5	Bibek Waiba Lama	24	Kathmandu, Nepal	"Despacito"	✔	—	✔	✔
6	Subash Gandarbha	27	Bhojpur, Nepal	"Thunche Ko Bhari"	—	—	✔	—
7	Swechchha Thakuri	22	Bhairahawa, Nepal	"Jhaile Samma Sansar Ma"	✔	—	—	—

==== Episode 6 (September 9) ====
Order	Artist	Age	Hometown	Song	Coach's and artist's choices			
Order	Artist	Age	Hometown	Song	Pramod	Sanup	Abhaya	Deep
1	Manoj Limbu	29	Jhapa, Nepal	"Paisa Haina"	—	—	—	—
2	Kushal Acharya	20	Kakarvitta, Nepal	"Sundarta Ko Timi Udadaran"	—	—	✔	—
3	Suraj Tamang	23	Dharan, Nepal	"Malai Chuney Mero Hune"	✔	—	—	—
4	Shreya Rai	18	Dhankuta, Nepal	"Don't Let Me Down"	✔	✔	✔	✔
5	Sandip Pariyar	24	Gorkha, Nepal	"Suna Katha Euta Geet"	—	—	—	✔
6	Shantim Koirala	28	Okhaldhunga, Nepal	"Aadha Umer"	—	—	—	—
7	Zanak Tamrakar	23	Dadeldhura, Nepal	"Sa Karnali"	—	—	✔	✔

==== Episode 7 (September 15) ====
Order	Artist	Age	Hometown	Song	Coach's and artist's choices			
Order	Artist	Age	Hometown	Song	Pramod	Sanup	Abhaya	Deep
1	Anu Dhakal	25	Kathmandu, Nepal	"Dali Dali Ful Fulyo"	—	—	—	—
2	Prasan Pariyar	27	Lalitpur, Nepal	"Ma Ta Door Dekhi Aaye"	—	—	—	—
3	Barta Gandarba	32	Bhojpur, Nepal	"Hey Meri Aama"	✔	✔	✔	✔
4	Rajesh Khatri	19	Japan	"Chahanchu Timilai"	—	—	—	—
5	Dinesh Neupane	32	Lalbandi, Nepal	"Kassari ma bhule"	✔	✔	✔	✔
6	Sujata Thapa	20	Dhading, Nepal	"Shape of You"	—	—	—	✔
7	Nishant Dahal	21	Jhapa, Nepal	"Ke chha ra Diu"	—	✔	—	—

==== Episode 8 (September 16) ====
Order	Artist	Age	Hometown	Song	Coach's and artist's choices			
Order	Artist	Age	Hometown	Song	Pramod	Sanup	Abhaya	Deep
1	Santosh Ghale Gurunq	25	Chitwan, Nepal	"Dukha Diyera Ta"	—	—	✔	—
2	Junu Gautam	36	Siliguri, India	"Paaniko foka"	—	—	—	—
3	Raju Pant	26	Palpa, Nepal	"Tolairahe"	✔	—	—	✔
6	Sudip Jairu	N/A	Nepal	"Nai Na Bhannu La"	—	—	—	—
4	Sugama Gautam	19	Kathmandu, Nepal	"Raag Bihag"	✔	—	✔	—
5	Deepak Sapkota	22	Jhapa, Nepal	"Pheri Pheri Timile Malai"	—	✔	—	—
7	Saileshwory Singh	20	Dhangadhi, Nepal	"Ali Ali"	✔	✔	✔	✔

==== Episode 9 (September 22) ====
Order	Artist	Age	Hometown	Song	Coach's and artist's choices			
Order	Artist	Age	Hometown	Song	Pramod	Sanup	Abhaya	Deep
1	Benisha Poudel	17	Jhapa, Nepal	"Timi Bahek Mero"	—	—	—	—
2	Raju Tamang	36	Chandragiri, Nepal	"Biteka Kura"	✔	✔	✔	✔
3	Amit Thapa Magar	19	Morang, Nepal	"Shisir Jahi Ritto"	—	—	—	—
4	Sunanda Dhakal	26	Sindhupalchowk, Nepal	"Kati Kura Nabhanera"	—	✔	—	—
5	Vivek Lama	28	Lalitpur, Nepal	"Malai Maaf Garideu"	✔	✔	✔	✔
6	Reet Rana Magar	22	Birgunj, Nepal	"Jaba Sandhya Hunchha"	—	✔	—	—
7	Salina Ramudamu	20	Darjeeling, India	"Haru Sita Maile"	—	—	✔	—

==== Episode 10 (September 23) ====
Order	Artist	Age	Hometown	Song	Coach's and artist's choices			
Order	Artist	Age	Hometown	Song	Pramod	Sanup	Abhaya	Deep
1	Rahu Bishwas	23	Kathmandu, Nepal	"Bhana Timro Maan Ma"	✔	✔	✔	✔
2	Dipesh Lama	20	Gorkha, Nepal	"Ishwor Taile Rachera"	—	—	—	✔
3	Ankit Babu Adhikari	28	Kathmandu, Nepal	"Sawari Mero Railaima"	✔	✔	✔	Team Full
4	Jyovan Bhuju	18	Kathmandu, Nepal	"Maya Jalaima"		—	✔	Team Full
5	Sonam Lama	33	Kathmandu, Nepal	"I Feel Good"				Team Full
6	Anish Shrestha	24	Jhapa, Nepal	"Mero Geet Merai Pratimbimba"				Team Full

=== Coaches' teams ===
Winning coach; winners are denoted by boldface.

Season	Team Sanup	Team Pramod	Team Deep	Team Abhaya
1	Apsara Ghimire, Udayapur; Ashish Gubaju, Kathmandu; Santosh Rana, Butwal; Rajesh Balkoti, Pokhara; Saptak Dutraj, Kathmandu; Bidhya Tiwari, Kathmandu	Sushil Gartaula, Kathmandu; CD Vijaya Adhikari, Pokhara; Rupesh Parajuli, Kakarvitta; Surekha Chhetri, Guwahati; Tejendra Gandarbha, Bhojpur; Yogendra Upadhyay, Jhapa; Swechchha T., Bhairahawa; Suraj Tamang, Dharan	Annie Shrestha, Kathmandu; Nawaraj Sapkota, Lalitpur; Bibek Pariyar, Birgunj; Ankit Amaru Shrestha, Butwal; Bibek Lama, Kathmandu; Sandip Pariyar, Gorkha; Zanak Tamrakar, Dadeldhura	Anu Shakya, Kathmandu; Shrijay Thapaliya, Biratnagar; Ashra Kunwar, Lalitpur; Pratisha Rasaili, New Delhi; Sannidha Thapa, Siliguri; Subash Gandarbha, Bhojpur; Kushal Acharya, Kakarvitta; Shreya Rai, Dhankuta

== The Battles ==
Color key:

Artist won the Battle and advanced to the Live Shows
Artist lost the Battle but was stolen by another coach and advanced to Live Shows
Artist lost the Battle and was eliminated

Episode	Coach	Order	Winner	Song	Loser	'Steal' Result			
Episode	Coach	Order	Winner	Song	Loser	Pramod	Sanup	Abhaya	Deep
Episode 11 (Saturday, September 29, 2018)	Abhaya	1	Kushal Acharya	"Timro Man"	Santosh Ghale	—	—	—	—
Episode 11 (Saturday, September 29, 2018)	Sanup	2	Bidhya Tiwari	"Timi Binako Jeevan"	Reet Rana Magar	—	—	✔	—
Episode 11 (Saturday, September 29, 2018)	Pramod	3	Surekha Chhetri	"Khutta Tandai Gara"	Swechchhwa Thakuri	✔	—	—	—
Episode 11 (Saturday, September 29, 2018)	Deep	4	Bibek Waiba Lama	"Pinjadako Suga"	Janak Tamraka	—	—	—	—
Episode 12 (Sunday, September 30, 2018)	Sanup	1	Shailu RL Singh	"Relimai Relimai"	Apsara Ghimire	—	—	—	—
Episode 12 (Sunday, September 30, 2018)	Abhaya	2	Anu Sakhya	"NaSodha Malai"	Sanidhya Thapa	—	—	✔	✔
Episode 12 (Sunday, September 30, 2018)	Pramod	3	Suraj Tamang	"Meri Maal Farkaideu"	Rupesh Parajuli	—	—	—	—
Episode 12 (Sunday, September 30, 2018)	Deep	4	Raj Tamang	"K Bhanne Hamro Samaye"	Dipesh Lama	—	—	—	—
Episode 13 (Saturday, October 6, 2018)	Abhaya	1	Ashra Kunwar	"Jeet"	Shrijaya Thapaliya	✔	—	—	—
Episode 13 (Saturday, October 6, 2018)	Deep	2	Annke Shrestha	"Chiso Batas Le"	Sujata Thapa	—	—	—	—
Episode 13 (Saturday, October 6, 2018)	Pramod	3	Sushil Gartaula	"Murchhana"	Sugama Gautam	—	—	—	—
Episode 13 (Saturday, October 6, 2018)	Sanup	4	Sunanda Dhakal	"Yo Katha Ho"	Deepak Sapkota	—	—	—	—
Episode 14 (Sunday, October 7, 2018)	Abhaya	1	Shreya Rai	"Makhamali"	Salina Ramudamu	—	—	—	—
Episode 14 (Sunday, October 7, 2018)	Sanup	2	Saptak Dutraj	"Timi Nai Ho"	Ashish Gubaju	✔	—	—	—
Episode 14 (Sunday, October 7, 2018)	Deep	3	Dinesh Neupane	"Timi Mero Radha Piyari"	Sandip Pariyar	Team Full	—	—	—
Episode 14 (Sunday, October 7, 2018)	Pramond	4	Yogendra Upadhyay	"Aafnai Jindagi Aafai Lai"	CD Vijaya Adhikari	Team Full	—	—	✔
Episode 15 (Saturday, October 13, 2018)	Pramod	1	Tejendra Gandarbha	"Resham Firiri"	Barta Gandarva	Team Full	✔	✔	Team Full
Episode 15 (Saturday, October 13, 2018)	Deep	2	Navraj Sapokota	"Bhanu Ke Ma & Raag Joq"	Rahul Biswas	Team Full	Team Full	✔	Team Full
Episode 15 (Saturday, October 13, 2018)	Sanup	3	Santosh Rana	"Chiso Chiso Hawa ma"	Rajesh Balkoti	Team Full	Team Full	Team Full	Team Full
Episode 15 (Saturday, October 13, 2018)	Abhaya	4	Jyovan Bhuju	"Kalilo Tamalai"	Subash Gandharva	Team Full	Team Full	Team Full	Team Full
Episode 16 (Sunday, October 14, 2018)	Deep	1	Bibek Pariyar	"Maya Baiguni"	Ankit Amaru	Team Full			
Episode 16 (Sunday, October 14, 2018)	Sanup	2	Nishant Dahal	"Jindagi Lai Jeet Haina"	Ankit Babu	Team Full			
Episode 16 (Sunday, October 14, 2018)	Pramod	3	Anish Shrestha	"Timro Man Ko Dalio"	Raju Panta	Team Full			
Episode 16 (Sunday, October 14, 2018)	Abhaya	4	Bibek Lama	"Bhatkiyeka Je Hola-"	Pritesh Rasaili	Team Full			

Coaches teams after Battle Round. (Stolen artists at the bottom).

Season	Team Sanup	Team Pramod	Team Deep	Team Abhaya
1	Santosh Rana, Butwal Saptak Dutraj, Kathmandu; Bidhya Tiwari, Kathmandu Shailu RL Singh, Dhangadhi Nishant Dahal, Jhapa Sunanda Dhakal, Sindhupalchowk Sannidhya Thapa, Siliguri Barta Gandarva, Bhojpur	Sushil Gartaula, Kathmandu; Surekha Chhetri, Guwahati Suraj Tamang, Dharan Yogendra Upadhyay, Jhapa; Tejendra Gandarbha, Bhojpur anish shrestha, Butwal Shrijay Thapaliya, Biratnagar Aashish Gubaju, Kathmandu	Annie Shrestha, Kathmandu Nabaraj Sapkota, Lalitpur; Bivek Pariyar, Birgunj Bibek Waiba Lama, Kathmandu Dinesh Neupane, Lalbandi Raju Tamang, Chandragiri Swechhya Thakuri, Bhairahawa CD Vijaya Adhikari, Pokhara	Anu Shakya, Kathmandu; Ashra Kunwar, Lalitpur Kushal Acharya, Kakarvitta; Shreya Rai, Dhankuta Bibek Lama, Kathmandu Jyovan Bhuju, Kathmandu Reet Rana Magar, Birgunj Rahul Bishwas, Kathmandu

=== Live shows ===
The live shows will begin on 27 October 2018.

==== Results summary ====
Result's colour key
Artist received the fewest votes and was eliminated
Artist was saved by coach
Artist won the public vote
Winner
Runner-up
Artist did not perform that week

Weekly results per artist
Artists	Week 1		Week 2		Week 3		Week 4		Week 5		Week 6		Week 7	Finale
Artists	Round 1	Round 2	Round 1	Round 2	Round 1	Round 2	Round 1	Round 2	Round 1	Round 2	Round 1	Round 2	Week 7	Finale
CD Vijaya Adhikari			Safe					Safe			Safe		Safe	Winner
Kushal Acharya			Safe			Safe						Safe	Safe	Runner-up
Saptak Dutraj	Safe				Safe				Safe				Safe	Runner-up
Shrijay Thapaliya		Safe					Safe				Safe		Safe	Runner-up
Bidhya Tiwari	Safe				Safe							Safe	Eliminated	Eliminated (week 7)
Sushil Gartaula		Safe				Safe				Safe			Eliminated	Eliminated (week 7)
Sherya Rai		Safe				Safe				Safe			Eliminated	Eliminated (week 7)
Bibek Waiba Lama			Safe					Safe		Safe			Eliminated	Eliminated (week 7)
Anu Shakya			Safe									Eliminated	Eliminated (week 6)	
Saileshwori RL Singh				Safe			Safe					Eliminated	Eliminated (week 6)	
Raju Tamang											Eliminated	Eliminated (week 6)		
Surekha Chettri											Eliminated	Eliminated (week 6)		
Bibek Lama										Eliminated	Eliminated (week 5)			
Swekshya Thakuri										Eliminated	Eliminated (week 5)			
Ashish Gubaju			Safe						Eliminated	Eliminated (week 5)				
Santosh Rana									Eliminated	Eliminated (week 5)				
Ashra Kunwar			Safe					Eliminated	Eliminated (week 4)					
Annie Shrestha			Safe					Eliminated	Eliminated (week 4)					
Suraj Tamang							Eliminated	Eliminated (week 4)						
Sannidhya Thapa				Safe			Eliminated	Eliminated (week 4)						
Tejendra Gandarva		Safe				Eliminated	Eliminated (week 3)							
Reet Rana Magar		Safe				Eliminated	Eliminated (week 3)							
Barta Gandharva	Safe				Eliminated	Eliminated (week 3)								
Bibek Pariyar	Safe				Eliminated	Eliminated (week 3)								
Yogendra Upadhaya				Eliminated	Eliminated (week 2)									
Nishant Dahal				Eliminated	Eliminated (week 2)									
Nabaraj Sapkota			Eliminated	Eliminated (week 2)										
Jyovan Bhuju			Eliminated	Eliminated (week 2)										
Anish Shrestha		Eliminated	Eliminated (week 1)											
Rahul Bishwas		Eliminated	Eliminated (week 1)											
Sunanda Dhakal	Eliminated	Eliminated (week 1)												
Dinesh Neupane	Eliminated	Eliminated (week 1)												

==== Week 1: (27–28 October) ====
This episode aired from 8:30 pm to 10:30pm.

Order	Coach	Artist	Song	Result
1	Sanup	Saptak Dutraj	"Maryo Ni Maryo Ni"	Advanced
2	Deep	Swekshya Thakuri	"Timi Royeko Pal"	Advanced
3	Sanup	Sunanda Dhakal	"Luki Chippi"	Eliminated
4	Sanup	Barta Gandarva	"Timile Ta Haina Timra Bhaka Harule"	Advanced
5	Sanup	Bidhya Tiwari	"Taha Chaina	Coach's Choice
6	Deep	Bibek Pariyar	"Tada Bhaigayu Feri"	Coach's Choice
7	Deep	Dinesh Neupane	"Siranma Photo Chha"	Eliminated
8	Deep	Raju Tamang	"Kaile Kai Man Ka Kura"	Advanced

Order	Coach	Artist	Song	Result
1	Abhaya	Rahul Bishwas	"Jhilke"	Eliminated
2	Pramod	Anish Shrestha	"Tunguna Ko Dhun Ma"	Eliminated
3	Abhaya	Reet Rana Magar	"Lekali"	Advanced
4	Pramod	Sushil Gartaula	"Yeti Samma"	Coach's Choice
5	Abhaya	Sherya Rai	"Nashalu Timro Herai Le"	Coach's Choice
6	Pramod	Shrijaya Thapaliya	"Ladai"	Advanced
7	Abhaya	Bibek Lama	"Maya Ko Dori Le"	Advanced
8	Pramod	Tejendra Gandarva	"Ghatana"	Advanced

==== Week 2: (3–4 November) ====
Order	Coach	Artist	Song	Result
1	Deep	Annie Shrestha	"Sapana Bhai"	Coach's Choice
2	Abhaya	Jyovan Bhuju	"Resham"	Eliminated
3	Deep	Nabaraj Sapkota	"Raag Bhimpalasi	Eliminated
4	Abhaya	Anu Shakya	"Diula Yo Jaban"	Coach's Choice
5	Deep	Bibek Waiba Lama	"Komal Tyo Timro"	Advanced
6	Abhaya	Kushal Acharya	"Sanjha Ko Bela"	Advanced
7	Deep	CD Vijaya Adhikari	"Jhirma Uninu Tyo Eauta Kura"	Advanced
8	Abhaya	Ashra Kunwar	"Adhuro Prem"	Advanced

Order	Coach	Artist	Song	Result
1	Sanup	Santosh Rana	"Budheskal Ko Lathi"	Advanced
2	Pramod	Yogendra Upadhaya	"Chumera Pana Bhari"	Eliminated
3	Sanup	Sannidhya Thapa	"Har Raat Sapani Ma"	Coach's Choice
4	Pramod	Ashish Gubaju	"Sangai"	Coach's Choice
5	Sanup	Nishant Dahal	"Aankha Bhan Ka Sapana"	Eliminated
6	Pramod	Surekha Chhetri	"Sawane Jhari Ma"	Advanced
7	Sanup	Shailu RL Singh	"Kaha Kaha Dukchha Priye"	Advanced
8	Pramod	Suraj Tamang	"Halla Chalechha"	Advanced

==== Week 3: (10–11 November) ====
Order	Coach	Artist	Song	Result
1	Deep	Swechhya Thakuri	"Kasari Bhanu Ma"	Advanced
2	Sanup	Saptak Dutraj	"Himali Nepali"	Advanced
3	Deep	Raju Tamang	"Timi Jun Rahar le"	Coach's Choice
4	Sanup	Barta Gandarva	"Bala Joban Khelera Gayo"	Eliminated
5	Deep	Bibek Pariyar	"Maya Ke Hola"	Eliminated
6	Sanup	Bidhya Tiwari	"Samjhana Aie Dincha"	Coach's Choice

Order	Coach	Artist	Song	Result
1	Pramod	Surekha Chhetri	"Aja Bara Hate Patuki"	Advanced
2	Abhaya	Reet Rana Magar	"Patuki ma"	Eliminated
3	Pramod	Tejendra Gandharva	"Kaile Maya Gham jastai"	Eliminated
4	Abhaya	Shreya Rai	"Dhankuta ko dada" "Kanchhi nani"	Advanced
5	Pramod	Sushil Gartaula	"Mero Pau ma aja"	Coach's Choice
6	Abhaya	Kushal Acharya	"Ram Sailee & Syndicate (Mashup)"	Coach's Choice

==== Week 4: (17–18 November) ====
Order	Coach	Artist	Song	Result
1	Pramod	Ashish Gabaju	"Maan Magan"	Coach's Choice
2	Sanup	Sannidhya Thapa	"Bujhai deu"	Eliminated
3	Pramod	Shrijay Thapaliya	"She is The Bomb"	Advanced
4	Sanup	Santosh Rana	"Kasai Lai Paani Ma"	Coach's Choice
5	Pramod	Suraj Tamang	"Ukali Orati Haru Ma"	Eliminated
6	Sanup	Shailu RL Singh	"Laija chari"	Advanced

Order	Coach	Artist	Song	Result
1	Deep	Bibek Waiba Lama	"Chyangaba" and "Bloody Revolution"	Coach's Choice
2	Abhaya	Anu Shakya	"Ma Sansar Jitne"	Advanced
3	Deep	CD Vijaya Adhikari	"Damphu Bazar Ma"	Advanced
4	Abhaya	Ashra Kunwar	"Prakriti"	Eliminated
5	Deep	Annie Shrestha	"Jhajhalko Liyera"	Eliminated
6	Abhaya	Bibek Lama	"Sambhodhan"	Coach's Choice

==== Week 5: (24–25 November) ====
Order	Coach	Artist	Song	Result
1	Sanup	Santosh Rana	"Jaula Railaima"	Eliminated
2	Sanup	Saptak Dutraj	"Sadhai Sadhai"	Advanced
3	Pramod	Sushil Gartaula	"Badal Banaideu"	Advanced
4	Pramod	Ashish Gubaju	"Chari Bharara"	Eliminated

Order	Coach	Artist	Song	Result
1	Deep	Swecha Thakuri	"Danfe Jhai Nachne"	Eliminated
2	Deep	Bibek Waiba Lama	"Farki Farki Nahera Malai"	Advanced
3	Abhaya	Shreya Rai	"Kasari Bhanu"	Advanced
4	Abhaya	Bibek Lama	"Kehi mitho baata gara"	Eliminated

==== Week 6: (1–2 December) ====
Order	Coach	Artist	Song	Result
1	Deep	CD Vijaya Adhikari	"Maili"	Advanced
2	Deep	Raju Tamang	"Are Kyanam"	Eliminated
3	Pramod	Surekha Chettri	"TirKha Lagyo Paani Khaye"	Eliminated
4	Pramod	Srijay Thapalia	"Hidne Manchhe Ladchha"	Advanced

Order	Coach	Artist	Song	Result
1	Sanup	Saileshwori RL Singh	"Dubana Deu Malai"	Eliminated
2	Sanup	Bidhya Tiwari	"Ma Chahi Nepali"	Advanced
3	Abhaya	Kushal Acharya	"Purbai Ramailo"	Advanced
4	Abhaya	Anu Shakya	"Timro Laagi"	Eliminated

=== Semi finals ===
==== Week 7: (8–9 December) ====
Order	Coach	Artist	Song	Result
1	Deep	Bibek Waiba Lama	"Hamro Nepal Ma"	Eliminated
2	Abhaya	Shreya Rai	"Maiti Ghar"	Eliminated
3	Sanup	Bidhya Tiwari	"Pitch Road"	Eliminated
4	Pramod	Sushil Gartaula	"Aljhechha Kyare Pachhyauri"	Eliminated
5	Deep	CD Vijaya Adhikari	"Pilayo Sathile"	Advanced
6	Abhaya	Kushal Acharya	"Sanjha Ko Bela"	Advanced
7	Sanup	Saptak Dutraj	"Himali Nepali"	Advanced
8	Pramod	Srijay Thapalia	"Adhuro Prem"	Advanced

=== Finale ===
Order	Coach	Artist	Song	Result
1	Abhaya	Kushal Acharya	"Mercedes Benz"	runner up
2	Sanup	Saptak Dutraj	"Galti Mero Chaina"	3rd place
3	Pramod	Srijay Thapalia	"Bir Bir Bir Gorkhali"	4th place
4	Deep	CD Vijaya Adhikari	"Oye Jhuma Jhumkawali"	Winner
