= Padam Rokaya =

Padam Rokaya पदम रोकाया
- Born: January 30, 1990 (age 35); Jumla Nepal
- Origin: Nepal
- Genres: Nepali Modern Songs/FOlk Songs/Pop Song and more..
- Occupation(s): Lyrist, musician, Music Director
- Years active: 2005AD - Present
- Member of: Rara Music Award

Padam Rokaya (Nepali: पदम रोकाया; born 30 January 1990) is a Nepalese musician and lyricist. He began his career in 2005 with the debut song "Jumla Kalikot" and has since released over 200 songs. Some of his popular works include "Narau Meri Aama," "Manma Pir Chha," and "Karnali." Rokaya has been recognized with the Jibanta Nepal Music Award for his contributions to Nepalese music.

== Awards ==
SN	Award Title	Award Category	Award From	Result	Reference
1	2nd Jibanta Nepal music Award - 2023	Best Music Composer	Mero Dilko Raja -Songs	won	
2	National Power News Award - 2018	Best Modern Pop Song	Timi Dekhi Tadha - Songs	won	
3	Government of Nepal (National Talent Award - provincial based) - 2019	Best Singer / Music Composer			

== Songs ==
Release date	Song name	Singer	Genre	Reference
2018	Timi Dekhi Tadha	Melina Rai	Modern	
2016	Timile Ghrina Garepani	Pramod Kharel	Modern	
2020	Risayera Gayapani	Anju Panta	Modern	
2015	Yo Junima	D B Thapa	Modern	
2017	Jindagima Timi Thiyau	Promod Kharel	Modern	
2017	Mutu Bhitra	Promod Kharel	Modern	
2013	Maya Garne Jiwan Sathi	Smriti Shahi	Modern	
2019	Mero Dilko Raja	Melina Rai / Balkrishna Budha	Modern	
2014	Dhoka Dine DhokeBaaj	Anju Panta	Modern	
2014	Chhokho Maya	Manju Upasana	Modern	
2009	Jumla Kalikot	Padam Rokaya / Devi Gharti	Folk	
2012	Karnali Durdasa	Padam Roakaya	Folk	
2018	Narou Meri Aama	Badri Pangeni	Folk	
2018	Manma Pir Chha	Ramji Khan / Nabina Wagle	Folk	
2018	Karnali	Padam Rokaya / Purnakala BC	Folk	
2017	Beauty palar	Radhika Hamal / Birkha BK	Folk	
2016	Kalejiko Ghau	Purnakala BC / Arjun Khatri	Folk	
2012	Dhoka Khako chhu	Padam Rokaya / Tika Pun	Folk	
2012	Njau Bhagi Bhagi	Padam rokaya / Radhika Hamal	Folk	
2021	Thukka timro Baani	Pushpa Bohara	Folk	

== Honor ==
SN	Date	Title	Ref
1	2019	Kanaka Sundari Rural Municipality (Karnali Province Label)	
2	2017	6th Music Khabar Music Award 2017	
3	2022	Ranmechhap Cultural Artist Society	
4	2022	Music Rolilty Collection Society of Nepal	

== Organization involvement ==
SN	Organization Name	Designation	Ref
1	Nepal kala Saskritik Parthistan	President	
2	Karnali Kalakar Samaj	President	
3	Rara National Music Award	Chairmen	
4	Cultural Society of Nepal	Advisory	
