= David Shankar =

Nepalese Singer

David Shankar डेबिट शंकर
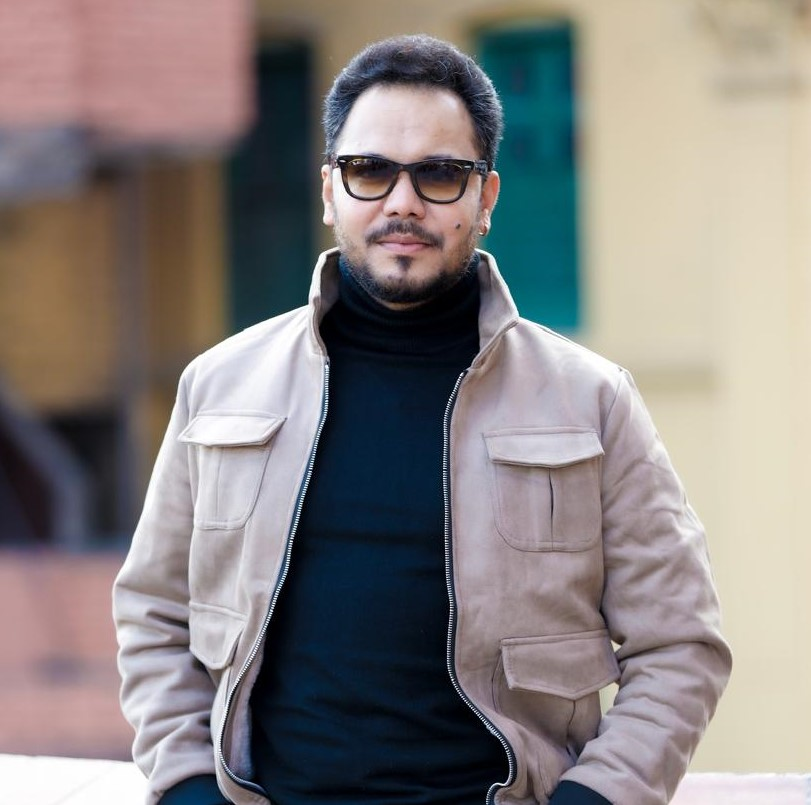

Background information
- Born: July 25; Panchthar
- Origin: Nepal
- Genres: Nepali modern songs, Folk songs, Pop Songs, Playback Singer
- Occupation: Singer
- Instruments: Guitar, harmonium, madal,
- Years active: 2000 –present
- Member of: Performers Society of Nepal, Music Association of Nepal, National Creator and Performer Academy, Music Royalty collection Society Nepal, Music Composer Association Nepal

David Shankar (Nepali: डेबिट शंकर; born 25 July) also spelled as Debit Shankar is a Nepalese playback singer. He started his musical career with his first song "Kalle Bhanyo Timi Lai Ma Mayagardina Re" and has since released more than 150 songs including "Pahilo Number ma", "darsan salam", and "Ghin Ghin Madal" Shankar has been involved with film soundtracks including Chakka Panja and The Dark Light. He has won Sagarmatha Music awards and Dcine awards. He was a winner of Mechi Tara and Panchthar Tara Singing Reality show.

Panchthar born Shankar began his formal career in music after winning the Panchthar Idol title in 2062 B.S. (circa 2005 A.D.), followed by the Mechi Tara crown in 2064 B.S. His first album, My Dreams, was released in 2068 B.S. Later, in 2081 B.S., he was involved as a judge on the Nepali singing reality television show Junior Singing Star, in Season 1.

== Discography ==
=== Film discography ===
SN	Songs Name	Movie name	Credit	ref
1	Darsan Salam	Chhaka Panja-4	Singer	
2	Pahilo Number Ma	chakka Panja-3	Singer	
3	Ghin Ghin Madal	Panche Baja	Singer	
4	Radha Kisan	The Dark and Light	Singer	
5	Mitho Mitho Bolchal	Chalechha Batas sustari	Singer	
6	Mero ta Bhagya	Man sanga Man	Singer	
7	Timi Ruda(Kaha Rakhna Sake)	Love station	Singer	
8	Litar Ka Litar	Gore	Singer	
9	Ubina ko ma	Bich Bato	Singer	
10	Yo Man ka kura	Brindaban	Singer	
11	Ma Jharana Timi Jhankar		Singer	
12	Mero Sundar sapana	Agni	Singer	
13	Danka Pityo	Mr Nepali	Singer	
14	Green Cardaima	Pheri Resam Philili	Singer	
15	Man Sanga Man	Mero Ta Bhagya	Singer	

=== General songs ===
SN	Song name	Song Type	Singer	ref
1	Ma Timro Yaadma	Modern Song	David Shankar	
2	Sala La Bageko Paani	Folk Modern Song	David Shankar/Sahima Shrestha	
3	Salleriko Ban	Folk Song	David Shankar/ Melina Rai	
4	Boldaina Photo	Folk Song	David Shankar/Bhabana Acharya	
5	Huncha Bhanana	Folk Song	David Shankar/Pooja Sunuwar	
6	Sadhai Yestai Mitha Kura	Modern Song	David Shankar/Benisha Poudel	
7	Sandarbha	Modern Song	David Shankar	
8	Afnai Ghar Agan ma	Teej Song	David Shankar/Bhawana Acharya	
9	Aaja Aafnai Zindagi	Modern Song	David Shankar	
10	Aafno Manchhe Aafnai Huncha	Modern Song	David Shankar	
11	Thaha Chhaina Zindagi Ma	Modern Song	David Shankar	
12	Timile Suneu ra k	Modern Pop	David Shankar	
13	Batas Bani aayau	Modern Song	David Shankar	
14	Chham cham Paujuko Talaima	Lok Modern Song	David Shankar	
15	Pirati Ko Gundri	Lok Pop Song	David Shankar/Bini Shestha	
16	Basa Maya	Modern Song	David Shankar/Melina Rai	
17	Kebal Timilai Rojeko	Pop Song	David Shankar	
18	Hey Maya Timilai	Lok Pop Song	David Shankar/Benisha Poudel	
19	Icom Bcom	Pop Song	David Shankar	
20	Nakhara	Modern Song	David Shankar	
21	Chautari Ma	Lok Modern Song	David Shankar/Samikshya Adhikari	
22	Man ko Mailo	Modern Song	David Shankar	
23	Timi Lai Herera	Modern Song	David Shankar	
24	Mero Muskan	Modern Song	David Shankar/Asmita Adhikari	
25	Kasmire Gamchha	Folk Modern Song	David Shankar/ Sharmila Bardewa	
26	Bhet Bhaya Chhutna Garo	Modern Song	David Shankar	
27	Dur Dekhi Aya	Modern Song	David Shankar	
28	A Chelibeti	Folk Song	David Shankar	
29	Hajur Nai Ho	Modern Song	David Shankar / Annu Chaudhari	

== Awards ==
SN	Awards Title	Awards Category	Song name	result	ref
1	Sagarmatha Music Awards-2076(BS)	Best Playback Singer	Pahilo number Ma	winner	
2	Music Khabar Music Awards-2076(BS)	Best Playback Singer	Pahilo Number Ma	winner	
3	Second Himalayan International Award-2022(AD)	Modern Pop Song	Boldaina Photo	winner	
4	8th music khabar music Award	Best Pop Singer	i.com b.com	Nominated	
5	Nateshwari Music Award-2075(BS)	Popular Award	Ma Timro Yadma	Winner	
6	Sagarmatha Music Award-2075(BS)	Best Playback Singer	Ghin Ghin Madal	winner	
7	Dcine Music Award-2076(BS)	Best Playback Singer-Male	Pailo Number Ma	winner	
8	Kaika FM Music Award-2076(BS)	Best Song of the year SInger-Male	Pailo Number Ma	winner	
9	National Box office Film Fare Award-2020	Best Playback Singer-Male	Pailo Number Ma	winner	
10	National Boxoffice Music Video Award-2018	Best Playback Singer -Male	Ghin Ghin Madal	winner	
11	Global Motion Picture Award-2019	Best Playback Singer -Male	Pailo Number	winner	
12	Star International Award 2019-Quatar	Best Playback Singer -Male	Pailo Number MA	winner	
13	Sundaradevi Sandesh Music Award-2075(BS)	Best Singer Pop	i.com b.com	winner	
14	7th National Rapti Music Award-2075(BS)		pahilo number maa	winner	
15	3rd Quality Entertainment Award – 2080(BS)	Juri Award		winner	
16	4th Genius Music Award – 2079(BS)	Best Public Choice Award	Darshan Salam	winner	
18	2nd Jeevanta Nepal Music Award 2080	Best Playback Singer	Darsan Salam	winner	
19	4th Rastrya Sadhana Music Reward −2080(BS)	Best modern Pop (Male) Singer	Nakhara	Winner	
20	Rara National Music Award – 2080(BS)	Best Modern Pop (male) Singer	Sadhai Yastai Mitha Kura	Winner	
21	7th NIM Award	Best Modern Pop Singer	Timilai Herera	winner	
22	Epic Nepal Musci Award – 2025	Best Playback Singer	Darshan Salam	Winner	

== Honor ==
SN	Honor Title	Date	Ref
1	Natikaji National Distinguished Music Honors and Awards	12 February 2025	
2	Nepal Music & Fashion Award	June 2025	

== Organization Involvement ==
SN	Organization Name	Duretion (AD)	Ref
1	National Creator & Profermer Academy (NCPA) - Board Member	(2025–Present)	
2	Performers Society of Nepal - Founder Member	Sence From 2013	
3	Music Association of Nepal - General Member	Sence From 2014	
4	Music Royalty Collection Society Nepal(MRCSN) - General Member	(2023–present)	
5	Music Composer Association Nepal	(2023–Present	
