= Suman Bairagi =

Nepalese songwriter and lyricist

Suman Bairagi सुमन बैरागी
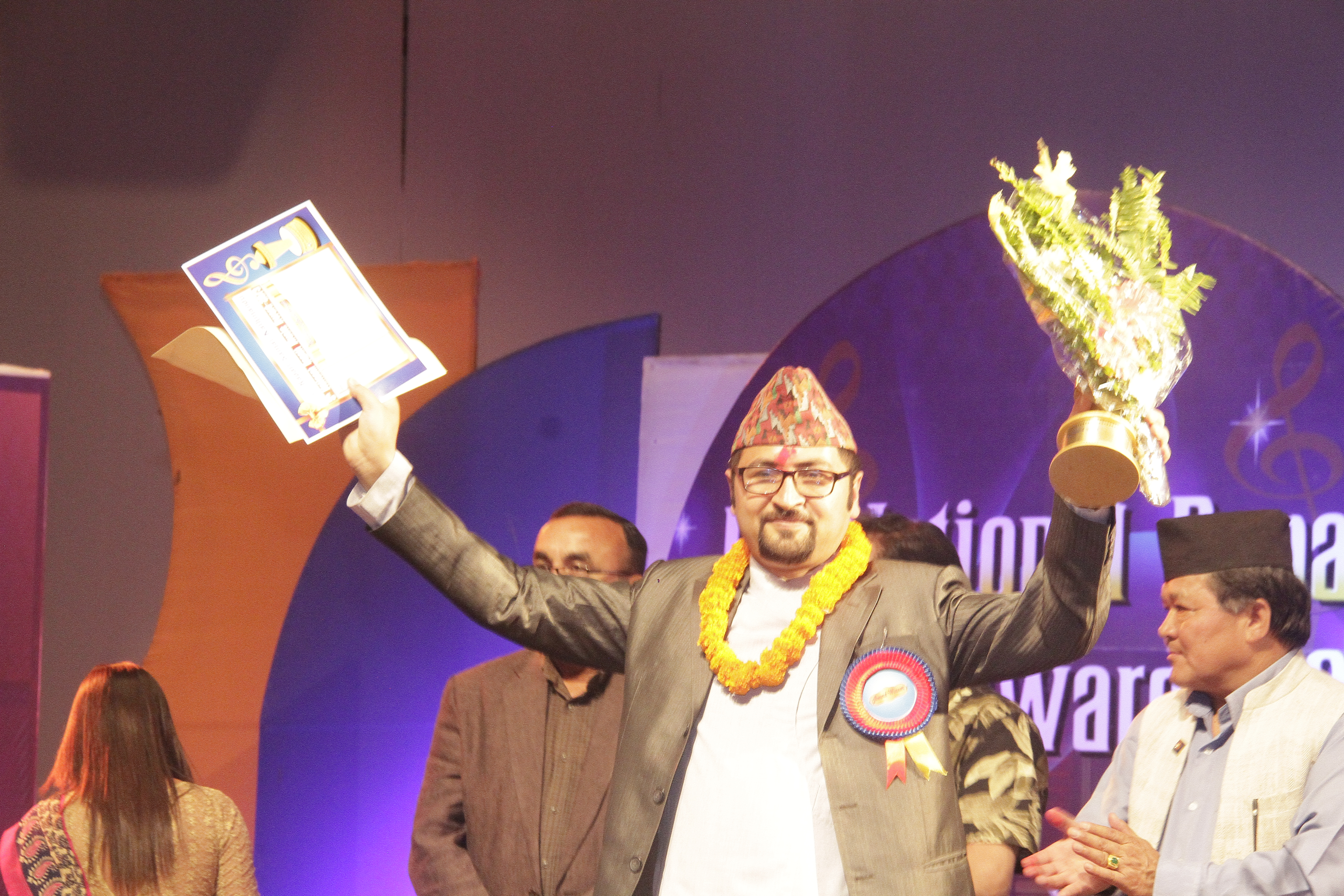

Background information
- Born: 1982-05-03; Harmi-9, Thaniswara, Gorkha
- Origin: Nepal
- Genres: Folk, Modern, Filmy, Pop
- Occupation: lyricist/songwriter
- Years active: 2002-present
- Website

Tanka Bahadur Pandit (Nepali: सुमन बैरागी; born 1982), also known as Suman Bairagi or Suman Pandit Bairagi, is a lyricist, songwriter, journalist and program presenter from Nepal. He became invovled in music in 2002, and since that year, he has worked on hundreds of songs. His first song was "Ashu ko talau", and his first song collection was "Sathi". Popular songs from Bairagi include "Najalaaideu mitu, timile sadhai pida diyau".

He has been awarded National Capital Awards and Box Office Music Awards, including for his song "Kahi bhetiyana dhan phalne rukh", which also won the National Song of the Year Awards.

== Songs ==
Song name	Voice artist	Year
Najalaaideu mutu	Promod Kharel	2012
Baigunilai Samjhi	Dinesh Dahal Chhetri	2013
Timle Sadhai Pida	Durga Kharel	2013
Timle Sadhai Pida	Shishir Yogi	2013
Afno Bhagya	Sanjaya Fraunfelder	2016
Nepal Bhayara	Yuvaraj Chaulagain	2017
Bhandai Holan	Kanhaiya Singha Pariyar	2018
Nepal Paryo Lagchha	Ranjita thapa and Dipsagar Thapa	2018
Prabasako Pida	Rajan Thakuri	2018
Salala Bageko Pani	Devid Shankar & Sahima Shrestha	2018
Rifalko Sirani	Druba Bisco & Sahima Shreshta	2018
Kasto Bhagya	Bindu Pariyar	2018
Rudai Rudai Gayau	Mira Giri	2019
Hamro Dharti	Lab Kumar Bhatta	2020
Gaalaiko Kothima	Ruchi ghimire	2021
Man ko tarale	Lab kumar bhatta	2021

== Awards ==
SN	Award name	Song name	Result
1	Rapati Music Award 2073	Best Lyricist (Nepal Bhayara Nai -National Feelings Songs)	Winner
2	2nd National Capital Award 2073	Best Entertainment Journalist	Winner
3	Sundaradevi Music Journalism Award 2073	Best Entertainment Journalist	Winner
4	Bindabasini Music Journalism Award 2073	Best Entertainment Journalist (Bindabasini Music)	Winner
5	Folk Music Journalism Award 2073	Best Entertainment Journalist (National Folk & Duet Song Academy of Nepal)	Winner
6	Amar Bhawana National Lyricist Award 2074	Best Entertainment Journalist (Song of Prabasako Pida with Rs.51 thousand)	Winner
7	National Musical Youth Arts Journalism Award 2074	Best Entertainment Journalist (Music Association of Nepal)	Winner
8	Folk Music Journalism Award 2074	Best Entertainment Journalist (National Folk & Duet Song Academy of Nepal)	Winner
9	4th National Capital Award 2075	Best Song of the Year (song of Prabasako Pida-Modern song)	Winner
10	Box Office Music Award 2075	Best Lyricist (song of Prabasako Pida-Modern song)	Winner
11	Peace Nepal Industrial Music Award 2076	Best Music Video Director (song of Binti Chha Malai-Modern song)	Winner
12	Nepal Music & Fashion Award 2077	Best pop Lyricist (song of Galaiko Kothi-Pop song)	Winner

== Honors ==
SN	Honor Name	Organizer	Date
1	Golden Jubilee Lyricist Honor Award	Shree Mahendra Leela Higher Secondary School, Harmi Gorkha	2069
2	Folk Music Journalism Honor Award	National Folk & Duet Song Academy Nepal Central Committee	2073
3	Folk Music Journalism Honor Award	National Folk & Duet Song Academy Nepal Valley Coordination Committee	2074
4	Jyoti Films & Music Journalism Honor	Jyoti Films & Music	2078
5	Sagarmatha Music Journalism Honor Award	Sagarmatha Music Award	2078
6	Filmykhabar Sabin Shakya Memorial Arts Journalism Honor Award	Filmy Khabar Weekly	2078
7	6th Captivating Creation Journalism Honor	Captivating Creation India	2023
8	Mandala National Talent Award	Mandala Entertainment	2080
9	Anuradha Films Special Personalities Honor	Anuradha Films Entertainment	2080
10	Dakshya International Special Honor	Dakhsya International	2023
11	National Music Art Journalism Honor	Association of Music Industries Nepal	2079
12	Sagarmatha Art Journalism prize	Artha Nepal Pvt.Ltd.	2078

== Jury ==
SN	Event name	Organizer	Date
1	Apic Nepal Music Award	Apic Nepal	2075
2	National Sadhana Music Award	Samana Music Creation	2076
3	AMS National Music Honor & Award	AMS Music & Entertainment Pvt.Ltd.	2079
4	Miss & Mrs Glitter's International Queen 2020 (Nepal Judge)	Nirbhaya Arjuna and Glitter International	2020

== Organization portfolio ==
SN	Organization	Designation	Time
1	Bihani Cultural Group	Founder Member	2060
2	International Migrant Alliance	Founder Member	2008
3	Sayapatri Youth Club Gorkha	Advisor	2059
4	Gorkha Cultural Society	Founder Senior Vice President	2072 to 2077
5	Gorkha Cultural Society	Chairman	2077-12-24-2080-02-22
6	Arts Music Journalist Association of Nepal	Founder Chairman	2072 to until
7	Sayapatri Nepali Cultural Group of Nepal	Founder General Secretary	2072 to until
8	Music Association of Nepal	General Secretary	2078 to until
9	Music Royalty Collection Society of Nepal	Exucative Board Member	2073 to 2078
10	Gorkha Samaj Sewa Kendra Kathmandu	Lifetime Member	2073
11	Lyricist Association of Nepal	Member	2069
