= Machapuchare (disambiguation) =

Machapuchare may refer to:

- Machapuchare, a mountain situated in Gandaki Province
- Machhapuchchhre Rural Municipality, Gaunpalika in Gandaki
- Machhapuchchhre Bank, a bank in Nepal
