= Rara National Awards =

Nepalese film award ceremony

- Country: Nepal
- Presented by: Karnali Kalakar Samajand Kanaka Sundari Films Pvt. Ltd

The Rara National Awards is an annual ceremony honoring achievements in the Nepali Movie and Music Industry. Organized by Karnali Kalakar Samaj and Kanaka Sundari Films Pvt. Ltd., it was established in 2074 B.S. according to the Nepali Calendar. The inaugural award ceremony took place in Kathmandu, Nepal. Former President of Nepal, Bidhya Devi Bhandari, once served as its chief guest.

== Awards category ==
The Rara Award presents awards in the following categories:

- Nepali National Song
- Best Song
- Best Musicians
- Best Singer Male
- Best Singer Female
- Best Model Male
- Best Model Female
- Best Singer Male
- Best Singer Female
- Best Director
- Best Video Editor

== Awards summary ==
=== First Rara Awards ===
The Rara National Awards completed their first awards program in January 2023, corresponding to the Nepali calendar year 2079 (BS - Nepali Calendar). The following artists were honored:

SN	Artist Name	Awards Category	Song/Movie	Result
1	Yam Parsad Niure	Best National Song	Janta sachet Banau	won
2	Parmod Kharel	Besl Modern Singer - Male	Kina Marina Ma	won
3	Narmata Sapkota	Best Model Modern Song -Female	Kali	won
4	Suprime Malla Thakuri	Best Child Singer	Phapad Ko Pitho	won
5	Michu Dhimal	Best Modern Song -Female	Udhunu chha	won
6	Tika Pun	Best Folk Song - Female	Bhagemai chhau bhane	won
7	Sarad Raj Mainali	Best Lyricist -Male	Keko Badlama	won
8	Ek Narayan Bhandari	Best Folk Music Composer	Timur	won
9	Bimal Adhikari	Best Folk Dohari Model - Male	Doharmai Pareko Chhu - Music Video	won
10	Prakash Kutwal	Best Folk Singer - Male	Suntali	Won
11	Mahesh Kumar Aauji	Best Cultural Singer - Male	Chhalia Song	won
12	Bhanubhakta Jaisi	Best Cultural Lyricist	Meri Maya SItalu Chhaya	won
13	Shree Krishna Bam Malla	Best Modern Song	Dadhaghare Saili	won
14	Roshan Sing	Best Music Composer	Kina Marina Ma	won
15	Manoj Dongol	Best Audio Mixing	Pau Hajurko	won

=== Second Rara Award ===
The Rara National Awards completed their first awards program in 2024, corresponding to the Nepali calendar year 2080 (BS - Nepali Calendar). The following artists were honored

SN	Artist Name	Award Category	Song/Move	Result
1	Saubhu Kumat	Best Modern Song- Male	Maili -Song	won
2	Padma Linkha Magar	Best Lyricist	Ammali po Bhaya - Song	won
3	Ram Kumar Rimal	Best Musician	Pura Bhayo Sapana - Song	won
4	David Shankar	Best Modern Singer - Male	Sadhai Yestai Mitha Kura - Song	won
5	Nima Sherpa	Best Modern New Singer	Bhana Aaja - Song	won
6	Nita Achaeya	Best Modern Singer - Female	Manko Ghau - Song	won
7	Barsha Siwakoti	Best Model - Female	Pani dar - Music Video	won
8	Pabi Shaki	Best New Model - Female	Jumla - Music Video	won
9	DB Khadka	Best (Modern Song )Music Director	Sadhai Yestai Mitha Kura	won
10	Sagar Lamsal (Bale)	Best Model - Male	Banai jyu Dajai Jyu	won
11	Anshu Barma	Best New Model - Male	Sun Chadi - 2	won
13	Purnakala BC	Best Folk Singer - Female	Maili - song	won
14	Kumar Karki	Best Folk Singer - Male	Manko Chahana	won
15	Dr. Shiba Subedi	Best Folk Music - Male	Dukha Tarya chaina	won
