= CD Vijaya Adhikari =

Nepalese singer

CD Vijaya Adhikari सि.डि. विजय अधिकारी
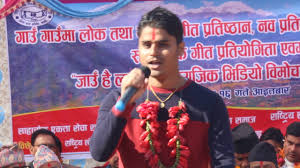
- Adhikari singing in a program in Lahachok, Jan 2017

Background information
- Born: 20 August 1991 (age 35); Lahachok, Pokhara, Nepal
- Genres: Classical, semi-classical, ghazals, playback
- Occupations: Singer, Composer
- Instrument: Vocals Harmonium
- Years active: 2010–present

CD Vijaya Adhikari (Nepali: सि.डि. विजय अधिकारी; born 20 August 1991) is a Nepali singer and composer. He was the winner of The Voice of Nepal season 1. He also participated in an environmental song titled "Melancholy", sung by 365 Nepali Artists, which set a Guinness World Record for "Most Vocal Solos in a Song Recording".

== Personal life ==
CD Vijaya Adhikari was born on 20 August 1991 as a son of Chandra Kanta Adhikari and Durga Devi Adhikari, in Machhapuchchhre-4, Lahachok, near Pokhara.

He is married to Manisha Rai, a well known music artist who also sang on "Melancholy".

== Career ==
Adhikari has contributed vocals to more than 200 songs, including romantic, rock, sad, ghazal and patriotic songs. Some of his hit songs are "Doori Majboori", "Man Magyau Man Diye", "Nasha Piune Bani Bhayo", "Malai Ta Birsinchau Hola Timile", "Dhan Lai Maya Gariraichhau", "Mero Lash Ko Malami", "Natak Raichha Timro Maya", "Khusi Matra", "Jhanakuti Jhai Jhai (Doli)".

His first film song as a playback singer was for Doli (2018).

In December 2018, he became well known when he won the first season of the reality show The Voice of Nepal.

== Songs ==
Some of Adhikari's most well-known songs are listed below.

Year	Song	Writers	Co-singer(s)	Composer(s)
2020	"Bhulbhulaiya"	Arun Kafley		CD Vijaya Adhikari
2021	"Oileejharne Phool | Dhoka Dine"	Gauri Kafle	Samiksha Adhikari	CD Vijaya Adhikari
2021	"Doori Majboori"	CD Vijay Adhikari	Prabisha Adhikari	CD Vijaya Adhikari & Anmxus Music
2022	"Abiral Mayako Koseli"	Poonam Mothey		CD Vijaya Adhikari
2025	K Timi Malai Maya Garchau	Rakesh Shah	Indrakala Rai	CD Vijaya Adhikari

== Awards and achievements ==
- 2019 World Nepali Music Award, New York, Best Modern Song Male for the song Afnai Geet
- 2019 National Sadhana Music Award, The Best Singer for the song Suseldai Timile
- 2018 The Voice of Nepal Winner
- 2018 Radio Nepal All Nepal Aadhunik Song Competition Winner
- 2012 Khoji Prativako – 2, First runner up
- 2010 Annapurna Award for the Most Promising Pokhreli Artist of the Year for the song Hansu Bhanda Pani
- 2010 Prithvi Narayan Campus (PNC) Idol, Pokhara, Winner
- 2010 Big Icon, Pokhara, First runner up
- 2007 Gandaki Tara, Pokhara, Second runner up
- 2004 Matribhumi Tara, Pokhara, Winner
- 2003 Dhuk Dhuki Award for the Child Artist of the Year for the song Ustai Aankha Ustai Bhaka (Aabhas)

== See also ==
- The Voice of Nepal
- "Melancholy" (song)

Awards and achievements
Preceded by N/A	The Voice of Nepal; Winner; 2018	Succeeded by Ram Limbu
