= Milan Amatya =

Milan Newar मिलन
- Born: January 25, 1986 (age 40); Nonaikhuti, Garuajhar, BTR, Assam, India
- Occupations: Playback singer, performer
- Labels: Music Nepal, OSR Digital, Highlights Nepal

Milan Amatya (मिलन अमात्य) is a Nepalese playback singer. She has been singing since childhood and is able to sing in multiple languages, including Nepali, Hindi, and Assamese. She is currently located in the UK for a music program. In 2014, after six years marriage, she divorced her husband Mason Amatya as he was not supportive of her career. In 2016, Amatya lost over 13 kg and debuted her new figure in a music video which was widely praised by Nepali media outlets. She has written and produced songs for movies and DVDs. Many of her songs have featured her personal pain and family life.

Milan has also participated in a notable Nepali environmental awareness song named Melancholy, which featured 365 Nepali singers and musicians. She recorded her solo parts on 19 May 2016 at Radio Nepal studio in Kathmandu. She set the Guinness World Records for "Most Vocal Solos in a Song Recording.", The song was written, composed and directed by environmentalist Nipesh DHAKA.

Milan Newar is a coach on The Voice of Nepal reality show and won the title of the winning coach of The Voice of Nepal season 5.

== Albums ==
- Assamese: Khunmani (Bihu songs), Akou Anupama, Kunwali, Rangdhali, Gamusa
- Bodo: Rojeni Arnai, Fri Fri okha
- Nepali: Kanchi, Mero Mann, Maya, Asha, Tirsana, Baduli, Maya ko Indreni
- Rajasthani folk: Ghoomar, Ruma Jhuma, Chudidar Gajaro, Devar Mharo Re
- Rajasthani bhajan: Lagan Shyam Sang Lagi, Parchio Babero, Ghume Ghodaliyo Babero

== Awards ==
- Image Awards 2012 (Best Pop Singer Female)
