= Kiran Gajmer =

American singer and music composer of Nepalese origin

Kiran Gajmer किरण गजमेर
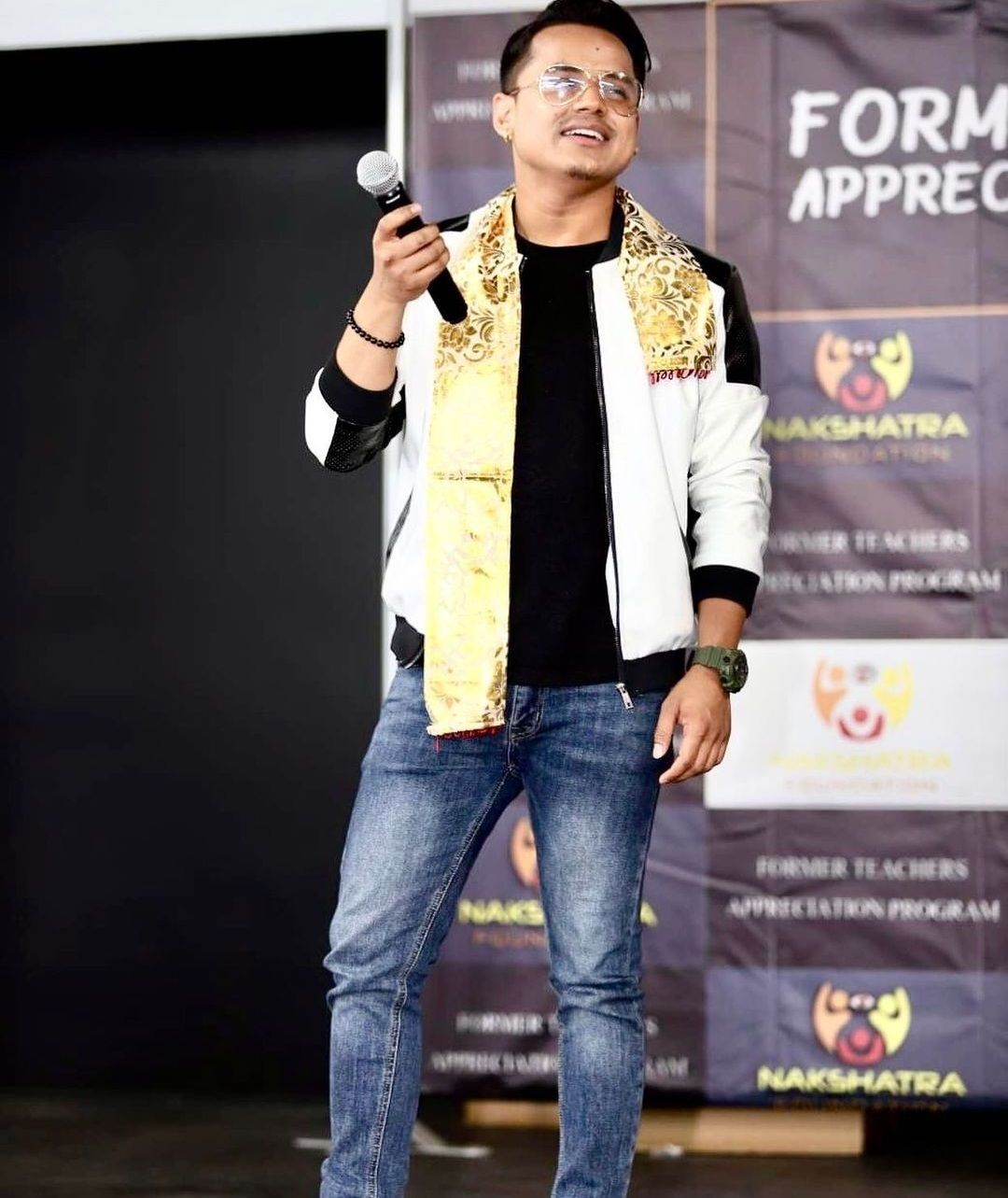

Background information
- Born: December 5, 1995 (age 30); Bhadrapur, Jhapa, Nepal
- Genre: Modern Classical, Semi Classical
- Occupations: Singer and composer
- Years active: 2013-present

Kiran Gajmer (Nepali: किरण गजमेर) is the winner of The Voice of Nepal season 3. He is an American singer of Nepalese-Bhutanese origin, and a composer who was born in the Khudunabari refugee camp in Bhadrapur, Jhapa, Nepal.

His parents were moved from Bhutan to Nepal in the 1990s and settled at Khudunabari camp.

== Singing career ==
Kiran Gajmer was born in Khudunabari refugee camp, Jhapa, on December 5, 1995. His parents were born in Bhutan and have been living as exile life as a refugee in eastern Nepal from 1992 until 2012. Kiran started singing at the age of 7 however he didn't record his official songs until 2013. He used to sing and participate in musical events every time there was an event in his middle school. He was 9 when he competed in junior singing competition inside the refugee camp and won the title. He has since sung more than 100 songs including songs that are pending release.

== After resettlement in the United States ==
Kiran resettled in the United States through the help of the international migration agency (IOM) in 2012. He continued his musical journey and was able to compose his first song in 2013 called "पुर्णिमाको चन्द्रमालाइ " which became very famous at that time. Since then, he has composed many songs and have sung more than a hundred songs. His notable song was with singer Melina Rai called "छपक्कै फुल फुल्यो " in a movie Radha. His other famous songs were "मर्छु सजिलै", "संग्लो यो मन", "बस माया नबोली नबोली" "ठुली ", "गाइ चरनैमा", "प्रेम दिवस", "म त डुब्दै डुब्दै" and "समाउ हात मेरो". He has been considered as one of the most versatile singers in Nipali music industry.
