= The Voice of Nepal =

Nepalese reality television series

- Genre: Reality competition
- Created by: John de Mol Jr.
- Based on: The Voice franchise
- Directed by: Laxman Paudyal
- Presented by: Sushil Nepal
- Country of origin: Nepal
- Original languages: English; Nepali
- No. of seasons: 7
- No. of episodes: 33

Production
- Executive producers: Pralhad Singh Mahat (seasons 1–2); Sushil Nepal; John De Mol
- Editors: Sohan Manandhar; Buddha Ratna Maharjan; Sajan Shahi; Bibek Basnet
- Running time: 160 minutes

Original release
- Network: Kantipur Television (2018); Ramailo HD (2018); Himalaya Television (2019–present)
- Release: 25 August 2018 – present

The Voice of Nepal
- Hosted by: Sushil Nepal (2018–present), Oshin Sitaula (2018)
- Coaches: Deep Shrestha (2018–2021); Sanup Paudel (2018); Abhaya Subba (2018); Pramod Kharel (2018–2024); Raju Lama (2019–2022, 2025); Astha Raut (2019); Trishna Gurung (2021); Rajesh Payal Rai (2022–2024); Prabisha Adhikari (2022); Sushant KC (2023); Khem Century (2025)
- Winners: CD Vijaya Adhikari (season 1); Ram Limbu (season 2); Kiran Gajmer, USA (season 3); Karan Rai, USA (Season 4) Binod Rai(season 5) Proshesh Pandey (season 6)
- Finals venue: Qatar season 1; Taragaon Open Field season 2; The Voice Studio season 3; The Voice Studio season 4; The Voice Studio season 6

Release
- Original network: Kantipur Television (2018) Ramailo HD (2018) Himalaya Television (2022–present)

The Voice of Nepal is a Nepalese reality show and the Nepalese format of the international TV singing reality series called The Voice. The show usually has four different coaches (judges), who eventually form four different teams after the selection event called the Blind Audition. Each team has to go through the battle round where contestants are paired with one another within the same team and only half of the total selected contestants from the blind audition are selected for the knockout round. During the knockout round, based on The Voice format, only the best and strongest contestants who their respective coach considers the best overall are selected by their coaches. They also have the sole right to do this on their own and take them to the live round (Voting Round). During the live round event, through a series of voting episodes, only one contestant with the most popular vote will advance to the grand finale. The first season of the voice of Nepal was won by CD Vijaya Adhikari from Team Deep, season 2 was won by Ram Limbu from Team Pramod and season 3 was won by Kiran Gajmer from Team Pramod. The Grand Finale of season 1 was held on 14 December 2018 in Qatar stadium, the second season's Grand Finale was held at Taragaon Open Field Chuchchepati, Kathmandu on 7 December 2019 and the third season's Grand Finale was held in The Voice Studio, Dhumbarahi. The Voice of Nepal was bought by Himalaya Television.

The host of the new series is Sushil Nepal (2018 onwards) and Oshin Sitoula (2018). The coaches have included

- Deep Shrestha (season 1–3)
- Sanup Poudel (season 1)
- Abhaya Subba (season 1)
- Pramod Kharel (season 1–5, 7–)
- Raju Lama (season 2–4, 6–)
- Astha Raut (season 2)
- Trishna Gurung (season 3)
- Prabisha Adhikari (season 4)
- Rajesh Payal Rai (season 3 as stand-in, 4-5)
- Uday Sotang (season 5–6)
- Khem Century (season 6–)
- Melina Rai (season 6–).

The series is directed by Laxman Paudyal, the former director of season one of Nepal's first international franchise singing reality show, Nepal Idol.

== Line-up of coaches ==
Coaches' line-up by chairs order
| Season | Year | Coaches | | | |
| Season | Year | 1 | 2 | 3 | 4 |
|---|---|---|---|---|---|
| 1 | 2018 | Pramod | Sanup | Abhaya | Deep |
| 2 | 2019 | Pramod | Astha | Raju | Deep |
| 3 | 2021 | Pramod | Deep* | Trishna | Raju |
| 4 | 2022 | Rajesh | Prabisha | Raju | Pramod |
| 5 | 2023-2024 | Pramod | Uday | Milan | Rajesh |
| 6 | 2025 | Raju | Khem | Melina | Uday |
| 7 | 2025-2026 | Pramod | Melina | Khem | Raju |
| 8 | 2026-2027 | Pramod | Naren | Milan | Ekdev |

*During season 3 (2021), Coach Deep was temporarily out of the show due to having COVID-19. During some of the Knockout rounds, Rajesh Payal Rai took his place as a stand-in coach, leading him to officially be a coach in seasons 4 and 5.

== Season summary ==
Teams color key
| Artist from Team Deep | Artist from Team Astha | Artist from Team Uday |
| Artist from Team Abhaya | Artist from Team Trishna | Artist from Team Khem |
| Artist from Team Sanup | Artist from Team Rajesh | Artist from Team Melina |
| Artist from Team Pramod | Artist from Team Prabisha |
| Artist from Team Raju | Artist from Team Milan |

| Season | Aired | Winner | Runner-up | Third Place | Fourth Place | Winning coach | Presenter |
|---|---|---|---|---|---|---|---|
| 1 | 2018 | CD Vijaya Adhikari | Kushal Acharya | Saptak Dutraj | Shrijay Thapaliya | Deep Shrestha | Sushil Nepal |
| 2 | 2019 | Ram Limbu | Bikash Limbu | Sanish Shrestha | Aarif Rauf | Pramod Kharel | Sushil Nepal |
| 3 | 2021 | Kiran Gajmer | Tara Shrees Magar | Aryan Tamang | Jwala Rai | Pramod Kharel | Sushil Nepal |
| 4 | 2022 | Karan Rai | Sabina Yohang | Yogesh Magar | Sahil Limbu | Raju Lama | Sushil Nepal |
| 5 | 2023-24 | Binod Rai | Makar Yonjan | Kumar Prayas Rai | Nogen Limbu | Milan Newar | Sushil Nepal |
| 6 | 2025 | Proshesh Pandey | Roshan Rai | Pramesh Rai | Arpana Acharya | Khem Century | Sushil Nepal |
| 7 | 2025-26 | Nita Kumari Thapa Magar | Sanjita Dura | Punam Gurung | Sagar Sansar Rai | Raju Lama | Sushil Nepal |

== Season 2 ==
The audition for The Voice of Nepal (season 2) was taken from The Voice of Nepal app for iOS and Android, and, for the first time, through various social media like Facebook as well. The coaches are Deep Shrestha, Pramod Kharel, Astha Raut and Raju Lama and the series is directed by Laxman Paudyal, the former director of season one of Nepal's first international franchise singing reality show, Nepal Idol. Abhaya Subba and Sanup Poudel were replaced in the season.

The season 2 of the show is broadcast on Himalaya Television. Ram Limbu from Team Pramod Kharel won The Voice of Nepal Season 2. The other finalists were Sanish Shrestha from Team Raju, Bikash Limbu from Team Deep, and Aarif Rauf from Team Astha.

As the winner, Limbu received a cash prize of NPR 1,000,000, a Datsun car, and a music album contract.

== Season 3 ==
=== Blind Audition (01) ===
Blind auditions for The Voice of Nepal season 3 started on 19 March 2021 on Himalaya HD Television; the final audition ended on Saturday, 17 April with more than 150 contestants anticipated throughout the audition round. As usual, for the battle round, this season's coaches have successfully secured 64 top performers through the audition round.

=== Battle Round (02) ===
The new episode (Battle Round) started on 24 April 2021 and ended on 15 May of the same year, where all 16 selected performers from each coach battled against each other in pairs; only nine including one steal were able to advance to the knockout round.

=== Knockout round (03) ===
The Knockout Round was started on Friday, 4 June and was aired until 25 June 2021. All nine selected contestants from each coach, including steal, were divided into three different groups; only one outstanding performer from each divided group, in total three, were selected for the live round.

=== Live Round (04) ===
The Live Round started 2 July and lasted until Saturday, 17 July. All three contestants from each coach went through a voting format where the contestants with the lowest vote had to leave the show every week and only one final contestant advanced to the Grand Finale.

=== Grand Finale or Final Round (05) ===
Only one contestant who advanced to the Finale from the live round through voting from each coach was able to join this round. All four remaining total contestants from four different coaches battled against each other; the talent with the highest worldwide vote was declared as the winner of The Voice of Nepal season 3. Kiran Gajmer was declared the winner, and with Tara Shrees Magar earning the position of first runner-up, the franchise also got its first female finalist.

=== Battle Round ===
==== Episode 11 (April 24) ====
| Order | Coach | Winner | Song | Loser | Coaches' and artists choices | | | |
| Order | Coach | Winner | Song | Loser | Deep | Trishna | Raju | Pramod |
|---|---|---|---|---|---|---|---|---|
| 1 | Trishna | "Top Raj Rai" | "Subash Timro" | "Sandesh Sitaula" | — | —N/a | — | |
| 2 | Raju | "Tara Shrees Magar" | "Sadhai Sadhai' | Niharika Gyawali | — | | —N/a | STEAL |
| 3 | Pramod | "Utsav Nepal" | "Oh Amira" x "Mayako Dorile" | "Srijasu Shrestha" | — | — | —N/a | |
| 4 | Deep | "Sujita Yonzon" | "Maya Namara" | "Bibek Ruchal" | —N/a | — | — | — |

==== Episode 12 (April 25) ====
| Order | Coach | Winner | Song | Loser | Coaches' and artists choices | | | |
| Order | Coach | Winner | Song | Loser | Deep | Trishna | Raju | Pramod |
|---|---|---|---|---|---|---|---|---|
| 1 | Trishna | "Jwala Rai" | "Hurukkai Bhayema" | "Ajay Karki" | — | —N/a | — | |
| 2 | Raju | "Urmila Kusunda" | "Runna Bhanthe Kahile" | "Nirmala Ghale" | — | | —N/a | — |
| 3 | Pramod | "Dharmendra Sunar" | "Parkha Parkha Mayalu" | "Barsha Thapa" | — | — | —N/a | |
| 4 | Deep | "Ishan Rai" | "Maisaab" | "Dhruba BK" | —N/a | — | — | — |

==== Episode 13 (April 30) ====
| Order | Coach | Winner | Song | Loser | Coaches' and artists choices | | | |
| Order | Coach | Winner | Song | Loser | Deep | Trishna | Raju | Pramod |
|---|---|---|---|---|---|---|---|---|
| 1 | Trishna | "Shreya Nepal" | "Kanchi Hey Kanchi" | "Santosh Kumar Baniya" | — | —N/a | — | |
| 2 | Raju | "Sonam Galtso Sherpa" | "Komal tyo timro" | "Abhishek Khadgi" | — | | —N/a | — |
| 3 | Pramod | "Melina Mainali" | "Ma Timilai Maya Garchu" | "Prabhu Bikram Thapa" | — | — | —N/a | |
| 4 | Deep | "Jenish Rai" | "Aansu ko Artha" | "Arman Lama" | —N/a | — | — | — |

==== Episode 14 (May 01) ====
| Order | Coach | Winner | Song | Loser | Coaches' and artists choices | | | |
| Order | Coach | Winner | Song | Loser | Deep | Trishna | Raju | Pramod |
|---|---|---|---|---|---|---|---|---|
| 1 | Trishna | "Sagar Hamal" | "Sirfula Siraima" | "Rojan Pariyar" | — | —N/a | — | |
| 2 | Raju | "Samrat Rajbhandari" | "Gahiro..." | "Subash Lama" | — | | —N/a | — |
| 3 | Pramod | "Deeksha Thapa" | "Tadha Bhaye pani" | "Dhruba Tamang" | — | — | STEAL | |
| 4 | Deep | "Govin Pun" | "Jail pani sahula" | "Sarmila Acharya" | —N/a | — | — | — |

==== Episode 15 (May 07) ====
| Order | Coach | Winner | Song | Loser | Coaches' and artists choices | | | |
| Order | Coach | Winner | Song | Loser | Deep | Trishna | Raju | Pramod |
|---|---|---|---|---|---|---|---|---|
| 1 | Trishna | "Suraksha Malla" | "Timi Aayeu" | "Suman Nepali" | — | —N/a | — | |
| 2 | Raju | "Bijaya Thada Magar" | "Din Ra Raat" | "Kapil Pun" | — | | —N/a | — |
| 3 | Pramod | "Kiran Gajmer" | "Janam Janam Jiyula Sangai" | "Suraksha Sinchuri" | — | STEAL | —N/a | |
| 4 | Deep | "Priya Gurung" | "Naboli Naboli" | "Umesh Chhetri" | —N/a | — | — | — |

==== Episode 16 (May 08) ====
| Order | Coach | Winner | Song | Loser | Coaches' and artists choices | | | |
| Order | Coach | Winner | Song | Loser | Deep | Trishna | Raju | Pramod |
|---|---|---|---|---|---|---|---|---|
| 1 | Trishna | Afrita Khadgi | Timro Yaad | Shriya Rawal Chetri | — | —N/a | — | |
| 2 | Raju | Nabin Gazmer | Halla Chalecha | Yog Bahadur Tamang | — | | —N/a | — |
| 3 | Pramod | Ravi Gahatraj | Mayaa.. | Sanju Moktan | — | — | —N/a | |
| 4 | Deep | Bijay Bhandari | Badha Mayale | Pramila (Sangeeta) Ranapayali | —N/a | — | — | — |

==== Episode 17 (May 14) ====
| Order | Coach | Winner | Song | Loser | Coaches' and artists choices | | | |
| Order | Coach | Winner | Song | Loser | Deep | Trishna | Raju | Pramod |
|---|---|---|---|---|---|---|---|---|
| 1 | Trishna | "Karna Raj Giri" | "Aaj hamro bhet bhako din" | "Sameera Thapaliya" | — | —N/a | — | |
| 2 | Raju | "Sandeep Rai" | "Nachaheko Hoina" | "Kushal Shrestha" | STEAL | | —N/a | — |
| 3 | Pramod | "Sudita Rai" | " Manchheko Maya" | "Abhishek Baraily Biswokarma" | — | — | —N/a | |
| 4 | Deep | "Sunil Thapa Magar" | "Korera Prem Patra" | "Sova Tamang" | —N/a | — | — | — |

==== Episode 18 (May 15) ====
| Order | Coach | Winner | Song | Loser | Coaches' and artists choices | | | |
| Order | Coach | Winner | Song | Loser | Deep | Trishna | Raju | Pramod |
|---|---|---|---|---|---|---|---|---|
| 1 | Trishna | "Abhi Dong" | "Maya Ta Maya Ho" | " Elina Udas" | — | —N/a | — | |
| 2 | Raju | "Ganbir Budha Magar" | "Maile Socheko jastai" | "Laxmi Syangtan" | — | | —N/a | — |
| 3 | Pramod | "Bikki Pariyar" | "Daiba Hey" | " Ashim Thapa " | — | — | —N/a | |
| 4 | Deep | "Aryan Tamang" | "Namana laaj " | "Laboni Chakraborti" | —N/a | — | — | — |

Coaches' teams after the Battle Round. (Stolen artists at the bottom).

| Season | Team Trishna | Team Deep | Team Pramod | Team Raju |
|---|---|---|---|---|
| 3 | "TopRaj Rai", "Jwala Rai", "Shreya Nepal", "Sagar Hamal", "Suraksha Malla","Abhi Dong", "Karna Raj Giri", "Afrida Khadgi"+"Suraksha Sinchuri-from steal" | "Sujita Yonzan", "Ishan Rai", " Jenish Rai", "Govin Pun","Bijay Bhandari", "Sunil Thapa Magar", "Aryan Tamang", "Priya Gurung" "Kushal Shrestha-from steal" | "Utsav Nepal", "Dharmendra Sunar", "Melina Mainali", "Deeksha Thapa", "Kiran Gajmer", "Ravi Gahatraj", 'Sudita Rai', "Bikki Pariyar", +"Niharika Gyawali-from steal" | "Tara Shresh Magar", "Urmila Kusunda", "Sonam Galtso Sherpa", "Samrat Rajbhandari", "Bijaya Thada Magar"," Nabin Gajmer", "Sandeep Rai", "Ganbir Budha Magar" + "Dhruba Tamang-from steal" |

=== Knockout round ===
| Order | Coach | Artist | Song | Result |
|---|---|---|---|---|
| 1 | Trishna | Karna Raj Giri | "[Samaya le Aaja Malai]" | Advanced |
| 2 | Trishna | Suraksha Sinchuri | "[ Teenpatey Dada katera]" | Eliminated |
| 3 | Trishna | Sagar Hamal | "[Timi Bina Mandaina]" | Eliminated |
| 1 | Pramod | Sudita Rai | "[Timi Aayeu]" | Eliminated |
| 2 | Pramod | Kiran Gajmer | "[Birsera Feri Malai-Jhapak Taal]" | Advanced |
| 3 | Pramod | Melina Mainali | "[Yesto Pani Hudo Raicha]" | Eliminated |
| 1 | Deep* | Jenish Rai | "[Fulbutte Sari]" | Advanced |
| 2 | Deep* | Bijaya Bhandari | "[Sunana Timi.]" | Eliminated |
| 3 | Deep* | Ishan Rai | "[Timro Mutuma]" | Eliminated |
| 1 | Raju | Ganbir Budha Magar | "[Muglan Hera Jadaichu]" | Eliminated |
| 2 | Raju | Samrat Raj Bhandari | "[Bheda Ko Un Jasto]" | Eliminated |
| 3 | Raju | Sonam Galtso Sherpa | "[Nachodnu Yo Saath]" | Advanced |

| Order | Coach | Artist | Song | Result |
|---|---|---|---|---|
| 1 | Trishna | Jwala Rai | "[Jindagi ko Batoma]" | Advanced |
| 2 | Trishna | Suraksha Malla | "[its gotta be love..]" | Eliminated |
| 3 | Trishna | Shreya Nepal | "[Gayina Dajaile.]" | Eliminated |
| 1 | Pramod | Dharmendra Sunar | "[Humla Kahile Motor..]" | Eliminated |
| 2 | Pramod | Ravi Gahatraj | "[Babako Topi Ganayo..]" | Advanced |
| 3 | Pramod | Bikki Pariyar | "[Sayau Juni]" | Eliminated |
| 1 | Deep* | Aryan Tamang | "[Timilai ma k bhanu.]" | Advanced |
| 2 | Deep* | Sujita Yonzal | "[Jahile Samma..]" | Eliminated |
| 3 | Deep* | Sunil Thapa Magar | "[Aawo Yaad Haru..]" | Eliminated |
| 1 | Raju | Dhruba Tamang | "[Jyanai Khayo tyo mori..]" | Eliminated |
| 2 | Raju | Urmila Kusunda | "[Fula ko Thunga..]" | Eliminated |
| 3 | Raju | Tara Shrees Magar | "[Samjhine Mutu..]" | Advanced |

| Order | Coach | Artist | Song | Result |
|---|---|---|---|---|
| 1 | Trishna | Afrida Khadgi | "[Muskaan....]" | Advanced |
| 2 | Trishna | Abi Dong | "[Ko Hun Ma..]" | Eliminated |
| 3 | Trishna | Top Raj Rai | "[Laayeu Timle..]" | Eliminated |
| 1 | Pramod | Utsav Nepal | "[Man Saili Timi..]" | Eliminated |
| 2 | Pramod | Niharika Gyawali | "[Malai Disakeko Dil..]" | Advanced |
| 3 | Pramod | Dekshya Thapa | "[Priti Basyo...]" | Eliminated |
| 1 | Deep* | Govin Pun | "[Samjhanama Dubiyera..]" | Advanced |
| 2 | Deep* | Kushal Shrestha | "[Dhaka Topi Siraima]" | Eliminated |
| 3 | Deep* | Priya Gurung | "[Sagar Baru Sukera Jaijala]" | Eliminated |
| 1 | Raju | Nabin Gajmer | "[Fewa Taal Ma Saili..]" | Eliminated |
| 2 | Raju | Sandesh Rai | "[Aansu Piyera..]" | Eliminated |
| 3 | Raju | Bijay Thada Magar | "[Malai Angali deu..]" | Advanced |

*During some of the Knockouts, decisions were made by stand-in coach Rajesh Payal Rai.

Coaches' teams after the knockout round.

| Season | Team Trishna | Team Deep | Team Pramod | Team Raju |
|---|---|---|---|---|
| 3 | "Jwala Rai", "Karna Raj Giri", "Afrida Khadgi" | "Jenish Rai", "Govin Poon", "Aryan Tamang" | "Kiran Gajmer", "Neharika Gyawali", "Ravi Gahatraj" | "Tara Shreesh Magar", "Sonam Galtso Sherpa", "Bijaya Thada Magar"," |

=== Live Round ===
Weekly results per artist
| Contestant | | Week 1 | Week 2 | Week 3 | Week 4 | Grand Finale |
|---|---|---|---|---|---|---|
| Contestant | | Week 1 | Week 2 | Quarter Final | Semi Final | |
| 01 | Kiran Gajmer | | Advanced top 8 | Advanced Top 4 | Advanced Top 4 | Winner |
| 03 | Tara Shreesh Magar | | Advanced top 8 | Advanced Top 4 | Advanced Top 4 | 2nd Position by vote caste |
| 02 | Aryan Tamang | | Advanced top 8 | Advanced Top 4 | Advanced Top 4 | 3rd Position by vote caste |
| 04 | Jwala Rai | | Advanced top 8 | Advanced Top 4 | Advanced Top 4 | 4th Position by vote caste |
| 05 | Rabi Gahatraj | | Advanced top 8 | ELIMINATED- Top 8 | | |
| 06 | Govin Pun | | Advanced top 8 | ELIMINATED-Top 8 | | |
| 07 | Sonam Sherpa | | Advanced top 8 | ELIMINATED-Top 8 | | |
| 08 | Afrita Khagdi | | Advanced top 8 | ELIMINATED-Top 8 | | |
| 09 | Niharika Gyawali | | ELIMINATED -Top 12 | | | |
| 10 | Bijay Thada Magar | | ELIMINATED-Top 12 | | | |
| 11 | Karna Raj Giri | | ELIMINATED-Top 12 | | | |
| 12 | Jenish Rai | | ELIMINATED-Top 12 | | | |

Weekly results per artist
| Contestant | | Week 1 | Week 2 | Week 3 | week 4 | Grand Finale |
|---|---|---|---|---|---|---|
| Contestant | | Week 1 | Week 2 | Quarter Final | Semi Final | |
| 01 | Kiran Gajmer | | | Top 8 | Selected for Top 4 | Winner |
| 02 | Aryan Tamang | | | Top 8 | Selected for Top 4 | 2nd Runner Up |
| 03 | Tara Shreesh Magar | | | Top 8 | Selected for Top 4 | 1st Runner Up |
| 04 | Jwala Rai | | | Top 8 | Selected for top 4 | 3rd Runner Up |
| 05 | Rabi Gahatraj | | | ELIMINATED- Top 8 | | |
| 06 | Govin Pun | | | ELIMINATED-Top 8 | | |
| 07 | Sonam Sherpa | | | ELIMINATED-Top8 | | |
| 08 | Afrita Khagdi | | | ELIMINATED-Top8 | | |
| 09 | Niharika Gyawali | | ELIMINATED -Top 12 | | | |
| 10 | Bijay Thada Magar | | ELIMINATED-Top 12 | | | |
| 11 | Karna Raj Giri | | ELIMINATED-Top 12 | | | |
| 12 | Jenish Rai | | ELIMINATED-Top 12 | | | |

== Season 4 ==
The digital audition for season 4 was started from April 29 to May 15, 2022. There are four coaches in this season :- Pramod Kharel, Raju Lama, Prabisha Adhikari & Rajesh Payal Rai. Among the four coaches, Pramod Kharel has won three voice winning awards including both seasons of TVON Kids.

| Season 4 | Team Pramod | Team Prabisha | Team Raju | Team Rajesh |
|---|---|---|---|---|
| Winner | | | Karan Rai | |
| 1st runner up | | | | Sabina Yonghang |
| 2nd runner up | Yogesh Magar | | | |
| 3rd runner up | | Sahil Limbu | | |

== Season 5 ==
The official Facebook page of The Voice of Nepal (VON) revealed the announcement for the digital audition of season 5. The season introduced two fresh faces: Milan Newar from VON Kids and Uday Sotang, who joined as the new coaches alongside Pramod Kharel and Rajesh Payal Rai.

The winner of The Voice of Nepal season 5 was Binod Rai, who was from team Milan (giving the franchise its first female winning coach). The runner-ups were Makar Bahadur Yonjan from team Rajesh, Kumar Prayas Rai from team Uday, and Nogen Limbu from team Pramod, respectively.

== Season 6 ==
The official Facebook page of The Voice of Nepal (VON) revealed the announcement for the digital audition of season 6.

The Physical audition also known as blind audition aired on January 17, 2025, on Himalaya Television and on Voice of Nepal's official YouTube channel.

=== Blind Audition ===
Coaches Teams After Audition
| Coach Raju | Coach Khem | Coach Melina | Coach Uday |
|---|---|---|---|
| Arbind Poudel Chhetri; Birat Tamang; Deepak Gajmer; Kamaljeet Singh; Pampha Chamling Rai; Prakash Bantawa Rai; Pramesh Rai; Pranip Baral Magar; Prashant Gurung; Reshmi Magar; Samjana Yohang Limbu; Saroj Yonjan; Sarthak Lama; Semon Khadka; Suraj Tamang; Yonjana Rai | Allam Addesh; Anil Shrestha; Anjuli Hamal; Chiranjibi Rana; Indra Kala Rai; Jasmine Baral; Kuldip Rai; Mana Nepali; Muna Khadka; Pabindra Sunar; Phurwa Tamang; Prachi Bidari; Prajwal Karki; Proshesh Pandey; Ruben Rai; Sumit Sunam | Abanish Giri; Ashim Chhetri; Avishek Rai; Bikash Tharu; Gagan Ale; Mani Sundar Limbu; Milan Budha Magar; Nabin Darnal; Pritam Gurung; Priyanka Thapa; Rajesh Limbu; Roshan Rai; Sagar Hamal; Sanchita Nepali; Sudesh Rai; Sunil RD Bk | Aashish Sharma; Arpana Acharya; Dawa Tamang; Hari Luitel; Mingsho Kerung Limbu; Narbada Lakandri; Pittu Gahatraj; Prabha Rai; Pradip Rai; Prashant Pokharel; Pratik Himal Rai; Siddhant Sahani; Sujan Khadka; Sushil Khadka; Tashi Phincho Moktan; Yojana Khadki |

=== Battle Round ===
Winner
Loser
Steal

==== Episode 11 (February 21) ====
| Order | Coach | Winner | Song | Loser | Steal |
|---|---|---|---|---|---|
| 1 | Melina | Bikash Tharu | Charile Ta | Ashim Chhetri | NONE |
| 2 | Khem | Anil Shrestha | Baimaani | Ruben Rai | NONE |
| 3 | Raju | Prashant Gurung | Sparsha Sangeet | Arbind Poudel Chhetri | NONE |
| 4 | Uday | Dawa Tamang | Timle soche Bhanda Dherai | Narbada Lakandri | NONE |

==== Episode 12 (February 22) ====
| Order | Coach | Winner | Song | Loser | Steal |
|---|---|---|---|---|---|
| 1 | Uday | Tashi Phincho Moktan | Ke yo Maya Ho | Sushil Khadka | Coach Uday; STEAL; Pranip Baral Magar |
| 2 | Melina | Rajesh Limbu | Aaja Man Udera Bhagchha | Abanish Giri | Coach Uday; STEAL; Pranip Baral Magar |
| 3 | Khem | Indrakala Rai | Simsime Panima | Kuldip Rai | Coach Uday; STEAL; Pranip Baral Magar |
| 4 | Raju | Semon Khadka | Ma Sansar Jitne | Pranip Baral Magar | Coach Uday; STEAL; Pranip Baral Magar |

==== Episode 13 (February 28) ====
| Order | Coach | Winner | Song | Loser | Steal |
|---|---|---|---|---|---|
| 1 | Uday | Prabha Rai | Chitko Gunyo Timile Lagauda | Mingsho Kerung Limbu | NONE |
| 2 | Raju | Kamaljeet Singh | Maya Ta Maya Ho | Yonjana Rai | NONE |
| 3 | Khem | Proshesh Pandey | Maan Pareko Manchhe | Prachi Bidari | NONE |
| 4 | Melina | Sunil RD BK | Timro Aagaman Le | Milan Budha Magar | NONE |

==== Episode 14 (March 1) ====
| Order | Coach | Winner | Song | Loser | Steal |
|---|---|---|---|---|---|
| 1 | Raju | Pramesh Rai | Babari Rang | Samjana Yohang Limbu | Coach Raju; STEAL; Siddhant Sahani |
| 2 | Khem | Prajwal Karki | Timle Dine Maya | Mana Nepali | Coach Raju; STEAL; Siddhant Sahani |
| 3 | Melina | Sanchita Nepali | Resham | Gagan Ale | Coach Raju; STEAL; Siddhant Sahani |
| 4 | Uday | Arpana Acharya | Ukalima Pachhi Pachhi | Siddhant Sahani | Coach Raju; STEAL; Siddhant Sahani |

==== Episode 15 (March 7) ====
| Order | Coach | Winner | Song | Loser | Steal |
|---|---|---|---|---|---|
| 1 | Uday | Sujan Khadka | Man Chhade Maichyang | Pittu Gahatraj | Coach Melina; STEAL; Sarthak Lama |
| 2 | Melina | Pritam Gurung | Ukali Orali Gardai | Mani Sundar Limbu | Coach Melina; STEAL; Sarthak Lama |
| 3 | Khem | Anjuli Hamal | Chatta Rumal Kyamalum | Chiranjibi Rana | Coach Melina; STEAL; Sarthak Lama |
| 4 | Raju | Birat Tamang | Basa Sundari | Sarthak Lama | Coach Melina; STEAL; Sarthak Lama |

==== Episode 16 (march 8) ====
| Order | Coach | Winner | Song | Loser | Steal |
|---|---|---|---|---|---|
| 1 | Raju | Deepak Gajmer | Eh Kancha Thattai Ma | Pampha Chamling Rai | None |
| 2 | Khem | Pabindra Sunar | Kafal Gedi Kuttukai | Muna Khadka | None |
| 3 | Melina | Roshan Rai | Chalecha Batas Sustari | Sudesh Rai | None |

| Order | Coach | Winner | Winner | Song | Loser | Steal |
|---|---|---|---|---|---|---|
| 4 | Uday | Prashant Pokharel | Yojana Khadki | Timi deu Ya Nadeu | Hari Luitel | NONE |

Due to Pradip Rai from Coach Uday's team having to leave unexpectedly, the team was reduced to 15 contestants. To address this, three contestants competed, and based on the coach's decision, Prashant Pokharel and Yojana Khadki advanced to the next round, while Hari Luitel was eliminated.

==== Episode 17 (march 14) ====
| Order | Coach | Winner | Song | Loser | Steal |
|---|---|---|---|---|---|
| 1 | Raju | Saroj Yonjan | Aankhaima Jhalajhali | Reshmi Magar | Coach Khem; STEAL; Sagar Hamal |
| 2 | Khem | Phurwa Tamang | Lampate Surati | Jasmine Baral | Coach Khem; STEAL; Sagar Hamal |
| 3 | Melina | Priyanka Thapa | Mero Manaiko Phool tipi | Sagar Hamal | Coach Khem; STEAL; Sagar Hamal |
| 4 | Uday | Pratik Himal Rai | mero Aankhama | Aashish Sharma | Coach Khem; STEAL; Sagar Hamal |

==== Episode 18(March 15) ====
| Order | Coach | Winner | Song | Loser | Steal |
|---|---|---|---|---|---|
| 1 | Khem | Allam Addesh | Aasu Jharadina Ma | Sumit Sunam | NONE ALL STEALS USED UP |
| 2 | Raju | Prakash Bantawa Rai | Sumnima | Suraj Tamang | NONE ALL STEALS USED UP |
| 3 | Melina | Nabin Darnal | Sakchau Bhane Bish Deu | Avishek Rai | NONE ALL STEALS USED UP |

==== Coaches Team After Battle Round ====
Contestants in black belong to the original team, while those in blue were stolen from another team.

| Coach Raju | Coach Khem | Coach Melina | Coach Uday |
|---|---|---|---|
| Prashant Gurung; Semon Khadka; Kamaljeet Singh; Pramesh Rai; Birat Tamang; Deepak Gajmer; Saroj Yonjan; Prakash Bantawa Rai; Siddhant Sahani | Anil Shrestha; Indrakala Rai; Proshesh Pandey; Prajwal karki Anjuli Hamal; Pabindra Sunar; Phurwa Tamang; Allam Addesh; Sagar Hamal | Bikash Tharu; Rajesh Limbu; Sunil RD BK; Sanchita Nepali; Pritam Gurung; Roshan Rai; Priyanka Thapa; Nabin Darnal; Sarthak Lama | Dawa Tamang; Tashi Phincho Moktan; Prabha Rai; Arpana Acharya; Sujan Khadka; Prashant Pokharel; Yojana Khadki; Pratik Himal Rai; Pranip Baral Magar |

=== Knockout Round ===
Advanced
Eliminated

==== Coach Uday's Knockout (ep: 19) ====
| Order | Artist | Song | Result |
|---|---|---|---|
| 1 | Prabha Rai | Manai mero Changa | Eliminated |
| 2 | Pranip Baral Magar | Sanu ma | Eliminated |
| 3 | Arpana Acharya | Jhuto Aasha | Advanced |

| Order | Artist | Song | Result |
|---|---|---|---|
| 1 | Tashi Phincho Moktan | Timro Nyano (Aaudai Jaadai) | Eliminated |
| 2 | Dawa Tamang | Timilai Harne Bani Paryo | Advanced |
| 3 | Yojana Khadki | Yo Dui Thopa Aansu | Eliminated |

| Order | Artist | Song | Result |
|---|---|---|---|
| 1 | Prashant Pokharel | Dharti Bhari Khojda Khojda | Eliminated |
| 2 | Pratik Himal Rai | Chhaina Maile | Eliminated |
| 3 | Sujan Khadka | Hawa Sanga | Advanced |

==== Coach Raju's Knockout (ep: 20) ====
| Order | Artist | Song | Result |
|---|---|---|---|
| 1 | Deepak Gajmer | Para Laijau Phool Haru | Eliminated |
| 2 | Prakash Bantawa Rai | Prashna | Eliminated |
| 3 | Birat Tamang | Samarpan | Advanced |

| Order | Artist | Song | Result |
|---|---|---|---|
| 1 | Prashant Gurung | Farkanna Hola | Advanced |
| 2 | Kamaljeet Singh | Tulsi Aanganma | Eliminated |
| 3 | Semon Khadka | Nihita | Eliminated |

| Order | Artist | Song | Result |
|---|---|---|---|
| 1 | Siddhant Sahani | Laija Re | Eliminated |
| 2 | Saroj Yohang | Prayas | Eliminated |
| 3 | Pramesh Rai | Fijeko Kesh | Advanced |

==== Coach Melina's Knockout (ep: 21) ====
| Order | Artist | Song | Result |
|---|---|---|---|
| 1 | Bikash Tharu | Sagar Baru Sukera Gai Jala | Advanced |
| 2 | Sunil RD BK | Kaha Thiyau Timi | Eliminated |
| 3 | Sanchita Nepali | Kaso Kaso Maya Basyo | Eliminated |

| Order | Artist | Song | Result |
|---|---|---|---|
| 1 | Priyanka Thapa | Damphu Ma Selo | Eliminated |
| 2 | Pritam Gurung | Soltini Bhani Bolako | Eliminated |
| 3 | Roshan Rai | Timro Jasto Mutu | Advanced |

| Order | Artist | Song | Result |
|---|---|---|---|
| 1 | Rajesh Limbu | Aao Yaadharu | Eliminated |
| 2 | Nabin Darnal | Jau Ki Basu | Eliminated |
| 3 | Sarthak Lama | Sadhai Sadhai | Advanced |

==== Coach Khem's Knockout (ep: 22) ====
| Order | Artist | Song | Result |
|---|---|---|---|
| 1 | Pabindra Sunar | Mero Pani Haina Ra Yo Desh | Advanced |
| 2 | Anil Shrestha | Shishir Jhai | Eliminated |
| 3 | Sagar Hamal | Hitakari Mayalai Bolaudai | Eliminated |

| Order | Artist | Song | Result |
|---|---|---|---|
| 1 | Proshesh Pandey | Bihana Uthne Bitikai | Advanced |
| 2 | Allam Addesh | Saara Khushi | Eliminated |
| 3 | Anjuli Hamal | Yeti Dherai Maya | Eliminated |

| Order | Artist | Song | Result |
|---|---|---|---|
| 1 | Prajwal karki | Timilai Ma K Bhanu | Eliminated |
| 2 | Phurwa Tamang | Doori Majboori | Eliminated |
| 3 | Indrakala Rai | Mann Ki Chari Udi Udi | Advanced |

==== Coaches Team After Knockout Round ====
| Coach Raju | Coach Khem | Coach Melina | Coach Uday |
|---|---|---|---|
| Birat Tamang; Prashant Gurung; Pramesh Rai | Pabindra Sunar; Proshesh Pandey; Indrakala Rai | Bikash Tharu; Roshan Rai; Sarthak Lama | Arpana Acharya; Dawa Tamang; Sujan Khadka |

=== Live Round ===
| Artists | Week 1 | | Week 2 | | Week 3 | | Week 4 | | Finale |
| Artists | Round 1 | Round 2 | Round 1 | Round 2 | Round 1 | Round 2 | Round 1 | Round 2 | Finale |
|---|---|---|---|---|---|---|---|---|---|
| Proshesh Pandey | | | | | | | | | Winner |
| Roshan Rai | | | | | | | | | Runner Up |
| Pramesh Rai | | | | | | | | | Third Place |
| Arpana Acharya | | | | | | | | | Fourth Place |
| Indrakala Rai | | | | | | | | Eliminated | Eliminated week 4 |
| Sarthak Lama | | | | | | | Eliminated | Eliminated week 4 | |
| Dawa Tamang | | | | | | Eliminated | Eliminated week 3 | | |
| Birat Tamang | | | | | Eliminated | Eliminated week 3 | | | |
| Bikash Tharu | | | | Eliminated | Eliminated week 2 | | | | |
| Sujan Khadka | | | Eliminated | Eliminated week 2 | | | | | |
| Prashant Gurung | | Eliminated | Eliminated week 1 | | | | | | |
| Pabindra Sunar | Eliminated | Eliminated week 1 | | | | | | | |

== Season 7 ==
The official YouTube channel of The Voice of Nepal (VON) has announced three of the four coaches for the upcoming Season 7. Coach Pramod will be joining the team after being absent from Season 6 of The Voice of Nepal and Season 4 of The Voice of Nepal Kids. From The Voice of Nepal Kids, Coach Melina and Coach Khem will also serve as coaches this season. On September 4, 2025, The Voice of Nepal announced that Raju Lama will be joining as the fourth coach. This sets up an exciting season, with all four coaches already having championship titles: Pramod Kharel (Seasons 2 and 3; Kids Seasons 1, 2, and 3), Raju Lama (Season 4), Khem Century (Season 6), and Melina Rai (Kids Season 4).

Nita Kumari Thapa Magar was named the winner of Voice of Nepal Season 7 on February 14, 2026, giving Coach Raju Lama his second championship victory and the adult version of the show its first female winner.

== The Voice Kids ==
The Voice of Kids is a junior version of The Voice of Nepal based on the original Dutch version. Contestants are required to be between the ages of 6 and 14. The show is presented by both Sushil Nepal from the generic version, and emcee and model Roneeshma Shrestha. VON Kids gave the franchise its first female winner (Anuhya Tamang, S3), and its first female coach/female winner pair (Sonali Rajbhandari/Melina Rai, S4).

Nepalese The Voice Kids series overview
| Season | First aired | Last aired | Winner | Runner-up | Third place | Fourth place | Winning coach | Presenter | Coaches (chairs' order) | | | |
| Season | First aired | Last aired | Winner | Runner-up | Third place | Fourth place | Winning coach | Presenter | 1 | 2 | 3 | 4 |
|---|---|---|---|---|---|---|---|---|---|---|---|---|
| 1 | Nov 12, 2021 | Jan 15, 2022 | Jenish Upreti | Susami Gurung | Suprim Malla Thakuri | Minchhama Rai | Pramod Kharel | Sushil Nepal | Raju | Prabisha | Milan | Pramod |
| 2 | Mar 10, 2023 | May 19, 2023 | Spandan Subba | Note: Seven artists finished second in series two. | | | Pramod Kharel | Sushil Nepal | Pramod | Milan | Sushant | Prabisha |
| 3 | Jun 14, 2024 | Aug 17, 2024 | Anuhya Tamang | Note: Seven artists finished second in series three. | | | Pramod Kharel | Roneeshma Shrestha | Pramod | Melina | Milan | Chhewang |
| 4 | Jun 13, 2025 | Aug 9, 2025 | Sonali Rajbhandari | Note: Seven artists finished second in series four. (Note: Team Milan: Aieen Rai, Nischal Limbu; Team Satya: Ridam Khadka, Smayan Bajgain; Team Melina: Naren Loye Chetri; Team Khem: Aadarsha Dhital, Diliza Ruwali) | | | Melina Rai | Nepal & Shrestha | Milan | Satya | Melina | Khem |
| 5 | Jun 12, 2026 | Aug 15, 2026 | Subashna Khadka | Note: Seven artists finished second in series five. (Note: Team Milan: Pranjal Dhungel, Ruisang Pakhrin; Team Wangden: Kriyasan Roka; Team Arjun: Aanvi Bista, Aarman Karki; Team Satya: Kabina Rai, Samrat Khanal) | | | Wangden Sherpa | Nepal & Shrestha | Milan | Wangden | Arjun | Satya |
| 6 | Jun 11, 2027 | Upcoming season | | | | | | Nepal & Shrestha | Milan | Arjun | Bishnu | Satya |

== Controversy ==
- Prior to the start of the second season, Abhaya Subba published a video titled "Dear Voice of Nepal, Give the right reasons.....", alleging malpractice in the management of the show. She asserted that the show annexed her as the judge in the second season without prior informing them.
- After end of the second season, Top 4 contestant Bikash Limbu was rejected for the world tour which created controversy among show makers; the tour company and management department denied to clarify this controversy.
- After both Kids S3/S4 and generic S3/S4, there was a lot of controversy about contestants from abroad winning over local contestants, as winners from all four of those seasons came from the US to Nepal to compete (with three out of the four having heavy support from the Bhutanese-Nepali diaspora), and social media often took to calling the show "Voice of Dollar", etc. While the team has not addressed this, it is a result of the unlimited voting system.

== See also ==
- Nepal Idol
