= Astha Raut =

Nepalese singer

- आस्था राउत
- Born: Dolakha, Nepal
- Education: Bachelor Degree in Journalism & Mass Communication
- Occupation: Singer

Astha Raut (Nepali: आस्था राउत) is a Nepali singer. Her first hit song was a remix song Saal Ko Paata Tapari (सालकाे पात टपरी) from a collection album Addiction 2. She received the Hits FM Music Best Female Pop Vocal Award in 2014. Her second song Maya Yo Maya (माया याे माया) was from the movie Maya's Bar. Two of her songs Chaubandi Ma Patuki and Jhumke Bulaki from her album Aadhar released on 17 Asad 2070 (BS) became superhits. She has also sung many playback songs in Nepali films. Astha Raut is one of the coaches in The Voice of Nepal Season 2 (2019). Her second album Aadhar 2 was launched on 28 November 2019.

== Early life and background ==
Astha is the daughter of Nepali folk singer Hari Bahadur Raut and lyricist Sabitri Raut. She was born in kathmandu capital of Nepal on 30 April (17th baisakh). She completed her school and high school in Kathmandu for her higher studies and received a bachelor's degree from CG Manipal Campion College. She was interested in singing and dancing since childhood and participated in many singing competitions and won many of them.

== Aadhar album songs ==
Adhar Bhag-1

- Jhumke Bulaki
- Teen Mohar Ko Dhago
- Kadam Chala
- Ma Ruda
- Birsi Deu
- Chaubandi Ma Patuki
- Phatyo Ni Maiti Ko Chino

Adhar Bhag-2

- Ko cha Yaha
- Nakai ma Fuli
- Kampany Mala
- Ram Saile
- Simana
- Hawaijahaj ko Tiket
- Dashain Ayo Tihar Ayo

== Movie film songs ==
- Maya Yo Maya (Maya's Bar)
- Chalak Chalak (Dhuwani)
- Baal Matlab (Lanka)

== Awards ==
- Best Pop Female Vocal (Hits FM Music Award 2014)
- Best Pop Female Vocal (Image Award 2014)
- Best Pop Female Vocal (Kantipur Honours)
