= Lahachok =

Lahachowk लाहाचोक
- Location in Nepal Lahachowk (Nepal)
- Coordinates: 28.31°N 83.92°E
- Country: Nepal
- Zone: Gandaki Zone
- District: Kaski District
- Gaunpalika (Rural Municipality): Machhapuchchhre
- Ward: Machhapuchchhre - 4

Population (1991)
  - Total: 3,188
- Time zone: UTC+5:45 (Nepal Time)

Lahachowk (Nepali : लाहाचोक ) is a village in Machhapuchchhre Gaunpalika, in the Kaski District, in the Gandaki Zone of northern-central Nepal. According to the 2011 National Population and Housing Census, it had a population of 3,129 in 829 individual households.

Lahachowk is not far from Mount Machhapuchchhre, a mountain in the Annapurna Himal. The village is at the altitude of 1,200 metres (3,937 ft) above sea level. It is about 13 km (8 mi) north-west of Pokhara. The village is ethnically and culturally diverse. Major ethnic groups in the village are Brahmin (43%), Dalit (28%), Chhetri (including Thakuri) (14%), and indigenous groups such as Gurung, Newar and Magar. The society is largely based on a caste structure. Higher castes like Brahmin and Chhetri have greater access to and control over resources and means of production. The people of higher caste generally have a higher educational status. The Hindu religion predominates, followed by Buddhism and a small number of Christians. The society in Lahachowk is a patriarchal one. The major occupation in the village is agriculture, which occupies around 46.7% of the population. Next are the labourers, up to 30.9%. Around 5.3% are working abroad, and government jobs account for 4.9%. Other jobs occupy around 11.5%, while business accounts for just 0.7%.Madhusudhan Adhikari is the ward chairperson of the village along with elected ward members like Shreedevi, Rabi Adhikari and 2 others.
