= Rajesh Payal Rai =

Nepalese singer

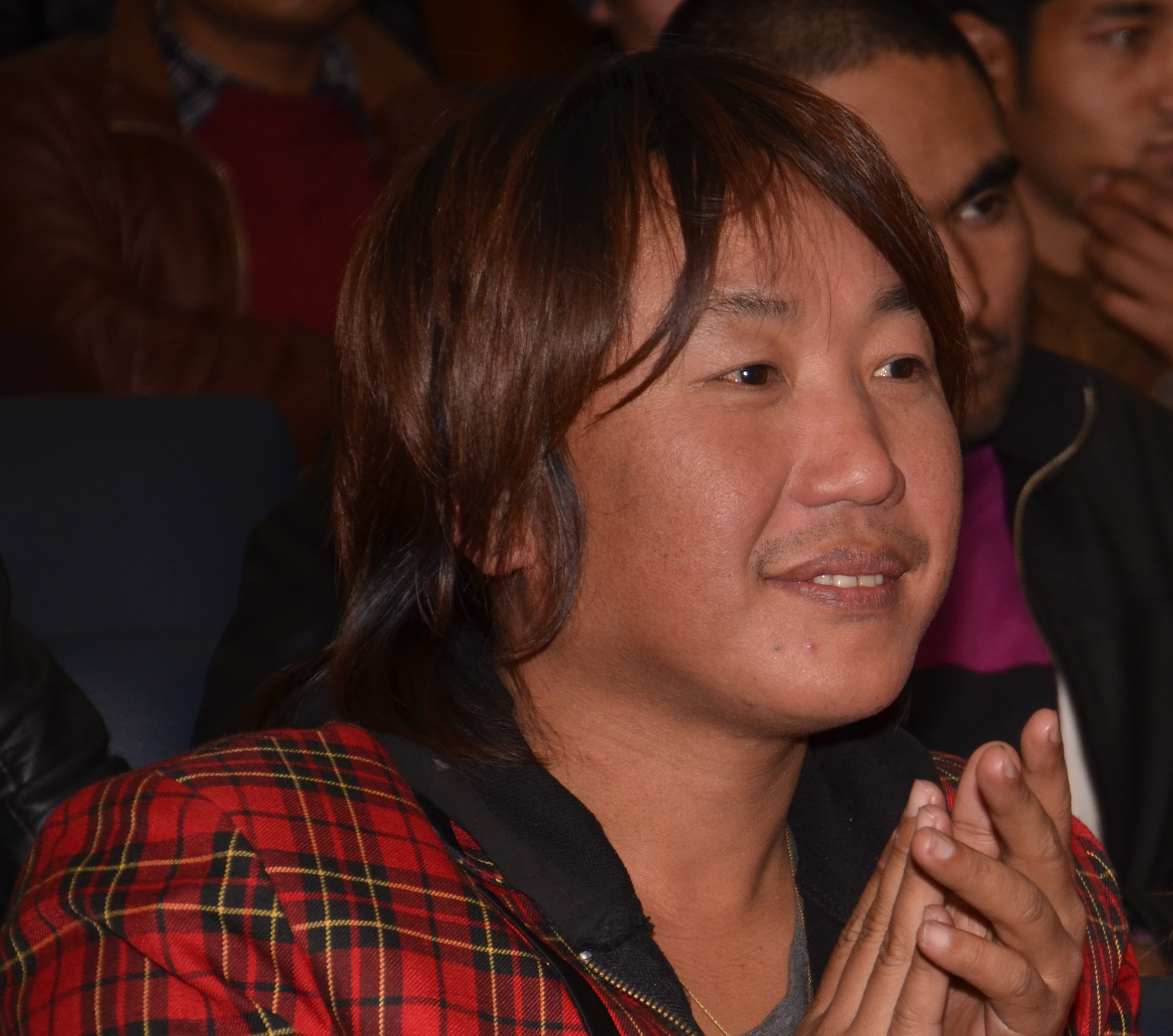
- Rajesh Payal Rai राजेश पायल राई

Background information
- Born: 30 September 1976 (age 49); Khotang District, Nepal
- Genres: Modern Songs, Playback Singer
- Occupations: Singer, actor
- Instrument: Vocals
- Years active: From 1989
- Labels: Darshan Namaste Entertainment Pvt. Ltd., Nepal Cassette, Music Nepal, Master Records, Music Nepal, Moonlight Records, Santana Records, Dhawalagiri Cassette, Ranjana Music Industries, Silver Entertainment

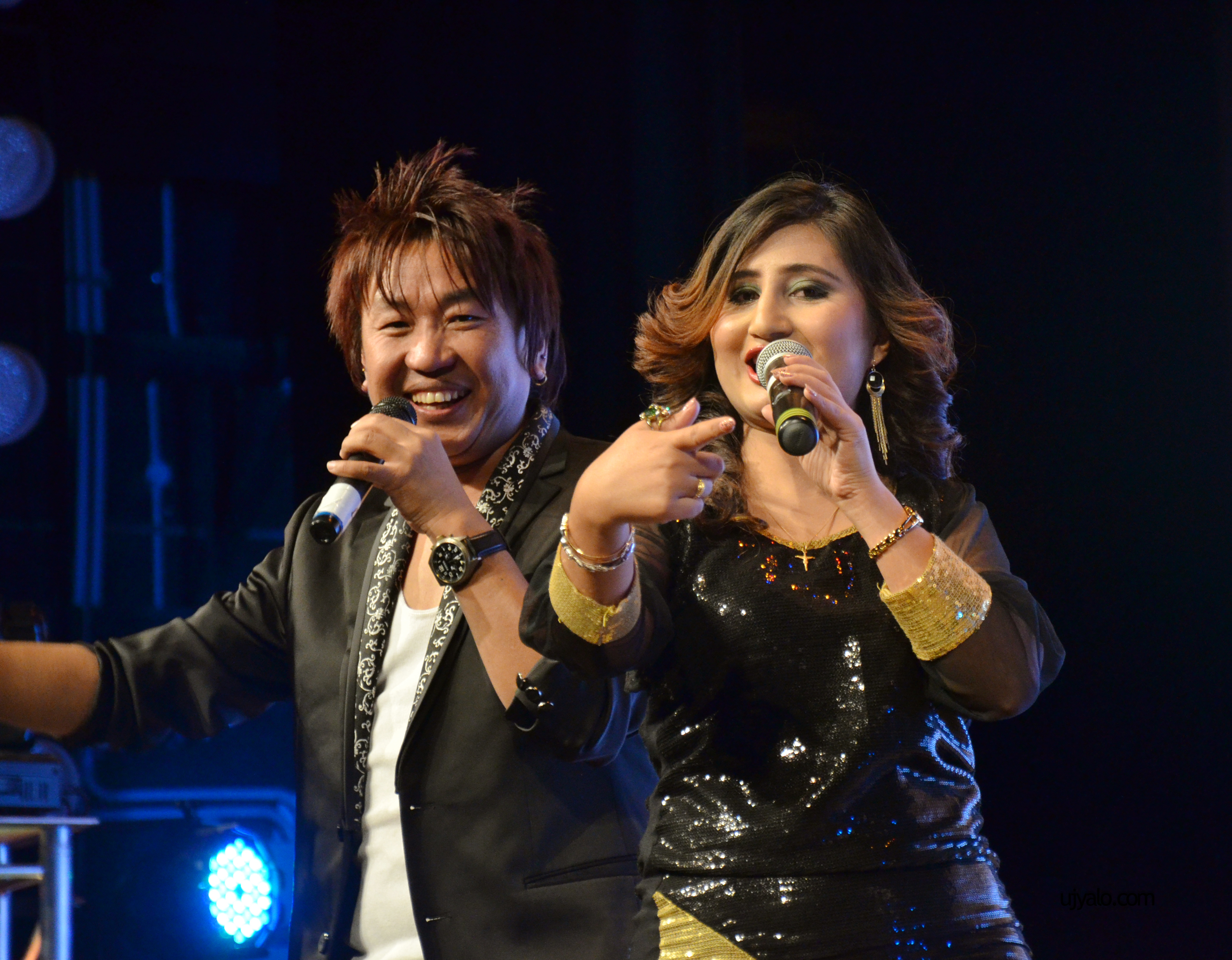
Rajesh Payal Rai and Anju Panta, performing live in Sydney in the event organised by NepaliTouch Australia.

Rajesh Payal Rai (Nepali: राजेश पायल राई; born 30 September 1976) is a Nepalese singer and actor. he is known as a singer in the Nepali music industry. He has done playback singing for more than 250 Nepali movies. In addition, he has recorded several private albums such as Darshan Namaste, Rai is King, Kamana, Jadau, Just For You, Murchana, Baiguni rahechau Mayale, Nigah, Asewaro, Love Letter, Syamuna etc. He has sung Japanese, Assamese and Vojpuri songs as well. He performed on a world wide tour and won several music awards from 1995-2015.He also participated in Melancholy, an environmental song conceptualized, written, composed and directed by Environmentalist Nipesh Dhaka and performed by 365 Nepali artists setting the Guinness World Records.

Rai was assaulted and was put on a MMA style chock hold by an intruder during a New Year Eve's stage performance in The US.

Since 2022, Rai has been a coach on The Voice of Nepal.

== Childhood ==
Rajesh Payal Rai was born in Khotang district of Nepal. His father is Ratna Rai ( former chief of Khotang District, Ex British Gurkha) and his mother is Sancha Laxmi Rai. He has four brothers and one older sister Namita. He grew up in Buipa, Khotang. He changed the date of birth to attend the SLC in 2047 BS. According to document his date of birth is 30 September 1975 AD, however his real date of birth is 30 September 1976 AD.

== Musical career ==
Rai recorded "FAILIYO MAYA DUBO SARI" in 1992, after he came to Kathmandu on completion of his high school. Instantly, he was given opportunities to record new songs and perform live on stage programmes.

He has already sung for five hundred Nepali movies, setting a new record in the history of the Nepali film industry.

Rajesh, who was known as a modern & filmy singer, has also ventured into folk singing with the release of his folk album jadow & jadow-2.

In the course of performing on stage shows, Rajesh has travelled to Hongkong (16 times), South Korea, Australia, Singapore, Malaysia, Japan, U.K., USA, the Gulf countries, and others, to perform for the Nepalese diaspora. He also went on a Nepal tour, singing in all 14 zones.

== List of albums ==
| Title | Year | Label |
|---|---|---|
| Murchana | 1995 | Rima Recording |
| Purwama Ranga Chadecha | 1995 | Nepal Cassette |
| Just For You | 1997 | Music Nepal |
| Love Letter | 1998 | Music Nepal |
| Baiguni Raichow Mayalu | 2000 | Moonlight Records |
| Nigaha | 2001 | Master Records |
| Jadou | 2004 | Santana Records |
| Kamana | 2006 | Dhowlagiri Cassette |
| Jadou 2 | 2008 | SAV |
| Darshan Namaste | 2009 | Ranjana Music Industries |
| Rai Is King | 2011 | Ranjana Music Industries |
| Jadou 3 | 2012 | Ranjana Music Industries |
| Made In Nepal | 2012 | Ranjana Music Industries |
| Murchana 2 | 2012 | Ranjana Music Industries |
| Aasewaro (Limbu Songs) | 2012 | Ranjana Music Industries |
| Darshan Namaste 2 | 2013 | Darshan Namaste Ent./Silver Ent. |
| Darshan Namaste 3 | 2016 | Bindhyawasini music |
| Darshan Namaste 4 | 2019 | Darshan Namaste Entertainment |

== Awards and recognition ==
| Title | Year | Label |
|---|---|---|
| Gold Medal Radio Nepal Modern Song Competition | 1995 | Radio Nepal |
| Best Playback Singer- Film Chunauti | 1997 | Kollywood Cine Award |
| National Vision Busy Award | 1998 | |
| Special Honor By Dharan Municipality at Dharan Festival 2055B.S.(1999A.D.) | 1999 | Dharan Municipality |
| Narayan Gopal Yuba Puraskar | 2005 | Narayan Gopal Sangit Kosh |
| Song Of The Year — Kamana | 2007 | Tuborg Image Award |
| Best Singer Of The Year — Kamana | 2007 | Hits FM Music Award |
| Album Of The Year — Kamana | 2007 | Hits Fm Music Award |
| Best Singer Of The Year | 2007 | Kalika Fm Music Award |
| Best Male Playback Singer | 2007 | Kalika Fm Music Award |
| Best Singer Of The Year | 2008 | Annapurna Fm Music Award |
| Best Folk Song Of The Year(Balla Bhet Bho) - Jadou 2 | 2009 | Tuborg Image Award |
| Popular Song Of The Year - Darshan Namaste | 2009 | Annapurna Fm Music Award |
| Best Singer Of The Year | 2009 | Kantipur FM 96.1 Annual Award |
| Chinnalata Prativa Puraskar | 2010 | Chinnalata Geet Puraskar Guthi |
| Best Singer Of The Year | 2010 | Kantipur FM 96.1 Annual Award |
| Best Singer Of The Year | 2011 | Kantipur FM 96.1 Annual Award |
| Best Pop Singer Of The Year | 2011 | Kalika FM Music Award |
| Album Of The Year - Rai Is King | 2011 | Hits FM Music Award |
| Best Playback Singer of the Year Movies "JHOLE" 2014 | 2014 | TUBORG IMAGE AWARD |
| Best Playback Singer of the Year Movies "JHOLE" 2014 | 2014 | BINDHAWASINI MUSIC AWARD |
| Lux Kamana Critics Award 2016 | 2016 | LUX KAMANA FILM AWARDS |
| Rai is King Day, Every 5 November | 2017 | Rochester, Mayor Lovely Warren, USA |
| Guinness World Records, An Environmental Song by 365 Nepali Artists | 2017 | Melancholy (Participated; As a Rapper) |
| Best Playback Singer (Film: Murchunga ); | 2018 | Music Khabar Award |
| Best Singer -Male; Darshan Namaste-3 | 2018 | Surya International Award;Japan |

|Nati Kaji Yuba Puraskar; |2018

== Videos ==
- https://www.youtube.com/watch?v=50dihJShaqQ
- https://www.youtube.com/watch?v=1025EJ2Fyrg

== Songs ==
- Darshan Namaste
- Namaga Ma Sanga Sahara Namaga
- Rai Is King
- Maya Nisthuri
- Maya Gardainau Re
- Ukali Janu
- Bhetai Ma Bhayo
- Palkiyo Palkiyo
- Timi Sanga
- Sunkoshi ko cheu
- Sarai Beauty
- Timro Muskan
- Sagar Sari Chokho Maya
- Failiyo Maya Dubo Sari
- Timle Bato Fereu Arey
- Maina Raja Maina Rani
- Kyarum
- Ukali Ma Jada Jadai
- Hini Jane Batuwako
- Maile Mayale Diyeko
- Timro Tasbir
- Nisthuri Lai
- Aaja Voli Timile
- Timilai Roje
- Soi Dhole Soi
- Nisthuri Mayale
- Lukera Hereu Mayale
- Timilai Roje
- dui chulthi badne lai
- ma ta marchu ki kya ho thuli
- diktel bazar
- nai nabhannu la 2
- ukali ma jada jadai e mero hajur 2
- mohani lagaune
- bas ma chaina mero mann
- diktel bazar 2
- intu mintu london ma
- sirai ful sirbandi
- timi jasti subasili
- khas ta kehi chaina
- yeta kulo katda kheri
- asato ma satgamay
- setamagurali
- yani maya
- rato galbandi
- aakhako nani vitra
- fulai fulko mausam timilai
- da da da darshan
- Yamano (Japanese)
