= Trishna Gurung =

Nepalese singer

- Born: Rupandehi, Bhairahawa, Nepal
- Education: Master's degree
- Occupations: Composer, singer, lyricist
- Known for: Nepali Pop / Nepali Lok Folk Songs
- Height: 5 ft 4-in

Trishna Gurung (Nepali: तृष्णा गुरुङ) is a Nepalese singer and also former coach of The Voice of Nepal Season 3, a singing reality show. She sang popular numbers including the title song of Maya Pirati, Khani ho yahmu, Gaine Dajaile, and Jali Rumal Mai.

== Music career ==
Trishna Gurung is a Composer, Singer and Lyricist of Nepal Music Industry. Her most popular song is Maya Pirati uploaded on YouTube. She started her music career in 2007 with her first song Daiba Janos in 2007.

== Awards ==
- Hits Fm music award(2018) – BEST FEMALE POP VOCAL PERFORMANCE – Nominated
- Radio Kantipur music award (2018) – Best Pop Singer (Female) – Nominated
