= Abhaya Subba =

Nepalese singer-songwriter and musician

Abhaya Subba Limbu
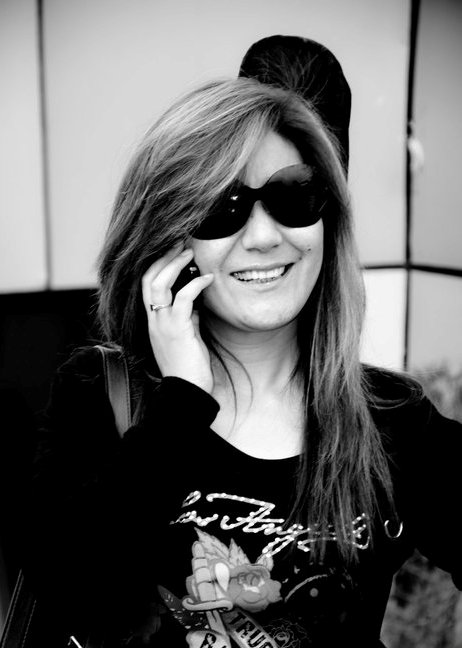
- Abhaya Subba during a local concert in Kathmandu

Background information
- Born: Abhaya Subba (Limbu); 11 June 1979; Darjeeling, West Bengal, India
- Genres: Progressive rock, pop rock, soul, rhythm and blues
- Occupations: Musician, singer-songwriter
- Instruments: Vocals, Keyboard
- Years active: 2003–present
- Labels: 360^{o} Records, Yuva

Abhaya Subba (Limbu) (Nepali: अभाय सुब्बा) is a Nepalese singer-songwriter and musician, best known as the front woman of the rock band Abhaya & the Steam Engines. She is a former RJ of Times FM and Hits FM, and is famous for her progressive music and social initiatives. She is the founder of Women in Concert that gives a platform and creates a safe environment for upcoming female artistes.

== Personal life and career ==
Abhaya completed her LLB studies from St. Xaviers, Mumbai. She worked as RJ in Times FM in Delhi and later with Hits FM in Nepal. She started her music career with a local band Parikrama back in India, and was involved with it from 1993 to 1995. She was also affiliated with other Rock bands, Red Skywalkers and Punchtatva, respectively, before making it big with Abhaya & the Steam Injuns. She claims that her inspiration and the driving force is her father, who got her interested in music since her childhood.

She later collaborated with the Image Channel as a producer and the judge of a local talent program, Sprite Band Challenge—Freedom to Rock Her music is influenced by Led Zeppelin, Blondie, The Clash, Steely Dan and Green Day.

She has a son with her husband, Kai Weise, who is an architect in Nepal.

=== Mainstream success ===
Abhaya claimed the commercial and critical success with her current band, Abhaya & the Steam Injuns. The band was formed on 2 January 2003. Initially they were involved in playing live gigs in hotels and lounge bars. It was essentially an acoustic blues band before it kicked off as a rock outfit. Abhaya Subba, the lead vocalist, is also the founder member and creator of the band.

She was judge in the rock band competition called Sprite Band Challenge—Freedom to Rock, and has judged it along with fellow Nepali musicians Robin Tamang and Dev Rana, where underground rock bands compete for an ultimate prize and a music contract.

=== Concerts & Tours ===
Abhaya has participated in numerous concerts and international tours with her band, and other associated acts. She is also the founder and creator of Women in concert. A concert conceptualized to support rising Nepali female singers and musicians.

=== The Voice of Nepal ===
Abhaya was one of the judges in the first edition of The Voice of Nepal.

== Discography ==
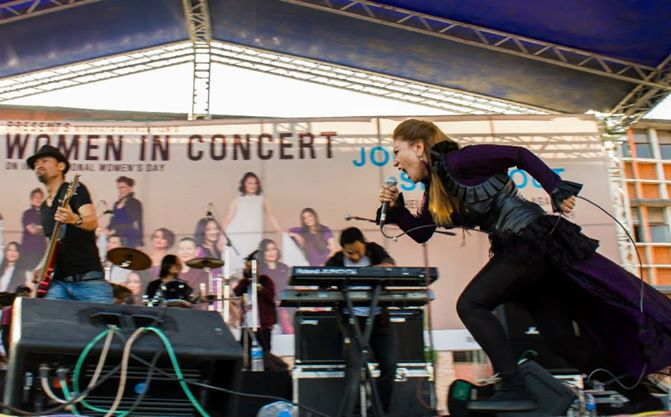
Abhaya and the Steam Injuns Live at Women in Concert

- The Steam Injuns (2005)
- Nayan (2008)

== Other works ==
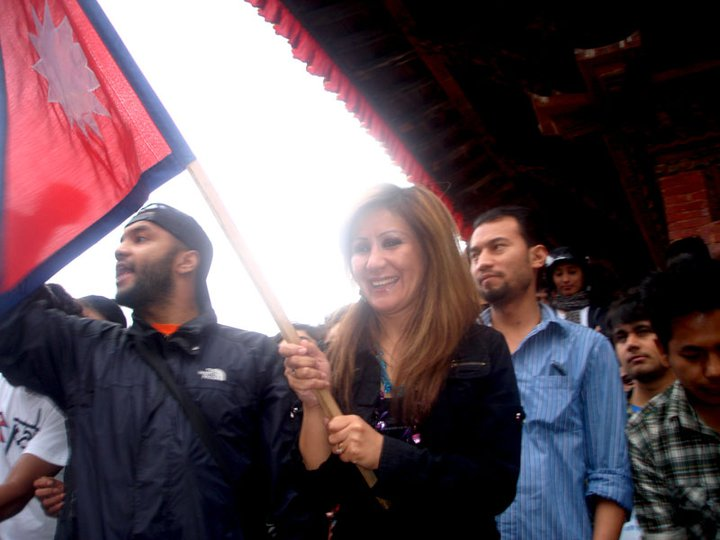
Abhaya during a local protest program, along with activist Shreedeep Rayamajhi

In May 2011, Abhaya participated in Nepal Unites via Facebook, an event organized to warn politicians about the statute drafting within the stipulated time frame, with musicians like Nima Rumba and Aani Tschoing Dolma.

She, along with Lamp Lights, organized Let there be lights, a protest-concert in Kathmandu, in February 2012, to solicit unity against the government's move on increasing load shedding.

In a post-program interview, she responded:

Our leaders made a pledge that power problems are going to improve within five years, but it never happened. So, here we are giving a wakeup call to all CA members to stop the blame game, and start taking actions as we have to bear the brunt of darkness and pain.

== See also ==
- People of Nepal
- Music of Nepal
- Nepalese rock
