= Benisha Poudel =

Nepalese singer

Benisha Poudel बेनिशा पौडेल
- Born: 15 August 2001 (age 24); Jhapa, Nepal
- Origin: Nepal
- Genres: Nepali modern songs .Folk Songs
- Occupation: Singer
- Instruments: Guitar
- Member of: NCPA,

Benisha Poudel (Nepali: बेनिशा पौडेल; born 15 August 2001) is a Nepali singer from Jhapa District. She was a contestant of season 4 of Nepal Idol; since then, she has established herself as one of the leading singers in Nepal. Aakhaima Laune Gazal Sakiyo is the debut song in her singing career. She has since sung over 200 songs, with Hamro Yo Maya, Patuki Bereko, Pardaina Pardaina and Jiwan ko Pana being a number of popular songs in her musical career. She has been also been awarded different awards include Himalayan International and the Music Khabar.

== About ==
she began her career as a child participant in The Voice of Nepal and later gained wider recognition by reaching the Top 7 in Nepal Idol Season 4. Initially active as a dummy playback singer in films, she established herself as a leading vocalist with several successful songs such as Bihe Bhako Chain, Ankhaima Laune Gajal, Phulbutte Choli, and Malai Parai Banaera. Her contributions have earned her multiple honors, including Music Khabar Music Award, OS Nepal Music Award, Birat Music and Film Award, and Radio Kantipur Music Award, solidifying her position as a rising star of contemporary Nepali music.

== Songs ==
=== Movie songs ===
SN	Song name	Movie name	Source
1	Churifuri	Churifuri	
2	K Kachhuwa	Nai Nabhannu La 5	
3	Siyo Dhago	Prem Ganj	
4	Diula Maya	Nai Nabhannu La 6	
5	Bihe Bhako Chhaina	CHhaka Panja 5	
6	Bhangera Bhangeri	Koshe Dhunga	

=== General songs ===
SN	Song name	Genre	Source
1	Hamro Yo Maya	Folk, pop	
2	Patuki Bereko	Folk	
3	Sadhai Yesta Mitha Kura	Folk	
4	Pardaina Pardaina		
5	Akhaima Laune	Pop	
6	Ea Maya Junkiri		
7	Sunai Sun ko Tilahari		
8	Jiwan Ko Pana		
9	Dhyan Karo		
10	Phulbutte Choli		
11	Timi Matra Bhaya		
12	Sandarbha		
13	Man Budho Bhayana		
14	Deusi Bhailo	Tihar Song	
15	Ekohoro Maya	Modern Song	
16	Mira Hu ma Timro	Modern song	
17	Sangai Hasnu Chha	Modern Song	
18	Deusi bhailo Song	Cultural Song	
19	Khulla Aakash	Modern Song	
20	Samandha	Modern Song	
21	Chaine Kere	Teej Song	
22	Manko Tirsana	Modern Song	
23	Timro Sparshale	Modern Song	
24	Maya Ho Maya	Modern song	
25	Anta Nasare	Lok Song	
26	Lahar Jhai	Folk Song	
27	Ma Timro Die Hard Fan	Folk Song	

== Awards ==
SN	Award title	Category	Song	Source
1	3rd Himalayan International award (2023)	Best Female Singer — Modern	Samaya	
2	Music Khabar Music Award (2019)	Best Female Singer — Modern	Akhaima	
3	Birat Music and Film Award (2021)	Best Singer Female Modern	Pardaina Pardaina	
4	NIM Awards (2023)	Best Singer of the Year — Female	Nachhutos	
5	Genius Music Award - (2023)	Best Pop Singer — Female	Yo Najar Ma Najar	
6	Radio Kantipur National Music Award	Best Playback Singer Female	Diula Maya(Movie Song)	
7	bindabasini music award 2024	Jury Award	Ekohoro Maya	
8	National Rapti Music Award	Best Lokpop Singer Female	Hamro Yo Maya	
9	Sagarmatha Music Award - 2026	Best Playback Singer	Bihe Bhako Chhaina	
10	Dcine Award - 2026	Best Playback Singer	Bihe Bhako Chhaina	

== Organization Involvement ==
SN	Organization Name	Role	Ref
1	National Creator and performer Academy (NCPA)	Women Secretary	
2	Performer Society Nepal	Member	
