= Melina Rai =

Nepalese singer (born 1993)

Melina Rai मेलिना राई
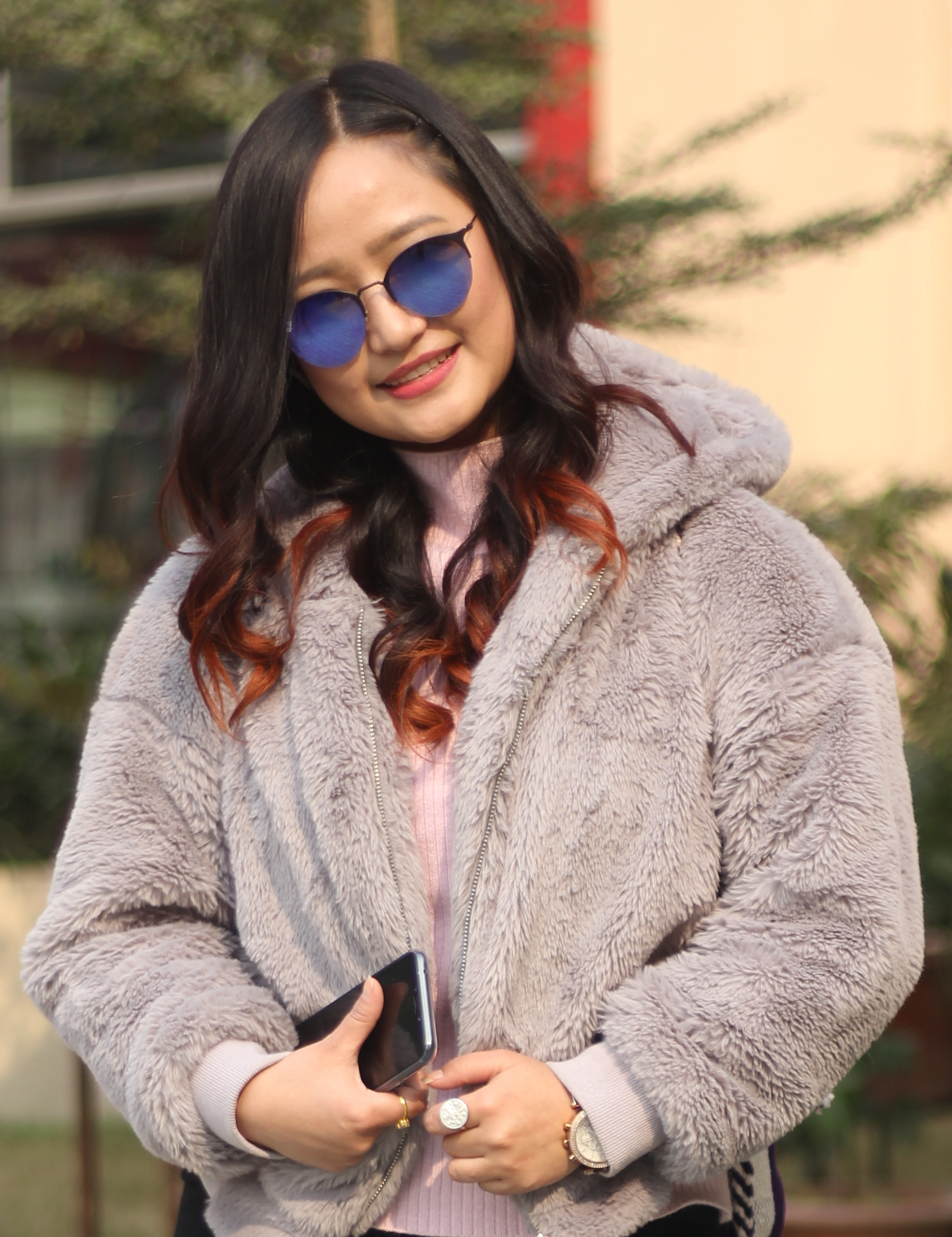

Background information
- Born: 7 December 1993 (age 32); Morang District, Nepal
- Occupations: Singer
- Years active: 2015–present
- Partner: Dhruba Gurung (2025)
- Awards: Radio Kantipur Awards 2017

Melina Rai (Nepali: मेलिना राई; born 7 December 1993) is a Nepalese singer and television personality. Originally from Morang, Nepal, Melina Rai has become one of the region's most prominent pop artists. In addition to her music career, Rai is a coach on the reality television shows The Voice of Nepal and The Voice Kids Nepal, becoming the first female coach to win the latter program in 2025.

Her notable songs include, "Timle Bato Fereu Arey", "Shiraima Shirbandi", "Chapakkai Ful Fulyo", "Kutu ma Kutu" and "Machhile Khane Kholiko Leu".

== Early life and career ==
Trained by her father in music from age 10, she recorded her first song at age 12.

In 2015, she released her debut song "Kammar Mathi Patuki".

She received the Best Female Playback Singer award at the National Music Awards, presented by Radio Kantipur, in 2017.

In September 2018, Rai released her song "Kati Ma Samjhu".

== Collaborations and wider audience reach ==
Throughout her musical career, Melina Rai has collaborated with several notable artists, including Rajina Rimal, Nepathya, and Sanjeev Singh.

The music video for the song 'Aauna Maya', featuring the vocals of popular singers Melina Rai and Suman Rai, with lyrics and composition by Hari Lamsal) portrays a deeply emotional story of love, longing, and separation. The video featured by star Dayahang Rai.

== Personal life ==
In April 2022, Melina Rai revealed her engagement to Sanjiv Baraili, a fellow artist from the Nepali Music Industry. The couple broke off the engagement later in the year. As of 2025, she is married to Dhruba Gurung.

== Awards and nominations ==
Award	Year	Nominee(s) / Work(s)	Category	Result	Ref.
Yamaha Kalika FM Music Award	2016	Herself		Won	
National Music Awards	2017	Herself	Best Female Playback Singer	Won	
