= Machhapuchchhre Rural Municipality =

Machhapuchchhre माछापुछ्रे
- Gaunpalika
- Location in Nepal Machhapuchchhre (Nepal)
- Coordinates: 28.47°N 84.00°E
- Country: Nepal
- Province: Gandaki
- District: Kaski District

Area
  - Total: 545.52 km^{2} (210.63 sq mi)

Population
  - Total: 22,898
  - Density: 41.975/km^{2} (108.71/sq mi)
- Time zone: UTC+5:45 (Nepal Time)
- Website: machhapuchhremun.gov.np

Machhapuchchhre is a Gaunpalika and former village development committee in Kaski District in the Gandaki Province of northern-central Nepal. At the time of the 1991 Nepal census it had a population of 1,881 persons living in 378 individual households.

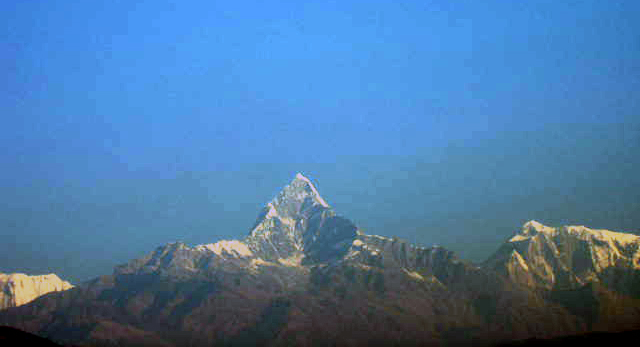
Machhapuchchhre Mountain in Nepal

== Demographics ==
At the time of the 2011 Nepal census, Machhapuchchhre Rural Municipality had a population of 21,920. Of these, 82.0% spoke Nepali, 12.4% Gurung, 4.5% Tamang, 0.5% Magar, 0.4% Newar, 0.1% Rai and 0.3% other languages as their first language.

In terms of ethnicity/caste, 30.2% were Hill Brahmin, 14.7% Gurung, 12.5% Kami, 8.0% Magar, 7.7% Chhetri, 7.3% Sarki, 6.5% Tamang, 5.9% Damai/Dholi, 2.2% other Dalit, 1.3% Thakuri, 1.1% Newar, 0.9% Gharti/Bhujel, 0.5% Sanyasi/Dasnami, 0.2% Badi, 0.2% Rai, 0.1% Musalman, 0.1% Tharu and 0.3% others.

In terms of religion, 83.9% were Hindu, 14.1% Buddhist, 1.1% Christian, 0.3% Bon, 0.1% Kirati, 0.1% Muslim and 0.4% others.

In terms of literacy, 69.7% could both read and write, 2.3% could read but not write and 28.0% could neither read nor write.

According to 2021 Nepal Census, it had a population of 22,898 (Twenty two thousands eight hundred ninety eight).
