= Pramod Kharel =

Nepalese singer

Pramod Kharel प्रमोद खरेल
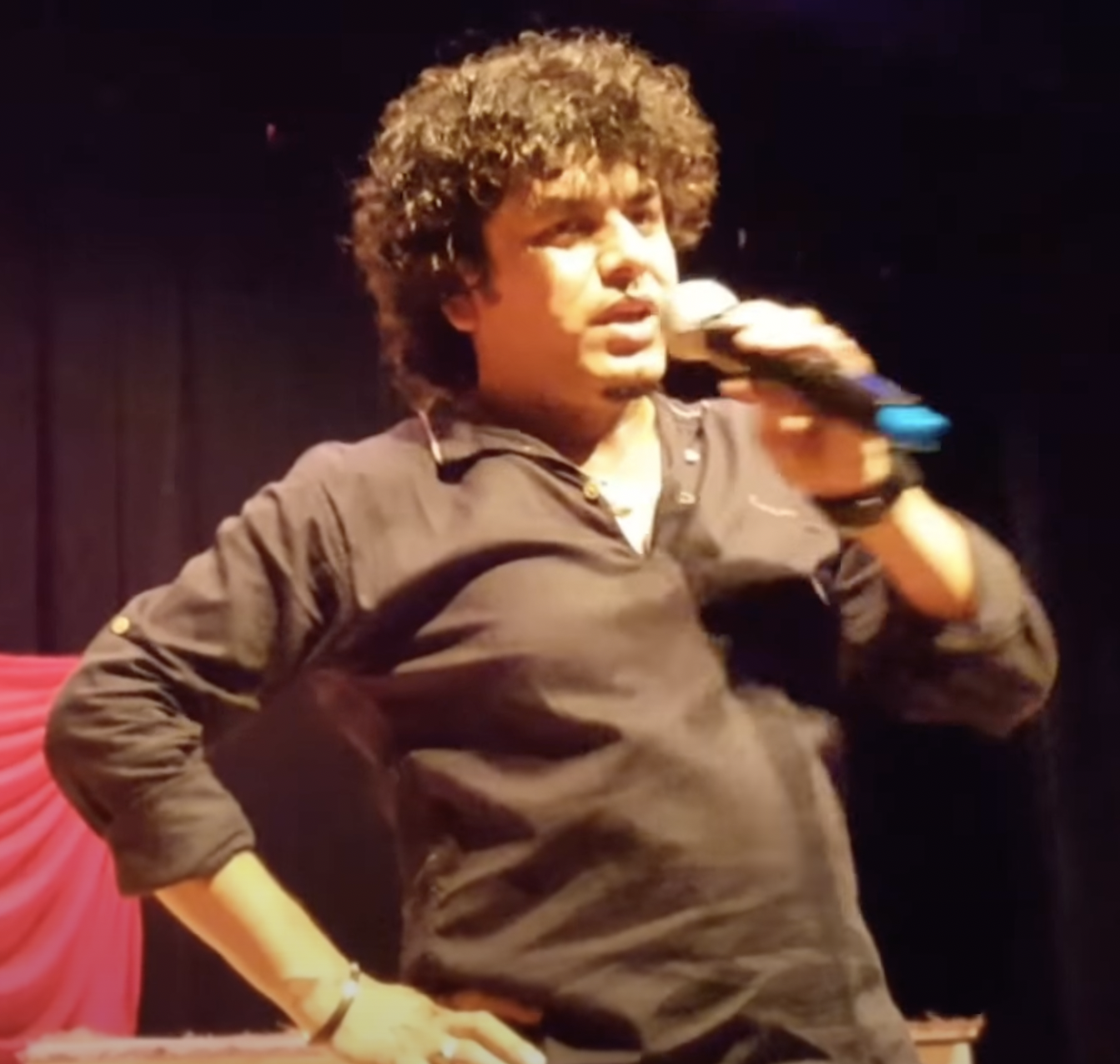
- Kharel singing in the US during Dashai Tihar Mela concert

Background information
- Born: 6 November 1979 (age 46); Goruduba, Sonitpur, Assam
- Genres: Modern Songs, Film Songs
- Occupation: Singer
- Years active: 1999–present

Pramod Kharel (Nepali: प्रमोद खरेल; born 6 November 1979) is a Nepalese singer. He is a versatile singer of the Nepali music industry. He has recorded more than 2000 songs of different genres. He became coach in The Voice of Nepal for seasons 1 (2018), 2 (2019), 3 (2020–2021),4 (2022) and 5 (2023).He is also a coach in The Voice kids Nepal for seasons 1,2 and 3 .

== Personal life ==
Kharel obtained his master's degree in chemistry from Tribhuvan University in 2003. He also worked as a lecturer at Xavier International H.S.S. & College, Pyramid College and White Gold College.

== Discography ==
- Prapti
- Pranaya
- Prabeg

== Awards and nominations ==
- Chhinalata singer of the year 2010
- Annapurna ghazal singer of the year 2010
- Annapurna singer of the year 2011
- Kalika best singer 2012
- Kalika best song of the year 2009
- Winning coach of Voice of Nepal Season 2 and Season 3
- Winning coach of Voice of Kids Nepal Season 1 and Season 2
- Album of the year (Pranaya) 2010
- Kalika best ghazal (Khai Jaal Ma) 2010
- Radio Nepal Top Ten Singer Award in 2003
- Won Hits FM Music Award: Best male vocal performance
- Won Sagarmatha Music Awards: Best modern singer
- Nominated Kalika Music Award: Best pop singer
- Won Bindabashini Music Award: Best male pop singer
