= Roshani Rasaili =

Nepalese singer (born 1984)

Roshani Rasaili रोशनी रसाइली (Nepali)
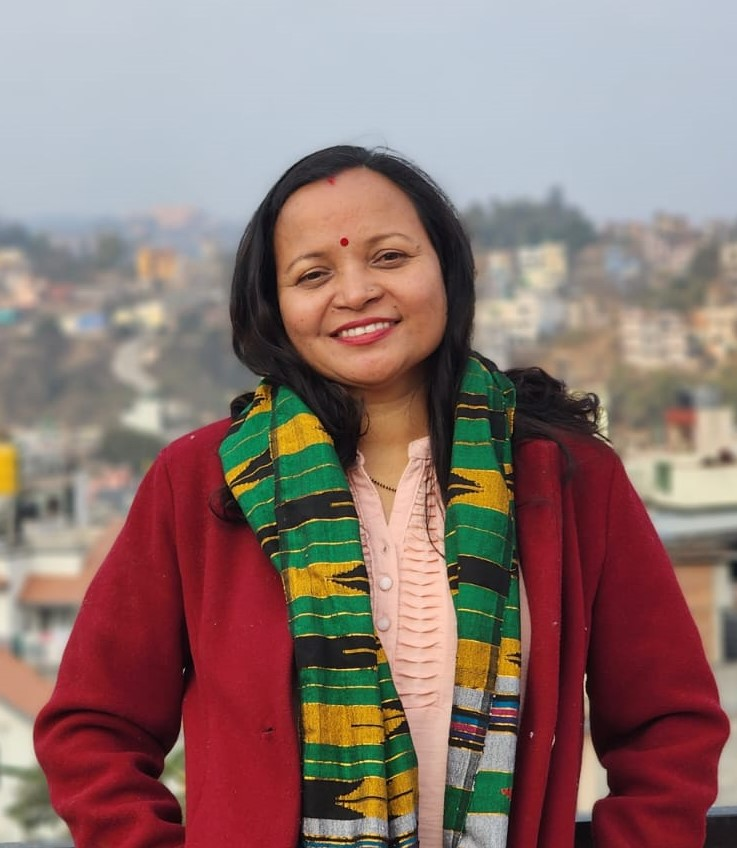

Background information
- Born: November 1984 (age 41); Baglung, Nepal
- Genres: Folk
- Occupation: singer
- Years active: 2009 - present
- Member of: National Folk and duet song Academy Nepal, Association of Music Industries Nepal
- Spouse: Ramesh Shivashankar
- Website: roshanirasaili.com.np

Roshani Rasaili (Nepali: रोशनी रसाइली) is a Nepalese folk and duet singer of Nepal. She is known for her contributions to the Nepali music industry. She was born in 1984 in Baglung District of Nepal. Rasaili started her musical career in 2009 with the release of her debut song, "Kati Palayo Dali" and her first album, Mutu bijhaune. With a musical career spanning 14 years. she has become a prominent figure in both duet and folk singing.

== Awards ==
Rasaili was awarded the Best Women Leadership Excellence Award in Music & Entertainment Industry Category on 10 December 2021 (South Asian Partnership Summit & Business Excellence Awards, Colombo, Sri Lanka) and Best Duet and Folk Singer at the Star Music and Film Awards in 2021.

== Early life ==
Rasaili married Ramesh Shivashankar after meeting in Kathmandu in 2010. Their wedding ceremony was held in Nepal on 24 November 2011.

== Album ==
Album name	Release date	ref
Mutu bijhaune	2009	
Murchhapari Chheuma Dhalda ni	2011	
Sanai Chha Ummera	2011	
Facebook Song	2019	
33 kilo Sun	2018	
Garchhu Maya Garchhu	2021	

== Songs ==
Song name	Release date	ref
"33 kilo sun"	12 Aug 2018	
"Bhatti Pasal"	13 Sep 2018	
"Sali Bhena"	11 Dec 2019	
"Chautari Ma Bar Chhha"	9 Aug 2017	
"Melamchi Aauchha"	9 May 2018	
"Dada Ghare Kanchhi"	2 Aug 2015	
"Yespali Teej Ma Selfie Khichinchha"	21 Aug 2015	
"Euta Photo Khichi Deuna"	26 Jul 2016	
"Herna Jauna filim"	6 Sep 2016	
"Sanai Chha Umera"	2011	
"Tehiketi Man Paryo"	8 April 2018	
"Garchhu Maya Garchhu"	7 Aug 2021	
"Mai Ramri Chhu Re"	15 Oct 2015	
"Kavre ma Ghar chha - part 1"	3 Dec 2014	
"Kavre ma Ghar chha - part 2"	24 Nov 2021	

== Awards and nomination ==
Award title	Category	Song name	Result	Ref
South Asian Partnership Summit & Business Excellence Award (international award from srilanka)	Best Women Leadership Excellence Award in Music & Entertainment Industry Category		won	
8th chhayachhabi Teej Musc Award-2021	Best Teej Song Singer	Garchhu maya garchhu	won	
National creative citizen award 2023	Best Folk Duet Singer		won	
Star music and film awards 2021	Best Duet and Folk Singer	Sali Bhina	won	
Sagarmatha Music Award 2023	Best Folk-pop Singer	Furfur Putali	won	

== Jury ==
Name	Ref
6th Samabesi Music Awards	
3rd Genius Music Award	
2nd - Rara National Music Award	

== Honor ==
Honor title	Date	ref
Guinness World Record	2018	
Association of Music Industries Nepal - (Honorary Member)	2023	
3rd Spiny Babbler International film Festival - 2023	2023	
Nepal Film Director Association	2023	
Rara National Music Award - 2024	2024	
Third National Bishal Lumbini Award - 2024	2024	
