= Nischal Basnet filmography =

Nischal Basnet's film credits

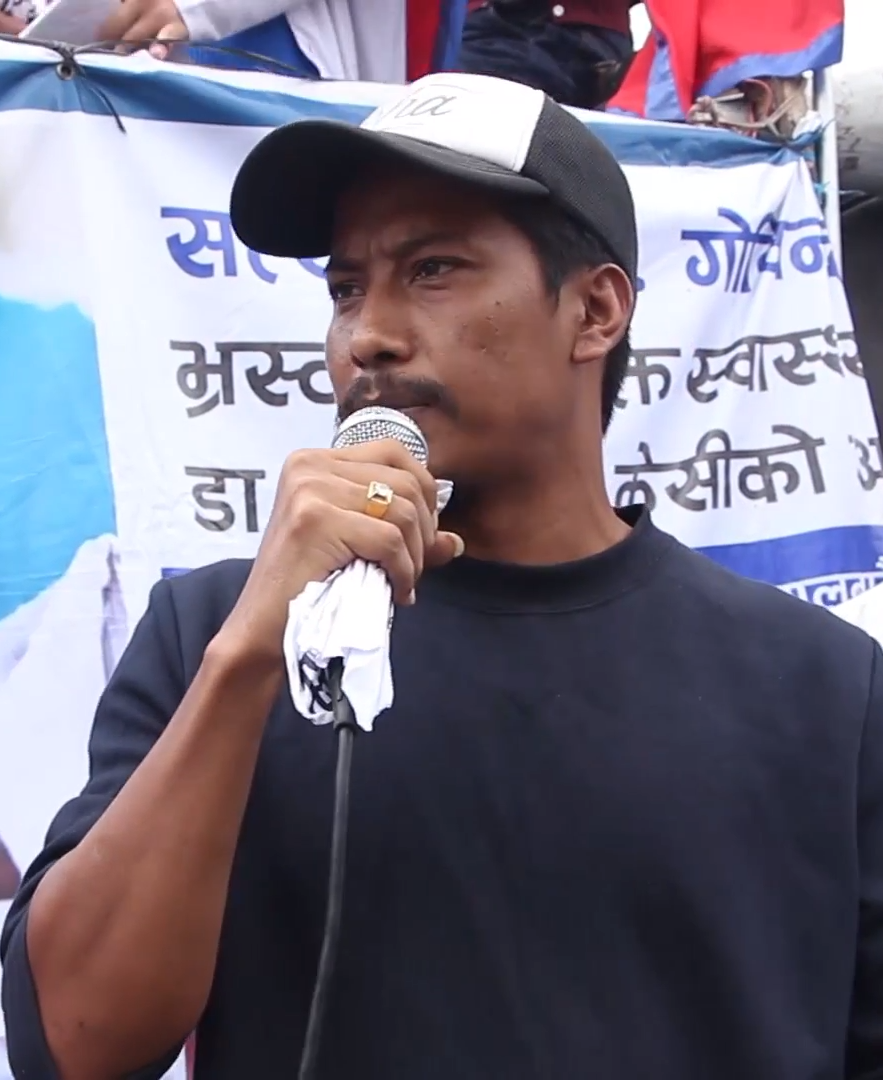
Nischal Basnet at a news conference supporting the hunger strike of Govinda K.C.

Nischal Basnet is a Nepalese film director and actor who primarily appears in Nepali language films. He made his directorial debut in 2012 with the crime-thriller Loot and wrote screenplay for the film. The film focuses on Hakku Kale (played by Saugat Malla), who masterminds a bank robbery. The film received mixed reviews from the critics, some of whom criticized the script for not being original. According to The Kathmandu Post, the film "changed the discourse of the Nepali film industry". Loot earned 25.5 million Nepalese rupees (approximately US$218,000 in 2019), making it Nepal's highest-grossing film of 2012. Basnet went on to win the Dcine Award for Best Debut Director. In 2014, Basnet acted in and produced Ram Babu Gurung's romantic drama Kabaddi. In the film, Basnet plays Bibek, who tries to abduct a gangster's daughter. The same year, Basnet directed the dark comedy Talakjung vs Tulke. The film is set during the Nepalese Civil War, which lasted from 1996 to 2006. Basnet won the Film Critics Society of Nepal Award for Best Director and the National Film Award for Best Director. Talakjung vs Tulke was selected as the Nepalese entry for the Best Foreign Language Film at the 88th Academy Awards, but it was not nominated.

In 2017, Basnet directed Loot 2, the sequel to Loot. Loot 2 grossed 60.1 million Nepalese rupees (approximately US$524,000 in 2019) at the box office, surpassing the lifetime box office gross of Loot. After directing Loot 2, Basnet starred in Dui Rupaiyan (2017), portraying Jureli, one of two characters on a quest to find two rupees. In 2018, Basnet appeared in Dinesh Raut's Prasad, playing the role of Ramesh alongside actors Bipin Karki and Namrata Shrestha. For his role in the film, Basnet was nominated for a Dcine Award and the Kamana Film Award for Best Actor in a Negative Role. (Note: Dcine Award has 15 categories and Kamana Film Award has 27 categories. Both awards are given guest actors, and are awarded yearly.) Besides acting and directing, Basnet has served as a judge on Sarwanam Theater (2018), Nepal Idol (2019) and Nepal's Mega Cinestar (2019). He has also sung "Udhreko Choli", "Hit Geet", and "Ghyampe".

== Films ==
Key
| † | Denotes films that have not yet been released |

| Year | Title | Credited as | | Role(s) | Film director | Note(s) | Ref. |
| Year | Title | Director | Actor | Role(s) | Film director | Note(s) | Ref. |
|---|---|---|---|---|---|---|---|
| 2012 | Loot | Yes | No | — | Nischal Basnet | | |
| 2013 | Uma | No | Yes | Bhuwan | Tsering Rhitar Sherpa | | |
| 2014 | Fitkiree | No | Yes | Baburam | Anup Baral | | |
| 2014 | Kabaddi | No | Yes | Bibek | Ram Babu Gurung | Also a producer | |
| 2014 | Talakjung vs Tulke | Yes | Yes | Police officer | Nischal Basnet | Nepalese entry for the Best Foreign Language Film | |
| 2015 | Kabaddi Kabaddi | No | Yes | Bibek | Ram Babu Gurung | | |
| 2015 | Zindagi Rocks | No | Yes | Nischal, fiancé of Maya | Nikesh Khadka | Special appearance | |
| 2017 | Loot 2 | Yes | No | Dancer | Nischal Basnet | Special appearance | |
| 2017 | Dui Rupaiyan | No | Yes | Jureli | Asim Shah | | |
| 2018 | Changa Chet | No | Yes | — | Dipendra K Khanal | Special appearance | |
| 2018 | Prasad | No | Yes | Ramesh | Dinesh Raut | | |
| 2019 | Garud Puran | No | Yes | Singer | Subash Koirala | Special appearance | |
| 2019 | Ghamad Shere | No | Yes | Shere | Hemraj B.C. | | |
| 2019 | Jatrai Jatra | No | Yes | Himself | Pradip Bhattarai | Special appearance | |
| 2023 | Dimag Kharab | Yes | No | | Nischal Basnet | | |
| 2024 | Behuli From Meghauli | No | Yes | | Sajan Kafle, Akash Baral | Producer | |
| 2025 | Ke Ghar Ke Deraa: Ghar No. 2 | No | Yes | | Dipendra K. Khanal | | |
| 2025 | Mahabhoj | No | No | | | Playback singer | |
| TBA | Damadol † | No | Yes | TBA | Asim Shah | Announced | |

=== Television ===
| Title | Year | Role(s) | Note(s) | Ref |
|---|---|---|---|---|
| Sarwanam Theater | 2018 | Judge | | |
| Nepal Idol | 2018 | Guest Judge | Appeared alongside Dinesh Raut and Namrata Shrestha | |
| Nepal's Mega Cinestar | 2019 | Judge | | |
| Himalaya Roadies | 2022 | Guest judge | | |

=== Music videos ===
| Title | Year | Credited as | | Singer(s) | Film | Note(s) | Ref. |
| Title | Year | Singer | Actor | Singer(s) | Film | Note(s) | Ref. |
|---|---|---|---|---|---|---|---|
| "Udhreko Choli" | 2012 | Yes | No | Indira Joshi, Nischal Basnet | Loot | | |
| "Hit Geet" | 2015 | Yes | No | Nischal Basnet | Kabaddi Kabaddi | | |
| "Kutu Ma Kutu" | 2017 | No | Yes | Rajan Raj Shiwakoti, Melina Rai, Rajan Ishan | Dui Rupaiyan | Features Swastima Khadka, Asif Shah and Basnet | |
| "Kale Dai" | 2017 | Yes | Yes | Nishcal Basnet, Meena Niraula | Parva | | |
| "Ghyampe" | 2017 | Yes | No | Hercules Basnet ft. Nischal Basnet | Loot 2 | | |
| "Poko Parera" | 2017 | Yes | Yes | Nischal Basnet | Lappan Chhappan | | |
| "Nacha Firiri" | 2018 | No | Yes | Mahesh Kafle | — | Features Swastima Khadka and Basnet | |
| "Ma Ta Pirim Ma" | 2018 | No | Yes | Koshish Chhetri, Manisha Pokhrel | Garud Puran | | |
| "Maya Pirim" | 2019 | No | Yes | Nishan Bhattarai, Manisha Pokhrel | Jatrai Jatra | Features Karishma Manandhar and Basnet | |
| "Sali Mann Paryo" | 2019 | No | Yes | Kali Prasad Baskota, Ashmita Adhikari | Ghamad Shere | Features Swastima Khadka and Basnet | |
