= Binita Kathayat =

Nepalese politician

Honourable Binita Kathayat
- बिनिता कठायत

Member of Parliament, Pratinidhi Sabha
- Incumbent
- Assumed office 22 December 2022
- President: Bidya Devi Bhandari
- Constituency: Party List

Personal details
- Born: Jumla District, Karnali Province, Nepal
- Party: Rastriya Swatantra Party
- Parents: Amrit Singh Kathayat (father); Kali Kathayat (mother)

Binita Kathayat is a Nepalese media figure and politician, belonging to the Rastriya Swatantra Party. She is currently serving as a member of the 2nd Federal Parliament of Nepal. In the 2022 Nepalese general election she was elected as a proportional representative for Khas Arya cluster from rural area. Before being elected to the Federal Parliament of Nepal, she worked at Galaxy 4K Television.

== Early life and education ==
Kathayat was born in 2052 BS (1995–1996) in Khalanga Bazar in Chandannath municipality of Jumla District of Karnali Province in Nepal. She belongs to a political family. Her grandfather Narayan Singh Kathayat was a local development officer.

She studied at Seto Bangla School in Kathmandu till ninth grade. She received her tenth grade School Leaving Certificate from a school in Jumla. Under an Indian government scholarship, she studied Political Science in her plus–two level from Dehradun in India. She then received a Diploma in Film Making from Zee Institute of Media Arts in Mumbai.

== Career in Media ==
After completing her diploma, she returned to Nepal to work in the film industry. She worked an assistant director for the movies Loot 2 and Hostel Returns. She also worked as a costume stylist for Chapali Height 2 and Chiso Manchhe.

She also worked as a costume stylist for various television programmes. She produced the television programme Parkhal Bahirako Nepal for Galaxy 4K TV.

== Political career ==
In 2022 Nepalese general election, her colleague Rabi Lamichhane from Galaxy 4K TV formed a new political party, Rastriya Swatantra Party. RSP invited her to be a representative candidate for Khas Arya cluster from rural area. In the election RSP became the fourth largest party and she was elected to the 2nd Federal Parliament of Nepal.

== Filmography ==
=== Film ===
Title of the film	Director	Role
Loot 2	Nischal Basnet	Assistant Director
Hostel Returns	Suraj Bhusal	Assistant Director
Chapali Height 2	Dipendra K Khanal	Costume Stylist
Chiso Manchhe	Dipendra K. Khanal	Costume Stylist

=== Television ===
Title of the show	Channel	Role
Parkhal Bahirako Nepal	Galaxy 4K TV	Costume Stylist
