= Shailesh Shrestha =

Nepalese film composer and musician

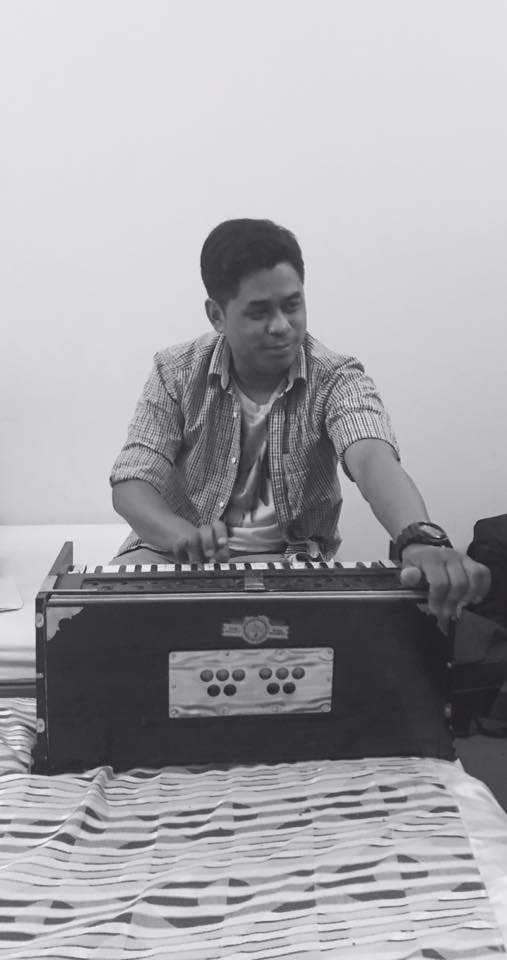
- Born: September 20, 1989 (age 36)
- Occupations: Composer, record producer
- Years active: 2006-present

Shailesh Shrestha is a Nepalese composer and record producer, known for his work in Nepalese films. Shailesh began his career as a jingle composer, primarily focusing on non-film materials such as albums. He made his debut as a film composer with "Aawaran," and his work gained recognition, particularly for his contributions to "Nepalese Dreams" and "Gajalu," leading to him receiving multiple awards, including the Kamana Film Awards, Dcine Awards and the National Box Office Film Award in 2016 and 2017 respectively.

== Filmography, awards and nominations ==
Year	Title	Director	Language	Notes	Credit
2021	Prakash	Dinesh Raut	Nepali		Background score
2020	Selfie King	Bishal Sapkota	Nepali		Background score
2020	Love Diaries	Saurav Chaudhary	Nepali		Background score
2019	12 SATTAIS	Zohn Yonzon	Nepali		Background score
2019	Ghamad Shere	Hemraj bc	Nepali		Background score
2019	Maruni	Nawal Nepal	Nepali		Background score
2019	A Mero Hajur 3	Jharana Thapa	Nepali	Nominated for Kamana Film Awards 2076 (Best Background Score)	Background score
2019	Jatrai Jatra	Pradip Bhattarai	Nepali		Background score
2019	The Break Up (2019 film)	Hemraj bc	Nepali		Background score
2019	Captain (2019 film)	Diwakar Bhattarai	Nepali		Background score
2019	Na Yeta Na Uta	Miraz Roshan And Bisharad Basnet	Nepali		Background score
2019	Ranveer	Govind Singh Bhandari	Nepali		Background score
2018	Prasad (2018 film)	Dinesh Raut	Nepali	Nominated in Dcine Awards 2076 (Best Background Score)	Background score
2018	Jai Shree Daam	Biplop Upreti	Nepali		Background score
2018	Katha Kathmandu	Sangita Shrestha	Nepali		Background score
2018	Bandha Mayale	Shabir Shrestha	Nepali		Background score
2018	Ramkahani	Sudarshan Thapa	Nepali		Background score
2018	Romeo & Muna	Naresh Kumar Kc	Nepali		Background score
2018	Kohalpur Express	Bishal Bhandari	Nepali		Background score
2018	Kri (film)	Surendra Poudel	Nepali	Nominated in Dcine Awards 2075 and Kamana Film Awards 2075	Background score
2017	Gangster Blues	Hemraj bc	Nepali		Background score
2017	Dhanapati	Dipendra K. Khanal	Nepali		Background score
2017	Naakaa	Amit Shrestha	Nepali		Background score
2017	Loot 2	Nischal Basnet	Nepali	Nominated in Kamana Film Awards 2074	Background score
2017	Ghampani	Dipendra Lama	Nepali		Background score
2017	Aishwarya	Diwakar Bhattrai	Nepali		Background score
2017	A Mero Hajur 2	Jharana Thapa	Nepali	Nominated in Kamana Film Awards 2075	Background score
2017	Love Love Love (2017 film)	Dipendra K. Khanal	Nepali		Background score
2017	Dui Rupaiyan	Asim Shah	Nepali	Nominated in Dcine Awards 2075	Background score
2017	Safar (2016 film)	Ashish Shrestha	Nepali		Background score
2016	Gajalu	Hemraj bc	Nepali	Won Dcine Awards 2074 and Box Office Film Award 2017 (Best Background Score)	Background score
2016	Dreams (2016 film)	Diwakar Bhattarai	Nepali	Won Kamana Film Awards 2073 (Best Background Score)	Background score
2016	Jatra (2016 film)	Pradip Bhattarai	Nepali	Nominated in NFDC National Film Awards 2073 (Best Background Score)	Background score
2016	Classic (2016 film)	Dinesh Raut	Nepali	Nominated in LG Film Awards 2073 and 9th NEFTA Film Awards 2016 (Best Background Score)	Background score
2016	King	Shabir Shrestha	Nepali	Nominated in NFDC National Film Awards 2073 (Best Background Score)	Background score
2016	How Funny	Nilu Doma Sherpa	Nepali		Background score
2016	Karkhana	Amardeep Sapkota	Nepali		Background score
2016	Ko Aafno	Anil Thapa	Nepali		Background score
2015	Chankhe Shankhe Pankhe	Sudarshan Thapa	Nepali		Background score
2015	Sambodhan	Hemraj bc	Nepali		Background score
2015	Hostel Returns	Suraj Bhusal	Nepali	Nominated in 9th NEFTA Film Awards 2016 (Best Background Score)	Background score
2015	Aavash	Surendra Poudel	Nepali		Background score
2014	Punte Parade	Subash Koirala	Nepali		Background score
2014	Utsav	Kumar Bhattarai	Nepali	Nominated in NEFTA Film Awards 2015 (Best Background Score)	Background score
2014	Jerryy	Hemraj bc	Nepali		Background score
2013	Maun	Suraj Bhushal	Nepali		Background score
2013	Aawaran	Subash Koirala	Nepali		Background score
