= National Film Awards (Nepal) =

Nepalese film award

The National Film Awards is the most prominent and prestigious award of Nepali cinema. The first National Film Award was held in 2005, in the presence of His Majesty's King Gyanendra Bir Bikram Shah. The event is held at the residence of the president of Nepal and the president (as a Head of Nation) gives the awards to the winners in various categories. It is yearly organised by Film Development Board, Nepal (government organisation, which looks after film industry of Nepal).

== National Film Awards 2005 (2062 BS) ==
The Film Development Board of Nepal organized the National Film Awards 2005 at Birendra International Convention Center, Kathmandu, Nepal. The award's nomination was declared in the presence of Her Majesty Queen Komal Rajya Laxmi Devi Shah.

Winners of the awards:

- Best National Language Film: Kab Hoi Milanwa Hamaar
- Best Story: Naru Thapa for Bandhaki
- Best Script: Prithvi Rana for Pareni Maya Jaalai Ma
- Best Dailog: Yugesh Rayamaji for Bandhaki
- Best Child Artist Sushmita Regmi for Pahuna
- Best Re-Recording: Mukesh Shah for Bandhaki
- Best Editor: Banish Shah for Bandhaki
- Best Dance Director: A. Kamal Rai for Bandhaki and B. Birendra Hamal for Agnipath
- Best Vocal Female: Sapana Shree for Dharmatmaa
- Best Vocal Male: Prakash Shrestha for Bacha Bandhan (Song Title: Jaba Maile...)
- Best Lyricist: Suresh Adhikari for Muglan
- Best Art Direction: Nirjal Shrestha for Bir GaneshMan
- Best Fight Direction: N.B. Maharjan for Bandhaki
- Best Debut Actress: Gita Shahi for Bandhaki
- Best Debut Actor: Bhupendra Chand for Dui Kinara
- Best Music Director: Suresh Adhikari for Bandhaki
- Best Cinematographer: Dirgha Bir Gurung for Jeevan Rekha
- Best Supporting Actor (Female): Mithila Sharma for Karmayodhha
- Best Supporting Actor (Male): Mukunda Shrestha for Kartavya
- Best Comedy Actor: Kiran KC for Meri Aama
- Best Actor in Negative Role: Dilip Rayamajhi for Baaji
- Best Actress : Jal Shah for Yastai Rahecha Zindagi
- Best Actor: Nikhil Uprety for Hami Teen Bhai
- Best Director: Kishor Rana Magar for Bandhaki
- Best Film : Bandhaki for Radhe Krishna Films Pvt. Ltd. (Daktar SIngh Gurung)
- Critics Award: Mala Sinha for Maitighar
- Film Excellence Honor of Nepal for Dev Anand, Indian Actor, Director

The films and winners were selected from the films released in the year 2004 (2061 BS).

== National Film Awards 2006 (2063 BS) ==
The Film Development Board of Nepal organized the National Film Awards 2006 in Rastriya Nach Ghar, Kantipath, Kathmandu. on 16th Asadh 2067, on the occasion of Anniversary Day of Film Development Board, Nepal.

Winners of the awards:

- Best Cinematographer: Dirgha Bir Gurung for Bharosa
- Best Actor (Female) : Rekha Thapa for Himmat
- Best Actor (Male) : Bhuwan KC for Duniya
- Best Director: Shiva Regmi for Duniya
- Special Approach in Film Production A: Alpabiram
- Special Approach in Film Production B: Jhankri
- Best Actor (Appreciable Acting): Rama Thapaliya for Alpabiram

== National Film Awards 2008 (2065 BS) ==
The Film Development Board of Nepal organized the National Film Awards 2008 Kathmandu.

Winners of the awards:

- Best Film: Jana Yuddha
- Best Director: Ujwal Ghimire for Kishmat
- Best Actor: Aakash Adhikari for Jana Yuddha
- Best Actress: Rekha Thapa for Kishmat
- Best Actor in Supporting Role: Rajesh Hamal for Maryadaa
- Best Actress in Supporting Role: Tara K.C for Jana Yuddha
- Best Editor: Banish Shah for Jana Yuddha
- Best Cinematographer: Raju Bikram Thapa for Darr
- Best Actress for Indigenous movie: Melina Manandhar for Balamaiju
- Best Actor for Indigenous movie: Tej Bahadur Tamang

The films and winners were selected from the films released in the year 2006 (2063 BS).

== National Film Awards 2008 (2065 BS) ==
The National Film Award 2008 (2065) was distributed on 1 July 2008. The awards were handed over by the then prime minister Pushpa Kamal Dahal (Prachanda) with legendary Indian actor Mala Sinha. The award was organized by the Film Development Board of Nepal. Janayudha was chosen as the best film and Ujwal Ghimire was awarded as best film director of the year for his film Kismat.

== National Film Awards 2010 (2067 BS) ==
The Film Development Board of Nepal organized the National Film Awards 2010 after a gap of three years at Rashtriya Naachghar, Kathmandu.

Winners of the awards:

- Lifetime Achievement Award: Uddhab Poudel
- Best Film: Chodi Gaye Paap Lagla
- Best Director: Ujwal Ghimire for Chodi Gaye Paap Lagla
- Best Actor: Anup Baral for Dasdhunga
- Best Actress: Sanchita Luitel for Chodi Gaye Paap Lagla
- Best Actor in Supporting Role: Dayahang Rai for Dasdhunga
- Best Actress in Supporting Role: Srijana Basnet for Sangharsa Jindagi Ko
- Best Writer: Krishnahari Baral for Hifajat
- Best Editor: Nimesh Shrestha for Dasdhunga
- Best Sound mixing: Uttam Neupane for Mero Euta Saathi Chha
- Best Cinematographer: Deepak Bajhracharya for Chodi Gaye Paap Lagla
- Best Indigenous Film: Balamaiju (Newari language film)

The films and winners were selected from the films released in the year 2009 (2066 BS).

== National Film Awards 2011 (2068 BS) ==
The Film Development Board of Nepal organized the National Film Awards 2011 at Shital Niwas, Kathmandu, where President Ram Baran Yadav presented the awards. Ujwal Ghimire won the best director national award 2011 for his film Andaj. Tara Bahadur Thapa (Kimvhey) won the best Editor National Film Award 2011 for his film "Desh". Yash Kumar won the best National playback singer Award 2011 from the movie Bato Muniko Phool

== National Film Awards 2012 (2069 BS) ==
The Film Development Board of Nepal organized the National Film Awards 2012 Kathmandu. Winners of the awards:

- Best Film: Notebook
- Best Director: Dinesh DC for Mayas Bar
- Best Actor: Wilson Bikram Rai for Ridam
- Best Actress: Jharana Thapa for Notebook
- Best Writer: Dev Nepal for Mero Katha
- Best Editor: Banish Shah for Notebook
- Best Cinematographer: Purusottyam Pradhan for Vijilaante 3D

The films and winners were selected from the films released in the year 2011 (2068 BS).

== National Film Awards 2013 ==
The Film Development Board of Nepal organized the National Film Awards 2014.The films and winners were selected from the films released in the year 2013.

- Lifetime Achievement Award: Yadav Kharel
- Best Movie: Sanghuro
- Best Director: Dipa Basnet for Antaraal
- Best Actor in a Leading Role (Male): Sushank Mainali for Sanghuro
- Best Actor in a Leading Role (Female): Garima Panta for Jhola
- Best Cinematographer: Gauri Shankar Dhunju for Shirish Ko Phul
- Best Editor: Lokesh Bajracharya for Karkash
- Best Writer: Binod Paudel for Sanghuro
- Best Music Director: Basanta Sapkota for Nai Nabhannu La 2
- Best Lyricist: Dr. Krishna Hari Baral for Nai Nabhannu La 2
- Best Indigenous Movie: Kusum

== National Film Awards 2014 (2070 BS) ==
The films and winners were selected from the films released in the year 2014. Winners of the awards:

- Best Film: Jhola
- Best Director: Yadav Kumar Bhattarai for Jhola
- Best Actor: Aaryan Sigdel for Mahashush
- Best Actress: Garima Panta for Jhola
- Best Actor (Supporting): Ramesh Budhathoki for Raajneeti
- Best Actress (Supporting): Laxmi Giri for Jhola
- Best Actor (Debut): Gaurav Pahari for Manjari
- Best Actress (Debut): Sujata Koirala for Manjari
- Best Writer: Hemraj B.C. for Hostel (2013 film)
- Best Editor: Badri Lamichhane for Mahashush
- Best Cinematographer: Purusottam Pradhan for Nai Nabhannu La 2
- Best Documentary Editor: Lawa Pyakurel for Nijamati: Under Fire ("The National Film Award is organized by the Film Development Board of Nepal. This is incorrect information; the Film Development Board of Nepal does not give awards for documentaries. Only feature films are eligible for the National Film Award.")
- Best Documentary Film: Nijamati: Under Fire ("The National Film Award is organized by the Film Development Board of Nepal. This is incorrect information; the Film Development Board of Nepal does not give awards for documentaries. Only feature films are eligible for the National Film Award.")

== National Film Awards 2015 (2071 BS) ==
The Film Development Board of Nepal organized the National Film Awards 2015 at Shital Niwas, Kathmandu, where President Ram Baran Yadav presented the awards.

Winners of the awards:

- Lifetime Achievement Award: Neer Shah
- Best Film: Kabbadi
- Best Actor: Dayahang Rai for Sambodhan
- Best Actress: Reecha Sharma for Talakjung vs Tulke and Sangam Bista for Love You Baba
- Best Director: Nischal Basnet for Talakjung vs Tulke
- Best Writer: Ram Babu Gurung and Upendra Subba for Kabbadi
- Best Editor: Nimesh Shrestha for Zhigrana
- Best Cinematographer: Shailendra Dhoj Karki for Zhigrana
- Best Indigenous Film: Matan

Out of the 87 films released in 2014 (2071 BS), 60 were considered for award nomination. The jury members were Karishma Manandhar, Rajendra Shalav, Kapil Parajuli, Hemanta Budhathoki and Dipendra Lama.

== National Film Awards 2016 (2072 BS) ==
The Film Development Board of Nepal organized the National Film Awards 2016 at Shital Niwas, Kathmandu. President Bidhya Devi Bhandari presented the awards.

Winners of the awards:

- Lifetime Achievement Award: Basundhara Bhusal
- Best Film: Pashupati Prasad
- Best Actor: Dayahang Rai for Kabaddi Kabaddi
- Best Actress: Namrata Shrestha for Classic
- Best Director: Dipendra K Khanal for Pashupati Prasad
- Best Writer: Khagendra Lamichhane for Pashupati Prasad
- Best Editor: Surendra Poudel for Classic
- Best Cinematographer: Pursottam Pradhan and Sanjay Lama for Dreams
- Best Indigenous Film: Yumpo Deurali (Gurung language film)

The decisions for the awards were made by a committee led by Ramesh Budhathoki. The members of the committee were Laya Sangarula, Sarita Lamichhane, Mohan Niraula, Sushil Poudel and Karun Thapa. The films and winners were selected from the films released in the year 2015 (2072 BS).

== National Film Award 2017(2073 BS) ==
Winners of the awards:

- Lifetime Achievement Award: Shubhadra Adhikari
- Best Film: Kalo Pothi
- Best Actor: Bipin Karki for Jatra
- Best Actress: Srijana Subba for Dying Candle
- Best Director: Deepak Rauniyar for Seto Surya | White Sun
- Best Writer: Min Bahadur Bam and Abinash Bikram Shah for Kalo Pothi
- Best Editor: Mitra Dev Gurung for Jatra
- Best Documentary Cinematographer: Oma Karki for Katha Nalapaniko
- Best Cinematographer: Shiva Ram Shrestha for Love Sasha
- Best Indigenous Film: Bhedi Gothalo
- Popular Film : Chakka Panja

== National Film Award 2018(2074 BS) ==
Winners of the awards:

- Lifetime Achievement Award: Kishor Rana Magar
- Best Film: Blind Rocks
- Best Actor: Puspa Khadka for Mangalam
- Best Actress: Benisha Hamal for Blind Rocks
- Best Director: Milan Chamling Rai for Blind Rocks
- Best Writer: Khagendra Lamichhane for Dhanapati
- Best Editor: Mitra Dev Gurung for Mangalam
- Best Cinematographer: Purusottam Pradhan for Kri
- Best Indigenous Film: Sherpa Language

== National Film Award 2019(2075 BS) ==
Winners of the awards:

- Lifetime Achievement Award: Tulsi Ghimire
- Best Film: Gopi
- Best Actor: Bipin Karki for Prasad
- Best Actress: Swastima Khadka for Bulbul
- Best Director: Binod Poudel for Bulbul
- Best Writer: Dipendra Lama and Shamipyaraj Timilsina for Gopi
- Best Editor: Nimesh Shrestha for Saili
- Best Cinematographer: Sanjaya Lama for Summer Love
- Best Indigenous Film: Rije Naya

== National Film Award 2021/2022(2077/2078 BS) ==
Winners of the awards:

- Jury Award: Gurkha: Beneath the Bravery
