= 9th NEFTA Film Awards =

The 9th NEFTA Film Awards were organized by the Nepal Film Technician Association and awarded in 2016. The awards ceremony was scheduled for December 23, 2016, in Dubai.

== Nominations ==
List of awards and nominations
Category	Nominations	Winner
Best Movie	Classic; Kabaddi; Prem Geet; Pashupati Prasad; Woda Number 6	
Best Actor	Aryan Sigdel – Classic; Saugat Malla – Fanko; Najir Husein – Hostel Returns; Dayahang Rai – Kabaddi Kabaddi; Khagendra Lamichhane – Pashupati Prasad	
Best Actress	Namrata Shrestha – Classic; Keki Adhikari – Fanko; Richa Sharma – Ko Afno; Pooja Sharma – Prem Geet; Menuka Pradhan – Resham Filili	
Best Director	Dinesh Raut – Classic; Ram Babu Gurung – Kabaddi Kabaddi; Sudarshan Thapa – Prem Geet; Dipendra K Khanal – Pashupati Prasad; Ujjwal Ghimire – Woda Number 6	

== See also ==
NEFTA Film Awards
