= Love Love Love (2017 film) =

- Directed by: Dipendra K Khanal
- Written by: Dipendra K Khanal
- Produced by: Sharmila Pandey
- Starring: Suraj Pandey; Swastima Khadka; Ramesh Budathoki; Rupa Rana; A. Gurung
- Cinematography: Niraj Kadel
- Edited by: Dirgha Khadka
- Music by: Songs: Suresh Rai; Background Scores: Shailesh Shrestha
- Production company: Suraj Cine Arts Pvt. Ltd.
- Distributed by: HighlightsNepal
- Release date: 14 April 2017 (Nepal)
- Running time: 138m
- Country: Nepal
- Language: Nepali
- Budget: 50 million NPR

Love Love Love is a 2017 Nepalese romance drama comedy social thriller film, directed and written by Dipendra K Khanal, and produced by Sharmila Pandey, under the banner of Suraj Cine Arts Pvt. Ltd with HighlightsNepal and Aslesha Entertainment. The film stars Suraj Pandey and Swastima Khadka in the lead roles, alongside Ramesh Budathoki, Rupa Rana and A. Gurung. The film is about a man who falls in love with a girl who does not love him in return. The film was shot in Pokhara, Manakamana, Panchase and Gosaikunda.

== Plot ==
The main character, Suraj (Suraj Pandey), falls in love with his childhood friend, Samriddhi (Swastima Khadka), but soon realizes that she does not return his feelings. One day, he takes Samriddhi on a tour in hopes of winning over her affection.

== Cast and Crew ==
=== Cast ===
- Suraj Pandey as Suraj
- Swastima Khadka as Samriddhi
- Ramesh Budathoki
- Rupa Rana
- A. Gurung

=== Crew ===
- Dipendra K Khanal - Director
- Uttam Neupane - Sound Engineer
- Sahailesh Shrestha - Background Score

== Production ==
=== Budget ===
The film's budget was set about 50 million Nepalese rupees (approximately USD$400,000 as of 2023) and the film was listed in highest Nepalese films budget and it was in no.3.

== Soundtrack ==
No.	Title	Lyrics	Music	Singer(s)	Length
1.	"Timi Aghi Aghi"	Suresh Rai	Suresh Rai	Arif Rauf	4:39
2.	"Ek Sabda"	Suresh Rai	Suresh Rai	Sanup Poudel, Nikita Thapa	4:44
3.	"Dhuntanana"	Suresh Rai	Suresh Rai	Dhamendra Sewan, Nikita Thapa	6:00
4.	"Yo Maya Ho"	Suresh Rai	Suresh Rai	Koshish Chhetri	5:18
