= Pashupati Prasad 2: Bhasme Don =

2023 Nepalese film directed by Dipendra K. Khanal

Pashupati Prasad 2
- Nepali: पशुपति प्रसाद २: भष्मे डन
- Directed by: Dipendra K. Khanal
- Written by: Khagendra Lamichhane
- Starring: Bipin Karki; Saugat Malla; Swastima Khadka
- Cinematography: Krishna Bahadur Thapa
- Edited by: Banish Shah
- Release date: 21 October 2023 (Nepal)
- Running time: 2hrs 27 min
- Country: Nepal
- Language: Nepali
- Budget: रू3 crore (US$190,000)
- Box office: रु 8.50 crore

Pashupati Prasad 2: Bhasme Don (Nepali: पशुपति प्रसाद २: भष्मे डन) is a 2023 Nepali film that is the sequel to the movie Pashupati Prasad, which is written and directed by Dipendra K. Khanal. Released on October 21, 2023, the film stars Bipin Karki, Saugat Malla, Swastima Khadka, Prakash Ghimire, and more. The film met with negative to mixed reviews from critics with many critics and audience criticizing its lack of newness in story, screenplay, direction but performances of the cast met with praise. The film broke several opening day records and went on to become one of the highest grossing film of all time in Nepal owing to its huge opening day collection.

== Plot ==
After the tragic death of Pashupati Prasad, Bhasme searches for his identity. While struggling to collect 10 lakh rupees, he is robbed and must get his money back.

== Cast ==
- Bipin Karki as Bhasme Don/Bhuwan Bahadur Bham
- Saugat Malla as Kali Prasad
- Swastima Khadka as Durga maa/Maina
- Prakash Ghimire as Mitbaa
- Lokendra Lekhak as Shilajeet seller/ Bhasme Don's Father
- Rabindra Singh Baniya as Hanuman
- Barsha Siwakoti as Bunu
- Mishree Thapa as Aama
- Khagendra Lamichhane as Pashupati Prasad (uncredited role)

== Release ==
The film was released on October 21, 2023, all over Nepal.
