= Bulbul (2019 film) =

2019 Nepalese film

- Theatrical release poster
- Nepali: बुलबुल
- Directed by: Binod Paudel
- Written by: Binod Paudel
- Screenplay by: Binod Paudel
- Produced by: Sirjana Koirala; Purushottam Pandey; Raju Poudel; Abeeral Thapa; Bhim Thapa
- Starring: Swastima Khadka; Mukun Bhusal; Sound Design, Film Mix: Uttam Neupane
- Cinematography: Sushan Prajapati
- Edited by: Animesh Sapkota
- Music by: Nischal Basnet; Koshish Chhetri; Udgam Pariyar; Rajina Rimal
- Production company: Awaken Production
- Release date: 15 February 2019 (Nepal)
- Running time: 116 minutes
- Country: Nepal
- Language: Nepali

Bulbul (Nepali: बुलबुल) is a 2019 Nepalese drama film written and directed by Binod Poudel. It stars Swastima Khadka, and Mukun Bhusal in the lead roles. The story line is about a woman who drives tempo for a living in Kathmandu. The film was released on 15 February 2019. It was selected as the Nepalese entry for the Best International Feature Film at the 92nd Academy Awards, but it was not nominated.

== Plot ==
A story about a woman who drives a tempo (3-wheeled micro-bus service). The film touches on topics of couples separated because one person leaves to work abroad, and life for the person who stays behind, among many other themes.

== Cast ==
- Swastima Khadka as Ranakala
- Mukun Bhusal as Chopendra

== Awards ==
Year	Award	Category	Recipient	Result	Ref(s)
2020	National Film Awards Nepal	Best Director	Binod Poudel	Won	
2020	National Film Awards Nepal	Best Actress	Swastima Khadka	Won	
2020	Academy Awards	Best International Feature Film	Bulbul	Selected to represent Nepal	

== See also ==
- List of submissions to the 92nd Academy Awards for Best International Feature Film
- List of Nepalese submissions for the Academy Award for Best International Feature Film
