= Roshan Das =

Biography Of Nepali Movie Director

Roshan Das रोशन दास
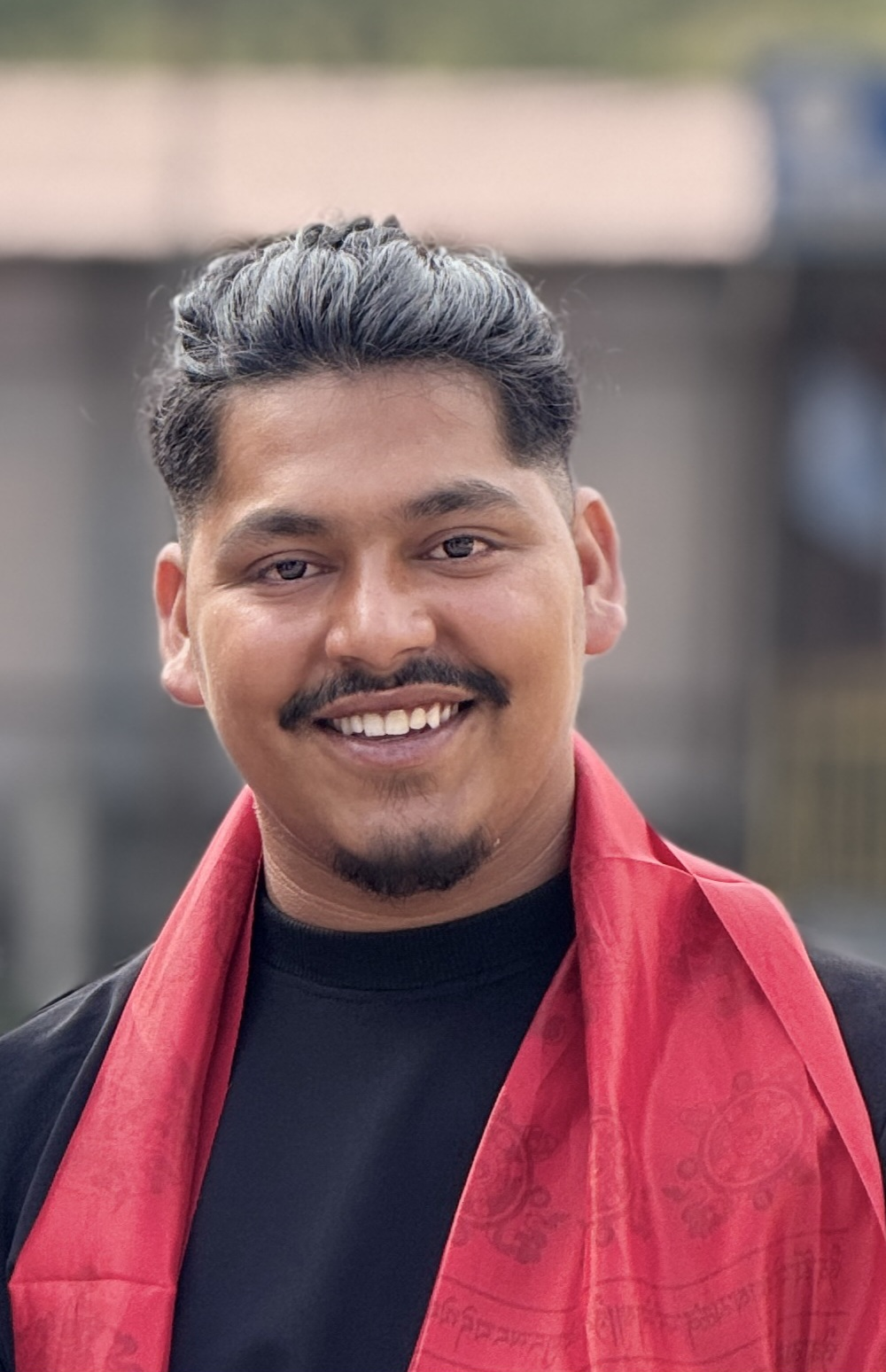

Background information
- Born: 21 February 2002 (age 24); Godaita, Sarlahi District, Nepal
- Origin: Nepali
- Occupations: Director, Lyricist

Roshan Das (Nepali: रोशन दास; born February 21, 2002) is a Nepalese film director, lyricist, and music video creator. He is recognized as a rising filmmaker in Nepalese cinema, transitioning from a prolific career in music video and web series direction to mainstream feature films with his directorial debut, Pratibairam.

== Early life and background ==
Das was born on February 21, 2002, in Godaita, Sarlahi District, Nepal, to Ram Pukar Das. He developed an interest in visual storytelling during his childhood, experimenting with his father's video camera to capture local events. As a teenager, he began producing short films and music videos for his YouTube channel. He later moved to Kathmandu to pursue a career in the entertainment industry.

== Career ==
=== Early work and music videos ===
Das entered professional direction at the age of 18. Over the next four years, he directed more than 50 to 70 music videos spanning various genres. He frequently served as a lyricist for his projects, writing tracks such as "Yehi ho Maya", "Timle K Garchhas", "Bhul Bhayo", "Baisa Ko Pyash", and "Naya Itihas".

During this formative period, Das also gained industry experience by working on feature films in technical capacities. He served as the assistant director for the film Bichhed, the Chief Assistant Director for Firefirey Firiri, and the Director of Photography (DOP) for Mahima Gadimai.

=== Breakthrough with Aarati and feature film debut ===
In early 2024, Das directed the web series Aarati Written By Hikmat Sharma, produced under the banner of Rays Entertainment. The series, which focused on contemporary social issues, received positive audience reception and established his reputation for handling long-form, socially conscious narratives.

In May 2025, Das announced his transition into mainstream feature cinema with his directorial debut, Pratibairam (प्रतिवैरम्). Written by Yubaraj Bhattarai, the action-drama film focuses on social and political issues, crime, and friendship within the Madhesh region of Nepal and its borderlines. The film's principal photography was completed over a 45-day schedule, with 15 days of shooting in Sarlahi and 30 days in Siraha. Starring an ensemble cast including Samrat Das, Alisha Bastola, Birendra Singh Kushwaha, and Ramesh Budhathoki, the film's official teaser was released in January 2026.

== Songs ==
SN	Songs Name	Credit	Singer	Release date	Reference
1	Timle K Garchhas	Director/Lyricist	Malina Rai	2021	
2	Naya Itihas	Director/Lyricist	Rajan Karki	2022	
3	Yehi ho Maya	Director/Lyricist	Rachana Rimal , Shailesh Mishra	2023	
4	Bhul Bhayo	Lyricist	Shailesh Mishra	2023	
5	Baisa Ko Pyash	Director	Ashmita Adhikari	2024	
6	Afnai Swartha	Director/Lyricist	Dhurba Bisco	2024	
7	Aadat	Director	Pratap Das, Annu Chaudhary	2024	
8	Rang Kada	Director	Manish Adhikari	2024	
9	Bayan	Director	Pratap Das, Samikshya Adhikari	2025	

== Movie ==
SN	Movie name	Credit	Cast	Release date	Reference
1	Bichchhed	Assistant Director	Mukun Bhusal, Laxmi Bardewa	2023	
2	Firefirey Firiri	Chief Assistant Director	Sandip Shrestha, Bhawana Upreti	2025	
3	Mahima Gadimai	D.O.P	Ashok Albela, Shiv Kurmi	2025	
4	Pratibairam	Director	Samrat Das, Birendra Kushwah, Alisha Bastola, Supragya Sharma, Nabin Shrestha, Ramesh Budhathoki	Releasing soon	

== Awards ==
SN	Awards	Awards Title	Result	Reference
1	5th Epic Nepal Music Award 2081 BS	Best Modern Music Video Director - Aadat	Won	
2	4th Silver Music Award 2025	Best Music Video Director - Aafnai Swartha	Won	
3	7th Jyoti Films Music Award	Best Music Video Director - Aadat	Won	
4	2nd Jaya Prapti Music Award	Best Music video Director - Rang Kada	Won	
