= Changa Chet =

2018 Nepalese film directed by Dipendra K Khanal

- Film poster
- Directed by: Dipendra K Khanal
- Written by: Pradip Bhardwaj
- Produced by: Madhav Wagle; Sharmila Pandey
- Starring: Ayushman Joshi; Priyanka Karki; Rabindra Jha; Shishir Bangdel; Arpan Thapa; Sandip Chhetri; Paramita RL Rana
- Edited by: Dirgha Khadka
- Release date: 2 November 2018
- Country: Nepal
- Language: Nepali

Changa Chet is a 2018 Nepalese romantic comedy-drama film directed by Dipendra K Khanal. The film is written by Pradip Bhardwaj who is the highest paid screenwriter of nepalese film industry, and produced by Madhav Wagle and Sharmila Pandey. The film stars Ayushman Joshi, Rabindra Jha, Sandip Chhetri, Arpan Thapa, Priyanka Karki, Paramita Rana, Surakshya Panta in the lead roles. The prop currency used during the shooting of the movie lead to the prosecution of the movie producer Madhav Wagle, art director Sudip Tamang and an Assistant Mahendra Bogati.

The film was released on November 2, 2018 and met with positive response from critics and audience. The film was a commercial success at the box office.

== Plot ==
Three people meet who have different aspirations of their own. They face a lot of challenges after they borrow lot of money of a gangster but they lose the money.

== Cast ==
- Ayushman Joshi as Niraj / Siddhartha
- Rabindra Jha as Udit Narayan
- Arpan Thapa as Mukunda
- Sandip Chhetri as Thame
- Surakshya Panta as Manisha
- Paramita RL Rana

== Soundtrack ==
No.	Title	Lyrics	Music	Singer(s)	Length
1.	"Gojima Daam Chaina"	Harihar Timilsina	Rajan Raj Shiwakoti	Rajan Raj Shiwakoti, Melina Rai, Greeshma Shiwakoti	4:45
2.	"Dhalki Dhalki Nachana"	Rajendra Bhatt	Rajendra Bhatt	Almoda Rana Uprety	5:04
3.	"Changaa Chait - title song"	Koshish Chhetri	Koshish Chhetri	Koshish Chhetri	3:01
