= Swastima Khadka =

Nepalese film actress (born 1995)

- स्वस्तिमा खड्का
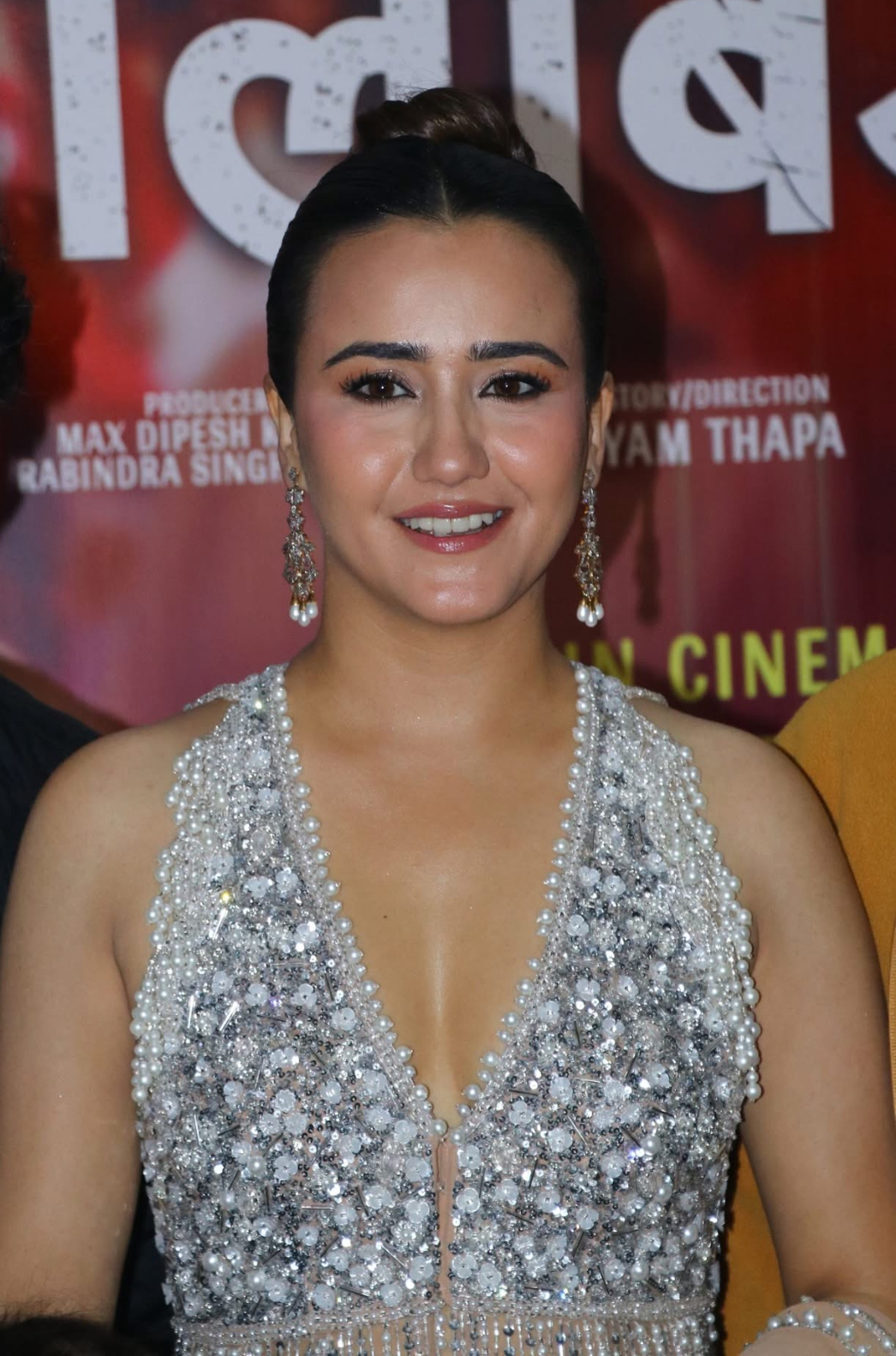
- Khadka in 2025
- Born: 4 July 1995 (age 31); Kathmandu, Nepal
- Occupations: Actress; model
- Spouse: Nischal Basnet (m. 2017)

Swastima Khadka (Nepali: स्वस्तिमा खड्का; born 4 July 1995) is a Nepali actress who predominantly works in Nepali cinema. One of Nepal's highest-paid actresses, her accolades include two National Film Awards and four Kamana Film Awards. Noted by critics for her performances, Khadka is credited for singularly paralleling her male contemporaries by leading star vehicles in a male-dominated industry.

Khadka debuted as an actress in the teen film Hostel Returns (2015), for which she was nominated for the National Film Awards for Best Supporting Actress. The social drama Chhakka Panja 2 (2017), marked a turning point in her career. She gained further success with the drama film Bulbul (2019). The film was selected as the Nepalese entry for the Best International Feature Film at the 92nd Academy Awards, but it was not nominated. This was followed by several commercial successes including Hajar Juni Samma (2019), Chiso Manchhe (2022) and Pashupati Prasad 2: Bhasme Don (2023). She has also starred in the female-led films Behuli from Meghauli (2023) and Lalibazar (2026), which earned her critical and awards recognition.

In addition to her acting career, she is the celebrity endorser for several brands and products. Khadka is married to director Nischal Basnet. On Instagram, she is one of the most-followed Nepalese woman.

== Personal and early life ==
Swastima Khadka was born on 4 July 1995 in Kathmandu, Nepal. She completed her School Leaving Certificate (SLC) from Birendra Sainik Awasiya Mahavidyalaya, Bhaktapur. Khadka holds a three-year diploma in architectural engineering from the Thapathali Campus. At the age of 17, she participated in the Nepali national beauty pageant Miss Teen Nepal. She told The Nepali Man that Miss Nepal was "a bit far-fetched for her" and described the experience as "a stepping stone" for her.

On 14 December 2015, Khadka and film director Nischal Basnet became engaged in the presence of close relatives. They married on 17 February 2016, in a private ceremony held in Kathmandu.

== Career ==
=== 2015–2017: Film breakthrough ===
In 2015, Khadka debuted as a film actress in Suraj Bhusal's Hostel Returns, where she starred alongside Sushil Shrestha, Najir Hussain, and Sunil Rawal. In the film, she played Elina, who is in a love triangle with two boys in her school. For Hostel Returns, she was nominated for Best Supporting Actress in the National Film Awards. For her second film, she appeared in Dipendra K. Khanal's romantic-drama Love Love Love (2017) where she portrayed Samriddhi, a girl whose childhood friend's love for her is not reciprocated. Her portrayal of Samriddhi was praised by critics, and The Himalayan Times wrote, "Khadka's act is appealing. Her body language, gestures, and dialogue delivery are brilliant." Khadka also made a guest appearance in "Kutu Ma Kutu" (2017). Her appearance in the song was praised by audiences and critics. The reviewer for Nepali Sansar wrote, "Swastima Khadka danced gracefully to this catchy Nepali number. Her sweet smile and performance will flash before us every time we listen to Kutu Ma Kutu". The song became the first Nepali music video to reach 200 million views on YouTube.

Later in 2017, Khadka appeared in Deepa Shree Niraula's social drama film Chhakka Panja 2. In the film, she plays Akansha, a student who wants to travel to Australia to study but struggles with the IELTS exam required to enter the country. The Kathmandu Post reported that Chhakka Panja 2 earned around 60 million Nepalese rupees within the first six days of release and went on to become the second-highest-grossing Nepali film. When asked about her experience working with the cast members of Chhakka Panja 2, Khadka said, "Ah, I got to learn a lot! They have already been in the field for more than 20 years; they know a lot more than I do. And not only did I learn stuff about movies while working with them, but I also understand other areas like dealing with the media, interacting with them… everything! I admit, I get overshadowed by them sometimes, but then, rather than a disadvantage, I like to think of it as an advantage to stay on the sideline and absorb what I can from them. After all, they are the superstars!"

=== 2018–present: Established actress ===
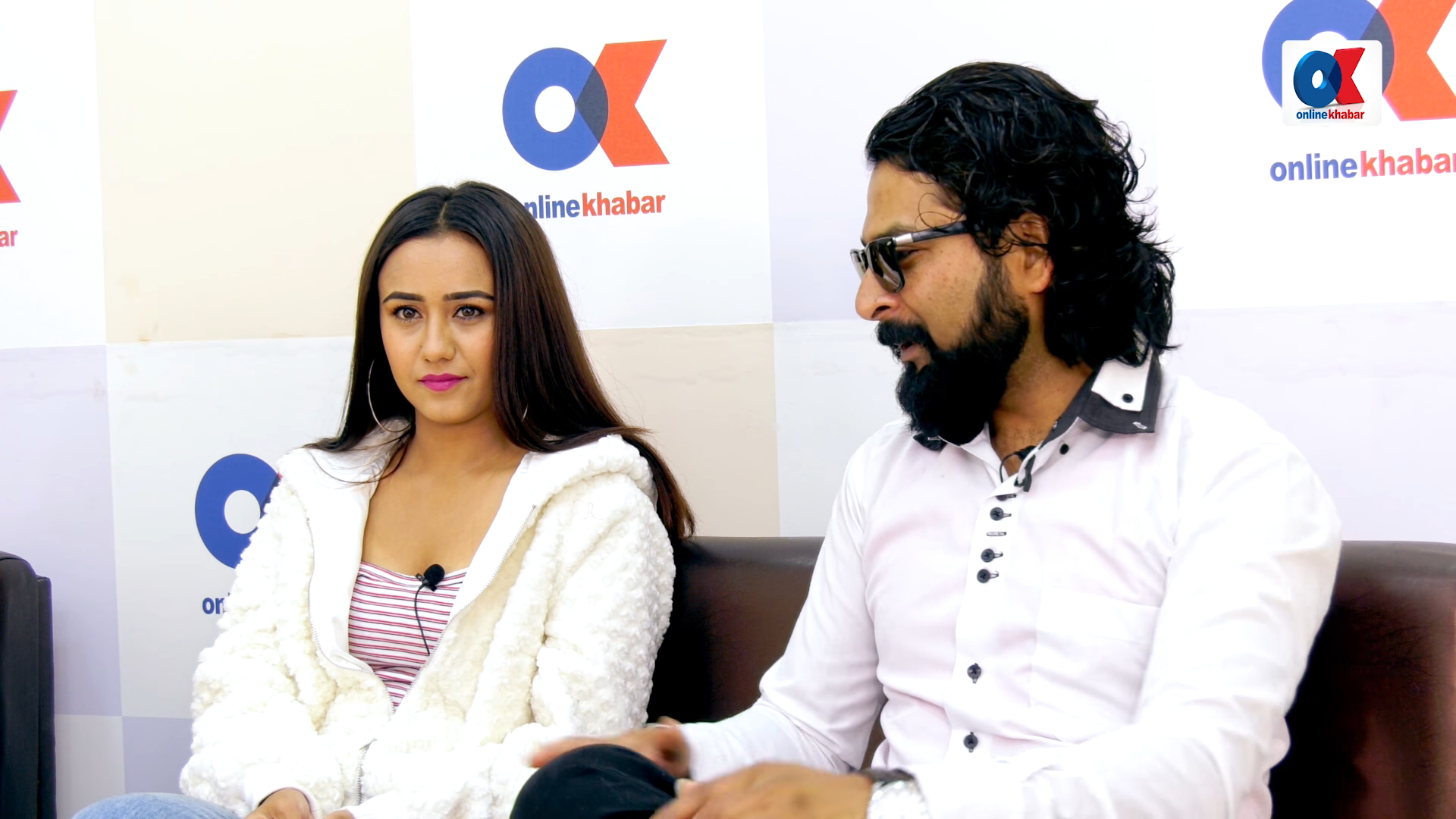
Swastima Khadka (left, pictured in 2019) promoting Bulbul with Mukun Bhusal (right).

In 2018, Swastima Khadka starred in Bikash Raj Acharya's romantic-drama Nai Nabhannu La 5, the fifth installment in the Nai Nabhannu La film series. In the film, Khadka plays Ranjana, a teenage girl who shares a romance with Neer, played by debutant actor Abhisek Nepal. Her performance was praised by Diwakar Pyakurel of Onlinekhabar, who wrote, "Khadka has acted as stubborn late teen; and she does it quite well." The film surpassed two crore (20 million) Nepalese rupees (approximately US$163,500 in 2020) in its first weekend. Later in the same year, Khadka had a minor role in the film Chhakka Panja 3 where she played the role of a Brahmin girl who becomes the love interest of a Janajati boy. Later, she appeared in Jai Bhole (2018) alongside Khagendra Lamichhane, Saugat Malla, and Buddhi Tamang. The film focuses on Jai (Khagendra Lamichhane) who falls for Nisha (Swastima Khadka), but Nisha's sworn brother interferes with them.

In 2019, Khadka appeared alongside Mukun Bhusal in Binod Paudel's drama film Bulbul. In the film, Khadka plays Ranakala, a student driver in Kathmandu. The film was selected as the Nepalese entry for the Best International Feature Film at the 92nd Academy Awards, but it was not nominated. About her performance, she told The Nepali Man, "Out of all my six movies, I received maximum appreciation [for] Bulbul. So this does mean that somewhere there is a solid part of [the] audience that [does] enjoy these independent movies. Bulbul went onto its fourth week. In this time, for any movie to run into its second week is a very good response. So, Bulbul being on its fourth is a huge feat in itself. That is why I am pretty sure that an audience who [does] understand such art movies is growing". Khadka's performance was met with critical acclaim. Prakriti Kandel, writing for Nepali Times, praised her, saying:

Swastima Khadka's authentic portrayal of Ranakala is refreshing and captivates. Her hardships are writ large in her sombre expressions and sharp dialogues which give us a nuanced, all-round portrait of her complex psychology. One can't help but root for this simple, independent girl as she makes a living in a difficult city. She is fierce at her job, tender as a mother, understanding as a friend, struggling as a wife. But overall Ranakala embodies the female shakti.

— Prakriti Kandel, Nepali Times

After Bulbul, Khadka appeared in Hajar Juni Samma, and Ghamad Shere the same year. In Hajar Juni Samma, Khadka plays Avantika, a medical student from Sikkim. Sunny Mahat of The Annapurna Express described the film as "a movie you’d want to watch with your female friends, just to see them cringe at the creepy old man trying to find a match for his son". Rupak Risal of Moviemandu wrote that Khadka had "done justice to [her] role". In Ghamad Shere, where Khadka starred as Gauri, an English teacher and sister-in-law of the main character Shere, played by Khadka's husband Nischal Basnet. Abhimanyu Dixit of The Kathmandu Post criticized the decision to cast Basnet and Khadka in the same film as siblings-in-law, writing, "To cast Swastima as a reel-life sister-in-law to her real-life husband Nischal might have seemed like a good idea, or something ‘different’ on paper, but it hardly works. Both actors try hard to be consistent with their respective characters but it's not enough to make us believe that they're anything except Nischal and Swastima, the real-life couple."

== Filmography ==
Year	Film	Role	Notes	Ref(s)
2015	Hostel Returns	Elina Khadka	Debut film	
2017	Love Love Love	Samriddhi		
2017	Prem Geet 2	—	Special appearance in the song "Motorcycle ma"	
2017	Dui Rupaiya	—	Special appearance in the song "Kutu ma kutu"	
2017	Chhakka Panja 2	Aakanshya		
2018	Jai Bhole	Nisha		
2018	Nai Nabhannu La 5	Anjana/Ranjana		
2018	Chhakka Panja 3		Special appearance in the song "Pahilo number ma"	
2019	Bulbul	Ranakala		
2019	Hajar Juni Samma	Avantika		
2019	Ghamad Shere	Gauri		
2022	Chapali Height 3	—		
2022	Thirimali	—	Mollywood film; special appearance in the song "Rang Birangi"	
2022	Chiso Manchhe	Puspa		
2023	Pashupati Prasad 2: Bhasme Don	Devi Maa / Maina		
2023	Aincho Paincho	Rupa		
2023	Dimag Kharab	Sachhi		
2024	Behuli from Meghauli	Meena		
2025	Basanta	Shanti		
2026	Lalibazar	Madhubala		

== Awards and nominations ==
List of accolades received by Swastima Khadka
Year	Award	Category	Film	Result	Ref(s)
2016	National Film Awards Nepal	Best Supporting Actress	Hostel Returns	Nominated	
2019	SAARC Film Festival	Best Performance	Bulbul	Won	
2019	National Film Awards Nepal	Best Actor in a Leading Role (Female)	Bulbul	Won	
2026	National Film Awards Nepal	Best Actor in a Leading Role (Female)	Dimag Kharab	Won	
2026	OnlineKhabar's 40under40	40under40 for the year 2083 BS	Overall	Won	
