= National Film Awards (disambiguation) =

The National Film Awards is the most prominent film award ceremony in India.

National Film Awards may also refer to:

- National Film Awards (Bangladesh)
- National Film Awards (Nepal)
- National Film Awards UK

== See also ==
- List of film awards
- Thailand National Film Association Awards
