= Dadyaa =

2016 Nepalese short film directed by Pooja Gurung & Bibhusan Basnet

- Film poster
- Directed by: Pooja Gurung, Bibhusan Basnet
- Written by: Bibhusan Basnet; Pooja Gurung
- Produced by: Marie Legrand; Rani Massalha; Prajjwal S.J.B. Rana
- Starring: Devi Damai; Parimal Damai
- Edited by: Chandra-Bindu
- Music by: Parimal Damai Sound Design,5.1 Mix: Uttam Neupane
- Release date: 1 September 2016 (Nepal)
- Running time: 17 Min
- Country: Nepal
- Language: Nepali

Dadyaa (sometimes known as Dadyaa: The Woodpeckers of Rotha) is a 2016 Nepalese Drama short film, directed and written by Pooja Gurung and Bibhusan Basnet. Released under the banner of Eye Core Films. The film stars Devi Damai and Parimal Damai in the lead roles. The film released on 1 September 2016 in Nepal.

== Plot ==
In a small village in Nepal two elderly couples Atimaley and Devi are only living persons in the village. They have to leave their village after their neighbor leaves without any notice to protect their memory.

== Cast ==
- Devi Damai
- Parimal Damai

== Awards ==
Sundance Film Festival 2017

- Special Jury Award - Chintan Rajbhandari (Won)
- Short Film Grand Jury Prize - Bibhusan Basnet and Pooja Gurung (Nominated)
- Short film cinematography (won)

Kimff 2016

- Fiction Category (Won)
