= Hajar Juni Samma =

2019 Nepali romantic-drama film

- Theatrical release poster
- Directed by: Bikash Raj Acharya
- Written by: Bikash Raj Acharya\Samipya Raj Timalsena
- Produced by: Bishal Chambling
- Starring: Aaryan Sigdel; Priyanka Karki; Sanchita Luitel; Swastima Khadka; Salon Basnet; Shivahari Poudel; Anubhav Regmi
- Cinematography: Purusottam Pradhan
- Production company: Mata Pathivara Films
- Release date: 15 August 2019 (Nepal)
- Country: Nepal
- Language: Nepali

Hajar Juni Samma is a 2019 Nepali romantic-drama, directed by Bikash Raj Acharya. The film is produced by Bishal Chambling under the banner of Mata Pathivara Films. Hajar Juni Samma is about a retired singer seeking to find a match for his son. The film stars Aryan Sigdel, Priyanka Karki, Sanchita Luitel, Swastima Khadka, Salon Basnet, and Shivahari Paudel.

== Plot ==
Siddhanth (Aryan Sigdel) is a retired singer who owns a guitar shop. He has two adopted sons Nishant (Salon Basnet) and Atharba (Akhilesh Pradhan). Siddhanth wants to find a match for his son Atharba.

== Cast ==
- Aryan Sigdel as Siddhanth
- Priyanka Karki as Maya
- Sanchita Luitel
- Swastima Khadka as Avantika
- Salon Basnet as Nishant
- Akhilesh Pradhan as Atharba
- Shivahari Paudel

== Soundtrack ==
Original Motion Picture Soundtrack
No.	Title	Lyrics	Music	Singer(s)	Length
1.	"Hajar Juni Samma (title song)"	Pawan Chamling	Yogendra Ghatani	Aayush Kc	4:51
2.	"MG Rodaima"	Rajan Raj Siwakoti	Rajan Raj Siwakoti	Rajan Raj Siwakoti, Melina Rai	4:21
3.	"Satya Satya"	Manas Bikram Thapa	Prabin Paudel	Sugam Pokharel	3:22
4.	"Sukuti Sadhana Sauni"	Eknarayan Bhandari	Basanta Sapkota	Mina Niraula, Pralhad Timilsina	4:21
Total length:					16:15

== Production ==
Hajar Juni Samma's song "MG Rodaima" was entirely in Gangtok, capital of Sikkim, mostly around the MG Marg.

== Release and reception ==
Sunny Mahat of The Annapurna Express wrote, "Now this is a movie you'd want to watch with your female friends, just to see them cringe at the creepy old man trying to find a match for his son". Abhimanyu Dixit of The Kathmandu Post, wrote "But Chamling's [producer] efforts have been wasted because the delivery is lazy. So is the screenplay and dialogue, written by director Bikash Raj Acharya and Samipya Timilsina". Rupak Risal of Moviemanu praised the actors' performance in the film.
