= Ghamad Shere =

- घामड शेरे
- Directed by: Hem Raj BC
- Written by: Hem Raj BC
- Produced by: Hem Raj BC; Simosh Sunuwar
- Starring: Nischal Basnet; Swastima Khadka; Gauri Malla; Sushma Niraula; Badal Bhatta
- Music by: Shailesh Shrestha
- Release date: 29 November 2019
- Country: Nepal
- Language: Nepali

Ghamad Shere is a 2019 romantic drama film, directed and written by Hem Raj BC. It stars Nischal Basnet, Swastima Khadka, Gauri Malla, Sushma Niraula, and Badal Bhatta.

== Plot ==
Shere (Nischal Basnet) returns from abroad determined to do something in his village. His wife is not happy thinking that he is going to spend his money wastefully. He is conned by the local leader into buying flooded land where he starts farming. One night flood wipes out his land and leaves him broke. It is also revealed that Shere's wife was having an affair and she flees with her lover. Shere and his son are taken care of by his sister-in-law (Swastima Khadka). Shere fights for his land and goes on to sue the river when he is advised so. His wife returns but he chooses his sister-in-law. Meanwhile he wins his court battle and is awarded the river contract as a compensation.

== Cast ==
- Nischal Basnet as Sher Bahadur
- Swastima Khadka as Gauri
- Gauri Malla
- Sushma Niraula as Parbati
- Lokendra Lekhak as Bhyaguta
- Badal Bhatta

== Reception ==
Abhimanyu Dixit of The Kathmandu Post wrote, "The premise of Ghamad Shere had everything going for it. It's the kind of story that is almost never told in Nepali cinema, with a cast consisting of famous faces, a seasoned cinematographer and a director with many hits under his belt. It had a strong socio-political message and a handful of brilliant scenes. But even all this couldn't save the film". Diwakar Pyakurel of OnlineKhabar wrote, "Both as a satire and a love story, this movie has raised concerns over some genuine issues. Thanks to the interesting plot and convincing acting, the movie turns out to be a good watch. If the team succeeds in avoiding some of the formulaic errors, it could produce better movies in the days to come". Sunny Mahat of The Annapurna Express wrote, "Basnet and Khadka don't lack fans. And watching the two together on screen could be a treat for them. For others, the film is marginally below average and you may want to rethink how much spare time you have for it".
