= Safar (2016 film) =

2016 Nepali film directed by Ashish Shrestha

- Safar
- Directed by: Ashish Shrestha
- Written by: Keshav Khadka
- Produced by: Keshav Khadka
- Starring: Manan Sapkota, Sanjay Gupta, Shabir Pokharel, Nurja Shrestha
- Music by: Background Scores: Shailesh Shrestha
- Production company: Yuva Films
- Release date: September 2016
- Language: Nepali

Safar is a 2016 Nepali film, directed by Ashish Shrestha. It was written by Keshav Khadka and features Sanjay Gupta, Eric Hanson, Shibir Pokharel, Manan Sapkota, and Nurja Shrestha. Music of the film was composed by Swaroop Raj Acharya, Ujjwal Meghi Gurung, and Dharmendra Sewan.

It is about three childhood buddies Gaurav, Suman and Rohit, who take off on a road trip from Dallas to San Francisco after Suman decides to go back to Nepal.

The movie received generally positive reviews after its release, especially receiving praise from bringing a story of expatriate Nepalese. The film was also praised for direction by an expatriate director, for excellent cinematography and including scenery of various parts of the United States in the film. The film was shot entirely in the United States. Locations include Dallas, Denver, Grand Canyon, Las Vegas, Hoover Dam, San Francisco. The cinematography was done by Jacob Berardi and the background score is by Shailesh Shrestha.
