= Jerryy =

- Promotional poster
- Directed by: Hem Raj BC
- Written by: Hem Raj BC; Samrat Prasad Gauchan
- Produced by: Manoj Sherchan
- Starring: Anmol K.C. Anna Sharma; Gaurav pahadi Amalya Sharma; Abhishek Man Sherchan; Yash SJB Rana
- Cinematography: Shailendra D Karki
- Edited by: Surendra Poudel
- Music by: Songs: Naren Limbu; Herculesh Basnet; Background Scores: Shailesh Shrestha; Sound Design & Mix by: Uttam Neupane
- Production company: Falcon Pictures
- Release date: 14 November 2014
- Running time: 138 mins
- Country: Nepal
- Language: Nepali

Jerryy is a Nepali romance film directed by Hem Raj BC. featuring Anmol K.C. and Anna Sharma in the lead roles. The film revolves around Jaiveer "Jerryy" Rana (Anmol K.C.) who loves to live an adventurous life, and the trials and tribulations that he suffers during his life and love life with Akansha.

The film was praised for the direction of Hemraj BC, its screenplay, and the performance of Anna Sharm.

== Plot ==
Jaiveer "Jerryy" Rana is a casanova and defines love as like a no-warranty mobile, but his definition fails when he meets the adorable Akanshya (Anna Sharma) on a trip to Mustang. Akanshya loves photography. This film is all about the journey of love between Jerryy and Akanshya which ends sadly with the death of Jerryy.

== Cast ==
- Anmol K.C. as Jaiveer Rana, "Jerryy"
- Anna Sharma as Akanshya
- Amaliya Sharma
- Gaurav Pahadi
- Abhishek Man Sherchan
- Yash SJB Rana

== Awards and nominations ==
| Ceremony | Category | Recipient | Result |
|---|---|---|---|
| NFDC awards 2015 | Hira Best Movie | Falcon Pictures | Nominated |
| NFDC awards 2015 | Shiva Best Actor (Male) | Anmol K.C. | Nominated |
| 8th NEFTA Film Award 2015 | Best Sound Mixing | Uttam Neupane | Won |

== Reception ==
The film earned about 84.72 lakhs gross in three days. Jerryy earned 2.8 crore in its lifetime and was one of the few films of the year to achieve this.
