= Sushma Karki =

Nepalese actress

- Born: 14 February 1986; Bardiya, Nepal
- Occupations: Actress, model

Sushma Karki (Nepali: सुष्मा कार्की) is a Nepalese glamour model and film actress, known for her works in Nepali Cinema. She began her acting career with Arun Khatri.

== Media spotlight ==
Karki became popular because of her brother Rejan bala who supported her for item dance Udhreko choli in Nepali movie Loot and for her bold role in movie Bindass (2012). The item dance made her career established in Nepali movie industry. She has also received a lot of coverage over her tattoo and bikini pictures.

== Filmography ==
Key
†	Denotes films that have not yet been released

Year	Title	Role	Language	Notes
2009	Mero Euta Saathi Cha	Bindu	Nepali	
2011	Batch No. 16	Sheetal	Nepali	
2012	Loot		Nepali	Special appearance in an item song
2012	Bindaas	Megha	Nepali	
2013	Bindaas 2		Nepali	
2013	Notebook		Nepali	
2017	Sakas		Nepali	
2018	Romeo and Muna		Nepali	
2019	Adalat		Nepali	
2019	Gupt †		Nepali	Releasing on 31 May 2019
