= Behuli from Meghauli =

- Theatrical release poster
- बेहुली फ्रम मेघौली
- Directed by: Sajan Kafle; Aakash Baral
- Written by: Sajan Kafle; Aakash Baral
- Produced by: Nischal Basnet; Swastima Khadka
- Starring: Nischal Basnet; Swastima Khadka; Bijay Baral
- Cinematography: Narendra Mainali
- Edited by: Nimesh Shrestha
- Music by: Rohit Shakya
- Production companies: Black Horse Pictures; Meghauli Films
- Distributed by: DCN Nepal; Apple Entertainment
- Release date: 3 October 2024
- Running time: 2hrs 13min
- Country: Nepal
- Budget: रू1.5 crore (equivalent to ₹0.00 or US$0.00 in 2026)
- Box office: रू2.25 crore (equivalent to ₹0.00 or US$0.00 in 2026) (3 days collection)

Behuli from Meghauli (Nepali: बेहुली फ्रम मेघौली, transl. Bride from Meghauli) is a 2024 Nepalese comedy-drama film written and directed by Sajan Kafle and Aakash Baral. The film is produced by Nischal Basnet and Swastima Khadka under the banner of Black Horse Pictures and Meghauli Films. The film stars the producer duo, Nischal Basnet and Swastima Khadka in lead roles alongside Basundhara Bhusal, Bijay Baral, Rakshya Thapa, Simran Khadka as supporting cast.

The film released across the country on October 3, 2024 in Nepal.

== Synopsis ==
The film is a social drama film that follows the story of traditional Nepali family. It is the story of father struggling to find perfect groom for his daughter while his daughter struggles to find perfect love.

== Cast ==
- Nischal Basnet
- Swastima Khadka
- Bijay Baral
- Basundhara Bhusal
- Raskhya Thapa
- Lokendra Lekhak
- Siru Bista
- Simran Khadka

== Soundtrack ==
The background score is composed by Rohit Shakya.

No.	Title	Music	Singer	Length
1.	"Bihe Garne Ki Nagarne"	Kushal Pokhrel	Kushal Pokhrel	4:21
2.	"Udaayo Man"	Jayan J Waiba	Indrakala Rai	4:43
3.	"Chhadke Salam"	Jayan J Waiba	Kali Prasad Baskota, Babina Kirati, Nischal Basnet	5:07
4.	"Mayako Dosh"	Jayan J Waiba	Indrakala Rai	5:43
