= Pashupati Prasad =

Nepalese film

- Theatrical Poster
- Directed by: Dipendra K Khanal
- Screenplay by: Khagendra Lamichhane
- Produced by: Rojina Sitaula; Arjun Karki
- Starring: Khagendra Lamichhane; Barsha Siwakoti; Bipin Karki; Rabindra Singh Baniya; Sushil Pandey
- Cinematography: Niraj Kadel
- Edited by: Dirgha Khadka Sound Design, Film Mix: Uttam Neupane
- Production companies: Tukee Arts & Dipendra K. Khanal Production
- Release date: January 29, 2016 (Nepal)
- Country: Nepal
- Language: Nepali
- Budget: रु 0.4 Crore
- Box office: रु 5.5 Crore

Pashupati Prasad is a 2016 Nepali social satirical film directed by Dipendra K Khanal and written by Khagendra Lamichhane. The film stars Khagendra Lamichhane and Barsha Siwakoti in lead roles. The film features the struggle of a poor guy who lost his parents in an earthquake; he then travels to Kathmandu to earn his living and pay off his late father's debt.

The story is based on the struggle of poor people to pay off the debt. It was nominated for the Nepalese entry for the Best Foreign Language Film at the 89th Academy Awards, along with Ko Aafno and The Black Hen, where The Black Hen was selected for the entry. After a huge loss in his movie Vigilante 3D (The first Nepali 3D movie), Dipendra K Khanal went into depression and started visiting Pashupatinath temple. He saw many problems there and thought about releasing the movie related to all the issues he saw there. When he made the script and gave his friends to read, his friend told him that the movie would not get a good response, but he did not listen to his friend and started shooting the movie, and the film received an extremely positive response from the majority of viewers.

After Pashupati Prasad became one of the most successful movies in the history of Nepali cinema, the same team, with director Dipendra K Khanal and Khagendra Lamichhane, made a new movie based on the social drama Dhanapati, released in 2017.

== Cast ==
- Khagendra Lamichhane as Pashupati Prasad
  - Abhineet Chaulagai as young Pashupati Prasad
- Barsha Siwakoti as Bunu
- Prakash Ghimire as Mitbaa
- Rabindra Singh Baniya as Hanuman
- Bipin Karki as Bhasme Don
- Mishree Thapa as Aama

== Plot ==
The young Pashupati Prasad (Khagendra Lamicchane) is irate about his name, given by Meet Uncle (Praksh Ghimire), and teased by his friends. Pashupati's parents gave birth after visiting Pashupatinath Temple in Kathmandu.

After the earthquake of April 2015 and his parents' killed, the investor urges Pashupati to pay the loan taken and threatens to take the field. Pashupati, now grown and determined to repay his debts, moves to Kathmandu. He meets Meet Uncle, a ghate in Pashupatinath and a drunkard, who eventually takes Pashupati to his shelter.

Pashupati needs work to earn money, and the Bhasme Don (Bipin Karki) doesn't want him to interfere in daily tasks. Bhasme bullies the innocent Pashupati but is afraid of Hanuman Ji (Rabindra Singh Baniya). Pashupati befriends Hanuman Ji, who earns money by taking photographs with visitors. Similarly, due to his helpful nature, he meets Aama, who was abandoned by her children and lives in Briddhashram. He respects her like his mother and even gives her his daily collection to save.

Pashupati sees Bunu (Barsha Siwakoti) during a photograph session with Hanuman Ji and falls in love.

Pashupati is recruited by a local dealer and sent again to collect wood with Bhasme Don. Bhasme tries to find a way to kick out Pashupati and can convince him while making marijuana with the dealer. Pashupati is again recruited to sell sarees, which pays him a little more than his previous assignments.

During the course, he meets a graduate who sells street food. Pashupati also wants to sell street food and asks if he can get a stall. He then goes to take money from his savings only to find that Meet Uncle has used it for liquor. He is frustrated and goes to the banks of the Bagmati. At the river, he finds a deceased person's gold ring and tries to sell it. But the shopkeepers don't want to take it as he has no proof of ownership. Some try to give him a nominal amount of cash, but he refuses. The shopkeeper whom he meets at the beginning of the film then accuses him of theft, and the mob kills him.

In the climax of the scene, Hanuman Ji is revealed to be a government officer who had embezzled a huge amount of money. Aama waits for her adopted son, Pashupati, to give her belongings instead of her son. Bunu, not knowing of his untimely death, waits desperately for the cheerful and hardworking guy. Even Bhasme Don feels sorry for Pashupati. Meet Uncle pays the debt to the investor in the village.

== Reception ==
The film opened with positive reviews. As per IMDb, the film received 8.9 stars out of 10. The Himalayan Times wrote in its review: With a gripping storyline, the movie keeps you glued to your seat. The portrayal of the recent earthquake and its effects on a man's life has been done brilliantly.

== Awards ==
Pashupati Prasad was one of the critically acclaimed movies of 2016. The film bagged many awards, including Best Story, Best Director, and Best Film.

List of awards and nominations
Ceremony	Category	Recipient	Result
Moviemandu Movie Person of the year	Movie Person of the year	Pashupati Prasad	Won
FAAN awards	Best film	Dipendra Khanal	Won
FAAN awards	Best Story	Dipendra K Khanal	Won
FAAN awards	Best Editor	Dirgha Khadka	Nominated
FAAN awards	Best Character actor	Prakash Ghimire	Nominated
FAAN awards	Best New actress	Barsha Siwakoti	Nominated
FAAN awards	Best Director	Dipendra K Khanal	Won
FAAN awards	Best Actor	Khagendra Lamichhane	Nominated
National Film Awards 2016	Best film	Tukee Arts & Dipendra K. Khanal Production	Won
National Film Awards 2016	Best writer	Khagendra Lamichhane	Won
National Film Awards 2016	Best Director	Dipendra K Khanal	Won
8th Dcine Awards 2016	Best background music	Jayson Kunwar	Nominated
8th Dcine Awards 2016	Best screenplay	Khagendra Lamichhane	Won
8th Dcine Awards 2016	Best story	Dipendra K Khanal	Nominated
8th Dcine Awards 2016	Best villain	Bipin Karki	Won
8th Dcine Awards 2016	Best editor	Dirgha Khadka	Nominated
8th Dcine Awards 2016	Best director	Dipendra K Khanal	Won
8th Dcine Awards 2016	Best Film	Tukee arts	Nominated
8th Dcine Awards 2016	Most Popular Film	Pashupati Prasad	Won
LG Film Awards	Best Film	Tukee Arts	Won
