= Loot (2012 film) =

2012 Nepali film by Nischal Basnet

- Theatrical release poster
- Directed by: Nischal Basnet
- Screenplay by: Nischal Basnet
- Produced by: Madhav Wagle; Narendra Maharjan
- Starring: Saugat Malla; Karma Shakya; Dayahang Rai; Reecha Sharma; Prateek Raj Neupane; Sushil Raj Pandey
- Cinematography: Purushottam Pradhan
- Edited by: Surendra Poudel Sound Design, Film Mix: Uttam Neupane
- Production companies: Princess Movies; Black Horse Pictures
- Release date: 13 January 2012 (Nepal)
- Running time: 121 minutes
- Country: Nepal
- Language: Nepali
- Budget: रु 0.5–0.7 million
- Box office: रु 52 million

Loot (Nepali: लूट) is a 2012 Nepali crime thriller film that was directed and written by Nischal Basnet as his debut. The film received critical acclaim with praise directed towards the performances of the cast, the screenplay, twists, climax and the direction of Nischal Basnet. The film, and especially Saugat Malla's character Haku Kale, developed a cult following in Nepali cinema. With an estimated budget of 5,000,000 to 7,000,000 Nepalese rupees (NPR), Loot grossed 52 million NPR at the box office and went on to become the highest grossing Nepali movie of all time, breaking several records at the box office. It is credited for bringing realism to Nepali cinema rather than focusing on larger than life routine masala Nepali film and brought a new wave of Cinema in Nepal. The film is also credited for reviving the box office in Nepal, attracting Nepali youth audience who at that time were attracted to Hollywood and Bollywood cinema moreso than routine Nepali cinema. The film won three National Film Awards.

The film was produced by Madhav Wagle and Narendra Maharjan with Princess Movies and Black Horse Pictures. The film features an ensemble cast including Saugat Malla, Dayahang Rai, Karma Shakya, Prateek Raj Neupane, Sushil Raj Pandey, Reecha Sharma, Srijana Subba, Praveen Khatiwada and Sushma Karki. In the film, Haku Kale (Saugat Malla) suffers from poverty and, inspired by a recent successful bank robbery, plans to rob a bank in Kathmandu alongside four other criminals. A sequel, Loot 2 was released in 2017.

== Plot ==
In Kathmandu, Nepal, Haku Kale lives in poverty and has an idea to get himself out of it. Inspired by a recent successful bank robbery, he plans to rob a bank within five months. He searches for accomplices who are in need of money and recruits gambler Naresh, drug dealer Khatri, and unemployed Golfe and Pandey.

The group plan their bank robbery and decide what tasks each person will perform. The gang will go to the bank on three motorcycles; after arriving, Khatri will change the number plates. Haku will already be inside the bank; he will reconnoitre the bank then indicate to the others when it is safe to proceed. Golfe will deal with guards of the bank, Khatri and Pandey will get customers and employees inside a room, Naresh will force the bank manager to open the bank vault, then Khatri and Pandey will steal the money. The gang will then flee the bank.

On the day of the robbery, the gang meet for the last time and tell each other that they will no longer know each other, whether or not the raid is successful. They rob the bank but the police arrive before they can escape. The police capture four members of the gang excluding Haku Kale, who runs away to another gang with whom he was also planning to rob the bank. Haku decides to flee with the money and the film ends with flashbacks as Haku remembers his plan.

== Cast ==
- Saugat Malla as Haku Kale
- Karma Shakya as Naresh/Nare
- Dayahang Rai as Gopal/Gofley
- Reecha Sharma as Ayesha
- Prateek Raj Neupane as Khatri
- Sushil Raj Pandey as Pandey
- Srijana Subba as Putali; Haku Kale's wife
- Praween Khatiwada as Mane
- Sushma Karki Special appearance in the song "Udhreko Choli"
- Bipin Karki (cameo)

== Production ==
Before making Loot, Nischal Basnet said; "I wanted to make a film that I would want to watch, a film that I would enjoy. Not a film that audiences at large automatically expect from Nepali filmmakers." Basnet also said he never thought of a future for the film and he just wanted to make "a film about bank robbery".

Initially, Loot was written as a short film and was only intended to be 40 minutes long. When Basnet and his colleagues collected 5 to 700,000 of Nepali rupees for a short feature, he said; "We basically knew that we weren't getting anything back if we made a short movie so we started asking ourselves why not develop it into a feature length?" The team decided to turn the film into a feature film. He later gave the script to Saugat Malla and Karma Shakya, who improvised it.

While writing the script for Loot, Nischal Basnet based lead character Haku Kale on himself. He asked himself: "What would I do if I was in a situation like this?" In an interview, Basnet said Saugat Malla "brought the extra flavor and turned Kale into a Newari character plus added the name Haku (in production known as 'Kale')". When the script was being evaluated, the team wondered whether the film would ever be made because "history showed that experiments weren't taken kindly by the Nepali audience".

In an interview, the film director Nischal Basnet said lead actor Dayahang Rai was not on his checklist and but that Rai had already heard about his film, so Basnet decided to approach him. Basnet did not know he "was supposed to talk about remuneration". Dayahang Rai told Basnet; "Give me rupee[s] for working in the film, anything more than that will be a bonus"; that day, Basnet was "truly ready to make a film". The character Rai was portraying is fat; every time the director and Rai met, he was "welcomed with a feast of noodles and eggs". Basnet was surprised by how Rai "gets into the character and comes off it. I could see his belly bulging. He fattened himself in almost no time!".

Later, Saugat Malla was chosen to star in the film. Malla improvised the character and changed his name from "Kale" to "Haku Kale" but it took a while for Basnet to approve the name change. Bijaya Adhikari of the Living wrote; "a nickname that today generates an imagery of one of the most memorable characters in modern Nepali cinema". Whenever Basnet sent page of ideas to both Dayahang Rai, and Malla, Rai made a "few touch-ups here and there" but Malla was "brutal" with the ideas. Malla said when he sent a page of ideas but when he got them back "it would be more than what I [Basnet] would have sent him". When the cinematographer Purushottam Pradhan was engaged for the project, things "took a whole new turn". He suggested to Basnet; "Don't confine yourself ... Think big. People aren't going to watch this film in a 17-inch screen. Imagine a theater screen."

Basnet wanted the film to be filmed in a guerilla style format but later it "exploded into a full-length film-making process backed up by professionals standing by at all levels". Basnet wanted to shoot Loot at locations that had never been filmed before. The production crew searched for "the dirt, the puddles, the dust and the gore of the city that is originally hidden from day-to-day life" because Basnet felt those locations would "do justice to the script". The crew faced several problems when filming in tall buildings. The crew had to "stand on ledges without any safety equipment while handling the camera" and Basnet also said they were very nervous while filming and at the same time they "were trying hard not to look down".

Surendra Poudel, the film's editor, had "doubts about the ending of the film"; he said: "Will the 'nine minutes' of the film's ending put people on the edge of their seats? Can this mystery work?" Basnet replied with "If there is enough built-up for the story, people will stay back to understand the film". Load shedding was a major problem during the post-production phase. The power inverter only worked for about two to three hours, which "wasn't enough to edit and render the movie".

== Release ==
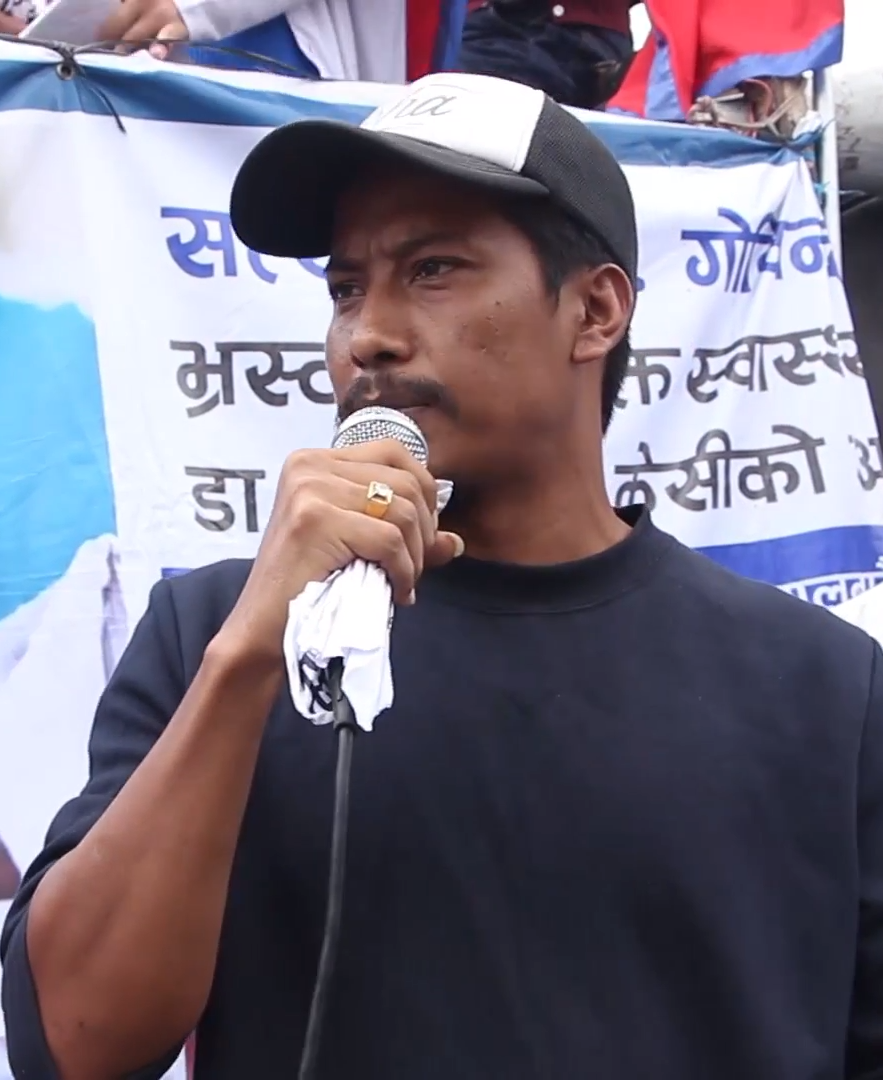
Nischal Basnet wrote and directed the film.

Loot was released on 13 January 2012 throughout Nepal, where it grossed 52 million NPR (approximately $453,000 in 2019). The film was screened in theatres for more than 100 days. Sophia Pandey of the Nepali Times criticized the script of Loot for not being "entirely original and more than a little derivative", and she added; "We must concentrate on writing stories that truly matter, and develop characters with more moral and psychological complexity". Nirajan Pudasaini of The Rising Nepal wrote that Loot changed "people's perception about Nepali cinemas". Raunak Niroula of XNepali praised Saugat Malla's performance in the film; he wrote, "Malla's performance can be considered the best". Avijit Thapa of My Republica said the film changed "the status of Nepali cinema". Xinhua News Agency said, "[the film] was appreciated for its storyline, natural dialogues and superb cinematography."

Tsering Rhitar Sherpa speaking with Friday Weekly said; "The bold use of images and narrative techniques in films like "Loot" ... show the huge leap that the Nepali cinema has taken." Swapnil Acharya said Loot did not change anything, saying it "was a spark and that spark quickly faded away". Gokarna Gautam of Nepali Times said of the success of the film; "The film became an overnight hit and propelled [Dayahang] Rai into stardom. Every Nepali producer wanted to cast him in their films."

The film has since developed a cult following. Director Nischal Basnet said; "happiness and the relief that the success of Loot brought is just unexplainable." Anand Nepal of Entertainment Magazine noted the film "established Sushma [Karki] in the film industry" and added that her appearance in "Udhreko Choli" made her a celebrity. In a cover story of Saugat Malla, The Nepali Man, wrote that after his performance in Loot, "people really started noticing him" and that "Loot was a culmination of talented people and ideas weaved into a tremendous film that set a benchmark amongst Nepali movies". Naman Ramachandran writing for Variety said the film "was a big hit among Nepalese youth".

== Accolades ==
At the 2012 National Film Awards, Malla won Best Actor in a Leading Role, Nischal Basnet won Best Debut Director, and Purusottam Pradhan won Best Cinematographer.

List of accolades received by Loot
Award	Year	Category	Recipient(s)	Result	Ref(s).
National Film Awards	2012	Best Actor in a Leading Role (Male)	Saugat Malla	Won	
National Film Awards	2012	Best Debut Director	Nischal Basnet	Won	
National Film Awards	2012	Best Cinematographer	Purusottam Pradhan	Won	
