= Gajalu =

- Directed by: Hem Raj BC
- Produced by: Rohit Adhikari / Hem Raj BC
- Starring: Shristi Shrestha, Anmol K.C.
- Edited by: Rohhan Rye
- Music by: Songs: Kali Prasad Baskota; Hercules Basnet; Background Scores: Shailesh Shrestha; Sound Design, Mixing: Uttam Neupane
- Production companies: Rohit Adhikar Films, BC Motion Pictures
- Release date: 10 June 2016
- Running time: 137 min
- Country: Nepal
- Language: Nepali
- Budget: 1 crores
- Box office: 4.9 crores

Gajalu (Nepali: गाँजलु) is a Nepali movie that depicts the life of living goddess Kumari after her retirement. Shristi Shrestha plays the role of Sujata Shakya, a former Kumari. The movie is about her friendship with her six friends who happen to change her life. This movie is partly inspired by novel named Half Girlfriend by Chetan Bhagat.

The film was produced by Rohit Adhikari Films in association with BC Motion Pictures. The screenplay of the movie was written by Hem Raj BC. and the music was composed by Hercules Basnet, Kali Parsad Baskot and Jaing. The movie was released on जेठ २८, २०७३/ June 10, 2016.

Gajalu is the story of a former Kumari who figures her way out of the traditional dogmas after meeting a group of friends, and starts living an independent life then after. The movie met with positive reviews and is considered to be best film of Anmol K.C.

== Cast ==
- Shristi Shrestha as Sujata Shakya/Kumari
- Anmol K.C. as Aarav
- Salon Basnet as Tanke
- Gaurav Pahari as Om
- Menuka Pradhan, as Prakriti/sister of Aarav
- Rohhan Rai as Rohhan
- Gauri Malla

== Crew ==
The crew included Rajendra Moktan (colourist), Uttam Neupane Sound designer, Shailesh Shrestha (Background score), Shailendra Dhoj Karki (DOP), Surendra Poudel (editor), Keshav Thapa (choreographer), Saswot Man Shrestha (publicity designer), Mahesh Baral (associate), Krishna Shrestha (visual effects).

== Track listing ==
No.	Title	Lyrics	Music	Singer(s)	Length
1.	"Timi Aayou"	Hercules Basnet	Hercules Basnet	Hercules Basnet	4:08
2.	"Muskuraunu ko katha"	Kali Prasad Baskota, Sabin Ektare	Kali Prasad Baskota	Suman Gurung	3:51
3.	"Rang Ranja"	Jain j	Jain j	Siwani Moktan	3:48
4.	"Zindagiko yehi ta nasha ho"	Hercules Basnet	Hercules Basnet	Hercules Basnet, Nikita Thapa	4:27
Total length:					22:18

== International Release ==
Gajalu was screened in Cineworld, UK . This is the first time in history for Nepalese film to be screened in Cineworld, second largest cinema operator in Europe.
