= Jai Bhole =

- Directed by: Ashok Sharma
- Written by: Khagendra Lamichhane
- Produced by: Kiran Sharma, Kriti Sharma, Ankit Sharma
- Starring: Khagendra Lamichhane; Saugat Malla; Swastima Khadka
- Edited by: Raju Dhungana
- Release date: 16 October 2018 (Nepal)
- Running time: 103 Minute
- Country: Nepal
- Language: Nepali

Jai Bhole (Nepali: जय भोले) is 2018 Nepalese drama romance film, directed by Ashok Sharma and written by Khagendra Lamichhane. The film is produced by Kiran Sharma, Kriti Sharma, and Ankit Sharma under the banner of AA Group of Companies. The film stars Saugat Malla, Khagendra Lamichhane, Swastima Khadka, Buddhi Tamang, and Salon Basnet in the lead roles.

== Cast ==
- Khagendra Lamichhane as Jai
- Saugat Malla as Bhole
- Swastima Khadka as Nisha
- Salon Basnet as Shamsher
- Buddhi Tamang as Bruce Lee (a parody of Bruce Lee)
- Rajaram Paudel as Jai's father

== Soundtrack ==
No.	Title	Lyrics	Music	Singer(s)	Length
1.	"Umliyo Bhane Pokhincha"	Rajan Raj Siwakoti	Rajan Raj Siwakoti	Rajan Raj Shiwakoti, Melina Rai	5:04
