= Mukun Bhusal =

Nepalese film actor

- मुकुन भुषाल
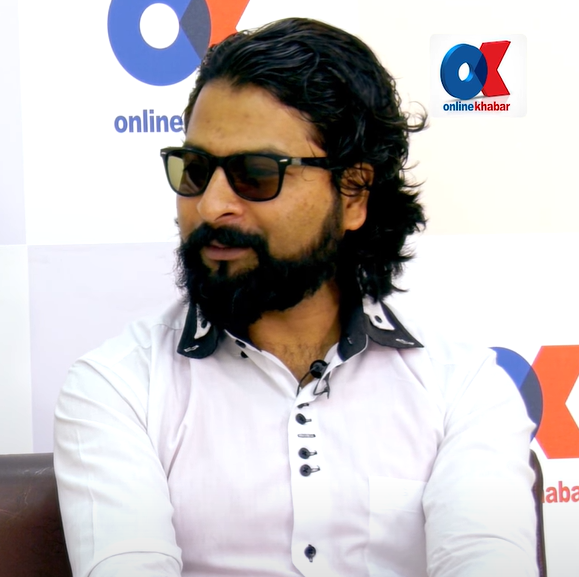
- Bhusal in 2019
- Born: Mukunda Bhusal; Nepal
- Education: Marwah Studios (Shobhit University)
- Occupation: Actor
- Years active: 2019–present

Mukun Bhusal (Nepali: मुकुन भुषाल) is a Nepalese actor known for his work in Nepali cinema. He made his feature film debut in 2019 with Bulbul. Prior to his feature film debut, he had appeared in a number of short films.

== Personal life ==
Mukun Bhusal received his acting degree from Marwah Studios, Noida, a division of Shobhit University, in 2018.

== Career ==
Bhusal made his debut with the critically acclaimed Bulbul, which was released in 2019, where he starred opposite Swastima Khadka. The film was Nepal's entry for the 92nd Academy Awards' Best International Feature Film category, but it did not receive a nomination.

In 2022, he starred in Jhingedaau, which was commercially successful. In 2023, he starred in Ganapati, and Aicho Paicho.

== Filmography ==
Key
| † | Denotes films that have not yet been released |

| Year | Film | Role | Notes | Ref(s) |
|---|---|---|---|---|
| 2019 | Bulbul | Chopendra | | |
| 2022 | Jhingedaau | Ramkant | | |
| 2023 | Ganapati | Ganapati | | |
| 2023 | Aicho Paicho | Dilendra | | |
| 2024 | Upahaar | Madan | | |
| 2024 | Purna Bahadur Ko Sarangi | Bire | | |
| TBA | Bichhed † | TBA | Post-production | |
| TBA | Bijuli Chapter 1 † | TBA | | |

== Awards ==
| Year | Award | Category | Nominated work | Result | Ref(s) |
|---|---|---|---|---|---|
| 2020 | Nepal International Film Festival | Jury Choice Best Actor | Bulbul | Won | |
| 2023 | Nepal Rural Film Festival | Best Actor | Jhingedaau | Won | |
| 2023 | Nepal Rural Film Festival | Best Feature Film | Jhingedaau | Won | |
