= Udhreko Choli =

Song by Indira Joshi and Nischal Basnet

from the album Loot (original soundtrack)
- Language: Nepali
- Published: 2012
- Recorded: 2010
- Genre: Pop, Filmi, Latin pop
- Songwriter: Nischal Basnet
- Composer: Roshan Thapa

Udhreko Choli is a Nepali item song from the movie Loot. It was sung by Indira Joshi and Nischal Basnet and composed by Roshan Thapa. Basnet directed the movie. Sushma Karki is featured in the video of this song. "Udhreko Choli" had been popular among youth due to its crude lyrics. Though the song was modeled on Bollywood item songs, it is very Nepali because of its pure lyrics that were instrumental in making this song popular all over Nepal.
