= Loot 2 =

Loot
- Theatrical release poster.
- Directed by: Nischal Basnet
- Produced by: Madhav Wagle; Narendra Maharjan
- Starring: Saugat Malla; Dayahang Rai; Karma Shakya; Bipin Karki; Praween Khatiwada; Reecha Sharma; Alisha Rai; Sound Design, Film Mix: Uttam Neupane
- Cinematography: Purushootam pradhan
- Edited by: Surendra Poudel
- Music by: Songs: Kali Prasad Baskota; Roshan Thapa; Background Scores: Shailesh Shrestha; Rohit Shakya
- Production companies: Princess Movies; Black Horse Pictures Pvt Ltd
- Release date: 24 February 2017 (Nepal)
- Country: Nepal
- Language: Nepali
- Budget: रु 1.6 Crore
- Box office: रु 10.6 Crore

Loot 2 is a Nepali film directed by Nischal Basnet and produced by Madhav Wagle. The sequel of the Nepali blockbuster film Loot (2012), it was released on 24 February 2017, garnering रू15 million on its opening day, which is one of the biggest openings in Nepali film history. By the end of its fifth day in theaters, it successfully earned over रू105 Million.

== Plot ==
Loot ended with Haku Kale plotting against his four team members to take over entire robbed money. The four gang members, who were framed for the bank robbery, now escape from the prison and want to take revenge against Haku Kale for everything that happened to them. Now that Haku Kale has one of the biggest crime lords of the city, the entire plot of movie revolves around the four members trying to make him pay for what he did.

== Cast ==
- Saugat Malla as Haku Kale:
  A gangster who operates a black market for Petroleum oil when Nepal had a Petroleum oil shortage after a shocking earthquake that occurred in 2015. He is also a thief who robs banks with his team Mane, Pittal, and Ghusghuse. Haku Kale once made a plan to rob a bank with Gofley, Nare, Khatri, and Pandey but betrays them and robs the bank with Mane, Pittal, and Ghusghuse. He is also the main antagonist of this film series.
- Dayahang Rai as Gopal "Gofley" Gurung:
  Gopal Gurung is most commonly known as Gofley. A gangster also was involved in the bank robbery case. He was involved in a bank robbery plan with Haku Kale but was betrayed at the last moment and was imprisoned for 3 years, he has anger for revenge with Haku Kale.
- Karma Shakya as Naresh "Nare" Pradhan:
  Naresh Pradhan is most commonly known as Nare. A gangster also involved in the bank robbery case and was a Bouncer and Gambler before he meets Haku Kale. He was also involved in Haku Kale's plan for bank robbery was got betrayed at the last moment, was arrested for 3 years, and has anger for revenge with Haku Kale.
- Bipin Karki as Pittal:
  A gangster who works for Haku Kale and Maney also his nephew. He was involved in the Loot case in which Nare, Gofley, Pandey, and Khatri got betrayed. He's an important comedy character in this film series. He gets to the hand of Nare, Gofley, Khatri, and Pandey and gets beaten up by them.
- Praween Khatiwada as Maney:
  A gangster who works for Haku Kale. He is the nephew of Pittal. He was involved in the Loot case in which Nare, Gofley, Pandey, and Khatri got betrayed. He also dates Sundari who was pretending to be his love interest Gofley. He was also one of the masterminds behind this robbery.
- Reecha Sharma as Aysha:
  She is the love interest of Pandey who got betrayed by Haku Kale and got into jail for 3 years. She also loved him blindly but later knew he was going to rob a bank so she moved ahead without Pandey and married another guy.
- Srijana Subba as Putali:
  She is married to Haku Kale since the beginning of the Loot series. She is a frustrated mother who is always tensed about her child and the future of her family although she accepts the looted money by Haku Kale.
- Kameshor Chaurasiya as Baam:
  A friend of Gofley and Pandey who works at People's Bank and currently joined Haku Kale's team. And betrayed Gofley, Nare, Pandey, and Khatri by giving them a fake loot plan and keeping the main silent loot plan with themselves. This plan was also organized by Haku Kale.
- Sushil Raj Pandey as Jagat Pandey:
  Jagat Pandey is most commonly known as Pandey. A gangster also was involved in the bank robbery case. He was involved in a bank robbery plan with Haku Kale but was betrayed at the last moment and was imprisoned for 3 years, he has anger for revenge with Haku Kale.
- Prateek Raj Neupane as Deven Khatri:
  Deven Khatri is most commonly known as Khatri. A gangster also was involved in the bank robbery case. He was involved in a bank robbery plan with Haku Kale but was betrayed at the last moment and was imprisoned for 3 years, he has anger for revenge with Haku Kale.
- Sushil Upreti as Ghusghuse:
  A gangster who works for Haku Kale and Maney also his nephew. He was involved in the Loot case in which Nare, Gofley, Pandey, and Khatri were betrayed. Later, Nare, Gofley, Khatri, and Pandey thrash him.
- Alisha Rai as Sundari:
  A girl who works for Haku Kale. She is the love interest of Maney. She was involved in the Loot case in which Nare, Gofley, Pandey, and Khatri got disappointment. She also pretends to date Gofley to get information about them to Maney and Haku.
- Nischal Basnet Special appearance in a song "Thamel Bazar"

== Soundtrack ==
All tracks are written by Hercules Basnet, Nischal Basnet, Kali Prasad Baskota, Meena Niraula And Bhanubhakta Dhakal.

Track listing
No.	Title	Singer(s)	Length
1.	"Thamel Bazar"	Kali Prasad Baskota, Meena Niraula, Bhanu Bhakta Dhakal	5:01
2.	"Ghyampe"	Hercules Basnet, Nischal Basnet	4:37
Total length:			9:38

== Box office ==
Loot 2 collected NPR 15 million on the first day of release, the biggest opening in Nepali film history. By the end of day 5, it earned over NPR 55 million.
