= Dimag Kharab =

2023 Nepalese film directed by Nischal Basnet

- Theatrical release poster
- Nepali: दिमाग खराब
- Directed by: Nischal Basnet
- Screenplay by: Aakash Baral
- Produced by: Raunak Bikram Kandel
- Starring: Khagendra Lamichhane; Dayahang Rai; Swastima Khadka; Arpan Thapa; Bijay Baral
- Cinematography: Susan Prajapati
- Edited by: Nimesh Shrestha
- Production companies: Cinema Art Pvt. Ltd. Black Horse Pictures Pvt.Ltd.
- Release date: 10 November 2023 (Nepal)
- Country: Nepal
- Language: Nepali
- Budget: रू4.15 crore (equivalent to ₹0.00 or US$0.00 in 2026) - रू4.50 crore (equivalent to ₹0.00 or US$0.00 in 2026)
- Box office: रू10.67 crore (equivalent to ₹0.00 or US$0.00 in 2026)

Dimag Kharab (Nepali: दिमाग खराब) is a 2023 Nepali film directed by Nischal Basnet from a screenplay by Aakash Baral under the banner of Cinema Art Pvt.Ltd. It was produced by Raunak Bikram Kandel. Released on November 10, 2023, starring Khagendra Lamichhane, Dayahang Rai, Swastima Khadka, Arpan Thapa, and Bijay Baral. Prior to the release of the movie, the promotional song titled 'Jhamke Jhamaa Jham' with lead vocals Namrata Kafle and Sumit Khadka was released on October 2, 2023.

== Cast ==
- Khagendra Lamichhane
- Dayahang Rai
- Swastima Khadka
- Arpan Thapa
- Bijay Baral
- Suman Karki and more.

== Release ==
The film was released on November 10, 2023, in Nepal.
