= Sharmila Pandey =

Nepali Film producer

- शर्मिला पाण्डे
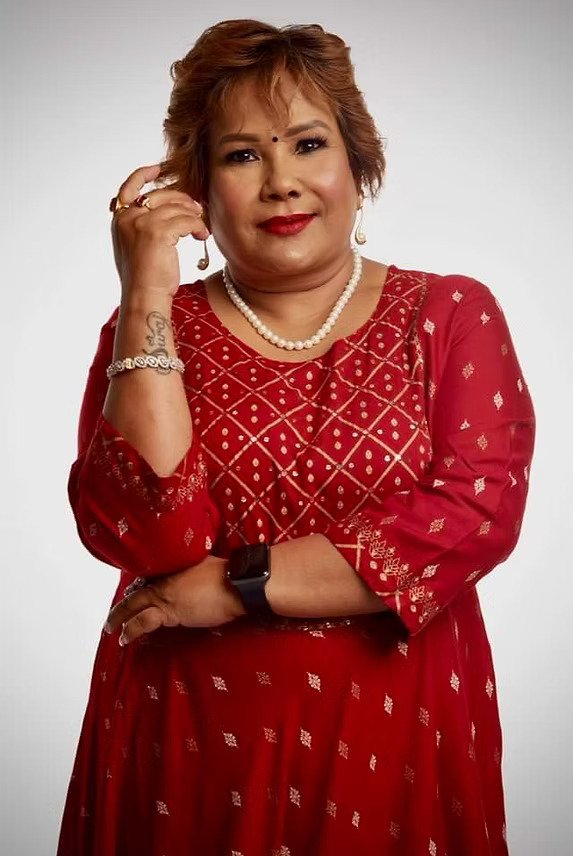
- Sharmila Pandey in 2024
- Born: Kathmandu, Nepal
- Other name: Sharmila Pandey Budhathoki
- Occupation: Film producer
- Years active: 2017–present
- Notable work: Love Love Love (2017), Changa Chet (2018), Ghar (2019), Aama (2020), Chiso Manchhe (2022), Parastree (2023)
- Website: Website

Sharmila Pandey (Nepali: शर्मिला पाण्डे) is a Nepali film producer known for the Nepali films Chiso Manchhe and Aama. She was born in Kathmandu Nepal.

== About ==
Pandey is a Nepali film producer known for her work in the Nepali film industry. She has several critically acclaimed and commercially successful films including Love Love Love (2017), Changa Chet (2018), Ghar (2019), Aama (2020), Chiso Manchhe (2022), and Parastree (2023). Pandey is recognized for her strong storytelling, focus on social issues, and contribution to the growth of contemporary Nepali cinema.

Her production works have received multiple national honors, including national film awards and box office awards. She has brought attention to diverse narratives and continues to play a significant role in the development of quality filmmaking in Nepal.

== Filmography ==
Sharmila Pandey filmography
Year	Title	Director	Genre	Notes
2017	Love Love Love	Dipendra K. Khanal	Romance, drama	Debut film as producer
2018	Changa Chet -2	Dipendra K. Khanal	Comedy, drama	Commercial success
2019	Ghar	Arpan Thapa	Horror, thriller	Psychological horror
2020	Aama	Dipendra K. Khanal	Drama	Critically acclaimed
2022	Chiso Manchhe	Dipendra K. Khanal	Drama	Social issue-based film
2023	Parastree	Suraj Pandey	Romantic drama	Focus on modern relationships

== Awards ==
Awards and honors received by Sharmila Pandey
S.N.	Award title	Category	Awarded by	Result	Ref.
1	National Film Award	Best Film – Aama	Government of Nepal	Won	
2	National Film Award	Special Film Award – Chiso Manchhe	Government of Nepal	Won	
