= FAAN Awards =

Award ceremony for Nepali movies

FAAN Awards is an award ceremony for Nepali movies organised by Film Artistes Association of Nepal (FAAN).
