= Jana Yuddha =

Jana Yuddha (Bengali: জনযুদ্ধ) was an organ of the Bengal Committee of the Communist Party of India. The first issue of the paper was published on May 1, 1942.
