= Dhanapati =

- Directed by: Dipendra K Khanal
- Story by: Khagendra Lamichhane; Sound Design, Film Mix: Uttam Neupane
- Produced by: Rojina Sitaula
- Starring: Khagendra Lamichhane; Surakshya Panta; Janak Bartaula; Kamal Devkota; Prakash Ghimire; Rabi Giri; Manish Niraula; Ashant Sharma; Harihar Sharma
- Cinematography: Dipendra K Khanal
- Edited by: Dirgha Khadka
- Music by: Songs: Aadha Sur; Background Scores: Shailesh Shrestha
- Production company: Tukee Arts
- Release date: July 7, 2017 (Nepal)
- Running time: 120 Mins
- Country: Nepal
- Language: Nepali

Dhanapati is a 2017 romantic and political movie directed by Dipendra K Khanal and written by Khagendra Lamichhane. The film stars Khagendra Lamichhane and Surakshya Panta. The film features a man named Dhanapati who struggles to get money to send his daughter to a good school. He therefore decides to go into politics to earn enough money.

== Plot ==
A man named Dhanapati who struggles to get money goes to a man named Rabi to find a job. Rabi then pulls Dhanapati into politics.

== Cast ==
- Khagendra Lamichhane as Dhanapati
- Surakshya Panta as Dhanapati's wife
- Janak Bartaula
- Kamal Devkota
- Prakash Ghimire
- Rabi Giri
- Manish Niraula
- Ashant Sharma
- Harihar Sharma

== Soundtrack ==
No.	Title	Singer(s)	Length
1.	"Sukha Dukha"	Aadha Sur, Sarada Adhikari	4:05
Total length:			4:05

== Critical reception ==
Dhanapati earned ₹10 million in the box office on its first day. Dhanapati received mixed reviews from the Nepalese audience.
