= Khagendra Lamichhane =

Nepalese film actor & writer

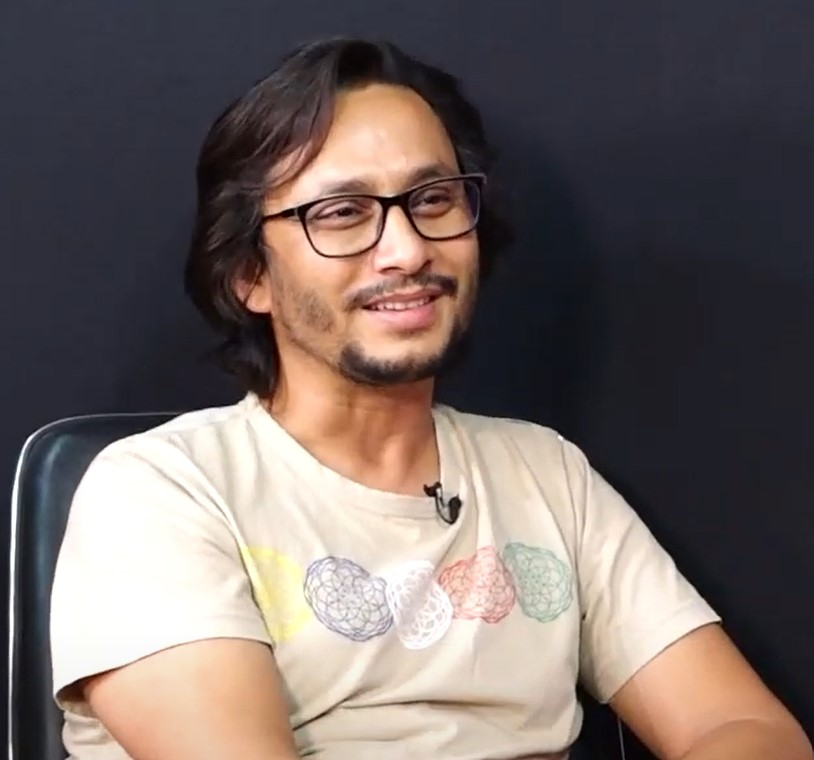
- Khagendra Lamichhane (2022)
- Born: Putali Bazar, Syangja, Nepal
- Education: Tribhuvan University
- Occupations: Actor, writer and director
- Years active: 2013–present
- Notable work: Talakjung vs Tulke (feature film); Pashupati Prasad (feature film)
- Spouse: Rojina Sitaula

Khagendra Lamichhane is a Nepalese theater actor, writer, and director. He is best known for his work in movies such as Talakjung vs Tulke and Pashupati Prasad. He entered the acting field in 1999. He has directed five plays, mostly staged at national and international theatre festivals. As a writer, he has published three books.

He worked with BBC Media Action as an actor, writer, producer, and editor for the international award-winning drama Katha Mitho Sarangiko, and as an editor for its reconstruction radio drama Kathamaala. He worked with the British Council as a Drama Production Consultant. He serves as chairperson of Tukee Arts Pvt. Ltd.

== Early life ==
Khagendra Lamichhane was born in Syangja village. He and his friends participated in a Western District Drama contest, which interested him in drama. He shifted to Kathmandu to pursue his career in acting. He applied to Naachghar and started writing plays.

== Career ==
He wrote and starred in his first feature film, Talakjung vs Tulke, and is best known as Tulke in this film. He is also known as Pashupati from his movie character name, Pashupati Prasad Khakurel, in 2014.

He appeared in his play Dant Ko Dob. In 2012, he starred in Highway, which screened at the 62nd Berlin International Film Festival.

== Acting, movies, and dramas ==
Dhanapati (Nepali Feature Film, 2017)

Damaru ko Dandi Biyo (Nepali Feature Film, 2018)

Pashupati Prasad (Nepali Feature Film)

- Protagonist
- Written by Khagendra Lamichhane
- Directed by Dipendra K Khanal

Talakjung vs Tulke (Nepali Feature Film)

- Protagonist
- Written by Khagendra Lamichhane
- Directed by Nischal Basnet

Badhshala (Nepali Feature Film)

- Protagonist
- Written and directed by Manoj Pandit.

Maya Devika Sapana (Drama, 2010)

- Major role
- Written by Abhi Subedi
- Directed by Sunil Pokharel

Hajurbako Katha (Solo Drama, 2008)

- Acted, written, and directed by Khagendra Lamichhane

Peeda Geet (Solo Drama, 2007)

- Acted, written, and directed by Khagendra Lamichhane

Kaatro (Drama, 2004)

- Major role
- Written by Prem Chand
- Directed by Anup Baral

Sirumarani (Drama, 2003)

- Major role
- Written by Sarubhakta
- Directed by Anup Baral

== Direction, stage drama ==
Daantko Dob

- Produced by Tukee Arts, January 2016

AtalBahadurko Aatanka (Terror of AtalBhadur)

- Produced by Aarohan, Gurukul, November 2011

Paaniphoto (Photo Negative)

- Produced by Aarohan, Gurukul, February 2010

Hajurbako Katha (Story of Grandpa)

- Produced by Shatkon Arts Pvt. Ltd.
- Participated in the Kathmandu International Theatre Festival 2008

Peeda Geet (A song of Sorrows)

- Produced by Shatkon Arts Pvt. Ltd. (First phase 2007) /Tukee Arts Pvt. Ltd. (Second phase 2016)
- Participated in Edinburg fringe festival, Scotland, England, August 2009
- Participated in Patumthani International Theatre Festival, Thailand, February 2009
- Participated in the Aarohan National Theatre festival in April 2007

| Year | Film | Notes |
|---|---|---|
| 2013 | Badhsala | Debut movie |
| 2014 | Talakjung vs Tulke | Nominated from Nepal for Academy Awards |
| 2016 | Pashupati Prasad | Blockbuster |
| 2017 | Dhanapati | Hit |
| 2018 | Jai Bhole | Superhit |
| 2023 | Dimag Kharab | Upcoming movie |

== Awards and filmography ==
st of awards and nominations
| Year | Ceremony | Category | Work | Result |
|---|---|---|---|---|
| 2016 | 8th Dcine Awards 2016 | Best Screenplay | Pashupati Prasad | Won |
| 2016 | NFDC award 2072 | Best Screenplay | Pashupati Prasad | Won |
| 2016 | LG Award | Best Screenplay | Pashupati Prasad | Won |
