= Chiso Manchhe =

2022 Nepali film by Dipendra K. Khanal

- Theatrical release poster
- Nepali: चिसो मान्छे
- Directed by: Dipendra K. Khanal
- Written by: Dipendra K. Khanal
- Produced by: Sharmila Pandey
- Starring: Arpan Thapa; Swastima Khadka
- Cinematography: Dipendra K. Khanal
- Edited by: Dirgha Khadka
- Music by: Subash Bhusal
- Production company: D.S Digital Pvt. Ltd
- Distributed by: OSR Digital
- Release date: June 17, 2022 (Nepal)
- Country: Nepal
- Language: Nepali

Chiso Manchhe (Nepali: चिसो मान्छे; transl. Cold Man) is a 2022 Nepali film written and directed by Dipendra K. Khanal under the banner of D.S. Digital Pvt. Ltd. It was released on June 17, 2022, and it features Arpan Thapa and Swastima Khadka in the lead roles. The filming took place in Bajura and Kathmandu.

== Synopsis ==
When a Nepalese worker dies in Qatar, his wife Puspa (Swastima Khadka) and father (Desh Bhakta Khanal) travel to Kathmandu to retrieve his body. They meet a driver, Ram (Arpan Thapa) who offers to take them back to their hometown. The plot revolves around Puspa, who has spent her entire life in rural Nepal. Her journey from the city back home is the subject of the narrative.

== Cast ==
- Swastima Khadka as Puspa
- Arpan Thapa as Ram
- Desh Bhakta Khanal as Father
- Aashant Sharma
- Prabhakar Neupane
- Ram Babu Regmi

== Soundtrack ==
No.	Title	Lyrics	Music	Singer(s)	Length
1.	"Jiban Batoma"	Sahadev Aryal and Harka Saud	Subash Bhusal	Nikhita Thapa	6:56
Total length:					6:56

== Reception ==
Chiso Manchhe received mixed but mostly positive reviews from critics. Most critics acclaimed the film, though some felt it lacked redeeming qualities.

Devendra Bhattarai from Kantipur said: "Chiso Manchhe has the feel of pure Nepali soil. It is difficult to say how much the director Dipendra will earn from this film, which does not follow the formula. However, it is necessary for others to learn this blueprint of a comprehensive story that tries to weave such an original story."

Sukrit Nepal from Gorkhapatra praised the film's overall plot as well as the regional accents used by Swastima Khadka and Desh Bhakta Khanal. Their characters' costumes are also recognized for being relevant.

Annapurna Post has written: "The plot revolves around the character of Puspa, and there is no real plot, and the story does not progress as it should. The film ends while the audience is expecting something good."
