= Uttam Neupane =

Nepali sound mixer

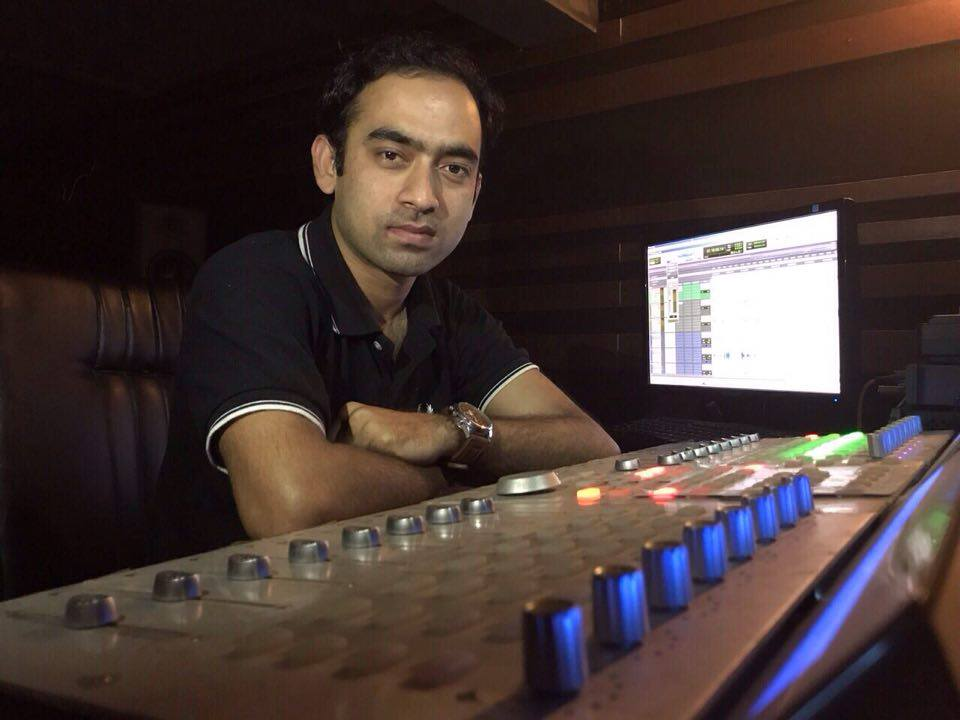
- Uttam Neupane at Linewood audio post work
- Born: Surya Kumar Neupane; February 10, 1987 (age 39); Rautahat, Nepal
- Other name: Uttam Neupane
- Occupations: Sound mixer, Sound designer
- Years active: 2009–present
- Awards: National Film Awards (Nepal) for Best sound mixing

Surya Kumar Neupane (born 1987) known professionally as Uttam Neupane, is a Nepali sound mixer. He is the recipient of the 5th National Film Award of Nepal for Best Sound mixing for the feature film Mero Euta Saathi Chha. Two films he did sound-mixing for, Bulbul and Talakjung vs Tulke, were Nepal's official entries for the 92nd and 88th Academy Awards respectively.

== Career ==
He started his career as recordist under the supervision of ace sound engineer Deep Tuladhar and Iman Bikram Shah at Sapthak and BMI Records. By the time of 2008 he became independent Sound designer & Re-recording mixer.

Since then he is doing sound design, production sound recording, re-recording mixing for Nepali, British, French, German, Indian, Bangladeshi Kurdistani films. In 2022 he mixed A Mero Hajur 4 which is the first film in Nepal that is mixed in Dolby Atmos. He also did the sound design and mixed south Asia's first DTS:X immersive sound format for the feature film Pujar Sarki. He is sound designer alumni of Busan International Film Festival-Asian film academy and Berlin international Film festival Berlinale Talent Campus in 2023 & 2024 respectively. He is member at the Cinema Audio Society

== Filmography ==
Year	Movie	Director	Country	Credit
2026	Private Property	Deepak Rauniyar	USA,France,Nepal	Re-recording mixer, Sound Designer
2026	Going Home	Shokir Kholikov	Kazakhstan	Re-recording mixer, Sound Designer
2026	Mafia	Dastan Madalbekov	Kyrgyzstan	Re-recording mixer, Sound Designer
2026	Gazelle	Saman Hosseinpuor	Iran	Re-recording mixer, Sound Designer
2025	Everythingness	Paul Macly	Russia	Re-recording mixer, Sound Designer
2025	Kama	Veemsen Lama	United Kingdom	Re-recording mixer, Sound Designer
2025	Sand City	Mahde Hasan	Bangladesh	Re-recording mixer
2024	Pooja, Sir	Deepak Rauniyar	Nepal	Sound editor
2024	Purna Bahadur Ko Sarangi	Saroj Poudel	Nepal	Re-recording Mixer, Sound Designer
2024	Pujar Sarki	Dinesh Raut	Nepal	Re-recording Mixer, Sound Designer
2023	Transient Happiness	Sina Muhammed	Iraqi Kurdistan	Sound designer, Re-recording Mixer
2023	The Summit of the Gods (film)	Patrick Imbert	France	Recording engineer
2023	Vidyapeeth	Gajendra Ahire	India	Re-recording mixer
2019	Bulbul (2019 film)	Binod Poudel	Nepal	Re-recording Mixer, Sound Designer
2018	A Mero Hajur 2	Jharna Thapa	Nepal	Re-recording Mixer, Sound Designer
2018	KRI	Surendra Poudel	Nepal	Re-recording Mixer, Sound Designer
2017	Chapali Height-2	Dipendra k khanal	Nepal	Re-recording Mixer, Sound Designer
2016	Jerryy	Hem Raj BC	Nepal	Re-recording Mixer, Sound Designer
2016	Dadyaa	Bibhusan Basnet	Nepal	Re-recording Mixer, Sound Designer
2016	Bijuli Machine	Navin Awal	Nepal	Re-recording Mixer, Sound Designer
2016	Dirty Games	Benjamin Best	Germany	Sound Recordist
2016	Gajalu	Hem Raj BC	Nepal	Re-recording Mixer, Sound Designer
2016	Gaatho	Suraj Bhusal	Nepal	Re-recording Mixer, Sound Designer
2016	Dhauli	Ghanashyam Lamichhane	Nepal	Re-recording Mixer, Sound Designer
2015	Talakjung vs Tulke	Nischal Basnet	Nepal	Re-recording Mixer, Sound Designer
2014	Mukhauta	Arpan Thapa	Nepal	Re-recording Mixer, Sound Designer
2013	Kabaddi (2013 film)	Ram Babu Gurung	Nepal	Re-recording Mixer, Sound Designer
2013	Maun	Suraj Bhusal	Nepal	Re-recording Mixer, Sound Designer
2009	Mero Euta Saathi Chha	Sudarshan Thapa	Nepal	Re-recording Mixer, Sound Designer

== Awards and nominations ==
National Film Awards (Nepal)
Year	Movie	Language	Category	Result
2010	Mero Euta Saathi Chha	Nepali	Best Re-recording mixing	Won

Other Awards
Year	Award	Category	Nominated Film	Result
2012	Nefta Film Award	Best Sound Mixing	Loot (2012 film)	Won
2014	Kamana Film Award	Best Sound Design	Maun	Won
2014	Box Office Film Award	Best Sound Mixing	Dhanda	Won
2015	Nefta Film Award	Best Sound Mixing	Jerryy	Won
2015	Dcine Award	Best Sound Mixing	Kabaddi (2014 film)	Won
2015	NFDC National Film Awards	Best Re-recording mixing	Mukhauta	Won
2015	Box Office Film Award	Best Sound Mixing	Mukhauta	Won
2016	Nefta Film Award	Best Sound Mixing	Dhauli	Won
2016	Kamana Film Award	Best Sound Design	Gajalu	Won
