= Binod Poudel =

Nepali film director and writer

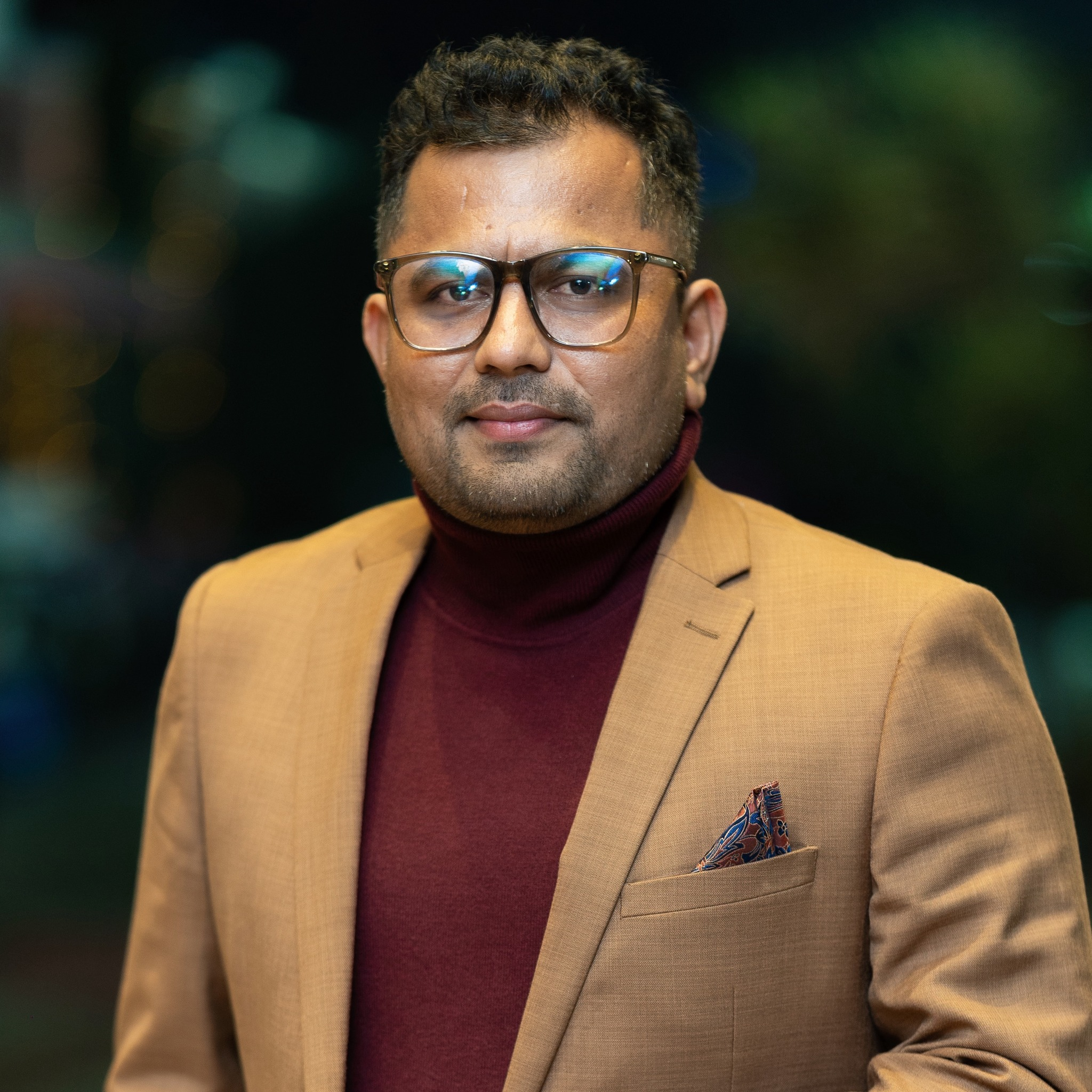

Binod Poudel is a Nepali film producer and founder of Seven Seas Cinema, best known for producing Purna Bahadur Ko Sarangi (2024), one of the highest-grossing films in Nepali cinema. His productions are noted for portraying the stories of marginalized communities and have received both critical and commercial acclaim.

== Career ==
Binod Poudel co-produced Purna Bahadur Ko Sarangi alongside Ramesh Chaulagain under the banner of Seven Seas Cinema. Directed by Saroj Poudel and written by Mahesh Dawadi, the film portrays the struggles of a father from the Gandharva community who dreams of educating his son. Released during Tihar on 31 October 2024, the film became one of the biggest hits in recent years.

- Abhimanyu Chapter 1 – a feature film inspired by themes of courage and sacrifice.

== Following the film’s success, Binod Poudel announced several projects including ==
- Purna Bahadur Ko Sarangi 2 – a sequel focusing on maternal sacrifice.
- Roll No. 1 – an upcoming youth drama directed by John Yojan.

== Filmography ==
Purna Bahadur Ko Sarangi became one of the highest-grossing Nepali films of all time and was praised for its portrayal of Gandharva culture and social realism.

== Awards and nominations ==
|- | 2081 | National Film Awards (Nepal) | Purna Bahadur Ko Sarangi | Best Actor | Won | |- | 2082 | International Nepali Film Awards | Purna Bahadur Ko Sarangi | Best Actor in a Leading Role (Male) | Won | |- | 2082 | International Nepali Film Awards | Purna Bahadur Ko Sarangi | Best Commercial Film | Won |

== See also ==
- Nepali cinema
