= Nischal Basnet =

Nepalese film director and actor

- निस्चल बस्नेत
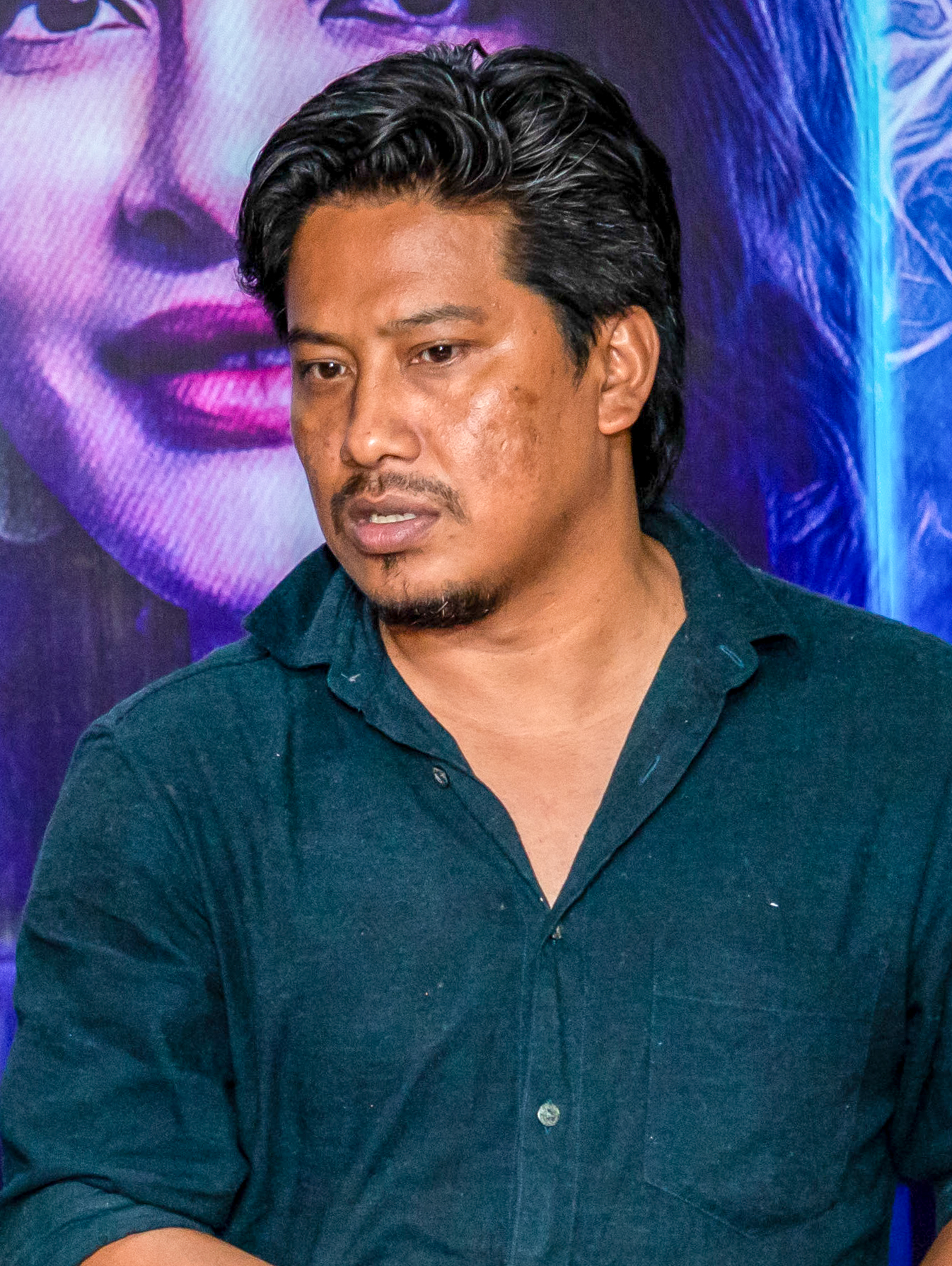
- Basnet in 2022
- Occupations: Actor; singer; producer
- Years active: 2012–present
- Known for: Loot; Loot 2
- Notable work: Loot (2012) · Talakjung vs Tulke (2014) · Loot 2 (2017) · Dui Rupaiyan (2017) · Ghamad Shere (2019)
- Spouse: Swastima Khadka (m. 2016)

Nischal Basnet (Nepali: निश्चल बस्नेत) is a Nepalese director, writer, actor, and playback singer who predominantly works in Nepali cinema. Considered as one of the best directors of Nepali cinema, he is widely acclaimed for "revolutionizing Nepali cinema" through his realistic, dark, and comic depiction of social problems prevalent in Nepal on the celluloid screen. Basnet has directed three feature films: Loot (2012), Talakjung vs Tulke (2014), and Loot 2 (2017). He has acted in the films Kabaddi (2014), Dui Rupaiyan (2017), Prasad (2018), Dimag Kharab (2023), and Behuli From Meghauli (2024)

Basnet debuted as a film director with the crime-thriller Loot, which became a "cult classic" and the highest-grossing Nepali film ever, which revived the condition of fate of Nepali film at the box office and changed the way Nepali films were made. After his successful debut as a director, he made his acting debut in Uma (2013). Basnet later directed the dark comedy Talakjung vs Tulke, which was critically acclaimed and commercially successful. The film was selected as the Nepalese entry for the Best Foreign Language Film at the 88th Academy Awards, but it was not nominated.

Basnet has received numerous awards, including the DCine Award for Best Debut Director and Best Cameo Role. He has also won a National Film Award for Best Director, and a nomination for Best Actor in a Negative Role at the Kamana Film Awards and Dcine Awards. Basnet has been married to Nepalese film actress Swastima Khadka since 2016.

== Career ==
=== 2012–2015: directorial and acting debut ===
Before making his directorial debut in 2012, Basnet said that he "didn't have the slightest clue that [he] would be getting into moviemaking" and added that he had not given any thought to it; after watching "mind-numbingly boring Nepali movies" in 2009, being disappointed that Nepalese films were "so terrible", he decided that he would "make a film within the next 5 years at any cost". Basnet read books and spent time on the internet to learn about filmmaking. The same year, he directed an unreleased short film titled Innocent, which criticises gun culture in Kathmandu. This film started struggling during its post-production: Basnet recalls that he "tried every way to save the movie but [they] weren't professionals" and that he "hopelessly [tried] to edit the movie and sync the sound on [his] laptop with [a] friend". Basnet has said that he does not think he will release the film, blaming his inexperience for its outcome.

Basnet made his directorial debut in 2012 with the critically acclaimed crime-thriller Loot. The film is set around Nepal's capital , Kathmandu, and the plot focuses on five young men who are in desperate need of money. The film features an ensemble cast and went on to win National Film Awards for Best Actor, Best Art Director, and Best Editing. Nischal Basnet contributed vocals as a playback singer to the film's original song, "Udhreko Choli", with Indira Joshi. Loot became a blockbuster at the box office, earning NPR 25.5 million Nepalese rupees (approximately US$218,000 in 2019). According to Republica, the film became a cult classic.

After making his directorial debut, Basnet acted in Uma (2013) and Kabaddi (2014). In Kabaddi, he appeared in a lead role as Bibek, who tries to abduct a gangster's daughter. His role in the film received acclaim.

In 2014, Basnet directed the dark comedy Talakjung vs Tulke, which is set during the Nepalese Civil War (1996–2006). The film was commercially successful and received critical acclaim, with Basnet winning a National Film Award for Best Director. Talakjung vs Tulke was selected as the Nepalese entry for the Best Foreign Language Film at the 88th Academy Awards, but it was not nominated; Basnet said that he felt good having his film be Nepal's Oscar representation. Of the selection, Basnet said: "I make my movie my way; others make movies their way. It is up to the panel of judges and how they see a movie." After Talakjung vs Tulke, Basnet starred in Kabaddi Kabaddi (2015), and made a special appearance in Zindagi Rocks (2015).

=== 2017–present: Loot 2 and Prasad ===
In 2017, Basnet directed the sequel to his debut Loot, titled Loot 2. After Loot became a blockbuster, Basnet had planned a sequel, but its pre-production of writing the plot had taken a long time. The film starred the original cast of Loot as well as new stars, including Bipin Karki and Alisha Rai. Like the original, Loot 2 became a blockbuster at the box office, grossing NPR 78.5 million. OnlineKhabar wrote that they "can sense director Basnet's genuine involvement in trying to elevate Loot 2 beyond the obvious comparison to its prequel. His characters have matured, not in a way warranting epiphanies, mind you, but subtly like the effect passing of time has on individuals". The same year, Basnet acted in the comedy-drama Dui Rupaiyan (2017). The plot concerns his character, Jureli, and Asif Shah's Dari searching for two rupees; he also sang "Talkyo Jawani" for the soundtrack of the film. This role was less well received by OnlineKhabar, with Sandhya Ghimire writing that the two leads "are informal to the point of being almost cringe-worthy". After Dui Rupaiyan, Basnet made an appearance in the romantic drama Prasad, playing Ramesh, a villainous character who interferes with the life of a couple who cannot conceive. He received praise from critics for this role, with OnlineKhabar saying that he "has contributed his distant gesture, cold facial expression, and thoughtfully articulated dialogues to his projection as a conspirator". In 2019, Basnet announced his upcoming film, Ghamad Shere. The film stars Basnet, Swastima Khadka, Sushma Niraula, and Gauri Malla.

In 2024, Basnet, alongside his wife, Swastima Khadka, produced and starred in Behuli from Meghauli. The film went on to become a semi-hit.

=== Controversy ===
Basnet admitted to being present at the 2025 Nepalese Gen Z protests. There is no confirmation he was involved in any of the violence, and he has claimed that he was preventing others from violence. As a result of his support, though, there have been calls to boycott his films. Surya Thapa, a former lawmaker, criticized Basnet publicly after Basnet voiced support for the film Lalibazaar, halted by court order, during a protest at Maitighar Mandala.

== Early life and personal life ==
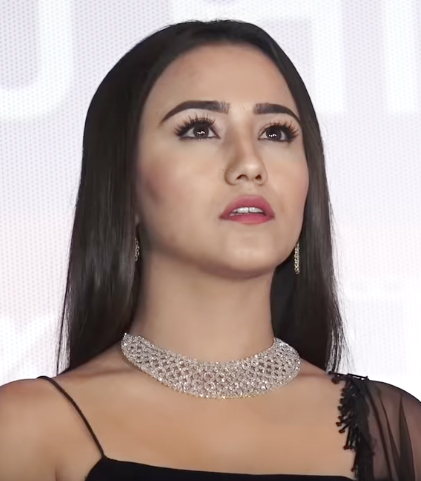
The Nepalese actress Swastima Khadka, Basnet's wife, in May 2019.

Before venturing into the film industry, Basnet pursued an interest in becoming a footballer and even joined a club, but, according to him, "nothing went right so [he] just left". He later wanted to become a musician; he recalled that "singing was the only thing that [he] constantly carried from [his] childhood". He recorded some songs, but they were lost due to the studio closing down. His mother wanted him to "become a doctor or an army officer", and he nearly applied to be in the military, but says that the plan "went wrong".

Basnet graduated from Oscar International College of Film Studies in Kathmandu, Nepal. Later he travelled to Australia to study 3D animation, but changed to hospitality and became a chef. This stint in hospitality included everything from "washing dishes to cleaning floors". He said that he believed he was making no progress, so he left Australia and returned to Nepal.

Basnet enjoys bicycling in his free time, and has said: "When on a bike, I feel a kind of thrill I can't explain." On 14 December 2015, Basnet and Swastima Khadka became engaged in the presence of close relatives. They married on 17 February 2016, in a private ceremony held at Royal Events Banquet and Restaurant in Tinkune. On 3 August 2019 the couple was given an "Ideal Couple" award by the mayor of Lalitpur.

== Accolades ==
Basnet has won two Dcine Awards: for Best Debut Director and Best Cameo Role. He was also nominated for the Dcine Award for Best Actor in a Negative Role. He has won one National Film Award as Best Director, and was nominated as Best Actor in a Negative Role at the Kamana Film Awards.

List of accolades received by Nischal Basnet
Year	Award	Category	Film	Result	Ref(s)
2012	Dcine Award	Best Debut Director	Loot	Won	
2015	National Film Award	Best Director	Talakjung vs Tulke	Won	
2017	Dcine Award	Best Cameo Role	Lappan Chappan	Won	
2019	Kamana Film Award	Best Actor in a Negative Role	Prasad	Nominated	
2019	Dcine Award	Best Actor in a Negative Role	Prasad	Nominated	
