= Dipendra K. Khanal =

Nepalese film director

- दिपेन्द्र के खनाल
- Born: 3 April 1980 (age 46); Nuwakot, Nepal
- Citizenship: Nepali
- Occupation: Director•Producer•Writer
- Years active: 2010-Present
- Known for: Pashupati Prasad; Chapali Height 2

Dipendra K. Khanal is Nepali screenwriter and film director, known best for his direction in Pashupati Prasad (2016) and Chapali height 2 (2016). Khanal's debut direction was The Yug Dekhi Yug Samma. He has directed films like Jholay, Vigilante, etc.

== Filmography ==
Key
†	Denotes films that have not yet been released

Year	Film	Role	Note
2010	Dharmaa	Director	Manisha Koirala starrer Nepali film
2012	Chapali Height	Director	Blockbuster
2013	Vigilante 3D	Director / producer	Nepal's first 3D film
2014	Jholay	Director	Dark comedy
2016	Pashupati Prasad	Director / story	Blockbuster, positive reviews
2016	Chapali height 2	Director / story	Sequel of Chapali Height
2017	Love Love Love	Director / story	Released on Baisakh 1 2074 (April 14). Charged 20 lakhs for the film making him highest paid director.
2017	Dhanapati	Director	Released on Ashad 23, 2074 (July 7)
2020	Aama	Director / story	Blockbuster
2022	Chiso Manchhe	Director / story	Blockbuster
2022	Ke Ghar Ke Dera	Director	Blockbuster
2023	Pashupati Prasad 2: Bhasme Don	Director	Upcoming movie

== Awards and nominations ==
List of awards and nominations
Year	Ceremony	Category	Nominated work	Result
2016	Moviemandu Movie Person of the year	Movie Person of the year	Dipendra K Khanal	Won
2016	FAAN Awards	Best Director	Dipendra K Khanal	Won
2016	National Film Awards 2016	Best Director	Pashupati Prasad	Won
2016	8th Dcine Awards 2016	Best Director	Pashupati Prasad	Won
2016	NFDC Award 2016	Best Director	Pashupati Prasad	Won
2016	LG Film Awards	Best Director	Pashupati Prasad	Won
2016	Kamana Film Awards	Best Director	Pashupati Prasad	Won
