= Dayahang Rai filmography =

Dayahang Rai's film credits

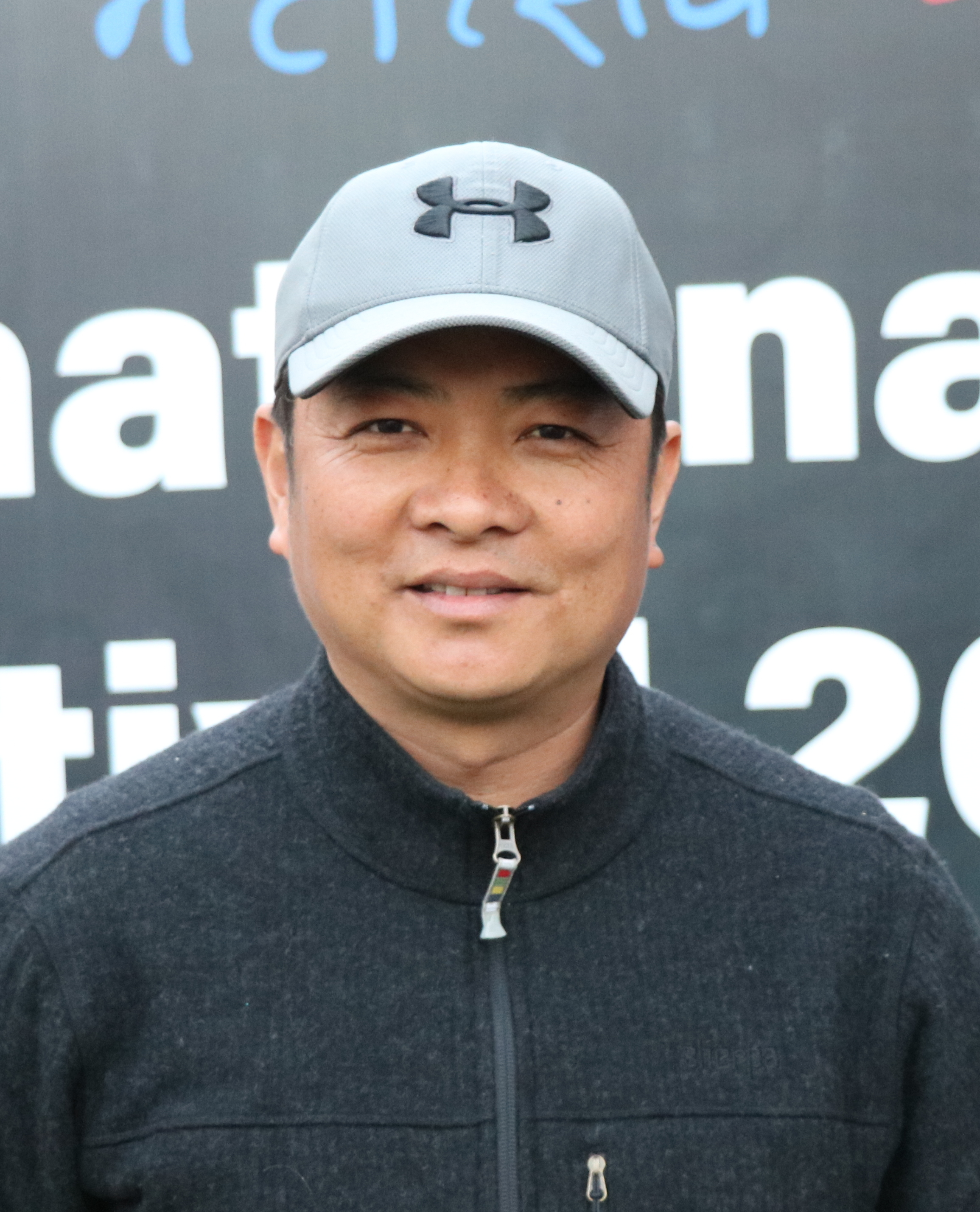
Dayahang Rai at the International Theater Festival in 2019

Dayahang Rai is a Nepali actor who made his debut in the 2009 romantic comedy film Mero Euta Saathi Chha. The same year, Rai appeared in the mystery Dasdhunga, in which he portrays the suspected killer of Madan Bhandari, leader of the Communist Party of Nepal; this performance garnered the National Film Award for Best Supporting Actor. In 2012, his breakthrough role came in Loot, in which he starred as Gofle, who with his four friends sets out to rob a bank in Kathmandu. Rai's performance was praised and the film was a commercial success. He then starred in Deepak Rauniyar's drama Highway (2012). In 2013, he appeared in Badhshala, a film about the Nepalese Civil War and the human rights abuses committed by the Nepali Army. This film was later banned in Nepal by the military and criticised for empathising with Maoists.

In 2014, Rai appeared in the comedy Jholay, in which he portrays a man who visits Kathmandu to go to a foreign country to find work. His performance received positive feedback from critics. He also starred in Ram Babu Gurung's comedy-drama Kabaddi and Nischal Basnet's crime drama Talakjung vs Tulke. He received widespread critical acclaim for his performance in both films. Talakjung vs Tulke was selected as the Nepalese entry for the Best Foreign Language Film at the 88th Academy Awards, but it was not nominated. In 2015, Rai won the National Film Award for Best Actor for his performance in Sambodhan. That same year, he starred in Kabaddi Kabaddi, the sequel to Kabaddi. This film became one of Nepali cinema's highest-grossing films, and Rai won the National Film Award for Best Actor.

In 2016, Rai appeared in the war drama White Sun, in which he portrays Chandra, an anti-regime partisan Maoist who returns to his village for his father's funeral. The film was selected as the Nepali entry for the Best Foreign Language Film at the 90th Academy Awards, but it was not nominated. In 2017, Rai starred in Loot 2, the sequel to Loot. This film received mixed feedback from critics and audiences but was a commercial success at the box office. In the film Ghampani, Rai played Furba, a Tamang boy who has an inter-caste marriage with a Brahmin girl. In Taandro, he plays Koshish, a member of an underground Maoist party that is trying to overthrow the Government of Nepal. Rai was praised for his portrayal.

In 2019, Rai appeared in a supporting role in Saili, for which he won the Kamana Film Award for Best Actor in a Supporting Role. The same year, he starred in Jatrai Jatra as a don, and his performance was praised by the critics. Later he appeared in the third installment of the Kabaddi series, Kabaddi Kabaddi Kabaddi, which was commercially successful. It grossed 14.7 million Nepalese rupees on its first day of screening, setting the record for the highest-grossing opening of a film in Nepal. In 2020, Rai starred in the comedy-drama Senti Virus, which was pulled from cinema halls after three weeks of screening due to the COVID-19 pandemic in Nepal. Apart from acting, Rai produced Machha Machha in 2019.

== Films ==
Key
| † | Denotes films that have not yet been released |

| Year | Title | Role(s) | Notes | Ref. |
|---|---|---|---|---|
| 2010 | Mero Euta Saathi Chha | College student | | |
| 2010 | Dasdhunga | Suspected killer of Madan Bhandari | | |
| 2011 | Mero Love Story | | | |
| 2012 | Loot | Gopal "Gofle" | | |
| 2012 | Highway | Manoj | | |
| 2013 | Chhadke | Dawa | | |
| 2013 | Badhshala | Captain Rai | | |
| 2013 | Sanghuro | Tika | | |
| 2013 | Uma | Comrade Sonam | | |
| 2013 | Karkash | Andy | | |
| 2013 | Loafer | Vanta | | |
| 2014 | Jholay | Harke | | |
| 2014 | Kabaddi | Kaji | | |
| 2014 | Mukhauta | Police officer | | |
| 2014 | Nagbeli | Phurba | | |
| 2014 | Talakjung vs Tulke | Kathmandu Gang Boss | | |
| 2015 | Ichchha | Friend | | |
| 2015 | Sambodhan | Ram | | |
| 2015 | Woda Number 6 | Daya | | |
| 2015 | Kabaddi Kabaddi | Kaji | | |
| 2016 | Fanko | Buddhabir Rai | | |
| 2016 | Rahadani | Friend | | |
| 2016 | How Funny | Tej Bahadur Rai | | |
| 2016 | Bir Bikram | Bir | | |
| 2016 | Jhumkee | Police officer | | |
| 2016 | Purano Dunga | Batase | | |
| 2016 | White Sun | Agni / Chandra | | |
| 2017 | Loot 2 | Gopal "Gofle" | | |
| 2017 | Lappan Chhappan | Inspector Tamang | | |
| 2017 | Ghampani | Furba | | |
| 2017 | Lalteen | Lalle | | |
| 2017 | Taandro | Ganga Bahadur Lama (Koshish) | | |
| 2018 | Mr. Jholay | Purne | | |
| 2018 | Kanchhi | Hira | | |
| 2018 | Happy Days | Kumar | | |
| 2018 | Nepte | Antagonist | | |
| 2018 | Bhaire | Bhaire | | |
| 2019 | Saili | Birman | | |
| 2019 | Jatrai Jatra | Dawa | | |
| 2019 | Appa | Birkhe / Appa | | |
| 2019 | Kabaddi Kabaddi Kabaddi | Kaji | | |
| 2019 | Machha Machha | Police officer | Cameo; Also producer | |
| 2020 | Senti Virus | Leader | | |
| 2022 | Kabaddi 4: The Final Match | Kaji | | |
| 2022 | The Secrets of Radha | | | |
| 2022 | Dui Nambari | Chiring | | |
| 2022 | Ke Ghar Ke Dera | | | |
| 2023 | Fulbari | Baliyan | | |
| 2023 | Bihe Pass | Bhagya Raj | | |
| 2023 | Jaari | Namsang | | |
| 2023 | Neerphool | | | |
| 2023 | Nango Gau | Pasang | | |
| 2023 | Dimag Kharab | Bhola | | |
| 2024 | Dayarani | Chitra Jung | | |
| 2024 | Hattichhap | Ambare | | |
| 2024 | Rangeli | Vijay | | |
| 2024 | Degree Maila: MA 3rd Class | Dilliram | | |
| 2024 | Mansarra | | | |
| 2024 | A Road to a Village | Maila | | |
| 2024 | Gharjwai | Soro | | |
| 2025 | Karsang | | | |
| 2025 | Dukhi Aatma | Chewang | | |
| 2025 | Anjila | Anjila's father | | |
| 2025 | Rajagunj | Madan | | |
| 2025 | Pitambar | D. Rai | | |
| 2025 | Bhuthan | | | |
| 2025 | Mahabhoj | | | |
| 2025 | Reemai | | | |
| 2025 | Baristha Balaram | | | |
| 2025 | Jaari 2 | Namsang | | |
| 2026 | Mirmire | sonam | | |
| 2026 | Mitjyu | Lead | | |
