= Kabaddi 5: After the Final Match =

2026 Nepali film

- Theatrical release poster
- Directed by: Ram Babu Gurung
- Written by: Ram Babu Gurung
- Produced by: Ram Babu Gurung; Maniram Pokhrel; Madhu Mijar; Vishal Gurung
- Starring: Dayahang Rai; Bipin Karki; Bijay Baral; Buddhi Tamang; Miruna Magar; Rishma Gurung; Srijana Gurung
- Cinematography: Sanjay Lama
- Edited by: Surendra Poudel
- Music by: Rikesh Gurung
- Production company: Baasuri Films
- Distributed by: Byankatesh Entertainment; The Tea Folks
- Release date: October 23, 2026
- Running time: 145 minutes
- Country: Nepal
- Language: Nepali
- Budget: रू3 crore (US$200,000)
- Box office: रू12.40 crore (US$830,000)

Kabaddi 5: After the Final Match (Nepali: कबड्डी ५) is a 2026 Nepali romantic comedy-drama film written and directed by Ram Babu Gurung. Produced under the banner of Baasuri Films, it serves as the fifth installment in the Kabaddi film franchise and continuing the narrative of Kaji following the events of Kabaddi 4: The Final Match (2022). The film stars Dayahang Rai reprising his iconic role alongside an ensemble cast including Bipin Karki, Bijay Baral, Buddhi Tamang, Miruna Magar, Rishma Gurung and Srijana Gurung.

The film was released in theatres across Nepal on 23 October 2026, coincing with the festive Dashain season.

== Synopsis ==
The film shifts its narrative focus away from Kaji's traditional romantic pursuits to center on his livelihood, career path, and practical life decisions. The story follows Kaji as he navigates a new chapter of his life in rural Nepal, dealing with evolving personal responsibilities, everyday challenges and the realities of his changing world.

== Cast ==
- Dayahang Rai as Kaji
- Bipin Karki
- Bijay Baral as B.K.
- Buddhi Tamang as Chhantyal
- Miruna Magar as Miss Shanti
- Rishma Gurung as Maiya
- Srijana Gurung as Shantimaya
- Pushkar Gurung as Kaji's father
- Kabita Ale as Kaji's mother
- Aruna Karki as Maiya's mother
- Shishir Bangdel as Maiya's father
- Maotse Gurung
- Kamal Mani Nepal

== Soundtrack ==
The background score of the film is provided by Rikesh Gurung, while the music is composed by Kali Prasad Baskota. The first song, titled "Thak Khola", was released on October 5, 2026, followed by "Bujhana Malai" on October 28 and "Rajai" in November 2026.

All lyrics are written by Kali Prasad Baskota; all music is composed by Kali Prasad Baskota.

No.	Title	Singer(s)	Length
1.	"Thak Khola"	Kali Prasad Baskota	4:00
2.	"Bujhana Malai (The Song of Kaji)"	Kali Prasad Baskota	4:18
3.	"Rajai"	Darshana Gandhari	4:06
4.	"Thak Khola (Female Version)"	Pitu Gahatraj	3:10
Total length:			15:34

== Production ==
Following the record breaking success of Kabaddi 4, director and writer Ram Babu Gurung began development on the fifth installment. Principal photography commenced in October 2025 in the Mustang district of Nepal, following a traditional blessing ceremony at the Muktinath Temple. The film was produced by Ram Babu Gurung, Maniram Pokhrel, Madhu Mijar, and Vishal Gurung under the banner of Baasuri Films.

== Box office ==
The film opened with mixed word of mouth and grossed रू10.77 crore in the first 10 days of its release in Nepal, becoming the third film in the franchise to cross the 10 crore milestone. After 17 days, it minted रू12.40 crore, continuing the box office success of the franchise.

== See also ==
- Kabaddi
- Kabaddi Kabaddi
- Kabaddi Kabaddi Kabaddi
- Kabaddi 4: The Final Match
