= Kabaddi (franchise) =

Nepali film series directed by Ram Babu Gurung

- Nepali: कबड्डी
- Directed by: Ram Babu Gurung
- Written by: Ram Babu Gurung; Upendra Subba
- Produced by: Nischal Basnet; Sunil Chand Rauniyar; Raunak Bikram Kandel; Mani Ram Pokharel; Arjun Karki; Om Chand Rauniyar; Bishal Gurung; Sushma Gurung; Madhu Mijar
- Starring: Dayahang Rai; Bijay Baral; Buddhi Tamang; Rishma Gurung; Saugat Malla; Miruna Magar; Nischal Basnet
- Cinematography: Shailendra D Karki; Purushottam Pradhan
- Edited by: Nimesh Shrestha
- Music by: Rohit Shakya
- Production companies: Baasuri Films; Cinema Art; Black Horse Pictures
- Country: Nepal
- Language: Nepali
- Budget: रू6.85 crore
- Box office: रू46.70 crore

Kabaddi (Nepali: कबड्डी) is a series of comedy drama films directed by Ram Babu Gurung and is one of the biggest franchises of Nepali Cinema. The first film in the series, Kabaddi was released in 2014. The latest film, Kabaddi 4: The Final Match was released in 2022. A total of four films have been produced in the franchise as of 2025.

== Films ==
The franchise was launched with the release of the first film, Kabaddi (2014), which was both written and directed by Ram Babu Gurung. It received overwhelming positive response from the audience to become an all time blockbuster and a landmark film in modern Nepali filmmaking. The central and recurring plot revolves around the relentless, often comedic, attempts of the main character, Kaji (played by Dayahang Rai), an uneducated but earnest young man from a village, to marry the women he loves, with each sequel continuing the saga of his pursuits and failed attempts.

The films have consistently featured a strong ensemble cast, including Dayahang Rai, Bijay Baral, Buddhi Tamang, and Saugat Malla, and have been praised for their authentic setting, relatable humor, and cultural depth. The latest installment, Kabaddi 4: The Final Match (2022), was marketed as the final film in Kaji's arc. Directed by Ram Babu Gurung and co-written with Upendra Subba, it broke several box office records, becoming the highest grossing Nepali film in Nepal at the time of its release. Its immense commercial and critical success firmly cemented the Kabaddi franchise as a monumental figure in Nepali film history.

These are the films that have been released in this franchise.

List of Kabaddi Franchise Films
Film	Release date	Director(s)	Writer(s)	Ref(s)
Kabaddi	25 April 2014	Ram Babu Gurung	Ram Babu Gurung	
Kabaddi Kabaddi	27 November 2015	Ram Babu Gurung	Ram Babu Gurung; Upendra Subba	
Kabaddi Kabaddi Kabaddi	20 September 2019	Ram Babu Gurung	Ram Babu Gurung; Upendra Subba	
Kabaddi 4: The Final Match	27 May 2022	Ram Babu Gurung	Ram Babu Gurung; Upendra Subba	
Kabaddi 5: After the Final Match	23 Oct 2026	Ram Babu Gurung	Ram Babu Gurung	

== Cast ==
This table below lists the main characters who appeared in the Kabaddi Franchise.

Actors	Films			
Actors	Kabaddi (2014)	Kabaddi Kabaddi (2015)	Kabaddi Kabaddi Kabaddi (2019)	Kabaddi 4: The Final Match (2022)
Dayahang Rai	Kaji (Main)	Kaji (Main)	Kaji (Main)	Kaji (Main)
Bijay Baral	B.K. (Main)	B.K. (Main)	B.K. (Main)	B.K. (Main)
Buddhi Tamang	Chhantyal (Main)	Chhantyal (Main)	Chhantyal (Main)	Chhantyal (Main)
Rishma Gurung	Maiya (Main)	Maiya (Main)	Maiya (Cameo)	
Saugat Malla		Bam Kaji (Main)		Bam Kaji (Main)
Puskar Gurung	Mukhiya	Mukhiya	Mukhiya	Mukhiya
Karma Shakya			Myaki (Main)	
Miruna Magar				Miss Shanti (Main)
Upasana Singh Thakuri			Kasi (Main)	
Nischal Basnet	Bibek (Main)	Bibek (Cameo)		

== Producers ==
The table below lists the producers who were part of the production team, including producers, co-producers, and executive producers.

Producer	Films			
Producer	Kabaddi (2014)	Kabaddi Kabaddi (2015)	Kabaddi Kabaddi Kabaddi (2019)	Kabaddi 4: The Final Match (2022)
Nischal Basnet	Producer	Executive		
Sunil Chand Rauniyar	Producer			
Om Chand Rauniyar	Executive	Co-Producer	Producer	
Mani Ram Pokhrel			Producer	
Arjun Karki	Executive	Co-Producer	Producer	Executive
Raunak Bikram Kandel		Producer		
Ruden Sada Lepcha			Co-Producer	
Bishal Gurung				Producer
Sushma Gurung				Producer
Madhu Mijar				Producer

== Box office performance ==
Film	Release date	Budget	Nepal Box Office	Verdict
Kabaddi	25 April 2014	रू35 lakhs	रू7.35 crore	All Time Blockbuster
Kabaddi Kabaddi	27 November 2015	रू1 crore	रू10.35 crore	All Time BlockBuster
Kabaddi Kabaddi Kabaddi	20 September 2019	रू2.5 crore	रू7.60 crore	Hit
Kabaddi 4: The Final Match	27 May 2022	रू3 crore	रू21.40 crore	All Time Blockbuster
Total		रू6.85 crore	रू46.70 crore	
