= List of highest-grossing films in Nepal =

The following is a list of highest-grossing films in Nepal, with gross revenue in Nepali Rupees. These box office figures are the official reports published by Nepal's governing body for cinema, the Film Development Board. The Board standardized reporting by introducing a digital box office system, starting in the Kathmandu Valley on July 18, 2018 and then rolling it out to the rest of the country about a year later. Therefore, the revenue for films released since then is based on the official data from the Board's Central Cinema Management System (CCMS).

== Overview ==
The film industry in Nepal is still relatively young. In the early days, most films were bankrolled by the government through the Royal Nepal Film Corporation (est. 1971). Their focus wasn't really on hitting commercial targets; it was more about showcasing and preserving Nepal's rich cultural heritage. However, their efforts gradually laid the groundwork for the industry, eventually making room for private producers to step in. The first major turning point came with Kusume Rumal (1985), which held the box office crown until it was finally unseated in 2001 by the musical hit, Darpan Chhaya.

A new era of success began in 2012 when the critically acclaimed crime thriller, Loot, became the first film ever to cross the रू5 crore milestone domestically. Just two years layer, the drama-thriller Kohinoor (2014) doubled the benchmark, becoming the first ever to earn over रू10 crore and setting a massive new standard for Nepali cinema. This record was quickly topped in 2016 by the comedy-drama Chhakka Panja, which raked in an impressive रू16 crore.

The next big leap happened in 2022 as Kabaddi 4: The Final Match became the first Nepali film to break the रू20 crore barrier. It was only the second film ever to achieve this feat in Nepal, following the Indian hit Baahubali 2: The Conclusion back in 2017. Purna Bahadur Ko Sarangi set new benchmarks in 2024 with an unprecedented business, crossing the colossal रू40 crore milestone. It remains the first and only film to achieve this.

== Domestic films ==
The list contains domestic films with gross figures exceeding रू10 crore in Nepal. All the box office figures are verified and published by the Film Development Board.

*	Denotes films still running in theatres

Rank	Peak	Film	Year	Director	Gross	Ref.
1	1	Purna Bahadur Ko Sarangi	2024	Saroj Poudel	रू46.87 crore	
2	2	Gauthali	2026	Kapil Rijal	रू26.27 crore	
3	1	Kabaddi 4: The Final Match	2022	Ram Babu Gurung	रू21.40 crore	
4	2	12 Gaun	2024	Biraj Bhatta	रू19.93 crore	
5	4	Paran	2025	Deepak Prasad Acharya	रू17.77 crore	
6	2	Chhakka Panja 4	2023	Hem Raj BC	रू17.53 crore	
7	3	Jaari	2023	Upendra Subba	रू17.48 crore	
8	1	Chhakka Panja	2016	Deepa Shree Niraula	रू16.10 crore	
9	5	Mahajatra	2024	Pradip Bhattarai	रू15.68 crore	
10	7	Chhakka Panja 5	2024	Deepa Shree Niraula	रू15.20 crore	
11	1	Kohinoor	2014	Aakash Adhikari	रू14.75 crore	
12	3	Chhakka Panja 2	2017	Deepa Shree Niraula	रू14.51 crore	
13	12	Aa Bata Aama	2026	Chandra Pant	रू13.20 crore	
14	14	Kabaddi 5: After the Final Match *	2026	Ram Babu Gurung	रू12.94 crore	
15	4	Shatru Gate	2018	Pradip Bhattarai	रू12.65 crore	
16	12	Jerry on Top	2025	Suyog Gurung	रू12.29 crore	
17	12	Unko Sweater	2025	Nabin Chauhan	रू11.42 crore	
18	18	Pension Patta *	2026	Maotse Gurung	रू10.36 crore	
19	2	Kabaddi Kabaddi	2015	Ram Babu Gurung	रू10.35 crore	
20	10	Boksi Ko Ghar	2024	Sulakshyan Bharati	रू10.10 crore	

== Foreign films ==
This list contains foreign films grossing over रू10 crore in Nepal.

*	Denotes film is still running in theatres

Rank	Film	Year	Director	Language	Gross	Ref.
1	Pushpa 2: The Rule	2024	Sukumar	Telugu	रू26.46 crore	
2	Ramayana: Part 1 *	2026	Nitesh Tiwari	Hindi	रू25.30 crore	
3	Baahubali 2: The Conclusion	2017	S.S. Rajamouli	Telugu	रू23 crore	
4	KGF: Chapter 2	2022	Prashanth Neel	Kannada	रू19.80 crore	
5	RRR	2022	S.S. Rajamouli	Telugu	रू17.12 crore	
6	Animal	2023	Sandeep Reddy Vanga	Hindi	रू16.56 crore	
7	Spider-Man: Brand New Day	2026	Destin Daniel Cretton	English	रू16.05 crore	
8	Jawan	2023	Atlee	Hindi	रू14.35 crore	
9	Dhurandhar: The Revenge	2026	Aditya Dhar	Hindi	रू13.39 crore	
10	Pathaan	2023	Siddharth Anand	Hindi	रू13.33 crore	
11	Kalki 2898 AD	2024	Nag Ashwin	Telugu	रू12.58 crore	
12	Kantara: Chapter 1	2025	Rishab Shetty	Kannada	रू12.35 crore	
13	Dhurandhar	2025	Aditya Dhar	Hindi	रू10.51 crore	
14	Saiyaara	2025	Mohit Suri	Hindi	रू10.14 crore	

== Highest-grossing films by year ==
Only the films released after 2012 (2068 BS) are listed here.

Denotes a foreign film

Year	Film	Production	Gross
2012	Loot	Black Horse Pictures	रू5.20 crore
2013	Dhoom 3	Yash Raj Films	रू6 crore
2014	Kohinoor	Nepa Movies	रू14.75 crore
2015	Kabaddi Kabaddi	Cinema Art	रू10.35 crore
2016	Chhakka Panja	Aama Saraswoti Movies	रू16.10 crore
2017	Baahubali 2: The Conclusion	Arka Media Works	रू23 crore
2018	Shatru Gate	Maha Sanchar	रू12.65 crore
2019	Chha Maya Chhapakkai	Aama Saraswoti Movies	रू9.93 crore
2020	Senti Virus	Subihani Films	रू3.60 crore
2021	Spider-Man: No Way Home	Marvel Studios	रू7.30 crore
2022	Kabaddi 4: The Final Match	Baasuri Films	रू21.40 crore
2023	Chakka Panja 4	Aama Saraswoti Movies	रू17.53 crore
2024	Purna Bahadur Ko Sarangi	Seven Seas Cinema	रू46.87 crore
2025	Paran	Biscope Cinema	रू17.77 crore
2026	Gauthali	Bhola Rijal Production	रू26.27 crore

== See also ==
- List of Nepalese films
- Lists of highest-grossing films
- List of most expensive Nepali films
- List of foreign films shot in Nepal
- List of Nepal Bhasa films
