= Paran (film) =

Nepalese social-drama film

- Theatrical release poster
- परान: सासले हैन, साथले चल्ने
- Directed by: Deepak Prasad Acharya
- Screenplay by: Yam Thapa
- Story by: Deepak Prasad Acharya
- Produced by: Ranjit Acharya; Shekhar Golchha
- Starring: Neer Shah; Madan Krishna Shrestha; Keki Adhikari
- Cinematography: Shivaram Shrestha
- Edited by: Mitra Dev Gurung
- Music by: Ganga Thapa Magar
- Production company: Biscope Cinema
- Distributed by: DC Nepal
- Release date: 31 October 2025
- Running time: 144 minutes
- Country: Nepal
- Language: Nepali
- Budget: est.रू3 crore
- Box office: est.रू17.84 crore

Paran (Nepali: परान, transl. Soul) is a 2025 Nepalese social-drama film directed by Deepak Prasad Acharya, as known by his stage name 'Kaku', marking his directorial debut. The screenplay was written by Yam Thapa and produced by Ranjit Acharya and Shekhar Golchha under the banner of Biscope Cinema Pvt Ltd. It features an ensemble cast including Neer Bikram Shah, Madan Krishna Shrestha, Pooja Chand, Keki Adhikari and Anjana Baraili.

The film is a family drama centered on the relationship between an aging parent and his adult children, addressing social themes of social values, modern ambition, and the emotional distance created by capitalism within Nepali families. The film released in Cinemas on 31 October 2025 across Nepal, and received strong positive reviews from audiences and achieved commercial success.

== Synopsis ==
Paran's story revolves around a father who is navigating the latter stages of his life and is desperately seeking the love and closeness of his children. The narrative highlights the conflict that arises when elderly parents desire the companionship of their children, who are simultaneously pursuing their own personal ambitions and modern aspirations. The film is characterized by its emotional depth, focusing on the pain and sensitivity of the father-son relationship.

== Cast ==
- Neer Bikram Shah
- Madan Krishna Shrestha
- Pooja Chand
- Keki Adhikari
- Prabin Khatiwada
- Mahesh Tripathi
- Anjana Baraili
- Buddhi Tamang
- Yaseli Yonghang

== Soundtrack ==
The music for the songs is composed by Rhythm Kandel while Ganga Thapa provided the background score. The first song "Oye Bhanda Ni Bolena" was released on 28 September, followed by the title song of the film "Khyal Gari Sachaula" on 30 October.

All music is composed by Rhythm Kandel.

No.	Title	Lyrics	Singer(s)	Length
1.	"Oye Bhanda Ni Bolena"	Deepak Prasad Acharya, Anish Adhikari	Pramod Kharel, Yaman Shrestha, Rhythm Kandel, Rachana Rimal, Salina BK	4:28
2.	"Khyal Gari Sachaula"	Deepak Prasad Acharya	Pushpan Pradhan	5:00
Total length:				9:28

== Reception ==
The film was met with significant positive response from the audience for its relatable and moving story, strong acting, and overall presentation. Social media widely shared videos showing audience members becoming emotional while watching the film. The film's commercial success was affirmed when the positive word-of-mouth led to an increase in the number of screening theatres in its second week.

== Box office ==
Initially opened in only a few theatres, the film received positive response from audience and managed to gross रू3.71 crore after 9 days in Nepal box office. Continuing the momentum, it minted रू9.87 crore after 16 days, and रू14.16 crore in 23 days, becoming the highest-grossing film of the year, surpassing Jerry on Top. After grossing रू17.61 crore in 51 days, it became the fourth highest-grossing Nepali film of all time in Nepal.

== See also ==
- List of highest-grossing films in Nepal
- List of Nepalese films
- List of most expensive Nepali films
