= Degree Maila: MA 3rd Class =

- Theatrical release poster
- डिग्री माइला: एमए थर्ड क्लास
- Directed by: Ram Babu Gurung
- Story by: Saayad Ashok
- Based on: Degree Maila (play)
- Produced by: Bishal Gurung; Mani Ram Pokharel
- Starring: Dayahang Rai; Aanchal Sharma; Bijay Baral; Buddhi Tamang
- Cinematography: Shiva Ram Shrestha; Riley H. Sen
- Edited by: Nimesh Shrestha
- Music by: Rohit Shakya
- Production company: Baasuri Films
- Distributed by: Byankatesh Entertainment; Kafiya films
- Release date: 12 April 2024
- Country: Nepal
- Budget: रु 2.75 Crore
- Box office: रु 5.05 Crore

Degree Maila: MA 3rd Class (Nepali: डिग्री माइला: एमए थर्ड क्लास) is a 2024 Nepali social comedy-drama film directed by Ram Babu Gurung, based on a play written by Saayad Ashok. It's produced by Bishal Gurung, Mani Ram Pokharel, Madhu Mijar and Sushma Gurung under the banner of Baasuri Films in association with Sushma Productions. It features Dayahang Rai and Aanchal Sharma in lead roles with Maotse Gurung, Prakash Ghimire, Bijay Baral, Buddhi Tamang, Kamal Mani Nepal in supporting roles. A story of a city-returned degree holder; the film emphasizes on education and unemployment issues in Nepal.

The film released on 12 April 2024, on the eve of Nepalese new year 2081 BS, among mixed reviews from critics. The first half of the film received applause but its second half drew a lot of mixed response, affecting its box office potential. Nonetheless, it was praised for its relevant story.

== Synopsis ==
Degree Maaila is the only English graduate in a village, who has returned from a city. As the campus committee is warned to run the English classes properly or bear the consequences of shutting down, they decide to hire him for the job, which he declines. His love interest and the committee want him to take up the job but he is adamant. The film explores the theme of education system and unemployment issues in Nepali society through this backstory.

== Cast ==
- Dayahang Rai as Dilli Ram Bhujel/Degree Maila
- Aanchal Sharma as Kabita Sharma
- Maotse Gurung as Bhoj Bahadur Bhujel
- Prakash Ghimire as Rudra Prasad Dahal
- Bijay Baral as Bakhate
- Buddhi Tamang as Purna Bahadur Gurung
- Kamal Mani Nepal as Kamalmani
- Som Nath Khanal as Shanti Ram
- Pashupati Rai as Sapana Sauni
- Reecha Sharma as Nirichyak Madam

== Soundtrack ==
The background score is composed by Rohit Shakya. The first song titled "Susta Susta" was released on 23 February 2024 followed by another song "Kina" on 3 April. The title song "Ma Degree Maila Ho" was released on 13 April, on the occasion of birthday of its lead actor Dayahang Rai.

No.	Title	Lyrics	Music	Singer(s)	Length
1.	"Susta Susta"	Dillu Chamlagai	SD Yogi	SD Yogi, Bigyani Parajuli	4:34
2.	"Kina"	Hemant Rana	Hemant Rana	Hemant Rana	4:04
3.	"Ma Degree Maila Ho"	Swapnil Smriti	Jhuma Limbu	Pawan Giri	4:07
Total length:					12:45

== Box Office ==
The film opened with 98 lakhs gross on Friday and added 2.08 crore on Saturday for a total first weekend gross of 3.06 crore. The film amassed a total of 5.05 crore in the first week of its release in Nepal.
