= Mansarra =

2024 Nepalese film

- Theatrical release poster
- मनसरा
- Directed by: Upendra Subba
- Written by: Upendra Subba
- Produced by: Shailendra D. Karki
- Starring: Miruna Magar; Dayahang Rai; Menuka Pradhan; Prabin Khatiwada
- Cinematography: Shailendra D. Karki
- Edited by: Nimesh Shrestha
- Music by: Rohit Shakya
- Production company: Kabaddi Films
- Distributed by: Apple Entertainment
- Release date: 3 May 2024
- Running time: 132 minutes
- Country: Nepal
- Box office: रू4.78 crore

Mansarra (Nepali: मनसरा) is a 2024 Nepali social drama film written and directed by Upendra Subba. It's produced by Shailendra Dhoj Karki under the banner of Kabaddi Films, who also serves as the cinematographer for the film. The film stars Miruna Magar, Dayahang Rai, Menuka Pradhan and Praveen Khatiwada. It's Subba's second film, after the blockbuster success of his debut venture Jaari.

It was released in cinemas on 3 May 2024 with the film garnering positive response from the premieres. The film received excellent response especially from Eastern regions in Nepal.

== Synopsis ==
Mansarra tells the story of Manrani, a Limbu single mother struggling to raise her son, Tancho, on the outskirts of Kathmandu after her lover leaves for foreign employment. Her life intersects with Dadhiram, a Brahmin man tormented by his infertility, a truth he refuses to acknowledge. After leaving his first wife and marrying a second, Dadhiram discovers the medical truth and struggles with societal shame, leading to tension in his marriage. He attempts to forge a bond with Manrani and her son, who craves a father figure.

As Manrani deals with the uncertainty of her past love, Dadhiram confronts his deepest vulnerabilities and his own family over his identity. The film is a holistic portrayal of migration, cultural differences, and family conflicts, ultimately emphasizing the importance of resilience, cultural acceptance, and confronting the stigma surrounding infertility.

== Cast ==
- Miruna Magar as Manrani Limbu
- Dayahang Rai as Manhang Chemjong
- Menuka Pradhan as Nani Maya
- Prabin Khatiwada as Dadhiram Pokharel
- Shanti Giri
- Hemanta Budhathoki
- Nenahang Rai

== Soundtrack ==
The background score is composed by Rohit Shakya. Jhuma Limbu & Foeseal and Sushant Gautam composed the music for the film. The first song titled "Jhyalko" was released on 29 April 2024. Songs titled "Ek Taar Manko" and "Charkoba Naach" were releases on May 5 and 7 respectively.

All lyrics are written by Harka Saud.

No.	Title	Singer	Length
1.	"Jhyalko"	Sanup Poudel, Jhuma Limbu	4:01
2.	"Ek Taar Manko"	Mamata Gurung, Sadikshya Nepal	2:57
3.	"Charkoba Naach"	Madhu Kerung	4:19
Total length:			11:17

== Box Office ==
The film managed to collect रु3.2 crore in the first week of its release in Nepal, entering into profit zone due to low production cost. However, its box office potential was impacted partially owing to clash with Boksi Ko Ghar, which released a week prior. Its final collection is reported as रु4.78 crore.
