= Saili (film) =

- Directed by: Ram Babu Gurung
- Written by: Ram Babu Gurung
- Starring: Dayahang Rai; Gaurav Pahari; Menuka Pradhan; Buddhi Tamang
- Release date: 29 March 2019 (Nepal)
- Country: Nepal
- Language: Nepali

Saili is a 2019 Nepali drama film, directed by Ram Babu Gurung. The film stars Dayahang Rai, Gaurav Pahari, Menuka Pradhan, Buddhi Tamang, Maotse Gurung. It is about labour migration of Nepalese youths.

== Cast ==
- Dayahang Rai
- Gaurav Pahari
- Menuka Pradhan
- Buddhi Tamang
- Maotse Gurung

== Reception ==
Diwakar Pyakurel of OnlineKhabar found the film to be a "realistic humane story". Abhimanyu Dixit of The Kathmandu Post wrote "At a time when Nepali films are as dismal as they are, Saili stands out. It presents a dose of reality that will please an audience fed up with glossier fares that provide little substance. Saili has substance, but it also has shortcomings that should be looked upon as opportunities for future filmmakers, especially writer-director Ram Babu Gurung". The Annapurna Express praised the film, writing "Saili is exactly what cinema should be: a piece of art".
