= Jhumkee =

Nepali film

- झुम्की
- Directed by: Apil Bista
- Written by: Ram Babu Gurung
- Based on: Violence against women
- Produced by: Apil Bista Films; Cinema Arts; Niraj Singh Bista; Pradeep Acharya
- Starring: Dayahang Rai; Rishma Gurung; Malina Joshi; Manoj RC; Rabindra Singh Baniya; Nischal Basnet; Ankeet Khadka
- Cinematography: Shailendra Dhoj Kari
- Edited by: Nimesh Shrestha
- Music by: Kali Prasad Baskota; Hemanta Rana
- Production companies: Cinema Arts; Apil Bista Films
- Release date: 23 September 2016
- Running time: 133 minutes
- Country: Nepal
- Language: Nepali

Jhumkee (Nepali: झुम्कि) is a 2016 Nepali film directed and produced Apil Bista under the banner of Apil Films P. Ltd. and it is based on features suspense story on Women Violence in Nepal. The film was mostly acclaimed by critics for its storytelling and suspense.

== Plot ==
Jhumkee (Nepali: झुम्की) is a 2016 Nepalese film directed and produced by Apil Bista in collaboration with Cinema Arts.The film features Manoj RC, Malina Joshi, Rishma Gurung, Dayahang Rai, in lead roles.

Originally set to release on 25 August 2016, Jhumkee team delayed its release date to September 4 due to technical problem in post-production.

== Cast ==
- Dayahang Rai
- Rishma Gurung as Dewaki
- Malina Joshi
- Manoj RC
- Bholaraj Sapkota
- Bijay Baral
- Pramod Agrahari
- Rabindra Singh Baniya
- Sushmita Karki
- Prem Barsha Khadka
- Nischal Basnet Police Officer
- Samten Bhutia
- Bisharad Basnet

== Songs ==
All tracks are written by Kali Prasad Baskota.

No.	Title	Length
1.	"Sakhiye"	3:50
Total length:		3:50
