= Purna Bahadur Ko Sarangi =

2024 Nepali language film directed by Saroj Poudel

- Theatrical release poster
- Nepali: पूर्णबहादुर को सारङ्गी
- Directed by: Saroj Poudel
- Screenplay by: Mahesh Dawadi
- Story by: Saroj Poudel
- Produced by: Binod Poudel; Ramesh Chaulagain
- Starring: Bijay Baral; Mukun Bhusal; Prakash Saput; Anjana Baraili
- Cinematography: Shivaram Shrestha
- Edited by: Surendra Z Poudel
- Music by: Rohit Shakya
- Production company: Seven Seas Cinema
- Release date: 31 October 2024
- Running time: 143 minutes
- Country: Nepal
- Language: Nepali
- Budget: est.रू1.30 crore
- Box office: est.रू70.22 crore

Purna Bahadur Ko Sarangi (Nepali: पूर्णबहादुर को सारङ्गी, transl. Purna Bahadur's Sarangi) is a 2024 Nepalese social-drama film directed by Saroj Poudel, from a screenplay written by Mahesh Dawadi. The film features Bijay Baral, Mukun Bhusal, Anjana Baraili and Prakash Saput. It was produced by Binod Poudel and Ramesh Chaulagain under the banner of Seven Seas Cinema.

The film follows the life of Purna Bahadur, a Sarangi-playing father from the marginalized Gandharva community, who strives to provide a better future for his son through education despite facing poverty and social discrimination. The story portrays themes of love, sacrifice, and resilience, highlighting the deep bond between father and son as they navigate life's hardships.

The film was released in cinemas on October 31, 2024, on Lakshmi Puja, the third day of Tihar in Nepal. The film received positive response from critics for the performance of the cast, particularly Bijay Baral, the story, the direction, and the emotional weight. The film was an all time blockbuster at the box office. With an unprecedented performance at the box office, the film emerged as the highest-grossing film of all time in Nepal in just under two weeks. It also set the record of being the first ever film to cross the रू30 crore and रू40 crore mark in Nepal box office history.

== Plot ==
The story is told in flashback, beginning with Kamal Gandharva, now an adult, reminiscing about his father, Purna Bahadur.

Purna Bahadur is a poor man from the Gandharva community in rural Nepal, who earns a living by travelling and playing the Sarangi. Purna marries Batuli, who deliberately loses a singing contest to him because she has a crush on him, much to her family's dismay. Initially happy, Batuli soon becomes frustrated with their extreme poverty and the lack of respect the Gandharva community receives.

When they have a son, Kanchha, Purna initially tries to teach him the family tradition of playing the Sarangi. However, Batuli passionately believes that education is the only way for their son to escape their destined hardship. Batuli attempts to take Kanchha to the city for better life with an old friend Harke, but a misunderstanding and her son's fear cause Kanchha return to his father.

Influenced by his wife's words and his own struggles, Purna Bahadur makes the pivotal decision to enroll his son in school, legally naming him Kamal Gandharva, and dedicating himself to ensuring his son receives a full education. Purna Bahadur makes immense sacrifices to make Kamal excel academically. Purna sells his possessions and endures severe hardships to pay for Kamal's studies, after Kamal passes his entrance exam for MBBS. In a devastating turn, Purna Bahadur is injured and loses his voice after a brawl, which snatches his livelihood. In the final act of sacrifice, he sells the beloved Sarangi itself, the symbol of his livelihood and heritage, to fund the last of Kamal's education.

While in the city, Kamal is unaware of his father's final sacrifices, including his lost voice. He eventually completes his medical degree and returns to the village, eager to treat his father. However, Purna Bahadur has already died. The illiterate father, who couldn't read the letters on the newspaper announcing his son's graduation, dies without knowing his life's dream of raising a doctor was fulfilled. Kamal's devastating discovery brings the story of his father's endless love and struggle to a heartbreaking end.

In the present, when Kamal's daughter inquires about her grandmother Batuli, Kamal gently tells her that the time has not arrived yet to unfold that complex part of the family's past.

== Cast ==
- Bijay Baral as Purna Bahadur Gandharva
- Anjana Baraili as Batuli, Purna Bahadur's wife
- Prakash Saput as Kamal Gandharva (Kanchha), Purna Bahadur's son
  - Swayam KC as young Kamal
- Mukun Bhusal as Bire, Purna's cousin
- Buddhi Tamang as Dhakre Maila
- Maotse Gurung as Pasale Saahu
- Desh Bhakta Khanal as Purna Bahadur's father
- Bhola Raj Sapkota as Teacher
- Binod Neupane as Harke

== Soundtrack ==
The music is composed by Prashant Siwakoti while the background score is provided by Rohit Shakya. The first song from the film titled "Kadhekuri" was released on 15 September, followed by "Dainey Hataima" on 28 September, "Maijharo" on 3 October, "Raiya Chandiko" on 23 October and "Notaile" on 7 November.

All music is composed by Prashant Siwakoti.

No.	Title	Lyrics	Singer	Length
1.	"Kadhekuri"	Prashant Siwakoti	Prashant Siwakoti	3:15
2.	"Dainey Hataima"	Prashant Siwakoti	Prashant Siwakoti	3:45
3.	"Maijharo"	Prashant Siwakoti	Prashant Siwakoti	3:55
4.	"Raiya Chandiko"	Navaraj Panta	Ashish Aviral; Melina Rai	8:47
5.	"Notaile"	Prashant Siwakoti	Prashant Siwakoti	3:09

== Reception ==
Film received praise from the critics especially for Baral's performance but faced some criticism for its over reliance on drama. Rishika Dhakal of The Kathmandu Post reviewed the film saying, "Purna Bahadurko Sarangi is a missed opportunity for a more nuanced approach to storytelling, with its heavy focus on melodrama and exaggeration of emotions, which ultimately detracts from the powerful themes of caste and marginalization." A critic from NepalPress said "Despite its shortcomings, Sarangi is a powerful movie, portraying the intimate relationship between father and son, and will resonate with anyone who understands the struggles of both."

A critic from dhurbashrestha.com.np said "The film Sarangi is truly a battle of ideas, in which a Dalit parent like Purna Bahadur (Purne) struggles against poverty, social injustice, and humiliation in search of his self-respect." The film powerfully portrays the oppression of the Dalit community, their cultural identity, and their struggle for self-respect. Sarangi is not just a story of Dalits, but a story of the deep social reality of Nepali society, a story of change, and a search for self-respect. "

== Box office ==
Despite a low opening weekend at the box office, the film performed exceptionally well at the box office thereafter, grossing over रू8.25 crore in Nepal in its first week due to excellent word of mouth. The film earned रू17.98 crore crore in 10 days, smashing several records including the highest gross in a single day for a film, with रू3.89 crore on second Saturday. In just two weeks, the film minted रू27.35 crore setting two major records: becoming the highest grossing Nepali film ever, surpassing Kabaddi 4: The Final Match and simultaneously becoming the highest grossing film in Nepal, finally dethroning the seven-year reign of Baahubali 2: The Conclusion. The official lifetime domestic box office collection of the film in Nepal is रू46.87 crore according to the FDB, emerging as the industry hit.

The film earned रू23.35 crore from seven international markets after three weeks, becoming the highest grossing Nepali film internationally. The highest contribution was from North America with US$922,000 followed by Australia with A$884,000. The film grossed US$184,950 in the Middle East, NZ$42,940 in New Zealand, €6,300 in Belgium, €9,600 in Denmark and €3,200 in Norway. The total worldwide gross of the film stands at रू70.22 crore, becoming the only Nepali film ever to cross रू50 crore milestone worldwide.

== See also ==
- List of highest grossing films in Nepal
- List of Nepalese films
