= Pension Patta =

- Theatrical release poster
- Directed by: Maotse Gurung
- Written by: Maotse Gurung
- Produced by: Min Konme Gurung; Bhoj Bahadur Gurung; Maya Gurung; Sapana Gurung
- Starring: Dayahang Rai; Wilson Bikram Rai; Buddhi Tamang; Gaumaya Gurung; Pashupati Rai
- Cinematography: Sushan Prajapati
- Edited by: Nimesh Shrestha; Kerr D. Koinch Linuch
- Music by: Rohit Shakya
- Production company: Maotse Gurung Films
- Distributed by: RR Film Production
- Release date: 11 September 2026
- Running time: 129 minutes
- Country: Nepal
- Language: Nepali
- Budget: est.रू2.5 crore (US$170,000)
- Box office: est.रू10.36 crore (US$690,000)

Pension Patta (Nepali: पेन्सन पट्टा) is a 2026 Nepalese social-drama film written and directed by Maotse Gurung and produced under the banner of Maotse Gurung Films. Starring Dayahang Rai, Gaumaya Gurung, Pashupati Rai, Buddhi Tamang, Wilson Bikram Rai, and Late Sunil Thapa, the film explores themes of Lahure (foreign military service) culture, family inheritance, unexpressed love, and bureaucratic hardships faced by ex-Gurkha families in rural Nepal.

Released theatrically in Nepal on September 11, 2026, the film emerged as a major commercial hit. It received generally positive reviews from critics, who praised its grounded storytelling, emotional sincerity, music, and performances. Audience praised the film's heartfelt portrayal of Lahure culture, sacrifice, and societal realities which made it a compelling family drama.

== Synopsis ==
Rajan Gurung lives with his mother, Chhalu, in a modest settlement along the banks of the Khudi River. Following the sudden death of his father, Ganga Bahadur, a former Indian Army soldier who leaves behind mounting debts, the family faces severe financial distress when creditors arrive to claim their dues.

Seeking to secure his mother's rightful widow pension to pay off the debts and sustain the household, Rajan discovers an error in the official names and documentation recorded on his late father's pension papers (pension patta). His quest to rectify the paperwork leads him to uncover hidden family secrets, revealing that his father had maintained an earlier relationship and left behind unclear legal documentation involving an elder aunt. As disputes over entitlement and family legacy unfold between the two households, Rajan embarks on an emotional journey through Gurung cultural traditions, societal expectations, and quiet personal sacrifice, ultimately reshaping his understanding of love, duty, and his father's past.

== Cast ==
- Dayahang Rai
- Gaumaya Gurung
- Wilson Bikram Rai
- Buddhi Tamang
- Pashupati Rai
- Sunil Thapa
- Beeshwas Gurung
- Maya Gurung
- Pushkar Gurung
- Loonibha Tuladhar

== Production ==
Director Maotse Gurung conceived the idea for Pension Patta roughly fifteen years prior to its production, inspired by real-life legal and social struggles faced by mothers and widows in Gurung and Lahure communities who were denied pension benefits due to documentation discrepancies. Gurung co-wrote the screenplay with Suraj Tamu and Kerr D. Koinch Linuch.

Principal photography took place primarily in and around the scenic Gurung village of Tangting in the Kaski district near Pokhara. The film was produced by Min Konme Gurung, Bhoj Bahadur Gurung, Maya Gurung, and Sapana Gurung under Maotse Gurung Films. Cinematography was handled by Sushan Prajapati, with editing by Nimesh Shrestha, art direction by Raju Yakcha, and choreography by Kamal Bahadur Gurung.

== Soundtrack ==
The film's score was provided by Rohit Shakya, and songs were composed by Manoj Thapa Magar, Shiva Baraili and Suraj Tamu. Tracks released ahead of and alongside the film include "Juni Jaala", "Madi Gayo Gandaki", and "Aina Herera Kapal Korera".

No.	Title	Lyrics	Music	Singer(s)	Length
1.	"Juni Jaala"	Hark Saud	Manoj Thapa Magar	Sarun Gurung, Raj Bahadur Gurung, Usha Gurung, Priya Gurung	6:32
2.	"Aina Herera Kapal Korera"	Suraj Tamu	Suraj Tamu	Shanti Shree Pariyar, Suraj Tamu	5:55
3.	"Madi Gayo Gandaki"	Shiva Baraili	Shiva Baraili	Shiva Baraili, Surakshya Sentury	4:50
Total length:					17:17

== Box office ==
Despite an understated opening day, Pension Patta gained significant momentum through strong audience word-of-mouth. According to official box office figures published by the Film Development Board, it grossed approximately रू10.34 crore after two months and ranking among the highest-grossing Nepali films of 2026.
