= Dayarani =

- Promotional poster
- दयारानी
- Directed by: Maotse Gurung
- Written by: Maotse Gurung
- Produced by: Mohan Gurung; New IT Venture; Kiran Gurung
- Starring: Dayahang Rai; Diya Pun; Bijay Baral
- Cinematography: Shailendra D. Karki
- Edited by: Rajen Puwer; Nimesh Shrestha
- Music by: Rajan Raj Siwakoti; Binod Baniya; Manoj Thapa Magar
- Production companies: Maoste Gurung Films; Baasuri Films
- Distributed by: Station 5
- Release date: February 9, 2024
- Country: Nepal
- Box office: रु2.5 crore

Dayarani (Nepali: दयारानी) is a 2024 Nepali family-drama film written and directed by Maotse Gurung. The film is the directorial debut for actor Gurung. It's produced by Mohan Gurung, New IT Venture, Kiran Gurung, Kendra Limbu, Maj. Khusiman Gurung MVO, Capt. Surendra Gurung & Capt. Surya Prakash Gurung under the banner of Maotse Gurung Films and Baasuri Films. It features Dayahang Rai, Diya Pun & Bijay Baral in pivotal roles. The story revolves around the poignant journey of a couple grappling with the challenges of infertility.

The film was released on February 9, 2024.

== Synopsis ==
A family drama that revolves around the poignant journey of a couple grappling with the challenges of infertility. Despite societal expectations and complex family dynamics, the film beautifully portrays the unwavering love and support between the husband and wife as they navigate the emotional and often times hilarious rollercoaster of trying to conceive.

== Cast ==
- Dayahang Rai
- Diya Pun
- Bijay Baral
- Pramish Gurung
- Shrisha Kunwar
- Puskar Gurung
- Nayan Gurung
