= Kabaddi (2014 film) =

2014 Nepali film by Ram Babu Gurung

- Theatrical release poster
- Nepali: कबड्डी
- Directed by: Ram Babu Gurung
- Written by: Ram Babu Gurung
- Produced by: Nischal Basnet; Sunil Chand Rauniyar
- Starring: Dayahang Rai; Nischal Basnet; Rishma Gurung; Buddhi Tamang; Bijay Baral
- Cinematography: Purushottam Pradhan
- Edited by: Nimesh Shrestha
- Music by: Rohit Shakya
- Production company: Black Horse Pictures
- Distributed by: Popcorn Pictures
- Release date: 25 April 2014
- Running time: 110 minutes
- Country: Nepal
- Language: Nepali
- Budget: रू35 lakhs
- Box office: रू7.34 crore

Kabaddi (Nepali: कबड्डी) is a 2014 Nepalese romantic comedy-drama film written and directed by Ram Babu Gurung. The film is produced by Nischal Basnet and Sunil Chand Rauniyar under the banners of Black Horse Pictures in association with Cinema Art and Media Port. It stars Dayahang Rai, Nischal Basnet, Rishma Gurung, Bijay Baral and Buddhi Tamang. The film was released on April 25, 2014, with extremely positive reviews from critics and audience for its rawness, screenplay, performances, and direction. It is the first installment of Kabaddi franchise.

Set in the Naurikot village of Mustang district, the film centers on Kaji, a young aimless man who is obsessed with marrying his cousin, Maiya, by any means. However she constantly rejects him as her dream is to pursue higher education in Kathmandu city. Their conflict takes a dramatic turn after the arrival of Bibek, a charismatic visitor from the city.

It became an all time blockbuster at the box office and remains a cult classic film of Nepali cinema. The film is also considered a landmark in modern Nepali cinema filmmaking. The film has multiple sequels. Kabaddi Kabaddi was released in 27 November 2015, and it also became a huge success critically and commercially. Its third part, Kabaddi Kabaddi Kabaddi, was released on 20 September 2019. Its fourth part, Kabaddi 4: The Final Match hit the theatres on 27 May 2022 to emerge as an all time blockbuster.

== Plot ==
Kaji, a third-standard-failed young man from Naurikot village in Mustang, dreams of marrying Maiya, the daughter of his maternal uncle, by any means. Maiya, a student of high school, on the other hand, is peeved by his idiotic behaviors. This rejection from Maiya always disappoints Kaji but never disheartens him. Supported by his two childhood friends B.K and Chhantyal, he finally decides to marry Maiya through a capture marriage, which is illegal but still practiced by some ethnic communities in Mustang.

To find her long-gone father and continue her studies in Kathmandu, Maiya elopes with a visitor in the village, Bibek. Inflamed by her disappearance, Kaji heads to Kathmandu in search of Maiya and finds himself trapped in a city conspiracy. Bibek turns out to be a broken man trying to take revenge against Ambir, Maiya's father. Though Kaji succeeds in getting Maiya safely back home, the duo's love story still fails to move forward, with Maiya attending high school and Kaji waiting outside the school with a bouquet as usual, with a hope she would reciprocate his feelings one day.

== Cast ==
- Dayahang Rai as Bir Kaji Sherchan (Kaji)
- Nischal Basnet as Bibek
- Rishma Gurung as Maiya Gauchan (Maiya)
- Bijaya Baral as Bir Kaji Bishowkarma (B.K.)
- Buddhi Tamang as Buddhi Lal Magar (Chhantyal)
- Rajan Khatiwada as Jiten
- Aruna Karki as Juna Gauchan, Maiya's mother
- Sishir Bangdel as Ambir Gauchan, Maiya's father
- Pashupati Rai as Gauri, Chhantyal's wife
- Kamal Mani Nepal as B.K's father
- Puskar Gurung as Mukhiya, Kaji's father
- Kabita Ale as Kaji's mother
- Upendra Subba as Jhakri
- Junu Bista as Ambir's girlfriend
- Hikmat Thapaliya as Gatthe
- Gobinda Rai as Pardeshi Kanchha

== Soundtrack ==
No.	Title	Lyrics	Music	Singer(s)	Length
1.	"Maya Khai Kasle Bujhyo"	Bibek Ojha	Aadha Sur	Suresh Kumar Chhetri	3:46
Total length:					3:46

== Box office ==
It was an all time blockbuster at the box office. The film grossed रू7.34 crore to become the highest grossing film of all time in Nepal. Made on a low budget, it was one of the most profitable films in Nepali cinema.
