= Bijay Baral =

Nepalese actor

- बिजय बराल
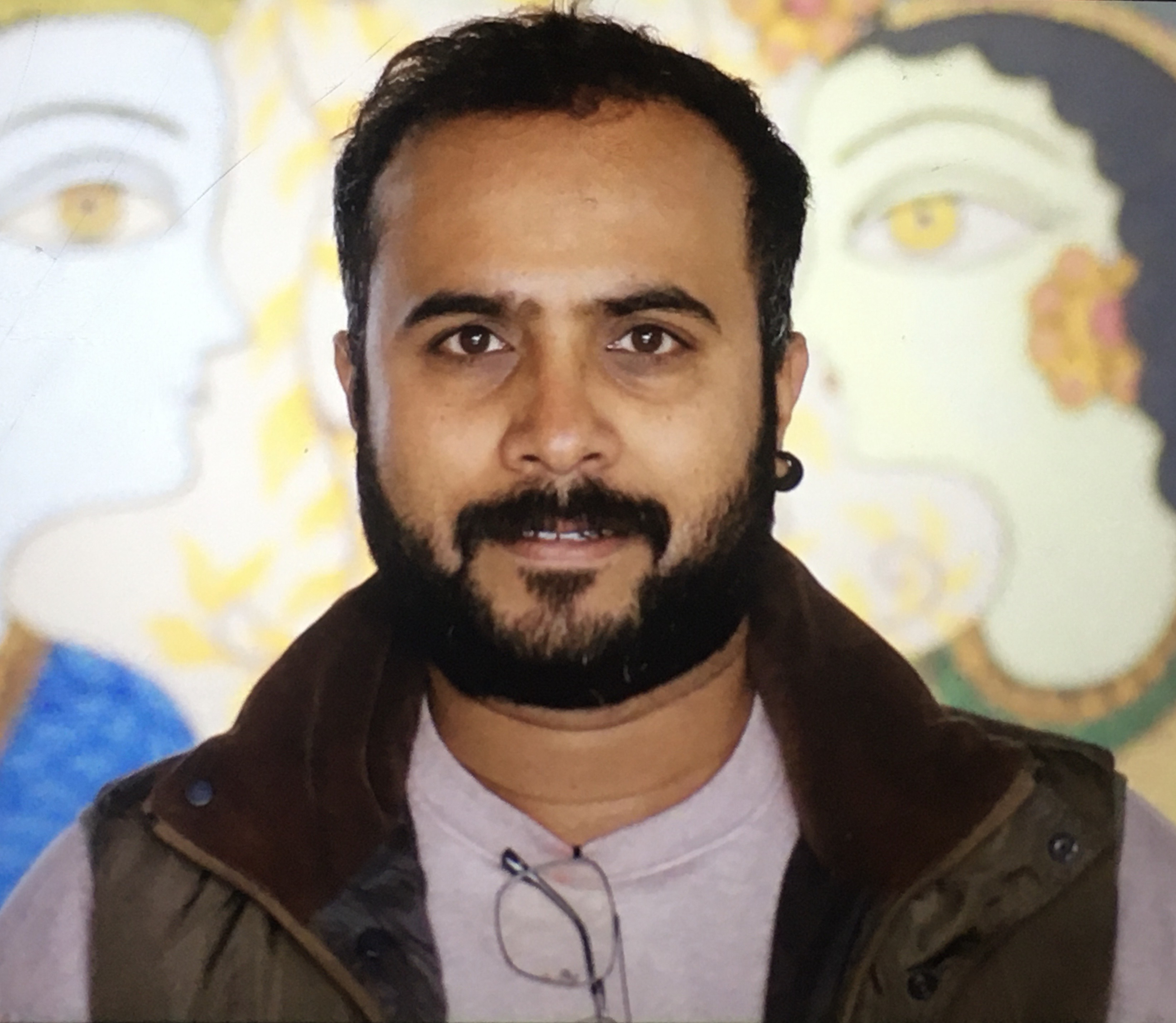
- Baral in 2023
- Born: 28 November 1988 (age 37); Sarlahi District, Nepal
- Other name: Biju
- Citizenship: Nepal
- Education: Diploma; MBS Running
- Occupations: Actor, singer
- Years active: 2010–present
- Known for: Purna Bahadur Ko Sarangi (2024)
- Spouse: Pramila Khanal
- Children: 1

Bijay Baral (Nepali: विजय बराल) is a Nepalese actor and poet known for his work in Nepali cinema. He made his debut in 2013 with the film Chhadke. He worked as B.K. in film Kabaddi (2014). He worked on the film Kabaddi 4: The Final Match (2022), which became the highest-grossing Nepali film of all time. He starred in the film Jaari (2023) and Purna Bahadur ko Sarangi(2024) both of which went on to become one of the highest-grossing Nepali films with later emerging as his biggest success as a male lead breaking several records. He is also active in the theatre scene, mostly acting in plays at Mandala Theatre.

== Personal life ==
Bijay Baral was born in Sarlahi, which is located in Terai region of Nepal. He is married to Pramila Khanal, they have one son name Prajay Khanal Baral.

== Career ==
Baral had his first role in the movie Chhadke in 2013 and Kabaddi in 2014. In 2015, he acted in Kabaddi Kabaddi, the sequel of Kabaddi, for which he was also nominated for best actor in a comic role. In 2016, he acted in Jhumkee, and in the same year, he acted in How Funny. In 2022, he acted in the record-breaking Kabaddi 4: The Final Match, which became the highest grossing Nepali film of all time, collecting over 22.73 crore. In 2023, he acted in Jaari, which earned 15 crore in its first three weeks of release and became one of the highest-grossing Nepali films.

== Filmography ==
Credited as actor, unless otherwise noted.

Key
†	Denotes films that have not yet been released

Year	Film	Role	Notes	Ref(s)
2013	Karkash			
2013	Maun			
2014	Kabaddi	B.K.		
2015	Kabaddi Kabaddi	B.K.		
2016	How Funny			
2016	Jhumkee			
2018	Mr Jholay			
2018	Hurray			
2018	Pandit Bajeko Lauri			
2018	Mr Virgin	Pavitra Prasad		
2019	Kabaddi Kabaddi Kabaddi	B.K.		
2019	Machha Machha			
2022	Kabaddi 4: The Final Match	B.K.		
2023	Harry Ki Pyari			
2023	Jaari	Mangal Singh		
2023	Dimag Kharab	Bale		
2024	Dayarani			
2024	Hattichhap	Chhal Bahadur		
2024	The Unbreakable Agastya			
2024	Degree Maila: MA 3rd Class			
2024	Aankha			
2024	Behuli from Meghauli			
2024	Purna Bahadur Ko Sarangi	Purna Bahadur		
2025	Laaj Sharanam			
2025	Anjila			
2025	Rajagunj			
2025	Yo Man Ta Mero Nepali Ho			
2025	Janai Harayeko Manchhe			
2025	Baristha Balaram	Balaram		
2025	Jaari 2	Mangal Singh		
2026	Malati Mangale			

== Awards ==
Year	Ceramony	Category	Film	Result	Ref(s)
2023	Captivating Creation Award	Best actor		Won	
2025	International Nepali Film Award	Best actor	Purna Bahadurko Sarangi	Won	
