= Nilu Doma Sherpa =

Nepalese film director

- निलु डोमा शेर्पा
- Nilu Doma Sherpa during the filming of How Funny
- Born: 27 May 1985; Kathmandu, Nepal
- Died: 1 July 2017 (aged 32); Baluwatar, Kathmandu
- Body discovered: 1 July 2017
- Resting place: Swayambhunath, Kathmandu; 27°42′35″N 85°20′55″E
- Other name: Nilu
- Years active: 2004–2017

Nilu Dolma Sherpa (1985 – 1 July 2017) was a Nepali film director. She directed the film How Funny, and earned accolades for her short title, kagaj. She died in 2017 due to cardiac arrest.

== Filmography ==
Year	Title	Role
2014	Jholay	Choreographer
2014	Punte Parade	
2016	How Funny	Director
2017	Anaagat	Producer

== Death ==
Nilu was found unconscious in her home in Baluwatar. She was taken to TU Teaching Hospital, where she was pronounced dead.

=== Legacy ===
After the death of Sherpa there has been a Scholarship announced in the memory of the Sherpa.
