= Rajja Rani =

- Film poster
- Directed by: Yam Thapa
- Written by: Yam Thapa
- Produced by: Ramesh MK Poudel; Aryan Poudel
- Starring: Najir Hussain; Keki Adhikari; Rekha Thapa
- Cinematography: Purushottam Pradhan
- Edited by: Chandan Datta
- Music by: Deepak Sharma (Musician); Tara Prakash Limbu
- Production companies: Aryan Films Production; Kindle studio
- Release date: 5 January 2018
- Running time: 138 minutes
- Country: Nepal
- Languages: Nepali; Maithili

Rajja Rani is a 2018 Nepali romantic comedy film directed by Yam Thapa and produced by Ramesh MK Poudel. The film features Najir Hussain and Keki Adhikari in lead roles. It was released on 5 January 2018. The film has also been dubbed in Maithili version.

Rajja Rani is a story inspired by true incidents in Terai region of Nepal. The film touches on the issue of child marriage.

== Plot ==
Rajja struggles for his love for Rani against the obstacles in their love due to the social and cultural values.

== Cast ==
- Keki Adhikari as Rani
- Najir Hussain as Rajja Yadav
- Kameshor Chaurasiya as Rajja's Friend
- Deepak Kshetri as Rani's Father
- Laxmi Bardewa
