= Purano Dunga =

2016 Nepali film by Ram Babu Gurung

- Directed by: Ram Babu Gurung
- Written by: Ram Babu Gurung
- Story by: Maotse Gurung
- Produced by: Raunak Bikram Kandel, Om Chand Rauniyar, Arjun Karki, Prakash Gurung, Dhan Bahadur Gurung
- Starring: Dayahang Rai, Priyanka Karki, Maotse Gurung, Menuka Pradhan, Buddhi Tamang,
- Edited by: Nimesh Shrestha
- Music by: Kali Prasad Baskota
- Production companies: Cinema Art Production, Maotse Gurung Films
- Distributed by: HighlightsNepal
- Release date: 25 November 2016 (Nepal)
- Running time: 1h 42m
- Country: Nepal
- Language: Nepali

Purano Dunga (English: Old Boat) is a 2016 Nepali slice of life film directed by Ram Babu Gurung and produced by Raunak Bikram Kandel, Prakash Gurung, Om Chand Rauniyar and Dhan Bahadur Gurung in association with Cinema Arts. The film stars Dayahang Rai, and Priyanka Karki in the lead roles as a couple, with Maotse Gurung and Menuka Pradhan in the supporting role as brother and sister in law.

== Plot ==
Purano Dunga tells the story of two Bhujel brothers - Bhakta Bahadur, the older brother played by Maotse Gurung, makes his living by rowing his boat across Lake Begnas, while Batase, played by Dayahang Rai, idles his life away in the city. One day, Batase asks for his share of the family fortune wherein he asks for the boat. The story unfolds as Bhakta is forced to give up the boat to his brother and starts to struggle financially as the boat was his only livelihood. One day, a local villager buys a boat because Batase took away the village's only boat. This angers Bhakta and he destroys the boat, and then buys an old leaky boat from the money he had saved, but, before he can repair it, the owner of the destroyed boat calls the police and they arrive and arrest him. As they leave, his wife Manu sees her husband taken away and decides to follow him on the leaky old boat despite him telling her not to. Suddenly, the boat starts sinking and she jumps into the lake; seeing this, Bhakta jumps in as well to save her but as they reach the shore his wife dies. The film closes as Batase watches his brother Bhakta as he leaves his home with his baby on his back.

== Cast ==
- Dayahang Rai as Batashe
- Priyanka Karki as Chandra
- Maotse Gurung as Bhakta Bahadur Bhujel
- Menuka Pradhan as Manamaya/ Manu
- Sudam Ck as Dohori Sau
- Purnima Gurung
- Maniram Pokhrel
- Buddhi Tamang as Bideshi

== Soundtrack ==
No.	Title	Singer(s)	Length
1.	"Nira"	Kali Prasad Baskota	3:09
2.	"Rumani Rang"	Anupam Sharma, Archana Sharma	3:32
3.	"Maajhi"	Kali Prasad Baskota	3:39

== Awards ==
Awards received by Purano Dunga Team
Ceremony	Category	Recipient	Result
5th NFDC Award	Best Story	Ram Babu Gurung and Upendra Subba	Won
5th NFDC Award	Best Cinematography	Shailendra D Karki	Won
5th NFDC Award	Best Music	Kali Prasad Baskota	Won
5th NFDC Award	Best Actor In Supporting Role	Maotse Gurung	Won
5th NFDC Award	Best Actress in supporting role	Menuka Pradhan	Won
Film Critics Society of Nepal (FISCON)	Best Actor	Maotse Gurung	Won
