= Appa (2019 film) =

- movie poster
- Directed by: Anmol Gurung
- Produced by: Ruden Sada Lepcha
- Starring: Dayahang Rai; Siddhant Raj Tamang; Allona Kabo Lepcha; Tulsi Ghimire; Aruna Karki
- Cinematography: Shailendra D. Karki
- Release dates: 28 June 2019 (Nepal); 5 July 2019 (India)
- Countries: India; Nepal
- Language: Nepali

Appa (Nepali: आप्पा; English: Father) is a Nepali-language film written and directed by Anmol Gurung and produced by Ruden Sada Lepcha. The film features Dayahang Rai, Siddhant Raj Tamang and Allona Kabo Lepcha. The film was released on 28 June 2019 in Nepal and on 5 July 2019 in India.

== Cast ==
- Dayahang Rai as Birkhe/Appa
- Siddhant Raj Tamang as Sid
- Allona Kabo Lepcha as Kavya

== Production ==
The shooting of the film began on 25 April 2018 at the historic Ghoom Railway Station in Darjeeling, while portions of the movie were shot in places like Sandakphu and Kalimpong.

== Reception ==
Diwakar Pyakurel writes in OnlineKhabar that "the uniqueness of the setting is not the only strength of the movie. It presents a complex social drama on the universal theme of parental love beyond blood, but the narrative flow is so smooth and comprehensive that the audience easily understands the message" and gave it a rating of 3 out of 5. Rupak Risal of Moviemandu commended the "other love story [of the teenagers] within, good cinematography work and performances of the young actors" in the film but wrote what the film "lacks the most as a love story and drama is its scope. It doesn’t want to explore human hearts and excavate to the core to explore the human nature" and gave the film a rating of 2.5 out of 5. Gokarna Gautam of Nepal wrote that the film makes an honest attempt to explore the father-son relationship but does not reach the emotional depths required. The songs of the film are good but the plot is weak and gave the film a rating of 2 out of 5.

== Soundtrack ==
Track	Music	Lyrics	Singers
Hawa Sarara	Anmol Gurung	Umesh Upama	Thupden Bhutia and Snehshree Thapa
Sanjha Parey Pachi	Anmol Gurung	Anmol Gurung	Snehshree Thapa and Anmol Gurung
Amala	Sushant Gautam and SD Yogi	Hark Saud	Melina Rai and SD Yogi
Sawaney Jhari	Anmol Gurung	Umesh Upama	Bigyan Baraily
