= Upendra Subba =

Nepali poet and actor

- उपेन्द्र सुब्बा (Nepali) ᤀᤢᤐᤣᤴᤍᤪ ᤒᤜᤠᤍᤢᤖ ᤀᤠᤅᤍᤣᤶᤒᤣ (Limbu)
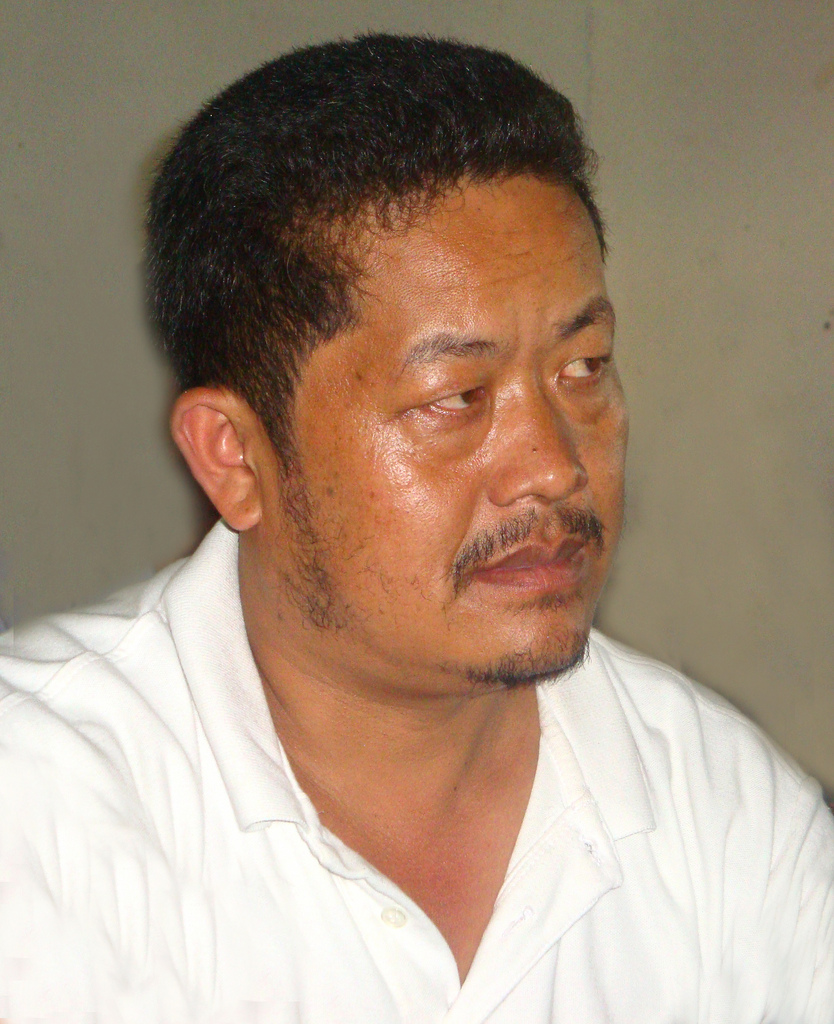
- Born: Upendra Bahadur Angdembe Limbu; September 26, 1971 (age 54); Angsarang, Panchthar, Nepal
- Occupations: Poet, lyricist, writer, director
- Known for: Kabaddi 4: The Final Match, Jaari, Mansarra
- Notable work: Kabaddi; Kabaddi Kabaddi; Lato Pahad
- Movement: Srijanshil Arajakta
- Spouse: Kalpana Lawati (Limbu)
- Children: 3 daughters
- Awards: Padmashree Sahitya Puraskar

Upendra Bahadur Angdembe Limbu who is known as Upendra Subba (Nepali: उपेन्द्र सुब्बा) is a Nepali poet, lyricist, writer, and film director. He is one of the initiators of the movement called Srijanshil Arajakta (Creative Anarchy) along with Rajan Mukarung and Hangyug Agyat.

== Early life ==
Subba was born in Angsarang-8, Panchthar, an eastern hilly district. His birth name was Upendra Bahadur Angdembe.

In 1997, he moved to Kathmandu city from Damak to become a songwriter. His songwriting had started to see success with music composed by Shantiram Rai. His songs were sung by Deep Shrestha, Robin Sharma, Ananda Karki, Yam Baral and won some competitions. He became convinced that song recording was expensive and that the music industry was heading towards the directions unlike his taste.

== Literary career ==
Around this time, he met Rajan Mukarung and Hangyug Agyat. They jointly started a literary movement called Srijanshil Arajakta (meaning creative anarchy).

He credits their joint movement for his success in writing. He claimed that the success of Lato Pahad was because Rajan Mukarung paved path for him by success of his novels Hechhakuppa and winning Madan Puraskar with Damini Bhir.

He visited Hong Kong in 2016 to attend a program by Critics Society. He has visited Malaysia and Singapore in literary programs.

== Published works ==
=== Poetry Collection ===
- Dada mathi ko Gham jun ra Gadtirka Raake Bhut haru (2002)
- Hongrayo Bhog ra Pangra (2004)
- Kholako gita ra purana kavitaharu (2013)
- Desh Khojdai Jaada (2017)

=== Short stories collection ===
- Lato Pahad (2014) (compilation of stories) adapted as movie Keba Kokma

=== Music Album ===
- Jiwan Akhir Ke Nai Ho Ra (2006) (Music Album)

== Film career ==
For his film writing, he gives credit to director Ram Babu Gurung. They have collaborated hit movies, including Kabaddi, Kabaddi Kabaddi. His first story was Keba Kokma (Lato Pahad), in Limbu language, directed by Ravi Serma.

Lato Pahad was adapted as a theatrical play.

He made brief appearances in Kabaddi and Kabaddi Kabaddi, but deems those appearances as forced upon him by his friends.

He made his directorial debut through 2023 film Jaari, which he also wrote.

== Filmography ==
Key
| † | Denotes films that have not yet been released |

| Year | Title | Role | Credited as | | | Notes | Ref(s) |
| Year | Title | Role | Actor | Writer | Director | Notes | Ref(s) |
|---|---|---|---|---|---|---|---|
| 2014 | Kabaddi | Jhakri | Yes | No | No | Debut | |
| 2015 | Kabaddi Kabaddi | Jhakri | No | Yes | No | | |
| 2016 | Taandro | —N/a | No | Yes | No | | |
| 2016 | Purano Dunga | —N/a | No | Screenplay | No | | |
| 2019 | Kabaddi Kabaddi Kabaddi | —N/a | No | Yes | No | | |
| 2022 | Kabaddi 4: The Final Match | Jhakri | Yes | Yes | No | | |
| 2023 | Jaari | —N/a | No | Yes | Yes | Directorial debut, special appearance | |
| 2024 | Mansarra | —N/a | No | Yes | Yes | Uncredited cameo | |
| 2025 | Jaari 2 | —N/a | No | Yes | Yes | | |

== Awards ==
- Nepali Pratibha Award by Nepali Pratibha Pratisthan, UK, 2010
- Padmashree Sahitya Puraskar in 2015 Lato Pahad 2015
- National award for best script writer for movie Kabaddi in 2015
