= Lappan Chhappan =

Nepali gangster film

- Theatrical release poster
- Nepali: लप्पन छप्पन
- Directed by: Mukunda Bhatta
- Written by: Prabesh Poudel Prakash Jung Shah
- Produced by: Damber Bahadur Chand
- Starring: Saugat Malla; Dayahang Rai; Arpan Thapa; Barsha Siwakoti; Devu Shrestha; (Raju Lama)
- Release date: 24 March 2017 (Nepal)
- Running time: 155 minutes
- Country: Nepal
- Language: Nepali

Lappan Chhappan, is a 2017 Nepali gangster film directed by Mukunda Bhatta and written by Prabesh Poudel and Prakash Jung Shah. The film was produced by Damber Bahadur Chand and co-produced by Indra Prasad Kharel. Its title is inspired by the song titled "Lappan Chappan" from the 2015 movie Kabaddi Kabaddi. The meaning of the title refers to the act of dishonesty or deception. The majority of the film was shot in Belgium. Lappan Chhappan was released on 24 March 2017.

== Plot ==
In Kathmandu, the capital city of Nepal, two young hackers are living their life until they meet with Baby (Barsha Siwakoti), whose purse and car they have stolen. Baby gives them work to hack the account of a mafia named Baka (Saugat Malla) who is also her boyfriend. In another part of the story it is shown that there is a local goon named Chamero (Arpan Thapa). Chamero is gay and has a special worker named Raju and another man, Mr. Tamang (Dayahang Rai), working as a reporter. In reality, Tamang is actually an inspector and is ordered by the police to join the Chamero gang and bring Baka to jail.

In the film's climax, Baby is killed by Chamero and Baka goes to jail. Additionally, Tamang gets a promotion, and the two hackers become rich by getting all of Baka's money. The hackers phone Tamang and make fun of him. However, Tamang replies with the statement that "the dangerous game is about to begin", hinting at the possibility of a sequel.

== Filming ==
The film stars Arpan Thapa, Dayahang Rai, and Saugat Malla and was shot in Nepal, Belgium, and other parts of Europe.

== Cast ==
- Saugat Malla as Bankaa Don
- Dayahang Rai as Inspector Tank Bdr Tamang
- Arpan Thapa as Chamero
- Barsha Siwakoti as Baby
- Devu Shrestha as Deven Yuvraj
- Prakash Jung Shah as Guddu
- Sid Kharel as Rihan
- Nischal Basnet with a cameo appearance in the song Poko Parera
- Raju Lama as Raju
- Kesh Bahadur Shahi as Central Investigation Bureau (CIB) chief

== Songs ==
All tracks are written by Sabin Rai, Nischal Basnet and Deepak Raj.

No.	Title	Singer(s)	Length
1.	"Poko Parera"	Nischal Basnet	4:08
2.	"Run On Gun"	Sabin Rai	4:29
3.	"Maya Badyo Jhan Jhan"	Deepak Raj	4:15
Total length:			10:62
