= Boksi Ko Ghar =

- Theatrical release poster
- Nepali: बोक्सीको घर
- Directed by: Sulakshyan Bharati
- Written by: Sulakshyan Bharati
- Based on: Boksi Ko Ghar (play)
- Produced by: Badri Adhikari
- Starring: Keki Adhikari; Shupala Sapkota; Swechchha Raut
- Cinematography: Shivaram Shrestha
- Edited by: Sulakshyan Bharati; Lokesh Bajracharya
- Music by: Monish Niroula
- Production company: Keki Adhikari Films
- Distributed by: The Tea Folks Films
- Release date: April 26, 2024
- Country: Nepal
- Budget: est.रू1 crore
- Box office: est.रू10.10 crore

Boksi Ko Ghar (Nepali: बोक्सीको घर, transl. A Witch's House) is a 2024 Nepali psychological social-thriller film written and directed by Sulakshyan Bharati. It is based on a play written by Bharati himself, that focuses on issue of violence against women based on superstitious systems of witchcraft prevailed in Nepali society. The film is produced by Badri Adhikari under the banner of Keki Adhikari Films. The film features Keki Adhikari in the lead role with Shupala Sapkota, Swechchha Raut in supporting roles. It tells a painful story of a woman who is labelled as “witch” by her community.

The film released on April 26, 2024, with positive reviews from the critics and audiences alike. It was a superhit venture at the Nepal box office.

== Synopsis ==
A social drama set in a rural Nepali village that tackles that the pervasive issues of gender violence, institutionalized patriarchy, and the enduring social stigma of being labeled a 'Boksi' (witch). The film's narrative spans generations, beginning with the tragic life of a girl named Juni. At the age of eight, Juni is taken from school and forced into a marriage with a sex-hungry adult three times her age. She becomes a young widow after her husband's death and is then raped by her father-in-law. To conceal the crime, her mother-in-law calls upon a shaman to declare Juni a 'Boksi', leading to her being cast out and forced to live under a Pipal tree.

The main plot is framed by the arrival of a young, urban woman researcher, who visits the village to study the phenomenon of 'Boksi'. As the researcher attempts to unravel the dark truths behind the label, she is met with fear and resistance from the village's feudal structure, which tries to force her to leave highlighting institutionalized violence often reinforced by women themselves within the patriarchal system.

The climax sees the villagers' violence escalating, resulting in Juni being pelted to death, while the researcher is simultaneously whisked away and stigmatized to replace Juni under the Pipal tree, symbolizing the cyclical and enduring nature of the trauma and violence faced by women. The film serves as a powerful depiction of a woman's plight under patriarchy, combining past and present realities.

== Cast ==
- Keki Adhikari as Juni
  - Shupala Sapkota as young Juni
- Swechchha Raut
- Sulakshyan Bharati
- Rama Thapaliya
- Sushma Niraula
- Jiwan Baral
- Sabin Bastola

== Soundtrack ==
The music and background score of the film is composed by Monish Niroula. The first single of the film "Bujhina Maile" was released on 2 April 2024 and immediately became a hit on YouTube, creating a massive hype for the film. Its music is composed by Prakash Saput while Samikshya Adhikari sang the song. Second song titled "Jindagi" was released on May 1.

No.	Title	Lyrics	Singer	Length
1.	"Bujhina Maile"	Prakash Saput	Samikshya Adhikari	4:00
2.	"Jindagi"	Sulakshyan Bharati	Sweeariti, Neharika	3:44
Total length:				7:44

== Box office ==
The film had a good opening weekend in Nepal with a gross of रू2.30 crore, much better than initial expectations, taking its first four days collection total to रू3.24 crore and making it a commercial success. The film earned रू6.05 crore in its first week. It amassed रू7.55 crore after 9 days becoming the highest-grossing film featuring women lead in Nepal. In three weeks, it came to be the second film of 2024 after Mahajatra to cross रू10 crore in Nepal and 10th overall, becoming a blockbuster. The film enjoyed 51 days run in few theaters collecting around रू10.10 crore and becoming one of the highest-grossing films in Nepal.
