= Kabaddi Kabaddi Kabaddi =

2019 Nepali romantic comedy film

- Theatrical release poster
- Nepali: कबड्डी कबड्डी कबड्डी
- Directed by: Ram Babu Gurung
- Written by: Ram Babu Gurung; Upendra Subba
- Produced by: Mani Ram Pokharel; Arjun Karki; Om Chand Rauniyar
- Starring: Dayahang Rai; Upasana Singh Thakuri; Karma; Wilson Bikram Rai; Bijay Baral; Buddhi Tamang; Rishma Gurung
- Cinematography: Shailendra D. Karki
- Edited by: Nimesh Shrestha; Surendra Poudel
- Music by: Rohit Shakya
- Production company: Baasuri Films
- Release date: 20 September 2019
- Running time: 115 minutes
- Country: Nepal
- Language: Nepali
- Budget: रू2.5 crore
- Box office: रू7.60 crore

Kabaddi Kabaddi Kabaddi is a 2019 Nepalese romantic comedy-drama film, directed by Ram Babu Gurung, who co-wrote the screenplay with Upendra Subba. The film is produced by Mani Ram Pokharel, Arjun Karki, and Om Chand Rauniyar under the banners of Baasuri Films in association with Mountain Stories, and presented by Cinema Art. The film stars Dayahang Rai, Upasana Singh Thakuri, Rishma Gurung, Karma, Wilson Bikram Rai, Buddhi Tamang, and Bijaya Baral.

It was released on September 20, 2019, with mixed reviews from the critics and audience alike. Despite massive success of the previous films, its performance at the box office was an underwhelming affair. Sequel to 2015 film Kabaddi Kabaddi, it is the third installment of the Kabaddi franchise. It was followed by its sequel Kabaddi 4: The Final Match in 2022.

== Plot ==
Following the events of Kabaddi Kabaddi, where his long-time unrequited love, Maiya, eloped with her lover, Kaji initially becomes more arrogant and claims that love is no longer his priority, stating he will live with Maiya's memories.

However, Kaji soon develops feelings for Kasi, who is the daughter of his father's friend. Kasi, however, is in love with a man named Myaki. A complex love quadrangle forms as Kasi is also being pressured by her mother to marry the wealthy Dhan Kaji, while her father, Lal Bahadur favors Kaji due to his dislike for Dhan Kaji.

Kaji attempts to pursue Kasi, even befriending her father to compete with Dhan Kaji. He eventually confesses his love to Kasi, but she rejects him. Having matures somewhat from his previous heartbreak, Kaji decides not to obsess over the unrequited love and instead chooses to help Kasi and her lover, Myaki, in their pursuit of being together.

== Cast ==
- Dayahang Rai as Kaji
- Upasana Singh Thakuri as Kasi
- Karma as Myaki
- Wilson Bikram Rai as Dhan Kaji
- Buddhi Tamang as Chhantyal
- Bijay Baral as B.K.
- Rishma Gurung as Maiya (special appearance)
- Puskar Gurung as Mukhiya
- Kabita Ale as Mukhini
- Maotse Gurung as Lal Bahadur, Kasi's father
- Loonibha Tuladhar as Guni Maya, Kasi's mother
- Kamal Mani Nepal as Jhamak Bahadur
- Aruna Karki as Juna
- Daktar Singh Gurung as Ashok Sherchan
- Shila Khanal as Ashok's wife
- Mani K. Rai as Bidhan Sherchan

== Soundtrack ==
Original Motion Picture Soundtrack
No.	Title	Lyrics	Music	Singer(s)	Length
1.	"Dubo Phulyo"	Hark Saud	SD Yogi	Hemanta Rana, Hritika Shrestha	4:11
2.	"Maya Pirati"	Kali Prasad Baskota, Sabin Ektaare	Kali Prasad Baskota	Kali Prasad Baskota	2:58
3.	"Kabaddi Kabaddi Kabaddi"	Kali Prasad Baskota, Anupam Sharma	Sunny Sunam	Kali Prasad Baskota, Anupam Sharma	3:25
Total length:					10:34

== Box office ==
Due to the enormous hype of return of the franchise, the film opened with record-breaking highest opening day for a Nepali film in Nepal with रू1.47 crore gross. Despite initial success, it slightly underperformed at the box office, ending its domestic run at रू7.60 crore.

== Reception ==
Diwakar Pyakurel of Online Khabar praised the lead actors' performance, writing: "Not only popular Daya Hang Rai, but emerging Thakuri and Baral have given an impressive performance in the project."

Sunny Mahat of The Annapurna Express said that the film is "an all-out entertainer and also offers a great lesson to Nepali filmmakers—you don't need to bar foreign films in order for the Nepali films to be successful. Just make good cinema." He rated the film 3 out of 5 stars, and described it as "a complete family entertainer".

Rupak Risal, writing for Moviemandu, said that the "viewers will have a gleeful time at the theater".

Kabaddi Kabaddi Kabaddi was listed in eighth place on a "Best Nepali Movies of 2019 You Need to Watch" list by Nepali Sansar.

Abhimanyu Dixit of The Kathmandu Post said: "Kabaddi 3 is redundant. There's nothing we haven't seen before."
