= How Funny =

How Funny!!
- How Funny!! film poster
- Nepali: हाऊ फन्नी
- Directed by: Nilu Doma Sherpa
- Screenplay by: Shan Basnyat
- Story by: Nilu Doma Sherpa
- Produced by: Malvika Subba
- Starring: Priyanka Karki; Keki Adhikari; Dayahang Rai; Bijay Baral; Nisha Adhikari; Shishir Rana; Anoop Bikram Shahi
- Cinematography: Shiva Ram Shrestha
- Edited by: Nimesh Shrestha
- Music by: Songs: Basanta Sapkota; Background Scores: Shailesh Shrestha
- Production companies: Eyecore Films Nepal; A Tiny But Big Pictures
- Release date: 22 April 2016 (Nepal)
- Running time: 138 minutes
- Country: Nepal
- Language: Nepali

How Funny!! (Nepali: हाऊ फन्नी!!) is a 2016 Nepali comedy film, directed by Nilu Doma Sherpa as her feature film debut. Produced by Malvika Subba for Eyecore Films Nepal and A Tiny But Big Pictures, the film stars Dayahang Rai, Priyanka Karki, Keki Adhikari, Anoop Bikram Shahi and Nisha Adhikari. After the film's first week of screening in the Kathmandu valley, it was reported to have netted Nrs 30 lakh during that debut week.

== Plot ==
When Heera (Nisha Adhikari) goes missing and Police Inspector Rai (Dayahang Rai) is having difficulties in discovering her whereabouts. he then hires village girls Pushpa (Priyanka Karki) and Ramita (Keki Adhikari) in hopes he might solve the case with their assistance. The two girls are initially happy with the offer, but have plans of their own.

== Cast ==
- Priyanka Karki as Ramita
- Keki Adhikari as Pushpa
- Dayahang Rai as Inspector Tej Bahadur Rai
- Bijay Baral
- Nisha Adhikari as Heera Samragyee
- Anoop Bikram Shahi
- Sandip Chettri (Special Appearance)

== Soundtrack ==
No.	Title	Singer(s)	Length
1.	"Yo Ke Ho Maya Jastai"	Milan Amatya, Deepa Limbu	4:59
2.	"How Funny"	Deepa Lama, Rita K C	2:45
3.	"Disco Dance"	Subani Moktan, Indira Joshi	4:12
4.	"Siraima Sirbandi"	Melina Rai	4:17

== Production ==
In September 2014, Tiny But Big Pictures announced their intention to create the film as Nilu Doma Sherpa's first feature film, and filming subsequently took place during December 2014 in Kupondole.

== Reception ==
Online Khabar praised the film and related that director Sherpa made a "remarkable but messy debut". In a video review, Canada Nepal also praised the film.
