= Kabaddi Kabaddi (2015 film) =

2015 Nepali film directed by Ram Babu Gurung

- Promotional release poster
- कबड्‍डी कबड्‍डी
- Directed by: Ram Babu Gurung
- Written by: Ram Babu Gurung; Upendra Subba
- Produced by: Raunak Bikram Kandel; Sunil Chand Rauniyar
- Starring: Dayahang Rai; Saugat Malla; Rishma Gurung; Bijay Baral; Buddhi Tamang
- Cinematography: Shailendra D. Karki
- Edited by: Nimesh Shrestha
- Music by: Rohit Shakya
- Production company: Cinema Art
- Distributed by: Popcorn Pictures
- Release date: 27 November 2015
- Running time: 133 minutes
- Country: Nepal
- Language: Nepali
- Budget: est.रू1 crore
- Box office: est.रू10.35 crore

Kabaddi Kabaddi (Nepali: कबड्‍डी कबड्‍डी) is a 2015 Nepalese romantic comedy-drama film directed by Ram Babu Gurung, who co-wrote the screenplay with Upendra Subba. The film stars Dayahang Rai, Saugat Malla, Rishma Gurung, Bijay Baral, Buddhi Tamang and Shishir Bangdel. Produced by Raunak Bikram Kandel and Sunil Chand Rauniyar under the banner of Cinema Art, it is the second installment of the Kabaddi franchise, a sequel to the 2014 film Kabaddi.

The film released on November 27, 2015 among generally positive reaction from audience and performed well at the box office. It managed to continue the legacy of the franchise with the original story and light humor. It has a cult following in Nepal as well as among the Nepalese diaspora all over the world. It was one of the highest-grossing films in Nepal at the time of its release. Its sequel Kabaddi Kabaddi Kabaddi released in 2019. The final sequel, Kabaddi 4: The Final Match, was released in 2022.

== Plot ==
One year after the events of Kabaddi, the story resumes in Naurikot village of Mustang.

Kaji’s friends, B.K and Chhantyal, are worried that Maiya would force Kaji to perpetual celibacy. But Kaji remains stubbornly optimistic that his unwavering love will eventually attract her, “just like money attracts money.” Kaji gets B.K to write a love letter using chicken blood for ink.

The political fervor of upcoming parliamentary elections grips the single-constituency district. Kaji has risen to become an influential young leader in village politics and chairman of youth association of the Laligurans Party. He stakes his reputation on helping his uncle, Lal Kaji Sherchan, win the election. However, the opposing Saptarangi Party fields Maiya’s father, Ambir Gauchan, as its candidate setting the stage for dramatic conflict of interest. Amidst the chaos, Chhantyal is desperate for a child and seeks the help of a local shaman, Jhakri. Lal Kaji’s son, Bam Kaji, a city-educated young man also arrives in the village.

Ambir Gauchan returns to the village for his campaign and, recognizing Kaji’s obsession, manipulates Kaji through Maiya to secure his support. Kaji defects his old party and changes alliance. Bam Kaji, learning of Kaji’s years-long, relentless pursuit of Maiya, decides to pursue her with greater effort. Maiya, initially flattered by the attention of the suave, educated city boy, begins to acknowledge his advances. Kaji, now Ambir’s tactical advisor, helps his new alliance build a strong foundation for victory. The simmering tension boils over when Lal Kaji confronts Kaji about his deception. A vicious fight erupts between the cousins, solidifying their rivalry and leaving Kaji with an injury to his hand.

Later, at a local liquor shop, a drunken Bam Kaji exposes his cynical intentions: he doesn’t truly love Maiya. He intends to marry her on a bet with his roommate, Bibek, simply to prove he can marry a village girl before his ex-girlfriend, Lolita, marries. When this information reaches Maiya through Chhantyal’s distraught wife, Maiya is temporarily appalled, brushing off Bam Kaji and, for the first time, showing a measure of respect for Kaji’s genuine feelings. But Bam Kaji, a master of emotional manipulation, swiftly regains her attention with relentless pursuits. Tragedy strikes Chhantyal when his wife, Gauri, reveals she is pregnant, but the father is the shaman. Chhantyal attacks the fleeing shaman, but the emotional damage is irreparable. Election is completed and Saptarangi party is declared the winner. Chhantyal decides to leave the village with the financial help from Kaji. As he departs, he spots Bam Kaji and Maiya eloping and immediately alerts Kaji.

In the climax, Kaji and his team pursue Bam Kaji and Maiya in a thrilling bike chase and eventually manage to stop them. Fight ensues between the cousins for one last time. In a heartbreaking scene, Maiya condemns Kaji’s actions again and delivers the final blow: she would rather die than be his wife. Devastated and speechless by her words, Kaji finally retreats. His years-long obsession ends as he tears apart the love letter into pieces.

Few days later in Kathmandu, Bam Kaji and Maiya visit a temple for their wedding, only for Bam Kaji to discover his cynicism has backfired: his roommate Bibek and his ex-girlfriend Lolita are there getting married themselves. Back in Naurikot, a weary B.K suggests Kaji they both leave the village, as everyone they cared about has gone. Kaji denies as he vows to remain in the village, focus on serving his people through politics and never marry. In the meantime, Kaji’s other cousin, Dilkumari, arrives to congratulate him for winning the election. B.K implies that she is far better prospect than Maiya, suggesting the cycle of attraction and complication may yet continue.

== Cast ==
- Dayahang Rai as Kaji
- Saugat Malla as Bam Kaji
- Rishma Gurung as Maiya
- Bijay Baral as B.K.
- Buddhi Tamang as Chhantyal
- Maotse Gurung as Lal Kaji, Bam's father
- Upendra Subba as Jhakri
- Sishir Bangdel as Ambir Gauchan, Maiya's father
- Pushkar Gurung as Mukhiya, Kaji's father
- Kabita Ale as Kaji's mother
- Birmaya Gurung as Bam's mother
- Aruna Karki as Juna, Maiya's Mother
- Pashupati Rai as Gauri, Chhantyal's wife
- Junu Bista as Nirjala
- Mani Ram Pokhrel as Lalit Prasad
- Kamal Mani Nepal as B.K's father
- Nischal Basnet as Bibek (cameo)
- Priyanka Karki as Lolita (cameo)
- Srijana Subba as Dilkumari (special appearance)

== Soundtrack ==
The music for the film is composed by Kali Prasad Baskota and Anupam Sharma while Rohit Shakya provided the background score.

No.	Title	Lyrics	Music	Singer(s)	Length
1.	"Maya Ka Baadal"	Aayush Niraula, Anupam Sharma	Anupam Sharma	Anupam Sharma	4:50
2.	"Lappan Chappan"	Kali Prasad Baskota	Kali Prasad Baskota	Kali Prasad Baskota	3:28
3.	"Hit Geet"	Kali Prasad Baskota	Kali Prasad Baskota	Nischal Basnet	3:30
Total length:					11:48

== Box office ==
The film grossed रू10.35 crore at the domestic box office and became the second highest grossing Nepali film in Nepal at the time of its release, behind Kohinoor.
