= Ghampani =

- घामपानी
- Directed by: Dipendra Lama
- Written by: Dipendra Lama
- Produced by: Om Gurung, Om Chand Rauniyar, Arjun Karki, Shailendra D Karki and Bishow Gauchan
- Starring: Dayahang Rai; Keki Adhikari; Ankeet Khadka; Prakash Ghimire; Pushkar Gurung
- Cinematography: Shailendra D Karki
- Edited by: Nimesh Shrestha
- Music by: Songs: Kali Prasad Baskota; Chandra Kumar Dong; Background Scores: Shailesh Shrestha; Rohit Shakya
- Production companies: Cinema Arts, Highlights Nepal, Torch Light Productions and Aslesha Entertainment
- Distributed by: Kafia Films (Kathmandu valley), Shree Byankatesh Entertainment (Out of Kathmandu valley)
- Release date: 14 April 2017 (Nepal)
- Running time: 1h 50m
- Country: Nepal
- Language: Nepali
- Budget: 10 million Rupees
- Box office: 25 million Rupees

Ghampani (Nepali: घामपानी, lit. 'Sunshower') is a 2017 Nepali language drama film written and directed by film critic Dipendra Lama. It stars Dayahang Rai and Keki Adhikari in leading roles. The film has two songs composed by Kali Prasad Baskota and Chandra Kumar Dong. Ghampani recorded as a hit at the box office, collecting 12 million rupees in the first three days after its release.

== Plot ==
Two childhood friends Furba Tamang (Dayahang) and Tara Sharma (Keki) have affection for each other. Furba stays in village as a teacher, while Tara goes to Kathmandu to get higher education. During Tara's annual vacation to village, they flourish their intimate relationship further more. Tara's father Pitambar and Furba's father Maila are very good friends and neighbors. Pitambar, former president of the village development committee gradually discovers his daughter's affair with Furba. Then he decides to tie his daughter's knot with Kamal Adhikari, a police assistant sub-inspector. In return, Tara and Furba choose a path of revolt. They draw a plan to make their love a success and to treat Kamal with a sweet revenge.

== Cast ==
- Dayahang Rai as Furba Tamang
- Keki Adhikari as Tara Sharma
- Ankeet Khadka
- Silsa Jirel
- Prakash Ghimire as Tara's Father
- Pushkar Gurung
- Buddhi Tamang
- Kabita Ale
- Aruna Karki
- Amogh Pokharel
- Keshav Rai
- Saroj Aryal
- Prem Barsha Khadka
- Ganesh Munal
- Laxmi Bardewa
- Mani Ram Pokharel
- Ujjawal Sharma Bhandari
- Samrant Thapa

== Soundtrack ==
No.	Title	Music	Singer(s)	Length
1.	"Panchhi"	Kali Prasad Baskota	Kali Prasad Baskota	3:47
2.	"Apa Lai Mero"	Chandra Kumar Dong	Sanjeeb Waiba, Ful Kumar Bamjan, Jitu Lopchan	4:27
Total length:				7:74

- 'Panchhi' is a modern song composed by popular musician Kali Prasad Baskota, describes about the freedom of two lovers.
- 'Apa lai Mero' is a Tamang Traditional Song sung by Sanjeev Waiba, Phul Kumar Bamjan and Jitu Lopchan. It explains the value of cultural harmony.

== Awards ==
Ghampani was nominated for the Best debut director (Dipendra Lama), Best script (Dipendra Lama) and Best supporting actor (Ankeet Khadka) in the 5th INAS (International Nepalese Artist Society) film award held in Kathmandu on 13 October 2017. It won Best script award and Best film jury award.
