= List of most expensive Nepali films =

List of the most expensive Nepali films

This is a list of the most expensive Nepali Films, with budgets given in Nepali rupees and US dollars.

== Most expensive Nepali films ==
Rank	Film		Year	Production Company	Budget (est.)	Notes	Ref.
Rank	Name	Director	Year	Production Company	Budget (est.)	Notes	Ref.
1	Shambhala	Min Bahadur Bham	2024	Shooney Films	रू15 crore (US$1.1 million)		
2	Nalapani	Rimesh Adhikari	2022	Rimesh Adhikari Film	रू8.0 crore (US$590,000)		
3	Hrawsho Deergha	Chandra Panta	2024	Neeta Films	रू6.0 crore (US$440,000)		
4	Pitambar	Krisha Chaulagain	2025	KP Films & Purushottam Pradhan Films	रू5.0 crore (US$370,000)		
5	12 Gaun	Biraj Bhatta	2024	Biraj Bhatt Film Production	रू4.0 crore (US$300,000)		
5	Prem Geet 3	Santosh Sen Chhetan Gurung	2022	Aasusen Films Production	रू4.0 crore (US$300,000)		
5	Dimag Kharab	Nischal Basnet	2023	Cinema Art Pvt. Ltd. Black Horse Pictures Pvt.Ltd.	रू4.0 crore (US$300,000)		
5	Farki Farki	Suyog Gurung	2024	Rohit Adhikari Films	रू4.0 crore (US$300,000)		
6	Mahajatra	Pradip Bhattarai	2024	Shatkon Arts	रू3.5 crore (US$260,000)		
7	Pashupati Prasad 2: Bhasme Don	Dipendra K Khanal	2023	Tukee Arts	रू3.0 crore (US$220,000)		
7	Kabaddi 4: The Final Match	Ram Babu Gurung	2022	Baasuri Films	रू3.0 crore (US$220,000)		
7	Chhakka Panja 4	Hem Raj BC	2023	Aama Saraswati Movies	रू3.0 crore (US$220,000)		
7	Chhakka Panja 5	Deepa Shree Niraula	2024	Aama Saraswati Movies	रू3.0 crore (US$220,000)		
8	Senti Virus	Ram Babu Gurung	2020	Subihani Films	रू2.8 crore (US$210,000)		

== See also ==
- List of highest-grossing Nepali films in overseas markets.
