= Keki Adhikari =

Nepalese actress and a professional model

Keki Adhikari केकी अधिकारी
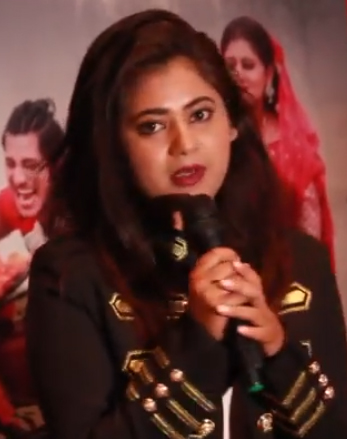
- Keki Adhikari at promotional event of Rajja Rani in 2018
- Born: 17 December 1989 (age 36); Jorpati, Kathmandu, Nepal
- Education: Bal Sirjanalaya School; White House College (+2); Prime College (BIM); Presidential Business School (MBA)
- Occupation: Actress
- Height: 1.52 m (5 ft 0 in)
- Spouse: Rohit Tiwari - Indian nationality (2022-present)
- Awards: 7th NEFTA Award; 1st CG Kamana Award; D Cine Award (2014)

Keki Adhikari (Nepali: केकी अधिकारी; pronounced [kekiː ʌd̪ʱikaːri]; born 17 December 1989) is a Nepalese actress. A prolific screen actor, she has featured in a wide range of films and television series across multiple genres. One of the highest-paid actress in Nepal and has received numerous accolades, including three Kamana Film Awards.

She has appeared in music videos, television commercials, print ads and Nepali movies. She started off her career featuring in music videos before she made her acting debut with Swor opposite Raj Ballav Koirala. She subsequently earned wide recognition for her performances in I Am Sorry, Masan, Mayako Barima, Mahasus, Biteka Pal and Mero Best Friend. She recently made her debut in theater with historical play Chaarumati.

== Personal life ==
Adhikari married her boyfriend, Rohit Tiwari, on 21 April 2022.

=== Education ===
Keki Adhikari has graduated with an MBA degree in human resources management from Presidential Business School in Thapagau, Baneshwor, Kathmandu, in 2016. She had done her bachelor's degree in business in 2013 from Tribhuvan University. She did her Bachelor in Information Management (BIM) from Prime College.

== Filmography ==
Key

Key
†	Denotes films that have not yet been released

Films
Year	Film	Role	Notes	Ref(s)
2010	Swor		Opposite RajBallav Koirala	
2011	Masan	Helen	Based on a play by Gopal Prasad Rimal	
2012	I Am Sorry	Shruti	Opposite Aryan Sigdel	
2013	Mahasus		Opposite Aryan Sigdel	
2014	Biteka Pal	Nima/Numa	Director Suraj Subba Nalbo	
2014	Mero Best Friend		Special appearance	
2014	Biteka Pal			
2014	Shree paach Ambare		Opposite Saugat Malla	
2014	Mutu-the heart belongs to you		Opposite Bimlesh Adhikari	
2015	Fanko	Mithu		
2015	Bagmati			
2015	Punarjanma			
2016	Bhaag Saani Bhaag	Saani		
2016	How Funny	Puspa		
2016	Savitri	Savitri	Short film based on Bhawani bhikshu's Typist	
2017	Ghampani			
2017	Lalteen			
2017	Aishwarya			
2017	Love Sasha	Sasha	Opposite Karma Love Story Romance Genre	
2018	Rajja Rani	Raani	Opposite to Nazir Hussain	
2018	Gaunki Chhori			
2018	Nai Nabhannu La 5			
2018	Kohalpur Express		Also a producer.	
2019	Chha Maya Chhapakkai	Jaal	Opposite Dipak Raj Giri	
2022	Jhingedaau	Sita		
2024	Boksi Ko Ghar			
2025	Paran			
2026	Kaji			

== Awards ==
List of awards
Year	Ceremony	Category	Work	Result
2016	8th Dcine Awards 2016	Critics Award		Won
2016	NFDC Award 2016	Best actress	Bhag Sani Bhag	Nominated
2016	LG Film Awards	Best actress	Bhag Sani Bhag	Nominated
