= Chhadke =

- Movie poster
- Nepali: छड्के
- Directed by: Nigam Shrestha
- Written by: Nigam Shrestha
- Starring: Bipin Karki; Saugat Malla; Dayahang Rai; Namrata Shrestha; Arpan Thapa; Robin Tamang
- Cinematography: Sanjay Lama
- Edited by: Dirgha Khadka
- Distributed by: Music Nepal
- Release date: 22 February 2013 (Nepal)
- Running time: 2h 5m
- Country: Nepal
- Language: Nepali

Chhadke is a Nepalese film which tells the story about two best friends. The trio all had dreams to fulfill 'when they grew up', but time and destiny seem to have other plans for them

== Plot ==
This movie is about two politicians who want to be crowned as prime minister but they use gangs to kill each other so they can win.

== Cast ==
- Nikun Shrestha as Prakash's Friend
- Bipin Karki as Bindu
- Kameshwor Chaurasiya as Jogi
- Saugat Malla as Researcher
- Dayahang Rai as Dawa
- Namrata Shrestha as Soli
- Prateek Raj Neupane as Taate
- Arpan Thapa as Boksi
- Aruna Karki as Tattoo's Wife
- Robin Tamang as Chewang
- [ Cinematographer] Sanjay Lama
- [ Editor] Dirgha Khadka
