= Taandro =

- Directed by: Samten Bhutia
- Written by: Upendra Subba
- Produced by: Satish Kumar Gautam
- Starring: Dayahang Rai; Maniram Pokharel; Ram Babu Gurung
- Cinematography: Purushottam Pradhan
- Edited by: Monaranjan Shrestha; Akki Sharma(VFX)
- Music by: Aadha Sur
- Distributed by: Mountain River Films
- Release date: 18 January 2016 (International); 2017/11/10 - Nepal
- Running time: 112 minutes
- Country: Nepal
- Language: Nepali

Taandro (Nepali: तान्द्रो; English: Deciphering Me) is a 2016 Nepali language film directed by Samten Bhutia and produced by Satish Kumar Gautam. The film is based on the book Smriti Ka Dobharu written by Ganga Bahadur Lama. The story of the film is based on the confrontation between the Government of Nepal and the Maoists followed by the civil rights movement which came to an end after the overthrow of the Nepalese Monarchy and establishment of a People's Republic. This film was selected for the 19th International Film Festival in Dhaka.

== Synopsis ==
Koshish is a member of an underground Maoist group that is battling the Government of Nepal to overthrow the monarchy and establish a republic. He belongs to the cultural wing of the outfit, which consists of troops that go from village to village and spread awareness among the poor, uneducated masses about their rights. It is in effect the propaganda wing of the guerrilla outfit. Koshish is leading an unarmed cultural troop on an awareness program in the village of Chailung, in the western district of Lamjung. Right after they finish the program, which consists of skits, songs and dances that glorify their movement, they are ambushed by the then Royal Nepalese Army. In the ensuing melee, most of the troop escape, but one of Koshish's comrades and an innocent village girl are killed and he himself is shot in his left leg. He manages to escape to a nearby field where he hides out from the army. The next few days are a fight for survival for Koshish. He has to deal with the physical pain of his horrific wound, and the painful memories of the past. On top of that, the villagers discover him and are upset because they think he is also to blame for the death of one of their own people. It is going to take unexpected kindness on the part of strangers, loyalty of his comrades and sheer will power of Koshish to come out of this dire situation alive.

== Cast ==
- Dayahang Rai
- Maniram Pokharel
- Ram Babu Gurung
- Buddhi Tamang
