= Rishma Gurung =

Nepalese actress and model

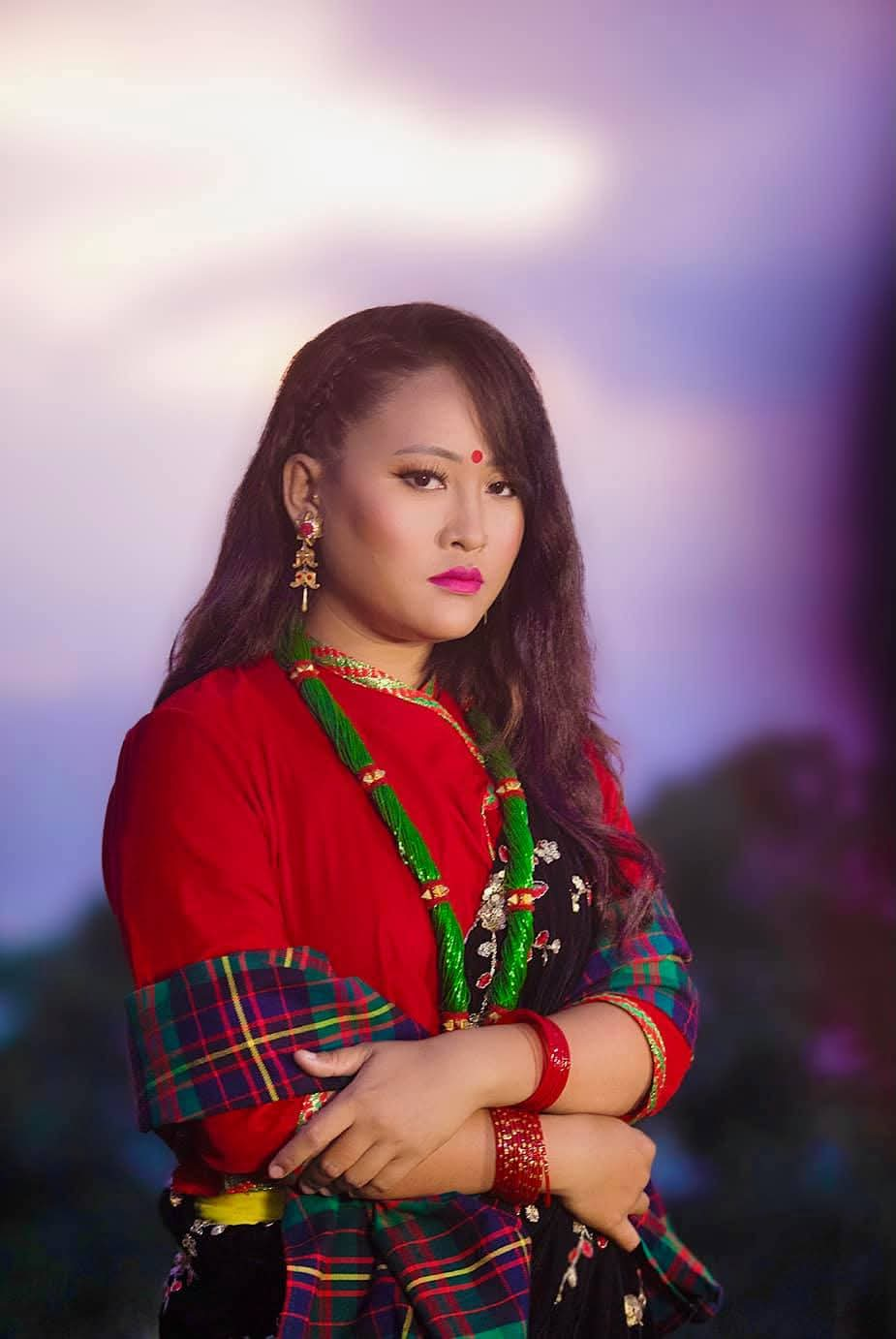
- 29 Aug 2021
- Born: 6 June 1994 (age 32); Pokhara, Nepal
- Occupations: Actress, model
- Years active: 2013–present

Rishma Gurung (Nepali: रिस्मा गुरुङ) is a Nepalese actress and model who debuted in the film Kabaddi in 2013. She acted in the Kabaddi sequel movie Kabaddi Kabaddi in 2015.

== Early life and education ==
Rishma Gurung was born on 6 June 1994 in Pokhara, Nepal. Raised in the lakeside city, she discovered a passion for performing arts during her childhood and spent her early years learning traditional dance, later teaching dance choreography to youth in her village.

Gurung completed her early education in Pokhara before focusing on her higher academic pursuits. She graduated with a Bachelor's degree in Business Studies (BBS) from Tribhuvan University, making her the first woman in her family to achieve a university-level education.She subsequently moved to Kathmandu to continue her education, enrolling in a Master of Business Administration (MBA) program while simultaneously managing her emerging career in the entertainment industry. Prior to her mainstream silver-screen debut in the critically acclaimed film Kabaddi (2014), she built her initial acting foundations by appearing in local Gurung-language cultural films.

== Filmography ==
Key
†	Denotes films that have not yet been released

Year	Film	Role	Notes
	Karma		Gurung Film
	Sairbe Mhi		Gurung Film
2014	Kabbadi	Maiya	Debut film
2015	Kabaddi Kabaddi	Maiya	
2016	Jhumkee	Dewaki	
2019	Kabaddi Kabaddi Kabaddi	Maiya	Cameo
2025	Reemai		

== Awards ==
SN	Award Title	Film Name	Year	Result / Reference
1	Best Debut Actress (NEFTA Film Awards)	Kabaddi	2015	Nominated
2	Best Actress (International Nepali Film Award - INFA)	Rimai	2026	Nominated
