= Dasdhunga =

Dasdhunga (Nepali: दासढुङ्गा) is a Nepali film based on true events of the mysterious death of leader of CPN-UML Madan Bhandari in Dashdhunga, Trishuli, Nepal. The only witness of the event and the driver of the vehicle was later shot dead at Kirtipur. A dynamic leader, his case remains unsolved to this day due to a lack of evidence. Produced by Apil Bista
