= Jaari (film) =

2023 Nepalese film written & directed by Upendra Subba

- Theatrical release poster
- Nepali: जारी
- Directed by: Upendra Subba
- Written by: Upendra Subba
- Story by: Suresh Niyong Limbu
- Produced by: Ram Babu Gurung
- Starring: Dayahang Rai; Miruna Magar; Bijay Baral
- Cinematography: Shailendra D Karki
- Edited by: Nimesh Shrestha
- Music by: Ganga Thapa
- Production company: Baasuri FIlms
- Distributed by: Tea Folks FIlms; Byankatesh Entertainment
- Release date: 14 April 2023
- Running time: 121 minutes
- Country: Nepal
- Language: Nepali
- Budget: est.रू2 crore
- Box office: est.रू17.48 crore

Jaari (Nepali: जारी) is a 2023 Nepali social drama film written and directed by Upendra Subba, marking his directorial debut. The film is produced by Ram Babu Gurung under the banner of Baasuri Films. The film stars Dayahang Rai, Miruna Lisara Magar, Prem Subba, Bijay Baral, Roydeep Shrestha, Anil Subba, and Rekha Limbu. The film is based on Limbu community and their Jaari tradition, which was historically one of the most significant part of their culture; the Jaari tradition was also relevant in many other communities of Nepal. The story continues in the sequel Jaari 2.

Released on 14 April 2023 in cinemas worldwide, the film received critical acclaim, with praise directed towards debutant director Subba's work, the story and overall presentation. It was lauded as a mirror of Limbu culture, showcasing traditional elements like Palam dance and Chyabrung music. The film was a record breaking blockbuster at the box office and enjoyed more than 100 days run in the theatres all over Nepal. At the end of its run, it became one of the highest-grossing films in Nepal of all time.

== Plot ==
Set against the scenic backdrop of the Limbu community in rural Eastern Nepal, circa 1995, Jaari delves into the cultural tradition of the same name: a compensation custom paid to a former husband upon his wife's remarriage.

Namsang and Hangma are a Limbu couple, who have been into five years of volatile, childless marriage. Namsang is depicted as an angry patriarchal man whose bitterness over their infertility drives him to verbally and physically abuse Hangma, often threatening to take a second wife to produce an heir. Following a violent argument, Hangma returns the Yuparung (a sacred coin) to Namsang, thus severing their traditional bond and returning to her parents' home. Namsang's stubborn pride prevents him from seeking reconciliation or bringing her home.

While staying with her family, Hangma attends a local cultural fair. She participates in the traditional Palam dance, a Limbu folk song and dance form, where she meets Serang, a charming young man. Serang manages to win her attention during the Palam competition, and the two quickly fall in love. In an act of self-determination and seeking happiness, Hangma elopes with Serang, legally solidifying her second marriage.

This second union triggers the social custom of Jaari. Namsang and his family, leveraging the cultural mandate, demand substantial monetary compensation from Hangma's parents. Unable to afford the hefty sum, Hangma makes the agonizing decision to return to Namsang's house not as his wife, but as a servant committing to work off the debt herself. Namsang, still filled with ego and anger, enlists help from Mangal Singh to find a girl for second marriage, but to no avail due to his infamy.

Confined to a small shed and subjected to relentless physical labor, Hangma endures servitude under the watchful, yet increasingly conflicted eyes of her former in-laws and Namsang. Bardhoj, crestfallen by his sister's plight, decides to pay the debt himself by manufacturing and selling the Chyabrung as many and as quickly as possible. The emotional core of the film hinges on Namsang's slow-burn internal transformation after his mother's demise. As he witnesses the brutal cost of his pride reflected in Hangma's suffering, his anger begins to dissolve into guilt and sympathy. The sight of her profound sacrifice and misery gradually begins to erode his toxic masculinity. Subtle acts of compassion between them hint a deep and unspoken reconciliation growing between them beneath the weight of tradition.

Bardhoj arrives with the necessary funds to pay the Jaari, finally securing Hangma's freedom from servitude. However, by this point, Namsang has fundamentally changed. He publicly rejects the payment and, in a powerful reversal of his initial demands, steps forward to reclaim Hangma. The reconciliation is cemented when Hangma, still bound by obligations to Serang, challenges Namsang to a Palam contest to win her hand. Namsang performs the traditional song for the first time, using heartfelt verses learned from his late mother to express his remorse and devotion. Seeing the sincerity of his transformation and genuine love, Hangma deliberately loses the challenge, completing their tumultuous journey back to one another.

In the mid credits scene, It is announced that their story will continue in the sequel Jaari 2. Additionally, it is shown that Hangma has given birth to a baby girl, suggesting that their arduous journey has finally led to the fulfillment of the desire that initially fractured their lives.

== Cast ==
- Dayahang Rai as Namsang
- Miruna Magar as Hangma
- Bijay Baral as Mangal Singh
- Prem Subba as Subha Sher Bahadur, Namsang's father
- Roydeep Shrestha as Serang
- Rekha Limbu as Numa
- Anil Subba as Bardhoj, Hangma's brother
- Puskar Gurung as Subha Sundhante, Hangma's father
- Kamal Mani Nepal as BK
- Parikshya Limbu as Henjila, Hangma's sister

== Soundtrack ==
The music is composed by Kali Prasad Baskota and Manoj Thapa Magar, while the cultural music was contributed by Jhuma Limbu. First song, Chari Basyo was released on March 25, 2023. Second song, Reet was released on April 17, 2023. Palam song was released on June 3.

No.	Title	Lyrics	Music	Singer(s)	Length
1.	"Chari Basyo"	Kali Prasad Baskota	Kali Prasad Baskota	Kali Prasad Baskota	3:07
2.	"Reet"	Hark Saud	Manoj Thapa Magar	Manoj Thapa Magar, Sunita Thegim	6:12
3.	"Palam"	Govind Hukpa Chongbang	Jhuma Limbu	Tirsana	3:36
Total length:					9:19

== Box office ==
Jaari became a blockbuster at the box office. The film managed to complete 100 days run in theaters grossing रू17.18 crore to became second highest grosser of the year after Chhakka Panja 4, and one of the highest-grossing Nepali films of all time. The film minted रू17.48 crore at the end of its run.

== Reception ==
Jaari met with much critical acclaim, with praise directed towards Subba's work, including his writing, dialogues, authenticity, and direction. However, some critics believed the story could have been developed further, and some felt that the story was somewhat biased in favor of men.

Urza Acharya from The Kathmandu Post wrote: "Jaari could’ve been a lot of things. It could’ve and should’ve given Hangma more depth and autonomy. It should’ve challenged that status quo not only through an indigenous perspective but also via gender and non-patriarchal lens. But the story was surprisingly (and disappointingly) run-of-the-mill. That is Jaari’s one true weakness."

Renuka Dhakal from The Rising Nepal praised the overall storyline of the film and wrote: "Despite being his debut feature film, Upendra Subba has demonstrated a potential to shape the industry's future through this movie. It is often said that films are a mirror of society, and Jaari looks true to this saying. Subba, through this movie, has presented an honest and simplistic portrayal of the Limbu culture."

Bibek Timsina from The Annapurna Express criticized the characteristics of male characters from the films Subba have written, where he mentioned the character of Kaji from Kabaddi franchise and Namsang from this film "creates a feeling of déjà vu in some scenes", since both of them have very similar characteristics. But at the same time, he praised Subba for making the audience fall in love with such characters, he also praised Subba's debut as a director, he wrote: "Upendra Subba has managed to create a heartfelt movie with minimal missteps."
