= Kali Prasad Baskota =

Nepali singer

Kali Prasad Baskota कालीप्रसाद बास्कोटा
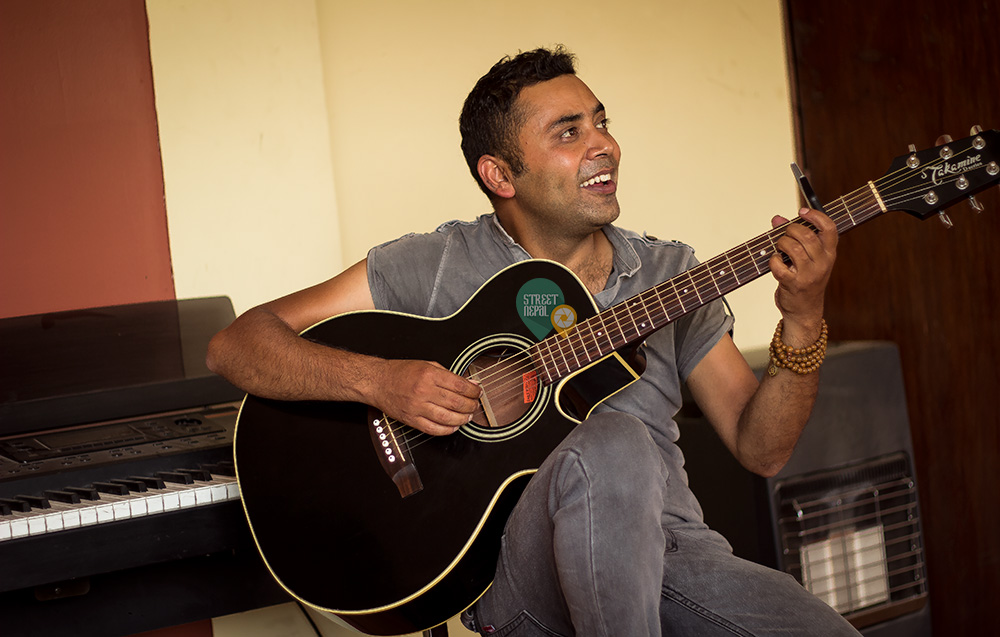
- Kali Prasad Baskota

Background information
- Born: 16 December 1979 (age 46); Nepal
- Genre: Pop Folk
- Occupations: Lyricist; Singer; Musician
- Instruments: Guitar; Keyboard
- Years active: 2008 – present
- Labels: THT Live; Kali Prasad Baskota
- Website: Official website

Kali Prasad Baskota (Nepali: काली प्रसाद बास्कोटा) is a Nepali singer, musician and lyricist. Baskota has also judged in Four season of Nepali Reality show Nepal Idol. Baskota has also judged a child reality show called "sa re ga ma pa lil champs Nepal".

== Career ==
He started his music career since 2007/8, as a lyricist and composer for the song Chahana Sakiyo Bahana Sakiyo sung by Sashi Rawal. Some of his earlier hits are Laija Re sung by Hemant Rana, Bida nai deu baru sung by Azad Dhungana. His 2017 song called Saili sung by Hemant Rana was trending worldwide on No. 14 on YouTube after the first week of its release. The song also made the record for getting more than 400,000 views in YouTube in first 24 hours of release, which was the most views any Nepali song got till that date. In feature films he gave songs like Jaalma, Nira, Lappan Chappan, Panchi, Daiba Hey. Kali did his singing debut from song Jaalma from the movie Resham filili which is of the biggest hit songs in Nepali movie industry.

In recent times, his song "Thamel Bazaar" from the movie Loot 2 (a sequel to the highly successful movie Loot and directed by Nischal Basnet) is one of the most viewed Nepali songs; it ranks third amongst the most viewed Nepali songs on YouTube. Some of his most recent songs are Ajambari sung by himself and Melina Rai for the movie Gangster Blues starring Aashirman DS Joshi and Anna Sharma, and Okhati from the movie Mr. Jholay starring Dayahang Rai.

Kali is a mechanical engineer by education, and worked at the famous Tilganga Institute of Ophthalmology in Kathmandu for over a decade before becoming a full-time musician since 2015.

He has been providing his songs for popular franchises named kabaddi (has 4 sequels) and Jatra (has 3 sequels) every time a new sequel comes out. His popular songs for those franchise include Malai maya pirati (Kabaddi), jiban jatra ho (Jatra) sustari (Kabaddi) Sathi (jatra).

In 2019 baskota's song "sali man paryo" from the film "Ghamad Shere" was the most popular song of that year and now it is among top 5 most viewed songs in Nepal. His other songs like "Maya pirari, insta ko photo and funfunny" were also very popular.

His fame didn't seem to quit even after two heavy lockdowns. From 2020 to 2022 he released many viral songs among which his song Maya raicha ra from "Fulbari" got the most recognition.

In 2023, he wrote and sang a song named Chari Basyo for a film Jaari.

In 2024 too, he has provided music for a very popular song, "Rai maila" for a film "gau aayeko bato".

== Awards ==
| Year | Ceremony | Category | Work | Result |
|---|---|---|---|---|
| 2007 | Hits Fm Awards | Best Pop Composition | Chahana Sakio | Nominated |
| 2010 | Hits Fm Awards | Best Pop Composition | Ke Nai Runu Chha Ra | Nominated |
| 2013 | Hits Fm Awards | Best Song Originally Recorded for a Movie Sound Track | Ekkai Chin Ma | Nominated |
| N/A | 5th Annual Annapurna Awards | Best Pop Composition | Ke Nai Runu Chha Ra | Won |
| 2014 | Nefta Awards | Best Music Composer | Malati Ko Bhatti | Nominated |
| 2015 | Hits Fm Awards | Best Song Originally Recorded for a Motion Picture Soundtrack | Jaalma | Won |
| 2015 | Pratibha Puraskar | N/A | Chhinnalata Nava | Won |

== Discographys ==
- Entrance (2009) with Sashi Rawal
- Resham Filili (Original Motion Picture Soundtrack) (2016)
