= Kabaddi 4: The Final Match =

Nepalese film directed by Ram Babu Gurung

- Theatrical release poster
- Nepali: कबड्डी ४: द फाइनल म्याच
- Directed by: Ram Babu Gurung
- Written by: Ram Babu Gurung; Upendra Subba
- Produced by: Mani Ram Pokharel; Om Chand Rauniyar; Sushma Gurung; Bishal Gurung; Madhu Mijar
- Starring: Dayahang Rai; Saugat Malla; Miruna Magar; Bijay Baral; Buddhi Tamang
- Cinematography: Shailendra D Karki
- Edited by: Nimesh Shrestha
- Music by: Rohit Shakya
- Production company: Baasuri Films
- Distributed by: Byankatesh Entertainment; Kafiya Films; Tea Folks Films
- Release date: 27 May 2022
- Running time: 137 minutes
- Country: Nepal
- Language: Nepali
- Budget: est.रू3 crore
- Box office: est.रू21.40 crore

Kabaddi 4: The Final Match (Nepali: कबड्डी ४: द फाइनल म्याच) is a 2022 Nepali romantic comedy-drama film directed by Ram Babu Gurung, who co-wrote the screenplay with Upendra Subba. The film, which is the fourth and final installment in the Kabaddi franchise, is produced by Mani Ram Pokharel, Om Chand Rauniyar, Sushma Gurung, Bishal Gurung, and Madhu Mijar under the banners of Baasuri Films in association with Sushma Production Global. It features an ensemble cast of Dayahang Rai, Saugat Malla, Miruna Magar, Buddhi Tamang and Bijay Baral.

Kabaddi 4 had a budget of रू3 crore making it one of the most expensive Nepali films. The film received mixed to positive response from critics with praise directed towards screenplay, performance of Dayahang Rai and Saugat Malla, music, authenticity and direction of Gurung but some critics criticized the film's story to be less gripping as compared to previous films. It became the highest grossing Nepali film in Nepal and second highest-grossing film in Nepal ever, behind Baahubali 2: The Conclusion.

== Plot ==
After years of romantic failures, Kaji has seemingly given up on marriage and resolves to become a Buddhist monk to seek peace and a solitary life. This decision however throws his family into crisis, as his parents are desperate for him to marry and continue the family line. His mother, fearing his father will remarry himself, successfully pressurizes Kaji's two loyal friends, Chhantyal and B.K, to bring him home.

Kaji returns and resumes his duty as the school chairman, where a new teacher named Shanti has been appointed. Shanti is outwardly flirtatious and shows a clear interest in Kaji, but he, still heartbroken from his past attempts, consistently brushes off her advances.

The romantic tension escalates with the return of Bam Kaji, Kaji's cousin and perennial rival, who has come back to the village with a master's degree in Mathematics. Bam Kaji, initially planning to return to the city after a few days of stay, instantly falls for Shanti upon seeing her. He quickly manages to secure a job as Math teacher at the same school to be near her, creating a classic love triangle dynamic where Bam Kaji pursues Shanti, but Shanti pursues Kaji.

The narrative shifts when Shanti asks Kaji to accompany her on a trip to her village to visit her mother. Kaji initially refuses but agrees when his mother insists its his duty to ensure the teacher's safe travel. To Kaji's annoyance, Bam Kaji joins the journey, and the romantic rivalry heats up during the long trek. Upon reaching Shanti's village, they are surprised when Shanti's mother assumes Kaji and Shanti are planning to marry, a notion Kaji quickly and awkwardly denies.

The plot comes to a head after Bam Kaji, driven by jealousy and anger over being rejected by Shanti and fired from the job by Kaji, attempts to resolve the rivalry violently. When this fails, he resorts to a more traditional and drastic measure: capture marriage, an archaic custom still practiced in some parts of the culture. Bam Kaji successfully abducts Shanti and brings her to his house for a forced marriage ceremony.

Kaji's father tells him about the incident and blames him for not being man enough to protect Shanti. This desperate act finally triggers a realization in Kaji that he does, in fact, love Shanti. With the help of his friends, Kaji interrupts the ceremony with a clever ruse, a false alarm about a dead body, creating a distraction that allows him to escape with Shanti. A chase ensues, but Bam Kaji is tricked, only catching a glimpse of B.K and Chhantyal in disguise.

The closing scene finds Kaji and Shanti at the lakeside. Shanti expresses her gratitude for his rescue and gently urges him to articulate his feelings for her. Kaji declines the request, believing the truth of his emotions is already obvious to her, rendering any further words redundant.

== Cast ==
- Dayahang Rai as Kaji
- Saugat Malla as Bam Kaji
- Miruna Magar as Shanti
- Buddhi Tamang as Chhantyal
- Bijay Baral as B.K.
- Puskar Gurung as Mukhiya, Kaji's father
- Kabita Ale as Mukhini, Kaji's mother
- Maotse Gurung as Laal Kaji, Bam Kaji's father
- Jayananda Lama as Shanti's uncle
- Gaumaya Gurung as Pampha
- Kamal Mani Nepal as B.K's father
- Prakash Ghimire as School Principal
- Upendra Subba as Jhakri

== Soundtrack ==
The background score of the film is provided by Rohit Shakya while the music is composed by Kali Prasad Baskota, SD Yogi and Anupam Sharma. First song titled "Keshari" was released on March 7, 2022, followed by "Maya Ko Bhasha" on June 18 and "Sustari" on November 6.

No.	Title	Lyrics	Music	Singer	Length
1.	"Keshari"	Ram Abiral Bista	SD Yogi	SD Yogi	4:50
2.	"Maya Ko Bhasha"	Anmol Gurung	Anmol Gurung	Anmol Gurung	4:25
3.	"Sustari"	Kali Prasad Baskota, Sabin Ektarey	Kali Prasad Baskota	Kali Prasad Baskota	3:08

== Box office ==
The film broke several records at the box office including the highest opening day collection in Nepal with रू2.90 crore. With the lifetime box office collection of the film in Nepal as रू21.40 crore, it became the highest grossing Nepali film ever. It missed out on becoming the highest grossing film ever in Nepal, finishing second to Baahubali 2: The Conclusion. These records of both films were surpassed by Purna Bahadur Ko Sarangi in 2024.

== Controversy ==
Miruna Magar slapped a Tibetan Buddhist monk (lama) in public claiming that he had touched her inappropriately. The monk asked her for forgiveness and she filed a case against him but later it took back. Many thought this was an act of publicity by the actress and the film was banned in the Indian state of Sikkim (which has a significant Tibetan Buddhist minority) on the request of lama associations.
