= Ram Babu Gurung =

Nepalese film director

- राम बाबु गुरुङ
- Born: Rumjatar, Okhaldhunga, Nepal
- Occupations: Director; Actor; Writer; Producer
- Years active: 2006–present

Ram Babu Gurung (Nepali: राम बाबु गुरुङ) is a Nepalese writer and director known for his work in Nepali cinema. His debut as a director was critically acclaimed 2013 film Kabaddi.

== Filmography ==
Year	Film	Role	Notes	Ref(s)
2006	Anagarik	Director	Community-based fiction film.	
2013	Kabaddi	Director, writer	First commercial film.	
2015	Kabaddi Kabaddi	Director, writer		
2016	Purano Dunga	Director, writer		
2016	Taandro	Story, actor		
2016	Jhumkee	Writer		
2017	Gangster Blues	Actor		
2017	Ghampani	Executive Producer		
2018	Mr Jholay	Director, writer		
2019	Kabaddi Kabaddi Kabaddi	Director, writer		
2019	Saili	Director, writer		
2020	Senti Virus	Director		
2022	Kabaddi 4: The Final Match	Director, writer		
2023	Fulbari	Director, writer		
2023	Jaari	Producer		

== Awards ==
Year	Award	Category	Nominated work	Result
2015	D-Cine Awards	Best Screenplay	Kabaddi	Won
2015	D-Cine Awards	Jury Award	Kabaddi	Won
2015	National Film Award by Film Development Board	Best Writer	Kabaddi	Won (with Upendra Subba)
