= Buddhi Tamang =

Nepalese comedian and actor

- बुद्धि तामाङ
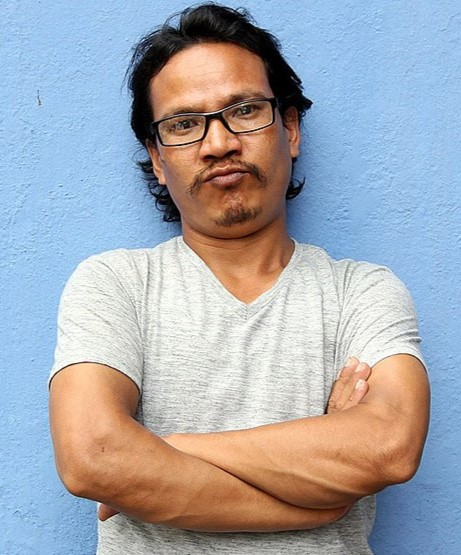
- Tamang in 2016
- Born: 2 March 1983 (age 43)
- Spouse: Anu Theeng (m. 2022)

Buddhi Tamang (Nepali: बुद्धि तामाङ) (born 2 March 1983) is a Nepalese actor and a theatrical performer. He has appeared in numerous Nepali feature films, some music videos, television commercials and print advertisements.

== Career ==
Buddhi Tamang started his career by joining a theater in Kathmandu and worked there for many years before making it onto the silver screen. He came to the limelight with the success of the hit film Kabaddi Kabaddi . His dialogue “Hait” started trending and helped him to gain recognition. He mainly works in a supporting role. He also had a role as "Hanumane" in the hit Nepali sitcom Television series Meri Bassai.

== Filmography ==
=== Films ===
Year	Film	Role	Notes
2013	Saanghuro	Nare	
2014	Kabaddi	Chhantyal	
2014	Talakjung vs Tulke	Hanuman	
2014	Shaabhala	Ram	Short Film
2015	Woda Number 6	Buddhi	
2015	Taandro	—	
2015	Kabaddi Kabaddi	Chhantyal	
2016	Chhakka Panja	Buddhi	
2016	Purano Dunga	Bideshi	
2016	Bijuli Machine	Ram Dai	
2017	Ghampani	Nima	
2017	A Mero Hajur 2	Shree Dharmendra	
2017	Dui Rupaiyan	Bom Bahadur Tamang	
2017	Mero Paisa Khoi	—	
2017	Chhakka Panja 2	Buddhi	
2018	Mr. Jholay	Guna Prasad	
2018	Panche Baja	Sahile	
2018	Kohalpur Express	Sher Bahadur	
2018	Damaruko Dandibiyo	Mukhiya	
2018	Chhakka Panja 3	Buddhi	
2018	Nai Nabhannu La 5	—	
2018	Changa	—	
2018	Jai Bhole	Brush lee	
2018	The Karma	—	
2018	Matti Mala	Kalu Dai	
2019	Saili	—	
2019	Bir Bikram 2	Bagh Bahadur	
2019	Password	—	
2019	Chha Maya Chhapakkai	Farmer	Guest appearance in song
2019	Kabaddi Kabaddi Kabaddi	Chhantyal	
2020	Senti Virus	Dhrubaram's neighbour	
2022	Mantra	—	
2022	Life in LA	—	
2022	Kabaddi 4: The Final Match	Chhantyal	
2022	Krishna Leela		
2023	Chhakka Panja 4	Buddhi	
2026	Prabasi Jiwan (Foreign Life)		
2026	Hattichhap		
2026	Pariwartan		
2026	Viral Gorkhey		
