= Dayahang Rai =

Nepalese movie actor

- दयाहाङ् राई
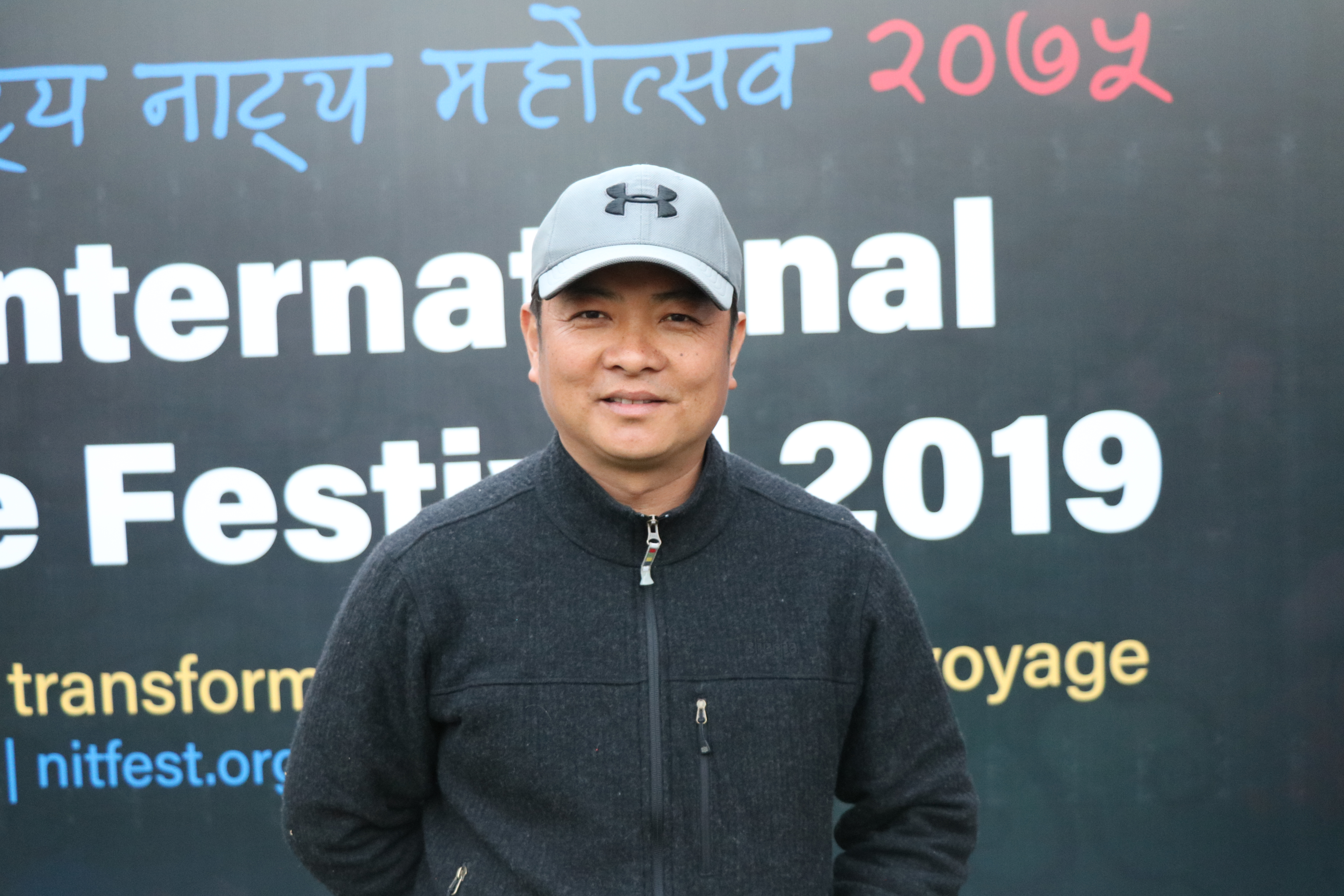
- Dayahang Rai at International Theater Festival 2019
- Born: 13 April 1980 (age 46); Khawa, Bhojpur District, Nepal
- Occupations: Actor, director, play writer
- Years active: 2002–present
- Organisation(s): Mandala Theatre, Nepal
- Known for: Kabaddi 4: The Final Match; Jaari
- Spouse: Benuka Rai (m. 2006)
- Children: 2

Dayahang Rai (Nepali: दयाहाङ् राई; born 13 April 1980) is a Nepalese actor, director, and playwright. He is one of the most popular actors in Nepal. He has starred in over 70 films and is one of the leading contemporary actors of Nepal. He has received various accolades throughout his acting career. Dayahang is a theatrical actor who made the jump to Nepali cinemas.

Dayahang rose to prominence from the television series Yuva, Dalan, and Hamro Team. He made his film debut with Anagarik (2006). Dasdhunga (2010) was fairly successful, but Loot (2012) turned out to be the turning point in his career, which was a massive hit. Since then he has starred in many commercially successful films Chhadke (2013), Badhshala (2013), Karkash (2013), Jholey (2014), Kabaddi (2013) and its sequels Kabaddi Kabaddi (2015) and Kabaddi Kabaddi Kabaddi(2019), Talakjung vs Tulke (2014), Woda Number 6 (2015), How Funny (2016), Bir Bikram (2016), Loot 2 (2017), Kaanchi (2018) and Jatrai Jatra (2019). The movie White Sun (2016) which he starred in, was the first ever Nepali movie entered for the Academy Awards.

Dayahang Rai is the recipient of numerous awards including three National Awards for best supporting actor in 2009 for Dasdhunga; best actor in 2015 for Sambodhan, and best actor in 2016 for Kabaddi Kabaddi.

== Early life ==
Dayahang Rai was born on 13 April 1980, in Khawa, Bhojpur district in Eastern Nepal to Tilak Ram Rai and Chandra Devi Rai. He is the middle child of the family. He has two younger sisters and an older brother. His family belongs to the Bantawa Rai people of Kirat ethnicity of Nepal. Dayahang completed his lower secondary-level studies from Pashupati Lower Secondary School in Khawa VDC, Bhojpur District, and high school from Annapurna Secondary School, Dilpa, Bhojpur in 1998. He completed his intermediate level studies at Bhojpur Multiple College as a Geography Major. He moved to Kathmandu in 2001 and joined The Ratna Rajya Campus (now Manawiki Campus) as Journalism Major.

Dayahang's mother used to tell him fairy tales as a child, which fascinated him greatly and fostered his imagination. He was interested in acting from his early childhood. He got into drama at school. Dayahang's heart was not in his studies, so he decided to follow his dream and pursue a career in theatre and stage.

== Acting career ==
=== Theatre ===
After participating in the play Talakjung vs Tulke as an actor and Dhiren Raja as co-actor, Dayahang joined Actors’ Studio (a platform for theater artists in Nepal) in 2007. He is now affiliated to Mandala Theatre, Nepal, which he co-founded with Rajan Khatiwada and Dhiren Raja (Limbu).

=== Films ===
Dayahang's first foray into screen acting was Yuwa. followed by Dalan, a series directed by Nabin Subba in 2003. The series was broadcast by Nepal Television in 2009. He started his big screen career as the lead in Anagarik (2006), a feature film by Ram Babu Gurung, which won two awards at the Nepal International Indigenous Film Festival. Dayahang followed it by starring in the romantic film Mero Euta Saathi Chha (2009) directed by Sudarshan Thapa. Dayahang received considerable recognition for his role in the movie Dasdhunga (2009) starring Saugat Malla and Anup Baral. He received his first National Award for Dasdhunga for the best supporting actor. He starred as a doctor in Acharya (2010), directed by Prashant Rasaily and Mero Love Story in 2010.

In 2012, Dayahang appeared in the hit Nepali film Loot. Dayahang also co-wrote the dialogues in this film. His character Gofle, earned him positive reviews from critics and audiences alike. The film was a turning point in his career. He won the Popular Award for Loot. Dayahang gained more popularity for his role in the film Highway (2012). The 2013 film Chhadke brought Dayahang and other well-known actors of Nepali cinema like Saugat Malla and Arpan Thapa together. Badhshala (2013) marked the first of Dayahang's films on the Maoist-led Civil War in Nepal. The film was banned following objections from the Nepali army. In Karkash, released in 2013, Dayahang took the role of a drummer of a struggling music band. In the critically acclaimed film Saanghuro (2013), Dayahang had a minor role, but a notable one for sure. Dayahang and Aryan Sigdel starred in the suspense thriller Loafer in 2013. Mukhauta (2013), was a star-studded film that had critically acclaimed actors of Nepali industry like Dayahang, Rajesh Hamal, Saugat Malla, and Sunil Thapa.

Dayahang's two films Kabaddi (2013) and its sequel Kabaddi Kabaddi (2015) turned out to be massive hits in Nepal and abroad. He received his third National Award for best actor for Kabaddi Kabaddi. In 2014, Dayahang teamed up with Priyanka Karki in the commercially successful Jhole. Dayahang won his second National Award for the film Sambodhan (2014) in the best actor category. The critically acclaimed Talakjung vs Tulke (2014) showcased Dayahang's versatility as an actor against the backdrop of the Nepali Civil War. In 2015, Dayahang acted in Fanko, a critically acclaimed film also starring Saugat Malla, Priyanka Adhikari, and Keki Adhikari.

In 2016, Dayahang acted in the critically acclaimed White Sun (Seto Surya) based on the civil war in Nepal, which was Nepal's submission to the 2018 Oscars in the Best Foreign Language Film category. Dayahang acted in the Ram Babu Gurung film Purano Dunga (2016), which was a huge commercial success. The sequel to Loot was released in 2017 as Loot 2 with Dayahang returning as the Gofle. Dayahang teamed up with Keki Adhikari in Ghampani in 2017, which became a commercial success and was critically acclaimed. The action thriller Lappan Chhappan (2017) saw Dayahang in the role of a police officer chasing a mobster. In Taandro (2017), Dayahang acted in his fourth film on Nepal's civil war, which was critically acclaimed.

== Personal life ==
Dayahang Rai is married to Nepali singer Benuka Rai (2006). They have two sons, named Samduhang Rai & Sinchunghang Rai.

== Awards and nominations ==
| Year | Ceremony | Category | Film | Result |
|---|---|---|---|---|
| 2009 | National Film Awards (Nepal) | Best supporting actor | Dasdhunga | Won |
| 2015 | National Film Awards (Nepal) | Best actor | Sambodhan | Won |
| 2016 | National Film Awards (Nepal) | Best actor | Kabaddi Kabaddi | Won |
| 2016 | LG Award | Best actor | Kabaddi Kabaddi | Won |
