= Mundre Ko Comedy Club =

Nepali stand-up comedy and talk show

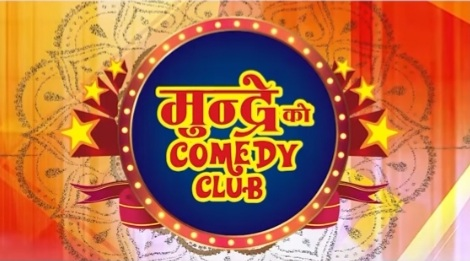
- Title Card of Mundre ko Comedy Club
- मुन्द्रेको कमेडी क्लब
- Genre: Sketch comedy Chat show
- Created by: Jeetu Nepal
- Written by: Jeetu Nepal
- Directed by: Ravi Shrestha
- Presented by: Jeetu Nepal
- Country of origin: Nepal
- Original language: Nepali
- No. of seasons: 2
- No. of episodes: 132

Production
- Producer: Rabindra Kumar Rijal 'Shashi'
- Camera setup: Multi-camera
- Running time: 45 minutes (approx)
- Production company: Key Entertainment

Original release
- Network: Nepal Television
- Release: 5 November 2018 – 8 November 2021

Mundre Ko Comedy Club was a Nepali stand-up comedy and talk show broadcast by Nepal Television. Hosted by Jeetu Nepal, the first season of the show had its premiere broadcast on 5 November 2018. While the show ended on the 8th of November 2021. It was one of the most viewed television programs in Nepal. Season 3 was expected to premier on 16 March 2023.

== Format ==
=== Series overview ===
Season	No. of episodes	Originally broadcast (Nepal)	
Season	No. of episodes	First aired	Last aired
1	76	8 November 2018	6 April 2020
2	56	12 October 2020	8 November 2021

Mundre Ko Comedy Club featured Jeetu Nepal and his team of comedians, including Rajaram Poudel, Umesh Rai, Rajendra Nepali, Khadga Bahadur Pun Magar and Lekhmani Trital. Deepa Shree Niraula was the permanent guest of the show but was replaced by Karishma Manandhar in season 2.

== Cast ==
Main

=== Season 1 ===
- Jitu Nepal as Host
- Deepa Shree Niraula as permanent guest/Chairperson(अध्यक्ष ज्यू)
- Rajaram Poudel as Landlord(घरबेटी अङ्कल)
- Rajendra Nepali as Latte(लट्टे)
- Umesh Rai as Phulandeki Aama(फुलन्देकी आमा)
- Lunibha Tuladhar as Akbari(अकबरी)
- Sandhya Budha as Kauli Budi(काउली बुडी)
- Shivahari Bairagi as Jatte(जट्टे)

=== Season 2 ===
- Jitu Nepal as Host
- Karishma Manandhar as permanent guest/Chairperson(अध्यक्ष ज्यू)
- Umesh Rai as Phulandeki Aama(फुलन्देकी आमा)
- Khadga Bahadur Pun Magar as Khabapu
- Lekhmani Trital as Ramesh Uncle ko chorro
- Rajendra Nepali as Latte(लट्टे)

== Season 1 ==
No.	Guest(s)	Telecast date	Featured promotion
1	Deepak Raj Giri	5 November 2018	Special appearance
2	Kedar Ghimire and Karishma Manandhar	12 November 2018	Special appearance
3	Keki Adhikari	19 November 2018	Promotion of Kohalpur Express
4	Shiva Pariyar	27 November 2018	Special appearance
5	Barsha Raut	3 December 2018	Promotion of Jatrai Jatra
6	Salon Basnet, Binod Neupane and Sahara Shirpaili	10 December 2018	Promotion of Sushree Sampati
7	Sitaram Kattel and Kunjana Ghimire	17 December 2018	Special appearance
8	Ravi Oad, Bikram Baral and Asmita Adhikari	24 December 2018	Special appearance
9	Shrinkhala Khatiwada	31 December 2018	Special appearance
10	Rabindra Jha and Dayab Shah	7 January 2019	Promotion of Chauka Dau
11	Pashupati Sharma	14 January 2019	Special appearance
12	Deepak Bajracharya	21 January 2019	Special appearance
13	Manoj Gajurel, Rajaram Poudel, Amrit Dhungana and Karuna Shrestha	28 January 2019	Promotion of Saya Kada Dus
14	Aastha Raut	4 February 2019	Special Appearance
15	Sandip Chhetri	12 February 2019	Special Appearance
16	Ram Krishna Dhakal	18 February 2019	Special Appearance
17	Bhuwan K.C. and Anmol K.C.	25 February 2019	Promotion of Captain
18	Komal Oli and Sailendra Simkhada	4 March 2019	Special Appearance
19	Kulendra BK	11 March 2019	Special Appearance
20	Dilip Rayamajhi and Niruta Singh	18 March 2019	Special Appearance
21	Harihar Adhikari and Kristin Poudel	25 March 2019	Promotion of Subha Love
22	Jassita Gurung and Pradeep Khadka	1 April 2019	Promotion of Love Station
23	Salin Man Baniya, Salon Basnet and Mallika Mahat	8 April 2019	Promotion of Yatra: A Musical Vlog
24	Pramod Kharel	15 April 2019	Special Appearance
25	Rajesh Hamal	22 April 2019	Special Appearance
26	Kiran K.C., Shivahari Poudel and Krishna Murari Dhungel	29 April 2019	Promotion of Dal Bhat Tarkari
27	Tanka Budathoki, Ashok Darji and AR Budathoki	6 May 2019	Special Appearance
28	Priyanka Karki and Ayushman Joshi	13 May 2019	Promotion of Prem Diwas
29	Bipin Karki, Barsha Raut and Rabindra Singh Baniya	20 May 2019	Promotion of Jatrai Jatra
30	Barsha Siwakoti, Najir Hussain and Buddhi Tamang	27 May 2019	Promotion of Bir Bikram 2
31	Rajesh Payal Rai	3 June 2019	Special Appearance
32	Paul Shah and Aanchal Sharma	10 June 2019	Special Appearance
33	Wilson Bikram Rai	17 June 2019	Special Appearance
34	Melina Rai and Rajan Raj Siwakoti	24 June 2019	Special Appearance
35	Sunil Kumar Thapa, Jharana Thapa and Suhana Thapa	2 July 2019	Promotion of A Mero Hajur 3
36	Karishma Manandhar and Shanta Chaudhary	8 July 2019	Special Appearance
37	Anubhav Regmi and Ayush K.C.	15 July 2019	Special Appearance
38	Madan Krishna Shrestha, Rinku Bajrachrya Shrestha Yaman Shrestha, and Sarana Shrestha	22 July 2019	Special Appearance
39	Bijaya Lama	30 July 2019	Special Appearance
40	Sugam Pokharel	5 August 2019	Special Appearance
41	Anju Panta	12 August 2019	Special Appearance
42	Anoop Bikram Shahi and Namrata Shrestha	19 August 2019	Promotion of Xira
43	Samragyee RL Shah and Puspa Khadka	26 August 2019	Promotion of Maruni
44	Komal Oli, Manju Poudel and Pragya Oli	2 September 2019	Special Appearance
45	Hari Bansha Acharya and Ramila Pathak Aacharya	9 September 2019	Special Appearance
46	Wilson Bikram Rai, Dayahang Rai and Upasana Singh Thakuri	16 September 2019	Promotion of Kabaddi Kabaddi Kabaddi
47	Indira Joshi	23 September 2019	Special Appearance
48	Pooja Sharma and Aakash Shrestha	30 September 2019	Promotion of Poi Paryo Kale
49	Deepak Raj Giri, Kedar Ghimire and Supushpa Bhatta	7 October 2019	Promotion of Cha Maya Chappakkai
50	Hemanta Sharma	14 October 2019	Special Appearance
51	Shristi Shrestha and Aakash Shrestha	21 October 2019	Promotion of Poi Paryo Kale
52	Santosh Panta, Rama Thapaliya, Krishna Kadel and Indreni Team	28 October 2019	Special Appearance
53	Kumar Kattel, Arjun Ghimire and Rakshya Shrestha	4 November 2019	Special Appearance
54	Nischal Basnet and Swastima Khadka	11 November 2019	Promotion of Ghamand Shere
55	Saroj Khanal, Bishnu Sapkota, Sahel Shrestha and Kusum Raut	18 November 2019	Promotion of MR. Nepali
56	Aamir Gautam, Sumi Moktan, Sania Singh and Hari Humagain	25 November 2019	Promotion of Sarauto
57	Raju Lama	2 December 2019	Special Appearance
58	Neer Shah	9 December 2019	Special Appearance
59	Sandeep Lamichhane	16 December 2019	Special Appearance
60	Prakash Saput and Shanti Shree Pariyar	23 December 2019	Special Appearance
61	Milan Newar and Mina Nirula	30 December 2019	Special Appearance
62	Durgesh Thapa and Priti Ale	6 January 2020	Special Appearance
63	Anushka Shrestha	13 January 2020	Special Appearance
64	Himal Sagar and Trishna Gurung	20 January 2020	Special Appearance
65	Hari Niraula, Sagar Lamsal and Piyana Aacharya	27 January 2020	Special Appearance
66	Bipin Karki and Laxmi Bardewa	3 February 2020	Promotion of Selfie King
67	Mahabir Pun	10 February 2020	Special Appearance
68	Dipendra K. Khanal and Surakshya Panta	17 February 2020	Promotion of Aama
69	Tulsi Ghimire	24 February 2020	Special Appearance
70	Paul Shah and Pooja Sharma	2 March 2020	Promotion of Ma Yasto Geet Gauchu
71	Anju Panta, Ram Krishna Dhakal and Alok Shree	9 March 2020	Promotion of Nepal Star
72	Raju Pariyar, Babita Baniya and Shankar Chhetri	16 March 2020	Special Appearance
73	Dr. Hem Chandra Ojha and Dr. Poma Thapa	23 March 2020	Special Appearance
74	LP Bhanu Sharma and Ramesh Nepal	16 March 2020	Special Appearance
75	Shweta Khadka	30 March 2020	Special Appearance
76	Badri Pangeni	6 April 2020	Special Appearance

== Season 2 ==
No.	Guest(s)	Telecast date	Featured promotion
1	Rekha Thapa	12 October 2020	Special appearance
2	Nishan Bhattrai and Smita Dahal	19 October 2020	Special appearance
3	Dilip Rayamajhi and Gauri Malla	26 October 2020	Promotion of Dancing with the Stars Nepal
4	Rishi Dhamala and Aliza Gautam	2 November 2020	Special appearance
5	Ramesh Prasai	9 November 2020	Special appearance
6	Anuradha Koirala	16 November 2020	Special appearance
7	Yogi Bikashananda	23 November 2020	Special appearance
8	Aanchal Sharma and Udip Shrestha	30 November 2020	Special appearance
9	Ramji Khad and Madhu Chhetri	8 December 2020	Special appearance
10	Suraj Singh Thakuri	14 December 2020	Special appearance
11	Kumar Basnet	21 December 2020	Special appearance
12	Paul Shah and Durgesh Thapa	28 December 2020	Special appearance
13	Rajesh Hamal	4 January 2021	Special appearance
14	Sapana Roka Magar and Prakash Ghimire	11 January 2021	Special appearance
15	Satya Raj Aacharya and Swaroop Raj Aacharya	18 January 2021	Special appearance
16	Jyoti Magar	25 January 2021	Special appearance
17	Daman Rupakheti, Nirmala Shrestha and Surendra KC	1 February 2021	Promotion of Meri Bassai
18	Sunita Dulal and Khooman Adhikari	8 February 2021	Special appearance
19	Manoj Gajurel	15 February 2021	Special appearance
20	Krishna Kandel and Indreni Team	22 February 2021	Promotion of Indreni
21	Shivahari Poudel and Manoj Aacharya	1 March 2021	Special appearance
22	Elina Chauhan and Samkishya Adhikari	8 March 2021	Special appearance
23	Khem Century and Suman Thapa	15 March 2021	Special appearance
24	Khagendra Lamichhane	22 March 2021	Special appearance
25	Prajapati Parajuli	29 March 2021	Special appearance

== See also ==
Similar shows

- Comedy Club with Champions
- Comedy Champion
