= Chhakka Panja (franchise) =

Nepali film series

- Nepali: छक्का पन्जा
- Directed by: Deepa Shree Niraula
- Country: Nepal
- Language: Nepali
- Budget: रु 9.85 Crore (US$ 741k) [5 films]
- Box office: रु 90.03 Crore

Chhakka Panja is a film franchise directed by Deepa Shree Niraula and is one of the biggest franchises of Nepali cinema. The first film released in September 2016 was Chhakka Panja, which became the highest-grossing film in Nepal until Chhakka Panja 3 was released in 2018. The second installment, Chhakka Panja 2, arrived in August 2017. The third installment named Chhakka Panja 3 arrived in October 2018 and became the highest grossing Nepali film of all time for 4 years until it was broken by another famous franchise film,Kabaddi 4: The Final Match. Currently, Chhakka Panja Franchise has total grossed of more than 50 Crores. It is the first franchise to do so and is followed by Kabaddi Franchise. Chhakka Panja 4 songs (Chhakka Panja 4 - Promotional Song, Darshan Salam and Sirupatey Jungama) are also breaking records and are trending on Youtube.

The fifth part of the franchise, Chhakka Panja 5, was released in 2024. The Chhakka Panja (franchise) is the highest grossing franchise in Nepal after collecting close to रु 90.03 crore in total as of 2024.

== Films ==
=== Chhakka Panja ===
The film is first part of Chakka Panja series and tells the story of Raja (Giri), a rich but illiterate man and his group of friends, Ateet (Poudel), Saraswati (Nepal), Magne (Ghimire) and Buddhi (Tamang). Raja, who is devoted to the chase, gives in to family pressure and gets married, but different events unfolds in his and his friends' life that gives rise to a comedy of errors and situations.

=== Chhakka Panja 2 ===
It is the second film in the Chhakka Panja series. The film stars Deepak Raj Giri, Kedar Ghimire, Buddhi Tamang Priyanka Karki, Swastima Khadka, debutant Swaroop Purush Dhakal and Barsha Raut in the lead roles.

=== Chhakka Panja 3 ===
It is the third film of the Chhakka Panja series. The film tells the story of Youk (played by Deepika Prasai) daughter of headmaster and popular news reporter who marries the rich and illiterate Raja, son of big politician of her village and tries to improve conditions at a government school but faces hurdles in her goal. The film met with positive response from critics and audience for its story, screenplay, social message, comedy and performance of the cast especially of Kedar Ghimire.

=== Chhakka Panja 4 ===
It is the fourth film in Chakka Panja franchise. Produced by Dipendra Khaniya, Kesav Neupane, Kedar Ghimire, and Nirmal Sharma under the banner of Aama Saraswoti Movies & IME Present, film was released on 3 March 2023, alongside another Nepali film 2.0 Chhadke. The film had biggest opening of 2023 for any film in Nepal and went on to become 2nd Highest Grossing Nepali film in Nepal and 3rd Overall in Nepal.

=== Chhakka Panja 5 ===
Produced by Keshav Neupane and Dipendra Khaniya under the banner of Aama Saraswoti Movies and IME Present, it was released on 10 October 2024, during the festival of Dashain. It stars Deepak Raj Giri, Kedar Ghimire, Deepa Shree Niraula, Barsha Siwakoti, Raja Ram Poudel, and Prakash Ghimire.

== Casts ==
This table lists the main characters who appear in the Chhakka Panja Franchise

Actors	Films				
Actors	Chhakka Panja (2016)	Chhakka Panja 2 (2017)	Chhakka Panja 3 (2018)	Chhakka Panja 4 (2023)	Chhakka Panja 5 (2024)
Deepak Raj Giri	Raja (Main)	Raja (Main)	Raja (Main)	Raja (Main)	Prithivi Bikram / Raja (Main)
Kedar Ghimire	Magne Budho (Main)	Consultancy Mama (Main)	Magne Budho (Main)	Magne Raja (Main)	Magne (Main)
Buddhi Tamang	Buddhi (Main)	Buddhi (Main)	Buddhi (Main)	Buddhi (Main)	
Priyanka Karki	Champa (Main)	Uma (Main)	Rinku (Cameo)		
Barsha Raut	Brinda (Main)	Brinda (Main)	Brinda (Cameo)		
Jeetu Nepal	Saraswati (Main)	Saraswati (Main)	Thaneshwor (Main)		
Deepa Shree Niraula	Magne's Wife (Cameo)	Magne's Wife (Cameo)	Lala (Cameo)	(Main)	(Main)
Benisha Hamal				(Main)	
Deepika Prasain			Youke Raja (Main)		
Aaryan Sigdel	Aryan (Cameo)				
Barsha Siwakoti					Roshni (Main)

=== Crew ===
Occupation	Film				
Occupation	Chhakka Panja (2016)	Chhakka Panja 2 (2017)	Chhakka Panja 3 (2018)	Chhakka Panja 4 (2023)	Chhakka Panja 5 (2024)
Director	Deepa Shree Niraula	Deepa Shree Niraula			
Producer					
Writer					
Dialogues					
Cinematography					
Editor					
Music					

== Release and reception ==
Film	Release date	Budget	Box office	Ref(s)
Chhakka Panja	9 September 2016	रु 85 Lakh (US$67.9k)	रु 16.6 Crore (US$1.32 Million)	
Chhakka Panja 2	27 August 2017	रु 1 Crore (US$79.7k)	रु 14.5 Crore (US$1.15 Million)	
Chhakka Panja 3	1 October 2018	रु 2 Crore (US$ 160k)	रु 20.3 Crore (US$1.62 Million)	
Chhakka Panja 4	3 March 2023	रु 3 Crore (US$ 228k)	रु 17.8 Crore (US$1.34)	
Chhakka Panja 5	10 Oct 2024	रु 3 core (US$ 288k)	रु 15.45 Crore (US$1.1Million)	
Total Budget and Box-office Collection		रु 9.85 Crore (US$ 741k)	रु 84.4 Crore (US$6.39 Million)	

== See also ==
- Kabaddi Franchise
