= Kedar Ghimire =

Nepalese actor

Kedar Prasad Ghimire
- केदारप्रसाद घिमिरे
- Born: 13 April 1976 (age 50); Makawanpur, Nepal
- Other name: Magne Budho
- Occupation: Actor
- Years active: 2000–present
- Spouse: Sita Devi Timalsena

Kedar Prasad Ghimire (Nepali: केदारप्रसाद घिमिरे; born 13 April 1976) is a Nepalese actor known for his work in the Nepali entertainment industry. He is mostly popular for portraying a character known as Magne Budho from his hit TV Nepali sitcom Meri Bassai and Chakka Panja series. He is one of the most popular and highest grossing actors of Nepal.

== Early life ==
Ghimire's mother left his family when he was seven years old. In 1992, Ghimire wanted to go to Kathmandu for higher study, but his house caught fire, and with it 96,000 rupees was also burnt. That was the only savings his family had. After this incident, he had no money to study in Kathmandu. He went to Kathmandu anyway, but to work. His uncle lived there and stopped him from working, allowing him to study instead. He studied law, but gave up on it shortly after because he could not pass. He also worked in construction. He did many other similar jobs, but never found success in it. He couldn't survive with any of those jobs. In 2005, he finally saw success when he started his career as an actor for the popular television program, Meri Bassai. He married actress Sita Devi Timalsena.

== Career ==
Ghimire is the script writer, actor and producer of the famous Nepali sitcom Meri Bassai. He plays a role of Magne Budho and he is popular with his dialogue "Ahile latta le diyera bari ko pata ma purydinchu" which literally means "with one kick I will throw you on the edge of field". He has also sung two songs which are based on Nepali politics. One of them is "Loktantra Ganatantra" which is broadcast in his show Meri Bassai.

Kedar Ghimire has also acted in a comedy Nepali hit movies like Cha Ekan Cha in 2013 and Oda no Cha in 2015. With Chhakka Panja becoming the biggest blockbuster in the Nepali movie industry. He was working in TV sitcom Meri Bassai as Magne budo, which he left in 2015. He is currently working on Nepali comedy web series Khas Khus. He had also acted in other famous TV serials like Tito Satya, Jire Khursani with TV comedians like Deepak Raj Giri, Sitaram Kattel, Neeta Dhungana, Jeetu Nepal. He also owns a youtube channel named after his deceased mother "Aama Agnikumari Media" since 2014.

== Filmography ==
=== Films ===
Key
†	Denotes films that have not yet been released

Year	Title	Role	Notes	Ref(s)
2008	Daud	Inspector		
2014	Chha Ekan Chha	Magne Budho		
2015	Woda Number 6	Magne Budho		
2016	Chhakka Panja	Magne Budho		
2017	Chhakka Panja 2	Cosultancy Mama		
2018	Ramkahani	Danbir		
2018	Chhakka Panja 3	Magne Budho		
2019	Cha Maya Chhapakkai	Goli Kancha		
2023	Chhakka Panja 4	Magne Budho Raja		
2024	Chhakka Panja 5			

=== Television ===
Year	Title	Role	Notes	Ref(s)
2006	Meri Bassai	Magne Budho		
2016	Khas Khus	Magne Budho		

== Discography ==
Year	Title	Distributor	Notes
2015	Golveda Ko Chatani	Highlights Nepal	
2015	Lauka Faleko	Highlights Nepal	singer
2016	Mantri Ko Salo	Gazzab TV	also singer
2020	Ishh	Aama Agni Kumari Media	
2021	A Kali Bhagau Yespali	Aama Agni Kumari Media	

== Awards ==
Year	Award	Category	Work	Result	Ref(s)
2015	Dcine Award	Best Actor in a Comic Role	Chha Ekan Chha	Nominated	
2016	Dcine Award	Best Actor in a Comic Role	Woda Number 6	Won	
2017	Dcine Award	Best Actor in a Comic Role	Chhakka Panja	Won	
2017	Kamana Film Award	Best Dialogue	Chhakka Panja	Won	
2017	Kamana Film Award	Best Actor in a Comic Role	Chhakka Panja	Won	
2018	NFDC National Film Award	"Gopalraj" Best Actor in a Comic Role	Chhakka Panja 2	Won	
2018	NFDC National Film Award	"Laxminath" Best Story / Dialogue	Chhakka Panja 2	Won	
2018	Kamana Film Award	Best Actor in a Comic Role	Chhakka Panja 2	Nominated	
2018	Kamana Film Award	Best Dialogue	Chhakka Panja 2	Nominated	
2018	Dcine Award	Best Actor in a Comic Role	Chhakka Panja 2	Won	
2020	NEFTA Film Award	Best Actor in a Comic Role	Chhakka Panja 3	Won	
2020	Kamana Film Award	Best Actor in a Comic Role	Chhakka Panja 3	Won	
