= Magne Budho =

- Meri Bassai; Chhakka Panja; Khas Khus Magne Raja Jerry On Top character
- Created by: Kedar Ghimire
- Portrayed by: Kedar Ghimire
- Voiced by: Kedar Ghimire

In-universe information
- Full name: Maganta Narayan
- Nicknames: Magne Budho, Magne
- Species: Human
- Gender: Male
- Family: Narayan
- Spouse: Maiya
- Children: Ashish/Aayusha
- Religion: Hindu
- Nationality: Nepali

Magne Budho (Nepali: माग्ने बुढो) is a fictional character on the NTV-produced television series Meri Bassai which is portrayed by comedian actor Kedar Ghimire. Magne Budho has appeared in many Nepali movies such as Cha Ekan Cha, Woda Number 6, Chhakka Panja and he has also appeared in television shows such as Khas Khus and Meri Bassai. Comedy hub. He is an old man married to Maiya and has a son named Ashish (Jureli) and a daughter Ayusha.

== Catchphrases ==
Halka Ramilo (Nepali: हल्का रमाइलो)

— Magne Budho, in Woda Number 6

Aile lattale diyera baariko paatama puryaidinchhu
(Nepali: अहिले लात्ताले दिएर बारीको पाटामा पुर्याइदिन्छु)

— Magne Budho, Meri Bassai episode 20

== Family ==
- Mayia - Wife
- Jureli - Son
- Raju Master - Brother
- Bandre - Relative
- Andre - Relative

== Filmography ==
=== Films ===
- Cha Ekan Cha
- Woda Number 6
- Chhakka Panja
- Ramkahani
- Chhakka Panja 3
- Chhakka Panja 4
- Chha maya chhapakkai
- Chhakka Panja 5
- MagneRaja
- Maitighar
- Jerry on Top

=== Television series ===
- Meri Bassai
- Khas Khus
