= Chha Ekan Chha =

- छ एकान छ
- Directed by: Dinesh D.C.
- Written by: Deepak Raj Giri
- Produced by: Deepak Raj Giri; Deepa Shree Niraula; Nirmal Sharma
- Starring: Neeta Dhungana; Deepak Raj Giri; Jitu Nepal; Kedar Ghimire; Sitaram Kattel; Shiva Hari Poudel; Sandip Chhetri
- Cinematography: Purushottam Pradhan
- Edited by: Ananta Thapaliya
- Music by: Hari Bansha Acharya
- Production company: Aama Saraswoti Movies
- Release date: January 1, 2014
- Running time: 135 minutes
- Country: Nepal
- Language: Nepali

Chha Ekan Chha (Nepali: छ एकान छ) is a 2014 Nepalese comedy film directed by Dinesh D.C. and produced by Deepak Raj Giri, Deepa Shree Niraula, and Nirmal Sharma. The film stars Neeta Dhungana in the lead role, alongside an ensemble cast of television comedians including Deepak Raj Giri, Jitu Nepal, Kedar Ghimire, Sitaram Kattel, Shiva Hari Poudel, and Sandip Chhetri. The film follows a young woman navigating dates with six different men of contrasting backgrounds and personalities.

The film marks the first feature-length film collaboration between the creators of popular Nepalese television sitcoms Tito Satya, Meri Bassai, and Jire Khursani. Its commercial performance led to the establishment of the Chhakka Panja film franchise.

== Plot ==
Astha (Neeta Dhungana) is an independent young woman whose family is looking to arrange her marriage. In her search for a partner, she meets and dates six different suitors from distinct socio-economic backgrounds and regions of Nepal. The suitors include Chanchal Pandey (Deepak Raj Giri) and Magne (Kedar Ghimire), among others. Each suitor possesses distinct personality flaws, leading to a series of misunderstandings, cultural clashes, and comedic situations. The narrative traces her interactions with each of the six men before she makes her final decision regarding marriage.

== Cast ==
- Neeta Dhungana as Astha
- Deepak Raj Giri as Chanchal Pandey
- Kedar Ghimire as Magne
- Jitu Nepal
- Sitaram Kattel
- Shiva Hari Poudel
- Sandip Chhetri
- Raj Ballav Koirala
- Rajesh Hamal (Special appearance)

== Production ==
The film was produced under the banner of Aama Saraswoti Movies, a production house established by the team behind the long-running television sitcom Tito Satya. The screenplay was written by Deepak Raj Giri, drawing elements from character types popular in domestic television comedy. The technical crew consisted of Purushottam Pradhan as director of photography and Ananta Thapaliya as film editor. Hari Bansha Acharya composed the film's musical score.

== Release and Performance ==
Chha Ekan Chha was released in theatres across Nepal on 1 January 2014.

=== Critical reception ===
The film received mixed reviews from critics upon release. Reviewers noted that while the individual performances of the established television actors were effective, the overall narrative lacked cinematic depth, relying heavily on slapstick comedy and dialogue delivery styles typical of domestic television sitcoms.

=== Box Office ===
The film achieved commercial success at the domestic box office. According to media reports, it recorded gross earnings of NRs. 7.8 million within its opening two days. The film ended its theatrical run with a total estimated gross of over NRs. 20 million in Nepal, making it one of the highest-grossing Nepalese films of 2014. Following its domestic theatrical run, the film was distributed internationally for limited screenings among Nepalese diaspora communities in the United States, the United Kingdom, and Australia.

== Impact ==
The financial success of Chha Ekan Chha established a commercial precedent in the Nepalese film industry for feature-length comedy films led by ensemble television casts. This model directly influenced the production of subsequent successful comedy films, including the Chhakka Panja series, which featured much of the same creative team.
