= Woda Number 6 =

- Theatrical release poster
- Nepali: वडा नम्बर ६
- Directed by: Ujwal Ghimire
- Starring: Kedar Ghimire; Dayahang Rai; Deepa Shree Niraula; Deepak Raj Giri; Priyanka Karki; Jeetu Nepal; Sitaram Kattel; Neer Shah; Buddhi Tamang; Wilson Bikram Rai; Shivahari Poudel
- Edited by: Gautam Raj Khadka
- Production company: Aama Saraswati Movies
- Release date: 18 September 2015
- Country: Nepal
- Language: Nepali
- Budget: रु 20 Lakhs
- Box office: रु 5 Crore

Woda Number 6 (Nepali: वडा नम्बर ६) is a 2015 Nepali film directed by Ujwal Ghimire. The film features an ensemble cast including Kedar Ghimire, Dayahang Rai, Deepa Shree Niraula, Deepak Raj Giri, Priyanka Karki, Jeetu Nepal, Sitaram Kattel, Neer Shah, Buddhi Tamang, Wilson Bikram Rai, and Shivahari Poudel in the lead roles. The film follows a group of villagers in Nuwakot during the Maoist insurgency as local politics, friendships, romance, and personal ambitions become intertwined around the election of a ward chairperson.

== Cast ==
- Deepak Raj Giri as Deep Kumar Sharma
- Kedar Ghimire as Magne Budho
- Dayahang Rai as Daya
- Priyanka Karki as Sushila
- Jeetu Nepal as Birkhe
- Sitaram Kattel as Netra Prasad
- Deepa Shree Niraula as Pratigya
- Neer Shah as Kaji
- Buddhi Tamang as Buddhi
- Wilson Bikram Rai as Bidehsi
- Shivahari Poudel

== Reception ==
=== Awards ===
Year	Award	Category	Recipient	Result	Ref(s)
2016	Dcine Awards	Best Actor in a Comic Role (Male)	Kedar Ghimire	Won	
2016	Dcine Awards	Best Actor in a Comic Role (Male)	Deepak Raj Giri	Nominated	
2016	Dcine Awards	Best Actor in a Comic Role (Male)	Sitaram Kattel	Nominated	
2016	Dcine Awards	Best Actor in a Supporting Role (Male)	Jeetu Nepal	Won	
2016	Dcine Awards	Best Actor in a Comic Role (Female)	Deepa Shree Niraula	Won	
2016	Dcine Awards	Best Dialogue	Deepak Raj Giri	Won	
2016	Dcine Awards	Best Background Score	Alish Karki	Won	
2016	Dcine Awards	Best Singer	Anju Panta	Nominated	
2016	Dcine Awards	Best Musician	Rajan Raj Shiwakoti	Nominated	
2016	Dcine Awards	Best Screenplay	Abhimanyu Neerabi	Nominated	
2016	Dcine Awards	Best Actor	Priyanka Karki	Nominated	
2016	Dcine Awards	Best Film	Woda Number 6	Nominated	
2016	Dcine Awards	Best Director	Ujwal Ghimire	Nominated	
2016	NFDC National Film Awards	Best Film	Woda Number 6	Nominated	
2016	NFDC National Film Awards	Best Director	Ujwal Ghimire	Nominated	
2016	NFDC National Film Awards	Best Actress	Priyanka Karki	Nominated	
2016	NFDC National Film Awards	Best Actress in a Supporting	Deepa Shree Niraula	Nominated	
2016	NFDC National Film Awards	Best Sound	Sunayaman Shrestha	Nominated	
2016	NFDC National Film Awards	Best Choreographer	Shankar B.C.	Nominated	
2016	NFDC National Film Awards	Best Playback Singer	Anju Panta	Won	
2016	NFDC National Film Awards	Best Musician	Rajan Raj Shiwakoti	Nominated	
2016	NEFTA Film Awards	Best Director	Ujwal Ghimire	Won	
