= Sitaram Kattel =

Nepalese comedian, actor and director

- सीताराम कट्टेल
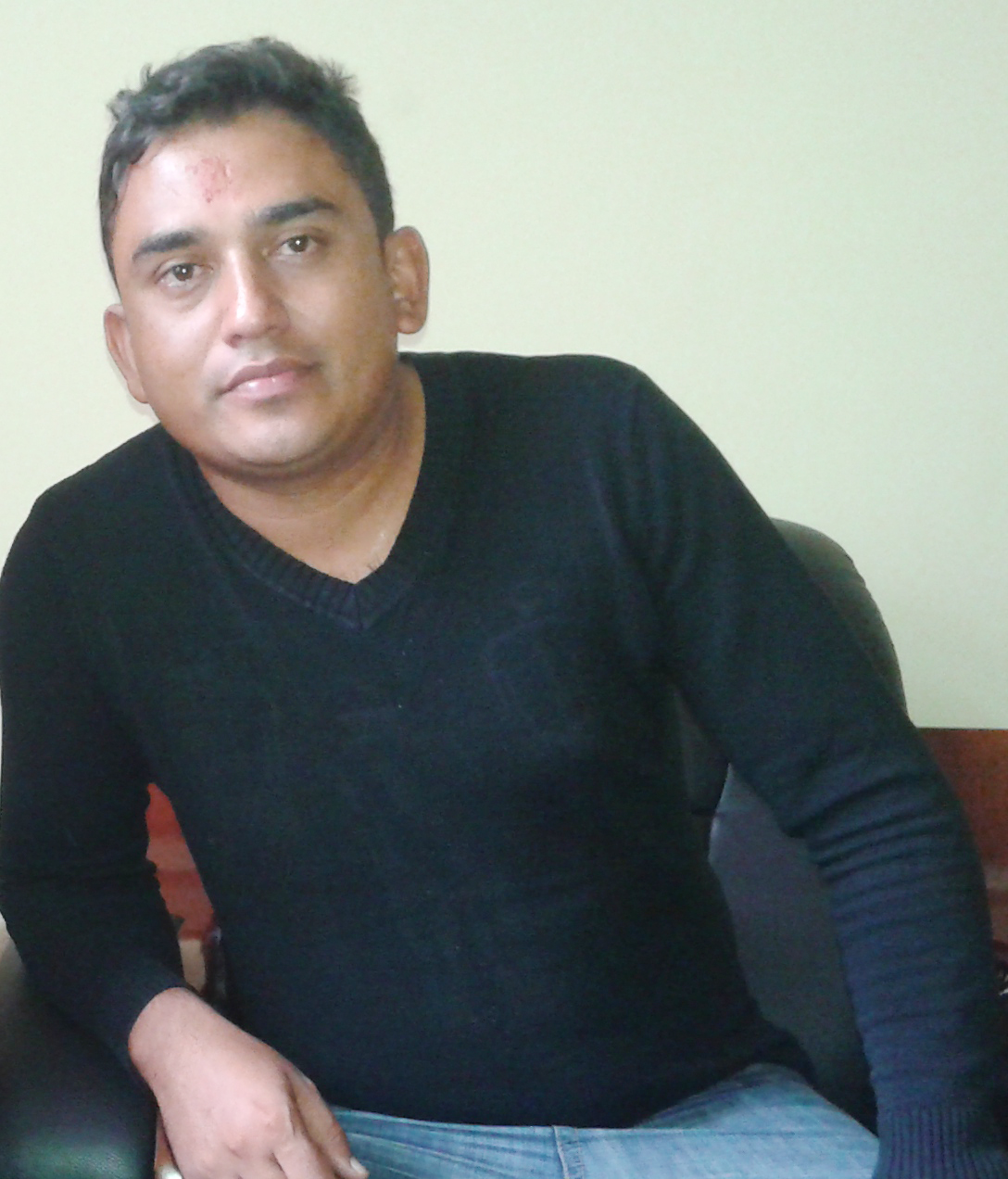
- Born: September 20, 1983 (age 42); Necha Betghari, Solukhumbu, Nepal
- Other name: Dhurmush
- Education: Masters in Arts
- Occupations: Actor; social worker; director; comedian; writer
- Spouse: Kunjana Ghimire (m. 2009)
- Children: 1

Sitaram Kattel (Nepali: सिताराम कट्टेल), popularly known by his serial name Dhurmus, is a Nepalese scriptwriter, actor, comedian, director and social worker. He was one of the main characters of the Nepali TV series Meri Bassai. He also acted in the 2013 Nepali box office hit Chha Ekan Chha in a lead role along with Deepak Raj Giri, Kedar Ghimire, Neeta Dhungana, and Jeetu Nepal. His other movie Wada Number Chha was also a blockbuster. He is also an active social worker.

== Social works ==
Kattel has worked in earthquake relief. He and his spouse have built a residence for them and other earthquake victims. He is also building international cricket stadium in Chitwan (via Dhurmus Suntali Foundation).

=== Projects ===
- Musahar Basti - Rebuild the village (Done)

== Career ==
He started his career from a hit comedy show called Geetanjali, in which he worked as a temporary scriptwriter. He also worked in Jire Khursani, a famous Nepali comedy TV series for a while. After that along with Kedar Ghimire and Daman Rupakheti he created the sitcom Meri Bassai. After the 2015 earthquake, Sitaram Kattel became highly active in social work.

The Dhurmus Suntali Foundation, established by comedians Sitaram Kattel (Dhurmus) and Kunjana Ghimire (Suntali) following the 2015 earthquake, became a symbol of rapid reconstruction and community development in Nepal. Like • Integrated Model Settlements • Gautam Buddha International Cricket Stadium • Cleanliness & Hygiene Advocacy • Emergency Disaster Relief • Bagmati River Cleaning • Marginalized Community Empowerment

== Filmography ==
=== Television ===
- Geetanjali
- Jire Khursani
- Meri Bassai (Note: Sita Ram Kattel, who played the role of Dhurmus for a long time in the hit TV show Meri Bassai, has now left the program a long time ago)
- Tito Satya

=== Films ===
Year	Title	Role	Director	Writer	Notes
2008	Daud	Cast	No	No	
2014	Chha Ekan Chha	Lead Cast	No	No	Box office hit
2014	Nai Nabhannu La 2	Supporting Cast	No	No	
2015	Woda Number 6	Cast	No	No	Blockbuster
2020	Senti Virus	Lead Cast	No	No	
2021	Ma Ta Marchhu Ki Kya Ho	Lead Cast	Yes	Yes	OTT release; also screenplay
2025	Laaj Sharanam	Lead Cast	No	No	
