= Shatru Gate =

2018 Nepalese drama comedy film

- Nepali: शत्रु गते
- Directed by: Pradip Bhattarai
- Screenplay by: Pradip Bhattarai; Deepak Raj Giri
- Story by: Hari Bansha Acharya; Pradip Bhattarai
- Produced by: Deepak Raj Giri; Deepa Shree Niraula; Narendra Kansakar; Shivahari Poudel; Yashoda Subedi; Ramila Acharya
- Starring: Hari Bansha Acharya; Deepak Raj Giri; Priyanka Karki; Deepa Shree Niraula; Madan Krishna Shrestha; Paul Shah; Aanchal Sharma
- Edited by: Mitra D. Gurung
- Music by: Kali Prasad Baskota
- Production company: Maha Sanchar
- Distributed by: Aama Saraswati Movies
- Release date: 23 March 2018 (Nepal)
- Running time: 2h 5m
- Country: Nepal
- Languages: Nepali (Primary); Maithili(Secondary parts)
- Budget: est.रू1.05 crore
- Box office: est.रू12.65 crore

Shatru Gate (Nepali: शत्रु गते) is a 2018 Nepalese drama comedy film, directed by Pradip Bhattarai and written by Deepak Raj Giri, Pradeep Bhattari, and Hari Bansha Acharya. The film is produced by Deepak Raj Giri, Deepa Shree Niraula, Narendra Kansakar, and Shivahari Poudel under the banner of MaHa Sanchar. The film stars an ensemble cast of Madan Krishna Shrestha, Hari Bansha Acharya, Deepak Raj Giri, Deepa Shree Niraula, Priyanka Karki, Paul Shah, and Aanchal Sharma in lead roles. The film was released on 23 March 2018 with a mixed response from critics but a positive response from the audience. The film became an "All Time Blockbuster" at the box office with a gross of over रु 12 Crore, making it the 9th highest-grossing Nepali film in Nepal.

== Plot ==
Suraj (Paul Shah) and Sandhya (Aanchal Sharma) are deeply in love and are about to marry. Suraj's father (Hari Bansha Acharya) does not want his son to marry a corrupt politician's daughter. Both of their lives changed forever after Rahul (Deepak Raj Giri) created a conflict between their families.

== Cast ==
- Hari Bansha Acharya as Gopal Sharma
- Madan Krishna Shrestha as Colony Owner (extended cameo appearance)
- Deepak Raj Giri as Rahul KC
- Deepa Shree Niraula as Deepa Sharma
- Priyanka Karki as Shetal KC
- Paul Shah as Suraj Sharma
- Aanchal Sharma as Sandhya
- Ramesh Ranjan Jha as Sandhya's father
- Basundhara Bhusal as Sandhya's mother
- Kiran K.C. as Security Guard
- Shivahari Poudel as Consultancy Manpower
- Rajaram Poudel as Pandit Bajey
- Narendra Kansakar
- Mohit Bamsha Acharya as Mahendra
- Yaman Shrestha as Colonist

== Reception ==
=== Box office ===
The film debuted with 3.26 crore in its first weekend. The film earned 12.54 crore on its fourth weekend and became the fourth-highest-grossing Nepali film as of 2018.

=== Critical response ===
Shashwat Pant of Onlinekhabar wrote, "Overall, the movie is disappointing. It felt like watching another sequel of Chakka Panja, mainly because most of the members of the cast were the same and everything was presented similarly." Anand Nepal of Xnepali wrote, "The movie is very entertaining, the actors have done a great job. The technical aspect of the movie is also very good."

=== Accolades ===
Year	Award	Category	Result	Result
2018	NFDC Film Award	Best Film	Won	
2018	NFDC Film Award	Best Story	Won	
2018	NFDC Film Award	Best Editor	Won	
2018	NFDC Film Award	Best Sound Mixing	Won	

== Soundtrack ==
No.	Title	Lyrics	Music	Singer(s)	Length
1.	"Rupai Mohani"	Lokraj Adhikari	Tanka Budathoki	Tanka Budathoki, Meena Niraula	4:38
2.	"Piratiko Barko"	Arjun Bhattrai	Kali Prasad Baskota	Kali Prasad Baskota	3:15
