= Chha Maya Chhapakkai =

Nepalese film directed by Dipendra Lama

- Theatrical release poster
- Nepali: छमाया छपक्कै
- Directed by: Dipendra Lama
- Written by: Deepak Raj Giri
- Story by: Dipendra Lama
- Produced by: Rohit Adhikari
- Starring: Deepak Raj Giri; Keki Adhikari; Kedar Ghimire; Jeetu Nepal; Prakash Ghimire
- Cinematography: Purshottam Pradhan
- Edited by: Bipin Malla
- Production company: Rohit Adhikari Films
- Distributed by: Aama Saraswati Movies; FD Company; BK Films (Nepal); Bajgain Movies Pvt. Ltd. (International)
- Release date: 11 October 2019
- Running time: 145 minutes
- Country: Nepal
- Language: Nepali
- Budget: रू1.5 crore (US$97,000)
- Box office: est.रू9.4 crore (US$610,000) Crore - रू14 crore (US$910,000)

Chha Maya Chhapakkai (Nepali: छमाया छपक्कै) is a 2019 Nepali Social-comedy film directed by Dipendra Lama and produced by Rohit Adhikari of Rohit Adhikari Films. Writer of this film is Deepak Raj Giri. The film stars Deepak Raj Giri, Keki Adhikari, Kedar Ghimire and Jeetu Nepal. Actor Deepak Raj Giri even was awarded National Film Awards for the Best-actor

The film was formally announced in April 2019. The film was shot extensively across Nepal, The film's soundtrack and background score are composed by Basanta Thapa Choreographed by Kabi Raj, and Gahat Raj editing by Bipin Malla. Suman Giri is the film's production designer whilst Deepa Shree Niraula became the advisor of the director and screenplay by Deepak Raj Giri also Executive producers were Kedar Ghimire and Jeetu Nepal.

This film was made on a budget of रू 80-90 Lakh (US$73 thousand), The film was released theatrically on 11 October 2019 and opened to positive reviews from the critics with praise for the performances and screenplay. With रू 1.06 Crore (US$86 thousand) worldwide on its first day, The film grossed over रू 9.4 Crore (US$767 thousand) worldwide, making it the third highest-grossing Nepali film of 2019, and set several other box office records for a Nepali film, including the 11 highest-grossing Nepali of film.

== Cast ==
- Deepak Raj Giri as B.P. Poudel
- Keki Adhikari as Jaal Poudel; B.P's love interest
- Jeetu Nepal as Prabin
- Kedar Ghimire as Goli Kancha
- Supuspa Bhatta as Puja
- Prakash Ghimire as B.P's father/politician
- Ramadevi Thapaliya as B.P's mother
- Sarada Giri as Kali Budi; Goli Kancha's mother
- Sisir Bangdel Satwa as God father/politician
- Anurag Kuwar as Jaal's brother
- Sabin Bastola as Jaal's father/politician

Special Appearances:

- Barsha Raut as Goli Kancha's wife
- Buddhi Tamang in the song "Junko Juneli"
- Rajani Gurung in the song "Junko Juneli"

== Music ==
No.	Title	Lyrics	Music	Singer(s)	Length
1.	"Junko Juneli"	Rajendra Thapa	Basanta Thapa	Basanta Thapa; Meena Niraula	4:43
2.	"Chha Maya Chhappakkai X Bicha Bichama"	Durgesh Thapa	Durgesh Thapa	Durgesh Thapa; Team Chha Maya Chhapakkai	7:37

== See also ==
- List of highest-grossing Nepali films
- List of Nepalese films of 2019
