= Suman Karki =

Nepalese actor and comedian

- सुमन कार्की
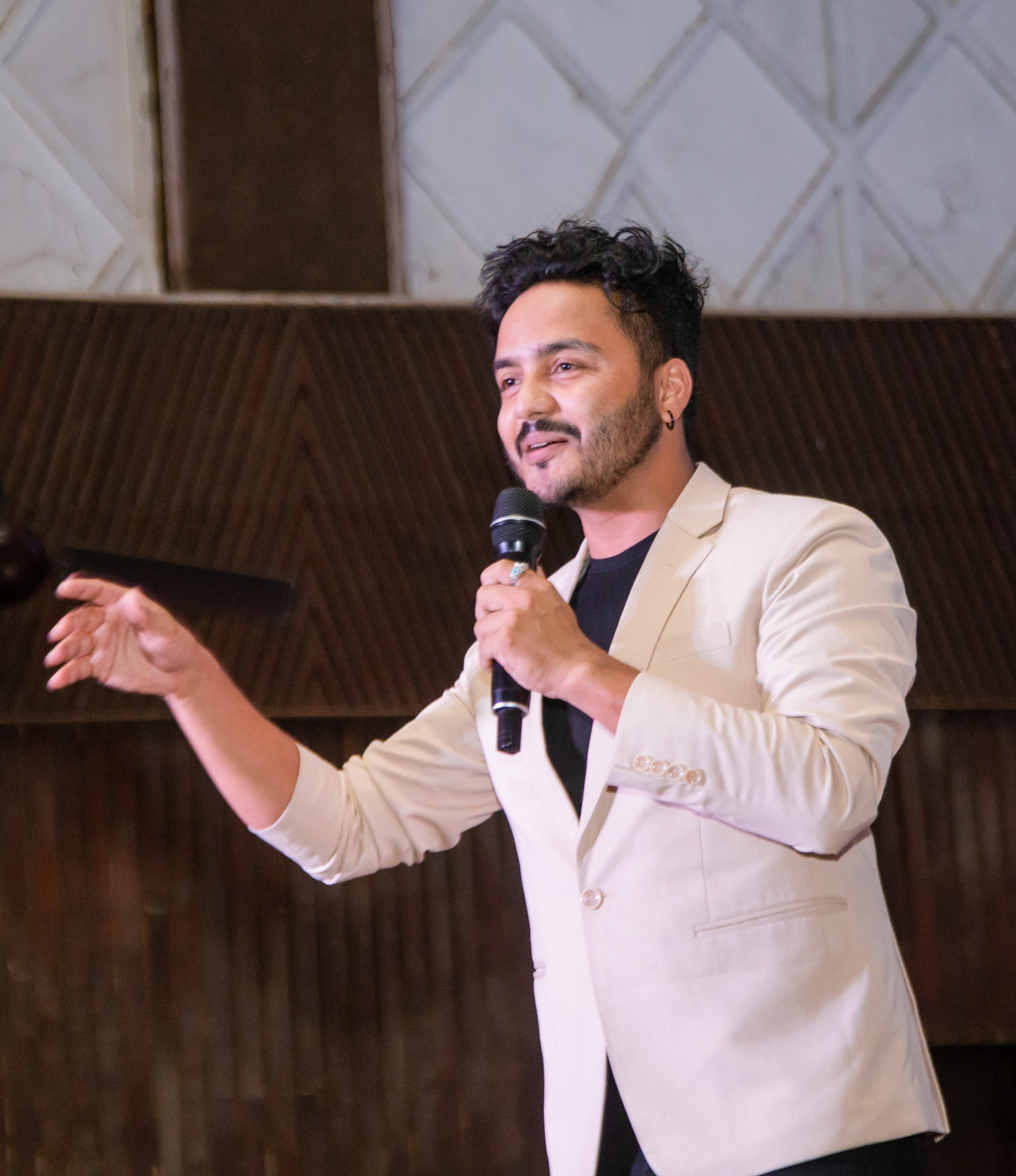
- Suman in 2023
- Born: December 21, 1995 (age 30); Okhaldhunga, Nepal
- Occupations: Actor; comedian; host
- Years active: 2012–present
- Known for: Comedy Club with Champions, Comedy Champion, Dancing with the Stars Nepal

Suman Karki (Nepali: सुमन कार्की ) was born on(December 21, 1995), is a Nepali actor and standup comedian from Okhaldhunga, Nepal known for his work in Nepalese cinema.

He is the top 5 contestant of Comedy Champion season 1. Comedian Suman Karki is popular from his caricature. He does the mimicry of famous comedians, actors, and politicians, etc.He started his career as a comedian in 2012. He was the host of reality show Dancing with the Stars Nepal. He also performs in comedy-reality show Comedy Club with Champions, which is broadcast on Nepal Television.

== Filmography ==
Credited as actor, unless otherwise noted.

Year	Film	Notes	Ref(s)
2021	Ma Ta Marchhu Ki Kya Ho		
2023	Dimag Kharab		
2024	Mahajatra		
