= Comedy Club with Champions =

Nepali stand-up comedy and talk show

- Opening screen of the show
- कमेडी क्लब विथ च्याम्पियन्स
- Genre: Comedy
- Written by: Pujan Adhikari; Sushant Basyal; Suman Koirala
- Directed by: Bishal Bhandari (until episode 26); Bkey Agarwal (episode 27 onwards)
- Creative director: Shan Basnyat
- Presented by: Bishal Bhandari
- Starring: Bishal Bhandari; Suman Karki; Sajan Shrestha; Kailash Karki; Mexam Gaudel; Pawan Bhattarai; Sundar Khanal; Usha Rajak
- Country of origin: Nepal
- Original language: Nepali
- No. of seasons: 1
- No. of episodes: 69

Production
- Executive producers: Usha Poudel Rijal; Rabindra Kumar Rijal "Sashi"
- Producer: Key Entertainment Pvt. Ltd.
- Production locations: Star Mall, Kathmandu
- Animator: Bibek Rijal
- Editor: Anil Shrestha
- Camera setup: Multi-camera
- Running time: 53-91 minutes
- Production companies: Key Advertising Service Pvt. Ltd. Key Entertainment Pvt. Ltd. Three Productions

Original release
- Network: Nepal Television
- Release: March 21, 2022 – July 10, 2023

Comedy Club with Champions is a Nepali stand-up comedy and talk show broadcast on Nepal Television and distributed by OSR Digital on YouTube. It is hosted by Bishal Bhandari; the first episode premiered on March 21, 2022. The first 26 episodes were directed by Bhandari himself; since then Bkey Agarwal took over as a director of the show. Deepa Shree Niraula has taken the role of permanent guest.

== Cast ==
- Bishal Bhandari as Himself (Host)
- Deepa Shree Niraula as Permanent guest
- Suman Karki as Various characters, mostly mimicry characters including Rishi Dhamala (mimic), Shivahari Poudel (mimic), and KP Sharma Oli (mimic)
- Sajan Shrestha as Solution Baba, Radhe, and other various characters
- Mexam Gaudel as Lover Keto, Shyam, Rabi Lamichhane (mimic), and other various characters
- Kailash Karki as Bhikari (beggar), and other various characters
- Pawan Bhattarai as Gaine Shree Shramlal Subedi a.k.a. Ganga Prasad Gaine, and other various characters
- Sundar Khanal as Pandit, Parajaya Kumar Pandey (mimicry of Vijay Kumar Pandey), Chiplaune Uncle (mimicry of Prakash Subedi), Madan Krishna Shrestha (mimic), Bhasme Don, Byapari (businessman)
- Santosh Thapa as Nepali Teacher, Hari Bansha Acharya (mimic), and other various characters
- Umesh Rai as Fulandeko Aama
- Usha Rajak as Various characters
- Suman Koirala as Dale Dai, Pushpa Kamal Dahal (mimic), and other various characters
- Bkey Agarwal as Host (first episode only)

== See also ==
Similar shows

- Comedy Champion
- Mundre Ko Comedy Club
