= Saroj Praja =

Nepalese dancer and actor

- सरोज प्रजा
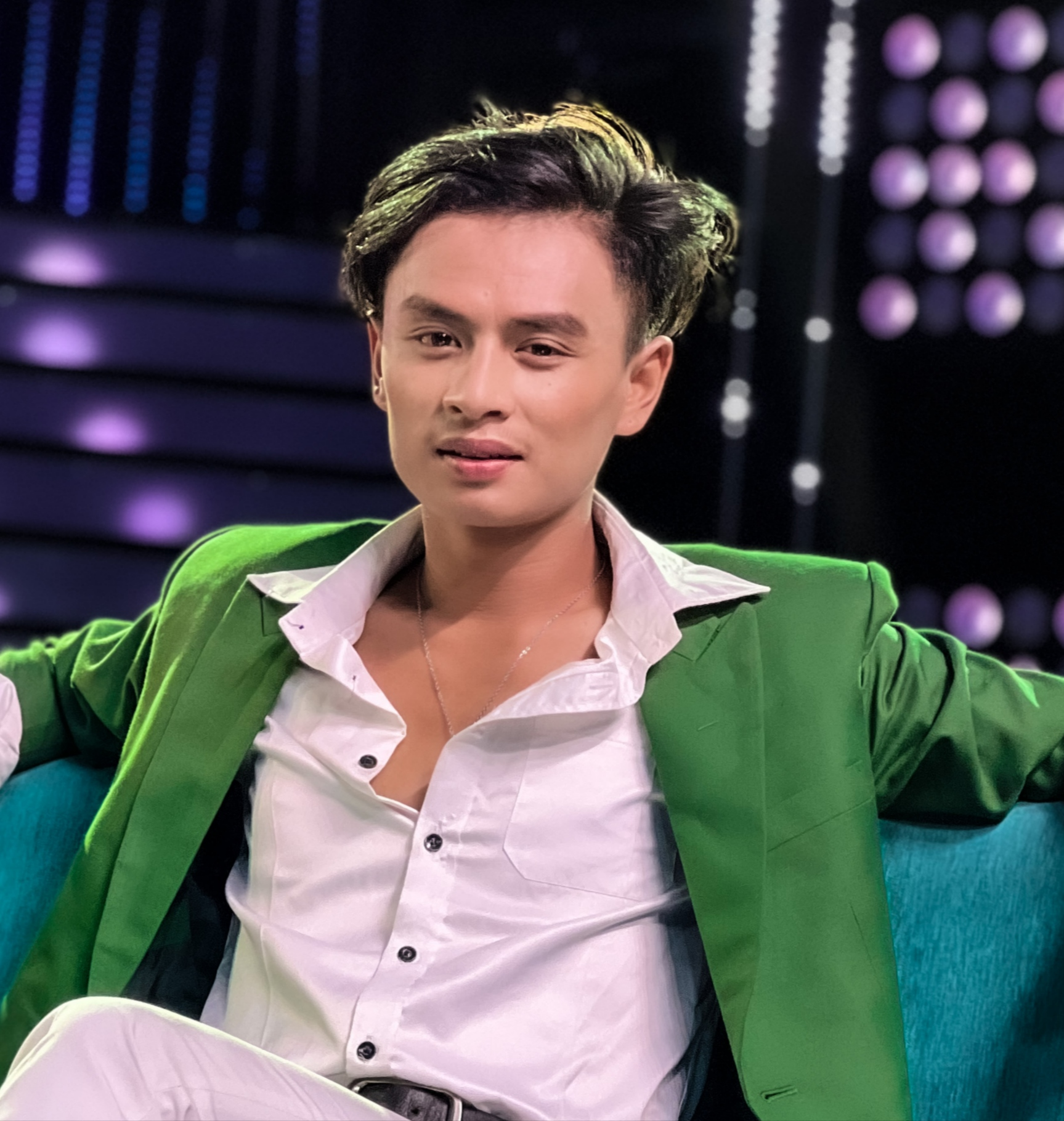
- Praja in the show Dancing with the Stars Nepal
- Born: November 14, 1995 (age 30); Manahari, Nepal
- Occupations: Dancer, actor
- Years active: 2016–present
- Parents: Chandralal Praja (father); Thulimaya Praja (mother)

Saroj Praja (Nepali: सरोज प्रजा; born November 14, 1995) is a Nepali actor and dancer known for his work in the Nepali dance and music industries. He is the winner of Rio Chhamchhami Season 3 and Dancing with the Stars Nepal. He featured in the music video Kura Katne Manchela Katun.

== Career ==
Saroj has released his first music video, Dukha Ra Kasta. Then he participated in the Nepal dance reality show Rio Chhamchhami Season 3 (2022), where he became the winner, which made him known to a wider audience. After that, he got many offers for music videos and movies. In 2023, he participated in another Nepali dance reality show, Dancing with the Stars Nepal, where he became the winner.

== Awards ==
Year	Ceremony	Category	Film/Song	Result	Ref(s)
2023	Captivating Creation Award			Won	
2023	Rapti Music Award			Won	
