= Khas Khus =

Nepali comedy program

- खास खुस
- Genre: Sitcom; Drama
- Created by: Kedar Ghimire; Wilson Bikram Rai
- Written by: Kedar Ghimire; Wilson Bikram Rai
- Screenplay by: Dipak Acharya; Yaman Shrestha
- Directed by: Kedar Ghimire; Wilson Bikram Rai; Sandesh Lamichane
- Starring: Kedar Ghimire; Wilson Bikram Rai
- Theme music composer: Yaman Shrestha
- Opening theme: "Yeta pani thikka"
- Ending theme: "Sunidai xa aaj kal"
- Composer: Yaman Shrestha
- Country of origin: Nepal
- Original language: Nepali
- No. of episodes: 62

Production
- Producer: Aama Agni Kumari Media
- Production locations: Kathmandu, Nepal
- Cinematography: Dilip Bista
- Editor: Rabindra Khadka
- Camera setup: Multiple camera
- Running time: 25-30 minutes

Original release
- Network: Nepal Television
- Release: 2015 – 2018

Khas Khus (Nepali: खास खुस) is a Nepali comedy web series which aired online on Aama Agni Kumari Media channel of YouTube. The lead actors of the show were played by the well-known Nepali comedians who were also writers and directors of this show, Kedar Ghimire and Wilson Bikram Rai. The show started on November 2, 2015, and the new episode of the show was uploaded every Thursday.

== Synopsis ==
It is the story of life in the village, and what the villagers do in their daily lives. Wilson Bikram Rai played as Takme Budo, the retired soldier who was awarded Victoria Cross (VC) in World War 2 while fighting against Japan; he is a very talkative man, and he always likes to tell people how he got his VC and what he did in the military. He mostly tells them fake stories which are always very funny. He also played another role, which was called Hakim Sab, the richest man in the village, who always like to say "hudaina, hudaina" which means "no, no". Even though he is rich, he is a miser old man who thinks a lot even when he has to spend very little amount of money. Kedar Ghimire played as Magne Budho, which is his all-time most popular role; he also played other various roles. All the other actors had their own unique and funny roles as well. Story provided a new moral message in every episode.

== Cast ==
- Kedar Ghimire as Magne Budho and Daanveer
- Wilson Bikram Rai as Takme Budo and Hakim Sab
- Sandesh Lamichane as Batare Kancho
- Sunita Gautam as Muiya
- Niru Khadka as Nirmali/Dambari
- Yaman Shrestha as Mana Maadsaab
- Sita Ghimire as Sita Didi
