= Kumar Basnet =

Nepalese folk singer (born 1938)

Lok Samrat Kumar Basnet
- कुमार बस्नेत
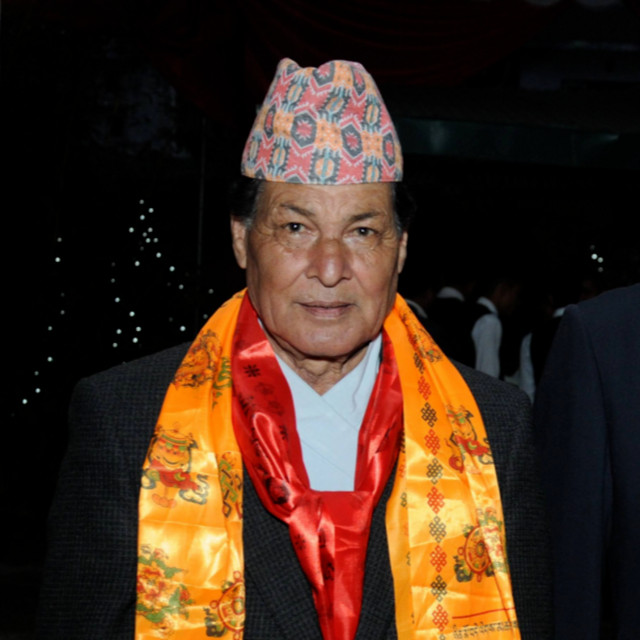
- Born: 7 July 1938 (age 88); Nepal
- Occupation: Singer
- Years active: 1960–Present
- Board member of: Pratilipi Adhikar Sanrakshyan Maanch, Sanskritik Sambardhan Parishad, Nepal Music Society, Nepal Film Board
- Spouse: Sharada Basnet
- Parents: Ganga Bahadur Basnet (father); Mankumari Basnet (mother)
- Awards: Tri-Shakti Patta - Third, Gorkha Dakshin Bahu - First, Birendra-Aishwarya Sewa Padak, Ratna Record Puraskar

Kumar Basnet (Nepali: कुमार बस्नेत) is a Nepalese folk singer, dancer and song writer. He started performing in his local village as early as 1957, he has been titled 'Nepalese Folk Legend' due to his successful singing career. Basnet, called the Elvis Presley of Nepal, is also popularly known by his comedy folk, satirical singing style, his major hit songs being Lai Bari Lai, Ama Bhanda and Herda Ramo.

Basnet's song Lai Bari Lai was featured in title song of highest grossing Nepalese film Chhakka Panja since the song matches what happens in the film.

== Discography ==
- Best Of Kumar Basnet
- Naya Koseli
- Madal Ghan – Ghan
- Kumar Dai
- Lok Koseli
