= Kiran KC =

Nepalese actor and comedian

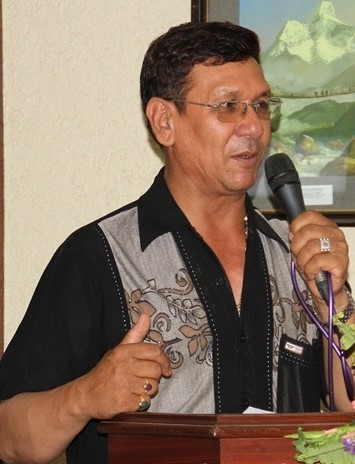
- Born: 28 June 1958 (age 67); Imadol, Lalitpur
- Other names: Rata Makai
- Occupations: Actor; comedian; singer
- Years active: 2003 - present
- Known for: Jire Khursani
- Spouse: Sita KC (m. 1975)
- Children: 3

Kiran KC (Nepali: किरण केसी) is a Nepalese actor and comedian. KC started as theatre artist along with Maha Jodi, from Rastriya Naach Ghar. He later became a television actor and became a prominent comedy actor in sitcoms such as Jire Khursani. KC was a producer on the feature film Shatru Gate.

== Career ==
Kiran was active in plays since his school time. In 1975, he started working in Rastriya Nach Ghar where he met his long time collaborator, Hari Bansha Acharya along with Sushila Raymajhi and Udit Narayan Jha. He has appeared in most of MaHa's works, hence he credits them for his achievements. He became popular after appearing in 2003 sitcom Jire Khursani, where his catchphrase was "Ye Rata Makai (ए राता मकै)" which means "Oh! red maize!".

== Filmography ==
KC has acted in several telefilms and about 50 feature films.

Year	Film	Role	Notes	Ref.
2019	Race			
2019	Dal Bhat Tarkari			
2018	Chhakka Panja 3			
2018	Shatru Gate			
2017	Chhakka Panja 2			
2012	Sathi Ma Timro			
2001	Je Bho Ramrai Bho		Producer	
2000	Ta Ta Saarai Nai Bigris Badri		Producer	

=== Television ===
Year	Title	Role	Notes	Ref.
1989	Pandhra Gate	Kallu		
	Dashain	Patrakar bhanja		
	Chiranjibi	Narayan		
	Raat	Champa's brother		
1995	Laalpurja	Taxi	asst. director	
	Oh-ho...!	Dr. Rajnitik Prasad		
	Wrong Number	Karate practitioner		
	Kantipur	Yamadut		
	Ashal Logne	Witch doctor	Guest appearance	
	MaHa Chautari			
	Madan Bahadur Hari Bahadur			
	Bose Andrei Bhudiko			
	Gold Medal	Shopkeeper		
2003-2015	Jire Khursani	Rata Makai		
2016-2018	Brake Fail	Asta Narayan "Hakucha"	also director	

== Discography ==
Year	Album	Co-singer	Notes	Ref.
	Ye Raata Makai		5 songs	
	Dharo Dharma Maili		5 songs	
	Sanchai Hununchha			

== Awards ==
- National Film Awards 2005 (2062 BS) - Best Comedy Actor for Meri Aama
- Gorakha Dakshin Bahu 4th (2062 BS)
