= Kailash Karki =

Nepali stand-up comedian (born 1999 or 2000)

- कैलाश कार्की
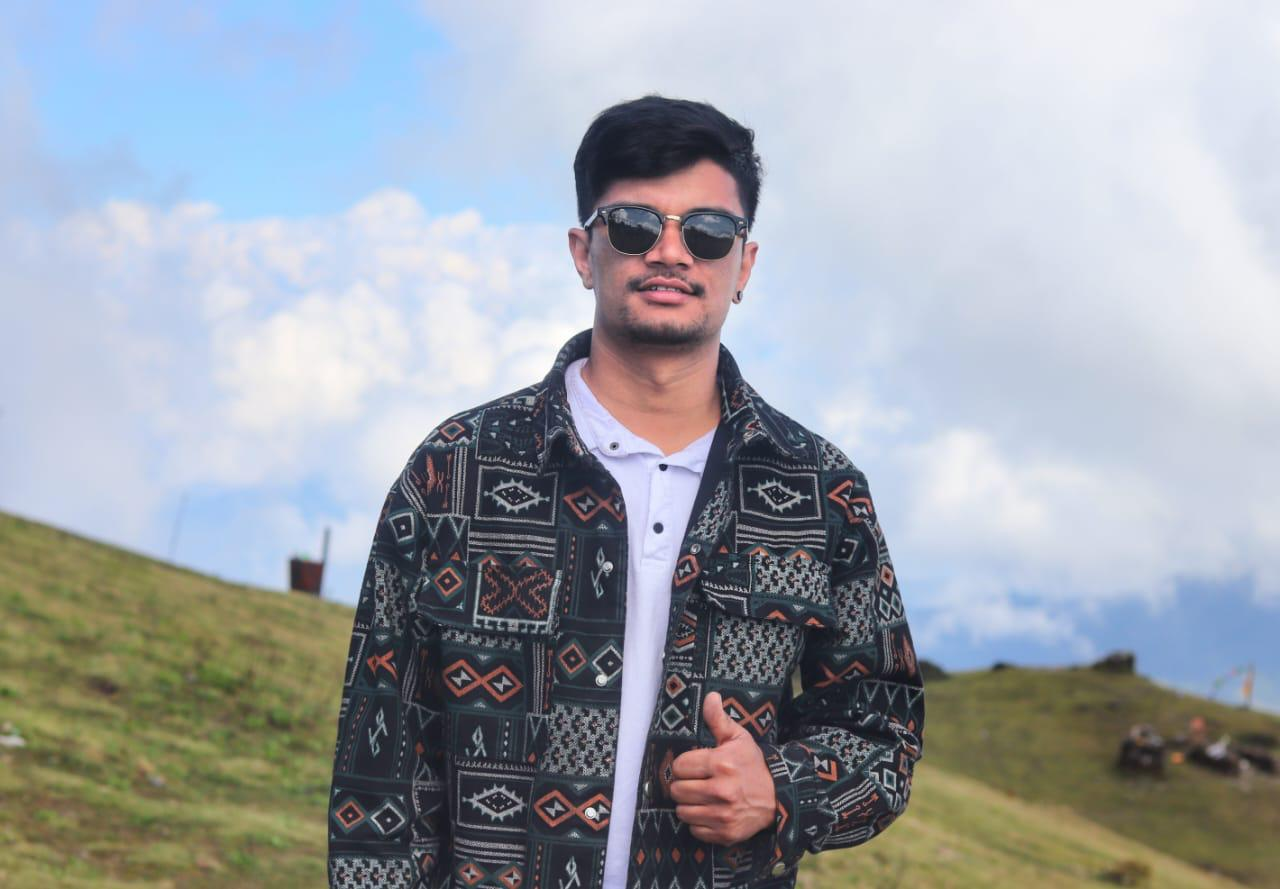
- Born: Solukhumbu, Nepal
- Occupations: Comedian, artist, actor
- Years active: 2018–present
- Website

Kailash Kari (Nepali: कैलाश कार्की) is a Nepali stand-up comedian. He was born in 2056 BS (1999–2000) in Solukhumbu, Nepal. He started his comedy journey on the reality show Comedy Champion. He participated in two seasons of Comedy Champion as a competitor. In the first season, he reached the top 15, and in the second season, he reached the top 6. Currently, he performs on the television program Comedy Club with Champions, which is broadcast by Nepal Television.
