= Chhakka Panja 2 =

Nepalese comedy-drama film

- Nepali: छक्का पन्जा २
- Directed by: Deepa Shree Niraula
- Screenplay by: Deepak Raj Giri
- Story by: Bikash Raj Acharya; Samipya Raj Timalsina
- Produced by: Kedar Ghimire; Jeetu Nepal; Tara Chandra Bajgain; Dipendra Khaniya; Keshav Neupane; Suman Giri
- Starring: Deepak Raj Giri; Kedar Ghimire; Priyanka Karki; Jeetu Nepal; Barsha Raut; Buddhi Tamang; Swastima Khadka; Prem Pandey; Swaroop Purush Dhakal
- Cinematography: Dirgha Gurung
- Edited by: Bipin Malla
- Production companies: Aama Saraswati Movies; IME Group
- Release date: 27 August 2017 (Nepal)
- Running time: 135 minutes
- Country: Nepal
- Language: Nepali
- Budget: est.रू1.50 crore
- Box office: est.रू14.51 crore

Chhakka Panja 2 (Nepali: छक्का पन्जा २), also abbreviated and known as CP2 or C:P 2, is a 2017 Nepalese comedy-drama film directed by Deepa Shree Niraula, with a story written by Bikash Raj Acharya and Samipya Raj Timalsina and a screenplay written by Deepak Raj Giri. It was produced by Kedar Ghimire, Jeetu Nepal, Tara Chandra Bajgain, Dipendra Khaniya, Keshav Neupane, and Suman Giri under the banner of Aama Sarswoti Movies. It is the second film in the Chhakka Panja series. The film stars Deepak Raj Giri, Kedar Ghimire, Buddhi Tamang Priyanka Karki, Swastima Khadka, debutant Swaroop Purush Dhakal and Barsha Raut in the lead roles.

Chhakka Panja 2 first premiered around Nepal's big cities and then was released worldwide. It is the second highest grossing Nepali film of all-time after its prequel, Chhakka Panja.

== Cast ==
- Deepak Raj Giri as Raja
- Priyanka Karki as Uma
- Ayushman Joshi as Aakash
- Swastima Khadka as Akansha
- Shivahari Poudel as Prabhu
- Jeetu Nepal as Saraswati
- Kedar Ghimire as Consultancy mama/Magne Mama
- Buddhi Tamang as Buddhi
- Barsha Raut as Brinda
- Swaroop Dhakal as Prajwol
- Gaurav Pahari as Gaurav
- Jayananda Lama as Jayananda

== Plot ==
In a village, there are three friends: Prajwol (Swaroop Dhakal), Saraswati (Jeetu Nepal) and Gaurav (Gaurav Pahari) but Gaurav who recently came from United States and who came to the village to get married goes back to the USA. After Gaurav leaves the village, Prajwol and Saraswati both decide to go to Kathmandu. Saraswati has to prepare for his Lok Sewa (Public Service) exam while his friend Prajwol is following his dream of going to Australia.

Two young girls Akansha (Swastima Khadka) and Brinda (Barsha Raut) are enjoying their life in Kathmandu. Both of them are students who're struggling with their IELTS exams they have to do this exam to enterAustralia. Uma (Priyanka Karki) is strict mom of Akansha and a well-known lawyer and she is dealing with all of her daughter Akansha's shenanigans. Seeing no other options, Akansha goes to her uncle Magne Budo (Kedar Ghimire) who works in Visa company. There Magne offers Akansha a plant to marry (fake) with Prajwol. After proving their marriage, both of them will enter Australia in a dependent visa. But their plans fail and they are unable to go to Australia. Prajwol slowly starts liking Aakansha but she tells him the story of Aakash (Aayushman Joshi). Aakash is Aakansha's real boyfriend who lives in Australia. Aakansha reveals that Aakash himself had gone to Australia on a dependent visa after doing a fake 'paper marriage' with Priya who has higher score in the exam.

Everything goes well until the introduction of Raja (Deepak Raj Giri), Uma's boyfriend when she was young. Uma thinks that he had betrayed her. Raja is a DSP now. With the help of him, Uma catches Prajwol and Aakansha. That results into Aakansha leaving home. Aakansha tries for a Visa but fails again. Meanwhile, Aakash returns from Australia and finds out that the Visa had failed due to incomplete document submission by Prajwol. Prajwol is depressed due to his breakup. Aakansha and Aakash try to marry but they are caught by Raja. All of them are arrested in case of Polygamy and sent to court.

Then the story takes a turn. While the case is going on, Priya enters the court and accuses Aakash of Polygamy. She demands Aakash 30 million NRs, to sign the divorce papers, which Aakash gives. Then it is revealed that Priya is actually Prajwol's girlfriend. It was all their plan to get 30 million. They get caught but the police couldn't do anything because they had not broken the law. Gaurav returns to Nepal after his father's death. Aakash and Aakansha are married and are living their life happily. So are Prajwol and Priya.

== Soundtrack ==
| No. | Title | Singer(s) | Length |
|---|---|---|---|
| 1. | "Sara Ra Ra Hui" | Deepa Shree Niraula, Jeetu Nepal, Kedar Ghimire, Tanka Budhathoki | 1:01 |
| 2. | "Mata Yeta Kinarama (Jhyamma Jhyamma)" | Hari Bansha Acharya, Astha Raut | 5:01 |
| 3. | "Ye Daju Nasamau" | Almoda Rana Uprety, Sujata Verma | 4:14 |

Chhakka Panja 2

Soundtrack album by Almoda Rana Uprety
- Released: 27 August 2017
- Genre: Film soundtrack
- Length: 10:16
- Label: HighlightsNepal
- Producer: Deepak Raj Giri

Almoda Rana Uprety chronology
| Chhakka Panja | Chhakka Panja 2 | Woda Number 6 |

=== Music controversy ===
"Ye Daju Nasamau" was accused of being stolen from Nepalese folk singer Kancha Magar Nepali. Then the director and producer Deepak Raj Giri gave credit to the original singer and apologised to the singer and his fans. Then another song of Chhakka Panja 2, "Mata Yeta Kinarama" (Jhyamma Jhyamma) was also accused of being stolen from Nepalese film Dewar Babu 's song "Basna Mittho Kasturi Ko".

== Reception ==
=== Box office ===
Ekantipur reported that Chhakka Panja 2 earned Rs. 60 million in the six days. The film became the highest-grossing film in Nepal of the year breaking record of Prem Geet 2 within 8 days. Its newest box office estimate is Rs. 13 crore.
