= Dancing with the Stars Nepal =

Nepalese reality television series

- Genre: Reality television
- Created by: Fenia Vardanis Richard Hopkins Karen Smith
- Based on: Strictly Come Dancing
- Directed by: Laxman Paudyal
- Presented by: Suman Karki; Sadichha Shrestha
- Country of origin: Nepal
- Original language: Nepali
- No. of seasons: 1
- No. of episodes: 26

Production
- Running time: 90 minutes

Original release
- Network: Himalaya Television
- Release: 18 September 2020

Dancing with the Stars Nepal
- Judges: Gauri Malla; Dilip Rayamajhi; Renasha Bantawa Rai

Release
- Original network: Himalaya Television

Dancing with the Stars, Nepal is a celebrity dance reality show licensed by BBC Studios based on the format of the British reality TV competition Strictly Come Dancing and is part of the Dancing with the Stars franchise. The show is produced by ANC Production, production house which have produced The Voice of Nepal. The show is directed by Laxman Poudyal, director of The Voice of Nepal, The Voice Kids and Nepal Idol Season 1. For the first season 12 celebrity and choreographers will compete to win the title. Second season of Dancing Stars Nepal has already been announced and will air on TV very soon.

== Format ==
The format of the show consists of a celebrity paired with a professional dancer. Each couple performs predetermined dances and competes against the others for judges' points and audience votes. In Nepal, audience can vote from IME Pay App.

== Cast ==
=== Host ===
For the first season, show makers announced that participant of Nepal's first comedy reality show - Comedy Champion top 5 participant, Suman Karki and Miss Nepal World 2010, Sadichha Shrestha will be hosting this season.

=== Judges ===
Actress/dancer Gauri Malla, actor/dancer Dilip Rayamajhi and film director, producer & choreographer Renasha Bantawa Rai will be judging the show.

== Season 1 ==
=== Participants ===
Couple No	Professional Dancer	Known For	Celebrity	Known For
1.	Yumi Balami	Founder/Choreographer NYFAM	Hari Khadka	Former Captain of National Football Team, Nepal
2.	Rajiv Kumar Karn	Film Choreographer	Puja Thakur	Actress
3.	Swoyatna Yonjan	Host Jhankar Live	Prashant Tamrakar	Fashion Coach
4.	Pramod Kumar Bhandari	Film Choreographer	Umesh Rai	Comedian
5.	Sanjaya Lama	Choreographer	Divanshi Baidawar	Child Actress
6.	Laure Singh	Professional Dancer	Jyoti Magar	Singer
7.	Viju Parki	Choreographer	Sumi Moktan	Actress
8.	Kebika Khatri	Finalist ChamChami Season 3	Buddha Lama	Winner of Nepal Idol Season 1
9.	Sunil BK	Founder/Choreographer Nepholic Crew	Deepa-Damanta	Tiktok Twins
10.	Saroj Moktan	Finalist Boogie Woogie	Rakshya Shrestha	Actress
11.	Keshav Thapa	Choreographer	Shristi KC	Dancer/Actress with special Ability
12.	Shubham Bhujel	Top 9 participant Boogie Woogie Nepal/ Choreographer	Priyana Acharya	Television Actress

For the first season, there would be 11 couples competing for the title.

=== Celebrity Guests ===
Guests	Episode No.	Episode Date	Note
Rajesh Hamal	Grand Premiere	18 September 2020	
Basundhara Bhusal	Episode 03	2 October 2020	
Basundhara Bhusal	Episode 04	3 October 2020	
Ramesh Upreti	Episode 05	9 October 2020	
Rajendra Khadgi	Episode 06	10 October 2020	
Krishna Malla & Sharmila Malla	Episode 07	16 October 2020	
Kiran KC	Episode 08	17 October 2020	
Bhuwan Chand & Chaite Devi sing	Episode 09	23 October 2020	
Namrata Shrestha	Episode 10	24 October 2020	
Pal Shah & Najir Hussain	Episode 13	6 November 2020	
Pal Shah & Najir Hussain	Episode 14	7 November 2020	
Bhuwan KC	Episode 23	11 December 2020	
Nischal Basnet & Swastima Khadka	Episode 24	12 December 2020	

=== Scoring Chart ===
Couple	Team	Week 1	Week 2	Week 3	Week 4	Week 5	Week 6	Week 7	Week 8	Week 9		Week 10		Week 11		Week 12		Week 13
Sumi & Viju	Suviju	30	30	30	26	23	23	27	27	27	26	29	30	29	30	30	30	Winner
Buddha & Kevika	Buddhika	26	26	26	26	26	26	28	26	27	30	24	30	29	30	29	30	1st Runner up
Priyana & Subham	Priyam					24	22	26	22	25	25	27	27	26	24	30	27	2nd Runner up
Aama & Pramod	Amod	26	25	29	25	28	27	25	29	23	26	25	29	29	25	30	27	Eliminated
Jyoti & Laure	Jotila	30	25	27	23	25	25	27	26	25	28	27	26	25	30	Eliminated		
Divanshi & Siddhart	Devarth	27	26	24	30	26	21	30	27	23	27	30	26	Eliminated				
Prashant & Swantyona	Prayatna	30	20	27	24	26	23	28	23	23	24	Eliminated						
Shristi & Keshav	Shrisav	29	27	30	26	26	23	30	27	Eliminated								
Deepa & Damanta	Sudeemanta	24	26	29	28	27	24	29	26	Eliminated								
Hari & Yumi	Haami	26	24	25	26	26	22	Eliminated										
Puja & Rajiv	Purajiv (Puroj)	24	24	23	27	Eliminated												
Rakshya & Saroj	Rakroj	22	27	Eliminated														
Bottom 3			Buddhika, Amod, Suviju		Puroj, Hami, Prayatna		Prayatna; Haami; Priyam		Shrisav; Jotila; Sudeemanta	Devarth; Prayatna; Jotila		Amod; Devarth; Buddhika		Jotila; Buddhika; Suviju		Buddhika Amod Priyam		
Evicted			Rakroj		Puroj		Haami		Shrisav; Sudeemanta	Prayatna		Devarth		Jotila		Amod		

- Rakshya was injured while practising dance so due to health condition doctor advice to take at least 2 months bed rest Rakshya & Saroj Team Rakroj quit the show. However Saroj dance beat appreciated by all judges and there are not in bottom three in week 2
- Puja Thakurs choreographer change Saroj team name is Puroj in week 4
- Priyana Acharya and Saroj wild card entry in week 5

Green numbers indicate the highest score for each week
Red numbers indicate the lowest score for each week
indicates profomance of the week.
the couple eliminated that week
the returning couple that was in the bottom two
the couple withdrew from the competition
the couple won immunity and did not dance off
the winning couple
the runner-up couple
the third place couple

== Season 2 ==
Soon, Season 2 of Dancing with the stars will be aired on Himalaya TV HD . The star participants and choreographer will be announced soon .

=== Participants ===
Couple No	Professional Dancer	Known For	Celebrity	Known For
1.	JD Tamu	Renowned Choreographer	Paramita RL Rana	Actress
2.	Anuja Agrawal	Choreographer	Dhiraj Rai	Singer
3.	Dilip Okheda	Choreographer	Sonica Rokaya	Youtube Content Creator
4.	Swoyatna Yonjan	Host Jhankar Live	Pardeep Bastola	Actor
5.	Sunita Darnal	Choreographer	Dr. Santosh Upadhyaya/Santosh upadhyaya	Mr. Nepal 2019/Politician/Doctor
6.	Sunil B.K	Founder/Choreographer Nepholic Crew	Bhagwati Khadka	First Women Wrestler of Nepal
7.	Kebika Khatri	Finalist Chamchami Season 3	Amar & Amrit Dahal	Tiktok Twins
8.	Ravi Patel	Choreographer	Neelam Dhungana	One Leg Dancer
9.	Laure Singh	Professional Dancer	Kajal Karn	Heart of Maithili Cinemas
10.	Saroj Rana Praja	Professional Dancer	Chhiring Sherpa	First Sherpa Actress
11.	Sanjay Lama	Choreographer	Samaira Shrestha	Theatre Artist / Voice of LGBTQ
12.	Shekhar Gharti Magar	Choreographer	Preeti Ale	Singer

=== Scoring Chart ===
Couple	Team	Week 1	Week 2	Week 3	Week 4	Week 5	Week 6	Week 7	Week 8	Week 9		Week 10		Week 11		Week 12		Week 13
Sumi & Viju	Suviju	30	30	30	26	23	23	27	27	27	26	29	30	29	30	30	30	Winner
Buddha & Kevika	Buddhika	26	26	26	26	26	26	28	26	27	30	24	30	29	30	29	30	1st Runner up
Priyana & Subham	Priyam					24	22	26	22	25	25	27	27	26	24	30	27	2nd Runner up
Aama & Pramod	Amod	26	25	29	25	28	27	25	29	23	26	25	29	29	25	30	27	Eliminated
Jyoti & Laure	Jotila	30	25	27	23	25	25	27	26	25	28	27	26	25	30	Eliminated		
Divanshi & Siddhart	Devarth	27	26	24	30	26	21	30	27	23	27	30	26	Eliminated				
Prashant & Swantyona	Prayatna	30	20	27	24	26	23	28	23	23	24	Eliminated						
Shristi & Keshav	Shrisav	29	27	30	26	26	23	30	27	Eliminated								
Deepa & Damanta	Sudeemanta	24	26	29	28	27	24	29	26	Eliminated								
Hari & Yumi	Haami	26	24	25	26	26	22	Eliminated										
Puja & Rajiv	Purajiv (Puroj)	24	24	23	27	Eliminated												
Kajal & Laure	Rakroj	22	27	Eliminated														
Bottom 3			Buddhika, Amod, Suviju		Puroj, Hami, Prayatna		Prayatna; Haami; Priyam		Shrisav; Jotila; Sudeemanta	Devarth; Prayatna; Jotila		Amod; Devarth; Buddhika		Jotila; Buddhika; Suviju		Buddhika Amod Priyam		
Evicted			Rakroj		Puroj		Haami		Shrisav; Sudeemanta	Prayatna		Devarth		Jotila		Amod		

- Rakshya was injured while practicing dance so due to health condition with doctor advice to take at least 2 months bed rest. Rakshya & Saroj Team Rakroj quit the show. However Saroj dance beat was appreciated by all judges and there are not in bottom three in week 2
- Puja Thakurs choreographer change Saroj team name is Puroj in week 4
- Priyana Acharya and Saroj wild card entry in week 5

Green numbers indicate the highest score for each week
Red numbers indicate the lowest score for each week
indicates profomance of the week.
the couple eliminated that week
the returning couple that was in the bottom two
the couple withdrew from the competition
the couple won immunity and did not dance off
the winning couple
the runner-up couple
the third place couple
