= Chhakka Panja 3 =

Nepalese film directed by Deepa Shree Niraula

- Film poster
- Nepali: छक्का पन्जा ३
- Directed by: Deepa Shree Niraula
- Written by: Deepak Raj Giri; Kedar Ghimire; Jeetu Nepal; Yaman Shrestha
- Produced by: Deepa Shree Niraula; Deepak Raj Giri; Kedar Ghimire; Jeetu Nepal
- Starring: Deepak Raj Giri; Kedar Ghimire; Jeetu Nepal; Deepika Prasain; Buddhi Tamang
- Cinematography: Purshottam Pradhan
- Edited by: Bipin Malla
- Production companies: Aama Saraswati Movies; IME Group
- Release date: 1 October 2018
- Running time: 145 minutes
- Country: Nepal
- Language: Nepali
- Budget: रु 2 Crore
- Box office: रु 20.3 Crores

Chhakka Panja 3 (Nepali: छक्का पन्जा ३) is a Nepalese comedy film from 2018, directed by Deepa Shree Niraula, and produced by Deepa Shree Niraula, Deepak Raj Giri, Kedar Ghimire and Jeetu Nepal for Aama Sarswoti Movies. It is the third film of the Chhakka Panja series. The film tells the story of the daughter of a headmaster (played by Deepika Prasai) and famous news reporter who marries the rich and illiterate Raja, the son of a big politician of her village and tries to improve conditions at a government school but faces hurdles in her goal. The film met with positive response from critics and audience for its story, script, social message, comedy and performance of the cast especially of Kedar Ghimire. The film was a massive blockbuster at the box office breaking several and exceeding its predecessor Chhakka Panja to become the highest-grossing film in Nepal until Kabaddi 4: The Final Match surpassed it. The 4th Part of the series was announced in July 2022 with new cast with only Deepak Raj Giri, Kedar Ghimire, Deepa Shree Niraula and releases in 2024 on occasion if Dashain.

== Cast ==
- Deepika Prasai as Raja's wife
- Deepak Raj Giri as Raja Kaji
- Jeetu Nepal as Thaneshwor
- Kedar Ghimire as Magne Budo
- Buddhi Tamang as Buddhi
- Shivahari Paudel as School headmaster
- Neer Shah as Kaji
- Kiran K.C. as Pandit
- Basanta Bhatta as Syan Kaji
- Anurag Kunwar as Syan Kaji's son
- Laxmi Giri as Raja's mother
- Sharada Giri as Kali Budi
- Aahana Pokhrel as Kamali
- Wilson Bikram Rai as English teacher
- Swastima Khadka as Buddhi's girlfriend (special appearance)
- Priyanka Karki as Rinku TV presenter (special appearance)
- Barsha Raut as Brinda (special appearance in the song "Pahilo number ma")

== Synopsis ==
A headmaster's daughter tries to improve conditions at her father's government school.

== Music ==
No.	Title	Lyrics	Music	Singer(s)	Length
1.	"Pahilo Number Maa"	Rajendra Thapa	Dipak Sharma	David Shankar, Bindu Pariyar	4:41
2.	"Pachhi Umer Dhalkinchha"	Arjun Pokharel, Deepak Raj Giri	Arjun Pokharel	Nishan Bhattarai, Angila Regmi	4:00
3.	"Ghatasthapana Ko Din"	Kedar Ghimire	Dipak Sharma	David Shankar, Deepak Raj Giri, Deepa Shree Niraula, Kedar Ghimire, Jeetu Nepal	1:21
