= Deepak Raj Giri =

Nepalese comedian, actor and director

- दिपकराज गिरि
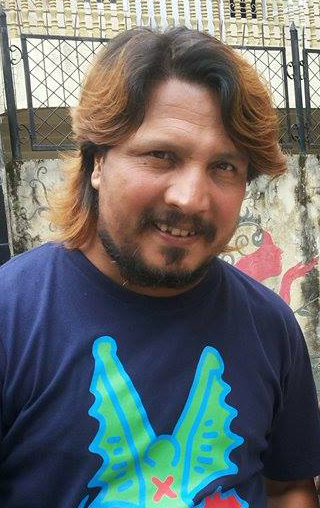
- Giri in 2015
- Born: 13 April 1975 (age 51); Dahachok, Nepal
- Occupations: Comedian; actor; screenwriter; director; producer
- Years active: 1995–present
- Notable work: Tito Satya (2003–2015), Chhakka Panja (2016)

Deepak Raj Giri (Nepali: दिपकराज गिरि) is a Nepalese actor, comedian, screenwriter, director, and producer known for his lead role in hugely popular Nepali satire sitcom Tito Satya and highest grossing film series in Nepal, Chakka Panja series. He is one of the most successful and is the highest-grossing actor of Nepali cinema with his films grossing a total of NPR 100cr+ in lifetime..

== Early life ==
Deepak Raj Giri was born in April 13th, 1975 Dahachok, which is located in Kathmandu District.

== Career ==
Giri wrote, directed, and acted in the iconic Nepali sitcom Tito Satya, which ran for 12 years from 2003 to 2015.

Giri had appeared in many films prior, but he first made an appearance in the lead role in 2008 with Sundar Mero Naam, where his performance was critically acclaimed. But the film failed to succeed at the box office.

In 2014, Giri wrote, produced, and played a lead role in Chha Ekan Chha, which was commercially successful. In 2015, he wrote, produced, and starred in Woda Number 6, which was also commercially successful.

In 2016, he produced and wrote Chhakka Panja, in which he also played one of the lead roles. The film was followed up by the sequels Chhakka Panja 2 in 2017, and Chhakka Panja 3 in 2018. Giri received two NEFTA awards, for "best story and screenplay", for his work on Chhakka Panja 3. The Chhakka Panja franchise is the most commercially successful in Nepali cinema.

In 2018, Giri appeared in Maha Jodi's Shatru Gate, which he also produced. The film became a blockbuster at the box office.

In 2019, Giri wrote, produced, and starred in Chha Maya Chhapakkai, for which he won the National Film Award in the "best actor" category.

Giri hosted the television show Crime Patrol Nepal in 2022, which only lasted seven episodes.

In 2023, he wrote and starred in Chhakka Panja 4, which made more than 16.9 crore and became a blockbuster at the box office.

In 2024, he wrote and starred in Chhakka Panja 5, which was released in Dashain. The film had the biggest opening of 2024 in Nepal, making around 1.5 crore in its first day, and around 11.5 crore in first 6 days nationwide.

== Filmography ==
=== Films ===
Key
†	Denotes films that have not yet been released

Year	Title	Role	Credited as			Director	Ref(s)
Year	Title	Role	Actor	Writer	Producer	Director	Ref(s)
1995	Jali Rumal		Yes	No	No	Anish Koirala	
1998	Chor	Raghu	Yes	No	No	Rajkumar Sharma	
2002	Bishwas	Prem	Yes	No	No	Ujwal Ghimire	
2002	Santaan Thari Tharika	Prabhu	Yes	No	No	Deshbhakta Khanal	
2003	Thule		Yes	No	No	Surendra Shah	
2003	Jiwandan		Yes	No	No	Ashok Shrestha	
2007	Nepal		Yes	No	No	Dayaram Dahal	
2008	Sundar Mero Naam	Sundar	Yes	No	No	Vijaya Thapa	
2009	Sangharsha Jindagiko		Yes	No	No	Vindo Sereng	
2014	Chha Ekan Chha	Chanchal Pandey	Yes	Yes	Yes	Dinesh D.C.	
2015	Woda Number 6	Deep Kumar Sharma	Yes	Yes	Yes	Ujjwal Ghimire	
2016	Chhakka Panja	Raja	Yes	Yes	Yes	Deepa Shree Niraula	
2017	Chhakka Panja 2	Raja / DSP B.S Kunwar	Yes	Screenplay	No	Deepa Shree Niraula	
2018	Shatru Gate	Rahul KC	Yes	Screenplay	Yes	Pradip Bhattarai	
2018	Chhakka Panja 3	Raja Kaji	Yes	Yes	No	Deepa Shree Niraula	
2019	Chha Maya Chhapakkai	B.P. Poudel	Yes	Yes	Yes	Dipendra Lama	
2023	Chhakka Panja 4	Raja	Yes	Yes	No	Hem Raj BC	
2024	Chhakka Panja 5	Prithivi Bikram / Raja	Yes	Yes	No	Deepa Shree Niraula	

=== Television ===
Year	Title	Role	Notes	Seasons
2003 - 2015	Tito Satya	Deepak	Also writer and director.	09
2022	Crime Patrol Nepal	Himself (Host)		01

== Awards ==
NEFTA Film Awards
Year	Award	Film	Result	Ref(s)
2014	Best Dialogue	Chha Ekan Chha	Won	
2021	Best Story	Chhakka Panja 3	Won	
2021	Best Screenplay	Chhakka Panja 3	Won	
2021	Best Dialogue	Chhakka Panja 3	Nominated	

National Film Awards
Year	Award	Film	Result	Ref(s)
2022	Best Actor	Chha Maya Chhapakkai	Won	
