= Chhakka Panja =

- Theatrical poster
- Nepali: छक्का पञ्जा
- Directed by: Deepa Shree Niraula
- Written by: Deepak Raj Giri; Kedar Ghimire; Jitu Nepal
- Screenplay by: Deepak Raj Giri
- Produced by: Deepak Raj Giri; Deepa Shree Niraula; Kedar Ghimire; Jeetu Nepal
- Starring: Priyanka Karki; Pragya Aryal; Deepak Raj Giri; Kedar Ghimire; Shivahari Poudel; Barsha Raut; Aaryan Sigdel
- Cinematography: Purshottam Pradhan
- Edited by: Bipin Malla
- Music by: Rajan Raj Shiwakoti; Deepak Sharma
- Production companies: Aama Saraswati Movies; IME Group
- Distributed by: HighlightsNepal
- Release date: 9 September 2016 (Nepal)
- Running time: 139 minutes
- Country: Nepal
- Language: Nepali language
- Budget: रू0.85 crore
- Box office: रू16.10 crore

Chhakka Panja (Nepali: छक्का पञ्जा) (transl. Six, Five) is a 2016 Nepalese comedy-drama film directed and produced by Deepa Shree Niraula in her directorial debut. The film features an ensemble cast of Priyanka Karki, Deepak Raj Giri, Jeetu Nepal, Kedar Ghimire, Buddhi Tamang, Shivahari Poudel, Barsha Raut and Namrata Sapkota. The film is first part of Chakka Panja series and tells the story of Raja (Giri), a rich but illiterate man and his group of friends, Ateet (Poudel), Saraswati (Nepal), Magne (Ghimire) and Buddhi (Tamang). Raja, who is devoted to the chase, gives in to family pressure and gets married, but different events unfolds in his and his friends' life that gives rise to a comedy of errors and situations. The film received highly positive reviews for its screenplay and story, performances, humour and its social setting and message. The film was an "All Time Blockbuster" at the box office, breaking several records and becoming the highest grossing Nepali film of all time, until it was overtaken by its 3rd part. However, due to piracy problems, the movie was released on YouTube. Due to the piracy, the international screening of the movie was highly affected. The film has four sequels:- Chhakka Panja 2, Chhakka Panja 3, Chhakka Panja 4 and Chhakka Panja 5, all of which were commercial blockbusters and is the highest grossing Nepali movie franchise.

Chakka Panja is considered as one of the best Nepali films ever made and one of the finest comedy films of all time made in South Asia noted for its humorous dialogues blended with social message.

== Plot ==
Raja (Deepak Raj Giri) is a rich but illiterate man enjoying his life with his friends Ateet (Shivahari Poudel), Saraswati (Jeetu Nepal), Magne ( Kedar Ghimire) and Buddhi (Buddhi Tamang). He is not willing to marry despite his mother's repeated requests, citing his neighbour's condition after marriage.

Ateet is jobless but after falling love with Brinda asks her father for marriage. Brinda's father refuses at first, but relents after Ateet is chosen to receive a US Diversity Visa. He marries Brinda and goes to the US, promising to take Brinda when her papers are ready. However, Brinda falls in love with Raja and they have an affair.

Magne stays with his mother, who becomes sick, after which he knows that the mother loves him so much. He then vies for employment abroad.

Saraswati blames his father for his feminine name and loves a village girl Bishnu. Saraswati goes abroad for employment after Bishnu's father challenges him to earn money.

Buddhi is married but jobless. Buddhi is incited to beat up his wife by his friends by drinking alcohol. This leads to serious row between the couple and Buddhi's wife goes to her brother's house.

While taking revenge on Buddhi's brother-in-law, Champa criticises Raja. However, she accepts Raja's clumsy marriage proposal. Champa succeeds at bringing Raja into the track and bring happiness to his family. But in the twist of the story, Champa and Aryan try to kill Raja and they elope. Raja, infuriated, looks for the duo and moves to Kathmandu.

Raja finds Magne in Kathmandu, unable to go abroad because of manpower agency and now a goon. Raja with his friends Saraswati, Magne and Buddhi locate Champa and Aryan, only to get surprised with Ateet as the bride for his wife Champa. Ateet reveals that after his return, he knows about Raja and Brinda's relationship and planned the plot to make Raja feel when you lose someone you dearly love.

In the end, Ateet marries Champa and Raja becomes a hermit while Brinda stays at Raja's house and gives birth to a baby. Sarawsati marries Bishnu and Buddhi reconciles with his wife before going for foreign employment. Magne now with his mother proposes Deepa for marriage.

== Cast ==
- Deepak Raj Giri as Raja
- Priyanka Karki as Champa
- Kedar Ghimire as Magne
- Jeetu Nepal as Saraswati
- Buddhi Tamang as Buddhi (jt .i.e. joytingra)
- Shivahari Poudel as Ateet
- Barsha Raut as Brinda
- Namrata Sapkota as Bishnu
- Basundhara Bhusal as Raja's mother
- Absishkar Rijal as Oldman
- Pramod Agrahari as Baba Masta Mola
- Deepa Shree Niraula in (special guest appearance)
- Aaryan Sigdel as Attet's friend (special appearance)
- TR Limboo as new boy (cameo appearance)

== Songs ==
No.	Title	Lyrics	Music	Singer(s)	Length
1.	"Purba Pashchim Rail"	Rajan Raj Shiwakoti	Rajan Raj Shiwakoti	Rajan Raj Shiwakoti, Anju Panta	5:23
2.	"Dekhana Champa Sunana Champa"	Shanti Priya	Deepak Sharma	Krishna Kafle, Deepa Shree Niraula	3:23
Total length:					8m 46s

== Reception ==
The movie's viewership surpassed that of Hindi films Baar Baar Dekho and Freaky Ali. The film even attracted prime ministers KP Oli, Jhalanath Khanal and Madhav Kumar Nepal. Comedians Madan Krishna Shrestha and Hari Bansha Acharya also accompanied ministers to the show. Prime Minister Oli reviewed Chhakka Panja as a good film but criticised its title. Jhalanath Khanal also gave good reviews to the film saying that the film unsettled him with its social satire. The Himalayan Times wrote "Chhakka Panja is a total comedy and social drama, a story of friendship, love and revenge. It is hilarious from start to finish." It was publicly posted on YouTube on 12 January 2017.

== Awards ==
List of awards and nominations
Ceremony	Category	Recipient	Result
NEFTA Film Awards	Encouragement Award	Dipashree Niraula	Won

== Piracy ==
On 12 January 2017, actor and producer Deepak Raj Giri revealed that the movie was leaked on Facebook. Later on 13 January 2017, a person committed suicide after he was implicated in the piracy but the police found that he was not connected. Actor Deepak Raj Giri posted on his Facebook page that he felt sorry for the boy who committed suicide.

== Sequel ==
After the huge success of Chhakka Panja, the director and writer i.e. Deepa Shree Niraula and Deepak Raj Giri announced a sequel. Some familiar faces as well as new characters would appear, but audiences were assured a fresh story with Chhakka Panja 2. After the release of songs for Chhaka Panja 2 the singer Almoda was accused of stealing the song "Ye Daju." A lawsuit followed, and rumours suggested that Chhaka Panja 2 would not be as successful as its predecessor. Additional troubles occurred as the popular actor featured in Chhakka Panja, Rudra Prasad Bhattarai aka "Lajalam," died.
