= Pradeep Bastola =

Nepali actor (born 1990)

- प्रदिप बास्तोला
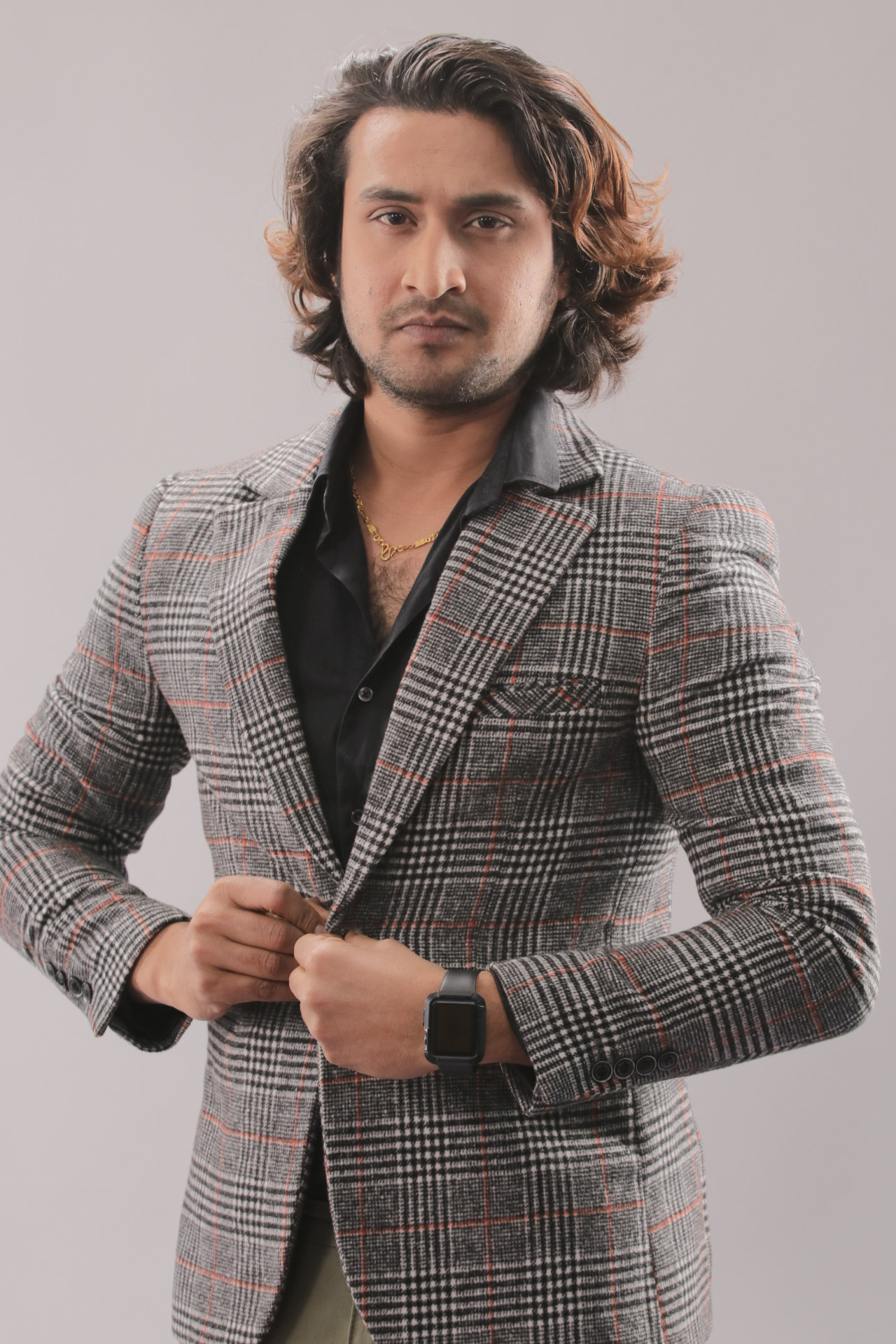
- Born: November 25, 1990 (age 34); Kathmandu, Nepal
- Occupation: Actor

Pradeep Bastola(Nepali: प्रदिप बास्तोला; born 1990) is a Nepali actor.

== Career ==
Bastola born in 1990 he started his acting career in 2009 from a television series college which was telecasted on Kantipur TV. He is very well known for his movies "Adhakatti (2015)" and "Subha Love(2019)." He has acted in numerous music videos like "Sachikai ho ki khyal khyalma,""Lutnu raicha," "Aajako Yo Saanjh," "Jhilmil jhilmil," "Saila Maya Nalaam Bho," "Pipal chautari" etc. Theatre framas like "Ashwet (2018)" and "Darpan (2019)," has proven his prominent acting abilities to the audience. Bastola has also hosted the reality TV show "Boogie Woogie. He has worked in the movies like Kollywood (2012), Love you baba (2014), Katha Kathmandu (2018) etc.

Movies
Year	Movie name	publisher	Director's Name	Role
2016	Adhkatti	Budha Subba Digital	Subrat Acharya	Actor
2020	Subha love	OSR Digital	Santos Babu Lohani	Actor

Music Videos
Year	Music Video Name	publisher	Role
2013	Sachikai ho ki khyal khyal ma	Mantra Dibya	Cast
2013	Lutnu raicha	Deven Giri	Cast
2015	Timi bata chuttine kura	Budha subba digital	Cast
2016	Jhilmil jhilmi	Sanjib parajuli	Cast
2013	Aajako yo saanjh	Ajambari News	Cast
2018	Paisa	Highlights Nepal	Cast
2018	Mumfali	Highlights Nepal	Cast
2019	Saila maya Nalaune bho	Basanta Sapkota	Cast
2019	Jani Jani Euta galti	Sanjib parajuli	Cast
2019	Haatma ghadi Thikka paryo	Sanjib parajuli	Cast
2019	Ma timro sahar chodi tadha	BB Thapa Entertainment	Cast
2020	Pilaideuna sannani	Creative Archive Nepal	Cast
2021	Hawa Sarara	DG production UK	Cast
2019	Samay Parkhidaina	Pradeep Bastola	Cast
2020	Jeevan jiune Bahana	Bodha Knowledge and Entertainment	Cast
2020	Paayau Ya gumaayau	Bodha Knowledge and Entertainment	Cast
2015	Nepallai salaam	Pradeep Bastola	Cast
2020	Bhusuna	Pradeep Bastola	Cast
2021	Pipal Chautari	Aafnai online	Cast
2017	Palash	Highlights Nepal	Cast
2015	Timro Figure Coca-Cola	Budha subba Digital	Cast

== Awards ==
Year	Award	Category
2019	NMFA the best actor Awards	Best Actor
2021	NMFA the best actor Awards	Honor as an Actor
2021	National Entertainment Awards	Lado Tunturi Honor
