= Sapana Roka Magar =

Nepalese crematorium worker

Sapana Roka Magar (Nepali: सपना रोका मगर) is a Nepalese crematorium worker, who was selected as one of the 100 most influential women of 2020 by the BBC. She is involved in the cremation of abandoned bodies from the street or mortuaries and arranges for them to be taken to hospital for post-mortem examinations. If the body remains unclaimed for more than 35 days, the cremation is performed according to Hindu rituals.

== Biography ==
Originally, Roka was from Myagdi District of Nepal. She was born on 10 February 2002 as the youngest child of Jit Prasad Roka Magar (father) and Nanu Roka Magar (mother). At 14, she moved to Butwal where she moved in with a teenage boy against her parents' wishes. The relationship broke down in a few months and she became homeless. In the streets, she became acquainted with Action for Social Change, an NGO, and began to work with them from where she operates the cremation and other social activities.

She is also involved in feeding the homeless during the COVID-19 lockdown in Kathmandu.
