= Chhakka Panja 4 =

2023 Nepali film directed by Hem Raj B.C.

- Theatrical release poster
- Nepali: छक्का पन्जा ४
- Directed by: Hem Raj BC
- Written by: Deepak Raj Giri
- Produced by: Dipendra Khaniya; Kesav Neupane; Kedar Ghimire; Nirmal Sharma
- Starring: Deepak Raj Giri; Benisha Hamal; Kedar Ghimire; Neer Shah; Nirmal Sharma; Buddhi Tamang; Deepa Shree Niraula; Raj Acharya; Prem Pandey
- Edited by: Nimesh Shrestha; Ankit Khan Thakuri; Bipin Malla
- Production companies: Aama Saraswoti Movies; IME Present
- Release date: March 3, 2023
- Country: Nepal
- Language: Nepali
- Budget: est.रू1 crore
- Box office: est.रू17.53 crore

Chhakka Panja 4 (Nepali: छक्का पन्जा ४) is a 2023 Nepalese comedy film written by Deepak Raj Giri and directed by Hem Raj BC. It is the fourth and the latest film in Chakka Panja franchise. Produced by Dipendra Khaniya, Kesav Neupane, Kedar Ghimire, and Nirmal Sharma under the banner of Aama Saraswoti Movies. It stars Deepak Raj Giri, Benisha Hamal, Kedar Ghimire, Neer Shah, Nirmal Sharma, Buddhi Tamang, Deepa Shree Niraula, and Raj Acharya in lead role.

The film was released on March 3, 2023. The film was released nationwide in Nepal as well as more than 500 screens in other countries. The film had biggest opening of 2023 for any film in Nepal and went on to become second highest grossing Nepali film in Nepal at the time.

== Synopsis ==
Its a political comedy-drama that revolves around the character of Dik Vijay, also known as Raja, the son of Nirvaya Singh, a formidable and influential political party head. The story intensifies when Nirvaya Singh becomes paralyzed, and the responsibility of leading the political party falls unexpectedly to Dik Vijay. This transition is fraught with complexity, as Dik Vijay has been more known for his involvement in criminal operations rather than political acumen.

As a significant political election approaches, the film chronicles Raja's journey thrust into the cutthroat world of politics and media scrutiny. It explores the clash between the establishment and the changing dynamics of power, and how Raja's initial exploitation of his new influence and power gradually gives way to a path of self-correction and righteousness.

The film blends comedy and drama to deliver social satire, following Raja's transformation and whether he is able to rise to the occasion, fulfill his father's duties and become the good person he needs to be, despite his initial reluctance and criminal background.

== Cast ==
- Deepak Raj Giri as Dik Vijay Singh (Raja)
- Benisha Hamal as Alisha
- Kedar Ghimire as Sanjel
- Neer Shah as Nirvaya Singh
- Buddhi Tamang as Buddhi
- Nirmal Sharma
- Raj Acharya
- Deepa Shree Niraula
- Malina Joshi
- Bedana Rai
- Sushma Niraula
- Sabin Bastola
- Loonibha Tuladhar
- Prem Pandey

== Music ==
First song, Darshan Salam was released on January 30, 2023. The second song, Sirupate Jungama was released on March 7, 2023.

No.	Title	Music	Singers	Length
1.	"Darshan Salam"	Dipak Sharma	David Shankar, Sahima Shrestha	5:01
2.	"Sirupate Jungama"	Babul Giri	Babul Giri	4:53
Total length:				9:54

== Box office ==
According to the Film Development Board, it grossed approximately रू17.53 crore in Nepal, making it the highest-grossing Nepali film of the year, and one of the highest grossing Nepali film of all time.
