= Chhakka Panja 5 =

2024 Nepali film directed by Deepa Shree Niraula

- Theatrical release poster
- Nepali: छक्का पन्जा ५
- Directed by: Deepa Shree Niraula
- Written by: Deepak Raj Giri
- Produced by: Keshav Neupane; Dipendra Khaniya
- Starring: Deepak Raj Giri; Kedar Ghimire; Deepa Shree Niraula; Barsha Siwakoti; Raja Ram Poudel; Prakash Ghimire
- Cinematography: Uttam Humagain
- Edited by: Bipin Malla
- Music by: Sambhujeet Baskota; Dipak Sharma; Babul Giri
- Production companies: Aama Saraswoti Movies; IME Present
- Release date: October 10, 2024
- Running time: 165 mins
- Country: Nepal
- Language: Nepali
- Budget: est.रू3 crore
- Box office: est.रू15.20 crore

Chhakka Panja 5 (Nepali: छक्का पन्जा ५) is a 2024 Nepali comedy film written by Deepak Raj Giri and directed by Deepa Shree Niraula. Produced by Keshav Neupane and Dipendra Khaniya under the banner of Aama Saraswoti Movies and IME Present. It stars Deepak Raj Giri, Kedar Ghimire, Deepa Shree Niraula, Barsha Siwakoti, Raja Ram Poudel, and Prakash Ghimire.

it was released on October 10, 2024, during the festival of Dashain.

== Synopsis ==
The story centers on Prithivi, an honest and patriotic government officer who believes he is descended from King Prithivi Narayan Shah. Guided by his father's teachings to serve the nation, Prithivi strives to work for betterment of society and lessen corruption. However, his integrity causes him more trouble than good, as he is pressurized by his family and society to follow the path of corrupt officers.

Through persuasion from a marriage-arranging agent, Roshani ends up marrying Prithivi. Roshani dreams of living abroad, which contrasts sharply with Prithivi's strong patriotic ideologies that prevent him from leaving Nepal. The film uses this scenario, where an honest officer is met with societal disdain, to deliver a satirical critique on the pervasive normalization of corruption in Nepali society.

== Cast ==
- Deepak Raj Giri as Prithivi Bikram / Raja
- Kedar Ghimire as Magne
- Barsha Siwakoti as Roshni
- Deepa Shree Niraula
- Raja Ram Poudel
- Prakash Ghimire
- Mexam Gaudel
- Narendra Thapa

== Soundtrack ==
Bihe Bhako Chhaina was released on August 12, 2024. Breakup Song was released on September 18, 2024.

No.	Title	Music	Singers	Length
1.	"Bihe Bhako Chhaina"	Dipak Sharma	Sabin Subedi, Benisha Poudel	5:01
2.	"Breakup Song"	Babul Giri	Babul Giri, Deepa Shree Niraula	5:35
Total length:				10:36

== Box office ==
The film grossed रू15.20 crore at the Nepal box office according to the official report by Film Development Board.

== See also ==
- List of most expensive Nepali films
- List of Nepalese films
- Chhakka Panja franchise
