= Shivahari Poudel =

Nepali actor and comedian

- शिवहरी पौडेल
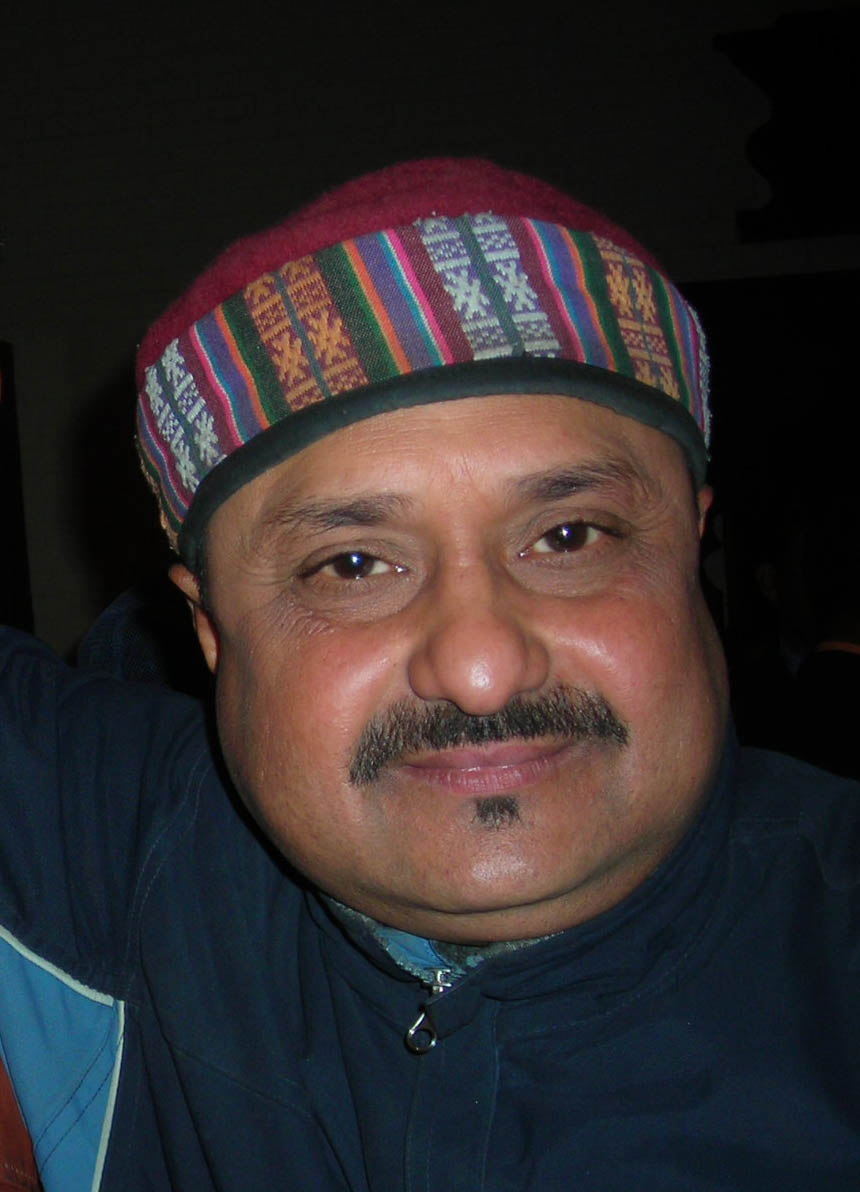
- Shivahari Poudel
- Born: 13 September 1973 (age 53); Kathmandu, Nepal
- Occupations: Comedian, actor, writer, director
- Years active: 1997–present

Shivahari Poudel (Nepali: शिवहरी पौडेल) (born 13 September 1973), popularly known as Shankar Prasad, is a Nepalese comedian, writer and director of Nepali weekly comedy television series Jire khursani and Brake Fail. He has also acted in the 2013 Nepalese movie Chha Ekan Chha and guested on the comedy show Tito Satya. He also performs in Gai Jatra, where popular comedians from Nepal performs together.

== Filmography ==
=== Films ===
Year	Title	Role	Notes	Ref(s)
1997	Karodpati			
1999	Ek Number Ko Pakhe	Driver		
2002	Mitini			
2003	Muna Madan			
2014	Chha Ekan Chha			
2015	Woda Number 6			
2016	Chhakka Panja	Ateet		
2017	Chhakka Panja 2	Prabhu		
2018	Shatru Gate	Consultancy manpower worker	Also producer.	
2018	Chhakka Panja 3	School headmaster		
2019	Hajar Juni Samma			
2019	Dal Bhat Tarkari			
2022	Lakka Jawan	Also writer and director, and his directorial debut in cinema.		
2022	December Falls			

=== Television ===
Year	Title	Role	Notes	Ref(s)
2003-2018	Jire Khursani	Asina Prasad	Also writer and director of the show.	
2016-2018	Brake Fail		Also writer and director of the show.	
