= Jeetu Nepal =

Comedian and Actor from Nepal

Jeet Bahadur Nepal
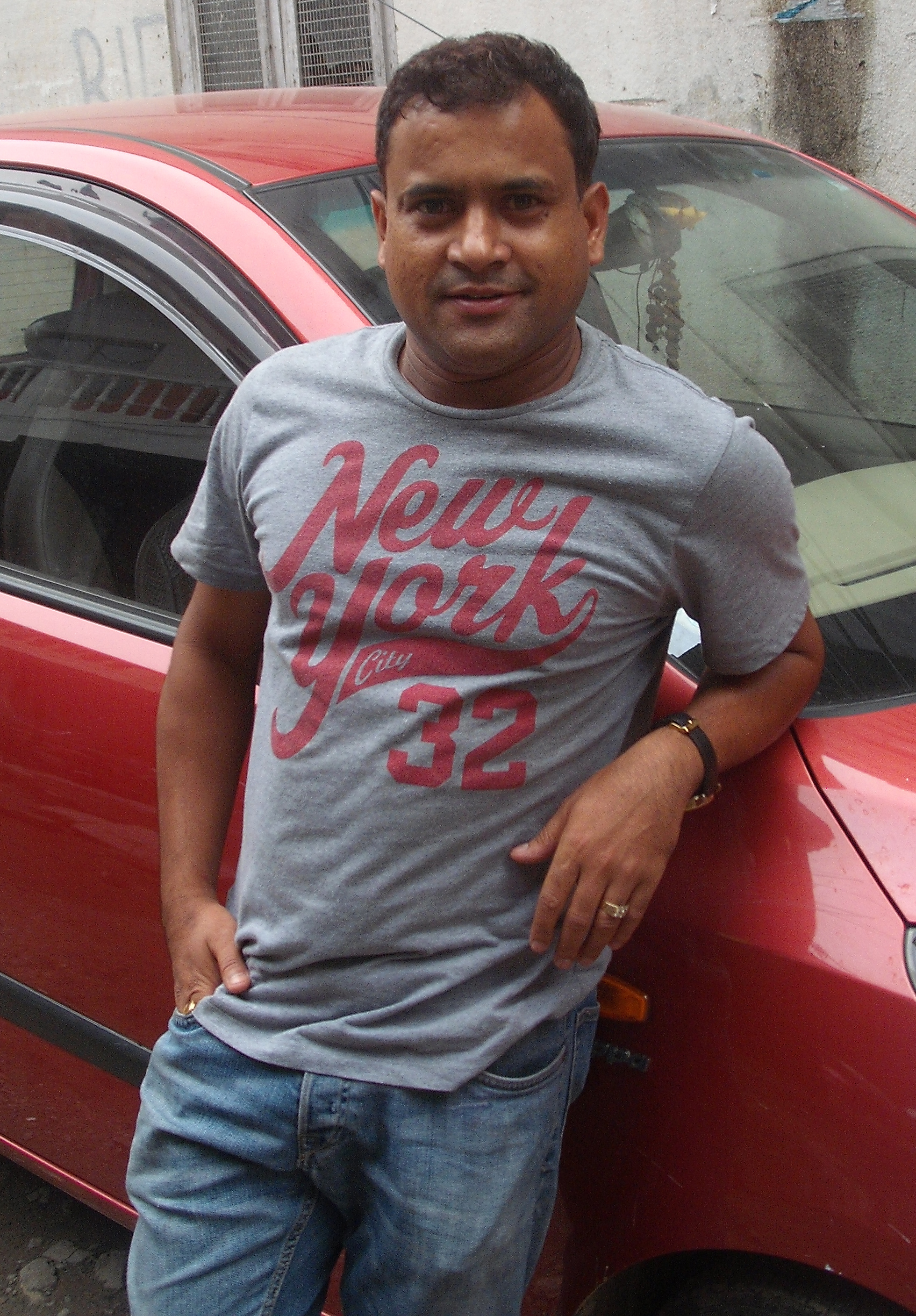
- Born: Jeet Bahadur Nepal; 15 June 1975 (age 51); Sindhupalchok District, Nepal
- Other name: मुन्द्रे
- Occupations: Comedian; actor; writer; director; producer; television presenter; playback singer
- Years active: 2003–present
- Spouse: Muna Nepal
- Children: 2

Jeet Bahadur Nepal, also called Jitu Nepal (Nepali: जितु नेपाल), is a Nepali stand-up comedian, writer, actor and director. He started his television career with the show Twakka Tukka. He has acted in more than three dozen Nepali movies, including Cha Ekan Cha, Chhakka Panja, Chhakka Panja 2, and Chhakka Panja 3. He is well-known for his role as Mundre in the teleserial Jire Khursani. In 2018, he started a comedy and chat show named Mundre Ko Comedy Club. He is one of the most loved artists for his stage performance in Mahotsav and festival of Nepalese people in Nepal living abroad.

== Early and personal life ==
Nepal was born in Jyamire village of Sindhupalchowk district of Nepal. He hails from a middle-class family. He is the seventh child of his parents. He has five elder brothers and an elder sister.

He studied at Jalpa Secondary School, Sindhupalchowk. He passed his School Leaving Certificate examination in 1992.

Nepal married Muna Nepal on 25 February 2003. They had a daughter and a son.

== Filmography ==
=== Television ===
Year	Title	Role	Note
1990-1994	Twakka Tukka		
1993-1995	Sangalo		
1994-1996	Kaukuti		
1996-1996	Mukti		
2002-2004	Gitanjali		
2003-2015	Jire Khursani	Mundre	
2018–2021	Mundre Ko Comedy Club	Host	

=== First phrase films ===
Year	Film	Role	Note
1998	Guru Chela		
1999	Surakshya		
2000	Chalchitra		
2001	Darpan Chaya	College Friend	
2001	Manai Ta Ho		
2001	Dhan Sampati		
2001	Mero Hajur		
2001	Doman		
2001	Lahana		
2002	Pooja		
2002	Bhannai Sakina		
2003	Dui Kinara		
2004	Majhi Dai		
2005	Prem Yuddha		
2005	Kahin Milan Kahi Bichhod		
2007	Kismat		
2010	Sapanako Naulo Sansar		
2010	Man Mutu Ra Maya		

=== Second phrase films ===
Year	Film	Role	Credited as		Notes
Year	Film	Role	Writer	Producer	Notes
2014	Chha Ekan Chha	Lawyer	No	No	
2015	Woda Number 6	Birkhe	No	No	
2016	Chhakka Panja	Saraswati	Yes	Yes	
2017	Chhakka Panja 2	Saraswati	No	Yes	
2018	Ramkahani	Jarnadan	No	No	
2018	Chhakka Panja 3	Thaneshwor	Yes	Yes	
2019	Cha Maya Chhapakai	Prabin	No	No	
2023	Harry Ki Pyari †	Harry	No	No	
2024	Jwai Saab †	Gobardhan Pandit	No	No	
2025	Karsang †	Yam Sherpa	No	No	
2026	I Am Jeet Bahadur		No	Yes	

== Awards ==
Ceremony	Category	Movie	Result
Dcine Awards 2017	Best Actor in a Supporting Role (Male)	Woda Number 6	Won
Kamana Film Awards 2018	Best Actor in a Supporting Role (Male)	Chhakka Panja	Won
Kamana Film Awards 2019	Best Actor in a Supporting Role (Male)	Chhakka Panja 2	Nominated
National Film Awards 2019	Special Contribution Award		Won
Kamana Film Awards 2020	Best Actor in a Supporting Role (Male)	Chhakka Panja 3	Nominated
