= NFDC National Film Awards =

NFDC National Film Awards is one of the most prominent awards of Nepali cinema. The awards are chosen by the National Film Development Company. NFDC -Nepal Film Development Company Ltd was innately established by former King & Government of Nepal in 2028 B.C as Royal Nepal Film Organization. The main motives to establish RNFO was to produce and promote Nepali feature films to the International market, to organize national, international Film Festival and to encourage Nepali film makers, artists, musicians, technicians by giving National Film Awards. Government of Nepal did privatization various organization mean time Royal Nepal Film Organization became Nepal Film Development Company Ltd. Currently Government of Nepal has given management to Gopi Krishna entertainment Pvt Ltd. NFDC has been Awarding NFDC NATIONAL FILMS AWARD under twenty categories in Nepali film industry every year. NFDC where all the technical works film shooting, film editing, Re-recording sound mixing, Develop and Scan the film with all the other works related with producing a film can be commenced here. NFDC has provided its services to the Hollywood and various other foreign film production companies from around the globe.
