= Jire Khursani =

Nepali television show

- Intertitle of Jire Khursani
- Nepali: जिरे खुर्सानी
- Genre: Sitcom; Drama
- Created by: Shivahari Paudel; Jeetu Nepal; Daman Rupakheti
- Developed by: Media Hub
- Written by: Jeetu Nepal; Shivahari Paudel
- Directed by: Shivahari Paudel; Jeetu Nepal
- Starring: Jeetu Nepal; Shivahari Paudel
- Opening theme: "Tala dekhi mathi samma"
- Composer: Chetan Sapkota
- Country of origin: Nepal
- Original language: Nepali
- No. of seasons: 2
- No. of episodes: 559 ([[534 (Season 1); 25 (Season 2)|list of episodes]])

Production
- Executive producers: Jeetu Nepal; Shivahari Paudel
- Producer: Media Hub
- Production locations: Kathmandu, Nepal
- Cinematography: Manraj Shrestha 'Gurjudhara'
- Editor: Rabin Bhatta
- Camera setup: Multiple Camera
- Running time: 22 minutes
- Production company: Ram Saraswati (RamSar) Media Pvt. Ltd.

Original release
- Network: NTV
- Release: 2003 – present

Jire Khursani (Nepali: जिरे खुर्सानी; Translation: Tiny hot Chillies) was a popular Nepali sitcom that aired every Wednesday at 9 p.m. NPT on Nepal Television. It was one of the most viewed television programs in Nepal. It was produced by Media Hub Pvt. Ltd. Exclusive copyrights of Jire Khursani for international and web broadcasting are held by Ram Saraswoti (RamSar) Media Pvt. Ltd.

== Beginning ==
The series started in 2003 and ended in 2015 after 12 years of continuous broadcast. It has already restarted again. It was produced and directed by Jeetu Nepal and Shivahari Paudel who were the main actors in the show as well.

== Characters ==
- Shivahari Paudel as Asina Prasad
- Jeetu Nepal as Mundre
- Kiran K.C. as Mama
- Rajaram Paudel as Thulo Bau
- Sabita Gurung as Thuli
- Anju Shrestha as Hatti
- Manoj Acharya as Khurapati Hakim
- Hima Koirala as Khurapati Hakimni
- Gopal Nepal Fiste as "niyam kada cha" traffic
- Debiram Parajuli as Bhoke
- Dolma Lama as Dolma
- Shivahari Bairagi as Neta Ji
- Niraj Nepal as Mukunde
- Prem Pandey
- Shishir Amgai
- Shivahari Acharya
- Mukunda Acharya
- Nirmal Paudel
- Sudarshan Shibakoti
- Saramsh Thapaliya

== Plot ==
Jire Khursani portrays social problems suffered by everyday people with a comic punch. The show also features issues of polygamy; two wives of Shivahari Paudel live under the same roof with their children.

Jeetu Nepal plays Mundre (Mr. Ear-ring wearer) who says it with much pride that he is the first one in his entire family to have passed SLC. He wears a wool cap all year round and a lot of jewellery. The role of his father Asina Prasad (Mr. Hailstones) is played by Shivahari Paudel, who has a habit of saying "Mukhama Hannu Jasto" all the time. He has two wives out of which the latter one is the mother of Mundre. The other one is Chothale, whose son is Bhoke. Bhoke is a consummate eater and hungry all the time. He eats all the time and when not fed breaks into a fit of sobs.

Mama (maternal uncle) is played by Kiran K.C. who has a habit of saying "Eh Rata Makai" and was married to a rich Sherpa girl who merely uses him as an object of desire. Frustrated, the show takes crazy twists and revolves around a restless and noisy family. Rajaram Poudel has also special role as Thulo Bau (paternal uncle) of Mundre.

Asina Prasad is the main character. He makes the show interesting with his crooked attitude. He has many messes with law and other people and this show revolves in a plot of comedy by crookery.
