= Tito Satya =

Nepali comedy television series

- तीतो सत्य
- Genre: Sitcom; Drama
- Created by: Deepak Raj Giri
- Developed by: Aama Saraswati Movies Pvt. Ltd.
- Written by: Deepak Raj Giri
- Directed by: Deepak Raj Giri
- Starring: Deepak Raj Giri; Deepa Shree Niraula; Gopal Dhakal; Prem Pandey
- Opening theme: "Satya Tito Satya"
- Composer: Deepak Raj Giri
- Country of origin: Nepal
- Original language: Nepali
- No. of seasons: 9
- No. of episodes: 602

Production
- Producer: Media Hub
- Production locations: Kathmandu, Nepal
- Camera setup: Multiple camera
- Running time: 24 minutes

Original release
- Network: Nepal Television
- Release: 2003 – 2015

Tito Satya (Nepali: तितो सत्य) was a Nepali sitcom weekly television series that premiered in 2003. Deepak Raj Giri was the script writer, director, and one of the main characters. The show aired every Thursday on Nepal Television. Integrating political and social topics into a comedy drama, Tito Satya was one of the most viewed programs in Nepal. The show ended in November 2015 after 12 years of continuous broadcast.

== Cast ==
- Deepak Raj Giri as Deepak
- Deepa Shree Niraula as Deepa
- Gopal Adhikari as Twakendra
- Nirmal Sharma as Nirmal Boss, often called by teasing as Gaida ("Rhinoceros")
- Raj Acharya as Raj (son of Deepak and Deepa)
- Prem Pandey
- Gopal Nepal
- Gopal Dhakal as Chhande
- Shishir Amgai
- Ram Mani Bhattarai
- Uddav Bhattarai
- Sine Adhikari
- Mukunda Mainali
