= NEFTA Film Awards =

Nepalese film award ceremony

NEFTA Film Award
- Awarded for: Excellence in film making
- Country: Nepal
- Presented by: Nepal Film Technician Association
- Final award: 2023
- Website: https://neftanepal.org.np/

NEFTA International Film Award is award ceremony for Nepali movies organized by Nepal Film Technician Association. The award ceremony is a popular and significant award ceremony in Nepal.

NEFTA has successfully organized 11 award ceremonies and its 11th and final ceremony was held in Dallas, Texas on 22 July 2023.

== Awards ==
The award is given in various categories including Best Film, Best Director, Best Screenplay, Best Actor, Best Actress, Best Supporting Actor, Best Supporting Actress, Best New Actor, Best New Actress and others.

=== Popular Awards ===
- Best Film
- Best Director
- Best Screenplay
- Best Actor
- Best Actress
- Best Supporting Actor
- Best Supporting Actress
- Best New Director
- Best New Actor
- Best New Actress

=== Musical Awards ===
- Best Sound Mixing Award
- Best Music Arrangement
- Best playback singer

=== Technical Awards ===
- Best Cinematography
- Best Editing
- Best Art Direction
- Best Lighting
- Best Music
- Best Visual Effects
- Best Sound
- Best lyrics
- Best Recording Engineer
- Best Mixing/Mastering Engineer

=== Special awards ===
- Kala Ratna Award
- Appreciation Award
- Ethnic film award
