= Deepa Shree Niraula =

Nepalese actress and director

Deepa Shree Niroula
- दिपा श्री निरौला
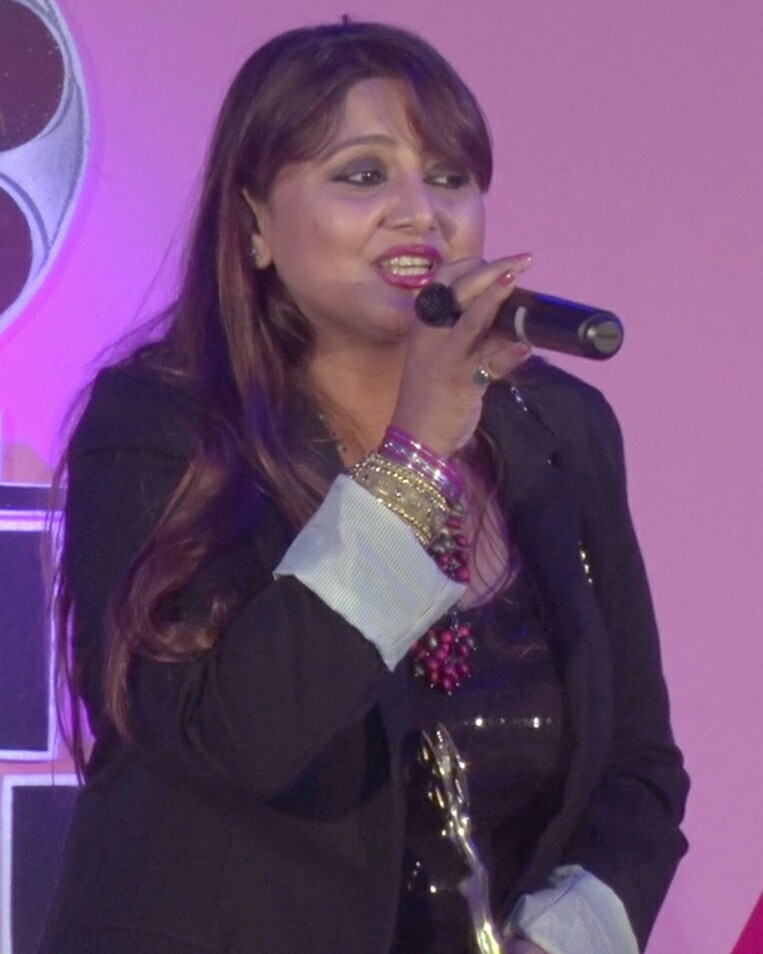
- Deepa Shree Niroula
- Born: Biratnagar, Nepal
- Education: Intermediate level
- Occupations: Comedian, actress, director, singer
- Years active: 1990–present

Deepa Shree Niraula (दिपाश्री निरौला) is a Nepalese actress, comedian, director and radio personality. Beginning her career with supporting roles in films, she is known for her role in the Nepali television sitcom Tito Satya. One of the most popular comedian and actresses of Nepalese Cinema, she is also the Highest Grossing film director of Nepalese Cinema. She is known for directing the highest grossing franchise of the Nepali film franchise Chhakka Panja and was a permanent guest in the first season of Mundre Ko Comedy Club.

== Early life ==
Deepa Shree Niraula has an intermediate level education from Mahendra Morang Campus affiliated to Tribhuwan University in Biratnagar.

== Career ==
Niraula started acting through Tharu Cinema, starring in Hatai Kuhira, which is filmed in Tharu languages. She later made her debut in Nepali cinema, but she only earned recognition after she played in the television serial Tito Satya. She has also acted in the Sanskrit language film Raag-Biragam.

== Films ==
- Sundar Mero Naam
- Naso
- Gaule
- Sukumbasi
- Surakshya
- Ghar-Sansar
- Chamatkar
- Pareli
- Chalachitra
- Chandani
- Aawara
- Chautari
- Woda no 6
- Khar ko Chano
- Chha Ekan Chha (Producer)
- Chhakka Panja (Director, guest appearance)
- Chhakka Panja 2 (Director, guest appearance)
- Chhakka Panja 3 (Director)
- Chhakka Panja 4
- Chhakka Panja 5 (Director, actor)

=== Television shows ===
- Tityo Satya as Deepa (2003-2015)
- Mundre Ko Comedy Club as Permanent guest (2018-2020)
- Comedy Club with Champions as Permanent guest (2022–present)

=== Tele-films ===
Her tele-films include:

- Aagni-path
- Chemeki
- Sanahi roi rahecha
- Paribhasa
- Hile Dashain
- Abiral Bagda cha Indrawati
- Prayaschit
- Aasha ko Diyo
- Bigyapan
- Fulwa
- Tai chup Mai chup
- Khadma ko Gaun
- Devi
- Santan
- Parinam
- Nepal ko Raj Parampara
- Bis Minute
- Jeevan- Yatra
- Tulkee
- Sankat
- Malati
- Bansha
- Sangini

=== Ethnic Films ===
Her ethnic films include:

- Badlaab in Bhojpuri
- Aagni-Path in Maithali
- Kuhira in Tharu
- Raag-Biragam in Sanskrit
