= Shahil Khan =

Nepali film editor

Shahil Khan शाहील खान
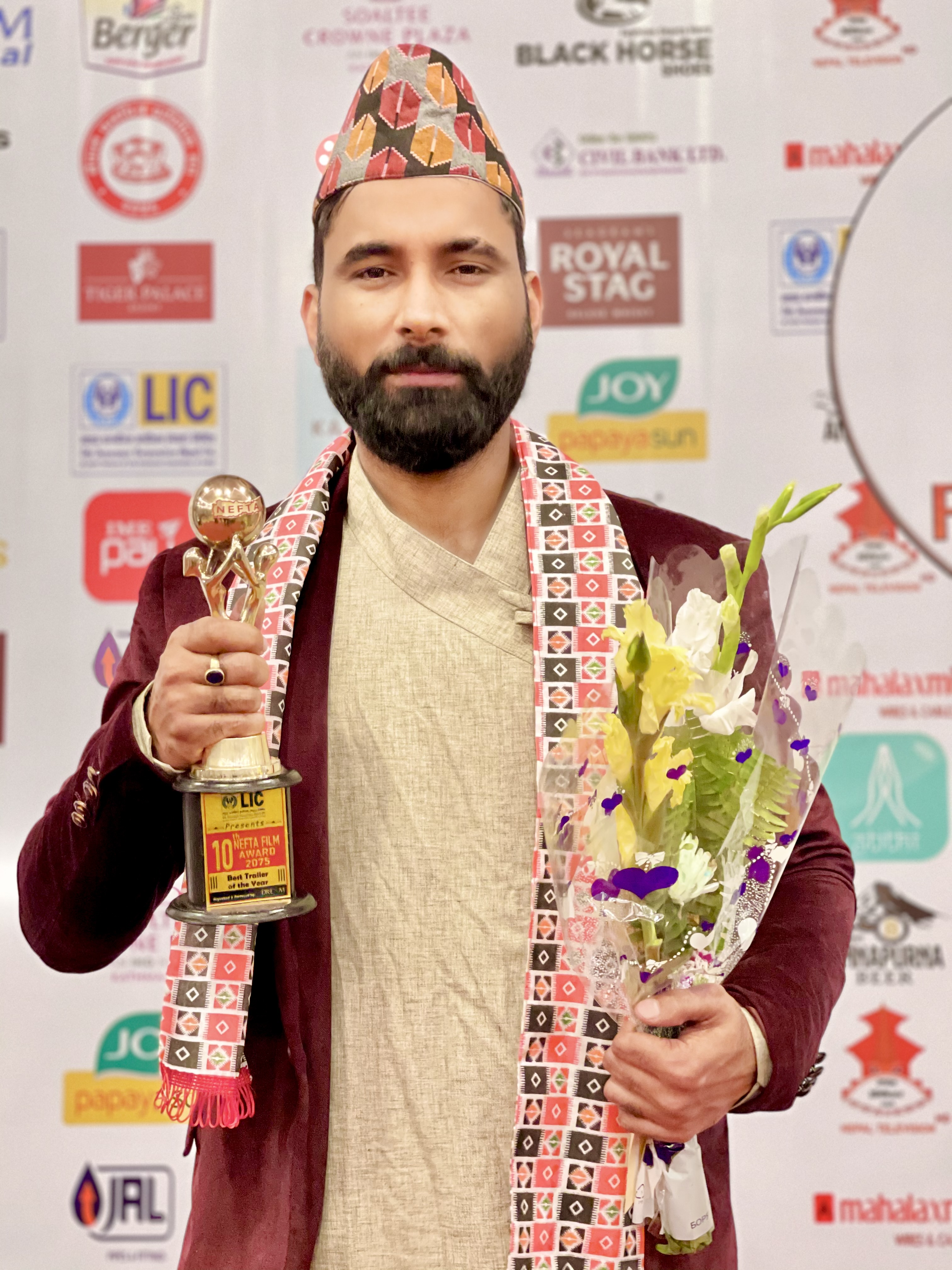
- Born: Khalid Khan; July 5, 1987; Rangapur, Kapilvastu District, Nepal
- Occupation: Film Editor
- Years active: 2007-present
- Known for: Shahil Khan
- Parents: Nisar Ahmad Khan (father); Salma Khan (mother)
- Awards: LG Film Award Nepal 2016; Box Office Film Fare Award 2017; 10th NEFTA Film Award 2021

Khalid Khan (born 5 July 1987), known professionally as Shahil Khan Nepali: शाहील खान, is a Nepali film editor. He has mainly worked on Nepali films. He has introduced several new editing techniques into the region's films. He has 2 LG Film Awards (Nepal), Box Office Film Fair Award, and many more awards and nominations under his name. Dreams and Bhairav remain his best work. Dreams earned him the LG Film Awards 2016 for Best trailer editor and Bhairav won the LG Film Awards 2016 for Best Film Editor.

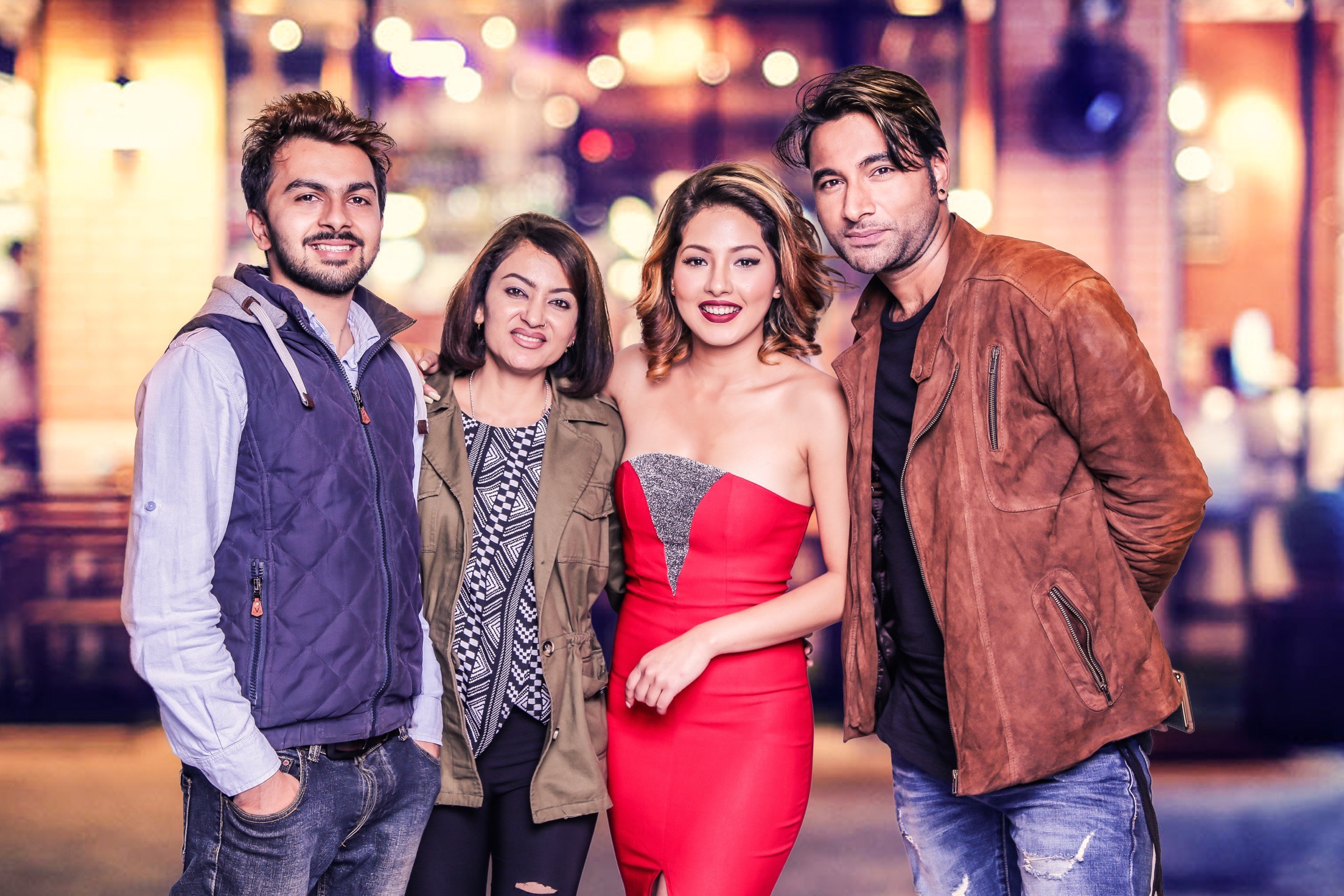
Shahil Khan in the Photoshoot of A Mero Hajur 2 (Nepali Movie)

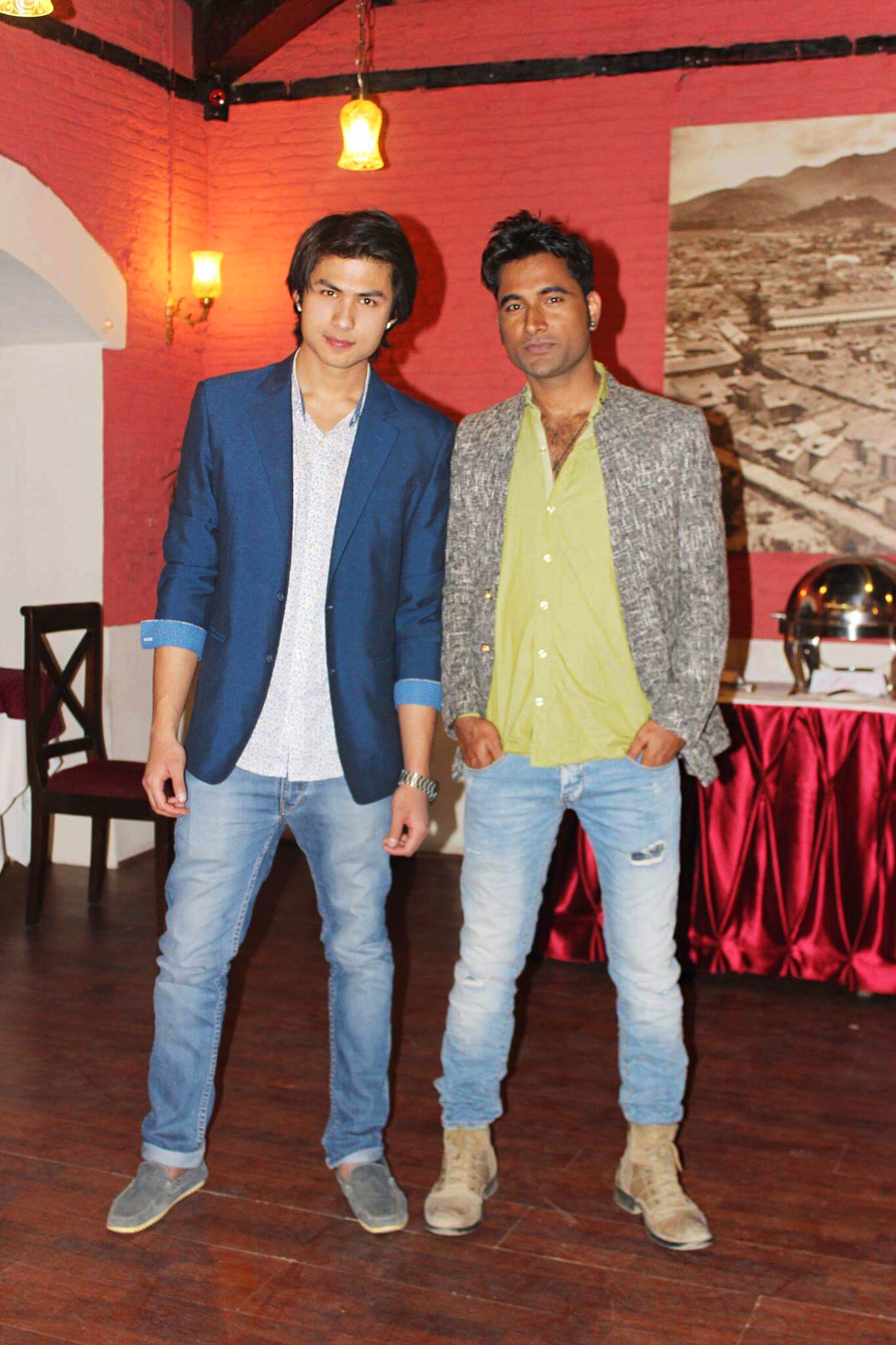
Shahil Khan with Anmol K.C. in success party of Dreams (2016 film).

== Early life ==
Shahil's birth name is Khalid Khan. Khan is the son of Nisar Ahmad Khan (father) and Salma Khan (mother) and was born in Yashodhara Rural Municipality Rangapur, Kapilvastu, Nepal. Khan's after years of living near the border went to continue his intermediate education in Banaras, India. However, he left his studies midway to pursue his interest in film editing when he got a call to study under Mr. Aslam Khan (Chairperson -Taal Music) in the capital, Kathmandu.

== Career ==
=== Early work: 2008-2012 ===
Khan's first started working as an assistant editor in Busy Bee entertainment in 2008. After three years, he worked as the main editor for the same company. His first reputable work was for Facebook (2012) directed by Suraj Subba under famous actress/director Jharna Thapa. His editing work showcased a mix of traditional Nepali, Bollywood, and Hollywood styles for which he gained popularity among the Nepali Film Industry. Later, he also worked as a news video editor for Sagarmatha TV.

=== Recognition: 2012 - Present ===
He registered his company Movie Factory Pvt Ltd in 2012, which is reputed as one of the best post-production companies in Nepal. Dreams which is the highest notable film from MovieFactory broke the trailer ratings on YouTube in 2016 and was loved by the Nepali people. The film featured some of the famous actors like Anmol K.C, Samragyee RL Shah, and Sandhya KC. The success of the movie made him a prominent public figure in the Nepali Film Industry and for which he was also awarded the LG Film Awards 2016 for Best trailer editor. He has also worked on Nai Nabhannu La 2 (2014) which had a 51-day running streak. It is also one of the most loved Nepali movies of all time and features popular actresses like Priyanka Karki. He then went to work on Bhairav featuring Nikhil Upreti, which won him the LF Film Awards 2016 for Best Film Editor. Shahil Khan is currently one of the top influential people in the Nepali film industry to have set a new standard for the film and trailer editing in Nepal. He has worked on more than 25 super hit Nepali moves and more than 100 super hit movie trailers. He received the 10th national Box office film fair 2017 UK Best Trailer Editor Award for Ke ma timro hoina ra.

== Awards and nominations ==
- LG film Awards 2016 Best Trailer editor award for the film Dreams
- LG Film Awards 2016 Best film editor award for the film Bhairav
- 10th National Box office Filmfare award 2017 UK - Best Trailer editor award for the film Ke ma timro hoina ra
- Epic Nepal Music Video award 2019 for the music video Bagney Khola
- 10th NEFTA 2021 Best Trailer Editor Award for the film A Mero Hajur 3

=== Nominations ===
- Film Nai Nabhannu La 2 for Box office film fair award 2014
- Film Ke ma timro hoina ra for LG film awards 2017
- Films Prem geet 2, Ma Yesto Geet Gauchhu 2, and Aishwarya for LG film award 2018

== Filmography ==
Movie	Year	Role
Dreams (2016 film)	2016	Theatrical Trailer
Aabeg	2016	Editor
Champion	2016	Film editor
Shakuntala	2016	Editor
Aarop	2014	Editor
Romeo(Nepali movie 2017)	2017	Editor
Nai Nabhannu La 2 and 3	2014	Poster
Love Diaries	2020	Theatrical Trailer and Editor
