= List of Nepalese models =

The following is a list of Nepalese models.

== A ==
- Ashishma Nakarmi
- Aashirman DS Joshi
- Anupama Aura Gurung
- Aastha Pokharel
- Ayushman Joshi

== B ==
- Bipana Thapa

== J ==
- Jal Shah
- Jharana Bajracharya
- Jharna Thapa

== K ==
- Karishma Manandhar
- Keki Adhikari
- Malina Joshi
- Malvika Subba
- Manisha Koirala

== N ==
- Nikita Chandak
- Namrata Shrestha
- Niruta Singh
- Nischal Basnet
- Nisha Adhikari
- Niti Shah

== P ==
- Payal Shakya
- Paul Shah
- Priyanka Karki
- Prakriti Shrestha

== R ==
- Raj Ballav Koirala
- Rajesh Hamal
- Reecha Sharma
- Rima Bishwokarma
- Ruby Rana

== S ==
- Sahana Bajracharya
- Samragyee RL Shah
- Sarina Maskey
- Shristi Shrestha
- Swastima Khadka

== T ==
- Tripti Nadakar

== U ==
- Usha Rajak
