= Sushil Shrestha =

Nepalese film actor

- Born: July 29, 1992; Kathmandu, Nepal
- Citizenship: Nepalese
- Occupation: Actor
- Years active: 2015 – present
- Known for: Hostel Returns

Sushil Shrestha is Nepalese model and actor who works in Nepali cinema. He made his film debut with 2015 blockbuster film Hostel Returns which earned him Best new actor nomination in NFDC National Award. He then starred in Sunil Rawal's Saayad 2, sequel of Saayad which is all set to release.

Shrestha was also participant to Manhunt International Nepal where he was able to grab title of Prostyle Best Hair.

== Filmography ==
Key
†	Denotes films that have not yet been released

Year	Film	Role	Note
2015	Hostel Returns	Pratap	Block buster
2017	Saayad 2	Anurag	Sequel of Saayad
2017	Karkhana	Bishal	
2019	Baadshah Jutt		
2020	Love Diaries		
2025	OUTLAW: Dafa 219		
2026	Ram Naam Satya		

== Awards ==
List of awards and nominations
Year	Ceremony	Category	Work	Result
2016	NFDC Award 2016	Best new actor	Hostel Returns	Nominated
