= A Mero Hajur =

A Mero Hajur may refer to:

- A Mero Hajur 2, a Nepali musical romantic movie directed by Jharana Thapa
- A Mero Hajur 3 (English: Oh My Dear 3), Nepali romantic comedy-drama film, directed by Jharana Thapa
