= Suhana Thapa =

Nepalese film actress and producer

- Born: May 8, 1998 (age 28); Kathmandu, Nepal
- Education: Teachers College, Columbia University
- Occupations: Actress, film producer
- Years active: 2002–present
- Parent(s): Jharana Thapa; Sunil Kumar Thapa

Suhana Thapa (Nepali: सुहाना थापा; born 8 May 1998) is a Nepalese actress and producer. One of Nepal's leading and highest-paid actresses, her accolades include two Kamana Film Awards. She is known for portraying romantic characters and roles marked by emotional complexity and unpredictability.

Born into a family associated with the Nepali film industry, Thapa is the daughter of actress and filmmaker Jharana Thapa and film producer Sunil Kumar Thapa. She first appeared on screen as a child artist in the 2002 film A Mero Hajur. Later Thapa made her leading role debut with the romantic comedy-drama A Mero Hajur 3 (2019), which earned her the Kamana Film Award for Best Female Debut. Following her debut, Thapa reprised her role as Arya in A Mero Hajur 4 (2022). She subsequently appeared in the social drama Ek Bhagavad Ra Ek Geeta (2023).

== Early life ==
Thapa was born on 8 May 1998 in Kathmandu, Nepal, to film producer Sunil Kumar Thapa and actress Jharana Thapa. She grew up in a family associated with the Nepali film industry and was exposed to filmmaking from an early age. Reflecting on growing up in a film family, Thapa said, “Growing up in a family that has a legacy in the film industry is not easy. There are always expectations from the viewers, and people expect you to live up to the name and be like those who came before you. At times, that can be challenging, but I feel humble and grateful for whatever I have received and for the opportunities that have come my way.”

Thapa spent part of her childhood in a hostel and completed her early education in Nepal. She later attended school in New Delhi, India. She subsequently continued her studies at Teachers College, Columbia University, United States, where she pursued further education. Her time abroad exposed her to a different environment and allowed her to pursue studies outside the film industry.

== Career ==
=== Film production ===
She has also produced A Mero Hajur 2 (2017), A Mero Hajur 3 (2019) and A Mero Hajur 4 ( 2022).

=== Acting career ===
Thapa appeared as a child artist in A Mero Hajur (2002), she recalls "Yes, A Mero Hajur was my first movie, but I hardly remember it since I was very young." In the prequel of A Mero Hajur (2002) she appeared as a lead actress in A Mero Hajur 3 (2019) alongside Anmol K.C..

== Filmography ==
Key
| † | Denotes films that have not yet been released |

| Year | Film | Role | Notes | Ref(s) |
|---|---|---|---|---|
| 2017 | A Mero Hajur 2 | —N/a | Producer only | |
| 2019 | A Mero Hajur 3 | Arya | Debut film, also producer | |
| 2022 | A Mero Hajur 4 | Arya Maharjan | Also producer | |
| 2023 | Ek Bhagavad Ra Ek Gita | Gita | Also Producer | |
| 2026 | Paral ko Aago | Gauthali | | |
| 2026 | Baa - Ek Yoddha | Prashi | | |

== Awards ==
| Year | Award | Category | Work | Result | Ref(s) |
|---|---|---|---|---|---|
| 2020 | Kamana Film Award | Best Debut Actor (Female) | A Mero Hajur 3 | Won | |
| 2020 | NEFTA Film Award | Best Debut Actor (Female) | A Mero Hajur 3 | Won | |
