= A Mero Hajur 4 =

2022 Nepalese film directed by Jharana Thapa

- Theatrical release poster
- Nepali: ए मेरो हजुर ४
- Directed by: Jharana Thapa
- Story by: Jharana Thapa; Chetan Gurung
- Produced by: Sunil Kumar Thapa
- Starring: Anmol KC; Suhana Thapa; Salon Basnet
- Edited by: Mitra D. Gurung Sound Design,Dolby Atmos Mix: Uttam Neupane,CAS
- Release date: April 14, 2022 (Nepal)
- Running time: 138 minutes
- Country: Nepal
- Language: Nepali
- Budget: रू1.5 crore (US$97,000)
- Box office: est.रू6.20 crore (US$400,000) - रू7 crore (US$450,000)

A Mero Hajur 4 (Nepali: ए मेरो हजुर ४) is a 2022 Nepali film directed by Jharana Thapa under the banner of Suhana Entertainment and Sunil Thapa Production. The film was released on April 14, 2022 in Nepal alongside Indian film K.G.F: Chapter 2. The film was made with an estimated budget of around 1.5 million. The movie met with mixed to negative reviews from critics but positive response from audience. The film was a commercial success at the box office collecting more than 7 million Nepali rupees.Filmmakers expressed grievances towards distributors for lowering the film's showtimes in order to provide more screens for K.G.F: Chapter 2.

== Plot ==
Prem (Anmol K.C) finds a dog outside and adopts it not knowing it belongs to a girl named Aarya (Suhana Thapa). Prem and Aarya fight over the dog and eventually fall in love with each other. Aarya's father object to the relationship. Prem's father tries to convince Aarya's parents but Aarya's father push him away causing Prem to slap him in anger. Aarya slaps Prem for slapping her father and break their relationship. After breakup, Aarya goes to Dhaka complete her post graduation. Prem tries to stop her but she doesn't listen to him and leaves. Aarya's departure leaves Prem into depression and eventually gets admitted into a mental hospital. After finding about Prem, Aarya returns to him and helps him recover. After recovering, Prem convinces Aarya's father for their marriage. Aarya goes to Dhaka to complete her studies and returns on the day of their marriage. Aarya gets into plane crash and dies. The film ends with Prem dying after seeing Aarya's dead body and his body lies near Aarya's dead body.

== Cast ==
- Anmol K.C. as Prem Upadhyay
- Suhana Thapa as Aarya Maharjan
- Arun Adhikari
- Saroj Khanal as Krishna Prasad Upadhyay, Prem's father
- Rabi Giri
- Pradip Raut
- Narendra Singh Dhami

== Reception ==
The film received mostly negative reviews from critics.

Abhimanyu Dixit from The Kathmandu Post commented: the director Jharana Thapa has refused to learn from the past (referring to the earlier films she directed, A Mero Hajur 2 and A Mero Hajur 3), where he criticized the story of a film. He has only praised two scenes from the entire film, and criticized everything else.

Rina Moktan from Kantipur praised Suhana Thapa, Salon Basnet, and Ravi Giri for their performances, while criticized Anmol K.C.'s acting skills. She also criticized the overall plot of the film by commenting "Only those viewers who believe Nepali films deserve to be adored will stay for the entire 2 hours, 35 minutes of this movie."

== Soundtrack ==
| No. | Title | Singer(s) | Length |
|---|---|---|---|
| 1. | "Phoola Ko Thunga" | Sugam Pokharel, Ashmita Adhikari | 4:57 |
| 2. | "Timi Ra Ma" | Uday Raj Poudel | 4:09 |
| 3. | "Suntala" | Nishan Bhattarai, Melina Rai | 4:13 |
| 4. | "Bhag Bhag Na De Aba Dherai Dhak" | Sudeep Bhandari (GBOB) | 1:47 |
| Total length: | | | 15:06 |
