= Ma Timi Bina Marihalchhu =

- Directed by: Dayaram Dahal
- Story by: Bikash Raj Acharya; Brajesh Khanal; Sushmita K.C.
- Produced by: Anmol K.C.
- Starring: Bhuwan K.C. Jharana Thapa; Sushmita K.C. Kamal Krishna Poudel; Sushila Rayamajhi; Arpan Singh; Sapana Shrestha; Vijay Deuja; Laya Sangraula
- Release date: 25 June 2008
- Running time: 138 Mins
- Country: Nepal
- Language: Nepali

Ma Timi Bina Marihalchhu is 2008 film about a soldier who risks his life to save his country. This film features Bhuwan K.C., Jharana Thapa and Sushmita K.C. in the lead roles.

== Plot ==
Bhuwan was going home after his duty in the army while he was driving his car breaks while he tries to fix it a lady appears in his car. Then Kajal scares Bhuwan Kc in his army office than he finds her than she tells the story about herself. After hearing the story about herself than Bhuwan decides to marry her. After the marriage Bhuwan goes on a mission to rescue a police lady who has been kidnapped. While rescuing her Bhuwan gets kidnapped by them. Then, he gets rescued by the army after that he get awarded. While Bhuwan was away his wife gets treated badly by Bhuwan's stepmom who was only interested in his property not in Bhuwan.

== Cast ==
- Bhuwan K.C. as Surya
- Jharana Thapa as Kajal
- Sujal Nepal as Raju(child actor)
- Sushmita K.C.
- Kamal Krishna Poudel
- Sushila Rayamajhi
- Arpana Singh
- Sapana Shrestha
- Vijay Deuja
- Laya Sangraula
- Daxata Karki as 'Dancing Gal'
- Subish Lacoul as an invisible dancer'

== Soundtrack ==
No.	Title	Singer(s)	Length
1.	"Ma Timi Bina Marihalchhu"	Ananda Karki, Anju Panta	6:58
2.	"Ruda Rudai Hasna Paye"	Sila Bista, Deepak Limbu	5:43
3.	"Kaha Ho Kaha"	Ananda Karki	5:41
4.	"Nasha Lagyo Mali Mayako"	Udit Narayan, Sanjeevani	3:47
5.	"Noni Noni"	Puspa Paudel	4:16
Total length:			26:25

== Awards ==
Year	Award	Category	Nominated work	Result
2008	KTV Film Award	Best Movie	Ma Timi Bina Marihalchhu	Won
