= Salon Basnet =

Nepali actor (born 1991)

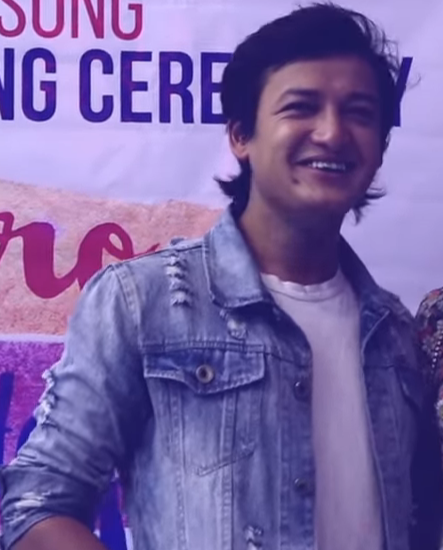
- Basnet at press meet of A Mero Hajur 2 (2017)
- Born: 23 March 1991 (age 35); Kathmandu, Nepal
- Occupation: Actor
- Spouse: Karishma KC

Salon Basnet (Nepali: सलोन वस्नेत; born 23 March 1991) is a Nepalese actor and model known for his work in Nepali cinema. He started his career in Nepali Film Industry as a child actor with a film, Nepali Babu in 1999. He rose to fame with super-hit Nepali films such as Hostel (2013), Yatra: A Musical Vlog (2019), and Gajalu (2016).

== Personal life ==
Basnet was born on 23 March 1991 in Kathmandu, Nepal, to Meena Basnet and Shovit Basnet. His father, Shovit Basnet is also a renowned actor, producer, and director of his time. After four years of relationship, Basnet married Karishma KC in 2022.

== Career ==
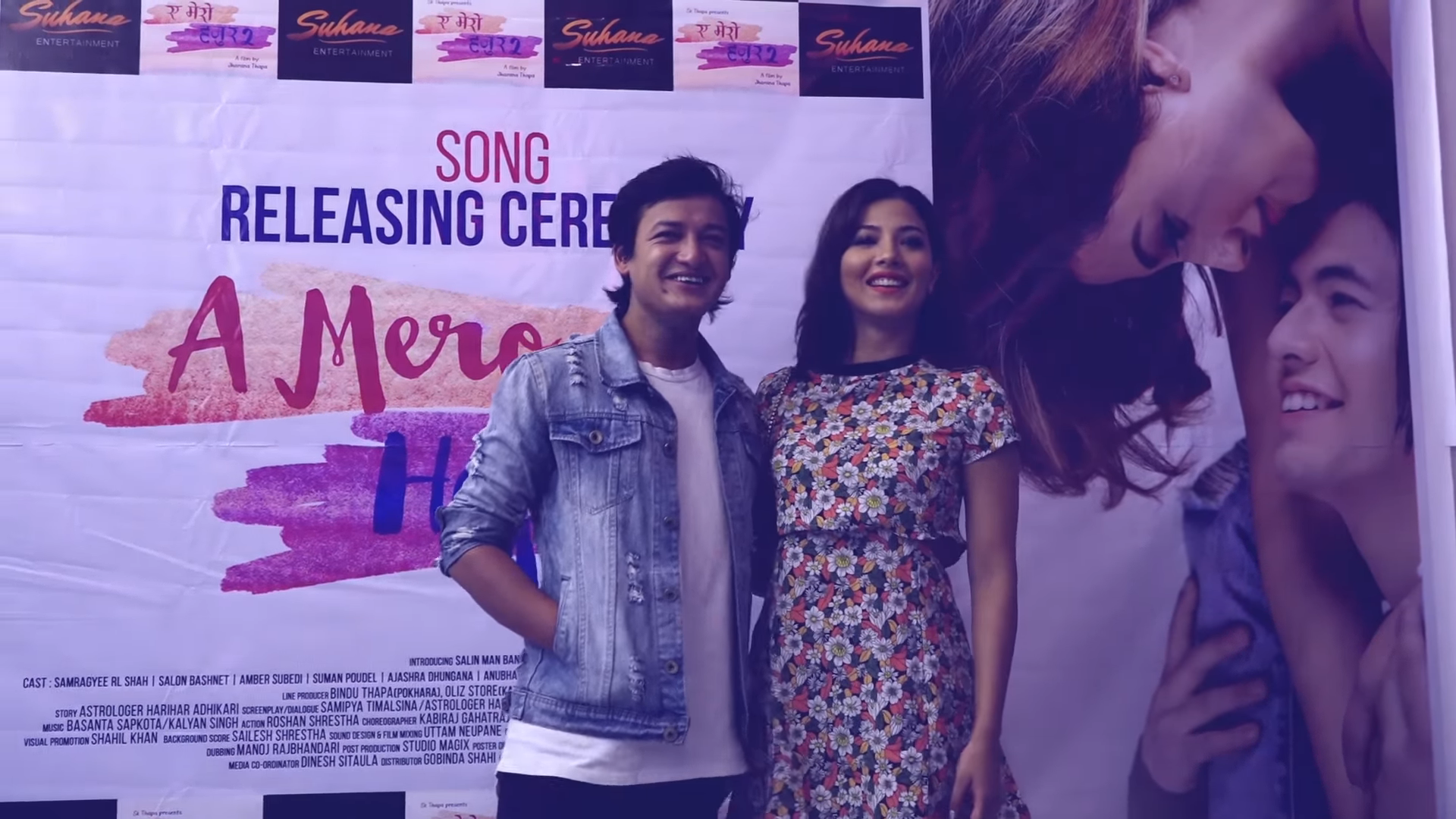
Basnet with Samragyee RL Shah, promoting A Mero Hajur 2 (in 2017)

Basnet debuted in 1999 as a child artist in a film, Nepali Babu. He played in many other movies as a child artist, such as Aafanta (1999), Dhukdhuki (2000), Pinjada (2001), and Hami Tin Bhai (2004). The first film he played as an adult was Hostel (2013). He then worked in number of commercially successful films including A Mero Hajur 2, A Mero Hajur 3, and A Mero Hajur 4.

== Filmography ==
Key
†	Denotes films that have not yet been released

Year	Title	Role	Notes	Ref(s)
1999	Nepali Babu	Raju	Debut film	
1999	Aafanta			
2000	Dhukdhuki			
2001	Pinjada			
2004	Hami Tin Bhai	Hari		
2013	Hostel	Hari Jung Shahi 'Junge'		
2015	Luv Sab			
2016	Gajalu	Tanke		
2017	A Mero Hajur 2	Jay		
2017	Radhe	Radhe's Friend		
2017	Mela	Dipesh		
2018	Babu Kanchha			
2018	Jai Bhole	Shamsher		
2019	Hajar Juni Samma	Nishant		
2019	A Mero Hajur 3	Hari		
2021	Dada Ko Bar Pipal			
2022	A Mero Hajur 4	Hari		
2022	December Falls			
2022	Meelan			
2023	Hridaya Bhari †		Filming	

== Accolades ==
Year	Award	Category	Nominated work	Result	Ref(s)
2015	NEFTA Film Awards	Best actor in supporting role	Aawaj	Won	
2018	Dcine Awards	Best actor in supporting role	A Mero Hajur 2	Won	
