= Hostel (2013 film) =

- Theatrical release poster
- Directed by: Hem Raj BC
- Written by: Hem Raj BC
- Produced by: Sunil rawal
- Starring: Anmol K.C. Salma Shrees; Gaurav Pahari; Salon Basnet; Sunil Rawal
- Cinematography: Hari Humagain
- Edited by: Surendra poudel
- Music by: The shadows
- Production company: Durgish films
- Release date: 30 June 2013
- Country: Nepal
- Language: Nepali

Hostel is 2013 coming of age comedy Nepali film directed by Hem Raj BC. and produced by Sunil Rawal under Durgish Films. The film launched second generation faces in the film industry including Anmol K.C., Gaurav Pahadi, Salon Basnet, Prakriti Shrestha, Rishta Basnet. The film tells the story of three friends and their life as a student in medical college.

The film met with positive response from critics and audience and was a huge success at the box office and went on to become one of the highest grossing Nepali films then. The film had two spiritual sequels, Hostel 2 which was big success as well and Hostel 3, set to be released in 2024

== Cast ==
- Anmol K.C. as Aditya Bikram Rana
- Prakriti Shrestha as Shristy
- Gaurav Pahadi as Shree
- Salon Basnet as Hari Jung Shahi 'Junge'
- Rista Basnet as Erica
- Sunil Rawal as Warden

== Critical response ==
After the successful screening of Saayad, Sunil Rawal launched new faces through this film, who were highly appreciated among public.

On successful screening of hostel crew members of hostel celebrated Success party on celebration of its 51-day on theater. Many faces of media personalities were seen in the party.

== Accolades ==
List of awards and nominations
| Ceremony | Category | Recipient | Result |
|---|---|---|---|
| CG kamana film awards | Best new film | Sunil Rawal | Nominated |
| CG kamana film awards | Best story | Sunil Rawal | Nominated |
| CG kamana film awards | Best script | Hem Raj BC | Nominated |
| CG kamana film awards | Best new director | Hem Raj BC | Nominated |
| CG kamana film awards | Best new actor (male) | Anmol K.C. | Nominated |
| CG kamana film awards | Best new actress | Prakreeti Shrestha | Won |
| CG kamana film awards | Best new actress | Rista Basnet | Nominated |
| CG kamana film awards | Best actor in comedy | Salon Basnet | Nominated |
| CG kamana film awards | Best supporting actor | Gaurav Pahadia | Won |
| CG kamana film awards | Best musician | Swoopnil Sharma | Nominated |
| CG kamana film awards | Best choreographer | Hem Raj BC | Nominated |
| CG kamana film awards | Best dialogue | Hem Raj BC | Nominated |
| CG kamana film awards | Best sound mixing | Uttam Neupane | Nominated |
| CG kamana film awards | Best background music | Rohit Shakya | Nominated |
| CG kamana film awards | Best action direction | Aastha Maharjan | Nominated |
| CG kamana film awards | Best cinematography | Hari Humagain | Won |
| CG kamana film awards | Best editing | Surendra Poudel | Won |
| CG kamana film awards | Best makeup | Amrit Marahatta | Nominated |

== Soundtrack ==
| Track name | Singer(s) | Released | Duration | Notes |
|---|---|---|---|---|
| Turu Turu | Hem Lama | 2013 | 3:21 | featured in Hostel sequel, Hostel returns as well |
| Dhaleko gham | Swapnil Sharma | 2013 | 4:59 | |
| I Don't Wanna Let You Go | Bibash Chhetri, Sazza Dahal, Sugam Pokharel | 2013 | 3:14 | |

== See also ==
- Anmol K.C.
- Prakreeti Shrestha
- Hostel returns
- Saayad
