= Prakriti (disambiguation) =

Prakriti may refer to:

- Prakriti Kakar (born 1995), Indian singer
- Prakriti Shrestha, Nepalese film actress
- Pancha Prakritis, five supreme manifestations of the divine feminine in Hinduism
