= Hostel Returns =

- Promotional poster
- Directed by: Suraj Bhusal
- Written by: Sunil Rawal
- Screenplay by: Suraj Bhusal; Santosh Lamsal
- Produced by: Sunil Rawal
- Starring: Najir Hussain; Swastima Khadka; Uttam Neupane; Sushil Shrestha; Sunil Rawal jenny shrestha
- Cinematography: Hari Humagain
- Edited by: Dirgha Khadka
- Music by: Songs: Swopnil Sharma; Background Scores: Shailesh Shrestha; Rohit Shakya
- Production company: Durgish Films
- Release dates: 19 August 2015 (Australia); 21 August 2015 (Nepal)
- Country: Nepal
- Language: Nepali
- Budget: रु 9 Million
- Box office: रु 20,550,450

Hostel Returns is a sequel to the 2013 Nepali film Hostel and is based on the hostel life of typical engineering students in Nepal. Directed by Suraj Bhusal and produced by Mr Sunil Rawal, Sunil himself plays the role of Hostel Warden in the movie. In addition, young actors and actresses viz Sushil Shrestha (Pratap), Sashi Shrestha (Seema), Nazir Hussain (Rameshwor), Swostima Khadka (Elina) etc. are starred in the movie.

== Plot ==
Hostel Returns is a 2015 Nepalese teen romance film directed by Suraj Bhusal and produced by Sunil Rawal under Durgish Films banner. This film is a sequel to 2013 film Hostel and is based on the hostel life of civil engineering students.which is inspired from bollywood movie 3 idiots. Despite being the sequel of Hostel, no previous stars are cast on this film. In fact, the film stars new faces of Najir Hussain, Sushil Shrestha, Sashi Shrestha, Swastima Khadka, Sushil Sitaula, jenny shrestha and Abhaya Baral.

The film was originally set to release on 8 May 2015 but due to devastating Nepal earthquake that struck on 25 April 2015, the crew postponed the date of release. It was then released on Bhadra 4 (August 21, 2015).

== Cast and crew ==
- Sushil Shrestha as Pratap Raj Bhandari
- Abhaya Baral as Kumar Prasai
- Sushil Sitaula as Sameer Bhatta
- Najir Hussain as Rameshwor Yadav
- Sashi Shrestha as Seema Joshi
- Swastima Khadka as Elina Khadka
- Rajendra Moktan Colorist
- Uttam Neupane Sound mixer, Sound designer
- Sunil Rawal as warden
- jenny shrestha as pratikshya sharma
- Deeya Maskey as teacher (Special appearance)

== Music ==
=== Track listing ===
| No. | Title | Artist(s) | Length |
|---|---|---|---|
| 1. | "Drink drank drunk" | Swopnil Sharma; Sanjay; Nawaj Ansari | 2:46 |
| 2. | "Babu Ta Bannu" | Swopnil Sharma | 3:11 |
| 3. | "Mussuka Hasne" | Swopnil Sharma | 3:42 |
| 4. | "Adhi Adhi Tukra" | Swopnil Sharma |
| 5. | "Feri Aucha" | Swopnil Sharma |
| 6. | "Turu Turu (remake)" | Swopnil Sharma | 4:21 |
| 7. | "Background Vocals" | Biraj Gautam |

== Promotion ==
Promotion of Hostel Returns was different from other promotions. Publicity designer of movie is Dipesh Khadka. The film crew launched live promo with the actors acting live in front of students in various colleges. The team targets students as audience since the film is itself about engineering students and their parents.

== Reception ==
The premiere show of Hostel Returns was held in Australia on 19 August 2015. The film was then released in Nepal on 21 August 2015. Hostel returns had an aggressive opening. The occupancy of the show was 80%, beating Bollywood film, All Is Well.

The film earned 1 crore 1 lakh gross in just two days.

== Sequel ==
A sequel titled Hostel:3 was release in 2025. The film received mixed to positive reviews from critics and earned over 40 million NPR in the first weekend.[citation]

== See also ==
- Hostel (2013 film)
- Saayad
- Nepal earthquake
