= Intu Mintu Londonma =

2018 Nepali film directed by Renasha Bantawa Rai

- Film poster
- Directed by: Renasha Bantawa Rai
- Written by: Renasha Bantawa Rai
- Produced by: Prabhu S.J.B. Rana; Prajjwal S.J.B. Rana
- Starring: Samragyee R.L. Shah; Dhiraj Magar; Saruk Tamrakar
- Cinematography: Shailendra Pradhan
- Edited by: Rohhan Rye
- Music by: Hercules Basnet, Swoopna Suman (singer), Tsujil Karmacharya
- Production company: EyeCore Films
- Distributed by: EyeCore Films
- Release date: 2018
- Running time: 144 minutes
- Country: Nepal
- Language: Nepali
- Budget: 2.5 Crores (USD$ 250,000)
- Box office: 8 crores (USD$ 800,000)

Intu Mintu Londonma is a 2018 Nepalese romantic drama film, directed and written by Renasha Bantawa Rai. The film was produced by Prabhu S.J.B. Rana and Prajjwal S.J.B. Rana under the banner of EyeCore Films. The film stars Samragyee R.L. Shah, debutant Dhiraj Magar and Saruk Tamrakar in the lead roles.

The film received mixed response from critics who praised its cinematography, music and performance especially of debutant Dhiraj Magar. It was criticised for its routine story and screenplay. Audience response was positive. The film sold above average at the box office, and had the year's best opening. The film became one of the highest grossing Nepali films that year.

== Synopsis ==
The film opens with a song "Londonma" where Ishan (Dhiraj Magar) is singing. Meera (Samragyee R.L. Shah) Is shown shopping with his friend Newson (Bibek Limbu). After shopping they go to meet Meera's friend Katherine (Jemima Toms). Katherine invites Meera to an engagement party and reveals she is engaged to Ishan. A flashback shows hw Meera and Ishan fell in love and then separated because Meera was moving. Ishan and Meera meet again and love blossoms. Meera's father sensed what was happening and takes Meera to Nepal and arranges her marriage to an Army officer - Aakash (Saruk Tamrakar). Aakash likes Meera, but Meera cannot forget Ishan. Ishan attends her engagement announcement. Ishan is angry with Meera because she refuses to elope. Aakash senses something wrong and tries to show Ishan he is right for Meera but fails.

On the wedding day Meera and Ishan elope, but again return because Meera again refuses. Akash starts to beat up Ishan, until Meera stops him. Aakash is shocked to see the for Ishan in Meera's eyes. Meera confesses her love for Ishan and Aakash helps them.

The film ends with a Song "I am Intu, She is Mintu".

== Cast ==
- Samragyee R.L. Shah as Meera / Mintu
- Dhiraj Magar as Ishan / Intu
- Saruk Tamrakar as Aakash
- Ruby Rana
- Aditya Jha

== Soundtrack ==
No.	Title	Singer(s)	Length
1.	"Thahai Bhayena"	Swoopna Suman (singer)	4:46
2.	"Jurayo Jurayo"	Rajesh Payal Rai, Melina Rai	3:45
3.	"Udayo Hawale"	Hercules Basnet, Nikhita Thapa	4:05
4.	"London Ma"	Tsujil Karmacharya	4:42
5.	"I'm Intu, She's Mintu"	Tsujil Karmacharya, Shreya Sotang	4:17
