= Almoda Rana Uprety =

Nepalese singer (born 1988)

Almoda Rana Uprety अलमोडा उप्रेती
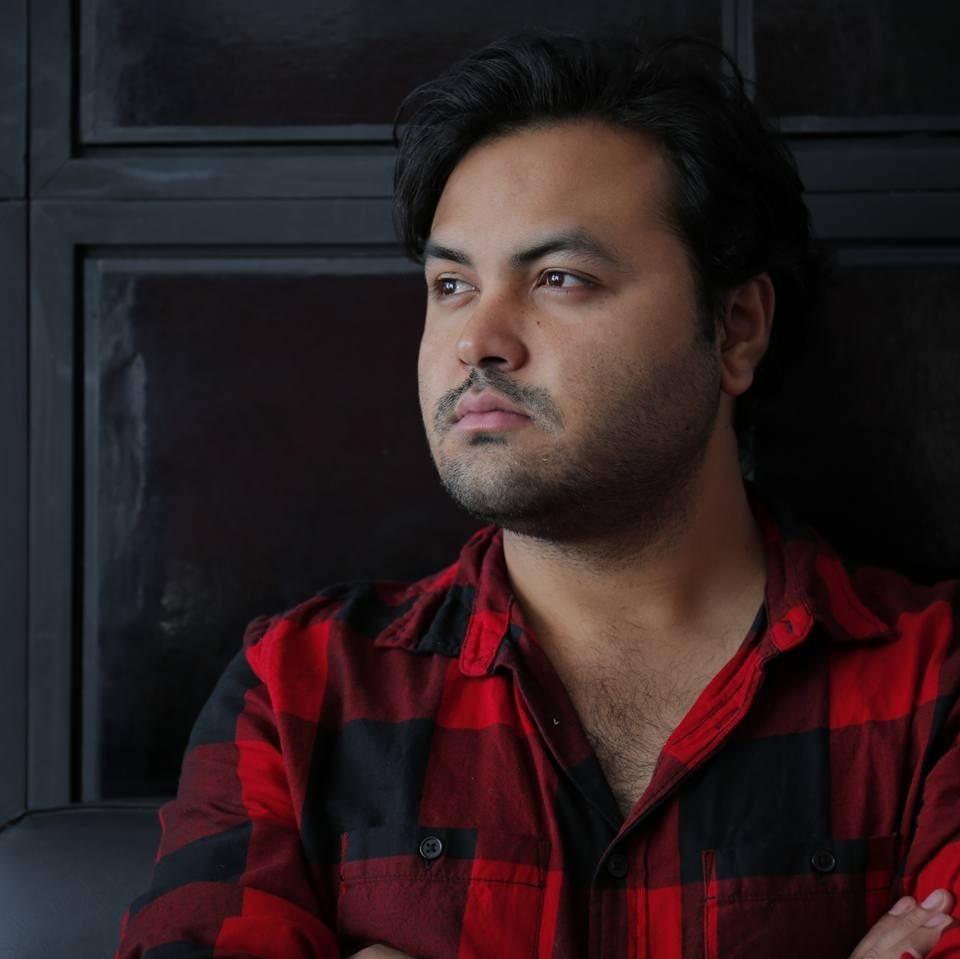

Background information
- Born: 5 February 1992 (age 34); Nepal
- Origin: Nepal
- Genre: Pop
- Occupations: Singer, songwriter, composer, music producer, music arranger
- Instruments: Vocals, piano
- Label: Almoda Rana Uprety
- Website: https://www.almodaranauprety.com/

Almoda Rana Uprety is a Nepalese singer known for his work in Nepali music industry. He has released songs such as "Funtastic (Pani Paryo)", "Kaile Vetne Khai", "Timi Ma Sanga", Kaile Vetne Khai 2 (Nyasro)" and "Jyanle Timlai".

== Early life ==
Almoda started his career after being the second runner up in a national level broadcast singing competition Nepal Star – 2005 at the age of 16. He achieved a music degree from SOAS, University of London and Kathmandu University specializing in ethnomusicology.

== Discography ==
| Year | Release date | Song | Note |
|---|---|---|---|
| 2014 | 19 October | "Tihar Song" | The most played song during Tihar festival feat. Axata, Nawaj Ansari and Roland Carbety Miclee |
| 2016 | 24 March | "Funtastic" (Pani Paryo) | Viral Song of 2016 |
| 2016 | 1 August | "Always with you, Always with me" | Ncell Axiata Anthem |
| 2016 | 26 September | "Changa Chet" | Dashain Song |
| 2016 | 22 November | "Kaile Vetne Khai (K Bachaula Khai)" | Over 6m plays – Most Played Song |
| 2017 | 16 November | "Timi Ma Sanga" | Love Song |
| 2017 | 12 April | "Maya Maya" | Diarry movie |
| 2017 | 20 July | "Ye Daju Nasamau" | Chhakka Panja 2 movie |
| 2017 | 10 November | "Dil Ko Bhittaima" | |
| 2017 | 29 December | "Kamaar Ko Tattoo" | |
| 2017 | 31 December | "Yeti Yeti Pani" | Kri movie |
| 2018 | 15 February | "Taraharu (Barsadachhan)" | Love ballad |
| 2018 | 16 February | "Dhuk Dhuki" | Kri movie |
| 2018 | 27 September | "Thegana Veityo" | ft. Mahesh, Zanak & Sujata |
| 2018 | 23 November | "Chappal Padkaudai" | ft. Wild Ripperz Crew & Kristina Gurung |
| 2019 | 10 January | "Danda Pari (Mero Sano Gaun Chha)" | Over 1m plays |
| 2019 | 8 March | "Sun Ka Bala (Suwa)" | A Nepali Deuda Song, ft. Mr RJ (Rajendra Bhaat) & Sita |
| 2019 | 22 March | "Samaya" | ft. Kristina Gurung |
| 2019 | 5 April | "Roila Song (Roila Hannu Parcha)" | Inspired from musical tour in Chitwan |
| 2019 | 15 October | "Garo VO" | ft. Dilip Rayamajhi & Rahul Shah |
| 2019 | 5 December | "Khai Aja K Vo" | |
| 2019 | 29 December | "Kaile Vetne Khai 2 (Nyasro)" | Over 11m plays - most played song of 2019 - 2020. ft. Najir Husen, Shilpa Maskey & Bikash Lamichhane |
| 2020 | 5 March | "Jwai Chaiyo" | ft. Nep-Dreamerz |
| 2020 | 10 September | "Jyanle Timlai" | Over 1m plays ft. Dayahang Rai, Barsha Siwakoti & Buddhi Tamang |

=== Features ===
Featured song

| Year | Release date | Song | Artist | Note |
|---|---|---|---|---|
| 2017 | 11 August | Asha Xa | Rap Mechanics (Sniper AV & Balle) | |
| 2017 | 29 December | Instagram Ko Photo (feat. Almoda & Bses Slwl I ) | BiV1 | |
| 2019 | 26 July | O Sathi | DJ Atul | Song regarding raising women raping case, ft. DJ Atul |

=== Cover songs ===
| Years | Release date | Song | Note |
|---|---|---|---|
| 2013 | 21 October | "Parelima" | |
| 2015 | 15 March | "Chanda Tare – Yes Boss !" | |
| 2016 | 20 February | "Bola Bola" (Mash up) | Mashup song |
| 2016 | 9 May | "Junta Lagyo/Somewhere" | feat. Ayuska |
| 2016 | 17 June | "Sayau Thunga" | Tribute to the late Amber Gurung |
| 2017 | 3 February | "Hamro Nepal Ma" (parody) | A parody indicating Nepal situation at that time |
| 2017 | 19 May | "Jeena/Closer/Parelima" | Mashup song |
| 2017 | 14 June | "Mai Chhori/Cheap Thrills" | feat. Ayuska (mashup song) |
| 2017 | 14 July | "Kafal/Kamla" | feat. Zanak (mashup song) |
| 2017 | 1 December | "Isharale/Channa Mereya" | feat. Mandira (Mashup song) |
| 2018 | 22 March | "Sajan Morey" | feat. Sujata (based on Raag Jog) |
| 2019 | 23 August | "Pahelo Junia / Aaudai Jadai" | Mashup song |
| 2020 | 27 February | "Tujhe Kitna Chahein / Memories / Nyasro" | Mashup song |
| 2020 | 19 May | "Chulesima" | |

== Filmography ==
| Year | Title | Notes |
|---|---|---|
| 2015 | Jerry | Music arranger |
| 2015 | Resham Filili | Film score, music arranger, remix |
| 2016 | Dreams | Music arranger |
| 2016 | Junge | Music director, composer |
| 2016 | Gajalu | Music arranger |
| 2016 | Chhakka Panja | Music aArranger |
| 2017 | Ghampani | Music arranger |
| 2017 | Diarry | Singer, music arranger |
| 2017 | Chhakka Panja 2 | Singer, music arranger |
| 2018 | Kri | Singer, music arranger, composer |
| 2020 | Hunger (भोक) Short Film | Film Score A thriller short film about COVID 19 lockdown. |

== Social contribution ==
| Year | Release date | Contribution | Details |
|---|---|---|---|
| 2015 | 15 October | Anthem song "Kina Udcha Sabunman (How can Sabunman Fly?)" | – Awareness song for washing hand with Help Nepal Today Organization. – Creative Conscience Award 2016 Winner, UK |
| 2016 | 21 October | Anthem song "Condom Song" | – National AIDS & STD awareness song, Nepal. – We for Change collaboration with National Center for AIDS and STD Control, Ministry of Health, Govt. Of Nepal and MTV Staying Alive |
| 2020 | 10 March | Global Handwashing song, COVID-19 Awareness | COVID-19 Awareness |

== Awards ==
Almoda has been awarded with:

- A NEFTA Award for the movie Jerry
- Hits FM Awards for Best Pop Vocal Performance for Funtastic (Pani Paryo)

After releasing Pani Paryo he has been awarded and nominated at some awards and this song was Nepal's most streamed song of 2016.
