= Ruby Rana =

Nepalese model, actress (born 1992)

- रुबी राणा
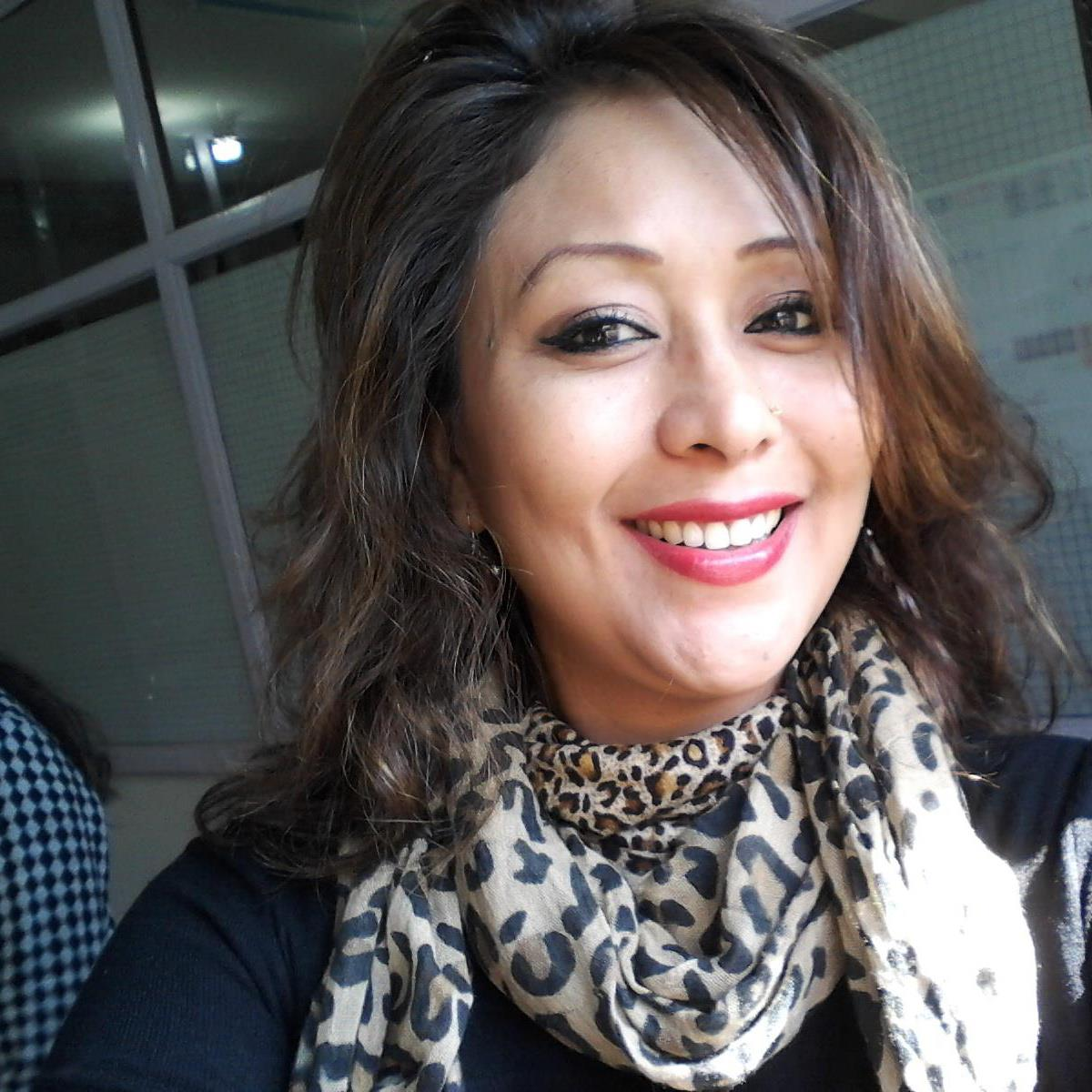
- Rana in 2013
- Born: 22 September 1972 (age 54); Kathmandu, Nepal
- Occupations: Model, actress, entrepreneur
- Height: 1.71 m (5 ft 7 1/2 in)
- Spouse: Prajaya Bikram Shah (m. 1996)
- Beauty pageant titleholder
- Title: Miss Nepal 1994; Miss Birgunj 1994
- No. of films: Intu Mintu Londonma, Hasiya
- Hair color: Black
- Eye color: Brown
- Major competitions: Miss Nepal 1994; Miss world 1994

Ruby Rana (born 1972) is a Nepalese model, actress and beauty pageant title holder. She was crowned the first ever Miss Nepal in 1994. She competed for the Miss Nepal title after winning the title of Miss Birgunj in 1994. She has also acted in two Nepalese films and was the judge of the first season of Mega Model, a modeling-based reality show.

== Biography ==
She was born on 22 September 1972 in Kathmandu, Nepal.

She was one of the judges of the first season of Mega Model, a Nepalese spin-off of America's Next Top Model.

She acted in the 2014 Nepalese action movie—Hasiya, alongside Rajesh Hamal, Anoop Bikram Shahi and Hema Shrestha. She also played a supporting role in the 2018 romantic movie—Intu Mintu Londonma.

== Filmography ==
=== Films ===
Year	Title	Genre
2014	Hasiya	Action
2018	Intu Mintu Londonma	Romance

=== Television ===
Year	Title	Seasons	Role	Genre
2008	Mega Model	1	Judge	Reality show

== Personal life ==
She married Prajaya Bikram Shah, an ex-army officer, in 1996.

== See also ==
- List of Nepalese models

Awards and achievements
Preceded by —	Miss Nepal; 1994	Succeeded by Sumi Khadka
