= Love You Baba =

- Directed by: Saugat Bista
- Screenplay by: Gamvir Bista
- Story by: Gajit Bista
- Produced by: Samjhana Pokharel
- Starring: Gajit Bista; Sangam Bista; Nishma Ghimire; Basanta Bhatta; Nirmal Sharma; Chandra Pant; Anmol Agrawal; Ashishma Nakarmi; Saugat Bista
- Cinematography: Divya Subedi
- Edited by: Pritam Pandey
- Release date: 12 December 2014
- Country: Nepal
- Language: Nepali

Love You Baba is a 2014 Nepali film directed by Saugat Bista. Released on December 12, 2014, the film was unsuccessful at the box office but garnered two awards at the National Film Awards (Nepal). Actress Sangam Bista received "Best Child Artist" and Bista received the "Appreciation for youngest director" award.

Guinness World Records named Love You Baba director Saugat Bista the "youngest director of a professionally made feature length film" for the film.

== Plot ==
The film is about single father Sushant's attempt to take care of his 10-year-old daughter Chanchal. Chanchal's mother died during her childbirth, and Sushant faces challenges in raising her. Sushant does anything to make his daughter happy, taking her places and buying her things she desires. The film explores the close relationship between the father and the daughter.

Nishma, who says she is a social worker, meets Chanchal and says she will help her. Through Chanchal, Nishma, who is Chanchal's maternal aunt, gets to know Sushant and they fall in love. Chanchal is admitted to the hospital after getting injured while riding a bicycle. The doctors inform Sushant that Chanchal has only three to four months left because of an illness. During a flashback, Chanchal's mother died because of her father's error. Sushant's father-in-law wants to see Chanchal but owing to anger, Sushant refuses.

== Cast ==
- Gajit Bista as Sushant
- Sangam Bista as Chanchal
- Nishma Ghimire
- Basanta Bhatta
- Nirmal Sharma
- Chandra Pant
- Anmol Agrawal
- Ashishma Nakarmi
- Saugat Bista

The film stars Gajit Bista as Sushant and Sangam Bista as Chanchal. Other members of the cast are Nishma Ghimire, Basanta Bhatta, Nirmal Sharma, Chandra Pant, Anmol Agrawal, Ashishma Nakarmi, and Saugat Bista.

== Soundtrack ==
No.	Title	Singer(s)	Length
1.	"Sundar Chha Duniya Yo"	Swaroop Raj Acharya, Nikhita Thapa	3:14
2.	"Love You Baba"	Krishna Kafle, Aayushna Nakarmi	4:16
3.	"Suseli Ko Awaz Ma"	Rajesh Payal Rai, Rajina Rimal	3:45
4.	"Gadi Nai Ho Jindagi"	Pradeep Bastola	3:48

== Production ==
Love You Baba was shot in 27 days in various places in Nepal. As the film's director, Bista directed the film's production, the cast member's acting, and the film's message to viewers. The film was Saugat Bista's directorial debut. His father, Gajit Bista, said he believed Saugat was "joking" when Saugat wanted to become a director. After the son continued to show "intense interest", Gajit Bista and other members of the film industry helped teach him about directing.

Produced by Samjhana Pokharel, Love You Baba was produced by Shree Ram Balaji Films and F.D Company. The film's screenwriters were Gajit Bista and Gamvir Bista. Love You Baba was released December 12, 2014.

== Reception and accolades ==
Love You Baba was screened in a Japanese film festival. Love You Baba "failed to hit the box office".

Guinness World Records named Love You Baba director Saugat Bista the "youngest director of a professionally made feature length film", noting that he was "aged 7 years and 340 days when Love you baba (Nepal, 2014) was released in cinemas on 12 December 2014". The previous record holder was nine-year-old Indian Kishan Shrikanth who had directed the 2006 movie C/o Footpath. Guinness World Records awarded Bista the official certificate for making the film.

At the Nepal Film Awards at the Asian Park Stadium in Doha, Qatar, Sangam Bista received "Best Child Artist" and Saugat Bista received the "Appreciation for youngest director" award.

977MAG rated the film 3.5 stars, praising the performance and screenplay and criticizing the film's songs as "not bad but could have been better" and the climax as "could have been much better". Suman Joshi of Nepali Film Reviews praised the film for being "a very beautiful movie".
