= Dayaram Dahal =

Nepalese film director

- दयाराम दाहाल
- Born: May 27, 1970 (age 56); Kavrepalanchok, Nepal
- Education: Tribhuvan University
- Years active: 1987-present
- Notable work: Thuldai, Ta Ta Sarai Bigris Ni Badri, Nepal, Ma Timi Bina Marihalchhu, Farkera Herda, Dasgaja
- Parents: Padam Prasad Dahal (father); Ghana Kumari Dahal (mother)

Dayaram Dahal (Nepali: दयाराम दाहाल; born May 27, 1970) is a Nepalese film director, producer, writer, actor, and lyricist. He was one of the country's top-paid directors during the late 1990s, earning approximately Rs. 10,00,000 per film. He directed 2007 film Nepal, which was the first Nepalese feature film partly shot in the United States. Dahal was appointed as chairman of Film Development Board of Nepal on June 4, 2020; he served as a chairman till June 3, 2022.

== Filmography ==
Key
| † | Denotes films that have not yet been released |

| Year | Film | Director | Writer | Actor | Notes |
|---|---|---|---|---|---|
| 1988 | Lahure | Chief AD | No | No | |
| 1991 | Chino | Chief AD | No | No | |
| 1993 | Dui Thopa Aanshu | Chief AD | No | Yes | |
| 1994 | Dakshina | Chief AD | No | No | |
| 1996 | Bhariya | Yes | Yes | No | Debut film as a director. |
| 1996 | Daijo | Yes | Yes | No | |
| 1998 | Dauntari | Yes | Yes | Yes | |
| 1999 | Thuldai | Yes | Yes | Yes | |
| 1999 | Chandani | Yes | Yes | No | |
| 2000 | Dhukdhuki | Yes | Yes | No | |
| 2000 | Jange | Yes | No | Yes | |
| 2001 | Ta Ta Sarai Bigris Ni Badri | Yes | No | No | |
| 2001 | Arjun | Yes | No | No | |
| 2001 | Ijjat | Yes | No | No | |
| 2003 | Anga Rakshak | Yes | No | No | |
| 2004 | Jetho Kanchho | Yes | Story | Yes | |
| 2004 | Daiva | Yes | No | Yes | |
| 2005 | Karma Yoddha | Yes | No | No | |
| 2006 | Karma | Yes | No | No | |
| 2006 | Dhurbe | Yes | No | No | |
| 2007 | Nepal | Yes | No | Yes | |
| 2007 | Bhagya Bidhata | Yes | No | Yes | |
| 2007 | Dobato | Yes | No | No | |
| 2007 | Pale Dai | Yes | No | Yes | |
| 2007 | Agni Jwala | Yes | Yes | Yes | |
| 2008 | Ma Timi Bina Marihalchhu | Yes | No | No | |
| 2008 | Kaha Chhau Kaha | Yes | No | No | |
| 2010 | Farkera Herda | Yes | Yes | No | |
| 2011 | Dasgaja | Yes | No | No | |
| 2011 | Arabpati | Yes | Yes | Yes | |
| 2012 | Mayako Barima | Yes | Yes | No | |
| 2013 | Dabab | Yes | Yes | No | |
| 2015 | Lootera | Yes | No | Yes | |
| 2017 | Karkhana | No | Dialogue | No | |
| 2017 | Rani | Yes | No | Yes | |
| TBA | Euta Manchhe Ko Maya† | Yes | No | Yes | |

== Awards ==
| Year | Award | Category | Film |
|---|---|---|---|
| 2011 | National Film Awards | Best National Awakening Film | Dasgaja |
| 2010 | National Film Awards | | Farkera Herda |
| 2008 | National Film Awards | | Ma Timi Bina Marihalchhu |
| 2007 | National Film Awards | | Nepal |
| 2001 | National Film Awards | | Ta Ta Sarai Bigris Ni Badri |
| 1999 | National Film Awards | | Thuldai |
