= Saayad 2 =

Nepali film from 2017

- Movie poster
- Directed by: Neupane Pusparaj
- Screenplay by: Neupane Pusparaj
- Produced by: Sunil Rawal
- Starring: Sushil Shrestha; Sunil Rawal
- Cinematography: Raju Bikram Thapa
- Music by: Sugam Pokharel
- Production company: Durgish Films
- Release date: 19 June 2017
- Country: Nepal
- Language: Nepali

Saayad 2 is the fourth project of Durgish Films and a sequel to the 2012 blockbuster film Saayad.

== Plot ==
The film stars Sushil Shrestha and Sharon Shrestha in lead roles. It also features Amrit Dhungana, Kushal Pandey, Sunil Rawal, Sushil Sitaula, Nisha Karki, Rubina Shrestha, and Buddhi Lal Magar. The film initially cast Sandhya K.C, Arpana Upadhyaya and Aashirman DS Joshi in lead roles but they were replaced by Sharon, Nisha Karki and Kushal Pandey, respectively.

== Cast ==
- Sushil Shrestha
- Sharon Shrestha
- Amrit Dhungana
- Kushal Pandey
- Sunil Rawal
- Sushil Sitaula
- Nisha Karki
- Rubina Shrestha
- Buddhi Lal Magar

== Soundtrack ==
No.	Title	Lyrics	Music	Singer(s)	Length
1.	"Jatinai re"	Sugam Pokharel	Sugam Pokharel	Sugam Pokharel	4:36
2.	"Najik Mero"	Kali Prasad Baskota	Kali Prasad Baskota	Sugam Pokharel	4:13
3.	"Udey Udey"	Sugam Pokharel	Sugam Pokharel	Sugam Pokharel	4:02
4.	"Dhunwa"	Kali Prasad Baskota	Kali Prasad Baskota	Sugam Pokharel	4:05
Total length:					22:18
