= Rato Tika Nidharma =

2019 Nepali romantic comedy film

- Theatrical release poster
- Directed by: Ashok Sharma
- Written by: Ashok Sharma
- Produced by: Kiran Sharma; Kriti Sharma
- Starring: Samragyee RL Shah; Ankit Sharma; Khusbu Khadka; Buddhi Tamang; Rabindra Jha
- Release date: 27 September 2019 (Nepal)
- Country: Nepal
- Language: Nepali

Rato Tika Nidharma is a 2019 Nepali romantic comedy film. The film was directed and written by Ashok Sharma, and produced by Kiran Sharma, and Kriti Sharma. It stars Samragyee RL Shah, and Ankit Sharma in the lead roles.

== Cast ==
- Samragyee RL Shah as Dristi
- Ankit Sharma as Aakash
- Khusbu Khadka
- Buddhi Tamang as Ganesh
- Rabindra Jha as Mohit

== Reception ==
Diwakar Pyakurel of OnlineKhabar wrote, "Mediocre acting and cinematography are okay because they frequently remind the audience that they should not expect much from the movie. Debutante Ankit Sharma needs a lot of training in acting and dialogue delivery if he really wants to develop a career in the industry". Sunny Mahat of The Annapurna Express wrote, "The film is ridiculously lengthy for its trite story, the screenplay is lethargic, editing flawed at various points, and continuity breaks apart frequently. As audiences, a little nostalgia is never bad but, unfortunately, Raato Tika Nidharma represents the 90s in a grim light".
