= Farki Farki =

2024 Nepalese film written & directed by Suyog Gurung

- Theatrical release poster
- Nepali: फर्की फर्की
- Directed by: Suyog Gurung
- Written by: Suyog Gurung
- Produced by: Rohit Adhikari; Om Prakash Agarwal
- Starring: Anmol K.C.; Jassita Gurung; Ravi Kafle; Samriddhi Aryal
- Edited by: Surendra Poudel
- Music by: Roman Bajracharya; Naren Limbu
- Production company: Rohit Adhikari Films
- Distributed by: Kafiya Films; Kuber Films
- Release date: May 23, 2024 (Nepal)
- Country: Nepal
- Language: Nepali
- Budget: रू4.0 crore (US$260,000)
- Box office: unknown.

Farki Farki (Nepali: फर्की फर्की) is a 2024 Nepali science fiction film written and directed by Suyog Gurung. It is produced by Rohit Adhikari and Om Prakash Agarwal, starring Anmol K.C., Jassita Gurung, Ravi Kafle, and Samriddhi Aryal. The film was released on May 23, 2024, in Nepal and several other countries including Japan. The film released simultaneously with Pujar Sarki; however, both of them did well at the box office—a rarity in the Nepali film industry.

== Cast ==
- Anmol K.C. as Madhav Singh Basnet
- Jassita Gurung as Sayera
- Ravi Kafle as Subash
- Samriddhi Aryal

== Soundtrack ==
The title song Farki Farki was released on April 27, 2024, it is composed by Roman Bajracharya. Antim Maya was released on May 3, 2024, it is composed by Naren Limbu.

No.	Title	Lyrics	Singer(s)	Length
1.	"Farki Farki"	Roman Bajracharya	Roman Bajracharya, Nikhita Thapa	3:00
2.	"Antim Maya"	Naren Limbu	Naren Limbu	4:40
Total length:				7:40

== Reception ==
The critics' opinions on the movie were largely divided. Most claimed that while it was a fresh attempt in the industry, it fell short of their expectations.
