= Batulo Jun =

- बाटुलो जुन
- Directed by: Bhuwan K.C.
- Written by: Kajal K.C.; Sarin Pokharel; Samipyaraj Timalsena
- Produced by: Jiya K.C.
- Starring: Anmol K.C.; Princy Khatiwada; Bhuwan K.C.; Garima Panta
- Production company: Super Kajal Films
- Release date: November 12, 2026 (Nepal)
- Running time: 153 minutes
- Country: Nepal
- Language: Nepali

Batulo Jun is a 2026 Nepali romantic drama film directed by Bhuwan K.C. and produced by Jiya K.C. under the banner of Super Kajal Films. Written by Kajal K.C., Sarin Pokharel, and Samipyaraj Timalsena, the film stars Anmol K.C. and Princy Khatiwada in the lead roles, alongside Bhuwan K.C. and Garima Panta.

Set in rural Nepal during the 2040s B.S., the film explores a love story challenged by class divisions and traditional social norms. It was released theatrically in Nepal on 12 November 2026.

== Premise ==
Set in rural Nepal over three decades ago in the 2040s B.S., Batulo Jun follows the romantic relationship between two individuals from contrasting economic backgrounds. As their bond deepens, they face severe opposition from rigid social hierarchies, family expectations, and societal traditions.

== Cast ==
- Anmol K.C.
- Princy Khatiwada
- Bhuwan K.C.
- Garima Panta
- Nancy Khadka
- Prakash Ghimire
- Laxmi Giri
- Sneha Bhattarai
- Amitesh Shah

== Soundtrack ==
The soundtrack of the film features songs released prior to its theatrical debut, including:

- "Batulo Jun" (Title Song)
- "Mero Man Choryou Sutukkai"

== Release ==
Batulo Jun was released in cinemas across Nepal on 12 November 2026, coinciding with Kartik 26, 2083 B.S. It also received international screenings in countries including the United Arab Emirates.
