= Kri (film) =

- Film poster
- Directed by: Surendra Poudel
- Written by: Surendra Poudel
- Produced by: Roshan KC; Elvik Sharma; Bhuwan K.C. Kamal Giri; Shree Parajuli
- Starring: Aditi Budhathoki; Anmol K.C. Anoop Bikram Shahi; Kameshwor Chaurasiya; Raju Pal
- Edited by: Nahakul Khadka
- Music by: Songs: Almoda Rana Uprety; Bishesh Pandey; Rodit Bhandari; Scores: Shailesh Shrestha; Rohit Shakya; Sound Design, Mix: Uttam Neupane CAS
- Production companies: Subas Entertainment Production; Super Kajal Films
- Distributed by: Highlights Nepal
- Release date: 9 February 2018
- Running time: 138 minutes
- Country: Nepal
- Language: Nepali
- Budget: est.रू3.5 crore (US$230,000)
- Box office: est.रू8.5 crore (US$550,000)

Kri (Nepali: कृ, lit. 'Revenge') is a 2018 Nepali romance drama action film, directed and written by Surendra Poudel, and produced by Subas Giri and Bhuwan K.C. The movie stars Aditi Budhathoki, Anmol K.C., and Anoop Bikram Shahi.

The film was released in Nepal on February 9, 2018 and for the love of god, why was it released. (Bikram Sambat 26 Magh 2074) and worldwide on February 14, 2018. While receiving absolutely worst reviews from critics, the film also didn't received praise for its cinematography, music, performance, and its original plotline. With a budget of रु 3.5 crores, it is one of the most expensive movies made in Nepal, to date.

== Plot ==
Abhay is an army recruit who spends his holidays in Nepal. Many women wish to marry him, however, Abhay is still in love with Kesar, a childhood love interest whom he has not seen in many years.

Abhay visits Kesar's village. While he is there, he adopts the alias 'Laure' to test whether Kesar will still love him without knowing his true identity. He tries to make Kesar fall in love with him. One day he decides to propose to her, however, she refuses, stating she loves another man. Abhay is heartbroken upon hearing this news and returns to Kathmandu. In a sudden turn of events, Kesar realizes that Laure is her true desire, and she goes in search of him. As they are about to meet, Kesar is unfortunately kidnapped. Abhay chases after the kidnapper but ultimately ends up in a brutal accident.

Four months later, Abhay is in hospital, and he decides to search for Kesar. Eventually, he finds Kesar's kidnaper Don and his henchmen. A fight takes place and as the villains die they tell Abhay that Kesar was raped and murdered the day she was kidnapped. Abhay kills the kidnapper. The film ends with Abhay injured, crying, and holding a piece of cloth in Kesar's last memory. A final message appears on-screen about rape cases, acting as a didactic message for the audiences.

== Cast ==
- Aditi Budhathoki as Kesar
- Anmol K.C. as Abhay (a.k.a. Laure)
- Anoop Bikram Shahi as Don
- Rohan Rai as Alex
- Kameshwor Chaurasiya as Inspector

== Production ==
=== Budget ===
Kri had a budget of 3.5 crores NPR. The star of Kri, Anmol K.C. charged 20 lakhs for the film, making him one of Nepal's highest-paid actors. As a pure vegetarian, it took Anmol one and a half years to build the muscular body to match the character.

== Release ==
The film was released on Valentine's Day 2018 (14 February 2018) and it was originally set to release during the Nepalese festival of Tihar. It collected around 75 lakhs on its first day of release and collected 2.1 crores on its second day, which is the highest single-day collection in Nepal. It collected around 6 Crores in its first week. The film ultimately grossed 8.5 crores.

== Reception ==
Kri has been labeled as one of the most-awaited Nepali films of 2018. It received mixed to positive reviews from critics and audiences. Its average rating was 6.5/10.

== Soundtrack ==
The album received positive reviews. The Song "Yeti Yeti Pani" went viral in Nepal. The song "Ukalima" faced a copyright strike from the original makers, consequently, they remade the next song "Dhuk Dhuki" and replaced it with that.

No.	Title	Singer(s)	Length
1.	"Yeti Yeti Pani"	Almoda Rana Uprety, RJ	3:43
2.	"Jani Najani Maya"	Rodit Bhandari	4:20
3.	"Dhuk Dhuki"	Almoda Rana Uprety	3:48
