= Gajit Bista =

Nepalese actor

- गजित बिष्ट
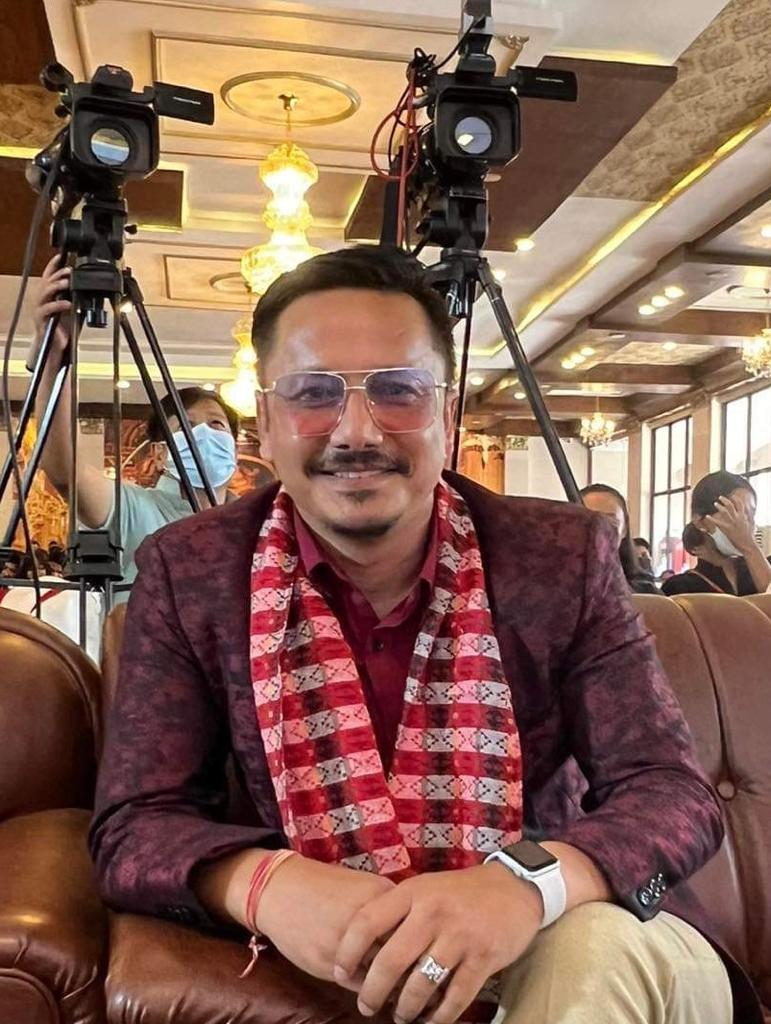
- Born: December 30; Bhojpur, Nepal
- Occupation: Nepalese actor

Gajit Bista (Nepali: गजित बिष्ट) is a Nepali actor born in Bhojpur district Nepal. He worked more than 20 Nepali movies and his career was started from TV reality show Khoji partibha ko as a participant.

== About ==
Gagit Bista is a Nepali actor. He started his acting career from a feature film and his debut movie is 'Mayaz Bar'. In last 15 years of his career, he has worked as an actor in more than 20 movies. Mayaz Bar, love you baba and love forever are some of his Movies. He worked on numerous music video. Sustari Sustari, Man Changa bho, Bedhana ko Bhel, Deurali bhake hajura, and Jaba ma eklai hunchu sajhama are the some of them.

== Awards ==
SN	Awards title	Category	Nominate title	Result
1	Nepal Africa Film Festival 2022	Best actor	Rise(Movie)	won
2	Dcine Award-2013	Best Debut Actor (Male)	Maya's Bar(Movie)	won
3	Dcine Award-2015	Best Actor in a Supporting Role (Male)	Punarjanma(Movie)	won
4	3rd Music Khhabar Music Award-2014	Best Model Music Video Awards	Maya ma ramne gara(Music Video)	won
5	3rd National Rapti Music Award-2070(BS)	Best Model Music Video Awards	Barbad bhaya(Music Video)	won
6	4th Music Khhabar Music Award	Best Music Video Models	Timile chham(Music Video)	won
7	Emp National Award-2021(AD)	Best Music Video Actor/Models	Bedana ko Bhel(Music Video)	Won

== Movies ==
SN	Movie name	Role	Release date
1	The Rise	Lead Actor	
2	Maya's Bar	Lead Actor	2013(AD)
3	Love Forever	Lead Actor	2014(AD)
4	Tori Lahure	Lead Actor	2015(AD)
5	Love You Baba	Lead Actor	2014(AD)
6	Dhauli	Lead Role	2015(AD)
7	Punar janma	Supporting Actor	2071(BS)
8	Adhakatti	Lead Actor	2015(AD)
9	Hairaan	Lead Actor	2018(AD)
10	Incounter galli	Lead role	2074(BS)
11	Hrashwo Deergha	Cast	
12	Aa Bata Aama	Lead	

== Music video ==
SN	Music video name	Publish date
1	Sustari Sustari	2011(AD)
2	Timile chham cham	2014(AD)
3	Barbad Bhaye	2012(AD)
4	Maya Ma Ramne gara	2014(AD)
5	Daiko Theki	2014(AD)
6	Lalumai	2018(AD)
6	Lalumai	2018(AD)
7	A Sani	2020(AD)
8	Bedanako Bhel	2020(AD)
9	Yo ramailo Tijama	2022(AD)
10	Raavan	2019(AD)
11	Herda Herdaima	2025(AD)

== Honors ==
SN	Organization name
1	POwwer International Media (PIM) Nepal
