= Ashish Aviral =

Nepalese singer and composer (born 1980)

Ashish Aviral आशिष अविरल
- Born: Khim Bahadur Gautam; 4 June 1980 (age 46); Baglung, Nepal
- Origin: Nepal
- Genres: Pop, modern, folk songs
- Occupations: composer, singer, songwriter, music producer, music arranger
- Instruments: vocals, piano, panche baja, madal
- Years active: 2007 – present
- Label: Raaga Records

Ashish Aviral(Nepali:आशिष अविरल ) is a Nepalese Playback Singer, music composer and music arranger. He was born on 4 June 1980 in Baglung district of Nepal.

== About ==
Ashish Aviral is a singer music composer and music arranger in Nepal. During his musical career, he has worked on hundreds of Nepalis song. "Timile Dine Maya"," Barambar", "Timi Binako Jiwan", “Maya O Maya”, “Mero Duniya Beglai Chha”, “Mitho”, “Ma Bachekai”, “Nai Malai Thahachhaina”, "Maya Luki Luki", "Karke Najar", "Jindagi Nai Bhandina", "Yo kura Gopya", “Jhamke Maya”, ”Kavi Devkota”, “Parana”, “Fulai Fula Dinchhauki”, “Chhunumunu Chhunumunu”, And “Kale Ketale are some of his popular songs. He has been awarded national awards like Bindabasini Music Award, Hit’s Fm Music Award, Kalika Music award and National Rapati Music Award, Gopikrishna National Film Award, Rashtriya Pratibha Purashkar . National poet Madhav Prasad Ghimire's song ' Yesari Hos Marana ' was composed and arranged by him and published after Ghimire's death.

== Awards ==
| SN | Awards Title | Category | Notable Work | Result |
|---|---|---|---|---|
| 1 | 7th National Rapati Music Award 2075 (BS) | Best Music Composer | song of Jindagi Nai Bhandina | Won |
| 2 | National Sadhana Music Award 2076 (BS) | Best Music Composer | song of Maya Luki Luki | Won |
| 3 | Hits FM Music Award 2068 & 2071 (BS) | Best Music Composer | songs of Maya yo Maya & Timile Kati Sajilai | Won |

== Songs ==
=== Movies Song ===
| SN | Song name | Movie name | Published Date |
|---|---|---|---|
| 1 | "Jindagi Nai Bhandina" | A Mero Hajur 3 | Mar 15, 2019 |
| 2 | "Parana" | A Mero Hajur 3 | Mar 22, 2019 |
| 3 | “Kale Ketale | Aincho paincho | July 27, 2023 |
| 4 | “Hamro Jodi | Mahajatra | Jan 15, 2024 |
| 5 | “Ye Mera Babaini” | Dui Kadam | Nov 28, 2023 |

=== Song ===
| SN | Song name | Singer Name | Published Date |
|---|---|---|---|
| 1 | "Timile Dine Maya" | Narendra Pyasi | May 31, 2021 |
| 2 | O Ho Ni | | 2023 |
| 3 | Maya Luki luki | | |
| 4 | Jyan Maya | | |
| 5 | Yo kura Gopya | | 2020 |
| 6 | Timile Dine Maya | Narendra Pyasi | |

== Honor ==
- Milaap National Personality Honor 2079
- National and Provincial Talent Honor government of Nepal (Nepali : Rastrya tatha pradeshik prtiva puruskar)
