= Radhe (2017 film) =

- Film Poster
- Directed by: Jagadishwor Thapa
- Written by: Jagadishwor Thapa
- Screenplay by: Jagadishwor Thapa
- Story by: Jagadishwor Thapa
- Produced by: Sushil Pokkharel
- Starring: Nikhil Upreti; Priyanka Karki; Salon Basnet; Ashishma Nakarmi
- Cinematography: Krishna Shrestha
- Edited by: Gautam Raj Khadka
- Music by: Arjun Pokharel
- Distributed by: Budha Subba Digital Pvt Ltd
- Release date: April 1, 2017 (Nepal)
- Running time: 2h 20m
- Country: Nepal
- Language: Nepali
- Budget: 78 lakhs
- Box office: est. 3.4 core

Radhe is a 2017 Nepalese romantic action social thriller film written and directed by Jagadishwor Thapa and produced by Sushil Pokhrel. The film stars Nikhil Upreti, Priyanka Karki, Ashishma Nakarmi and Salon Basnet in the title roles, along with Pramod Agrahari and Shishir Bhandari in supporting roles. The film tells the story of a man named Radhe who loves a woman named Priya. Then, one day Radhe leaves the village without telling anyone and joins the Nepalese army to fight for his country. The film was one of the most successful Nepalese films of 2017; it was estimated the film earned 3 cores in two days.

== Plot ==
Radhe lives with his mother and is in love with Priya, a woman from his village, but Priya's father doesn't allow Radhe to marry her due to Radhe's low financial status. Then, one day Radhe leaves the village without telling anyone. On his journey, he meets a man who allows Radhe to live with him. Radhe then joins the Nepalese army to fight for his country.

== Cast ==
- Nikhil Upreti as Radhe
- Priyanka Karki as Priya
- Salon Basnet as Radhe's Friend
- Ashishma Nakarmi
- Pramod Agrahari
- Shishir Bhandari

== Soundtrack ==
| No. | Title | Singer(s) | Length |
|---|---|---|---|
| 1. | "Malai Maaf Gara Priya" | Abhijeet Bhattacharya | 3:12 |

== Controversy ==
- While filming, the main actress Priyanka Karki fainted and remained unconscious for about 10 minutes.
