= Mega Model =

Nepalese reality television series

- Created by: Tyra Banks
- Presented by: Malvika Subba (2015 - present)(3-); Former; Sahana Bajracharya (2010); Pallavi Dhakal (2008)
- Judges: Current; Malvika Subba (3-); Kishor Kayastha (3-); Prasant Tamrakar (3-); Former; Sijan Bhattachan (1-2); Raj Bhai Suwal(1-2); Sneha Rana (2); Ruby Rana (1)
- Country of origin: Nepal
- Original language: Nepali
- No. of seasons: 4
- No. of episodes: 74

Production
- Running time: 60 minutes
- Production companies: Multimedia JSC; Image Channel

Original release
- Network: Image Channel
- Release: June 12, 2008 – present

Mega Model (often abbreviated as Image Mega Model) is a Nepalese reality television show in which a number of young Nepalese women compete against each other to win for the title of Mega Model and an opportunity to start their career in the modeling industry. The premiere is set to air on September 25, 2010 and the season finale in which the top 6 compete against each other on a stage is coming live on Image Channel.

The show's format was originally created by Indian's reality modelling show Get Gorgeous.

Mega Model has had 2 Model hosts to date. For Season 1, Pallavi Dhakal and currently, for Mega Model Season 2 is hosted by former model & beauty queen Sahana Bajracharya. Like its American version, Mega Model features a photographer and model on its judging panel, Raj Bhai Suwal, Sneh Rana and Sijan Bhattachan.

In 2015, Nagma Shrestha posted in her Facebook page that she will be the new host for the third season of Image Mega Model but later on, Malvika Subba replaced her from Episode 10.

== Cycles ==
Cycle	Premiere date	Winner	Runner-up	Other contestants in order of elimination	Number of contestants
1	June 12, 2008	Swastika Rajbhandari; Kathmandu, Nepal	Ekta Rana; Kathmandu, Nepal	Nandita Thapa Magar, Saraswati Lama, Sweta Shrestha, Binuna Chaudhary, Linda Maharjan, Shanti Lama, Renuka Suwal, Ruchi Rajkarnikar, Sabina Maharjan, Prajusha Shrestha, Zunu Gurung, Summi Mishra, Sonam La Sherpa, Lina Poudel	16
2	September 25, 2010	Rashmita Maharjan; Kathmandu, Nepal	Prakreeti Shrestha; Dolakha District, Nepal	Dristee Shakya, Pradika Shrestha, Priyanka Thapa & Pratija, Nitika Gurung, Krisha Bajracharya, Jasmine, Ayesha Shakya, Pratima, Seela Gurung, Amita Joshi, Ashmita Bhandari, Rozie Gurung, Pragati Gurung	16
3	October 11, 2015	Anugya Chand; Kathmandu, Nepal	Nitika Mahat; Kathmandu, Nepal	Saina Shrestha (quit), Maya Roka Magar & Sneha Dhakal, Anu Maharjan & Chandrika Mote, Bhumika Chaudhry & Zenisha Tamang, Meera Kachhepati & Rekha Singh, Rajiya Maharjan (returned), Prarthana Thapa, Salina Gurung, Shailee Manandhar, Sikshya Shakya	16
4	March 15, 2020	Pooja Baral; Pokhara, Nepal	Sugandha Adhikari; Kathmandu, Nepal	Anjana Niroula, Ikrina Balla, Parina Pradhan, Shreeshna Bajracharya, Albina Upreti, Anisha Waiba, Archana Khare, Bipasha Rajbanshi, Ishika Rai, Tara Basnet, Aayusha Maharjan & Anjali Thapal & Rajita Parajuli, Ashim Ranabhat	16

== Season 1 ==
Season 1 begin on June 12, 2008. The host is Pallavi Dhakal. The other judges are Ruby Rana and Sijan Bhattachan. The cast consist of 16 girls who will compete for the title of Image Mega Model.

=== Prizes ===
The winner of Mega Model wins a contract to appear in a music video, a 6-page fashion editorial spread as well as the front cover in Wave Magazine and many other prize from the sponsor.

=== Contestants ===
(ages stated are at time of contest)

Contestant	Age	Height	Hometown	Rank
Nandita Thapa Magar	15	1.58 m (5 ft 2 in)	Morang	Top 16
Saraswati Lama	20	1.60 m (5 ft 3 in)	Hetauda	Top 15
Shweta Shrestha	19	1.63 m (5 ft 4 in)	Kathmandu	Top 14
Binuna Chaudhary	18	1.58 m (5 ft 2 in)	Kathmandu	Top 13
Linda Maharjan	20	1.60 m (5 ft 3 in)	Lalitpur	Top 12
Shanti Lama	21	1.60 m (5 ft 3 in)	Kathmandu	Top 11
Renuka Suwal	18	1.63 m (5 ft 4 in)	Bhaktapur	Top 10
Ruchie Rajkarnikar	17	1.70 m (5 ft 7 in)	Kathmandu	Top 9
Sabina Maharjan	20	1.78 m (5 ft 10 in)	Lalitpur	Top 8
Prajusha Shrestha	17	1.68 m (5 ft 6 in)	Kathmandu	Top 7
Zunu Gurung	19	1.60 m (5 ft 3 in)	Kathmandu	Top 6
Summi Mishra	16	1.68 m (5 ft 6 in)	Kathmandu	Top 6
Sonam La Sherpa	19	1.65 m (5 ft 5 in)	Lalitpur	Top 6
Lina Poudel	20	1.63 m (5 ft 4 in)	Bhaktapur	2nd Runner Up
Ekta Rana	18	1.63 m (5 ft 4 in)	Kathmandu	Runner-Up
Swastika Rajbhandari	19	1.60 m (5 ft 3 in)	Kathmandu	Winner

== Season 2 ==
New host Sahana Bajracharya, with Sijan Bhattachan, Sneh Rana and returning judge Raj Bhai Suwal all join together as the second season introduces a new format. The show started with 3 weeks audition sessions and 1 week bootcamp where they reduced the 50 semi-finalists into top 14 finalists for the main competition. Every week the girls were groomed interims of posing, catwalk and communication; in the end of each week the judges evaluated the girls through their photo which they took part in a photoshoot that week. And one or more girls were eliminated every week until the top 6, who took part in a live finale show which declared the winner through the judges and the public vote.

=== In order of elimination ===
(ages stated are at time of contest)

Contestant	Age	Height	Rank
Priyanka Thapa	22	1.68 m (5 ft 6 in)	Top 14
Pratija Shakya	20	1.78 m (5 ft 10 in)	Top 13
Nitika Gurung	18	1.62 m (5 ft 4 in)	Top 12
Krisha Bajracharya	18	1.70 m (5 ft 7 in)	Top 11
Jasmine Dangol	19	1.73 m (5 ft 8 in)	Top 10
Ayesha Shakya	18	1.66 m (5 ft 5 1/2 in)	Top 9
Pratima Khatiwada	21	1.75 m (5 ft 9 in)	Top 8
Seela Gurung	17	1.73 m (5 ft 8 in)	Top 7
Amita Joshi	18	1.69 m (5 ft 6 1/2 in)	Top 6
Ashmita Bhandari	21	1.65 m (5 ft 5 in)	Top 6
Rozie Gurung	20	1.73 m (5 ft 8 in)	Top 6
Pragati Gurung	19	1.69 m (5 ft 6 1/2 in)	2nd Runner Up
Prakreeti Shrestha	19	1.63 m (5 ft 4 in)	Runner-Up
Rashmita Maharjan	20	1.72 m (5 ft 7 1/2 in)	Winner

=== Call-out order ===
Sijan's call-out order
Order	Episodes									
Order	4	5	6	7	8	9	10	11	12	
1	Ayesha	Pragati	Rashmita	Amita	Ashmita	Pragati	Pragati	Pragati	Rashmita	Rashmita
2	Pragati	Ashmita	Rozie	Pragati	Rozie	Rashmita	Rashmita	Amita	Prakreeti	Prakreeti
3	Ashmita	Krisha	Pragati	Seela	Ayesha	Prakreeti	Amita	Rozie	Pragati	Pragati
4	Amita	Rozie	Prakreeti	Ashmita	Rashmita	Seela	Rozie	Rashmita	Rozie	
5	Rozie	Nitika	Ashmita	Rashmita	Prakreeti	Ayesha	Prakreeti	Ashmita	Amita	
6	Rashmita	Amita	Amita	Rozie	Pragati	Amita	Ashmita	Prakreeti	Ashmita	
7	Jasmine	Rashmita	Ayesha	Pratima	Seela	Ashmita	Seela	Seela		
8	Pratija	Prakreeti	Krisha	Prakreeti	Amita	Rozie	Ayesha			
9	Nitika	Pratima	Seela	Jasmine	Pratima	Pratima				
10	Pratima	Ayesha	Jasmine	Ayesha	Jasmine					
11	Krisha	Jasmine	Pratima	Krisha						
12	Priyanka	Seela	Nitika							
13	Prakreeti	Pratija								
14	Seela	Priyanka								

The contestant was part of a non-elimination bottom three
The contestant was eliminated
The contestant won the competition

- Episode 1-3, featured the auditions. The top fifty girls were reduced to final fourteen who moved on to the main competition.
- In episode 4, Priyanka, Prakiti and Seela landed in the bottom three. None of them were eliminated.
- In episode 5, Pratija and Priyanka landed in the bottom two. Both of them were eliminated

=== Photo shoot guide ===
- Episode 3 Photo shoot: Casting
- Episode 4 Photo shoot: Victorian Era
- Episode 5 Photo shoot: Zodiac Signs
- Episode 6 Photo shoot: Pose with male model
- Episode 7 Catwalk: In Saree
- Episode 8 Catwalk: Designers Catwalk Show
- Episode 9 Commercial: Image Soap commercial
- Episode 11 Photo shoot: Tenzin Bhutia Designs
- Episode 12 Photo shoot: Living Magazine

== Season 3 ==
After a hiatus of 5 years it was announced that Mega Model would return in 2015. The new host/head judge is the Nepalese beauty queen Malvika Subba. The other new judges will be Nepalese photographer Kishor Kayastha and male supermodel Prasant Tamrakar. The cast consist of 16 girls who will compete for the title of Image Mega Model Season 3.

=== Auditions ===
The auditions for the third season of Mega Model has started from Dharan Audition, Pokhara Audition and the final Kathmandu Audition. Because of the recent earthquake in Nepal the auditions have been postponed to later this year. On June 29 it was announced on their official Facebook page that the postponed auditions will take place on August 5 in Pokhara and August 8, 9 and 10 in Kathmandu.

=== Prizes ===
The winner will receive NPR 200,000 prize money as well as a trip to Bangkok.

=== Contestants ===
(ages stated are at time of contest)

Contestant	Age	Height	Hometown	Rank
Saina Shrestha	20	1.71 m (5 ft 7 1/2 in)	Patan	Top 16 (Quit)
Maya Roka Magar	19	1.67 m (5 ft 5 1/2 in)	Pokhara	Top 15
Sneha Dhakal	20	1.65 m (5 ft 5 in)	Butwal	Top 15
Anu Maharjan	21	1.74 m (5 ft 8 1/2 in)	Naxal	Top 13
Chandrika Mote	21	1.70 m (5 ft 7 in)	Dharan	Top 13
Bhumika Chaudhry	21	1.67 m (5 ft 5 1/2 in)	New Baneshwor	Top 11
Zenisha Tamang	20	1.78 m (5 ft 10 in)	Nuwakot	Top 11
Meera Kachhepati	20	1.68 m (5 ft 6 in)	Bhaktapur	Top 9
Rekha Singh	21	1.68 m (5 ft 6 in)	Gyaneshwor	Top 9
Rajiya Maharjan	19	1.66 m (5 ft 5 1/2 in)	Kathmandu	Top 7
Prarthana Thapa	19	1.73 m (5 ft 8 in)	Balaju	Top 7
Shailee Manandhar	20	1.68 m (5 ft 6 in)	Dallu	Top 7
Salina Gurung	22	1.73 m (5 ft 8 in)	Pokhara	Top 7
Sikshya Shakya	20	1.72 m (5 ft 7 1/2 in)	Balaju	2nd Runner Up
Nitika Mahat	21	1.73 m (5 ft 8 in)	Samakhushi	Runner Up
Anugya Chand	19	1.68 m (5 ft 6 in)	Dhapasi	Winner

- Sneha was the Migme Wild Card Entry who made it to Top 16.

=== Call-out order ===
Malvika's call-out order
Order	Episodes							
Order	7	13	15	19	22	23	25	
1	Salina	Prarthana	Zenisha	Salina	Sikshya	Anugya	Sikshya	Anugya
2	Zenisha	Nikita	Shailee	Sikshya	Nikita	Sikshya	Anugya	Nikita
3	Anu	Chandrika	Anugya	Nikita	Anugya	Nikita	Nikita	Sikshya
4	Prarthana	Anugya	Salina	Prarthana	Salina	Salina	Salina	
5	Maya	Anu	Nikita	Anugya	Prarthana	Shailee	Shailee	
6	Shailee	Sikshya	Prarthana	Zenisha	Shailee	Prarthana	Prarthana	
7	Sneha	Salina	Sikshya	Rekha	Meera	Rekha	Rajiya	
8	Rajiya	Bhumika	Rekha	Meera	Rekha	Meera		
9	Shailee	Rekha	Meera	Bhumika				
10	Chandrika	Zenisha	Shailee	Zenisha				
11	Anugya	Meera	Anu					
12	Rekha	Shailee	Chandrika					
13	Nikita	Maya						
14	Sikshy	Rajiya						
15	Meera	Sneha						
16	Bhumika	Saina						

The contestant was nominated for the best photo of that week.
The contestant was in the bottom, but was not eliminated.
The contestant was voted back by the viewers but was eliminated again in the same episode.
The contestant was eliminated.
The contestant quit the competition.
The contestant won the competition.

- In episode 13, Saina had to quit the competition for personal reasons.
- In episode 224, nobody was eliminated.
- In the finale, Rajiya was voted back by the viewers

==== Photo shoot guide ====
- Episode 7 Photo shoot: Casting
- Episode 8 Catwalk: Walking in Cocktail dress
- Episode 14 Photo shoot: Moving Bus
- Episode 17 Photo shoot: Makeover Madness
- Episode 21, 22 Photo shoot: TVC for Healthy lifestyle
- Episode 24 Catwalk: Walking in Saree

== Season 4 ==
After a hiatus of 5 years it was announced that Mega Model would return in 2020. The new host/head judge is the Nepalese beauty queen Niti Shah. Nepalese photographer Kishor Kayastha returned as a judge along with fashion designer Bina Ghale. The cast consist of 16 girls who will compete for the title of Image Mega Model Season 4.

=== Auditions ===
The auditions for the fourth season of Mega Model has started from Dharan Audition, Pokhara Audition and the final Kathmandu Audition.

=== Prizes ===
The winner will receive NPR 500,000 prize money as well as other prizes from the sponsor.

=== Contestants ===
(ages stated are at time of contest)

Contestant	Age	Height	Hometown	Rank
Anjana Niroula	19	1.65 m (5 ft 5 in)	Jhapa	Top 16
Ikrina Balla	24	1.65 m (5 ft 5 in)	Bhaktapur	Top 16
Parina Pradhan	18	1.70 m (5 ft 7 in)	Kathmandu	Top 16
Shreesha Bajracharya	21	1.73 m (5 ft 8 in)	Lalitpur	Top 16
Albina Upreti		1.68 m (5 ft 6 in)	Hetauda	Top 12
Anisha Waiba		1.65 m (5 ft 5 in)	Bhaktapur	Top 12
Archana Kharel		1.68 m (5 ft 6 in)	Itahari	Top 12
Tara Basnet	20	1.68 m (5 ft 6 in)	Sindhuli	Top 12
Bipasha Rajbanshi		1.70 m (5 ft 7 in)	Biratnagar	Top 12
Ishika Rai	19	1.75 m (5 ft 9 in)	Kathmandu	Top 12
Aayusha Maharjan		1.73 m (5 ft 8 in)	Kirtipur	Top 6
Anjali Thapa	20	1.78 m (5 ft 10 in)	Lalitpur	Top 6
Rajita Parajuli		1.70 m (5 ft 7 in)	Itahari	Top 6
Ashim Ranahat	21	1.68 m (5 ft 6 in)	Pokhara	2nd Runner Up
Sugandha Adhikari	18	1.73 m (5 ft 8 in)	Kathmandu	Runner Up
Pooja Baral	23	1.70 m (5 ft 7 in)	Pokhara	Winner

=== Call-out order ===
Bina's call-out order
Order	Episodes				
Order	10	13	20	23	
1	Pooja	WIN	WIN	SAFE	WINNER
2	Sugandha	SAFE	SAFE	SAFE	ELIM
3	Ashim	SAFE	SAFE	SAFE	ELIM
4	Anjali	SAFE	SAFE	ELIM	
5	Rajita	LOW	SAFE	ELIM	
6	Aayusha	HIGH	SAFE	ELIM	
7	Tara	LOW	ELIM		
8	Albina	SAFE	ELIM		
9	Anisha	LOW	ELIM		
10	Ishika	SAFE	ELIM		
11	Archana	LOW	ELIM		
12	Bipasha	HIGH	ELIM		
13	Parina	ELIM			
14	Ikrina	ELIM			
15	Anjana	ELIM			
16	Shreesha	ELIM			

The contestant won Mega Model.
The contestant was a runner-up.
The contestant won the challenge.
The contestant received positive critiques and was ultimately declared safe.
The contestant received critiques but was ultimately declared safe.
The contestant received negative critiques but was ultimately declared safe.
The contestant was in the bottom.
The contestant was eliminated.
The contestant was voted back by the viewers but was eliminated again in the same episode.
The contestant quit the competition.

==== Photo shoot guide ====
- Episode 9 Photo shoot: Personal style (casting)
- Episode 13, 14, 15 Video shoot: Introduction teaser
- Episode 16, 17 Catwalk: Harajuku-style in the market
- Episode 18, 19 Photo shoot: Wall climbing
- Episode 21 Commercial: TVC for various sponsor's product
- Episode 22 Photo shoot: Luxury in golden
