= Ashishma Nakarmi =

Nepalese actress

- Born: 22 November 1988 (age 37); Kathmandu, Nepal
- Occupations: Model, actress, singer
- Years active: 2013–present
- Height: 1.64 m (5 ft 5 in)

Ashishma Nakarmi is a Nepalese actress, model and singer. She is runner-up of Miss South Asia Texas 2012 beauty pageant which was held in United States. She made her acting debut with Nepal Bhasa movie Nyalla Bya directed by Aryan Nakarmi, after the success of her first movie she got offer from director Deepa Basnet to do Nepali movie Antaraal in 2013.

== Early life ==
Nakarmi was born in Balambhu, Kathmandu, Nepal. She hails from Newar community. Her father Mana Raj Nakarmi is famous tabala badak of Nepal. She did her school and higher education from Richmond Academy, for further study she went to USA for bachelor's degree in hospitality. She did acting course in USA from Dallas, Texas. Inspired by her grandfather and father, who have been dedicated to the music field for a long time now, she learnt to play sitar at an early age of 13. Ever since, Ashishma has received classes, formal training and earned Junior Diploma in sitar. When at home, she often spends time watching Oscar nominated movies based on drama, romanticism and history. Moreover, while watching a good set of films she makes sure to learn and gain an insight on acting and film making. Launching her first album ‘Nanu’ when she was a kid, Ashishma loves tuning to classical music and sings as a chorus to her father's composition and recordings.

== Career ==
She is best known for playing the role of Timila, in Nepal Bhasha movie Nyalla Bya. She did several Nepal Bhasa movie like "Papu Madhu Ma Jhanga", "Taremam", and Matina La Ana He Du. After the success of her movie she got chance to debut in Nepali movie Antaraal in 2013. Having starred in more than a dozen of Newari movies, Ashishma Nakarmi had entered the Nepali film industry with her first movie ‘Antaraal’ in 2013. Ever since, her acting career has been progressing and bringing movies into her kitty. Ashishma has played various roles in as many as 12 movies so far and is currently pursuing her master's degree in Rural Development.

== Movies ==
Movie	Role	Language	Year	Remarks
Timi Bina Eklai		Nepali	2013	Short
Antaraal		Nepali	2013	
Timro Mayamaa		Nepali	2013	Music video
Raghav		Nepali	2014	
Kina Kina		Nepali	2014	Short
Tori Lahure		Nepali	2014	
Nabhya		Nepali	2014	
Love You Baba		Nepali	2014	
Adhakatti		Nepali	2015	
Bato Muniko Phool 2		Nepali	2016	
Papu Madhumha Ghanga		Nepali	2016	
Radhe		Nepali	2017	
Yo Mutuko		Nepali	2017	Short
Karma		Nepali	2022	

== Awards ==
List of awards and nominations
Year	Ceremony	Category	Work	Result
2016	8th Dcine Awards 2016	Best Supporting actress	Adhakatti	Won
2016	NFDC Award 2016	Best Supporting actress	Adhakatti	Nominated
