= Prakriti Shrestha =

Nepalese actress (born 1992)

- प्रकृति श्रेष्ठ
- Born: 10 September 1992 (age 34); Dolakha, Nepal
- Occupations: Model; Actress
- Years active: 2012–present
- Modeling information
- Height: 1.60 m (5 ft 3 in)
- Hair color: Black

Prakriti Shrestha (Nepali: प्रकृति श्रेष्ठ; born September 10, 1992) is a Nepalese film actress and a model. She rose to fame after her debut as a model in music video Idea Honey Bunny by Ur Style Tv. She debuted as actress in Nepali Film industry with Hostel.

== Early life ==
Prakriti Shrestha was born in Dolakha, Nepal. She later moved to Suryabinayak, Bhaktapur. She studied in Modern College of Management in Bhaktapur where she was able to win the title "Miss Modern".

== Career ==
Prakriti had participated in Mega Model season 2, where she was able to grab the position First runner up.

She was then, modeled for Evoke magazine, Fashion runway, Colors mobile and so on. She was also featured in dozens of music video starting from her debut video Ko hola tyo which was a hit, followed by Idea honey bunny, an adaptation to ringtone of Indian network that shed her fame even in India.

She got her big break in her debut film Hostel opposite Anmol K.C. which awarded her with the award - Best Debut Actress.

== Films ==
Year	Title	Role	Notes
2013	Hostel	Shristy	Lead role/Debut film
2014	Subharambha		Short film
2014	Utsav		Lead role
2015	Zindagi rocks	Rabina	Supporting role
2015	Aavash		Supporting role
2023	Bihe Pass		

== Music videos ==
Year	Song title	Artist	Notes
2012	Ko Hola Tyo	Sunil Giri	Debut music video
2012	Honey bunny		
2013	Purnimako Chandrama	Teken Dahal	
2013	Maya garchu	Santosh Lama	
2014	Phool bariko phool	Santosh Lama	
2014	Yo sansar ma	Azish Bista	
2014	Juni lai	DA PRO	featured Prakriti's husband
2014	I love you	Kamal Chhetri	
2014	Purnajanma	Teken Dahal	
2014	Fida	Janma Rai	
2014	Sansani	Bijay Timalsina	

== Awards ==
Year	Award	Category	Nominated work	Result
2013	Kamana Film Awards	Best debut actress	Hostel (2013)	Won
2014	National box office award 2071	Best new actress	Hostel (2013)	Won
2014	NEFTA Film Awards	Best new actress	Hostel (2013)	Nominated
