= Dreams (2016 film) =

- Directed by: Bhuwan K.C.
- Written by: Samipya Raj Timalsena
- Produced by: Bhuwan K.C.
- Starring: Samragyee R.L. Shah, Anmol K.C., Sandhya KC
- Cinematography: Prushottam Pradhan; Sanjaya Lama
- Edited by: Banis Shah; Milan Shrestha
- Music by: Songs: Hercules Basnet; Bishesh Pandey; Rodit Bhandari; Background scores: Shailesh Shrestha
- Distributed by: Gobind Shahi
- Release date: 4 March 2016
- Running time: 166 minutes
- Country: Nepal
- Language: Nepali
- Budget: रु 7.5 Million
- Box office: रु 40,020,350 Million

Dreams (Nepali: ड्रिम्स्) is a 2016 Nepali romantic comedy film directed by Bhuwan K.C. and starring Samragyee RL Shah and Anmol K.C. The film was inspired by the British-American film If Only.

== Plot ==
The film starts with the death of Aveer's father while trying to save a kid from a truck accident. Aveer is a millionaire and claims that he has no interest in love. Some boys chase a girl, played by VJ Sandhya KC, who successfully escapes from them and enters a basketball ring, where she encounters the boss of the gang, and they try to rape her. At the critical moment, Aveer enters the scene and saves her by defeating them.

Aveer attends his first conference in his own Fulbari Hotel and Spa in Pokhara, which his father had owned. Aveer now becomes the chairperson of the resort and spa. On the same night, Aveer and his friends drink in a bar club. Aveer sees Kavya dancing gracefully, so he tries to flirt with her. But little did he know, she isn't the type of girl who gets wooed easily. She humiliates him in front of her friends in public. They encounter each other several times, followed by words of hatred and repulsion towards each other. Surprisingly, their hatred changes into love. Kavya works as an assistant manager in his resort, and since then, they have started to learn about each other and spend time together. Kavya is kind and has a deep affection for an orphanage.

One day, Aveer had a dream where Kavya died in a car accident. He claimed that his dreams always come true. He remembers seeing his father's death in a dream, which eventually happened in reality. After seeing a doctor, he gets advice to stay away from traffic and cars, and the location where the accident had taken place in his dream.

Aveer and Kavya go to a silent place where they get cosy and eventually make out. They stay there for a couple of weeks until Aveer's depression relieves. On Kavya's birthday, they stop at a place where Kavya goes to buy roses. Kavya comes out with roses in her hands and gives one to a kid. It was the same place where Aveer had seen the car accident in his mysterious dream. Aveer realizes this, and when Kavya crosses the road, Aveer sacrifices his life and saves her from an accident.

Aveer's death takes place on Kavya's birthday. The film ends in a scene where Kavya sings a song in a crowd, which was her dream.

== Cast ==
- Samragyee RL Shah as Kavya
- Anmol K.C. as Aveer
- Sandhya KC as Alvira

== Track listing ==
No.	Title	Lyrics	Music	Singer(s)	Length
1.	"Timi Samu"	Bises Pandey	Rodit Bhandari and Bises Pandey	Rodit Bhandari and Somiya Barali	4:40
2.	"Timi Samu (Female)"	Bises Pandey	Rodit Bhandari and Bises Pandey	Somiya Barali	3:27
3.	"Ma k bhanu"	Hercules Basnet	Hercules Basnet	Hercules Basnet, Somiya Barali	3:48
Total length:					22:18

== Accolades ==
List of awards and nominations
Ceremony	Category	Recipient	Result
8th Dcine Awards 2016	Best Dress	Bina Ghale	Won
8th Dcine Awards 2016	Best Cinematography	Purshottam Pradhan	Won
8th Dcine Awards 2016	Best New Director	Bhuwan K.C.	Won
8th Dcine Awards 2016	Best New Actress	Samragyee RL Shah	Won
FAAN awards	Popular film	Dreams	Won
FAAN awards	Best Debut Actress	Samragyee RL Shah	Won
National Film Awards	Jury Award	Bhuwan K.C., Director	Won
