= Swoopna Suman =

Nepalese singer and songwriter

Swoopna Suman स्वप्न सुमन
- Also known as: Swoopna Suman
- Born: Suman Thapa; December 2, 1995 (age 30); Kathmandu, Nepal
- Genres: Pop music
- Occupations: Singer; songwriter; guitarist
- Instrument: Guitar
- Years active: 2014–present
- Member of: Swoopna Suman and The Asters
- Spouse: Jyotsna Yogi
- Website: swoopna.com

Suman Thapa (Nepali: सुमन थापा; born December 2, 1995, in Kathmandu, Nepal), better known as Swoopna Suman is a Nepali singer, songwriter, and guitarist known for his work in Nepali music industry. He began his musical career in 2012 by posting home videos on YouTube, which caught the attention of Karma Records. Suman released his first official song, K Saro Ramri Bhako, through the record label in 2014. He later joined Arbitrary Productions in 2016, releasing several original songs such as Kunai Din, Kasari Bhanu, Ma Timro, and Kurera Baschu. Suman is currently working independently and performing live shows in various locations in Nepal and internationally. His unique blend of contemporary and traditional Nepali music has earned him a massive fanbase in Nepal and abroad. He started gaining popularity after the release of his song “kasari bhanu” in 2017. Swoopna's Recent song “Radha” now has also crossed over 17 million views. His fans “swoopners” are the most incredible and loyal fans ever.

== Background ==
=== Early and personal life ===
Swoopna Suman is married to a Nepali social personality and model Jyotsana Yogi. They married on 4 May 2022 after dating for four years and have been together ever since.

=== Career and artistry ===
Swoopna wishes to perform at notable venues worldwide with his band, the Asters and his manager Rashik Bhattarai. His band, the Asters, include Ayush Bahadur Shrestha on the Keyboards, Saroj Ghimire Chhetri on the Drums, Alish KC on the bass, Asim Tamang playing the Lead Guitar and lastly Abhishek Pun on the audio. The Asters formed in 2021 and have been playing with Swoopna ever since. Their first show was on the 4th of December in 2021 in the Garage Entertainment fest.

== Discography ==
Year	Song	Notes	Ref(s)
2015	K Saro Ramri Vako		
2018	Jane Kura Nagara		
2018	Yaadma Raknechhu		
2019	Timro Aankha		
2020	Farki Herda		
2020	Thanai Vayana		
2020	Juneli Raatma		
2021	Mayalu		
2021	Najeekidai		
2021	Kaha Ma Jaau		
2022	Kasari Bhanu		
2022	Ma Timro		
2022	Baacha Vayo		
2023	Je Chhau Timi		
2023	Upahaar		

== Awards ==
Year	Award	Category	Song	Result	Ref(s)
2023	National Music Award	Best pop male vocals	Baacha Bhayo	Won	
