= A Mero Hajur 3 =

2019 Nepalese film directed by Jharana Thapa

- Theaterical Release Poster
- Nepali: ए मेरो हजुर ३
- Directed by: Jharana Thapa
- Story by: Jharana Thapa; Suman Poudel
- Produced by: Sunil Kumar Thapa
- Starring: Anmol K.C. Suhana Thapa; Salon Basnet; Arpan Thapa; Rabindra Jha
- Cinematography: Sanjay Lama
- Edited by: Dirgha Khadka
- Music by: Songs: Ashish Aviral; Kalyan Singh; Koshish Chhetri; Pratik Paudel; Puspan Pradhan; Background Scores: Rohit Shakya; Shailesh Shrestha
- Production companies: Suhana Entertainment; Sunil Kumar Thapa Production
- Release date: 12 April 2019 (Nepal)
- Country: Nepal
- Language: Nepali
- Budget: रु 2 Crore
- Box office: रु 8.80 Crore

A Mero Hajur 3 (Nepali: ए मेरो हजुर ३, lit. 'Oh My Dear 3') is a Nepali romantic comedy-drama film, directed by Jharana Thapa (her second film as a director) and produced by Sunil Kumar Thapa, under the banner of Suhana Entertainment and Sunil Kumar Thapa Production. The film stars Suhana Thapa in her debut and Anmol K.C. in the lead roles alongside Salon Basnet, Arpan Thapa and Rabindra Jha.

The film is part of the A Mero Hajur series after A Mero Hajur 2 (2017) and A Mero Hajur (2002). The film was released on 12 April 2019. The film received mixed responses; while its routine story was panned by critics and K.C.'s performance was criticized, it received positive responses for debutante Suhana Thapa's performance, as well as the film's music, cinematography and costume design . The film was a commercial blockbuster and became the 6th Highest Grossing Nepali film in Nepal and the highest grossing film in Anmol K.C.'s career.

== Plot ==
Arya, a simple modern girl, is a big fan of singer Prem. Prem is tired of his life as a singing sensation and wants to live a normal life free of the work load of stardom. With the help of his friend Hari he transforms himself to Ghanshyam Maharjan. Prem meets Arya and after various encounters he gradually falls in love with her. He spends time with her as Ghanshyam Maharjan whom she meets at an event. He proposes to her, revealing his identity as both Ghanshyam and Prem.

Arya rejects him using the excuse of having a bet with her friend. Prem becomes heartbroken, thinking that she only spent time with him to win the bet. Prem's career advisor, Supreme, who is strict and disapproves of his bond with a fan, becomes happy after he learns that they are no longer in touch.

Later, Prem learns that Arya is suffering from cancer and is dying. She rejected his proposal as she could not bear not being together with the man whom she loves most on this planet. In her dying moment she says that they share a special bond, and promises she will come for Prem in the next life. Prem is interviewed by a reporter where he shares his story. The film ends on a sad note.

== Cast ==
- Anmol KC as Prem and Ghanshyam Maharjan
- Suhana Thapa as Arya
- Salon Basnet as Hari
- Arpan Thapa as Supreme (Career Advisor of Prem)
- Rabindra Jha

== Production ==
=== Cast ===
Samragyee RL Shah, Salinman Bania and Salon Basnet were ousted from the film due to shooting schedule conflicts. Salon Basnet later came back to film. Pradeep Khadka was considered to play the lead role but later dropped out of the film. Anmol K.C. later signed the film with 30 lakhs to 40 lakhs Nepalese rupees making him the most expensive actor in Nepal, beating his contemporaries Pradeep Khadka and Paul Shah. Director Jharana Thapa signed her daughter, Suhana Thapa, as lead actress.

=== Production ===
The film began shooting the film in Pokhara, Nepal in September 2018. The release date of the film was announced before film went in production, and the first look of the film was released in October 2018. The film widely demanded by the Nepalese audience after the release of the A Mero Hajur 2.

The film is Suhana Thapa's debut film.

== Soundtrack ==
No.	Title	Lyrics	Music	Singer(s)	Length
1.	"Jindagi Nai Bhandina"	Ek Narayan Bhandari	Ashish Aviral	Sugam Pokharel, Prabisha Adhikari	5:46
2.	"Paraana"	Anand Adhikari	Ashish Aviral	Ashish Aviral, Anju Panta	4:32
3.	"Cheat Day"	Pratik Poudel	Pratik Poudel	Prabisha Adhikari	4:58
4.	"Satya Bhanchhu"	Rabi Malla	Kalyan Singh	Pratap Das	4:25
5.	"A Mero Hajur"	Pratik Poudel	Pratik Poudel, Pushpan Pradhan	Pratap Das	4:26

== See also ==
- List of Nepalese films of 2019
