= Samragyee RL Shah =

Nepalese film actress (born 1995)

- सम्राज्ञी राज्य लक्ष्मी शाह
- Born: 18 November 1995 (age 30); Birgunj, Nepal
- Occupations: Actor; Model
- Years active: 2000-present
- Height: 5.6

Samragyee Rajya Lakshmi Shah (Nepali: सम्राज्ञी राज्य लक्ष्मी शाह; born 18 November 1995), credited as Samragyee RL Shah, is a Nepalese film actress who works in Nepali cinema. Shah is the recipient of several awards, including one NFDC National Film Award and one NEFTA Film Award.

Shah has starred in numerous Nepali films, including A Mero Hajur 2 (2017), Intu Mintu Londonma (2018), and Rato Tika Nidharma (2019). Shah debuted as an actress in the 2016 romantic drama Dreams, which went on to become a commercial success and earned several awards for her performance. She is also related to the Nepali royal family.

== Early life and personal life ==
Shah was born on 18 November 1995 in Birgunj, Nepal, to Neha Rajya Lakshmi Shah and Bikash Bikram Shah. Samragyee RL Shah is related to the Nepali royal family through her grandfather, Pashupati Bikram Shah. According to Anand Nepal of Nepali Actress:

"Samragyee's ancestor Narendra Bikram Shah was the youngest of the two sons of Surendra Bir Bikram Shah. Narendra's son Indra Bikram Shah's cousin Prithivi Bir Bikram Shah was crowned king after the death of Surendra in 1881. At the time of crowning Prithivi Bir Bikram Shah was 7 years old. After Prithivi Bir Bikram Shah, his son Tribhubhan Bir Bikram Shah was the king of Nepal. Tribhuwan is credited for removing Rana rule in Nepal. Tribhuwan's son Mahendra is the father of the now-dethroned ex-king Gyanendra Shah."

Shah attended St. Xavier's Higher Secondary School in Birgunj, Nepal, from grades one to three. She continued her studies at Sai Baba School in New Delhi, India. After completing sixth grade, she attended the Royal Academy of India in Kathmandu.

Shah has dated Devanksh SJB Rana since 2018. In 2017, Shah was included in the list of "Top 10 Women and Men of the Year" published by the weekly publication Kantipur Saptahik, sister publication of Kantipur, where she was ranked in the top tenth position.

== Career 2014 ==
=== Modelling ===
In 2014, Shah was the second runner-up in the Face of Classic Diamond Jewellers fashion competition, receiving a NPR 25,000 cash prize. Nepali model Asmi Shrestha won the event, and Nepali actress and model Paramita RL Rana was the first runner-up. After the competition, Shah was featured on the cover of the M&S VMAG magazine and was also interviewed, in which she revealed her desire to become a model, and said that she felt increased self-esteem and "more beautiful and confident as a person". According to Shah, the fashion competition boosted her popularity and recognition, helped her hone her skills as a model, raised her confidence, and made her "realise that there is still so much to learn as a model", which encouraged her "to work hard every day."

In 2015, Shah appeared in the music video Ek Mauka alongside debutant singer Elvis Joshi. The video received positive media attention and was praised for the performances of both the singer and the actress.

=== 2016–2017: Film debut and commercial success ===
In 2016, Shah debuted as a film actress in Bhuwan K.C.'s romantic drama Dreams, where she starred alongside Anmol K.C. and Sandhya K.C. In the film, Shah played Kavya, the love interest of Aveer. Her performance received mixed responses from critics. The Himalayan Times observed, "Anmol and Shah fall short in their acting. From their dialogue delivery to acting, they are not natural, especially in serious scenes. [...] Shah's acting is acceptable when she is herself in casual composure, but when emotions kick in, she is odd." In an interview, Shah revealed that she was selected out of 26 girls to star in the film. The film became a box office success, earning NPR 17.0 million (17,000,000) in its first two days of release and NPR 50 million (50,000,000) in its first week. In an interview with MovieMandu, the film's producer Bhuwan K.C. stated, "From her first debut movie, she has been able to win the heart of 3 core Nepali [people]". Subsequently, Shah won the Best Debut Actor award from the Dcine Awards, Kamana Film Awards, NFDC National Film Awards, and NEFTA Film Awards.

In 2017, Shah played the lead role in Jharana Thapa's directorial debut film, A Mero Hajur 2. Shah starred alongside Salon Basnet and Salin Man Bania in his acting debut. In the film, she played Maya, who falls in love with someone who had a crush on her when she was younger. The film set a record for the highest single-day box office in Nepal, grossing NPR 16.2 million (16,200,000). Sandhya Ghimire of OnlineKhabar wrote, "The movie keeps the audience laughing as we relate to the foolish things we have had done to gain the attention of our crushes in school. As the story unfolds, we are taken on a train ride back to good old school days, and a multitude of wavelets of nostalgia wash over us." Shah's performance led to her being nominated for her second National Film Award.

=== 2018 ===
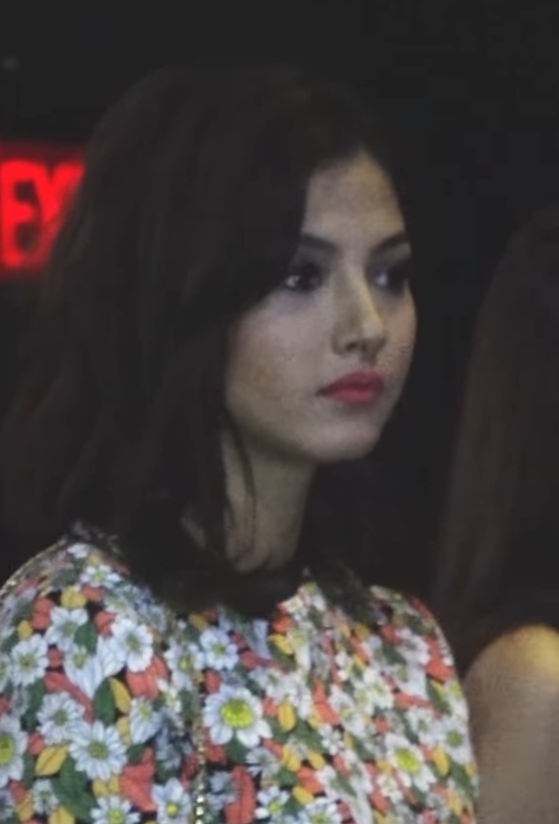
Shah at a press conference promoting her romantic drama A Mero Hajur 2 in 2017.

In 2018, Shah appeared in four Nepali films, including Mangalam, Timi Sanga, Kaira, and Intu Mintu Londonma. In Mangalam, she made a cameo appearance as a psychiatrist. In Shishir Rana's Timi Sanga, Shah appeared in the lead role as a Non-Resident Nepali (NRN). While the film was criticised for its stereotypical representation of the LGBTIQ community, Shah's performance was praised by critics. Shashwat Pant of OnlineKhabar wrote, "Fan favorite Samragyee Shah looks to be in her zone playing the role of an NRN. Acting as the lead in her third film, she has come a long way since her debut movie, Dreams. Her attitude stands out in the film along with her acting in some of the emotional scenes".

In Kaira, Shah appeared in the lead role alongside actor Aaryan Sigdel. The film was commercially unsuccessful—earning only NPR 9.6 million (9,600,000) on its second day—and received mixed reviews from critics. Shah's performance was praised by critics. According to OnlineKhabar, "One good thing that stands out in the movie is the acting. It shows how much the actors have worked on getting their roles right. Shah is good and so is as [sic] Kaira. Her acting is good, especially in the emotional scenes where she's poised and natural. [The reviewer] didn't think she, Samragyee, had it in her to play such an emotional role."

In Intu Mintu Londonma, the directorial debut of choreographer Renasha Bantawa Rai, Shah played the role of Mintu, who unknowingly falls for her friend Intu. Shah's performance received mixed responses from critics. Shashwat Pant of OnlineKhabar wrote, "Samragyee Shah, who always plays the same type of roles, offers nothing new in this film too. But she fits well in the film and has acted well. Her emotional scenes are getting better with each movie she plays." Aditya Neupane of República wrote, "The picture quality, venue selection, and the set and wardrobe designs are comparatively superior to the current mainstream Nepali movies. But lags in the story department." The film became a huge box office success, collecting NPR 20 million (20,000,000) on its second day. On 30 March 2018, Shah received the Star of the Year award at the FAAN Awards. She was awarded alongside fellow actor Pradeep Khadka by the then Prime Minister of Nepal, KP Sharma Oli.

=== 2019 ===
In 2019, Shah worked on Maruni, starring alongside Puspa Khadka and Rebika Gurung. On 11 June 2019, the film released its title track, Jaam Na Maya Jaam, which featured Shah and Pushpa Khadkha. The film was released on 30 August 2019, alongside of Indian action thriller Saaho. Film critics praised Shah for her different role in Maruni. Maruni failed to impress the audience and the box office.

After Ashok Sharma announced his next directorial project, Rato Tika Nidharma, Shah received NPR 1.6 million (1,600,000) for her role, making her the highest-paid actress in Nepali cinema. Shah appeared alongside Neeta Dhungana and Ankit Sharma in his acting debut. Previously, actress Jassita Gurung was considered for the role, but Gurung left the project for undisclosed reasons after Shah replaced her lead role in the film. Rato Tika Nidharma is set to release on 27 September 2019, on the occasion of Dashain, the Hindu festival of Nepal. The film failed at the box office, where it earned est. NPR 7 million.

== Filmography ==
Key
†	Denotes productions that have not yet been released

Year	Title	Role	Director	Notes	Ref(s)
2016	Dreams	Kavya	Diwakar Bhattarai		
2017	A Mero Hajur 2	Maya	Jharana Thapa		
2018	Mangalam		Nawal Nepal	Cameo role	
2018	Timi Sanga	Niti	Shishir Rana		
2018	Kaira	Kaira	Laxman Rijal		
2018	Intu Mintu Londonma	Meera Sharma aka Mintu	Renasha Bantawa Rai		
2019	Maruni	Suman	Nawal Nepal		
2019	Rato Tika Nidharma		Ashok Sharma		
2023	Harry Ki Pyari		Kapil Rijal		
2023	Nango Gau †		Dipendra Lama	Upcoming movie	

== Accolades ==
Year	Award	Category	Film	Result	Ref(s)
2016	NEFTA Film Awards	Best Debut Actor (Female)	Dreams	Won	
2016	NFDC National Film Award	Best Debut Actor (Female)	Dreams	Won	
2016	Kamana Film Award	Best Debut Actor (Female)	Dreams	Won	
2016	DCine Award	Best Debut Actor (Female)	Dreams	Won	
2017	NFDC National Film Award	Best Actor in a Leading Role (Female)	A Mero Hajur 2	Nominated	
2018	DCine Award	Best Actor in a Leading Role (Female)	Kaira	Nominated	
2018	FAAN Awards	Star of the Year	—N/a	Won	
