= Sunil Rawal =

Sunil Rawal (born 23 May 1983) is a film producer and actor active in the Nepali film industry. He has been involved in the film industry since 2012. His first movie as a producer and actor was Saayad, produced under the banner of Durgish Films Pvt. Ltd. and directed by Suraj Subba. He is managing director of Durgish Films Pvt. Ltd. Sequel of his first film Saayad, Saayad 2 was released on 14 July 2017. In 2018 Rawal produced Lahure which is expected to be released on May 11, 2018.

== Filmography ==
Year	Film
2012	Saayad
2013	Hostel
2015	Hostel Returns
2017	Saayad 2

Performed the role of hostel warden in movie " Hostel Returns " . He is also the producer of that film .
