= Saayad =

Nepali coming of age comedy-drama film

- Theatrical release poster
- Directed by: Suroj Subba "Nalbo"
- Screenplay by: Suroj Subba "Nalbo"
- Story by: Suroj Subba "Nalbo"
- Produced by: Sunil Rawal
- Starring: Sunil Rawal; Samyam Puri; Wilson Bikram Rai
- Cinematography: Sanjay Lama
- Music by: Shadows Band; Araaj Keshav Giri
- Production company: Durgish Films
- Release date: 11 May 2012
- Country: Nepal
- Language: Nepali

Saayad (Translation: Probably,सायद) is a 2012 Nepali Coming of age Comedy-drama film written and directed by Suroj Subba "Nalbo". Produced by Sunil Rawal under the banner of Durgish Films, the film features Sunil Rawal, Samyam Puri & Wilson Bikram Rai in pivotal roles.

== Synopsis ==
Saayad is the story of two generations living together, but experiencing the world in very different ways. Whereas the influence of a sincere, hardworking friend transforms the lives of a group of friends for the better, the arrogance of, and lack of guidance for the newer generation sets another group of friends on a track of drugs, death and destruction. The generational clash reveals how moral authority has become corrupted in Nepali society, and how the alienation of the younger generation is pushing them to anarchy.

Writer-director Suroj Subba "Nalbo" has crafted a coming-of-age moral tale, touching upon the dreams and heartbreaks of the young, and the improbable responsibilities of the more mature generations.

== Cast ==
- Sunil Rawal as Nirag
- Samyam Puri as Yodin
- Wilson Bikram Rai as Ved
- Jharana Thapa as Samridhi
- Anita Dahal as shrish
- Ritika Lama as Suchi
- Gopal Yakten as palden
- Dinesh Rawal
- Kishowr Sambampe
- Indra Kumar
- Anil Bamjam
- Karishma Manandhar (Guest Appearance)
- Babu Bogati (Guest Appearance)

== Plot ==
The movie ‘Saayad‘ is the story of two brothers Yodin (played by Samyam Puri) and Nirag (played by Sunil Rawal). After Yodin was born, their family had earned wealth and their life became more easier so Nirag considers Yodin a luck. Yodin's crush, Sirish, was the sister of Nirag's crush, Samridhi. Yodin's best friend Ved (played by Wilson Bikram Rai) introduced Yodin to drugs. Yodin and Ved's group started taking drugs because of the problems in the family and love lives.

Drugs caused them to neglect their study and get involved in gang fights. The story takes a U-turn when Sirish died. It is better to keep from telling, all about how Sirish died and how their lives changed after her death, not to spoil your movie experience in the theatre.

== Sequel ==
The sequel of Saayad, Saayad 2 is made.
