= A Mero Hajur 2 =

2017 Nepali film by Jharna Thapa

- Directed by: Jharana Thapa
- Written by: Harihar Adhikari
- Produced by: Sunil Kumar Thapa
- Starring: Samjhana Lama; Salin Man Bania; Salon Basnet; Amber Subedi; Suman Poudel; Ajashra Dhungana; Anubhav Regmi; Buddhi Tamang; Anurag Kuwar; Wilson Bikram Rai; Asin Crystal RI Rana Jharana Thapa Buddhi Tamang
- Music by: Songs: Basanta Sapkota; Kalyan Singh; Background Scores: Shailesh Shrestha; Rohit Shakya; Costume Designer: Yubi Thapa
- Release date: 1 September 2017
- Country: Nepal
- Language: Nepali
- Budget: रू 1.5 Crore
- Box office: रु 8.4 Crore

A Mero Hajur 2 (Nepali: ए मेरो हजुर २) is a 2017 Nepali musical romantic movie directed by Jharana Thapa The second part of A Mero Hajur series, the film stars Samragyee RL Shah and debutant Salin Man Bania in lead roles. The movie received mixed to negative response from critics with praise for its music but performances of the actors, direction, routine story and screenplay met with negative response from audience and critics. But the film had a huge opening weekend at the box office and owing to that it became a huge success at the box office. The success of the movie was credited for the massive popularity of its predecessor starring Shree Krishna Shrestha and Jharana Thapa and music of the film. The film had further two sequels.

== Cast ==
- Salin Man Bania
- Samragyee RL Shah
- Jharana Thapa
- Salon Basnet
- Swatantra Pratap Shah
- Roshan Rx (From Assam)
- Amber Subedi
- Suman Poudel
- Ajashra Dhungana
- Anubhav Regmi
- Buddhi Tamang
- Anurag Kuwar
- Wilson Bikram Rai
- Asin Crystal RI Rana.

== Visual effects artist ==
- Achyut Bajagain

== Editor ==
- Shahil Khan

== Costume designer ==
- Yubi Thapa

== Songs ==
No.	Title	Singer(s)	Length
1.	"Kasham Ho Kasham"	Sugam Pokharel	6:04
2.	"Kinideu Na Saila Dai"	Sadhana Sargam	4:42
3.	"Ukalima Jada"	Rajesh Payal Rai, Indira Joshi	4:32
