= Anmol K.C. =

Nepalese actor, producer and model

- अनमोल के.सी.
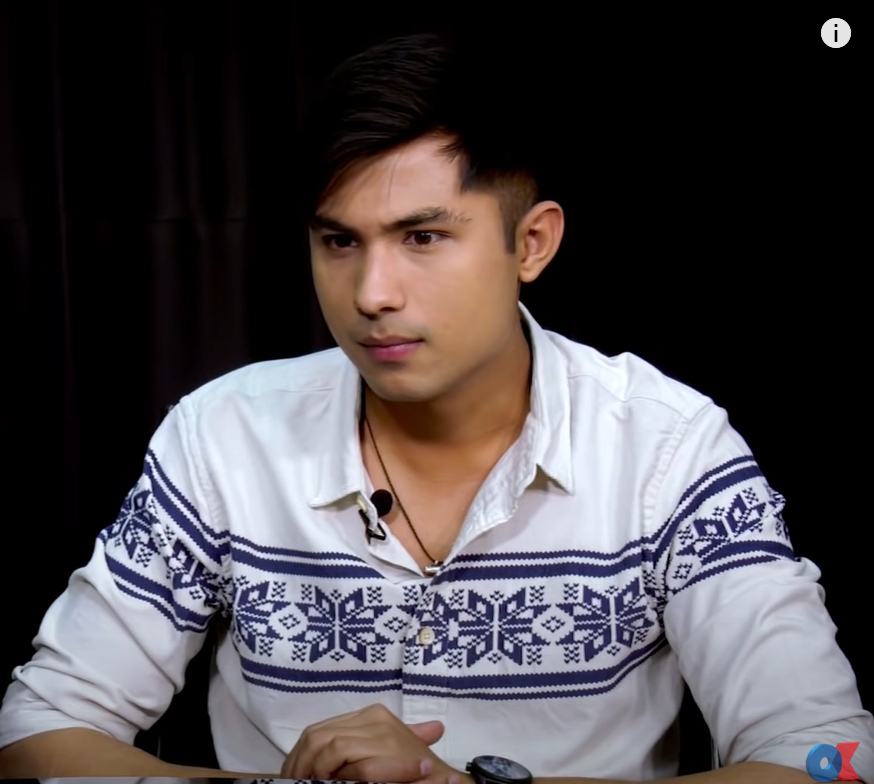
- KC during an interview with OnlineKhabar (2019)
- Born: 30 March 1994 (age 32); Kathmandu, Nepal
- Education: Malpi International College
- Occupation: Actor
- Years active: 2001–present
- Height: 6 ft 2 in (1.88 m)
- Parent(s): Bhuwan KC (father); Sushmita Bomjan (mother)

Anmol K.C. (Nepali: अनमोल के.सी.; born 30 March 1991) is a Nepalese actor and film producer known for his work in contemporary commercial Nepali cinema. He is a son of a prominent Nepalese filmmaker and actor Bhuwan KC and actress Dawa Samdup Hyolmo.

KC made his acting debut in childhood with appearances in his father's home-production films, later gaining prominence with the romantic drama Hostel (2013). He subsequently established himself as a leading figure in youth-oriented Nepali films through commercially successful projects such as Jerry (2014), Dreams (2016), and Kri (2018).

Known for his popularity among younger audiences and his recurring roles in romantic dramas, KC has also drawn media attention for his high remuneration within the Nepali film industry. In addition to acting, he has been involved in production ventures and supports social-awareness campaigns in collaboration with various youth organisations across Nepal.

== Career ==
KC made early appearances as a child artist in his father's productions (including Superstar (2001)) and later featured in a song sequence in Sathi Ma Timro (2012). He made his breakthrough as a lead actor with the coming-of-age drama Hostel (2013), which was commercially successful and helped establish him as a youth star in Nepali cinema.

He consolidated his popularity with a string of commercially successful romantic films, including Jerryy (2014), Dreams (2016) and Gajalu (2016).

KC broadened his on-screen persona with higher-budget action and drama projects such as Kri (2018) and the sports drama Captain (2019).

He starred in the commercially successful franchise entries A Mero Hajur 3 (2019) and A Mero Hajur 4 (2022).

In 2024 he appeared in the fantasy romantic drama Farki Farki, which received strong commercial attention on release.

== Public image and reception ==
Nepali media have frequently described KC as a leading commercial star with significant youth appeal; his films have contributed to trends in youth-oriented mainstream Nepali cinema.

== Legal matters ==
On 29 September 2023, Anmol K.C. was arrested by the Kathmandu District Police following a fraud complaint registered by a film producer. According to police statements reported in multiple national outlets, the complaint alleged non-compliance with a contractual agreement related to a film project.

KC was released the following day after providing a written clarification, and police stated that the dispute would proceed through the standard investigative process. As of the latest reporting, no court verdict has been issued and the case remains under review.

== Personal life ==
Anmol K.C. was born on 30 March 1994 in Kathmandu, Nepal, to a family with a strong legacy in Nepali cinema. His father, Bhuwan KC, is a veteran actor, producer, and director, and his mother, Sushmita Bomjan, is an actress.

He has publicly acknowledged his father’s influence on his career while emphasizing the importance of establishing his own identity in the film industry.

Anmol K.C. attended Malpi International College for his higher secondary education.

== Early career and breakthrough ==
Anmol K.C. made his acting debut in the film Hostel (2013), which became a commercial success and brought him into the spotlight.

Following that, he starred in Jerryy (2014), which, along with later films such as Dreams (2016), Gajalu (2016), Kri (2018), and Captain (2019), helped establish him as one of the leading actors in Nepali cinema.

His early success and successive hits marked his transition from debutant to a commercially bankable lead actor.

== Career highlights ==
Over the years, Anmol K.C. has starred in several commercially successful films. Some of his notable works include Dreams (2016), Gajalu (2016), Kri (2018), Captain (2019), and A Mero Hajur 3 (2019). His 2024 release Farki Farki has been reported as one of his major hits, contributing to a resurgence in his box-office stature.

Anmol K.C. has built a significant fan following, owing to his charm, versatile screen presence, and appeal to younger audiences. Aligning with his public image, his films often revolve around themes such as youth, love, ambition and emotional drama.

Beyond acting, he has reportedly shown interest in expanding his creative role in the film industry, with aspirations of working as a producer or director in future projects.

== Influence ==
Anmol K.C. is regarded as one of the most prominent young actors in Nepali cinema, following in the footsteps of his father, Bhuwan K.C. Despite the expectations associated with his father’s legacy, he has established his own identity in the industry, being recognized for his dedication, versatility, and ability to connect with audiences.

In 2018, he was listed in the Nepali Sansar publication's Top Actor list, where he was placed first, followed by Salin Man Bania and Pradeep Khadka.

== Filmography ==
Key
†	Denotes films that have not yet been released

Year	Film	Role	Notes	Ref(s)
2001	Superstar	—N/a	Child artist	
2012	Sathi Ma Timro	—N/a	Guest Appearance in a song	
2013	Hostel	Aditya Bikram Rana	Debut Film	
2014	Jerryy	Jerry J.B. Rana		
2016	Gajalu	Aarav		
2016	Dreams	Aveer		
2016	Ma Ta Timrai Hoon	—N/a	Producer	
2018	Kri	Abhay		
2019	Captain	Ishan Khadka		
2019	A Mero Hajur 3	Prem/Ghanshyam		
2022	A Mero Hajur 4	Prem		
2023	Chhadke 2.0			
2024	Farki Farki	Madhav Singh Basnet	Super Hit	
2025	Jerry on Top	Jerry	Super hit	
2026	Batulo Jun			
TBA	Before We Met			
TBA	JERRY the last climb			

== Awards ==
Year	Award	Category	Nominated work	Result
2013	Kamana Film Awards	Best debut actor	Hostel	Nominated
2014	Filmykabad Award (OFA)	Best Debut Actor	Hostel	Won
2014	Box Office Film Award	Best Debut Actor	Hostel	Nominated
2014	INFA Awards (Hong Kong)	Best Debut Actor 2014	Hostel	Nominated
2014	NEFTA awards	Best new actor (male)	Hostel	Nominated
2016	NFDC Awards 2016	Maha Jury Award- Popular	Dreams	Won
2016	Kamana Film Awards	Best actor	Dreams	Nominated
2018	NFDC Awards 2018	Best actor	Kri	Won
