= Jharana Thapa =

Nepalese film actress and filmmaker

Jharana Thapa झरना थापा
- Jharana Thapa
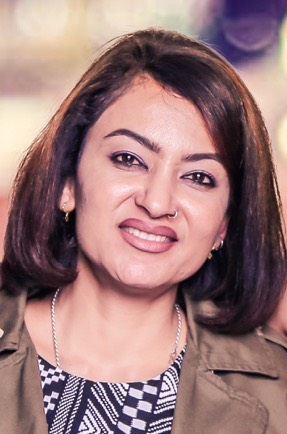
- Born: March 28, 1977 (age 49); Pyuthan
- Education: B.A.
- Alma mater: Mahendra Multiple Camps Dang & P.K Camps Kathmandu
- Occupations: Actress, director
- Years active: 1996–present
- Spouse: Sunil Kumar Thapa (m. 1997)
- Children: Suhana Thapa
- Awards: Fem Botanica KTV Film Awards (2008); KTV Film Award (2009)

Jharana Thapa (Nepali: झरना थापा) (born as Kamala Raj Bhandari on March 28, 1977) is a Nepalese film actress, film producer and film director. She was one of the top star actress of late 90s and 2010s. Thapa made her Kollywood debut in Daijo (1996) opposite star actor Bhuwan K.C. She received critical acclaim for her breakout role in the 1998 movie Dharam Sankat.

After working in Nepali cinema for 20 years, she turned into a film director. Her debut directorial movie A Mero Hajur 2 was released in September 2017.

== Early life ==
Jharana Thapa was born on 28 March 1977 in Pyuthan, Nepal.

== Personal life ==
Jharana Thapa was born as Kamala Raj Bhandari on 28 March 1975 in Nepal. She comes from a family involved in the Nepali film industry. She is the mother of actress Suhana Thapa, who has appeared in films such as A Mero Hajur 3 and A Mero Hajur 4. Thapa’s family background and long-standing career in cinema have contributed to her daughter’s early exposure to the film industry and her development as an emerging actress in contemporary Nepali cinema.

== Career ==
Thapa made her Kollywood debut in Daijo (1996) opposite actor Bhuwan K.C.. She received critical acclaim for her breakout role in the 1998 film Dharam Sankat, which established her as a prominent actress in Nepali cinema.

After a successful acting career spanning over 20 years, Thapa transitioned to film direction. She made her directorial debut with A Mero Hajur 2, which was released in September 2017 under her production banner.

== Filmography ==
=== Actress ===
Films
Year	Title	Role
1996	Daijo saas	
1998	Dharam Sankat	
1999	Jeevan Sathi	
2001	Anjali	
2001	Sukha Dukha	
2001	Bhaitika	
2002	Purnima	
2002	Siundo Ko Sindur	
2003	Muglan	
2009	Subash	

== Awards ==
Year	Award	Category	Movie	Role	Result
2008	Fem Botanica KTV Film Awards 2065	Best Actress	Takdir		Won
2009	KTV Film Award 2066	Best Actress	Ma Timi Bina Mari Halchhu		Won
