= Rajesh Hamal filmography =

List of works by Rajesh Hamal

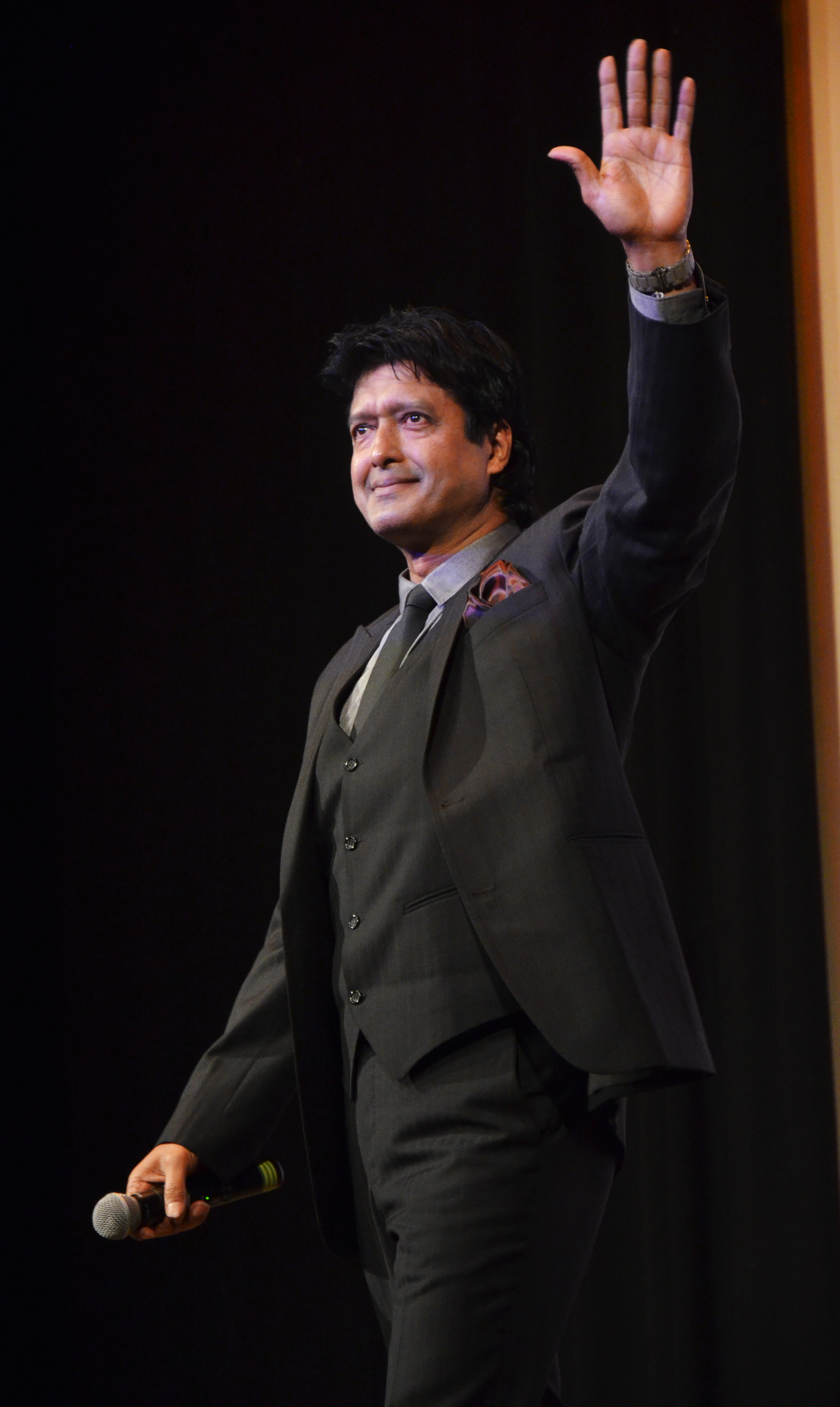
Rajesh Hamal in Sydney, 2014

Rajesh Hamal is a Nepali film actor, singer, model, and television presenter. Hamal used to be one of the highest paid actors in Nepali film throughout the 1990s and 2000s. Hamal debuted as an actor in Deepak Rayamajhi's film Yug Dekhi Yug Samma in 1988. Since then, he has appeared in over 300 Films in a career spanning nearly four decades. He starred in Yug Dekhi Yug Samma (1988), Kasam (1992), Deuta (1991), Ek Number Ko Pakhe (1999), Hami Tin Bhai (2004), Ajambari Naataa (2005) and Mukhauta (2014), among others. He hosts the Nepali version of Who Wants to Be a Millionaire?, titled Ko Bancha Crorepati (2019).

== Films ==
Year	Title	Role	Notes	Ref(s)
1988	Yug Dekhi Yug Samma	Aashish		
1990 1991 1992	Adhikar			
1990 1991 1992	Deuki	Arjun		
1990 1991 1992	Bhauju	Laxman		
1990 1991 1992	Deuta	Shankar	National Film award for Best actor (won)	
1990 1991 1992	Kasam	Arjun		
1990 1991 1992	Chatyang	Shiva	Won National Film Award for Best Actor	
1990 1991 1992	Kacheri	Yeshpal	Punjabi Language feature Film	
1990 1991 1992	Gopikrishna	Gopi, Kishan	Dual role	
1993 1994	Sita		Television Video Film	
1993 1994	Chahana	Arjun		
1993 1994	Aparadh	Arjun		
1993 1994	paribhasa	kumar	National Film award for Best Supporting actor (won)	
1993 1994	Prithvi	Prithivi	National Film award for Best actor (won)	
1993 1994	Sadak		Nominated National Film Award for Best Actor	
1993 1994	Pratigya			
1993 1994	Jwala			
1995	Jiwan Sangarsha			
1995	Bhisma Pratigya	Sudarsan / Karna	Dual role	
1995	Pratikshya	Inspector Arjun		
1996	Simana	Amar	National Film award for Best actor (won)	
1996	Bhul			
1996	Bhariya			
1996	Bishalu	Himself	Cameo (in a song)	
1996	Chori Buhari			
1997	Agni Pariksha			
1997	Avatar			
1997	Bandhan	DeshBhakta Arjun	Cameo	
1997	Allare	Deepak		
1997	Jun Tara			
1997	Shankar	Shankar	National Film award for Best actor (won)	
1998	Afno Birano	Shankar		
1998	Nagad Narayan	Nagad		
1998	Dautari	Arjun		
1998	Pardesi	Arjun		
1998	Dharma Sankat			
1998	Sindur Pote			
1998	Saathi	Deepak	National Film award for Best Actor (won)	
1998	Chor	Raju		
1998	Gaule			
1999	Mr Ramkrishne	Ram / Krishne	Dual role Won National Film award for best Performance in a Comic Role	
1999	Dharma Putra	Arjun	Won National Film Award for Best actor	
1999	Mato Bolcha	Shankar	Won National Film award for Best actor Won Lux Award for Best actor	
1999	Ek Number Ko Pakhe	Shankar/ Pakhe		
1999	Chamatkaar	Shankar / Arjun	Dual role	
1999	Surakashaa	Shankar		
1999	Chadhni	Arjun	National Film award for Best actor (won)	
1999	Pardesi Kancha	Kancha		
1999	Paapi	Rajesh		
2000	Chalachitra	Himself	Cameo	
2000	Basanti	Gagan Singh Khawas	National Film award for Best actor (won)	
2000	Maili	Arjun		
2000	Dhukdhuki	Arjun		
2000	Jindagani	Bijay		
2000	Panchi	Doctor kritik	Cameo	
2000	Muktidaata		Won National Film Award for Best Actor; Won Lux Film Award for Best actor Won Kalakar award for best actor	
2000	Hero	Hero/Shankar		
2000	Maya baiguni	Himself	Cameo	
2000	Yo Maya Ko Sagar	Sagar		
2001	Taal	Lakpa		
2001	Awara	Arjun		
2001	Upakar	Vishal		
2001	Pooja	Arjun		
2001	Hamro jindagani	Himself	Cameo (in a song)	
2001	Izzat	Shankar		
2001	Ashirbad	Bale		
2001	Bhagya le jurayo	Engineer Arjun	Cameo	
2001	Hamro Sano ghar hola	Himself	Cameo (in a song)	
2001	Anmol	Vijay	Supporting role	
2001	Sanyas	Arjun		
2001	Chakravyuh	Shankar		
2001	Nepal Pyaro Cha	Shankar		
2001	Siudko ko Sindoor	Ramesh/Prasant	Dual role	
2001	Man ko Tukra	Truck Driver Arjun		
2001	Gham Chaaya	Inspector		
2002	Arjun	Arjun	Won National Film Award for Best Actor; Won Journalist Award for Best actor	
2002	Kranti	Shankar		
2002	Maya Namara	Shiva/ Samrat		
2002	Hatyeri		Won; Lux Award for Best actor	
2002	Je bho ramrai bho	Shambhu	Won National Film Award for Best Supporting actor	
2003	Afnopan	Arjun		
2003	Chautari			
2003	Goreto	Dhane	National Film award for Best actor (won); Journalist Award for Best Actor (won)	
2003	Shiva Shakti	Shiva		
2003	Dukha	Arjun		
2003	Haar Jeet			
2003	Khola wari Khola Pari	Himself	Cameo	
2003	Jetho Kancho	Kancha	Won National Film Award for Best Actor	
2003	Yestai Rahecha Jindagi	Arjun		
2004	Hami Tin Bhai	Hari	Journalist award for Best Actor (won)	
2004	Bishwas	himself	Cameo	
2004	Mangal Sutra	Shankar		
2004	Karnabir	Captain Karnabir		
2004	Dharmatma	Dharmatma/ Shankar	National Film award for Best actor (won)	
2004	Thule	Thule		
2004	Karan Arjun	Karan/ Arjun		
2004	Ram laxman	Ram		
2004	Majhi Dai	Majhi Dai		
2004	Maya Basecha	Arjun		
2004	Bashanta Ritu	Basanta		
2004	Santan	Shankar		
2005	Paapi Manche	Himself	Extended Cameo	
2005	Chattan	Arjun		
2005	Karma Yoddha	Amar	National Film award for Best actor (won)	
2005	Hami Taxi Driver	Yogi/ Shankar		
2005	Jeevan Daata	DSP Arjun		
2005	Lav Kush	Lav/ Ram	Dual role	
2005	Dadagiri	DSP Vijay/ Dada		
2005	Man ma Maya	Ram		
2005	Hungama	Vijay		
2005	Ladaai	Inspector Abhay	Cameo	
2005	Maidan	Amar	National Film Award for Best Actor(Won)	
2005	Ajambari Nata	Karna		
2005	Ukali orali	Vijay		
2005	Mamata	Amar		
2005	Kasto Saino	Dev/ Ajay		
2005	Raju Raja Ram	Raju		
2006	Nikhil Dai	CID inspector Shankar		
2006	Manis	Prisoner(Uncredited)	Cameo	
2006	Raghubir	Rakesh	National Film award for Best Supporting actor (won)	
2006	Shakti	Narrator/ himself	Cameo (in a song)	
2006	Dobato	Professor Vijay	National Film award for Best Actor(won)	
2006	Kratviya	Shankar		
2007	Paale dai	Pale dai/ Madan	Dual role	
2007	Aama ko kakh	Shankar		
2007	Krishna Arjun	Bire	National Film award for best supporting actor(won)	
2007	Timi Meri Haau	Romeo	National Film award for Best Performance in a Negative role (won)	
2007	Danveer			
2007	Maryada	Vijay	National Film award for Best Supporting Actor(won)	
2007	Bhagya vidhaata	DSP Raj Bikram		
2007	Trishul	Rajesh	Journalist award for Best Actor (won)	
2007	Kanoon	Captain Shankar		
2007	Nepal	Arjun		
2008	Mausham	Raja		
2008	Darr	Prithivi	National Film Award for Best Supporting actor(won)	
2008	Khalnayak	Narayan Dai	Cameo	
2008	Breakfail		Antagonist	
2008	Insaf	Superstar Shankar	Extended Appearance	
2008	Faisala	DSP Rupak		
2008	Giraftaar	Captain Vijay	National Film Award for Best Supporting actor(won)	
2009	Rakshak			
2009	Jay Shiva Shankar	Shankar	National Film award for Best actor(won)	
2009	Shapath			
2009	Izzatdar	Vijay		
2009	Didi bhai	Vijay		
2009	Karbahi			
2009	Hamro Milan Kahile hunxa			
2009	Jungabaaz	Vicky		
2009	The Yug Dekhi Yug Samma	Sanju	Remake of 1988 Yug dekhi Yug samma	
2009	Bhagwan sabai ko	Ram		
2009	Hat lagyo sunya		National Film award for Best Performance in a Comic Role (won)	
2010	Bato Muniko Phul	Police officer	Cameo	
2010	Bazaar			
2010	Suhabhiiman			
2010	Fareki Aau			
2010	Dulahi			
2010	Krishna	Himself	Cameo	
2010	Dharmaa	Vijay	National Film award for Best Supporting Actor (won)	
2011	Prahar	Arjun		
2011	Guru Dakshina	Guru		
2011	Sahasi			
2011	Ma maya garchu timi lai	Shankar		
2011	yoddha		Cameo	
2011	Nishana	DSP Sharma	Cameo	
2011	Champa chameli			
2011	Chabilal Kanjus Xaina	Truck Driver Indra	National Film award for Best Performance in a Comic Role (won)	
2011	Mero Pyaro Maiti Ghar			
2011	Mato			
2011	Raajneeti			
2011	Sapana			
2011	jwalamukhi	Arjun	Bhojpuri language feature film	
2011	Desh			
2011	Maya's Bar		Antagonist	
2011	Das Ghaja	Shankar	National Film award for Best Actor (won); Journalist award for Best Actor (won)	
2012	Mero Rajesh Dai	Rajesh	Starred with his lookalike Actor Sital KC	With Sital KC
2012	Ma maya garchu timi lai			
2012	Night Queen	Rajesh		
2012	Mero Jeevan Saathi			
2012	Mero Man ko Saathi	Shankar		
2012	Paltan	Major Prabhkar Wagle/Imposter		
2012	Jyan hajir chha	Shankar		
2012	Jai hos			
2013	Kishan	Arjun		
2013	Facebook	Police Inspector	Cameo	
2013	Kina Kina			
2014	Akaal			
2014	Hasiya	DSP		
2014	Cha ekan Cha	Himself	Cameo	
2014	Chandrawoti	SuperstarShankar		
2014	Mukhauta			
2015	Soul Sister			
2016	Trishuli	Himself	Cameo	
2016	Tulsi	Himself	Cameo in a Song	
2016	Bagmati	Rajesh	Most expensive Movie of Nepal in that time	
2016	Phagu	Doctor Saab	Cameo	
2016	Shakuntala	Shakuntala		
2016	Bijuli Machine		Cameo	
2017	Just For You			
2025	Narsimha Avatar	Avinash Bikram Shah	Comeback After 8 Years	

== Television ==
Year	Title	Role	Notes
2010	Meri Bassai	Himself	Cameo
2010	Sita		Supporting Role
2016	Quizmania	Quizmaster	
2019–present	Bhadragol	Himself	Cameo
2019–present	Ko Banchha Crorepati	Host	
2020	Jaat Ko Prashna	Host	Talk Show

== Stage ==
Year	Title	Role	Notes
2013	Court Martial		

== Music videos ==
Year	Title	Artists	Notes
2019	Byarthai Rahecha	Lokraj Adhikari, Laxman Shesh, Uday Sotang	
