= Mann Ko Bandh =

- Directed by: Prakash Thapa
- Screenplay by: Prakash Thapa
- Story by: Shreedhar Khanal
- Produced by: Royal Nepal Film Corporation
- Starring: Salyan K.C., Sushma Shahi, Neer Shah, Basundhara Bhusal
- Cinematography: Baikuntha Man Maskey
- Edited by: Tirtha Lal Shrestha
- Music by: Nati Kaji, Shiva Shankar
- Release date: 18 February 1974
- Running time: Approx. 130 minutes
- Country: Nepal
- Language: Nepali

Mann Ko Bandh (Nepali: मनको बाँध) is a 1973 Nepali-language drama film directed by Prakash Thapa. It holds a significant place in the history of Nepalese cinema as the very first feature film produced by the Royal Nepal Film Corporation, a government body established in 1971 to promote native filmmaking.

The film premiered in late 1973 (2030 B.S. in the Bikram Sambat calendar) in Kathmandu and saw its widespread commercial release on February 18, 1974.

== Plot and themes ==
Mann Ko Bandh is a social realist drama that focuses heavily on rural development, civic duties, and nation-building. Set against the backdrop of rural Nepal during the Panchayat regime, the storyline follows community dynamics and personal struggles at the village level.

The movie was deliberately conceptualized to promote the "Back to the Village National Campaign" (Gaun Pharka Rastriya Abhiyan), a state-led initiative by King Mahendra aimed at discouraging rural-to-urban migration and fostering grassroots infrastructure development. Through its characters, the narrative preaches teamwork, community morality, and civic accountability.

== Cast ==
The film featured prominent actors of early Nepalese cinema, serving as a career launchpad for several artists who later became industry veterans:

- Salyan K.C. as the male protagonist
- Sushma Shahi as the female protagonist
- Neer Shah (credited as Neer Bikram Shah) in one of his earliest notable on-screen performances
- Basundhara Bhusal
- Subhadra Adhikari
- Hari Prasad Rimal

== Production ==
Prior to the early 1970s, Nepalese films like Aama (1964) and Maitighar (1966) were either fully funded directly by government departments or executed by private entities utilizing technicians from India.

The establishment of the Royal Nepal Film Corporation aimed to industrialize local cinema. Mann Ko Bandh was commissioned as its flagship project to prove the corporation's production capabilities. Principal photography took place on location across the Kathmandu Valley and surrounding rural districts under the supervision of cinematographer Baikuntha Man Maskey.

== Sound Track ==
The musical score of Mann Ko Bandh features some enduring classics in Adhunik Geet history. The musical duo Nati Kaji and Shiva Shankar composed the music, while background arrangements were handled by maestro Amber Gurung.

Other iconic singers like Narayan Gopal and Mira Rana also contributed playback vocals to the film's soundtrack department.

S.N	Title	Lyrics	Singer(s)
1	Phool Ko Thunga Bahera Gayo	Madhav Prasad Ghimire	Tara Devi
2	Mero Suvakamana Timilai	Kiran Kharel	Bachhu Kailash

== Historical legacy ==
Though modern film historians acknowledge that Mann Ko Bandh carried strong political undertones favoring the active governance of the time, the film is universally preserved as a cultural milestone. It paved the way for future institutional productions by the corporation, such as Nepal's first color film, Kumari (1977), and established a structured framework for local actors and technical crew inside Nepal.
