= Shiva Shankar =

Shiva Shankar Manandhar

Background information
- Born: Shiva Shankar Manandhar; 22 February 1932; Newroad, Kathmandu, Nepal
- Died: 14 November 2004 (aged 72) Kalimati, Kathmandu, Nepal
- Genres: Singer, music composer
- Occupations: Singer, Music Composer, Actor
- Years active: 1951–2000

Shiva Shankar Manandhar (Nepali: शिव शंकर मानन्धर; 22 February 1932 – 14 November 2004) was a singer, music composer of Nepali songs, and the lead actor in the first Nepali movie, Aama. For nearly a half century beginning from 1950 to late 1990, his name has probably been mentioned more often in books, journals, lectures and conversations about Nepalese music than any other musicians.. He is considered as the most versatile music composer of Nepal and his music style was followed by several contemporary musicians.

Singing and composing music for songs of love, tragedy, devotion (bhajan) and patriotism, he pioneered many of the genres of modern Nepali music. He has composed music for around 1,200 Nepalese songs. He himself sang about three hundred songs. For these contributions, Shiva Shankar received dozens of prestigious national awards.

Shiva Shankar Manandhar was recruited to the service of the state-owned Radio Nepal in 1951 by Bal Krishna Sama, the pre-eminent playwright of Nepal. Soon he was tasked with exploring and mentoring new musical talent and overseeing the recording of songs in the studio for radio broadcast. Together with his colleague Nati Kaji, he made Radio Nepal an institution for breeding modern Nepalese music and songs. All Nepalese singers and musicians of the later half of the twentieth century came into prominence through this institution. Radio Nepal fostered not only the in-country musical talents, but also motivated several prodigious musicians of Darjeeling (India) to blossom in Nepal. They included Amber Gurung, Gopal Yonzon, Aruna Lama and several others.

While working at Radio Nepal, Shiva Shankar composed music for many prominent Nepalese singers. These included Tara Devi (singer), Mira Rana, Nirmala Shrestha, Gyanu Rana, Aruna Lama, Kunti Moktan, Ganga Malla, Puspa Nepali, Narayan Gopal, Prem Dhwoj Pradhan, Yogesh Vaidhya, Udit Narayan, Dhruba KC, Manik Ratna, Deep Shrestha, Bhakta Raj, Bacchu Kailash, Rubi Joshi, Lochan Bhattarai, Pannakaji, Prakash Shrestha, Dilmaya Khati, Deepak Bajracharya and several others. He composed music for prominent lyricists such as Ram Man Trishit, Kiran Kharel, Bhabuk, Yadab Kharel, Laxman Lohani, and MBB Shah (Mahendra of Nepal). Performing for fifty years, he helped Nepalese music attain popularity in what was termed the "Golden Age".

Besides creating popular melodies, he also experimented with innovations in Nepalese music. He demonstrated how folk songs rendered with a few simple musical instruments could be enriched with an ensemble of modern contemporary orchestra instruments. The trend of modernization with the introduction of pop-style songs, which Shankar played a large role in starting, catalyzed the emergence of the present day full-fledged Nepalese pop songs. Although he pioneered changes and innovation, he always advocated for preserving the unique essence of Nepalese style, so that Nepalese songs would not be overshadowed by foreign songs and music.

Shiva Shankar Manandhar played the leading role of a "Lahure Dai" in the film Aama (Mother), the first Nepali feature movie, produced in 1964 (2021 BS) by the Government of Nepal. However, he did not pursue an acting career except for a few cameo appearances in documentaries. Nevertheless, he composed music for several movies in the early days of the Nepalese film industry.

== Early life ==
He was born to mother Ram Maya and father Man Bahadur on 22 February 1932 in a Manandhar household of the Newar community, in Pako, Newroad of Kathmandu, Nepal. Man Bahadur Manandhar was a volunteer music teacher in the local community and taught classical Newari songs to the youngsters. Shiva Shankar's musical aspirations were probably inspired by his father's community activity. Unfortunately, his father died at a very early age. Shankar completed his secondary school education, but did not pursue any formal musical education before becoming established as a singer and music composer. In 1974, he pursued a graduate course in Indian classical music at Kalanidhi Sangeet College in Kathmandu.

== Career ==
He took a job at Radio Nepal in May 1951 (2007 BS) and served there for the next 42 years. This was the period of his active creative life. For forty years, he composed and sang hit songs. From 1987 to 1991 (2043-2047 BS), he was the executive director of the Ratna Recording Corporation. He retired from Radio Nepal in 1996 (2051 BS).

His post-retirement period coincided with the onset of commercialization in Nepalese music. He could not adapt to the glamour of commercialization and eschewed making commercial music. As with his contemporary colleagues in music, he remained virtually silent after retirement. In 2004, he was diagnosed with terminal stage liver cancer. He died on November 14, 2004.

== Personal life ==
He married Badri Kumari Manandhar at the age of 24 and had three sons: Gaurishankar, Rabi Shankar and Shashi Shankar. None of them followed a career in music. Badri Kumari supported the family economically by running a family business. She died in September 1998.

== Awards ==
Note: all dates are in Bikram Samwat.

=== Various national awards ===
- First Place in the All Nepal Music Competition – 2019
- Best Music Composition Awards – 2020, 2021, 2025 and 2027
- Mahendra-Ratna Abhushan – 2022
- Gorkha Dakshin Bahu 4th - 2035
- Chinnalata Award – 2043
- Gunaraj Music Award - 2043
- Trishaktipatta 3rd - 2053
- Nepal Motion Picture Award – 2056
- Supradipta Birendra Pajatantra Bhashkar 3rd – 2060
- Image Life-time Achievement Award - 2058
- Natikaji Memorial Award – 2061

=== Recognitions and honors ===
- Nepal Motion Picture Artists Union – 2050
- Sadhana Samman by the Shadhana Art Foundation – 2054
- Radio Nepal – 2055
- Golden Jubilee Samman of Radio Nepal – 2056
- Nepal Samman by the Sagarmatha Academy – 2057
- Kathmandu Municipality Ward 13 – 2057
- Ahwan Organization - 2057
- Mahadev Samman by the Keshav-Sushma Bhajan Guthi – 2058

== Filmography ==
- Aama (Theme song, with Nati Kaji)
- Manko Bandh (with Nati Kaji)
- Kumari (with Chandra Raj)
- Pachis Basanta
- Shanti Deep

== Broadway songs (Geeti Natak) and albums of situational songs ==
- Ashirbad ("Farewell to Bride"): An album of situational songs (concept album) describing emotional expressions of a bride and her relatives during marriage ceremony in Nepalese villages. Ashirbad literally translates as blessing in the Nepali language. After the wedding, the bride moves into her husband’s family, usually far away from her family and friends. Since marriage is arranged by the elders of the family, the bride is surrounded by unfamiliar people, in new relationship, and with new duties. It is a sad moment for the bride and her family. The parents, relatives and friends of the bride pray God to bless her (aashirbad) with all the fortune and the happiness of the world in her new home. The album was produced in 1970, at the eve of wedding of the crown prince Dipendra of Nepal. The lyrics were written by Laxman Lohani and the music was written by Shiva Shankar. The songs comprise contemporary modern styles blended with Nepalese folk tunes.
- Nalapanima ("Battle at the Nalapani Fort") - Lyrics: Bal Krishna Sama
- Parikshya ("Ordeal") - Lyrics: Tulsi Dibas
- Swongu Nagu ("Three Stars") - Lyrics: Durga Lal Shrestha
- Sulochana (Based on an epic poem) - Lyrics: Shyam Das Vaishnav (Not Staged)
- Satyam Shivam Sundaram
