= Hira Singh Khatri =

Nepalese film director

Hira singh Khatri
- हिरा सिं खत्री
- Born: Dehradun, Uttarakhand, India
- Died: Mumbai, Maharashtra, India
- Citizenship: Indian
- Occupation: Film Director
- Notable work: Aama; hijo aajha voli; Parivartan

Hira Singh Khatri (Nepali: हिरा सिं खत्री) is the director of the first Nepali movie, Aama. After the success of the first movie, he directed two more movies for the Nepal government.

== Filmography ==
Films
| Year | Film |
|---|---|
| 1964 | Aama |
| 1968 | hijo aajha voli |
| 1971 | Parivartan |
