= Yo Maya Ko Sagar =

2000 Nepalese film directed by Ashok Sharma

- Theatrical release poster
- Nepali: यो मायाको सागर
- Directed by: Ashok Sharma
- Screenplay by: Rajkumar Shrestha
- Story by: Sambhujeet Baskota
- Produced by: Kiran Sharma
- Starring: Ramesh Upreti; Jal Shah; Neer Shah; Rajesh Hamal; Karishma Manandhar; Harihar Sharma
- Cinematography: Raju Thapa
- Music by: Sambhujeet Baskota
- Release date: December 31, 2000 (Nepal)
- Running time: 152 minutes
- Country: Nepal
- Language: Nepali

Yo Maya Ko Sagar (Nepali: यो मायाको सागर; transl. This Ocean of Love) is a 2000 Nepali romance drama film directed by Ashok Sharma and produced by Kiran Sharma. It was released on December 31, 2000. The film stars Ramesh Upreti, Jal Shah, Rajesh Hamal, Neer Shah, Harihar Sharma, Saranga Shrestha, and Karishma Manandhar.

== Plot ==
Bishal is a college student in Kathmandu. He is in love with Lily, but he is a playboy who does not take relationships seriously. He is barred from his college due to his misbehavior. Prior to this, he had already been expelled from every other college in the city. His father, Bishwa Pratap, sends him to a college in Pokhara. Bishal plans to get expelled somehow from the college in Pokhara so he can go back to Kathmandu. However, he sees Mala and falls in love with her at first sight. He decides to stay in the city. On the other hand, Abhayjan, Mala's father, wants Mala to marry. But Mala asks him for some time, and she promises him that if she does not get a life partner for herself in that time, she will marry whomever her father wants her to. Consequently, Mala and Bishal fall in love and decide to marry. Bishal is on his way to meet Abhayjan, but on the way, Pitambar hires a truck driver to kill him, and in an attempt to save himself, Bishal accidentally crashes into Abhayjan. Abhayjan is angered and publicly insults Bishal, and Bishal also gets angry at Abhayjan, and he also insults him for his disabled leg. Later, when Bishal arrives at Mala's house, he realizes that Abhayjan is her father. He apologizes to him, but he does not accept it. After their parents decline their relationship, Mala and Bishal run away. They wed and live in Sagar's house. There, the backstory of Sagar's life is revealed. His brother-in-law Jagat was considered a terrorist, and Sagar was formerly a police inspector. However, Sagar killed his wife Priya by mistake when she attempted to save her brother during bhai tika. Pitambar later captures Mala and Bishal. But with their family's and Sagar's support, they fight back, escape, and have Pitambar arrested. Abhayjan and Bishwa Pratap accept their children's relationship.

== Cast ==
- Ramesh Upreti as Bishal
- Jal Shah as Mala
- Neer Shah as Abhayjan: Mala's father
- Harihar Sharma as Bishwa Pratap: Bishal's father
- Rajesh Hamal as Sagar
- Karishma Manandhar as Priya: Sagar's wife
- Saranga Shrestha as Lily
- Narayan Tripathi as Narayan
- Ashok Sharma as Hari Nath (Harry)
- Sunil Thapa as Pitambar
- Surbir Pandit as Jagat: Priya's brother

== Music ==
There are six songs, and all of the songs were composed by Sambhujeet Baskota.

No.	Title	Lyrics	Singer(s)	Length
1.	"Lau Lau Aaye Lily"	Shankar Kharel	Sambhujeet Baskota	5:17
2.	"Kalo Choli Makhamali"	Dhanendra Bimal	Sambhujeet Baskota, Devika Pradhan	5:25
3.	"Timi Hunchha Bhana"	Chhewang Sherpa Lama	Udit Narayan, Sadhana Sargam	6:06
4.	"Sapanima Aai Satayau Malai"	Chhewang Sherpa Lama	Vinod Rathod, Devika Pradhan	6:30
5.	"Hera Bataas Le Suseldai"	Chhewang Sherpa Lama	Udit Narayan, Deepa Jha	6:16
6.	"Timro Mayale Ke Garyo"	Surendra Rana	Udit Narayan, Deepa Jha	6:08
Total length:				35:42
