= Ram Man Trishit =

Nepalese musician (c. 1941–2011)

Ram Man Shrestha "Trishit" (c. 1941 – 31 May 2011) was a highly reputed lyricist of Nepali songs.

He was a medical doctor by profession. He wrote many lyrics, most of which were turned into music by Shiva Shankar and sung by Tara Devi. The friendship between Ram Man and Shiva Shankar lasted until the death of Shiva Shankar. These two grand maestros of modern Nepalese music worked together and inspired each other that resulted in several masterpieces. Nati kaji and Gopal Yonjan also composed music for some of his songs.

== Death ==
He died in Chabahil on 31 May 2011, aged 70.

== Notable songs ==
"Dilma hajur ayera"—Tara Devi (singer)
"Bhan yaha hajarawuma"—Nirmala Shrestha
"Yek phool jharera ke bho"—Tara Devi
"Mancheko maya yaha"—Narayan Gopal/Gyanu Rana
"Nachineko jastai timile"—Dhruba KC
"Yewuta tara jharda pani"—CP Lohani
"Timi ayewu kagajko phula"—Prem Dhoj
"Ishara ta garnu bhayo"—Tara Devi
"Maile punya manparaye"—Narayan Gopal
"Kasari dewu ma mero parichaya"—Udit Narayan
