= Yug Dekhi Yug Samma =

- Directed by: Deepak Rayamajhi
- Story by: Kuber Sharma
- Produced by: Chabiraj Ojha; Kuber Sharma
- Starring: Rajesh Hamal; Kristi
- Cinematography: Javed Shah
- Music by: Sambhujeet Baskota
- Release date: 25 August 1991
- Running time: 149 min
- Country: Nepal
- Language: Nepali
- Budget: Rs. 20 lakh
- Box office: Rs. 70 lakh

Yug Dekhi Yug Samma (Nepali: युग देखी युग सम्म) is a 1991 Nepalese film directed by Deepak Rayamajhi and starring Rajesh Hamal, and Kristi Mainali. This is Hamal's first Nepali movie as a lead actor.

Kristi Mainali and Rajesh Hamal have acted together in 6 movies including this. They appeared in Kasam (1992), Gopi Krishna (1992), Aparadh (1994), Sadak (1994) and Adhikar (1995).

== Premise ==
The film concerns the romance of a young couple, amidst the pressure of their family rivalries are bound to a path which seemed irreversible.

== Cast ==
- Rajesh Hamal as Aasheesh
- Kristi Mainali as Kanchan
- Tika Pahari as Trilok Chandra Thapa, Kanchan's father
- Sushila Rayamajhi
- Madan Das Shrestha
- Rachana Singh
- Gopal Raj Mainali
- Mohan Niraula
- Gopal Bhutani
- Narendra Thapa
- Santu Tamang
- N.B. Maharjan
- Pradeep Singh
- Srawan Kumar Acharya as Fighting Artist

== Music ==
All the songs were composed by Sambhujeet Baskota and the lyrics were penned by Kiran Kharel, Dinesh Adhikari, Kamal Thapa, and Kuber Sharma.

Song	Singer(s)
Andhile Rokna Sakdaina	Udit Narayan Jha, Anuradha Paudwal
Nachana Maichang	Danny Denzongpa
Ma Nachchu	Vijay Benedict
Tin Pate Dada	Anuradha Paudwal
Man Bhitra	Udit Narayan Jha, Deepa Jha
Man Bhitra (sad)	
