= Miss Nepal 2009 =

- Date: September 25, 2009
- Venue: Tribhuvan Army Club, Kathmandu
- Broadcaster: NTV
- Entrants: 16
- Winner: Zenisha Moktan; Kathmandu

Hidden Treasures Miss Nepal 2009, 13th Miss Nepal contest took place on September 25, 2009, at the Tribhuvan Army Club in Kathmandu. There were 16 young women, aged 18 years and above, shortlisted for the final. Miss Nepal 1994, Ruby Rana, crowned the new Fem Miss Nepal 2009 on September 25, 2009. The winner, Zenisha Moktan, represented Nepal at Miss World 2009, and the 1st Runner Up Richa Thapa Magar represented Nepal at Miss Earth 2009.

== Results ==
Color keys

- The contestant Won in an International pageant.
- The contestant was a Runner-up in an International pageant.
- The contestant was a Semi-Finalist in an International pageant.
- The contestant assumed another title.
- The contestant was not able to compete in an International pageant.
- The contestant did not place but won a Special Award in the pageant.
- The contestant did not place.

Final results	Contestant	International pageant	International Results
Miss Nepal 2009 (Winner)	Kathmandu - Zenisha Moktan	Miss World 2009	Unplaced
1st runner-up (Miss Earth Nepal 2009)	(Nepal) Syangja - Richa Thapa Magar	Miss Earth 2009	Unplaced
1st runner-up (Miss Earth Nepal 2009)	(Nepal) Syangja - Richa Thapa Magar	Miss Tourism International 2009	Unplaced
2nd runner-up	Kathmandu - Kunchhang Moktan Tamang		
Top 5	Kathmandu – Aayusha Karki		
Top 5	(Nepal) Lalitpur – Reetu Shakya		
Top 10	(Nepal) Chainpur – Linka Shakya		
Top 10	(Nepal) Jhapa – Punam Thapaliya		
Top 10	Kathmandu – Ashiya Banua		
Top 10	Kathmandu – Ashmita Agrawal		
Top 10	(Nepal) Saptari – Padmini Jha		

=== Sub-Titles ===
Award	Contestant
Miss Beautiful Hair	(Nepal) Saptari – Padmini Jha
Miss Best Complexion	Kathmandu - Aayusha Karki
Miss Photogenic	Kathmandu - Aayusha Karki
Miss Personality	(Nepal) Syangja - Richa Thapa Magar
Miss Talent	' (Nepal) Syangja - Richa Thapa Magar
Miss Best Smile	(Nepal) Jhapa - Punam Thapaliya
Miss Popular Choice	Kathmandu - Akriti Shrestha
Miss Best Walk	Kathmandu - Zenisha Moktan
Miss Friendship	Kathmandu - Ashmita Agrawal

== Contestants ==
#	Contestant	Age	Height	Hometown	Placement
1	Reetu Shakya	23	1.75 m (5 ft 9 in)	Lalitpur	Top 5
2	Ashiya Banua	23	1.72 m (5 ft 7 1/2 in)	Kathmandu	Top 10
3	Hunny Manandhar	19	1.70 m (5 ft 7 in)	Kathmandu	
4	Prativa Dhakal	21	1.68 m (5 ft 6 in)	Kathmandu	
5	Punam Thapaliya	23	1.68 m (5 ft 6 in)	Jhapa	Top 10; Miss Best Smile
6	Kalpana Pathak	20	1.72 m (5 ft 7 1/2 in)	Kathmandu	
7	Shova Dangol	21	1.68 m (5 ft 6 in)	Nuwakot	
8	Linka Shakya	22	1.69 m (5 ft 6 1/2 in)	Chainpur	Top 10
9	Zenisha Moktan	20	1.71 m (5 ft 7 1/2 in)	Kathmandu	Winner; Miss Best Walk
10	Ashmita Agrawal	19	1.73 m (5 ft 8 in)	Kathmandu	Top 10; Miss Friendship
11	Aayusha Karki	19	1.72 m (5 ft 7 1/2 in)	Kathmandu	Top 5 Miss Best Complexion; Miss Photogenic
12	Richa Thapa Magar	23	1.68 m (5 ft 6 in)	Syangja	1st Runner Up; Miss Personality; Miss Talent
13	Padmini Jha	23	1.71 m (5 ft 7 1/2 in)	Saptari	Top 10; Miss Beautiful Hair
14	Kunchhang Moktan Tamang	20	1.73 m (5 ft 8 in)	Kathmandu	2nd Runner Up
15	Akriti Shrestha	21	1.68 m (5 ft 6 in)	Kathmandu	Miss Popular Choice
16	Pranuptee Thapa	20	1.69 m (5 ft 6 1/2 in)	Kathmandu	

== Notes ==
- Contestant #1, Reetu Shakya was second runner-up at the World Miss University Nepal 2009.
- Contestant #11, Aayusha Karki was Miss Teen Nepal 2007 and World Miss University Nepal 2007.
- Contestant #12, Richa Thapa Magar Miss Culture, Miss Personality in Miss Teen Nepal 2003, Most Outstanding Student in VOW Top 10 College Women competition in 2007 & competed at Miss Tourism Queen Int'l 2009.
- Contestant #14, Kunchhang Moktan Tamang was Miss Tourism Queen Nepal 2007 & Top 20 Miss Teen Nepal 2006.
- Contestant #15, Akriti Shrestha was Top 10 Miss University Nepal 2007
