= Santaan (1987 film) =

1987 Nepalese film directed by Prakash Thapa

- संतान
- Directed by: Prakash Thapa
- Written by: K.B. Lamichhane; Prakash Thapa
- Screenplay by: Prakash Thapa
- Story by: K.B. Lamichhane
- Produced by: Tika Singh
- Starring: Bhuwan K.C.; Karishma Manandhar; Gauri Malla; Arjun Jung Shahi; Shanti Maskey; Kristi Mainali
- Cinematography: Manjukumar Shrestha
- Edited by: Ashok Nayak
- Music by: Manohari Singh
- Production company: Om Productions
- Release date: November 30, 1987 (Nepal)
- Running time: 138 min
- Country: Nepal
- Language: Nepali

Santaan (Nepali: संतान, Offspring) is a Nepalese social family drama film released on 30 November 1987. The film was directed by Prakash Thapa and produced by Tika Singh under the banner of Om Productions in collaboration with the Royal Nepal Film Corporation. It features an ensemble cast including Bhuwan K.C., Shanti Maskey, and Gopal Raj Mainali, while serving as the landmark acting debut for prominent Nepalese actresses Karishma Manandhar and Gauri Malla, as well as actor Arjun Jung Shahi.

The film is widely regarded as a massive critical and commercial success, defining the "golden era" of early Nepalese cinema in the late 1980s. It is celebrated for its deep narrative exploration of filial duty, intergenerational conflicts, and traditional family structures in Nepalese society.

== Plot ==
The movie centers around traditional Nepalese family dynamics, focusing heavily on the expectations parents have of their children (santaan) and the emotional trials they face when those bonds are strained by modern ambitions or differing societal values.

== Cast ==
The cast of Santaan includes a mixture of legendary theatre veterans and debutants who went on to become superstars of Nepalese cinema:

- Bhuwan K.C.
- Karishma Manandhar (credited as Karishma K.C., in her debut film role)
- Gauri Malla (in her debut film role)
- Arjun Jung Shahi (in his debut film role)
- Shanti Maskey
- Kristi Mainali
- Basundhara Bhusal
- Gopal Raj Mainali
- Ujjwal Ghimire
- Riddhi Charan Shrestha

== Soundtrack ==
The film's musical score was composed by veteran music director Manohari Singh. The tracks featured lyrics written by prominent lyricists Kiran Kharel and Prembinod Nandan, with playback vocals delivered by highly celebrated South Asian and Nepalese artists:

- Udit Narayan Jha
- Sushma Shrestha
- Prakash Shrestha
- Prasad Shrestha
- Deepa Jha

== Production ==
Santaan holds a distinct place in Nepalese film production history. According to graphic design veteran Sundar Shrestha, the marketing campaign for Santaan marked the first time a local film poster design team was commissioned to create custom promotional artwork entirely from actor photo stills in Bagbazar, Kathmandu, moving away from fully painted impressions.
