= Nepal Pyaro Chha =

2001 Nepali film by Shambhu Pradhan

Nepal Pyaro Chha (Lovely Nepal)
- Directed by: Shambhu Pradhan
- Written by: Nutan Pradhan
- Produced by: Subas Gautam
- Starring: Rajesh Hamal; Jal Shah; Ramesh Uprety; Ishwori Pradhan; Arjun Shrestha; Dinesh Sharma (actor)
- Release date: 2001 (Nepal)
- Country: Nepal
- Language: Nepali

Nepal Pyaro Chha a.k.a. Lovely Nepal (International: English title) is a 2001 Nepali film directed by Shambhu Pradhan, and written by Nutan Pradhan.

== Cast ==
- Rajesh Hamal
- Jal Shah
- Ramesh Uprety
- Ishwori Pradhan
- Arjun Shrestha
- Dinesh Sharma

== See also ==
- Cinema of Nepal
- List of Nepalese films
