= Kafle (surname) =

Nepali surname

Kafle (Nepali: काफ्ले) is a Nepali surname primarily found among the Bahun (hill Brahmin). Most families with this surname belong to the Śāṇḍilya gotra, one of the ancient Vedic lineages.

== Etymology and origin ==
Genealogical sources describe Kafley as an altered form of Kaphle or Kafle, used among Bahuns of the Pahari community, but without a definitive etymological explanation. Other speculative accounts link the name to Sanskrit Kapila (meaning reddish-brown) or to the Nepali fruit kafal (bayberry), though these explanations are not academically verified.

== Gotra ==
Most Kafle families belong to the Śāṇḍilya gotra, which traces its ancestry to the sage Śāṇḍilya, a prominent Vedic rishi in Hindu tradition.

== Traditional lineage divisions ==
According to oral traditions preserved among some Kafle families, the surname is sometimes divided into two ancestral branches known as Bāsi Kafle (बासी काफ्ले) and Sājhī Kafle (साझी काफ्ले). These divisions are based on family folklore and are not widely documented in academic or historical sources.

A commonly shared tradition states that an ancestor heated colostrum during the evening and consumed the leftover stale colostrum the following morning. Because he ate bāsi (stale or overnight food), his descendants became known as Bāsi Kafle. Another branch of the family later came to be distinguished as Sājhī Kafle. The story continues to be preserved in oral family traditions.

== Cultural associations ==
The surname is traditionally linked to the Bahun community, where bearers were often associated with priestly duties and Vedic scholarship.

== People sharing this surname or one of its variants ==
- Krishna Kafle, Nepalese singer
- Rajan Kafle, born 1979, Nepalese photographer
- Raju Kafley, born 1980, Indian film director and screenwriter
- Anup Kaphle, Nepalese journalist
- Rijesh Kafle, Nepali poet and writer
