= Dinesh D.C. =

Dinesh D.C. (Nepali: दिनेश डिसी) is a Nepali film director, film producer, film actor, TV actor, presenter, president of Cinema Circle Nepal and chairperson of the Film Development Board of Nepal. His original name is Dinesh Raj Dahal. In 2019, he was awarded Prabal Janasewa Shree award for his contribution to Nepalese society by the president of Nepal. D.C. was included in the team from Nepali Film Industry along with Rajesh Hamal in 2018 Prime Minister KP Sharma Oli official state visit to India. He worked as Station Head of Kantipur Television Network and Station Manager of Radio Kantipur.DC served as elected President of Film Director’s Guild of Nepal in 2013.

== Personal life ==
Dinesh D.C. (Dahal Chhetri) was born in Illam of eastern Nepal on 17 November. He is married to Ranu Shrestha. He was schooled at Adarsha Ma. Vi., Ilam up to SLC. He did his intermediate (I.Sc) and bachelor (B.Sc) from Amrit Science Campus. He earned a B.A. in English as a private student. He earned an M.B.A from Saraswati Campus.

== Career ==
Dinesh D.C. entered in the Nepali Film Industry as a supporting artist on Sun Chandi (1997). He then played on different roles on films like Shankar (1997), Ek Number Ko Pakhe (1999) and Muna Madan (2003). He then made his own directorial debut from Savadhan (2006). His third directorial venture Maya's Bar earned him National Film Awards (Nepal) for Best Director and D-Cine Award for Critics Choice. Dinesh D.C. was nominated in Kamana Film Award for Best Director from his next directorial venture, a comedy hit cha ekan cha. D.C.'s next directorial venture, a romantic drama Fulai Fulko Mausam Timilai (2016) was his first film as a producer.

=== Movie ===
- 2012 Maya's Bar
- 2014 Chha Ekan Chha
- 2016 Fulai Fulko Mausam Timilai (फूलैफूलको मौसम तिमीलाई ).

=== Television ===
- Kasto Lagyo
- Yastai Huncha
- Dashain Ko Chyangra
- Bihe Ko Kura
- Doshi Ko?
- Mamata
- Hijo Aaja Ko Kura
- Kati Saphal Kati Asaphal
- Chetana
- Umer 65
- Kathai
- Lakshya
- Biman Chalak
- Raag Biragam
- Ashmita
- Bhumika
- Twakka Tukka Returns

=== Documentary ===
- Enchanting Pokhara
- RNAC: An Introduction
- An Introduction for Hotel Management College
- Mukti Bal Ashram

=== Anchor ===
He has worked as an anchor for entertainment programs and award shows.

== Awards ==
(dates in Bikram Sambat)

- Geetanjali cine awards "best villain-2055" - film "sagun"
- Kalliwood cine award "best newcomer actor-2055" - film - "gham chhaya"
- Kantipur outstanding performance award - 2056
- Best debutant director –2064 saabadhan
- Hari tara purashkar - 2069
- Critics award - chhaya chhabi digital cinema awards - 2070 - film "maya's bar"
- Most popular director of the year - box office award - 2070 - film "chha ekan chha"
