= Basanti (2000 film) =

- VCD Cover
- Directed by: Neer Shah
- Based on: Basanti by Diamond Shumsher Rana
- Produced by: Neer Shah
- Starring: Rajesh Hamal; Karishma Manandhar; Gauri Malla; Divya Dutta
- Cinematography: Raju Thapa
- Edited by: Narendra Khadka
- Music by: Sambhujeet Baskota
- Production company: New Century Pictures
- Release date: 2000 (Nepal)
- Country: Nepal
- Language: Nepali

Basanti (Nepali: बसन्ती, translation: Lady like a Spring) is a 2000 Nepali historical romantic film directed by Neer Shah. The cast includes Karishma Manandhar, Rajesh Hamal, Gauri Malla and Ashok Sharma. This movie is based on a novel of the same name written by one of the prominent Nepalese novelists Diamond Shumsher Rana, who fictionalized a love story on a historical plot. The film met with huge positive response from critics and audience with praise directed towards performance of the cast and direction of Shah. The film was a big commercial success at the box office. The film is considered as one of the best film ever made in Nepali cinema history and the best movie in the historical movie genre.

== Plot ==
The film chronicles the love story of Basanti (Karishma Manandhar), a palace maid, and Gagan Singh Bhandari (Rajesh Hamal), a Nepalese general and Kaji. The film also depicts the cold-blooded murder of Mathabar Singh Thapa, the first person to be awarded the title of Prime Minister of Nepal. The film concludes with the tragic 1846 Kot massacre, following which Jang Bahadur Kunwar (Neeraj Thapa) ascends to the position of Prime Minister of Nepal.

== Cast ==
- Karishma Manandhar as Basanti/ Meethu, Gagan Singh's love interest
- Rajesh Hamal as Kaji Gagan Singh Bhandari
- Gauri Malla as Queen Rajya Lakshmi Devi
- Neeraj Thapa as Kaji Jung Bahadur Kunwar Rana
- B.S. Rana as King Rajendra Bikram Shah
- Ashok Sharma as Silangey Dittha
- Kiran K.C. as Ghyabring
- Rajaram Paudel as Khadananda Baje
- Pawan Mainali as Dambar Bahadur Bista
- Subhadra Adhikari as Mishri Aama
- Sabita Gurung as Janaki, Meethu's mother
- Bishnu Bhakta Phuyal as Meethu's father
- Neer Shah as Ustad
- Madan Das Shrestha as Baajumaan
- Manju Shrestha as Silangey's wife
- Niruta Singh (Special appearance in song "Fagu Ho")

== Song ==
The Song 'Fagu Ho Fagu Ho' is one of the most popular Holi Song in Nepal. All the songs were composed by Sambhujeet Baskota and the lyrics were penned by Neer Shah.

No.	Title	Singer(s)	Lyrics
1.	"Meri Basanti Pyaari Basanti"	Swaroop Raj Acharya	Neer Shah
2.	"Nithuri Hajoor"	Devika Bandana (Pradhan)	Neer Shah
3.	"Fagu Ho Fagu Ho"	Gyanu Rana, Lochan Bhattarai	Neer Shah
4.	"Jhankar"		Neer Shah
5.	"Mukh Mohini (Jhankar)"		Neer Shah

== See also ==
- Cinema of Nepal
- List of Nepalese films
- Seto Bagh
