= Aama (1964 film) =

1964 Nepali film by Hira Singh Khatri

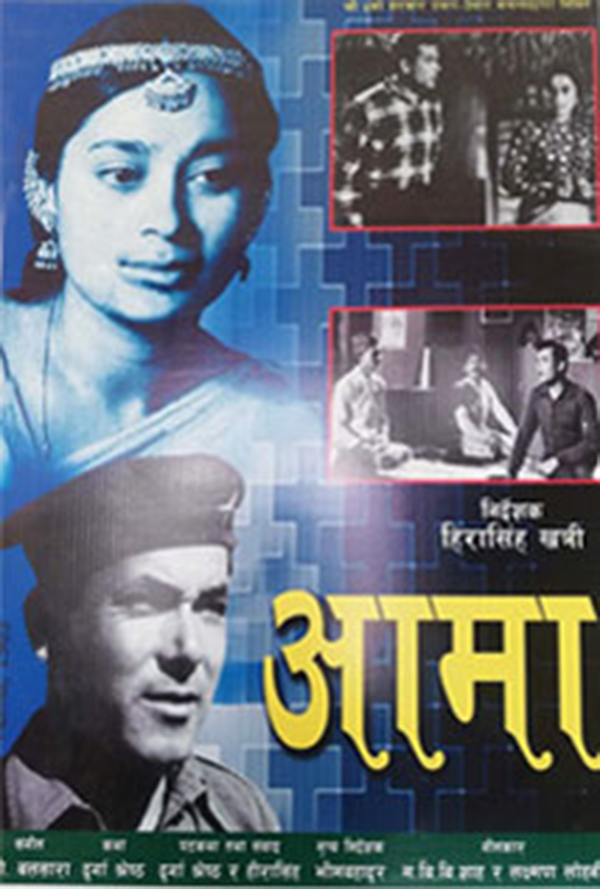
- Nepali: आमा
- Directed by: Hira Singh Khatri
- Written by: Durga Shrestha; Chaitya Devi
- Screenplay by: Upendra
- Produced by: Ministry of Education and Culture, Nepal Government
- Starring: Shiva Shankar Manandhar; Bhuwan Thapa (Chand); Hari Prasad Rimal; Basundhara Bhusal; Chaitya Devi
- Music by: W Balsara (Title song by Shiva Shankar Manandhar and Nati Kaji)
- Release date: October 7, 1964 (Nepal)
- Running time: 123 minutes
- Country: Nepal
- Language: Nepali

Aama (Nepali: आमा, lit. 'Mother') is a 1964 Nepali drama film directed by Hira Singh Khatri in his directorial debut. The film is written by Durga Shrestha and Chaitya Devi. Aama was produced by King Mahendra of Nepal under the banner of Information Department of Government of Nepal (formally Royal Nepal Film Corporation). The film stars Shiva Shankar Manandhar and Bhuwan Chand, with Basundhara Bhusal, Chitya Devi Singh, Hira Singh Khatri and Hari Prasad Rimal, in supporting roles. It follows a young man who returns home after serving in his country's army.

Hira Singh Khatri, was requested by King Mahendra of Nepal to direct Aama. The film's post-production and indoor filming were mainly done in Kolkata, India. It was released on 7 October 1964. After the release, Aama became the first Nepalese film to be produced in Nepal.

After the film's release in Nepal, it quickly became popular in the country. After the success of Aama, Khatri directed the films Hijo Aaja Bholi (1967), and Parivartan (1971) for the Nepalese government, both of which were used to convey patriotism to Nepalese citizens. Aama is the first movie ever produced in Nepali Language and regarded as one of the most important films in the history of Nepalese cinema.

== Plot ==
Harka Bahadur is an alcoholic who physically abuses his wife. One day later, his house is being repossessed due to non-payment of loan repayments, after which Harka Bahadur promises his wife he will give up drinking. Later that day, he returns to his house drunk and starts attacking his wife but dies after being struck by lightning. After his death, Harka's son Man Bahadur (Shiva Shankar Manandhar) leaves his house to join the army.

A few years later, Man Bahadur returns home after serving in a foreign army for couple of years but cannot find his mother. After hearing about his mother's death, Man Bahadur decides to leave Nepal but his neighbours persuade him to stay in the village and serve the community, saying that "service to the motherland is equally virtuous as service to a mother". Man Bahadur says he will remain in Nepal to help his country's growing economy.

== Cast ==
Credits adapted from Films Of Nepal.

- Shiva Shankar Manandhar
- Bhuwan Chand
- Basundhara Bhusal
- Hari Prasad Rimal
- Uttam Nepali
- Ustad Bhairab Bahadur Thapa

== Production ==
Mahendra of Nepal requested prominent film director Hira Singh Khatri, who was mainly working in Indian cinema, to direct Aama, which was made to develop Nepali cinema and to promote Nepali art and culture through it. In the early years of Nepalese cinema there was no professional infrastructure in the country to produce, distribute, and present Nepalese cinema. There were no professional actors so the director chose Nepalese singer-songwriter Shiva Shankar Manandhar and theatrical performer Bhuwan Chand. Shiva Shankar Manandhar was chosen to play the lead actor in the film because the director's original choice for the role was home sick. The leading female actor Bhuwan Chand remembered being "very excited" about acting in the film; she said it "was one of the incidents of my life I can never forget". At the age of fourteen, Hari Prasad Rimal also made his acting debut in Aama.

Filming on the project lasted between three and four months, and the post-production work, which was completed in Kolkata, India, took about six months. Most of the scenes were filmed in a single take. Bhuwan Chand was paid about 5,000 rupees (US $1 = 7.6 NPR; 1964 exchange rate). Chand told Kathmandu Craze, "the director of the film had asked for cameramen's opinion and he responded in my favour. So it was cameraman Dev and of course the director who were responsible for me receiving the part."

== Release ==
The film premiered on 7 October 1964, in the Jayanepal Cinema Hall, Kathmandu Valley. Upon release, the film met with success. Sunita of Films Of Nepal wrote, "Aama" took the nation by storm". After the success of the film, director Hira Singh Khatri went on to direct Hijo Aaja Bholi (1967), and Parivartan (1971), films which were used to convey patriotism to Nepalese citizens. Aama became an important film in history of Nepalese cinema, after becoming the first Nepalese film to be produced in Nepal. Following its release, the leading actors became publicly prominent. Kathmandu Films, wrote "This [Aama] was the most important event in history of filming in Nepal".

=== Critical response ===
BossNepal wrote, "The title of the movie did justice to it ... Aama (mother) gives us a glimpse of what to expect and meets people's expectations as well. It goes perfectly with the theme of the movie". The reviewer also said, "Aama deserves a watch". Philip Cryan Marshall of Migyul wrote, "Aama was clearly a nation-building tool", and "The image of the mother, a universal symbol of national unity, was used to forward themes of nationalization. Characters ... were dressed in distinct garbs of the nation – men in daura suruwal and dhaka topi and women draped in saree and cholo fariya".
