= Jal Shah =

Nepalese actress (born 1982)

- Born: Jal Shah; 1982; Kathmandu, Nepal
- Years active: 1996–2006
- Spouse: Sharad Kumar Rimal
- Children: 1 (daughter)

Jal Shah (Nepali: जल शाह) is a Nepali actress. She started her film career with Avatar (1996) when she was 13 years old. She was one of the top actress in Nepali movies from 90s to mid 2000s She went on to act in more than three dozen films. Her last film to date was Krodh (2006).

As of 2018, she was married to Sharad Kumar Rimal and had one daughter. They were living in the United States.

Writer Prema Shah was her mother.

== Planned return to acting ==
In 2025, Shah visited Nepal to support Shiksha Foundation, a charitable organisation established by her daughter Kalash to assist students at schools in Kavre district. During a public event in Kathmandu, she said she intended to return to film acting once Kalash completed her university studies, stating that her capacity to act had not diminished during her time away from the industry and that she would return to the screen when the time was right.

== Filmography ==
Year	Title	references
1996	Avatar	
1997	Ishwor	
1997	Shankar	
1998	Ghumto	
1998	Thuldai	
1999	Nepali Babu	
1999	Ek Number Ko Pakhe	
1999	Nata Ragat Ko	
2000	Nepal Pyaro Chha	
2001	Buhari	
2001	Aashirbad	
2001	Badal Paree	
2001	Yo Mayako Sagar	
2002	Sanyas	
2003	Je Bho Ramrai Bho	
2003	Jetho Kancho	
2005	Raju Raja Ram	
2005	Krodh	
2006	Majdur	
