= Sindoor (1979 film) =

- सिन्दूर
- Directed by: Prakash Thapa
- Written by: Daulat Bikram Bista
- Screenplay by: Prakash Thapa
- Story by: Daulat Bikram Bista
- Starring: Neer Shah; Biswa Basnet; Meenaxi Anand; Shanti Maskey; Basundhara Bhusal; Gopal Raj Mainali; Harihar Sharma
- Cinematography: Shyam Mohan Shrestha
- Music by: Gopal Yonjan; Nati Kaji
- Production company: Royal Nepal Film Corporation
- Distributed by: Royal Nepal Film Corporation
- Release date: November 26, 1979 (Nepal)
- Country: Nepal
- Language: Nepali

Sindoor (Nepali: सिन्दूर) is a landmark 1979 Nepali social drama film directed by Prakash Thapa and produced by the Royal Nepal Film Corporation. Renowned as Nepal's second color feature film, it is celebrated as the first movie in the history of Nepalese cinema to complete a "silver jubilee" by running for 52 consecutive weeks in theaters.

The film's story was written by the prominent Nepalese novelist Daulat Bikram Bista.

== Plot ==
Set within traditional Nepalese society, Sindoor explores the delicate dynamics of love, marriage, and complex familial expectations. The narrative revolves around a young woman navigating societal pressures, highlighting the significance of a woman's dignity and self-determination. The film masterfully balances intense emotional and progressive social themes with lighthearted comic relief provided by subplots involving a beloved neighborhood duo.

== Cast ==
The film brought together a mixture of established theater actors and fresh faces, launching several historic careers:

- Meenaxi Anand as the female protagonist
- Biswa Basnet as the male lead
- Neer Shah
- Gopal Raj Mainali and Basundhara Bhusal
- Shanti Maskey
- Harihar Sharma
- Hari Prasad Rimal

== Release and legacy ==
The film officially premiered on November 26, 1979 (alternatively cited as 1980 in some regional release schedules). It ran continuously for 52 weeks across major theaters in Kathmandu—including the historic Jai Nepal, Bishwojyoti, and Ranjana cinemas.

Beyond domestic borders, Sindoor represented the country on the global stage when it was selected to screen at the Uzbekistan Film Festival.

In recognition of its enduring message of women's empowerment, the Film Development Board hosted a special historic screening of Sindoor in March 2025 to honor International Women's Day.
