= Nalapanima =

Musical Play

Nalapanima is a musical play (Geeti Natak) about the patriotism of a Nepalese soldier during the Battle of Nalapani in 1814 in the Anglo-Nepalese War, fought under the command of Balbhadra Kunwar. Lyrics were written by Bala Krishna ‘Sama’ and music composed by Shiva Shankar Manandhar.

== Synopsis ==
A wounded Nepalese soldier seeks help from the British camp. He is grateful for the humanitarian help he receives from the British but spurns an offer to join the British Army (Gurkha War).

== Production ==
The play was staged at the Rastriya Nachghar (Nepal). After a few years, it was staged again. The show's songs blend traditional Nepalese folk music and more contemporary music. The album also contains some duet songs sung by Narayan Gopal and his mentor Manik Ratna.

== Songs ==
1. Piyo..., piyo: (Narayan Gopal and Manik Ratna)
2. Ke har khai Ayewu: (Shiva Shankar and Narayan Gopal)
3. Chora naro: (Kamala Shrestha)
4. Haye mero pritam: (Kamala Shrestha)
5. Awu awau relimai: (Manik Ratna)
6. Ama timilai: (Narayan Gopal)
7. Chomoluma shikhara: (Shiva Shankar and Kamala Shrestha)
8. Agalagi nibhawunu paryo: (Manik Ratna)
9. Aye.. Ayen: (Manik Ratna)
10. Najawu murkha bhai: (Narayan Gopal)
11. Jana dewu aba: (Manik Ratna)
12. Huncha huncha: (Narayan Gopal and Manik Ratna)
