= Saranga Shrestha =

Nepalese actor

- सारंगा श्रेष्ठ
- Occupations: actress, producer, dance trainer
- Known for: Aago, Sindur Pote, Sarangi
- Spouse: Ramesh Karki (m. 2012)
- Children: 1 daughter

Saranga Shrestha (Nepali: सारङ्गा श्रेष्ठ) is a Nepalese actor and performer. In the early 2000s, she was considered one of the leading artistes of Nepali film industry. She was a student of Sanskritik Sansthan. She is known for her dancing. Her film credits include Yo Maya Ko Sagar, Aago, Sindur Pote and Sarangi.

== Personal life ==
She divorced her first husband, an American national, and married a non-resident Nepali, Ramesh Karki, in 2012. She lives with him in Baltimore where she teaches dancing. She has a daughter, born in Baltimore.
