= Shanti Maskey =

Nepali actress

- शान्ति मास्के
- Born: 1928; Teenpeepal, Gorkha, Nepal
- Died: January 18, 2011 (aged 82–83)
- Occupations: singer; stage, television and film actor
- Known for: Jiwan rekha, Sindur, Ke ghar ke dera, Kanchi, Pachyaura, Manko bandh, Santan, Kasturi
- Spouse: Bir Bahadur Maskey (married 1954 or 1955)
- Awards: Gorkha Dakshin Bahu, Urwasi Puraskar, Lifetime Achievement Award, Best actress award, Best character actress award

Shanti Maskey (Nepali: शान्ति मास्के;1928-2011), was a Nepalese actress who acted in more than 50 films. She was one of the first actors of Nepali film industry. She was a recipient of Gorkha Dakshin Bahu, the second highest award awarded by the Kingdom of Nepal. Her notable films include Jiwan rekha, Sindur, Ke ghar ke dera, Kanchhi, Pachyaura, Manko bandh, Santan and Kasturi, among others. She had participated in the struggle for democracy in 1951. She was a singer and a stage actor before she started her film career.

== Early life ==
Shanti Maskey was born in Teenpeepal, Gorkha in 1928.

== Career ==
She first went to Kathmandu, and then to Calcutta, accompanied by her mother, in search of opportunities in the performing arts. She acted in some stage plays in Calcutta but returned to Nepal when the 1951 revolution started. She first reached Biratnagar where she sang revolutionary songs in Radio Democracy during the revolution. After the success of the revolution, she moved back to Kathmandu. She met playwright Bal Krishna Sama for the first time in 1953-54 (Note: When only the year in Bikram Sambat is known, the year in CE has been split, since a year in BS begins mid-April.) in Kathmandu, and acted in his play Andhaweg in a theater in Singha Durbar, that same year.

Her first film was Hijo Aaja Bholi (1967). She found success with Jiwan Rekha and Sindur. She acted in more than 50 Nepali films in the subsequent decades. She also acted in Bollywood films Kissa Kathmandu and Panchvati.

She was an established stage actor before she entered the film industry. She also made her name as a singer of modern songs.

She was the founding coordinator of Nepal Cine Artists Association. At the time of her death, she was an adviser at the Nepal Film Development Board, as well as a member of the Leadership and Membership Selection Committee of Nepal Pragya Pratisthan.

== Personal life ==
She married Bir Bahadur Maskey in 1954-55, as his third wife.

== Death and legacy ==
She had gotten injured when she jumped off Narayani bridge during the shooting of Santan in 1989. She had to have a pacemaker installed after the incident, which she had had changed in 2006 and was in poor health in her last years. She had been living with Latika, granddaughter, in the latter's home in Bhainsepati, Lalitpur, where she died from complications related to her heart problem, on 18 January 2011, at the age of 83. Although she died at home, her body was taken to Gangalal Memorial Hospital to get the pacemaker removed. According to another source, she had been getting treatment at the Gangalal hospital all along, and passed away while still in care, there. She also donated her eyes.

Her body was kept at Nepal Pragya Pratisthan, Kamaladi for final tributes, before being cremated at Pashupati that same day. The then Prime minister, Madhav Kumar Nepal, Culture minister Minendra Rijal, Information minister Shankar Pokharel, CPN UML president Jhala Nath Khanal and Nepali Congress parliamentary party leader Ram Chandra Paudel were among those who paid their respects. Also attending, were Home minister Bhim Rawal and tourism minister Sarad Singh Bhandari. Among the attendees from the film industry were, Basundhara Bhusal, Bhuwan Chand, Chaitanya Devi Singh, Yuvaraj Lama and Dhiren Shakya. Prime minister Nepal said her death was "an irrevocable loss". Information minister Pokharel remembered her contributions to the country's first democratic revolution, while first actress of Nepali cinema, Bhuwan Chand said Maskey's death was like losing the mother, and Bhusal said that Nepali film had lost its "foundation pillar".

The Film Artist Association has established the annual Nepal Film Artist Association Shanti Maskey Award with cash prize of NPR 15,100 in her honour.

== Awards ==
She was the recipient of Gorkha Dakshin Bahu, the second highest honour awarded by the Kingdom of Nepal, among dozens of other awards. Some of them were:

- Gorkha Dakshin Bahu
- National Cine Artist Association Lifetime Achievement Award
- Lifetime Achievement Award at the first annual Dabur Anmol Motion Picture Awards (2004)
- Urwashi Puraskar
- Sarwotkrishta Chalachitra Abhinetri Puraskar
- Charitra Abhinetri Puraskar

== See also ==
- Bhuwan Chand
- Basundhara Bhusal
