= Fulai Fulko Mausam Timilai =

Nepali Movie

- Directed by: Dinesh D.C.
- Written by: Dinesh D.C.
- Produced by: Amir Ali
- Starring: Neeta Dhungana; Aamesh Bhandari; Vijay Lama; Hiunbala Gautam; Geeta Adhikari; Guru Kedar Baral; Madhab Raj Kharel(Madhav Kharel)
- Cinematography: mankrishna maharjan
- Music by: Suresh Adhikari
- Release date: 4 March 2016

Fulai Fulko Mausam Timilai is a Nepalese romance, drama, and comedy film directed by Dinesh D.C. The film stars Neeta Dhungana, Aamesh Bhandari, Vijay Lama, Hiunbala Gautam, Geeta Adhikari, Guru Kedar Baral, and Madhab Raj Kharel(Madhav Kharel). It was released on March 4, 2016. The movie features the love story between characters Neeta and Aamesh after they decide to break up. The audio cassette of the songs of the film was released by the Prime Minister of Nepal, KP Sharma Oli at his official residence Baluwatar. Upon release, the movie received generally mixed reviews from film critics.

== Plot ==
The film's plot focuses on the love story between Neeta Dhungana and Aamesh Bhandari. During the couple's relationship, they decide to break up for unknown reasons. Due to this, the two former lovers must forget each other.

== Cast ==
- Neeta Dhungana
- Aamesh Bhandari
- Vijay Lama
- Hiunbala Gautam
- Geeta Adhikari
- Guru Kedar Baral
- Madav Kharel
- Anurodh Adhikari
