= Jaat Ko Prashna =

Nepali talk show

- Genre: Talk show
- Directed by: Shanta Nepali
- Presented by: Rajesh Hamal
- Country of origin: Nepal
- Original language: Nepali
- No. of seasons: 1
- No. of episodes: 12

Production
- Producer: Bibek Regmi
- Running time: 25 minutes
- Production company: Samata Foundation

Original release
- Network: Kantipur Television
- Release: 2020

Jaat Ko Prashna (Nepali: जातको प्रश्न; lit. 'Question of Caste') is a Nepali talk show directed by Shanta Nepali and hosted by Rajesh Hamal. It premiered in 2020 and its premise is about the caste system in Nepal. Soon after its release, Jaat Ko Prashna ran into controversy after being found out that it was being run with help from Christian Aid Nepal. In 2021, the show was selected for the World Justice Challenge 2021.

The season two was released on 2 August 2021.
