= Basundhara Bhusal =

Nepali movie and theater actor

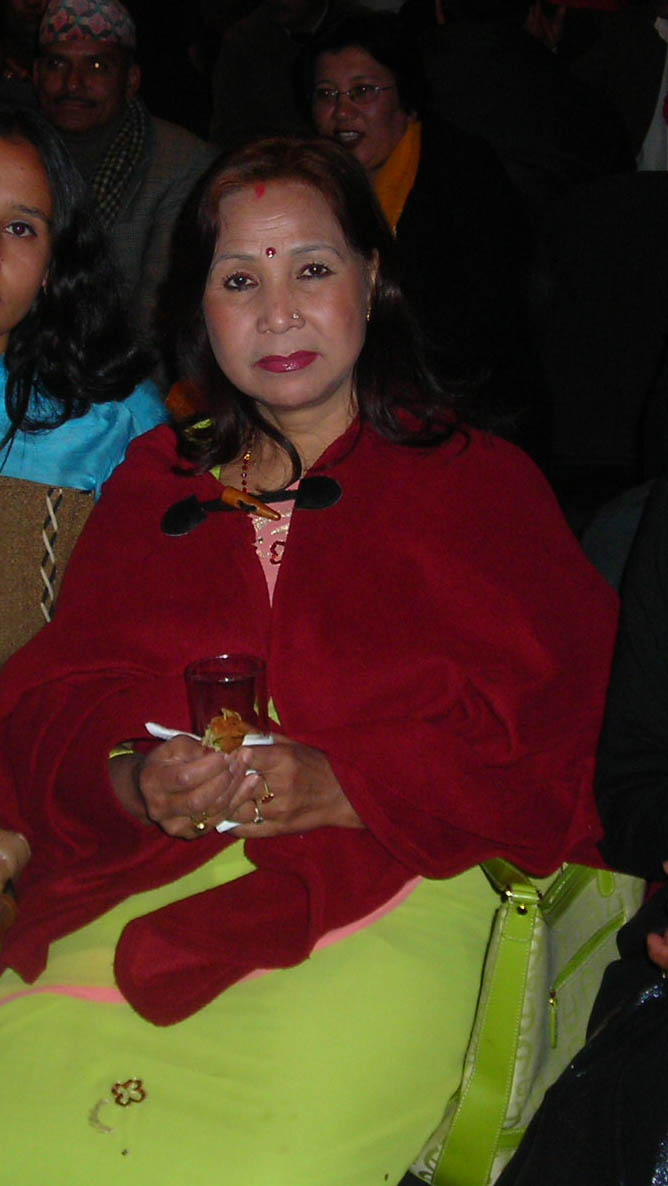
- Years active: 1964–present
- Notable work: Aama, Truck Driver, Paral Ko Aago, Chhakka Panja
- Spouse: Chet Narayan Bhusal

Basundhara Bhusal (Nepali: बसुन्धरा भुसाल) is a Nepalese movie and theater actor. She was one of the actresses in the first Nepali movie Aama (1964). Since then, she has acted in at least 135 feature films and 60 TV programs. She started her career in theater, acting in plays at the Rastriya Nachghar since the 1960s.

Some of her notable films are Ek Number Ko Pakhe, Truck Driver, Hijo Aaja Bholi (first Nepali film under a private banner and fourth overall), Paral Ko Aago (adapted from eponymous story by Guru Prasad Mainali), Chhakka Panja (second highest grossing Nepali film of all time) and Prasad (2018 film).

Bhusal received the Lifetime Achievement Award at the National Film Awards (Nepal) in 2016.

Bhusal is the co-founder and president of Bhuwan Chaitya Basundhara Foundation. She is known to volunteer for social awareness programs to help educate the public on important issues. She has spoken about gender pay gap in the Nepali movie industry.

== Filmography ==
Bhusal has played in over 135 feature films; the list here only includes a small number of them.

Year	Title	Role(s)	Notes	Ref(s)
1964	Aama			
1968	Hijo Aaja Bholi			
1973	Mann Ko Bandh			
1978	Paral Ko Aago			
1980	Sindoor			
1982	Jeevan Rekha			
1989	Santan			
1989	Pachhis Basanta			
1991	Kanyadaan		Best Actor in a character Role (Female)	
1993	Adhikar			
1994	Truck Driver			
1995	Jali Rumal			
1995	Seeta			
1999	Ek Number Ko Pakhe			
2016	Chhakka Panja			
2018	Shatru Gate			
2018	Prasad			
2019	Dal Bhaat Tarkaari			

== See also ==
- Bhuwan Chand
- Gauri Malla
- Mithila Sharma
