= Selfie King =

2020 Nepali film

- Theatrical release poster
- Directed by: Bishal Sapkota
- Produced by: Dinesh Raut; Shuvash Thapa
- Starring: Bipin Karki
- Music by: Shailesh Shrestha (Background Score)
- Release date: February 7, 2020
- Running time: 125 minutes
- Country: Nepal
- Language: Nepali

Selfie King is a 2020 Nepali film, directed by Bishal Sapkota. The film is produced by Dinesh Raut, and Shuvash Thapa under the banner of Picture Frame, and Shuvash Thapa Productions. The film features Bipin Karki in the lead role as Gopal, an actor who portrays the titular character in the TV show Selfie King. The film stars Bipin Karki, Laxmi Bardewa, Abhay Baral, and Bhuwan Chand.

== Cast ==
- Bipin Karki as Gopal
- Laxmi Bardewa as Gopal's wife
- Abhay Baral
- Bhuwan Chand as Gopal's mother
- Lokmani Sapkota as Gopal's father
- Keki Adhikari in a guest appearance
- Rajesh Bishural

== Release ==
=== Critical response ===
Abhimanyu Dixit of The Kathmandu Post wrote, "For a debut film, Sapkota has shown audacity and a lot of potential. There are moments that speak for the filmmaker and his love for the medium. For example, the film opens with a shot of a child and closes on a funeral pyre. Here’s hoping this film has birthed a space for more young, fresh minds to come ahead and share their stories. We will find perfection along the way". Diwakar Pyakurel of Online Khabar wrote, "Selfie King's strength is its story, not the making. It is a ruthless revelation of the tragedy of a comedian's life. The young director needs to improve his presentation skills to quench the Nepali audience's thirst for ‘good movies". Sunny Mahat of The Annapurna Express wrote, "Written by the director himself, the film's screenplay is extremely loose and the story unconvincing".
