= Seto Bagh =

- Movie poster
- Directed by: Neer Shah
- Written by: Based on the historical novel of the same name by Diamond Shumsher Rana
- Produced by: Manjushree Rana; Puran Rana; Rabindra Shumsher Rana; Khayati Rana
- Starring: BS Rana; Rajaram Poudel; Rabi Giri; Shyam Rai; Anjana Kattel
- Production companies: Mahashakti Multimedia; Nir Cinema
- Release date: 10 April 2015
- Country: Nepal
- Language: Nepali

Seto Bagh (Nepali: सेतो बाघ, translation: White Tiger) is a 2015 Nepali historical film directed by Neer Shah. The cast includes BS Rana, Rajaram Poudel, Rabi Giri, Shyam Rai and Anjana Kattel. This movie is based on a historical novel of the same name written by one of the prominent Nepalese novelists Diamond Shumsher Rana. Seto Bagh is set during the last days of Jung Bahadur Rana following his death and then the start of conspiracies within the Rana family with the motive of accessing the power to rule. It shows the history of the country and how they fought so bravely.

== Cast ==
- BS Rana
- Rajaram Poudel
- Rabi Giri
- Shyam Rai
- Anjana Kattel
- Sarbajit Timalsina
- Simran Khanal

== See also ==
- Diamond Shumsher Rana
- Cinema of Nepal
- List of Nepalese films
