= Prema Shah =

Nepali writer and poet (1945–2017)

- प्रेमा शाह
- Born: Girija Rajya Laxmi Shah; 29 June 1945; Shreepur, Birgunj, Nepal
- Died: 20 December 2017 (aged 72); Intermountain Healthcare, Salt Lake City, Utah, United States
- Education: Tribhuvan University
- Occupations: Writer, poet, lecturer
- Notable work: Pahenlo Gulaph; Vishayantara
- Spouses: JP Shahi (divorced) RM Karmacharya (divorced)
- Children: Jal Shah

Girija Rajya Laxmi Shah (29 June 1945 – 20 December 2017), professionally known as Prema Shah, was a Nepalese poet, lecturer and short-story writer. She is considered one of the foremost Nepalese writer of the twentieth century.

== Early life and education ==
She was born on 29 June 1945 (16 Ashadh 2002 BS) to father Purnendra Bikram Shah and mother Aruna Shah in Shreepur, Birgunj. On the fourteenth day of her birth, she was taken to her maternal home in Kathmandu, where she grew up. His maternal grandfather Bigyan Shumsher JBR was a General at that time. Prema Shah's childhood and childhood were spent under the care and upbringing of General Rana. She was also involved in the art of singing and dancing since childhood. She was raised by Tulsi Devi Upadhyay Koirala, her nanny.

She was initially homeschooled. After some education at home, she was directly admitted to the sixth grade at Patan High School. After studying at Patan High School for a year, the morning classes of the school was shifted to Madan Memorial School. Then she started going to Madan Memorial School. And then she was admitted to Tri-Padma School in Patan. She was then taken to Adarsh Kanya Niketan in Mangalbazar, Patan. She completed her SLC in 2016 BS (1959–1960). She then graduated from Patan College with a proficiency certificate and a bachelor's degree from Tribhuvan University. She also received a diploma in Batik painting from Banaras Hindu University. She also studied ceramics in Benaras.

== Notable works ==
List of works by Prema Shah:

=== Short story collections ===
- Pahenlo Gulaph (Yellow Rose, 1966)
- Vishayantara (Digressions, 1971)

=== Novels ===
- Aakash Bibhajit Chha (Co-writer)
- Mummy

=== Children's literature ===
==== Children's story collections ====
- Jinki ra Joker
- Mantu Bajaiko Kathako Patero
- Indra Dhanush
- Rangi Changi Kathaharu
- Ramro Kaam
- Reka Kehi Katha

==== Children's novels ====
- Rameko Katha
- Anandako Aavishkar
- Manu ra Bhangera

=== Editing ===
- Ujyalo (Children's magazine)

== Personal life and death ==
She married JP Shahi, an Indian landowner on 2 July 1971 (18 Ashadh 2028). After marriage she moved to Benaras to study. After returning to Nepal, they got divorced. She then moved to Japan to study art. After returning from Japan she married RM Karmacharya in Guhyeshwari Temple. After one year of marriage, a daughter was born. Karmacaharya and Shah divorced after some time.

She died at the age of 72 on 20 December 2017 (5 Poush 2074 BS) in Inter Mountain Hospital of Salt Lake City, Utah. Her daughter Jal Shah is a prominent Nepali actress.

== Biopic ==
A video documentary biopic of Prema Shah was released on 5 December 2019 by her daughter Jal Shah. Rajan Kafle picturized the biopic.

== See also ==
- Banira Giri
- Parijat
- Dev Kumari Thapa
