= Miss Nepal 2007 =

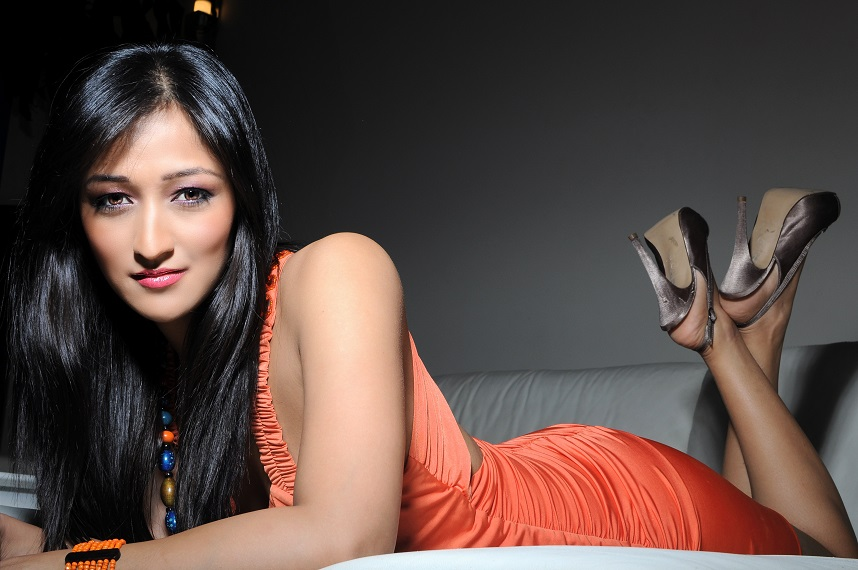
- Sitashma Chand during photo shoot.
- Date: April 7, 2007
- Venue: Birendra International Conference Convention Centre, Kathmandu
- Broadcaster: NTV
- Entrants: 19
- Winner: Sitashma Chand; Lalitpur

Dabur Vatika Miss Nepal 2007, the 12th Miss Nepal pageant held on April 7, 2007, at the Birendra International Conference Convention Centre in Nepal. It was won by Sitashma Chand, of Lalitpur.

The event was surrounded by heavy protests from Maoist and Feminist activists. The show was broadcast live by Nepal Television but suffered from minor technical glitches. The chief judge of the event, Kollywood actor Rajesh Hamal, asked the top 5 finalists, "Are all traditions to be followed without question or do they need to be discussed and amended?"

The contestants were supported by fashion designer groups INIFD, NEFT, Lakhotia and others. The event differed from previous pageants in that it featured modifications of Nepal's traditional ethnic dresses. Designs from INIFD (International Institute of Fashion Design) were judged to be better than the dresses from competing designers.

The winner of Miss Nepal 2007, Sitashma Chand, represented Nepal in the Miss World 2007 pageant in Sanya, China. The 1st runner up, Bandana Sharma, represented Nepal in the Miss Earth 2007 pageant in Nha Trang, Vietnam.

== Results ==
Color keys

- The contestant Won in an International pageant.
- The contestant was a Runner-up in an International pageant.
- The contestant was a Semi-Finalist in an International pageant.
- The contestant assumed another title.
- The contestant was not able to compete in an International pageant.
- The contestant did not place but won a Special Award in the pageant.
- The contestant did not place.

Final results	Contestant	International pageant	International Results
Miss Nepal 2007 (Winner)	(Nepal) Lalitpur - Sitashma Chand	Miss World 2007	Unplaced
1st runner-up (Miss Earth Nepal 2007)	(Nepal) Lalitpur - Bandana Sharma	Miss Earth 2007	Unplaced
2nd runner-up	(Nepal) Lalitpur - Shweta Shah		
Top 5	Kathmandu – Babita Manandhar		
Top 5	Kathmandu – Bibha Prajapati		
Top 10	(Nepal) Kailali – Reecha Sharma		
Top 10	Kathmandu – Janni Bajracharya		
Top 10	Kathmandu – Shristi Manandhar		
Top 10	(Nepal) Lumbini – Rasami KC		
Top 10	(Nepal) Lumbini – Sabitra Shrestha		

=== Sub-Titles ===
Award	Contestant
Dabur Red Toothpaste Miss Beautiful Smile	(Nepal) Kailali - Reecha Sharma
The New Era Miss Personality	(Nepal) Lalitpur - Sitashma Chand
Dabur Vatika Glow Soap Miss Best Complexion	(Nepal) Lumbini - Rasami KC
Dabur Vatika Miss Beautiful Hair	(Nepal) Dharan - Nani Maya Khadka
Sony Miss Photogenic	(Nepal) Lalitpur - Bandana Sharma
Real Miss Natural Talent	(Nepal) Lumbini - Sabitra Shrestha
Blay Miss Best Walk	(Nepal) Lalitpur - Sitashma Chand

=== Contestants ===
#	Contestant	Age	Height	Hometown	Placement
1	Nani Maya Khadka	25	1.68 m (5 ft 6 in)	Dharan	Miss Beautiful Hair
2	Reecha Sharma	19	1.70 m (5 ft 7 in)	Kailali	Top 10; Miss Beautiful Smile
3	Roji Barnawal	21	1.75 m (5 ft 9 in)	Banke	
4	Shweta Shah	22	1.72 m (5 ft 7 1/2 in)	Lalitpur	2nd Runner Up
5	Bhumika Shrestha	24	1.67 m (5 ft 5 1/2 in)	Kathmandu	
6	Manavi Dhakal	20	1.65 m (5 ft 5 in)	Jhapa	
7	Sitashma Chand	23	1.73 m (5 ft 8 in)	Lalitpur	Winner; Miss Personality; Miss Best Walk
8	Bibha Prajapati	23	1.71 m (5 ft 7 1/2 in)	Kathmandu	Top 5
9	Punam Shahi	23	1.68 m (5 ft 6 in)	Kathmandu	
10	Shristi Manandhar	21	1.78 m (5 ft 10 in)	Kathmandu	Top 10
11	Banadana Sharma	22	1.68 m (5 ft 6 in)	Lalitpur	1st Runner Up; Miss Photogenic
12	Babita Manandhar	21	1.70 m (5 ft 7 in)	Kathmandu	Top 5
13	Janni Bajracharya	22	1.66 m (5 ft 5 1/2 in)	Kathmandu	Top 10
14	Nisha Khatoon	20	1.65 m (5 ft 5 in)	Kathmandu	
15	Mamata Pradhan	23	1.67 m (5 ft 5 1/2 in)	Morang	
16	Rasami KC	19	1.73 m (5 ft 8 in)	Lumbini	Top 10; Miss Beautiful Complexion
17	Laxmi Lama	21	1.67 m (5 ft 5 1/2 in)	Kathmandu	
18	Sabitra Shrestha	20	1.68 m (5 ft 6 in)	Lumbini	Top 10; Miss Talent
19	Nilima Ranjit	19	1.65 m (5 ft 5 in)	Kathmandu	
