= Disappearance of Chhori Maiya Maharjan =

2012 missing person case in Nepal

Chhori Maiya Maharjan
- Born: 1960 or 1961 (age 64–65)
- Disappeared: February 18, 2012 (aged 51); Kathmandu
- Status: Missing for 13 years, 11 months and 25 days

Chhori Maiya Maharjan, a resident of Kathmandu went missing on 18 February 2012 when she was 51 years old. In 2021, her case was listed as one of the twelve most mysterious missing persons cases of Nepal in recent history.

== Early response ==
The Ministry of Home Affairs formed a committee on 12 August 2012 led by Gokarna Mani Duwadi, Joint Secretary of the ministry, which was supposed to submit a report within seven days.

== One year later ==
One year after she went missing, in 2013, Asian Human Rights Commission issued an appeal for a stronger investigation into the disappearance.

== Two years later ==
Two years after she went missing, in 2014, Asian Human Rights Commission issued an open letter demanding justice. On 2 June 2014, Kathmandu District Court on Monday gave a clean chit to Nikki Singh, the prime suspect accused in the disappearance. The family members condemned the judgement as partial. It was also reported that the court arrived at its judgement at 9:50 pm, while the working hours are only until 5 pm, and the judge did not grant permission for overtime work.

== Investigation ==
It was revealed that the prime suspect Nikki Singh owed Maharjan around 5 million. The investigation by the Ministry of Home Affairs stated that Maharjan was forcefully disappeared, and that there’s strong evidence of Singh's involvement.

== 2021 resurge ==
The case resurged on social media in 2021. On 31 July 2021, a Facebook page Routine of Nepal Banda posted about the then-ten year old case. It led to an upsurge in research about the case. The #JusticeForChhorimaiyaMaharjan hashtag trended for weeks in Nepal the same month. An online media presence Ukera dedicated several investigative articles to the case. It also marked attempts of cyber hacking to take down the website of Ukera.

People over social media called out celebrities Priyanka Karki and Zenisha Moktan on their involvement in the case, as Nikki Singh was Karki Singh's niece and Moktan was her sister's husband's daughter in law.

== Active campaigns ==
As of 2021, a petition was launched demanding re-opening of the case. A pressure committee namely Chhori Maiya Khoji Dabab Samuha (Chhori Maiya Search Pressure Committee) is active on Facebook.

== See also ==
- List of people who disappeared mysteriously (2000–present)
