= Ashok Sharma (actor) =

Nepali actor and director

- अशोक शर्मा
- Born: February 3, 1965 (age 61); Nepal
- Occupations: director; actor
- Years active: 1989–present
- Notable work: Truck Driver, Allare, Yo Maya Ko Sagar
- Spouse: Kiran Sharma
- Children: Ankit Sharma

Ashok Sharma is a Nepalese actor and film director known for his work in Nepali cinema. He has acted in more than 30 stage plays, more than three-dozen television serials and more than a hundred films, including as lead actor in Pariwar and Naata. As of 2018, he had made 11 films, eight of which he directed.

== Life and career ==
Sharma moved to Kathmandu in 2039 BS (AD 1982–83) and started his career on stage. With the establishment of television broadcasting in Nepal, he made his television debut in Krishna Malla's serial Chakravyuha, and gained wide recognition for his portrayal of a politician's henchman. He then appeared in serials Tadhako Basti and Raat, among others. He also acted in the feature films, Masaal and 25 Basanta.

Sharma made the 1994 film Truck Driver on credit from friends, including the cast and crew, who worked for promise of pay after the film made profit. The film went on to make substantial profit with which he cleared his debt and funded future projects. He directed films including Sita, Garib and Nirmaya with modest results. His next film, Allare, was highly successful at home; it was also the first Nepali film to be released internationally, among the Nepalese diaspora in Europe and North America. It was followed by films including Yo Maya Ko Sagar, Mitini and Andaaj. He then took a 12-year hiatus from making films.

Sharma returned to directing with Jai Bhole in 2018, then he also directed 2019 film Rato Tika Nidharma.
