= Uttam Nepali =

Nepali artist, writer, and actor (1937–2021)

- उत्तम नेपाली
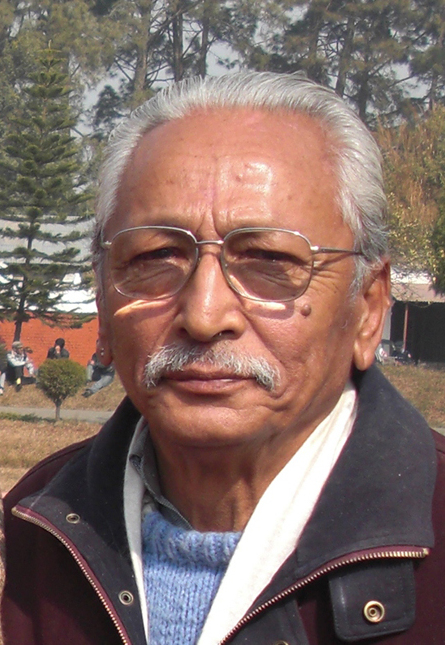
- Uttam Nepali
- Born: Uttam Prasad Karmacharya; 30 April 1937; Kathmandu, Nepal
- Died: 21 July 2021 (aged 84); Tribhuvan University Teaching Hospital, Kathmandu, Nepal
- Education: Lucknow College of Arts and Crafts
- Occupations: Artist, writer and actor
- Spouse: Mandira Karmacharya

Uttam Prasad Karmacharya, better known as Uttam Nepali (Nepali: उत्तम नेपाली; 30 April 1937 – 21 July 2021), was a Nepali visual artist, writer, and actor. A modernist painter, he was one of the pioneers of abstract art and experimentation in Nepal. He was also instrumental in establishing formal art education in Nepal. He produced abstractionist, expressionist and surrealist paintings throughout the 1960s and 70s, which were exhibited throughout Asia.

Nepali acted in two films in the early 1960s; he also published poetry. He was a lifetime member of Nepal Academy since 2000. Among his awards were National Genius Award, 2014, and Suprawal Janasewa Tritiya. He was married and had four children. He was diagnosed with Alzheimer's disease in later life. He died of cardiovascular problems in July 2021, aged 84.

== Early life ==
Uttam Nepali was born Uttam Prasad Karmacharya on 30 April 1937 (Bikram Sambat: 18 Baisakh 1994) in Kathmandu, Nepal. His father wanted him to become a businessman. However, he was determined to become a painter. He studied arts at the Lucknow College of Arts and Crafts. In 1967, he graduated from the Sir Jamsetjee Jeejebhoy School of Art, Mumbai.

== Career ==
In 1959, after completing his studies from Lucknow, Nepali returned to Kathmandu where he held an exhibition at the Tri-Chandra College. After the exhibition, King Mahendra bought many of his paintings. In the beginning, Nepali used to paint about Hindu gods like Ganesha; later, he moved towards modern art. Sometimes Nepali used to write poem verses in his paintings, especially, written by poets Bhupi Sherchan, and Bhim Nidhi Tiwari. Throughout the 1960s and 70s, he produced paintings employing modernist forms like expressionism, abstractionism, abstract-expressionism and surrealism, and incorporating traditional Nepali themes, paper and colour.

His works have been exhibited in Nepal, India, Bangladesh, Japan, South Korea, the Soviet Union, Australia, among others. Nepali was one of the first people to establish art education in Nepal. He was awarded various accolades for his work including the National Genius Award in 2014 and the Suprabal Janasewa Tritiya Award. In 2000, he was awarded to be a lifetime member of the Nepal Academy.

He acted in two Nepali films, Aama (1964) and Hijo Aaaj Bholi (1964). In 2004, he published his poetry collection titled Uttam Nepalika Kavitaharu.

== Personal life ==
He was married to Mandira Karmacharya; they had two sons and two daughters.

== Death ==
Nepali died on 21 July 2021 due to heart problems, in the Tribhuvan University Teaching Hospital. The same day, he was cremated at the Pashupati Aryaghat. He had previously been diagnosed with respiratory, heart, and Alzheimer's diseases.
