= Zenisha Moktan =

Nepalese model

- जेनिशा मोक्तान
- Born: Kathmandu
- Citizenship: Nepalese
- Education: MBA from UK
- Occupation: Director of DM Foundation
- Known for: Miss Nepal, Miss Tamang
- Height: 1.69 m (5 ft 7 in)
- Spouse: Dikesh Malhotra
- Children: Dia Malhotra, Dravya Malhotra

Zenisha Moktan (Nepali: जेनिशा मोक्तान) is a Nepalese model and beauty pageant titleholder who won Miss Nepal 2009 and represented her country at Miss World 2009.

== Controversies ==
In 2012, Moktan was accused of supporting Nikki Singh, her mother-in-law's sister, who was also a prime suspect in the disappearance of Chhori Maiya Maharjan. She wrote in an Instagram post that she was not involved in the case.

Awards and achievements
Preceded by Sitashma Chand	Miss Nepal World; 2009	Succeeded by Sadichha Shrestha
