= Hari Prasad Rimal =

Nepali actor

- Born: September 20, 1925; Lalitpur, Nepal
- Died: August 31, 2018 (aged 93); Baneshwor, Kathmandu
- Education: Durbar High School

Hari Prasad Rimal (Nepali: हरि प्रसाद रिमाल, born September 20, 1925; died August 31, 2018 ) sometimes known as the "father of Nepali Radio drama" was a Nepalese actor, singer and film director. He is known for being the first person to sing on Radio Nepal and he has acted on Nepal's first film Aama.

Rimal recorded "Mann Tukra Bhayera Aakhaako Baato Bahanechha" written by Shankar Lamichhane on Radio Nepal in 1950/51 and became the first singer of Radio Nepal. Rimal has appeared in many Nepalese movies including Aama, Man Ko Bandh, K Ghar Ke Dera and among others.

== Personal life ==
Rimal was born on September 20, 1925, in Lagantole, Lalitpur, Nepal. He was the third child to Ghana Shyam Rimal and Mohan Kumari Rimal. His father was known for his singing abilities and his brothers were poets. Rimal died on August 31, 2018, in Baneshwor, Kathmandu at age 93. Before his death he was suffering from lungs infection.

== Filmography ==
List of film performances
Year	Title	Notes
1964	Aama	First Nepalese film and debut film of Rimal.
1971	Parivartan	
1998	Man Ko Bandh	
1980	Sindoor	
1985	Ke Ghar Ke Dera	
1987	Santaan	
1990	Pirati	
1993	Chokho Maya	
1994	Jwala	

== Awards ==
- Bhakta Raj Acharya Pratishthan (honour)
