= Sitashma Chand =

Nepalese model

- सिताश्मा चन्द
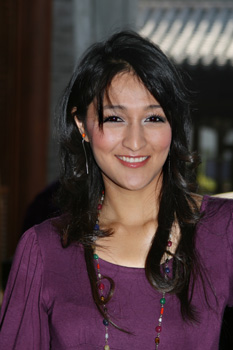
- Born: October 31, 1983 (age 43); Kathmandu, Nepal
- Citizenship: Nepal
- Education: Bachelor
- Known for: Miss Nepal 2007
- Height: 1.73 m (5 ft 8 in)
- Spouse: Benjamin Zachary Price (2013-present)

Sitashma Chand (Nepali: सिताश्मा चन्द; born October 31, 1983) is a Nepalese model and beauty pageant title holder who was crowned Miss Nepal in Kathmandu on April 7, 2007. She represented Nepal at Miss World 2007.

== Personal life ==
Sitashma Chand was born in Kathmandu on October 31, 1983. She studied at St. Mary Girl's High School, Kathmandu. She went on to study in Bangalore, India and returned to Kathmandu to finish her bachelor's degree from St. Xavier's College where she captained the girls' basketball team.

She later joined Rato Bangla women's club. It was under her captainship that the team won two national championships in 2004 and 2005.

She then moved to Dubai in 2008 to pursue a career as a flight attendant. After 12 years of working as a flight attendant with Emirates, Sitashma is currently working as a real estate agent in Dubai.

Sitashma married Benjamin Zachary Price from Australia in February 2013. They have a son together.

Awards and achievements
Preceded by Sugarika KC	Miss Nepal World; 2007	Succeeded by Zenisha Moktan
