= Deepak Rayamajhi =

Nepalese film director

- Born: 7 May 1958; Tansen, Palpa, Nepal
- Died: 18 October 2011 (aged 53); Kathmandu, Nepal
- Occupations: Director, Producer
- Spouse: Jyoti Rayamajhi
- Children: Heemani Rayamajhi; Deepali Rayamajhi

Deepak Rayamajhi (Nepali: दीपक रायमाझी) (7 May 1958 – 18 October 2011) was a Nepalese film director and producer known for his work in Nepali cinema. His early directorial career consisted of acclaimed movies, such as Bhagya Rekha, Yug Dekhi Yug Samma and Kassam. Deepak introduced a new generation of unknown young actors to the movie audiences, including Rajesh Hamal, Ramesh Upreti and Melina Manandhar. He was known as the Godfather of Nepalese Film Industry.

Deepak Rayamajhi was born on 7 May 1953 to Keshar Jung Rayamajhi and Tarulatha Rayamajhi. His father, a Nepalese politician, was a leading figure in the communist movement in the country but later turned into a royalist. His mother was an Education Minister during the Panchayat regime. Deepak was the first born of the four children born to Keshar Jung Rayamajhi. His younger brothers are Dilip Jung Rayamajhi (Ex-Brigadier General of the Nepalese army) and Raju Jung Rayamajhi. He also has younger sister; Banita Rayamajhi-Panday.

Deepak went to Moscow, Russia, with his father at the age of 8 and did his schooling there. He received his master's degree in Filmmaking from Gerasimov Institute of Cinematography.
