= Rajan Kafle =

Nepalese photographer (born 1979)

Rajan Kafle राजन काफ्ले
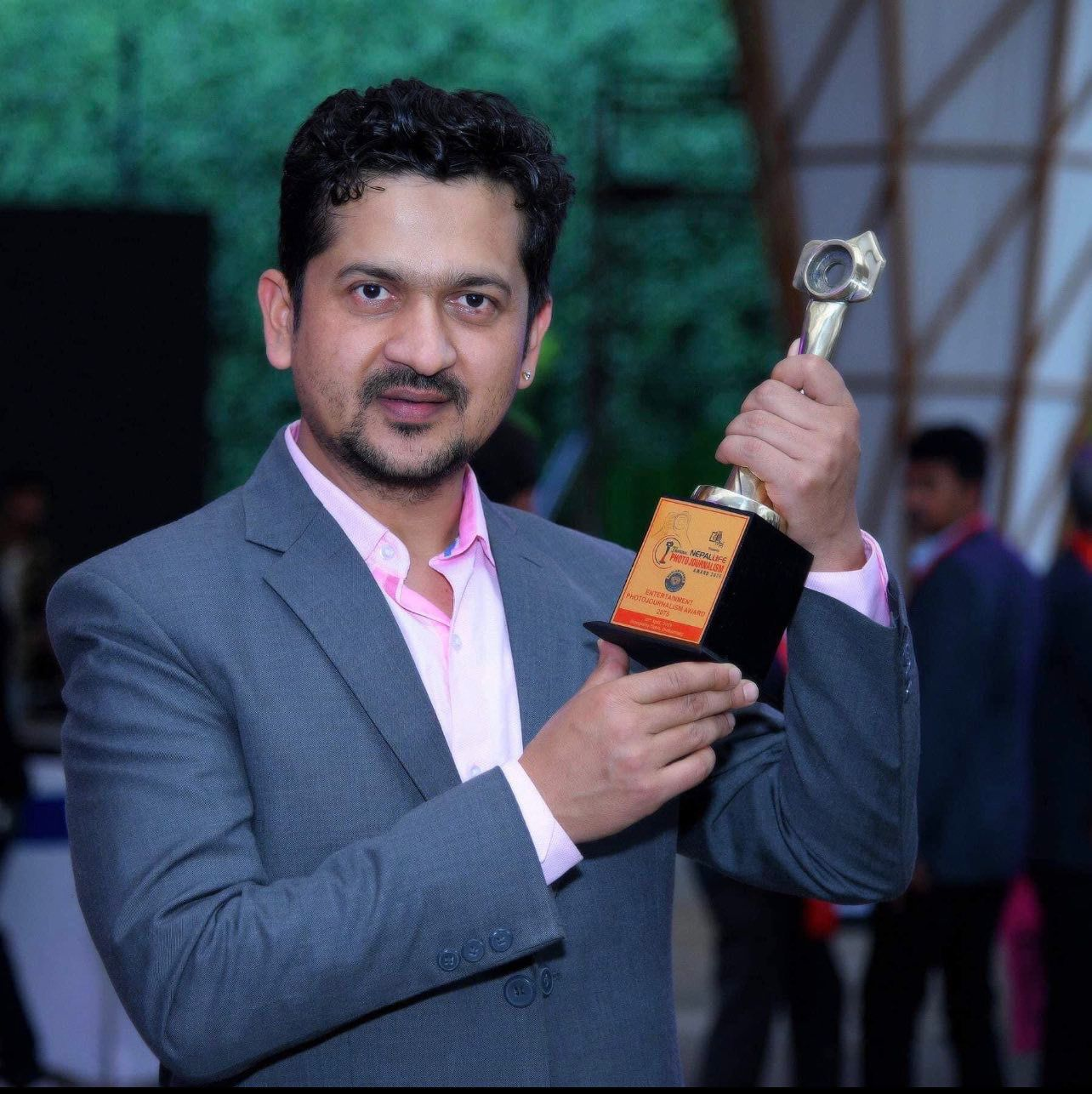
- Kafle after receiving the NFPJ Entertainment Photojournalism Award in 2018.
- Born: 11 June 1979 (age 47); Putalibazar, Syangja, Nepal
- Known for: Photojournalism, photography training
- Awards: Outstanding Youth Photojournalism Award
- Website: www.rajankafle.com

Rajan Kafle (Nepali: राजन काफ्ले; born June 11, 1979) is a Nepalese photographer. He is a photojournalist, visual storyteller and educator who commenced his career in video journalism amidst Nepal’s mass Democratic movement in 2006, a period of significant national transformation. He started his journey as a video journalist from Nepal television film-based program Hitmix. Before diving into photography, he spent decades in videography.

== Early life and career ==
Kafle was born in Putalibazar, Syangja, located in the central hilly region of Nepal. He completed his school-level education at Tribhuvan Adarsha High School located in his hometown. Later, he moved to Chitwan to start college and then moved to Kathmandu to pursue a Bachelor of Arts. Having been an Official Photographer for Nepal’s Prime Minister's Office from November 2019 to July 2021 during the ruling of the then Prime Minister KP Sharma Oli, Kafle, is a lifetime member of National Forum of Photo Journalists (NFPJ). Throughout his career, Kafle has contributed to various notable online and print media outlets including Nepal television, Channel Nepal television and Kantipur television. His photography spans diverse genres, excelling in arts, sports and landscape categories. Kafle is also active in photography training.

Kafle served as a Multimedia Coordinator at Nepalese Fashion Home from March 2004 to July 2013 where he videotaped auditions and final events of beauty pageants like Miss News, Miss Little Newa etc. From 2005 to 2013, he worked as a cameraman and reporter for the film based television program Rajatpat that aired for a decade on Kantipur television. Beside this, he also conducted interviews with prominent Nepali film personalities and artists. He worked as a contractor photographer/videographer for the Film Development Board of Nepal from 2005 to 2019, where he was the official videographer for Nepal's first National Film Award in 2005, as well as subsequent awards in 2013 and 2014, and the official photographer for 2016, 2017, and 2018.

From April 2006 to October 2008, he worked as a cameraperson in Nepal television where he captured footage of the 2006 demonstrations against the king’s autocracy. Kafle, at the time served as a stringer cameraman for NTV and filmed for popular film based programs Hamro Cinema and Hitmix. From July 2007 to July 2012, he worked as a cameraperson and reporter in Channel Nepal television for the daily program M3 and TV programs like Parda, Jyotis Bigyan, Ghumgham and Saptarangi. His career took a significant turn when he got appointed as the photography officer at the Office of the Prime Minister and Council of Ministers of Nepal where he was a sole photographer responsible for documenting daily formal programs, managing live video telecast, updating the prime minister’s personal website and social media platforms. This pivotal position showcased his exceptional talent and solidified his reputation in the field. Photographs captured by Rajan then are also used at present as file photos in news and political features.

== Career in Nepalese TV Industry ==
Rajan Kafle brought his cinematographic expertise to the forefront in several Nepali TV programs leaving an indelible mark on the Nepalese television industry.

TV Program	Year	Aired On
Lakshya	2002	Nepal Television
Hamro Cinema	2005	Nepal Television
Parichaya	2005	Nepal Television
Jire Khurshani	2007	Nepal Television
Meri Bassai	2008	Nepal Television
M3	2008	Channel Nepal
Rajatpat	2008	Kantipur Television
Parda	2010	Nepal Television
Na Lekheyako Saino	2004	Kantipur Television

== Cinematography ==
Rajan Kafle has also picturized a few documentary films offering unique insights into various facets of Nepali society and culture.

Documentary Title	Year	Subject
Gasifire	2009	Exploration of innovative method of producing electricity by rice husks
Mallaz	2010	Highlights challenges and success of rural irrigation project challenges and successes
Pact	2011	Revolutionary agricultural project
Beyond The Boundary	2010	Journey of Nepal's Men's Cricket Team
A New Horizon	2012	Journey of Nepal’s Women's Cricket Team
Rainbow Field	2012	LGBTIQ+ sports journey
32 Yard	2015	International journey of Nepal’s cricket team
Chaupadi	2018	Harmful tradition in Western rural Nepal about women's menstruation
Prema Shah	2019	Biopic of literary icon Late Prema Shah
Yarsha	2013	Yarsagumba phenomenon, shot at elevations from 4000 to 5000 meter

== Awards ==
Kafle has received a few awards in respect of his camera works. For his works in the year 2022, he was honored with the ‘Outstanding Youth Photojournalism Award 2079’ by Reporters Club Nepal on the occasion of the organization’s 25th anniversary. He also has been awarded with Wedding Photographer of the year Award (2013), Entertainment Photojournalism Award (2018) and Outstanding Photojournalist Excellency Award (2019).
