= Hijo Aaja Bholi =

Hijo, Aaja, Bholi
- Directed by: Hira Singh Khatri
- Written by: Shreedhar Khanal
- Screenplay by: Shreedhar Khanal
- Story by: Shreedhar Khanal
- Produced by: Department of Information, Nepal.
- Starring: Shreedhar Khanal, Bhuwan Chand, Mitra lal
- Release date: 14 February 1968
- Running time: 135 minutes
- Country: Nepal
- Language: Nepali

Hijo Aaja Bholi (a.k.a. Hijo, Aaja, Bholi) was the fourth Nepali film produced and the first under a private banner. This movie features Shreedhar Khanal, Bhuwan Chand, Mitra Lal, Shanti Maskey and Uttam Nepali in the lead roles. Shreedhar Khanal also wrote the story, screenplay and dialogues. He was also the lyricist and the chief assistant director. When Hira Singh Khatri fell ill while shooting the major portions in the studios of Calcutta, Khanal took the responsibility on his shoulders to see the work was not disturbed.

== Plot ==
Hijio Aaja Bholi tells the story of what happens today, tomorrow and yesterday.

== Cast ==
- Shreedhar Khanal
- Bhuwan Chand
- Mitra Lal
- Shanti Maskey
- Uttam Nepali
- Basundhara Bhusal
- Indra Lal Shrestha
- Hira Singh Khatri
- Pradeep Rimal
