= Chainpur, Dhading =

Chainpur, Bagmati चैनपुर
- Village development committee
- Location in Nepal
- Coordinates: 27.97°N 84.81°E
- Country: Nepal
- Zone: Bagmati Zone
- District: Dhading District

Population (1991)
  - Total: 5,931
  - Religions: Hindu
- Time zone: UTC+5:45 (Nepal Time)

Chainpur, Bagmati is a village development committee in Dhading District in the Bagmati Zone of central Nepal. At the time of the 1991 Nepal census it had a population of 5931 and had 1118 houses in it.
