= Bhola Rijal =

Nepalese gynaecologist

Dr. Bhola Rijal
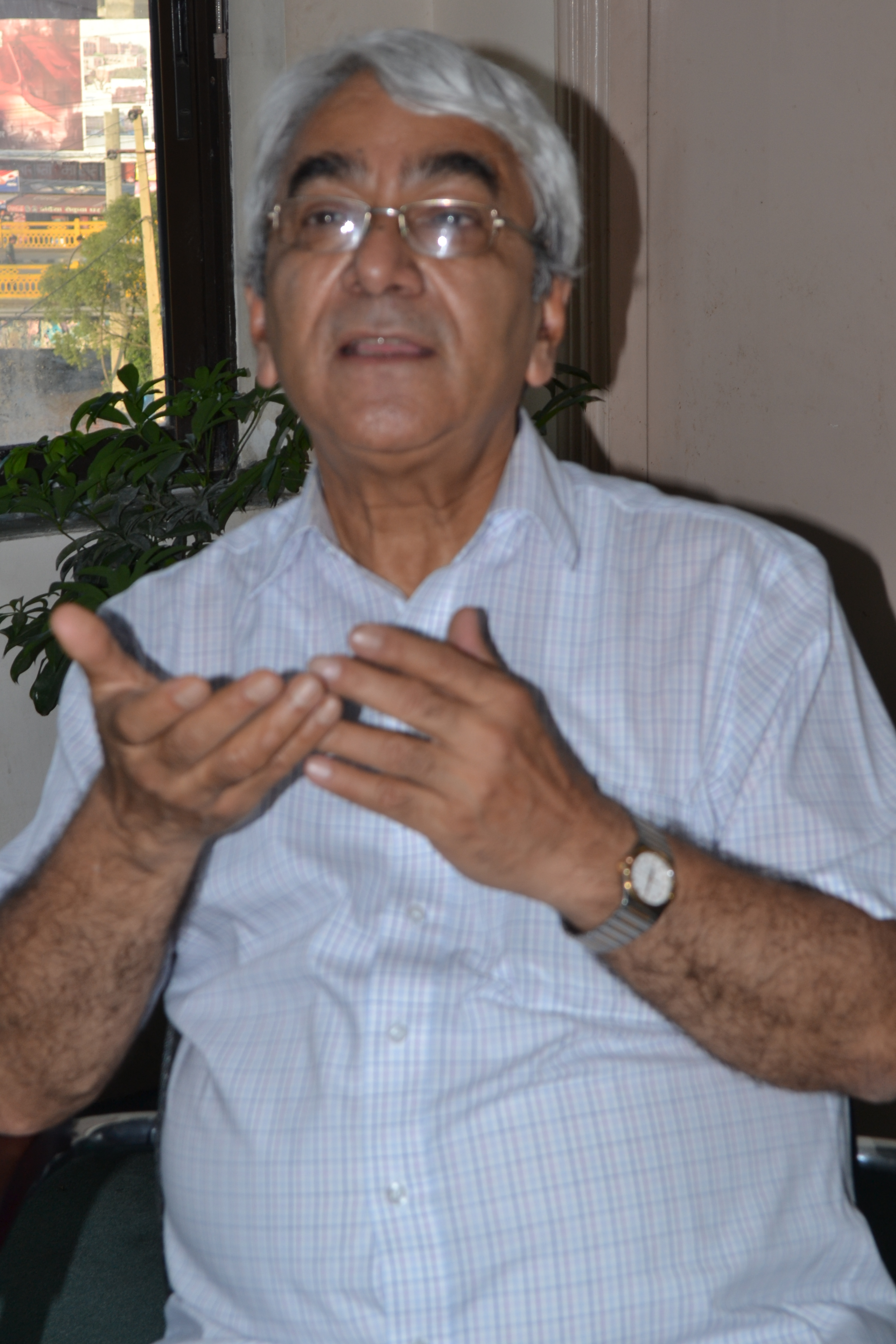
- Born: Dharan, Nepal
- Occupations: Doctor, Lyricist

Bhola Prasad Rijal is a Gynaecologist, Obstetrician and litterateur of Nepal. He is known for introducing In-vitro fertilization in Nepal. He was born in Dharan, the eastern hub of the country, in July 1948. He was chairman of Nepal Medical College. Dr. Rijal has pioneered In-vitro fertilization in Nepal a major treatment for infertility. He is also the initiator for legalizing abortion in Nepal. Alongside his medical profession, Dr Rijal’s patriotism is reflected in his literatures and outstanding song writing ability, which has made him a renowned lyricists and singer in Nepal. He also participated in Melancholy, a song by 365 Nepali renowned singers and musicians. This song was recorded in a single day on 19 May 2016 at Radio Nepal Studio, Kathmandu on Nipesh DHAKA's lyrics, Music and direction.
