= Ko Banchha Crorepati =

Nepali television game show

- Also known as: KBC
- Genre: Quiz show
- Created by: David Briggs; Mike Whitehill; Steven Knight
- Directed by: Aman Pratap Adhikary
- Presented by: Rajesh Hamal
- Composers: Keith Strachan; Matthew Strachan; Ramon Covalo; Nick Magnus
- Country of origin: Nepal
- Original languages: Nepali; English
- No. of seasons: 1
- No. of episodes: 52

Production
- Production locations: Santinagar, Prayag Marg; Chyasal, Lalitpur
- Cinematography: Pramod Karki
- Camera setup: Multi-camera
- Running time: 60 minutes

Original release
- Network: AP1TV
- Release: 3 February – 3 June 2019

Ko Banchha Crorepati (Who Wants to be a Millionaire; also simply known as KBC Nepal, Nepali: को बन्छ करोडपति) is a Nepali Quiz show based on the original British format of Who Wants to Be a Millionaire?.

The show premiered on 3 February 2019 on AP1 Television. It is hosted by Rajesh Hamal and produced by SRBN Media Pvt. Ltd. Contestants can win a huge cash prize up to 1 crore (10 million) Nepalese rupee.

== Season 1 ==
=== Host ===
Rajesh Hamal, considered a national icon and prominent media figure, is an actor, activist, producer and director. The “Maha Nayak” of Nepali film industry has been actively delivering for almost three decades. His natural craze among the film audience has propelled him ahead of his time right from the start of his career in 1991. Since then, he has appeared in over 300 national and international films.

=== Production ===
The show is directed by Aman Pratap Adhikary. Director of photography is Pramod Karki.

== Guest appearance ==
=== Season 1 ===
Guest(s)	Year	Amount won	Notes
Bhuwan KC Anmol KC	2019	Rs. 320,000/-	For promotion of their film Captain.
Kumar Kattel; Arjun Ghimire	2019	Rs. 320,000/-	
Priyanka Karki; Aayushman Desraj Shrestha Joshi	2019	Rs. 10,000/-	
Dayahang Rai; Bipin Karki	2019	Rs. 10,000/-	
Ravi Lamichhane	2019	Rs. 640,000/-	

== Gameplay ==
=== Qualification ===
Similar to the original airing in Great Britain, members of the public completed a qualification quiz which opened at the start of each season at various times in the year (also known as "registration period"). Would-be contestants would send a premium-rate SMS to a designated number and answer a question by responding. Contestants would complete a series of interviews before being randomly selected from a pool of other hopeful contestants and appearing on the stage in Fastest Finger First. In order to be eligible, contestants must be residents and citizens of Nepal and at least 18 years of age.

=== Fastest Finger First ===
The selected contestants are then brought to the studio to play Fastest Finger First where they will be asked to arrange four answers into the designated order in the shortest amount of time.

=== Main game play ===
After determining the winner of Fastest Finger First, they would join the host in the "Hot Seat" to start answering a series of multiple-choice questions on their way to win the top cash prize as outlined in the table below. Along the way, the contestant is free to walk away from the game with their winnings, but if they got a question wrong, they would walk away with nothing unless they correctly answered a milestone question (highlighted in yellow) that would guarantee some winnings.

To help them along the way, much like its counterparts, the contestant had a set of lifelines available for them to use. Which lifelines were available were dependent on the format being used. They are given below:

- **Audience Poll** (or **Ask The Audience**): The studio audience would dial into a keypad what they believed was the correct answer to the question. The results of the poll are shown to the contestant.
- 50:50: The computer would remove two wrong answers from the game leaving the contestant one right and one wrong answer.
- Phone-A-Friend: The contestant could call a pre-selected friend or family member of their choosing to aid them in answering the question. Once connected, the aiding party and the contestant had 30 seconds to talk with themselves.

The complete sequence of prizes is as follows. Guaranteed safe levels, where the contestant is guaranteed this amount of money to take home, regardless of any subsequent questions they may get wrong, are in bold.

Prize levels
Question number	Question value
Question number	(Yellow zones are the guaranteed levels)
1	Rs. 1,000/-
2	Rs. 2,000/-
3	Rs. 3,000/-
4	Rs. 5,000/-
5	**Rs. 10,000/-**
6	Rs. 20,000/-
7	Rs. 40,000/-
8	Rs. 80,000/-
9	Rs. 160,000/-
10	**Rs. 320,000/-**
11	Rs. 640,000/-
12	Rs. 1,250,000/-
13	Rs. 2,500,000/-
14	Rs. 5,000,000/-
15	**Rs. 10,000,000/-**

The contestants' run ends when they either answer a question incorrectly, decide to not answer a question and walk away with their prize money, or if they answer all 15 questions correctly (winning Rs. 1 crore/-).

== Hallmark identify ==
=== Music ===
The musical score most commonly associated with the franchise was composed by father-and-son duo Keith and Matthew Strachan with Rave remix from updated from series 22 in original version - UK by Ramon Covalo and Nick Magnus.

=== Set ===
The basic set design used in Ko Banchha Crorepati was conceived by Millionaire franchise. The floor is made of Plexiglas, beneath which lies a huge dish covered in mirror paper. The main game typically has the contestant and host sit in "Hot Seats", which are slightly-modified. All chairs are situated in the center of the stage; a computer monitor directly facing each seat displays questions and other pertinent information.

The lighting system is programmed to darken the set as the contestant progresses further into the game. There are also spotlights situated at the bottom of the set area that zoom down on the contestant when they answer a major question; to increase the visibility of the light beams emitted by such spotlights, oil is vaporized, creating a haze effect.

== Top prize winners ==
=== Rajiv Jain (12 May 2019) ===
Rajiv's 1 Crore Question

Rs. 10,000,000/- (15 of 15) – no time limit

The first historical election after the inauguration of Democracy in 2007 BS was declared in:

1. 19th Magh 2014 BS(correct answer)
2. 7th Falgun 2014 BS
3. 21st Mangsir 2014 BS
4. 25th Poush 2014 BS
