= Kasam (1992 film) =

1992 Nepali film

- Starring: Rajesh Hamal; Kristi Mainali; Beena Budhathoki; Shree Krishna Shrestha
- Release date: 1992
- Country: Nepal
- Language: Nepali

Kasam (Nepali: कसम) is a 1992 Nepalese film, which stars Rajesh Hamal in a lead role along Kristi Mainali in a double role with Beena Budhathoki, Shree Krishna Shrestha, Ganesh Upreti and Jagan Shreshtha. It also features Saroj Khanal and Mausami Malla in a guest appearance role in the song "Ban Maa Phoolyo Phool". Rajesh Hamal and Kristi Mainali were seen together in this film after Yug Dekhi Yug Samma. film was " Super Hit " at the box office
