= Bhuwan Chand =

Nepalese actress (born 1949)

- भुवन चन्द
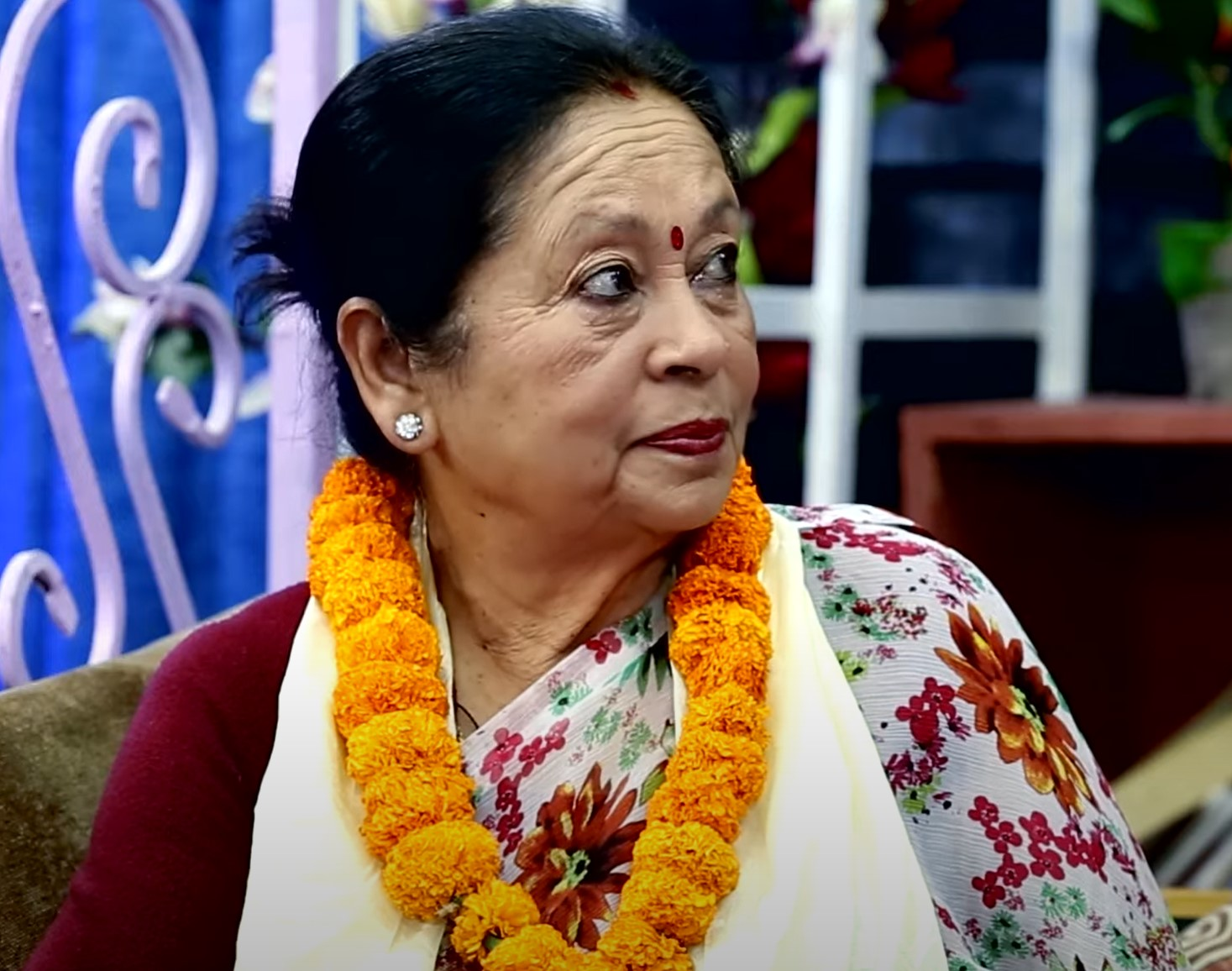
- Bhuwan Chand at an interview (2019)
- Born: Bhuwan Thapa; 14 June 1949 (age 77); Kuslechaur, Kathmandu, Nepal
- Occupations: Actress, Producer
- Years active: 1964–present
- Spouse: Michael Chand (m. 1976)
- Parents: Bhairab Bahadur Thapa (father); Gujeshwari Thapa (mother)

Bhuwan Chand (Nepali: भुवन चन्द; born June, 1949) is a Nepalese actress. She is known for Aama, the first Nepali feature film which was produced in 1964. Owing to her lead role in the first feature film produced in Nepal, which was produced by the Nepal government, she is known as the first actress of Nepal. Her other works include Hijo, Aaja, Bholi (1967), Manko Baandh (1973), Sindoor (1980), Jivan Rekha, Ke ghar ke dera (1987), Pachchis Basanta (1988) and Santideep (1989) among others.

Chand is one of the leading faces of Rastriya Nachghar, the iconic national theatre on Nepal. She is also set to receive "Extraordinary Services Award (Actress), 2019" from the Film Development Board, in its 19th anniversary celebration event.

== Personal life ==
She was born on 14 June 1949 (1 Ashadh 2006 BS) in Kuslechaur, Kathmandu, Nepal. She has received a Matric, IA and a Sr. Diploma in Kathak dance. She is the granddaughter of Late Padma Bahadur Thapa, and daughter of Gujeshwari Thapa and Bhairab Bahadur Thapa. Her father was a singer in Radio Nepal. She married Michael Chand in 1976.

== Filmography ==
Year	Title	Role	Notes
1964	Aama	Lead Actress	First Nepali feature film; Debut role
1967	Hijo, Aaja, Bholi		
1973	Manko Baandh		
1980	Sindoor		
1982	Jivan Rekha		
1987	Ke Ghar Ke Dera		
1988	Pachchis Basanta		
1989	Santideep		
1993	Kosheli		
1995	Dui Thopa Aashu		
1998	Prem Pratigya		
1999	Nepali Babu		
2002	Surakshya		
2016	Teen Ghumti		Based on the novel by B.P. Koirala
2017	Prem Geet 2		
2018	Meri Mamu		
2019	Saino		Also executive presenter
2020	Selfie King		
—	Deurali		Traditional release
—	Mahamaya		Period drama
