= Rajesh Hamal =

Nepalese actor (born 1964)

- राजेश हमाल
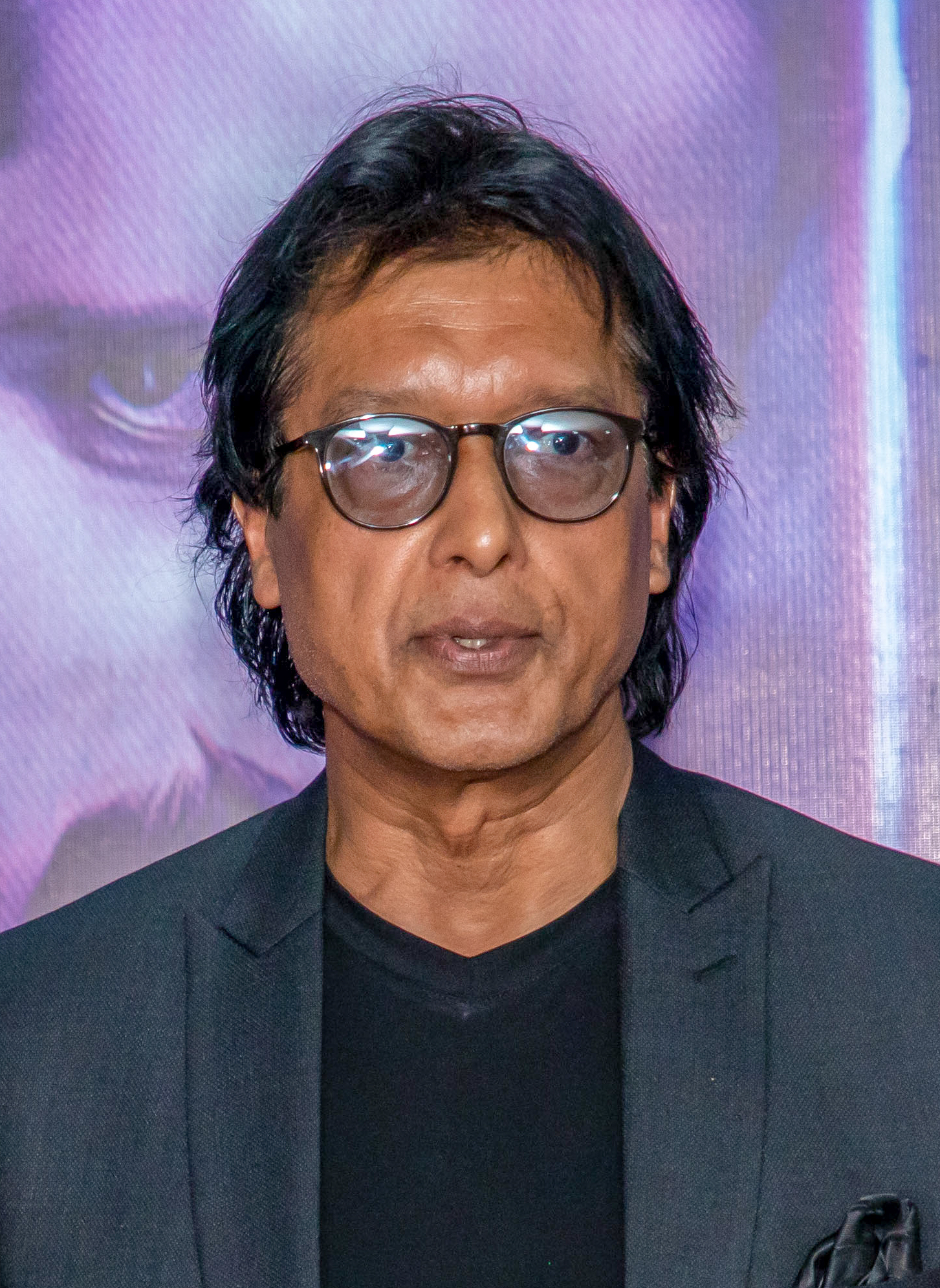
- Hamal in 2017
- Born: 9 June 1964 (age 62); Tansen, Palpa, Nepal
- Other names: Mahaa Nayak (महानायक), Rajesh Dai (राजेश दाई)
- Education: University of Delhi (MA)
- Occupations: Actor; television presenter
- Years active: 1984–present
- Spouse: Madhu Bhattarai (m. 2014)
- Parents: Chuda Bahadur Hamal (father); Renu KC (mother)
- Awards: Full list

Rajesh Hamal (Nepali: राजेश हमाल [raˈdzes ɦʌˈmal]; born 9 June 1964) is a Nepalese film actor and television presenter. Hamal began his acting career in 1991, peaking in the 1990s and 2000s. He has set several box office records in Nepali cinema, including the most commercially successful films as a lead actor, the most consecutive hits and the most awards for an actor. He has acted in more than 300 films in his lifetime. In 2025, Indian newspaper Daily News and Analysis (DNA) described him as the "Amitabh Bachchan of Nepali Cinema." Nepali newspaper Khabarhub noted that "during the peak of his career, industry insiders often remarked that a film would succeed simply by featuring Hamal's face on the poster. Producers who closely worked with him in his early days have acknowledged this phenomenon. His colleagues have also spoken publicly about the pressure producers felt to include his image prominently in promotional materials. Such was his stardom that he frequently appeared in guest roles in multiple projects."

Widely regarded as the most popular and also the greatest actor in the history of Nepali Cinema, Hamal first made his acting debut in his uncle Deepak Rayamajhi's film, "Yug Dekhi Yug Samma"(1991), which gained him national recognition. His performance in the 1992 film Deuta further established him in the industry. He has also hosted the Nepali adaptation of Who Wants to Be a Millionaire, titled Ko Bancha Crorepati ( को बन्छ करोडपति ), in 2019.

== Early life ==
Rajesh Hamal was born in Tansen, Nepal, on 9 June 1964 to Chuda Bahadur Hamal and Renu KC. His father, Chuda Bahadur Hamal, was the Nepali ambassador to Pakistan. Hamal did not communicate much with his father and told Wave magazine: "Every day of my life, I regret not bidding him a proper goodbye. Additionally, I should have made an effort to properly communicate with my father and talk about my aspirations and passion in a better way".

Hamal spent most of his childhood in Nepal and attended private school until eighth grade. Next he went to Moscow, Russia to study there. He later moved to India and graduated from the University of Delhi, completing his M.A. in English literature.

== Career ==
=== 1984–1990: Modelling, Film Debut and Breakthrough ===
Before entering the film industry, Hamal modeled for a magazine in India named Fashion Net while studying at the University of Delhi. He appeared in a fashion show organized by the Indian Embassy Women's Association in the late 1980s.

Hamal's first starring role was in Bhagya Rekha (1988), opposite Karishma Manandhar. However, Manandhar left the project and was replaced by Kristi Mainali. Filming began, but director Deepak Rayamajhi suspected an affair between Hamal and Mainali, which led to both actors leaving the project. Rayamajhi's film was successful, and he then signed Mainali and Hamal for his next film, which was Yug Dekhi Yug Samma (1991). The plot of this movie follows two young couples who are impacted by the pressure of family rivalries. Besides Hamal and Mainali, the film was the debut of producer Chhabiraj Ojha and action director Rajendra Khadgi. Hamal later told Teenz: "Actually, somewhere inside, I always wanted to act. More than acting, I was fascinated by films. I wanted something in this field, but I did not know how to begin. Luckily, my cousin was in the film industry, and he offered me a role. That was in 1990, and at that time, I did not know I would be doing films for the next 20 years".

=== 1992–2004: Superstardom and Journey to the Mahanayak of Nepali Cinema ===
In 1992, Hamal joined up with Tulsi Ghimire for the first time in his directorial film project called Deuta. The film starred Hamal, Shrawan Ghimire, Srijana Basnet, with Tulsi Ghimire in support. On the film's release, it became a box office hit in Nepal and is now regarded as the breakthrough for Hamal in Nepali cinema. The Kathmandu Post wrote: "Incidentally, this was also the film that catapulted Hamal into stardom and the movie itself has a place in Nepali Cinema Hall of Fame Award but actually the movie deserve much more than that".

In 2000, Hamal was cast in actor Neer Shah's directorial film titled Basanti. Set during the King Rajendra's rule in Nepal, it was a historical period drama. Hamal portrayed Gagan Singh Khawas. His co-stars were Karishma Manandhar, Gauri Malla, and Divya Dutta. The film is based on the novel of the same title written by Diamond Shumsher Rana. Hamal often cited Basanti as one of his favorite films.

In 2004, Hamal appeared in a Shiva Regmi directorial film named Hami Tin Bhai, which had an ensemble cast including Shree Krishna Shrestha, Nikhil Upreti, Jharana Thapa, Nandita K.C., and Rekha Thapa. In 2018, it was announced that a sequel would be produced. Other films featuring Hamal include Kasam (1992), Sadak and Prithvi (1994), Simana (1996), Shankar (1997), Chadhni (1999), Ek Number Ko Pakhe (1999), Dhukdhuki (2000), and Ajambari Nata (2005).

=== 2005–2024: Continuation of Success, Television Debut and Acting Break ===
Hamal expanded his career beyond just film, appearing on television shows and commercials in 2004. A popular Nepalese show called Wai Wai Quiz Whiz was his television debut, and he made a guest appearance on the Miss Angel Program the same year. Hamal was also endorsed by various companies to star in commercials for products such as steel, soap, and cement. He also endorsed the first bike made in Nepal, which is called "Cosmic Ying Yang". In addition, he has been the face of NMB Bank Nepal, Indica Easy, and Global College of Management.

=== 2018–2023: Music videos and television appearances ===
Beginning in 2018, Hamal opted to act in fewer movies, taking a pause in his film career. During this time, he dedicated himself to charities, social work, and youth empowerment. Meanwhile, he was modestly involved in several music videos, including Malingo, (Note: www.youtube.com/watch?v=tNDw9DG8wig) Hajur Mussukai, and Shailung (Note: www.youtube.com/watch?v=JBsUbNkPmes) by Bikas Rana, directed by Nitin Chand.

He also appeared on Mundre Ko Comedy Club and other shows as guest appearances.

=== 2024–present: Acting comeback ===
In 2025, Rajesh Hamal made come back with titled Narasimha Avtar. This marked his first comeback in the film industry after a seven-year hiatus.

=== Television hosting ===
Hamal has twice been a judge for Miss Nepal. In 1997, he judged alongside Kamal Rupakheti, Laxmi Keshari Manandhar, and Sanjaya Agarwal; the event was won by Jharana Bajracharya. Ten years later, he was the chief judge of Miss Nepal 2007, alongside Malvika Subba, and Bhusan Dahal; the winner was Sitashma Chand. In 2019, he hosted the Nepali version of Who Wants to Be a Millionaire?, titled Ko Bancha Crorepati.

== In the media ==
Hamal is often referred to as "Mahanayak", (English for "The Greatest Actor") and "Rajesh Dai" by the media and the peoples of Nepal . Nepali actress Karishma Manandhar, stated that if Hamal ran for Mayor of Kathmandu, all the peoples of Kathmandu along with her would vote for him.

In 1998, the Nepalese government honoured Hamal for his contribution to Nepali cinema. He has also received honourable mentions from the National Human Rights Commission, the late King Birendra, and Nepal's Armed Police Force. He has several honours from the Federation of Nepali Journalists. In 2015, he was honoured by then-President Dr Rambaran Yadav.

In response to the April 2015 Nepal earthquake, Hamal joined the Building Back initiative to aid in reconstruction efforts as a Goodwill ambassador.

On 14 May 2017, he was the subject of a death hoax when it was reported that he had passed away after his car was struck by a large vehicle. Hamal stated in response that "people should not misuse their right to information."

== Personal life ==
Hamal is married to Madhu Bhattarai, whom he first met at the Lux Beauty Pageant in 2004. He proposed to her on 14 May 2014 and married the same year.

== Awards and nominations ==
Year	Award	Category	Nominated work	Result	Ref(s)
1991	National Film Award	Best Actor	Deut ndanoticed	Won	
	National Film Award	Best Actor	Chatyang	Nominated	
1993	National Film Award	Best Actor	Aparadh	Won	
1994	National Film Award	Best Actor	Sadak	Won	
1994	National Film Award	Best Supporting Actor	Paribhasa	Won	
1994	National Film Award	Best Actor	Prithvi	Won	
1995	National Film Award	Best Actor	Simana	Won	
1996	National Film Award	Best Actor	Bandhan	Won	
1996	CG Digital Award	Best Actor	Chhori Buhari	Won	
1997	CG Digital Award	Best Actor	Chandal	Won	
1997	National Film Award	Best Actor	Jun Tara	Won	
1997	National Film Award	Best Actor	Shankar	Won	
1998	National Film Award	Best Actor	Chor	Won	
1998	National Film Award	Best Actor Award in Comic Role	Mr Ram Krishne	Won	
1998	National Film Award	Best Actor	Rana Bhoomi	Won	
1999	National Film Award	Best Actor	Chandani	Won	
1999	National Film Award	Best Actor	Kancha	Won	
1999	National Film Award	Best Actor	Mato Bolcha	Won	
2000	National Film Award	Best Actor	Basanti	Won	
2000	National Film Award	Best Actor	Dhuk Dhuki	Won	
2001	National Film Award	Best Actor	Nepal Pyaro Chha	Won	
2002	National Film Award	Best Actor	Sahid Gate	Won	
2002	National Film Award	Best Actor	Dhan Sampati	Won	
2007	National Film Award	Best Actor	Yuddha	Won	
2008	National Film Award	Best Actor	The Yug Dekhi Yug Samma	Won	
2009	National Film Award	Best Actor	Jay Shiva Shankar	Won	
2009	National Film Award	Best Actor	Raju Raja Ram	Won	
2010	National Film Award	Best Actor Award in Comic Role	Hath Ma Lagyo Sunya	Won	
2011	National Film Award	Best Supporting Actor	Dharmaa	Won	
2012	National Film Award	Best Comedian	Chhabilal Kanjus Chaina	Won	
2023	Award from President of Nepal	Rashtradeep Bibhushan	For his contribution in Nepali film industry	Special Award	
