= Tara Devi (singer) =

Nepalese singer

Tara Devi तारा देवी
- Tara Devi

Background information
- Birth name: Dol Kumari Karki
- Also known as: Nightingale of Nepal
- Born: 15 January 1946; Indra Chowk, Kathmandu, Nepal
- Origin: Kathmandu
- Died: 23 January 2006 (aged 61); Kathmandu, Nepal
- Occupation: Singer
- Spouse: Shiva Bahadur Shrestha

Tara Devi Shrestha (15 January 1946 – 23 January 2006), professionally known as Tara Devi was a Nepalese singer. She is known as the "Nightingale of Nepal", having recorded over 4,000 songs during her lifetime. Much of her music revolved around the themes of patriotism and love.

== Early life ==
Tara Devi was born in 1946, in the neighborhood of Indra Chowk in Kathmandu, Nepal to Krishna Bahadur Karki and Radha Devi Karki. Tara Devi started professionally singing at age seven and went on to record 4000 songs in her 40 year singing career. When she was 5 years old, she went to Radio Nepal and got the opportunity to sing. Her singing was so soulful that everyone in the crowd was extremely impressed. She was primarily involved in singing for children's programs at Radio Nepal. She was able to pursue her musical career along with her studies. She completed her Bachelors in Music.

== Career ==
During the beginning of her career, she would earn Rs. 5 per song at Radio Nepal, which eventually rose to Rs. 100 (USD 1). She was very content with her singing career and was appointed as a Kharidar at Radio Nepal, later promoted to a Secretary during her 30-year long commitment to Radio Nepal.

Tara Devi is famously termed as the "Nightingale of Nepal". Tara Devi has recorded songs of wide range of genres, from prayer songs to Nepali folk songs, most of which are regarded as classic numbers in Nepal. Almost every singer in Nepal is heavily influenced by Tara Devi in one way or another. Some of her famous numbers are; Ukali Orali Haru ma, Phool ko Thunga, Nirdosh Mero Pachhyaurima, Ae Kancha and Himal ko Kaakhama.

== Songs ==
- Subhakamana
- Yakantama Eklai Ho
- Timile Diyeka
- Timlai Hasera Bida
- Gham Ma Pani Maya
- Akha Haru Le Runa
- Bida Hune Bhaigayo
- Ghumai Ghumai
- Mero Jeevan Kitab Ko
- Maile Gayeko Geetma
- Ukali Orali Haruma
- Timra Pau Haruma
- Ma Deep Hun
- Himalako Kakhama
- Kaali Paari
- Dilma Hajur Ayera
- Sanghuri Baruli Ho
- Nyauli Basyo Tyo
- Timi Mero Hainau
- Fulako Thunga
- Mohani Lagla Hai
- Soche Jasto Hunna
- Naisaya Khola
- Phoolai Phool ko Mausam
- Jatatai Khoje
- Rimjhim Rimjhim
- Parbati Ho Naam
- Aama Bheyera

== Awards ==
- Member of the Order of Gorkha Dakshina Bahu, First Class.
- Mahendra-Ratna Award
- Indra Rajya Laxmi Award
- Jagadamba Shree Puraskar
- Chinnalata award, ’Maina’

== Later life ==
She married Shiva Bahadur Shrestha, an aircraft pilot by profession, in 1966. Later in her life, Tara Devi endured difficult periods, after she lost her 25-year-old son to blood cancer. Soon after, her husband died in an airplane crash. She was unable to recover from this tragedy and her health started deteriorating.

She became physically unfit and later was diagnosed with Parkinson's disease, which put a halt to her singing career. On 21 January 2006, she died at the age of 60. Her last album, "Afanta Ko Manma", contains her last four songs. She was survived by a son and a daughter.
