= Diamond Shumsher Rana =

Nepali writer (1918–2011)

- डायमनशमशेर राणा
- Born: 5 July 1918; Tansen Durbar, Palpa, Nepal
- Died: 11 March 2011 (aged 92); Kathmandu, Nepal
- Occupations: Writer, politician
- Writing career
- Period: 1948–2011
- Genre: Historical fiction
- Notable work: Basanti (1948) Seto Bagh (1970)

Diamond Shumsher Rana (5 July 1918 – 11 March 2011) was a Nepali writer and political activist known for his acclaimed novels Basanti and Seto Bagh.

== Life and career ==
He was born at Tansen Durbar in Palpa, where his grandfather, Sher Shumsher Jung Bahadur Rana, was governor. His father Buddha Shumsher Jung Bahadur Rana was a colonel in the Royal Nepal Army. Rana enjoyed a privileged upbringing and was a captain in the Royal Nepal Army.

In 1948 Rana travelled to Benaras, India and had his first novel Basanti published. In Nepal, he had aligned himself with an anti-establishment faction of the Rana regime and was arrested, court-martialled and sentenced to death but was later freed after members of the Rana family pressured the regime for his release. Rana later joined the political opposition and was a member of the Nepali Congress Party from 1954 to 1987.

== Bibliography ==
- Basanti (1948)
- Seto Bagh (1970)
- Anita
- Griha Prabesh
- Satprayas (Sequel to Seto Bagh)
- Pratibaddha
- Dhanko Dhabba
