= Ramesh Upreti =

Nepalese actor

- रमेश उप्रेती
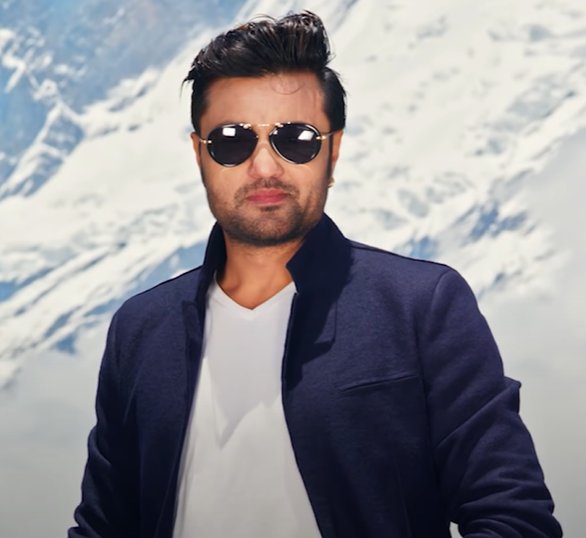
- Upreti in a music video from the 2017 film Aishwarya
- Born: March 14, 1975 (age 51); Kavrepalanchok, Nepal
- Occupation: Actor
- Years active: 1997–present

Ramesh Upreti (Nepali: रमेश उप्रेती) is a Nepalese actor known for his work in Nepali cinema. He made his debut through film Karodpati in 1997. He was one of the prominent actors of the late 1990s and the early 2000s. He eventually relocated to the United States, took a significant break from his acting career; he returned to the industry with Bracelet (2016) and Aishwarya (2017).

== Early life ==
Ramesh Upreti was born on 14 March 1975 in Kavrepalanchok, Nepal. Growing up in a traditional Nepalese family, he developed an interest in the performing arts during his adolescence. He eventually relocated from his home district to Kathmandu to pursue higher education and explore career avenues within the regional entertainment sector. Before securing his breakthrough cinematic debut in the 1997 commercial blockbuster film Karodpati, Upreti spent his early youth building professional connections and training in local acting circles, which positioned him to become one of the most prominent romantic and commercial lead actors of the late 1990s and early 2000s Kollywood era.

== Filmography ==
SN	Year	Film	Role	Director
1	1997	Karodpati	Cast	Kishore Rana
2	1997	Yo Mayale Launa Satayo	Cast	
3	1998	Dharma Sankat	Cast	
4	1998	Parai Ghar	Cast	
5	1999	Devdoot	Cast	
6	1999	Ek Number Ko Pakhe	Cast	
7	1999	Jeet	Cast	
8	1999	Kasto Samjhauta	Cast	
9	1999	Nagad Narayan	Cast	
10	1999	Pareli	Cast	
11	2000	Angalo Angaloma	Cast	
12	2000	Apsara	Cast	
13	2000	Dodhar	Cast	
14	2000	Maili	Cast	
15	2000	Maute Dai	Cast	
16	2000	Sora Barse Jowan	Cast	
17	2000	Yo Maya Ko Sagar	Cast	
18	2001	Gajal	Cast	
19	2001	Manai Ta Ho	Cast	
20	2001	Maya Garchhu Ma	Cast	
21	2001	Nepal Pyaro Chha	Cast	
22	2001	Sangam	Cast	
23	2002	Aafnopan	Cast	
24	2002	Bidrohi	Cast	
25	2002	Ghumto	Cast	
26	2002	Pooja	Cast	
27	2002	Timro Maya 99 Mero Maya 100	Cast	
28	2004	Maya Ko Jaal	Cast	
29	2009	Ghar Sansar	Cast	
30	2011	Sahara	Cast	
31	2016	Bracelet	Cast	
32	2017	Aishwarya	Cast	Diwakar Bhattarai
33	2026	Jandd	Cast	

== Awards ==
SN	Award Title	Film Name	Year	Result / Reference
1	Best On-Screen Couple (Cine Circle Award)	Aishwarya	2075 BS (2018)	Won
