= List of Nepalese films =

Despite its short history, the Nepali movie industry has its own place in the cultural heritage of Nepal. Nepalese films or Nepalese cinema refers to films made in Nepali language within Nepal and beyond. Most Nepalese films are narrative and were shot on 16-millimeter film during the film era, which are now mostly digitally captured.

The first Nepali-language film was Satya Harischandra, which was released in 1951 in Darjeeling, India, and produced by D. B. Pariyar. The first Nepali-language movie made in Nepal was Aama, which was released in 1964 produced by the Nepalese government. However, the first Nepali-language movie made by the Nepalese private sector was Maitighar, which starred Mala Sinha and was released in 1966. The first color Nepali-language movie was Kumari.

Purna Bahadur Ko Sarangi holds the record of highest-grossing film in Nepal with gross of रु 51.40 crore (514.0 million NPR). The sequel is set to release in 2083 BS. The movie collected over NPR 75 Crores at the worldwide box office, breaking multiple records and touching millions of hearts. It has since become one of the most loved Nepali films of all time.

== Early cinema (1951–1979) ==
Year	Film	Artist	Director	Producer	Music composer	Editor	Genres
1964	Aama (mother)	Shiva Shankar, Bhuvan Chand	Heera Singh Khatri	Information Dept. Govt of Nepal			
1966	Maitighar (Birthplace[women's])	Mala Sinha, C.P. Lohani	B.S. Thapa	Sumonanjali Films Pvt. Ltd.	Jaidev		
1967	Hijo, Aaja, Bholi (Yesterday, Today, Tomarrow)	Mitra Lal Sharma, Bhuvan Chand	Heera Singh Khatri	Information Dept. Govt of Nepal			
1971	Parivartan (Change)	Yagya mirth Ghimire	Heera Singh Khatri	Information Dept. Govt of Nepal			
1973	Mann Ko Bandh (Heart's stoppage)	Salyan K.C., Sushma Shahi	Prakash Thapa	Royal Nepal Film Corporation	Nati Kaji, Shiva Shankar		
1977	Kumari (Living goddess)	Biswa Basnet, Chaitya Devi	Prem Bahadur Basnet	Royal Nepal Film Corporation			
1978	Paral Ko Aago (Straw's Flame)	Tanka Sharma, Susmita Dhakal, Basundhara Bhusal (debut)	Pratap Subba	Cineroma	Shanti Thatal		

== 1980s ==
Year	Film	Artists	Director	Producer	Music composer	Editor
1980	Sindoor (Marriage symbol)	Meenaxi Anand, Biswa Basnet, Neer Shah	Prakash Thapa	Royal Nepal Film Corporation		
1980	Jeevan Rekha (Life Line)	Meenaxi Anand, Shiv Shrestha (debut)				
1981	Bansuri (Flute)	Rakesh Pandey, Rajani Sharma, Tanka Sharma, Biswa Hingmang	Tulsi Ghimire	Mohan Kumar Bannerjee	Ranjit Gazmer	
1982	Juni (Incarnation)	Bhuwan K.C. (debut), Meenakshi Anand	Sarad Palekar			
1982	Bachana Chahane Haru (Those Who Want to Live)	Kiran Thakuri, Biswa Hingmang	Pratap Subba		Shanti Thatal	
1982	Badalindo Aakash (The Changing Sky)	Shiv Shrestha, Sushma Shahi, Neer Shah	Laxminath Sharma	Royal Nepal Film Corporation	Gopal Yonzon	
1983	Samjhana (Memories)	Bhuwan K.C., Trupti Totlani Narodkar (debut), Muralidhar	Shambhu Pradhan	Ishwari Films	Ranjit Gazmer	
1984	Kanchhi (Little Sister)	Shiv Shrestha, Sharmila Malla (debut), Sushma Shahi, Mausami Malla (debut)	B.S. Thapa	Bhagawan Das Shrestha	Gopal Yonzon	
1984	Adarsha Nari (Exemplary Woman)	Bijaya Lama, Ujwal Ghimire, Amsumala Shahi, Punam Lama	Hem Lama	Hem Lama	Madan Pariyar	
1985	Ke Ghar Ke Dera (What's Home, What's Tenancy)	Puran Joshi (debut), Sharmila Malla, Madan Krishna Shrestha, Hari Bansha Acharya, Kristi Mainali (debut)	Pradeep Rimal			
1985	Kusume Rumal (Scarlet Handkerchief)	Bhuwan K.C., Trupti Totlani Narodkar, Udit Narayan (debut)	Tulsi Ghimire	Sayapatri Films	Ranjit Gazmer	
1985	Basudev [ lord Vishnu]	Krishna Malla (debut), Sharmila Malla, Madan Krishna Shrestha, Hari Bansha Acharya, Neer Shah, Harihar Sharma	Neer Shah		Ranjit Gazmer	
1986	Biswas (Faith)	Shiv Shrestha, Roshi Karki, Rajshri Chhetri	Chetan Karki	Royal Nepal Film Corporation	Gopal Yonzon	
1987	Saino (Relation)	Bhuwan K.C., Trupti Totlani Narodkar, Danny Denzongpa, Raksha Mark	Ugyen Chopel	Triple Jem Movies	Ranjit Gazmer	
1988	Anyay (Injustice)	Meera Madhuri (debut), Biswa Basnet, Prakash Adhikari (debut)	Tulsi Ghimire	Sagarmatha Movietone	Ranjit Gazmer	
1988	Jhodaa (Pair)	Banni Sharma, Tanka Sharma	Barun Kawasi	Kusulata Interprises	Ranjit Gazmer	
1988	Maya Preeti (Love and Affection)	Ravindra Khadka, Sharmila Malla, Krishna Malla	Chetan Karki	Shanti Films	Gopal Yonzon	
1988	Sahas (Courage)	Shiv Shrestha	Giri Raj Lamichhane	Trishakti Films		
1989	Behuli (The Bride)	Sunita Khadka, Prakash Adhikari	Shambhu Pradhan	Ishwari Films	Ranjit Gazmer	
1989	Bhagya Rekha (Line of Fate)	Rabindra Khadka, Mausami Malla	Deepak Rayamajhi	Surya Binayek Films	Norbu Tshering	
1989	Santaan (Offspring)	Bhuwan K.C., Arjun Jung Shahi (debut), Ujwal Ghimire, Karishma Manandhar (debut), Gauri Malla (debut), Shanti Maskey, Kristi Mainali	Prakash Thapa	Om Productions, Royal Nepal Film Corporation	Manohari Singh	
1989	Lahure (The Armyman)	Shrawan Ghimire, Trupti Totlanii Narodkar	Tulsi Ghimire	Kanchanjungha Films	Ranjit Gazmer	

== 1990s ==
Year	Film	Artists	Director	Producer	Music composer	Editor
1990	Mayalu (Beloved)	Bhuwan K.C., Karishma Manandhar	Giri Raj Lamichhane			
1990	Pariwar (Family)	Bhuwan K.C., Ashok Sharma, Kristi K.C. (Mainali), Mithila Sharma, Nir Shaha, Madan Das Shrestha, Sushila Rayamajhi	Raj Kumar Sharma	Mrs. Sumitra Poudyal	Jeevan Adhikari	Raj Kumar Sharma
1990	Cheli Beti (Girls/Daughters)	Gauri Malla, Sharmila Malla, Arjun Jung Sahi, Mithila Sharma	Yadav Kharel	Udaya Films	Sambhujeet Baskota	
1990	Pheri Bhetaula (We Shall Meet Again)	Manisha Koirala, Prakash Adhikari	Phurpa Chiring Gurung	Himchuli Films	Ranjit Gazmer	
1990	Tilhari (symbol of marriage)	Bhuwan K.C., Mausami Malla, Kristi Mainali	Giri Raj Lamichhane		Sayapatri Films	Jeevan Adhikari
1991	Bijaya Parajaya (Victory-Defeat)	Bhuwan K.C., Krsihna Malla, Brazesh Khanal, Sharmila Malla, Saroj Khanal, Rupa Rana, Teeka Pahari	Rajendra Shalabh			
1991	Chino (Souvenir)	Bhuwan K.C., Shiv Shrestha, Kristi Mainali, Sharmila Malla, Subhadra Adhikari, Sinaura Mistry, Anoop Malla and Sushila Raymajhi	Tulsi Ghimire	Om Trinetra Production	Ranjit Gazmer	
1991	Chot (Wound)	Saroj Khanal, Rupa Rana, Gauri Malla	Subodh Kumar Pokharel			
1991	Lobhi Paapi (Greedy Sinner)	Gauri Malla, Madan Krishna Shrestha, Hari Bansha Acharya	Yadav Kharel	Creative Movies	Sambhujeet Baskota	
1991	The Friend		Sanjay Pradhan			
1991	Kanyadan (Bride give away to Groom)	Gauri Malla, Bhuwan K.C.	Prakash	Samjhana Films	Manohari Singh	
1991	Sampati (Property)	Mausami Malla, Arjun Shrestha	Shambhu Pradhan	Ishwari Films	Ranjit Gazmer	
1991	Trishna (Thirst)	Bhuwan K.C., Rupa Rana, Muralidhar	Ugyen Chopel	Aarati Films	Ranjit Gazmer	
1991	Yug Dekhi Yug Samma (From Era to Era)	Rajesh Hamal (debut), Kristi Mainali	Deepak Rayamajhi	Kashi Prasad Shrestha	Sambhujeet Baskota	
1992	Arpan (Offering)	Arjun Shrestha, Bhuwan K.C., Kristi Mainali	Rajkumar Sharma	Sayapatri Films	Bhupendra Rayamajhi	
1992	Arunima [Girl's Name]	Saroj Khanal, Kristi Mainali, Karishma Manandhar, Arjun Shrestha, Mausami Malla	Mahendra Bhakta Shrestha			
1992	Chokho Maaya (Pure Love)	Saroj Khanal, Kristi Mainali, Bijaya Lama	Raj Bikram Shah	Sagun Films	Shakti Ballav	
1992	Dui Thopa Aansoo (Two Drops of Tears)	Bhuwan K.C., Shrawan Ghimire, Anuradha Sawant	Tulsi Ghimire		Ranjit Gazmer	
1992	Kastoori (Musk)	Karishma Manandhar	Kiran Pradhan	Binod Manandhar		
1992	Maya (Love)	Bhuwan K.C., Puran Joshi, Nabina Shrestha, Mausami Malla, Mithila Sharma	Pradeep Rimal			
1992	Bhauju (Sister in Law)	Rajesh Hamal, Karishma, Neer Shah, Karishma Manandhar	Rajendra Shalav	Shankar Films		Subodh Shreedhar
1992	Tapasya (Prayer)	Saroj Khanal, Gauri Malla, Beena Basnet, Karishma Manandhar	Narayan Puri	Roshana Films		Subodh Shreedhar
1993	Aandhi Beri (The Storm)	Gauri Malla, Binod Kharel	Yadav Kharel			
1993	Adhikar (The Right)	Rajesh Hamal, Kristi Mainali, Mithila Sharma	Prakash Thapa			
1993	Jhuma [Typical Nepali lady]	Mausami Malla, Arjun Shrestha	Pradeep Upadhay			
1993	Koseli (The Gift)	Trupti Totlani Narodkar, Krishna Malla, Bharati Ghimire, Shrawan Ghimire, Bijaya Lama	Tulsi Ghimire		Ranjit Gazmer	
1993	Manakamana (A Heart's Desire)	Shiv Shrestha, Karishma Manandhar	Subodh Kumar Pokharel			
1993	Milan (Meeting)	Shiv Shrestha, Karishma Manandhar, Brazesh Khanal, Melina Manandhar	Laxminath Sharma	Subodh Kumar Pokharel	Sambhujeet Baskota	Subodh Shreedhar
1993	Priyasi (Girlfriend)	Melina Manandhar (debut), Kiran Pratap K.C.	Deepak Rayamajhi		Sambhujeet Baskota	
1993	Sankalpa (Decision)	Bhuwan K.C., Krishna Malla, Sharmila Malla, Kristi Mainali, Shiv Shrestha	Shyam Rai	Om Shiv Shakti Films	Sambhujeet Baskota	
1994	Bhauju (Sister-in-Law)	Rajesh Hamal, Karishma Manandhar	Rajendra Shalabh		Sambhujeet Baskota	Subodh Shreedhar
1994	Deuki [Goddess]	Rajesh Hamal, Mausami Malla	Banni Pradhan			
1994	Deuta (God)	Rajesh Hamal, Srijana Basnet (debut), Shrawan Ghimire	Tulsi Ghimire		Ranjit Gazmer	
1994	Chatyang (Lightning)	Rajesh Hamal, Gauri Malla	Giri Raj Lamichhane		Pratap Subba	
1994	Kasam (The Promise)	Rajesh Hamal, Kristi Mainali, Mausami Malla	Deepak Rayamajhi			
1994	Naata (Relation)	Bhuwan K.C., Gauri Malla, Shree Krishna Shrestha, Ashok Sharma	Biswa Banet			Subodh Shreedhar
1994	Sapana (Dream)	Bhuwan K.C., Shiv Shrestha, Karishma Manandhar, Mausami Malla	Sambhu Pradhan			
1994	Aparadh (Crime)	Rajesh Hamal, Kristi Mainali, Melina Manandhar	Amar Rasilee			
1994	Badal (Cloud)	Bhuwan K.C., Krishna Malla, Sharmila Malla, Bina Basnet				
1994	Chahana (A Desire)	Rajesh Hamal, Sunil Thapa, Karisma Manandhar, Santosh Panta, Saroj Khanal	Sheetal Nepal			Subodh Shreedhar
1994	Cheli (A Girl)	Mausami Malla, Dhiren Shakya	Raju Dhowj Rana	Shradha Arts	Anil Shahi	
1994	Dakshina (Tribute)	Bhuwan K.C., Niruta Singh (debut)	Tulsi Ghimire		Ranjit Gazmer	
1994	Dushman (Enemy)	Kiran Pratap, Saroj Khanal, Mausami Malla, Rupa Rana	Badri Adhikari	Nirmala Rana	Bhupendra Rayamajhi	
1994	Janma Janma (One Life to Another)	Saroj Khanal, Dhiren Shahkya	Sheetal Nepal	Multi Track Movies	Subh Bahadhur	
1994	Jhajhalko (Remembrances)	Shiv Shrestha, Gauri Malla, Kristi Mainali, Shree Krishna Shrestha (debut)	Gagan Birahi	United Films	Sambhujeet Baskota	
1994	Pahilo Prem (First Love)		Chetan Karki			
1994	Sadak (Road)	Rajesh Hamal, Saroj Khanal, Sunny Runiyar	Tirth Thapa		Prakssh Gurung	Subodh Shreedhar
1994	Paribhasa (Definition)	Rajesh Hamal, Saroj Khanal, Karishma Manandhar	Rajendra Shalabh	Madhav Narayan Lingthep		Subodh Shreedhar
1994	Prem Puja (Praising of Love)	Dhiren Shakya	Raju Dhowj Rana	Sunsine Films	Anil Shahi	
1994	Prithvi (World)	Rajesh Hamal, Srijana Basnet, Mausami Malla	Prakash Sayami	Shiva Shakti Films	Shakti Ballav	
1994	Rakchaya (Protection)		Prem Baniya			
1994	Sannani (A Small Girl)	Saroj Khanal, Anita Silwal	Narayan Puri			
1994	Saubhagye (Good Luck)	Dhiren Shakya, Mausami Malla, Rupa Rana	Madhav Sapkota	Sangam Films	Chandra Thapa	
1994	Sauta (2nd Wife)	Bhuwan K.C., Karishma Manandhar, Bina Basnet	Narayn Puri			Subodh Shreedhar
1994	Shanti Deep (Light of Peace)	Puran Joshi, Arjun Jung Shahi, Nabina Shrestha, Mithila Sharma	Royal Nepal Film Corporation	Laxminath Sharma	Nati Kaji, Shiv Shankar	
1994	Mahadevi (Main Goddess)	Bhuwan K.C., Karishma Manandhar	Narayan Puri			Subodh Shreedhar
1994	Swarga (Heaven)	Shiva Shreshtha, Neer Shah, Arjun Shrestha, Gauri Malla	Sambhu Pradhan		Sambhujeet Baskota	
1994	Truck Driver {गाडि चालक}	Shiv Shrestha, Karishma Manandhar, Bijay Lama	Raj Kumar Sharma		Sambhujeet Baskota	
1994	Tuhuro (Orphan)	Bhuwan K.C., Srijana Basnet, Mausami Malla, Dinesh Sharma (actor)			Bhupendra Ray Majhi	
1995	Daju Bhai (Brothers)	Bhuwan K.C., Shree Krishna Shrestha, Mausami Malla	Banni Pradhan	Lady Bird Films	Shubh Bahadur	
1995	Dharma (Religion)		Amar Rasilee			Subodh Shreedhar
1995	Jaali Rumal (The Knitted Handkerchief)	Shree Krishna Shrestha, Melina Manandhar, Sudhamshu Joshi	Anish Koirala			
1995	Janma Bhoomi (Motherland)	Bipana Thapa (debut)	Mohan Niraula			
1995	Jeevan Sangharsha (Struggles of Life)	Rajesh Hamal, Mithila Sharma				Subodh Shreedhar
1995	Jwala (Flame)	Rajesh Hamal	Mukunda Bastakoti		Sila Bahadur Moktan	
1995	Karja (Debt)	Dhiren Shakya, Kristi Mainali, Ganesh Upreti	Kishore Rana			
1995	Maha Maya (Greatest Love)	Shiv Shrestha, Saroj Khanal, Gauri Malla, Mithila Sharma	Prakash Thapa			
1995	Mohani (Fatal Attraction)	Ganesh Upreti, Bina Basnet, Saroj Khanal	Ramesh Budathoki		Sambhujeet Baskota	Subodh Shreedhar
1995	Prem Pinda (Love)	Saroj Khanal, Sani Rauniyar (debut), Melina Manandhar, Neer Shah	Yadav Kharel		Sambhujeet Baskota	
1995	Rajamati [ Ancient Newari girl of Beauty ]	Shree Krishna Shrestha, Maniraj Lawat, Hisila Maharjan	Neer Shah		Nhyoo Bajracharya	
1995	Ragat (Blood)	Saroj Khanal, Bipana Thapa, Bina Basnet, Anita Silwal	Narayan Puri	Kalpana Acharya	Sachin Singh	Karun Thapa
1995	Sarangi [Typical Nepali musical Instrument]	Saroj Khanal, Brazesh Khanal, Karishma Manandhar, Saranga Shrestha, Teeka Pahari	Laxminath Sharma	Dhan Bahadur Pun	Sambhujeet Baskota	
1995	Sarswati [Goddess of Knowledge]	Shiva Shrestha, Sunil Thapa, Gauri Malla	Sambhu Pradhan			
1995	Simana (Border)	Rajesh Hamal, Dhiren Shakya, Melina Manandhar	Prakash Sayami	Rajendra Maharjan	Shakti Ballav	
1996	Aaghat (Trauma)	Kristi Mainali, Bhuwan K.C., Shree Krishna Shrestha	Anish Koirala			
1996	"Aafno Birano" (Native Foreigner)	Rajesh Hamal, Shreekrishna Shrestha, Shrisha Karki				
1996	Avatar (Incarnation)	Rajesh Hamal, Gauri Malla, Jal Shah (debut)	Prakash Sayami	Padhma Pictures P. Ltd.		
1996	Agni Parichya (The Fire Test)	Rajesh Hamal, Bipana Thapa	Surya Bohra	Machha Puchhre Films	Sambhujeet Baskota	
1996	Anartha (Wrong Meaning)		Kundan Khanal	National Vision	Anil Shahi	
1996	Andolan (Strike)	Karishma Manandhar, Dinesh Sharma	Tirtha Thapa		Prakash Gurung	
1996	Balidan (Offering)	Madan Krishna Shrestha, Hari Bansa Acharya	Tulsi Ghimire			
1996	Bandhan (Imprison)	Rajesh Hamal, Karishma Manandhar, Melina Manandhar, Dinesh Sharma	Resh Raj Acharya	Sigdel Films	Subh Bahadur	
1996	Bhariya (Sky Hop)	Rajesh Hamal, Melina Manandhar	Daya Ram Dahal	Chandramukhi Films	Anil Shahi	
1996	Chhori Buhari (Daughter Daughter-in-law)	Rajesh Hamal, Pooja Chand	Laxminath Sharma	Mansarowar Films P. Ltd.		
1996	Chunauti (Challenge)	Saroj Khanal, Shree Krishna Shrestha, Bipana Thapa	Naresh Kumar Poudel	Ranjeet Movies	Sambhujeet Baskota	
1996	Daijo (Dowry)	Bhuwan K.C., Melina Manandhar	Daya Ram Dahal	Shankha Devi Cine Arts	Anil Shahi	
1996	Jaya Baba Pashupati Nath (Hail Father Pashupati Nath)	Saroj Khanal, Sudhamshu Joshi	Satish Kumar	Sayapatri Films	Muralidhar	
1996	Laxmi Puja (Goddess Laxmi worship)	Kristi Mainali, Ganesh Upreti, Shree Krishna Shrestha		Mansarowar Films P. Ltd.		
1996	Karodpati (Millionaire)	Bhuwan K.C., Sushmita K.C.	Kishore Rana		Sambhujeet Baskota	
1996	Nirmaya	Shree Krishna Shrestha, Saranga Shrestha	Narayan Puri			
1996	Nirmohi	Dinesh Sharma, Jal Shah, Saroj Khanal	Nayan Raj Pandey			
1996	Paachuri (Sawl)	Shiv Shrestha, Bhuwan K.C., Kristi Mainali, Nabina Shrestha	Banni Pradhan	Amrita Cine Arts	Yujin Lama	
1996	Prateeksha (Waiting)	Karishma Manandhar	Raj Bikram Shah			
1996	Raanko	Shiv Shrestha, Bhuwan K.C., Gauri Malla, Mithila Sharma, Bijaya Lama, Kristi Mainali	Kishore Rana			
1996	Rahar (Wish)	Niruta Singh	Tulsi Ghimire	Ajambari Films	Ranjit Gazmer	
1996	Sun Chandi (Gold Silver)	Shree Krishna Shrestha, Saranga Shrestha	Sambhu Pradhan	Ishwori Films	Sambhujeet Baskota	
1996	Gothalo (Cowboy)	Krishna Malla, Sarmila Malla, Saroj Khanal, Shree Krishna Shrestha	Ujwal Ghimire	Cine Concern	Sambhujeet Baskota	
1996	Yo Maya Le Launa Satayo (This love irritated me)		Deepak Rayamajhi			
1997	Allare	Rajesh Hamal, Karishma Manandhar, Ashok Sharma, Shrisha Karki	Ashok Sharma		Sambhujeet Baskota	
1997	Bishalu		Dev Kuamr Shrestha			
1997	Chandal	Rajesh Hamal, Karishma Manandhar, Anita Silwal	Arun Kumar Jha			
1997	Chahaari					
1997	Daiba Sanyog	Manju Kumar Shrestha, Sunny Rauniyar				
1997	Dauntari					
1997	Des Pardes	Dhiren Shakya, Karishma Manandhar	Yuva Raj Lama			
1997	Deurali		Yuva Raj Lama			
1997	Guru Chela	Shree Krishna Shrestha, Saranga Shrestha			Sambhujeet Baskota	
1997	Ishwor	Shiva Shrestha, Jal Shah			Arjun Basnet	
1997	Jalan	Dinesh Sharma	Mukunda Bastakoti			
1997	Jameen	Dhiren Shakya, Bipana Thapa			Prakash Sayami	
1997	Jun Tara	Rajesh Hamal, Dhiren Shakya, Neer Shah	Ramesh Budathoki			
1997	Khelauna		Yuva Raj Lama			
1997	Miteri Gaun	Shiv Shrestha, Pooja Chand, Pabitra Subba	Gagan Birahi			
1997	Naaso	Shiv Shrestha, Karishma Manandhar, Saranga Shrestha	Yadav Kharel			
1997	Pocketmaar	Dinesh Sharma, Shree Krishna Shrestha	Raju Dhowj Rana			
1997	Parai Ghar	Jal Shah, Ramesh Upreti	Deepak Rayamajhi			
1997	Rajkumar	Dhiren Shakya, Karishma Manandhar, Pooja Chand				
1997	Bandhan	Dinesh Sharma, Rajesh Hamal, Karishma Manandhar, Melina Manandhar	Resh Raj Acharya			
1997	Seema Rekha	Sanu Baba, Sudhamshu Joshi	Rajani Rana	Kishore Rana		
1997	Shankar	Rajesh Hamal, Jal Shah, Bipana Thapa	Narayan Puri			Karun Thapa
1998	Ansha Banda		Suraj Subba			
1998	Malati	Dinesh Sharma, Shiv Shrestha	Anil Sangraula			
1998	Bahadur		Ashok Shrestha		Tika Bhandari	
1998	Bhanu Bhakta	Dilip Rayamajhi (debut), Anita Silwal (debut)	Yadav Kharel			
1998	Chamatkar					
1998	Chor	Rajesh Hamal, Bipana Thapa	Raj Kumar Sharma			
1998	Devdut (God's Messenger)	Shree Krishna Shrestha, Bipana Thapa, Ramesh Upretti, Yubaraj Lama	Yuva Raj Lama			
1998	Dulaha Raja Dulahi Rani	Bipana Thapa	Yuva Raja Lama			
1998	Filim		Madan Krishna Shrestha, Hari Bansa Acharya			
1998	Gaunle	Rajesh Hamal, Bipana Thapa	Deepak Shrestha	Laxmi Puj Films	Tika Bhandari	
1998	Ghaam Chayan		Kishore Rana			
1998	Jeet	Shree Krishna Shrestha, Bipana Thapa, Ramesh Upreti	Laxminath Sharma		Tika Bhandari	
1998	Mr Ram Krishne	Rajesh Hamal, Karishma Manandhar, Ashok Sharma, Saranga Shrestha	Ashok Sharma		Shambhujeet Baskota	
1998	Nayak		Manju Kumar Shrestha			
1998	Pardesi					
1998	Pardesi Kancha	Rajesh Hamal, Karishma Manandhar		Karishma Films	Tika Bhandari	
1998	Rana Bhoomi		Aakash Adhikari			
1998	Rani Khola	Melina Manandhar, Bipana Thapa				199
1998	Saathi	Rajesh Hamal				
1998	Sagun	Shiv Shrestha, Bipana Thapa				Karun Thapa
1998	Kasto Samjhauta		Deepak Rayamajhi			
1998	Shikhar	Shree Krishna Shrestha, Shyaroon Sherpa	Gagan Birahi			
1998	Sindur Pote		Raju Dhowj Rana			
1998	Suraksha	Dinesh Sharma, Niruta Singh, Sunil Thapa	Armit Sharma			
1998	The Commando		JayBee Rai	Basanti Rai	Sachin Singh	
1998	Thuldai	Shiv Shrestha, Jal Shah, Niruta Singh	Dayaram Dahal	K.B. Pandit	Shambhujeet Baskota	
1999	Afanta	Niruta Singh, Shree Krishna Shrestha	Shiva Regmi			
1999	Apsara	Bipana Thapa, Sanchita Luitel (debut), Ramesh Upreti			Sambhujeet Baskota	
1999	Awara		Bijaya Thapa			
1999	Bhai	Sushil Chhetri (debut)	Deepak Shrestha		Tika Bhandari	
1999	Chalachitra		Biswa Basnet			
1999	Chameli		Ravi Baral			
1999	Nepali Babu	Dinesh Sharma, Bhuwan KC, Sunil Thapa	Yugen Chhopel	Bhuwan KC		
1999	Chandani	Rajesh Hamal, Niruta Singh	Daya Ram Dahal			
1999	Chhori Buhari	Rajesh Hamal, Puja Chand, Nir Shah, Sunil Thapa	Laxmikant Sharma			
1999	Dharam Sankat	Rajesh Hamal	Resh Raj Acharya			
1999	Dharmaputra	Dinesh Sharma, Rajesh Hamal, Niruta Singh	Yuva Raj Lama			
1999	Dodhar	Arjun Shrestha, Jal Shah, Ramesh Upreti, Niruta Singh, Tika Pahari	Narendra Shrestha			
1999	Ek Number Ko Pakhe	Rajesh Hamal, Karishma Manandhar, Jal Shah, Neer Shah, Dinesh DC	Kishore Rana		Sambhujeet Baskota	
1999	Gorkhali	Sree Krishna Shrestha, Jharana Thapa	Gyanendra Deuja			
1999	Hathiyar	Jharna Bajracharya, Karisma Manandhar, Lokendra Karki, Simanta Udas	Prakash Sayami			
1999	Himalaya (Caravan) official entry for the Oscars					
1999	Jange		Daya Ram Dahal			
1999	Kancha	Rajesh Hamal, Karishma Manandhar	Surya Bohra			
1999	Mato Bolcha	Rajesh Hamal, Bipana Thapa, Dinesh Sharma, Melina Manandhar	Resh Raj Acharya	Sayapatri Films		
1999	Maute Dai	Yuva Raj Lama, Ramesh Upreti, Jala Shah	Yuva Raj Lama			
1999	Nagad Narayan	Ramesh Upreti, Rajesh Hamal, Raj Acharya	Resh Raj Acharya			
1999	Nata Ragat Ko	Niruta Singh, Ganesh Upreti, Shree Krishna Shrestha, Jal Shah		Prakash Thapa		Banish Shah
1999	Pareli		Deepak Rayamajhi			
1999	Sukumbasi	Sunildutta Pandey, Rajesh Hamal	Sagar Ghimire			
1999	Timinai Basyau Mero Manma	Dinesh Sharma, Jal Shah, Sunil Thapa	Banni Pradhan			

== 2000s ==
Year	Film	Artists	Director	Producer	Music composer	Editor/Vfx Artist
2000	Aago	Sushil Chhetri, Bipana Thapa, Niruta Singh	Narayan Puri		Sachin Singh	Subodh Shreedhar
2000	Basanti	Rajesh Hamal, Karishma Manandhar, Gauri Malla	Neer Shah			
2000	Dhuk Dhuki	Rajesh Hamal, Karishma Manandhar				
2000	Jindagani	Rajesh Hamal, Karishma Manandhar	Ujwal Ghimire	Ujwal Ghimire	Sambhujeet Baskota	
2000	Mukundo	Gauri Malla, Mithila Sharma				
2000	Mann Mero Mandaina	Dinesh Sharma, Bipana Thapa	Desh Bhakta Khanal	Chiranjiwi Baasnet		
2000	Tan Ta Sarai Bigris Ni Badri	Bhuwan K.C., Sushmita K. C., Bipana Thapa, Hari Bansha Acharya			Sambhujeet Baskota	
2000	Upkaar	Rajesh Hamal, Karishma Manandhar, Shree Krishna Shrestha, Niruta Singh, Mithila Sharma Sajjal Pant (Child artist)	Kishore Rana	Om Productions	Sambhujeet Baskota	
2000	Shahar	Dinesh Sharma, Puja Chand	Suman Sarkar			
2000	Anjanai maa Maya Basla hai	Dinesh Sharma, Dilip Raymajhi	Chandra Prakash	Gopal Karmacharya		
2001	Aafno Manchhe	Bipana Thapa, Dilip Rayamajhi, Shree Krishna Shrestha, Niruta Singh Rejina Uprety	Shiva Regmi			
2001	Aashirbad	Dinesh Sharma, Ram Krishna Dhakal, Rajesh Hamal, Jal Shah, Sanchita Luitel	Sambhu Pradhan	Gopal Karmacharya		
2001	Afno Ghar Afno Manche		Narayan Puri			Karun Thapa
2001	Ladai	Dinesh Sharma, Sushil Chhetri	Badri Adhikari			Banish Shah
2001	Army (2001 film)	Dinesh Sharma, Lokendra Karki, Jal Shah	Shovit Basnet			Banish Shah
2001	Badal Paree	Bhuwan K.C., Jal Shah, Neer Shah	Ugyen Chopel		Sambhujeet Baskota	
2001	Beimani	Shiva Shrestha, Shrisha Karki, Shree Krishna Shrestha, Bipana Thapa	Bijay Chalise			
2001	Bihani					Karun Thapa
2001	Buhari	Shree krishna Shrestha, Sunil Thapa, Neer Shah				Banish Shah
2001	Daag	Dinesh Sharma, Dhiren Shakya, Jal Shah, Rajani Rana		Akash Adhikari		
2001	Daiva Sanjog		Manju Kumar Shrestha			
2001	Darpan Chaya	Niruta Singh, Uttam Pradhan, Tulsi Ghimire, Dilip Rayamajhi	Tulsi Ghimire	Ranjit Gazmer		
2001	Gaajal	Ramesh Uprety, Bipana Thapa, Sushil Chhetri	K P Pathak			Karun Thapa
2001	Gaunthali		Dr.Bhola Rijal			
2001	Haudey	Dinesh Sharma, Ishwor Shrestha	Suraj Subba			
2001	Jeevan Saathi		Deepak Shrestha			
2001	Kaidi	Dhiren Shakya, Kshitiza Shakya, Shrisha Karki	Manoj Khadka			Banish Shah
2001	Ke Bho Lau Na Ni	Dinesh Sharma, Anupama Koirala, Sushil Chhetri, Shiva Shrestha	Anish Koirala			
2001	Manai Ta Ho		Bipana Thapa, Nawal Khadka, Ramesh Upreti	Uday Subba		Banish Shah
2001	Maya Baiguni	Rajesh Hamal, Dhiren Shakya, Simanta Udash, Bina Basnet, Shrisha Karki	Subhash Gajurel			
2001	Maya Ko Saino		Resh Raj Aacharya			
2001	Natedar	Shiva Shrestha, Puja Chand, Dilip Raimajhi	Mukunda Bastakoti		Tika Bhandari	
2001	Nepal Pyaro Chha	Dinesh Sharma, Rajesh Hamal, Jal Shah, Ramesh Upreti	Sambhu Pradhan		Subash Gautam	
2001	Numafung	Alok Nembang	Nabin Subba			
2001	Pirati Aafai Hudon Rahechha		Raju Dhowj Rana			
2001	Siudo Ko Sindoor	Rajesh Hamal, Niruta Singh, Jharana Bajracharya, Neer Shah, Ratan Subedi, Basundhara Bhushal	Manju Kumar Shrestha			Karun Thapa
2001	SuperStar	Bhuwan K.C., Sushmita K. C.	Anish Koirala			Banish Shah
2001	Timrai Lagi		Uday Subba			Banish Shah
2001	Kasto Saino	Rajesh Hamal	Madan Ghimire			Karun Thapa
2001	Yo Maya Ko Sagar	Jal Shah, Ramesh Upreti	Ashok Sharma			
2002	Susmita Ko Life	Niruta Singh, Uttam Pradhan	Deepak Shrestha			
2002	Maya Baiguni	Dhiraj Shrestha, Bina Budhathoki, Shrisha Karki	Subash Gajurel	Kanchi Hamal	Madan Dipbim	
2002	Anjuli					
2002	Baacha Bandhan	Dhiren Shakya, Shrisha Karki, Shanti Maskey, Basundhara Bhusal, Rajaram Paudel				
2002	Babu Saheb	Bhuwan K.C., Karishma Manandhar, Sushmita K.C.	Ramesh Budathoki			
2002	Bakshish				Tika Bhandari	
2002	Bhagya Le Jurayo	Rajesh Hamal, Rejina Uprety	Resh Raj Acharya			
2002	Bhai Tika		Laxmi Nath Sharma			Karun Thapa
2002	Bir Ganeshman	Manoj RC	Sahajman Shrestha, Bijayratna Tuladhar	Nabindra Raj Joshi		
2002	Dhan Sampati	Dilip Rayamajhi, Rejina Uprety				
2002	Hateri	Rajesh Hamal, Rejina Uprety, Puja Chand				
2002	Khandan	Rajesh Hamal, Niruta Singh, Rejina Uprety, Sushil Chhetri	Yuva Raj Lama			
2002	Maan	Dinesh Sharma, Rejina Uprety, Uttam Pradhan, Jay Kishan Basnet	Sovit Basnet			Banish Shah
2002	Malai Maaf Garidau		Bijay Thapa			Karun Thapa
2002	Malati	Dinesh Sharma, Shiva Shrestha, Jal Shah, Shrisha Karki	Anil Sangraula			Karun Thapa
2002	Mama Bhanja					
2002	Mamaghar	Shiv Shrestha, Gauri Malla, Dilip Rayamajhi, Melina Manandhar				Karun Thapa
2002	Man Mandir					Banish Shah
2002	Maya Namara					
2002	Melong					
2002	Mitini	Bipana Thapa, Dilip Rayamajhi	Anish Koirala			
2002	Mohani Lagla Hai	Bishnu Rijal, Shrisha Karki, Jyoti Sharma, Lav Sharma, Laxmi Giri, Rabi Khadka, Shivahari Paudel, Nabin Shrestha, Sumitra Paudel, Khusbu Karkim Rajendra Thapa	Kundan Khanal	Keshav Prasad Ghimire, Krishna Prasad Pokhrel & Nawaraj Pokhrel	Shambhujeet Baskota	Karun Thapa
2002	Muskan	Bipana Thapa, Sushil Chhetri, Dilip Rayamajhi Rejina Uprety	Yuvaraj Lama			Banish Shah
2002	Pheri Timro Yaad Aayo		Ramesh Budathoki			
2002	Pijanda	Nikhil Upreti (debut), Niruta Singh		Desh Bhakta Khanal	Tika Bhandari	
2002	Pooja		Deepak Rayamajhi			
2002	Rickshaw Puller, The					
2002	Sahid Gate		Raj Kumar Sharma			Banish Shah
2002	Santan Ko Maya	Dinesh Sharma, Rajesh Hamal, Sarita Lamichhane, Puja Chand	Kishore Rana		Tika Bhandari	
2002	Sanyas	Rajesh Hamal, Gauri Malla, Jal Shah, Rejina Uprety	Shambhu Pradhan			
2002	Shadhyantra		Suneel Pandey			
2002	Yestai Rahecha Jindagi		Biswa Basnet			
2002	Andhi Tufan	Dinesh Sharma, Richa Ghimire				
2002	Santan Thari Thari Ka	Dinesh Sharma, Dilip Ray Majhi				Banish Shah
2002	Ye Mero Hajur	Shree Krishna Shrestha, Jharna Thapa	Shiva Regmi			
2003	Je Bho Ramrai Bho	Hari Bansha Acharya, Rajesh Hamal, Jal Shah, Madan Krishna Shrestha	Hari Bansha Acharya	Kiran K. C.	Sambhujeet Baskota	
2003	Jetho Kancha	Shiv Shrestha Rajesh Hamal, Jal Shah	Dayaram Dahal			
2003	Muna Madan	Deepak Tripathi, Usha Paudel	Gyanendra Bahadur Deuja		Laxman Bidari	
2003	Bhagya	Dinesh Sharma, Nikhil Upreti	Prakash Bhattarai	Sunil Datta Pandey		Banish Shah
2003	Shukha Dukha	Madan Krishna Shrestha, Mithila Sharma, Shree Krishna Shrestha, Jharana Thapa	Shiva Regmi	Cine Kala Movies	Sambhujeet Baskota	
2003	Upahar	Niruta Singh, Uttam Pradhan, Sushil Chhetri	Shiva Regmi	Super Star Enterprises	Laxman Shesh	Banish Shah
2003	Sangram	Dinesh Sharma, Melina Manandhar	Mahendra Budhathoki	Raj Kumar Rai		
2003	Dhadkan	Dinesh Sharma, Nikhil Upreti, Rekha Thapa	Naresh Poudyal	Naresh Poudyal		Banish Shah
2004	Haami Teen Bhai	Rajesh Hamal, Shree Krishna Shrestha, Nikhil Upreti, Jharana Thapa, Rekha Thapa	Shiva Regmi		Shambhujeet Baskota	Banish Shah
2004	Lakshya	Manoj RC, Uttam Pradhan, Sushmita Karki, Noyo Singh	Manoj Pandit	Harendra Limbu		Karun Thapa
2004	Krishna Arjun	Dinesh Sharma, Rajesh Hamal	Deepak Shrestha	Chiranjiwi Basnet		
2004	Muglan	Jharna Thapa, Dilip Rayamajhi, Bipana Thapa		Kishore Khanal	Suresh Adhikari	
2004	Pareni Maya Jalaima	Dilip Rayamajhi, Uttam Pradhan, Jharana Bajracharya, Mitthila Sharma, Sunil Thapa	Prithvi Rana and Ram Saran Ghimire	Prithvi Rana	Sachin Singh	
2004	Bhagya Bidhata	Dinesh Sharma, Rajesh Hamal, Rupa Rana	Dayaram Dahal	Chiranjiwi Basnet		
2004	Jwalamukhi	Mahendra Budhathoki				
2005	Basain	Mukunda Bastakoti, Ranju Lamichhane, Uttam Pradhan, Mithila Sharma, Ganesh Upreti	Subash Gajurel	Lil Bahadur Chhetri	Shakti Ballav	Banish Shah
2005	Abhimanyu	Dinesh Sharma, Nikhil Upreti	Naresh Poudyal	Mounta Shrestha		Banish Shah
2006	Alpaviram					Karun Thapa
2006	Duniya	Dinesh Sharma, Nikhil Upreti	Shiva Regmi			Banish Shah
2006	Karma					
2006	Krodh	Nikhil Upreti, Akash Adhikari, Jal Shah, Rekha Thapa, Usha Paudel, Dinesh Sharma		Akash Adhikari	Laxmzn Shah, Suresh Adhikari	Banish Shah
2006	Maanis	Bhuwan K.C, Nikhil Uprety, Bipana Thapa, Rejina Uprety	Shiva Regmi			
2006	Matina La Ana He Du	Suraj Shakya, Ashishma Nakarmi	Subhash Ram Prajapati			
2006	Parai ko ghar	Suraj Shakya, Ashishma Nakarmi	Subhash Ram Prajapati		Goruduba	
2007	Ram Balram	Shree Krishna Shrestha				Banish Shah
2007	Antya	Dinesh Sharma, Usha Poudel	Basudev Pokharel	Dinesh Sharma		
2007	Yuddha					
2007	Paapi Manchhe	Dinesh Sharma, Nikhil Upreti	Deepak Shrestha	Raj Kumar Raai		Banish Shah
2007	Ma Maya Garchhu	Dinesh Sharma, Rajesh Hamal, Ayush Rijal	Raj Shakya			
2008	Himmat	Dinesh Sharma, Rekha Thapa				
2008	Sandesh	Rejina Uprety, Biraj Bhatta, Sushil Chhetri, Rekha Thapa, Sovita Simkhada	Pramod Bhandari	Ram B. Nepali	Mahesh Khadka	
2008	Aafno Manche Aafnai Hunchha (Own are own)	Biraj Bhatta, Rekha tThapa, Arunima, Suman Singh				
2008	Bastabikta (Reality)					
2008	Batuli	Rajesh Hamal, Rekha Thapa, Biraj Bhatt				Banish Shah
2008	The Nirmala	Dinesh Sharma Pujana Pradhan	Raju Adhikari (film director)			Sudeep Acharya
2008	Daag (Scar)					
2008	Iku - The Jungle Man	Suleman Shankar, Usha Rajak				
2008	Kagbeni	Nima Rumba, Saugat Malla, Deeya Maskey	Bhusan Dahal	Bhaskar Dhungana, Nakim Uddin, Rajesh Siddhi		
2008	Pahilo Pahilo Maya (First First Love)	Raj Ballav, Yuna Upreti				
2008	Pratighat	Dinesh Sharma, Prerana Sharma, Rakshanda Sharma	Basudev Pokharel	Dinesh Sharma		
2008	Sano Sansar (Small World)	Mahesh Shakya, Jivan Luitel (debut), Namrata Shrestha (debut)	Alok Nembang	Quest Entertainment		
2008	Karnabir	Rajesh Hamal, Rejina Uprety, Rekha Thapa, Jaikishan Basnet,	Shovit Basnet	Salon Films P. ltd.		Banish Shah
2008	Kismat	Biraj bhatta, Rekha Thapa, Aryan Sigdel (Debutant), Rajaram Paudel	Ujwal Ghimire	Rekha Films P. ltd.		
2008	Ma Timi Bina Marihalchhu (I will die without you)	Bhuwan K.C., Jharana Thapa, Sushmita K.C.	Dayaram Dahal	Kajal Films	Sambhujeet Baskota	Banish Shah
2008	Kaslai diu yo Jowan (Whom to give this body)	Dilip Rayamajhi, Melina Manandhar, Jharna Thapa, Nikhil Upreti				
2008	Mission Paisa (Misson Money)	Nikhil Upreti, Amir Gautam, Nisha Adhikari	Simos Sunwar	Rajeeb Shrestha, Dipika Thapa Sunuwar		
2008	Salam chha Mayalai (Salute to Love)					
2008	Takkar Dui Mutu Ko (Challenge of two heart)					
2009	Arjun Dev	Biraj Bhatta, Rejina Uprety, Garima Pant	Shiva Regmi	Jay Prakash Eijal		Banish Shah
2009	Bish (Poison)	Rajesh Hamal, Rejina Uprety, Richa Ghimire, Sanchita Luitel, Nikhil Uprety		Shankar Ghimire		
2009	RAAJ	Biraj bhatta, Rejina Uprety, Shiva Shrestha, Ramit Dhungana	Bijaya Gopal Dali	Gajendra Ranjit		
2009	Chodi Gaye Paap Lagla (If you leave than you may get sin)	Raj Ballav Koirala, Biraj Bhatta, Richa Ghimire, Sanchita Luitel	Ujwal Ghimire			
2009	Dhum	Biraj Bhatta, Ramit Dhungana, Rejina Uprety, Arjun Karki,	Shobhit Basnet			Banish Shah
2009	Deewanapan (Craziness)	Dinesh Sharma, Arunima Lamsal, Raj Ballav Koirala	Krishna Chapagain			
2009	Gorkha Rachhayak (Gorkha Saviour)		Giri Raj Lamichhane			Banish Shah
2009	Itihaas (History)	Biraj Bhatta, Rejina Uprety, Rekha Thapa				
2009	Izzatdar (Respectful)	Dinesh Sharma, Rajesh Hamal, Biraj Bhatta, Arjun Karki	Krishna Chapagain			
2009	Jay Shiva Shankar (Hail Shiv Shankhar)	Rajesh Hamal, Nikhil Upreti, Rejina Uprety, Rajesh Dhungana, Biraj Bhatt	Rajendra Upreti			Banish Shah
2009	Jindagi (Life)					
2009	Jeewan Mrityu (Life Death)	Nikhil Upreti, Ramit Dhungana, Garima Pant	Ramesh Budhathoki	Uddhav Poudel		
2009	Jungbaaz (Warrior)	Rajesh Hamal, Gauri Malla, Rushma Rai, Sunil Thapa, Ashok Sharma, Yuvaraj Lama				Banish Shah
2009	Kohi Mero	Dinesh Sharma, Jharana Bajracharya	Alok Nengbang			
2009	Kahan Bhetiyela (Where may I meet?)	Shree Krishna Shrestha, Niruta Singh	Shiva Regmi	Shree Krishna Shrestha	Sambhujeet Baskota	
2009	Kahan Chau Kahan (Where are You Where)	Jharana Thapa, Biraj Bhatta, Govind Shahi, Ganesh Upreti	Dayaram Dahal			Banish Shah
2009	Dhunge Youg (STONE ERA)	Dil Krishna Shrestha, Sabina	Madhab Raj Kharel			
2009	Kusume Rumal 2 (Scarlet Handkerchief 2)	Niraj Baral, Rejina Upreti Usha Rajak, Rubi Bhattarai, Tripti Nadakar	Nirak Poudel	Uddhav Poudel	Suryajeet Baskota	
2009	Mahan (Great)	Dinesh Sharma, Biraj Bhatta, Jharana Thapa, Jaykishan Basnet	Krishna Chapagain	Dinesh Sharma		
2009	Mero Euta Saathi Cha (I Have one friend)	Aryan Sigdel, Namrata Shrestha	Sudarshan Thapa	Prabhu SJB Rana	Sugam Pokharel, Bipin Acharya	
2009	Mission Love In Sikkim	Bikrant Basnet, Rushma Rai	Sovit Basnet	Channel Ace Productions	Sanjay Shrestha	Banish Shah
2009	Mr Mangale	Biren Shrestha, Rekha Thapa		Biren Shrestha		
2009	Naina Resham (Silk of eye)	Biraj Bhatt, Nisha Adhikari				
2009	Naseeb Afno (Own Luck)		Bikas Acharya			
2009	Nepali Veer (Strong Nepali)					Banish Shah
2009	Nishana (Target)	Rajesh Hamal, Nikhil Upreti, Rejina Uprety				
2009	Paapi Manche 2 (Sinner 2)	Nikhil Upreti, Sunil Thapa, Pujana Pradhan	Deepak Shrestha	Raj Kumar Rai		
2009	Rachhayak (Saviour)					Banish Shah
2009	Rajya (Kingdom)					Banish Shah
2009	Sahara (Pillar)					
2009	Sandesh (Message)	Rejina Uprety, Biraj Bhatta, Sushil Chhetri, Rekha Thapa, Sovita Simkhada				
2009	Silsila (System)	Rekha Thapa, Biraj, Bhatta, Soniya Kc, Raj				Banish Shah
2009	The Third Generation					
2009	Kanoon (Law)	Dinesh Sharma, Rajesh Hamal				
2009	Trinetra (Third-Eye)	Nikhil Upreti, Shweta Tiwari				Banish Shah
2009	Mission paisa	Nikhil Upreti, Nisha Adhikari, Sunil Thapa				

== 2010s ==
=== 2010 ===
Release date	Film	Cast	Director	Producer	Music composer	Editor/Vfx Artist
2010	Nai Nabhannu La	Jeevan Luintel, Richa Singh Thakuri	Bikash Acharya	Ramesh Jung Rayemajhi	Mahesh Khadka	
2010	Basma Chaina Yo Mann	Biraj Bhatta, Karishma Manandhar, Raj Ballav Koirala, Nandita KC	Ramraja Dahal	Rimesh Adhikari	Vinod Khumbu	
2010	Bato Muni Ko Phool	Yash Kumar, Rekha Thapa, Babu Bogati, Nandita KC	Suroj Subba	Yash Kumar	Yash Kumar	
2010	Chino (New)	Shiva Shrestha, Biraj Bhatta, Rejina Upreti				
2010	Dasdhunga	Anup Baral, Kiran Kunwar, Dayahang Rai, Sanchita Luitel, Saugat Malla	Manoj Pandit	Yama Devi Bista		
2010	Desh Dekhi Bidesh	Nikhil Upreti, Dilip Rayamajhi, Richa Ghimire, Prerana Sharma, Daman Rupakheti	Narendra Thapa	Ramita Thapa	Sambhujeet Baskota	Banish Shah
2010	First Love	Aryan Sigdel, Karma, Nisha Adhikari, Vinay Shrestha, Reecha Sharma	Simosh Sunuwar	Princess Movies	Surendra Man Singh, Satya—Swaroop	
2010	Gorkha Paltan	Prashant Tamang, Ranjita Gurung, Sunil Thapa	Narayan Rayamajhi	Rajesh Bansal	BB Anuragi, Mahendra Budathoki	Sudeep Acharya(VFX)/Banish Shah(Editor)
2010	Hansi Deu Ek Phera	Madan Krishna Shrestha, Hari Bansha Acharya, Raj Ballav Koirala, Shweta Khadka, Sushil Chhetri	Shiva Regmi	Tejaswi Films	Suresh Adhikari	Banish Shah
2010	Hifajat	Aryan Sigdel, Rekha Thapa, Aayush Rijal (debut)	Gyanendra Deuja	Dijendra Shakya	Mahesh Khadka	
2010	The Flash Back: Farkera Herda	Aryan Sigdel, Nikhil Upreti, Yuna Upreti, Neeta Pokharel	Dayaram Dahal	Uddhab Poudel	Suresh Adhikari	Anil Gautam, Badri Lamichhane
2010	The Yug Dekhi Yug Samma (The Century to Century)	Rajesh Hamal, Nandit KC	Deependra Khanal	Editor		
2010	Kasle Choryo Mero Mann	Sangay Khampa				

=== 2011 ===
Release date	Film	Cast	Director	Producer	Music composer	Note	Editor/Vfx Artist
2011	Annadata	Ramit Dhungana, Dinesh Sharma, Rohan Dhakal, Shibu Singh, Nishan Shahi Dhakal	Niraj Ghimire	Rohan Dhakal			
2011	Dharmaa	Rajesh Hamal, Manisha Koirala, Rejina Uprety, Nikhil Uprety	Dipendra Khanal	Durga Pokhrel	Hari Lamsal		
2011	Khushi	Rekha Thapa, Suman Singh, Aayush Rijal, Ganesh Upreti	Gyanendra Deuja	Gopi Krishan Movies	Alok Shree		
2011	Sahara	Biraj Bhatta, Dilip Rayamajhi, Rekha Thapa, Ramit Dhungana	Pradeep Bhardwoj	Sangam Films	Mahesh Khadka		
2011	Batch No 16	Suman Singh, Rubi Bhattarai, Sushma Karki, Anup Baral	Abispan	Govinda			
2011	Masan	Raj Ballav Koirala, Keki Adhikari	N Shah	Neer Shah, Rimal Films			Banish Shah
2011	Farki Aau	Rajesh Hamal, Niruta Singh					
2011	Parkhi Rakha Hai	Dil Shrestha, Sanchita Luintel, Melina Manandhar, Mukesh Dhakal	Dil Shrestha	Diya Films	Suresh Adhikari		Banish Shah
2011	Malai Man Paryo	Niruta Singh, Raj Ballav Koirala, Jiwan Luitel, Arunima Lamsal	Bhadra Bhujel	Ramesh Jung Rayamajhi	Sambhujeet Baskota		Banish Shah
2011	Devyani	Nikhil Upreti, Dilip Rayamajhi, Bimala KC	Bijay Basnet	Bijay Basnet	Laxman Shesh		Banish Shah
2011	Hamro Maya Juni Juni Lai	Shree Krishna Shrestha, Rekha Thapa, Mukesh Dhakal, Nita Dhungana	Rishi Lamichane	Gopal Pandey	Mahesh Khadka		
2011	Jaba Jaba Maya Bascha	Jiwan Luitel, Rekha Thapa, Mithila Sharma, Shrijana Basnet	Bijay Thapa	Maniram Basnet	Sachin Singh		
2011	Ma Chu Ni Timro	Rose Rana		Rose Rana			
2011	KalaPani	Jharana Thapa, Sanchita Luintel, Nikhil Upreti, Dilip Rayamajhi	Uddhad Abhidit	Uddhad Abhidit	Suresh Adhikari		
2011	Andaaz	Jeevan Luitel, Rekha Thapa, Sabin Shrestha	Ujwal Ghimire	Ujwal Ghimire/Ashok Sharma/Chhabi Ojha	Basanta Sapkota	This is a highest-grossing film of 2011	
2011	Acharay						
2011	Maryo Ni Mayale Maryo						
2011	Mero Pyaro Maitighar	Dinesh Sharma, Dilip Ray Majhi	Uday Subba				
2011	Shreeman						
2011	Dulahi						
2011	Timi Jaha Bhayapani						
2011	Baghchal	Rejina Uprety, Santosh Giri, Naresh Bhattarai					
2011	Kina Mayama						
2011	Aangalo Yo Mayako						

=== 2012 ===
Release date	Film	Cast	Director	Producer	Music composer	Editor/Vfx Artist
2012	Namaste					
2012	Brake Fail	Rajesh Hamal, Bimlesh Adhikari, Neeraj Baral, Richa Ghimire	Shankar Ghimire	Richa Ghimire		
2012	Loot	Dayahang Rai, Saugat Malla, Karma Shakya, Srijana Subba	Nischal Basnet	Madhav Wagle, Narendra Maharjan	Roshan Thapa and Kiran Tuladhar	
2012	Yoddha	Dinesh Sharma, Rajesh Hamal	Uday Subba			
2012	Apabad	Nisha Adhikari, Raj Ballav Koirala	Subash Koirala	Sushan Prajapati	Ujwal Meghi Gurung	

=== 2013 ===
Release date	Film	Cast	Director	Producer	Music composer	Editor/Vfx Artist
April 2013	Saanghuro	Shushank Mainali, Deeya Maskey, Aruna Karki, Dayahang Rai, Buddhi Tamang	Joes Pandey	Sameer Mainali; Mountain River Films		
2013	Bardan	Rajesh Hamal, Karishma Manandhar, Rejina Uprety		Rejina Upreti		
2013	C-Mala (The Necklace)	Manoj RC, Dipti Gurung, Nirvik Rai, Roshani Karki, Rajesh Payal Rai	Rudra Bahadur Gurung	Rudra Bahadur Gurung	Kankist Rai	
2013	Cha Ekan Cha	Kedar Ghimire, Sitaram Kattel	Dinesh DC	Deepak Raj Giri		
2013	Manjari	Gaurav Pahari, Sujata Koirala, Tika Pahari, Bishnu Rimal	Ganesh Dev Panday	Naresh Pandey, Mahesh Chalise	Kali Prashad Baskota	
2013	Hostel	Anmol K.C., Prakreeti Shrestha, Gaurav Pahadia, Salon Basnet, Rista Basnet	Hemaraj BC	Sunil Rawal	The Shadows	
2013	Loafer	Aryan Sigdel, Dayahang Rai, Rajani KC, Kamal Mani Nepal	Aditya Bikram Lamsal	Chhabi Raj Ojha	Tara Prakash Limbu	

=== 2014 ===
Release date	Film	Cast	Director	Producer	Music composer	Editor/Vfx Artist	Notes
March 2014	Ritu	Raj Ballav Koirala, Malina Joshi, Reema Bishwokarma etc.	Manoj Adhikari	Apil Bista	Hemanta Rana, Tsujil Karamacharya		
2014	Kabaddi	Dayahang Rai, Rishma Gurung, Nischal Basnet	Ram Babu Gurung				
2014	Humjayaga	Babu Bogati, Wilson Bikram Rai Manoj RC, Parbati Rai	Surendra Pun	Bhoj Bahadur Gurung			
2014	Madhumas	Aryan Sigdel, Manoj RC, Pooja Sharma, Shivangini Rana	Sudarshan Thapa	Sudarshan Thapa, Baburam Dahal, Ramesh Thapa	Suresh Adhikari		
2014	Mukhauta	Arpan Thapa	Rabin Shrestha	Jeevan Thapa			
2014	Nai Nabhannu La 2	Anubhav Regmi Sugyani Bhattarai	Bikash Acharya	Dinesh Pokhrel	Basanta Sapkota, Shuresh Gaire		
2014	Mutu-The Heart Belongs To You	Bimlesh Adhikari, Keki Adhikari, Mukesh Acharya	Everest Surya Bohora	Everest Surya Bohara			
2014	Kohinoor	Shree Krishna Shrestha, Sweta Khadka				Banish Shah	
2014	Talakjung vs Tulke	Khagendra Lamichhane, Reecha Sharma, Shushank Mainali, Rabindra Singh Baniya	Nischal Basnet	Rabindra Singh Baniya			Foreign Language Academy Award nominee Nepal
November 14	Jerryy	Anmol K.C., Anna Sharma, Abhisek Man Sherchan, Amalya Sharma	Hemraj BC	Manoj sherchan	Naren limbu		
December 12	Love You Baba	Gajit Bista, Sangam Bista	Saugat Bista	Samjhana Pokharel		Pritam Pandey	

=== 2015 ===
Release date	Film	Cast	Director	Producer	Music composer	Editor/Vfx Artist	Notes
2015	Zhigrana	Hanna G, Nikun Shrestha, Menuka Pradhan, Jyoti Karki, Shanti Giri, Arun Regmi, Deewakar Piya, Bina Pandey					
2014	Jwala	Rejina Uprety, Biraj Bhatta, Mukesh					
2014	Ikshya	Dahayang Rai	Giri Raj Lamichhane				
2015	Birano Maya	Shreevev /Namrata Sapkota	Madhab Raj Kharel				Rs 7 million gross in two days; screening was affected by the Nepal earthquake
2015	Danav	Dinesh Sharma, Mahima Silwal, Teja Ayer	Dinesh Sharma	Dinesh Sharma			
2015	Hostel Returns	Sushil Shrestha, Sashi Shrestha, Nazir Hussain, Swastima Khadka, Sushil Sitaula		Sunil Rawal	Swoopnil Sharma		Total Rs 20 million gross
2015	Bhairav	Nikhil Upreti, Anu Shah, Nagendra Rijal, Rekha Thapa (guest role)	Nikhil Upreti	Ratan Daruwala		Banish Shah	
2015	Luv Sab	Samyam Puri, Karishma Shrestha, Salon Basnet	Dev Kumar Mishra	Sushil Pokharel	Tsujil Karmacharya		This is a love triangle movie. Its box office performance was average.
2015	Wada No. 6	Deepak Raj Giri, Sitaram Kattel, Priyanka Karki, Jitu Nepal, Daya hang rai, Kedar Ghimire, Shivahari Poudel Deepa Shree Niraula	Ujwal Ghimire	Deepak Raj Giri			This is a blockbuster hit comedy Nepali movie of 2015. Its two-day collection was nearly more than Rs 4 million.
2015	Chankhe Shankhe Pankhe	Sudarshan Thapa, Prem Puri, Puja Sharma, Rabindra Jha Nandita KC, Pramod Agrahari	Sudarshan Thapa	Santosh Sen			Its five-day gross collection was 1 crore.
2015	Aarop		Amar Oli	Amar oli			
2015	Paradeshi	Prashant Tamang, Rajani KC, Naren Khadka	Narayan Rayamajhi	Rajesh Bansal and Narayan Rayamajhi		Banish shah	The three-week gross collection of Paradeshi was nearly Rs 20 million. This is a considered to be one of the super-hit movies in 2015. This movie talks about Nepalese going to abroad for earning money.
2015	Kabaddi Kabaddi	Dayahang Rai, Saugat Malla, Risma Gurung	Ram Babu Gurung	Raunak Bikram Kandel and Sunil Chanda Rauniyar			Kabaddi Kabaddi is second highest grosser of 2015 in Nepali film industry. It collected more than NRs 5 crore in the box office.
2015	Romance		L N Gautam	L N Gautam			
2015	Jau Hida Pokhara	Rekha Thapa and Jivan Luitel	Shovit Basnet	Ram Gautam		Satyam Rana	Because of its clash with Kabaddi Nepali Movie, its box office collection was poor.

=== 2016 ===
Production Date	Film	Cast	Director	Producer	Music	Story, Screen Play & Dialogue	Post Production	Editor	Note	September 2016	Gaatho	Najir Hussain, Namrata Shrestha, Abhay Baral	Suraj Bhusal	Tilak Bahadur Chhetri, Suraj Bhusal; Butwall Entertainment
2016 October 24	Bonodal (Change) Santali	Hasda Bayar ( Kabiraj Hasda ), Kabita Baskey, Mohan Tudu, Rajan Baskey	Kiran Khatiwada	Kiran Khatiwada	Jona Kisku	Kiran Khatiwada, Akash Kaduwal	Inspire Media Production House Pvt.Ltd	Kiran Khatiwada	First Indigenous Santali Film Nepal, till now film has not been released busy on special show and film festival. After completing this the film will be released.					
2016 Sept. 21	21 Barsha	Junim and Sabina	Janak Khadka	Sunil Manandhar		Interesting	All Cast Crew is Total 21 person. Led Actor, Actress, Director, Writer, Cameraman, Musician, Singer And all 21 years old.							

=== 2017 ===
Release date	Film	Cast	Director	Producer	Music composer	Editor/Vfx Artist	Notes
2017 Dec 1	Fikka	Ajay Sunar, Sharu Nepal,	Janak Khadka	Suchitra Shrestha, [,	Chetan Sapkota and Mak10 Kalu	Ananta Ghimire, Subodh Thapa	

=== 2018 ===
Release date	Film	Cast	Director	Producer	Music composer	Editor/Vfx Artist	Notes
2018	Sunkesari	Reecha Sharma, Sunny Dhakal, Lauren Lofberg, Rabindra Jha	Arpan Thapa	Bhim Neupane, Reecha Sharma, Sharmila Sapkota	Kali Prasad Baskota and Bijaya Adhikari	Ian Scott Clement	
2018	Durgamandu	Saniya, Madhab	Madhab Raj Kharel				
31 August 2018	Meri Mamu	Ayub Sen, Kusum Gurung, Saruk Tamrakar, Aaslesha Thakuri	Yam Thapa	Santosh Sen	Kalyan Singh	Banish Shah, Bhupendra Adhikari	
14 Dec 2018	Kathaa '72	Akash Magar, Bhuisal Lama, Supriya Rana	Prabin Syangbo				
7 Dec 2018	Prasad	Bipin Karki, Namrata Shrestha, Nischal Basnet	Dinesh Raut	Shuvash Thapa	Subash Bhusal	Lokesh Bajracharya	
8 June 2018	Matti Mala	Buddhi Tamang, Rajani Gurung, Priyanka Karki	Teke Paurakhi Rai	Prithbi Rai	Suman Rai	Anil Kumar Maharjan	

=== 2019 ===
Release date	Film	Cast	Director	Producer	Music composer	Editor/Vfx Artist
May 24, 2019	Jhatkka	Surbir Pandit, Rakshya Guragai	Wronit Bee Mizaar	Shyam Shrestha Shekhar Bishunkhe	Purushotam Neupane	Happy Nepal
Sep 13 2019	Password	Anoop Bikram Shahi, Bikram Joshi, Buddhi Tamang, Rabindra Jha	Samrat Basnet	Amit Basnet, Hiral Joshi, Ajit Kumar Thapa	Arjun Pokharel	Arjun G.C.
December 6, 2019	Maya Pirim	Salon Basnet, Anjali Adhikari, Koshish Chhetri	Tek Paurakhi Rai	Pravin Thapa, Sabin Adhikari	Koshish Chhetri	

== 2020s ==
=== 2020 ===
Release date	Film	Cast	Director	Producer	Music composer	Editor/Vfx Artist
Feb 7 2020	Sanglo	Biraj Bhatta, Nikita Chandak, Jayananda Lama, Kameshwor Chaurasiya, Prakash Shah	Biraj Bhatta	Biraj Bhatt	Suresh Adhikari/ Rajan Raj Shiwakoti	Arjun G.C.
Feb 7 2020	Selfie King	Bipin Karki, Laxmi Bardewa, Abhay Baral, Bhuwan Chand,	Bishal Sapkota	Dinesh Raut, Shuvash Thapa	Suraj Gaire	Jeevan Thapa
Feb 21 2020	Senti Virus	Sitaram Kattel, Kunjana Ghimire, Dayahang Rai, Wilson Bikram Rai, Buddhi Tamang	Rambabu Gurung	Dindu Lama Hyolmo	Rajanraj Shiwakoti	Nimesh Shrestha
Feb 24 2020	Love Diaries	Sushil Shrestha, Rubeena Thapa, Bishwojit Rimal	Saurav Chaudhary	Binod Sapkota	Arjun Pokharel	Movie Factory
March 14, 2020	Fichyo	Beeshwas Gurung, Kashi Ghale (Indra), Sub. Mantri Jung Gurung, Tikaram Ghale, Sita Devi Gurung, Kalyan Magar, Krishna Gurung, D.B Gurung, Pemba Tshering Sherpa, Birup Ghale, Anjana Gurung, Srijana Gurung & Villagers	Bikash Ghale Gurung	Santi M. Gurung, Sub. Mantri Jung Gurung, Buddhi Maya Gurung, and Avinash Mangsum	Santosh Shrestha, Ganesh Gurung	Bikash Ghale Gurung
2020	LAPPAN CHHAPPAN	Saugat Malla, Arpan Thapa, Anoop Bikram Shahi	Mukunda Bhatta	Chij Kumar Shrestha, Prakash Kunwar, Nirmal Kumar Mishra, Sudip Chandra Bhakrel, Santosh Chandra Bakhrel		Milan Shrestha
2020	Hero Returns (नायक भाग २)	Sabin Shrestha, Rekha Thapa, Dil Shrestha	Ashish Bhetwal	Bhim Neupane, Dhruba Neupane	Dipak Sharma, Tanka Budathoki	Mitra D. Gurung

=== 2021 ===
Release date	Film	Cast	Director	Producer	Music composer	Editor/Vfx Artist
December 31, 2021	Kathaputali - The Puppet	Mahesh Shakya	Veemsen Lama	Prithvi Rana Magar, Sampada Malla		

=== 2022 ===
Release date	Film	Cast	Director	Producer	Music composer	Editor/Vfx Artist
2022	Prem Geet 3	Pradeep Khadka	Santosh Sen & Chhetan Gurung	Santosh Sen		

=== 2023 ===
Release date	Film	Cast	Director	Producer	Music composer	Editor/Vfx Artist
March 3, 2023	Chhakka Panja 4	Deepak Raj Giri, Benisha Hamal, Kedar Ghimire, Neer Shah, Nirmal Sharma, Buddhi Tamang, Deepa Shree Niraula, Raj Acharya, Prem Pandey	Hem Raj BC	Dipendra Khaniya, Kesav Neupane, Kedar Ghimire, Nirmal Sharma		
April 14, 2023	Jaari	Dayahang Rai, Miruna Magar, Bijay Baral	Upendra Subba			
October 2, 2023; Rereleased:Nov 10, 2023	Dimag Kharab	Khagendra Lamichhane, Dayahang Rai, Swastima Khadka, Arpan Thapa, Bijay Baral	Nischal Basnet	Raunak Bikram Kandel		Nimesh Shrestha
October 21, 2023	Pashupati Prasad 2: Bhasme Don	Bipin Karki, Saugat Malla, Swastima Khadka	Dipendra K. Khanal	Khagendra Lamichhane	Subash Bhusal, Kiran Bhusal, Krishna Bhardwaj	Banish Shah / Dinesh Bista

=== 2024 ===
Notable Nepalese films released in 2024 include major box-office hits, critically acclaimed festival entries, and high-budget productions:Purna Bahadur Ko Sarangi – A social drama directed by Saroj Poudel that became the highest-grossing Nepali film of all time. Shambhala – An expensive, critically acclaimed Himalayan drama directed by Min Bahadur Bham that competed at the Berlinale and served as Nepal's Oscar submission. 12 Gaun – An action-drama directed by Biraj Bhatta that was a major festive release during Dashain.

This was a list of Nepalese films that were scheduled to be released in 2024.

Release date	Film	Cast	Director	Producer	Music composer	Editor/Vfx Artist
February 23, 2024	Shambhala	Thinley Lhamo, Sonam Topden, Tenzin Dalha, Karma Wangyal Gurung, Karma Shakya	Min Bahadur Bham	Shooney Films	Nhyoo Bajracharya	Kiran Shrestha, Ching Sung Liao
March 1, 2024	Agastya	Saugat Malla, Malika Mahat, Najir Hussain, Pramod Agrahari	Saurav Chaudhary			
March 22, 2024	Mahajatra	Hari Bansha Acharya, Bipin Karki, Rabindra Singh Baniya, Rabindra Jha, Barsha Raut	Pradip Bhattarai	Shatkon Arts	Ashish Aviral	Mitra D. Gurung
September 13, 2024	A Place Under the Sun	Min Ghalan, Meera Gurung, Amshu Sharma, Prajan Poudel, Biplov Gauli, Prabesh MC, Riden Shrestha	Jason Lopchan	One Squad Films	Prajwal Khadka	Jason Lopchan
October 10, 2024	12 Gaun	Biraj Bhatta, Samir Bhatt, Sonu Chandrapal, Deeya Maskey, Nancy Khadka, Stunt Silva	Biraj Bhatta	Biraj Bhatt Productions	Arjun Pokharel Niraj Singh	Bhupendra Adhikari Praveen K. L.
October 10, 2024	Chhakka Panja 5	Deepak Raj Giri, Kedar Ghimire, Deepa Shree Niraula, Barsha Siwakoti, Raja Ram Poudel, Prakash Ghimire	Deepa Shree Niraula	Aama Saraswoti Movies	Sambhujeet Baskota Dipak Sharma Babul Giri	Bipin Malla
31 October 2024	Purna Bahadur Ko Sarangi	Bijay Baral Mukun Bhusal Prakash Saput Anjana Baraili Swayam KC				

=== 2025 ===
This is a list of Nepalese films that were scheduled to be released in 2025.

Release date	Film	Cast	Director	Producer	Music composer	Editor/Vfx Artist
10 January	Karsang	Dayahang Rai, Jitu Nepal, Diya Maskey, Buddhi Tamang	Yam Sherpa	Yarsa Films	Manoj Thapa Magar, SD Yogi, Bishow Dong, Ashman Lopchan	Samir Miya
17 January	Firfire Firiri	Manoj Kumar Adhikari, Sandeep Shrestha, Bhawana Uprety	Nabin Bhatta	Bindhyabasini Creation		
17 January	Actor	Prince Thapa, Shiwani Giri, Kasis Dahal	Madan Ghimire	Nepali Diaspora Entertainment		Gautam Raj Khadka
24 January	Missing: Keti Harayeko Suchana	Shristhi Shrestha, Najir Husen	Deependra Gauchan	Tri-City Pictures	Deependra Gauchan, Pravesh Mallick, Karun Thapa	Nimesh Shrestha
29 January	Aktor Take 1	Pradeep Khadka, Raj Ballav, Anna Sharma	Rajan Bhusal	Adhreet Pictures	Hercules Basnet, Rohit Shakya, Alish Karki	Nimesh Shrestha/Dinesh Bista
14 February	Rangi		Suresh Neupane			
14 February	Dukhi Aatma		Dipendra Lama			
21 February	Tandavam		Junim Gahatraj			
28 February	Feri Resham Filili		Niroj Maharjan			
28 February	Mayavi		Diwakar Bhattarai			
28 February	Laaj Sharanam		Kumar Kattel			

=== 2026 ===
This is a list of Nepalese films that were scheduled to be released in 2026.

Release date	Film	Cast	Director	Producer	Music composer	Editor/Vfx Artist
15 January	Mormire	Dayahang Rai , Sonam				
27 March	Hami Teen Bhai	Binod Neupane, Laxmi Bardewa, Ashma Giri	Madhu Sudan Bhattarai	Sijat Mahat, Bikram Tamang	Sap Shakti , Babul Giri	Banish Shah (Editor) / Samir Miyan, Satyam Rana (VFX)
13 April	Pahad	Madan Krishna Shrestha, Bipin Karki				
24 April	Paral Ko Aago	Saugat Malla, Suhana Thapa, Prakash Saput				
25 April	Bhuthan (The World's Happiest Man)	Haribansha Acharya, Dayahang Rai	Binod Paudel	Abiral Thapa		
22 May	Mitjyu	Dayahang Rai, Saugat Malla, Teriya Magar, Shishir Bangdel	Anil Budha Magar			
17 July	Gauthali	Arun Chhetri, Simran Khadka	Kapil Rijal			

== See also ==
- List of foreign films shot in Nepal
- List of Nepal Bhasa films
- List of Nepalese films of 2001
- List of Nepalese films of 2002
- List of highest grossing Nepali films
