= Dinesh Sharma (actor) =

Nepalese film actor and director

- Born: Dinesh Sharma; 14 December 1970 (age 55); Siddharth Nagar-9, Rupandehi, Nepal
- Occupations: Actor, producer, director
- Years active: 1992–2017
- Website: Official Website

Dinesh Sharma (Nepali: दिनेश शार्मा) is a Nepalese film actor, producer, director and television personality. He started his career with movie “Chatyang” in 1992. Since then he acted in both negative and positive roles. He is regarded as one of the greatest villains in Nepali film industry. He officially retired from film industry before leaving Nepal to settle in United States in late 2017. He currently lives in Boston, Massachusetts.

== Biography ==
Dinesh Sharma started his acting debut with a supporting role in 1992 in the Nepali film Chatyang, the 80th Nepali film. It is produced by Bishwa Murti and directed by Pratap Subba. The actors in Chatyang are Rajesh Hamal, Gauri Malla, Dinesh Sharma, Rupa Rana, Tika Pahadi, Subhadra Adhikari, and Ramesh Budhathoki. Sharma directed the film Danav under his own banner, Rakshanda Films, and produced the Nepali film Antya. He has worked on more than 200 Nepali feature films as an actor in more than 25 years.

He has also had roles in TV serials including: Achanak, Parichaya Yatana, Gahana, Santan, Dui Thopa Aansu, and Bhumika. For social awareness, Dinesh Sharma has appeared in more than a dozen documentaries for awareness of HIV/AIDS and has taken part in an educational awareness program for Nepal's rural areas. His commercially successful feature films in a leading role are Chatyang (1992), Tuhuro (1993), Bandhan(1996) Gunynu cholo(1995), Jalan (1997) Daag (1999), Surakshaa (1999), Pocketmaar (1998), Mato Bolcha (1999), Dharmaputra (1999), Army (2000), Mann (2001), Sahar (2001), Sangam(2002), Ko Afno ko Birano(2005), Pratighat (2006), Jungali Manche (2006) and Antya (2007) etc.

== Selective filmography ==
Year	Film	Artists	Director	Producer	Music composer	Editor
1992	Chatyang (Lightning)	Rajesh Hamal, Dinesh Sharma, Gauri Malla	Pratap Subba			
1995	Gunyu Choli	Karishma Manandhar, Dinesh Sharma, Nawal Khadka	Amrit Sharma		Rajkumar Kutu	
1996	Nirmohi	Dinesh Sharma, Jal Shah, Saroj Khanal	Nayan Raj Pandey			
1996	Andolan (Strike)	Karishma Manandhar, Dinesh Sharma	Tirtha Thapa		Prakash Gurung	
1996	Bandhan (Imprison)	Rajesh Hamal, Karishma Manandhar, Melina Manandhar, Dinesh Sharma	Resh Raj Acharya	Sigdel Films	Subh Bahadur	
1997	Pocketmaar	Dinesh Sharma, Shree Krishna Shrestha	Raju Dhowj Rana			
1997	Jalan	Dinesh Sharma	Mukunda Bastakoti			
1998	Suraksha	Dinesh Sharma, Niruta Singh, Sunil Thapa	Armit Sharma			
1998	Malati	Dinesh Sharma, Shiv Shrestha	Anil Sangraula			
1999	Nepali Babu	Dinesh Sharma, Bhuwan KC, Sunil Thapa	Yugen Chhopel	Bhuwan KC		
1999	Dharmaputra	Dinesh Sharma, Rajesh Hamal, Niruta Singh	Yuva Raj Lama			
1999	Mato Bolcha	Rajesh Hamal, Bipana Thapa, Dinesh Sharma, Melina Manandhar	Resh Raj Acharya	Sayapatri Films		
1999	Timinai Basyau Mero Manma	Dinesh Sharma, Jal Shah, Sunil Thapa	Banni Pradhan			
2000	Mann Mero Mandaina	Dinesh Sharma, Bipana Thapa	Desh Bhakta Khanal	Chiranjiwi Baasnet		
2000	Shahar	Dinesh Sharma, Puja Chand	Suman Sarkar			
2000	Anjanai maa Maya Basla hai	Dinesh Sharma, Dilip Raymajhi	Chandra Prakash	Gopal Karmacharya		
2001	Aashirbad	Dinesh Sharma, Ram Krishna Dhakal, Rajesh Hamal, Jal Shah, Sanchita Luitel	Sambhu Pradhan	Gopal Karmacharya		
2001	Army	Dinesh Sharma, Lokendra Karki, Jal Shah	Shovit Basnet			
2001	Daag	Dinesh Sharma, Dhiren Shakya, Jal Shah, Rajani Rana		Akash Adhikari		
2001	Haudey	Dinesh Sharma, Ishwor Shrestha	Suraj Subba			
2001	Ke Bho Lau Na Ni	Dinesh Sharma, Anupama Koirala, Sushil Chhetri, Shiva Shrestha	Anish Koirala			
2001	Nepal Pyaro Chha	Dinesh Sharma, Rajesh Hamal, Jal Shah, Ramesh Upreti	Sambhu Pradhan		Subash Gautam	
2001	Ladai	Dinesh Sharma, Sushil Chhetri	Badri Adhikari			
2002	Maan	Dinesh Sharma, Rejina Uprety, Uttam Pradhan, Jay Kishan Basnet	Sovit Basnet			
2002	Andhi Tufan	Dinesh Sharma, Richa Ghimire				
2002	Malati	Dinesh Sharma, Shiva Shrestha, Jal Shah, Shrisha Karki	Anil Sangraula			
2002	Santan Ko Maya	Dinesh Sharma, Rajesh Hamal, Sarita Lamichhane, Puja Chand	Kishore Rana		Tika Bhandari	
2002	Santan Thari Thari Ka	Dinesh Sharma, Dilip Ray Majhi				
2003	Dhadkan	Dinesh Sharma, Nikhil Upreti, Rekha Thapa	Naresh Poudyal	Naresh Poudyal		
2003	Sangram	Dinesh Sharma, Melina Manandhar	Mahendra Budhathoki	Raj Kumar Rai		
2003	Bhagya	Dinesh Sharma, Nikhil Upreti	Prakash Bhattarai	Sunil Datta Pandey		
2004	Bhagya Bidhata	Dinesh Sharma, Rajesh Hamal, Rupa Rana	Dayaram Dahal	Chiranjiwi Basnet		
2004	Krishna Arjun	Dinesh Sharma, Rajesh Hamal	Deepak Shrestha	Chiranjiwi Basnet		
2004	Jwalamukhi	Mahendra Budhathoki				
2005	Abhimanyu	Dinesh Sharma, Nikhil Upreti	Naresh Poudyal	Mounta Shrestha		
2006	Duniya	Dinesh Sharma, Nikhil Upreti	Shiva Regmi			
2006	Krodh	Nikhil Upreti, Akash Adhikari, Jal Shah, Rekha Thapa, Usha Paudel, Dinesh Sharma		Akash Adhikari	Laxmzn Shah, Suresh Adhikari	
2007	Antya	Dinesh Sharma, Usha Poudel	Basudev Pokharel	Dinesh Sharma		
2007	Paapi Manchhe	Dinesh Sharma, Nikhil Upreti	Deepak Shrestha	Raj Kumar Raai		
2007	Ma Maya Garchhu	Dinesh Sharma, Rajesh Hamal, Ayush Rijal	Raj Shakya			
2008	Himmat	Dinesh Sharma, Rekha Thapa				
2008	Pratighat	Dinesh Sharma, Prerana Sharma, Rakshanda Sharma	Basudev Pokharel	Dinesh Sharma		
2009	Deewanapan (Craziness)	Dinesh Sharma, Arunima Lamsal, Raj Ballav Koirala	Krishna Chapagain			
2009	Kohi Mero	Dinesh Sharma, Jharana Bajracharya	Alok Nengbang			
2009	Izzatdar (Respectful)	Dinesh Sharma, Rajesh Hamal, Biraj Bhatta, Arjun Karki	Krishna Chapagain			
2009	Kanoon (Law)	Dinesh Sharma, Rajesh Hamal				
2009	Mahan (Great)	Dinesh Sharma, Biraj Bhatta, Jharana Thapa, Jaykishan Basnet	Krishna Chapagain	Dinesh Sharma		
2011	Mero Pyaro Maitighar	Dinesh Sharma, Dilip Ray Majhi	Uday Subba			
2011	Annadata	Ramit Dhungana, Dinesh Sharma, Rohan Dhakal, Shibu Singh, Nishan Shahi Dhakal	Niraj Ghimire	Rohan Dhakal		
2012	Yoddha	Dinesh Sharma, Rajesh Hamal	Uday Subba			
2015	Danav	Dinesh Sharma, Mahima Silwal, Teja Ayer	Dinesh Sharma	Dinesh Sharma		
2016	Ram-Jane	Dinesh Sharma, Rohit Rumba, Teja Ayer	Janak Khakurel	Dinesh Sharma		
2016	Driver Dai	Dinesh Sharma, Seema Kc		BS Balami		
2017	Hirasat	Dinesh Sharma, Teja Ayer	Dinesh Sharma	Dinesh Sharma		

== Upcoming projects ==
Dinesh Sharma's latest production is the feature film Dil Bichara.

== See also ==
- List of Nepalese actors
