= Shreedev Bhattarai =

Nepali actor

bhesh kumar bhattarai(Shreedev Bhattarai)
- श्रीदेव भट्टराई
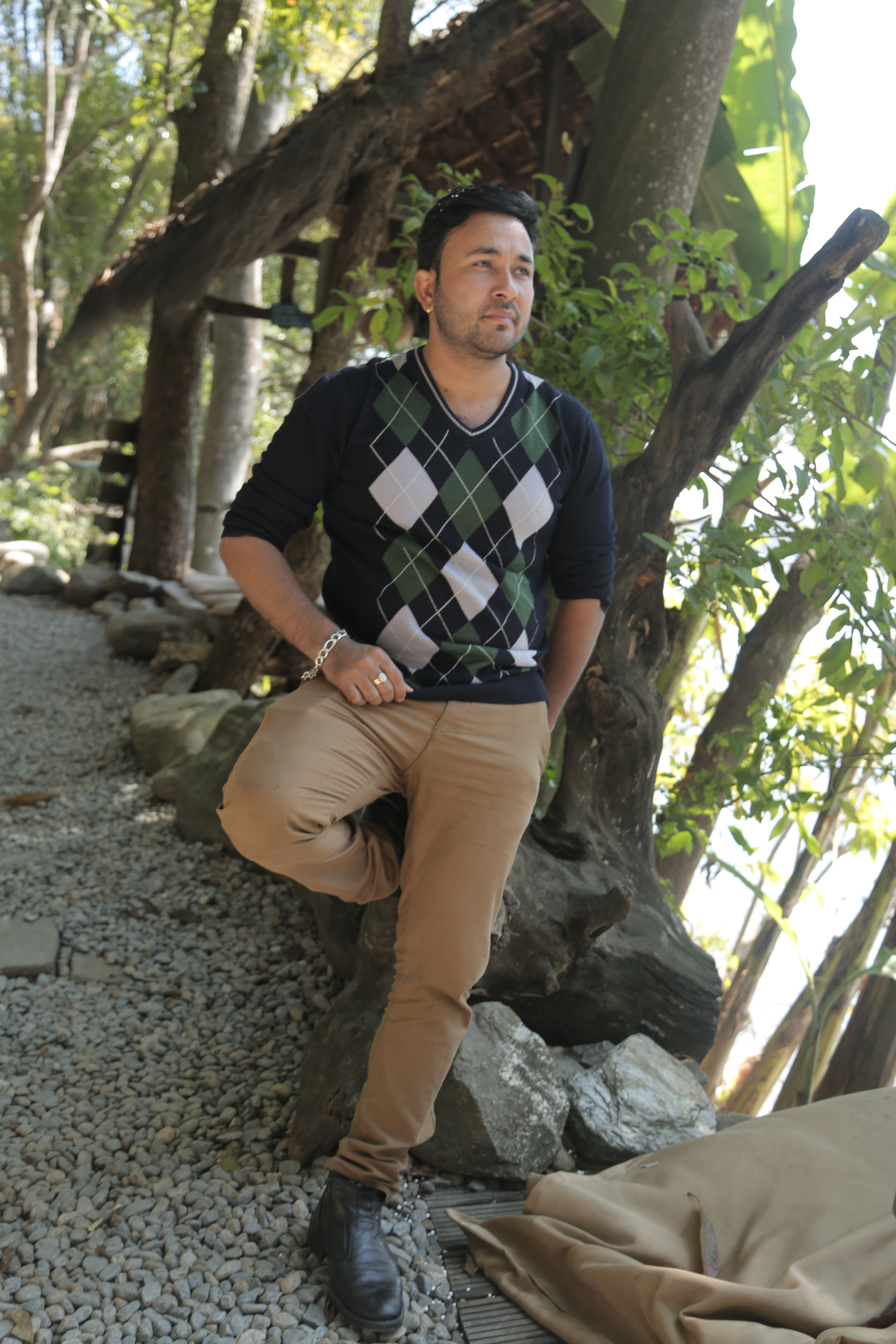
- Born: Ilam, Nepal
- Occupations: Actor, lyricist
- Years active: 2004–present
- Organization(s): Shreedev Media and Production Pvt.Ltd.
- Known for: Bhaimara, New Generation, Birano maya, Koineto, Dhunge yug 2 (The Human Civilization ), Sukulgunda, Chhal

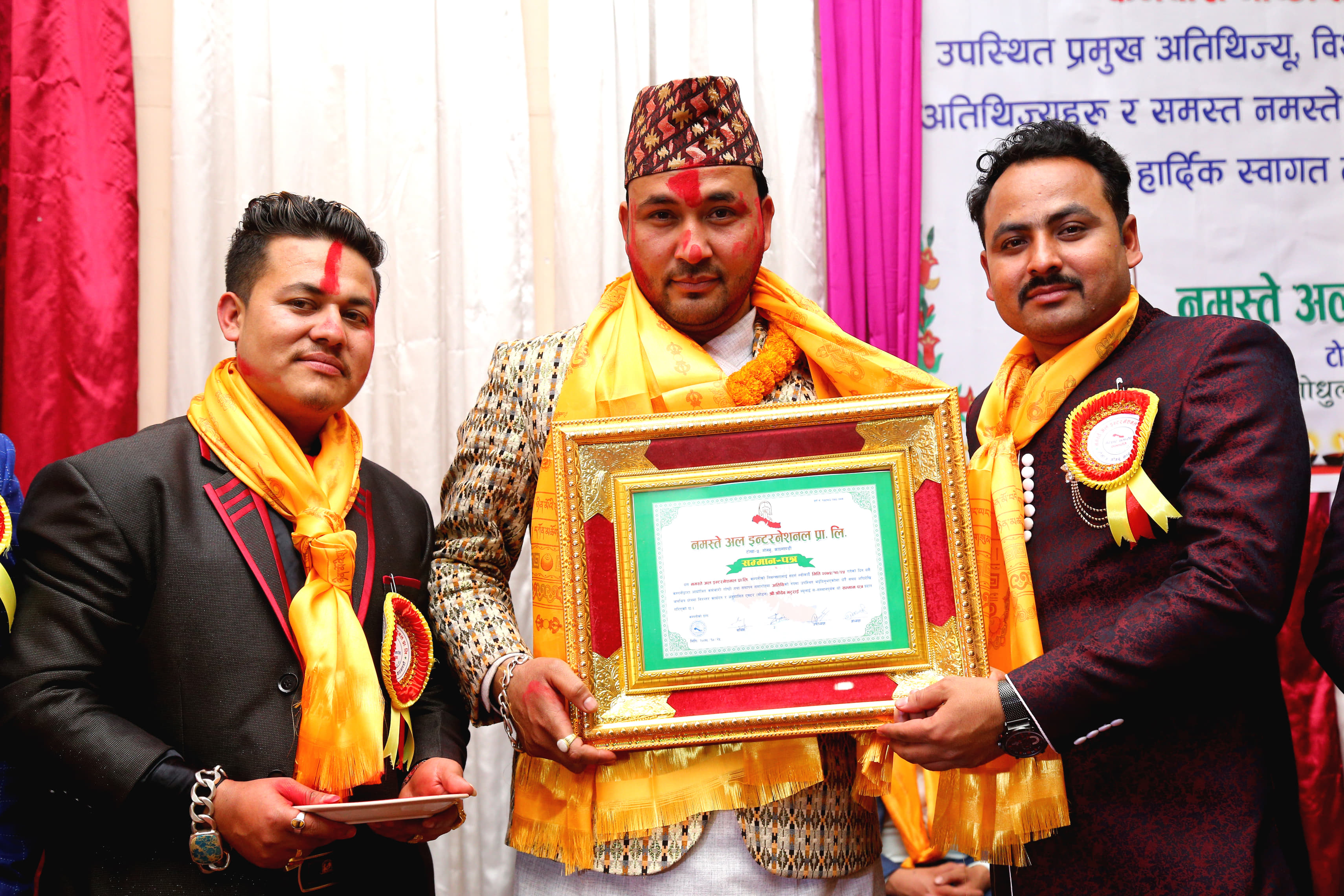

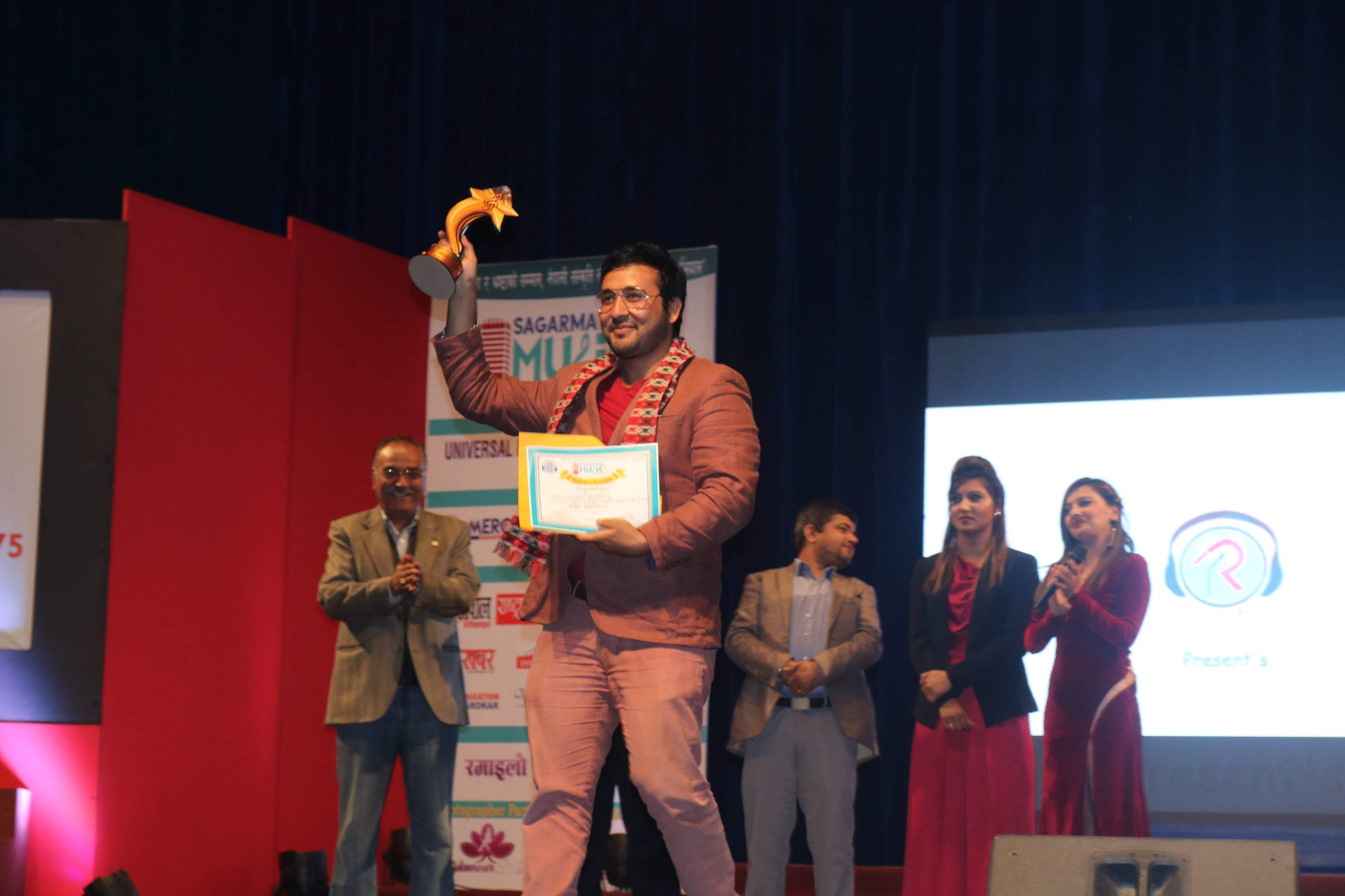

Shreedev Bhattarai (Nepali: श्रीदेव भट्टरार्इ; is a Nepali actor and lyricist. He was born in Ilam, eastern Nepal.

== Career ==
He debuted in silver screen through movie Bhaimara and also has worked in some other movies. He has worked in more than 10 dozens music videos as model. He has shared screen with artists of Nepali film industry like Dinesh Sharma, Sushil Chhetri, Garima Panta, Jiwan Luitel, Anu Shah, Namrata Sapkota, Dinesh D.C., Sushil Pokharel, Surbir Pandit, Ramchandra Adhikari, Dipasha B.C., Anju Niraula, etc. and has also worked with filmmakers like Madhab Raj Kharel, Bhabindra Tamang, Madhusudan Bhattarai, Shiva Ghimire, Kajish Shrestha, Rupesh Upreti, etc. He also has worked with the veteran singers of Nepali music industry like Rajesh Payal Rai, Pramod Kharel, Aditya Narayan Jha, Anju Panta, Satya Raj Acharya, Sworup Raj Acharya, Shiva Pariyar, Mandabi Tripathi, etc.

Filmography
Film title	Title meaning	Director	Roles
Bhai Mara	Social Drama	Hari Udashi	Actor
Naya Pidi	New Generation	Bhabindra Tamang	Actor
Chhal	Trick	Shiva Ghimire	Actor
Birano Maya	Solitude Love	Madhab Raj Kharel	Actor
Kuineto	Turning of Life	Madhab Raj Kharel	Actor
Chaal	Man Trick	Rupesh Uprety	Actor
Dhunge yug 2	Stone Era2 (The Human Civilization )	Madhab Raj Kharel	Actor
Sukulgunda	Rancour	Madhusudan Bhattarai	Actor
Chithi	letter	madhab raj kharel	Actor

Music Video
Song title	Singer	Role
Khulla Chha Dilko	Ashok / Manisha	Actor
Dherai Maya diyi malai	Anju Panta	Actor
K Diyau ra k pauthe	Anju Panta	Actor
Khali Thiya ma	Shiva Pariyar	Actor
‘हाम्रो साझा हिमाल’ सार्वजनिक (भिडियोसहित)	Shreedev Bhattarai	Actor
Khel Haina Mero Maya	Pramod Kharel	Actor
Baiguni Raichhau Mayalu	Rajesh Payal Rai	Actor
Timro Anchal ma	Swroopraj Acharya	Actor
Birsideu Bhanchhau....	Drisya Subedi	Actor
Dhukdhuki Manma Aandhi	Indira Bhattarai	Actor
Najauna Chhodi Malai	Shridev Bhattarai	Actor/ Singer
Pahilo Maya ko	Shiva Adhikari	Actor
Yada tmro aaye rahyo	Yubaraj Chamlagain	Actor
Kina Aaucha Yaad	Melina Rai	Actor
anjurani manju rani	raj sagar	actor
Suger Free	Rajendra/Asmita	actor
Pida	Barsha	actor

Lyrics written
Film title	Singer
Bache Timi Sanga	Anil Birahi
Purano Hudaina Maya	Deepak Limbu/ Mandabi Tripathi
New Generation(Naya Pidi)	Shreedev Bhattrai,
Aayo Aayo	Deepak Limbhu/ Yogita Moktan

== Awards and honors ==
=== Awards ===
Award Title	Award Category	Title of film/video
4th National Capital Award 2018	Best actor	Baiguni Rahechhau Mayalu
Model Song's Award 2018	Best actor	Birano Maya
7th Music Khabar Music Award 2018	Best actor	Koiliko Jasto
Sagarmatha Music Award	Best Actor	Baiguni Rahichhau Mayalu
D Cine Award 2019	Best Actor "jury"	Sukulgunda
Chaya Chabi International Honour Award " Thailand " 2018	Best Actor	Birano Maya
Star International Award "Qatar" 2019	Best Actor "Discipline"	Birano Maya
Nepal-Africa film festival	Actor (juri)	kuineto
3rd Star International Award	Decade Actor Award	
Global International Award - 2022	Best Actor Award	Pida
6th ecxylend honor award India	Best model/ actor Nepal	
2th AMS indernational honor award	Best actor award Japan	

=== Honors ===
Phalame Pokhari Yuwa Samman dolakha Nepal– 2015
Musician Association Samman – 2015
Media and Entertainment Artists Samman – 2016
Most disciplined artists Samman – 2018
Namaste All International Pvt. Ltd.Nepal Artistic Samman – 2018
NCIFF Artist Samman – 2018
Natswayari Kalakarita Samman - 2018
Star One Kalakarita Samman
guinness book world certificate 2019
gourisangkhar chorolpa art honor 2021
Inas kala samman2021[dubai]
national tribute samman 2021[ktm]
globel samman 2021[dubai]
Global tourism actor honour
Evergreen World Wide Entertainment" dasakau kala samman
kala paryatan samman 2023 srilangka
Inas kalakarita sammaan 2024 dubai
