= List of foreign films shot in Nepal =

Nepal has provided an exotic and mystical backdrop to numerous international films set mostly or partly in Nepal. A good many overseas films shot in Nepal come from Bollywood and Hollywood film industries, which are two of the biggest cinema industries in the world.

The following is a compilation of foreign films shot largely or partly in Nepal. The list, however, doesn't cover those that were set in Nepal but shot elsewhere, such as The Expendables 2.

== # ==
- 10 Endrathukulla

== A ==
- The Arabian Nights
- Aandhi-Toofan

== B ==
- Banarasi Babu
- Baby
- Baraka
- Beyond the Edge
- Beqabu

== D ==
- Doctor Strange
- Deewana Main Deewana
- Doctor Strange multiverse of madness

== E ==
- Everest
- Even When I Fall

== F ==
- The Fall

Farzi

== G ==
- Gharwali Baharwali
- The Golden Child

== H ==
- High Ground
- Highway to Dhampus
- Himalaya
- The Himalayas
- Hare Rama Hare Krishna

== I ==
- India's Most Wanted
- Intlo Illalu Vantintlo Priyuralu

== J ==
- Johny Mera Naam

== K ==
- Katmandu, A Mirror in the Sky
- Khuda Gawah
- Kathmandu (TV series)
- Kathmandu Connection
- Khoj (1989 film)

== L ==
- The Legend of Wisely
- Little Buddha
- Love in Nepal

== M ==
- Mahaan
- Mirai

== P ==
- Padi Padi Leche Manasu
- Powaqqatsi

== R ==
- Returned: Child Soldiers of Nepal's Maoist Army**

== S ==
- Seven Years in Tibet
- Sherpa

== T ==
- Thaikulame Thaikulame
- The Night Train to Kathmandu
- The Third Generation
- To the North of Katmandu
- The Touch
- The Sari Soldiers
- The Fall
- The Wildest Dream
- The Climb

== U ==
- Up to His Ears

== W ==
- The Wildest Dream
- Witch from Nepal

== Y ==
- Yevade Subramanyam
- Yodha
- Yudh
- Yaara
