= Chetan Karki =

Nepalese songwriter (1938–2021)

- चेतन कार्की
- Born: 07 November, 1938; Syanja, Arukharka, Nepal
- Died: 16 May 2021 (aged 82)
- Occupations: Songwriter; Director; Screen writer
- Years active: 1981–2021
- Children: 2

Chetan Karki (7 November 1938 – 16 May 2021) was a Nepali songwriter and film director. According to Prakash Sayami, Karki was the first screenwriter of Nepali cinema, having written his first screenplay for Pariwartan. He went on to write stories for more than a hundred Nepali films. He directed Bishwas, Pahilo Prem and Bhumari. He wrote songs for the films Maya Priti, Kanchi and Kanyadan, among others. Teejako Rahara Aayo Barilai is considered his most popular song.

As a writer, Karki published a poem, a collection of songs, a story and a novel. He also published poetry collections in Hindi and Urdu languages.

== Filmography ==
Year	Title	Role	Ref
1988	Maya Priti	Director	
	Bishwas	Director	
	Pahilo Prem	Director	
	Bhumari	Director	
	Kanchi	Director	
	Kanyadan	Director	

== Songs ==
Year	Title	Role	Ref
	Bainiko Dayacha bhane	Lyricist	

== Publication ==
Year	Title	Role	Ref
	Aatma bechey ko chaina		

== Death ==
Karki died on 16 May 2021, from COVID-19 at the age of 83.
