= A Place Under the Sun (film) =

- Directed by: Jason Lopchan
- Written by: Jason Lopchan
- Produced by: Umesh Khadka, Jason Lopchan
- Starring: Biplov Gauli; Amshu Sharma; Prajan Poudel; Min Ghalan; Meera Gurung; Riden Shrestha; Prabesh Mahatara Chhetri
- Cinematography: Prabin Limbu
- Music by: Prajjwal Khadka
- Production company: One Squad Films
- Distributed by: MSM Video
- Release date: September 13, 2024
- Running time: 105 minutes
- Country: Nepal
- Language: Nepali

A Place Under the Sun is a 2024 Nepali independent crime film written, produced, and directed by Jason Lopchan. The film is notable for being the first Nepalese feature film to be captured entirely using an iPhone 14 Pro Max smartphone. It stars an ensemble indie cast including Biplov Gauli, Amshu Sharma, Prajan Poudel, Min Ghalan, and Meera Gurung.

Produced by One Squad Films, the movie had a limited domestic theatrical release followed by premiering globally in MSM Video.

== Synopsis ==
The plot revolves around three childhood best friends who reunite for a celebratory party following a local school robbery. The celebratory atmosphere takes a sudden turn when an uninvited, mysterious stranger arrives at their gathering, completely disrupting the event and escalating tensions as the broader crime story begins to unfold.

== Cast ==
- Biplov Gauli
- Amshu Sharma
- Prajan Poudel
- Min Ghalan
- Meera Gurung
- Riden Shrestha
- Prabesh Mahatara Chhetri (Prabesh M.C.)
- Vikash Suvedi

== Production ==
=== Development ===
The film served as the second directorial project for filmmaker Jason Lopchan, a 2019 graduate specializing in direction and screenwriting from the Oscar International College of Film Studies (Kathmandu). Following the completion of his debut feature in 2021,the project remained unreleased due to operational challenges, Lopchan and his creative circle opted to bypass standard studio financing model to maintain full creative authority and operational flexibility over the production and release schedule.

=== Filming ===
The production of A Place Under the Sun was executed entirely without financial aid from traditional industry financiers.[1] Instead of industry-grade camera systems, the production team utilized an iPhone 14 Pro Max to capture all cinematic sequences.[2] The technical choice was driven by a shared interest in existing smartphone-shot cinema, the mobile device's adaptability on location, and its significantly minimized setup time during shooting compared to heavyweight professional camera rigs.[1][7][8]

== Release ==
While initial strategies intended for a standard domestic theatrical run across screens in Nepal, the budgetary overheads associated with commercial distribution led the producers to focus squarely on web channels.[3] The project was formally announced around the Nepali New Year in mid-April 2024. 

The film premiered in CDC Cinemas in September 13, 2024 with limited theatrical release, and streaming in MSM Video.

== Reception ==
The film received generally positive reviews, with praise directed towards the performances, cinematography, score and unorthodox storytelling. Reviewers also highlighted Lopchan's ambition and willingness to move away from the conventions of mainstream nepali commercial cinema. However, some criticism was directed towards Lopchan's unconventional narrative approach and the film's pacing, particularly in the first half.
