= Rose Rana =

Nepalese movie producer, actor, businessman, and politician

- रोज राणा
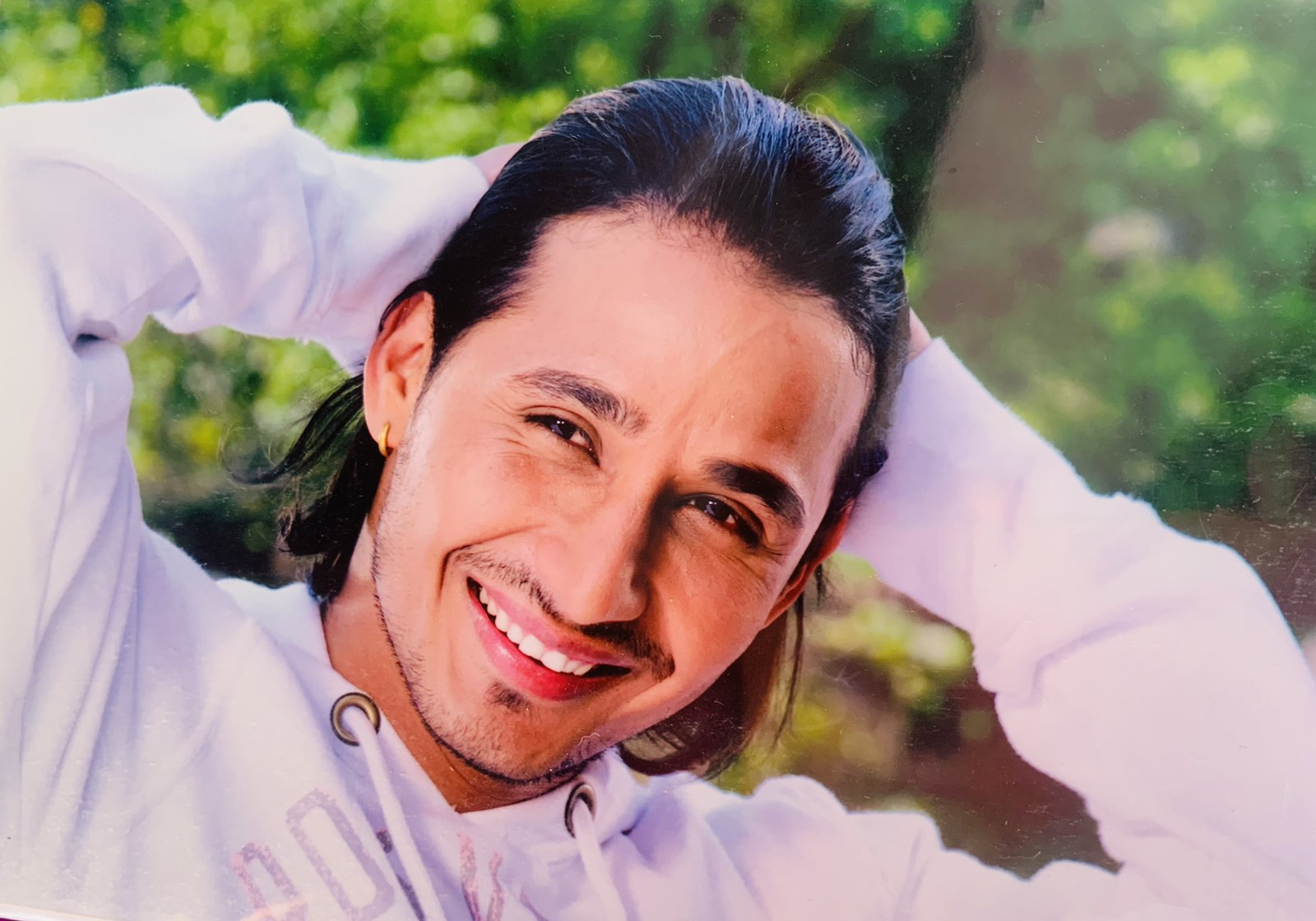
- Rose Rana for Photoshoot

Personal details
- Born: Saroj Thapa pyuthan
- Party: Nepali Congress
- Spouse: Upama KC (2007-present)

Rose Rana is a Nepali movie producer, actor, businessman and politician. He is General Secretary of the Nepal Film Producer Association.

== Early life and education ==
Rana (family name Saroj Thapa) was born in Syaulibang village of Pyuthan District. He changed his name to Rose Rana after he moved back to Kathmandu.

Rana entered into movie industry as an actor. He then started producing movies. Some of his movies are Khalanayak, Don, Dosti, Takkar Dui Mutuko, and Ma Chhu Ni Timro.

== Politics ==
Rana is actively involved in Nepali Congress Politics. He was elected President of Pyuthan Constitutional Assembly No 2.

On Provincial election of Nepal 2022, Rose Ran a has been elected as MLA from Pyuthan "2" on Lumbini Province.
