= L N Gautam =

Nepalese film director

Lok Nath Gautam L.N Gautam
- Born: 20 March 1981 (age 45); Ramechhap, Nepal
- Occupations: Film Director; Producer
- Years active: 2005–present
- Known for: L N Gautam
- Parents: Tanka Prasad Gautam (father); Laxmi Gautam (mother)

L N Gautam known as Loknath Gautam(born 20 March 1981 at Ramechhap district, Nepal) is a Nepalese film director in the local film industry for more than 12 years. He has started his career in this sector as an assistant director and actor. Later on, he paid attention on other dimensions of filmmaking such as production, cinematography, and direction besides acting. He has produced and directed several Nepali movies, documentaries and also music videos. His work as a director include the films Love is Life, and Romance. He has won many awards.

== Early life ==
Gautam was passionate about movies since his childhood. In 2005, he got an opportunity to work in Nepali film as assistant director. In the same year, he directed and played in another Nepali film. Since then, his professional career takes up. Mr. Gautam loves being versatile in his profession. Though he had started his journey as actor-cum-director.

== Filmography ==
Movie	Year	Role
Love is Life	2013	Director
Romance	2015	Director
