= Madhab Raj Kharel =

Nepali film director

- माधव राज खरेल
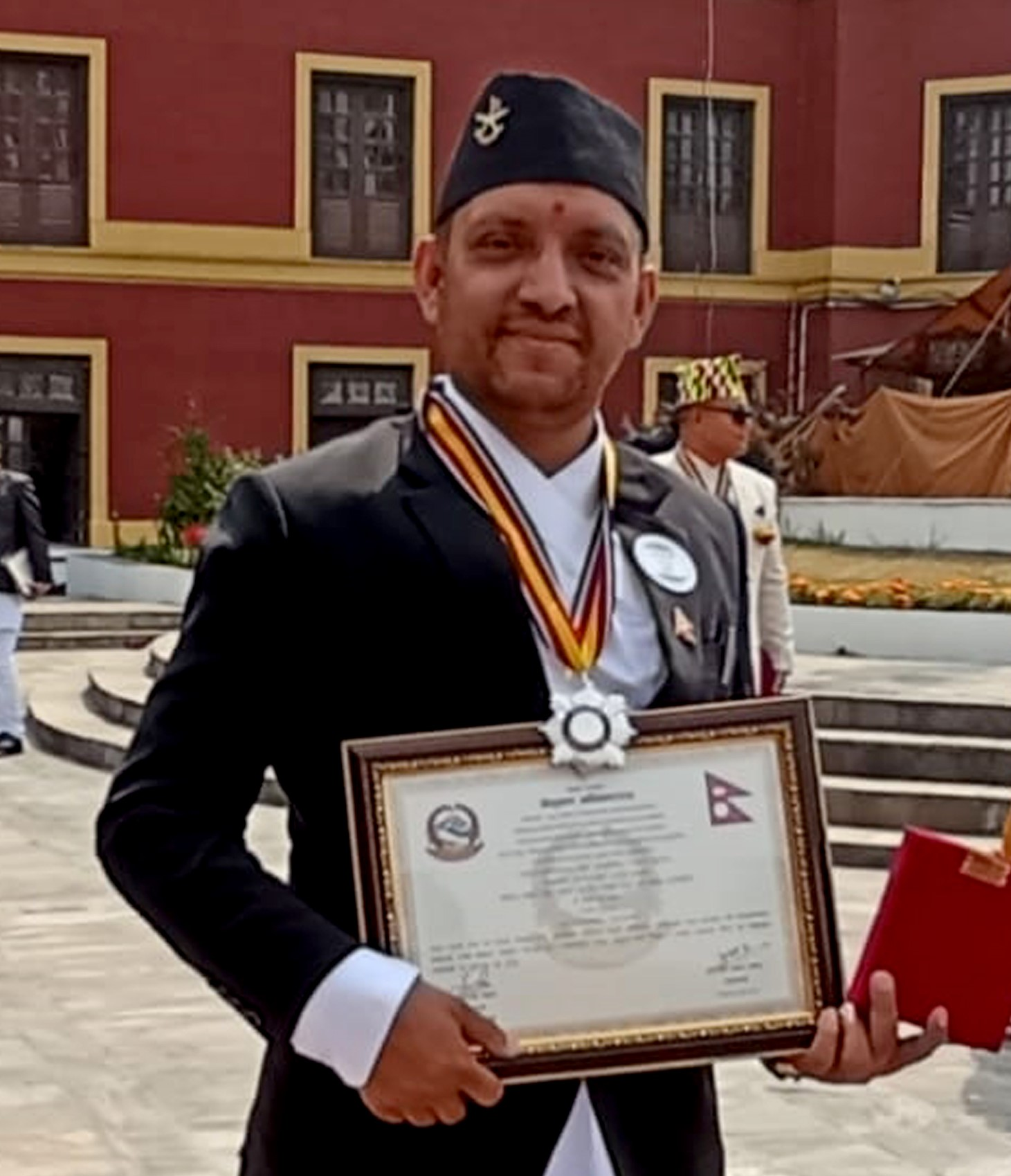
- Kharel in 2023
- Born: June 8, 1982 (age 44); Kavrepalanchowk, Nepal
- Occupations: Director, actor, producer, writer
- Years active: 1998–present
- Organization(s): Chairman- PIM Nepal, Publisher - Power News national monthly Magazine
- Spouse: Kamala Kumari Joshi
- Awards: Samjhana Digital(D-Cine) Award (2010), NCIFF Best Woman Film Award (2018), National Short Film Award (2023)

Madhab Raj Kharel(Nepali: माधव राज खरेल ) is a Neplease Movie director, writer and producer. He was Born on june 8,1982 on kavreplanchwok district of Nepal. Kharal has been actively involved in the Nepali film industry since 1998 (2055 B.S.). He started his career as a chorus dancer and later the role of associate director.

== Biography ==
He has been produced and directed numerous television dramas like Kasto Yo Jiwan and Kashur (2002–2003) AD. Birano Maya (2016), A silent Movie Dhunge Yug (2009) , A research based movie Dhunge Yug 2 (In search of civilization) (2016) are some movies produced by him. He has been awarded from different awards including "Box Office Film Fare Award", "Blockbuster Film Award" and "Samjhana Digital(D-Cine) Award for Best Director (2010), from movie Dhunge Yug

He established a movie-producing company named " Media and Entertainment Pvt. Ltd." in 2008. He has produced and directed more than 2 dozens documentary from 2009 to 2015 namely Gadhimai, Gantabya Kusheshwor, Yatra Sefoksundo, Nepal Yatra, etc., and music videos in the same number, and also has scripted and directed many programs broadcast on Nepal Television, S.T.V., News24, etc. He has adapted the novel Durgamandu to the film of the same name which exposes and challenges malfunction, misconduct and superstition like Chhaupadi system, single woman, Bokshi (witch) system and another sort of social weaknesses existing in Far Western Region of Nepal.

== Filmography ==
=== Director ===
Year	Film title	Title Meaning	Starring Crew	Role
2009	Dhunge Yug	Stone Era	Dil Krishna Shrestha, Sabina Pokharel, Laxman Tiwari, Avon Raj Uprety, etc.	Writer/ Director
2011	Hye Be Karit Bor	Will be auspicious	Renu Yadhav, Anadesh kamat, Prakesh Mishra, Ashok Dutta, Ratna raut, etc.	Writer/ Director
2014	Birano Maya	Solitude Love	Shreedev Bhattarai, Dinesh DC, Namrata Sapkota, Dipasha BC, Rohit Rumbha, Surbir Pandit, Madhab Kharel etc.	Director
2015	Koineto	Turning of Life	Shreedev Bhattarai, Saniya Khan, Sriju Adhikari, NR Rimal, Ganga Bhujel, Keshav Sapkota etc.	Writer/ Director
2015	Dhunge Yug 2	Stone Era 2	Shreedev Bhattarai, Prajol Giri, Soniya Sharma, Mahima Silwal, Sanjog Rana, Bhuwan Bhujel, Shanker Maharjan etc.	Writer/ Director
2018	Durgamandu	Hidden Story Of Far western Nepal	Saniya Khan, Kamala Joshi, Ganga bhujel, Min Bd. Bohora, Siddharaj Timalsina, Tara Yakkha, etc.	Writer/ Director
2022	Chithi(Letter)	Comedy Movie	Sanjit Bhandari, Gopal Dhakal (Chhande) Khadga Bahadur Pun Kha Ba Pu, Muskan lama, Kanchan Chalise, Nab raj Thapa, etc.	Writer/ Director
2024	Mrityu kosh(Upcoming)	Death Fund		Writer/ Director

=== Actor ===
Year	Film title	Title Meaning	Credit	ref
2009	Timi Jaha Bhaye Pani	Wherever you are	Film Director	
2014	Fulai Fulko Mausam Timilai	This season of flowers	Actor	
2015	Birano Maya	Solitude Love	Actor	
2015	3 Monkeys	Three Monkeys	Actor	
2015	Dhunge Yug 2	Stone Era 2	Actor	
2017	Durgamandu	Hidden Story of Far-Western Nepal	Actor	
2022	Chitthi		Actor	

=== Documentary films ===
Year	Documentary Title	Role
2009	Gadimai 2066 (Shree media search & movie maker)	Writer/Director
2010	Destination kusheswor (Nepal Government)	Director
2012	Destination Shey-phoksundo lake (Nepal Government)	Director
2014	Save Earth Quick (Nepal Government)	Writer/Director
2015	Save Monkey (Wild Life Watch Group)	Director

=== Lyrics written ===
Song name	Singer	Music director
Kasto yo jiwan	Rekha Ghimire	Sudarshan Shiwakoti
Kahi ta raat	Sashi B. Thapa	Ramesh Shrestha
Sapana Haru Ta	Shisir Yogi	Manoj Chaulagain
Maya Le polyo	Sudarshan Shiwakoti	Sudarshan Shiwakoti
Tadpiyera banchu kati	Sudarshan Shiwakoti	Sudarshan Shiwakoti
Kahile Hasoma	Sudarshan Shiwakoti	Sudarshan Shiwakoti
Barsau bityo	Sudarshan Shiwakoti	Sudarshan Shiwakoti
Sital tapnu	Sudarshan Shiwakoti and Sunita Dulal	Sudarshan Shiwakoti
Sirupate ooth timro	Ramesh Shrestha	Ramesh Shrestha
Jali Maya	Prakesh Dhali	Ramesh Shrestha
Mero Desh KoJhanda	Mohan Kshitiz Aauji	Manoj Chaulagain
Nagaki Naina	Narayan Babu Koirala	Narayan Babu Koirala
Pani Paryo Banaima	Krishna Kafle/Annu Chaudhari	Rajendra Bajgai
Saraba Mujhko	Sasi Bikram Thapa	Chrinjibi Bhandari

== Awards and honors ==
=== Awards ===
Award	Category	Title	Notes	Result
Box Office Film Fair Award 2010	Best Director	Dhunge yug (Stone Era)	First Nepali Silent Movie	won
Blockbuster Film Award 2010	Best Director	Dhunge yug (Stone Era)	First Nepali Silent Movie	won
Dcine Award 2010 (Jury Award)	Best Director	Dhunge yug (Stone Era)	First Nepali Silent Movie	won
Sundardevi sandesh Music Award- 2015	Best Director	Dhoka ta	Video song	won
Music Khabar Music Award - 2015	Best National Feelings Song	Mero Deshko Jhanda	Video song	won
Sundardevi sandesh Music Award- 2018	Best Director	Maya le polyo	Video song	won
Model Songs and INAS Dubai Award - 2018	Best Director	Birano Maya	Film	won
Sagarmatha Music Award- 2018	Best Director	Bijaudo rahechha	Video song	won
NCIFF Best Woman Film Award 2018	Best Director	Durgamandu	Film	won
NCIFF Best Woman Film Award 2018	Best Director	Durgamandu	Film	won
9th Nepal Africa Film Festival-2021	Best Director	Durgamandu	Film	won
National Entertainment Award-2021	Best Director(Jury)	Durgamandu	Film	won
NCIFF Award-2021	Best Director	Kuineto	Film	won
spiny babbler International Film Festival-2021	Best Director	Kuineto	Film	won
10th Nepal Africa Film Festival-2022	Best Director	Kuineto	Film	won
National Silver Award - 2022	Best Director	Kuineto	Film	won
Captivating Creation Award - 2023 (india)	Best Director - Decade			
4th Nepal Short Film Award - 2023	Best Director	Durgamandu	Film	won

=== Honors ===
Year	Honor Title
2015	Geetkar Sang Nepal
2016	ICT Honor
2018	Box Office Music Video Award Honor
2017	National Folk Cultural Association Honor
2018	Jana Aakash Chalachitra Samman
2018	In to The Himalayan Honor
2018	Pal Entertainment Honor
2018	Namaste All International Honor
2018	Human Welfare Foundation Honor
2019	Natyashwor Film Honor
2019	Shikhar Personality Honor
2019	Guinness Book of World Records - 2019
2021	Pariwartan Bishesh Samman
2021	Chhayanchhabi Kirtimani Samman - 2077
2021	Himalayan International Kirtimani Samman- 2077
2022	Government of Nepal Janasewashree Padak
2022	National Intertainment Chalchatra karmi Samman
2022	Ever green Chalchatra karmi Samman
2021	Sagarmatha Sangit Ratna Samman
2022	JanaSewaShree - Nepal Government 2023
2022	Tarakeshwar Rastriya Chalchitrakarmi Samman
2023	Anuradha Films Bises Bektito Samman
2023	Rastriya Chalchitra NIrdeshak Samman
