= Ramit Dhungana =

Nepali film actor

- रमित ढुगााँना
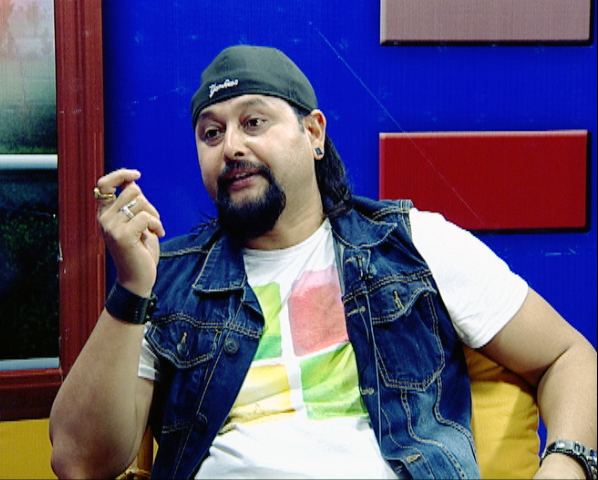
- Dhungana in 2016
- Born: September 24, 1977 (age 48); Nepal
- Occupation: Actor
- Years active: 2003-2016

Ramit Dhungana (Nepali: रमित ढुगााँना) is an actor who primarily works in the Cinema of Nepal. He made his debut in 2003 with the film Maya Namara for which he received the National Film award. In 2017, he received a Letter of Appreciation from the Nepali government for his promotion of Buddhism and peace.

== Career ==
Dhungana worked on almost 100 films. His notable movies include Maya Namara with Rajesh Hamal, Muglan with Dilip Rayamajhi, Dewar Babu with Biraj Bhatta, Dhadkan with Nikhil Upreti, Jeevandata with Rajesh Hamal, Biraj Bhatta, and Jharana Thapa, and Himmat with Rekha Thapa. He acted in the movie Sundar Mero Naam with Deepak Raj Giri to raise awareness about autism. His most recent movie is Buddha Born in Nepal filmed at Cornell University, which aims to raise awareness about politics and education.

== Filmography ==
Films
Movie	Role	Year
Buddha Born In Nepal	Producer, Cast	May 20, 2016
Dushmani	Cast	Sep 20, 2013
Palpalma	Cast	Oct 23, 2011
Annadata	Cast	Aug 12, 2011
The Most Wanted	Cast	Jul 22, 2011
Chino	Cast	Jan 14, 2011
Sundar Mero Naam	Cast	Oct 26, 2010
Guru Dakshina	Cast	Oct 22, 2010
Bidai	Cast	Oct 15, 2010
Mero K Gati Hune Ho	Cast	Sep 03, 2010
Himmat	Cast	Apr 09, 2010
Tahalka Dot Com	Cast	Jan 13, 2010
Rajya	Cast	Oct 26, 2009
Nepali Veer	Cast	Jul 26, 2009
Dhoom	Cast	Jul 07, 2009
Farz	Cast	Jan 04, 2009
Danveer	Cast	Dec 07, 2008
Jiwan Mrityu	Cast	Nov 07, 2008
Ghatak 'The Thriller'	Cast	Feb 15, 2008
Dar	Cast	Jan 09, 2008
Mrityunjaya	Cast	Dec 21, 2007
Tejaab	Cast	Dec 19, 2007
Dewar Babu	Cast	Aug 25, 2007
Barood	Cast	Jun 18, 2007
Maya Nagara	Cast	Apr 27, 2007
Chor Sipahi	Cast	Jan 15, 2007
Hami Taxi Driver	Cast	Dec 10, 2006
Hungama	Cast	Sep 12, 2006
Manish	Cast	Sep 07, 2006
Shakti	Cast	Jul 03, 2006
Lov kush	Cast	Jun 06, 2006
Jivandata	Cast	May 21, 2006
Durga	Cast	Dec 29, 2005
Barmala	Cast	Oct 07, 2005
Manma Maya	Cast	Oct 06, 2005
Muglan	Cast	Apr 07, 2005
Dhadkan	Cast	Jan 01, 2004
Maya Namara	Cast	Jan 01, 2003

== Awards ==
Year	Award	Category	Film	Result	Ref.
2004	Dabur Anmol Motion Picture Award	Best Actor	Maya Namara	Won	
