= Meri Mamu =

Nepalese drama film

- Theatrical release poster
- Directed by: Yam Thapa
- Written by: Yam Thapa
- Produced by: Santosh Sen
- Starring: Ayub Sen; Saruk Tamrakar; Aaslesha Thakuri
- Edited by: Banish Shah; Bhupendra Adhikari
- Production company: Aasusen Films
- Distributed by: Byankates Entertainment; Budha Subba Digital
- Release date: 31 August 2018 (Nepal)
- Running time: 115 minutes
- Country: Nepal
- Language: Nepali

Meri Mamu (English: My Mother, Nepali: मेरी मामु) is a 2018 Nepalese drama film, directed and written by Yam Thapa. The film is produced by Santosh Sen, under the banner of Aasusen Films. The film stars Ayub Sen, Kusum Gurung, Saruk Tamrakar, and Aaslesha Thakuri in the lead roles.

== Plot ==
After his mother's death Prem (Ayub Sen) thinks his step mother was responsible for her death, and who makes attempts to kill her.

== Cast ==
- Ayub Sen as Prem
- Kusum Gurung as Mamata
- Saruk Tamrakar as Aakash
- Aaslesha Thakuri as Manisha

== Soundtrack ==
| No. | Title | Lyrics | Music | Singer(s) | Length |
|---|---|---|---|---|---|
| 1. | "Aama" | Rabi Malla | Kalyan Singh | Rohit John Chettri | 4:06 |
| 2. | "Kasaile Nachhoyeko" | | | | 4:50 |
