= The Sari Soldiers =

- Directed by: Julie Bridgham
- Production company: Butter Lamp Films
- Release date: 2008
- Country: Nepal

The Sari Soldiers is a 2008 documentary film about the Nepalese Civil War and it is directed by Juile Bridgham.

== Reception ==
Ronnie Scheib of Variety wrote "One of several recent docus that give credence to the old feminist saw that if women were given power, they would speedily put an end to war". Slant Magazine praised the film writing "Even at its spottiest, however, Bridgham’s overarching portrait of political upheaval is compassionate and insightful, and in courageous Devi’s quest for maternal and social justice, the director discovers a symbol of both inspirational human rights advocacy, and the terrible tragedy of tyranny".

=== Awards ===
Year	Award	Category	Result	Ref(s).
2008	Human Rights Watch Film Festival	Nestor Almendros Award	Won	
2009	One World Film Festival	Special Jury Award	Won	
