= Karishma Manandhar =

Nepalese actress

- Born: July 9,1972 As per SEE Record; Lalitpur, Nepal
- Occupations: Actress, Producer, Politician
- Years active: 1988–present

Karishma Manandhar is a Nepalese actress and producer who has predominantly worked in Nepali-language films.

Mandadhar made her acting debut at the age of 17 with the film Santaan (1988). Throughout the 1990s and early 2000s, she starred in some of the most successful Nepali films of the era, including Truck Driver (1994), Allare (1995), Basanti (2000), Maya's Bar (2012), and Phool (2012). She later became a film producer.

== Filmography ==
Year	Title	Role
1994	Truck Driver	
1999	Ek Number Ko Pakhe	
2000	Basanti	Basanti
2000	Yo Maya Ko Sagar	Priya
