= The Third Generation (2009 film) =

The Third Generation (2009) (तेस्रो पुस्ता २०६६ in Nepali) is a documentary based on a 19-year-old Nepalese boy who leaves his well paid job with the United Nations in order to continue his education in a western country. The documentary was released in Helsinki on 16 July 2009 and was written and directed by young Nepali filmmaker Manoj Bhusal. The documentary which was shot in digital HD format was made by Silver Lining Creation Finland.

== Background and Production ==
Reportedly, the documentary originally started as a short film that would portray the daily life of a foreign student in Finland, but it took a complete turn when it was discovered that the central figure of the documentary had extraordinary plans for his impoverished and war-trodden motherland.

== Reception ==
The documentary was first screened in August 2009 in Helsinki and subsequent screenings were organized in different parts of the world. The audience were reported to have described the film as 'touchy' and 'extraordinary' but had some negative remarks about technical specifications such as some clips were reported to be 'too dark' and 'shaky'.
