= Tika Bhandari =

Nepalese singer

- टिका भण्डारी
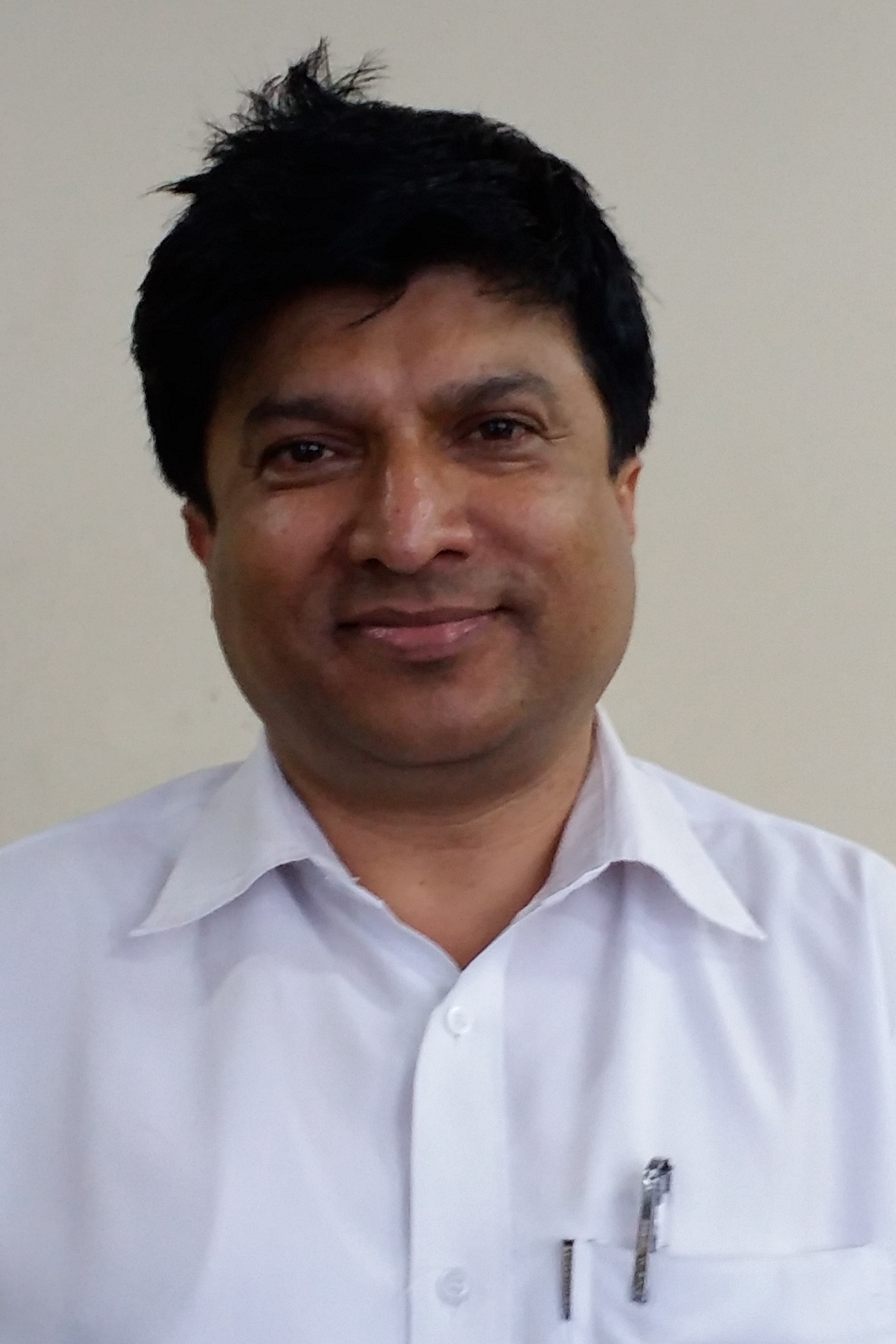
- Tika Bhandari in 2017
- Born: 1964 (age 61–62); Santinagar, Jhapa
- Education: I.A Pass
- Website: http://www.tikabhandari.com

Tika Bhandari (Nepali: टीका भण्डारी) is a Nepalese song composer and singer of Nepali music. He has composed music for over 50 Nepali modern songs and has released a total of 22 music albums. He is best known for composing songs like Goli Sishako.

He is also the Deputy Director of Radio Nepal. On 19 May 2016, he participated an environmental song by 365 Nepali artists lyrics and music by Nipesh Dhaka, in entitled Melancholy which set a Guinness World Records.

== Albums ==
He has worked with various lyricists and singers in more than 23 different musical albums and 4 dozen retail albums.

=== As a composer ===
- Pratham Bhet with various artists – 2049 BS
- Nauli with singer Rekha Sharma – 2061 BS
- Abhilekh with lyricist Yubaraj Poudel – 2061 BS
- Gantabya with lyricist Prakash Kuikel – 2063 BS
- Aadha baato with Hemanat Pardeshi- 2066 BS
- Palpal with Surya Khatri Ghayal – 2070 BS
- Madan, Dedicated to people's leader Madan Bhandari (Music Composition) – 2071 BS
- Pardesh with lyricist Gyanendra Gadal – 2006 AD
- Kunai din with lyricist Shekhar Dhungel – 2008 AD
- Abhipsha with lyricist Bhupendra Mahat – 2010 AD
- Ek anjuli maya with lyricist Deepak Jadit – 2009 AD
- Parikalpana with lyricist Chandra Parsai Bibash – 2007 AD
- Itihas with lyricist Min Bahadur Thapa – 2014 AD
- Mayako Sahar with lyricist Ishwar Prabasi – 2015 AD
- Rojai with singers Narad Dahal and Teken Dahal – 2015 AD
- Best of Tika Bhandari music collection – 2015 AD
- Desh – patriotic songs collection – 2015 AD

=== As a music director in Nepali films ===
- Madahosh – 2054 BS
- Bihani – 2055 BS
- Bahadur – 2055 BS
- Gaule – 2056 BS
- Pardeshi Kancha – 2056 BS
- Jeet – 2056 BS
- Majdur – 2057 BS
- Bhai – 2057 BS
- Lakshuman Rekha – 2057 BS
- Natedar – 2058 BS
- Pinjada – 2059 BS
- Santan Ko Maya – 2059 BS
- Jiwan Dan – 2059 BS
- Hamro Jindagi – 2059 BS
- Baksis – 2059 BS

=== As a singer ===
- Nepal Jatra Parody – 2058 BS
- Kurshi Jatra Parody – 2059 BS
- Swar Sangeet – 2015 AD
- Madan – 2015 AD
- Parody remix – 2015 AD
- Melancholy – 19 May 2016, An environmental song by 365 Nepali Artists, Guinness World Records.
