= Prakash Sayami =

Nepalese film director

- प्रकाश सायमी
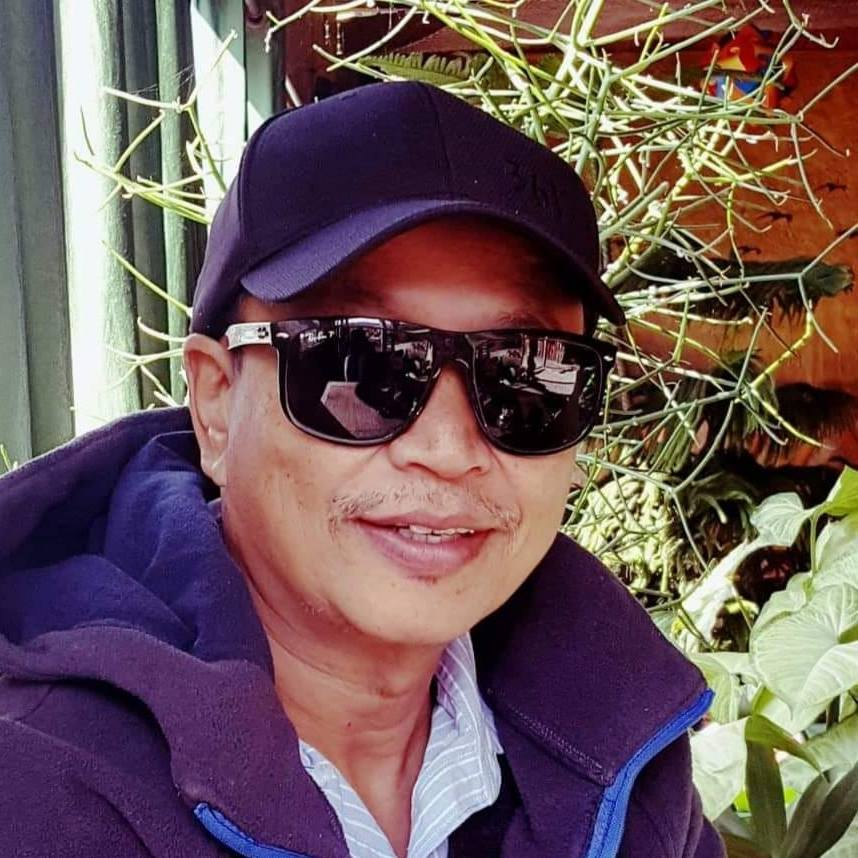
- Born: 21 March 1965 (age 60); Kathmandu, Nepal
- Occupations: director, producer, writer

Prakash Sayami (Nepali: प्रकाश सायमी )is a Nepali film director, writer and producer. He is an independent film maker and he has directed six feature-length movies. He is currently working in Ujyaalo Radio Network programme Ajar Amar Geetharu.

In 1986, he worked as an assistant director and scriptwriter on many commercial Nepali films. He made his directorial debut in 1993. In 2008, Prakash Sayami was elected as vice-president of the Music Royalty society of Nepal which aims to protect musician's copyrights nationally and internationally. Sayami studied film making in Bombay.

As a writer, he has written 11 books in Nepali and English namely Chalchitra Kala Ra Pravidi, Barshadi Dinharoo, Kathmandu Selfie, Nepali Sangeet ko Ek Shatak, Sangeet ko Swarnim Yug, Film Nirman ra Nirdeshan, Ghalib ko Chihan, Ananta Yatra Ee Salai ka kati haru, Sanskaran, Ray: the Man of Cinema (English). He also directed six Nepali and one Maithali movies- Prithivi, Simana, Avatar, Ranikhola, Zamin and Hatiyar, Hansa Chalal Pardesh (Maithali). He has recorded Nepali poems which can be found in Anjali CD Album and has brought out the collection of songs of movies called Awaj Haru.

== Directorial debut ==
Prakash Sayami made his first feature film, Prithivi, in 1994. His next film was Simana.

== Books ==
- Ananta Yatra (Poem) (Perennial Journey) (1985)
- Ray: The Man of Cinema (1997)
- Film Nirman ani Nirdesan (Film making and direction) (1997)
- Nepali Sangeet ko Swarnim Yug (Golden Age of Nepali Music) (1999)
- Sanskaran (Edition)(2003)
- Eee Salai ka katiharu (Stick of Matches) (2002)
- Chalchitra Kala ra Pravidhi (Film: Art and Technique) (1993)
- Nepali Sangeet ko Ek Satak (A century of Nepali music) (2009)
- Ghalib ko Chihan (Cemetery of Ghalib) (2011)
- Kathmandu Selfie (2012)
- Kathmandu Montage (A collection of contemporary essays) (2019)

== Interviews ==
- https://www.youtube.com/watch?v=31MULDEeMv0
