= Shrisha Karki =

Nepalese actress and model

Shreesha Karki
- Died: 13 October 2002; Kathmandu, Nepal
- Years active: 1997–2002

Shrisha Karki (Nepali: श्रीषा कार्की) was a Nepalese actress and model known for her work in Nepali cinema. She committed suicide by hanging at her home on 13 October 2002 following the publication of her nude photo on Jana Aastha National Weekly. Her death sparked debates over tabloid journalism.

== Filmography ==
Films
Year	Title	Role(s)	Notes	Ref.
1997	Yo Mayale Launa Satayo			
1997	Allare			
1998	Aafno Birano			
1998	Zameen			
1998	Anshabanda			
1998	Gham Chhaya			
2000	Maya Baiguni			
2000	Aawara			
2001	Beimani			
2001	Maya Garchhu Ma			
2001	Kaidi			
2001	Dharti			
2001	Malati			
2002	Aatankabadi			
2002	Sukha Dukha		Posthumous release	
2004	Bacha Bandhan		Posthumous release	
