= Sushil Chhetri =

Nepalese actor

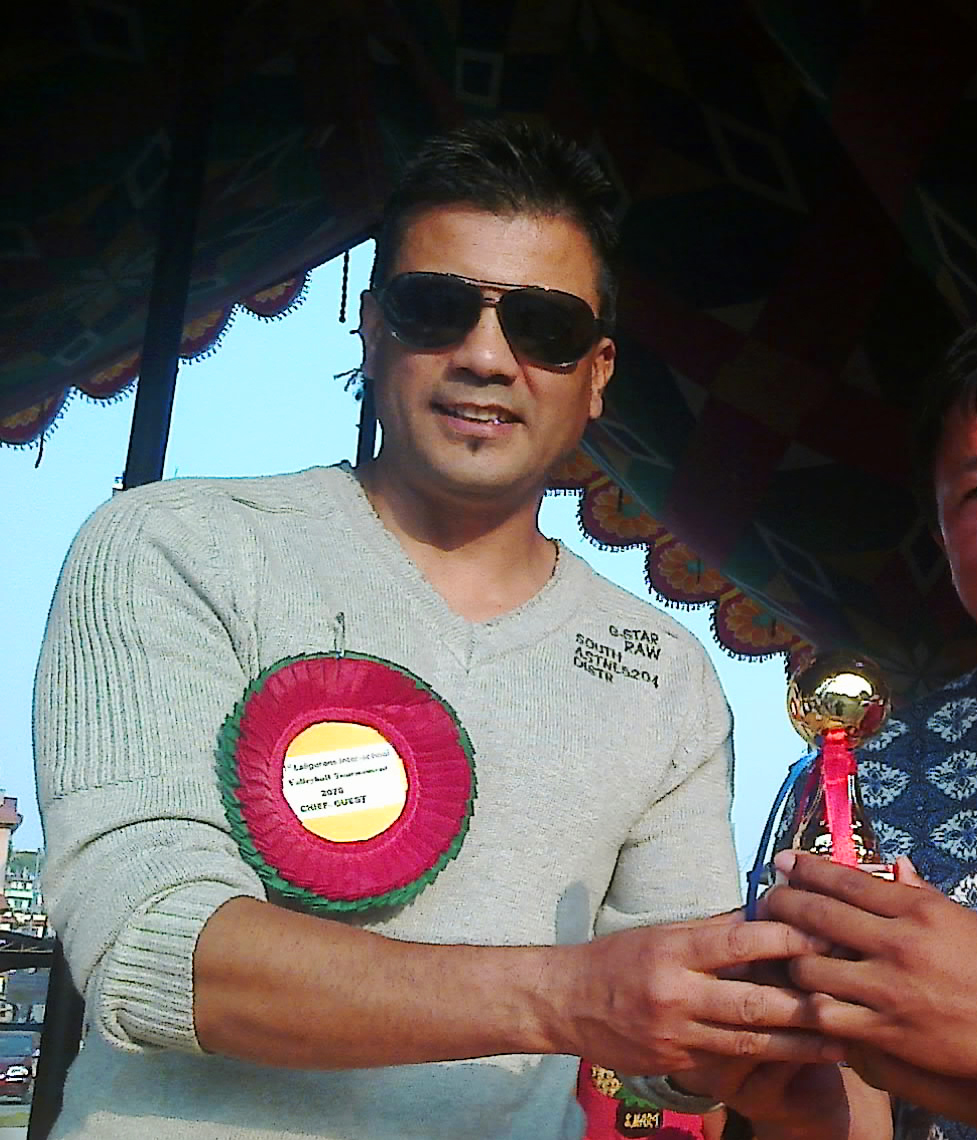
- Occupations: Actor, model
- Years active: 1999–present
- Known for: Aago (2000), Gaajal (2001), and Anjuli (2002)
- Website: Official Website

Sushil Chhetri (Nepali: सुशील क्षेत्री) is a Nepalese actor who has worked in the Nepali film industry for more than a decade. He debuted in Kollywood with the film Aago which received much hype and sensation. Because the story was based on the Maoist crisis it was banned before release. He is best known for his movies Aago (2000) and Gaajal (2001). Chhetri acted in dozens of Nepali movies and 11 Bhojpuri movies. After a sort of disappearance from the Nepali film industry, he came back with his movie Bich Bato (2015). Before entering Kollywood as an actor he started his career as background dancer. After success in his debut movie he rose to super-stardom with string of box office hits and critically acclaimed movies including Bhai (1999), Gaajal (2001), Khandan (2002), Muskaan (2002), Uphar (2003), Ke bho lau na ni (2003), Khayal khaylaiye ma (2004), Muglaan (2004), and Tribeni (2004).

== Education ==
Chhetri completed his primary education from Tika High School, Kathmandu. He further completed I Com from Tahachal Campus and studied B Com till second year from Patan Campus.

== Filmography and awards ==
Chhetri has been honoured with many prestigious awards from national and international organizations. He was one of the nominees for the categories of leading Actor in Dabur Anmol Motion Picture Award (2004) for the Nepali movie Triveni. He was also honoured with the title "Best Actor" in Kolkata for his first movie Aago in Kalakar Awards. He received the award from Bollywood actress Rani Mukherjee.

== Filmography ==
Years	Films	Co-actors
1999	Aago	Bipana Thapa, Niruta Singh
1999	Bhai	Melina Manandhar
1999	Prayash	Saroj Khanal
1999	Prem	Saroj Khanal
1999	Dhuk Dhuki	Rupa Rana
2001	Gajal	Ramesh Upreti, Bipana Thapa
2001	Khandan	Rajesh Hamal, Niruta Singh
2001	Mero Hajur	Shiva Shrestha
2002	Doman	Bipana Thapa, Dilip Rayamajhi
2002	Ananth	Bipana Thapa,
2002	Muskan	Dilip Rayamajhi, Bipana Thapa
2002	Shadayantra	Bipana Thapa
2002	Dhan Sampati	Dilip Rayamajhi, Jharna Bajracharya
2002	Sahid Gate	Bipana Thapa
2002	Anjuli	Jharna Bajracharya
2003	Khyal-Khyalaima	Dilip Rayamajhi, Bipana Thapa
2003	Ke bho lau na ni	Melina Manandhar
2003	Upahar	Niruta Singh
2003	Samarpan	-
2004	Ladai	Rajesh Hamal, Niruta Singh
2004	Triveni	Melina, Jharna Bajracharya
2004	Lekhant	Rekha Thapa
2005	Ukali Orali	Rajesh Hamal, Bipana Thapa
2005	Majhi Ma-Ma	-
2005	Sanjivani	Jharna Bajracharya
2006	Kahi Milan Kahi Bichod	Jal Shah
2006	Muglan	Dilip Rayamajhi, Jharna Thapa, Bipana Thapa
2006	Indreni	Dilip Rayamajhi, Bipana Thapa
2007	Binti Patra	-
2007	Sandesh	Biraj Bhatta, Rekha Thapa
2008	Ahankhar	-
2008	Jana Yudha	Akhash Adhikari
2009	Bish	Rajesh Hamal, Nikhil Uprety
2009	Karma ko fal	Nandita K.C.
2009	Ghamanda	-
2010	Hasi Deu Ek Phera	Madan Krishna Shrestha, Hari Bansha Acharya
2010	Tasbir	-
2010	Bhai mara	-
2010	Bhagya Bidhata	Rajesh Hamal, Nikhil Upreti
2011	Jwala mukhi	Melina Manandhar
2011	Paapi Raat	Sumina Ghimire
2011	Gunda Raj	-
2012	Didi Bhai	Rajesh Hamal
2012	Bijay Path	Nikhil Upreti
2012	Bazzi	Dilip Rayamajhi
2012	Daud	-
2013	Gangajal	Biraj Bhatta, Rekha Thapa
2013	Kawaj	Rajesh Hamal
2013	Ta ta Sarai Shaprish ni Badri	-
2014	Man paraye Maya Laye	Shree Krishna Shrestha, Jharna Thapa
2014	Samaya	Rajesh Hamal
2014	Josh	-
2014	Sapath	-
2014	Mero Maya Timi Lai	Anup Bikram Shahi
2014	Parichaya	Nikhil Upreti
2014	Kallywood	-
2015	Aago-2	-
2015	Bich Bato	-
2015	Matri Bhumi	-
2015	Mancheko Maya	-
2015	Commission	-
2016	Badshah	-
2016	Dhanwan	-
2016	Surakshya Guard	-
2016	Smokey City	-
2000	The Ring (Start Best Seller) Star Plus Channel, India	Director: Pamod Pradhan [International]
2008	Didi tor Dewar dewana (Bojhpuri, Indian)	Director: Guddu Jafrey [International]
2010	Mardh Rikshawala (Bojhpuri, Indian)	Director: Manoj Narayan [International]
2013	Sherni (Bojhpuri, Indian)	Director: Manoj Narayan [International]
2015	Chandika (Bojhpuri Indian)	Director: Manoj Narayan [International]
2026	Black City	Lead Cast

== Awards and nominations ==
Year	Organisation	Award	Work	Result	Ref
2006	Dabur Anmol Motion Picture		Triveni	Nominated	
2001	Kalakar Awards	Best Actor Award	Aago	Won	

== See also ==
- List of Nepalese actors
