= Nepal Idol =

Nepalese singing reality television series

- Logo
- Genre: Reality television
- Created by: Simon Fuller
- Based on: Idol franchise
- Directed by: Aleen Shrestha (seasons 2–3, 6, Nepal Idol Junior Season 1); Suresh Paudel (season 2–6); Lokesh Bajracharya (seasons 2–3); Laxman Paudyal (season 1)
- Country of origin: Nepal
- Original language: Nepali
- No. of seasons: 6
- No. of episodes: 207

Production
- Production location: Various
- Camera setup: Multi-camera setup (Grass Valley/Black Magic/gh4)
- Running time: 100+ minutes
- Production companies: Image TV; FremantleMedia; 19 Entertainment

Original release
- Network: AP1 TV Image TV
- Release: 12 April 2017 – present

Nepal Idol (Nepali: नेपाल आइडल) is a Nepalese reality television singing competition that is part of the Idols franchise created and owned by FremantleMedia. Nepal Idol 2017 was the first season of Idol franchise in Nepal which aired on AP1 TV. AP1 TV lost the franchise licence from Sony. Hence the future editions of Nepal Idol is uncertain. It is reported that Image TV is in talks for franchise licence to continue new seasons.

In the first season, auditions were held at seven cities; Nepalgunj, Butwal, Narayangarh, Birgunj, Biratnagar, Pokhara and Kathmandu. Contestants aged 16 to 30 years are allowed to participate. The first ever season of the show was won by Buddha Lama from Pokhara, Nepal in which a total of 93,100,000 votes were cast for the grand finale. The second season of Nepal Idol was won by Ravi Oad from Dhangadi. And, the third season of Nepal Idol was won by Sajja Chaulagain from Morang. According to organizers, more than 125,000 people watched the Grand Finale Event live on YouTube, which was a record for any Nepalese television show watched online. Nepal Idol is produced by AP1 TV for Annapurna Media Network.

In the finale event of season 3, the announcement of winner was affected due to a COVID-19 positive case from one of the production team members, which led to the finale program being withheld and announcement of the winner by digital method.

For Season 4, all past three judges got replaced by new judges, namely, Sambhujeet Baskota, Sugam Pokharel and Subani Moktan. Bhupendra Thapa Magar was winner of season 4.

For season 5, all judges of season 4 got replaced by Nhyoo Bajracharya, Indira Joshi and Kali Prasad Baskota; who returned to the show again. Karan Pariyar won the fifth season.

The sixth season was announced by AP1 TV by releasing promotional content on its social handles in January 2025, followed by a press conference on 6 March 2025.

AP1 TV officially announced the launch of Nepal Idol Junior in mid-2024, inviting young talents to apply through digital auditions via the "Aafno Digital" app. While the franchise has been under the Annapurna Media Network's umbrella for years, this specific junior edition is scheduled to air its first season in 2026. The show will be judged by a star-studded panel featuring Sugam Pokharel, Subani Moktan, and Asmita Adhikari, with Mahesh Kafle and Dr. Sareesha Shrestha confirmed as the hosts.

== Format ==
Nepal Idol also follows the format provided by Fremantle Media from Idol Bible and followed by other versions of Idol Series.

=== Hosts ===
As per the format, there is at least one or two hosts both of them being of same gender or opposite gender. Nepal Idol was hosted by television actor and model Sushil Nepal and actress, model, VJ and television journalist Reema Bishwokarma. After announcement of season 2 Sushil Nepal was replaced by versatile and talented media personality Asif Shah who is also television producer, music video and tvc director, singer and actor from famous Nepali movie, 'Dui Rupiyan'. For season 3, new host Mampi Ghosh replaced Reema Bishwokarma who moved to Comedy Champions. In 2019, Asif Shah and Mampi Ghosh, previously known as Pawankali, hosted the third season. Similarly, Mampi Ghosh got replaced by Reshma Ghimire in Season 4. Reema Bishwokarma returned once again in Season 5.

=== Judges ===
A preselected panel of music industry representatives are given to judge the contestants in prejudge round which is not televised. Actual panel of judges of three or five judge the contestants from Televised Audition to Grand Finale.

==== Season 1–3 ====
In season one, two and three the judges were Nhyoo Bajracharya, Indira Joshi and Kali Prasad Baskota. Bajracharya is a music composer and singer. He has composed dozens of famous songs in Nepali, Nepal bhasa and Hindi. His popular compositions include "Ful ko aakhaa ma fulai sanasar" with Ani Choying Drolma with his fusion style music. Indira Joshi is a singer, model, and actress. She released the song "'Rato Ghanghara" from her album Dance with Me. She has also sung the item number "Udhreko choli" from the movie Loot. She had already been among top 5 contestants in the first season of Nepali singing reality show Nepali Tara. Kali Prasad Baskota is a singer, musician, writer, and lyricist. His initial hits were the songs like "Chahana Sakiyo" and "Lappan Chappan". Kali had done his singing debut from song "Jaalma" from movie Resham Filili which was one of the biggest hit of that time. His other popular compositions includes "Thamel Baazar" from the movie Loot 2 and "Nira" from Purano Dunga movie. All three judges were replaced in Season 4 as they moved for other reality show, Saregamapa Lil Champs.

==== Season 4 ====
All three judges from last three seasons were replaced by Sambhujeet Baskota, Subani Moktan and Sugam Pokharel. Sambhujeet Baskota is a Nepali music composer who is considered to be the most popular and prolific music director of the Nepali Film Industry. He has composed over 3,000 songs, which have appeared in more than 250 films. He has composed songs for many Nepali hit films like Prem Pinda, Karodpati, Thuldai etc. Similarly, Sugam Pokharel is a Nepali popular pop singer, songwriter, RJ and music composer who is working in the Nepali music industry since 1995. In recent years, he has been also known as a popular playback singer. He became popular as a playback singer for the song Ke yo Maya ho from the movie Mero Auta Sathi Chha. Most of the Nepali people remember him for the festival song Dashain Tihar. He has given many other hit songs such as Mero Auta Sathi Chha, Mero Sansar, K yo Maya ho, Feri tyo din, etc. Likewise, Subani Moktan is a singer/songwriter and also a music arranger. Besides her own independent music, she also works as a playback singer for movies and a teacher at Kathmandu Jazz Conservatory.

==== Season 5–present ====
The three old judges Nhyoo Bajracharya, Indira Joshi and Kali Prasad Baskota returned to Nepal Idol Season 5 after a break of a season.

=== Performance stages ===
- Auditions are held in numerous places in any particular region or country that give most people (audition entry is bound by certain legal requirements such as age and citizenship for example) the chance to sing in front of musical/television producers and if successful, they advance to a recorded televised audition where the show "judges" advance up to 300 people in some countries to the next round.
- The Theatre round is where a specially selected group of auditioners from all regional auditions converge (always in the host city) to perform in three sub stages: a chorus line in groups of 10 where free song choices are allowed, a trio (or less commonly a duo or quartet) where contestants must memorize a preselected song to perform and choreograph together, and finally a solo a cappella round where contestants sing a song of their own choice without musical backing in front of friends, family, judges & fellow contestants. Each stage of the theatre round, a number of contestants are eliminated and sent home by the judges, very few contestants brought back during the Wildcards show.
- Piano Round: After theatre, top 18 or top 20 contestants are selected. They are divided into 8 or 10 within themselves and 3 or 4 are eliminated from the round. Eliminated contestants are brought back during wildcard shows.
- Gala Round: The gala occurs usually pre-recorded where contestants sing in a television studio fully televised; again judges give critiques but beginning at this stage, home viewers vote via telephone and SMS (and in some countries other voting mechanisms including via Internet) who they want to stay in the competition. The contestants are judged by 50% audience vote and 50% judges marking. Gala usually consists of 12 contestants where they perform individually or in a group (usually in elimination day) semi-final contestants sing every week until all finalists have been chosen. Wildcards episode is also featured. Judges can use veto power of no elimination for only one time.
- Grand Finale: The Grand Finale occurs when there are three contestants left in the competition. This is the pinnacle of the entire series and often highest-rated show; also for some countries, it is venued in a prestigious location. There are usually group performances and/or special musical guests. Also, it has the best moments of the series which leads up to the announcement of the winner, which is determined by the highest number of votes. When that happens, he or she will perform an encore of the coronation single which sometimes includes pyrotechnics/fireworks. In every round, the set is often changed.

== Season summary ==
Season	Year	First Aired	Last Aired	Hosts		Judges			Network	Total episodes	Winner	Runner-up	Director/s
1	2017	2017 March 31	2017 Sept 23	Sushil Nepal	Reema Bishwokarma	Nhyoo Bajracharya	Indira Joshi	Kali Prasad Baskota	AP1 TV	39	Buddha Lama	Nishan Bhattarai	Laxman Poudyal
2	2018	2018 Aug 9	2018 Dec 21	Asif Shah	Reema Bishwokarma	Nhyoo Bajracharya	Indira Joshi	Kali Prasad Baskota	AP1 TV	38	Ravi Oad	Bikram Baral	Suresh Paudel Aleen Shrestha Lokesh Bajracharya
3	2019/20	2019 Dec 19	2020 Aug 28	Asif Shah	Mampi Ghosh	Nhyoo Bajracharya	Indira Joshi	Kali Prasad Baskota	AP1 TV	36	Sajja Chaulagain	Prabin Bedwal	Suresh Paudel Aleen Shrestha Lokesh Bajracharya
4	2021/22	2021 Dec 9	2022 Mar 19	Asif Shah	Reshma Ghimire	Sambhujeet Baskota	Subani Moktan	Sugam Pokharel	AP1 TV	30	Bhupendra Thapa Magar	Namgyel Tamang	Suresh Paudel
5	2024	2024 Mar 8	2024 Jun 22	Asif Shah	Reema Bishwokarma	Nhyoo Bajracharya	Indira Joshi	Kali Prasad Baskota	AP1 TV	32	Karan Pariyar	Salome Gurung	Suresh Paudel
6	2025	2025 May 16	2025 Aug 30	Asif Shah	No 2nd Host	Nhyoo Bajracharya	Indira Joshi	Kali Prasad Baskota	AP1 TV	32	Ganga Sonam	Babita Thapa Magar	Suresh Paudel & Aleen Shrestha
7	2027	TBA	TBA	TBA	TBA	TBA	TBA	TBA	TBA	TBA	TBA	TBA	TBA

=== Nepal Idol Junior ===
Season	Year	First Aired	Last Aired	Hosts		Judges			Network	Total episodes	Winner	Runner-up	Director
1	2026	TBA	TBA	Mahesh Kafle	Dr. Sareesha Shrestha	Sugam Pokharel	Subani Moktan	Asmita Adhikari	AP1 TV	20	TBA	TBA	Aleen Shrestha

== Season 1 ==
The Project Head of the first-ever franchise singing reality show was Suresh Poudel. He is veteran in Nepali media with the background of working in popular media house in leading position for more than 25 years. The show was directed by Laxman Paudyal. Asst. directors are Manoj K.C. Samaya, Surace Dulal AKA Babu Surace D.C., Mohan Raj Adhikari. Chief Asst. director is Aleen Shrestha. Buddha Lama was the winner of the first season who also happened to be the youngest contestant to be selected.

=== Audition ===
Location	Date	Venue
Nepalgunj, Lumbini Province	**12 Magh 2073** (25 Jan 2017)	Jay Bageshowri HS School, Surkhet Road
Butwal, Lumbini Province	**15 Magh 2073** (28 Jan 2017)	Kalika HS School, Kalikanagar
Narayangarh, Bagmati Province	**18 Magh 2073** (31 Jan 2017)	Shree Balkumari HS School
Birgunj, Province No. 2	**21 Magh 2073** (3 Feb 2017)	Gyan Batika HS School, Ranighat Roads
Biratnagar, Province No. 1	**24 & 25 Magh 2073** (6 & 7 Feb 2017)	Shree Adarsha HS School, Biratnagar
Pokhara, Gandaki Province	**29 Magh & 1 Falgun 2073** (11 & 12 Feb 2017)	Navin HS School, Gairapatan
Kathmandu, Bagmati Province	**07 & 08 Falgun 2073** (18 & 19 Feb 2017)	DAV School, Jawalakhel

- **^Note 1** The dates in **bold** are written in Vikram Samvat.

=== Top 18 Performers ===
align:center;
Rank	Voting Code	Contestant	Age (on show)	Hometown	Audition city	Result
01	03	Buddha Lama	20	Pokhara	Pokhara	Winner
02	07	Nishan Bhattarai	21	Morang	Kathmandu	Runner-up
03	10	Pratap Das	22	Lalitpur	Kathmandu	3rd Place
04	13	Sagar Ale	21	Narayangarh	Narayangadh	Eliminated
05	15	Sujata Pandey	21	Butwal	Butwal	Eliminated
06	17	Suraj Thapa	30	Nepalgunj	Nepalgunj	Eliminated
07	09	Pramila Rai	22	Kathmandu	Kathmandu	Eliminated
08	18	Ulson Shrestha	25	Khotang	Kathmandu	Eliminated
09	14	Sandhya Joshi	24	Dhangadi	Kathmandu	Eliminated
10	04	Kenjal Meher Shrestha	23	Lalitpur	Kathmandu	Eliminated
11	06	Menuka Poudel	18	Jhapa	Biratnagar	Eliminated
12	12	Rahul Biswash	22	Nepalgunj	Butwal	Eliminated
13–18	02	Bidhya Tiwari	23	Hetauda	Kathmandu	Eliminated
13–18	05	Manoj Thapa Magar		Bhojpur	Biratnagar	Eliminated
13–18	01	Afsar Ali		Butwal	Butwal	Eliminated
13–18	08	Pragya Shree Biswokarma	16	Lalitpur	Kathmandu	Eliminated
13–18	16	Suraj Tamang		Morang	Biratnagar	Eliminated
13–18	11	Pratap Lama		Morang	Biratnagar	Eliminated

=== Elimination Chart ===
* Performer Of the Day	X Danger Zone	Eliminated

Date:		06/23	06/30	07/07	07/14	07/21	07/28	08/04	08/11	08/18	08/25	09/01	09/08	09/22
Place	Contestant	Result												
1	Buddha Lama							*			X	No Elimination		Winner
2	Nishan Bhattarai				X	*			*	X		No Elimination		Runner-Up
3	Pratap Das			* X			X		X		X	No Elimination		Elim
4	Sagar Ale							X		*		No Elimination	Elim	
5	Sujata Pandey				*		X		X	X	* Elim			
6	Suraj Thapa						*	X		Elim				
7	Pramila Rai					X			Elim					
8	Ulson Shrestha					X		Elim						
9	Shandhya Joshi			X	X		Elim							
10	Kenjal M. Shrestha				X	Elim								
11	Menuka Paudel			X	Elim									
12	Rahul Biswash			Elim										
13–18	Bidhya Tiwari		Elim											
13–18	Manoj Thapa Magar		Elim											
13–18	Afsar Ali		Elim											
13–18	Pragya Shree Biswokarma	Elim												
13–18	Suraj Tamang	Elim												
13–18	Pratap Lama	Elim												

- **^Note 1** The judges' save starts.
- **^Note 1** The judges' save ends.

==== Guest appearances ====
- Komal Oli (Episode 22)
- Lochan Rijal (Episode 22)
- Tulsi Ghimire (Episode 23)
- Prem Dhoj Pradhan (Episode 25)
- Rajan Ishan (Episode 25)
- Sanup Paudel (Episode 26)
- Shiva Lamichhane (Episode 26)
- Mingma Sherpa (Episode 26)
- Ciney Gurung (Episode 26)
- Yubaraj Chaulagain (Episode 26)
- Kamal Khatri (Episode 26)
- Bishwa Nepali (Episode 26)
- Kali Prasad Rijal (Episode 28)
- Pramod Kharel (Episode 30)
- Ram Krishna Dhakal (Episode 31)
- Rajesh Payal Rai (Episode 32)
- Nischal Basnet (Episode 33)
- Aasif Shah (Episode 33)
- Paul Shah (Episode 35)
- Aanchal Sharma (Episode 35)
- Hari Bansha Acharya (Finale)
- Madan Krishna Shrestha (Finale)

== Season 2 ==
It was officially announced in early 2018 that Nepal Idol will be back for another season. Season 2 auditions started from March 20 in Bhairahawa. The other announced locations were Dhangadhi, Hetauda, Dharan, Pokhara along with Kathmandu. After the auditions were concluded, the show aired from August 7. The directors for season 2 are Suresh Paudel, Aleen Shrestha and Lokesh Bajracharya. Aleen Shrestha is also the Director of Nepal's first-ever franchise dance reality show Boogie Woogie Nepal. Whereas, Lokesh Bajracharya is a well known name in visual-editing field in Nepal. The show was hosted by Asif Shah (replacing Former host Sushil Nepal) and Reema Bishwokarma. The assistant directors are Mohan Raj Adhikari and Babu Surace D.C.(Surace Dulal). Director Of Photography is Shiva Ram Shrestha.

=== Audition ===
The audition for the Second season of Nepal Idol were held on:

Location	Date	Venue
Bhairahawa, Lumbini Province	6th Chaitra 2074	Jaycees Kindergarten High School
Dharan, Province No. 1	8th Chaitra 2074	Bishnu Memorial Higher Secondary School.
Dhangadhi, Sudurpashchim Province	11th Chaitra 2074	Sudur Paschimanchal Academy
Birgunj, Province No. 2	1 Bhaisahak 2075	Shree Adarsha HS School, Birgunj
Hetauda, Bagmati Province	3rd Baisakh 2075	Siddhartha Secondary School, Hetauda 2
Pokhara, Gandaki Province	14 Baishak 2075	Shree Janapriya Secondary School, Pokhara
Kathmandu, Bagmati Province	18 & 19 Baishak 2075	NK Singh Memorial EPS School

- **^Note 1** The dates in **bold** are written in Vikram Samvat.

=== Episodes ===
Episode No	Date	Episode Title	Description
01	2018 August 9	Bhairahawa Audition	This episode featured Bhairahawa Audition.
02	2018 August 10	Dhangadi Audition	This episode featured Dhangadi Audition.
03	2018 August 16	Birgunj & Hetauda Audition	This episode featured Hetuda Audition. The contestants selected from pre-judge round in Birgunj also participated in this televised audition.
04	2018 August 17	Dharan Audition	This episode featured Dharan Audition.
05	2018 August 23	Pokhara Audition	This episode featured Pokhara Audition. Neelima Thapa Magar and Bikram Baral won golden mic in this episode.
06	2018 August 24	Kathmandu Audition	This featured Kathmandu Audition. Sumit Pathak won golden mic in this episode.
07	2018 August 30	Theatre Round - 1	Selected contestants were brought in Kathmandu for further performance. Contestants were divided into several groups and they had to perform individually.
08	2018 August 31	Theatre Round - 2	Contestants were divided into trio or duo for group performance.
09	2018 September 6	Theatre Round - 3	Individual performance with live band.
10	2018 September 7	Theatre Round - 4	Individual performance with live band.
11	2018 September 13	Piano Round - 1	Top 20 contestants were selected from Theatre Round and divided into group of 10. First ten performed in this episode.
12	2018 September 14	Piano Round - 2	Four contestants were eliminated from first group.
13	2018 September 20	Piano Round - 3	Second group performed individually.
14	2018 September 21	Piano Round - 4	Four contestants were eliminated from second group.
15	2018 September 27	Gala Round-1 Grand Premiere	Eliminated contestants performed in group. There was Grand Premiere. Top 12 contestants performed.
16	2018 September 28	Gala Round-2 Top 12 Elimination	One contestants from Top 12 was eliminated according to marks obtained by 50-50% judge-audience vote.
17	2018 October 4	Gala Round-3 Top 11	Top 11 contestants performed.
18	2018 October 5	Gala Round-4Top 11 Elimination	One contestants from Top 11 was eliminated according to marks obtained by 50-50% judge-audience vote.
19	2018 October 11	Gala Round-5 Top 10	Top 10 contestants performed.
20	2018 October 12	Gala Round-6 Top 10 Elimination	One contestants from Top 10 was eliminated.
N/A	2018 October 18	Wild Card Special Episode	Three contestants eliminated from theatre Round and three from piano Round was given second chance. Result was based on 100% audience vote.
N/A	2018 October 19	Dashain Special Episode	Revive of past episodes. Review of public, musicians and actors. Dashain greetings from contestants.
21	2018 October 25	Gala Round 7 Top 10	Top 10 finalist contestants performed. Jeshmi Limbu re entered in the show through wildcard. Sandip Chettri, Aayushman DS Joshi and Dipendra K Khanal joined.
22	2018 October 26	Gala Round 8 Top 10 Elimination	Top 10 finalist contestants performed in group. Jeshmi Limbu eliminated from the show. Top 3 contestants of Nepal Idol Season 1 appeared as guest and performed together with contestants.
23	2018 November 1	Gala Round 9 Top 9	Top 9 finalist contestants performed. Sambhujeet Baskota appeared as guest judge.
24	2018 November 2	Gala Round 10 Top 9 Elimination	Top 9 finalist contestants performed in group. Subin Singh was eliminated according to marks obtained by 50-50% judge-audience vote. Prasad team released its trailer.
25	2018 November 8	Gala Round 11 Rock/Pop Special	Top 8 finalist contestants performed. Tihar song was performed. Deepak Bajracharya appeared as guest judge. No elimination was declared.
26	2018 November 9	Gala Round 12	Top 8 finalist performed. Anuradha Koirala appeared as guest.There was no elimination. All contestants were safe.
27	2018 November 15	Gala Round 13 Nepali Folk Special	Top 8 contestants performed on folk theme.
28	2018 November 16	Gala Round 14 Top 8 Elimination	Top 8 contestants performed in duo.
29	2018 November 22	Gala Round 15 Top 7 - Idol's Idol Special	Top 7 contestants performed in duo with their singing idol.
30	2018 November 23	Gala Round 16 Top 7 Elimination	Shiva Pariyar appeared as guest.
31	2018 November 29	Gala Round 17 Top 6 - Patriotism Special	Top 6 contestants performed in national songs.
32	2018 November 30	Gala Round 18 Top 6 - Elimination	Top 6 contestants performed in duo.
33	2018 December 6	Gala Round 19 Top 5 - Audience Choice	Top 5 contestants performed. Arjun Pokhrel appeared as guest.
34	2018 December 7	Gala Round 20 Top 5 - Elimination	Top 5 contestants performed with eliminated contestants. Nir Shah and Dinesh Adhikari appeared as guest.
35	2018 December 13	Gala Round 21 Top 4	Top 4 contestants performed for Grand Finale as it was announced that Top 4 talents will go to Finale.
36	2018 December 14	Home Visit -	Finale contestants went there hometown.
37	2018 December 20	Season Preview	
38	2018 December 21	Grand Finale	

- **^Note 1** Episodes are entitled according to rounds.

=== Elimination Chart ===
** Golden Mic Winner	P Performer Of the Day	X Danger Zone	V Highest Voted Contestant

Rank	Contestant	Age	Date	09/07	09/21	09/28	10/05	10/12	10/19	10/26	11/02	11/09	11/16	11/23	11/30	12/07	12/21
Rank	Contestant	Age	Hometown	Theatre Round	Piano Round	Top 12	Top 11	Top 10	Wild Card Entry	Top 10	Top 9	No Elimination	Top 8	Top 7	Top 6	Top 5	Grand Finale
1	**Ravi Oad**	20	Dhangadi										V	P (11/22)	V		**Winner**
2	Bikram Baral	25	Pokhara	**	**					X	P V		P (11/16)	X		P(12/07) X	1st Runner Up
3	Sumit Pathak	19	Jhapa	**	**		P V						X	V	X	P(12/06) V	2nd Runner Up
4	Ashmita Adhikari	22	Jhapa					X		X		P		X	P(11/29)		3rd Runner Up
5	Amit Baral	24	Butwal				X	P			X			P (11/23)	X	Eliminated
6	Pawan Giri	22	Dolakha			P	X	V		P V	X		X		Eliminated
7	Nilima Thapa	20	Pokhara	**	**								P (11/15)	Eliminated
8	Krishal Kandel	17	Dhading					X					Eliminated
9	Subin Singh	27	Surkhet								Eliminated
10	Jeshmi Limbu	19	Itahari	Eliminated					Advanced to Top 10	Eliminated
10	Minraj Poudel	26	Chitwan	**	**	X		Eliminated
11	Heena Malla Baraili	17	Dharan			X	Eliminated
12	Ramita Sharma	22	Kathmandu			Eliminated
13-20	Bishwas Upreti	23	Jhapa		Eliminated				Participant
13-20	Dipraj Khatri	21	Makwanpur		Eliminated
13-20	Milan Pariyar	20	Morang		Eliminated				Participant
13-20	Rajendra Ale	26	Lalitpur		Eliminated				Participant
13-20	Samrat Neupane	22	Dang		Eliminated
13-20	Shrijana Karki	19	Morang		Eliminated
13-20	Suman Pariyar	18	Pokhara		Eliminated
13-20	Swastika Dhakal	21	Hetauda		Eliminated
21-30	Ravi Sharma	25	Biratnagar	Eliminated					Participant
21-30	Samikchya Dahal	20	Kathmandu	Eliminated					Participant

==== Guest appearance ====
- Hemant Sharma (Episode 11)
- Astha Raut (Episode 11)
- Suresh Adhikari (Episode 14)
- Nima Rumba (Episode 16)
- Deepak Raj Giri (Episode 17)
- Kedar Ghimire (Episode 17)
- Raju Lama (Episode 18)
- Hemant Rana Magar (Episode 19)
- Swasmita Khadka (Episode 20)
- Khagendra Lamichhane (Episode 20)
- Ashok Sharma (Episode 20)
- Sandip Chettri (Episode 21)
- Aayushman Deshraj Shrestha Joshi (Episode 21)
- Dipendra K. Khanal (Episode 22)
- Nishan Bhattarai (Episode 22)
- Pratap Das (Episode 22)
- Buddha Lama (Episode 22)
- Sambhujeet Baskota (Episode 23)
- Nischal Basnet (Episode 24)
- Dinesh Raut (Episode 24)
- Deepak Bajracharya (Episode 25)
- Anuradha Koirala (Episode 26)
- Jayananda Lama (Episode 27)
- Suraj Thapa (Episode 27)
- Deepak Jangam (Episode 28)
- Raj Sigdel (Episode 29)
- Swopnil Sharma (Episode 29)
- Tsuil Karmacharya (Episode 29)
- Tika Prasai (Episode 29)
- Santosh Lama (Episode 29)
- Rejina Rimal (Episode 29)
- Pusphan Pradhan (Episode 29)
- Shiva Pariyar (Episode 30)
- Sitaram Kattel Dhurmus (Episode 31)
- Kunjana Ghimire Suntali (Episode 31)
- Gopal Rasaili (Episode 32)
- Namrata Shrestha (Episode 32)
- Arjun Pokhrel (Episode 33)
- Neer Shah (Episode 34)
- Dinesh Adhikari (Episode 34)
- Salon Basnet (Episode 34)
- Sara Shripali (Episode 34)
- Subrat Raj Aacharya (Episode 34)

== Season 3 ==
Nepal Idol Season 3 was officially announced on July 13 by AP1 TV by uploading its promotional video on YouTube. The directors for season 3 were Suresh Paudel, Aleen Shrestha and Lokesh Bajracharya. The show was hosted by Aasif Shah and Mampi Ghosh, as the previous host Reema left the show and moved to another reality show called Comedy Champion. The associate director was Babu Surace D.C.(Surace Dulal) and the Director Of Photography was Shiva Ram Shrestha. The Reality producer was Bishal Aryal and production manager was Manish Banjara (Kaudinya).

=== Auditions ===
The audition for the Third season of Nepal Idol was held on:

Location	Date	Venue
Pokhara, Gandaki Province	31st Bhadra 2076	Janapriya Secondary School, Pokhara
Butwal, Lumbini Province	3rd Ashoj 2076	Lumbini Boarding School, Butwal
Nepalgunj, Lumbini Province	6th Ashoj 2076	Brightland College, Nepalgunj
Birgunj, Province No. 2	13th Ashoj 2076	Birgunj Institute of Technology, Brigunj
Birtamod, Province No. 1	14th Ashoj 2076	Devi Secondary School, Birtamod
Kathmandu, Bagmati Province	6th Kartik 2076	E.P.S. School, Minbhawan, Kathmandu

- **^Note 1** The dates in **bold** are written in Vikram Samvat.

=== Digital auditions ===
For the first time ever, the organizer announced Digital Auditions in which, participants can record a video and upload it into Respect & Rise App for audition purpose (due to covid situation). Selected candidates from Digital Auditions were called to Kathmandu for the Studio Rounds.

==== Airing Date ====
Official Page of Nepal Idol announced that Season 3 will be airing from 19 December 2019. This time there is a slight change in the format of the show. Host for season 2 Reema Bishwokarma was replaced by Mampi Ghosh (earlier known as Pawankali) as she moved to Nepal's first comedy reality show, 'Comedy Champions'.

=== Format ===
For this season tagline of the show is 'संगीतको शिखर' (English: The pinnacle of music) so the format has been designed so that contestants participating are climbing mountain.

=== Episodes ===
After airing wildcard special episode, due to fear of COVID-19 virus outbreak production and airing of Nepal Idol was postponed for 139 days. Nepal Idol resumed from August 6, 2020.

Episode No	Date	Round	Description
01	2019 December 19	Open Audition	The first episode featured Kathmandu Audition.
02	2019 December 20	Open Audition	The second episode featured Butwal Audition.
03	2019 December 26	Open Audition	The third episode featured Nepalgunj Audition.
04	2019 December 27	Open Audition	The fourth episode featured Birgunj Audition.
05	2020 January 2	Open Audition	The fifth episode featured Birtamod Audition.
06	2020 January 3	Open Audition	The sixth episode featured Pokhara Audition.
07	2020 January 9	Base Camp (Theater Round)	Top 30 were selected among the contestants who were selected through audition and digital auditions. Out of 30, 15 contestants performed.
08	2020 January 10	Base Camp (Theater Round)	15 leftover contestants performed. Out of 30 contestants, 17 including Golden Mike Holder were selected for Camp - IV
09	2020 January 16	Camp 4 (Piano Round)	Top 17 Contestants performed
10	2020 January 17	Camp 4 (Piano Round)	Top 17 Contestants performed, 5 contestants eliminated.
11	2020 January 23	Gala Round 1	Top 12 contestants performed.
12	2020 January 24	Gala Round 2	Top 12 contestants performed.
13	2020 January 30	Gala Round 3 Elimination 1	Top 12 contestants performed in duo.
14	2020 January 31	Gala Round 4	Top 11 contestants performed.
15	2020 February 6	Gala Round 5 Elimination 2	Top 11 contestants performed in duo.
16	2020 February 7	Gala Round 6	Top 10 contestants performed.
17	2020 February 13	Gala Round 7 Elimination 3	Top 10 contestants performed on Valentine's Special.
18	2020 February 14	Gala Round 8	Top 9 contestants performed.
19	2020 February 20	Gala Round 9 Elimination 4	Top 9 contestants performed in duo.
20	2020 February 21	Gala Round 10	Top 8 contestants performed.
21	2020 February 27	Gala Round 11 Elimination 5	Top 8 contestants performed with last season's contestants.
22	2020 February 28	Gala Round 12	Top 7 contestants performed.
23	2020 March 5	Gala Round 13 Elimination 6	Top 7 contestants performed.
24	2020 March 6	Gala Round 14 Lok Geet Special	Top 6 contestants performed in Lok Bhaka.
25	2020 March 12	Gala Round 15 Elimination 7 Idol's Idol Special	Top 6 contestants performed with their own singing idol.
26	2020 March 13	Gala Round 16	Top 5 contestants performed.
27	2020 March 19	Gala Round 17 Elimination 8	Top 5 contestants performed.
28	2020 March 20	Wildcard Entry	5 Contestant performed to compete for wildcard entry
29	2020 August 6	Wildcard Results	Kiran K Bhujel re-entered show as wildcard contestant.
30	2020 August 7	Gala Round 18	Top 5 performed.
31	2020 August 13	Gala Round 19 Elimination 9	Neshon Pun Magar Eliminated
32	2020 August 14	Gala Round 20	Top 4 performed
33	2020 August 21	Gala Round 21 Elimination 10	Kevin Glan Tamang Eliminated
34	2020 August 22	Gala Round 22 SEMI FINAL	Finale Performance form Top 3
35	2020 August 27	Season Preview	Journey of Top 3
36	2020 August 28	GRAND FINALE	Winner: Sajja Chajlagain 1st Runner Up: Pravin Bedwal 2nd Runner Up: Kiran Kumar Bhujel

==== Special Episodes ====
Episode No	Date	Episode Title	Description
1	**2020 May 18**	Arthur Gunn Special	Special episode to celebrate Arthur Gunn's success as runner-up in American Idol.
2	**2020 June 18**	Lockdown Special	Special episode as airing of Nepal Idol was discontinued due to fear of COVID-19 outbreak. Special music video featuring contestants of last season was premiered.

=== Elimination Chart ===
Danger Zone	Eliminated	Golden Mic Winner	Safe	Highest Voted	Wildcard Winner

		Top 20	Top 17	Top 12	Top 11	Top 10	Top 9	Top 8	Top 7	Top 6	Top 5	Wild Card	Top 5	Top 4	Grand Finale
Place	Contestant	Result													
1	Sajja Chaulagain											Immune			Winner
2	Pravin Bedwal											Immune			1st Runner Up
3	Kiran K Bhujel								Eliminated	Didn't Perform		Selected			2nd Runner Up
4	Kevin Glan Tamang											Immune		Eliminated	
5	Neshan Pun Magar											Immune	Eliminated		
6	Megha Shrestha										Eliminated	Performed			
7	Muskan Ranabhat									Eliminated		Didn't Perform			
8	Rachana Rimal							Eliminated				Performed			
9	Mamata Gurung						Eliminated					Performed			
10	Mingma Lama					Eliminated						Performed			
11	Kamal Sob				Eliminated										
12	Swostika Dhakal			Eliminated											
13-17	Jaljala Pariyar		Eliminated												
13-17	Kamal Deep		Eliminated												
13-17	Ranjeet Nepali		Eliminated												
13-17	Samiksha Dahal		Eliminated												
13-17	Sarita Adhikari		Eliminated												

==== Guest appearance ====
- Najjir Husain (Episode 4)
- James Pradhan (Episode 11 & 12)
- Milan Newar (Episode 13)
- Herchulus Basnet (Episode 14)
- Kunti Moktan (Episode 15)
- Shila Bahadur Moktan (Episode 15)
- Basanta Sapkota (Episode 16)
- Uday Sotang (Episode 17)
- Malina Sotang (Episode 17)
- Abahya Subba (Episode 18)
- Karna Das (Episode 19)
- Devika Bandana (Episode 20)
- Buddha Lama (Episode 21)
- Nishan Bhattarai (Episode 21)
- Pratap Das (Episode 21)
- Ravi Oad (Episode 21)
- Bikram Baral (Episode 21)
- Sumit Pathak (Episode 21)
- Asmita Adhikari (Episode 21)
- Amit Baral (Episode 21)
- Pawan Giri (Episode 21)
- Mukti Shakya (Episode 22)
- Anushka Shrestha (Episode 23)
- Rose Lama (Episode 23)
- Meera Rana (Episode 24)
- Swopnil Sharma (Episode 25)
- Manish Dhakal (Episode 25)
- Dharmendra Shewan (Episode 25)
- Samriddhi Rai (Episode 25)
- Rohit Jung Chettri (Episode 25)
- Mahesh Kafle (Episode 25)
- Meena Niroula (Episode 26)
- Prakash Sayami (Episode 27)
- Biplap Pratik (Episode 28)

==== Golden Microphone Winner ====
- Megha Shrestha (Episode 1)

== Season 4 ==
AP1 TV confirmed season 4 by publishing promo released on July 21, 2021. Since judges from last 3 season were hired by another reality show SaReGaMaPa Lil'l Champs Nepal, Nepal Idol have new faces for this season. Digital Audition was started from August 17. The directors for season 4 were Suresh Paudel,. The show was hosted by Aasif Shah and Reshma Ghimire. The assistant director was Mohan Raj Adhikari.

=== List of New Judges and Hosts ===
AP1 TV organized Press Meet on August 20, 2021, in its office to announce new judges and host for Nepal Idol Season 4. Following are new judges for Nepal Idol.

SN	Name	Titles	Known For
1	Sambhujeet Baskota	Judge	Sambhujeet Baskota is a Nepali music composer. He is considered to be the most popular and prolific music director of the Nepali Film Industry. He has composed over 3,000 songs that have appeared in more than 250 films.
2	Sugam Pokharel	Judge	Sugam Pokharel (Nepali:सुगम पाेखरेल) is a Nepalese pop singer, music composer, songwriter and radio jockey. His first solo recording, Mero Sansaar (2001), became a top seller in Nepal.
3	Subani Moktan	Judge	Subani Moktan is a singer, songwriter and music arranger. She also works as a playback singer for movies. She is a teacher at Kathmandu Jazz Conservatory. She is daughter of Kunti Moktan, a popular singer.
4	Asif Shah	Host	Asif Shah is a Nepali presenter, actor, director, producer and singer who has host Nepal Idol Season 2 and 3 earlier too.
5	Reshma Ghimire	Host	Reshma Ghimire is a Nepali model, and actress who was first-ever verified Nepali TikTok User. She is known for playing Nepali music videos. She is one of the most loved and followed TikTok and Instagram celebrity in Nepal and also a winner of Miss Purbeli 2014.

=== Digital Audition ===
Due to COVID-19 and no permissions granted for physical audition, the production company announced Digital Auditions starting from August 17 for a month through APON App, an OTT platform developed by Annapurna Media Network.

=== Physical Audition ===
Few of the selected participants from digital auditions will be called for physical audition in various cities which includes Biratnagar, Nepalgunj, Pokhara and Kathmandu.

Date (AD)	Date (BS)	Province	Cities
26 Sept 2021	10 Ashoj 2078	Province No. 1	Biratnagar
2 Oct 2021	16 Ashoj 2078	Lumbini Province	Nepalgunj
7 Oct 2021	21 Ashoj 2078	Gandaki Province	Pokhara
9 & 10 Nov 2021	23 & 24 Kartik 2078	Bagmati Province	Kathmandu

=== Broadcast Date ===
AP1 TV announced on air date by publishing promo video. Fourth season of show starts from December 9.

=== Theatre Round ===
Selected participants from Physical Audition (Open Audition) would be kept in closed camp and Theatre Rounds will be conducted.

=== List of Episodes ===
Episode No	Date	Round	Description
01	2021 December 9	Grand Premiere	First episode of Season 4, new judges were introduced.
02	2021 December 10	Biratnagar Audition	The second episode featured Biratnagar Audition.
03	2021 December 16	Nepalgunj Audition	The third episode featured Nepalgunj Audition.
04	2021 December 17	Pokhara Audition	The fourth episode featured Pokhara Audition. Raj Kumar Pariyar wind first golden mic.
05	2021 December 23	Kathmandu Audition I	The fifth episode featured Kathmandu Audition. Madan Gurung won golden mic.
06	2021 December 24	Kathmandu Audition II	The sixth episode featured Pokhara Audition.
07	2021 December 29	Theatre Round	Hundreds of selected participants performed in group.
08	2021 December 24	Theatre Round	Top 30 selected.
09	2022 January 6	Piano Round	Top 30 contestants performed solo.
10	2022 January 7	Piano Round	Top 12 selected.
11	2022 January 13	Gala Round I	Top 12 contestants performed.
12	2022 January 14	Gala Round I	Sajja Chaulagain appeared as guest and remaining contestants performed.
13	2022 January 20	Gala Round II	Ananda Raj Karki appeared as guest and Sangeet Poudel eliminated from the show.
14	2022 January 21	Gala Round II	Alok Shree appeared as guest and Top 11 contestants performed.
15	2022 January 27	Gala Round III	Dhiraj Rai appeared as guest and Madan Gurung eliminated from the show.
16	2022 January 28	Gala Round III	Sanup Paudel and Sushant KC appeared as guest and Top 10 contestants performed.
17	2022 February 3	Nepali Movie Song Special	Saroj Khanal appeared as guest.
18	2022 February 4	Nepali Movie Song Special	Paul Shah appeared as guest.
19	2022 February 10	Lok Geet Special	Singer Basanta Thapa and Comedian Vickey Agrawal appeared as guest.
20	2022 February 11	Lok Geet Special	Shree Shanti Pariyar appeared as guests.
21	2022 February 17	Wild Card Special	Legends Kunti Moktan and Sila Bhadur Moktan appeared as guests.
22	2022 February 18	Wild Card Special	Pushpan Pradhan and Amit Baral appeared as guests.
23	2022 February 24	Elimination Day	Kamal Khatri and Bharatmani Poudel appeared as guests.
24	2022 February 25	Patriotic Special	Karna Das appeared as guest.
25	2022 March 3	Mahajodi Special	Mahajodi appeared as guests.
26	2022 March 4	Performance Day	Bhupendra Khadka appeared as guest.
27	2022 March 10	Best Performance Day	Contestant sang with previous season contestants.
28	2022 March 10	Semi Final	Cast of Chiso Astrey appeared for promotion. Capt. Rameshwor Thapa appeared to announce the winning prize amount.
29	2022 March 17	Home Visit	Show featured home visit of contestants and Holi Special
30	2022 March 19	Grand Finale	TBA

=== Elimination Chart ===
Safe	Eliminated	Didn't Perform	Wildcard Entry

Place	Contestant	Hometown	Results								
Place	Contestant	Hometown	Week 1	Week 2	Week 3	Week 4	Week 5	Week 6	Week 7	Week 8	Grand Finale
Place	Contestant	Hometown	Top 12	Top 11	Top 10	Top 9	Top 8	Top 7	Top 6	Top 5	Grand Finale
1	Bhupendra Thapa	Bhairahawa	Safe	Safe	Safe	Safe	Safe	Safe	Safe	Safe	Winner
2	Namgyel Tamang	Jhapa	Safe	Safe	Safe	Safe	Safe	Safe	Safe	Safe	First Runner Up
3	Ranjeet Nepali	Ramechaap	Safe	Safe	Safe	Safe	Safe	Safe	Safe	Safe	Second Runner Up
4	Biswas Upreti	Jhapa	Safe	Safe	Safe	Safe	Safe	Safe	Safe	Safe	Consolation
5	Laxmi Poudel	Morang	Safe	Safe	Safe	Safe	Safe	Safe	Safe	Safe	Consolation
6	Sumain Pakhrin	Hetuda	Safe	Safe	Safe	Safe	Safe	Safe	Safe	Eliminated	
7	Benisha Poudel	Jhapa	Safe	Safe	Safe	Safe	Safe	Safe	Eliminated		
8	Kanden Limbu	Terhathum	Didn't Perform	Didn't Perform	Didn't Perform	Didn't Perform	Wildcard Entry	Eliminated			
9	Aadesh Poudel	Jhapa	Safe	Safe	Safe	Safe	Eliminated				
10	Suresh Lama	Chitwan	Safe	Safe	Safe	Eliminated					
11	Rajkumar Pariyar	Parbat	Safe	Safe	Eliminated						
12	Madan Gurung	Gorkha	Safe	Eliminated							
13	Sangeet Poudel	Gulmi	Eliminated								

==== Golden Microphone Winners ====
- Rajkumar Pariyar (Episode 4)
- Madan Gurung (Episode 5)

==== Guest appearance ====
- Sajja Chaulagain (Episode 12)
- Ananda Raj Karki (Episode 13)
- Alok Shree (Episode 14)
- Dhiraj Rai (Episode 15)
- Sanup Paudel (Episode 16)
- Sushant KC (Episode 16)
- Saroj Khanal (Episode 17)
- Paul Shah (Episode 18)
- Basanta Thapa (Episode 19)
- Vickey Agrawal (Episode 19)
- Shanti Shree Pariyar (Episode 20)
- Kunti Moktan (Episode 21)
- Sila Bahadur Moktan (Episode 21)
- Pusphan Pradhan (Episode 22)
- Amit Baral (Episode 22)
- Kamal Khatri (Episode 23)
- Bharatmani Paudel (Episode 23)
- Karna Das (Episode 24)
- Hari Bansha Acharya (Episode 25)
- Madan Krishna Shrestha (Episode 25)
- Bhupendra Khadka (Episode 26)
- Pratap Das (Episode 27)
- Nishan Bhattarai (Episode 27)
- Asmita Adhikari (Episode 27)
- Bikram Baral (Episode 27)
- Pawan Thapa (Episode 27)
- Prabin Bedwal (Episode 27)
- Bhuwan KC (Episode 28)
- Ajar Jangam (Episode 28)
- Divya Dev (Episode 28)
- Shristi Shrestha (Episode 28)
- Capt. Rameshwor Thapa (Episode 28)

== Season 5 ==
The fifth season of Nepal Idol was confirmed by AP1TV by publishing announcement video in its digital platform. The show was directed by suresh Paudyal.Chief Asst. director is Mohan Raj Adhikari and Asst. director is Nimesh Rajbag.This time there shall be auditions in 8 cities of Nepal starting from Birtamod, Jhapa and ending in Kathmandu. The auditions will be held on:

- Birtamod (Koshi Pradesh)
- Bardibas (Madesh Pradesh)
- Hetauda (Bagmati Pradesh)
- Attariya (Sudurpachim Pradesh)
- Surkhet (Karnali Pradesh)
- Dang (Lumbini Pradesh)
- Pokhara (Gandaki Pradesh)
- Kathmandu (Nepal's Capital City)

The season will be premiered on March 8, 2024 as confirmed by organizers. Prabhu Pay has partnered Nepal Idol Season 5 as Digital Voting Partner and Vivo Nepal partnered with Nepal Idol as a title sponsor. Likewise, Redbull Nepal as Energized By partner.

=== Judges ===
In Season 5 past judges Kali Prasad Baskota, Nhyoo Bajracharya and Indira Joshi returned to Nepal Idol once again. Also Reema Bishwakarama was back as a host once again along with Asif Shah. This was announced through promo video published by AP1 TV.

=== List of Episodes ===
There shall be total of 32 episodes, eight episodes showing Open Audition, two Theater Round episodes, Four Piano round episodes and remaining Gala Rounds including Wild Card and Grand Finale. The runtime of this season would be 120 minutes per episodes.

Episode No	Air Date	Round	Episode Title
1	2024 March 8	Open Audition	Birtamod Audition
2	2024 March 9	Open Audition	Bardibas & Hetauda Audition
3	2024 March 15	Open Audition	Attariya Audition
4	2024 March 16	Open Audition	Surkhet & Dang Audition
5	2024 March 22	Open Audition	Pokhara Audition
6	2024 March 23	Open Audition	Kathmandu Audition
7	2024 March 29	Theatre Round	Theatre Round 1
8	2024 March 30	Theatre Round	Theatre Round 2
9	2024 April 5	Piano Round	Piano Round 1
10	2024 April 6	Piano Round	Piano Round 2
11	2024 April 12	Gala Round	Top 16 Performance
12	2024 April 13	Gala Round	Top 16 Performance
13	2024 April 19	Gala Round	Top 16 Elimination
14	2024 April 20	Gala Round	Top 14 Duet Performance
15	2024 April 26	Gala Round	Top 14 Elimination
16	2024 April 27	Gala Round	Top 12 Performance
17	2024 May 3	Gala Round	Top 12 Elimination
18	2024 May 4	Gala Round	Top 10 Performance
19	2024 May 10	Gala Round	Top 10 Elimination
20	2024 May 11	Gala Round	Top 9 Performance
21	2024 May 17	Gala Round	Top 9 Narayan Gopal Special
22	2024 May 18	Gala Round	Top 8 Film Special
23	2024 May 24	Gala Round	Top 8 Idol Reunion
24	2024 May 25	Gala Round	Top 7 Pop Special
25	2024 May 31	Gala Round	Top 7 Rastriya Prem Special
26	2024 June 1	Gala Round	Top 6 Bhaktaraj Aacharya Special
27	2024 June 7	Gala Round	Top 6 Judge Special
28	2024 June 8	Gala Round	Top 5 Contestant's Special
29	2024 June 14	Gala Round	Top 5 Celebrities Special
30	2024 June 15	Gala Round	Top 4 Performance for Finale
31	2024 June 21	Gala Round	Home Visit Special Episode
32	2024 June 22	Gala Round	Grand Finale

=== Guests Appearances ===
- Swar Band: Swapnil Sharma, Rohit Shakya, Gautam Tandukar (Episode 16)
- Jhuma Limbu (Episode 19)
- Prakash Sayami & Ram Krishna Dhakal (Episode 21)
- Hercules Basnet (Episode 22)
- Menuka Poudel, Amit Baral, Kiran Bhujel, Mamata Gurung, Pratap Das, Sajja Chaulagain, Pawan Giri, Muskaan Ranabhat, Nishan Bhattarai (Episode 23)
- Om Bikram Bista (Episode 24)
- Viplob Pratik and [De Captain Beyonce Famacy: Cover- Phulbutte Sari] (Episode 25)
- Satya Raj Acharya and Swaroop Raj Acharya (Episode 26)
- Shiva Pariyar (Episode 27)
- Pushpan Pradhan (Episode 28)
- Neetesh Jung Kunwar, Deepak Limbu, Samriddhi Rai, Mingma Sherpa and Tika Prasain (Episode 29)
- Gopal Rasaily and Sanjeev Baraili (Episode 30)

=== Golden Mic Winners ===
- Prerana BC (Episode 3)
- Prakash Buda (Episode 4)
- Santosh Pun (Episode 5)
- Rahul Biswash (Episode 6)
- Karan Pariyar (Episode 6)

=== Elimination Chart ===
Index	Safe	Eliminated

Place	Contestant	Hometown	Results									
Place	Contestant	Hometown	Week 1	Week 2	Week 3	Week 4	Week 5	Week 6	Week 7	Week 8	Week 9	Week 10
Place	Contestant	Hometown	Top 16	Top 14	Top 12	Top 10	Top 9	Top 8	Top 7	Top 6	Top 5	Grand Finale
1	Karan Pariyar	Bardiya										Winner
2	Salome Gurung	Kaski										1st- RU
3	Sachin Bishwokarma	Darjeeling										2nd- RU
4	Mohit Bhujel	Darjeeling										4th place
5	Manav Pariyar	Kaski										
6	Prakash Budha	Dang										
7	Isha Subedi	Jhapa										
8	Prashant Thapa	Kathmandu										
9	Sunil Bishwokarma	Pokhara										
10	Prena Bishowkarma	Kanchanpur										
12	Santosh Poon	Kaski										
12	Chhiring Pakhrin	Parsa										
14	Rishav Panthi	Kapilvastu										
14	Sunil Basyal	Surkhet										
16	Rahul Bishwash	Kathmandu										
16	Sashang Lama	Kathmandu										

== Season 6 ==
The sixth season of Nepal Idol was confirmed by AP1TV by publishing announcement video in its digital platform. The auditions was held on:

- Itahari
- Pokhara
- Nepalgunj
- Kathmandu (Nepal's Capital City)

Selected participants from Pre-Judge Audition were brought to Kathmandu for Judge Audition where participants performed with backup band in front of judge for further rounds. The Judge Audition was shot on Royal Tulip Hotel which is the venue partner for Nepal Idol.

=== Elimination Chart ===
In season 6, out of Top 16 participants, the top 8 will be considered safe. After that, the remaining 8 will fall into the danger zone and ask for votes. Based on the voting results, every week, 2 contestants will be eliminated until the top 10 is reached, and after the top 10, 1 contestant will be eliminated each week from the Nepal Idol stage. All contestants after Top 10 will ask for votes.

Index	Safe	Danger Zone	Eliminated

Place	Contestant	Hometown	Results									
Place	Contestant	Hometown	Week 1	Week 2	Week 3	Week 4	Week 5	Week 6	Week 7	Week 8	Week 9	Week 10
Place	Contestant	Hometown	Top 16	Top 14	Top 12	Top 11	Top 10	Top 9	Top 8	Top 7	Top 6	Top 5
1	Ganga Sonam	Sindhupalchowk	Safe	Safe	Danger Zone	Safe	Safe	Safe	Safe	Safe	Danger Zone	Winner
2	Babita Thapa Magar	Sikkim	Safe	Safe	Safe	Safe	Safe	Safe	Safe	Danger Zone	Danger Zone	1st Runner-up
3	Darshana Gandhari	Chitwan	Safe	Danger Zone	Safe	Danger Zone	Safe	Danger Zone	Safe	Safe	Safe	2nd Runner-up
4	Abhinaya Khati	Darjeeling	Danger Zone	Safe	Safe	Safe	Safe	Safe	Danger Zone	Safe	Safe	Consolation
5	Mirnal Manandhar	Kathmandu	Safe	Safe	Danger Zone	Safe	Safe	Safe	Safe	Danger Zone	Safe	Consolation
6	Milan Bishwokarma	Sikkim	Danger Zone	Safe	Safe	Safe	Danger Zone	Danger Zone	Danger Zone	Safe	Eliminated	
7	Jitendra Gurung	Gorkha	Safe	Danger Zone	Safe	Safe	Danger Zone	Safe	Safe	Eliminated		
8	Niraj Bishwokarma	Doti	Safe	Safe	Safe	Safe	Safe	Safe	Eliminated			
9	Pittu Gahatraj	Bara	Safe	Safe	Safe	Danger Zone	Safe	Eliminated				
10	Raj Sayami	Chitwan	Safe	Safe	Safe	Safe	Eliminated					
11	Prashanna Dhamala	Lalitpur	Safe	Danger Zone	Safe	Eliminated						
12	Maheshwar Bhattarai	Kathmandu	Safe	Safe	Eliminated							
14	Niten Moktang	Itahari	Safe	Eliminated								
14	Sushmita Erget	Siliguri	Danger Zone	Eliminated								
16	Rijan Thapa	Itahari	Eliminated									
16	Aasha Rai	Pokhara	Eliminated									

== Nepal Idol Junior ==
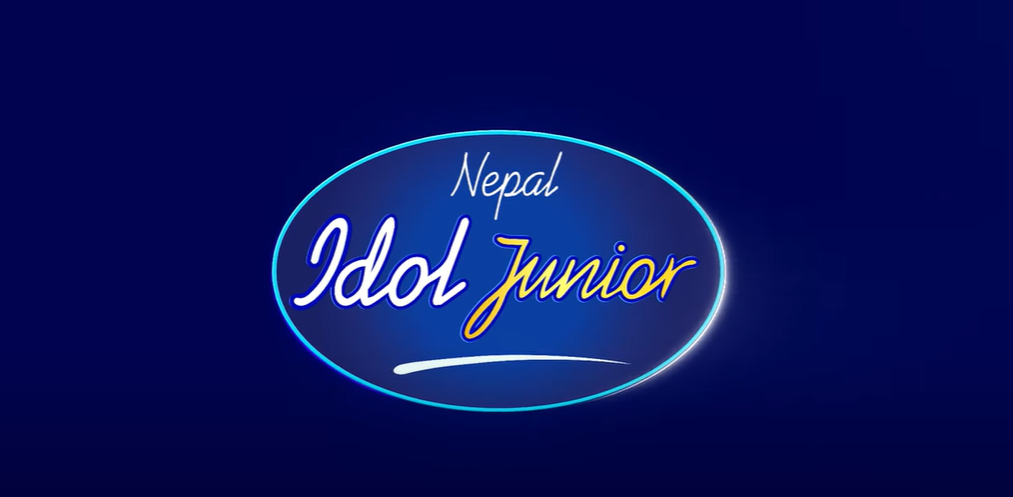
Nepal Idol Junior Logo announced by AP1 TV

On June 7, Vice Chairperson of Annapurna Media Network announced that, AP1 is bringing Nepal Idol Junior, a spinoff kids version of singing reality show after the completion of Nepal Idol Season 5. The logo was announced on July 17, 2024. The digital auditions starting on Afno Digital App. Due to less number of audition received by the organizers, the program has been postponed until further notice. The digital auditions has been resumed once again with plan of broadcast by March 2026 before seventh season of Nepal Idol.

== Controversy and lawsuit ==
On 1 September 2017, the judges of the content announced that they would use their "veto" and not allow the elimination of any contestant at the end of that episode. The hosts announced that the votes received for that episode would be added to the next weeks elimination scores. However, the move drew considerable criticism on social media, with many accusing the producers of trying to make more money or trying to save their "favourite" contestant. After that they had to face a lawsuit against them.

A lawsuit was also subsequently filed by a local lawyer against Nepal Idol and the channel broadcasting the show, in which the plaintiff claimed that the judges did not allow the elimination to save their "favorite" contestant and not disclosing the result of the vote. This lawsuit was dismissed by the court, finding that the plaintiff did not have "sufficient grounds for their claim".
