= Dui Rupaiyan =

Dui Rupaiya
- Official poster featuring Nischal Basnet
- Nepali: २ रुपैयाँ
- Directed by: Asim Shah
- Screenplay by: Asif Shah, Asim Shah, Bijaya Adhikari
- Produced by: Asif Shah, Asim Shah, Nischal Basnet
- Starring: Nischal Basnet; Asif Shah; Rabindra Jha; Buddhi Tamang; Menuka Pradhan; Swastima Khadka; Bisharad Basnet; Rajan Ishan; Prateek Raj Neupane
- Music by: Songs: Rajan Raj Shiwakoti; Roshan Thapa; Background Scores: Shailesh Shrestha; Rohit Shakya
- Release date: 8 November 2017 (Nepal)
- Running time: 138 minutes
- Country: Nepal
- Language: Nepali

Dui Rupaiyan (Nepali: २ रुपैयाँ, lit. 'Two rupees'), is a Nepali comedy, action and drama film, directed by Asim Shah. The song of the movie Kutu Ma Kutu is also the most famous and viewed Nepali song on YouTube, with more than 200 million views.

== Plot ==
This movie revolves around two friends, Jureli (Nischal Basnet) and Dari (Asif Shah), who smuggle gold illegally from India to Nepal. Their boss (Tika Pahari), and his brutal assistant Judde (Prateek Raj Neupane) gives them a Nepali two rupees note aka dui rupaiyaa. The serial number of the dui rupaiyaa is sent to the Indian party. One day while on their mission to smuggle, they stop by a restaurant which is owned by the ASP {Assistant Superintendent of Police} of the region. There Dari flirts with the ASP's wife, Maya (Menuka Pradhan), but is interrupted by her son. To make him go away Dari gave him the dui rupaiyaa note given by their boss. Problems arise for Maya and Dari when Maya's husband the ASP (Buddhi Tamang) arrives, and Dari gets chased by him. However, Jureli manages to save him in the nick of time.

When they reach near the Indo-Nepali border Dari realises that he forgot the dui rupaiyaa note at Maya's hotel. Without the note the Indian party refuse to give the gold package and give both of them a day to find and bring the note to them. The next day Dari visits Maya where he came to know that the ASP has taken his phone and Maya doesn't want him in her life anymore. In order to get his phone back Dari and Jureli follow the ASI into a fun fair, where they both along with the ASP dance and flirt with the main dancer (Swastima Khadka). On coming out of the fair the ASP opens the phone and finds out that Dari is Maya's lover, due to which a fight ensues between the two. This time too Jureli manages to saved Dari. Later that night Maya reveals that she was in a relationship with Dari, but was forced to marry the ASP for the sake of her father.

Dari and Jureli search for the note in the market but to no avail. So they decide to take help from Jhimrik Dai (Rajan Ishan), a local goon of the region who trades peoples body parts illegally. However, they can't find the note, so Jhimrik decides to trade their body parts. He forces both of them to eat laddu, a local sweet, contaminated with an intoxicating drug. On the other hand, the ASP has made a sketch of Dari and threatens Maya that he won't spare Dari. Now, both Dari and Jureli are taken by Mandal, Ambulance wala (Rabindra Jha), whose Ambulance Jureli and Dari use for the smuggling so no one would suspect them and who also helps Jhimrik trade the organs through his ambulance. After being saved by Mandal, the duo reveal the whole story to Mandal, who then is revealed to have cooperated with Jhimrik.

On Jhimrik's command they call the Indian party only for it to be revealed that they want to kill the duo and take the whole gold package for themselves. Since they lost the dui rupiyaa their lives are saved. A hilarious fight ensues between Jhimrik's gang, the Indian party, Dari and Jureli and their boss. The duo manage to escape in Mandal's ambulance and the rest are arrested by the ASP. After dropping Mandal to hospital (who got shot in his bum), Dari found two pieces of gold in the ambulance seat, which Jureli had thrown in anger before the flight. The ASP, on the other hand praises himself and his team for catching the criminals (i.e. Jureli and Dari's boss's gang and Jhimrik's gang) and giving all the credit to Maya.

The movie ends with the ASP's son revealing that he didn't spend the dui rupaiyaa and all that he did, was to get his own back on Dari for flirting with his mom. Jureli and Dari celebrate as now they are going to be billionaires.

== Cast ==
- Nischal Basnet as Jureli
- Asif Shah as Dari
- Rabindra Jha as Parmashower Prasad Mandal
- Rajan Ishan as Jhimrik Dai
- Menuka Pradhan as Maya Tamang
- Buddhi Tamang as ASP Bom Bahadur Tamang
- Swastima Khadka as Dancer in the song kutu ma kutu
- Bisharad Basnet as Bada Bihari
- Pateek Raj Neupane as Judde
- Tika Pahari as Dari and Jureli's boss

== Soundtrack ==
Kutu Ma Kutu is the most viewed Nepali song on YouTube surpassing Surke Thaili Khai.

No.	Title	Singer(s)	Length
1.	"Dui Rupaiyan"	Laure, Rohit Shakya, Aidray	4:09
2.	"Kutu Ma Kutu"	Rajan Raj Shiwakoti, Melina Rai, Rajan Ishan	5:54
3.	"Talkyo Jawani"	Asif Shah, Nischal Basnet, Meena Niroula	4:17
4.	"Kinara"	Biraj Gautam	2:30

== Awards ==
Year	Award	Category	Recipient(s)	Result	Ref(s)
2018	Kamana Film Awards	Best Actor in a Comic Role	Buddhi Tamang	Nominated	
2018	Kamana Film Awards	Best Music Director	Rajan Raj Shiwakoti	Nominated	
2018	Kamana Film Awards	Best Playback Singer (Female)	Melina Rai for "Kutu Ma Kutu"	Nominated	
2018	Kamana Film Awards	Best Choreographer	Kabiraj Gahatraj	Won	
