= Asim Shah =

Nepali politician and filmmaker (born 1982)

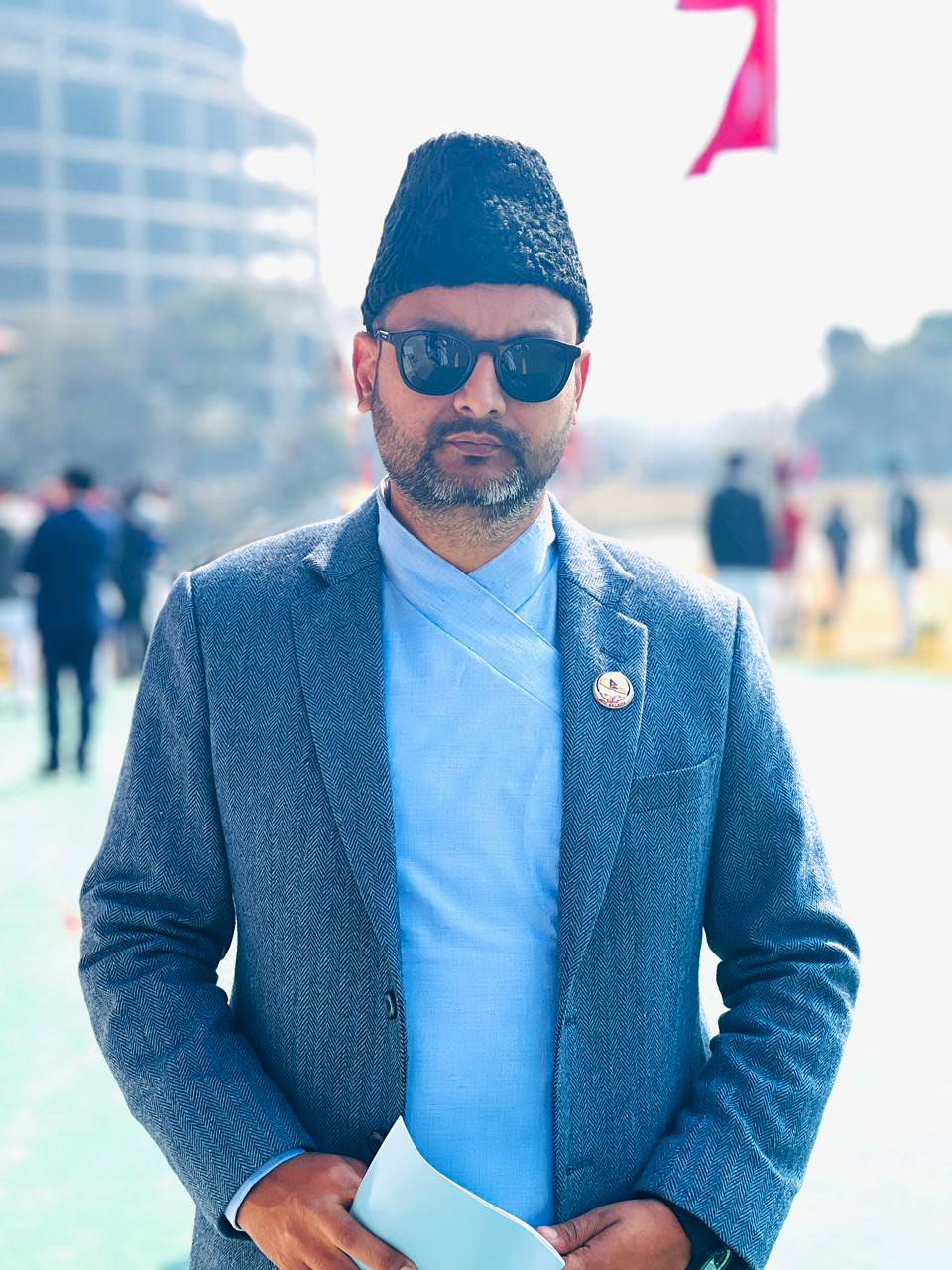

Joint General Secretary of the Rastriya Swatantra Party
- Incumbent
- Assumed office 26 June 2026 Serving with Hari Dhakal; Nisha Dangi
- President: Rabi Lamichhane

Member of the House of Representatives
- In office 22 December 2022 – 9 September 2025

Personal details
- Born: 1 April 1982 (age 44)
- Party: Rastriya Swatantra Party
- Occupation: Politician, film director, producer

Asim Shah (born 1 April 1982) is a Nepali politician, film director, and producer who is currently serving as a joint general secretary of Rastriya Satantra Party (RSP). He was also a Member of Parliament in the 6th House of Representatives of Nepal, elected in the 2022 general election as a proportional representative from the Muslim category of the Rastriya Swatantra Party.

Born into a Nepali Muslim family, Shah is also known for his work in Nepali cinema and television prior to entering politics.

== Film and media career ==
Born in Kathmandu, Shah worked in the Nepali film and television industry as a director and producer before entering politics. He was the producer of the feature film Karkash (2013) and was the director of commercially successful film Dui Rupaiya (2017). In addition to feature films, he has worked extensively in television commercials and media production.

His work in cinema has been noted for its contemporary themes and contribution to mainstream Nepali filmmaking.

== Political career ==
=== Member of Parliament (2022–2025) ===
Shah joined the Rastriya Swatantra Party (RSP) and was elected to the House of Representatives in the 2022 general elections under the proportional representation system (Muslim category).

During his tenure, he was vocal on issues such as freedom of expression, governance reform, and youth participation in politics. He also spoke publicly against film censorship practices in Nepal.

In September 2025, Shah resigned from Parliament, citing dissatisfaction with the government’s handling of youth protests and concerns over democratic accountability.

=== Political advisor to the Prime Minister (2026–present) ===
In March 2026, Asim Shah was appointed as the Political Advisor to the Prime Minister of Nepal, Balendra Shah.

He is considered a close associate of Balendra Shah and had been involved in political coordination efforts prior to the formation of the government. Reports indicate that he played a role in facilitating discussions and negotiations between political actors, including engagement with the Rastriya Swatantra Party, which contributed to building political support.

As Political Advisor, Shah is part of the Prime Minister’s core advisory team and is involved in political strategy, coalition coordination, and governance-related consultations, although the exact scope of his responsibilities has not been formally detailed.

His appointment marked his return to a central role in national politics following his resignation from Parliament in 2025.

=== Joint General Secretary of the Rastriya Swatantra Party ===
Shah was elected Joint General Secretary of the Rastriya Swatantra Party at the party's first general convention held in Chitwan on 26 June 2026. He was elected alongside Hari Dhakal and Nisha Dangi.

== Personal life ==
Shah is the brother of Asif Shah, a Nepali film actor, producer, singer, and television personality.

== Filmography ==
- Karkash (2013)
- Dui Rupaiya (2017)
