= Indira Joshi =

Indira Joshi may refer to:

- Indira Joshi (actor) (born 1942), British Indian actor
- Indira Joshi (singer) (born 1986), Nepalese singer
