= Kutu Ma Kutu =

- Cover of "Kutu Ma Kutu"

Song by Rajan Raj Shiwakoti, Melina Rai, Rajan Ishan

from the album Dui Rupaiya (Original Motion Picture Soundtrack)
- Language: Nepali
- Published: 2017
- Released: 2017
- Recorded: 2017
- Genre: Pop; Lok Geet
- Length: 5:54
- Label: G21 Production
- Songwriter: Rajan Raj Shiwakoti

Dui Rupaiya (Original Motion Picture Soundtrack) track listing
- 1. "Dui Rupaiyan"; 2. "Kutu Ma Kutu"; 3. "Talkyo Jawani"

Music video
- "Kutu Ma Kutu" on YouTube

Audio sample
- "Kutu Ma Kutu": file; help

Kutu Ma Kutu, also known as Kutu Ma Kutu Supari Dana (Nepali:कुटुमा कुटु or कुटुमा कुटु सुपारी दाना) is a Nepalese song from the 2017 Nepalese film Dui Rupaiya. The song is sung by Rajan Raj Shiwakoti, Melina Rai and Rajan Ishan, with lyrics and music by Prashidhika Tiwari, directed by Asim Shah. The music video of the track features actors Asif Shah, Nischal Basnet, Swastima Khadka and Buddhi Tamang. On 22 December 2017 Kutu Ma Kutu became the first Nepalese YouTube video to reach 100 million views and it is the most viewed Nepalese video on YouTube currently viewing over 200 million times, also it was the fastest song to gain 20 million views and in 49 days the song managed to gain 10 Million views.

The name "Kutu Ma Kutu" is a Neologism that refers as the word kutu kutu mean something that is hard when chewing it and the word supari dana means Areca nut. The word is usually used to invite someone to a function than you chew the nut to accept the invitation. You can read kutu ma kutu lyrics .

== Background ==
The song is composed by Prashidhika Tiwari, the song has the mix of Nepalese beats including Madal, Bansuri and Contemporary classical music with a classic Nepalese flavor to it. The lyrics were written by Rajan Raj Shiwakoti. Rajan Raj Shiwakoti who is known for bring Nepalese culture into his music videos and songs and he is known for another popular song such as Surkhe Thai, Purba Pashim etc.

== Music video ==
The music video features popular actors from Nepal including Asif Shah, Nischal Basnet, Swastima Khadka and Buddhi Tamang, in the music video Asif Shah and Nischal Basnet who're running away from the police and they go on a mela (function) while in a run) and dance with Swastima Khadka.

== Release ==
The music video for song was released on 28 May 2017 in video sharing website YouTube, through the YouTube channel of HighlightsNepal. The music video is the first song released from the film than "Talkyo Jawani" and "Dui Rupaiyan". The song was released under the banner of the G21 Production and Black Horse Pictures.

== Critical reception ==
The song became Nepal's most viewed video in YouTube currently having more than 100 million views.

== Track listing ==
No.	Title	Lyrics	Music	Singer(s)	Length
1.	"Kutu Ma Kutu"	Rajan Raj Shiwakoti	Rajan Raj Shiwakoti	Rajan Raj Shiwakoti, Rajan Ishan, Melina Rai	5:54
Total length:					5:54

== Awards ==
Awards
Award	Category	Result	Notes
Radio Kantipur Music Award	People’s Choice Award	Nominated	
NFDC Film Award 2074	Best Playback Singer (For Rajan Raj Siwakoti)	Nominated	
NFDC Film Award 2074	Best Dance Choreographer (For Kabi Raj Gahatraj)	Nominated	
NFDC Film Award 2074	Best Music Composer (For Rajan Raj Siwakoti)	Won	

== Credits and personnel ==
Original version

- Rajan Raj Shiwakoti - writer, music and lead vocals
- Shyam Swet Rashaili - mixing
- Rajan Ishan - arranger
- Kabiraj Gahatraj - choreographer
- Lokesh Bajracharya - editor
- Asim Shah - director

== See also ==
Other major Song and Movies in Nepal include:

- Dui Rupaiya
- Chhakka Panja 2
- Ye Daju Nasamau
