= Kutu =

Kutu may refer to:

- The Kutu people of Tanzania
  - Kutu language, the native language of the Kutu people

== Places ==
- Kutu, Democratic Republic of the Congo, a town and territory
- Kutu (island), a municipality in the Federated States of Micronesia

== Broadcasting ==
- KUTU (FM), a radio station in St. George, Utah, United States
- KUTU-CD, a television station in Tulsa, Oklahoma, United States

== See also ==
- "Kutu Ma Kutu", a 2017 song
