= Nandita K.C. =

Nepalese Actress

- Born: Shova K.C. September 14, 1983 (age 42); Narpani-07, Arghakhanchi, Nepal
- Citizenship: Nepalese
- Occupations: Actress, model, social worker

Nandita K.C. (Nepali: नन्दिता केसी) is a Nepalese actress and professional model. She is also active in social works and co-founder of a non-profit organization “We for all”. She has appeared in numerous music videos, television commercials, print ads and dozens of Nepali movies.

== Early life ==
She was born in Narpani, Arghakhanchi-7, Nepal. She was the youngest daughter of Mr. Bhim Bahadur K.C. and Mrs. Chetkala K.C. After high school she wanted to study nursing. She didn't have plans to become an actress before she got a role in a local movie in Butwal, Western Nepal where she also learned dancing at Raj Shree Dance Center.

== Filmography ==
Nandita K.C.'s first film was "Indreni". and she has played in more than 30 movies ever since. In the music videos sector, she was first noticed through "Sannani" sung by Babu Bogati. and by now has featured in more than a hundred music videos.
"The Yug Dekhi Yug Samma" in 2009 with opposite star cast Rajesh Hamal and "Bato Muni Ko Phool" in 2010 are among her popular movies.

== Works ==
Sectors
Films	Telefilms	TV/Paper Ads	Notes
Indreni	Parichaya	Suzuki scooter	Parichaya was aired in 100 episodes on Nepal Television
Hami Teen Bhai	Darsan Jindagiko	City Money Transfer	Darsan Jindagiko was aired in 85 episodes on Nepal 1 TV
Basanta Ritu	Jhajhalko	Pooja Washing Soap	Jhajhalko was aired in 51 episodes on Nepal 1 TV
Karma Ko Fal	Katha Prem Ma	Koseli Cooking Oil	Katha Prem Ma was aired on Kantipur Television Network
Bas Ma Chhaina Yo Mann	Shyabaas	Barah Jewelers	Shyabaas was produced by MaHa and aired on Nepal Television

Other Films
S.N.	Title of the Film	S.N.	Title of the Film
1	Timi Matra Timi	14	Jindagani Darpan Chhaya
2	Nishana	15	Bhanideu Na Maya Garchhu
3	Tirkha	16	Kaifiyat
4	Balwaan	17	Ma Maya Garchhu Timilai
5	Chhori Ko Karma	18	Maya Nagara
6	Sapana	19	Mrigatrishna
7	Trishul	20	The Yug Dekhi Yug Samma
8	Malati Ko Bhatti	21	Kisan
9	Parai	22	Naya Nepal
10	Yuddha	23	Janayuddha
11	Bato Muni Ko Phool	24	Taqdeer
12	Logne Manchhe	25	Bhagwan Sabaiko
13	Chankhe Pankhe Sankhe	26	Bharosa

== Awards and honors ==
Award	Title	Film	Notes
FOG International Film Awards 2015	Best Supporting Actress	Bato Muni Ko Phool	Event held in Silicon Valley, California, USA.
National Film Award 2068	Best Supporting Actress	Bato Muni Ko Phool	National Film Awards (Nepal)
NEFTA Film Award 2068	Best Supporting Actress	Timi Matra Timi	Nepal Film Technicians Association
NEFTA Film Award 2013	Best Actress	Malati Ko Bhatti	Nepal Film Technicians Association
NEFTA KTV Award 2065	Best Supporting Actress	Yuddha	Nepal Film Technicians Association
CG Digital Film Award 2068	Best Supporting Actress	Bato Muni Ko Phool	Chaudhary Group
OFA 2013	Best Actress	Mrigatrishna	Online Filmykhabar Award

== Membership ==
Nandita K.C. is the Vice Treasurer at Nepal Artist Association and also a member of the Woman Empowerment Committee at Film Development Board of Nepal.
