= Sajja Chaulagain =

Nepalese singer (born 1997)

- Born: 4 December 1997 (age 28); Nepal
- Occupation: Singer
- Years active: 2018–present
- Known for: Winning season three of Nepal Idol
- Title: Nepal Idol (Season 3)
- Musical career
- Genres: Rock, Pop, Slow Rock
- Instruments: Vocal; Guitar

Sajja Chaulagain is Nepalese singer who won the title and became the first female winner of Nepalese TV series Nepal Idol. Winner for the season three with Prabin Bedwal as runner up and Kiran Kumar Bhujel as second runner up. Chaulagain was born at Pathari of Morang district. She is the lead vocalist of The Loading Band. Sajja Chaulagain is the daughter of Tanka Bahadur Chaulagain and Geeta Chaulagain.

Preceded by Ravi Oad	Nepal Idol; Winner; Season 3 (2020)	Succeeded by Bhupendra Thapa Magar
