= Mero Voice Universe =

Nepalese singing reality show

- Title screen of the program
- मेरो भ्वइस युनिभर्स
- Genre: Reality
- Directed by: Aleen Shrestha
- Presented by: Sandip Chhetri; Rima Bishwokarma
- Judges: Deep Shrestha; Shiva Pariyar; Anju Panta; Pushpan Pradhan; Suresh Adhikari; Sujata Varma
- Original language: Nepali
- No. of seasons: 2

Production
- Producers: Dilli Adhikari; Babu Surace D.C.; Bishal Aryal; Sagar Maharjan; Moshmi Gurung; Surendra B.K.; Sumesh Sharma
- Production locations: Kathmandu, Nepal
- Cinematography: Suman Maharjan & Team
- Camera setup: Multi-camera
- Running time: 65-75 minutes
- Production company: Open Doors Entertainment Pvt. Ltd.

Original release
- Network: Nepal Television
- Release: May 3, 2023

Mero Voice Universe is a Nepali-language singing reality show created by Intra-National Welfare and Support Foundation of America. It is broadcast on Nepal Television.

== Background ==
Mero Voice Universe is directed by Aleen Shrestha, and is Nepal's first international reality show. The show features Nepali-speaking contestants from all over the world. There are contestants from over 52 countries. The show started on May 3, 2023, and it features six judges. The contestant needs approval from at least three judges to succeed in the audition round, which is called "sightless audition", where the judges are not able to see the contestant until three judges hammer the buzzer of approval. The winning prize of the show is 1 crore Nepalese rupees, which is the highest winning amount for a Nepali reality show so far. Mr Dilli Adhikari, President of the Foundation, stated, “To preserve our culture, we must all work together. Our identity is rooted in our language, culture, and assistance to those in need.” “The Foundation’s main goal is to bring a musical revolution in the Nepali entertainment industry,” he add.

== Summary ==
The first season was released on May 3, 2023. Deep Shrestha, Shiva Pariyar, Anju Panta, Pushpan Pradhan, Suresh Adhikari, and Sujata Verma were the judges. The season was won by Pritam Rai.

Season	Year	Judges						Channel	Host	Winner	Runner-up
1	2023	Deep Shrestha	Shiva Pariyar	Anju Panta	Pushpan Pradhan	Suresh Adhikari	Sujata Varma	Nepal Television	Sandip Chhetri Rima Bishwokarma	Pritam Rai	Shishir Thatal
1	2025	Deep Shrestha	Shiva Pariyar	Anju Panta	Pushpan Pradhan	Suresh Adhikari	Sujata Varma	Nepal Television	Sandip Chhetri Rima Bishwokarma	Pratham Gurung	Topraj Tamang
