= Rima Bishwokarma =

Nepalese politician

Honourable Rima Bishwokarma
- रीमा विश्वकर्मा

Member of the House of Representatives
- Incumbent
- Assumed office 26 March 2026
- President: Ram Chandra Paudel
- Prime Minister: Balendra Shah
- PR group: Dalit (Women)
- Constituency: PR

Personal details
- Born: 5 August 1989 (age 37) Gulariya, Nepal
- Party: Rastriya Swatantra Party
- Other political affiliations: Ujyalo Nepal Party
- Height: 1.63 m (5 ft 4 in)
- Spouse: Robert Lwagun Bishwokarma (m. 2015; div. 2017)
- Parents: Babu Ram Bishwokarma (father); Krishna Devi Bishwokarma (mother)
- Education: Siddhartha Vanasthali Institute, Panauti Branch (Lower Secondary); Nava Ratna English Secondary School (SLC); Pinnacle Academy
- Profession: Politician; model; actress; presenter

Rima Bishwokarma (Note: Nepali: रीमा विश्वकर्मा, romanized: Rīmā Bishwakarmā, pronounced [/riːma bɪʃʋəkərma/], simple pronunciation: REE-maa BISH-wa-kar-maa) (born 5 August 1989) is a Nepalese politician, model, actress, and media personality. She has served as a member of parliament representing the Rastriya Swatantra Party since March 2026.

== Early life and education ==
Bishwokarma was born on 5 August 1989 in Gulariya, Bardiya, Nepal, to Krishna Devi Bishwokarma and Babu Ram Bishwokarma. In 1997, she moved to Panauti, where she was raised. She attended Siddhartha Vanasthali Institute, Panauti for her lower-secondary education and completed her School Leaving Certificate (SLC) from Nava Ratna English Secondary School. She is pursuing a bachelor's degree in Mass Communication at Pinnacle Academy. She is currently in the third year of a bachelor's degree in Mass Communication at Pinnacle Academy.

== Early career ==
Before beginning her acting career, Bishwokarma worked as a video jockey (VJ) for Nepal Television and as a news presenter for National TV. She appeared in the music video "Jindagibhar Saath Dinchhu Bhannele" by Chris KC and subsequently featured in numerous Nepali music videos.

Bishwokarma made her film debut in the 2011 Nepali film Swor, directed by Prasanna Poudel and produced by MRS Movies. She later appeared in films including Visa Girl, Ritu, and Baato Muniko Phool 2. She also participated in the filming of music videos and films in locations including Rajasthan, India, and Australia.

Bishwokarma served as a co-host of the reality television show Nepal Idol. She has also hosted Comedy Champion, a Nepali comedy reality television program.

== Political career ==
In November 2025, Rima Bishwokarma joined the Ujyaalo Nepal Party led by energy expert Kul Man Ghising and was included in the party's proportional representation (PR) list amid discussions on a broader alliance and merger with the Rastriya Swatantra Party (RSP). Following the announcement of a merger between RSP and Ujyaalo Nepal, Ujyaalo Nepal's PR nominees were incorporated into the joint list. However, the merger collapsed after 12 days due to leadership disputes, and Bishwokarma remained with the RSP.

Bishwokarma was subsequently elected as a Member of Parliament (MP) from the Rastriya Swatantra Party (RSP) in the 2026 general election. She was elected through the party's proportional representation list under the Dalit women category. She took her oath of office in Nepali during a parliamentary oath-taking ceremony held at the Parliament of Nepal on 2 April 2026.

== Filmography ==
=== Films ===
Year	Film	Role	Notes	Ref(s)
2011	Swor			
2012	Visa Girl	Chhaya		
2014	Ritu	Kripa		
2015	Escape			
2016	Bhale fight			
2016	Bato Muniko Phool 2			
2022	Hijo Aaja Ko Kura			
2023	Jackie I am 21			

=== Television ===
Year	Program	Role	Notes
2017-2018, 2024	Nepal Idol	Host	Season 1, 2, 5-present
2019-present	Comedy Champion	Host	Season 1, 2, 3-present
2023	Mero Voice Universe	Host	
2022	saregamapa little champs nepal	Host	
