= Sambhujeet Baskota =

Nepali music composer (born 1957)

Shambhujeet Baskota शम्भूजीत बासकोटा
- Born: Shambhujeet Baskota; March 15, 1957 (age 69); Nepal
- Occupations: Music composer; singer; songwriter
- Years active: 1971–present
- Spouse: Uttara

Sambhujeet Baskota (Nepali: शम्भूजीत बासकोटा; also spelled Sambhujit or Shambhujeet) is a Nepali composer, singer and lyricist. He is considered to be one of the most popular and prolific music composers and singers of Nepali cinema. He has composed music for more than 355 Nepali feature films, more than 2,000 Nepali modern songs, folk songs, and bhajans (religious songs). He currently serves as a member of Vibhushan committee.

He is recognized as director of first Nepali music video Mayalu Timi Tadha, which was released in 1985 and was sung by well-known actor Bhuwan KC. He also works for an anti-drug program to help children. He is one of the singers among 365 artists of Nepal who participated to sing an environmental song titled "Melancholy," which set a Guinness World Record. The song was conceptualized, written, composed and directed by environmentalist Nipesh Dhaka.

Baskota has two sons and two daughters. His son Shauryajeet is also a musical director and composed the music for the film Kusume Rumal 2. Baskota's children are closely associated with the film industry. His daughter Mela Baskota has appeared as a child actress in many Nepali Feature Films.

Baskota was also one of four judges on the fourth season of Nepal Idol, a popular singing reality show in Nepal. He has also been honored with 8th Fr E.L. Watrin Memorial Cultural Award at Survaahini, A Musical Bliss organized by St. Xavier's College.
