= Rajan Raj Shiwakoti =

Nepali folk singer

Rajan Raj Shiwakoti राजनराज शिवाकोटी
- Born: Dolakha District, Nepal
- Genres: Folk/Film
- Occupation(s): Singer, Composer, Songwriter

Rajan Raj Shiwakoti (Nepali: राजनराज शिवाकोटी) is a Nepalese folk and film songwriter, composer and singer.

== Biography ==
Shiwakoti was born in Dolakha District kshamawati of Nepal. He is married to Kabita Mainali.

== Music career ==
Shiwakoti has composed, written and sang some notable songs such as

=== Songs ===
- Surke Thaili Khai as composer and songwriter
- Kutu Ma Kutu as composer and songwriter
- Phul Butte Sari as composer and songwriter
- Barta Garaideu as composer, writer and songwriter
- Gojima Dam Chaina
- Purba Paschim Rail
- Ukusmukus
- Jau Maya Jau (Nepali:जाउँ माया जाउँ)

=== Albums ===
Some of the music albums of Siwakoti are:

- Lok Teheri
- Lok Teheri part 2

== Soundtrack ==
- Anjila, music director

== Awards ==
- Sixth NFDC National Film Awards for Kutuma Kutu from the movie Dui Rupaiyan
- Hits FM Music Awards 2019 - best song for motion picture
- Hits FM Music Awards 2020 - best song for motion picture, for Goji ma Daam Chaina
