= Hari Dhakal =

Nepali politician

Honourable Hari Dhakal
- हरि ढकाल

Member of Parliament, Pratinidhi Sabha
- Incumbent
- Assumed office 22 December 2022
- Preceded by: Surendra Pandey
- Constituency: Chitwan 1

Joint General Secretary of the Rastriya Swatantra Party
- Incumbent
- Assumed office 26 June 2026 Serving with Asim Shah; Nisha Dangi
- President: Rabi Lamichhane

Personal details
- Born: 18 July 1983 (age 43) Chitwan District, Nepal
- Party: Rastriya Swatantra
- Spouse: Ganga Dhakal
- Parent(s): Durga Nath Dhakal (father); Ghani Maya Dhakal (mother)
- Education: Sociology and Political Science

Hari Dhakal (Note: Nepali: हरि ढकाल) (born 18 July 1983) is a Nepali politician and member of the Rastriya Swatantra Party, who is also a joint general secretary of the party. He is serving as a Member of the House of Representatives representing Chitwan-1 since December 2022.

He was first elected in the 2022 Nepalese general election, defeating former finance minister Surendra Pandey.

== Political career ==
=== 2022 election ===
In the 2022 general election, Dhakal was elected from Chitwan-1 as a candidate of the Rastriya Swatantra Party. He received 34,189 votes, defeating Surendra Prasad Pandey of CPN (UML) and Bishwanath Poudel, the current Governor of Nepal Rastra Bank(2025-present).

=== 2082 (2026) general election ===
In the 2082 B.S. (2026 A.D.) general election, Dhakal was re-elected from Chitwan-1. He secured 58,208 votes and defeated Rajendra Prasad Burlakoti of the Nepali Congress, who received 13,033 votes. He retained his seat as Member of Parliament from the constituency.

=== Joint General Secretary of the RSP ===
Dhakal was elected Joint General Secretary of the Rastriya Swatantra Party at the party's first general convention held in Chitwan on 26 June 2026. He was elected alongside Asim Shah and Nisha Dangi, while Bipin Kumar Acharya was elected General Secretary.

== Parliamentary roles ==
As of 2026, Dhakal continues to serve as a Member of Parliament in the House of Representatives. He is also associated with parliamentary committees, including the State Affairs and Good Governance Committee.

== Personal life ==
Dhakal was born in Chitwan District. His father, Durga Nath Dhakal, is an astrologer. He studied Sociology and Political Science.
