= Buddha Lama =

Nepalese singer

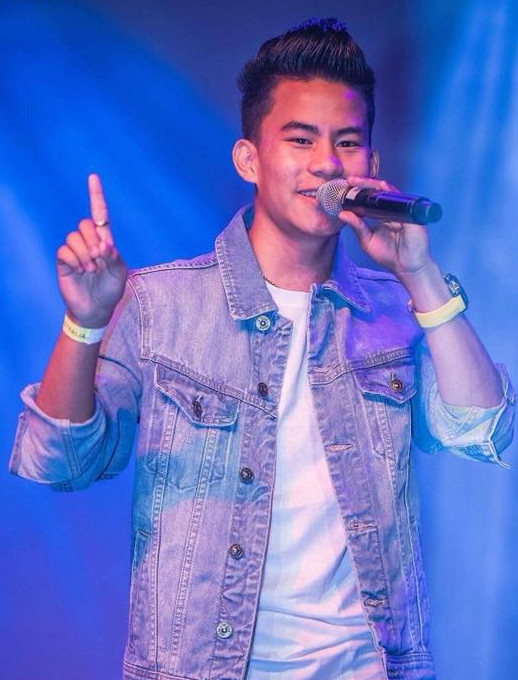
- Buddha Performing
- Born: November 23, 1997 (age 28); Pokhara, Nepal
- Other names: Nepal Idol Winner
- Occupation: Singer/Model
- Years active: 2015–present
- Known for: Winning season one of Nepal Idol
- Title: Nepal Idol (Season 1)
- Musical career
- Genres: Pop
- Instruments: Vocal; Guitar
- Label: Nepal Idol Records

Buddha Lama (born November 23, 1997) is a Nepalese singer, actor, dancer and model who rose to fame after winning the title and becoming the first winner of Nepalese TV series Nepal Idol. Since winning Nepal Idol, he has become a teen idol. Lama holds the title for Nepal Idol winner for the season one with Nishan Bhattarai as runner up and Partap Das as second runner up. Buddha Lama is runner-up of Nepal’s first session of Dancing with the stars.

== Career ==
=== Nepal Idol success ===
Lama participated in Nepalese reality television show Nepal Idol and he managed to win the show with the prize of Pranish, 20 Lakhs NPR, album and contract worth of 15 Lakhs. After winning Nepal Idol, he went to the Nepal Idol Worldwide Tour with Nishan Bhattarai and Pratap Das. He was also in limelight due to his row with the organizers regarding the prize money.

== Filmography ==
- Nepal Idol as Participant Buddha Lama
- "Saani"( Music Video ) Debut as Singer/Model
- He is also participating in dancing reality show Dancing with the Stars Nepal which is coming soon on Himalaya TV HD

== Tours ==
- Nepal Idol Worldwide Tour (2017–2018)

Preceded by –	Nepal Idol; Winner; Season 1 (2017)	Succeeded by Ravi Oad
