= Jamim Shah =

Nepalese businessman

- Born: 23 April 1963; Kathmandu, Nepal
- Died: 7 February 2010 (aged 46); Kathmandu, Nepal (near the French Embassy)
- Cause of death: Assassination
- Occupation: Chairman of Channel Nepal Pvt. Ltd.
- Known for: Pioneering cable television and Fiber Network technology
- Children: 1

Kathmandu is located in Nepal and is the capital city.

Jamim Shah (Nepali: जमिम शाह) (1963–2010) was a Nepalese media entrepreneur and the chairman of Channel Nepal Pvt. Ltd. He was the pioneer of commercial cable television network in Nepal with over 1,000 kilometres of cable network. He also owned two newspapers (now closed) and a television channel Channel Nepal, which was the first satellite television channel in Nepal. He was killed by gangsters after being alleged of being linked to multinational terrorist Dawood Ibrahim and the ISI.

== Career ==
Jamim Shah, a media tycoon, was the owner of two newspapers, a television station and had a virtual monopoly in the distribution of satellite television channels in Kathmandu through his large cable network. He worked for the first company in Nepal to uplink via satellite. Two days before the launch, the Ministry of Information and Communication told the Space and Time company it had an incomplete test of its equipment. Space and Time was trying to get the approval from the government to begin. They figured all paperwork was in order. However, the green light was yet to come. Space and Time was also beginning to have issues with India, China, and Pakistan. Space and Time suspended India's viewing for a week. The satellite license was important to Shah because with it, Channel Nepal would be beamed to 52 countries in Asia. Jamim received his license in 1993. However, his license was later revoked by the government on the grounds that the company had not paid its dues. The company was allowed to go ahead with transmission but wanted to expand further.

He was alleged of being a henchman of Dawood Ibrahim and Pakistani Inter-Services Intelligence (ISI) agency, which he denied, and was blamed for using his television channel to whip up anti-India violence. Channel Nepal was banned temporarily in 2000 after wrongly attributing anti-Nepal comments to Bollywood star Hrithik Roshan, sparking riots which left four people dead and 180 people injured in Nepal.

== Death ==
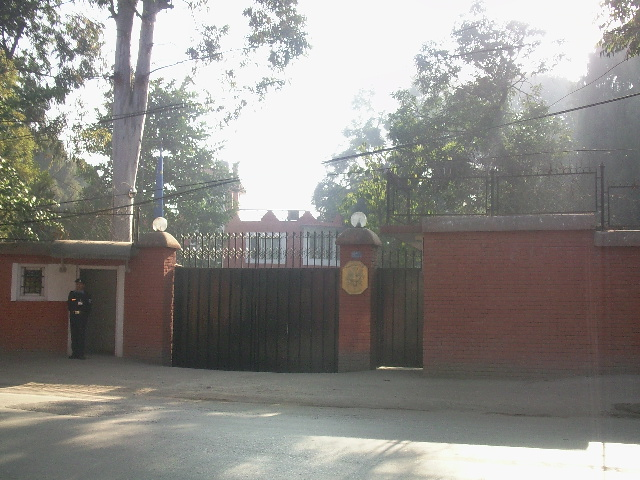
Jamim Shah was murdered outside the French Embassy (pictured) in Kathmandu.

Jamim Shah was gunned down by two assailants on a motorcycle near the French embassy on 7 February 2010 in Kathmandu. The assailants were on a motorcycle with plate number Ba15Pa8733. Shah was accused of having ties to both a major Indian crime syndicate and to Pakistan's Inter-Services Intelligence agency. Shah was shot twice in the head and once in the chest in broad daylight. He later died of his injuries. Shah had received death threats prior to being gunned down. He was under a lot of stress in the days before the attack.

=== Investigation ===
The police linked Shah while alive to the Indian underworld including Dawood Ibrahim, India's most wanted. Shah had previously denied these allegations.

India's underworld don Bhagwant Singh, alias Bharat Nepali, confessed to Jamim Shah's death. He said, "We killed Jamim. This will be the fate of anyone who stands against India." Nepali was later killed by another henchman named don Chhota Rajan of Bangkok, Thailand.

The police say the same hit man that killed Shah also possibly killed Faizan Ahmad, the general secretary of the Islamic Association, and tried to kill Yunus Ansari, the chairman of National Television.

Authorities arrested 18 people in connection with Jamin Shah's death, including 3 police officers and 2 people are still at large. An early suspect was an Indian national who was detained at the airport in Katmandu. A man named Manmeet Singh Bhatiya, the suspected hit man, was arrested. The three suspected officers that arranged the murder were also arrested. In all, 18 were arrested in connection with Shah's murder. At large are Jagadish Chand, a former deputy superintendent of the Police and Dri Drishna Poudel, a sub-inspector of the Nepal Police.

=== Context ===
Since Jamim Shah was conducting business in the Indian subcontinent, it was believed early on that his murder had something to do with conflict between India and Pakistan.

Before Shah's murder, Uma Singh, a reporter for Radio Today FM, was hacked to death in her own home. She was also a Women's Right Advocate. After Singh's murder, violence in Nepal against media increased. Around the time of Shah's death, more journalists were receiving threats. The criminal underworld is still a concern by police, as well. According to a report, three police officers planned Jamim Shahs death.

=== Reaction ===
In popular culture in Nepal, Shah's death attracted national attention and his murder was examined on national TV.

== Personal life ==
Shah born in Wotu area of Kathmandu was a descendant of a Kashmiri family. He got his primary education from Laboratory School in Kirtipur and completed high schooling from Durbar High School. He then went to Taiwan aiming to be a pilot but he did not complete the formal training. Shah's business ambitions had started in a fashion shop, when he was still in college. Jamim was the second son of a retired government officer Dr. Mohim and Ayesha Shah. He was married to Anjali at an age of 22.

== Impact ==
Jamim was known as the "Cable King" in Nepal. Sources say that the Indian prime minister's powerful security adviser, Brajesh Mishra, allowed Jamin Shah to go on air. Jamim publicly threatened to go to court if his satellite permission was cancelled.
