= Deep Shrestha =

Nepalese singer and musician

Deep Shestha दीप श्रेष्ठ
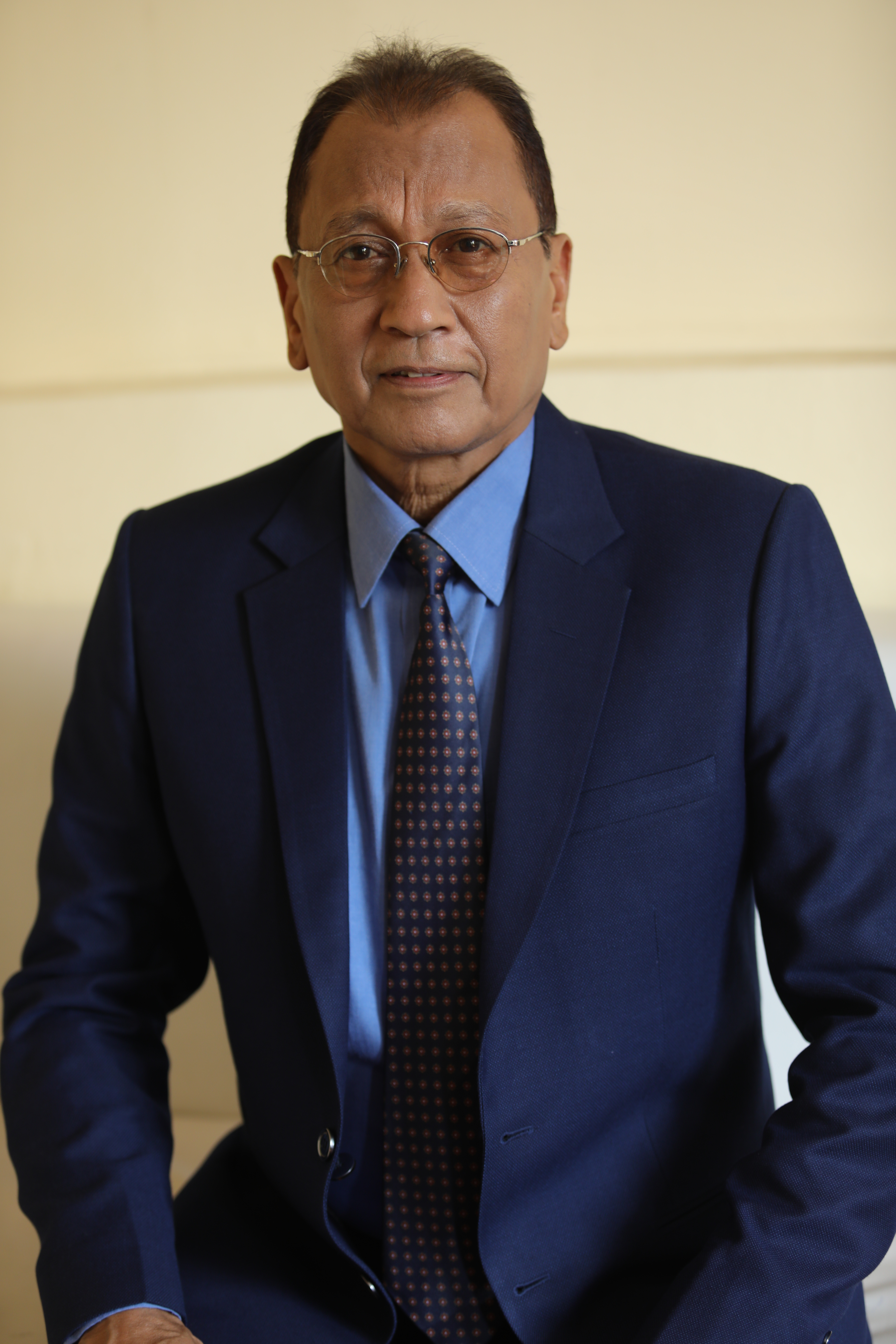

Background information
- Born: Dharan, Nepal
- Occupation(s): Singer, musician

Deep Shrestha (Nepali: दीप श्रेष्ठ) is a Nepalese singer and musician. Deep Shrestha is one of the coaches in The Voice of Nepal Season 1 (2018) and 2 (2019) and Season 3.He is also judge in Mero Voice Universe season 1. "Jhaskiyecha Maan Mero", "Biteka Kura Le" and "Ma Ta Door Dekhi Aye" are among his popular songs.

== Early life ==
Shrestha composed his first song "Ma Patharko Deuta Haina" when he was 14. He comes from a musical family in Dharan, Nepal. His father Jaya Narayan Shrestha was an ustaad and played violin and flute. His mother Indira Shrestha was a singer. Deep met other musicians early through his father.

Deep Shrestha studied bioscience after he passed his SLC exams. He thought that he would continue his studies but he missed his exams thrice because he was busy performing as a musician.

== Career ==
Shrestha formally started his musical career in the late 1960s. This era is deemed as the golden era of Nepali modern music. Before this he performed in cultural programs and other locally organized functions in eastern Nepal. His opportunity to officially pursue music came when a Dharan theatre team came to Kathmandu to stage a drama in Rastriya Nachghar, including the Late King Mahendra. Shrestha portrayed a singer. His melodious voice and well-composed music held everyone spellbound. King Mahendra was so impressed that he allowed Shrestha to record as many songs as he wished. In 2025 (Bikram Sambat), when even established singers had to wait for many days to schedule a recording session at Radio Nepal (the only recording studio then), he was allowed to record six songs. In subsequent years, Shrestha came to Kathmandu once in a year to record. After 2028 B.S., Shrestha started participating in the Nationwide Music Competition, which led to a first prize in vocals in 2030 B.S. for the song "Bidhawako Sindoorko Rahar".

Shrestha was musically active for another decade. Then, slowly, he stopped singing. He was busy with his official work and 'did not feel like recording new songs'. The Nepalese music industry expanded and professionalized. Technology drew him back and he again started singing.

== Personal life ==
He married Sophiya Gurung who is originally from Darjeeling. They have two daughters. He works as an assistant music director at the Nepal Academy, Nepal. Shrestha has enriched the anthology of Nepali music with hundreds of modern and patriotic songs.

== Awards ==
- Best Male Vocal, Radio Nepal – 1970
- Best Male Vocal, Radio Nepal – 1971
- Best Male Vocal, Gold Medal, Radio Nepal – 1973
- Best Male Vocal Award, All Nepal Music Competition – 1983
- Chhinnalata Purashkar – 1993
- Radio Nepal, Samman Patra – 13 April 1999
- San Miguel Music Award – 2000
- Swar Sangam Sangitalaya, Biratnagar, Samman Patra – 2000
- Record of the Year, Hits FM Music Awards – 2001
- Best Male Vocal, Hits FM Music Awards – 2001
- Album of the Year, Hits FM Music Awards – 2001
- Best Vocal Performance, 6th Annual Image Award – 2003
- SEBA, Samman Patra – 27 May 2003
- Purvanchal Auddhogik Byapar Mela, Samman Patra – 17 February 2004
- Shri Rashtriya Jagriti Club, Itahari, Samman Patra – 10 November 2004
- Sadhana, Samman Patra – 10 July 2005
- Gorkha Dakshin Bahu, Fourth – 17 July 2005
- Image Lifetime Achievement Award – 2007
- Narayani Kala Mandir, Samman Patra – 3 January 2009.
- Kalanidhi Indira Sangeet Maha Vidyalaya, Samman Patra – 9 April 2009
- The Creative Hands of Nepal, Samman Patra – 8 October 2010
- Humdard, Samman Patra – 2010
- Purvanchal Sanskritik Sambardhan, Samman Patra
- Best Male Vocal Performance, Hits FM Award – 2010
- Best Male Vocal Performance, Image Award – 2012
- Best Song of the Year, Image Award – 2012
- Winning coach of Voice of Nepal Season 1 - 2018

== Discography ==
- Best of Narayan Gopal and Deep Shrestha (Ratna Records)
- Abhas, Part I & II (Cassettes – Nepal Television)
- Best of Deep Shrestha (CD, Cassettes – Melody Times)
- Bhajanaamrit (Cassettes – DS Music Nepal)
- Drisht (CD, Cassettes – DS Music Nepal)
- Shrinkhala (Music.com and DS Music Nepal)
- Aavriti (CD – DS Music Nepal)
- Antara (CD, DVD – DS Music Nepal)
- Yatra – I (CD – Music.com)
- Yatra – II (CD – Asian Music)

== TV ==
- The Voice of Nepal Season 1, 2 & 3 as a coach
