= Ravi Oad =

Nepalese Singer

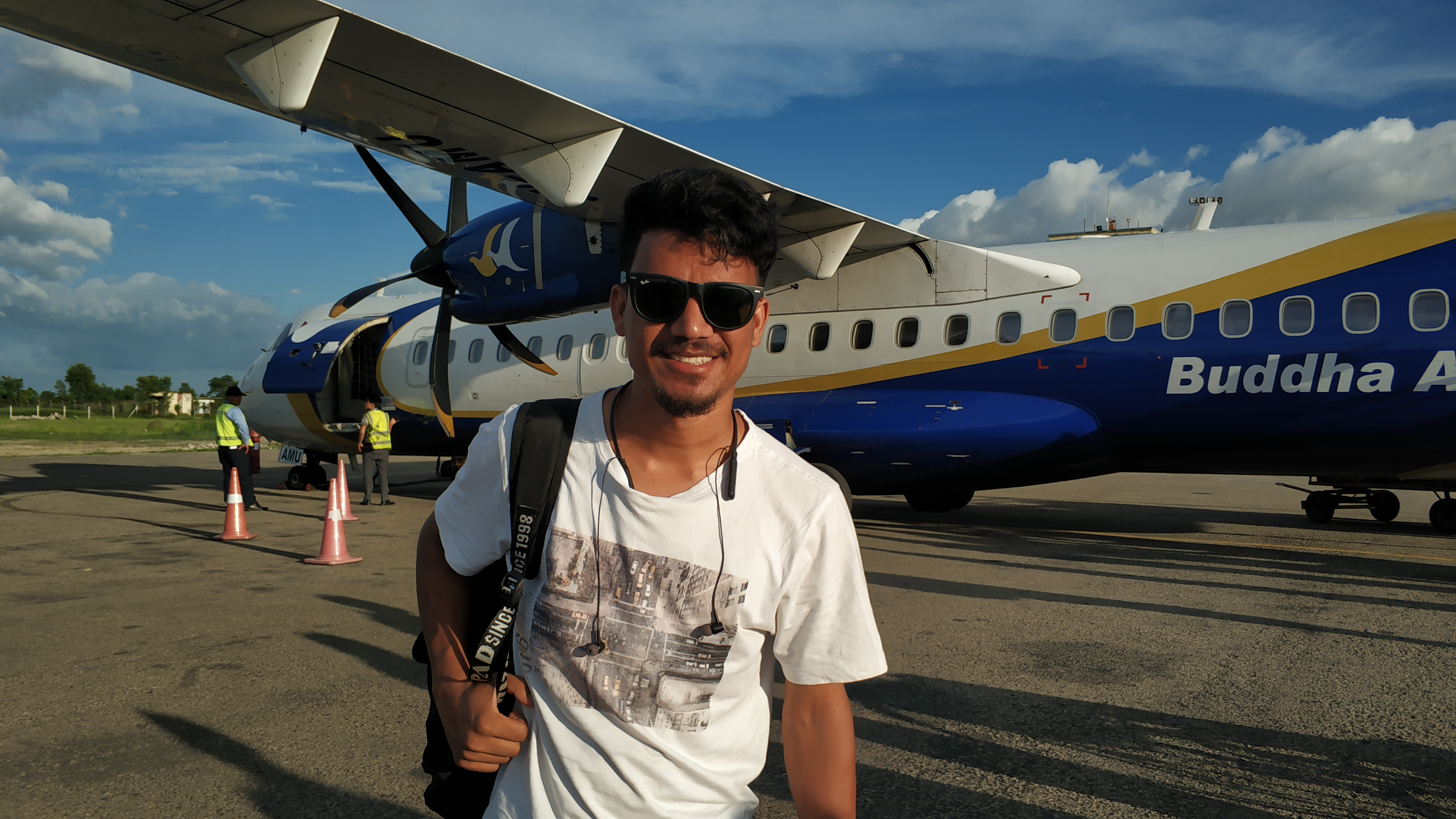
- Oad in 2019
- Born: Nepal
- Other names: Nepal Idol Winner
- Occupation: Singer
- Years active: 2017–present
- Known for: Winning season two of Nepal Idol
- Title: Nepal Idol (Season 2)
- Musical career
- Genres: Pop Folk
- Instrument: Vocal
- Labels: Nepal Idol Records

Ravi Oad is Nepalese singer, actor and dancer who rose to fame after winning the title and becoming the second season winner of Nepalese TV series Nepal Idol. Oad holds the title for Nepal Idol winner for the season two with Bikram Baral as runner up and Sumit Pathak as second runner up.

== Career ==
=== Nepal Idol success ===
Oad participated in Nepalese reality television show Nepal Idol and he managed to win the show with the prize of Pranish, 22 Lakhs NPR, and Honda WRV car along with world tour.

== Filmography ==
- Nepal Idol season 2 as Participant Ravi Oad

== Tours ==
- Nepal Idol Worldwide Tour (2018–present)
- Nepal Idol Japan Tour

Preceded by Buddha Lama	Nepal Idol; Winner; Season 2 (2018)	Succeeded by Sajja Chaulagain
