= Surke Thaili Khai =

2015 Nepalese film song

Single by Rajan Raj Shiwakoti, Anju Panta, Raju Biswokarma

from the album Woda Number 6 (soundtrack)
- Language: Nepali
- English title: Where is Thaili Pouch
- Published: 2015
- Released: 2015
- Genre: Folk
- Length: 3:40
- Label: Budha Subba Music
- Composer: Rajan Raj Shiwakoti
- Lyricist: Rajan Raj Shiwakoti

Music video
- "Surke Thaili Khai" on YouTube

Surke Thaili Khai (Nepali: सुर्के थैली खै; English: Where is the Tied-Pouch) or Surke Thaili is a Nepalese song by Rajan Raj Shiwakoti, Anju Panta, Raju Biswokarma, released on August 6, 2015. It was a single from soundtrack album Woda Number 6 (2015). The song was produced by Deepak Raj Giri, Kedar Ghimire, Deepa Shree Niraula and Jeetu Nepal. It is the second most viewed Nepalese song in YouTube currently viewing over 24 million. In the music video of the track features actors including Deepak Raj Giri, Priyanka Karki, Dipa Shree Niraula, Kedar Ghimire, Sitaram Kattel and Dayahang Rai.

== Background ==
Surke Thaili Khai is a song from Nepalese movie Woda Number 6. The song is sung by popular/rising Nepalese singers Anju Panta, Rajan Raj Shiwakoti and Raju Biswokarma. The song is written and composed by Rajan Raj Shiwakoti. The song has old Nepalese taste to the song and music video, Choreographed by Shankar B.C., edited by Gautam Raj Khadka and directed by Ujwal Ghimire.

== Music video ==
The music was released in video sharing website YouTube on August 6, 2015. The music video features popular actors from Nepal including Deepak Raj Giri, Priyanka Karki, Dipa Shree Niraula, Kedar Ghimire, Sitaram Kattel and Dayahang Rai, the music video follows the love story of these actors from the movie Woda Number 6 and they are in a Mela. It was the first Nepalese song to get 20 million views in video sharing website YouTube.

== Track listing ==
| No. | Title | Writer(s) | Singer(s) | Length |
|---|---|---|---|---|
| 1. | "Surke Thaili Khai" | Rajan Raj Shiwakoti | Rajan Raj Shiwakoti, Anju Panta, Raju Biswokarma | 3:40 |
| Total length: | | | | 3:40 |

== Awards ==
| Year | Ceremony | Award | Result | Ref. |
|---|---|---|---|---|
| 2016 | 18th Image Award | Public Choice Award | Won | |

== Credits and personnel ==
Original version

- Rajan Raj Shiwakoti, Anju Panta, Raju Biswokarma - Singers
- Rajan Raj Shiwakoti - Lyrics and Music
- Shankar B.C. - Choreographer
- Gautam Raj Khadka - Editor
- Deepak Bajracharya, Maan Krishna Shrestha - Cameramen
- Ujwal Ghimire - Director
