= Nhyoo Bajracharya =

Nepali music composer and singer

Nhyoo Bajracharya न्ह्यू बज्राचार्य
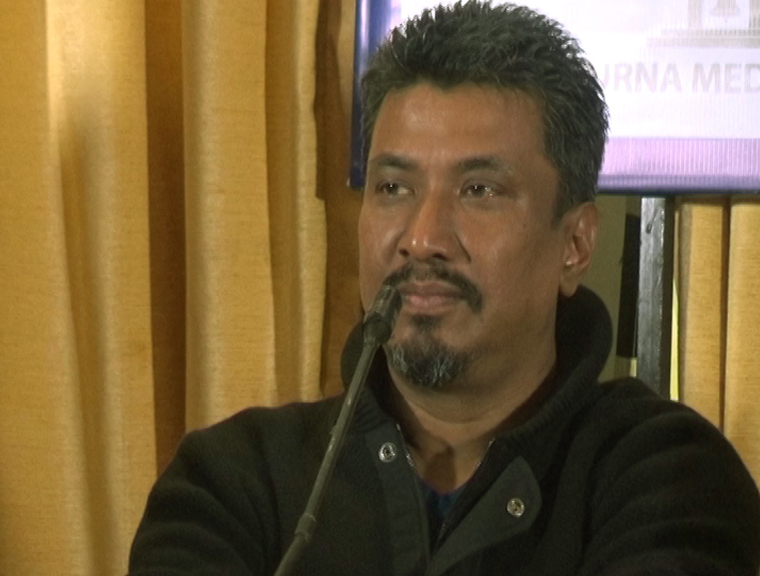
- Nhyoo Bajracharya in 28 September 2014 in a Television show

Background information
- Born: 15 September 1964 (age 61); Kathmandu, Nepal
- Occupation(s): Singer, composer, lyricist
- Years active: 1987–present
- Website: Official Youtube

Nhyoo Bajracharya (Nepal Bhasa न्ह्यू बज्राचार्य, born 15 September 1964) is a Nepali composer, lyricist, and singer. He is widely regarded as one of the best music composers in Nepali music industry. He has composed hundreds of famous songs in Nepali, Newar and Hindi, and one song in Chinese. He is also remembered for his compositions for Ani Choying Dolma with his fusion style of music. Some of his hit compositions are Saya Thari Baja Eutai Taal, Shanti Lukau Kaha, Phool ko Aakhama, Laaija Chari, Kya Bore Bhayo, Aadhi Baato Hide Pachi Timi Sita Bhet Vayo, Orali Lageko, among many others. He has also sung some of the songs but, he is better known as a music composer. His songs have been sung by Ani Choying Dolma, Ram Krishna Dhakal, Yogeshwor Amatya, Shreya Ghosal and other singers.

He regards winning a national music competition organized by Radio Nepal in 1987/88 as one of the turning points in his career. One of the judges in the competition was Swar Samrat Narayan Gopal, who was also a winner of that competition held several years before.

His influences in music composition are Gopal Yonjan, Naati Kaji.
