= Kunti Moktan =

Nepali singer (born 1962)

Kunti Moktan कुन्ती मोक्तान
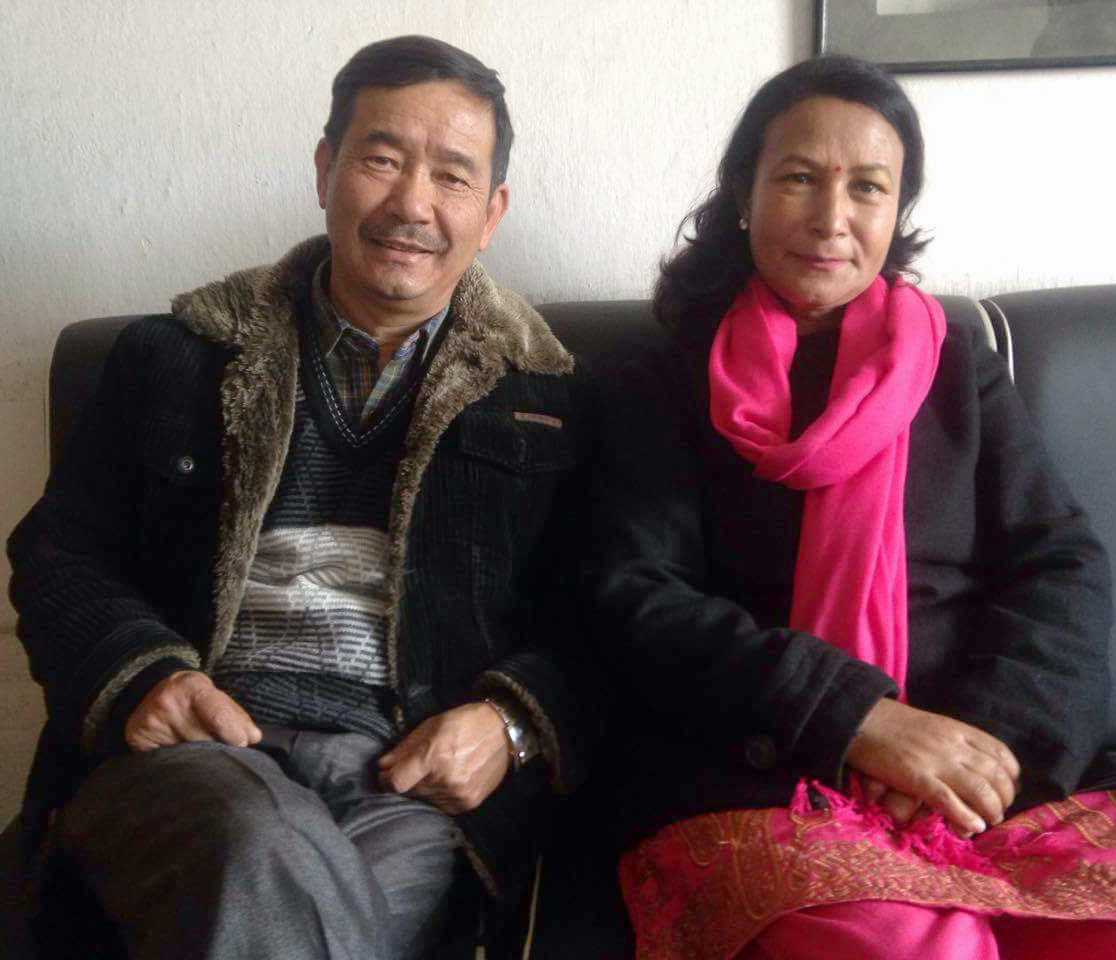
- Kunti Moktan with her husband Shila Bahadur Moktan

Background information
- Born: Kunti Sundas; 11 July 1962 (age 63); Darjeeling, India
- Genres: Folk, Modern
- Occupation: Singer
- Years active: 1977–present
- Spouse: Shila Bahadur Moktan (married 1983–present)

Kunti Moktan (née Sundas; Nepali: कुन्ती मोक्तान) (born 11 July 1962) is a Nepali singer. She is classically trained and sings Nepali folk and modern songs. She is best known for her folk–pop songs such as Choli Ramro, Nishthuri Mayalu and Mathi Mathi Sailungey Ma. She usually collaborate with her husband Shila Bahadur Moktan, who is a musician and a singer. Beside singing, she also teaches music at various schools.

== Early life ==
Kunti Moktan was born on 11 July 1962 in Margaret's Hope Tea Estate, Darjeeling district, India to father Prem Kumar Sundas and mother Bishnu Maya Sundas. She completed her high school–level education from Kurseong. In her high school, she also played football. She was a part of the first women football team from Darjeeling. She moved to Kathmandu, Nepal in 1983 to pursue her musical career.

== Musical career ==
Moktan started singing from an early age. She started her musical journey from St. Xavier's High School in Dilaram, India. When in Class 8, she passed the vocal test at All India Radio station in Kurseong and recorded her first song with All India Radio at the age of 15 and second song for Radio Nepal at the age of 18 in 1980. Both Kunti and her husband Shila Bahadur initially learnt music from Jagdish Chandra Rai in Sonada. She came to Kathmandu in 1980 for the first time to sing for the celebration of King Mahendra's birthday. She moved to Kathmandu permanently, with her husband, in 1983.

Moktan has performed in about 20 countries, including the India, United States, Japan, UK, Hong Kong, Germany, Switzerland and South Korea. Apart from singing, she plays the harmonium. Some of her most popular songs are Khutta Tandai Gara, Choli Ramro Palpali Dhakako, Sunkai Bhau Chha, Bhanchan Kohi Jindagi Yo, Mathi Mathi Sailungey Ma and Dali Dali Ma.

== Personal life ==
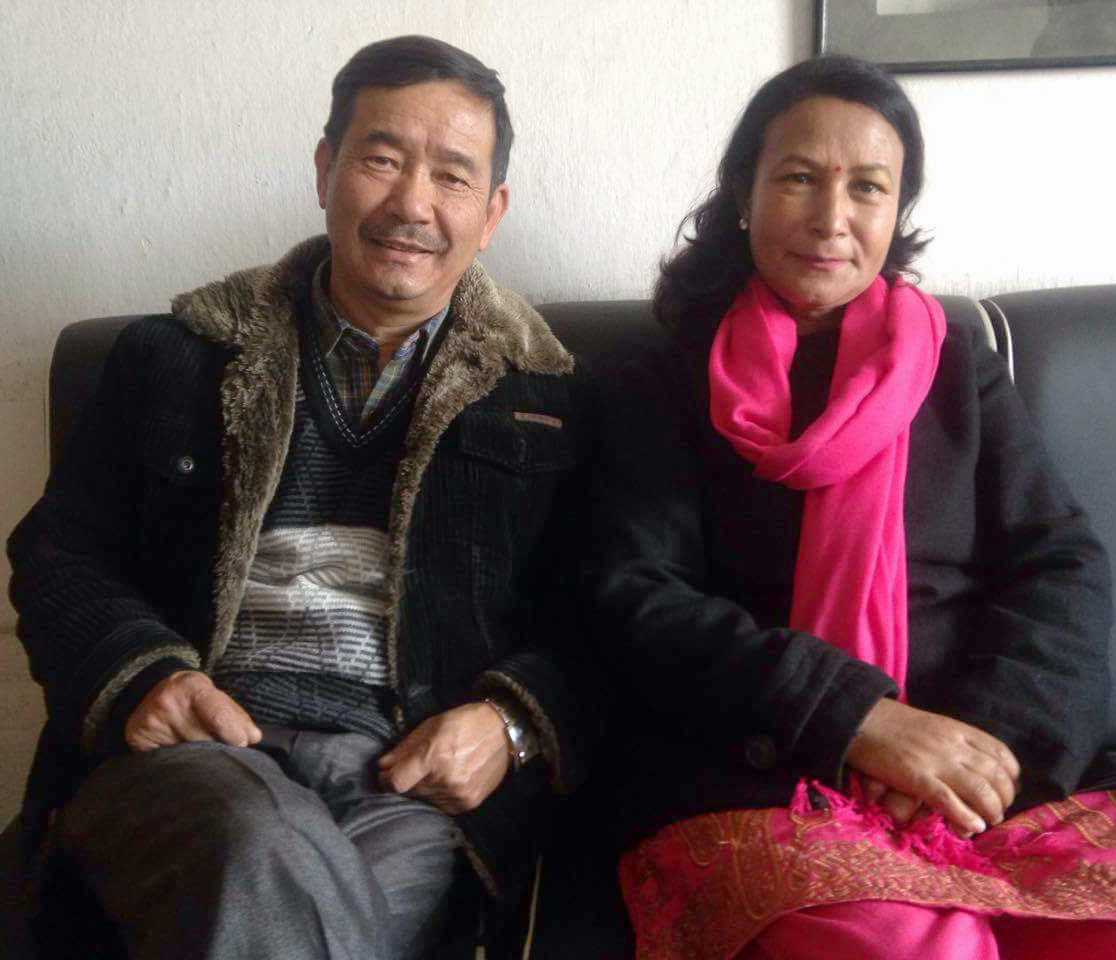
Kunti Moktan with her husband Shila Bahadur Moktan

She married Shila Bahadur Moktan, a Nepali musician and lyricist, in 1983. They have two daughters Shital Moktan and Subani Moktan who are also musicians.

== Discography ==
=== Albums ===
| Year of release | Name of the album | Number of songs |
|---|---|---|
| 1996 | Mero Man | 13 |
| 2000 | Kirti | 13 |
| 2003 | Kusum | 11 |
| 2008 | Manko Sapana | 12 |
| 2008 | Sailunge | 10 |
| 2008 | Mayalu Lai | 3 |
| 2009 | Kamero | 13 |
| 2010 | Birsi Janelai | 10 |
| 2010 | Kahile Kahi | 9 |
| 2013 | Hamro Bhet | 10 |
| 2020 | Koseli, Vol. 1 | 9 |
| 2020 | Koseli, Vol. 2 | 9 |

=== Singles ===
- Pahadi Pyara (2018)
- Gothalo Jada (feat. Subani Moktan) (2020)
- Timro Bhaye Pugcha (2020)

== Awards ==
- Chinnalata Geet Puraskar, Nepal
- Bhupalman Singh Yuba Puraskar, Nepal
- Nirman Samman, Sikkim
- Hits FM Music Award, Nepal
- Budha Subba Music Award
