= Asif Shah =

Nepalese TV presenter, actor, singer (born 1980)

- आसिफ शाह
- Born: 3 October 1980 (age 46); Kathmandu, Nepal
- Occupations: Producer, TV presenter, rapper, singer
- Years active: 2002–present
- Presenting career
- Show: Music of Your Choice, Image Platform, Nepal Idol
- Network: Image Channel, Channel Nepal, Nepal 1, Kantipur Television AP1 TV
- Country: Nepal

Asif Shah (Nepali: आसिफ शाह) is a Nepalese TV presenter, director, producer, actor, singer, and rapper. He is more popularly known for being music video director and also as a member of Nepalese hip hop group The Unity.

G21 Production is Ashif Shah's initiative as an independent AV production house, which he started in 2003. Since then, he has directed more than 200 music videos, more than 100 television commercials, directed a short film "Sonam" on HIV/AIDS awareness, directed a documentary "USAID Asha Ka Kiranharu", directed a PSA "USAID's 60 years", produced a radio spot for the ICRC, has produced and directed multiple social and corporate videos and directed an independent feature-length film Karkash. Later he joined famous Nepalese hip hop group The Unity along with DA69 and Aidray. The Unity has won various National Awards. Their hits includes "Pahilo Maya", "Aajha Feri", "Janu cha Aaajhai", "Prem Aani Aago", and "Aasha Aajhai".

== Career ==
Shah began his career from Channel Nepal in 2002 as a VJ and producer. During his tenure in Channel Nepal, he produced and presented various music-related programmes. In 2003, he joined Nepal 1 channel as a senior producer and presenter where he produced and presented shows like "Sanga Sangai", "A day out with celebrity", "Puraskar Dus Hajar" and "4U". All these shows have garnered high TRP (Television Rating Points). He has worked in Kantipur Television as well, where he produced and presented "KTV Shop", and also in Image Channel as senior producer and presenter for the show "Image Platform" and "Music of Your Choice". During his tenure in Image Channel, he created promotions for "Music of Your Choice" and "Image Platform". After a long break from television, he joined Nepal Idol Season 2

== Discography ==
- Jeevan Sathi
- Pahilo Maya (feat. The Unity)
- Baato Biraye
- Auta Byatha
