= Shiva Pariyar =

Nepali singer, songwriter

- शिव परियार
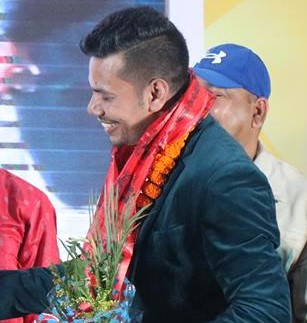
- Shiva Pariyar in 2018
- Born: February 22, 1982 (age 44); Sarlahi, Nepal
- Occupations: Singer; songwriter; Composer
- Years active: 2003–present
- Notable work: Kaha Thiyeu Timi, Sangi, Fewataal Ma Saili, Pilayo Sathile, Kya Daami Bho
- Musical career
- Genres: Semi-classical; popular; sentimental; folk; pop
- Instruments: Vocals; harmonium; tabla; guitar

Shiv Bahadur Pariyar aka Shiva Pariyar (Nepali: शिव परियार), is a Nepali singer, songwriter, and composer known for his contribution in Nepali music. Some of his well-known songs include Dherai Choti Maren Ma Ta,Kaha Thiyeu Timi, Alikati Nazar Timro, Sangi, Kya Dami Bho, Pakera Khako Fal MiTho, Aansuko Artha, Nabheti Nabheti , Dhokebaj Hau Timi, Fulai Ful Dinchhau ki, Fewatalama Saili and Pilayo Sathile. As of 2019, he had released Thirteen studio albums.

== Career ==
Shiva Pariyar was born in Sarlahi, Nepal.

Pariyar incorporates a range of genres from classical music to modern pop, and can also play the Eastern Classical tabla and Piano .

In 2003, he received a gold medal in the "National Contemporary Music Competition", hosted by Radio Nepal. He started musical training from early age and released debut album, Mokshya, in 2005.

Three years after releasing his debut album, Pariyar released back-to-back studio albums called Swayam and Kadambini. In 2010, he released his fourth studio album Kya Daami, followed by the fifth album, Fateko Man, in 2011.

In 2011, Pariyar released his sixth album Pagal. The following year he released two consecutive albums: Kathale Magepachhi and Only for You Mero Sathi. In 2013, he released his ninth studio album "Tadako Sathi", composed by Umesh Subba. His tenth album, Shiva Book was released in 2015.

In May 2023, he featured as one of the six judges of Nepal's first international reality show, Mero Voice Universe.

=== Albums ===
1. Mokshya (2005)
2. Swayam (2008)
3. Kadambini (2009)
4. Kya Daami (2010)
5. Fateko Man (2011)
6. Pagal' (2011)
7. Kathale Magepachhi (2012)
8. Only You Mero Sathi (2012)
9. Tadako Sathi (2013)
10. Shiva Book (2015)
11. Shivalaya (2021)
12. Shivalaya-2(2023)
13. Timi Ra Ma (2023)

== Awards ==
- National Youth Talent Award in Art and Music (2016) – Nepal Government
- Best Male Vocal Performance Award (2017) – Hits FM Music Award
- National Kantipur Music Award (2018) – Radio Kantipur 96.1
- Best Vocal Pop Hits FM Music Award (2019)- Hits FM
- Aadhunik Singer (Male) -National Music Award
- Best Playback Singer Male – 2nd Music Khabar Music Award-2013 (Bato Modera Gayau)
- Best Duet Singing −4th Music Khabar Music Award-2015 (Aafnai Jindagi)
- Best Singer Modern song – 7th Music Khabar Music Award 2018 (Barsau Bho)
