= Nepal 1 =

Indian Nepali-language television channel

NEPAL 1 Television
- Country: India
- Broadcast area: India only (Not carried in Nepal anymore)
- Headquarters: Barakhamba Road, New Delhi, India

Programming
- Picture format: SDTV poor format

Ownership
- Sister channels: APN TV

History
- Launched: Jan 2004

Links
- Website: www.nepal1tv.net

Nepal 1 TV was the first Nepali-language Indian satellite infotainment channel, broadcasting from New Delhi, India. It was very popular between 2004 AD and 2015 AD in Nepal for its breaking news and news programs, a time when there were very few satellite channels in Nepal.

The channel was owned by Indian journalist Nalini Singh. Drawing on her decades of experience in television journalism and running news shows for Doordarshan channels, she implemented a unique style of news presentation on Nepal 1 TV.

Its entertainment programs, talk shows, and soap operas were also highly popular. It consistently led in news coverage compared to the government-owned Nepal Television and Channel Nepal. Later, it gained two more competitors, Kantipur TV and Image Metro, both of which were initially terrestrial channels. Even after they eventually went on satellite, Nepal 1 TV maintained its lead in news, as reflected in its slogan, 'सधैं अगाडि' (Always ahead).

Although its earth station was based in Delhi, the channel targeted its programs towards the citizens of Nepal, and therefore maintained a bureau office in Kathmandu. This Nepal-based office employed Nepalese journalists who gathered news and videos, sending them to India via the internet. Subsequently, a team in Delhi would edit the news and present it from their Delhi studio. Meanwhile, the Kathmandu bureau was also used to record news talk shows and broadcast live talk shows.

The channel remained active until 2015, after which it permanently closed its office in Nepal and began broadcasting news about India in the Hindi language from the same Delhi-based station. This was a clear indication that its Nepali operations were nearing collapse.

Following the closure of its Nepal office and the discontinuation of its Nepali programming, all cable television providers in Nepal suspended the channel. There was no longer any purpose in broadcasting a foreign channel that used the name of a sovereign nation but telecast programs in a foreign language.

Nepal 1 TV was never officially shut down but changed its logo and name from Nepal 1 to N1. It now rebroadcasts the same news shown by another Indian channel, APN TV. Occasionally, the channel airs programs about the Khukuri knife and religious content from Uttarakhand, presented in Nepali spoken with a Hindi accent.
