= Anju Panta =

Nepali singer

Anju Panta अन्जु पन्त
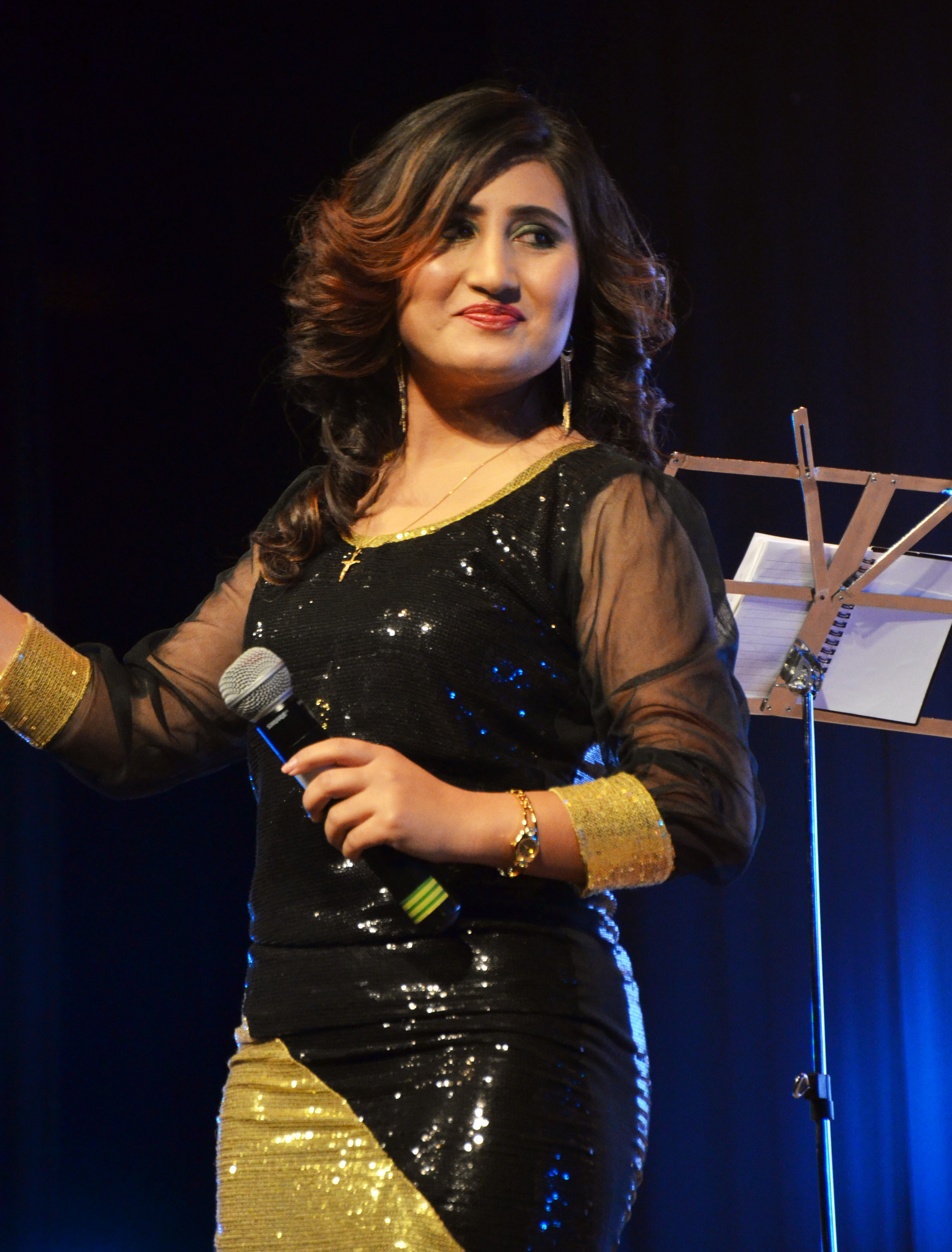
- Panta performing in Sydney in 2014

Background information
- Born: Terhthum District, Nepal
- Occupation: Singer
- Years active: 1998–present
- Label: Music Nepal
- Website: anjupanta.org

Anju Panta (Nepali: अन्जु पन्त) is a Nepalese ghazals and playback singer. She sang popular songs including the title song of Na birse Timilai na Paye Timilai and Ma Timi Bina Marihaalchhu, Bhun bhun bolyo bhamara of Saput, Dil yo mero dil in Kismat, and Sustari sustari mannma for Darr. Panta sang for more than 300 films and more than 7000 Nepalese songs in duets and solos.

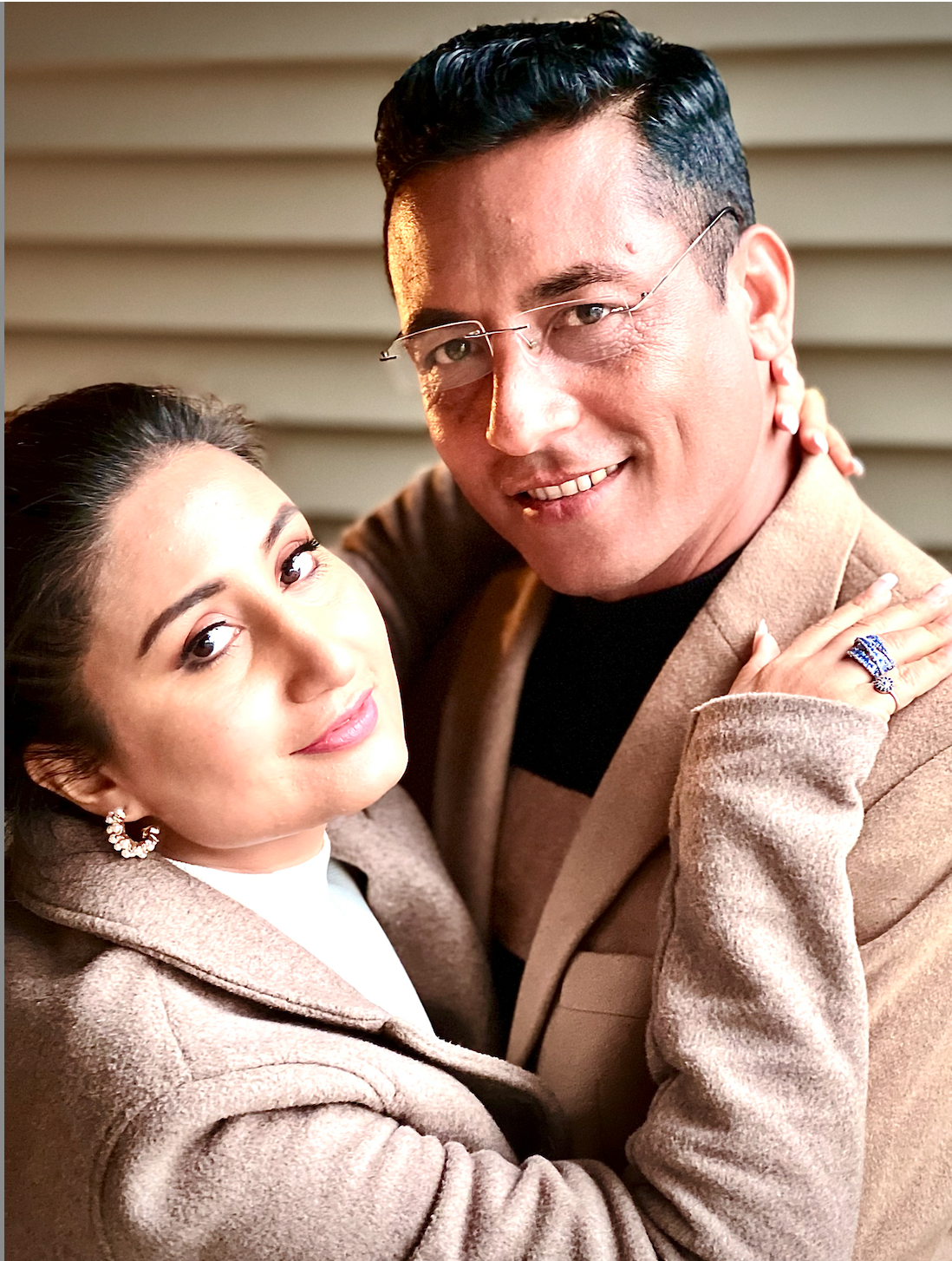
Anju Panta and her husband Thir Koirala

In May 2023, she featured as one of the six judges of Nepal's first international reality show, Mero Voice Universe.

== Albums ==
- Dute: Gaatha, Koshe Dhunga, Man Uddyo, Samyog with (Jagit Singh)
- single: "Kampan, Ma Sanga Nahuda"
- Collections: Kiran, Anurag, Anjuli, Sarathi, Kasam, kina kina, Divorce, sadhana, Sarod, Sameep, Timro khusi, samjhauta, Nirasha, Gopya kura, maya pirati hoina, haar Kasur, Timro maan, Timilainai maya garxu, Amar preem 2, Anamol, Kinara, nayan, Ausadhi, Sharadda, Antar Dhara, meri Priya...more than 5 thousand songs (including albums and films)
- Various TV serials and advertisements
- Over 6000 songs

== Hindu song controversy ==
She was widely criticized on Nepalese social media after news reports on 5 September 2014 claimed that she refused to sing a festival greeting song because Hindu deities were mentioned in the lyrics. Later she denied the allegation saying she had been sick. In 2014 she converted to Christianity from Hinduism.

== Awards ==
In December 2009, at the 13th Close Up Hits FM Music Award function, she collected most of the titles, including Best Female Vocal Performance and Best Record of the Year for "Nabirse Timilai", her biggest hit to date.

- Gold medal in all Nepal singing Competition organized by Radio Nepal (2054 B.S.)
- Gold medal in Sanatan Dharma Bhajan Competition
- First position in Dharma Sewa Bhajan (2056 B.S.)
- Uttara Badri Samman (2055 B.S.)
- Naba Nari Samman (2069 B.S.)
- Nepal Kalakar Samman (2065 B.S.)
- Radio Resunga Samman (2066 B.S.)
- Christian Arts Associations Nepal (CAAN Samman 2070 B.S.)
- Chhinnalata Samman (2066 B.S.)
- Rastriya Bhibhuti Samman (2070 B.S.)
- Mahendra Nagar Samman (2066 B.S.)
- Kalakar Samrakshan Manch Samman Patra (2066 B.S.)
- Hits FM Music Award for the best vocal collaboration in 2009-2009-2010-2013 (duet) B.S.
- Image FM Award for the Best Vocal in (2063 B.S.)
- A grade singer in Radio Nepal
- Naray Gopal Award (2069 B.S.)
- Best Female Award from kantipuf FM (2064-2065-2066 B.S.)
- NEFTA KTV Film Award (2066 B.S.)
- Image FM Award for Best Female Vocal (2065-2066 B.S.)
- Excellence Play Back Singer Award Nepal Film development Board (2065-2066 B.S.)
- Award From Kantipur TV (2065-2066 B.S.)
- Award From Kalika FM (2066-2067 B.S.)
- Cine Award (2066 B.S.)
- Annapurna FM Award (2064-2065-2066 B.S.)
- Box Office Film Award (2067 B.S.)
- Music Nepal Popularity Award (2069 B.S.)
- Bindabasini Award (2067 B.S.)
