= Indira Joshi (singer) =

Nepalese singer and model

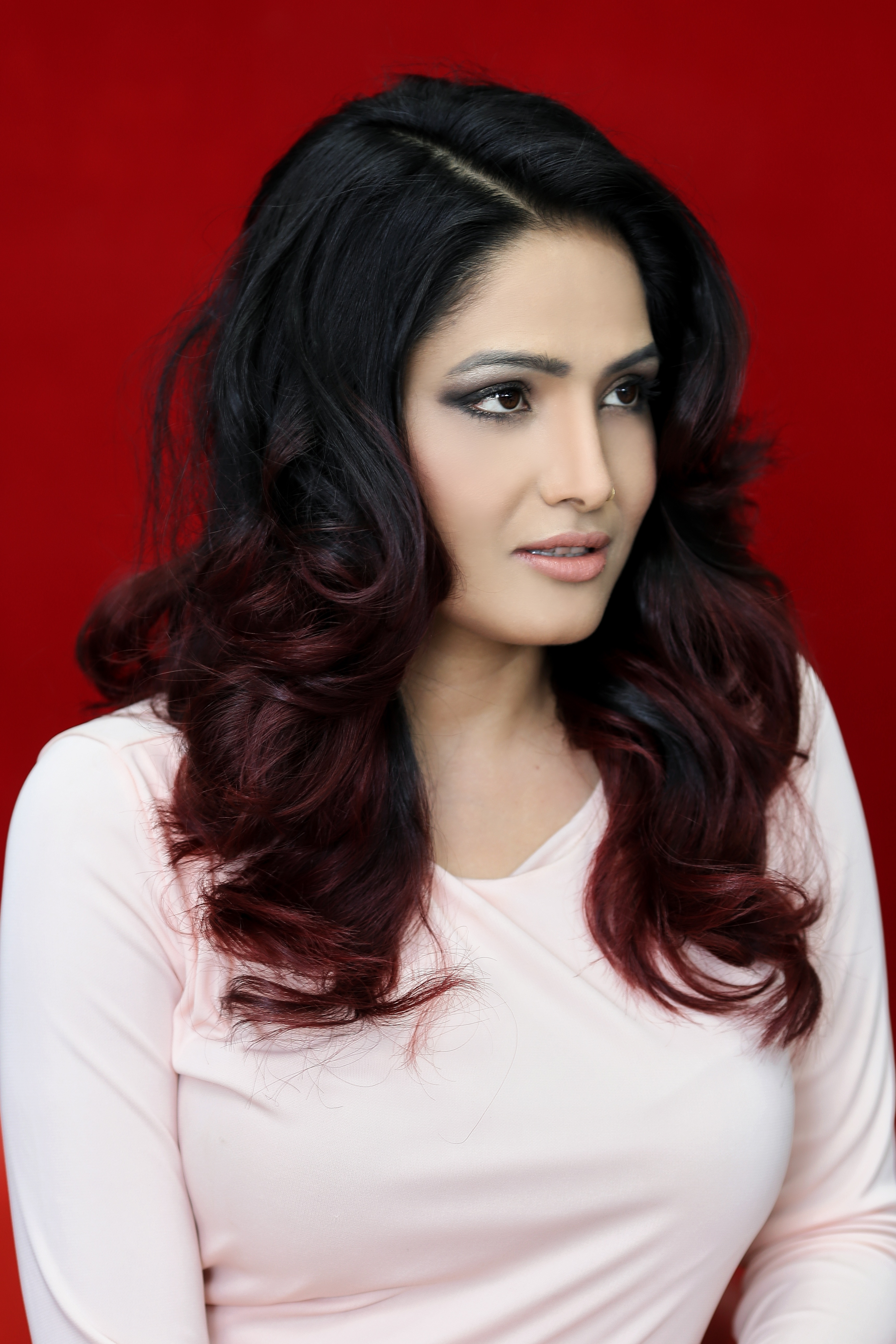
Joshi in 2017

Indira Joshi (Nepali: इन्दिरा जोशी) is a Nepalese singer and has been a judge on Nepal Idol, and for Miss Universe Nepal 2021.

Her hit songs have included "Udhreko Choli" and "Rato Ghanghara". She was one of 365 Nepalese singers who made a record-breaking joint recording of the song "Melancholy" in 2017.

In September 2019, she made a "special appearance" as the guest in episode 47, series 1, of Mundre Ko Comedy Club on Nepal Television.
