= Channel Nepal =

Nepali satellite television channel

Channel Nepal is a Nepali television channel which was the country's first satellite TV channel. Jamim Shah, a media entrepreneur, owned the channel until his 2010 murder. The channel airs entertainment, information and current affairs programs.

The station was temporarily banned in 2000 after falsely attributing anti-Nepal comments to Indian actor Hrithik Roshan, sparking riots which left four people dead and 180 people injured in Nepal.
