= Rajan Ishan =

Nepali singer-songwriter and actor

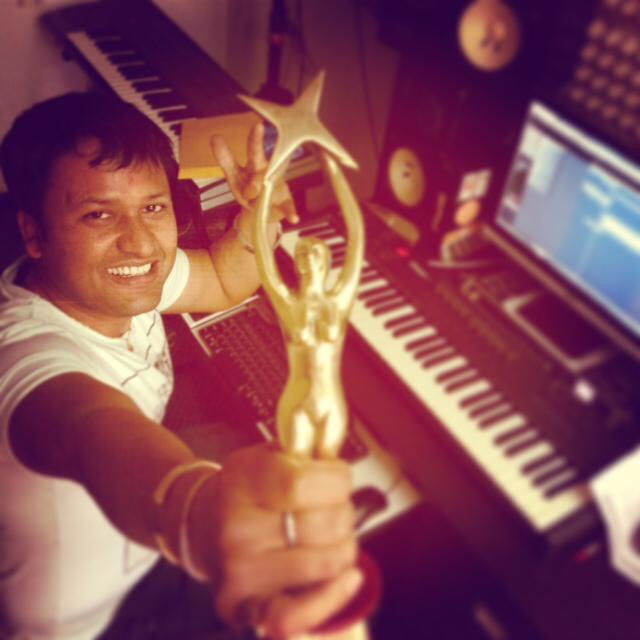
- Award received in 2015
- Born: 29 September 1978; Lalitpur
- Other names: Rajan Rana
- Occupations: Singer, lyricist, composer, arranger, actor
- Known for: Rohini

Rajan Ishan (Nepali: राजन ईशान, born September 29, 1978) is a Nepali singer-songwriter and actor. He has made major contributions to the Nepali music and film industry.

He started his music career in 1996 and became popular after the release of Baashma chaina mero mann. "Ajhai Yaad Chha", the first single from his latest album, was played on Radio Kantipur. and became highest paid music arranger and composer in Nepal. Ishan's first movie was Karkash, followed by Awaran, 2 Rupaiyan and Rudrapriya.

Ishan was one of the mentor judges in the third series of the popular Nepali reality show Nepali Tara, along with music directors and singers.

== Education ==
Rajan did his schooling in Nepal and India. After completing his higher level education, he joined Sadhana Kala Kendra, a music school in Kathmandu, Nepal.

== Personal life ==
He was born and brought up in Kathmandu, Nepal. He lived in India as a teenager.

== Professional career ==
Ishan's debut song, "Baash maa chhaina mero mann" ("My heart is not in my control"), became a hit in the 1990s.

Ishan is also a music composer and lyricist.

He began his acting career with the film Karkash in 2013. He then acted in "Awaran" in 2014, "2 Rupaiyan" and "Rudrapriya" in 2017.
