= Pasikot =

Pasikot पासिकोट
- Village
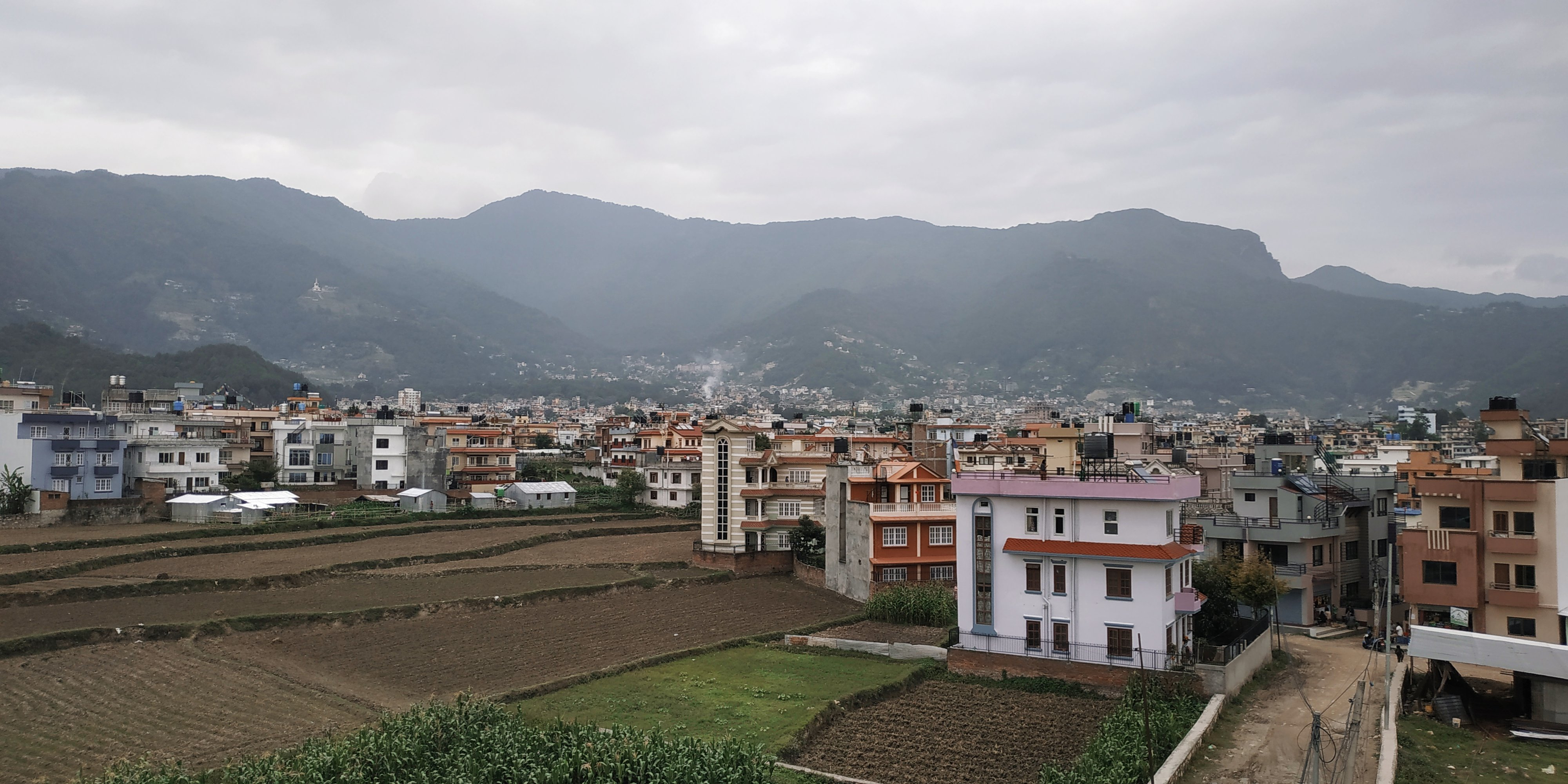

- Location in Nepal
- Coordinates: 27°46′N 85°22′E
- Country: Nepal
- Province: Bagmati Province
- District: Kathmandu District

Population
  - Ethnicities: Newar Bahun Chhetri Tamang Magar
  - Religions: Hindu Buddhist
- Time zone: UTC+5:45 (NST)

Pasikot, situated at Budhanilkantha Municipality, is a village in Budhanilkantha in Kathmandu District in Bagmati Province before being incorporated into the city of Budhanilkantha (along with Chapali Bhadrakali, Mahankal, Bishnu, Chunikhel and Kapan) in Nepal. At the time of the 2011 Nepal census it had a population of 15,421.

== Gallery ==
Clear Scene in all directions
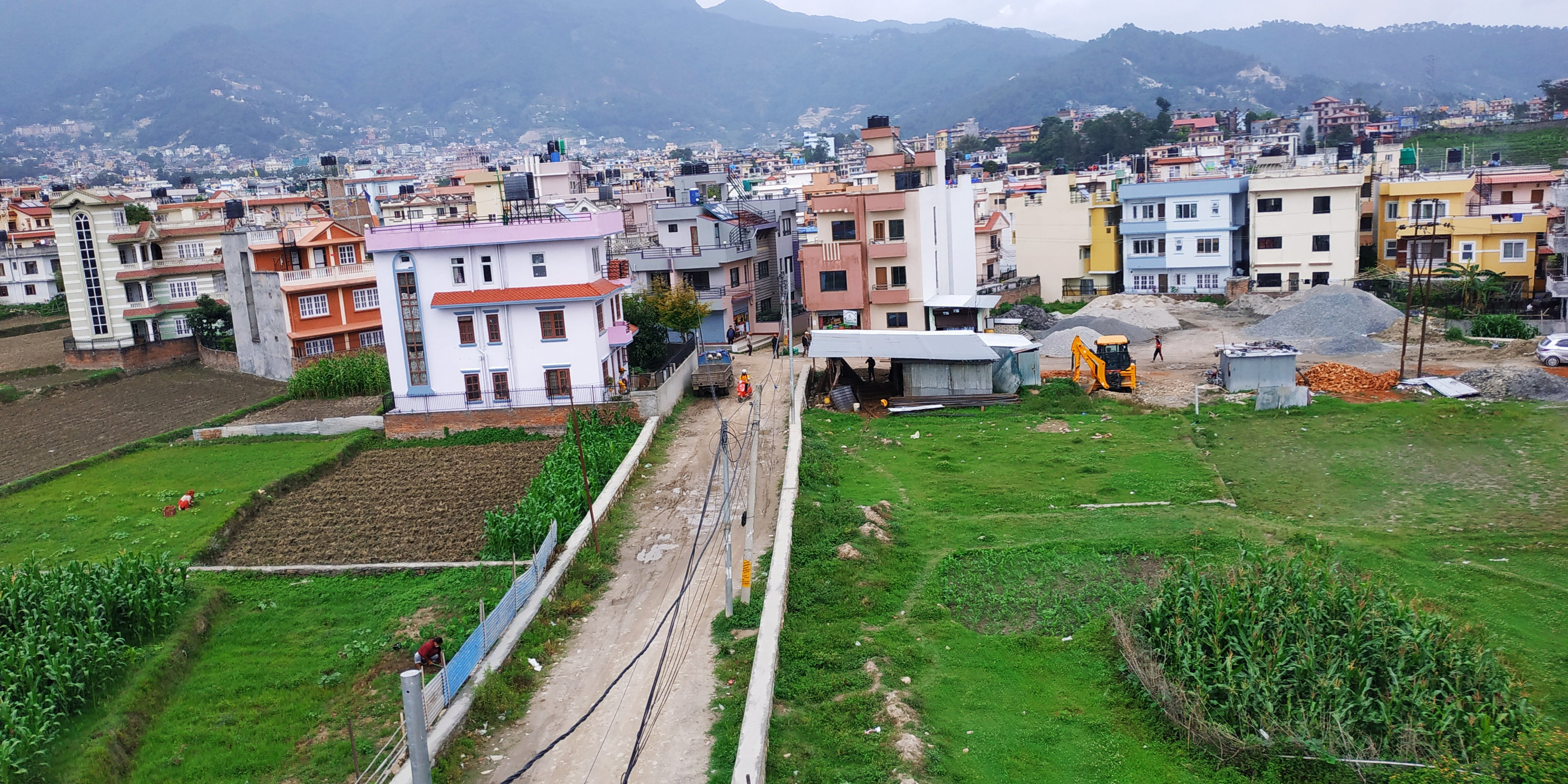
Clear view of Pasikot in the East

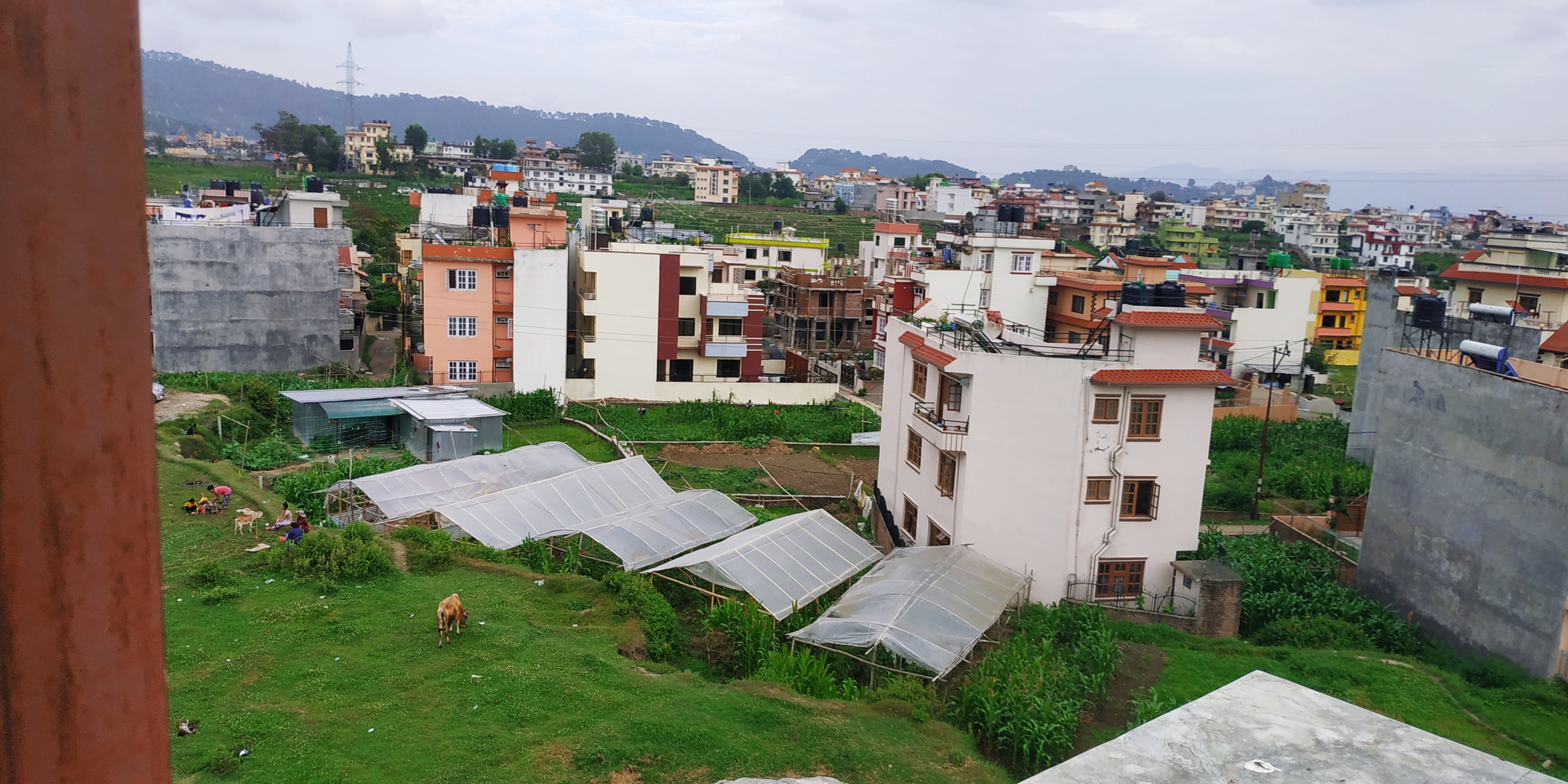
Clear view of Pasikot in the South-East

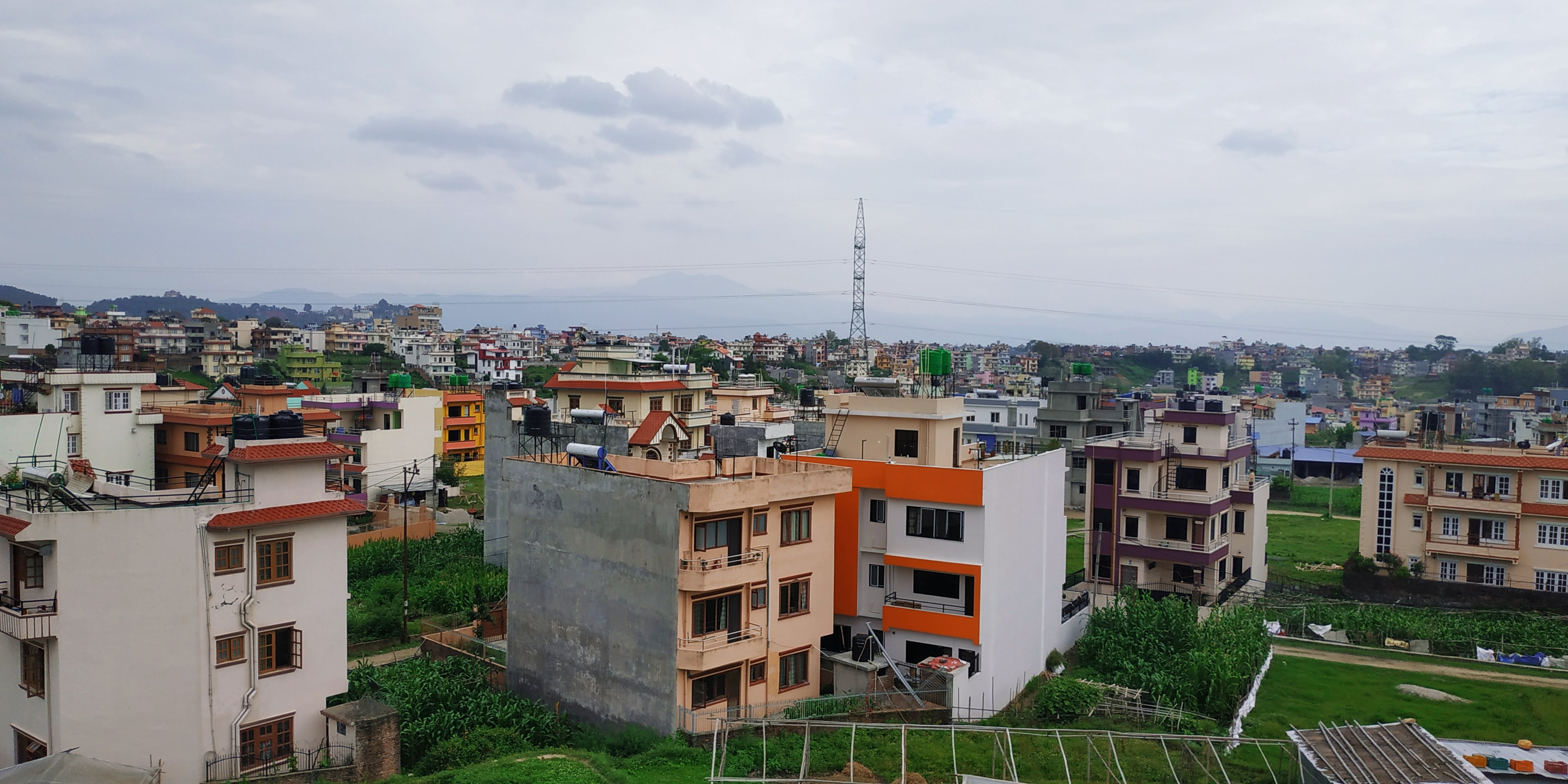
Clear view of Pasikot in the South

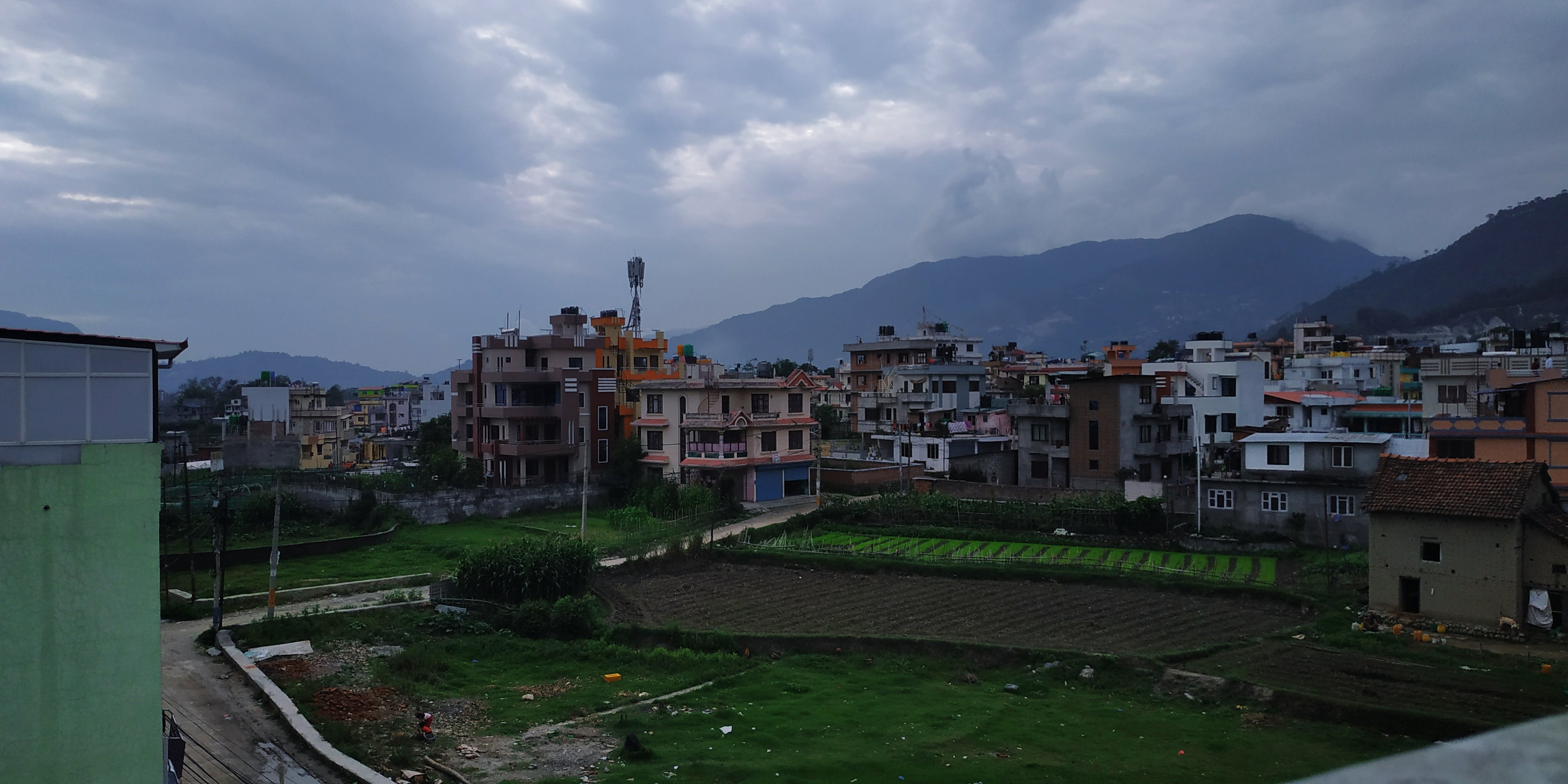
Clear view of Pasikot in the North-West

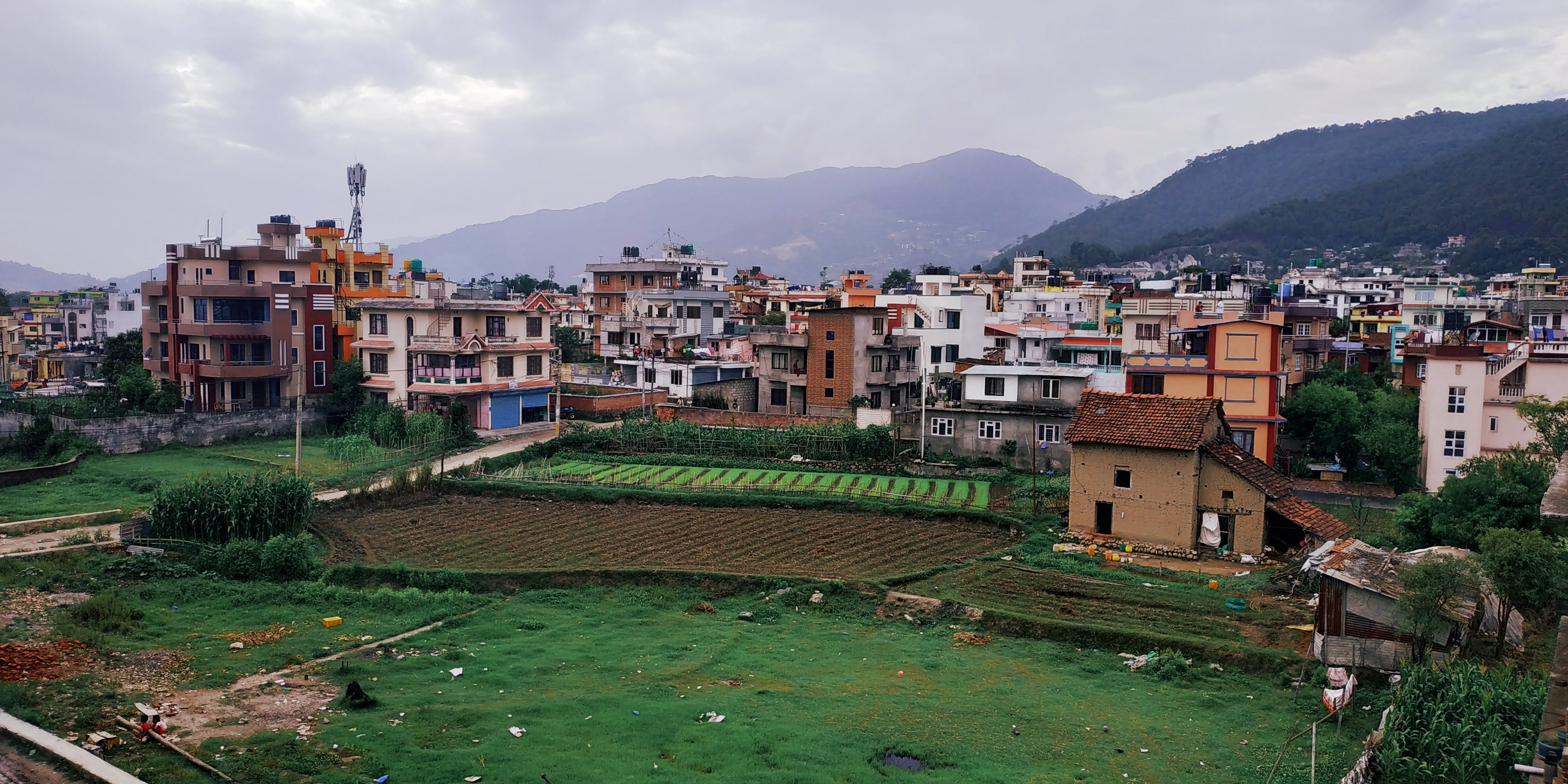
Clear view of Pasikot in the North-East

== See also ==
- Budhanilkantha
- Shivapuri Nagarjun National Park
