= Miss Universe Nepal 2026 =

10th Miss Universe Nepal Beauty Pageant

- Date: 27 September, 2026
- Hosts: Sophiya Bhujel; Sudit Shrestha; Jeevan Tamang
- Theme: Perfect As You Are
- Venue: The Soaltee, Kathmandu
- Broadcaster: Kantipur Television
- Producer: Global Glamour Venture Pvt. Ltd.
- Owner: Sangita Puri
- Sponsor: Deepal; X-Age; KAJI Productions; Truederma Skincare; Big Bell Entertainment
- Entrants: 106
- Placements: 14
- Winner: Prayashna Gurung; Bhairahawa
- Winner qualifies for: Miss Universe 2027
- Social Impact Leader: Aditi Shrestha; Sindhuli

Deepal Miss Universe Nepal 2026 (MUN 2026) was the 10th edition of the pageant held on 27 September, 2026 at The Soaltee, Kathmandu. Prayashna Gurung from Bhairahawa won the pageant and will enter Miss Universe 2027.

The event was livestreamed by Kantipur Television, nationally on satellite TV and internationally on Kantiupr TV HD (YouTube).

== Background ==
Global Glamour Venture opened the applications for 10th Miss Universe Nepal on Khalti App and website in late April, 2026. A press meet was held on July 17, 2026 to announce the official commencement of the pageant. The final event was scheduled for September 27, 2026.The Soaltee, Kathmandu hosted the final event.

Prashant Tamrakar was declared the official choreographer for the pageant. Deepal, a prominent electric vehicle brand distributed by Changan, was announced as the title sponsor. X-Age Nepal and True Derma Skincare were also revealed as the major sponsors.

Monic Peréz, Miss Universe Puerto Rico 2013 and Miss Universe 2013- Top 16 was announced as official mentor for the delegates of MUN 2026.

Major Events
Event	Date	Venue
Press Meet	17 July 2026	The Soaltee Kathmandu
Audition	18 July 2026	Hotel Soaltee Westend, Itahari
Influencer Meetup	27 July 2026	The Soaltee, Kathmandu
Grand Audition	6 August 2026	The Soaltee, Kathmandu
Sash Ceremony	10 August 2026	The Soaltee, Kathmandu
Heritage Walk	2 September 2026	Bhaktapur Durbar Square
MUN Runway	8 September 2026	The Soaltee, Kathmandu
Preliminary Swimsuit Competition	15 September 2026	The Soaltee, Kathmandu
Preliminary Interview	25 September 2026	The Soaltee, Kathmandu
Grand Finale	27 September 2026	The Soaltee, Kathmandu

== Team ==
The Team of Global Glamour Venture for MUN 2026,

1. Sangita Puri, National Director
2. Alok Chettri (Nabin KC), Managing Director
3. Sabi Puri, CEO/President
4. Alexander Gonzalez, International Choreographer and Image Consultant
5. Prashant Tamrakar, Choreographer
6. Monic Pérez, Miss Universe 2013 (Top 16), Mentor for MUN 2026.
7. Sushant Kaji Shrestha, founder of KAJI Production
8. Jeevan Tamang, media influencer, host for auditions and preliminary events.

== Pageant ==
=== Selection of participants ===
The applicants were instructed to register via Khalti app and website. Applications were open to females and those individuals who identify as women, aged 18 and above; with no restriction on height, body type and other physical criteria. Pregnant women, mothers, married or divorced individuals were also allowed to enter the contest as per guidelines of MUO. Non Resident Nepali women were also able to register in MUN 2026.

=== Auditions ===
Audition was held on 18 July 2026 in Itahari, judged by runners up of MUN 2025, Aarohi Basnet and Jyoti Thapa.

Grand Audition was held on 6 August 2026 in Kathmandu; judged by Sanya Adhikari, Monic Perez, Pageant Mentor Prashant Tamrakar, National Director Sangita Puri and Fashion Photographer Anjil Maskey.

The total of 106 entrants were reduced to placement of 14 semifinalists.

=== Preliminary Phase ===
The 14 semi-finalists determined from audition were revealed to public in a Sash Ceremony. Then they went to a month long grooming session where they are trained on walk, etiquette, stage presence, communication and advocacy projects. The semifinalists engaged in various public interaction events and sponsor events. Prior to the grand finals, semifinalists performed in preliminary contest: runway challenge, swimsuit round and closed door interviews.

Jeevan Tamang, social media influencer; hosted all events from auditions to preliminary shows.

- MUN Runway 2026: On 8 September 2026, the event of 'MUN Runway' was organized where contestants showcased ramp-walk in 4 rounds namely; Cocktail Dress, Evening Gown, Semi-Formal and Traditional rounds. Also, Sanya Adhikari walked the runway as the reigning winner wearing official sash and MUN Crown.
- Preliminary Swimsuit Competition 2026: On 15 September 2026, the contestants performed swimsuit walk at The Soaltee Kathmandu, judged by Sanya Adhikari and Monic Pérez. The performances were scored to determine the placements on grand finale. The event was livestreamed by Kantipur Television.
- Preliminary Interview: The Top 14 semifinalists were interviewed by judges on their advocacy, contemporary matters and personality. The scores obtained on interviews also determined placements on grand finale.

=== Grand Finale ===
==== Format ====
At the grand finale, Top 14 performed in introduction round, swimsuit and cocktail dress round. Then Top 10 was selected based on preliminary scores, where two highest voted contestants and a Social Impact Leader winner entered direclty to Top 10. Then, top 10 performed in evening gown & speech round. Based on scores of evening gown & speech round, Top 5 was announced. Top 5 faced the final Q/A round, based on which the winner of the contest was crowned as The Miss Universe Nepal.

==== Presenters ====
Sophiya Bhujel, Miss Universe Nepal 2022 and Sudit Shrestha, Manhunt International Nepal 2013 Runner Up & Television personality; were announced the hosts/presenters for final event at The Soaltee Kathmandu.

==== Judges ====
- Monic Perez, Miss Universe Puerto Rico 2013, Miss Universe 2013 (Top 16)
- Sushant Murarka, skincare expert, founder of TrueDerma Skincare.
- Tico Rega, Colombian dance choreograpger, stage presence expert, beauty pageant trainer.
- Tulika Agrawal, businesswoman, director of MAW Enterprises and Foundation.
- Avinash Deshmukh, luxury-hospitality expert and manager.
- Nikhil Aanand, National Director of Miss Universe India 2026.

==== Guests ====
- Celina Jaitly, actor and Miss Universe 2001 Runner Up.
- Manika Vishwakarma, Miss Universe India 2025.

== Results ==
=== Grand Finale ===
Grand Finale Placements
Placement	Contestant	International Placement
Miss Universe Nepal 2026	Bhairahawa- Prayashna Gurung ★	Miss Universe 2027- TBA
TOP 5	Jhapa- Binita Oli	
TOP 5	Pokhara- Ambika Rana	
TOP 5	Kavreplanchowk- Shraddha Adhikari	
TOP 5	Sindhuli- Aditi Shrestha ●	
Top 10	Arghakhanchi- Shristi Bhusal ★	
Top 10	Parsa-Projita Shrestha	
Top 10	Nepalgunj- Sweksha Lakhe	
Top 10	Kapilvastu- Deepika Yogi	
Top 10	Ramechhap- Krijan Sodari	

(★): Top 2 of Miss Popular Choice got direct entry to Top 10.

(●): The candidate won Social Impact Leader Award and directly entered Top 10.

=== Subtitles ===
MUN 2026 Subtitles
Subtitle	Winner
Miss Popular Choice	Bhairahawa- Prayshna Gurung
Truederma Best Skin	Bhairahawa- Prayshna Gurung
MUN Runway Diva	Kavrepalanchowk- Shraddha Adhikari
Miss Free and Fearless	Kavrepalanchowk- Shraddha Adhikari
Miss Multimdeia	Dang- Hima Basnet
Miss Photogenic	Sindhuli- Aditi Shrestha
Miss Social Impact Leader	Sindhuli- Aditi Shrestha
Miss Confident	Jhapa- Binita Oli
Miss Congeniality	Jhapa- Binita Oli
Face of Shagoon Jewellers	Jhapa- Binita Oli

== Contestants ==
=== Top 14 Contestants ===
Contestant Details
MUN No.	Representing	Contestant	प्रतियोगी	Advocacy	Past Experience	Ref.
1	Sindhuli	Aditi Shrestha	अदिति श्रेष्ठ	Awareness for visible and invisible challenges to foster empathy and inclusion.	Miss Supranational Nepal 2024 (Top 30)	
2	Kavrepalanchowk	Shraddha Adhikari	श्रद्धा अधिकारी	Women empowerment, child welfare, healthcare access and inclusivity.	Miss Nepal 2026 (Top 12); Miss Supranational Nepal 2024 (Top 10)	
3.	Parsa	Projita Shrestha	प्रोजिता श्रेष्ठ	Women's mental health and child rights for dignified future.	Miss Makwanpur 2021	
4	Jhapa	Binita Oli	विनिता ओली	Promotion of mental well being and human connections.		
5	Kapilvastu	Deepika Yogi	दीपिका योगी	Fostering positive mindset, learning and professional empowerment.		
6	Saptari	Hrishika Chaudhary	हृषिका चौधरी	Youth empowerment and policy inclusion for nation.		
7	Siraha	Rinku Rasaili	रिङ्कु रसाइली	Women empowerment for financial independence and work against domestic violence.		
8	Morang	Etusha Limbu	इतुशा लिम्बु	Focus on digital skills, youth mentroship and entrepreneurship for students.		
9	Ramechhap	Krizan Sodari	कृजन सोडारी	Youth confidence and empowerment through build up of self confidence.		
10	Bhairahawa/ UK	Prayashna Gurung	प्रायश्ना गुरुङ	Skill based learning, financial literacy and entrepreneurship for women's future.		
11	Pokhara	Ambika Rana	अम्बिका राणा	Health care, education and financial opportunities for underprivileged families.	Miss Grand Nepal 2020; Miss Nepal 2024 (Top 13)	
12	Dang/ Kathmandu	Hima Basnet	हिमा बस्नेत	Focus on equity for young generation regardless of gender or backgrounds.		
13	Arghakhanchi	Shrishti Bhusal	सृष्टि भुसाल	Cyber hygiene and awareness for online safety and technological empowerment.		
14	Nepalgunj	Sweksha Lakhe	स्वेच्छा लाखे	Women's employment and economic empowerment for sustainable career and better future.		

=== Miss Popular Choice ===
Voting Leader Board
Rank	Reveal 1	Reveal 2	Reveal 3	Reveal 4	Reveal 5	Reveal 6	Final Reveal
1	Etusha Limbu	Prayashna Gurung	Etusha Limbu	Ambika Rana	Prayashna Gurung	Prayashna Gurung	Prayashna Gurung ★
2	Shristi Bhusal	Etusha Limbu	Prayashna Gurung	Etusha Limbu	Etusha Limbu	Etusha Limbu	Shristi Bhusal ★
3	Prayashna Gurung	Shristi Bhusal	Ambika Rana	Prayashna Gurung	Ambika Rana	Shristi Bhusal	Etusha Limbu
4	Binita Oli	Binita Oli	Shristi Bhusal	Shristi Bhusal	Sweksha Lakhe	Ambika Rana	Ambika Rana
5	Sweksha Lakhe	Ambika Rana	Binita Oli	Sweksha Lakhe	Aditi Shrestha	Binita Oli	Shraddha Adhikari
6	Rinku Rasaili	Sweksha Lakhe	Sweksha Lakhe	Aditi Shrestha	Shristi Bhusal	Shraddha Adhikari	Projita Shrestha
7	Projita Shrestha	Shraddha Adhikari	Aditi Shrestha	Binita Oli	Binita Oli	Sweksha Lakhe	Binita Oli
8	Hima Basnet	Aditi Shrestha	Shraddha Adhikari	Shraddha Adhikari	Rinku Rasaili	Aditi Shrestha	Sweksha Lakhe
9	Aditi Shrestha	Rinku Rasaili	Projita Shrestha	Projita Shrestha	Shraddha Adhikari	Projita Shrestha	Aditi Shrestha
10	Ambika Rana	Projita Shrestha	Rinku Rasaili	Rinku Rasaili	Projita Shrestha	Hima Basnet	Rinku Rasaili

(★): Top 2 of Miss Popular Choice got direct entry to Top 10 on final show.
