= Miss Universe Nepal 2024 =

8th edition of the Miss Universe Nepal beauty pageant

- Date: 11 September 2024
- Hosts: Malvika Subba; Luis Portelles
- Theme: "As Perfect As You Are"
- Venue: Godavari Sunrise Convention Center
- Broadcaster: AP1 HD
- Director: Sangita Puri (National Director); Alok Chettri (Managing Director)
- Producer: Global Glamour Venture P.Ltd.
- Sponsor: Nepal Tourism Board (Tourism Partner); Miss Universe Skin Care (Skin Care Partner)
- Entrants: 60
- Placements: 22
- Winner: Sampada Ghimire (Nepal) Bhaktapur
- Friendship: (Nepal) Jhapa; Renata Kattel
- Miss Multimedia: (Nepal) Budhanilkantha; Asmi Dhakal

Miss Universe Nepal 2024 (MUN 2024), was the 8th edition of Miss Universe Nepal pageant. Sampada Ghimire of Bhaktapur won the contest and represented Nepal at Miss Universe 2024 in Mexico.

The event was nationally live streamed by AP1 HD on television and internationally via Miss Universe Youtube Channel.

== Background ==
=== Press Meet ===
On 11 January 2024, Global Glamour Venture organized a press conference announcing the change of organizers of Miss Universe Nepal. On 7-June-2024, a promotional video was released starring Miss Universe Nepal 2022 Sophiya Bhujel for spreading the message of MUN's motto, "Perfect As You Are". On July-10-2024, MUN made official announcement of Top 60 Candidates on their respective emails.

The Team of Global Glamour Venture for MUN 2024-

1. Sangita Puri, National Director
2. Alok Chettri (Nabin KC), Managing Director
3. Sabi Puri, CEO/President
4. Alexander Gonzalez, International Choreographer and Image Constant
5. Dikpal Karki, National Choreographer
6. Indira Joshi, renowned singer, Mentor
7. Ranjit Raj Acharya, Mentor
8. Luis Portelles, Pageant analyst, Content creator, Host at Preliminary and Final Show
9. Malvika Subba, Miss World Nepal 2002, Host at Final Show
10. Sugarika KC, Miss World Nepal 2005, Host at Press Conferences and Sash Ceremony

=== Major Events ===
Date	Event	Venue
14 May 2024	Press Meet	The Soaltee, Kathmandu
29 July 2024	Auditions	Hilton Hotel, Kathmandu
11 August 2024	Sash Ceremony	Hilton Hotel, Kathmandu
31 August 2024	Swimsuit Competition	Hilton Hotel, Kathmandu
31 August 2024	Crown Unveiling	Hilton Hotel, Kathmandu
11 September 2024	Grand Finale	Godavari Sunrise Convention Center, Lalitpur

The Star of The Universe Crown

On August 31, 2024 at the preliminary show, a new crown called the "Star of The Universe" was unveiled by Miss Universe 2023 Shyennis Palacios. The crown was crafted by Ashmi Jewellers Global.

The crown features a star that signifies eternity and the glory of Miss Universe. The crown made of white gold and decorated with diamonds and gemstones. Inspired by the night sky and Nepal's heritage, which is said to symbolize brilliance and empowerment.

== Pageant Format ==
Registration Phase

On 11 May 2024 a second press conference was made to announce the opening of registration for the selection of 8th Miss Universe Nepal. The announcement was made in the presence of Miss Universe Nepal 2021- Sujita Basnet. Several media houses covered the event in a huge scale.

The registrations initially opened from 15 May 2024 to June 15, 2024, via Khalti app and Miss Universe Nepal website.

Eligibility Criteria

Any Nepali/Non-Resident-Nepali (NRN) who identifies as female aged 18 and above is allowed to participate. There is no criteria on body type and physical measurements. The competition is open to everyone irrespective of their marital status (unmarried/ married/ divorced). Even pregnant women can participate as per the guidelines of Miss Universe. Minimum academic requirement is 10+2/equivalent or above.

Competition Phase

Out of many online applications for the 8th Miss Universe Nepal, Top 60 applicants were shortlisted as Qualifiers and notified via emails. The Qualifiers are then, eligible to go on further screening process. The top 60 qualifiers also receive 2-days-training with International Choreographer Mr. Alexander Gonzalez. The screening takes the Top 32 contestants to next round. The top 32 contestants are subjected to orientation and then sash ceremonial introduction round. After that they undergo rigorous trainings regarding the walk, speech and advocacy. During the process Top 32 is reduced to Top 22 based on internal contests. Now the Top 22 are required to perform in Swimsuit Round, Interview round and Advocacy Presentation at the preliminary competition to advance to the grand final placements. At the finals, Top 22 is reduced to Top 15 based on preliminary competition. Later, the top 15 reduces to Top 10, based on swimsuit round and advocacy presentation scores. After that, Top 5 is announced based on all performances of preliminary and on-stage interview round, evening gown round. Based on the final Q/A and performance in the entire pageant, a contestant from Top 5 is crowned as winner.

== Results ==
=== Grand Finale Placements ===
Final results	Contestant	International pageant	International Results
Miss Universe Nepal 2024 (Winner)	(Nepal) Bhaktapur - Sampada Ghimire	Miss Universe 2024	Unplaced
1st runner-up	(Nepal) Lalitpur - Smriti Singh		
2nd runner-up	Kathmandu / United Arab Emirates - Akshita Chhetri		
3rd runner-up	(Nepal) Lalitpur - Karren Eva Murray		
4th runner-up	(Nepal) Doti - Sujal Bam		
Top 10	(Nepal) Budhanilkantha - Niyukti Arjal		
Top 10	(Nepal) Hetauda - Manisha Pariyar		
Top 10	Kathmandu - Ayusha Karki		
Top 10	(Nepal) Pokhara / United Kingdom - Nitu Pun		
Top 10	(Nepal) Syangja - Shreeyanka Thapa		
Top 15	(Nepal) Budhanilkantha - Asmi Dhakal		
Top 15	(Nepal) Hetauda - Khushi Dutraj		
Top 15	(Nepal) Janakpur - Shivani Karna		
Top 15	(Nepal) Jhapa - Renata Kattel		
Top 15	(Nepal) Pokhara - Puja Bastola		

(§): The candidate won the Miss Popular Choice Award and got direct entry into Top 5.
(฿): The candidate won the Voice for Change Award and got direct entry into Top 10 Finalists.

=== Subtitles ===
Subtitles	Contestant
Hilton Miss Elegance	(Nepal) Lalitpur - Karren Eva Murray
TVS Miss Smart	(Nepal) Lalitpur - Smriti Singh
WOW Magazine Miss Free and Fearless	(Nepal) Salyan - Samriddhi KC
Global IME Miss Eco Friendly	(Nepal) Syangja - Shreeyanka Thapa
d'Cosmo Nepal Most Beautiful Skin	(Nepal) Lalitpur - Karren Eva Murray
X-Age Miss Photogenic	(Nepal) Lalitpur - Smriti Singh
Miss Multimedia	(Nepal) Budhanilkantha - Asmi Dhakal
Miss Friendship	(Nepal) Jhapa - Renata Kattel
Voice for Change	(Nepal) Hetauda - Manisha Pariyar
Miss Popular Choice	(Nepal) Doti - Sujal Bam

== Contestants ==
Top 22 Contestants

Following group of Top 22 contestants entered the Preliminary Competition and the Grand Finale.

Miss Universe Nepal 2024 "Top 22"
Number	Candidate		Hometown
Number	Romanized name	Nepali name	Hometown
1	Sampada Ghimire	सम्पदा घिमिरे	(Nepal) Bhaktapur
2	Shreeyanka Thapa	श्रीयंका थापा	(Nepal) Syangja
3	Anushka Wasthi	अनुष्का वस्थी	(Nepal) Chitwan
4	Sujal Bam	सुजल बम	(Nepal) Doti
5	Neha Chaudhary	नेहा चौधरी	(Nepal) Kalaiya
6	Manisha Pariyar	मनिषा परियार	(Nepal) Hetauda
7	Smriti Singh	स्मृति सिंह	(Nepal) Lalitpur
8	Alina Gurung	एलिना गुरुङ	(Nepal) Dolakha
9	Renata Kattel	रेनता कट्टेल	(Nepal) Jhapa
10	Tulasha Nepal	तुलसा नेपाल	(Nepal) Rukum
11	Niyukti Arjal	नियुक्ती अर्जेल	(Nepal) Budhanilkantha
12	Puja Bastola	पुजा बास्तोला	(Nepal) Pokhara
13	Khushi Dutraj	खुसी दतराज	(Nepal) Hetauda
14	Ayusha Karki	आयुषा कार्की	Kathmandu
15	Asmi Dhakal	अस्मी ढकाल	(Nepal) Budhanilkantha
16	Shivani Karna	शिवानी कर्ण	(Nepal) Janakpur
17	Gajal Karn	गजल कर्ण	(Nepal) Janakpur
18	Karren Eva Murray	क्यारेन ईवा मर्रे	(Nepal) Lalitpur
19	Akshita Chhetri	अक्षिता क्षेत्री	Kathmandu / United Arab Emirates
20	Nitu Pun	नितु पुन	(Nepal) Pokhara / United Kingdom
21	Tashi Gurung	तशी गुरुङ	(Nepal) Mustang
22	Samriddhi KC	समृद्धि के.सी	(Nepal) Salyan

Top 32 Contestants

Following group of contestants finished at Top 32 before the Preliminary Show.

Remaining Group that makes "Top 32"
Audition Number	Candidate		Hometown
Audition Number	Romanized name	Nepali name	Hometown
1002	Choten Phuntso	छोटेन फुञ्चो	(Nepal) Lalitpur
1003	Supriya Thapa	सुप्रिया थापा	(Nepal) Kathmandu
1012	Nilam Dhungana	निलम ढुंगाना	(Nepal) Bardibas
1026	Shreya Manandhar	श्रेया मानन्धर	(Nepal) Kathmandu
1027	Hritisha Manandhar	ऋतिषा मानन्धर	(Nepal) Kathmandu
1032	Suprava Khatri	सुप्रवा खत्री	(Nepal) Bhaktapur
1034	Nilisha Shahi Thakuri	निलिशा शाही ठकुरी	(Nepal) Kathmandu
1042	Prakrity Phuyal	प्रकृति फुयाँल	(Nepal) Biratnagar
1043	Astha Guragain	आस्था गुरागाईं	(Nepal) Kathmandu

== Television Show ==
The television show of Miss Universe Nepal 2024 was announced by AP1 HD.

Episodes
Description	Watch Here
Audition Round	Episode 1
Sash Ceremony	Episode 2
Preliminary Show	Episode 3
Final Event	Grand Finale
