= Keylyn Trajano =

Filipino model and beauty pageant titleholder

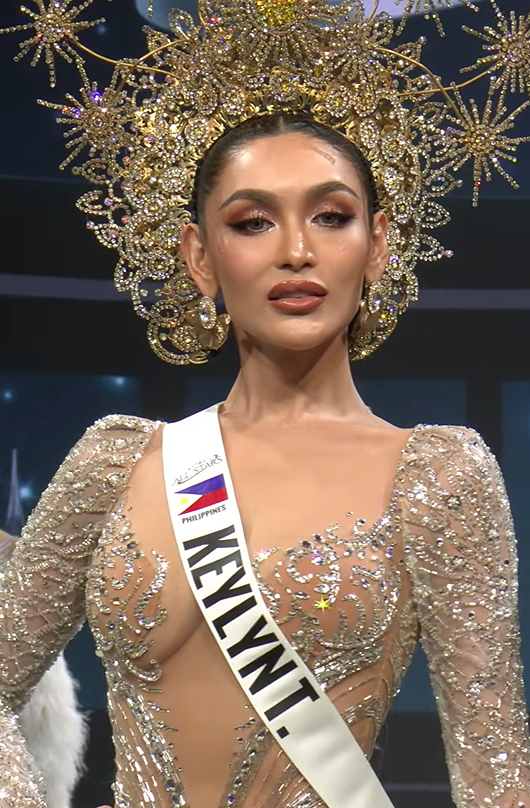
- Trajano in 2026
- Born: Jeddah, Saudi Arabia
- Beauty pageant titleholder
- Title: Universal Woman Arabia 2025
- Major competitions: Universal Woman 2025; (Top 13); (Photogenic); (Voice Challenge); MGI All Stars 1st Edition; (Unplaced)

Key Lyn "Keylyn" Pan Guevarra Trajano is a Filipino model and beauty pageant titleholder who represented Arabia at Universal Woman 2025. She later represented the Philippines at the inaugural edition of MGI All Stars.

== Early life ==
Trajano was born in Jeddah, Saudi Arabia to Filipino parents. Assigned male at birth, her family moved back to the Philippines when she was young and lived in Pampanga most of her life.

== Pageantry ==
=== Miss Universe Philippines Pampanga 2025 ===
In 2025, Trajano represented Sinura, Porac, at the 2025 Miss Universe Philippines Pampanga competition. She made headlines by becoming the first trans woman to compete in a local accredited partner of the Miss Universe Philippines organization.

On January 24, 2025, Trajano announced in an Instagram post that she decided to withdraw from the competition, citing personal reasons.

=== Universal Woman 2025 ===
Trajano represented Arabia at the Universal Woman 2025 competition. She became the first transgender woman to compete in the said pageant. She was officially crowned by Universal Woman 2024, Maria Gigante in a ceremony held in Quezon City on April 29, 2025. During the competition, she was awarded with the photogenic and voice challenge awards.

At the end of the event, Trajano finished as a top 13 semifinalist.

=== MGI All Stars 1st Edition ===
In 2026, Trajano was selected by ALV Pageant Circle as one of the Philippine representatives to the inaugural edition of MGI All Stars. She was officially crowned in a coronation ceremony held on March 24, 2026, in Pasay by Arnold Vegafria. She became the fourth confirmed delegate from the Philippines to the competition after: Miss International Queen 2022, Fuschia Anne Ravena; Noble Queen of the Universe 2025, Alexia Núñez; and Miss Universe Philippines 2019, Gazini Ganados.

At the end of the competition, Trajano was unplaced after failing to enter the top 18.
