= Mister Nepal =

National male beauty pageant competition in Nepal

- Formation: 2001; 25 years ago
- Type: Male pageant
- Headquarters: Kathmandu
- Location: Nepal
- Members: Mister World; Mister Global
- Official language: Nepali
- Key people: Ravi Dhamala
- Website: www.nextmodelsnepal.com

Mister Nepal is a national pageant for men in Nepal. Founded in 2001, it is currently organized by Expose Nepal and conducted by the Kathmandu-based modeling agency Next Models Nepal, selects a winner who receives a cash prize of Rs. 500,000 and the opportunity to represent the country at prestigious international contests like Mister World or Mister Global.

Winners serve as brand ambassadors, engaging in social work, advertisements, and community initiatives to promote Nepali culture globally. Notable titleholders include Himanchal Raj KC (2025), Santosh Lokshum (2024), Samarpan Karki (2023, a pilot from Morang District), and previous victors like Santosh Upadhyaya (2019) and Akshay Jung Rayamajhi (2017), many of whom have competed internationally since 2016 at events such as Mister World

== Titleholders ==
Year	Mister Nepal	Hometown
2025	Himanchal Raj KC	Lalitpur
2024	Santosh Lokshum Limbu	Jhapa
2023	Samarpan Jung Karki	Morang
2022	Nutan Shrestha	Morang
2019	Santosh Upadhyaya	Achham
2018	Bikalp Raj Shrestha	Chitwan
2017	Akshay Jung Rayamajhi	Kathmandu
2016	Ganesh Agrawal	Doti
2015	Sandeep Pokharel	Gorkha
2014	Suraj Chiluwal	Lamjung
2012	Suresh Gauli	Budanilkantha
2011	Dr. Ayushman Ghimire	Tanahun
2005	Ujjwal Karki	Sankhuwasabha
2003	Gautam Subedi	Lalitpur
2002	Jiwan Luitel	Morang
2001	Rohit Thebe	Sunsari

== Placements (Current Franchise) ==
The following men have represented Nepal in the international franchise held by THT Mister Nepal

- : Declared as winner
- : Ended as runner-up or top 5/6 qualification
- : Ended as one of the finalists or semifinalists
- : Ended as special award winner/ qualifier

=== Mister World ===
At the end of 2015, Mr. Nepal acquired the right to select Nepal's representative for Mister World. Mr. Nepal 2016, Ganesh Agrawal, was the first Nepali to compete at this event.

Year	District	Mister Nepal	Placement at Mister World	Special Awards
2024	Jhapa	Santosh Lokshum Limbu	Unplaced	
2019	Chitwan	Akshay Jung Rayamajhi	Top 12	Multimedia Award
2016	Doti	Ganesh Agrawal	Unplaced	

=== Mister Global ===
Year	District	Mister Nepal	Placement at Mister Global	Special Award
2026	Lalitpur	Girish Ratna Shakya	Top 20	Best Video Introduction
2024	Bhaktapur	Yogesh Shrestha	Unplaced	
2023	Morang	Samarpan Jung Karki	Unplaced	
2022	Morang	Nutan Shrestha	Unplaced	
Representative elected by Group of Event (GEE Nepal)
2016	Humla	Dikpal Karki	Top 10	

== See also ==
- Mister and Miss National Nepal
- Miss Universe Nepal
- Miss Nepal
