= Budhanilkantha (disambiguation) =

Budhanilkantha is a municipality in Kathmandu district of Nepal.

Budhanilkantha may also refer to:

- Budhanilkantha School, a school in Kathmandu district of Nepal
- Budhanilkantha Temple, a temple in Kathmandu district of Nepal
