= Universal Woman (pageant) =

International beauty pageant

- Formation: 2023
- Founder: Alexander Gonzalez
- Type: International beauty pageant
- Headquarters: Venezuela
- Official language: English
- Chief executive officer: Carolina Cuartas
- Current titleholder: Marissol Savagin; Brazil
- Most recent edition: 2026
- President: Florence Nacino
- Parent organization: Universal Fashion Ltd.
- Website: universalwomanofficial.com

Universal Woman is an international beauty pageant established in 2023. The competition promotes women's empowerment, diversity, leadership, and social impact, and welcomes contestants from different backgrounds and nationalities. Its inaugural edition was held in Dubai, United Arab Emirates, in February 2023. Subsequent editions have been staged in Cambodia and India.

The pageant is organized around the concept of recognizing women for their individual achievements, leadership, and contributions to society. Its organizers describe it as a platform for women to promote positive change and social initiatives.

The reigning Universal Woman is Marissol Savagin from Brazil, who was crowned on October 9, 2026, in Phnom Penh, Cambodia, succeeding Universal Woman 2025 Ivana Carolina Irizarry of Puerto Rico.

== History ==
Universal Woman was established by international image consultant Alexander Gonzalez, who also created the pageant through his work in international event production and fashion. The competition held its inaugural edition in Dubai, United Arab Emirates, in February 2023, with Valentina Sánchez Trivella of Venezuela becoming its first titleholder. The competition subsequently held its second edition in Phnom Penh, Cambodia, in March 2024, where Maria Gigante of the Philippines won the title. Its third edition took place in Jaipur, India, in August 2025, with Ivana Carolina Irizarry of Puerto Rico winning the crown. In October 2026, the competition returned to Cambodia for its fourth edition, which was won by Marissol Savagin of Brazil.

The organization promotes an inclusive approach to beauty pageantry, emphasizing women's leadership, diversity, confidence, and social contributions. It also promotes philanthropic initiatives through its Universal Mission program, which focuses on women and children.

=== 2023 ===
The inaugural edition of Universal Woman was held on 2 February 2023 in Dubai, United Arab Emirates. Twenty-three contestants representing different countries competed in the competition. Valentina Sánchez Trivella of Venezuela was crowned the first Universal Woman, receiving a reported US$100,000 prize.

=== 2024 ===
The second edition was held on 22 March 2024 in Phnom Penh, Cambodia. Maria Gigante of the Philippines won the title, becoming the first Filipina to receive the crown. Lisandra Chirinos of Venezuela finished as first runner-up, followed by Elisa Mysyshyne of France, Brianna Mai of Cambodia, and Chabeli Peña of the Dominican Republic.

=== 2025 ===
The third edition took place on 10 August 2025 in Jaipur, India. Ivana Carolina Irizarry of Puerto Rico won the title, becoming the first representative of Puerto Rico to win the competition. Iris Miguélez of Spain was named first runner-up, followed by Ismelys Velásquez of Venezuela, Katty López España of Ecuador, and Roci Pankov of Brazil.

=== 2026 ===
The fourth edition was held in Cambodia in October 2026. Marissol Savagin of Brazil won the international title, succeeding Ivana Carolina Irizarry. Anastasia Mwathi of Kenya finished as first runner-up.

== Titleholders ==
Edition	Year(s)	Universal Woman	Venue	Entrants	Ref.
1st	2023	Valentina Sánchez Trivella; Venezuela	Dubai, United Arab Emirates	23	
2nd	2024	Maria Gigante; Philippines	Phnom Penh, Cambodia	44	
3rd	2025	Ivana Carolina Irizarry; Puerto Rico	Jaipur, India	38	
4th	2026	Marissol Savagin; Brazil	Phnom Penh, Cambodia	46	

=== Countries and territories by number of wins ===
Country/territory	Title(s)	Year(s)
Brazil	1	2026
Philippines	1	2024
Puerto Rico	1	2025
Venezuela	1	2023

== Gallery of winner ==
Universal Woman 2024
Maria Gigante

== See also ==
- List of beauty pageants
