= Sampada Ghimire =

Nepalese beauty pageant titleholder

- Born: May 30, 2001 (age 25)
- Height: 5 ft 6 in (168 cm)
- Beauty pageant titleholder
- Title: Miss Universe Nepal 2024
- Hair color: Brown
- Eye colour: Brown
- Major competitions: Miss Supranational Nepal 2023; (2nd Runner-Up); Miss Universe Nepal 2024; (Winner); Miss Universe 2024; (Unplaced)

Sampada Ghimire (Nepali: सम्पदा घिमिरे, born: May 30, 2001) is a Nepalese model, marketing manager and beauty pageant titleholder who was crowned Miss Universe Nepal 2024 and represented her country at Miss Universe 2024.

== Life and career ==
Sampada Ghimire was born on May 30, 2001, in Bhaktapur, Nepal. At the age of 17, she started tutoring the children of industrial laborers. She is also a holistic health and wellness coach and serves as certified children's yoga teacher. On professional front, she works as a content marketing manager and a runway model. She has participated in different modelling shows.

She participated in Miss Supranational Nepal 2023 and emerged as the second runner up. After an year, she joined Miss Universe Nepal 2024 and won the pageant. Her advocacy project called Playful Learnings, Limitless Dreams; is focused on building libraries and providing sport equipments to the areas like refugee camps, slums in order to ensure all-round academic and personal development of underprivileged children. She also revealed her intetest in working for animal welfare and climate awareness.

In 2026, she acted in a music video titled 'Gajale Sunchari'.

== Competitions ==
Years	Competition	Results	Ref.
2022	Model Hunt Nepal	Entrant	
2023	Miss Supranational Nepal	2nd Runner-Up	
2024	Miss Universe Nepal	Winner	
2024	Miss Universe	Unplaced	

== Media Appearance ==
Year	Appeared In	Channel	Type	Ref
2024	Artist Khabar	AK Plus Channel	Interview	
2024	It's My Show	Kantipur Television	Chat show	
2024	On Air with Sanjay	Vyasa Media	Podcast	
2024	Voice for Change	Miss Universe YouTube	Advocacy	
2024	MUN Interview	Kalamandu	Live Interview	
2024	Talk Time	AP1 TV	Live Interview	
2025	MUN 2025 Episode 1/ Finale	OSR Digital	Reality Show	
2026	Gajale Sunchari	Artmandu	Music Video	

Awards and achievements
Preceded by Jane Dipika Garrett	Miss Universe Nepal; 2024	Succeeded by Sanya Adhikari
