= Prayashna Gurung =

Nepalese model

- Prayashna in 2026
- Born: Prayashna Gurung; 13 January 2002 (age 24); Bhairahawa, Nepal
- Education: University of West London
- Height: 1.67 m (5 ft 6 in)
- Beauty pageant titleholder
- Title: Miss Universe Nepal 2026
- Hair color: Dark Brown
- Eye color: Dark Brown
- Major competition: Miss Universe Nepal 2026

Prayashna Gurung (Nepali: प्रयाश्ना गुरुङ; born 13 January 2002) is a Nepalese beauty pageant titleholder who won the Miss Universe Nepal 2026 contest and will represent Nepal at Miss Universe 2027.

== Early life and education ==
Prayashna Gurung was born in Bhairahawa to a Gurung father and a Chhetri mother. She was raised by a single mother that shaped her upbringing. At the age of 20, Prayashna moved to London, to study an undergraduate degree Accounting and Finance at the University of West London. She graduated with a first class honours degree in 2025.

== Personal life ==
Prayashna is married to Jason Pradhan who is based in London, United Kingdom.

=== Project ===
Prayashna is the founder of "Her Dignity Project", an initiative focused on empowering woman through skill based learning, financial literacy and entrepreneurship opportunities. The project helps women develop personally and professionally.

== Pageantry ==
=== Teen Pageants ===
Prayashna competed in Miss Diva Nepal 2019 as contestant number 39. She also competed in Miss SEE Global 2018.

=== Miss Universe Nepal 2026 ===
After completing her degree, Prayashna returned to Nepal and entered her first national pageant, Miss Universe Nepal 2026, as contestant number 10. On 27 September 2026, Prayashna won the Miss Universe Nepal 2026 title making history as the first married woman to be crowned Miss Universe Nepal. Prayashna also won subtitle awards "Miss Popular Choice" after receiving the highest public votes and "TrueDerma Best Skin" and subsequently became the face of TrueDerma.Prayashna represented her hometown of Bhairahawa, along with the Nepalese diaspora in the United Kingdom. She continues to promote Her Dignity Project as her pageant advocacy.

She did not compete at Miss Universe 2026 due to visa issues.

Awards and achievements
Preceded by Sanya Adhikari	Miss Universe Nepal; 2026	Incumbent
