= Universal Woman 2025 =

3rd edition of Universal Woman pageant

- Date: August 10, 2025
- Hosts: Karibel Pérez; Luis Portelles
- Entertainment: Aldris Vargas
- Venue: Jaipur, India
- Broadcaster: YouTube
- Entrants: 38
- Placements: 25
- Debuts: Arabia; Cameroon; Czech Republic; Estonia; Martinique; Nepal; New Zealand; South Africa; Turkey; Zambia
- Withdrawals: Australia; Belgium; Cambodia; China; Denmark; France; Georgia; Germany; Gibraltar; Honduras; Hong Kong; Hungary; Indonesia; Kenya; Lithuania; Malaysia; Moldova; Myanmar; Pakistan; Russia; Tahiti
- Returns: Canada; Ecuador; Italy; Mexico; Peru
- Winner: Ivana Irizarry; Puerto Rico
- Congeniality: Shreeyanka Thapa (Nepal)
- Best National Costume: Gazal Sachdev (India)

Universal Woman 2025 was the 3rd edition of the Universal Woman pageant, held in Jaipur, India on August 10, 2025.

Participants in this edition came from different countries and territories across the world, and they ranged in age from 21 to 45 and had a variety of marital statuses.

External videos
- (Universal Woman 2025)

At the end of the event, Maria Gigante of the Philippines crowned Ivana Irizarry of Puerto Rico as her successor.

== Pageant ==
=== Location and date ===
Due to the ongoing conflict between India and Pakistan, the third edition of the Universal Woman pageant, which was originally scheduled for June 8, was rescheduled for August. On August 10, 2025, the Universal Woman 2025 finale took place in Jaipur, India.

=== Selection committee ===
- Roger Cataño — Businessman and fashion entrepreneur
- Apeksha Dabral — Universal Woman India 2024
- Carolina London — CEO of the Universal Woman pageant
- Mohini Sharma — Founder and CEO of Mrs. India Inc.
- Rhea Singha — Miss Universe India 2024
- Caroline Teixeira — Miss World Brazil 2021

== Results ==
=== Placements ===
Placement	Contestants
Universal Woman 2025	Puerto Rico – Ivana Irizarry
1st Runner-Up	Spain – Iris Miguélez
2nd Runner-Up	Venezuela – Ismelys Velásquez
3rd Runner-Up	Ecuador – Katty López
4th Runner-Up	Brazil – Roci Pankov
Top 13	Arabia – Keylyn Trajano; Cameroon – Chia Doreen; Colombia – Daniela Miranda; Dominican Republic – Catherin Hernández; India – Gazal Sachdev; Peru – Tatiana Merel; Philippines – Jasmine Omay; Vietnam – Bích Ngọc Hà
Top 25	Bolivia – Adry Vargas; Cuba – Nathalee de Armas; Estonia – Madli Visar; Great Britain – Natalie Mageza; Italy – Monica Chirila; Martinique – Jennifer Cafardy; Mexico – Sydney Golden; Namibia – Laina Mwatunkange; Portugal – Bárbara Gavaia; Switzerland – Gio Nicoly; United States – Carolina Lopez; Zimbabwe – Shelly Bent

== Candidates ==
38 candidates will compete in Universal Woman 2025

Country/Territory	Contestant	Age (Note: Ages at the time of the pageant)	Hometown
Arabia	Keylyn Trajano	29	Siñura
Argentina	Agustina Bruenner	27	Posadas
Bolivia	Adry Vargas		
Brazil	Roci Pankov		
Cameroon	Chia Doreen		
Canada	Negar Ostad		
Chile	Fernanda Villalobos		
Colombia	Daniela Miranda		
Cuba	Nathalee de Armas		
Czech Republic	Jana Marvanová	27	Ústí nad Labem
Dominican Republic	Catherin Hernández		
Ecuador	Katty López	32	Pedernales
El Salvador	Katya Molina		
Estonia	Madli Vilsar	34	Kuressaare
Great Britain	Natalie Mageza		
India	Gazal Sachdev		
Italy	Monica Chirila		
Martinique	Jennifer Cafardy		
Mexico	Sydney Golden		
Namibia	Laina Mwatukange	27	
Nepal	Shreeyanka Thapa		
New Zealand	Briar Kerapa		
Peru	Tatiana Merel		
Philippines	Jasmine Omay	25	Tarlac
Poland	Paulina Pieniazek		
Portugal	Bárbara Gavaia		
Puerto Rico	Ivana Irizarry	32	Río Grande
Singapore	Gwen Chin		
South Africa	Charné Cronje		
Spain	Iris Miguélez	27	Galicia
Switzerland	Gio Nicoly		
Thailand	Monica Singh		
Turkey	Esra Nur Turker		
United States	Carolina Lopez		
Venezuela	Ismelys Velásquez	25	La Guaira
Vietnam	Bích Ngọc Hà		
Zambia	Lushomk Kaumba		
Zimbabwe	Shelly Bent		
