= Santosh Upadhyaya =

Nepalese beauty pageant titleholder

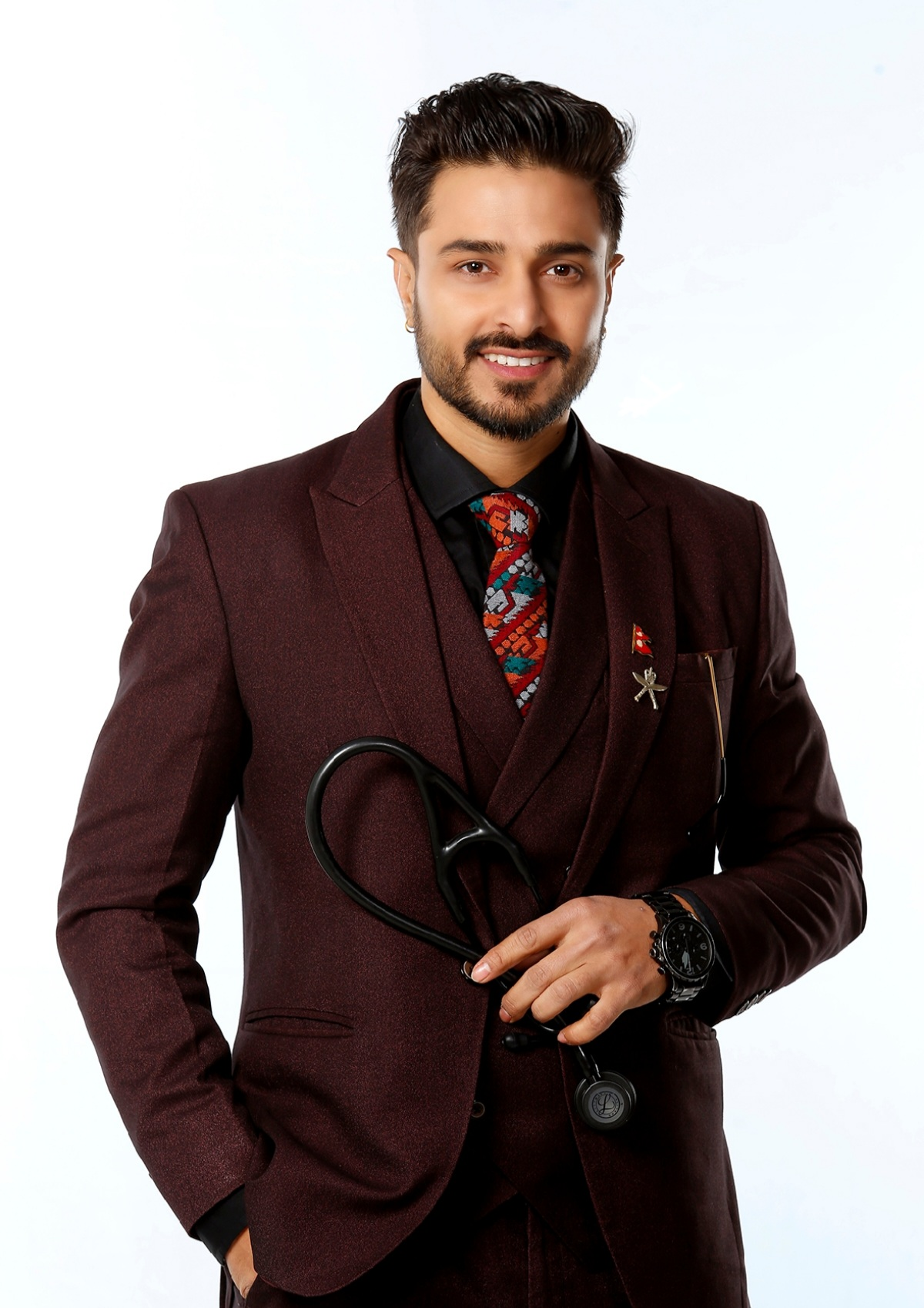
- Dr. Santosh Upadhyaya during Mister Nepal 2019 competition
- Born: March 20, 1991 (age 35)
- Height: 1.78 m (5 ft 10 in)
- Political party: Nepali Congress
- Beauty pageant titleholder
- Title: Mr. Nepal 2019
- Hair color: Dark Brown
- Eye colour: Brown
- Major competitions: Mr. Nepal 2019 (Winner); Mister Suprastar Search 2020; (Winner); Mister Supranational 2021; (3rd Runner-Up); (Mister Influencer)

Dr. Santosh Upadhyaya (Nepali: सन्तोष उपाध्याय , born: March 20, 1991) is a Nepalese doctor, entrepreneur, television presenter and beauty pageant titleholder of Mr. Nepal 2019, he represented Nepal at Mister Supranational 2021 and was third runner up of the competition and the winner of Mister Influencer subtitle. He was the winner of the first edition of Supra Star Search 2020.

== Life and career ==
Upadhyaya was born on March 20, 1991, in Achham, Nepal. He studied MBBS in Tribhuwan University Teaching Hospital, Institute of Medicine, Nepal. He worked as a medical officer at Kamalbazar Primary Healthcare Center, Achham and Lubhu Primary Healthcare Center, Lalitpur. He did his Leadership in Medicine South East Asia course from Harvard Medical School. He joined Mr. Nepal in 2019 and won the title along with Mister talent and Mister Photogenic Subtitle. He represented Nepal in Mister Supranational 2021 competition in Poland to win the 3rd Runner up position and Mister Influencer subtitle.

Upadhyaya also established Sanurvi International and started the beauty pageant Mister and Miss National Nepal. He is serving as national director of Mister and Miss Supranational Nepal from 2022. He is the official franchise holder of Miss and Mister Supranational, The Miss Globe, Miss Intercontinental, Mister International (Thailand) and Mister tourism World for Nepal.

== Competitions ==
Years	Competition	Results	Ref.
2019	Mr. Nepal	Winner	
2020	Mister Suprastar Search	Winner	
2021	Mister Supranational 2021	3rd Runner-Up	

== Political career ==
Upadhyaya is a political leader belonging to the Nepali Congress. He won the Mahadibesan Pratinidhi election from Achham. He was the youngest candidate for general secretary of Nepali Congress at 15th General Convention. He got 97 votes while Pradip Paudel and Udaya Shumsher Rana were elected as the general secretary.

== Nepal Volleyball League ==
Upadhyaya is the Chief Executive Officer of Nepal Volleyball League organized by Kedia Group under Nepal Volleyball Association. He designed the trophy of Nepal Volleyball League named The DNA of Nepal.

Awards and achievements
Preceded by (Poland) Tomasz Zarzycki	Mister Supranational 3rd Runner-up; 2021	Succeeded by (Mexico) Moisés Peñaloza
Preceded by Bikalp Raj Shrestha	Mr. Nepal; 2019	Succeeded by Nutan Shrestha
