= Miss Universe Nepal 2025 =

9th Edition of Miss Universe Nepal Beauty Pageant

- Date: 24 September 2025
- Presenters: Dikpal Karki; Malvika Subba
- Theme: Perfect As You Are
- Venue: Royal Tulip Kathmandu
- Broadcaster: AP1 HD
- Producer: Global Glamour Venture Pvtd. Ltd.
- Sponsor: Nepal Tourism Board; X-Age Nepal; KAJI Productions; True Derma Skincare
- Entrants: 140
- Placements: 15
- Winner: Sanya Adhikari; Kathmandu/ Bangkok
- Miss Popular Choice: Alina Yary; Banke/Australia

Miss Universe Nepal 2025 (MUN 2025) was the 9th edition of Miss Universe Nepal pageant in a reality show format, held on September 24, 2025, at Royal Tulip Kathmandu, Lalitpur. Sampada Ghimire of Bhaktapur crowned Sanya Adhikari as Miss Universe Nepal 2025 who represented Nepal at Miss Universe 2025.

The event was nationally live streamed via AP1 HD on television, and internationally via 'OSR Reality' YouTube channel.

== Background ==
The press conference of MUN 2025 was held at Hilton Hotel Kathmandu on May 28, 2025, where the registrations for the pageant were announced from May 29 to July 26, 2025. It was also announced that the pageant will follow TV Reality Series format with city auditions according to online registration details of applicants via Khalti App.

City Auditions
Host city	Audition Date	Entrants
Damak	July 12, 2025	40
Biratnagar	July 13, 2025	40
Kathmandu	August 9, 2025	100

On August 7, 2025, the Miss Universe Nepal team visited the 'Meet and Greet' organized by NAIMA Mobility Expo as a part of public interaction event. For the reality show version, MUN partnered with OSR Reality, national level digital media for reality shows.

== Team ==
The Team of Global Glamour Venture for MUN 2025

1. Sangita Puri, National Director
2. Alok Chettri (Nabin KC), Managing Director
3. Sabi Puri, CEO/President
4. Alexander Gonzalez, International Choreographer and Image Consultant
5. Prashant Tamrakar, Choreographer
6. Sushant Kaji Shrestha, founder of KAJI Production

== Miss Universe Nepal 2025 Reality Show ==
=== Production ===
As announced in press conference, the pageant was a reality show with slight modifications to its basic pageant format. Prashant Tamrakar served as the choreographer and 'Master Jury' while Sangita Puri as the 'Grand Jury' for the reality show. The studio for various rounds of the pageant including grand finale was located at Royal Tulip Kathmandu, Lalitpur.

Out of 140 entrants of auditions, 15 contestants entering the reality show were required to perform in several episodic challenges based on which episodic Top 5 was selected by judges' score and one of the episodic Top 5 was eligible to win that episode. The episode winners were announced on finale and got direct entry to Grand Finale Top 10 placement.

=== Show Format ===
Summary of episodes
SN	Performance Stages	External Link
1	Road to the Crown- Entry of 12 contestants, who were required to explain their motive of participating in the pageant.	EP 1
2	Unfiltered Q/A- Entry of 3 wildcard contestants and all the contestants performed in unfiltered Q/A segment.	EP 2
3	Grandmom's Wardrobe Challenge- Contestants were required to perform in walk presentation and story telling wearing outfits inspired from their grandmothers.	EP 3
4	Runway Challenge- Contestants were required to perform in a Runway Challenge, wearing outfits from Sharon's Couture.	EP 4
5	Cultural Photoshoot Challenge	EP 5
6	Queen's Kitchen Challenge- Entertainment based cooking challenge, non-credit episode without any fast track entry to grand finale placement.	EP 6
7	Preliminary Competition- Swimsuit Round, Gown Round, Crown Reveal and Personal Interview.	Close Door
8	Grand Finale Top 15 contestant performed in introduction, swimsuit and cocktail dress segments. Then Top 10 was decided based on fast track episodes and preliminary score followed by evening gown round and Q/A. Then Top 5 appeared a final question that determined the winner.	Finals

== Contestants ==
=== List of Contestants ===
The episodes served as fast-tracks for direct placement at finale, with no elimination of contestants till finale.

All the Top 5 contestants of Episode 2 were advanced to finale by winning other episodes or merit; so the 6th position holder was advanced to Finals Top 10.

All the candidates got fair chance of winning Episode 1 with no Top 5 announcement.

Episode 6 was entertainment based and not fast-track challenge.

Contestant Status
Representing	Contestant	EP 1	EP 2	EP 3	EP 4	EP 5	EP 6	Finals	Ref.
Kathmandu	Aarohi Basnet	Won	Top 5		Top 5			Ep 1	
Kohalpur, Banke	Lisa Barnawal		Won	Top 5		Top 5		Ep 2	
Bagmati/ Toronto, Canada	Sonalisa Dhungana		Top 5	Won	Top 5	Top 5		Ep 3	
Tehrathum	Shikha Parajuli		Top 5	Top 5	Won			Ep 4	
Lalitpur	Jyoti Thapa			Top 5		Won		Ep 5	
Kathmandu/ Bangkok, Thailand	Sanya Adhikari		Top 5			Top 5		Merit	
Nawalparasi	Barsha Kandel		Wildcard		Top 5			Merit	
Mechi	Suyesha Singh Raj							Merit	
Karnali Province	Nirjara Neupane							Merit	
Banke/ Australia	Alina Yary		Top 5	Top 5		Top 5		Merit	
Kathmandu	Pratikshya Adhikari							Unplaced	
Lalitpur	Angel Dangol				Top 5			Unplaced	
Sudurpaschim Province	Elisha Deuba							Unplaced	
Dharan	Saraswati Rai		Wildcard					Unplaced	
Kathmandu	Isha Rai		Wildcard					Unplaced	

Color key:

Contestant entered as wildcard in that episode.
Contestant advanced to the next episode, but was not in the Top 5.
Contestant was included in Top 5 by judges' score.
Contestant was not in Top 5 but won the episode by judges' choice.
Contestant got placement at grand finale Top 10 by preliminary merit.
Contestant got placement at grand finale Top 10 by winning that episode.
Contestant was unplaced at grand finale Top 10.

=== Miss Popular Choice ===
Online voting for Miss Popular Coice started from August 24, after the release of first episode and lasted till September 24, 5:00 PM NST. 'Khalti App' was the official voting platform.

Miss Popular Choice- Votes Reveal
Rank	Week 1	Week 2	Week 3	Week 4	SEPT 24, 2025 (5 PM)
1	Alina Yary	Alina Yary	Alina Yary	Aarohi Basnet	Alina Yary ★
2	Aarohi Basnet	Aarohi Basnet	Aarohi Basnet	Alina Yary	Sanya Adhikari
3	Sanya Adhikari	Nirjara Neupane	Sanya Adhikari	Sanya Adhikari	Aarohi Basnet
4	Nirjara Neupane	Shikha Parajuli	Nirjara Neupane	Sonalisa Dhungana	Sonalisa Dhungana
5	Lisa Barnawal	Sanya Adhikari	Sonalisa Dhungana	Nirjara Neupane	Shikha Parajuli
6	Suyesha Singh Raj	Lisa Barnawal	Suyesha Singh Raj	Shikha Parajuli	Nirjara Neupane
7	Pratikshya Adhikari	Suyesha Singh Raj	Shikha Parajuli	Suyesha Singh Raj	Suyesha Singh Raj
8	Barsha Kandel	Pratikshya Adhikari	Lisa Barnawal	Lisa Barnawal	Jyoti Thapa
9	Saraswati Rai	Isha Rai	Isha Rai	Isha Rai	Lisa Barnawal
10	Jyoti Thapa	Angel Dangol	Angel Dangol	Jyoti Thapa	Isha Rai

(★): Winner of Miss Popular Choice, direct entry to Grand Finale Top 5.

== Results ==
Top 10 Results
Placement	Contestant	International Result
Miss Universe Nepal 2025	Kathmandu/ Bangkok- Sanya Adhikari	Miss Universe 2025- Unplaced
1st Runner Up	Kathmandu- Aarohi Basnet ●	
2nd Runner Up	Bagmati/ Toronto- Sonalisa Dhungana ●	
3rd Runner Up	Banke/Australia- Alina Yary ★	
4th Runner Up	Lalitpur- Jyoti Thapa ●	
Top 10	Karnali- Nirjara Neupane	
Top 10	Kohalpur- Lisa Barnawal ●	
Top 10	Tehrathum- Shikha Parajuli ●	
Top 10	Mechi- Suyesha Singh Raj	
Top 10	Nawalparasi- Barsha Kandel	

(●): Candidate won one of the episodes and directly placed at Top 10.

(★): Candidate won 'Miss Popular Choice' and directly placed at Top 5.

== Subtitles ==
Subtitles	Winner
Miss Popular Choice	Banke/ Australia- Alina Yary
Miss Free & Fearless	Kathmandu- Aarohi Banset
Miss Healthy Skin	Kathmandu- Aarohi Banset
Miss Elegance	Bagmati/ Toronto- Sonalisa Dhungana
Face of True Derma	Bagmati/ Toronto- Sonalisa Dhungana
Face of Amrit Oil	Kohalpur, Banke- Lisa Barnawal
Face of Shagoon Jewellers	Tehrathum- Shikha Parajuli
Miss Smart (X-Age)	Kathmandu/ Bangkok- Sanya Adhikari
