= Sanya Adhikari =

Miss Universe Nepal 2025

- सान्या अधिकारी
- Born: July 2, 2002 (age 24); Kathmandu, Nepal
- Education: Assumption University of Thailand
- Known for: Beauty Pageant Titleholder Social Activism UNESCAP Miss Universe 2025 (Entrant)
- Title: Miss Universe Nepal 2025

Sanya Adhikari (born 2 July 2002) is a Nepalese beauty pageant titleholder of Miss Universe Nepal 2025 and she represented Nepal in Miss Universe 2025.

== Life and career ==
Adhikari was born in Kathmandu, Nepal where she obtained her school education and intermediate education. In 2015, she visited the United States and later attended the Assumption University of Thailand, in Bangkok from 2020 to 2024. In 2024, she moved to Australia and worked in transport division of Transport Police and Research Section of the United Nations Economic and Social Commission for Asia and the Pacific (UNESCAP).

In 2025, she entered the reality show Miss Universe Nepal 2025 and earned the right to represent Nepal in Miss Universe 2025 in Thailand.

== Pageantry ==
=== Miss Universe Nepal 2025 ===
Sanya Adhikari, participated in the MUN Reality Show and won the Miss Universe Nepal 2025 pageant held in The Royal Tulip, Gwarko, Lalitpur. She also bagged the award of Miss Smart by X-Age Nepal. She had consistently maintained her spot at Top 5 in the 6 episodic challenges of MUN 2025 Reality Show and also maintained her presence in Top 10 of 'MUN Miss Popular Choice 2025'.

=== Miss Universe 2025 ===
She represented Nepal at Miss Universe 2025, on November 1, 2025, but was unplaced. She was widely noticed for her national costume at Miss Universe 2025 named 'Hands of Peace' that was inspired from Emblem of Nepal, Flag of Nepal and the Prayer Flags related to Himalayas.

== Media appearance ==
Media Appearnce during reign of MUN 2025
Year	Appeared In	Channel	Note
2025	Artist Khabar	AK Plus	
2025	E Talks	News 24	
2025	Milano Runway VOL 5		
2025	MUN 2025	OSR Digital	Reality Show
2025	Ratopati Interview	Ratopati TV	Interview
2025	Talk Time	AP1 TV	Chat Show
2026	MUN Runway	Kantipur Television	Performer
2026	MUN Swimsuit Contest	Kantipur Television	Judge

== Works ==
- During her term as Miss Universe Nepal, Adhikari worked as social activist against child labor and promoter of accessible education in collaboration with International Labor Organization, a specialized agency of United Nations.
- She was appointed as Social Cause Ambassador of Ant Foundation Nepal after winning MUN 2025.
- She performed in fashion events and runways like MILANO Runway, Influencer Night etc. that were associated with Miss Universe Nepal.
- She also served as the face of sportswear brand 361, electronics brand X-Age and skincare brand True Derma and Shagoon Jewellers, during her term as Miss Universe Nepal.
- She also used her platform, to raise relief materials for the survivors of 2026 Nepal Floods, in collaboration with non-profit organization Astitwa Nepal and Miss Universe Nepal Org.
- She appeared as runway performer in fashion event by Miss Universe Nepal named MUN-Runway 2026.

Awards and achievements
Preceded by Sampada Ghimire	Miss Universe Nepal; 2025	Succeeded by Prayashna Gurung
