= Universal Woman 2023 =

1st edition of Universal Woman pageant

- Date: February 2, 2023
- Venue: Dubai, United Arab Emirates
- Broadcaster: Streaming: YouTube
- Entrants: 23
- Placements: 10
- Debuts: Argentina; Bolivia; Brazil; Cambodia; Canada; Colombia; Cuba; Dominican Republic; Ecuador; Ethiopia; Hungary; India; Italy; Kenya; Mexico; Paraguay; Peru; Poland; Portugal; Thailand; The Gambia; Uruguay; Venezuela
- Withdrawals: China; Namibia; Russia; Tanzania; Zimbabwe
- Winner: Valentina Belén Sánchez Trivella (Venezuela)
- Best National Costume: Martha Suárez Briano (Mexico)

Universal Woman 2023 is the inaugural edition of Universal Woman, it was held in Dubai, United Arab Emirates, from January 28 to February 2. The competition welcomed 23 participants of varying marital status and ages ranging from 25 to 45, from various nations and territories.

External videos
- (Universal Woman 2023)

At the end of the event, Valentina Belén Sánchez Trivella , representing Venezuela, was crowned Universal Woman 2023 receiving a prize of USD 100,000.

== Results ==
=== Placements ===
Placement	Contestants
Universal Woman 2023	Venezuela — Valentina Sánchez
1st Runner-up	Dominican Republic — Karibel Pérez
2nd Runner-up	Brazil – Jéssica Peixoto Poeta Lírio
3rd Runner-up	Gambia — Kaddy Samateh Janneh
4th Runner-up	Cambodia — Davin Prasath
Top 10	Ecuador — Michelle Huet; Mexico — Martha Suárez Briano; Paraguay — Lourdes Motta Rolón; Peru — Pierangeli Dodero Jovich; Thailand — Bee Sataya-apithan

=== Special awards ===
Awards	Contestants
Best National Costume	Mexico — Martha Suárez Briano
Healthy Body	Mexico — Martha Suárez Briano
Photogenic	Paraguay — Lourdes Motta Rolón
Elegance	Kenya — Celestine Awuor

== Candidates ==
23 confirmed contestants competing for the title.

Country or Territory	Contestants	Age (Note: Ages during the competition)
Argentina	Sasha Victoria Gigliani	29
Bolivia	Andrea Herrera Añez	38
Brazil	Jéssica Peixoto Poeta Lírio	29
Cambodia	Davin Prasath	31
Canada	Victoria Vallejo Villa	35
Colombia	Gladys Cecilia González Martínez	30
Cuba	Judith Ramos Valdés	30
Dominican Republic	Karibel Pérez	29
Ecuador	Michelle Nathalie Huet Rodríguez	27
Ethiopia	Roza Geremew Mola	37
Gambia	Kaddy Samateh Janneh	28
Hungary	Szonja Dudik	23
India	Sonali Kakde	
Italy	Briana Di Tommaso	40
Kenya	Celestine Awuor	28
Mexico	Martha Leticia Suárez Briano	30
Paraguay	Lourdes María del Carmen Motta Rolón	30
Peru	Pierangeli Daniela Dodero Jovich	38
Poland	Angelika Fajcht	27
Portugal	Karina Fernandes	34
Thailand	Bee Wipaporn Sataya-apithan	41
Uruguay	Lesly Elizabeth Lemos Martínez	30
Venezuela	Valentina Belén Sánchez Trivella	27
