= Chapali Bhadrakali =

Village in Bagmati Province, Nepal

Chapali Bhadrakali चपली भद्रकाली
- Village of Budanilkantha Municipality
- Location in Nepal
- Coordinates: 27°46′48″N 85°22′48″E
- Country: Nepal
- Province: No. 3
- District: Kathmandu District

Population (2011)
  - Total: 10,827
  - Religions: Hindu
- Time zone: UTC+5:45 (Nepal Time)

Chapali Bhadrakali is a village and former Village Development Committee that is now part of Budanilkantha Municipality in Kathmandu District in Province No. 3 of central Nepal. At the time of the 2011 Nepal census it had a population of 10,827 and had 2,574 households in it.

== Toponymy ==
=== Linguistic origin ===
- Linguistic family:
- Language:

=== Etymology ===
“Chapali” means agile, active, or moving. “Bhadrakali” is a form of the goddess Kali: “Bhadra” means auspicious or gentle, and “Kali” symbolizes power and destruction. The place was named after the temple of the goddess Bhadrakali located there.

Chapali (चपली) means “agile, lively” and comes from Sanskrit चपल (capala) meaning “restless, quick, energetic. Bhadrakali (भद्रकाली) is a compound of भद्र (bhadra) meaning “auspicious, kind, noble, virtuous, refined” and काली (kālī) meaning “the dark one,” a fierce form of the goddess Durga.

The toponym reflects both descriptive geography (possibly a lively or flowing area) and religious identity, centered on the worship of a powerful female deity.
