= Chunikhel =

Chunikhel चुनिखेल
- Village of Budanilkantha Municipality
- Location in Nepal
- Coordinates: 27.76°N 85.38°E
- Country: Nepal
- Province: No. 3
- District: Kathmandu District

Population (2011)
  - Total: 4,449
- Time zone: UTC+5:45 (Nepal Time)

Chunikhel is a village and former Village Development Committee that is now part of Budanilkantha Municipality in Kathmandu District in Province No. 3 of central Nepal. At the time of the 2011 Nepal census it had a population of 4,449 living in 859 households. Chunikhel it has 15 VDC in total. It is located in 27°45'31.1"N 85°22'17.0"E just few kilometre away from heart of kathmandu. Chunikhel is gate for entering Shivapuri National park.

== Toponymy ==
=== Linguistic origin ===
- Linguistic family: Indoeuropean
- Language: Sanskrit

=== Etymology ===
Chuni” usually refers to lime or limestone, a mineral used in construction. “Khel” means village or settlement. Thus, Chunikhel can be interpreted as “the village associated with lime or limestone.”

Chuni (चुनि) = comes from Nepali चुना (chunā) meaning “lime, limestone,” itself from Sanskrit चूर्ण (cūrṇa) meaning “powder, ground substance.” Khel (खेल) is a common Nepali toponymic suffix for “village, settlement,” coming from Sanskrit खेल (khela) that means “open area, play.”

Some narratives say that the name Chunikhel was derived from goddess Chunidevi. It is unclear the influence of Newari in this toponym.
