= Khadka Bhadrakali =

Khadka Bhadrakali खड्का भद्रकाली
- ward
- Location in Nepal
- Coordinates: 27.76°N 85.34°E
- Country: Nepal
- Zone: Bagmati Zone
- District: Kathmandu District

Area
  - Total: 2.32 km^{2} (0.90 sq mi)

Population (2011)
  - Total: 10,761
  - Density: 4,640/km^{2} (12,000/sq mi)
- Time zone: UTC+5:45 (Nepal Time)

Khadka Bhadrakali was a village in Kathmandu District in the Bagmati Zone before being incorporated into city of Budhanilkantha (along with Chapali Bhadrakali, Mahankal, Bishnu Budhanilkantha, Chunikhel and Kapan). At the time of the 1991 Nepal census it had a population of 5,539 . On recent survey in 2011, the VDC had a total population of 10,761.
