= Mahankal, Kathmandu =

Mahankal, Kathmandu महांकाल
- Village of Budanilkantha Municipality
- Location in Nepal
- Coordinates: 27.75°N 85.35°E
- Country: Nepal
- Province: No. 3
- District: Kathmandu District

Population (1991)
  - Total: 3,793
- Time zone: UTC+5:45 (Nepal Time)

Mahankal, Kathmandu is a village and former Village Development Committee that is now part of Budanilkantha Municipality in Kathmandu District in Province No. 3 of central Nepal. At the time of the 1991 Nepal census, it had a population of 3,793 living in 710 households.
