= Budhanilkantha Temple =

Hindu and Buddhist temple in Nepal

- बूढानीलकण्ठ मन्दिर
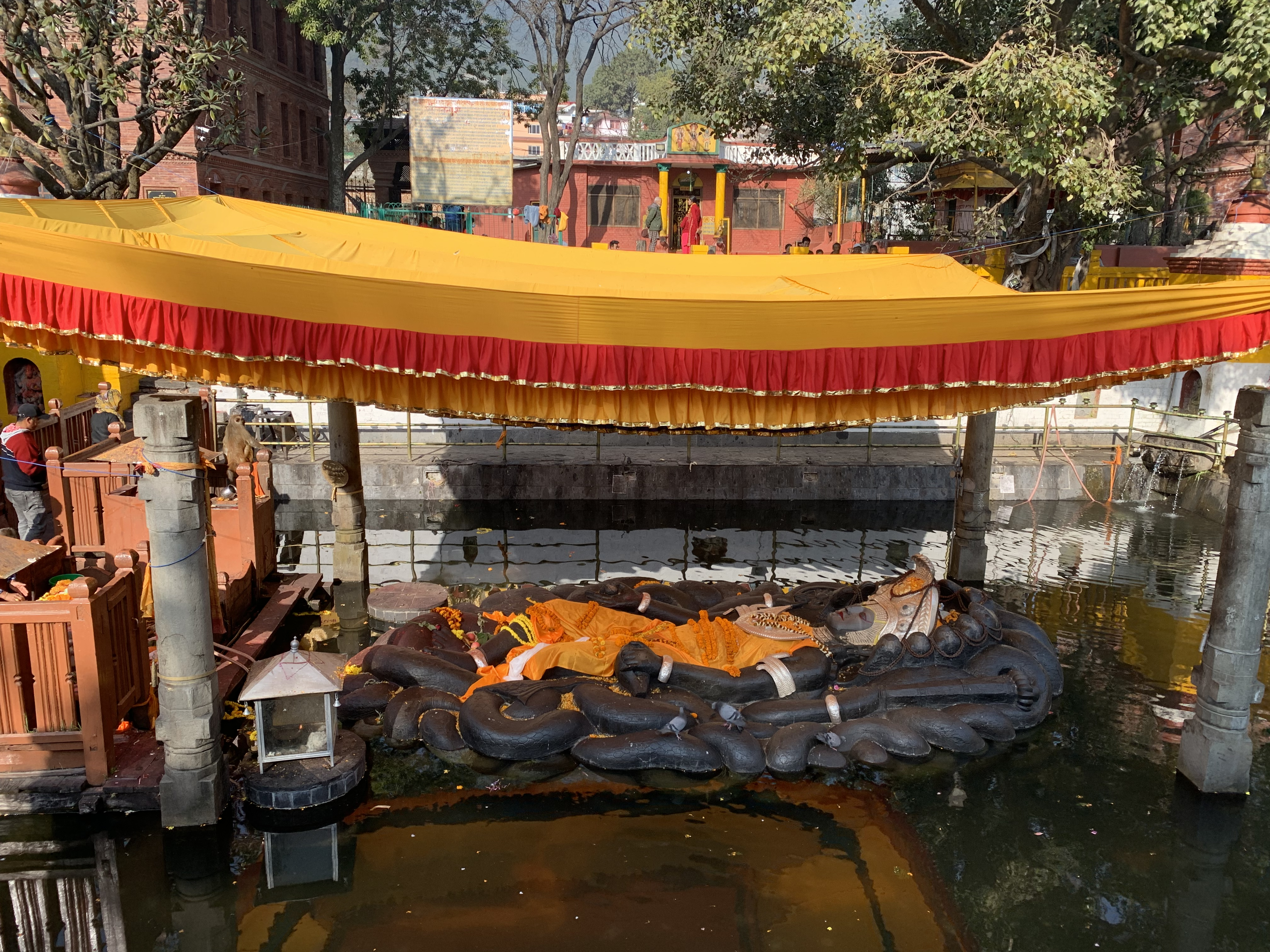

Religion
- Affiliation: Hinduism
- District: Kathmandu
- Province: Bagmati
- Deity: Bhagavan Vishnu / Buddha
- Festival: Prabodhini Ekadashi

Location
- Location: Budanilkantha
- Country: Nepal
- Interactive map of Budhanilkantha Temple

Architecture
- Type: Open Air
- Length: 5 m (16 ft)

Protected Ancient Monument
- Law: Ancient Monuments Preservation Act, 2013 (1956)
- ID: NP-KTMBK-01

Budanilkantha Temple, located in Budhanilkantha, Nepal, (Nepali: बुढानिलकण्ठ मन्दिर; translation: Old Blue Throat) is a Hindu open air temple dedicated to Lord Mahavishnu. Budhanilkantha Temple is also known as the Narayanthan Temple for Hindus, and can be identified by a large reclining statue of Lord Mahavishnu.

== Religious Significance ==
According to Hindus Budhanilkantha has a Sanskrit origin that means 'Old Blue Throat', a title of Shiva that was given by the gods after Shiva drank poison to save the world. The statue symbolizes the god Vishnu, who is regarded as one of the 'Trimurtis', along with Brahma and Shiva.

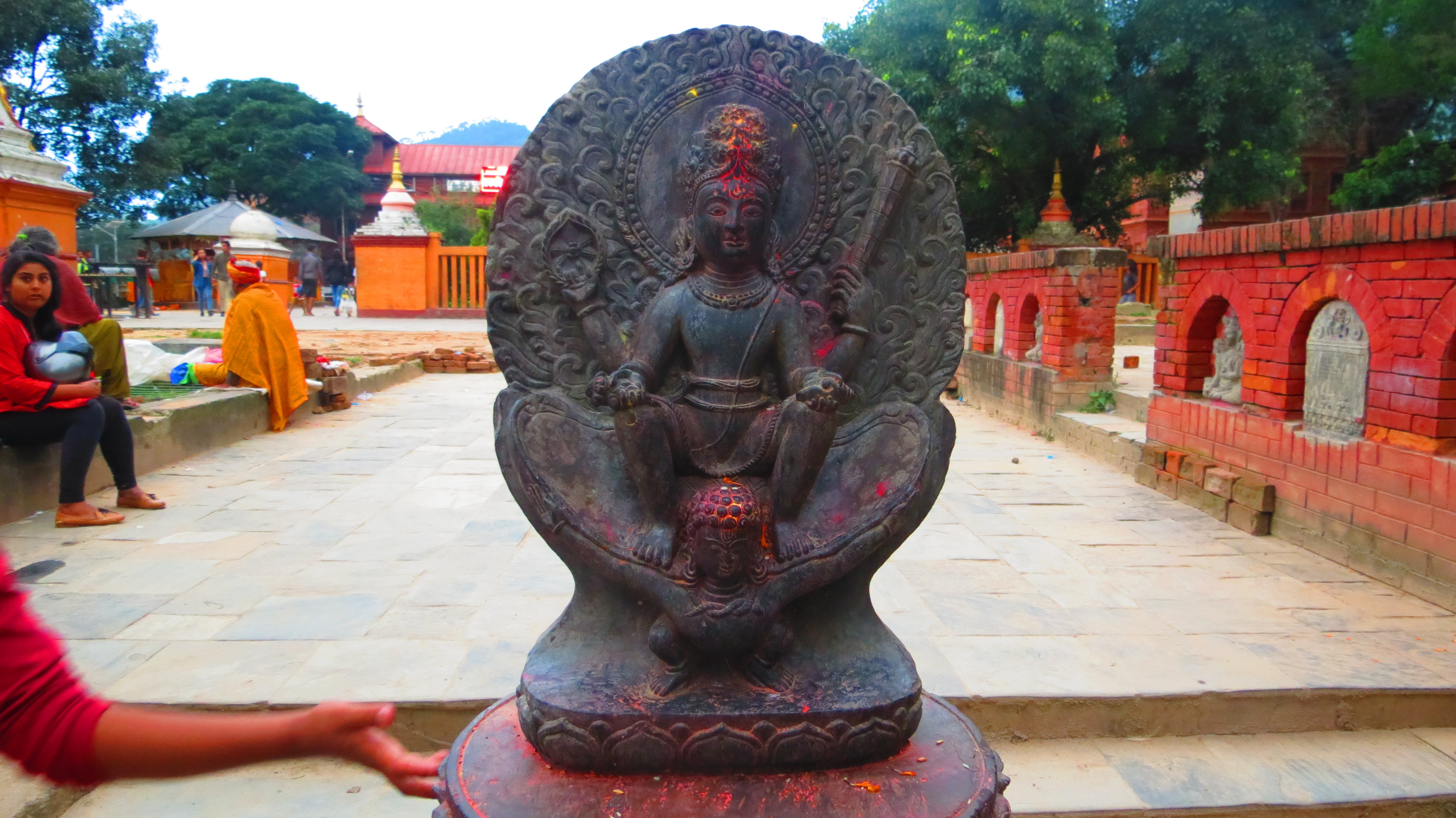
A statue of Vishnu, sitting on Garuda, at the temple premise

The Hindu scriptures Bhagavata Purana, Vishnu Purana and the epics Ramayana and Mahabharata refer to Samudra manthan, which is directly related to the origin of Gosaikunda. According to legend, the spring that feeds the pond in the Budanilkantha temple is connected to Gosaikunda, causing it to have a direct connection to the water source from Shiva. This is the reason why its name is dedicated to Shiva even though the statue is dedicated to Vishnu.

This temple is regarded as a sacred place for Hindus but is also venerated by Buddhists. It is considered as a sign of religious harmony that has existed in the region since ancient times.

== Location ==
Budhanilkantha Temple is situated below the Shivapuri Hill at the northern end of the Kathmandu valley.

== Feature ==
The main statue is carved of a single block of black basalt. The temple's main statue of Budhanilkantha is considered the largest stone carving in Nepal.

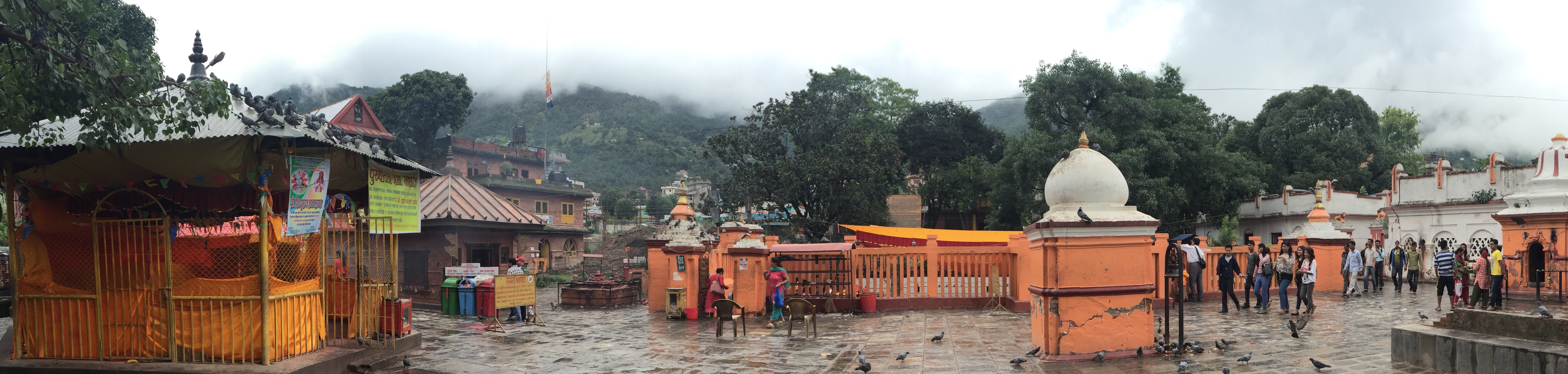
Budhanilkantha Temple Compound panoramic view

== See also ==
- List of Hindu temples in Nepal
