= Kapan, Nepal =

Kapan, Nepal कपन
- Village of Budanilkantha Municipality
- Interactive map of Kapan, Nepal
- Coordinates: 27.74°N 85.37°E
- Country: Nepal
- Province: No. 3
- District: Kathmandu District

Population (2011)
  - Total: 48,463
- Time zone: UTC+5:45 (Nepal Time)
- Postal code: 44600

Kapan is a residential area and former Village Development Committee that is now part of Budanilkantha Municipality in Kathmandu District in Province No. 3 of central Nepal. It is situated in the northern part of Kathmandu. At the time of the 2011 Nepal census it had a population of 48,463 in 12,324 households. Kapan Sangit Sarowar (a platform for musicians), Kapan Monastery (Buddhist temple), Kapan Aani Gumba (Ladies Monks' Monastery) etc. are tourist places situated at Kapan. Kapan consists of several settlements, e. g.: Mahankal, New Colony, Jyotinagar, Saraswatinagar, Golphutar or Baluwakhani. Kapan has recently developed very high number of Paying Guest Houses for local-tourism.
