= Global Glamour Venture =

Global Glamour Venture Pvt. Ltd.
- ग्लोबल ग्ल्यामर भेन्चर
- Formation: 2024
- Headquarters: Kathmandu
- President and CEO: Sabi Puri
- Managing Director: Alok Chhetri
- Sister Organization: D'Cosmo Nepal
- Affiliations: Miss Earth (2026-present) Universal Woman (2025-present) Miss Universe (2024-present)

Global Glamour Venture PVT LTD is a Nepalese organization led by Sabi Puri that selects Nepalese representatives for multiple international beauty pageants.

== Background ==
The organization was formed in 2024, when the franchise of Miss Universe Nepal was awarded to Global Glamour Venture (GGV). Later, the franchise of Universal Woman and Miss Earth Nepal were also given to GGV under the leadership of CEO Sabi Puri.

Key people in the company include:

- Sabi Puri, CEO and president, is also the managing director of D'Cosmo Nepal, and is a skincare consultant.
- Alok Chhetri, the company's managing director, is an entrepreneur with a degree in information technology and is involved in tech platforms.
- Sangita Puri, company director, is also the CEO of D'Cosmo Nepal with expertise in the skincare field. She is also involved in charitable organizations like Didi Foundation.

== Pageant franchises ==
=== Miss Universe Nepal ===
Global Glamour Venture acquired Miss Universe Nepal franchise in 2024 and continues to hold it till present. Sangita Puri serves as license-holder of Miss Universe Nepal. Here is the list of editions organized by Global Glamour Venture.

| Year | Event | Venue | Winner | International Result |
|---|---|---|---|---|
| 2026 | Miss Universe Nepal 2026 | The Soaltee Kathmandu | Prayashna Gurung, Rupandehi | Miss Universe 2026- TBA |
| 2025 | Miss Universe Nepal 2025 | Royal Tulip Hotel, Lalitpur | Sanya Adhikari, Kathmandu | Miss Universe 2025- Unplaced |
| 2024 | Miss Universe Nepal 2024 | Godavari Sunrise Convention Center | Sampada Ghimire, Bhaktapur | Miss Universe 2024- Unplaced |

=== Universal Woman Nepal ===
Global Glamour Venture (GGV) acquired Universal Woman franchise in 2025 with Sabi Puri as license-holder. Here is the details of Universal Woman Nepal under GGV.

| Year | Title | Venue | Winner | International Result |
|---|---|---|---|---|
| 2026 | Universal Woman Nepal 2026 | The Soaltee Kathmandu | Sangita Puri, Kathmandu | TBA |
| 2025 | Universal Woman Nepal 2024 | Hilton Hotel Kathmandu | Shreeyanka Thapa, Syangja | Universal Woman 2025- Unplaced; Miss Congeniality |

=== Miss Earth Nepal ===
Global Glamour Venture acquired Miss Earth franchise in 2026 with Sabi Puri as license-holder. Here is the details of Miss Earth Nepal under GGV.

| Year | Title | Venue | Winner | International Result |
|---|---|---|---|---|
| 2026 | Miss Earth Nepal 2026 | The Soaltee Kathmandu | Binita Oli, Jhapa | Miss Earth 2026- TBA |
