= Universal Woman 2024 =

2nd edition of Universal Woman pageant

- Date: March 22, 2024
- Hosts: Julia Gama; Leav Veng Hour
- Venue: Phnom Penh, Cambodia
- Broadcaster: Streaming: YouTube
- Entrants: 44
- Placements: 24
- Debuts: Australia; Belgium; Chile; China; Denmark; El Salvador; France; Georgia; Germany; Gibraltar; Great Britain; Honduras; Hong Kong; Indonesia; Lithuania; Malaysia; Myanmar; Moldova; Namibia; Pakistan; Philippines; Puerto Rico; Russia; Tahiti; Singapore; Spain; Switzerland; Vietnam; Zimbabwe
- Withdrawals: Canada; Ecuador; Ethiopia; Gambia; Italy; Mexico; Paraguay; Peru
- Winner: Maria Gigante (Philippines)
- Best National Costume: Shafina Shah (Pakistan)

Universal Woman 2024 was the second edition of Universal Woman pageant, held in Phnom Penh, Cambodia, on March 24, 2024. This pageant will welcome participants of various marital statuses and ages between 25 and 45, from various nations and territories around the world.

External videos
- (Universal Woman 2024)

At the end of the event, Valentina Belén Sánchez Trivella of Venezuela, the first Universal Woman, crowned Maria Gigante of the Philippines as her successor.

== Pageant ==
=== Location and date ===
The competition was held in Phnom Penh, Cambodia on March 14, 2024, up to March 22, 2024.

=== Selection Committee ===
- Luis Portelles – Influencer and pageant expert
- Benjamin Wong – General Manager of New Silk Road Industry Group and a respected mentor in Miss World China
- Sirey Morán Castro – Miss Honduras Universe 2016
- Rafael Nieves – Dancing with the Stars champion and master of luxury as a broker for private jets and yachts
- Sangita Puri – CEO of De Cosmo Nepal
- Rern Sinat – Miss Universe Cambodia 2018
- Carolina London – CEO of Universal Woman.

== Results ==
=== Placements ===
Placement	Contestants
Universal Woman 2024	Philippines – Maria Gigante §
1st Runner-up	Venezuela – Lisandra Chirinos §
2nd Runner-up	France – Elisa Mysyshyne
3rd Runner-up	Cambodia – Brianna Mai
4th Runner-up	Dominican Republic – Chabeli Peña
Top 12	Argentina – Micaela López; Brazil – Carina Manzi; Cuba – Donna Mujica; Denmark – Laura Schou; Great Britain – Ashley Powell; Puerto Rico – Elaine Rosado; Zimbabwe – Sindiso Foulkes §
Top 24	Belgium – Sarah-Maria Lux; Bolivia – Janella von Duker §; China – Yali Hu; Colombia – Laura Rentería; Honduras – Katherine Nicole Chávez; Germany – Lila Jostingmeier; India – Apeksha Darbal; Kenya – Linet Kinya Muthomi; Malaysia – Chun Joo Yee; Switzerland – Vanessa Mab Williams; Thailand – Jennifer Panlita Gustavson; Vietnam – Bianca Huynh Nguyen

§ – Automatically enters top 24 by public votes.

=== Continental Queens ===
Continental titles	Candidates
Universal Woman Africa	Kenya – Linet Kinya Muthomi
Universal Woman America	Argentina – Micaela López Bianchi
Universal Woman Asia	Thailand – Jennifer Panlita Gustavson
Universal Woman Caribbean	Puerto Rico – Elaine Marie Rosado Rivera
Universal Woman Europe	Great Britain – Ashley Lauren Powell
Universal Woman Pacific	Honduras – Katherine Nicole Ponce Chávez
Universal Woman Oceania	Australia – Shirley Pulido Hadler

=== Special awards ===
Awards	Contestants
Sympathy	Philippines – Maria Gigante
MVLA	Philippines – Maria Gigante
Social Media	Philippines – Maria Gigante
Skin	Zimbabwe – Sindiso Ndlovou Foulkes
Speaker	Zimbabwe – Sindiso Ndlovou Foulkes
Wardrobe	Puerto Rico – Elaine Marie Rosado Rivera
Smile	El Salvador – Andrea Morán Benítez
Earth Baby Ambassador	Malaysia – Chun Joo Yee
Beautiful Eyes	Denmark – Laura Schou
Catwalk	Venezuela – Lisandra Chirinos Guillen
Photogenic	Lithuania – Raimonda Gecaite
Social Project	India – Apeksha Darbal
Inspirational	Colombia – Laura Rentería
Top Model	China – Yali Hu
Panctuality	Gibraltar – Yanira Jimenez Pelaez
Rehearsal Queen	Belgium – Sarah-Maria Lux
Best in National Costume	Pakistan – Shafina Shah

== Candidates ==
Country or Territory	Contestants	Ages (Note: Ages during the competition)
Argentina	Micaela López Bianchi	34
Australia	Shirley Pulido Hadler	
Belgium	Sarah-Maria Lux	
Bolivia	Janella von Duker	
Brazil	Carina Villela Manzi	27
Cambodia	Brianna Mai	29
Chile	Camila Santiago	30
China	Yali Hu	25
Colombia	Laura Viviana Rentería Acevedo	27
Cuba	Donna Mujica	25
Denmark	Laura Schou	21
Dominican Republic	Chabeli María Tavera Peña	26
El Salvador	Andrea Morán Benítez	30
France	Elisa Mysyshyne	24
Georgia	Tata Gabidzashvili	
Germany	Lila Jostingmeier	
Gibraltar	Yanira Jiménez Peláez	
Great Britain	Ashley Lauren Powell	29
Honduras	Katherine Nicole Ponce Chávez	30
Hong Kong	Orange Ning	
Hungary	Sara Szigeti	
India	Apeksha Dabral	
Indonesia	Ilda Saduk	28
Kenya	Linet Kinya Muthomi	26
Lithuania	Raimonda Gecaite	26
Malaysia	Chun Joo Yee	30
Moldova	Kristina Sukhorukova	
Myanmar	Khin Myo Htwe	27
Namibia	Mirjam Sheehama	32
Pakistan	Shafina Shah	
Philippines	Maria Sesaldo Gigante	30
Poland	Laurien Polnau	29
Portugal	Raissa Cotrim Assunção	34
Puerto Rico	Elaine Marie Rosado Rivera	25
Russia	Marina Rolgeizer	27
Singapore	Jocilyn Chin	
Switzerland	Vanessa Mab Williams	27
Tahiti	Fanny Julien Salva	24
Thailand	Jennifer Panlita Gustavson	
United States	Lana Blum	
Venezuela	Lisandra María Chirinos Guillén	28
Vietnam	Bianca Huynh Nguyen	
Zimbabwe	Sindiso Ndlovu Foulkes	
