= Miss and Mister National Nepal =

Mister and Miss National Nepal
- Director: Santosh Upadhyaya
- Owner: Sanurvi Entertainment
- Memberships: Miss and Mister Supranational; Miss Intercontinental; Miss Charm; Mister International; The Miss Globe; Mister Tourism World

Miss and Mister National Nepal aka Miss and Mister Supranational Nepal is an annual national beauty pageant contest held in Nepal by Sanurvi Entertainment to select the Nepalese delegates to Miss and Mister Supranational and other international pageants.

== History ==
In 2016, Pooja Shrestha represented Nepal at Miss Supranational 2016. After two years, THT Miss Nepal started to send delegates regularly to Miss Supranational when Mahima Singh was crowned in 2018 and continued to select Miss Supranational Nepal till 2021.

When Dr. Santosh Upadhyaya won the Mister Supra-Star 2020 and got to represent Nepal at Mister Supranational 2021, he was awarded as 3rd Runner up of Mister Supranational 2021. He also acquired license for Mister and Miss Supranational Nepal and assumed the role of National Director. Later, he acquired the license of several other pageants and renamed the contest as Mister and Miss National Nepal. Currently it selects delegates for Miss and Mister Supranational, Miss Intercontinental, The Miss Globe and Mister International pageants. In 2024, the organization acquired the franchise of Mister Tourism World. In 2026, the organization acquired the license for Miss Charm.

== Miss National Nepal ==
=== Miss Supranational Nepal ===
Year	Miss Supranational Nepal	1st Runner Up	2nd Runner Up	Ref.
2026	Purnima Karki			
2025	Dikshya Awasthi	Sylvia Sharma	Yukta Singh	
2024	Sajina Khanal	Rajita Parajuli	Sanskriti Bhatta	
2023	Sama Parajuli	Sarosy Neupane	Sampada Ghimire	
2022	Keshu Khadka	Aditi Adhikari	Eri Tuladhar	

=== Franchised Titles ===
Year	Title	Delegate	Ref
2025	Miss Globe Nepal	Riju Bhattarai	
2024	Miss Globe Nepal	Monica Adhikari	
2024	Miss Intercontinental Nepal	Aayushnova Dhungana	
2023	Miss Globe Nepal	Roshani Chand	

== Mister National Nepal ==
=== Mister Supranational Nepal ===
Winners and runners up
Year	Mister Supranational Nepal	1st Runner Up	2nd Runner Up	Ref.
2026	Mridul Acharya			
2025	Cyrus Bishwakarma	Sijal Kapali	Azhar Alam	
2024	Dhiroj Kaji Basnet	Milan Bhattarai	Sandesh Sitaula	
2023	Shishir Wagle	Cyrus Bishwakarma	Milan Bhattarai	
2022	Sanish Shrestha	Anish Karki	Milan Bhattarai	

=== Franchised Titles ===
Year	Title	Delegate	Ref
2025	Mr. International Nepal	Siddartha Tamang	
2024	Mr. Tourism Nepal	Milan Bhattarai	
2024	Mr. International Nepal	Kshitiz Shrestha	
2023	Mr. International Nepal	Prajwol Tamrakar	
2022	Mr. International Nepal	Manash Kumar Rai	

== International Placement under Miss National Nepal ==
- : Declared as Winner
- : Ended as runner-up or top 5/6 qualification
- : Ended as one of the finalists or semifinalists
- : Ended as special award winner/ qualifier

=== Miss Supranational Nepal ===
Year	District / City	Miss Supranational Nepal	Placement at Miss Supranational	Special Awards
2026	Katari	Purnima Karki	Unplaced	From the Ground Up (Top 21)
2025	Kailali	Dikshya Awasthi	Top 24	
2024	Sarlahi	Sajina Khanal	Unplaced	Miss Talent (Top 20); Miss Influencer (Top 7)
2023	Pokhara	Sama Parajuli	Unplaced	Miss Talent (Top 29)
2022	Lalitpur	Keshu Khadka	Unplaced	Suprachat Winner (Group 7- Judges' Vote)

=== The Miss Globe Nepal ===
Year	District / City	Miss Globe Nepal	Placement at The Miss Globe	Special Awards
2025	Morang	Riju Bhattarai	Unplaced	
2024	Kathmandu	Monica Adhikari	Top 15	
2023	Dhangadhi	Roshani Chand	Unplaced	

=== Miss Intercontinental Nepal ===
Year	District / City	Miss Intercontinental Nepal	Placement at Miss Intercontinental	Special Award
2024	Kathmandu	Aayushnova Dhungana	Unplaced	

== International Placement under Mister National Nepal ==
- : Declared as Winner
- : Ended as runner-up or top 5/6 qualification
- : Ended as one of the finalists or semifinalists
- : Ended as special award winner/ qualifier

=== Mister Supranational Nepal ===
Year	District / City	Mister Supranational Nepal	Placement at Mister Supranational	Special Award
2026	Kathmandu	Mridul Acharya	Unplaced	Supra Chat Group 9 (Winner); Final Supra Chat (Top 10)
2025	Kathmandu	Cyrus Bishwakarma	Unplaced	Mister Talent (Top 5)
2024	Chitwan	Dhiroj Kaji Basnet	Top 20	Mister Talent (Top 10)
2023	Pokhara	Shishir Wagle	Unplaced	Mister Talent (Top 4)
2022	Kathmandu	Sanish Shrestha	Unplaced (Top 25- Non Semifinalist)	Mister Talent (Winner); Supra Influencer (Top 12); Supra Chat (Top 12)
2021	Achham	Santosh Upadhyaya	3rd Runner Up	Supra Influencer (Winner); Mister Talent (Top 5)

=== Mister International Nepal ===
Year	District / City	Mister International Nepal	Placement at Mister International	Special Award
2025	Kathmandu	Siddhartha Tamang	Unplaced	
2024	Kathmandu	Kshitiz Shrestha	Unplaced	
2023	Kathmandu	Prajwol Tamrakar	Unplaced	Mister Congeniality (Winner)
2022	Kathmandu	Manash Kumar Rai	Unplaced	

=== Mister Tourism Nepal ===
Year	District / City	Mister Tourism Nepal	Placement at Mister Tourism World	Special Award
2024	Gorkha	Milan Bhattarai	Top 20	Mister Photogenic (Winner)
