= Budhanilkantha =

Municipality in Bagmati Province, Nepal

Budhanilkantha Municipality बूढानीलकण्ठ नगरपालिका
- Municipality
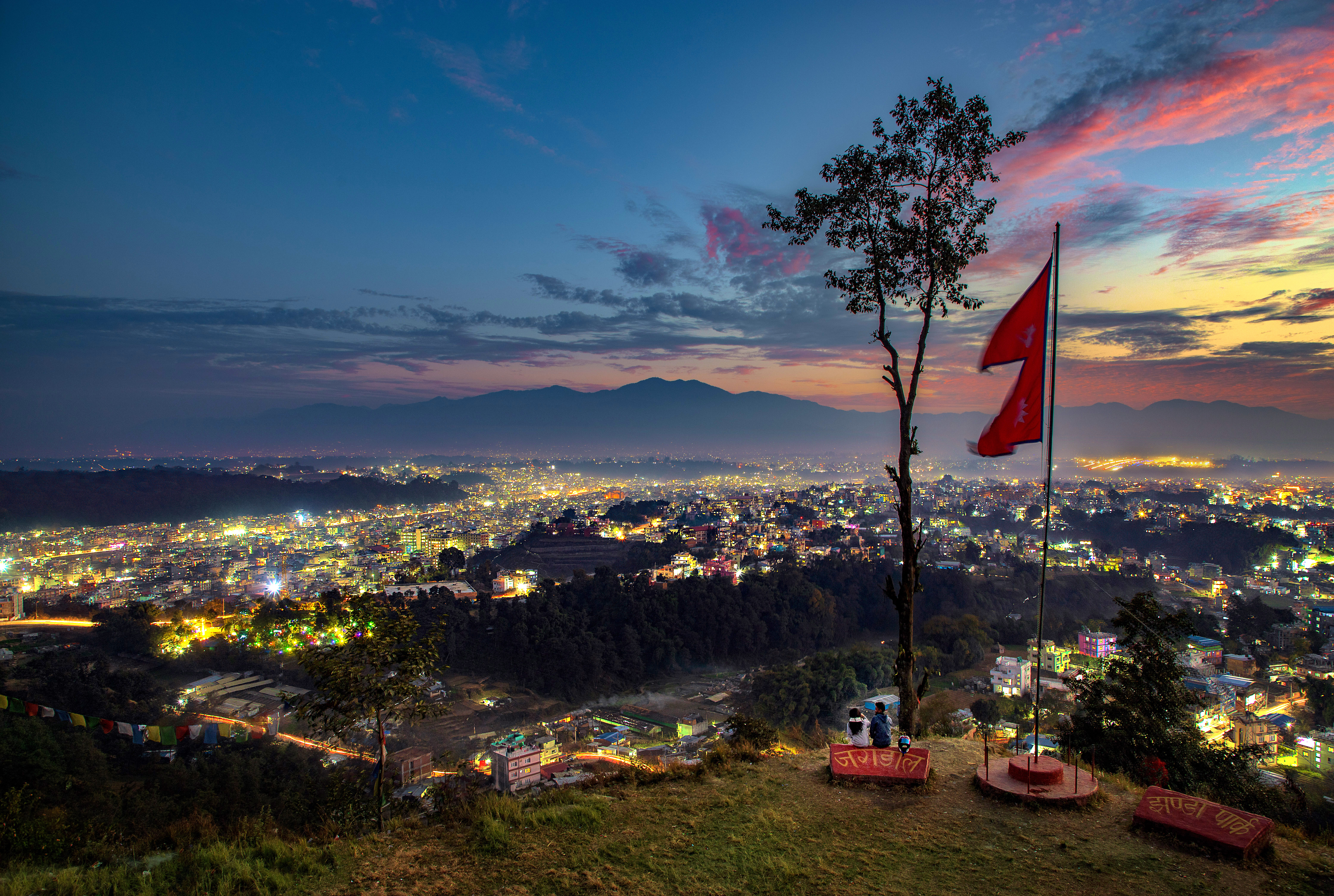
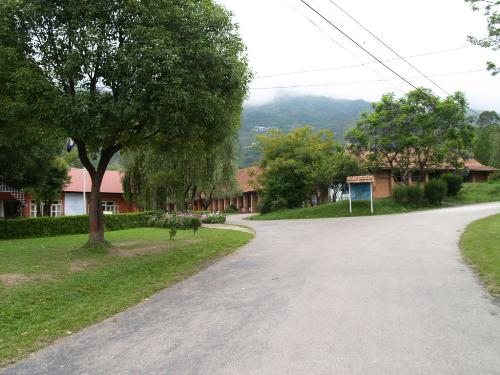
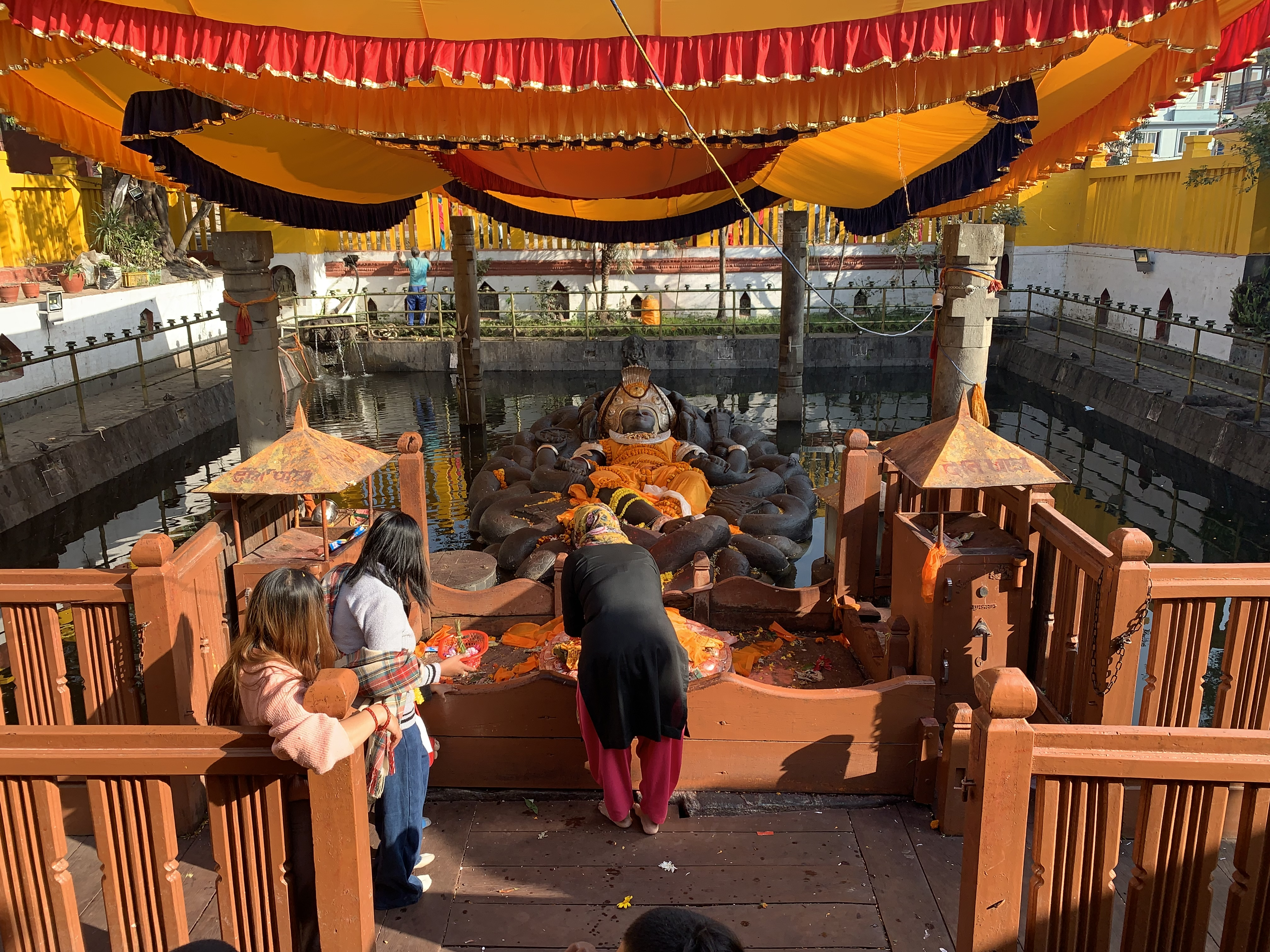
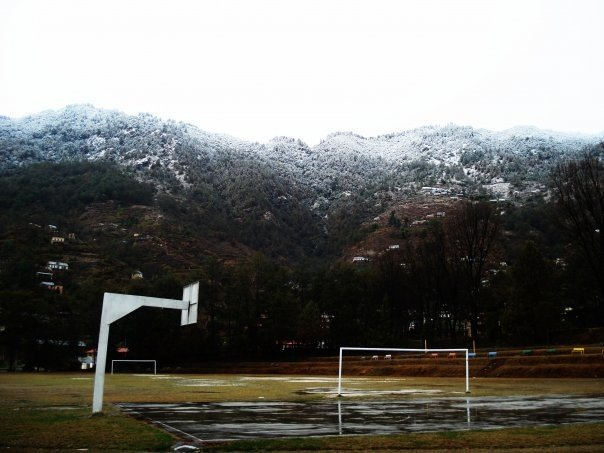
- From top, left to right: Budhanilkantha skyline from Jhanda Park, Budhanilkantha School, Budhanilkantha Temple, Snow clad Shivapuri hills seen from the playground.
- Interactive map of Budhanilkantha Municipality
- Location in Nepal Budhanilkantha Municipality (Nepal)
- Coordinates: 27°46′N 85°22′E
- Country: Nepal
- Zone: Bagmati
- District: Kathmandu
- Named for: Budhanilkantha Temple

Government
  - Mayor: Mitharam Adhikari (UML)
  - Deputy Mayor: Anita Lama (UML)

Area
  - Total: 34.8 km^{2} (13.4 sq mi)

Population (2021 Nepal census)
  - Total: 179,688
  - Rank: 14th (Nepal); 5th (Bagmati Province)
  - Density: 5,160/km^{2} (13,400/sq mi)
  - Ethnicities: Bahun Chhetri Newar Tamang Magar
  - Religions: Hindu Buddhist
- Time zone: UTC+5:45 (NST)
- Website: http://budhanilkanthamun.gov.np

Budhanilkantha (Nepali: बूढानीलकण्ठ) is a city and municipality in Kathmandu district of Bagmati province of Nepal. It is the 3rd largest city in the Kathmandu Valley after Kathmandu and Lalitpur. As per 2021 Nepal census, the city population was 179,688 and 26,678 households.

It was established on 2 December 2014 by merging the former Village development committees Hattigauda, Khadka Bhadrakali, Chapali Bhadrakali, Mahankal, Bishnu, Chunikhel and Kapan. The city is situated at the foot of Shivapuri hill. At the time of the 2011 Nepal census, the VDC of Budhanilkantha had a population of 15,421.

The municipality is named after the sacred Budhanilkantha Temple. The Budhanilkantha School is also located within the municipality.

== Toponymy ==
=== Linguistic origin ===
- Linguistic family: Indoeuropean
- Language: Sanskrit

=== Etymology ===
“Budha” means elderly person or, in a respectful sense, a way of referring to a deity. “Nilkantha” refers to Lord Shiva, the “blue-throated” god. The place is named after the large statue of Lord Nilkantha (Shiva) found there, combining “Budha” (deity) and “Nilkantha.”

Budha (बुढा) means “elder, old man” and comes from Nepali बुढा, which can also mean “venerable deity” in local usage; derived from Sanskrit वृद्ध (vṛddha) meaning “aged” or “respected elder". Nilkantha (नीलकण्ठ) means “blue throat” and comes from Sanskrit नील (nīla), meaning “blue” and कण्ठ (kaṇṭha) meaning “throat.” This is a well-known epithet of Shiva, referencing the myth where he drank poison during the churning of the ocean (samudra manthan). The toponym reflects both physical iconography (the statue) and religious reverence, combining local honorific usage with classical Sanskrit epithets.

== Gallery ==
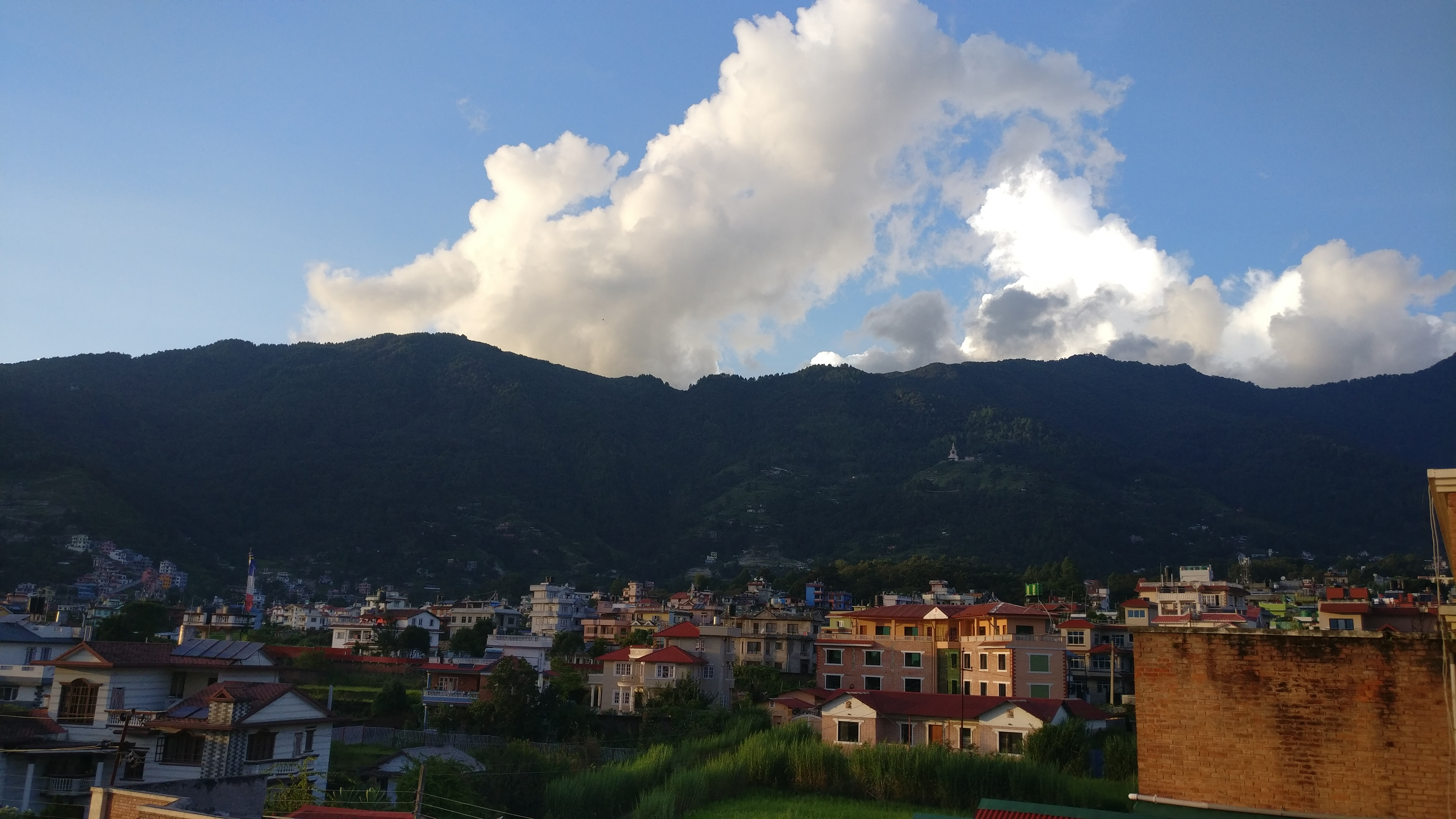
Budhanilkantha town at the foot of Shivapuri hills visible from a building terrace.

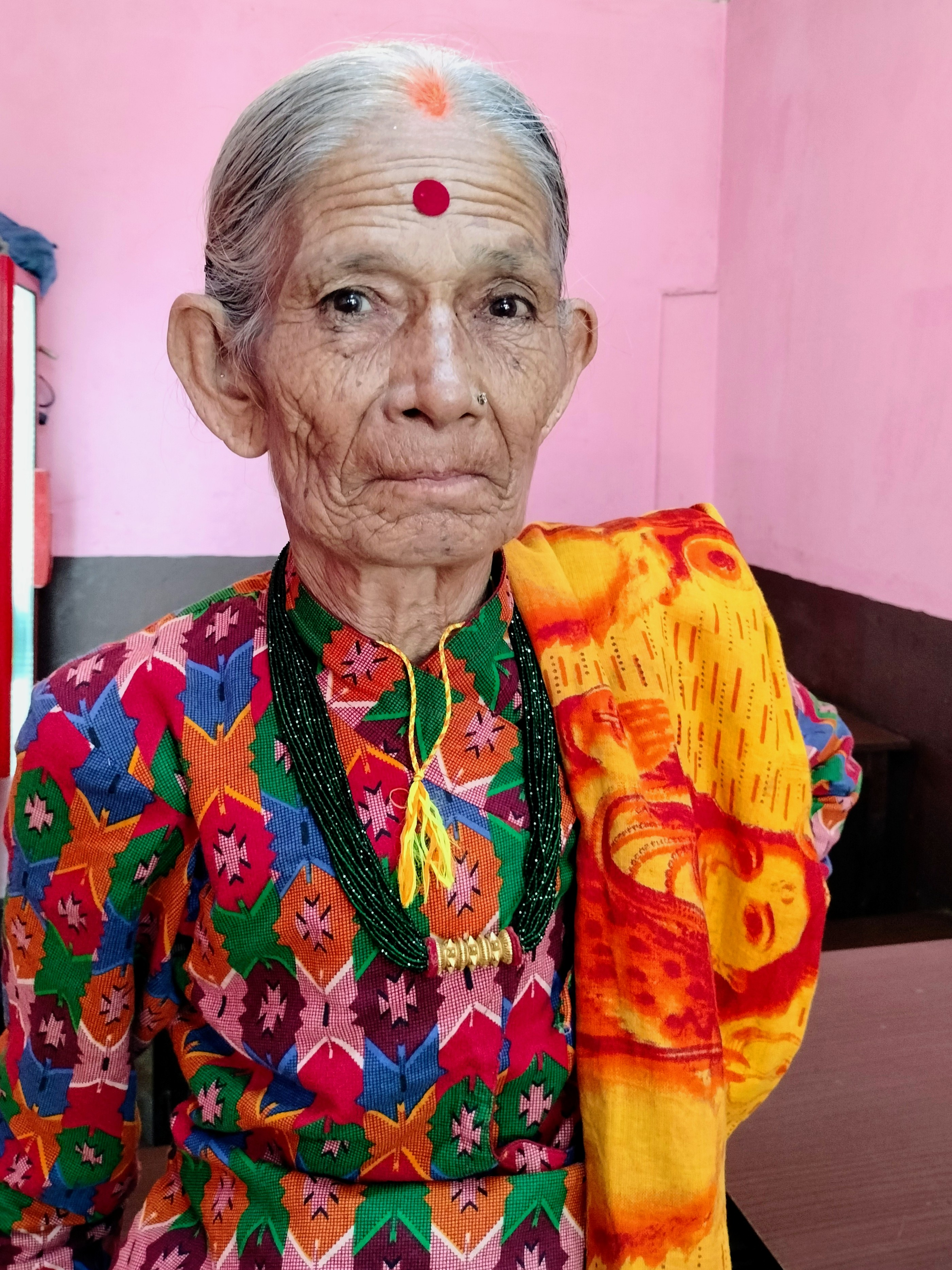
Old lady from Budhanilkantha.

== See also ==
- Shivapuri Nagarjun National Park
- Pasikot
