= AP1 TV =

- Country: Nepal
- Headquarters: Thapathali, Kathmandu, Nepal

Programming
- Language: Nepali
- Picture format: HDTV

Ownership
- Owner: Guna Group

History
- Launched: 31 March 2017

Links
- Website: Official website

AP1 TV (Nepali: एपिवान टेलिभिजन) is a television channel based in Kathmandu, Nepal owned by Guna Group. It was launched on March 31, 2017. The Executive chairman is Rajendra Shakya. AP1 HD provides a wide range of television shows, live broadcast, sports, and events around the country. The television network was under Annapurna Media Network earlier but the TV was brought under management of Guna Groups from 2026.

== TV shows on AP1 TV ==
AP1 TV is Nepal's first satellite HD television. It was also noted for its international franchise show Nepal Idol. AP1 TV announced their new shows on Shrawan 1st, 2077, featuring popular media personality Bhusan Dahal, Thakur Belbase, Prakash Subedi, singer Deepak Bajracharya, etc. joined AP1 TV. New shows include The Bravo Delta Show, Khullamanch, Junkiri Dohori, The Musical Medicine Show, Good Morning Nepal, Risani Maaf, Glamour Guff, Rajatpat, AP Bahas, Cine Mag etc. From November 1, 2020, AP1 TV started to broadcast Good Morning Nepal which is complete package of different genre of program. It includes following program which is broadcast live from 6:30 am to 9:30 am.

AP1 TV is known for its reality shows like Nepal Idol, Boogie Woogie, Ko Banchha Crorepati, Career Quiz, Public Speaker Nepal, The Idea Studio and Nepal Lok Star.

=== Beauty Pageant ===
AP1 TV has frequently streamed major international franchise beauty pageants and their television shows.

- Miss Universe Nepal 2020.
- Miss Universe Nepal 2024/ Road to Miss Universe Nepal.
- Miss Universe Nepal 2025 Reality Show, first ever beauty pageant Reality Show in Nepal.

=== Sports ===
After television was launched, it acquired broadcasting rights from ANFA, DPL, EPL, etc. in 2017. But it lost the broadcasting rights in 2019 due to time mismanagement.

Some sports tournament telecasted live was:

- Everest Premiere League
- Dhangadi Premiere League
- International Corporate Badminton Tournament
- Road to World Cup
- 2018 SAFF Championship
- Live Sports Event
- Pulsar Sahid Smarak A Division League
- 2019 South Asian Games

=== Shows announced but did not air ===
After the success of Nepal Idol Season 1, as per the demand of audience AP1 TV brought rights to Nepal's Got Talent from Fremantle Media. But was not able to air it since few audition clips were sent during online audition, making it a flop before telecasting. Also, the production company for Nepal's Cine Megastar was cancelled because of controversy. Ranabhumi was announced during test telecast but was not able to air it.

- Nepal's Got Talent
- Ranabhumi
- Nepal's Cine Megastar

== Team ==
- Rajendra Shakya - Executive Chairman
- Keshari Ballav Dahal - Business Head
