= Maria Gigante =

Filipino model

- Gigante in 2024
- Born: Maria Sesaldo Gigante; Cebu, Philippines
- Beauty pageant titleholder
- Title: Universal Woman Philippines 2024; Universal Woman 2024
- Major competitions: Binibining Pilipinas 2016 (Unplaced); Miss World Philippines 2022 (Top 11); Universal Woman 2024 (Winner)

Maria Sesaldo Gigante is a Filipina model, host and beauty pageant titleholder who was crowned Universal Woman 2024.

Gigante previously competed at Binibining Pilipinas 2016. In 2022 she joined Miss World Philippines 2022 where she finished as top 11 finalist. In 2024, she was appointed as Universal Woman Philippines 2024 in January 2024, where she competed and win the title of Universal Woman 2024. Gigante is now hosting national pageants like Miss Grand Philippines and Miss World Philippines.

In May 2025, she feted Pampanga-based model Keylyn Trajano as Universal Woman Arabia 2025.
