= Rajendra Bajgai =

Nepalese music director (born 1988)

Rajendra Bajgai राजेन्द्र बजगाई
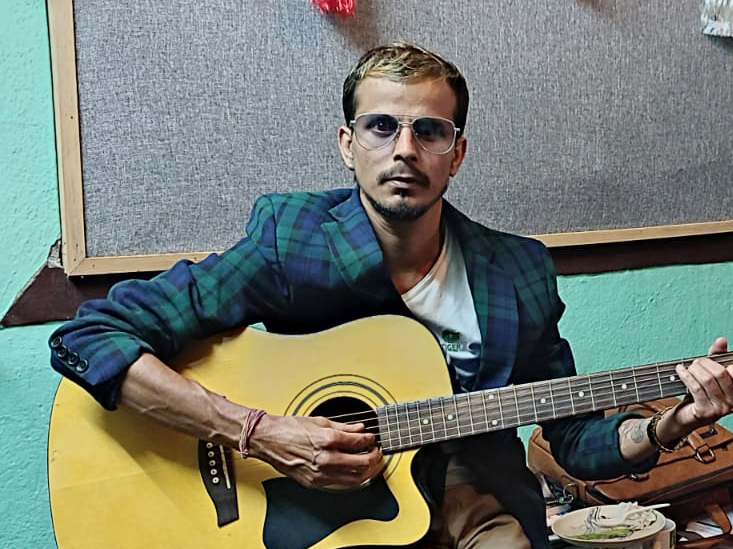

Background information
- Born: 27 March 1988 (age 37); Bariaya, Nepal
- Origin: Nepal
- Genres: Nepali modern songs
- Occupations: Composer, songwriter, singer, arranger, director
- Years active: 2007–Present

Rajendra Bajgai (Nepali: राजेन्द्र बजगाई) is a Nepalese musician, composer and songwriter of Nepal. He was born in 1988. He was from Baridya Nepal, and has been worked in more than 800 Nepali songs including 'Jala Joban' and 'O Mero Parana'.

== About ==
Musician Bajgai started his musical career in 2007. He has been worked with popular singers and songwriters of Nepal and his first Song“Kasle Choryo Othko Lali” was recorded in the year 2064BS . He has been honored for national musician contribution. Bajgai has been composed songs in Nepali as well as Hindi language. 'Musu Musu Hasera', 'Hari Bol', 'Jala Joban', 'O Mero Parana','Aama'are some Popular Songs which was composed by him.

He is awarded from different National Award including 'Kalika FM Music Award', Pim Nepal Film Festival Awards and others more.

== Songs ==
S.N	Songs Name	Song Type	Reference
1	Phulko Chot	Modern Song	
2	Aankhama Timi	Love Song	
3	Pokhreli	Lok Pop Song	
4	Kasai Lai Kushi Derai	Pop Song	
5	Khelau Holi	Cultural Song	
6	Tite Karela	Flok Song	
7	Sait Jurena	Flok Song	
8	Suger Free	Modern Nepali	
9	Barkhako Pani	Modern Song	
10	O Mero Parana	Movie Song	
11	Jala Jawana	Flok Song	
12	Meri Dalli	Modern Lok Song	
13	Aau Maya Sathai Ma	Dansing Song	
14	Musu Musu Hasera	Modern Song	

== Awards ==
=== Movie awards ===
S.N	Awards Name	Awards Category	Movie	Ref
1	Pim Nepal Film Festival Award- 2021	Best Music Director	Ma Ta Marchhu Ki Kya Ho	
2	Birat Music & Film Award -2078(B.S)	Best Music Director	Ma Ta Marchhu Ki Kya Ho	

=== Music awards ===
SN	Awards Name	Awards Category	Song
1	Kalika Film Music Awards-2072(B.S)	Best National Song	Yo Desh ko Lagi
2	Genius Music Award 2075(B.S)	Juri Award (Pop Song Composer)	Masta Jawani
3	Nim Awards - 2021	Best Music Arranger (Lok Pop)	Sait Jurena
4	National Music Awards- 2078(B.S)		
5	Nepal Music & Fashion Awards	Flok Music Best Composer	Sait Jurena
6	Pim Nepal Film Festival Awards	Best Composer	O Mero Parana
7	Kalika Music Awards	Best Lyric	Mero Desh
8	Quality Entertainment Awards 2078(BS)	Best Composer	O Mero Parana
10	Himalayan International Awards- 2022	Best Composer	O Mero Parana

== Organization Involved ==
SN	Organization Name	Role	ref
1	National Creator & Performer Academy	Chairmen	

== Honor ==
SN	Organization Name	Date	ref
1	Milap National Samman	2070(BS)	
2	Chhaya chhabi Prabidhik Samman	2078(BS)	
