= List of Nepalese actors =

This is a list of Nepali actors. Arranged alphabetically on basis of first letter of their surname.

== A ==
- Hari Bansha Acharya
- Nisha Adhikari
- Keki Adhikari

== B ==
- Anup Baral
- Nischal Basnet
- Biraj Bhatta
- Asha Bhusal
- Bijay Baral
- Gajit Bista

== C ==
- Sushil Chhetri

== D ==
- Neeta Dhungana

== G ==
- Kedar Ghimire
- Kunjana Ghimire
- Deepak Raj Giri
- Laxmi Giri
- Sipora Gurung
- Rishma Gurung

== H ==
- Rajesh Hamal
- Najir Hussain

== J ==
- Rabindra Jha
- Aashirman DS Joshi
- Ayushman Joshi
- Malina Joshi

== K ==
- Sushma Karki
- Priyanka Karki
- Sitaram Kattel
- Anmol K.C.
- Bhuwan K.C.
- Nandita K.C.
- Swastima Khadka
- Sumi Khadka
- Pradeep Khadka
- Manisha Koirala
- Raj Ballav Koirala

== L ==
- Dichen Lachman
- Khagendra Lamichhane
- Arunima Lamsal
- Jiwan Luitel

== M ==
- Krishna Malla
- Saugat Malla
- Gauri Malla
- Sharmila Malla
- Melina Manandhar
- Karishma Manandhar
- Zenisha Moktan

== N ==
- Tripti Nadakar
- Ashishma Nakarmi
- Jitu Nepal

== P ==
- Garima Panta
- Mariska Pokharel
- Sunil Pokharel
- Usha Poudel
- Deepika Prasain

== R ==
- Dayahang Rai
- Dilip Rayamajhi
- Wilson Bikram Rai
- Usha Rajak
- Sunil Rawal
- Manoj RC
- Hari Prasad Rimal
- Nima Rumba

== S ==
- Jal Shah
- Neer Shah
- Paul Shah
- Samragyee R.L. Shah
- Shiva Shankar
- Aanchal Sharma
- Anna Sharma
- Pooja Sharma
- Reecha Sharma
- Madan Krishna Shrestha
- Namrata Shrestha
- Prakriti Shrestha
- Shiv Shrestha
- Shree Krishna Shrestha
- Shristi Shrestha
- Aryan Sigdel
- Mahima Silwal
- Niruta Singh
- Barsha Siwakoti
- Malvika Subba

== T ==
- Suraj Singh Thakuri
- Upasana Singh Thakuri
- Arpan Thapa
- Bipana Thapa
- Jharna Thapa
- Rekha Thapa
- Sunil Thapa

== U ==
- Nikhil Upreti
- Ramesh Upreti

== See also ==
- Cinema of Nepal
- List of Nepal-related topics
