= Thakuri (surname) =

Surname list

Thakuri (ठकुरी) is a surname from Nepal. The surname originates from the Western Nepal. It is derived from the title Thakur, meaning "master of the estate". In Nepal, the Thakuri title is used by Khas & Magar communities.

== Notable people ==
- Aain Bahadur Shahi Thakuri, Nepali politician
- Abhishek Thakuri, Indian cricketer
- Jayanendra Chand Thakuri, Nepali actor
- Maya Thakuri, Nepali writer
- Ram Singh Thakuri, Indian soldier and musician
- Ramesh Chand Thakuri, Nepali police official
- Rohit Chand Thakuri, Nepali footballer
- Suraj Singh Thakuri, Nepali television presenter
- Sushila Sirpali Thakuri, Nepali politician
- Upasana Singh Thakuri, Nepali actress
