= Samikshya Adhikari =

Nepali singer

- Born: 18 July 2005 (age 20)
- Occupation: Singer

Samikshya Adhikari (Nepali: समीक्षा अधिकारी; born 18 July 2005) is a Nepalese singer. She rose to prominence as a singer following the release of her song "Balapan Ko Umer" from the Nepali movie Nai Nabhannu La 4.

== Controversy ==
Adhikari accused Nepali actor Paul Shah of rape and filed a case against, in it Durgesh Thapa also played a major role but he claimed to be neutral.

== Popular songs ==
- Dusman Hereko Herai (with Durgesh thapa, Eleena Chauhan)
- Bujhina Maile (Boksi Ko Ghar)
- Jale Rumal Fatyo (Kura Bujhna Parchha 2)
- Kura Bujhna Parchha
- China Ra Jokhana

== Awards ==
- Won: Nepal Music & Fashion Award
- Won: Nepal Best Music Award 2021
