= Jassita Gurung =

Nepalese-British actress (born 1996)

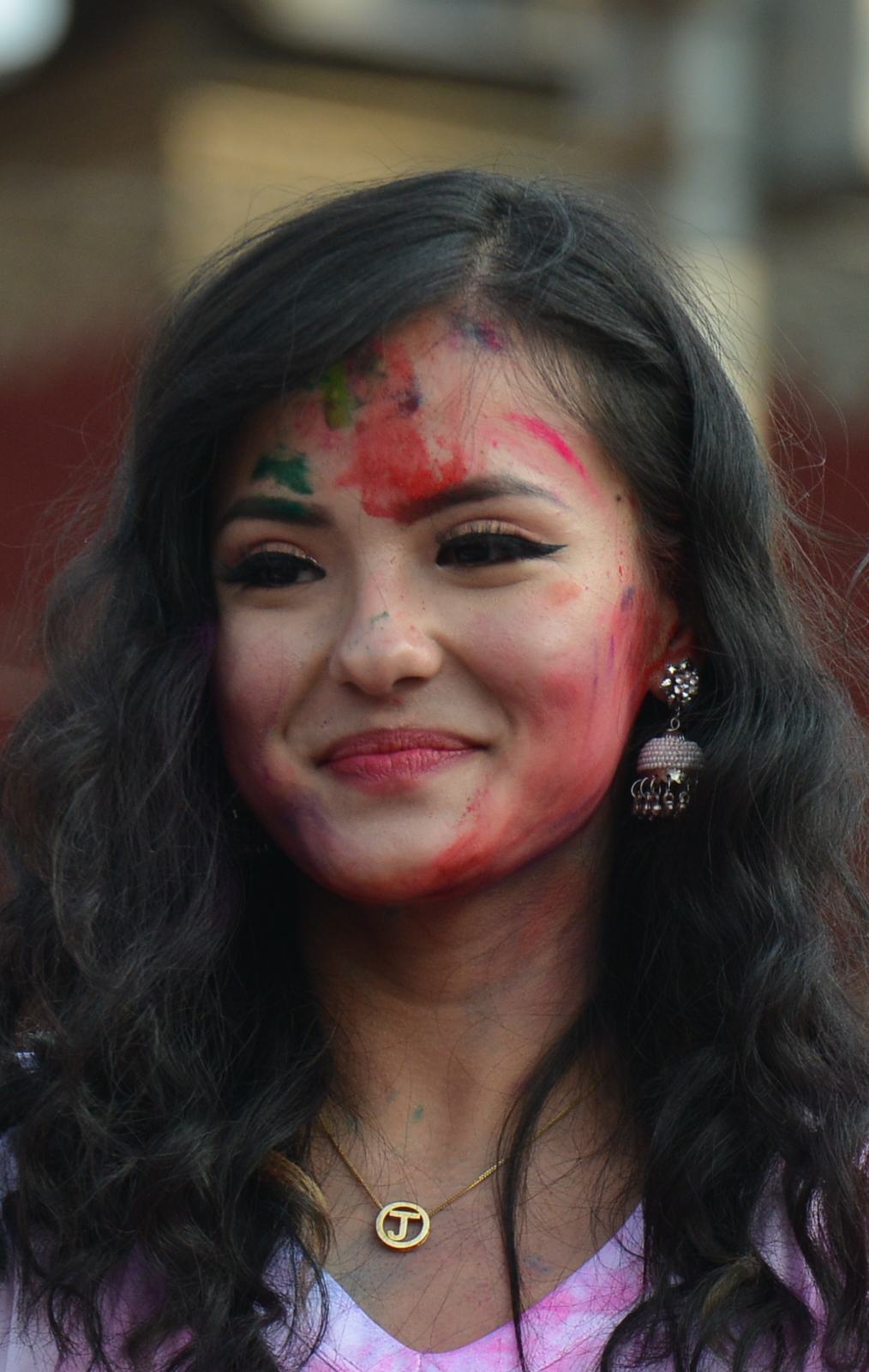
- Gurung celebrating Holi festival in Kathmandu (2019)
- Born: May 16, 1996 (age 30); Pokhara, Nepal
- Education: Henry Beaufort School
- Alma mater: Peter Symonds College
- Occupation: Actor
- Years active: 2018–present
- Height: 5 ft 5 in (165 cm)

Jassita Gurung (Nepali: जस्सिता गुरुङ, born on May 16, 1996, in Pokhara, Nepal) is a Nepalese origin British actress and model.

She made her film debut in 2018 in the movie Lily Bily. Gurung is known for her roles in Lily Bily, with Pradeep Khadka, and Love Station.

== Life ==
Jassita Gurung was born in Nepal, but grew up in the UK with her parents and close relatives. Her father is a retired British Army officer, and her mother is a homemaker. She has a brother named Ajay Gurung and a sister named Nicky Gurung.

In 2018 (2075 in the Nepali calendar) she received two awards as Best debut actress for her role as Shurtee in Lily Bily.

She is currently a judge in Super Dancer Nepal, alongside Suren Rai and Saroj Khanal.

== Filmography ==
Key
†	Denotes films that have not yet been released

Year	Film	Role	Notes
2018	Lily Bily	Shurtee	
2019	Love Station	Rani	
2022	Jackie I am 21	Ruby	
2024	Farki Farki	Sayera	
2025	Jerry on Top	Pema	

== Awards ==
Year	Nominated work	Category	Result	Notes
2026	Jerry on Top	Karnali International Film Festival – Best Actress	Won	
2018	Lilly Billy	Dcine Award 2075 – Best Debut Actor (Female)	Won	
2018	Lilly Billy	Kamana Film Award 2075 – Best Debut Actor (Female)	Won	
