= Prem Geet 3 =

2022 Nepalese film directed by Chhetan Gurung and Santosh Sen

- Theatrical release poster
- Nepali: प्रेम गीत ३
- Directed by: Chhetan Gurung; Santosh Sen
- Written by: Mandip Gautam; Chhetan Gurung
- Screenplay by: Chhetan Gurung
- Produced by: Santosh Sen; Prashant Kumar Gupta; Subhash Kale; Sushama Shiromanee
- Starring: Pradeep Khadka; Kristina Gurung; Shiva Shrestha; Sunil Thapa
- Cinematography: Purushottam Pradhan; Rajesh Shrestha
- Edited by: Bhupendra Adhikari; Banish Shah; Sanjay Sankla
- Music by: Kalyan Singh; Alish Karki; Aslam Keyi
- Production companies: Aasusen Films Production (Nepal); Sparkling Studio (India); Reltic Pictures (India)
- Distributed by: Gobinda Shahi; Byankates Entertainment
- Release date: September 23, 2022
- Running time: 130 minutes
- Countries: Nepal; India
- Language: Nepali
- Box office: रू39.7 crore (US$2.6 million)

Prem Geet 3 (Nepali: प्रेम गीत ३) is a 2022 Nepali language film, also dubbed and released in Hindi over Nepal and India, directed by Chhetan Gurung and Santosh Sen under the banner of Aasusen Films Production (Nepal), Reltic Pictures (India) and Sparkling Studio (India). It is the first Indo-Nepali joint production film; the first film to be released in both Nepali and Hindi simultaneously. It was expected to be released in 80 to 90 countries and in 500 to 1,000 cinema halls in India. Sen made his directorial debut through this film. The film was released on September 23, 2022. The majority of the filming took place in upper Manang with the remaining taking place on sets built in Kritipur. The film features Pradeep Khadka, Kristina Gurung, Shiva Shrestha, and Sunil Thapa in lead role. Gurung made her debut through this film; she was selected after outperforming the other 27,013 participants at the audition.

Earlier films in the franchise, Prem Geet and Prem Geet 2 were huge commercial success. Prem Geet 3 claims to have sold its distribution rights in India for ₹4 crore. The film was renamed Vishwajitam for Hindi version, but it was later changed back to Prem Geet 3. The film is also set to be released in China in Chinese language.

Prem Geet 3 is made on a budget of NRs. 4 crore, making it one of the most expensive Nepali film; the film was initially scheduled to release on April 10, 2020, and then rescheduled to February 25, 2021. However, both releases were postponed due to the COVID-19 pandemic's aftermath shutting many cinemas in the country.

Prem Geet 3 broke several box-office records and grossed over रू 39 crore globally and became the all-time highest grossing Nepali film worldwide in the history of Nepalese cinema surpassing recently released Kabaddi 4: The Final Match

== Premise ==
It is a historical action film with a plot set on a two hundred year old love story.

== Plot ==
Prem, the younger prince of the Kingdom of Khazaag, was born in an auspicious astrological time to be the future King. During this he goes through his biggest obstacle in life. Geet, his only love.

== Cast ==
- Pradeep Khadka as Prem
  - Anubhav Regmi as young Prem
- Kristina Gurung as Geet
  - Yogisha Khatri as young Geet
- Shiva Shrestha
- Sunil Thapa
- Santosh Sen as Angat
- Maotse Gurung
- Manish Raut as Aman
- Puskar Karki
- Prem Puri
- Yogisha Khatri
- Sambridhi Shahi Thakuri
- Krijan Gautam
- Jivan Baral
- Jiban Bhattarai
- Laxmi Bardewa
- Sujal Basnet
- Raj Thapa

== Production ==
- Chhetan Gurung - director, writer
- Santosh Sen - director, producer
- Mandip Gautam - writer
- Banish Shah - editor
- Bhupendra Adhikari - editor
- Kalyan Singh - music composer
- Alish Karki - music composer

== Soundtrack ==
=== Nepali ===
No.	Title	Lyrics	Music	Singer(s)	Length
1.	"Har Yug Hos"	Rohit Gupta	Alish Karki	Pratap Das, Prabisha Adhikari	4:56
2.	"Hatti Dhungama"	Hark Saud	Kalyan Singh	Sagar Ale, Melina Rai	4:44
3.	"Maya Ko Gaun"	Bishnu Bhandari	Saroj Pokharel	Pratap Das	3:23
Total length:					13:03

=== Hindi ===
No.	Title	Lyrics	Music	Singer(s)	Length
1.	"Koi Na Koi Naata Hai"	Ruby Fulara & Subhash Kale	Pawandeep Rajan	Jubin Nautiyal	4:50
2.	"Jahan Bhi Jao Aai Sanam Bas Tu Hi Tu"	Hari Shankar Sufi	DH Hrmony	Rahat Fateh Ali Khan	5:37
3.	"Tum Pyaar Ho"	Kumaar	Aslam Keyi	Palak Muchhal, Ankit Tiwari	3:58
4.	"Mujh Mein Bas Jana"	A.M. Turaz	Kalyan Singh	Palak Muchhal, Dev Negi	4:56
Total length:					19:21

== Reception ==
As of September 25, 2022, Prem Geet 3 is rated 8.7/10 in IMDb, a movies review aggregator website, and 97% of Google Users who have watched the movie liked it. These statistics are subject to change in the near future. Likewise, the Times of India rated it 4.8 out of 5.

== Accolades ==
Year	Awards	Category	Nominee	Result	Ref(s)
2022	Global Taj International Film Festival	Debut Actor Male (Hindi Version)	Pradeep Khadka	Won	
