= Bir Bikram =

Bir Bikram may refer to:

- Bir Bikram Kishore Manikya Bahadur, the maharaja (king) of the Indian princely state of Tripura
- Maharaja Bir Bikram Airport, Agartala, Tripura, India
- Maharaja Bir Bikram University, Agartala, Tripura, India
- Maharaja Bir Bikram College, Agartala, Tripura, India
- Bir Bikrama Jang Bahadur Shah Deva Shah, Nepalese royal title:
  - Birendra of Nepal, King of Nepal from 1972 to 2001
  - Mahendra of Nepal, King of Nepal from 1955 to 1972
- Bir Bikram (film), a 2016 Nepalese romantic comedy film
  - Bir Bikram 2, its 2019 sequel

== See also ==
- Bir Bikrom, third highest gallantry award in Bangladesh
- Veer Vikram Singh, Indian politician, member of the Uttar Pradesh Legislative Assembly from Shahjahanpur
