= Bir Bikram (film) =

2016 Nepalese blockbuster film directed by Milan Chams

- Theatrical release poster of Bir Bikram
- Nepali: बिर बिक्रम
- Directed by: Milan Chams
- Screenplay by: Samrat Basnet
- Story by: Yam Thapa
- Produced by: UB Chams; Milan Chams
- Starring: Dayahang Rai; Anoop Bikram Shahi; Deeya Pun; Arpan Thapa; Najir Hussain; Shishir Rana; Basanta Bhatta
- Cinematography: Ram KC
- Edited by: Arjun G.C.
- Music by: Tara Prakash Limbu
- Production company: Chams Entertainment Pvt.Ltd
- Distributed by: London Cine Eye Production
- Release date: 19 August 2016 (Nepal)
- Running time: 136 minutes
- Country: Nepal
- Language: Nepali

Bir Bikram (Nepali: बिर बिक्रम, romanized: Bira Bikrama) is a 2016 romantic comedy film directed by Milan Chams. This movie features Nepalese actors Dayahang Rai, Anoop Bikram Shahi, Deeya Pun, Arpan Thapa, Menuka Pun and Najir Hussain in the lead roles.

The movie tells a story about best friends who get separated when they are young but later reunite, with the same dreams they used to have.

Bir Bikram was released on 19 August 2018 to mixed critical reception, with the film's narration and screenplay receiving negative response but the performances of Dayahang Rai, Najir Hussain and Arpan Thapa, the music and the cinematography receiving praise. The film was commercially successful at box office. A sequel, titled Bir Bikram 2, part of the Bir Bikram series and featuring Paul Shah, Barsha Siwakoti and Najir Hussain in lead roles, was released on 17 May 2019.

== Plot ==
Bir (Dayahang Rai) and Bikram (Anoop Bikram Shahi) are two best friend, but they have different thoughts about what they are going to be when they are getting older.

Bir tries to help Bikram when Bikram doesn't have any money to educate himself but they separate from each other when they are six years old but Bir gives him a one-rupee coin which has text saying "Bir Bikram".

After parting, Bir becomes a country boy (farmer) but Bikram becomes a teacher with a degree in Kathmandu. After a while Bikram returns to see Bir in the village but both don't recognize each other. But Bikram decides to get him a girlfriend which Bir loves.

Joon (Deeya Pun) and Bir (Dayahang Rai) love each other but Bir doesn't express his feeling to Joon because he had promised Bikram he will keep Joon safe. But Joon had forgotten everything about Bikram since he had left her when she was young. When Bikram arrives at the villages he decides to do something nice for him to get Joon and Bir together. When trying to get them each other Bikram has to become a villain of Bir but he finally unites them.

Aaitey (Arpan Thapa) is the richest guy on the village and he loves Joon, but Joon doesn't like Aaitey. Aaitey brings a road to the village which got him a lot of money from people and respect.

Man Bahadur Bishwokarma also known as Maney (Najir Hussain) is a storyteller of the village he tells everyone what happening to each other but they have pay him to know the full story. But he has a pregnant sister who isn't accepted by the society in the village but Bir settles the controversy about his sister.

At the middle of movie Bir's mother dies; Bir gets so upset about this he goes every where to find money to pay for her funeral then he decides to sell a donkey which had been with him since he was 18.

Aaitey (Arpan Thapa) approaches Joon's father for an Arranged marriage but he gets denied by Joon but her father accepts because he wants to see his daughter at better place because he is the wealthy person on the village and pays Joon's father million rupees and promises to keep her as queen, but she decides to run away with Bir. While she was with Bir, Aaitey attacks Bir nearly leading to his death but Bikram saves him.

== Cast ==
- Dayahang Rai as Bir
- Anoop Bikram Shahi as Bikram
- Deeya Pun as Joon
- Arpan Thapa as Aaitey
- Najir Hussain as Man Bahadur Bishwokarma or Maney
- Shishir Rana as Joon's Father
- Basanta Bhatta as Prime Minister of the village

== Production ==
Chams Entertainment announced to make Bir Bikram on 18 August 2015 and written by Yam Thapa also directed by Milan Chams. And the whole movie was set in Dolkha and Ramechhap District, Nepal.

== Release ==
In 2015 Chams Entertainment announced this movie was released on 19 August 2016 and premiered in the UK on 4 April 2016 with Dayahang Rai, then in Australia.

== Music ==
Bir Bikram

Soundtrack album by Tara Prakash Limbu
- Released: 18 August 2016
- Recorded: 2016
- Venues: Kathmandu, Nepal
- Genre: Feature Film Soundtrack
- Length: 11m 34s
- Language: Nepali
- Label: OSR Digital
- Director: Milan Chams
- Producer: Milan Chams

No.	Title	Singer(s)	Length
1.	"Sare Sare"	Tara Prakash Limbu, Dipa Lama	3:33
2.	"Tal Tal Talkine"	Rajesh Payal Rai, Anila Rai	4:42
3.	"Najika Hudai Chu"	Tara Prakash Limbu, Prabisha Adhikari	3:59
Total length:			11:34

The song Sare Sare describes the love between Bir and Joon. Tal Tal Talkine describes the story about the culture and love. Najika Hudai Chu describes the love between Bikram and Joon. The songs were written by Dinesh Raut, Nirmala Rai Paribesh and Yaman Subedi and sung by Rajesh Payal Rai, Tara Prakash Limbu, Deepa Lama, Prabisha Adhikari, Anila Rai and Amrita Limbu.

== Reception ==
Online Khabar called the movie "unpolished storytelling," It received mixed reviews from critics.
