= Ek Mutthi Badal =

Ek Mutthi Badal: My Share of Sky
- एक मुठ्ठी बादल
- Directed by: Sahara Sharma
- Written by: Sahara Sharma
- Produced by: Abhimanyu Dixit
- Starring: Aanchal Sharma; Sahayog Adhikari; Nisha Sharma; Sekhar Chapagain; Usha Rajak; Manish Niraula; Asmita Gautam; Gaurav Bista
- Cinematography: Linh Dan Nguyen Phan
- Distributed by: RR Films
- Release date: May 15, 2026 (Nepal)
- Countries: Nepal, Germany
- Language: Nepali
- Box office: 5.21 Lakhs

Ek Mutthi Badal: My Share of Sky(Nepali: एक मुठ्ठी बादल) is a 2026 Nepali family drama film written and directed by Sahara Sharma. It is produced by Abhimanyu Dixit under Gauthali Entertainment and is an international co-production between Nepal and Germany. The film is scheduled for theatrical release in Nepal on 15 May 2026.

== Plot ==
The story takes place in a town in Nepal when it is time for weddings. It happens in one day when three generations of a family come together in one house. The main person is a woman from a middle class family. She is trying to deal with what her family wants her to do and what she wants for herself. As they get ready for the wedding people in the family start to talk about things that have been bothering them for a time. The movie looks at how women in the family do a lot of work at home without getting credit. They help keep the family but often they do not feel like they are really part of it. The film is about women, like this and the wedding is the start.

== Cast ==
- Aanchal Sharma as Maili (lead)
- Sahayog Adhikari
- Nisha Sharma as the family matriarch (her first screen appearance in over thirty years)
- Sekhar Chapagain as the patriarch
- Usha Rajak
- Manish Niraula
- Asmita Gautam
- Gaurav Bista
- Abiral Pratap Adhikari
- Bheema Mainali

== Production ==
=== Development and Financing ===
The project was selected for the NFDC Film Bazaar Co-production Market in 2021, where producer Abhimanyu Dixit won the Rotterdam Lab Award, recognising him as an emerging South Asian Producer to attend the Rotterdam Lab Programme at the international Film Festival Rotterdam 2022.

In 2024, the film was selected for the Hubert Bals Fund and Eu Post-production Grant, receiving €60,000 in financial support.

Co-producer Sara Fazilat who is known for her work on Nico (2021 Film) and Holy Spider (2022), joined the project after meeting producer Abhimanyu Dixit at the Rotterdam Lab 2022.

=== Filming ===
The film was shot over 22 days in Lamachaur and surrounding areas of Pokhara, with production beginning on 8 March, International Women's Day.

The film brought together a predominantly female crew across most creative departments.

- Linh Dan Nguyen Phan, the first Vietnamese woman to shoot a feature film who served as a cinematographer, her seventh feature overall.
- Yashasvi Sabharwal, whose production design work on All We Imagine as Light helped earn that film the Grand Prix at Cannes, handle production design.

Other female department heads include Agrani Thakuri Jha(art director), Priyanka Gaikwad (location audio), Janaki Kadayat (costume design), Kriti Jhosi (makeup), and Myrhna James (chief assistant director)

=== Teaser ===
The film's teaser features actress Aanchal Sharma reciting a poem titled Pompeiko Phool (The Flower of Pompeii). The poem originated from director Sahara Sharma childhood memories of hearing similar verses from her grandmother. The idea for the poem emerged during the film's editing stage.

== Co-production ==
Ek Mutthi Badal is described as Nepal's first-ever woman-led international co-production. The production companies involved are Gauthali Entertainment and Mana Production(Nepal), Underground Talkies(Nepal), Third Culture Kids (Germany), and Chromosom Film GmbH (Germany).

The film is presented by Mana Production and distributed in Nepal by RR Films.

== Release ==
The theatrical release date of 15 May 2026 (Jestha 1, 2083 BS) was announced by Gauthali Entertainment on International Women's Day, 8 March 2026.

== Background ==
Director Sahara Sharma is the founder of Gauthali Entertainment, a Kathmandu-based media company co-founded with filmmaker and educator Abhimanyu Dixit. Her debut film Chasing Rainbows(2013), which addressed themes of sexuality, migration, and depression among Nepali youth, opened the Kathmandu International Mountain Film Festival and won in the Nepal Panorama category, making Sharma the youngest female director to do so. The film also received the Critics' Award at the Toronto Film Festival (2014).
