= Love Station =

Love Station may refer to:

- Love Station (2016 film), an Indian film directed by Ashok Pati
- Love Station (2019 film), a Nepalese film directed by Ujwal Ghimire
- Love Station (1993 film), a Kazakh film starring Bayan Yessentayeva
- Lovestation, a British electronic dance music group
- "Love Station", a song by Lim Young-woong from Im Hero, 2022
