= Khusma =

- Nepali: खुस्मा
- Directed by: Ashok Thapa Magar
- Written by: Ashok Thapa Magar
- Based on: Social Drama
- Produced by: Bir Bahadur Lama . Chandra Bhattchan . Betany Magar (Babita Rana) . Man Bahadur Dhanha Magar . Sushmita Budhathoki
- Starring: Dhiraj Magar. Upasana Sing Thakuri
- Cinematography: Deepak Bajracharya
- Music by: SD Yogi(Rukum Maikot & Khusika Phool Batulera) , Sarit Rai (Aaitho Bho Maya)
- Distributed by: Kabiya and Kuber Distributor
- Release date: September 19, 2024
- Running time: 147 mins
- Country: Nepal
- Language: Nepali
- Budget: est.रू2.5 crore (equivalent to ₹0.00 or US$0.00 in 2026)
- Box office: est.रू4.5 crore (equivalent to ₹0.00 or US$0.00 in 2026)

Khusma (Nepali :खुस्मा) is a 2024 Nepali social drama film, written and directed by Ashok Thapa Magar. It is produced by Chandra Bhattachan, Man Bahadur Dhanha Magar, Bir Bahadur Lama, Betany Magar. Rukum Maikot is the most popular song of this movie.

== Synopsis ==
Khusma is a Nepali romantic social drama set in a rural Magar community, depicting a love story influenced by traditional social values and personal relationships.The film is set against the socio-political backdrop of Nepal during the period of the People’s War, reflecting how conflict affects everyday life in rural communities.The narrative follows the emotional journey of its central characters as their relationship faces challenges arising from separation, social responsibilities, and external circumstances.Through its portrayal of love and sacrifice amid political instability, Khusma highlights the human impact of conflict on relationships and social structures in Nepal. This move was produced under the banner of M Media Pvt. Ltd, with publicity handled by Trident Concept.

== Cast ==
Cast Details is taking from this reference

- Dhiraj Magar – Lead Actor
- Upasana Singh Thakuri – Lead Actress
- Maotse Gurung
- Raj Thapa Kaucha
- Bijay Sanyok Subba
- Sujata Rai
- Astitwa Bhattachan
- Arun Magar
- Raju Regmi Magar
- Sangita Thapa
- Sarda Rai
- Bebek Buda Magar
- Shwetaa Mistra
- Sajan Thapa Magar
- Duisang Theeng
- Mahesh Baral
- Chetana Budha
- Mira Gurung
- Bishal Pun ‘Aashish’
- Dhundiraj Pun

== Soundtrack ==
No.	Title	Writer(s)	Singer	Length
1.	"Rukum Maikot "	Surendra Rana	SD Yogi, Shanti Shree Pariyar	5:16
2.	"Aaitho Bho Maya"	Shailesh Giri	Gitanjali Thapa Magar	4:59
3.	"Khusika Phool Batulera"	Ram Abiral Bista	SD Yogi, Bigyani Parajuli	5:31
