= Jerry on Top =

- Theatrical release poster
- Directed by: Suyog Gurung
- Screenplay by: Biswas Timshina
- Story by: Hem Raj BC
- Produced by: Bhabishya Khadka; Robin Sherchan; Deepak Bhandari; Ananya Neupane
- Starring: Anmol KC; Aanchal Sharma; Jassita Gurung; Kedar Ghimire
- Cinematography: Duleep Regmi
- Edited by: Nimesh Shrestha
- Music by: Roman Bajracharya
- Production company: Ananya Films Production
- Distributed by: Richa Entertainment; FD Company; Apple Entertainment
- Release date: 17 October 2025
- Running time: 175 minutes
- Country: Nepal
- Language: Nepali
- Budget: est.रू7 crore (US$450,000)
- Box office: est.रू22.73 crore (US$1.5 million)

Jerry on Top (Nepali: जेरी अन टप) is a 2025 Nepalese romantic adventure-drama film directed by Suyog Gurung, from a story by Hem Raj BC and a screenplay by Biswas Timshina. Produced by Ananya Films Production, it serves as the spiritual successor of the 2014 film Jerryy. The film features Anmol KC, Aanchal Sharma, Jassita Gurung and Kedar Ghimire. With a love story set in the Everest expedition, it is one of the first mainstream Nepali productions to portray Mt Everest as the focus of the story highlighting the significance and challenges of the Himalayan region.

The film released on October 17, 2025, in cinemas across Nepal, few days before the Tihar festival. It received mixed response from the critics, with praise directed towards the cinematography, performances, visual effects and production value while it was criticised for predictable plot, shoddy storytelling, clumsy writing and amateurish direction. It opened to huge response from audience criticially and also at the box office and went on to become one of the highest grossing film of the year and all time and also highest grossing film in Anmol KC's career.

== Synopsis ==
Jerry, the privileged son of a powerful business tycoon, embarks on a difficult mission to climb Mount Everest. His motivation is a mix of personal ambition, a desire for self-discovery, and a need to redeem his father's unfulfilled dream.

On his challenging Everest expedition, he is guided by Pema, a mysterious Sherpa and trekking guide. The journey is not just a physical ascent but also an emotional one, as Jerry is torn between his ambition, his deep connection with Pema, and his relationship with his girlfriend, Shreya. The mountain ascent forces Jerry to confront themes of legacy, pride, and ultimately a journey toward maturity and self-awareness, with a major emotional turning point involving an act of sacrifice. The film blends action-adventure, romance, and drama against the visually stunning backdrop of the Himalayan region.

== Cast ==
- Anmol KC as Jayveer "Jerry" Rana
- Aanchal Sharma as Shreya
- Jassita Gurung as Pema
- Kedar Ghimire
- Bhuwan KC
- Usha Khadgi
- Surakshya Panta
- Nirmal Sharma

== Soundtrack ==
The soundtrack of the film features music composed by Kali Prasad Baskota, SD Yogi, Jayan J Waiba, John Chamling Rai and Brijesh Shrestha. Roman Bajracharya provided the background score of the film.

No.	Title	Lyrics	Music	Singer(s)	Length
1.	"Kastoori"	Jayan J Waiba	Jayan J Waiba	Ashish Gubhaju, Sadeekcshya Kattel	4:51
2.	"Kurauni"	Kali Prasad Baskota	Kali Prasad Baskota	Kali Prasad Baskota, Somea Baraili	4:03
3.	"Aamaile Bhanthe"	Biraj Gautam	Brijesh Shrestha	Biraj Gautam, Rajesh Payal Rai, Annu Dhakal	4:01
4.	"Aunthi Chino"	Rajesh Aryal	Sushant Gautam, Rikesh Gurung	SD Yogi	3:55
Total length:					16:50

== Box office ==
The film earned रू6.51 crore in the first 9 days of its release in Nepal. It grossed रू10.51 crore after 16 days, becoming the highest grossing film of Anmol KC's career. It minted रू11.71 crore after 23 days. After 37 days, it earned रू12.20 in Nepal to become one of the highest grossing film of the year.
