= Everest Surya Bohara =

Nepalese director

- एभरेष्ट सूर्य बोहरा
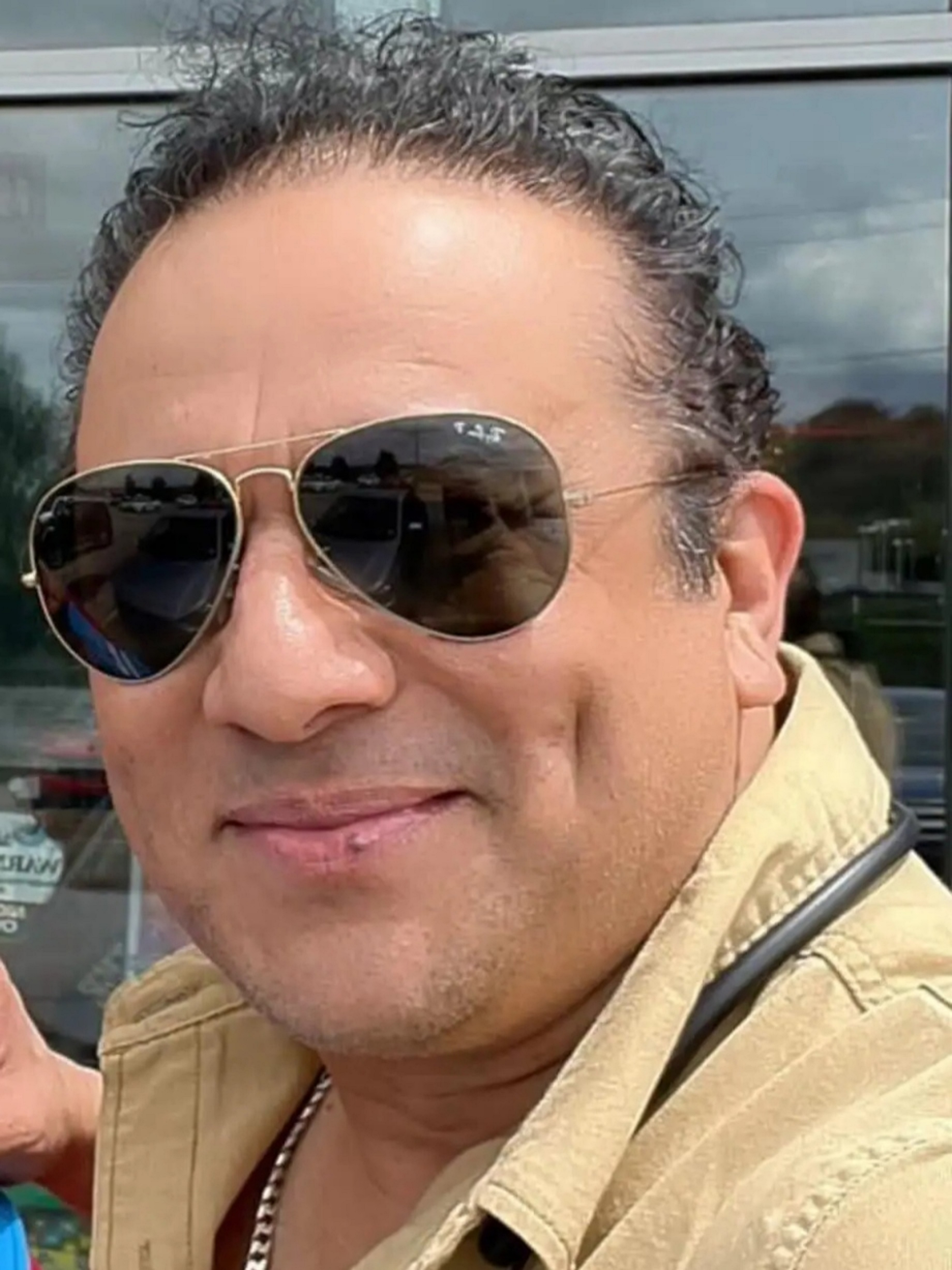
- Surya Bohara
- Born: October 15, 1971 (age 54); Dailekh, Nepal
- Occupation(s): Director, writer, actor
- Years active: 1990–present
- Known for: Agni Parikshya, Kanchha, Thooli, Bhaire, Hello Jindagi, Shree
- Spouse: Dhana Laxmi Bohara

Everest Surya Bohara (Nepali: एभरेष्ट सूर्य बोहरा) is a director, actor and lyricist. He was born at Dailekh, Nepal on 15 October 1971. His acting career started at age 17. While working in theaters in Kathmandu, he received a one-year scholarship from Nepal Government at Royal Nepal Academy to learn acting and theater. After that, he started directing and writing. He became one of Nepal's busiest stage actors, writers and directors. Bohara won many awards, rewards, and encouraging words from nationally recognized poets, writers, scholars, high ranking peoples and institutions.

== Filmography ==
Year	Film	Starring cast	Bohara's role	Ref
1998	Agni Parikshya	Rajesh Hamal, Bina Budhathoki, Narayan Tripati	Director	
2004	Kanchha	Rajesh Hamal, Karishma Manandhar, Sunil Thapa, jal shah	Director	
2012	Mutu	Keki Adhikari, Bimlesh Adhikari, Mukesh Acharya	Director	
2016	Thooli	Garima Panta, jiwan Luitel	Director	
2018	Bhaire	Dayahang Rai, Barsha Siwakoti, Bikram Basnet, Surakshya Panta, Sunil Thapa	Director	
2022	Hello Jindagi	Bikram Joshi, Kumud Pant, Deepika Prasain,Priyanka Karki	Director	
2020	Shree	Sandip Chhetri, Barsha Siwakoti, Buddhi Tamang	Director	
2023	Chameliko Poi	Surakshya Panta, Wilson Bikram Rai, Narayan Tripati, Yogendra Karki	Director	

== Awards and nominations ==
List of awards and nominations
Year	Ceremony	Category	Nominated work	Ref
2023	D Cine Award	Best Director	Shree	

== See also ==
- Cinema of Nepal
