= Gaatho =

Nepalese psychological thriller art film

- Movie Poster
- Directed by: Suraj Bhusal
- Written by: Suraj Bhusal
- Screenplay by: Suraj Bhusal; Pratik Gurung
- Produced by: Tilak Bahadur Chhetri; Suraj Bhusal
- Starring: Najir Hussain; Namrata Shrestha
- Cinematography: Narendra Mainali
- Music by: Anupam Sharma
- Production company: Butwall Entertainment
- Release date: 16 September 2016
- Country: Nepal
- Language: Nepali

Gaatho (Nepali: गाँठो) is a 2016 Nepalese psychological thriller art film directed by Suraj Bhusal and produced by Tilak Bahadur Chhetri. The film stars Najir Hussain, Abhaya Baral and Namrata Shrestha.

== Plot ==
Gaatho is about an artist with bipolar disorder and social phobia

== Cast ==
- Najir Hussain
- Namrata Shrestha
- Abhay Baral

== Crew ==
- Story/Director: Suraj Bhusal
- Producer: Tilak Bahadur Chettri, Suraj Bhusal
- Co-Producer: Nripendra Raj Joshi
- Director of Photography: Narendra Mainali
- Editor: Nimesh Shrestha
- Screenplay & Dialogue: Suraj Bhusal, Pratik Gurung
- Make-up: Nima Lama
- Music / Lyrics/Singer : Anupam Sharma
- Background Score: Jason Kunwar

== Tracks ==
No.	Title	Lyrics	Music	Singer(s)	Length
1.	"I love you"	Anupam Sharma	Anupam Sharma, Prashant Sharma Dhakal	Anupam Sharma, Prashant Sharma Dhakal, Ranjit Basnet	3:28
2.	"Saathi"	Anupam Sharma	Anupam Sharma	Anupam Sharma	3:56
Total length:					7:24
