= Captain (2019 film) =

Nepalese sports drama film directed by Diwakar Bhattarai

- Film poster
- Directed by: Diwakar Bhattarai
- Produced by: Bhuwan K.C. Executive producer Jiya K.C.
- Starring: Anmol K.C. Sunil Thapa; Upasana Singh Thakuri; Priyanka Mv; Wilson Bikram Rai; Saroj Khanal; Prashant Tamrakar
- Cinematography: Navraj Upreti
- Edited by: Dirgha Raj Khadka
- Music by: Songs: Arjun Pokharel; Background Scores: Rohit Shakya; Shailesh Shrestha
- Production company: Super Kajal Films
- Release date: 1 March 2019 (Nepal)
- Country: Nepal
- Language: Nepali
- Budget: रु 25 Million
- Box office: रु 44.54 Million

Captain (Nepali: क्याप्टेन; also known by its tagline Captain: Match Beginning Soon) is a 2019 Nepalese sports drama film directed by Diwakar Bhattarai, written by Samipya Raj Timalsena, Diwakar Bhattarai, Sagar Kharel, Brajesh Khanal and produced by Bhuwan K.C. and Jiya K.C. under the banner of Super Kajal Films. It stars Anmol K.C., with Sunil Thapa, Saroj Khanal, Wilson Bikram Rai, Upasana Singh Thakuri, Priyanka Mv, and Prashant Tamrakar. The film, which follows a teenager who struggles to follow his father's footsteps in football, was filmed across Jhapa and Ilam. It was released in Nepal on 1 March 2019. It received largely unfavourable reviews from critics for its storyline, visual special effects, and lead performances, and a mixed response from audiences. It grossed below average at the box office and ended its run after its second weekend.

== Plot ==
Madan Khadka (Saroj Khanal) was a talented footballer, but football cannot support his family, so he goes to Saudi Arabia to find work. His son, Ishan (Anmol K.C.), is following in his footsteps and wants to become a professional footballer. When his father is hurt in an accident abroad, Ishan faces many problems. His father is sick and admitted in hospital but he dreams of his father and his love for football. In the last moment he gets injured but he continues to play, and he wins the football game and the movie is finished with a happy ending.

== Cast ==
- Anmol K.C. as Ishan Khadka
- Upasana Singh Thakuri as Shreya
- Priyanka Mv as Charu
- Sunil Thapa as the coach
- Prashant Tamrakar as Imam Bikram Thapa
- Saroj Khanal as Madan Khadka (Ishan's father)
- Bhuwan K.C. (cameo appearance in "Curly Curly Kapal")
- Niruta Singh (cameo appearance in "Curly Curly Kapal")

== Soundtrack ==
No.	Title	Lyrics	Music	Singer(s)	Length
1.	"Rahar Chha Sangai"	Diggaj Dhaurali	Arjun Pokharel	Anju Panta, Sugam Pokharel	4:45
2.	"Curly Curly Kapal"	Harka Saud, Manish Dhakal	SD Yogi, Sushant Gautam	Melina Rai, SD Yogi	3:54
3.	"Sakdinaki Bachna"	Diggaj Dhaurali	Arjun Pokharel	Suman K.C., Deepa Lama	3:15

== Marketing ==
The film's poster was released in August 2018, featuring lead actor Anmol K.C. and the tagline Match Beginning Soon. A trailer was released in February 2019.

== Reception ==
=== Box office ===
Captain grossed रू2.85 crore (रू28.5 million) at the box office in four days. By its second weekend, however, the film grossed रू4.50 crore (रू45 million) and ended its run.

=== Critical response ===
Captain received poor reviews from critics. Abhimanyu Dixit of The Kathmandu Post called the film "an unintentional parody" and gave it one out of five stars, saying: "This is an honest cry, Bhuwan dai. Your audience is more mature than you think. Please surprise us by giving us something sensible the next time around". Diwakar Pyakurel of Onlinekhabar wrote: "This Anmol KC starrer is a story of makers' misses", and rated the film two out of five, saying: "Captain fails to establish itself as an example for other sports genre movies to take a leaf from in the future. Instead, like ordinary players, it makes some unsuccessful efforts to shine". The film did receive a positive review from Nepalese Prime Minister Khadga Prasad Oli, who said: "[The] movie is brilliant and it delivers patriotism, [a] social message with entertainment ... We need such content, which can boost the Nepali movie industry".
