= Maatrubhumi: May War Rest in Peace =

Upcoming Indian film by Apoorva Lakhia

- Theatrical release poster
- Directed by: Apoorva Lakhia
- Screenplay by: Chintan Gandhi
- Dialogues by: Chintan Shah
- Story by: Shiv Aroor; Suresh Nair
- Based on: India's Most Fearless by Shiv Aroor
- Produced by: Salman Khan
- Starring: Salman Khan; Chitrangada Singh; Anoop Bikram Shahi; Prashant Tamang
- Cinematography: Fasahat Khan
- Edited by: Mayuresh Sawant
- Music by: Songs: Himesh Reshammiya; Meet Bros; Sajid Khan; Shamir Tandon; Ayaan Lall; Score: Ravi Basrur
- Production company: Salman Khan Films
- Distributed by: Jio Studios (India); Zee Studios (Overseas)
- Release date: 4 December 2026
- Running time: 154 minutes
- Country: India
- Language: Hindi

Maatrubhumi: May War Rest in Peace is an upcoming Indian Hindi-language war film directed by Apoorva Lakhia and produced by Salman Khan under Salman Khan Films banner. The film stars Salman Khan in the lead role, alongside Chitrangada Singh, Anoop Bikram Shahi and Prashant Tamang.

It is loosely based on a chapter from Shiv Aroor's non-fiction book India's Most Fearless (2022) describing the 2020 China–India skirmishes, in which 50–60 soldiers of the Indian Army's 16 Bihar Regiment, led by Colonel B. Santosh Babu, engaged in combat with soldiers of China's People's Liberation Army at the Line of Actual Control (LAC).

== Cast ==
- Salman Khan as Colonel B. Santosh Babu "Sandy", 16 Bihar Regiment
- Chitrangada Singh as B. Santosh Babu's wife
- Anoop Bikram Shahi as Chinese People's Liberation Army Major
- Prashant Tamang as Senior Chinese Military Official
- Mukesh Rishi
- Ankur Bhatia
- Yashpal Sharma
- Daya Shankar Pandey
- Abhilash Chaudhary
- Abhishree Sen
- Zeyn Shaw
- Javed Khan
- Vipin Bhardwaj

== Production ==
=== Development ===
In April 2025, it was reported that Salman Khan and Apoorva Lakhia would collaborate for a war film. The film was conceived in July 2025, it was based on the aftermath of the 2020–2021 China–India skirmishes, particularly the Galwan Valley clash. It was developed as a dramatized retelling inspired by real-life events involving Indian and Chinese troops along the Line of Actual Control. The project was initially titled as Battle of Galwan. However, the title was later changed to Maatrubhumi: May War Rest in Peace. The film’s title change reflected a broader thematic focus beyond the central conflict. Several reports indicated that the change may have been influenced by the sensitive geopolitical context, leading to a more neutral and emotionally oriented narrative approach.

=== Casting ===
Salman Khan was cast in the lead role, with his character inspired by Colonel B. Santosh Babu, who was killed in action during the Galwan Valley clash. Khan reportedly went on physical transformation for his role in extreme combat conditions. In May 2025, Saqib Saleem joined the cast for a supporting role. In July 2025, Chitrangada Singh was subsequently cast as female lead alongside Khan. Ankur Bhatia also joined the cast in the same month.

=== Filming ===
Principal photography took place across both on-location and studio settings. In September 2025, portions of the film were shot in high-altitude regions of Ladakh to recreate the terrain and climatic conditions of the Galwan Valley clash, while controlled sequences were filmed on constructed sets in Mumbai. Following the completion of principal photography, the filmmakers reportedly reshoot 40% of the film and revised certain sequences, citing dissatisfaction alongside avoiding controversies.

== Music ==
Maatrubhumi: May War Rest in Peace

Soundtrack album by Himesh Reshammiya, Ayaan Lall, Shamir Tandon, Kumar Gaurav Singh and Sajid Khan
- Released: 2026
- Recorded: 2025-2026
- Genre: Feature film soundtrack
- Language: Hindi
- Label: Salman Khan Films Music
- Producers: Meghdeep Bose; Vaibhav Pani; Kandarpatta Kalita; Bitupon Boruah; Ravi Basrur

Singles from Maatrubhumi: May War Rest in Peace
- 1. "Maatrubhumi" Released: 24 January 2026; 2. "Main Hoon" Released: 14 February 2026; 3. "Chand Dekh Lena" Released: 18 March 2026; 4. "Mera Jee Nahi Bhara" Released: 10 April 2026; 5. "Main Hoon (Reprise)" Released: 28 May 2026; 6. "Jai Hind" Released: 19 October 2026; 7. "Teri Sexy Beauty" Released: 4 November 2026; 8. "Madirapan" Released: 19 November 2026

The film's soundtracks were composed by Himesh Reshammiya, Ayaan Lall, Shamir Tandon, Kumar Gaurav Singh and Sajid Khan with lyrics written by Sameer, Shabbir Ahmed, Shamir Tandon, Vishwadeep Zeest and Sajid Khan.While background score composed by Ravi Basrur.

The first song, “Maatrubhumi”, was released on 24 January 2026, two days before Republic Day. The second song, “Main Hoon”, composed by Ayaan Lall, was released on Valentine’s Day, a day after the birth anniversary of B. Santosh Babu. The third song, a romantic ballad titled “Chand Dekh Lena”, was released on 18 March 2026, on the occasion of Eid. The fourth romantic ballad, featuring Zeyn Shaw and Abhishrri Sen and composed by Shamir Tandon and Kumar Gaurav Singh, was released on 10 April 2026. On the occasion of Dussehra, another patriotic song, "Jai Hind", composed by Reshammiya and penned by Sameer, and sung by Stebin Ben was released. On 4 November, 2026, another song, titled "Teri Sexy Beauty", composed and written by Sajid Khan and with vocals by Salman Khan himself, was released. On 19 November 2026, the eighth song, "Madirapan", showing the lead character having an impromptu celebration with a bonfire and alcohols with his fellow soldiers, was released. The song was composed by Reshammiya and sung by Javed Ali, Mohd. Danish and Soumee Sailesh, while the lyrics were penned by Sameer.

Track listing
No.	Title	Lyrics	Music	Singer(s)	Length
1.	"Maatrubhumi"	Sameer Anjaan	Himesh Reshammiya	Arijit Singh, Shreya Ghoshal	6:15
2.	"Main Hoon"	Shabbir Ahmed	Ayaan Lall	Ayaan Lall, Shreya Ghoshal	4:31
3.	"Chand Dekh Lena"	Sameer Anjaan	Himesh Reshammiya	Nihal Tauro, Ankona Mukherjee	4:39
4.	"Mera Jee Nahi Bhara"	Shamir Tandon, Vishwadeep Zeest	Shamir Tandon, Kumar Gaurav Singh	Vishal Mishra, Shreya Ghoshal	3:28
5.	"Main Hoon (Reprise)"	Ayaan Lall, Shabbir Ahmed	Ayaan Lall	Shreyal Ghoshal, Ayaan Lall	3:38
6.	"Jai Hind"	Sameer Anjaan	Himesh Reshammiya	Stebin Ben	6:28
7.	"Teri Sexy Beauty"	Sajid Khan	Sajid Khan	Salman Khan, Muskaan	3:07
8.	"Madirapan"	Sameer Anjaan	Himesh Reshammiya	Javed Ali, Mohd. Danish, Soumee Sailesh	5:27

=== Reception ===
The songs, including the title track "Maatrubhumi" and the romantic number "Main Hoon", received attention upon release. They were noted for their thematic emphasis on patriotism, sacrifice, and the emotional experiences of soldiers and their families.

== Marketing ==
The teaser was released on 27 December 2025, coinciding with Khan's 60th birthday. The official trailer was revealed on 10 November 2026.

== Release ==
=== Theatrical ===
The film is scheduled to be released theatrically on 4 December 2026. The release date was announced by Khan during the film's trailer launch event on 6 November 2026 in Mumbai. Initially it was scheduled for release on 17 April 2026. However, the release was subsequently postponed after the makers undertook an extended reshoot to revise certain portions of the film and enhance its narrative impact. The film's title change was also linked to sensitivities surrounding the depiction of an ongoing geopolitical issue, with reports indicating that the filmmakers sought to avoid unnecessary controversy while retaining the film’s core message. Due to reshoots, the release date was subsequently deferred. Later, reports suggested that the film may release during the Independence Day window or Dussehra.

Khan hosted a private screening of an early cut of the film for industry professionals, including Subhash Ghai, Sooraj Barjatya, David Dhawan, Kabir Khan, Riteish Deshmukh, and Siddharth Roy Kapur, etc. In the first week of October 2026, it was reported that the film got clearance from the Ministry of Information and Broadcasting after they were satisfied with the storyline that was changed and was reshoot after the Ministry of Defence objected to its early anti-China stance.

=== Distribution ===
Jio Studios acquired the theatrical distribution rights for India, while Zee Studios acquired the overseas theatrical distribution rights.

== Reception ==
=== Critical reception ===
The film was privately screened for some prominent filmmakers, including Subhash Ghai, who expressed his admiration for the film and called it a "must-watch film."
