= Prem Geet 2 =

- Nepali: प्रेम गीत २
- English: Love Song 2
- Directed by: Ram Sharan Pathak
- Screenplay by: Ram Sharan Pathak
- Produced by: Om Gurung; Santosh Sen
- Starring: Pradeep Khadka; Aaslesha Thakuri
- Edited by: Bhupendra Adhikari; Banish Shah
- Production company: Aasusen Films Production
- Distributed by: HighlightsNepal, Kindle Cine Studio and Tauwa Creation
- Release date: July 28, 2017 (Nepal)
- Running time: 138m
- Country: Nepal
- Language: Nepali
- Budget: ₹15,000,000 (estimated)
- Box office: est.रू8.5 crore (US$550,000)+

Prem Geet 2 (English: Love Song 2) is a 2017 Nepali romantic comedy-drama film and musical. It is the sequel to Prem Geet (2016). Prem Geet 2 was released by Aasusen Films Production with HighlightsNepal, Kindle Cine Studio, and Tauwa Creation.

Prem Geet 2 premiered in major cities including Kathmandu, Butwal, and Pokhara in early July 2017, and was released across Nepal on 28 July 2017. The film received mostly positive reviews, with reviewers praising the performance of lead actor Pradeep Khadka as well as the film's cinematography, background score, and an original soundtrack. However, the film also attracted criticism for its screenplay. The film was the third-highest-grossing Nepali film of 2017 and one of Nepal's highest-grossing films, with a total box office collection of over रु8.5 cr ($1.16M as of 2020).

== Plot ==
Geet was born in Myanmar and raised in Thailand. She had returned to her grandmother's hometown in Nepal. Now that she and Prem are dating, they must travel from Myanmar back to Martha, a rural village in Mugu, Nepal. Prem must meet Geet's family and convince them that he is the right one for her.

== Cast ==
- Pradeep Khadka as Prem
- Aaslesha Thakuri as Geet
- Santosh Sen as Angad
- Kabita Regmi as Prem's mother
- Rajaram Paudel as Prem's father
- Kailash Katuwal as Geet's brother
- Sishir Bhandari as Pankaj
- Shraddha Prasai as Geet's cousin
- Kumar Karki as Geet's uncle

== Production ==
=== Pre-production ===
After the success of Prem Geet, the director and producer announced that they were producing a sequel. Director Ram Sharan Pathak said "The film is a love story. We have this challenge to make the film better than its predecessor, and we will be working for that." Pradeep Khadka and Aaslesha Thakuri announced that they were starring in the lead roles. The film was expected to be in theatres around September 2017.

=== Casting ===
Pradeep Khadka and Aaslesha Thakuri took the lead roles. Originally, Puja Sharma was chosen for the role of Geet, but she declined. There were doubts that the film would be successful at the box office, but the director continued to work and told audiences, "I've done my best in the film, so if it fails at the box office, I wouldn't mind."

=== Filming ===
The filming of Prem Geet 2 began on 12 December; it was shot in Nepal, Thailand, and Myanmar.

== Soundtrack ==
No.	Title	Lyrics	Music	Singer(s)	Length
1.	"Kahani Yo Prem Geetko"	Amrit Marahattha	Kalyan Singh	Rohit John Chettri, Shreya Sotang	5:47
2.	"Motorcycle Ma"	Rajesh Kumar Shrestha, Babin	Alish Karki	Indira Joshi, Pratap Das	6:10
3.	"Bistarai Bistarai"	Rohit John Chettri	Rohit John Chettri	Rohit John Chettri	4:59
4.	"Na Ta Hasna Nai"	Manisha Khadka	Alish Karki	Sagar Sansar Rai	4:42

=== Cover song competition ===
The director of the film announced a competition for the best cover song of "Kahani Yo Prem Geetko". The award was given on the special occasion of the 51st day of the release. Ten people were nominated for the award; it was eventually given to Neeta Thapa Magar and Badal Thapa, who received a prize of one lakh each.

== Release ==
Prem Geet 2 was released in Nepal on 28 July 2017, and worldwide on 1 August 2017. After the release of the film in Nepal, the cinema was playing to full theaters in 80 different Nepalese cinemas. To surprise the audience, the cast of the films watched the film with the audience on the release date. The trailer for the film was released on 18 June 2017.

== Critical reception ==
Prem Geet 2 received mixed reviews. My Republica wrote, "Hope for true love, hope for better films", and told the audience that the film is worth watching and that it was a landmark for the Nepalese movie industry. However, it also criticized Aaslesha Thakuri's acting, saying that her dialogue looked fake and sloppy and that she needed to work on her acting skills.

== Controversies ==
Nepalese actress Barsha Raut leaked some images of Prem Geet 2, which saddened the director. The producer of the film told Ekantipur, "The images are crucial ones. They are from the film's most seminal moments, and they hold all the suspense. We are sad about the incident." The image that leaked showed Prem's fight scene, which was one of the most important scenes of the film.

While promoting the film, Aaslesha Thakuri had an allegedly staged wardrobe malfunction while dancing. When interviewed about it, she cried.

After the trailer's release on YouTube, it received more dislikes than likes. However, it was also the #1 trending video in Nepal. This led to speculations that the dislikes were paid for.
