= Prem Pinda =

- Directed by: Yadav Kharel
- Written by: Balkrishna Sama
- Produced by: Neer Shah
- Starring: Saroj Khanal; Neer Shah; Soni Rauniyar; Melina Manandhar; Sushila Rayamajhi; Laxmi Giri; Kiran K.C.
- Music by: Sambhujeet Baskota
- Release date: 1995
- Country: Nepal
- Language: Nepali

Prem Pinda (Nepali: प्रेम पिण्ड) is a 1995 Nepali epic romantic drama film directed by Yadav Kharel and produced by actor Neer Shah. The movie stara Saroj Khanal, Soni Rauniyar, Melina Manandhar, Neer Shah in lead roles with supporting cast of Kiran K.C, Sushila Rayamajhi, Laxmi Giri, Rajaram Poudel and many more. It is an adaptation of hugely popular play by one of the greatest writer ever in Nepalese literature Balkrishna Sama of same name. Released in 1995, the movie was a commercial success and received praise from audience especially for performance of actor and its music. The film was considered a breakthrough film in Nepali cinema history mainly in historical films genre. The movie is remembered for its evergreen music by Sambhujeet Baskota with songs like "Gairi Khet ko Shirai" sung by Asha Bhosle and "K Bhanu" sung by Abhijeet being popular till today. The movie is now considered a cult classic of Nepali cinema.

== Storyline ==
The movie starts with the narrated video of the General's palace, giving a short review of the practice during the regime. In the next scene, a brother comes to the general’s palace with his sister to leave her there as a maid and receives Rs.60 for that. The sister (Soni Rauniyar) is a typical village girl who is anxious and big mouthed. She is then looked after by Kesari, who teaches her the basics of new palace life style. She is later named Sabita by General. She learns fast and is impressed with the lifestyles of the palace; does her best in getting reward from General every time. As General’s favorite, she is given special training for dance. On the other hand, she develops feelings for a servant boy working there named Nakul, and this love at first sight is a two way thing. However, their love is unknown to the world and they keep meeting in private. As General sets his lustrous eyes on Sabita's tempting youth, sensing the romance blooming between Nakul and Sabita, he tries everything to separate them forever. General, being the cruel guy has a history of killing one of his previous man servant for developing an affair with one of his personal care taker and also he would get Nakul beaten to death in front of everyone if known about the secret affair. In the middle of thorns and adverse hatred, blooms their love. After finding out about the alliance, General sends Nakul away and keeps Sabita inside the Palace under house arrest. Despite his attempts, General is not able to win Sabita’a heart and sends her away. Meanwhile, Nakul is in his death bed and remembers no one but Sabita. At the end of the story, Sabita meets Nakul minutes before his death where they share their last few words of love. Upon Nakul’s death, Sabita cries a lot. The movie ends with Sabita committing suicide by jumping off a cliff with Nakul’s corpse.

== Cast ==
- Neer Shah
- Saroj Khanal
- Sunny Rauniyar
- Melina Manandhar
- Gopal Adhikari

== Soundtrack ==
Song title	Runtime
Gairi Khet Ko	4:39
K bhanu ma kasori	4:13
Ridi kali	2:55
Chait mass	3:53
Sapana Hoyo	4:11
Timrai bainile	3:39
Mirmiri Jhyalaima	2:13

Prem Pinda is also known for having some ever green sound tracks. "Gairi Khet ko" by (Asha Bhosle) is the most famous Nepali Song. After more than a decade of its release, the song is still preferred and performed on various platforms. Lately, the song has been remade into a rock version by musician Samrit Lwagun entitled Gairi Rocks.

== Controversy ==
Prem Pinda, based in the novel by Bal Krishna Sama, subsequently differs from the original book. It has been quoted to be based in the real life events of General Adwin during (Rana regime) in Nepal.

== Accolade ==
Marking Nepalese film industry, the movie has been recommended as a must watch and is listed in the top 10 nepali movie of all time. Often mentioned in media, the movie has been noted by media persons as a literary movie holding the essence of Nepali culture.

== See also ==
- List of Nepalese films
