= Najir Husen =

Nepalese movie and threator actor

- नाजिर हुसेन
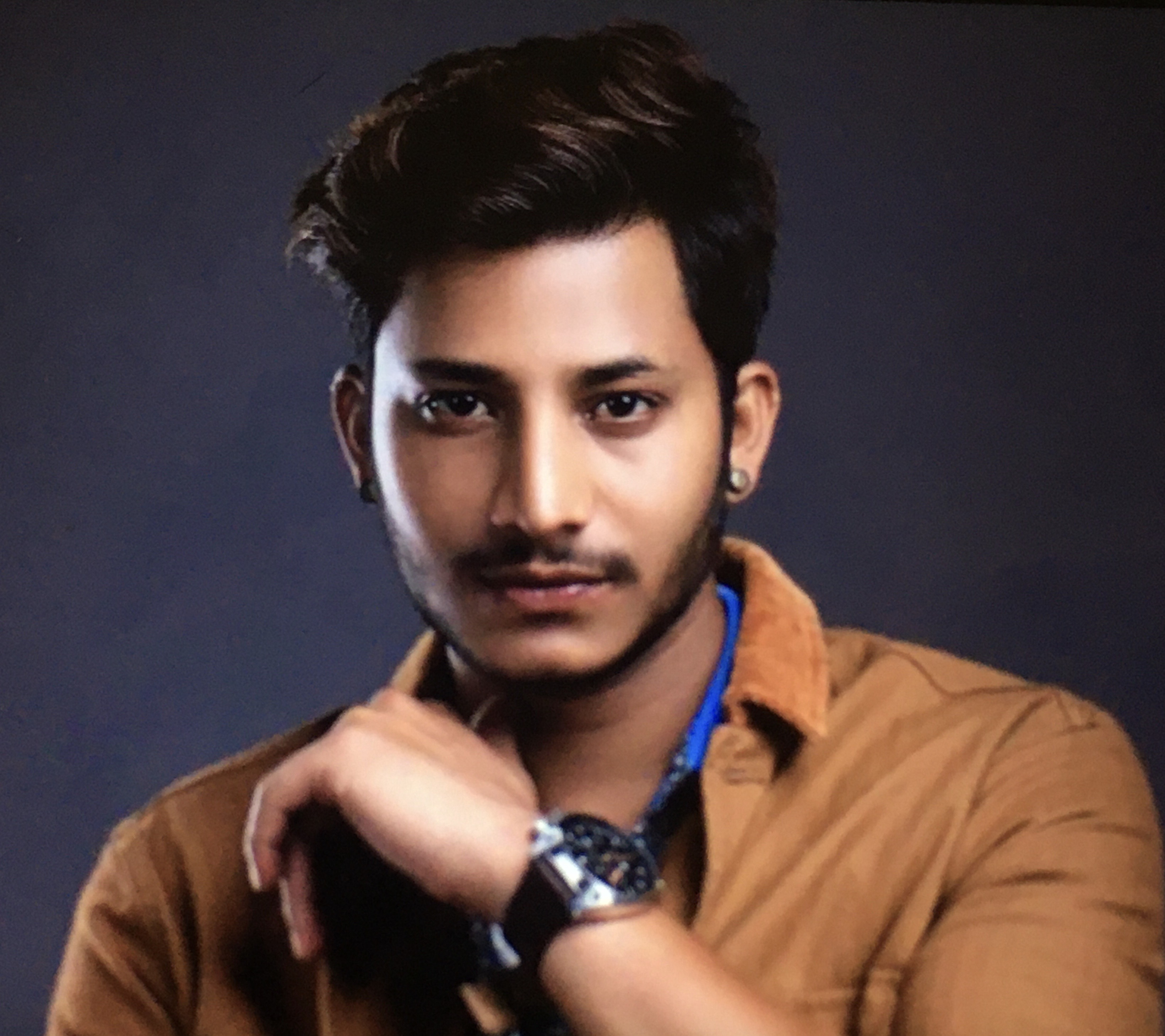
- Najir Husen in 2023
- Born: Mohamad Najir Husen; 7 September 1990 (age 35); Dumbarwana, Bara, Nepal
- Citizenship: Nepal
- Occupations: Actor, model
- Years active: 2014–present
- Notable work: Hostel Returns

Mohamad Najir Husen (Nepali: मोहम्मद नाजिर हुसेन), popularly known as Najir Husen, is a Nepalese film actor, known for his work in the Nepalese entertainment industry. One of the most critically acclaimed actors in Nepal, Husen began his career in acting at the Mandala Theater, Nepal. He received fame for his role in Hostel Returns as Rameshwor Yadav and Bikram in Bir Bikram 2. Husen has also starred in many music videos as well.

== Career ==
He was born on 7 September 1993 in Dumbarwana, Bara District, Nepal to a Madhesi family with a Nepali Muslim faith.

=== Theater and the beginning ===
Husen initially came to Kathmandu to pursue his studies and improve his dancing skills. He joined a contemporary ballet class in Kathmandu. His teacher found him expressive and suggested him to join an acting class. Najir then joined as a trainee in Mandala Theater Nepal in Kathmandu. His first theatre drama was Charandas Chor, where he had a small role; he received a lead role in the drama "Buddha Baani".

Husen got his film break as "Helmet Guy" in Priyanka Karki and Samyam Puri starred Punte Parade. The film was not commercially successful and thus Najir did not get much recognition.

=== Hostel returns and success ===
Husen played the role of Rameshwor Yadav in Hostel Returns. His role and acting was publicly acclaimed, and he became popular overnight. He then acted in successful movies like Junge, Bir Bikram and its sequel Bir Bikram 2 and critically acclaimed drama Gaatho.

== Filmography ==
Key
†	Denotes films that have not yet been released
‡	Indicates documentary release

Year	Film	Role	Note
2014	Punte Parade		Short role
2015	Hostel Returns	Rameshwor	Debut film, commercially successful
2016	Junge	Bhappu	
2016	Bir Bikram	Man Bahadur Bishwokarma or Maney	Commercially successful
2016	Gaatho		Critically acclaimed
2017	Timi Sanga	Bharat Raj Mishra	opposite Samragyee RL Shah
2018	Rajja Rani	Rajja Yadav	Love of Rajja Yadav and Rani with social and cultural obstacles of Terai Region of Nepal
2019	Garud Puran		
2019	Kagazpatra		opposite Shilpa Maskey
2019	Bir Bikram 2	Bikram	opposite Paul Shah and Barsha Siwakoti
2023	Gunyo Cholo: Coming of Age of a Girl	Gulabi	Upcoming movie
2024	Agastya: Chapter 1		
2024	Devi		
2025	Gunyo Cholo: The Dress	gulabi	lead actor as an transgender women

== Awards and nominations ==
Year	Award	Category	Nominated work	Result
2016	9th NEFTA Film Awards	Best Actor	Hostel Returns	Nominated
2017	INAS Award	Best supporting actor	Hostel Returns	Won
2018	LG Cine Award	Best Actor	Timi Sanga	Won
2026	9th Nepal International Film Festival (NIFF)	Best Actor (National)	Gunyo Cholo: The Dress	Won
