= Gaja Baja =

2018 Nepali comedy film

- Theatrical release poster
- Directed by: Ganesh Dev Panday
- Written by: Ganesh Dev Panday
- Produced by: Goma Bista; Dipendra Regmi
- Starring: Sushil Sitaula; Anupam Sharma; Rabin Thapa; Barsha Siwakoti; Uddav Bhattari; Raksha Shrestha; Ambar Subedi
- Production company: Tuka Entertainment
- Release date: 9 March 2018 (Nepal)
- Country: Nepal
- Language: Nepali

Gaja Baja is a 2018 Nepali independent comedy film, written and directed by Ganesh Dev Panday. The film was produced by Goma Bista and Dipendra Regmi under the banner of Tuka Entertainment. It stars Sushil Sitaula, and Anupam Sharma in the lead roles alongside Rabin Thapa, Barsha Siwakoti, Uddav Bhattari, Raksha Shrestha, and Ambar Subedi. Gaja Baja is about two stoners who face many challenges while seeking marijuana in Kathmandu. The film's release was delayed due to the controversial use of the word gaja, which is associated with marijuana. Gaja Baja received a generally positive critical reception.

== Plot ==
Best friends Dadhe (Anupam Sharma) and Gorey (Sushil Sitaula) love to smoke marijuana. They face many challenges while seeking marijuana in Kathmandu. They borrow money from gangster Dhude (Rabin Thapa). Unable to pay him back, they are pursued by Dhude, who is himself sought by mysterious men.

== Cast ==
- Sushil Sitaula as Gore
- Anupam Sharma as Dadhe
- Rabin Thapa as Dhude
- Barsha Siwakoti as Gore's girlfriend
- Uddav Bhattari
- Raksha Shrestha as Putali
- Ambar Subedi

== Production ==
Filming took place in Kathmandu, with shooting completed by May 2016.

== Censorship controversy ==
The Film Development Board (FDB) of Nepal refused to register the name Gajabaja or to issue a production license for the film. FDB President Raj Kumar Rai stated, "We can't give consent for [a] movie related to drug abuse". A particular concern was that the word gaja—a term for 'marijuana'—could promote use of the drug. Director Ganesh Dev Panday filed a writ in the Supreme Court of Nepal in May 2016, citing freedom of expression.

Nepali filmmakers Nischal Basnet, Khagendra Lamichhane, Sunil Pokhrel, Sunil Thapa, and Deepak Raj Giri protested the board's decision. Panday felt that the title spoke to "the soul of the movie", with gaja for 'marijuana' and baja for the film's music, and did not wish to alter it. The FDB was criticized for not clearly defining content guidelines for films, making its censorship decisions appear arbitrary, and for not developing a rating system for mature content.

Panday and production house Tuka Entertainment won the two-year legal battle. In March 2018, the FDB approved the film's release under an adult certificate, with all of the "vernacular dialogues" to be muted. Moviemandu reported that the film trailer had been bleep censored.

== Release and reception ==
The film was released domestically in theatres on 9 March 2018.

A review in Online Khabar stated: "Overall the movie is entertaining" and praised the two lead actors and the bonding between their characters. It found the dark comedy to be engaging, particularly in the first half, but felt that the ending was too sudden. Timothy Aryal of The Kathmandu Post said Gaja Baja was one of four independent Nepali films released that year which broke from foreign formulaic narratives, describing it as "a trailblazer in its own right, for it brought a new genre—the stoner comedy—to the Nepali film industry". Sunny Mahat of The Annapurna Express said that Gaja Baja is a "must-watch".

== See also ==
- Cannabis in Nepal
