= Anoop Bikram Shahi =

Nepalese actor and model

- Born: 23 July 1985 (age 41); Kathmandu, Nepal
- Occupations: Actor, model
- Years active: 2010–present
- Known for: Manhunt International 2013–2016

Anoop Bikram Shahi (Nepali: अनुप बिक्रम शाही ठकुरी; born 1985) is a prominent Nepalese actor and model. Shahi gained widespread recognition after winning the Title of Manhunt International Nepal in 2013, a feat that paved the way for him to represent Nepal at the prestigious Manhunt International competition held in Shenzhen, China, in October 2016, where he won the title of Best TV Model.

Anoop Bikram Shahi's journey from winning the Manhunt International Nepal title to becoming a celebrated actor and television personality underscores his versatility and popularity in the Nepalese entertainment industry. As a brand ambassador, his influence extends beyond the screen. With a winning combination of talent, charisma, and a strong connection with the audience, Shahi continues to be a key player in shaping the entertainment landscape in Nepal.

In addition to his success on the silver screen, Shahi has made a significant mark on the small screen. He has become a household name in Nepal as a prominent gang leader in the popular adventure reality show 'Himalaya Roadies'. Joining the show from its third season, Shahi's charismatic presence and leadership have contributed to the show's immense popularity.

Shahi's appeal extends beyond the realm of entertainment, making him a sought-after personality for brand endorsements. His association with various brands reflects the trust that companies place in his influence and popularity. As a brand ambassador, Shahi not only represents the products but also connects with the audience, making him a valuable asset for marketing campaigns.

Shahi's involvement in the entertainment industry has significantly impacted movies and television ratings in Nepal. His presence has played a pivotal role in the Movies and television success, attracting a wide audience demographic, and consistently high TRP ratings are a testament to Shahi's ability to engage viewers

Anoop Bikram Shahi, known for his versatility in the Nepalese film industry, has made his Bollywood debut in the upcoming war drama Battle of Galwan, appearing alongside Indian superstar Salman Khan.

== Filmography ==
- Dravya – 1999
- Sourya – 2013
- Hasiya – 2014
- Thamel.com – 2015
- How Funny – 2016
- Bir Bikram – 2016
- King – 2016
- Rani – 2017
- Kamaley ko Bihe – 2017
- Kri – 2018
- Hurray – 2018
- Lily Bily – 2018
- Birangana – 2018
- Jhamak Bahadur – 2018
- Jay Shambho – 2018
- Purano Bullet – 2019
- Cops – 2019
- Xira – 2019
- Password – 2019
- Commander – 2020
- Lappan Chhappan 2 – 2022
- Lakhey – 2022
- Dukhi Aatma – 2025
- Pitambar – 2025
- Jaar – 2025
- Tunnel 26 – 2026
- 12 Gaun 2 – 2026
- Maatrubhumi: May War Rest in Peace – 2026

== Awards ==
- Manhunt International Nepal title 2013-2016
- Best TV Movie Model award 2016 (Manhunt International world 2016)
- NFDC National Film Awards 2016 Best actor in negative Role
- D cine awards 2016 Best actor in negative Role
- Crity awards 2016 Best male of the year
- NEFTA Film Awards 2016 best actor in a negative Role
- Himalaya Roadies season 4 winner 2023 (Red Gang Leader )
- The Face Fashion Icon Of The Year 2023
- WOW Fashion Icon Nepal 2023
- Mountain Dew DARR KO AGADI JEET CHHA COURAGE AWARD 2023
- Himalaya Roadies season 6 winner 2025 (Red Gang Leader )
- JINSCO ARIGATO International Film Festival Japan 2025 - Breakthrough performance
- Fashiofare Award 2024 - Fashion Icon Of The Year

== Brand ambassador ==
- MOUNTAIN DEW since 2021 to present
- YAHAMA since 2026 to present
- HUMAN FIT since 2024 to present
