= Lily Bily =

- Film poster
- Directed by: Milan Chams
- Produced by: Govinda Shahi; Sudip Khadka Writer = Pradeep Bhardwaj
- Starring: Pradeep Khadka; Priyanka Karki; Jassita Gurung; Anoop Bikram Shahi
- Release date: 13 April 2018 (Nepal)
- Running time: 138 Minute
- Country: Nepal
- Language: Nepali
- Budget: 2 Crore
- Box office: 6.52 Crore

Lily Bily is a 2018 Nepalese drama romance film, directed by Millan Chams, and film penned by highly paid screenwriter Pradeep Bhardwaj. The film is produced by Govinda Shahi, and Sudip Khadka under the banner of Kafia Films. The film stars Pradeep Khadka, Priyanka Karki, Jassita Gurung, and Anoop Bikram Shahi in the lead roles.

== Plot ==
Aabvash (Pradeep Khadka) and Shrutee (Jassita Gurung) meet in Scotland. Coming from different backgrounds, they begin to discover their soulmates in each other before ultimately falling in love with themselves.

== Cast ==
- Pradeep Khadka as Aavash/Bily
- Jassita Gurung as Shrutee/ Lily
- Priyanka Karki
- Anoop Bikram Shahi

== Soundtrack ==
No.	Title	Lyrics	Music	Singer(s)	Length
1.	"Is it love"	Rajesh Kumar Shrestha	Alish Karki	Pratap Das, Melina Rai	4:04
2.	"Ghumna Jau Engine Gadima"	Ektaare	S.D. Yogi	S.D. Yogi	3:04
3.	"Hawa Sari"	Dipendra Ghimire	S.D Yogi	S.D Yogi, Menuka Poudel	3:36
4.	"Kehi Baki"	Babin Bikram Adhakari	Alish Karki	Sunny Sunam	3:07
