= Tapasya (1991 film) =

- Directed by: Narayan Puri
- Screenplay by: Sailesh Acharya
- Produced by: Roshana Films
- Starring: Saroj Khanal; Gauri Malla; Beena Basnet; Karishma Manandhar
- Cinematography: Ram Shankar Pradhan
- Edited by: Subodh Shreedhar
- Music by: Udit Narayan; Raama Mandal; Kavita Krishnamurthy; Sadhana Sargam
- Release date: 1991
- Running time: 138 minutes
- Country: Nepal
- Language: Nepali

Tapasya is a 1991 Nepalese movie produced by Roshana Films. It is directed by Narayan Puri. It stars Saroj Khanal, Gauri Malla, Beena Basnet, and Karishma Manandhar in lead roles.

== Cast ==
Name
Saroj Khanal
Gauri Malla
Kiran Pratap K.C.
Karishma Manandhar
Bina Basnet(Budhathoki)
Rajaram Poudyal
Puja Chand
Ashok Sharma
Shanti Maskey
Chiranjibi Basnet
Jayanendra Chand
Deshbhakta Khanal
Rekha Shahi
Shyam Rai (Special Appearance)
