= Bir Bikram 2 =

2019 Nepali romantic comedy film

- Theatrical release poster
- Directed by: Milan Chams
- Written by: Pradeep Bhardwaj
- Produced by: Milan Chams
- Starring: Paul Shah; Barsha Siwakoti; Najir Hussain; Buddhi Tamang; Desh Bhakta Khanal
- Production company: Chams Entertainment
- Release date: May 17, 2019 (Nepal)
- Country: Nepal
- Language: Nepali

Bir Bikram 2 is a 2019 Nepali romantic comedy film. The film was directed by Milan Chams, written by Pradeep Bhardwaj, who is the top-paid screenwriter of the Nepalese film industry, produced by Milan Chams, and executive produced by Arpan Sapkota under the banner of Chams Entertainment. The film stars Paul Shah, Barsha Siwakoti, Najir Hussain, Buddhi Tamang, and Desh Bhakta Khanal. Bir Bikram 2 is a sequel to the 2016 film Bir Bikram, and received mixed reviews from the critics but met with a positive response from the audience. The film was a success in single screens but had a poor run in multiplexes, giving it a box office verdict of Below Average.

== Plot ==
Two best friends, Bir (Paul Shah) and Bikram (Najir Hussain), fall in love with the same girl, Badal (Barsha Siwakoti). She falls in love with Bir. Then Baag Bahadur (Buddhi Tamang) also falls for Badal. He breaks the two best friends apart and kidnaps Badal. Bir and Bikram swear to get Badal back, and eventually do, but at a cost; Bikram dies as he prevents his two friends from killing each other. In the end, she forgives Baag Bahadur for kidnapping her.

== Cast ==
- Paul Shah as Bir
- Barsha Siwakoti as Badal
- Najir Hussain as Bikram
- Buddhi Tamang as Baag Bahadur
- Desh Bhakta Khanal

== Reception ==
Abhimanyu Dixit of The Kathmandu Post said the film was sexist, writing, "Even in Bir Bikram 2, both the male leads take sneaky pictures of Barsha Siwakoti's character without her knowledge. Is this acceptable behavior? In one scene, a character blatantly says, "Budi ko fariya ho ra chyatna lai?" (Am I your wife's skirt to tear?). How's that not sexist?" This review received a mixed response from the Nepali audience.

Rupak Risal of Moviemanu gave the movie 3 out of 5 stars. He praised some performances, especially that of Najir Hussain and music, while he also wrote, " The entire climax could have been shortened to sharpen the final act. Controlled performances from all; however, Buddhi Tamang is overly dramatic at the beginning. His performance is much more convincing in the second half. Overall, the movie is a good one-time watch."

Pranesh Gautam, a comedian, produced a review of the film, calling it "unnecessarily loud" and noting that "the story is strikingly similar to the Bollywood hit Sholay (1975), and the film has nothing new to offer". He also used weapons in his review video, which also received backlash from the audience. He was arrested and detained for nine days after a first information report was filed by the director, Milan Chams, who accused Gautam of "defamation, libel, expressing sexist, racial remarks through social media while reviewing the movie," and of cybercrime. Gautam was arrested under the Cyber Crime Act. This caused an outcry among Nepali youths, while some sections also criticized for use of over-the-top tone and antics and the use of some words. Gautam was released after nine days in jail.

== Soundtrack ==
Original Motion Picture Soundtrack
| No. | Title | Lyrics | Music | Singer(s) | Length |
|---|---|---|---|---|---|
| 1. | "Piratiko Mitho Tirsana" | Kusum Gajmer, Tulsi Ghimire | Ranjit Gazmer | Tara Prakash Limbu, Melina Rai | 4:34 |
| 2. | "Bachha" | Naresh Bhattarai | Tara Prakash Limbu | Tara Prakash Limbu, Deepa Lama | 4:34 |
