= Milan Chams =

Nepalese film director

Milan Chamling Rai (मिलन चाम्लिङ राई)
- मिलन चाम्लिङ राई
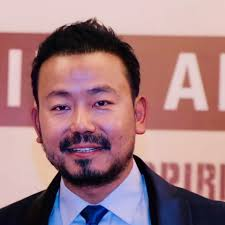
- Chams at Pressmeet in 2021
- Born: 20 March 1980 (age 46); Kathmandu, Nepal
- Citizenship: Nepali
- Occupations: Director; producer; Screenwriter
- Years active: 2014–present
- Notable work: Bir Bikram; Lily Bily

Milan Chamling Rai (born 20 March 1980), known professionally as Milan Chams, is a Nepali film director and producer. His film “Anjila” selected for the Oscar to represent from Nepal. He is active in the Nepali film industry and is known for directing several feature films, including Blind Rocks (2018), for which he received the National Film Award for Best Director.

Chams has also been recognized for his contributions to Nepali cinema by the Government of Nepal. He was awarded the Janasewa Shree Padak, a civilian honor, by then-President Bidhya Devi Bhandari for his work in filmmaking and promotion of Nepali cinema.

He has directed films that feature international shooting locations, including Norway, Turkey, the United Kingdom, Romania, and Azerbaijan, and has contributed to expanding the geographical scope of Nepali film production. His 2022 film Gurkha Warrior premiered at Leicester Square, London, marking a rare international red carpet screening for a Nepali-language film.

== Film career ==
Chams began his career in the Nepali entertainment industry as a music video director, having directed over 200 music videos. He transitioned to feature films in 2014 with his debut film Hasiya. His second film, Bir Bikram, gained popularity among Nepali audiences and played a significant role in establishing his career as a film director.

== Filmography ==
Year	Title	Credit
2025	Anjila	Director
2024	Bar and Badhu	Director
2023	Gurkha Warrior	Director, screenplay, dialogue
2019	Bir Bikram 2	Director, producer
2018	Bobby	Director, producer
2018	Happy Days	Director, producer, choreographer
2018	Lily Bily	Director, producer
2018	Blind Rocks	Director
2016	Bir Bikram	Director
2014	Hasiya	Director

== Awards and nominations ==
Year	Ceremony	Category	Project	Result
2016	8th D Cine Award	Best Director	Bir Bikram	Nominated
2016	8th D Cine Award	Best Film	Bir Bikram	Nominated
2016	Box Office National Award	Best Director	Bir Bikram	Won
2016	Box Office National Award	Best Film Bir Bikram	Won	
2017	LG Cine Circle Award	Best Director	Bir Bikram	Won
2017	LG Cine Circle Award	Best Film	Bir Bikram	Won
2018	INAS Film Award	Best Film	Bir Bikram	Won
2018	NFDC National Award	Best Director	Lily Bily	Won
2018	NFDC National Award	Best Choreographer	Blind Rocks	Nominated
2018	D Cine Award	Best Director	Lily Bily	Won
2018	D Cine Award	Best Critics Award	Blind Rocks	Won
2018	Surya International Award	Best Director	Lily Bily	Nominated
2018	Kamana Film Award	Best Director	Lily Bily	Won
2018	Kamana Film Award	Best Film	Lily Bily	Won
2018	Kamana Film Award	Best Choreographer	Blind Rocks	Nominated
2019	Global Film Award, USA	Best Film	Lily Bily	Won
2019	National Award	Best Director	Blind Rocks	Won
2019	National Award	Best Film	Blind Rocks	Won
2019	Kamana Film Award	Best Director	Bobby	Nominated
2019	Everest International Award	Best Director	Lily Bily	Nominated
2019	Everest International Award	Best Film	Lily Bily	Nominated
2019	Surya International Award	Best Director	Bobby	Nominated
2019	Chhyachabi International Award	Best Director	Year 2019	Won
2020	INEA International Award	Best Director	Year 2019	Won
2021	Box office Film Fare Award	Special Movie "Bobby"	Year 2019	Won
2021	Sparsha Music Video Award	Best Director	Year 2021	Won
2021	Nepal Music and Fashion Award	Critics Award	2021	Won
2021	President Award (Jana Swea shree)	Bhibhusan	2021	Won
2022	A&P National Award	Best Director	2021	Won
2022	Sparsha Music Video Award	Best Director	2022	Won
2022	Yuba Chalchitra Nirdesak Samman	Nirdeshak Samaj	2022	Won
2023	Captivating Creation Award, India	Best Director	2023	Won
2024	Koshi Film Festival	Best Director	Gurkha Warrior	Won
