= Love Station (2019 film) =

2019 Nepalese drama romance film directed by Ujwal Ghimire

- Directed by: Ujwal Ghimire
- Produced by: Gobinda Shahi, Krishu Shahi, Kabir Bikram Shahi
- Starring: Pradeep Khadka; Jassita Gurung
- Edited by: Arjun GC; Lokesh Bhajracharya
- Release date: 5 April 2019 (Nepal)
- Country: Nepal
- Language: Nepali
- Budget: 2 Crores
- Box office: 1.45 Crores

Love Station is a 2019 Nepalese romantic drama directed by Ujwal Ghimire. The film is produced by Gobinda Shahi, Krishu Shahi, and Kabir Bikram Shahi under the banner of Kafiya Films. It stars Pradeep Khadka and Jassita Gurung, supported by Ramesh Budhathoki, Siru Bista, Rabi Dangol and Priya Rizal The film was released on April 5, 2019.

== Plot ==
The story follows Rani (Jassita Gurung), who was kidnapped as a child by Sagar (Pradeep Khadka) under pressure from his father. Sagar's father coerced him into the act Sagar's mother died during childbirth. Twenty-two years later, Rani's father arranges her marriage to Arjun, but Rani develops feelings for Sagar, her childhood abductor. Meanwhile, Arjun is involved in an extramarital affair.

When Rani discovers Arjun's infidelity, she becomes distraught, and Sagar supports her emotionally. Arjun confronts Sagar, threatening him, which leads Sagar to move to a flat near Rani's home. Over time, Rani grows closer to Sagar.

During a party, Sagar notices a birthmark on Rani that confirms her identity as the girl he had kidnapped. A misunderstanding causes Rani to resent him, and her father insists she marry Arjun.

During the wedding, Arjun's affair is exposed, and Sagar takes Rani to the house where she was born. There, Rani unknowingly meets her biological mother. Later, she discovers a childhood photograph showing the same birthmark, revealing her true parentage and reuniting her with her family.

== Cast ==
- Pradeep Khadka
- Jassita Gurung
- Ramesh Budhathoki
- Siru Bista
- Rabi Dangol
- Priya Rizal
