= Asha Bhushal =

Nepalese actress and model

- आशा भुषाल
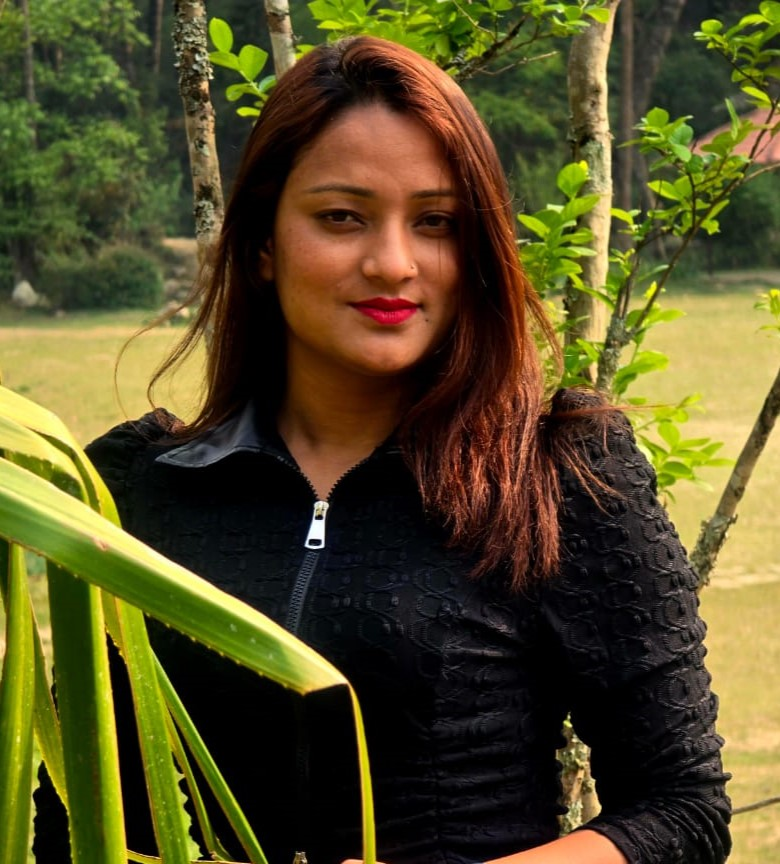
- Born: 18 February 1989 (age 37); Sindhuli, Nepal
- Citizenship: Nepal
- Occupations: Actress, model
- Years active: 2068–present

Asha Bhushal (Nepali: आशा भुषाल; born 18 February 1989) is a Nepalese actress and model who works predominantly in Nepali cinema.

== Career ==
Bhushal started her acting career with the television serial Sunaulo Bihani Her debut movie was Dushmani Nepali.

Her movie Sunpani was selected for Oscar awards. She has received National Capital Award and Himalayan International Awards.

== Filmography ==
SN	Year	Film	Role	Ref(s)
1	2015	Sunpani	Actress	
2	2024	Upahar	Actress	
3		Samarpan	Actress	
4		Dushmani	Actress	
5		Jhingedau	Actress	
6	2026	Jhingedau 2	Actress	
7	upcoming	A Mero Hajur 5		

== Awards ==
SN	Award title	Award category	Nominated work	Result	ref
1	Himalayan International Award	Jury Award	Samarpan	Won	
2	Birat Music Award	Best Actress In TV Serial	Bhadragol	Won	
3	Anp National Award - 2021	Telefilm Actress Award		Won	

== Honors ==
SN	Honor title	Date	Ref
1	Bises Nagrik Samman		
