= Nai Nabhannu La 4 =

Nepalese romance film

- Theatrical release poster
- Directed by: Bikash Raj Acharya
- Story by: Bikash Raj Acharya
- Produced by: Dinesh Pokharel; Haribol Bhandari
- Starring: Paul Shah; Priyanka Karki; Barsha Raut; Aanchal Sharma; Anubhav Regmi
- Cinematography: Purushottam Pradhan
- Edited by: Arjun G.C.
- Music by: Basanta Sapkota
- Production company: Bikas Raj Acharya Film Production
- Distributed by: Anjel Film (AUS); Himalaya Film (USA)
- Release date: 8 April 2016
- Running time: 120 minutes
- Country: Nepal
- Language: Nepali
- Budget: रु. 1.29 करोड
- Box office: Rs. 4 crore.

Nai Nabhannu La 4 (transl. Don't say no 4) is a 2016 Nepalese romance film written and directed by Bikash Raj Acharya. It is the fourth film in the Nai Nabhannu La series, following Nai Nabhannu La (2010), Nai Nabhannu La 2 (2014), and Nai Nabhannu La 3 (2015). The film marks the debut of Paul Shah, Barsha Raut, and Aanchal Sharma in the lead roles, along with Priyanka Karki, Anubhav Regmi, and Saroj Khanal in lead roles. The film was released in Nepal, Australia, and the USA on 8 April 2016. The film met with mixed responses from critics but an overwhelming response from the audience. The film was a blockbuster at the box office, and the film turned Barsha Raut and Aanchal Sharma stars while boosting the stardom of lead actor Paul Shah, who was very popular owing to his stardom from music videos. The film is also one of the highest-grossing Nepali films in Nepal.

== Plot ==
Neer (Paul Shah), a heartbroken young man running away from the police, invaded the house where Aani (Priyanka Karki) and Shishir (Anubhav Regmi) live. When Ani asks him about his past and the reason behind running away from the police, Neer tells them that he and Aanchal (Aanchal Sharma) were in a relationship and they were about to get married. On the marriage day, Aanchal was kidnapped and raped by a stranger. Aanchal was broken and committed suicide by jumping from the building. Neer killed all the strangers and ran away, thus taking revenge. Anjana (Barsha Raut), who is the niece of Aani, falls in love with Neer for his innocence. After the enormous try, Anjana helped Neer back to his real life. But the person in charge of the murder case turns out to be none other than her father (Saroj Khanal), who, when he comes to visit Aani and Anjana, finds that Neer is hiding in their house. After some dramatic events, Neer runs from the house and is chased by the police, where he is killed by Anjana's father. Anjana is shattered and deeply heartbroken. She becomes mentally ill. She then always visits Neer's coffin and dedicates her life to Neer in a tragic climax.

== Cast ==
Actor	Role
Paul Shah	Neer
Priyanka Karki	Aani
Barsha Raut	Anjana
Aanchal Sharma	Aanchal
Anubhav Regmi	Shishir
Saroj Khanal	Anjana's father
