= Jayanendra Chand Thakuri =

Nepali actor (1942–2020)

- Born: 1942; Baitadi, Nepal
- Died: 31 May 2020 (aged 77–78); Lalitpur, Nepal
- Other names: Jayananda Chand
- Occupation: Actor
- Years active: 1982–2011

Jayanendra Chand Thakuri (Nepali:जयनेन्द्र चन्द ठकुरी, 1942 – 31 May 2020) was a Nepalese actor known for his work in Nepali cinema. Thakuri acted in more than 100 films, including Kanchhi, Bishwas, Maya Preeti, Pheri Bhetaula, Angarakshyak and Parkhi Base. He died after having been paralysed for nine years and bedridden the last six months.

== Personal life ==
Thakuri was born in Baitadi in Far-Western Nepal, to father, Sheel Chanda, and mother, Rukmini Devi Chanda. He was in the Indian Army. He played cricket for Jawalakhel Youth Club. Thakuri was married to Shanti Chand Thakuri, with whom he had one daughter, Chaya Upreti.

== Career ==
Thakuri debuted as an actor in the 1982 Nepali film Jeevan Rekha. He went on to appear in more than 100 films, and multiple television serials. He starred in Kanchhi, Biswas, Maya Priti, Feri Bhetaula, Angarakshyak, and Parkhi Base. He made his Bollywood debut with Panchavati released in 1986; he also appeared in the Pakistani film Phani.

Thakuri's health started to worsen when he was filming Bhagi Bhagi Najau (2012), after an accident at the sets. The accident paralysed his left leg and after that he was undergoing treatment. Bhagi Bhagi Najau was the last film he appeared in, after acting for almost four decades.

He was awarded the Abhiyan Actor of the Decade in 1995. Artha Sansar wrote that he made a big contribution to Nepali cinema.

== Illness and death ==
Thakuri was paralysed for his last nine years. He had additional health problems including high blood pressure and diabetes. He was mostly bedridden the last six months of his life.

On 31 May 2020, Thakuri died at 11:20 a.m. (NPT) in his home in Lalitpur. His remains were cremated the same day at the Pashupati Electric Crematorium. The funeral was attended by the members of Film Artists Association of Nepal and Film Development Board.

== Selected filmography ==
Year	Film	Note(s)
1982	Jeevan Rekha	
1984	Kanchhi	
1985	Bishwas	
1989	Maya Preeti	
1989	Pheri Bhetaula	
1992	Adhikar	
1993	Tapasya	
2003	Angarakshyak	
2008	Parkhi Base	
2012	Bhagi Bhagi Najau	
