= Shishir Rana =

Nepalese film director, actor and producer

Shishir S.J.B Rana
- शिशिर राणा
- Born: Shishir S.J.B Rana; June 5, 1971 (age 54); Kathmandu, Nepal
- Occupations: Actor, producer, writer, director
- Years active: 1991–present
- Partner: Namita Rana (2001–present)
- Children: 2

Shishir S.J.B Rana is a Nepalese actor, producer, director and writer who appeared in several Nepali movies and television serials such as Madan Bahadur Hari Bahadur, Tito Satya, Jire Khursani, Meri Bassai and Jhyaikuti jhayai. He was born in Kathmandu, Nepal. He did his schooling from Birendra Sainik Awasiya Mahavidyalaya, Bhaktapur. He started his career as an Assistant Director in movie Chokho Maya in year 1991 AD. Later he worked as a production manager in many Nepali films and also worked as a model and Line producer in Nepali Advertisement industry. He won best screen play and best film award for his debut directional film 'Timi Sanga'.

| Release year | Film title | नेपाली शीर्षक | Director | Role |
|---|---|---|---|---|
| 2004 | Basanta Ritu | बसन्त ऋतु | Kishor Dhakal | Story |
| 2008 | Living Goddess | | Ishbel Whitaker | Location Manager |
| 2011 | Andaj | अन्दाज | Ujjwal Ghimire | Actor |
| 2012 | Dhuwa | धुवाँ | Laxman Rijal | Actor |
| 2012 | K Ma Timro Saathi Banna Sakchhu | के म तिम्रो साथी बन्न सक्छु | Shabir Shrestha | Actor |
| 2012 | Parichaya | परीचय | Aakash Pandey | Actor |
| 2013 | Hamesha | हमेशा | Shabir Shrestha | Actor |
| 2013 | Kollywood | कलिउड | Navaraj Acharya | Actor |
| 2013 | Superhit | सुपरहिट | Raj Shakya | Actor |
| 2014 | November Rain | नोवेम्बेर रेन | Dinesh Raut | Actor |
| 2014 | Birkhe Lai Chinchas | बिर्खेलाई चिन्छस | Araaj Keshav Giri | Actor |
| 2014 | Jholay | झोले | Dipendra Khanal | Actor(Angure) |
| 2015 | How Funny | हाउ फन्नी | Nilu Doma Sherpa | Actor |
| 2015 | Mission Paisa 2 - Reloaded | मिसन पैसा २ रिलोडेड | Simosh Sunwar | Actor |
| 2015 | Mala | माला | Bobby Bhupal Singh | Producer/Actor |
| 2015 | Zindagi Rocks | जिन्दगी रक्स | Nikesh Khadka | Actor |
| 2016 | Bir Bikram | | Milan Champs | Actor |
| 2015 | Wada No 6 | | Ujjwal Ghimire | Actor |
| 2016 | Classic | | Dinesh Raut | Actor |
| 2016 | Chakka Panja | | Deepashree Niraula | Actor |
| 2017 | Ma Yesto Geet Gauchu | | Shudarshan Thapa | Actor |
| 2017 | Chakka Panja 2 | | Deepashree Niraula | Actor |
| 2018 | Timi Sanga | | Shishir Rana | Producer/Writer/Actor |
| 2018 | Happy Days | | Milan Champs | Actor |
| 2018 | Bobby | | Milan Champs | Actor |
| 2018 | Matti Mala | | Tek Paurakhi Rai | Actor |
| 2018 | Kaira | | Laxman Rijal | Actor |
| 2018 | Renault Kwid(Indian TVC) | | Anupam Mishra | Line Producer |
| 2018 | Ram Kahani | | Shudarshan Thapa | Actor |
| 2019 | Poi Paryo Kaley | | Shishir Rana | Actor/Director/Writer |
| 2022 | Samjhana Birsana | | Nimesh Pradhan | Actor |
| 2023 | Chakka Panja 4 | | Hemraj BC | Actor |
| 2023 | Gulabi | | Samundra Bhatta | Actor |
| 2024 | Upahaar | | Gyanendra Deuja | Actor |

== Early life ==
Shishir Rana was born in Lalitpur, Nepal. He is the eldest of Mr. Hemanta S.J.B Rana and Late Mrs. Dipti Rana's two children. He has one sister. His father is in the educational field, His father was also the Principle for Birendra Sainik Awasiya Mahavidyalaya and Dipendra Police School. His mother was an housewife and she wrote the first Cook Book of Nepal. His parents went to America for their studies when he was 4 that's why he was raised in his maternal home in Kupondole.

== Personal life ==
He is married to Namita Malla Rana. He has a daughter, Namami Rana and a son, Naman S.J.B Rana. He is Great-Great grandson of Shree 3 Maharaja and former Rana Prime Minister of Nepal Bir Shumsher Jung Bahadur Rana and Great grandson of Nepal's first ever field-marshal Rudra Shumsher Jung Bahadur Rana.
