= Saroj Khanal =

Nepali actor

- Born: 14 March 1960 (age 66); Chitwan, Nepal
- Occupations: Actor, director
- Years active: 1987–present
- Notable work: Prem Pinda
- Honors: Prabal Gorkha Dakshinbahu

Saroj khanal is a Nepalese actor, director who predominantly work in Nepali cinema. He has starred in many commercially successful films Bagan (2023), Prem Pinda (1995), Bijay parajay, Captain (2019), Prem Geet (2016), Samhalinchha Kahile Mann (2022) and many TV serials.

== Career ==
In 1987, Khanal began his acting career in theater, debuting with the play "Bhasmasur ko Nali haad".

Khanal moved to United States in 1997, where he lived over 15 years. During his time there, he worked in the food and beverage industry and took part in a range of cultural events. He returned to Nepal and resumes his acting career with appearances in films like Prem Geet and Captain.

== Personal life ==
Beyond his acting career, Khanal involved in agriculture focusing on his family's poultry farm in Nawalpur. He introduced modern farming practices and biosecurity measures aimed at improving efficiency and maintaining hygiene standards.

== TV Serial ==
Year	Title	Role	Ref
1988	Maun Aakash		
	Bhid dekhi bhid samma		

== Film ==
Year	Film	Role	Ref
2023	Timro Mero Saath		
2023	Gunjan		
2023	Nai Na Bhannu La		
2022	Samhalinchha Kahile Man		
2022	Ma		
2022	Lakka Jawan		
2020	Hero Returns		
2019	Mr. Nepali		
2019	Ghar		
2019	Pasina (The Sweat)		
2019	A Mero Hajur 3		
2019	Love Station		
2019	Shuva Love		
2019	Captain		
2019	The Break Up		
2019	Boyfriend		
2019	Summer Love		
2018	Dream Girl		
2018	Anurag		
2018	Reni		
2018	Babu Kanchha		
2018	Hairan		
2018	Panchayat	Thulo Baa	
2018	Kri		
2017	Deepjyoti		
2017	Ma Yesto Geet Gauchhu		
2017	Darpan Chhaya 2		
2016	Subba Sab		
2016	Nai Nabhannu La 4		
2016	Prem Geet		
2014	Nai Nabhannu La 2		
2013	Maanav		
2002	Ghar Aangan		
1998	Daiba Sanjog		
1998	Dushman		
1997	Ragat		
1997	Nirmohi		
1996	Chunauti		
1996	Aama		
1996	Aama Ko Maya		
1996	Sannani		
1996	Gothalo		
1996	Awala		
1995	Janmabhumi		
1995	Jaya Baba Pashupatinath		
1995	Dharma		
1995	Janma Janma		
1994	Jwala		
1994	Mahamaya		
1994	Sadak		
1994	karja		
1994	Mohani		
1994	Sarangi		
1994	Paribhasha		
1994	Chahana		
1994	Pukar		
1993	Prem Pinda		
1993	Tapasya		
1993	Chokho Maya		
1992	Mukti Sangarsha		
1992	Didee		
1992	Kasam		
1992	Prem		
1992	Arunima		
1991	Manakamana		
1990	Bijaya Parajaya		
1990	Chot		
1989	Numbari Sun		

== Awards ==
Year	Award
2076 BS	Dcine Award 2076
2074 BS	Dcine Award 2074
2073 BS	Kamana Film Award 2073
1993	Prabal Gorkha Dakshinbahu
