= Manoj RC =

Nepalese film actor

- मनोज कुमार आर.सी.
- Born: 1983 May 11; Paink, Jajarkot
- Occupation: Film Actor
- Years active: 2002-present
- Spouse: Anita Shah
- Children: 1
- Parents: Hansraj Rokaya (father); Shiba RC (mother)
- Awards: Kamana Film Award (2014); D Cine Award (2017)

Manoj Kumar RC (Nepali: मनोज कुमार आर.सी.) (born on 11 May 1983), credited as Manoj RC is a Nepali film actor known for his versatile acting. He has received Kamana Film Award for Best Actor in Negative Role for his performance in Madhumas. It was a blockbuster and his role was well appreciated by the audiences. He rose to prominence from his debut historical film Bir Ganeshman portraying in the role of martyr Gangalal Shrestha in 2002. His first leading role in a film was Lakshya. He has appeared in significant music videos including Paap Punya song by Hemant Rana.

In addition to acting, he is a humanitarian and has taken part in street dramas related to sanitation and health in the earthquake affected areas after the April 2015 Nepal earthquake.

== Early life ==
Manoj was born on 11 May 1983 in Paink, Jajarkot district, a remote area in Mid-Western Nepal. He has a younger brother. His father was a Government of Nepal employee working under Ministry of Education (Nepal). Although he was born in Jajarkot, he could not stay for a long time in his birth place. He has visited most parts of Nepal according to the job transfer of his father. He completed secondary level education from Janata Higher Secondary School, Khalanga, Rukum district in 1998. He was good in study and other extra curriculum activities like martial art and drama. He went to Kathmandu for higher studies and also joined acting classes, martial art training. Then, he met and collaborated with writer Nabindra Raj Joshi and director Manoj Pandit and entered in Nepali film Industry.

== Acting career ==
Manoj debut film was Bir Ganeshman as a supporting role in 2002. The historical film was directed by Sahajman Shrestha and Bijay Ratna Tuladhar and written by Nabindra Raj Joshi which was under the banner of Ganesh Man Singh Study Foundation. His role as Martyr Gangalal Shrestha was much appreciated. His first Feature film in the leading actor was thriller young love story Lakshya (2004) which was produced by Harendra Limbu under the banner of Ingnam pictures and directed by Manoj Pandit. Later he also played as the Leading role in movie C-Mala (The Necklace) in 2013 which was shot in the beautiful location in Mustang. It was directed by Rudra Bahadur Gurung. The film was nominated in the Fukuoka Asian Film Festival (Japan) in 2015 and was officially selected by Hongkong International Film and TV Market(FILMART). His another blockbuster was romantic Thriller film Madhumas(2013). He received Kamana Film Award for Best Actor in Negative Role from the movie. He was also nominated in another three awards for the same category. He has acted in the comedy movie Humjayaga(2014). In 2016, he appeared as the leading actor in the movie Jhumkee. His awaited movie Mithya is expected to be released soon.

== Personal life ==
Manoj RC is married to Anita (2004) Shah who is working in a commercial bank. They have a daughter named Sambriddhi RC.

== Filmography ==
=== Films ===
Film
Year	Title	Role	Notes
2002	Bir Ganeshman	Gangalal	Debut
2004	Lakshya	Manoj	Lead Actor
2013	C-Mala	Manish Pandey	Lead Actor
2013	Madhumas	Raghav	Lead Actor in Negative Role
2014	Humjayaga		Supporting Role
2016	Jhumkee	Gokul Bhatta	Lead Actor
2016	Mithya(to be released)		Lead Actor

=== Music videos ===
Music Videos
Title	Singer	Album
Paap punya Kasle garyo	Hemant Rana	Paap Punya
Rupauli rani mayaki khani	Udit Narayan	
Badnamai hunchu timro namama	Hement Sharma	Aatmiya
Kinar wari bhaya ma ta	Swaroop Raj Acharya	Anubhuti
Timro maunta ma	Swaroop Raj Acharya	Gumnaam

== Awards and nominations ==
List of awards and nominations
Year	Ceremony	Category	Work	Result
2014	First Kamana Film Awards	Best actor in Negative role	Madhumas	Won
2014	7th NEFTA Film Awards	Best actor in Negative role	Madhumas	Nominated
2014	6th D Cine Awards	Best actor in Negative role	Madhumas	Nominated
2014	NFDC Awards	Best actor in Supporting role	Madhumas	Nominated
2017	9th D Cine Awards	Critics' Award	Jhumkee	Won
