= Barsha Siwakoti =

Nepali film actress

- वर्षा शिवाकोटी
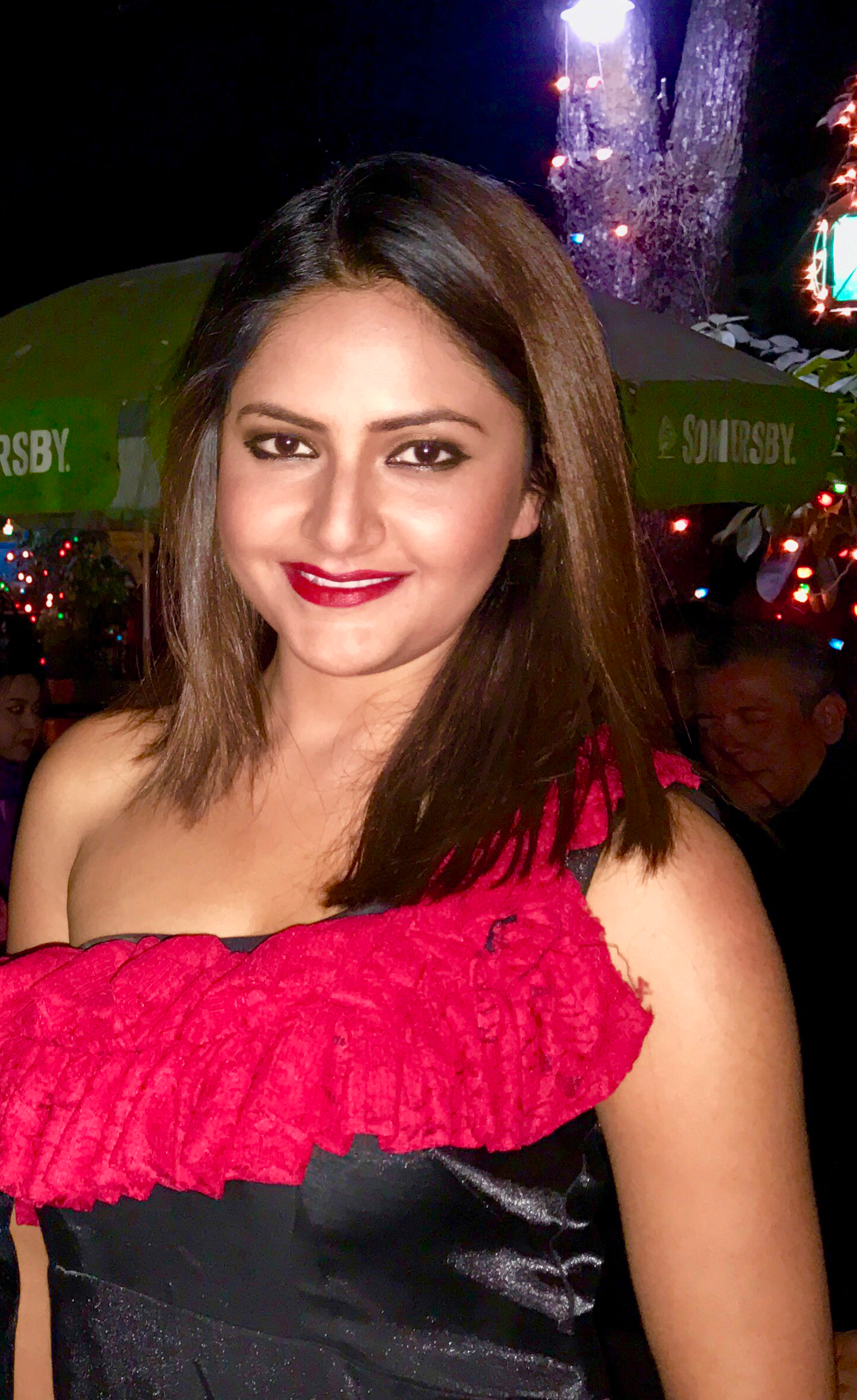
- Born: 6 April 1993 (age 33) kawasoti, Nepal
- Occupations: Actress; model
- Years active: 2014–present
- Notable work: Pashupati Prasad

Barsha Siwakoti (Nepali: वर्षा शिवाकोटी) is a Nepalese film actress and model who works predominantly in Nepali cinema. She made her debut in the Nepali film industry with Nai Nabhannu La 2 (2014). She has also appeared in Pashupati Prasad (2016), Lappan Chhappan (2017), and Bir Bikram 2 (2019).

== Filmography ==
Year	Film	Role	Ref(s)
2014	Nai Nabhannu La 2		
2016	Pashupati Prasad	Bunu	
2018	Lappan Chhappan	Baby	
2018	Bhaire		
2018	Gaja Baja	Gore's girlfriend	
2019	Purano Bullet		
2019	Bir Bikram 2	Badal	
2019	Gopi		
2021	Shree		
2022	Lakka Jawan		
2023	Pardeshi 2		
2024	Chhakka Panja 5		
2025	Magne Raja	Sushree	
2026	Gobar Ganesh		
2026	Kasturee		
2026	Jahajaima		

== Awards and nominations ==
Year	Award	Category	Work	Result	Ref(s)
2016	FAAN awards	Best New actress	Pashupati Prasad	Nominated	
2019	Dcine Awards	Best Actor in a Supporting Role (Female)	Bhaire	Nominated	
2021	Sagarmath Music Award	Best Modern Female Model	'Jyanle Timlai Man Paraune' song	Won	
