= Pradeep Khadka =

Nepali actor, model and filmmaker

- प्रदीप खड्का
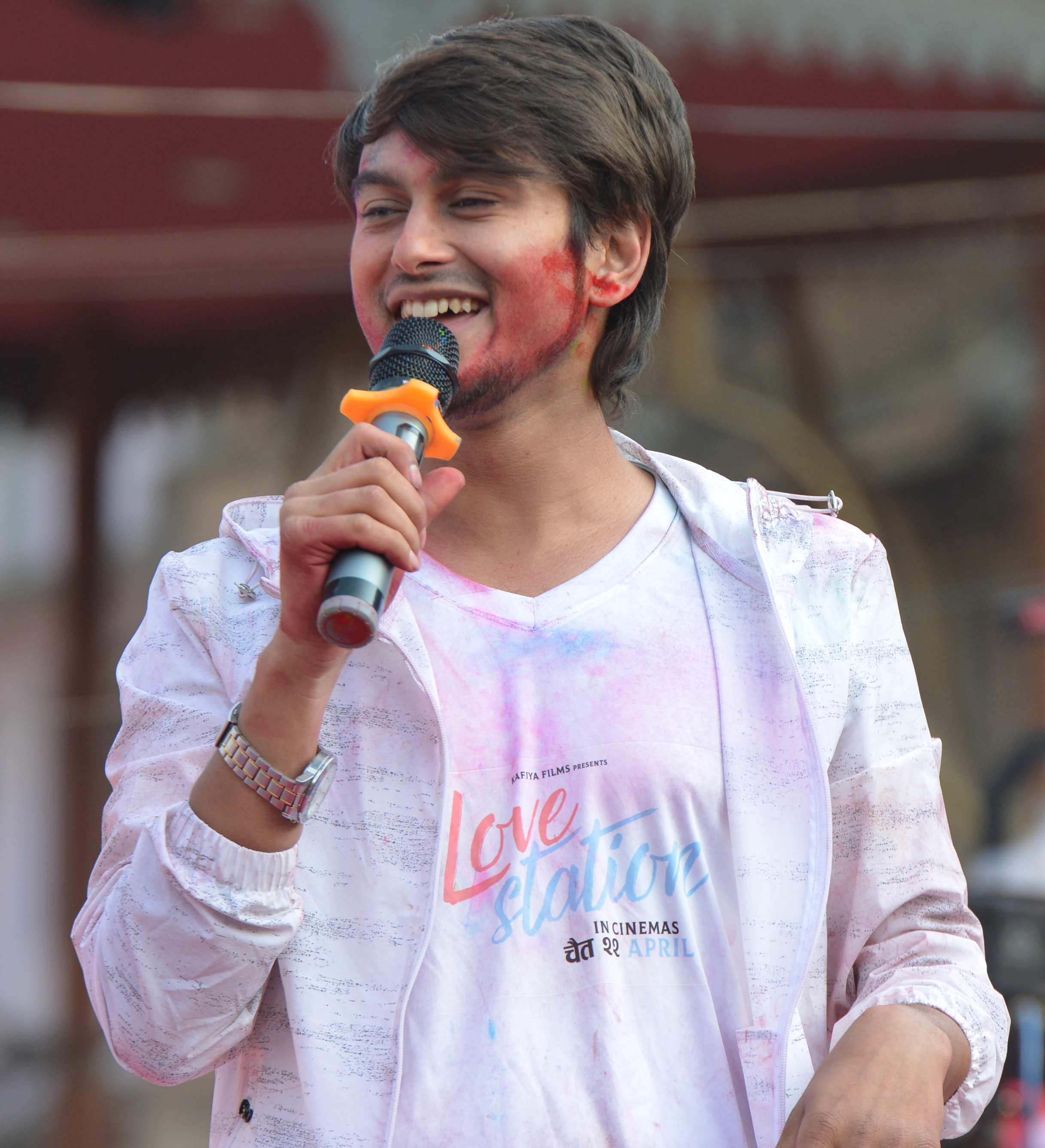
- Born: March 10, 1992 (age 34)
- Citizenship: Nepalese
- Education: Sikkim Manipal University
- Occupations: Actor; model; filmmaker; scriptwriter
- Years active: 2011–present

Pradeep Khadka (born;March 10, 1992) is a Nepalese actor, model, screenwriter, and filmmaker. He is a prominent actor in the Nepalese film industry.

Khadka made his film debut in 2015 with Escape, which did not perform well commercially. His career gained momentum with the success of the romantic drama Prem Geet (2016) with Pooja Sharma, which became a commercial hit and established him as a lead actor in the Nepali film industry.

== Career ==
Following the success of Prem Geet, Khadka starred in its sequel Prem Geet 2 (2017) and the romantic drama Lily Bily (2018), both of which performed well commercially and helped strengthen his position in the Nepali film industry.

After a brief period with fewer releases, Khadka returned to the screen in 2022 with two major films. He played the lead role in Prakash, a social drama that was well received by critics. The same year, he also appeared in Prem Geet 3, which was released internationally and achieved commercial success across several markets. In 2024, he starred in the film Pujar Sarki, a social drama addressing caste-based issues in Nepal.

Khadka has served as a brand ambassador for several international companies operating in Nepa, including Pepsi, TVS Motor Company, and Vivo.

== Early life and education ==
After completing the School Leaving Certificate (SLC) he joined Prasadi Academy and completed higher secondary education in management. He has a master's degree in Business administration.

== Filmography ==
Key
†	Denotes films that have not yet been released

Year	Film	Role	Notes	Ref.
2015	Escape	Abhiyan / Avik		
2015	Prem Geet	Prem		
2017	Prem Geet 2	Prem		
2018	Lily Bily	Aavash / Bily		
2019	Rose	Avi Jung Thapa		
2019	Love Station	Sagar		
2022	Prakash	Prakash		
2022	Prem Geet 3	Prem	Indo-Nepali joint production film	
2024	Pujar Sarki	Maite Bahadur Pariyar		
2025	Aktor: Take One	Kushal		
2025	Pitambar Chapter-1	Pitambar		
2026	Eklo-I	Kalki		

== Awards and nominations ==
In 2018, Khadka was included on Nepali Sansar's Top Actors list. He was placed in 3rd position, after Anmol Kc and Salin Man Bania.

List of awards and nominations
Year	Ceremony	Category	Nominated work	Result
2016	Fan Award	Best Couple With Puza Sharma	Prem Geet	Won
2018	LG Most Popular Actor 2018	Most Popular Actor	Lily Bily	Won
2022	Global Taaj International Film Festival	Best Debut Actor (Bollywood)	Prem Geet 3	Won
2023	Nepal International Film Festival (NIFF)	Best Actor	Prakash	Won
