= Tara Prakash Limbu =

Nepalese music composer and playback singer

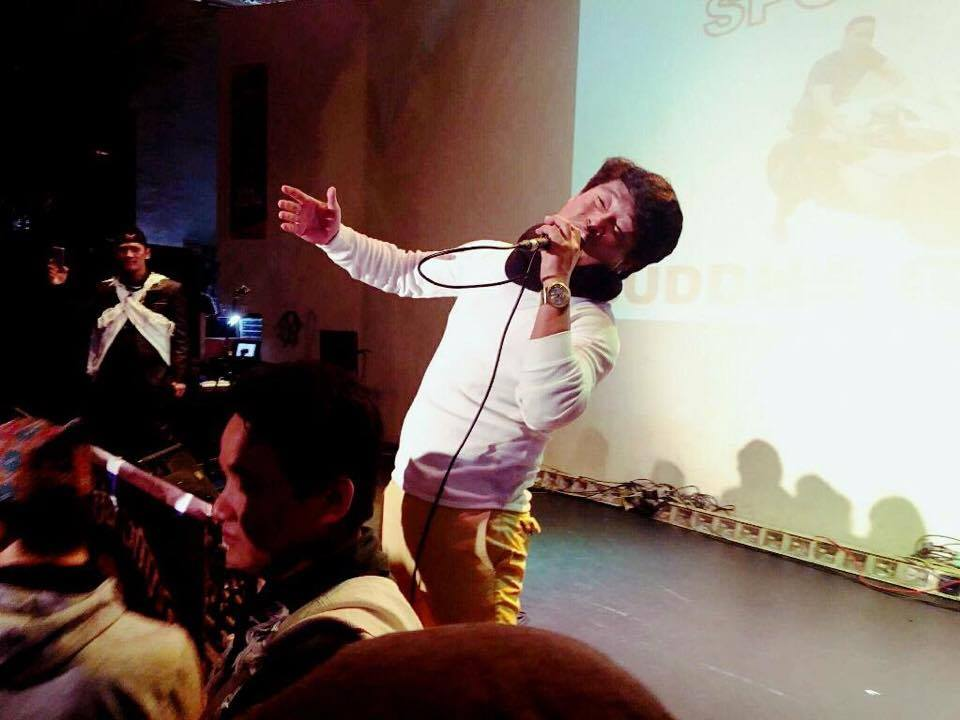
- Tara Prakash Limbu in September 2015
- Born: Tara Bahadur Jabegu; November 29, 1980 (age 45); Sukhani, Jhapa, Nepal
- Other names: Tara Prakash Limbu
- Occupations: Music Composer, Playback Singer
- Years active: 2003-Present
- Spouse: Sarmila Samal Magar
- Children: Bises Prakash Limbu
- Parent(s): Chandra Bahadur Jabegu(Father), Asha Kumari Jabegu(Mother)

Tara Prakash Limbu (Nepali:तारा प्रकाश लिम्बू) is a Nepali music composer and playback singer. Born in Jhapa, he began performing in local gatherings at the age of 6 and made his first career debut with the film Papi Manchhe 2 (पापि मान्छे २). He rose to prominence after composing and recording the song entitled "Baby I Love You" for the Nepali movie Maya Ko Barima (मायाको बारीमा).

Limbu has been the music composer on the film Bir Bikram (बिर बिक्रम), produced and directed by Milan Chams, and composed the song "Sare Sare" (सारे सारे) which is the theme song of the film.

== Awards and nominations ==
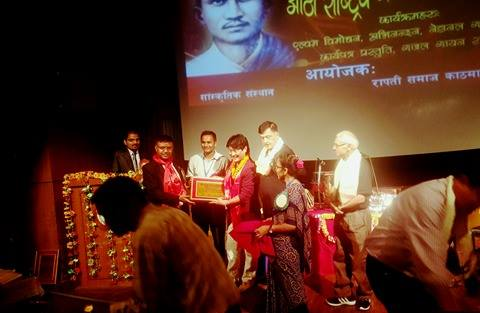
Tara Prakash receiving Eighth Rapati Samaj Award in 2016.

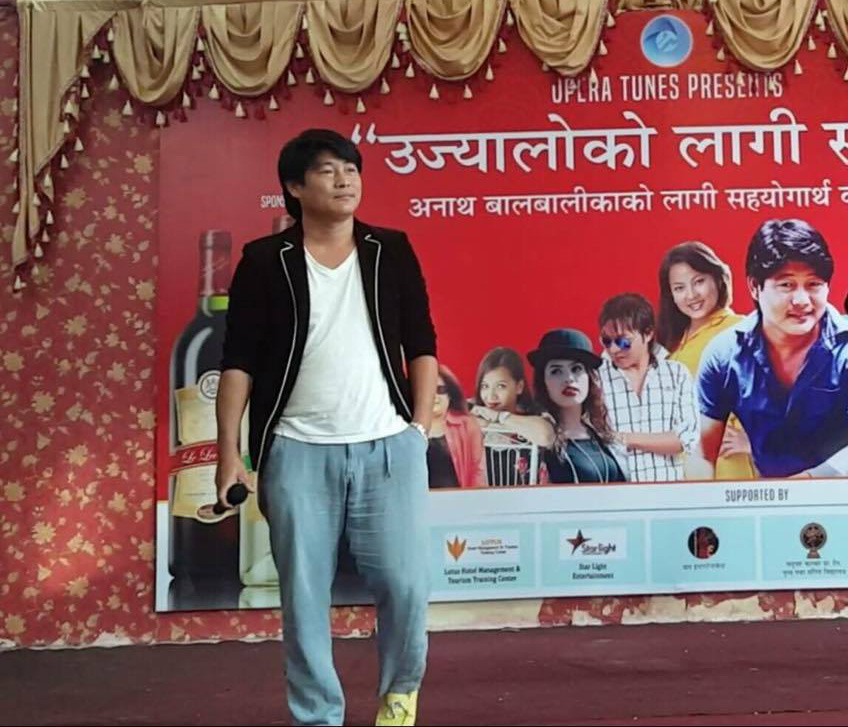
Tara Prakash Limbu Performing in a Musical Concert in Israel organised to collect funds for blind orphanage.

Limbu has won the NFDC Film Award 2072 for Best Musician of the year for the film November Rain.

Year	Film	Category	Result
2015	November Rain	Best Musician of the year	Won

Limbu has won the Eighth Rapati Samaj Award (Nepali: आठौं रापती समाज पुरस्कार) for the Best Musician of the year for the music of the ghazal "Pyudina bhanda bhandai pilayo sathile (पिउँदिन भन्दा भन्दै पिलायो साथिले)"

Year	Ghazal	Category	Result
2016	Pyudina bhanda bhandai pilayo sathile (पिउँदिन भन्दा भन्दै पिलायो साथिले)	Best Musician of the year	Won

Limbu has won the Nepal Box Office Film Award: 2017 for best playback singer from movie Bir Bikram.

Year	Song	Category	Result
2017	Sare Sare (सारे सारे)	Best Playback Singer	Won

== Discography ==
Year	Movie	Songs	Note
2016	Bir Bikram	Sare Sare(सारे सारे)	
2016	Bir Bikram	Najik Hudaichhu, Timilai Chhudaichhu(नजिक हुदै छु, तिमीलाई छुदैछु)	
2016	Bir Bikram	Tal Tal(टल टल)	
2016	Chankhe, Sankhe, Pankhe(चंखे, शंखे पंखे)	Ja Badhdai Ja, Aghi Badhdai Jaa(जा बढ्दै जा, अघि बढ्दै जा)	
2016	Chankhe, Sankhe, Pankhe(चंखे, शंखे पंखे)	Kun Sworgalai Prera Sunya, Dhartima Jharyau ni(कुन स्वर्गलाई पारेर सुन्य, धर्तिमा झर्यौ नि)	
2016	Chankhe, Sankhe, Pankhe(चंखे, शंखे पंखे)	Facebokle bichalli paryo ni(फेसबुकले बिचल्लि पार्यो नि)	
2015	Classic(क्लासिक)	Hare hare jindagi dekhi feri feri hare(हारे हारे जिन्दगि देखि फेरी फेरी हारे)	
2015	Classic(क्लासिक)	Kina man bahakinchha(किन मन बहकिन्छ)	
2015	Classic(क्लासिक)	Prakritiko sundar shrishti(प्रकृतिको सुन्दर सृष्टि)	
2015	Classic(क्लासिक)	Sunaulo har din lagyo(सुनौलो हर दिन लाग्यो)	
2015	Homework(होमवर्क)	Ke sachai timi(के साँच्चै तिमी)	
2015	Homework(होमवर्क)	Haraye ma timro mayama(हराएँ म तिम्रो मायामा)	
2015	Homework(होमवर्क)	Hidda hiddai(हिँड्दा हिँड्दै)	
2015	November Rain(नोभेम्बर रेन)	Timilai k bhanu(तिमीलाई के भनुँ)	Winner, NFDC National Film Award 2072 B.S. for Best Musician
2015	November Rain(नोभेम्बर रेन)	Kasto mitho(कस्तो मिठो)	Winner, NFDC National Film Award 2072 B.S. for Best Musician
2015	November Rain(नोभेम्बर रेन)	Timi bina(तिमी बिना)	Winner, NFDC National Film Award 2072 B.S. for Best Musician
2014	Mayako barima(मायाको बारीमा)	Baby I Love You	
2014	Mayako barima(मायाको बारीमा)	Kasailai nabhannu(कसैलाई नभन्नु)	
2014	Mayako barima(मायाको बारीमा)	Mayako barima(मायाको बारीमा)	
2014	Pritiko Fula(प्रितिको फुल)	Baby I Love You	
2014	Pritiko Fula(प्रितिको फुल)	Dar thiyo malai(डर थियो मलाई)	
2014	Pritiko Fula(प्रितिको फुल)	Bhui jharera k nai bhayo ra(भुई झरेर के नै भयो र)	
2014	Pritiko Fula(प्रितिको फुल)	Pritiko fula(प्रितिको फुल)	
2014	Pritiko Fula(प्रितिको फुल)	Ma bhuldathe, ma bhuldachhu(म भुल्दथे, म भुल्दछु)	
2014	So Simple	So Simple	
2014	So Simple	Badliyo jiwan, badliyo man(बदलियो जीवन, बदलियो मन)	
2014	So Simple	Maile timilai chinna sakina(मैले तिमीलाई चिन्न सकिन)	
2013	Surya Chandra(सुर्य चन्द्र)	Apsaraharuko hulma(अप्सराहरुको हुलमा)	
2013	Surya Chandra(सुर्य चन्द्र)	A rup nagarki rani(ए रुप नगरकि रानी)	
2013	Surya Chandra(सुर्य चन्द्र)	Yo manle tyo manlai roji sakyo(यो मनले त्यो मनलाई रोजि सक्यो)	
2012	I am sorry	Ma chhu yaha mero man...(म छु यहाँ मेरो मन...)	
2012	I am sorry	Sakdina ma sakdina(सक्दिन म सक्दिन)	
2012	Bhul Bhaye Maaf Gara(भुल भए माफ गर)	Timi mero sathi banne ho ta(तिमी मेरो साथि बन्ने हो त)	
2012	Bhul Bhaye Maaf Gara(भुल भए माफ गर)	Bhul Bhaye Maaf Gara(भुल भए माफ गर)	
2012	Bhul Bhaye Maaf Gara(भुल भए माफ गर)	Jogi banayau(जोगि बनायौ)	
2012	Kasam Hajurko(कसम हजुरको)	Kasam Hajurko(कसम हजुरको)	
2012	Kasam Hajurko(कसम हजुरको)	ABC kaa kura chhoda(ए.बि.सि. का कुरा छाड)	
2012	Kasam Hajurko(कसम हजुरको)	Chori chori yo man chori(चोरी चोरी यो मन चोरी)	
2011	Papi Manchhe-2(पापि मान्छे-२)	Jati tadha bho, uti gadha bho maya(जति टाढा भो' उति गाढा भो' माया)	
2011	Papi Manchhe-2(पापि मान्छे-२)	Yo hawale(यो हावाले)	
2011	Papi Manchhe-2(पापि मान्छे-२)	Timi bina man manena(तिमी बिना मन मानेन)	
2011	Papi Manchhe-2(पापि मान्छे-२)	Mana chahe namana(मान चाहे नमान)	

== Philanthropy ==
Beside his musical career, Limbu has also contributed to various charities. He is associated with social causes like working for the underprivileged children, where he contributes to the safety of them by doing charity shows. In October 2015, Limbu was featured in a musical concert in Israel organised by JPLRA Tunes to raise funds for blind and orphanage children.
