= Prem Geet (2016 film) =

- Theatrical release poster
- Directed by: Sudarshan Thapa
- Screenplay by: Ram Sharan Pathak
- Produced by: Santosh Sen, Hari Khatri K C
- Starring: Pooja Sharma; Pradeep Khadka
- Edited by: Surendra Poudel
- Music by: Arjun Pokharel
- Release date: 12 February 2016
- Running time: 137 minutes
- Country: Nepal
- Language: Nepali
- Budget: 1 crore
- Box office: 3.85 crore

Prem Geet is a 2016 romantic film directed by Sudarshan Thapa in Nepal. The film was produced by Santosh Sen & Hari K.C. and features Pooja Sharma and Pradeep Khadka in lead roles. The film was released on Valentines Day 2015. The film met with positive responses from critics and audiences. The film was a commercial success. The film marked a turning point in the careers of the lead actor Pradeep Khadka and Pooja Sharma and made them huge stars. The movie earned much of the investment on its first week of release.

== Plot ==
Prem (Pradeep Khadka) and Geet (Pooja Sharma) meet each other on the way to Kagbeni. Geet escaped from home because of her grandmother's continuous insistence to marry. Prem was on his way due to his personal deeds, but he was too pressurized to marry. Both fake their marriage to get rid of continuous insistence but ultimately fall in love then after. But their fake marriage creates problems, and ultimately they separate. Both try to convince their parents but fail, leading the film towards a tragic ending.

== Cast ==
- Pradeep Khadka as Prem
- Pooja Sharma as Geet
- Saroj Khanal as Geet's father
- Rupa Rana as Prem's mother
- Laxmi Giri as Geet's grandmother
- Norbu Tsering as Hotel Assistant in Mustang
- Rajaram Poudel as Prem's Boss

== Music ==
| No. | Title | Lyrics | Music | Singer(s) | Length |
|---|---|---|---|---|---|
| 1. | "Ma yesto geet gaunchu" | Arjun Pokharel | Arjun Pokharel | Anju Panta, Sugam Pokharel | 3:13 |
| 2. | "Maile Socheko jastai" | Dr Krishna Hari Baral | Arjun Pokharel | Swecha Thakuri, Santosh Lama | 4:31 |
| 3. | "Ma ta alapatra" | Dr Krishna Hari Baral | Arjun Pokharel | Anju Panta, Swaroop Raj Acharya | 2:32 |
| 4. | "Jaba pugchu riverside" | Arjun Pokharel | Arjun Pokharel | Subani Moktan |
| Total length: | | | | | 22m:18s |

== Accolades ==
List of awards and nominations
| Ceremony | Category | Recipient | Result |
|---|---|---|---|
| D cine award Best costume designer - Yubi Thapa Won nefta film award 2016 | Best Choreography | Renesha Rai | Won |
| D cine award Best costume designer - Yubi Thapa Won nefta film award 2016 | Best Lyricist | Krishna Hari Baral | Nominated |
| D cine award Best costume designer - Yubi Thapa Won nefta film award 2016 | Best Singer (female0 | Anju Panta | Won |
| D cine award Best costume designer - Yubi Thapa Won nefta film award 2016 | Best music | Arjun Pokharel | Won |
| D cine award Best costume designer - Yubi Thapa Won nefta film award 2016 | Best Story | Ramsharan Pathak | Nominated |
| D cine award Best costume designer - Yubi Thapa Won nefta film award 2016 | Best character actress | Laxmi Giri | Nominated |
| D cine award Best costume designer - Yubi Thapa Won nefta film award 2016 | Best editor | Surendra Poudel | Nominated |
| D cine award Best costume designer - Yubi Thapa Won nefta film award 2016 | Best actress | Pooja Sharma | Nominated |
| D cine award Best costume designer - Yubi Thapa Won nefta film award 2016 | Best cinematography | Rajesh Shrestha | Nominated |
| D cine award Best costume designer - Yubi Thapa Won nefta film award 2016 | Best actor | Pradeep Khadka | Nominated |
| D cine award Best costume designer - Yubi Thapa Won nefta film award 2016 | Best director | Sudarshan Thapa | Nominated |
| D cine award Best costume designer - Yubi Thapa Won nefta film award 2016 | Best Film | Santosh Sen | Nominated |
| FAAN Awards 2016 | Best character actress | Laxmi Giri | Won |
| FAAN Awards 2016 | Best Lyricist | Krishna Hari Baral | Won |
| FAAN Awards 2016 | Best Singer (Female) | Anju Panta | Won |
| FAAN Awards 2016 | Best actor | Pradeep Khadka | Nominated |
| FAAN Awards 2016 | Best director | Sudarshan Thapa | Nominated |
| FAAN Awards 2016 | Best Film | Santosh Sen | Nominated |
| FAAN Awards 2016 | Best editor | Surendra Poudel | Nominated |
| FAAN Awards 2016 | Best Couple | Pradeep Khadka and Pooja Sharma | Won |
