= Upasana Singh Thakuri =

Nepalese film actress

- Born: 20 September 1998 (age 27); Darchula, Nepal
- Occupations: Actress, Model
- Years active: 2019–present
- Height: 1.7 m (5 ft 7 in)
- Relatives: Jasmine Singh Thakuri Aaradhya Singh Thakuri

Upasana Singh Thakuri (Nepali: उपासना सिंह ठकुरी) is a Nepalese actress. She has appeared in films and is part of a newer generation of performers in the Nepalese film industry.

== Early life ==
Upasana Singh Thakuri was born on September 20, 1998, in Darchula, Nepal, and spent part of her childhood there before moving to Kathmandu, where she completed her schooling. She completed her Bachelor’s degree at Ace Institute of Management in Kathmandu. Her father, Umesh Singh Thakuri, is a retired army officer, and her mother is a housewife. She has two sisters, Jasmine Singh Thakuri and Aaradhya Singh Thakuri. Upasana was an active child, participating in dramas, dance, and program hosting during her school and college days. She describes herself as introverted yet outgoing with family and close friends, and her family has been highly supportive of her acting career.

== Career ==
In 2019, Thakuri made her acting debut in Diwakar Bhattarai's sports drama Captain, co-starring Anmol K.C., produced by Bhuwan K.C. and Jiya K.C’s studio, Super Kajal Films. Her portrayal received mixed reviews from critics. While she was praised for portraying her role effectively, some critics noted her difficulty in expressing a wide range of emotions within the story. For her performance, she was nominated for the Best Debut Actor (Female) award from the Dcine Awards and the NEFTA Film Awards. These nominations recognized her compelling portrayal of characters and her significant impact on the Nepali cinema industry, establishing her as a talented newcomer.

Thakuri's career took an upward turn the same year with her role in Ram Babu Gurung's romantic comedy Kabaddi Kabaddi Kabaddi. The film set the record for the highest-grossing opening of a film in Nepal. Her performance received widespread praise, with one critic noting: "In comparison to her previous role in Captain, Thakuri has improved a lot. In the movie, she is put in different emotional situations, but she skillfully and realistically reflects them in her facial expression, gesture and dialogues". Continuing her promising trajectory, Thakuri signed on for Pravin Jha's "December Falls" in 2021, co-starring with Aaryan Sigdel. This role, beyond comedy, further showcased her acting versatility and ability to adapt to different genres. That same year, she received the "National Navdurga Award" for her dedication and contributions to Nepali cinema, alongside nine other esteemed actresses.

In 2022, she starred in “Dui Nambari” alongside Dayahang Rai and Saugat Malla.The film, directed by Dipendra Lama, was a commercial success at the box office.

In 2024, Thakuri had two film releases. She reunited with Dayahang Rai and Saugat Malla for the comedy social drama “Hattichhap” which released on Feb 2024. Later that year, Thakuri starred opposite Dhiraj Magar in the titular role in “Khusma,” directed by internationally acclaimed documentary director, Ashok Thapa Magar. The film, based on a love story set during the Nepalese Civil War, resonated deeply with audiences. Thakuri felt a strong sense of responsibility toward the project due to its basis in real events and visited locals in Maikot village, Rukum district, to prepare for her role. She admitted to being emotional several times during workshops while hearing about the hardships endured during the conflict. The compelling storyline and the fresh onscreen pairing delivered a layered and emotional performance, amplifying word-of-mouth publicity. The duo's chemistry was widely regarded as the best in the industry. The song "Rukum Maikot" from the movie became the first Nepali film song to trend globally on YouTube, topping Nepal’s music trending list for over two weeks. The song’s popularity contributed to the film’s commercial success. The film received high critical acclaim, with several commentators considering Thakuri's performance her best to date. For her outstanding performance, she was honored with the Best Actress award at the prestigious National Film Awards (Nepal).

== Filmography ==
Year	Film	Role	Ref(s)
2019	Captain	Shreya	
2019	Kabaddi Kabaddi Kabaddi	Kasi	
2022	December Falls	Sadikshya	
2022	Dui Nambari	Balika	
2024	Hattichhap	Laxmi	
2024	Khusma	Khusma	
2025	Karma	Gitanjali	
2025	K Ghar K Dera : Ghar No. 2	TBA	
TBA	Maitighar	TBA	
TBA	Jalaaki	TBA	
TBA	Sumnima	TBA	

== Awards ==
Year	Award	Category	Film	Result	Ref(s)
2019	Dcine Award	Best Debut Actor (Female)	Captain	Nominated	
2019	NEFTA Film Award	Best Debut Actor (Female)	Captain	Nominated	
2021	National Navdurga Award	None		Honoured	
2025	National Film Awards (Nepal)	Best Actor (Female)	Khusma	Won	
