= Aanchal Sharma =

Nepalese actress, model and VJ

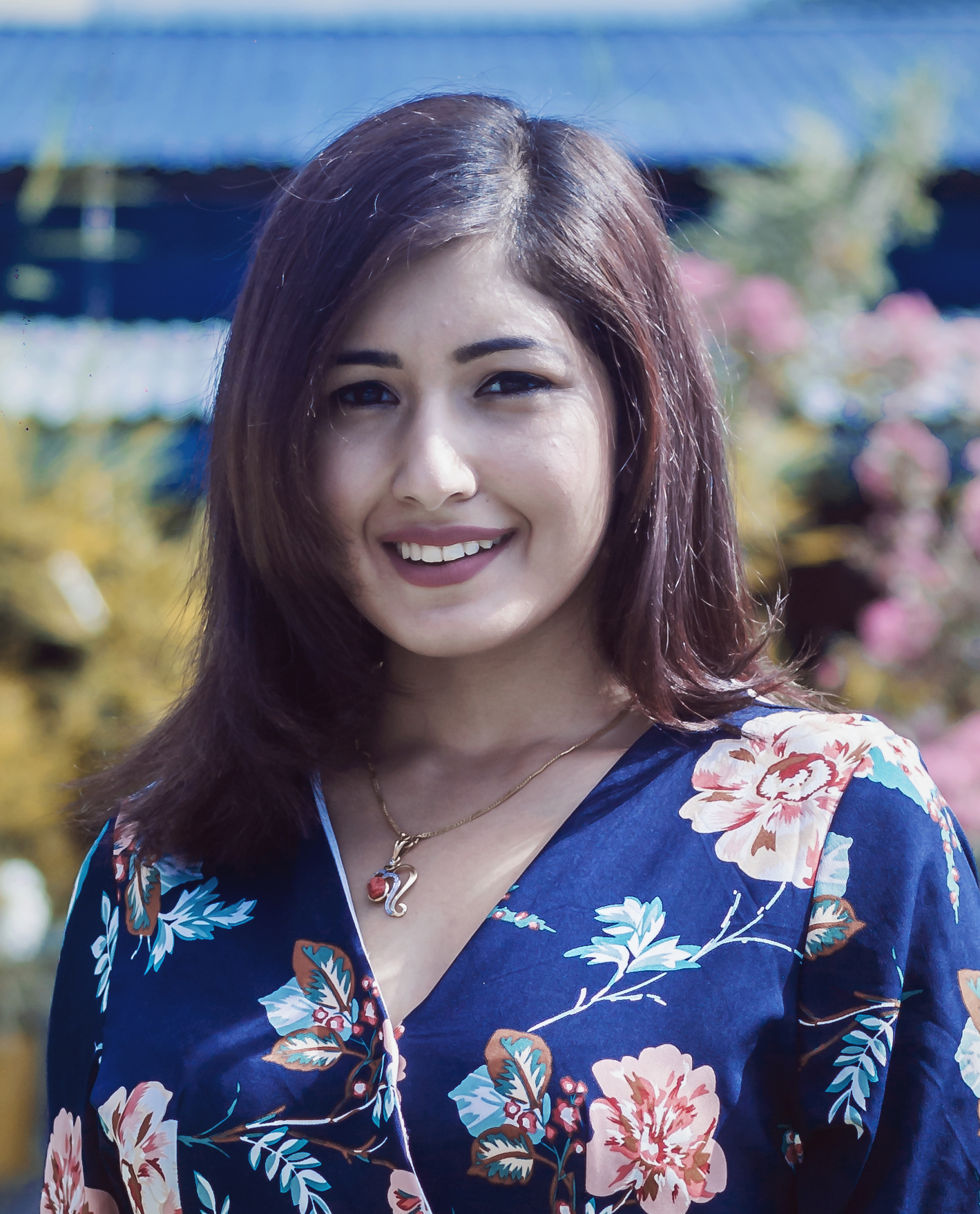
- Born: 1997 (age 28–29)
- Education: Trinity Internation College
- Occupation: Actress
- Years active: 2015–present
- Spouse: Udip Shrestha (m. 2020)

Aanchal Sharma (born March 18, 1995) is a Nepalese film actress. She made her acting debut in the film Nai Nabhannu La 4 (2016). In 2018, she appeared in Shatru Gate (2018) and Johny Gentleman. She was also featured in the Hindi music video "Teri Meri Dastaan".

== Early life and education ==
Born and raised in Kathmandu, Nepal, she completed her higher secondary education at Trinity International College and later pursued her undergraduate degree at Kathmandu International College. Before entering the silver screen, Sharma actively participated in local beauty pageants, won titles, and worked as a television Video Jockey (VJ) and professional model. She made her acting debut in 2016 as the lead in the blockbuster romantic drama Nai Nabhannu La 4, which quickly propelled her to national fame and established her as a leading contemporary actress in Nepal.

== Filmography ==
Year	Title	Language	Role
2016	Nai Nabhannu La 4	Nepali	Aanchal
2017	Johny Gentleman	Nepali	
2018	Shatru Gate	Nepali	
2018	Black	Nepali	
2019	Daal, Bhaat, Tarkari	Nepali	
2022	Jhingye Dau	Nepali	
2022	Hitman	Telugu	
