= Paul Shah =

Nepali actor film actor

Purna Bikram Shah
- Born: Purna Bikram Shah; 23 February 1989 (age 37); Dang District, Nepal
- Occupations: Actor; Model; Video editor
- Years active: 2012–present
- Known for: Nai Nabhannu La 4, Ma Yesto Geet Gauchu, Johnny Gentleman, Bir Bikram 2, Aa Bata Aama
- Notable work: Nepali cinema
- Television: Ghumgham with Paul Shah

Purna Bikram Shah (Nepali: पूर्णविक्रम शाह), professionally known as Paul Shah, is a Nepali film actor and model, known for his work in the Nepali film industry. Known for his roles in romantic and social drama movies, Shah is regarded as one of the prominent actors in contemporary Nepali cinema.

== Career ==
Paul Shah began his career in the entertainment industry as a video editor before transitioning to acting. He made his film debut with the romantic drama Nai Nabhannu La 4 (2016), which introduced him to mainstream Nepali cinema.

Following his debut, Shah appeared in several feature films across various genres. In 2017, he starred in the romantic film Ma Yesto Geet Gauchu, which was commercially successful. That same year, he was featured in the action film Johnny Gentleman, produced by Bikram Basnet and directed by Nitin Chand.

In 2018, Shah appeared in the family drama Shatru Gate, which featured an ensemble cast and received wide theatrical release.

In 2019, he played a leading role in the social drama Bir Bikram 2, a sequel to the earlier film Bir Bikram. The film received mixed reviews from critics. He also appeared in Ma Yesto Geet Gauchu 2, continuing the storyline of the original romantic drama.

== Filmography ==
Key
†	Denotes films that have not yet been released

Year	Title	Role	Notes	Ref.
2016	Nai Nabhannu La 4	Neer	Debut film	
2017	Ma Yesto Geet Gauchhu	Paul		
2017	Johnny Gentlemen	Johnny		
2018	Shatru Gate	Suraj		
2019	Bir Bikram 2	Bir		
2020	Hridaya Bhari	Koshish		
2022	Ma Yesto Geet Gauchhu 2	Paul		
2024	Pujar Sarki	Meghraj Khatri		
2024	Rawayan	Ragav / Kancha	Dual role	
2025	Mayavi	Joy		
2026	Aa Bata Aama			

== Awards ==
List of awards and nominations
Year	Ceremony	Category	Work	Result
2014	Bindabasini Music Award 2071	Best Model of the Year (Pop & Modern Music Category); With Prakriti Shrestha	I Love You Song	Won
2016	8th Dcine Awards 2016	Best New actor	Nai Nabhannu La 4	Won
2016/ 2017	NFDC award 2072 & 2074	Best New actor	*Nai Nabhannu La 4 *Ma Yesto Geet Gauchhu	Nominated
2018	Surya Film Award	Best Actor	Ma Yesto Geet Gauchhu	Won
2022	Dcine Award	Best Actor	Ma Yesto Geet Gauchhu 2	Won
2022	LG Cine Circle Award	Best On Screen Couple Of The Year	Ma Yesto Geet Gauchhu 2	Won
2024	Bindabasini Music Award 2080	Popular Actor Of The Year 2080	Timi Ra Ma Jaam Maya Song	Won
2026	INFA International Nepal Film Award 2026	Best Popular Actor	Mohar / Aa Bata Aama	Won
