= Pujar Sarki =

2024 Nepalese film directed by Dinesh Raut

- Theatrical release poster
- Nepali: पुजार सार्की
- Directed by: Dinesh Raut
- Written by: Bikash Subedi
- Produced by: Subash Bhusal
- Starring: Aaryan Sigdel; Pradeep Khadka; Paul Shah; Anjana Baraili; Parikshya Limbu
- Cinematography: Rajesh Shrestha
- Edited by: Bharat Regmi
- Music by: Subash Bhusal
- Production company: Kingdom Network
- Distributed by: RR Films
- Release date: May 23, 2024 (Nepal)
- Running time: 138 mins
- Country: Nepal
- Language: Nepali
- Box office: रु7.37 crore

Pujar Sarki (Nepali: पुजार सार्की) is a 2024 Nepali film written by Bikash Subedi, directed by Dinesh Raut, and produced by Subash Bhusal under the banner of Kingdom Network. The film stars Aaryan Sigdel, Pradeep Khadka, Paul Shah, Anjana Baraili, and Parikshya Limbu. The film is based on a social issue, the caste system in Nepal.

It released on May 23, 2024 with positive response from critics and audience and became a huge commercial success at the box office and one of the highest-grossing films of the year.

== Cast ==
- Aaryan Sigdel as Pujar Sarki
- Pradeep Khadka as Maita Bahadur Pariyar
- Paul Shah as Meghraj Khatri
- Anjana Baraili
- Parikshya Limbu
- Prem Subba
- Lokendra Lekhak
- Mohan Niraula
- Subash Gajurel
- Tara Sharma
- Bidhya Karki
- Shankar Acharya
- Basant Bhatta
- Govind Raman Parajuli
- Rajesh Bishural
- Raju Gyabak
- Sonam Hayolmo

== Music ==
The first song, Darshan Gare was released on April 19, 2024, it is composed by Karan Raj Karki. The second song, Rimai was released on April 30, 2024, it is composed by Subash Bhusal. The third song, Jaau Maya was released on May 14, 2024, it is composed by Subash Bhusal.

No.	Title	Lyrics	Singer(s)	Length
1.	"Darshan Gare"	Harka Saud	Prakash Saput, Shanti Shree Pariyar	8:46
2.	"Rimai"	Dinesh Raut	Debendra Baral, Muna Thatal	5:12
3.	"Jaau Maya"	B Pandey	Ketan Chhetri	6:06
Total length:				20:02

== Background ==
The first look poster for the film was revealed on January 28, 2024, and the teaser was released on April 12, 2024, across various social media platforms.

This is the writer / director Dinesh Raut's second collaboration with Pradeep Khadka after Prakash (2022) and fourth collaboration with Aryan Sigdel after Mero Euta Sathi Chha (2009), I Am Sorry (2012), November Rain (2014), and Classic (2016). This is also the first collaboration between Pradeep Khadka, Aaryan Sigdel, and Paul Shah.

== Box Office ==
The film earned रु7.37 crore at the Nepal box office.
