= Dinesh Raut =

Nepali filmmaker

- दिनेश राउत
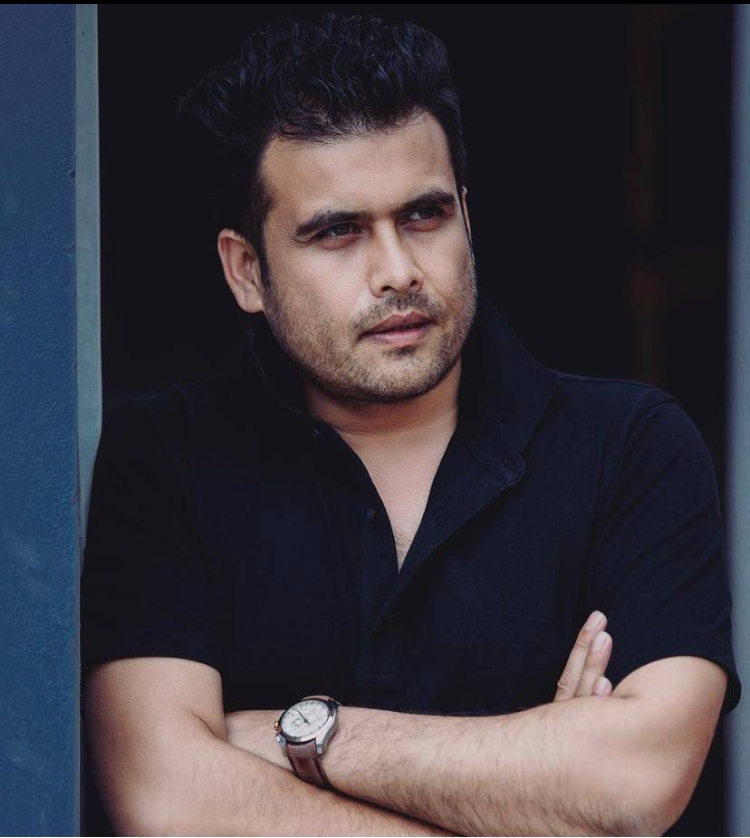
- Born: Dinesh Raut; March 17, 1983 (age 43); Kathmandu, Nepal
- Occupations: Film director, producer, and writer.
- Years active: 2009-present
- Organization: Picture Frame Pvt.Ltd
- Known for: Mahabhoj, Pujar sharki, Prakash Prasad, parva, classic, November Rain and I am sorry
- Notable work: Pujar sharki, Prasad, classic, I am sorry, and November Rain.
- Spouse: Rashmi Timilsina

Dinesh Raut (born 1983; Nepali: दिनेश राउत ) is a Nepali film writer, director, producer and songwriter, He is known for I Am Sorry, November Rain, Classic, Parva, Prasad, and Prakash . Raut is the recipient of several awards, including National Film Awards and many other awards.

== Career ==
Raut started his career at the age of 14 and later worked as an assistant director in the movie "Mero Euta Sathi Cha" before moving into directing. He made his directorial debut with "I Am Sorry" (2012). His biggest success to date is November Rain Nepali Movie, starring Aaryan Sigdel and Namrata Shrestha, from which he received the Box Office Movies Award 2015 for Best Film Director and the CG DCine Award 2015 for Best Film Director.

Raut’s Classic Nepali Movie (2016) also became a big success at the box office and won the National Film Development Corporation (NFDC) Film Director Award. The film also received the Jury Award at the International Nepalese Artist Society (INAS) Award 2016. His next release, "Parva Nepali Movie "(2017), starring Koshish Chettri and Namrata Shrestha, also became a success in the thriller genre.

Raut’s Prakash (2022) is a successful movie in nepali movie industry and earned him several notable awards, including the National Film Award for Best Director, the Nepal Rural Film Festival (NERUFF) 2023 Jury Award, the Spiny Babaaler International Film Festival (SBIFF) 2023 Best Director – Feature Film, and the Pim Nepal Film Festival 2022 Best Director Award. His film Pujar Sharki achieved significant commercial success, becoming the highest-grossing Nepali film in the last 25 years.

== Filmography ==
Year	Film	Credited as			Notes	Ref(s)
Year	Film	Director	Producer	Lyricist	Notes	Ref(s)
2009	Mero Euta Sathi Chha	Chief AD	No	No		
2012	I Am Sorry	Yes	No	No		
2014	November Rain	Yes	No	Yes		
2014	Naaike	No	No	Yes		
2016	Classic	Yes	No	Yes		
2016	Bir Bikram	No	No	Yes		
2017	Parva	Yes	No	Yes		
2018	Happy Days	No	No	Yes		
2018	Romeo & Muna	No	No	Yes		
2018	Prasad	Yes	No	No		
2019	Garud Puran	No	No	Yes		
2020	Selfie King	No	Yes	No		
2022	Prakash	Yes	No	No		
2024	Pujar Sarki	Yes	No	Yes		
2025	Mahabhoj	Yes	No	Yes		

== Awards and nominations ==
List of awards and nominations
Year	Ceremony	Category	Nominated work	Result
2014	Dcine Award	Best Director	November Rain (2014 film)	Won
2016	NFDC National Film Awards	Best Director	Classic (film)	Won
2018	Kamana Film Awards	Best Director	Prasad	Won
2016	INAS Award	Jury Award	Classic (film)	Won
2016	Box Office Award	Best Director	November Rain (2014 film)	Won
2022	Nawoda international film festival	Best feature film	Prakash	Won
2022	National Film Award	Best Director	Prakash	Won
2023	Spiny Babaalar International film Festival	Best Director	Prakash	Won
2023	Nepal Rural Film Festival	Jury award	Prakash	Won
2022	pim Nepal Film Festival	Best Director	Prakash	Won
