= Birendra Agrahari =

Nepalese playback singer

- Birth name: Virendra
- Origin: Butwal, Nepal
- Genres: Pop
- Occupation(s): Singer, musician,

Birendra Agrahari (also spells as Virendra) is a Nepalese playback singer who primarily sings in Nepali, Oriya, Hindi and Bhojpuri languages. He lent his voice for a debut Nepali film Undone By Love starring Dilip Rayamajhi and Jharana Bajracharya in 2004 which was released in Hong Kong and Nepal.

== Early life ==
Agrahari is a native of Butwal, Nepal.

== Career ==
Birendra made his film debut with a song for the movie Pareni Maya Jalaima (Undone By Love) in 2004. He sings for several Nepali films, albums and has performed in many stage shows and events. Birendra sang in the music album Rumal Chhod Jau.

== Discography ==
Below is an incomplete discography:

1. Hiun Bhanda by Suman Chetri & Birendra Agrahari
2. Chal Bolbam
3. Aail Sawan Ka Mahina, from the album Chali Jalwa Chadhaye
4. Juni Juni Sath, from the album Rumal Chhodi Jau
5. Madhur Muskan
6. Chehre Pani
