= Chhetan Gurung =

Nepalese film director (1979–2020)

- Born: 5 February 1979; Nepal
- Died: 9 September 2020 (aged 41); Kathmandu, Nepal
- Years active: 2014–2020

Chhetan Gurung (Nepali: छेतन गुरुङ; 5 February 1979 – 9 September 2020) was a Nepalese film director and writer known for his work in Nepali cinema. He has written scripts for Nepali films including November Rain (2014), Classic (2016), A Mero Hajur 4 (2019), and Prem Geet 3. Gurung debuted as a director from Damaru Ko Dandibiyo (2018), his last film, Prem Geet 3 which he directed in 2019 that will be released posthumously. He died from liver problems on 9 September 2020.

== Career ==
In 2014, Gurung debuted as a writer with November Rain, for which he won the NFDC National Film Award for Best Writer. In 2016, he was nominated for the NFDC National Film Award for Best Writer for Classic. In 2018, he debuted as a film director from drama Damaru Ko Dandibiyo, a film about a former national game of Nepal. Gurung said: "I have taken the film as a good project to use my experiences in the industry and to broaden my horizon. I am excited." Damaru Ko Dandibiyo was critically acclaimed, one critic praised Gurung writing that he did a "stellar job" in the film.

In 2019, Gurung wrote a script for romantic-drama A Mero Hajur 3. In 2019, Gurung directed big-budget drama Prem Geet 3, the film stars Pradeep Khadka and Kristina Gurung in the lead roles. The film was set to be released on 10 April 2020 but was postponed due to the COVID-19 pandemic. In 2020, he was working with producer Santosh Sen in comedy Hututu.

== Personal life and death ==
Gurung was born on 5 February 1979 (Bikram Sambat: 22 Magh 2035). He was suffering from liver problems; on 9 September 2020 he was taken to the Metro Kathmandu Hospital where he was admitted to the intensive care unit (ICU). He died the same day early in the morning.

Film producer Santosh Sen told The Himalayan Times that he had been vomiting blood. Sen added that he was previously on medication and was admitted to the ICU for liver problems. His last funeral rites were performed on 10 September at Swayambhunath; the funeral was attended by director Dayaram Dahal, actor Aaryan Sigdel, actor Pradeep Khaka, actress Jharana Thapa, Santosh Sen, and others.

== Filmography ==
Year	Film	Credited as		Notes	Ref.
Year	Film	Director	Writer	Notes	Ref.
2014	November Rain	No	Yes	Screenplay	
2016	Classic	No	Yes		
2018	Damaru Ko Dandibiyo	Yes	No	Debut as Director	
2019	A Mero Hajur 3	No	No	Screenplay & Dialogue	
2022	A Mero Hajur 4	No	Yes	Screenplay & Dialogue Posthumous release	
2022	Prem Geet 3	Yes	Yes	Posthumous release	

== Awards ==
Year	Award	Category	Film	Result	Ref.
2014	NFDC National Film Award	Best Writer	November Rain	Won	
2016	NFDC National Film Award	Best Writer	Classic	Nominated	
2018	Kamana Film Award	Best Debut Director	Damaru Ko Dandibiyo	Won	
