= Jaba Jaba Maya Bascha =

Nepali romantic drama film

- Directed by: Vijay Thapa
- Written by: Ashok Dhakal; Vijay Thapa
- Produced by: Mani Ram Poudel
- Starring: Jiwan Luitel; Rekha Thapa; Shreejana Basnet
- Cinematography: Govinda Rai
- Edited by: Anil Gautam
- Music by: Sachin Singh
- Release date: 23 November 2011
- Running time: 146 minutes
- Country: Nepal
- Language: Nepali

Jaba Jaba Maya Bascha is a Nepali romantic drama movie directed by Vijay Thapa and co-directed by Ashok Dhakal featuring Jiwan Luitel and Rekha Thapa in lead roles.

== Cast ==
- Jiwan Luitel as Shrawan
- Rekha Thapa as Simran
- Shreejana Basnet as Simran's Mother
- Saroj K.C.
- Mithila Sharma
- Ganesh Upreti
- Sunil Dutta Pandey

== Track Listing ==
| No. | Title | Lyrics | Music | Singers |
|---|---|---|---|---|
| 1. | "Mayalu Mayalu" | Uttam Gaudel, Dayaram Pandey | Sachin Singh | Deepak Limbu, Prabisha Adhikari |
| 2. | "Jaba Jaba Maya Baschha" [Pyaro Pyaro - Happy Version] [Kaile Haanso Oth Bhari - Sad Version] | Uttam Gaudel | Sachin Singh | Deepak Limbu, Prabisha Adhikari |
| 3. | "Timi Bahek Manma" | Uttam Gaudel | Sachin Singh | Sanup Paudel, Sabnam Gurung |
| 4. | "Maya Basai Sarda" | Uttam Gaudel | Sachin Singh | Kama Gyalchen Bomzan |
| 5. | "Nau Danda Yo Katera" | Uttam Gaudel | Sachin Singh | Prabisha Adhikari, Bikash Shrestha |
