= Mitini =

- Directed by: Anish Koirala
- Written by: Brazesh
- Produced by: Prakash Gurung, Krishna Gurung
- Starring: Bipana Thapa; Dilip Rayamajhi; Rekha Thapa; Shivahari Poudel
- Release date: 1 October 2002 (Nepal)
- Country: Nepal
- Language: Nepali

Mitini (Nepali: मीतिनी) is a 2002 Nepali film directed by Anish Koirala.

== Cast ==
- Bipana Thapa (Pooja)
- Dilip Rayamajhi
- Rekha Thapa (Jyoti)
- Uttam Pradhan
- Ram Chandra Adhikari
- Shivahari Poudel
- Pranay Raj Ghimire
- Kusum Sitaula
- Neeta Dhungana

== See also ==
- Cinema of Nepal
- List of Nepalese films
