= Prem Pariyar =

Prem Pariyar प्रेम परियार
- Born: Dhading District, Nepal
- Origin: Kathmandu, Nepal
- Genres: Pop, Folk, Music of Nepal
- Occupation: Singer
- Years active: 2012–present
- Labels: Prem Pariyar; Music Nepal

Prem Pariyar is Nepalese child singer who has performed in nepali movie series Nai Nabhannu La.He has released many Nepalese hit songs which were featured in Nepali movies such as Nai Nabhannu La.

He is popularly known as Kid with a great voice throughout Nepal after the success of his hit songs such as "Yi Aankhama Timi Chheu" and "Marne Kasailai" and has been featured on Nepal Television for an interview.

He started singing at an early age but he started to lose his voice while recording songs Nai Nabhannu La 3.

== Musical career ==
Prem started his musical while he was working in the hostel. After while with his singing skills he got accept to sing in nepali movie Nai Nabhannu La 2. He then started to release more songs for other movies as well.

== Discography ==
=== Movies ===
Year	Title	Credit
2014	Nai Nabhannu La 2	Playback Singer
2015	Nai Nabhannu La 3	Playback Singer
2015	Laati	Playback Singer
2016	Nai Nabhannu La 4	Playback Singer

=== Singles ===
Title	Year	Album
"Yi Aankhama Timi Chheu" ( For Nai Nabhannu La)	2014	Nai Nabhannu La 2 Soundtrack
"Marne Kasailai" ( For Nai Nabhannu La)	2014	Nai Nabhannu La 2 Soundtrack
"Feri Feri Feri Nai Nabhannu la" ( For Nai Nabhannu La)	2014	Nai Nabhannu La 2 Soundtrack
"Marne Kasailai" ( For Nai Nabhannu La)	2014	Nai Nabhannu La 2 Soundtrack
"Maina Raja Maina Rani" ( For Nai Nabhannu La)	2016	Nai Nabhannu La 4 Soundtrack
"Kasham Hamile Khayekai Thiyeu (Male Version)" ( For Nai Nabhannu La)	2016	Nai Nabhannu La 4 Soundtrack

All of his singles have been successful.

=== Albums ===
Title	Year
Nai Nabhannu La 2 (Original Motion Picture Soundtrack) (For Nai Nabhannu La)	2014
Nai Nabhannu La 3 (Original Motion Picture Soundtrack) – With Various Artists (For Nai Nabhannu La)	2015
Nai Nabhannu La 4 (Original Motion Picture Soundtrack) ( For Nai Nabhannu La)	2016

== Awards ==
Year	Award	Category	Nominated work	Result
2014	Online Filmykhabar Award 2071	Best Singer	Nai Nabhannu La 2	Won
