= Classic (2016 film) =

- Theatrical Poster
- Directed by: Dinesh Raut
- Written by: Chhetan Gurung
- Produced by: Subas Giri
- Starring: Aaryan Sigdel; Namrata Shrestha; Priyanka Karki; Romi Ghimire; Shishir Rana; Dayahang Rai
- Edited by: Surendra Poudel
- Music by: Shailesh Shrestha: Rohit Shakya
- Production company: Subash Entertainment
- Release date: February 12, 2016
- Running time: 138 minutes
- Country: Nepal
- Language: Nepali
- Budget: 1.25 crores
- Box office: 4.10 crores

Classic is a 2016 Nepali romantic film directed by Dinesh Raut and produced by Subash Giri. The film features Aaryan Sigdel and Namrata Shrestha in lead roles. The movie is made under collaboration of Subash Entertainment and Aaryan Sigdel Entertainment. The movie features a love story of visually impaired leads. At the 8th Dcine Awards, the movie won for best film.

== Cast ==
- Aaryan Sigdel as Samay
- Namrata Shrestha as Dristi
- Romi Ghimire
- Sushil Kafle
- Shishir Rana
- Priyanka Karki
- Amitesh Shah
- Dayahang Rai
- Bishwa Basnet
- Sunil Rawal
- Samuna K.C.
- Sushil Kafle

== Plot ==
Classic is a musical love story with Aaryan Sigdel (Samay) and Namrata Shrestha (Dristi) as the lead blind characters. Classic takes you through a musical journey of two lovers who go through love, twists and turbulence, success and failure in their lives. Dristi, an aspiring female singer of Blind Aashram meets Samay a band performer, after losing his eyesight he becomes a part of Aashram. Believing in her talent, Samay gives her a helping hand and her career begins to eclipse his.

== Awards ==
List of awards and nominations
Ceremony	Category	Recipient	Result
8th Dcine Awards 2016	Best singer	Yuvraj Chaulagai	Won
8th Dcine Awards 2016	Best editor	Surendra Poudel	Won
8th Dcine Awards 2016	Best actor	Aaryan Sigdel	Won
8th Dcine Awards 2016	Best actress	Namrata Shrestha	Won
8th Dcine Awards 2016	Best film	Subash Ent.	Won
Kamana Film Awards	Best Actress	Namrata Shrestha	Won
Kamana Film Awards	Best supporting Actress	Priyanka Karki	Won
