= Reecha Sharma =

Nepalese film actress and producer

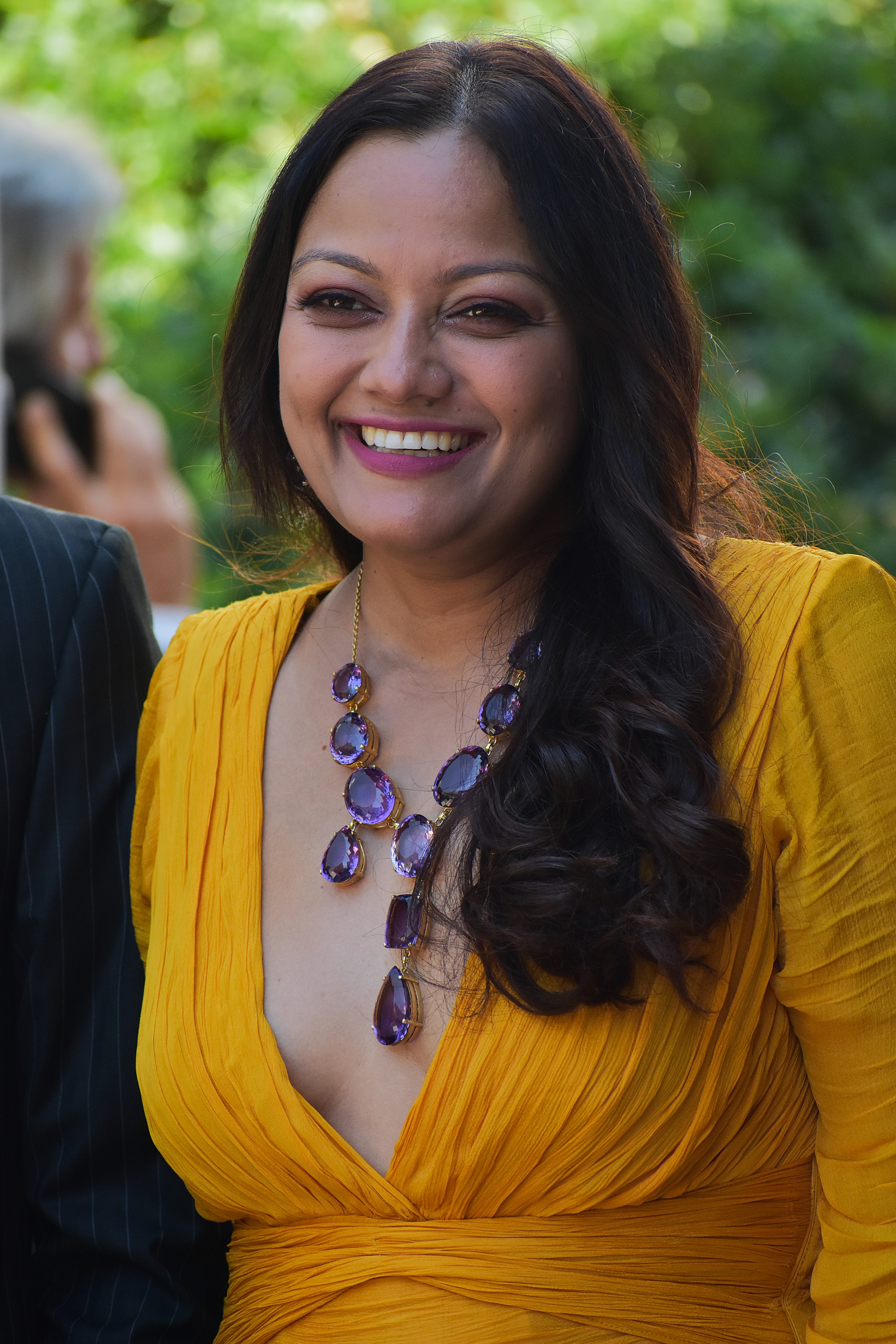
- Sharma at 81st Venice Film Festival
- Born: Dhangadhi, Nepal
- Occupations: Actress; model
- Years active: 2007–present
- Spouse: Deepeksha Bikram Rana (m. 2019)
- Children: 1

Reecha Sharma (Nepali: ऋचा शर्मा; born 16 July 1985) is a Nepalese actress and producer. She is known for her performances in both blockbuster and independent films. One of Nepal's highest-paid actresses, her accolades include an National Film Awards and four Kamana Film Awards.

Sharma made her acting debut in the Nepali film First Love (2010). She subsequently appeared in Mero Love Story and Highway (2011), followed by Loot (2012), which marked a turning point in her career. She went on to appear in the youth-oriented film Visa Girl (2012) and the critically acclaimed Talakjung vs Tulke (2014), for which she won the National Film Award for Best Actress. In addition to her acting career, she is the celebrity endorser for several brands and products. She is also one of the judges of Nepali comedy reality show Comedy Champion.

== Biography ==
Reecha Sharma was born in Dhangadhi, Nepal. She was raised in Kailali district. She now lives in Kathmandu.

She was one of the ten semi-finalists of Miss Nepal 2007 pageant, and has been popular for her acting in music videos and ramps. She made her acting debut in the Nepali film First Love (2010). She then acted in Mero Love Story and Highway in 2011. The most successful box office movie of 2012 Loot marked a turning point in her acting career. She acted in a youth-focused movie Visa Girl in 2012, and critically acclaimed 2014 film Talakjung vs Tulke. In 2015, she played the role of a cop in the featured film Zindagi Rocks.

She is actively involved in various projects related to women and children empowerment. "Unless the activism is grounded on a firm conviction", she says, "it cannot survive the test of time." For her, the awareness of being a woman in a society, where they are deprived of fully realizing themselves individuals, gave impetus for the activism. Unlike many activists, she doesn't consider her activism a separate part of her career, but an inevitable extension of being a woman with a voice in the country, where they have been silenced for too long.’’ Reecha Sharma has acted in 17 movies, two of which she produced herself.

She is married to Deepeksha Bikram Rana in December 2019 in Kathmandu. The actress was in a relationship with Rana for two years. He is the General Manager of Lalitpur-based Labim Mall; she gave birth to a son in September 2021.

== Filmography ==
=== Reality TV Shows ===
Reality TV Shows
Year	Title	Role	Notes
2020	Comedy Champion Season 1	Judge	One of the four judges of the show.
2021	Comedy Champion Season 2	Judge	One of the four judges of the show.
2024	Comedy Champion Season 3	Judge	One of the four judges of the show.

=== Television series ===
TV
Year	Title	Role	Notes
2011	Hamro Team	Seema	Television debut
2016	Pahuch (Reality TV show)	Host	

=== Films ===
Film
Year	Title	Role	Notes	Ref(s)
2010	First Love	Neetu		
2011	Mero Love Story	—		
2011	Highway	—		
2012	Loot	Ayusha		
2012	Visa Girl	—		
2013	Uma	Uma		
2014	Talakjung vs Tulke	Fuli		
2015	Zindagi Rocks	—		
2016	Kerry on Kutton	Jyoti's Mausi		
2016	Bato Muni ko Phool 2	Junali	Cameo	
2016	Ko Aafno	—		
2018	Sunkesari	Sunkesari	Also a producer.	
2018	Chakkar	—		
2018	Na Yeta Na Uta	—		
2022	Hijo Aja Ka Kura			

== Awards ==
Year	Award	Category	Film	Result	Ref(s)
2015	National Film Awards	Best actor (female)	Talakjung vs Tulke	Won	
