= Menuka Pradhan =

Nepalese film actress

- Born: July 6, 1987 (age 38); Gaindakot, Nawalpur District
- Occupation: Actor
- Years active: 2010–present

Menuka Pradhan (Nepali: मेनुका प्रधान) is a Nepalese film actress.

== Filmography ==
Year	Film	Notes	Ref(s)
2010	Shikari 2		
2010	Ek Din Ek Raat		
2012	Visa Girl		
2012	Soongava: Dance of the Orchids		
2013	Vigilante 3D		
2014	Utsav		
2014	Talakjung vs Tulke	Cameo	
2015	Zhigrana		
2015	Resham Filili		
2016	Ko Aafno		
2016	Gajalu		
2016	Purano Dunga		
2017	Hitler		
2017	Jaalo		
2017	Raato Ghar		
2017	Dui Rupaiyan		
2018	Lalpurja		
2018	Sherbahadur		
2018	Saadhe 7		
2018	Damaruko Dandibiyo		
2019	Saili		
2022	The Secrets of Radha		

== Awards ==
Year	Award	Category	Work	Result	Ref(s)
2017	NFDC National Film Award	Best Actor in a Supporting Role (Female)	Purano Dunga	Won	
2017	LG Film Awards	Best On-Screen Couple	Purano Dunga	Won	
2017	Dcine Award	Critics Award	Purano Dunga	Won	
2019	Kamana Film Award	Best Actor in a Leading Role (Female)	Sherbahadur	Nominated	
2020	Kamana Film Award	Best Actor in a Leading Role (Female)	Saili	Nominated	
2021	NEFTA Film Award	Best Actor in a Leading Role (Female)	Saili	Won	
