= Aa Bata Aama =

2026 Nepali drama film by Chandra Pant

- Nepali: आ बाट आमा
- Directed by: Chandra Pant
- Starring: Paul Shah; Bipana Thapa; Pradeep Rawat; Saigrace Pokharel
- Release date: January 30, 2026
- Country: Nepal
- Language: Nepali
- Budget: est.रू1.8 crore
- Box office: est.रू13.20 crore

Aa Bata Aama is a 2026 Nepali drama film directed by Chandra Pant and starring Paul Shah, Bipana Thapa, and Pradeep Rawat, exploring the bond between a mother and her son as he prepares to move abroad for a better future.

Krishna Prasad Subedi, Omkar Pant, Prakashjung Kunwar, Dhruv Prasad Neupane, and Kshitij Dhungana are the producers of the film, while Karan Singh Rasali is the executive producer. The film will be distributed by RR Films.The film explores the deep, heartfelt bond between a mother and her son, following a family's steep sacrifices to send their child abroad for a better life, only for him to grow emotionally distant from his roots.

== Main Cast ==
- Paul Shah as Krishna (the son)
- Bipana Thapa as the Mother
- Pradeep Rawat as the Father
- Simran Pant
- Saigrace Pokharel (Debut role)
- Usha Upreti (Debut role)

== Box office ==
The film grossed रू13.15 crore at the Nepal box office according to the official report by Film Development Board. This film became the highest grossing Nepali films of 2026.

== Aa Bata Aama 2 ==
"Aa Bata Aama 2" is an upcoming highly anticipated Nepali movie. Directed by Chandra Pant, the emotional family drama stars Paul Shah, Malika Mahat, and Aakash Shrestha. The film is scheduled to release on Dashain, specifically on Asoj 30 (October 2026), and follows the success of the original blockbuster "Aa Bata Aama".
