= Sharap =

Sharap or SHARAP may refer to:

== People ==
- Sharap ud-Din, Sultan (1789–1808) of the Sultanate of Maguindanao
- Sharap Yangshet, member of India women's national ice hockey team
- Sharap Alikhanov, Russian chess player who played Alikhan Zhabrailov in the 2018 Russian National Championships

== Other uses ==
- Sharap, a river in Novosibirsk Oblast, Russia that flows from the Novosibirsk Reservoir to the Ob Basin
- SHARAP, a type of private healthcare in Israel
- Sharap, a music video by Koshish Chhetri
- Sharap, a fruit wine in Uyghur cuisine

== See also ==
- Sharapov a Russian surname
