= Sharapov =

Sharapov (Russian: Шарапов, pronounced [ʂɐˈrapəf]) or Sharapova (feminine, Шарапова, pronounced [ʂɐˈrapəvə]) is a Russian surname of Turkic origin. It originates from Şarap, meaning honor, wisdom in Turkic languages. Notable people with the surname include:

- Arina Sharapova (born 1961), Russian television presenter and journalist
- Denis Sharapov (born 1987), Russian football defender
- Margarita Sharapova (born 1962), Russian novelist and short story writer
- Maria Sharapova (born 1987), Russian tennis player
- Ruslan Sharapov (born 1967), Belarusian judoka
- Valeriy Sharapov, Ukrainian professor
- Vladimir Sharapov, a leading character of the 1979 Soviet film The Meeting Place Cannot Be Changed

== See also ==
- Sharap
- Sharapova
- Sharapovo
