= Notebook (2013 Nepali film) =

- Theatrical release poster
- Directed by: Yogesh Ghimire
- Produced by: Joshi Pragya
- Starring: Jivan Luitel, Shen Sapkota, Neeta Dhungana
- Production company: Pragya Films
- Release date: April 2013 (Nepal)
- Running time: 121 minutes
- Country: Nepal
- Language: Nepali

Notebook is a Nepali romance film directed by Yogesh Ghimire and produced by Joshi Pragya for Pragya Films, starring Jiwan Luitel, Shen Sapkota, Neeta Dhungana, Sushma Karki, Sunil Thapa, Dhruba Koirala, Laya Sangraula, Sashita Phuyal, and Pavitra Adhikari.
