= Resham Filili =

- Theatrical poster of Resham Filili
- Directed by: Pranab Joshi
- Written by: Pranab Joshi
- Screenplay by: Pranab Joshi
- Produced by: Madhav Wagle
- Starring: Vinay Shrestha; Menuka Pradhan; Karma Shakya; Kameshwor Chaurasiya; Shishir Bangdel; Samten Bhutia
- Cinematography: Babu Shrestha
- Edited by: Sushil Neupane
- Music by: Kali Prasad Baskota; Almoda Rana Uprety
- Production company: V Motion Pictures
- Distributed by: Popcorn
- Release date: 24 April 2015
- Running time: 135 minutes
- Country: Nepal
- Language: Nepali
- Budget: NPR 6,000,000

Resham Filili is a Nepali movie which follows the friendship, dreams, hopes and deeds of Resham and Hariya - both whethered by bad luck and misfortunes, must at any cost beat the oddest odds to save their lives from Dorje's men.

== Plot ==
Resham Filili (Nepali: रेशम फिलिली) is a Nepali comedy film directed by Pranab Joshi. The movie was on the spotlight after the release of the title song "Jaalma" on YouTube that became an instant hit. It featured Vinay Shrestha, Karma Shakya, Kameshwor Chaurasiya and Menuka Pradhan in lead roles. The film was produced by Madhav Wagle and written and directed by Pranab Joshi.

Resham Filili was produced under the banner of actor Vinay Shrestha's production company V Motion Pictures. This was the second venture of Vinay's production company, VISA Girl being the first.

== Cast ==
- Vinay Shrestha as Resham
- Menuka Pradhan as Sunita
- Kameshwor Chaurasiya as Hariya
- Karma Shakya as Bryan Rai
- Ashutosh Shrestha as Charka
- Shishir Bangdel as Dorje Don
- Samten Bhutia as Dorje

== Reception ==
Resham Filili was released on 24 April 2015, a day before the 2015 Nepal earthquake struck. The earthquake had a huge impact on the earning and screening of the film. However, the film earned about Rs 71 lakhs gross in just one day. The film was re-released on 28 August 2015 in Nepal.

== Soundtrack ==
The official music album of Resham Filili was launched on 15 January 2015 in Gangtok, Sikkim, graced by Sikkim's renowned blogger (Proud To Be Sikkimese) Shital Pradhan, CEO of The White Horse Production Biren Lama and general manager Priyanka Lama and social worker Raghav Chettri. The album has four tracks and a lyrical video of the superhit song "Jaalma".

Title	Artist	Music	Music arranger	Lyrics	Notes
"Resham filili"	Kali Prasad Baskota	Kali Prasad Baskota	Almoda Rana Uprety	Kali Prasad Baskota	
"Jaalma"	Kali Prasad Baskota; Somea Baraili	Kali Prasad Baskota	Almoda Rana Uprety	Manas Raj; Kali Prasad Baskota	
"Lets get lucky tonight"	Sashi Rawal	Kali Prasad Baskota	Gopal Rasaily	Kali Prasad Baskota	
"Jaanina ki mailey"	Shiva Lamichanne; C-awaz	Kali Prasad Baskota	Almoda Rana Uprety	Sabin "ektaare" Kali Prasad Baskota	
