= I Am Sorry =

- Theatrical poster
- Directed by: Dinesh Raut
- Written by: Pradeep Bhardwaz
- Produced by: Hari Mahat
- Starring: Aaryan Sigdel; Keki Adhikari; Shyam Aryal; Neeta Dhungana; Keshab Bhattarai; B.S. Rana
- Cinematography: Purushottam Pradhan
- Edited by: Surendra Poudel
- Music by: Tara Prakash Limbu
- Distributed by: Sahan Movie Makers
- Release date: February 2012
- Country: Nepal
- Language: Nepali
- Budget: NRs 15 Million

I Am Sorry (Nepali title "आई एम सरी" I am sorry) is a 2012 Nepali film directed by Dinesh Raut, starring Aaryan Sigdel, Keki Adhikari, Shyam Aryal, Neeta Dhungana, Keshab Bhattarai, and B.S. Rana. The film's plot focuses on two lovers: Shruti (Adhikari), a millionaire who leaves her home to get away from her hectic and busy schedule; and Guarav (Sigdel), a taxi driver who helps her find new accommodations.

The movie, released on February 10, 2012, received good initial reception. Praise was aimed at its music, cinematography, direction, story, and presentation, as well as Keki Adhikari's performance. Criticism was aimed at Aaryan Sigdel's performance, as well as some scenes including "children of remote areas of Nepal [using] English language with a taxi driver" and "a love story [being] shown in a show for orphanage".

The movie took over 18 months to complete, due to various problems during its making. The filming began during September 2010, but was halted for six months while one of the actors was in the US. Later, complications with availability of actors and set construction delayed the shoot.

The movie is the directorial debut of Dinesh Raut.

== Cast ==
- Aaryan Sigdel
- Keki Adhikari
- Shyam Aryal
- Neeta Dhungana
- Keshab Bhattarai
- B.S. Rana
- Bishal Sapkota
