= Love in Nepal =

2004 Indian film by Rajat Mukherjee

- Directed by: Rajat Mukherjee
- Written by: Sameer Arora
- Produced by: Rajat Arora
- Starring: Sonu Nigam; Flora Saini; Jharana Bajracharya; Richa Ghimire
- Music by: Songs: Nikhil-Vinay; Vishal–Shekhar; Anu Malik; Background Score: Vishal–Shekhar
- Release date: 5 March 2004
- Country: India
- Language: Hindi
- Budget: ₹4.50 crore
- Box office: ₹1.47 crore

Love in Nepal is a 2004 Indian Hindi-language romantic thriller film directed by Rajat Mukherjee which was released on 5 March 2004. The film stars Sonu Nigam, Jharana Bajracharya, Richa Ghimire, and Flora Saini.

== Plot ==
Abby is the creative director of a private advertising agency in Mumbai that is currently experiencing growth. However, the owner has decided to sell the agency to an American multinational, appointing Maxi as the new vice president of the merged entity. Abby and George, an account executive at the agency, oppose the merger, believing that they can grow independently. When Maxi joins the company, she disapproves of Abby's punctuality issues and insists that she work according to her instructions. This sets in motion a series of disputes laced with situational comedy between the new VP and Abby. Maxi decides to shoot a campaign for an important new customer in Pokhara, and their conflict continues there. While directing the shoot from a dinghy on a fast-flowing river, the rope securing the dinghy cuts loose, sweeping Maxi and Abby away on the strong currents. They manage to swim ashore together and realise that they like each other.

A sudden event transforms the film from a light-hearted comedy into a thriller. One evening, Tanya — an attractive native of Pokhara and a fellow passenger on the flight from Mumbai — turns up at Abby's, much to Maxi's annoyance. The next day, Tanya refuses to speak to Abby normally. Feeling hurt and angry, Abby spends the night with Tanya after a night of drinking. However, he wakes up the next day to find her lying dead beside him. He flees the scene, certain that he will be blamed for her murder. He confesses to Maxi and his friend Sandy. While the local police start chasing leads, Abby confides in Bunty, their local guide, and Maxi. They both disbelieve him. He also starts receiving calls from a stranger who makes demands of him. With the police in hot pursuit, he must find out who killed Tanya, why it happened and what he was doing at the scene of the crime.

== Cast ==
- Sonu Nigam as Abhinav Sinha (Abby)
- Flora Saini as Meenaxi Malhotra (Maxi)
- Jharana Bajracharya as Tanya
- Sweta Keswani as Sandhya aka Sandy
- Vijay Raaz as Tony Chang
- Rajpal Yadav as Bunty (Guide)
- Rajendranath Zutshi as George
- Ehsan Khan as Prithvi Singh
- Asif Basra as Ram Mohan or ravan
- Ganesh Yadav as Gajji
- Richa Ghimire as Ruby
- Vishal O Sharma as Negi

== Soundtracks ==
Love in Nepal

Soundtrack album by Anu Malik Vishal–Shekhar Nikhil-Vinay
- Released: 8 August 2003
- Genre: Feature film soundtrack
- Label: T-Series

- Ek Anjaan Ladki Se - Sonu Nigam - Nikhil-Vinay - Sameer
- Bolo Kyaa Khayaal Hai - Sonu Nigam, Sunidhi Chauhan - Vishal–Shekhar - Sameer
- Katraa Katraa - Sunidhi Chauhan - Nikhil-Vinay - Sameer
- Love In Nepal - Sonu Nigam
- Mushkil Hai - Sonu Nigam - Anu Malik - Sameer
- Suttaa Maar Le - Sonu Nigam, Hema Sardesai - Nikhil-Vinay - Sameer

== Reception ==
Taran Adarsh of Bollywood Hungama gave the film one out of five, writing, "On the whole, LOVE IN NEPAL is weak in merits. Lack of hype and face-value will only add to its woes." Anita Bora of Rediff.com wrote, "All in all, a rather lukewarm affair. Despite all the promises to sizzle, the whole act leaves you a little cold in the end. You could, of course, blame it on the plunging temperatures in Nepal."

== See also ==
- Cinema of India
- List of Hindi films
