= Prasad (2018 film) =

- Theatrical release poster
- Nepali: प्रसाद
- Directed by: Dinesh Raut
- Written by: Sushil Paudel
- Screenplay by: Sushil Paudel
- Story by: Sushil Paudel Associate Director: Bikash Shubedi
- Produced by: Shuvash Thapa
- Starring: Bipin Karki; Namrata Shrestha; Nischal Basnet; Basundhara Bhusal; Binod Bhattarai; Prakash Gandarba
- Cinematography: Rajesh Shrestha
- Edited by: Lokesh Bajracharya
- Music by: Songs: Subash Bhusal; Scores: Shailesh Shrestha; Sound Design, Film Mix: Uttam Neupane
- Production company: Shuvash Thapa Production
- Distributed by: Manoj Rathi; Gobinda Shahi; Ujwal Poudel
- Release date: 7 December 2018 (Nepal)
- Running time: 135 minutes
- Country: Nepal
- Language: Nepali

Prasad (Nepali: प्रसाद, lit. 'Offering') is a Nepali language social drama romance film, directed by Dinesh Raut, written by Journalist turned writer Sushil Poudel and produced by Shuvash Thapa under the banner of Shuvash Thapa Production. The film stars Bipin Karki, Namrata Shrestha and Nischal Basnet in the lead roles.

Prasad was released on 7 December 2018.

== Plot ==
Baburam (Bipin Karki) and Narayani (Namrata Shrestha) are a happily married couple in a small village in Kathmandu but problems arise when they find out they can't have a baby. Ramesh (Nischal Basnet) is a friend of Baburam who appears to have his eyes on Narayani.

== Cast ==
- Bipin Karki as Babura
- Namrata Shrestha as Narayani
- Nischal Basnet as Ramesh
- Basundhara Bhusal as Gharbeti Aama
- Rajesh Bishural as Shopkeeper

== Production ==
The film went into production in April, 2018. The film released a trailer in September 2018 with its title track "Lai Lai". The song became successful. The trailer of the film was released in November 2018.

== Reception ==
The film received mostly positive reviews from the critics. Online Khabar have praised the film for its realistic storyline and its impressive cinematography.

== Soundtrack ==
Track listing
No.	Title	Lyrics	Music	Singer(s)	Length
1.	"Lai Lai"	Ganesh Shahi	Subash Bhusal	Ketan Chettri	5:05
2.	"Banki Chari"	B.Pandey	Subash Bhusal	Rupak Dotel, Anju Panta	5:24
3.	"Barai Kayari Bachaulaa"	Subash Bhusal	Subash Bhusal	Bikram Baral	3:32

== Accolades ==
Distributor	Date aired	Category	Recipient	Result
Dcine Awards 2076	4 May 2019	Best Actor in a Leading Role (male)	Bipin Karki	Nominated
Dcine Awards 2076	4 May 2019	Best Actor in a Leading Role (female)	Namrata Shrestha	Won
Dcine Awards 2076	4 May 2019	Best Actor in a Negative Role	Nischal Basnet	Nominated
Dcine Awards 2076	4 May 2019	Best Director	Dinesh Raut	Nominated
Dcine Awards 2076	4 May 2019	Best Movie	Shuvash Thapa	Nominated
Dcine Awards 2076	4 May 2019	Best Story	Sushil Paudel	Nominated
Dcine Awards 2076	4 May 2019	Best Screenplay	Sushil Paudel	Nominated
Dcine Awards 2076	4 May 2019	Best Dialogue	Sushil Paudel	Won
Dcine Awards 2076	4 May 2019	Best Movie Director (Movie Folk Songs)	Subash Bhusal	Nominated
Dcine Awards 2076	4 May 2019	Best Lyricist	Ganesh Shahi	Nominated
Dcine Awards 2076	4 May 2019	Best Playback Singer (male)	Ketan Chettri	Nominated
Dcine Awards 2076	4 May 2019	Best Sound Mixing	Uttam Neupane	Nominated
Dcine Awards 2076	4 May 2019	Best Background Score	Shailesh Shrestha	Nominated
National Film Awards 2075	2019	Best Actor (male)	Bipin Karki	Won
