= Kohi Mero =

- Theatrical poster
- Directed by: Alok Nembang
- Written by: Prawin Adhikary, Alok Nembang
- Produced by: Suraj Bansal
- Starring: Jharana Bajracharya; Aaryan Sigdel; Sanchita Luitel; Dinesh Sharma; Tripti Nadakar
- Cinematography: Raju Bikram Thapa
- Edited by: Subodh Shrestha, Prakash Tuladhar
- Music by: Suresh Adhikary, Basant Sapkota, Suresh Rai
- Distributed by: Movies.com Pvt.Ltd
- Release date: September 2010
- Country: Nepal
- Language: Nepali
- Budget: NRs 5.5 million

Kohi Mero is a 2010 Nepali film directed by Alok Nembang under the banner of Movies.com. This romantic drama marks the comeback of Jharana Bajracharya and stars Aryan Sigdel, Sanchita Luitel and introduces Subash Thapa in lead roles.

== Plot ==
Kohi Mero is a story following four friends Abhi, Ashna, Prayash, and Dibya, who navigate love and friendship. Ashna and Prayash are separated by circumstance from Abhi, who prioritizes his ambition over their friendship. Years later, Abhi faces a choice between maintaining his friendship and pursuing a romantic relationship.

Similarly, Ashna faces the choice between being true to herself and doing right by her family and society. Love demands sacrifice, they all learn: the bigger the sacrifice, the sweeter the reward, sometimes as freedom, and sometimes as the knowledge that the person you love has gained everything you'd wish for them.

"Kohi Mero" is a story about the search for that special person and the special sacrifice it takes for us to show our love for each other.

== Cast ==
- Jharana Bajracharya
- Aaryan Sigdel
- Sanchita Luitel
- Subash Thapa
- Dinesh Sharma
- Radha Lamsal
- Tripti Nadakar

== Soundtrack ==
Kohi...Mero

Soundtrack album by Various Artists
- Released: 17 August 2010
- Genre: Film soundtrack
- Label: Music Dot Com

Tracklist
No.	Title	Singer(s)	Length
1.	"Pakha Na Pakha"	Satya Raj Acharya	4:37
2.	"Aankha Aankha"	Deepak Limbu, Anju Panta	4:46
3.	"Dherai Din"	Deepak Limbu	6:01
4.	"Sabda Ma"	Swaroop Raj Acharya	7:22
5.	"Kohi Mero"	Deepak Limbu, Anju Pant	5:00
6.	"Samayale"	Shiva Pariyar, Rajina Rimal	4:44
7.	"Kohi Mero"	Deepak Limbu	5:00
8.	"Kohi Mero"	Anju Pant	5:00
