= Aaryan Sigdell =

Nepalese film actor

- आर्यन सिग्देल
- Born: Harish Sigdel; August 5, 1981 (age 45); Gothikada, Surkhet, Nepal
- Other names: Aaryan, Harish
- Occupation: Actor
- Years active: 2003–present
- Spouse: Sapana Bhandari (m. 2014)
- Children: 1

Harish Sigdel (born 5 August 1981), better known as Aaryan Sigdell (Nepali: आर्यन सिग्देल,), is a Nepalese film actor known for his work in Nepali Cinema. He is known for his wide range of roles.

Aaryan Sigdel debuted in Kismat in 2007 and then played the lead role in the romantic-drama Mero Euta Saathi Chha as a young royal spoilt brat. The film was inspired by the Korean hit A Millionaire's First Love. His portrayal of Jay Shamsher Junga Bahadur Rana was highly appreciated and generated a fan base for him, and he has seen ups and downs in his career.

== Early life ==
Aaryan Sigdel was born in Gothikada of Surkhet district on 5 August 1981. Later, his family moved to Thankot, Kathmandu, where he spent most of his childhood.

== Personal life ==
Sigdel married Sapana Bhandari on 19 April 2014. They have one son, who was born in 2019.

== Career ==
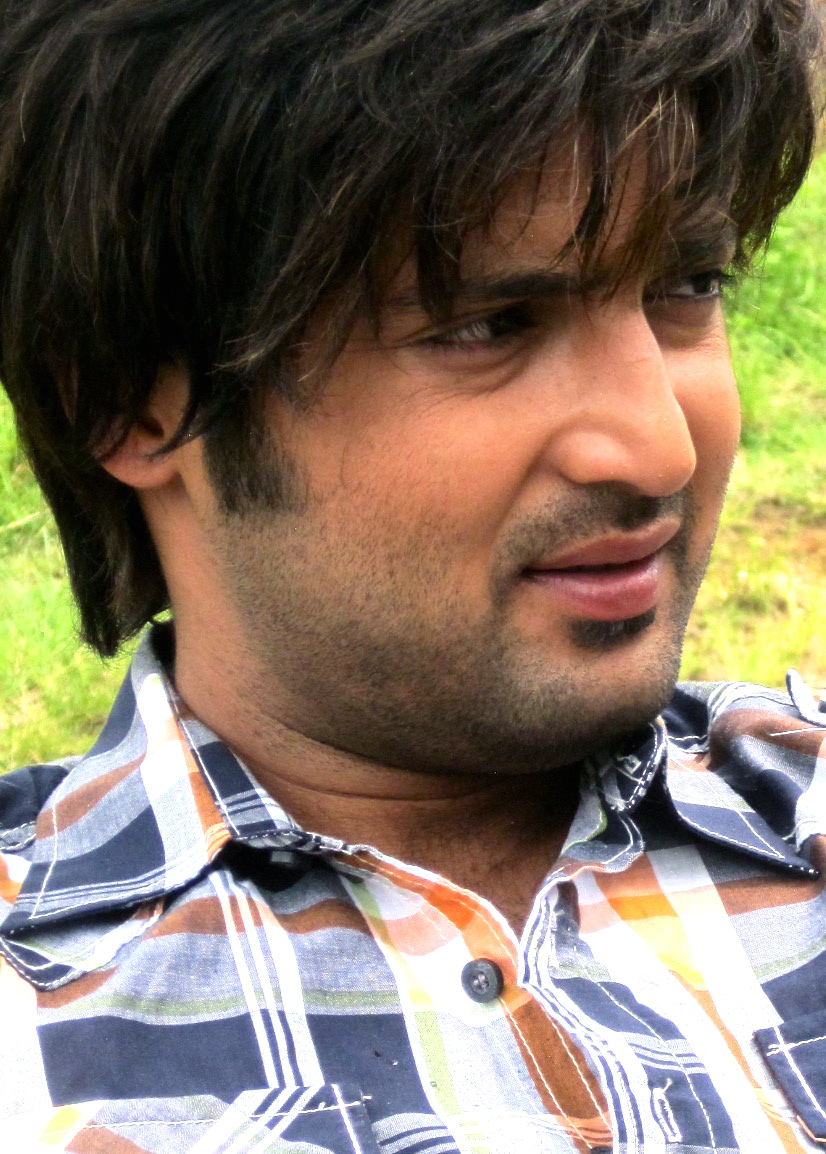
Sigdel at the set of Kohi Mero (2010)

Sigdel's first lead role was in Kismat in 2007, opposite Biraj Bhatta and Rekha Thapa. Kismat was the highest-grossing film of the year and won a National Film Award. It was directed by Ujwal Ghimire. His second role was in Mausam, which became an average hit at the box office. In 2009, his third film, Mero Euta Saathi Cha, was released and met with a positive response from critics and the audience.

In 2010, his six films were released. Two of his films, Kohi Mero and Bandhi, did not do well at the box office, while the sixth release, Kasle Choryo Mero Man, opposite Rekha Thapa, broke all the records at the box office and became one of the biggest hits in Nepali cinema. Though the rumours of fallout between the pair (him and Rekha Thapa), is heard quite often but their pair is said to be the best onscreen pair in Nepali films compared to that of Rajesh Hamal and Karishma Manandar and Nikhil Upreti and Arunima Lamsal.

== Filmography ==
Key
†	Denotes films that have not yet been released

Year	Film	Role	Notes	Verdict	Ref(s)
2003	Bir Ganeshman		Debut film		
2007	Kismat	Ram		Superhit	
2007	Sindoor		Tele film	—N/a	
2008	Mausam	Manav		Average	
2008	Jindagi: always compromise (Image Channel TV series)	Ishan	Tele film	—N/a	
2009	Mero Euta Saathi Chha	Jai		Blockbuster	
2010	Hifajat	Rocky		SuperHit	
2010	First Love	Aayush		SuperHit	
2010	The Flash Back: Farkera Herda	Sirish		SuperHit	
2010	Kohi Mero	Abhi		Hit	
2010	Bandhi	Harish		Flop	
2010	Kasle Choryo Mero Man	Adi		Blockbuster	
2011	K Yo Maya Ho	Ram		Hit	
2011	Mero Love Story	Avash		Average	
2012	I Am Sorry	Gaurav/Yuvraj		Average	
2012	K Ma Timro Saathi Banna Sakchhu	Ankit		Hit	
2012	Dhuwaa Yo Nasha	Avi		Flop	
2013	Kollywood	Safal		Flop	
2013	Mahasush	Prem		Average	
2013	Dabab	Bishal		Flop	
2013	Loafer	Inspector Sigdel		Flop	
2013	Madhumas	Prem		Average	
2014	November Rain	Aayush		SuperHit	
2014	Sapana	Raj		Average	
2014	Lajja	Daya		Superhit	
2014	Naike			Average	
2014	Mala			Flop	
2014	Alvida	Farhan Khan		Flop	
2014	Punarjanma			Flop	
2014	Aabeg			Flop	
2014	Sathi	Aryan		Flop	
2015	Nai Nabhannu La 3	Prakash		SuperHit	
2015	SuShree			Flop	
2016	Classic	Samay		Hit	
2016	Chhakka Panja	—N/a	Cameo.	Blockbuster	
2016	Homework	Hari Krishna / Aaryaman	Dual role.	Hit	
2017	Rudrapriya	Bala		Average	
2018	Kaira	Jay		Average	
2019	Hajar Juni Samma	Siddhanta Kshetry		Average	
2019	Cha Cha Hui	Prem		Flop	
2022	December Falls	Samrat		Flop	
2024	Pujar Sarki	Pujar Sarki		SuperHit	
TBA	Sayara				

== Awards ==
2) National Award for best Actor (Mero Euta Saathi Chha)

Year	Award	Category	Nominated work	Result	Ref(s)
2008	National Film Awards	Best Actor	Mausam	Won	
2010	National Film Awards	Best Actor	Kohi Mero	Won	
2014	INFA Awards (Hong Kong)	Best Actor	Mahasush	Won	
2014	NFDC Awards	Best Actor	Mahasush	Won	
2014	Kamana Film Awards	Best Actor	Mahasush	Won	
2015	NEFTA Awards	Best Actor	November Rain	Nominated	
2015	NEFTA Awards	Popular actor of the year	November Rain	Nominated	
2016	FAAN Awards	Best Actor	Classic	Won	
2016	NEFTA Awards	Best Actor	Classic	Nominated	
2016	Dcine Awards	Best Actor	Classic	Won	
2016	NFDC Awards	Best Actor	Classic	Won	
2016	Kamana Film Awards	Best Actor	Classic	Pending	
