= Damaru Ko Dandibiyo =

2018 Nepalese film

Damaruko Dandibiyo
- Directed by: Chhetan Gurung
- Written by: Khagendra Lamichhane
- Produced by: Binod Gurung; Norbu Tshering Ghale
- Starring: Khagendra Lamichhane; Anup Baral; Menuka Pradhan
- Release date: 4 May 2018 (Nepal)
- Country: Nepal
- Language: Nepali

Damaru Ko Dandibiyo is 2018 Nepalese drama sport film directed by Chhetan Gurung and written by Khagendra Lamichhane. The film is produced by Binod Gurung and Norbu Tshering Ghale under the banner of Sambridhi Entertainment. The film stars Khagendra Lamichhane, Anup Baral, Menuka Pradhan, Budhhi Tamang, Ankeet Khadka, Aashant Sharma, and Laxmi Bardewa in the lead roles.

== Plot ==
Damaru (Khagendra Lamichhane) comes to his village to revive the old forgotten sport Dandi Biyo. His father Yogendra (Anup Baral), a former Dandi Biyo player opposes the idea of reviving the game.

== Cast ==
- Khagendra Lamichhane as Damaru
- Menuka Pradhan as Mala
- Buddhi Tamang as Mukihya
- Anup Baral as Yogendra
- Laxmi Bardewa as Nirmala
- Ashant Sharma as Kasiram

== Soundtrack ==
No.	Title	Lyrics	Music	Singer(s)	Length
1.	"Teete Paate"	Kali Prasad Baskota, Ektare, Hark Saud	Kali Prasad Baskota	Kali Prasad Baskota	4:49
2.	"Gantabya"	Sabin Ektarey	Kali Prasad Baskota	Rikesh Gurung, Bidhya Tiwari	4:58
