= Xira =

2019 Nepali action film

- Theatrical release poster
- Directed by: Ashutosh Raj Shrestha
- Written by: Ashutosh Raj Shrestha
- Starring: Namrata Shrestha; Anoop Bikram Shahi; Promod Agrahari; Srijana Regmi; Raymon Das Shrestha; Suzta Shrestha; Samrat Magar
- Release date: 23 August 2019 (Nepal)
- Country: Nepal
- Language: Nepali

Xira is a 2019 Nepali action film directed and written by Ashutosh Raj Shrestha. It stars Namrata Shrestha, Anoop Bikram Shahi, Promod Agrahari, Srijana Regmi, Raymon Das Shrestha, Suzta Shrestha, Samrat Magar.

== Cast ==
- Namrata Shrestha as Xira
- Anoop Bikram Shahi as Xira's husband
- Promod Agrahari as Raja
- Srijana Regmi as Bullet
- Samrat Magar as Xira's coach
- Raymon Das Shrestha
- Suzta Shrestha as Shilu

== Reception ==
Diwakar Pyakurel of OnlineKhabar wrote, "Xira might have numerous limitations in terms of the story as well as presentation. The movie, of course, could have been more enriched and powerful. Its cinematographic review might point at other dimensions of strengths and weaknesses. But, from the feminist point of view, Xira is one of the few Nepali films that celebrate the feminine power to defy patriarchal restrictions". Abhimanyu Dixit of The Kathmandu Post wrote, "You want to like Xira, you really do, but it just won't let you". Sunny Mahat of The Annapurna Express wrote, "What the movie actually promised as the first ever MMA-based film was a ‘feast of fury’ combined with a lot of action-packed sequences. But, alas, gross negligence in many aspects of filmmaking make "Xira" not even worth sitting through its short 1 hr 35 mins length".
