= Bipana Thapa =

Nepalese actress, model (born 1977)

- Born: Bipana Thapa; 29 August 1977 (age 48); Kathmandu, Nepal
- Occupations: Actress; fashion designer
- Years active: 1995–2008
- Height: 1.68 m (5 ft 6 in)
- Spouse: Ashutosh Bhardwoj (m. 2008)

Bipana Thapa (Nepali: विपना थापा, born 29 August 1977) is a Nepalese actress. Bipana had been active in Nepali film industry until she got married in 2008 to Ashutosh Bhardwoj.

Bipana Thapa was born in Kathmandu. She was one of the prominent actress of Nepal in 90's. In addition to acting Bipana was also into fashion designing business. She used to design her own costumes for her roles in her movies. Her design business Bipanaz Boutique was located at Bhatbhateni, Kathmandu.

She make an acting debut in 1993 with tele-serial Nirdosh Kaidi which was huge hit after success of nirdosh kaidi. She appeared in a feature film JanaBhumi (1995) with Saroj Khanal following the success of her debut film.

== Early life ==
Born in Kathmandu, Nepal, on 29 August 1977, Bipana Thapa was influenced by her father's vision for her to pursue acting. Despite losing him early in life, his ambition remained a driving force in her career.

== Career ==
=== Early breakthrough and stardom (1993–2008) ===
Thapa debuted at 13 in the TV serial Nirdosh Kaidi (1993). She entered films with Janmabhumi (1995) at 14, becoming a dominant Kollywood actress with over 80 films. Known for roles in Apsara and Muglan with co-stars like Rajesh Hamal, she also ran "Bipanaz Boutique," designing her own on-screen costumes. She married in April 2008 and moved to India.

=== Hiatus and character comeback (2024–present) ===
After a 16-year break, Thapa returned in Hrashwo Deergha (2024). She transitioned to character roles, appearing in *Aa Bata Aama* (2026).

== Filmography ==
List of Bipana Thapa film credits
| Year | Title |
|---|---|
| 1995 | Janma Bhoomi |
| 2000 | Apsara |
| 2000 | Aago |
| 2000 | Tan Ta Sarai Bigris Ni Badri |
| 2001 | Ke Bho Lau Na Ni |
| 2002 | Mitini |
| 2002 | Sahid Gate |
| 2002 | Bakshis (as Bipna Thapa) |
| 2003 | Gaazal (as Gaazal) |
| 2005 | Nagad narayan (as Shova Bhauju) |
| | Khyal Khyalaima |
| 2026 | Aa Bata Aama (as Devaki) |

== Awards ==
| SN | Award Title | Film Name / Project | Year | Result / Reference |
|---|---|---|---|---|
| 1 | Hamro Swabhimaan National Award | Contribution to Nepalese Cinema | 2023 | Won |
| 2 | Embassy Felicitation & Contribution Honor | Lifetime Contribution to Nepali Cinema | 2026 | Won |
