= First Love (2010 Nepali film) =

- Directed by: Simosh Sunuwar
- Written by: Prachandra Shrestha
- Produced by: Madhav Wagle; Narendra Maharjan
- Starring: Reecha Sharma; Aaryan Sigdel; Nisha Adhikari; Binaya Shrestha; Karma Shakya
- Cinematography: Hari Humagain
- Music by: Satya Swarop; Surendra man Singh
- Production company: Princess Movie pvt ltd.
- Release date: 6 August 2010
- Country: Nepal
- Language: Nepali
- Budget: NRs 7 Lakhs

First Love is 2010 Nepali romantic movie directed by Simosh Sunuwar starring Aaryan Sigdel, Reecha Sharma, Nisha Adhikari, Karma and Binaya . It tells of a love story forming between three close friends and two girls.

== Cast ==
- Nisha Adhikari as Aabha
- Reecha Sharma as Neetu)
- Aaryan Sigdel as AAyush
- Karma Shakya as Gaurav
- Vinay Shrestha as Rohan
- Namrata Shrestha in Guest Appearance as an RJ.
