= Zhigrana =

- Film poster
- Directed by: Pasang Lama
- Written by: Pasang Lama
- Produced by: Santosh Shahi, Neev Pradhan, Pasang Lama
- Cinematography: Shailendra D. Karki
- Edited by: Nimesh Shrestha
- Music by: Iman Shah
- Production company: Golden Yak Entertainment
- Distributed by: Popcorn Pictures
- Release date: March 6, 2015
- Running time: 120 minutes
- Country: Nepal
- Budget: NPR 1,200,000

Zhigrana is a 2015 Nepali film written and directed by Pasang Lama.

Zhigrana is a suspenseful thriller movie produced by Golden Yak Entertainment. The movie won two National Awards for Best Cinematography and Best Editing. It also won the NEFTA award for Best Screenplay. This movie's leading actress is the first foreign actress (German) to star in a leading role acting and speaking in Nepali in the history of Nepali cinema.

== Plot ==
Christine Summers has been working in an NGO in Nepal for the past four years. Her boss assigns her to do a last mission in Ruku to collect information of the life outside of the cities, before she leaves for the United States. Leaving for the mission with her crew and her guide; they take shelter in a small village called Zhigrana; an area known for a killer on the loose who sacrifices humans in the name of Kaal Panchami, a mythical ghost.

When they start to turn against each other regarding a death of a friend and with no one to trust: it is now up to Christine to figure out who the killer is. Is it the ghost of Kaal Panchami or is the truth even stranger than that?

The movie starts with a news broadcaster delivering the news of a killer who kills and sacrifices people in the name of Kalpanchami. In the next scene we see Christine getting a phone call from her abusive dad who wants to meet with her in order to save their relationship which Christine rejects. Christine gets tensed which causes her to get a sharp headache and holds her head and eventually hangs up the call. Next morning she heads to work where in her on field work she deals with an abusive alcoholic father who beat up his daughter. Christine loses her calm and lashes out on the man and is separated by rest of her crew. The following day Christine's boss tells the crew to travel to Ruku to cover the rural lifestyle which will be Christine's final mission with the crew so the boss throws a small party as a farewell. There we see Christine and her crew consisting of Shreya, Maya and her boyfriend Roger, Smriti and B.K. their boss introduces them to an alleged Murderer Ram as their guide to which the crew are very skeptic.

Maya and her boyfriend get into constant fights as Maya thinks her boyfriend is cheating on her. A day later the crew leaves for Ruku. They reach a small village where they see a shaman trying to treat a boy allegedly possessed. This scene causes Shreya to panic and faint and she wakes up in a tent. The crew moves along towards their destination and B.K. buys some magic mushrooms on the way and gives them to all the members of the crew and the crew starts hallucinating dead bodies and jungle men along the way they lose track of their destination. They end up in a small village called Zhirgana and see a small house where they find a small mute boy and his grandfather. The old man offers the crew to stay at his place till the morning.

The crew enjoys their stay by singing and dancing in a bonfire, Christine is recording the video of the entire celebration when she sees Roger and Smriti making out. Everyone goes to sleep afterwards and next morning Shreya wakes up and goes by the lake to find Smriti's dead body floating in the water. The old man is quick to judge that this is the work of Kalpanchami. All of the crew members are in a state of panic and Maya eventually finds an underwear in Roger's pockets. Shreya identifies the underwear is of Smriti and Christine blames Roger for killing smriti by showing them the video she captured.

The crew holds Roger hostage and calls the police. Maya is in deep love with Roger and cannot accept that it was Roger who killed Smriti. She goes to meet Roger but an unidentified person slits Maya's throat with a sickle and dumps her body near the lake. When the crew finds Maya's dead body they let Roger out. Meanwhile, Shreya finds and enters the old man's room which is covered in pools of blood and severed goat heads. Everyone thinks its the old man and they plan to head out of the place but suddenly someone impales B.K with an axe. To everyone's horror its the old man but to everyone's surprise he demands to tell who killed his grandson, the old man is about kill Ram but Christine saves him by impaling the old man with a knife. Believing they killed the murderer Ram, Roger, Shreya and Christine focus on treating B.K who is barely alive at the moment. Roger and Ram go to collect medical supplies from their van and firewood. Roger when he is collecting firewood sees the dead body of the grandchild which means the actual killer is still on the loose.

Roger hurries towards the rest of the crew only to find out Shreya is murdered and Christine is impaled and is barely alive. He tries to revive Christine and She blames Ram for all of the murders. Roger in a fit of rage attacks despite Ram pleading his innocence. Eventually both get into a fight and kill each other.

The next morning the police arrives and sees Christine is the only one alive. Then we get a flashback of Christine's past. As a child Christine was physically abused by her father and after her mother died her dad eventually married another woman. From all this trauma Christine developed a disease called dissociative identity disorder. She possessed four personalities Christine, Kristy Chris and Christopher. Christine is the normal, self isolated girl suffering from trauma. Kristy is the confident extrovert who handles Christine's social life. Chris is her protector and helps Christine to deal with situations that would make her panic. All these three alter egos coexist well and Christine switches personalities by the medium of sharp and short headaches but Christopher is quite violent. With therapy Christopher was dormant all these years but the call from her dad in the beginning resurfaced Christine's fourth personality.

She then went on a killing spree first killing Smriti as she was having an affair with her friend's boyfriend. Then Maya as she was constantly accepting the abuse by her boyfriend Roger and then Shreya to which Christopher beloved had made Christine weak. After killing Shreya, Christopher also stabs Christine. After being rescued by the police Christine is seen besides the lake reminiscing about all the events that happened last night.

== Cast ==
Hanna Geschewski: Zhigrana is Hanna's first feature and debut film. She is of a German background. She is fluent in Nepali and has also sung one song in the movie. She plays Christine, an American living in Nepal in an NGO called Sano Paila for the past four years who can speak fluently in Nepali. She is the head team leader and she will be going back in after her last mission.

Shanti Giri Shanti Giri is a theater actor. She has played in movies such as Fitkiri, Ahdyaya etc. She plays Shreeya, a role of a team doctor for the NGO Sano Paila. Her character is the best friend of Hanna's and has sister Smriti working for the same NGO. She is very superstitious and protective of her sister.

Jyoti Karki: This is Jyoti Karki's first movie in a leading role. He plays Ram, a Guide that takes the responsibility of taking the NGO team to the mission and back. He had just been released from prison for the alleged murder of his wife's love partner.

Nikun Shrestha: Nikun Shrestha is a well-known Club DJ in Kathmandu, Nepal. He got his first break in the movie "Chadke" the most revenue grossing movie in a single weekend in the history of Nepali Cinema. Nikun plays Roger, half Spanish and half Nepali, who is a videographer by profession and takes all the footages for the NGO. He is also in relationship with another character Maya but also has a side relationship with another character Smriti.

Menuka Pradhan: Menuka Pradhan is a theater actor. She has played in movies like Visa Girl, Ek Din Ek Raat, and Vigilante etc. She is known for the hit song Jaalma from the movie Resham Filili. Menuka plays Maya, who takes all interviews of people, data of the villages they visit. Maya is also in love with Roger despite his unfaithfulness in the past. Menuka was nominated for best supporting actress for NEFTA awards 2015.

Deewakar Piya: Dewaaker plays BK, the most comedic role in the movie. His character doesn't take anything seriously and plays as the coordinator of the NGO team.

Bina Pandey: Bina is a Make-up Artist by profession. She plays a character of Smriti who plays a nurse in the NGO. She is also Shreeyas sister and in sexual relationship with Roger.

Arun Regmi: Arun Regmi is the most veteran actor in this movie. He has played a lot of movies in the past and is also a production Manager by profession. Arun plays Baaje, a grandpa who lives in the village of Zhigrana with his grandson in the past. His character is also an exorcist who makes sacrifices for spirits to go away.

== Production ==
Production began October 2013. The cast and crew went to shoot for 32 working days. The movie was shot in Rupa Lake close to Pokhara, the highway to Pokhara and Kathmandu. The set of village Zhigrana built in Rupa lake was one of the biggest sets built in Nepali film Industry. The art director "Prakaash Chandwadkar" was nominated for best Art Direction in NEFTA awards 2015. The Post Production went on for about a year. The entire sound of movie was done in a very well-known studio in Bombay called the Mukta Arts Studio.

== Release ==
Zhigrana was released on March 6, 2015. It was very well received by the viewers and the critics. It brought new audience to the Nepali film Industry and after watching the movie viewers saying Nepalese movies are getting better and reaching new heights with good original stories.

== Controversy ==
The Censor Board of Nepal removed an intimate scene between Roger and Maya from the movie. Even after this, the movie was given an A rating. The production company, Golden Yak Entertainment, protested the A rating when all the adult scenes had been removed. Later, Golden Yak released the intimate scene on YouTube.

== Awards and nominations ==
Zhigrana won two National Awards out of seven for best cinematography and best editing. Zhigrana also won best screenplay from NEFTA awards.

- Pasang Lama (Nominated for Best Debut Director 2015 NEFTA awards)
- Pasang Lama (Winner of Best Screenplay 2015 NEFTA awards)
- Iman Shah (Nominated for Best Background score NEFTA awards)
- Shailendra D. Karki (Winner Best cinematography National award 2015)
- Nimesh Shrestha (Winner Best Editing National Award 2015)
- Horror Hotel Film Festival, Ohio, USA. (2nd Place in best Foreign Film 2016)

== Soundtrack ==
- Nachana by Pasang Lama
- Pratibimba by Sanyog shahi
- Matra dui Paisa ko by Nischal Gurung
- Zhigrana by Hanna Gechewski
- Kalo Raat by Mokshya
- Jeewan Ek Choti by Nishcal Gurung
