= Namrata Shrestha =

Nepalese actress and model

- नम्रता
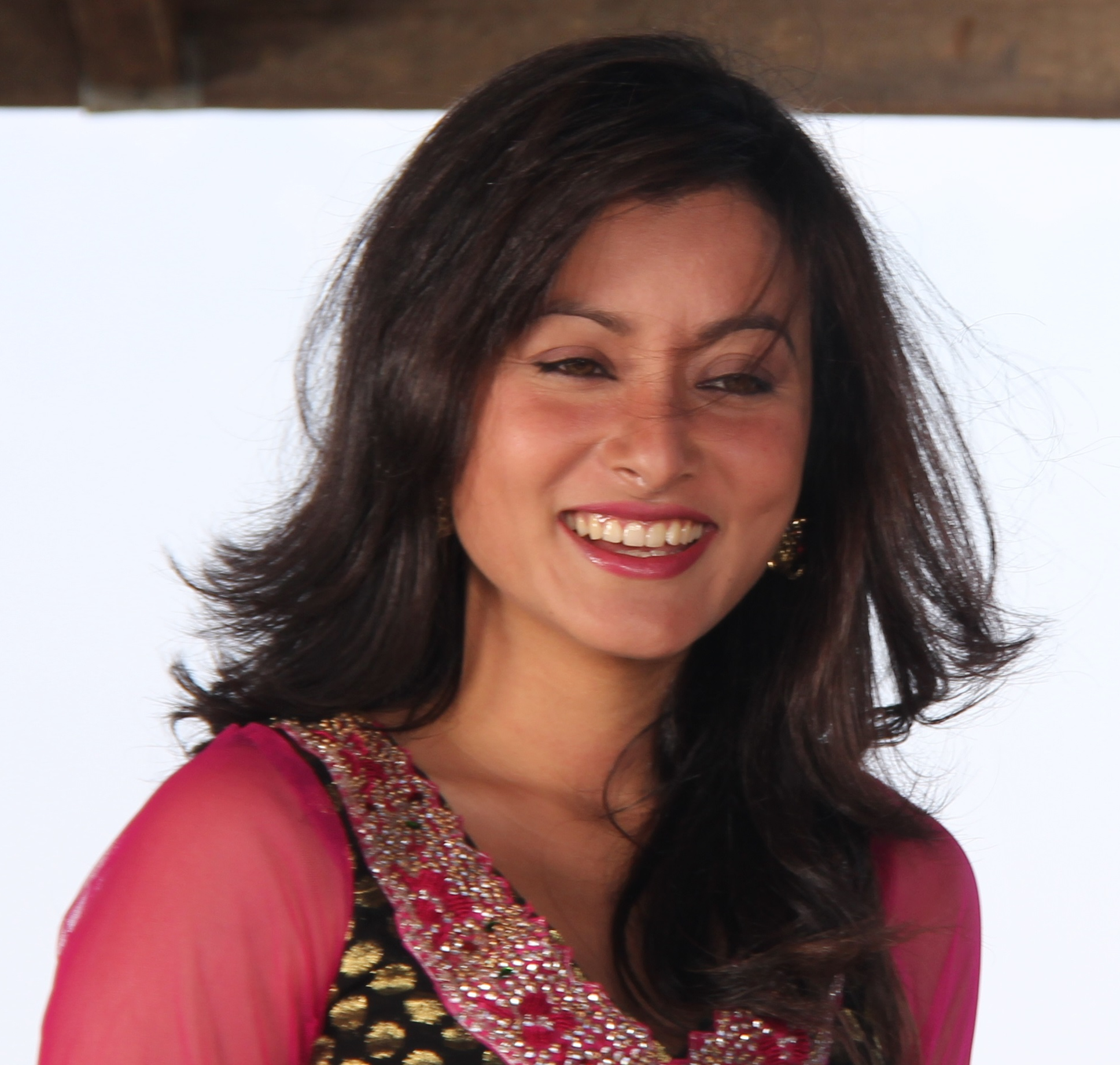
- Namrata Shrestha in 2013
- Occupations: Actress, film maker
- Years active: 2005 – present
- Website: namrataashrestha.com

Namrata Shrestha is a Nepalese actress and model. Since debuting in Alok Nembang's Sano Sansar in 2008, Shrestha has gone on to appear in a number of commercial Nepali-language films as a sought-after model and actor.

== Career ==
In 2008, Shrestha appeared alongside Karma in the romantic comedy Sano Sansar, where she played the character of Ritu. Shrestha was new to acting and was selected for the role despite her lack of experience.

Shrestha then appeared as Sikha in the 2009 romantic comedy Mero Euta Saathi Chha.

In 2010, Shrestha debuted in her first theater performance, Jalpari.

Since then, Shrestha has appeared in a string of high-profile films, including the Nigam Shrestha-helmed Chhadke alongside Saugat Malla, Dayahang Rai and Robin Tamang; Maun where she plays a mute woman.

In 2015, Shrestha starred in the film Soul Sister, playing two characters. The film also marked her debut as a singer for the song 'Bistarai Bistarai'. The following year, in 2016, Shrestha starred in the movie Classic, again alongside Aryan Sigdel. Her role in the film earned her a Dcine Award for Best Actor in a Leading Role (Female) and the National Film Award for Best Actress.

Shrestha then starred in the movie Prasad to widespread critical acclaim. Shrestha once again won the Dcine Award for Best Actor in a Leading Role (Female) for her portrayal of Narayani in the film.

In 2019, Shrestha starred in the action movie Xira, where she did all of her own stunts and shaved off her hair. The film was not well-received with the Kathmandu Post summing up "Xira the film won’t let you admire Xira the character"

== Personal life ==
Namrata Shrestha was born in Dharan on 14 June 1985.

== Filmography ==
Year	Film	Role	Notes
2008	Sano Sansar	Reetu	
2009	Mero Euta Saathi Cha	Shika	
2010	First Love	Guest Appearance	
2010	HIV Aids Awareness		Short film
2012	Miss U	Jasmine	
2013	Chhadke	Soli	
2013	Maun	Barsha	
2014	Megha	Megha	
2014	November Rain	Sheetal	
2014	Tandav	Maya	
2015	Soul Sister	Maya	
2015	Adhakatti	Namrata	Special appearance in song "Hey Namrata"
2016	Classic	Dristi	
2016	Homework	Anshu Raymajhi	
2016	Sambhodhan	Parol	
2017	Parva	Reetu	
2018	Prasad	Narayani	
2019	Xira	Xira	

== Theatre appearances ==
Year	Film	Role	Notes
2009	Jalpari	Jalpari	Based on the play Lady From the Sea
2011	Oleanna	Carol	
2014	Yerma	Yerma	
2017	Golden Boy	Lorna Moon	

== Awards and nominations ==
Year	Awards	Category	Work	Result
2014	INFA Awards (Hong Kong)	Best Actor (female) 2014	Maun	Won
2015	NEFTA awards 2015	Best Actress	November Rain	Nominated
2015	NEFTA awards	Popular Actress of the year	November Rain	Nominated
2016	FAAN Awards	Best Actress	Classic	Won
2016	Dcine awards	Best Actress	Classic	Won
2016	NFDC Award 2016	Best actress	Classic	Won
2016	LG Film Awards	Best actress	Classic	Won
2019	Dcine awards	Best Actress	Prasad	Won
2019	4th Global Nepali Film Award	Star of the Year (Female)	Prasad	Won
