= Jharana Bajracharya =

Nepalese film actress

- Born: Jharana Bajracharya Rashid; Kathmandu, Nepal
- Education: Siddhartha Vanasthali Institute; Sociology (Degree)
- Occupations: Actress, model
- Years active: 1997–2013
- Known for: Miss Nepal (1997)
- Spouse: Rahul Agrawal (m. 2015)
- Children: 1
- Parents: Lalana Bajracharya (mother); Rashid (father)

Jharana Bajracharya (Nepalese: झरना बज्राचार्य) is a Nepalese actress and beauty pageant titleholder. She was crowned Miss Nepal 1997.

== Early life ==
Jharana Bajracharya Rashid was born in Kathmandu, Nepal to a Hindu mother, Lalana Bajracharya, who holds a degree in psychology, and a Muslim father, Rashid. Jharana completed her schooling from Siddhartha Vanasthali Institute. She is also a painter and potter and holds a degree in sociology.

== Career ==
Jharana started her journey in the Nepali entertainment field after being crowned Miss Nepal in 1997 at the age of 16 and represented Nepal in the Miss World contest held at Baie Lazare, Seychelles on November 22, 1997. Jharana made her acting debut in Hatiyar playing second fiddle to the leading lady Karishma Manandhar, co-starring opposite Rajesh Hamal.

After starring in Pareni Maya Jalaima which won the best story award at the Nepali Film Awards, Jharana promptly made her way into Mumbai to find her place in Bollywood. She appeared in Hindi film Love in Nepal and many other advertisements. After she could not make a niche in Bollywood, she returned to Nepal. She has appeared in many music videos as well. Her last Nepali film was Kohi Mero which was released in mid 2010. Jharana appeared at the Fem Botanica KTV film awards in October 2008 where she performed with Alok Nembang on several songs.

== Brand ambassador ==
Jharana appeared as the Nepalese brand ambassador for Lux soap in 2003.

== Personal life ==
Jharana married Rahul Agarwal, a Nepali film producer of Malaysian Hindu background, in March 2015. She settled in Kuala Lumpur, Malaysia, post-marriage. The couple had a son, Ishaan, in April 2016.

== Music video appearances ==
- 2006: "Priye Timi" by Bijay Adhikari.
- 2006: "Tapowan" by Jagdish.
- 2007: "Dubna Deu" by Anil Singh.
- 2007: "Tum Sang Remix" (Hindi Song).
- 2007: "Binti Cha Hai" by Prakash Gurung (Gurung Song).
- 2004: "Dubna Deu Malai" by Anil Singh.
- 2010: "Laija Re" by Hemanta Rana
- 2012: "Manda Manda" by Manu Limbu
- 2013: "Panchhi" by The Outsiders
- 2013: "Bachunjelilai" by Ram Krishna Dhakal and Lata Mangeskar
- 2013: "Aaja Pani Timrai" by Yateesh M. Acharya and Maya Roka Pradhan

== Filmography ==
Year	Title	Language	Role
1997	Hatiyar	Nepali	
1998	Bhuttukai Bhaye Ni	Nepali	Jharana
2001	Siudo Ko Sindoor	Nepali	Dwiti
2002	Anjuli	Nepali	
2002	Bhai Tika	Nepali	
2003	Maya Garchu Ma	Nepali	
2003	Chahanchu Ma Timilai	Nepali	
2004	Love in Nepal	Hindi	Tanya
2004	Parenni Maya Jalaima	Nepali	
2004	Sanjeevani	Nepali	Sanjeevani
2005	Pheri Arko Saino	Nepali	
2010	Kohi Mero	Nepali	Divya

Awards and achievements
Preceded by —	Miss Nepal World; 1997	Succeeded by Jyoti Pradhan (Nepal)
