= Dipak Sharma =

Nepalese music director (born 1985)

Dipak Sharma दिपक शर्मा
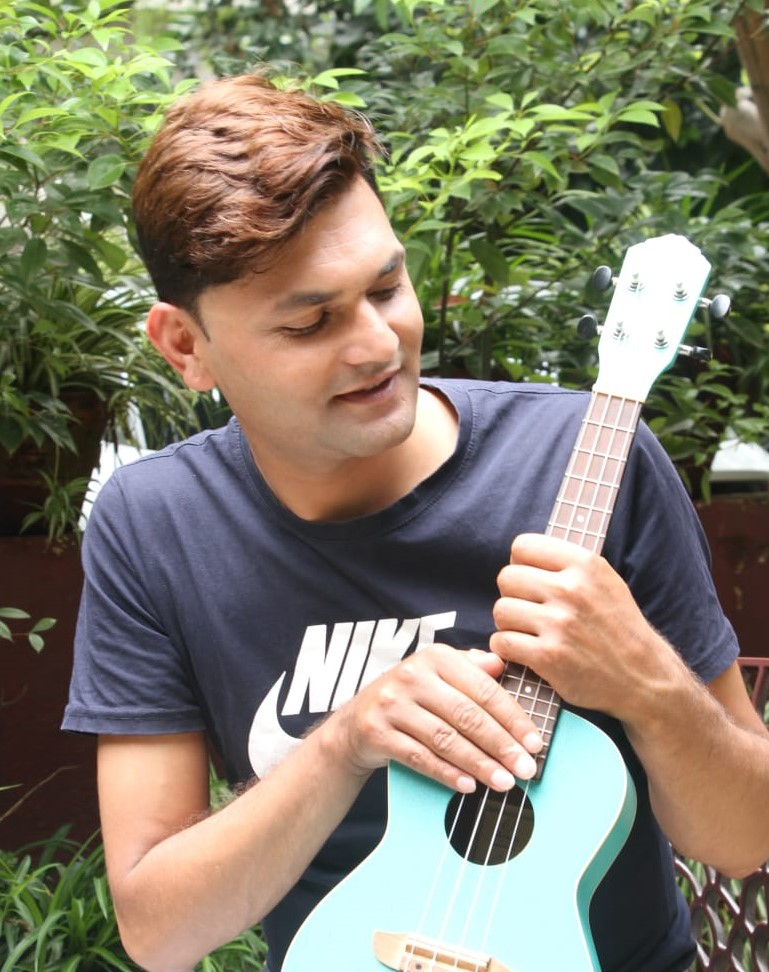

Background information
- Born: September 6, 1985 (age 40); Myagdi, Nepal
- Origin: Nepal
- Genres: Nepali modern songs/folk Songs/filmy Song/Pop Song and more..
- Occupation: Music Director of Nepal
- Years active: 2061(B.S)–present

Dipak Sharma (Nepali: दिपक शर्मा ) is a Nepali music director and composer. He has composed more than a thousand songs and has received several awards. He has been honored by various organizations and the Nepal Government, including the Janasewa Shree Padak, which was bestowed upon him by the President of Nepal, Ramchandra Paudel.

== Career, early life and biography ==
Sharma was born on 1985.He began composing in 2061 BS (2004-2005 AD). He has given melodies on above a thousand songs of modern, folk, pop, folkpop, Rock, Teej and filmy songs. He started his musical career composing folk-tune on a folk song "Dhalke Pipal". Some of his publishes songs are Malai Aafno banayara dukhi banchhau bhane, Jindakiko sawaal hunchha, Adhikhola Urlier, Pirim Lagaune, Timra Dola Dola haatama, Timro picture hit, Parkha parkha mayalu, Dekha na champa, and Maile laune Jhumke bulaki, performed by a child singer. He received a Tika gopal song award in 2079 BS.

He received his earliest music education from music teachers Narhari Premi from Shruti Sangeet Vidyalaya.Sharma is a Lifetime member of the Nepal Music Association in Kathmandu. This membership has been given on the occasion of World Music Day, Honors and awards program 2079 B.S. Sharma has contributed to a dozen Nepali films. Mangalam, Chakkapanja, Chakkapanja-3, Chakka Panja 4 Hijo Ajaka Kura, Hawaldar Suntali, Kismat-2, which are noted as commercially success films among all.. Sharma has been certified for his work as a music composer on the film Love You Baba, a Guinness World Record holder film. Sharma has played a decisive role(Jury Member) by being associated with various organizations, like Chaya Chhabi Teej Award 2078, Annapurna Global Festa, Spiny Babbler award, Genius Music Award 2079 and Nepal Music & fashion Award 2079.

== Personal life ==
The musician Deepak Sharma was born in Myagdi, Nepal in 2042BS. In 2059BS, he completed his SLC (School Leaving Certificate) and came to Kathmandu in 2060BS. While working in a hotel, he started his journey in the film-music industry. He received music education from Guru Narahari Premi. He has composed music for dozens of Nepali movies., He started his professional career as a composer with the film Tejaab, but gained his first award for the Nepali movie song Aandhi Khola Urliera.

== Album ==
SN	Album name	Published Date(BS)	Number of Song	Songs Gener	Ref
1	Karod Club Filmy Song	2080	6	Filmy	
2	Gantebya	2066	6	Lok Pop	
3	Saransa	2068	8	Modern	
4	bekasur	2068	6	Gajal	
5	Ukali Orali	2074	6	Modern	
6	Karod Club	2080	11		

== Songs ==
=== Movie songs ===
Songs Name	Movie	Reference
Parkha Parkha Mayalu	Mangalam	
Dekhana Champa	Chakka Panja	
Philo Number ma	Chakka panja 3	Chhakka Panja 3
Love You Baba	Love You Baba	
Maya Jadau	Hijo aaja ka kura	
Picture Hit	Kismat 2	
Timro Dola Dola	Hawaldar Suntali	
Chpak Chipak	Raja Rani	
Chi Musi Chi	Hawaldar Suntali	
Gham Juna Chaidaina	Love Station	
Jadau Maya Jadau	Hijo Aaja Kaa kuraa	
Adhi khola Urliyara	Samji Rakha Hai	
Hera Jor Mahina	Prakash	
Phakaunai Janina	December Falls	
Darshan Salam	Chakka Panja 4	
Bihe Bhako chhaina	Chakka Panja 5	
Aakhai Rasilo	Yo Man Ta Mero nepali Ho	
Satidevi		
Green Cardaima	Pheri Resam Philili	
Tyo Mitho Joban	Magne Raja	
Rimai	Rimai	

=== General songs ===
Songs Name	Song Type	Reference
Pirim Nalaune	Modern Song	
Malai Aafno Banayara	Slow Modern	
Pardaina pardaina	Love Song	
Chhaina Malai Pir	Lok Pop	
Herana Kanchhi	Lok Pop	
Jindagi kai sawal hunchha	Slow Modern Song	
Kura Katne ManchheLe	Modern Song	
Chhutiyara Timi Sanga	Slow Modern Song	
Pachhi Pachhi Lagera	Lok Pop Song	
Timro Boli	Modern Song	
Halleko saag	Lok Song	
Muna Timi Ghar Jau	Song	
Kunai Din	Modern Song	
Sunaulo Tara		
Balakhaima Dil Basyo	Folk Song	
yeHai Maya	Lok Pop	
Arko Juni Khai Kunni	Lok Pop	
Ful Fuleko ban	Lok Pop	
Okkal Dokkal 2	Lok Pop	
Nilo Kurtale	Lok Pop	
Galbandi Pachheuri	Lok Pop	
Silki Kapal	Lok Pop	
Dadai Pipal		
Jiskera Maskera		
Maiti ko Ghau		
Timra mata ji		
Manko Tirsana	Modern Song	
Chaine Kere Laure Ta	Teej Song	
Phulko Basana Sari	Police Song	
Jyanmaya	Itam Song	
Lukaune Thau chhaina	Pop Modern	
Kathmandu ma	Cultural Song	
Dharti Mathi Jun	Lok dohori	
Bhandeu Dharti Mai	Lok Song	
Manko Tirsana	Lok Song	
Asti Bhanda	Lok Song	
Chukul	Lok Song	
Bhetai Nahune	Lok Pop	
Aafusita Aafai Danga	Lok Pop	
Phool Phulyo	Lok pop	
Maya Ho Maya	Lok Pop	
Dukha Sunayara K Kaam	Modern	
Bhetdina Rati Ratima	Lokpop	
Anta Nasare	Lok Dohari	
Bamari Basayo	Teej Song	
A chelibeti	Teej Song	
Machhi Bhulyo	Lok Pop	
Kindine Ho Kalle	Teej Song	
Chainan Piyari	Lok Pop	
Aayo re Aayo Teej	Teej Song	

== Awards ==
S.N	Date(B.S)	Awards Title	Awards Category	Ref
1	2069	Filimy Khabar Digital Film Awards	Best Music Director (Movie)	
2	2073	5th Rastrya Rapti Music Awards	Best Music Director (Movie)	
3	2074	9th D Cine Award	Best Music Director (Movie)	won
4	2074	Kalika FM Music Award	Best Music Director(Chhaka Panja)	
5	2075	Kalika FM Music Award	Best Music Director (Movie)	
6	2076	Kalika FM Music Award	Best Music Composer Modern Song	
7	2075	Bindabasina Music Award	Best Music Director (Movie)	
8	2019	INAS Award	Best Music Director (Movie)	
9	2015	Music Khabar Music Award	Best Music Composer POP Song	
10	2017	Music Khabar Music Award	Best Music Director (Movie)	
11	2019	Music Khabar Music Award	Best Music Director (Movie)	
12	2078	Quality Entertainment Award	Best Music Composer Modern Song	
13	2078	Birat Music Award	Best Music Composer Modern Song	
14	2078	Sagarmatha Music Award	Best Music Director (Movie)	
15	2076	NIM Award	Best Music Director (Movie)	
16	2076	Young Mind Award	Best Music Director (Movie)	
17	2079	Cine Circle Award	Best Music Director (Movie)	
18	2080	Captivating Creation Award 2023	Music Composer	
19	2080	2nd Jibanda Nepal music Award	Best Movie Award	
20	2081	12th Nepal Africa Film Festival International Award	Best Movie Song Composer	
21	2082	Music Khabar Teej Music Award - 2025	Best Teej Song Original Music	

== Honors ==
SN	Title	Ref
1	Dhaulagiri Yuwa samman -2022	
2	Pim Nepal honors -2022	
3	Dhaulagiri Sangit Utsab-2079(BS)	
4	Government of Nepal Jansevashree Padak	
5	NatiKaji Rastrya Samman -2078(BS)	
6	Milap Rastrya Samman-2079(BS)	
7	Yuwa Sangitkar Samman- 2079(BS)	
8	Yuwa Partiva samman	
9	JanasewaShree Padak (President Ramchandra Paudel)	
10	Music Khabar's 7th anniversary and creator and journalist honor	
11	5th Nepal Music & Fashion Award - 2025	
12	Ambassador For Peace (Universal Peace Federation)	
13	4th Spiny Babbler International Film Festival (2024)	
14	EBG Sixth National Personality and Creator Award-2081	

== Organization involvement ==
SN	Organization Name	designation	ref
1	National Folk Cultural Association, Nepal	Vice President (2080 -02 to present)	
2	National Creator & Performer Academy	General Secretary(2080 - 2082 BS) Senior Vice President (2082 - Present)	
3	Music Video Directors Guild Of Nepal	Honorable Member	
4	Film Artist Worker's Organization of Nepal (FAWON)	Honorable Member	
5	Music Composer Association Nepal	Secretary/ Lifetime Member	
6	Myagdi Artist Association, Nepal	Vice President	
7	Music Association of Nepal	Lifetime Member	
8	Music Royalty Collection Society Nepal	Member	
9	Lyricist Association of Nepal	Member	
10	Performers Society of Nepal	Member	

== Judge ==
SN	Organization Name	Organizer	ref
1	Music Khabar Music Award 2021	Music Khabar	
2	Genius Music Award 2078	Genius Music	
3	Nepal Music and Fashain Award 2022	Star One Entertainment	
4	DSA Star 2024	Grand Finale	
