= A Millionaire's First Love =

- Theatrical poster
- Hangul: 백만장자의 첫사랑
- Hanja: 百萬長者의 첫사랑
- RR: Baengmanjangjaui cheotsarang
- MR: Paengmanjangjaŭi ch'ŏssarang
- Directed by: Kim Tae-kyun
- Written by: Kim Eun-sook
- Produced by: Lee Joo-ick
- Starring: Hyun Bin; Lee Yeon-hee
- Cinematography: Choi Chan-min
- Edited by: Ko Im-pyo
- Music by: Kim Tae-seong
- Production company: Boram Film Company
- Distributed by: Lotte Entertainment
- Release date: 9 February 2006
- Running time: 116 minutes
- Country: South Korea
- Language: Korean

A Millionaire's First Love (Korean: 백만장자의 첫사랑; RR: Baengmanjangjaui cheotsarang) is a 2006 South Korean romantic film directed by Kim Tae-kyun, starring Hyun Bin and Lee Yeon-hee. The theme of the film is "Nothing is more important than the true love of your heart." It was released in South Korean cinemas on 9 February 2006, and recorded 639,596 admissions during its run.

== Plot ==
Kang Jae-kyung (Hyun Bin) is a typical rich kid. He is arrogant, drives sporty cars, frequents the big clubs and rides through school corridors on his motorcycle. As his 18th birthday approaches, he is set to inherit his grandfather's fortune, but first Jae-kyung is required to transfer to a new school in Gangwon Province and graduate. Until then all access to his penthouse, cottage and credit cards is denied. Should he fail to graduate or drops out, he would loses everything. If he wishes to give up, he will only receive 0.1% of his overall inheritance. With this in mind, he heads out to the countryside, to a small town where daily life is far removed from what he is used to.

== Cast ==
- Hyun Bin as Kang Jae-kyung
- Lee Yeon-hee as Choi Eun-hwan
- Yong-Joon Cho as Goo-Ho
- Do-hyeon Lee
- Han-sol Lee as Myungshik
- Lim Ju-hwan as Seung-joon
- Hak-yeong Ye
- Kim Ki-doo as Pyung-Chang's classmate 3

== Soundtrack ==
1. Prologue
2. Insa (Farewell) – Jaejoong from TVXQ
3. 거친 나의 나날들
4. Gray Noise – Yeongene
5. 기억을 따라가는 재경 (Memories Follow Jae-kyung)
6. 털양말 (Feather Socks)
7. 피리부는 소녀 (Flute Girl)
8. Dialogue 1
9. 우리 은환이 좀 살려주세요 (Please Let Eun-hwan Live)
10. Dialogue 2
11. Kiss
12. 이제 너 많이 힘들어 지겠다 (It Will Be Really Hard for You Now)
13. Dialogue 3
14. 들판을 거닐며
15. Insa (Inst.)
16. Dialogue 4
17. Insa – Lee Yeon-hee
18. Dialogue 5
19. 첫눈 (First Snow)
20. Insa – TVXQ
21. Dialogue 6

== International release ==
Distribution rights to Japan were purchased by Digital Adventure for US$1,500,000.

== Remake ==
It inspired the Nepali film Mero Euta Saathi Chha (2009), the Turkish film Senden Bana Kalan and the Telugu film Pilla Zamindar (2011). All remakes were hits at the box office in their respective countries.
