= Mero Euta Saathi Chha =

2009 Nepalese film

Mero Euta Sathi Chha
- Promotional poster of Mero Euta Saathi Chha
- Directed by: Sudarshan Thapa
- Written by: Subash Basnet
- Produced by: Prabhu SJB Rana
- Starring: Namrata Shrestha; Aaryan Sigdel; Jiwan Luitel; Dayahang Rai; Zenisha Moktan; Sushma Karki; Rekha Thapa
- Music by: Sugam Pokharal; Bipin Acharya
- Production company: Eyecore Films
- Release date: 2009
- Running time: 161 minutes
- Country: Nepal
- Language: Nepali
- Budget: est. रू1 crore

Mero Euta Saathi Chha (Nepali: मेरो एउटा साथी छ; English: I Have One Special Friend) is a 2009 Nepali film. It is an unofficial remake of the Korean film A Millionaire's First Love. The film was a box-office success.

== Plot ==
The story begins with the remembrance of childhood friend Jay of Shikha. Shikha is the daughter of the principal of a high school. The high school building is situated in property of Jay's family. Lawyer Bikram Thapa warns the principal to pay the rent or leave the property where a resort would be established. Shikha moves to Jay's town to seek help from him.

Jay, who is the heir to the property, is raised by his grandparents after the death of his parents. Being a rich guy, he abuses his wealth. One day, he skips class and while riding on his bike, he gets challenged from another bike rider in black helmet. He gets ahead of him and blocks his way. He acknowledges that the black helmet person was chased by Nepal Police for crime of robbery.

Shikha meets Jay incidentally and nearly meets an accident. They quarrel, and he gets away. Later on, Shikha goes to Jay's Hotel, but Jay refuses to meet her. Shikha returns to her home then. Jay gets expelled from the college due to his habits. Lawyer reminds him he could only get the property in his name only after he graduates from high school within the next year. Otherwise, 99% of the property will be donated to charity under ownership of lawyer and only 1% in his name.

To finish his high school, he goes to the village where he spent his childhood. He joins the high school there and meets Shikha, who is the monitor of the class as well the instructor of the charity play for collection of funds for the rent to save the high school grounds. Jay, getting sick of the village life, tries to get away from there. But slowly he starts to like the culture and lifestyle of the village. Later, he falls in love with Shikha and starts to help to collect the funds without knowing that the property is his own.

One day new person appears in college named Ragav who was the rider in black helmet on the day of robbery. He robbed the bank to pay off the loans of college but was caught due to Jay. He hurts Jay but soon he realizes his mistake. Shikha being a heart patient, starts get heart pains. During the charity play Shikha goes to sleep forever in Jay's arm.

Lawyer tells he want Jay to be good person, so he had sent him to the village. Jay builds foster home for the children and rest of his life he gives up in memory of childhood friend and his love Shikha.

== Cast ==
- Aaryan Sigdel as Jay Shumsher JBR
- Namrata Shrestha as Shikha
- Jiwan Luitel as Ragav
- Ashok Sharma as Lawyer Bikram Thapa
- Keshab Bhattarai as Shikha's father
- Zenisha Moktan
- Sushma Karki
- Dayahang Rai as funny college student
- Bikash Nirola as a fan
- Rekha Thapa in a cameo

== Release ==
The film was released on 11 September 2009. After a year of production, the movie did not follow the queue system. With that provision, it did not get the screening dates at the Bishwa Jyoti Cinema and Ganga Hall but was screened at other cinema halls of both Kathmandu and outside.

== Critical response ==
Although, the film met with some criticism for the story resembling to the Korean movie A Millionaire's First Love, it received positive reviews for its direction, cinematography, choreography and mostly for Aaryan Sigdel's performance.

Aaryan Sigdel won the National Film Award for the Best Actor in Leading Role for his performance. Sound designer and mixer Uttam Neupane won the National Award for his work in this film.

== Box office ==
Mero Euta Saathi Chha collected approximately 2.15 Crore all around Nepal and overseas.

== Music ==
Mero Euta Sathi Chha

Soundtrack album by Sugam Pokharel
- Genre: Feature film soundtrack
- Producer: Bikash Nirola

=== Tracks ===
The official track listing.

No.	Title	Artist(s)	Length
1.	"K Yo Maya Ho"	Sugam Pokharel	3:51
2.	"Juni Juni"	Sugam Pokharel, Rejina Rimal	4:51
3.	"Lajai Lajai"	Soham, Mandira	3:38
4.	"Mero Aankha ko Gajal"	Sunidhi Chauhan	3:49
5.	"Mero Euta Saathi Chha"	Sugam Pokhrel	3:20

== See also ==
- A Millionaire's First Love
