= Pareni Maya Jalaima =

Babu Rao
- Directed by: Prithvi Rana Magar; Ramsharan Ghimire
- Produced by: Hitman Gurung
- Starring: Jharana Bajracharya; Dilip Rayamajhi; Uttam Pradhan; Prithvi Rana Magar; Sunil Thapa; Mithila Sharma; Laxmi Giri; Hritika Gurung
- Cinematography: Gavin Liew
- Edited by: Shiva Puri
- Music by: Sachin Sing
- Release date: 20 May 2004
- Running time: 2 hours 15 minutes
- Country: Nepal
- Language: Nepali

Pareni Maya Jalaima, or Pare Ni Maya Jalaima (Nepali alternative transliteration) or Undone by Love (English-language title), is a 2004 movie filmed 80% in Hong Kong with the remaining footage shot in Nepal. It was nominated for the categories of best story, best screenplay, and best cinematography at the 2005 National Film Festival, winning the best screenplay award for writer-director Prithvi Rana Magar. It is the most expensive film ever made in the history of Nepalese cinema with a production cost of about 18 million rupees. It was shot on 35-millimeter film—a rarity for Nepalese movies—by Hong Kong cinematographer Gavin Liew. Because of a long and exhausting legal battle between the investors, the film's release was delayed for three years. By the time it hit theaters, the charm of the highly anticipated movie had vanished. Although people who watched the movie liked and appreciated it, it was not successful at the box office because of poor marketing and excessive use of the English language, which Nepalese audiences are not accustomed to. The movie only made around 30% of its investment. It grossed around 12 lakhs in Nepal and 10 lakhs internationally against its budget of 1 crore 80 lakhs.

== Cast ==
- Dilip Rayamajhi as Himal
- Uttam Pradhan as Suraj
- Drishya Mishra as Naina
- Jharana Bajracharya as Kiran
- Mitthila Sharma
- Sunil Thapa
- Prithvi Rana Magar
- Laxmi Giri
- Hritika Gurung

== Plot ==
Man Bahadur is an ex-Gurkha soldier living in Hong Kong with his family. He has a son named Himal, a nephew Suraj —whom he has looked after since childhood—and his wife. Himal and Suraj are of the same age and are close. However, there is a great difference in their personalities. Himal's thinking is Westernized and has friends of poor character. Himal uses drugs occasionally and is dating a girl named Jenny from the Philippines. He spends most of his time in discos, rather than with his family or at work. On the other hand, Suraj has a good work ethic and, unlike Himal, likes Nepalese music, food., and culture. Man Bahadur and his wife are concerned about Himal's future: Man Bahadur fears their son has escaped their influence, while his wife has not lost hope yet. She thinks if Himal marries a Nepalese girl, everything will be all right.

One day in a disco, Himal gets drunk and, not knowing what he is doing, kisses a girl against her will. A fight breaks out between Himal and the girl's boyfriend, and Himal is badly beaten up. Man Bahadur's worst fears are becoming real now. However, his wife is still optimistic and insists on finding a Nepalese girl for him. Man Bahadur resists at first, but eventually gives up to his wife's pressure and agrees to write to his childhood friend Bal Bahadur for his daughter Kiran's hand in marriage for Himal. Man proposes that Bal send his daughter to Hong Kong as a tourist; during her stay in Hong Kong, if Himal and Kiran like each other, only then will their parents announce the marriage. Bal is delighted, thinking Himal is the perfect groom for his daughter and hoping she can escape hardship in Nepal. After consulting his wife, Bal sends Kiran to Hong Kong, telling her that it is their gift for her college vacation.

Kiran arrives in Hong Kong, and meets Himal and Suraj; during her stay with the family she gets to know them and finds herself gradually falling in love with Suraj. Himal, on the other hand, is happy with his girlfriend Jenny, drinking and using drugs. Due to absenteeism at work, he is fired from his job, refuses to get another one, and runs through his savings; this drives Jenny to leave him. Himal incurs a serious head injury in a fight with Jenny's new boyfriend and his friends. While in the hospital after surgery, he realizes the error of his ways and vows to turn over a new leaf. Out of gratitude to Man Bahadur and his family, Kiran visits Himal in the hospital and takes care of him. After spending times with Kiran, Himal finds her attractive and slowly starts liking her, but he doesn't know that she is already in love with Suraj.

Man Bahadur and his wife see that Himal and Kiran like each other; thinking Kiran is responsible for Himal's rehabilitation. they announce their engagement at a party, which stuns Suraj and Kiran. Kiran leaves the party; Suraj follows her and, after a long talk, convinces Kiran to marry Himal to keep the family together. What happens next? Better leave it here as what happens next is astonishing.
