= Saigrace Pokharel =

Nepalese storyteller

- साइग्रेस पोखरेल
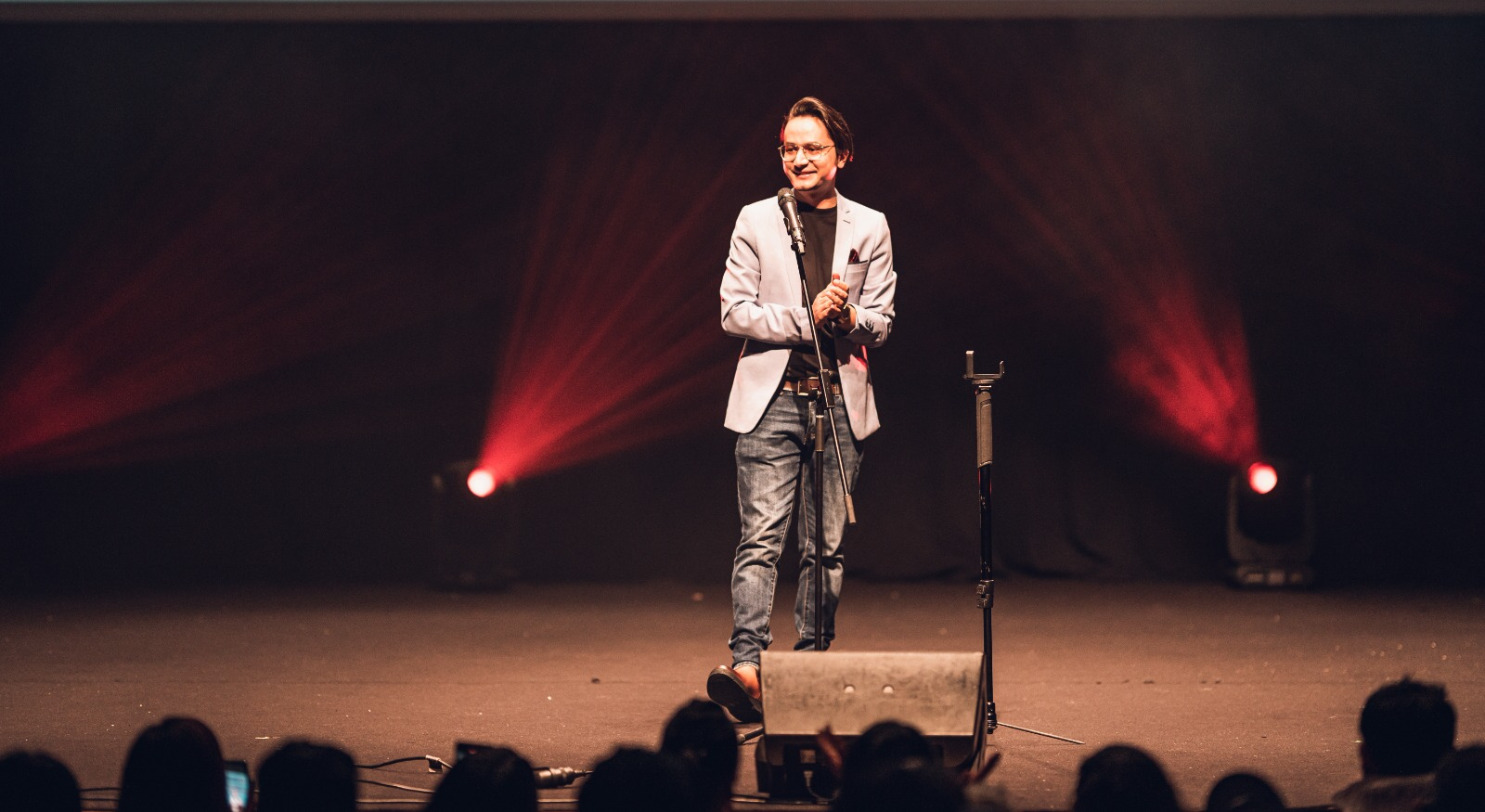
- Born: Santosh Pokharel; 7 November 1987 (age 38); Kathmandu, Nepal
- Occupations: Storyteller, Film maker, Video producer
- Spouse: Sarita Adhikari (Srita)
- Website: http://saigrace.es/

Santosh Pokharel better known as Saigrace Pokharel (Nepali: साइग्रेस पोखरेल; born 07 Nov 1987). is a Nepalese storyteller, film maker and video producer.

== Early life and education ==
Pokharel was born in Dhading and raised in Kathmandu. He started his primary education in Kathmandu. He completed his Post Graduation on Strategy Management from Demort Fort University, Denmark.

== Career ==
Pokharel formally performed as a storyteller for the first time in 2012 on one of the event organized by sri satya sai sewa sangathan Nepal. In November 2021, Pokharel did an event called Word Tour with Saigrace in seven cities of Nepal: Dhangadhi, Jhapa, Dharan, Chitwan, Butwal, Pokhara and Kathmandu. Subsequently he performed in various places in Nepal and abroad.

== Filmography ==
Key
†	Denotes films that have not yet been released

Year	Film	Role	Notes	Ref(s)
2025	Jerry on Top	Creative writer		
2026	Aa Bata Aama	Ram	Debut as an actor	
