= Neeta Dhungana =

Nepalese actress (born 1991)

- Born: 16 September 1991 (age 35)
- Occupation: Actress
- Spouse: Harihar Adhikari (2022)

Neeta Dhungana (Nepali: नीता ढुङ्गाना, born 16 September 1991) is a Nepalese actress. Neeta has been working in Nepali film industry since teenager. She has played as an elder sister in Ajambari Nata which was released in 2008. Due to her acting and dance along with Nepali actor Jiwan Luitel in her popular Nepali film Notebook, she is popularly known "Gala Ratai Girl (English: Red Cheeks Girl)" which was shot in Ilam, Nepal.

== Personal life ==
Dhungana is married to popular Nepali astrologer Harihar Adhikari.

== Filmography ==
Key
†	Denotes films that have not yet been released

Year	Movie	Role	Language	Note
2008	Ajambary Nata		Nepali	Nepali Debut
2011	Masaan		Nepali	
2011	Dharane Keta (Clip)		Nepali	
2011	Hamro Maya Juni Juni Lai		Nepali	
2013	Dabbab		Nepali	
2013	Notebook		Nepali	
2014	Cha Ekan Cha		Nepali	
2015	Bhool Bhulaiyaa		Nepali	
2016	Fulai Fulko Mausam Timilai		Nepali	
2017	Nirvay		Nepali	
2017	Panchayat		Nepali	
2018	The Karma		Nepali	
2019	Kadke Kamal Ke		Nepali	
2019	Sher-E-Hindustan	Sweaty	Bhojpuri	Bhojpuri Debut
2024	Hraswo Deergha	Narayani	Nepali & Hindi	Debut as producer
2025	Maahi		Bhojpuri & Hindi	
2026	Parvati		Nepali	

== Awards ==
Year	Award	Category	Film	Result	Ref(s)
2021	National Navdurga Award	None		Honoured	
