= Prakash (film) =

2022 Nepalese film directed by Dinesh Raut

- Nepali: प्रकाश
- Directed by: Dinesh Raut
- Written by: Bikash Subedi
- Produced by: Mahendra Adhikari
- Starring: Pradeep Khadka; Deeya Maskey
- Cinematography: Rajesh Shrestha
- Edited by: Jeevan Thapa
- Music by: Tara Prakash Limbu; Alish Karki; Dipak Sharma; Subash Bhusal Production Sound, Sound Design, Mix: Uttam Neupane
- Distributed by: RR Films
- Release date: 26 August 2022
- Country: Nepal
- Language: Nepali
- Budget: रू2.5 crore (US$160,000)
- Box office: रू1.75 crore (US$110,000)

Prakash (Nepali: प्रकाश; transl. The Light) is a 2022 Nepali film directed by Dinesh Raut under the banner of Binish Entertainment Pvt. Ltd. The film was released on August 26, 2022. The story is based on the life of a man from rural Nepal who dreams of becoming a school teacher. Entire filming was done in Jumla. The film stars Pradeep Khadka, Deeya Maskey, and Renu Yogi, who made her debut through this film. Prakash was made on a budget of around 2.5 crore Nepalese rupees, which makes it one of the most expensive Nepali films.

The film was released simultaneously in eight countries, including India, Australia, New Zealand, Japan, the United States, Canada, parts of Europe, and parts of the Middle East. Distribution rights for these countries were sold for ₹1.72 crore.

== Synopsis ==
Prakash, played by Pradeep Khadka is an aspiring youth of Jumla, a rural district of Nepal who is preparing to become a teacher. He is survived by a widowed mother played by Dia Maskey supporting him to complete his academic qualification. However, due to his poor family background, he faces various struggles in his journey.

== Cast ==
- Pradeep Khadka as Prakash
- Deeya Maskey as Sita (Prakash's mom)
- Renu Yogi
- Prakash Ghimire
- Rajan Khatiwoda
- Amjad Prawej
- Dev Kumar Shrestha
- Hum B.C
- Prasant Shrestha
- Govinda Sunar

== Production ==
- Dinesh Raut - Director
- Mahendra Adhikari - Producer
- Bikash Subedi - Writer
- Rajesh Shrestha - Cinematographer
- Aashika Sharma - Production Designer
- Jeevan Thapa - Editor
- Tara Prakash Limbu - Music composer
- Alish Karki - Music composer
- Dipak Sharma - Music composer
- Subash Bhusal - Music composer

== Soundtrack ==
No.	Title	Lyrics	Music	Singer(s)	Length
1.	"Manchhe Manchhe"	Ashok Sherchan	Alish Karki	Satya Raj Acharya	5:21
2.	"Jor Maina"	Dipak Sharma	Dipak Sharma	Dhurba Bisco	5:06
Total length:					10:26

== Reception ==
=== Box office ===
According to the Film Development Board, Prakash grossed approximately 1.75 crore in Nepal.

=== Critical reception ===
Nasana Bajracharya from Online Khabar rated the film 4 out of 5 stars. She praised Pradeep Khadka for his acting skills and ability to justify his character. She stated "Prakash is a refreshing film experience for the Nepali audience. It ditches a lot of the overused tropes and lets the scene, the character and the chemistry between them grow organically."

== Accolades ==
Year	Awards	Category	Nominee	Result	Ref(s)
2023	6th Nepal International Film Festival	Best Actor (Male)	Pradeep Khadka	Won	
2023	6th Nepal International Film Festival	Best Actor (Female)	Deeya Maskey	Won	
2023	6th Nepal International Film Festival	Best Cinematographer	Rajesh Shrestha	Won	
