= Nai Nabhannu La =

Nepalese romantic drama film

- नाई नभन्नु ल
- Directed by: Bikash Raj Acharya
- Screenplay by: Bikash Raj Acharya; Pradip Dahal; Arundev Joshi
- Story by: Bikash Raj Acharya
- Produced by: Dinesh Kumar Pokharel
- Starring: Jiwan Luitel; Suman Singh; Mithila Sharma
- Cinematography: Purusotamp Pradhan
- Edited by: Dirgha Khadka
- Music by: Mahesh Khadka
- Release date: 20 August 2010
- Running time: 143 minutes
- Country: Nepal
- Language: Nepali
- Box office: est.रू3 crore

Nai Nabhannu La (transl. Don't say no) is a Nepalese romantic drama film written and directed by Bikas Raj Acharya. The film stars Jiwan Luitel, Richa Singh Thakuri, and Suman Singh in lead roles along with Mithila Sharma, Mukesh Acharya, and Hemangh Budhathoki in supporting roles. The film was released on 20 August 2010 with a mixed response from critics but a positive response from the audience. The film was a huge commercial success, leading Jiwan Luitel to stardom. There were four sequels to the movies, all of which were commercial successes and are the second highest-grossing franchise in Nepal after Chhaka Panja(franchise). Nai Nabhannu La earned 3 crore across the country. This film is also one of the highest-grossing Nepali films of 2010 in Nepal.

== Cast ==
- Jiwan Luitel as Shishir
- Suman Singh as Basanta
- Richa Singh Thakuri as Ritu
- Mithila Sharma as Ritu's Mother
- Mukesh Acharya
- Hemanta Budhathoki as Doctor

== Soundtrack ==
| No. | Title | Singer(s) | Length |
|---|---|---|---|
| 1. | "Aau Na Aau" | Deepak Limbu, Rajina Rimal | 4:15 |
| 2. | "Ma Marne Bela" | Rajina Rimal | 4:40 |
| 3. | "Mohani Ma Haraye" | Deepak Limbu, Rajina Rimal | 4:38 |
| 5. | "Nai Nabhannu La (Title Track)" | Deepak Limbu, Rajina Rimal | 5:24 |
| Total length: | | | 18:57 |

== Nai Nabhannu La Series ==
- Nai Nabhannu La (Released on 20 Aug 2010)(li)
- Nai Nabhannu La 2 (Released on 11 Apr 2014) (li)
- Nai Nabhannu La 3 (Released on 10 Apr 2015) (li)
- Nai Nabhannu La 4 (Released on 8 Apr 2016)
- Nai Nabhannu La 5 (Released on 24 Aug 2018) (li)
- Nai Nabhannu La 6 (Nepali: नाइ नभन्नु ल ६ ) ( 2023)
