= Pushkar Lal Shrestha =

Nepalese journalist (1959–2019)

- Born: 4 August 1959
- Died: 15 April 2019 (aged 60)
- Citizenship: Nepal
- Occupations: Writer, journalist
- Spouse: Rajeswori Shrestha (m. 1959)
- Children: Direk Lal Shrestha; Rakin Lal Shrestha; Anuj Lal Shrestha
- Parent(s): Bharat Lal Shrestha (Father); Mrs. Jamuna Devi Shrestha (Mother)
- Writing career
- Language: Nepali

Pushkar Lal Shrestha (4 August 1959 – 15 April 2019) was a Nepali journalist and the founder of Kamana Prakashan Samuha, publisher of a local daily newspaper Nepal Samacharpatra and a monthly cinema magazine Kamana. He held the position of editor-in-chief at the newspaper.

== Publications ==
- Kalam (Auto biography)
- Yatra Bideshko Chinta Swadeshko
- Nepal Kina Banena

== Awards ==
- Gorkha Dakshin Bahu (1999)
- Tri Shakti Patta
- His Majesty's Accession to throne Silver Jubilee Award (1997)
- Birendra Aiswarya Sewa Padak (2002)
- National Personalities Award (2002)
- Press Council Award
- Honored by Reporter's Club for the outstanding Contribution in the Professional Journalism in Nepal (2002)
- Rastriya Gaurav Yuba Samman (1998)
- Abhiyan Shree (1998)
- Nepal Motion Picture Award (1999)
- Dabur Film Journalism Life Achievement Award (2003)
- Sadhana Samman (1999)
- New year Award (1998) Honored by Nhundan Sirpa Samitee
- Honored by Sayapatri Films Pvt.Ltd. for the outstanding contribution in the Nepali Film Industry.
- Abhiyan Special Award (1996)
- Great Musician Natikaji Samman
- Gold Medal, Inter Corporation Football competition (1980)
- Silver Medal, National League Football Tournament (1981)
- Reyukai Samman (2006) & many more
- Several Sports awards in Football n Badminton

== Death ==
He succumbed to Guillain-Barré syndrome on April 17, 2019, at the age of 60.
