= November Rain (2014 film) =

2014 Nepali romantic drama film

- Poster
- Directed by: Dinesh Raut
- Written by: Chhetan Gurung
- Produced by: Aaryan Sigdel; Subash Giri
- Starring: Aaryan Sigdel; Namrata Shrestha; Chulthim Dolma
- Cinematography: Rajesh Singh
- Edited by: Surendra Paudel; Akki Sharma (VFX)
- Music by: Tara Prakash Limbu
- Release date: 14 April 2014
- Country: Nepal
- Language: Nepali

November Rain is a 2014 Nepali-language romantic drama film directed by Dinesh Raut and produced by Aaryan Sigdel and Sunil Giri, and it is written by Chhetan Gurung. The movie is about the love story of Aayush (Aaryan Sigdel) and Sheetal (Namrata Shrestha), but the story takes a dramatic turn when it is revealed that the heart of Aayush was illegally transferred by the doctor to Sheetal's son to allow them to survive. Dalli (Chultim Gurung) is in unrequitedly in love with Aayush. It was released in 2014 worldwide with positive reviews from critics, with praise aimed towards performances, direction, and story, but some critics criticized its runtime. Although the film had an average box-office opening, positive word of mouth from audiences helped the movie to register one of the highest collections at the Nepalese box office. The movie eventually became a huge commercial success. The film is now considered one of the best romantic movies ever made in Nepal.

== Plot ==
Sheetal was a heart patient from birth. In order to save her and keep her last wish of life, Dr. Sharma (Sheetal's Dad) played by Amitesh Shah, illegally swaps the heart of Sheetal with Aayush who was born the same day claiming Aayush dead to his real parents. However, a nurse adopts Aayush and raises him in Dharan. After the death of the nurse, Aayush finds out that she is not his real mother and travels all the way to Kathmandu to find Dr. Sharma and know the truth.

Dalli, the one-sided lover of Aayush, follows him to Kathmandu where she assists Aayush in helping his real parents who were living in hard times and were in debt. Helping his real parents from their financial difficulty, Aayush figures out that his life is soon going to end.

Sheetal and Aayush who had fallen for each other (unknown of their prior history). Once Aayush find out about the truth, he ignores Sheetal in every possible way. However, Sheetal can't get rid of her feelings and later, when she figures out the actual reason Aayush was ignoring her, Aayush is already approaching towards death.

Aayush's leaves a huge pain for both Sheetal and Dalli and whenever it rains, they lose themselves in the rain in memory of their beloved Aayush.

== Cast ==
- Aryan Sigdel as Aayush
- Namrata Shrestha as Sheetal
- Chhulthim Dolma Gurung as Dalli
- Amitesh Shah as Dr. Sharma

== Critical response ==
November Rain earned about 20 lakhs from its opening day. The gross tolled to 65 lakhs in just two days. November Rain was critically acclaimed by the public. November Rain received positive reviews and went on to gross more than 2 crore.
