= Jiwan Luitel =

Nepalese actor and model (born 1981)

- Born: Jiwan Luitel; 10 September 1981 (age 44); Sundar Haraicha Municipality, Morang, Nepal
- Occupations: Actor, model
- Years active: 2002–present
- Known for: Mr. Nepal
- Website: www.jiwanluitel.com

Jiwan Luitel (Nepali: जीवन लुइटेल; born 10 September 1981) is a Nepalese actor and beauty pageant titleholder who won Mr. Nepal 2002.

His first film was Tirkha. He has worked in more than 65 Nepali films till this date. He achieved the award of KTV Best Debutant Actor for his film Nasib Aafno in 2010 and also awarded as Best Actor in NFDC National Film Award (2069) for Maliti Ko Bhatti in 2013.

== Personal life ==
Luitel was born on 10 September 1981 in Morang. A fashion model, in 2002, he became Mr. Nepal and subsequently began his acting career in the Nepalese Film Industry (Kollywood). Luitel participated in the Sydney Fashion Show in 2009, the same year he was badly injured doing a stunt for a film.

== Filmography ==
Year	Title	Role
2007	Tirkha	
2007	Ghatak	
2008	Sano Sansar	
2009	Mero Euta Saathi Chha	
2009	Kasam Hajurko	
2009	Naseeb Aafno	
2010	Deep Sikha	
2011	Nai Nabhannu La	
2011	Ma Timro Bhaisake	
2011	Malai Man Paryo	
2012	Malati Ko Bhatti	
2012	Jaba Jaba Maya Bascha	
2012	Andaz	
2012	Blackmail	
2013	Rhythm	
2013	Notebook (2013 Nepali film)	
2013	Mero Man Ko Sathi	
2013	My Brother	
2013	Bindash 2	
2014	Nai Nabhannu La 2	
2014	Shisa	
2014	Jau Hina Pokhara	
2014	Sukulgunda	
2014	Thuli	
2014	Dhoon	
2014	Stupid Mann	
2015	Bhool Bhulaiya	
2016	Kafal Pakyo	
2016	Refugee	
2016	Baazigar	
2016	Subba Saab	
2016	Radha	
2017	Lake Side	

== Awards ==
Year	Award	Category	Work	Result	Ref(s)
2013	Dcine Award	Best Actor in a Leading Role (Male)	Notebook	Won	
