= Romi Wani Ghimire =

Nepali actress

Romi Ghimire (Romi Wani Ghimire) is a Nepalese actress and model. She started her career as a media personal. For a couple of years, she hosted the cultural show named 'Hamro Nepal' produced by NTV PLUS. Later on, she joined Image Channel to host 'Pratibha Dabu' a dance reality show. Then, she appeared in some popular Nepali TV serials; Thorai Vaye Pugisari, Harke Hawaldar and Kilo Tango Mike. She was awarded with best co-actress in FAAN National Award for her visually impaired role in her debut movie Classic.
