= Manu Limbu =

- Born: 16 March 1984 (age 41)
- Occupation: Singer

Manu Limbu (born 16 March 1984) is a Nepali singer known for performing modern and folk songs. She has been active since the early 2000s and has received national music awards in Nepal.

== Career ==
Limbu has recorded numerous modern and folk songs in Nepali over an eighteen-year career, including the albums Mand Mand and Mohini and popular tracks such as “Manda Manda” and “Timro Muskan.” Additional details about her discography can be found in interviews and Nepali-language music publications.

Her songs include Kadam Kadam, Reshmi Rumal, and Chasok Dhangnaam-Limbu Song. She also appears in music videos: Mand Mand, Timro Muskan, and Pare Kaso Hola.
