= Valeriy Sharapov =

Valeriy Sharapov is a Habil. doctor (doctor of engineering sciences), professor, head of department of computer-assisted and informative technologies in the instrument-making of the Cherkassy State Technological University.

He graduated from Chemical Technological College at Shostkа (explosives production) in 1962, from a branch of Moscow Engineering and Physical Institute (MEPHI) in 1969 (automatics and electronics of nuclear facilities).

He received PhD degree (candidate’s degree) at Tomsk Institute of Automatics, Electronics and Control Systems. He received Doctorate degree at Odesa National Polytechnic University (Ukraine).

He worked at the nuclear center in Russian Federation, scientific and industrial complex of “Photopribor”, research institute of “Chimanalyt” and the scientific production association “Phonon”

He is the author of more than 900 scientific publications, inclusive 19 monographs and manuals and more than 500 patents for inventions.

== Publications ==
1. Sharapov V. Piezoceramic sensors. – Springer Verlag, 2011. – 498 p. According to WorldCat, the book is held in 241 libraries
2. Sharapov V.M. et al. Piezoelectric sensors. - Moscow: Technosphera, 2006.- 632p.
3. Sharapov V.M. et al. Sensors. - Moscow: Technosphera, 2012. - 616 p.
4. Sharapov V.M. Baybakov F.B. Control of admixtures in compressed gases. - Moscow: Chemistry, 1989. – 160 p.
5. Sharapov V.M. et al. Piezoceramic transducers of physical sizes.- Cherkasy: ChGTU, 2005.– 631p.
6. Sharapov V.M. et al. Automatic control theory. Manual. Cherkasy: CHSTU, 2005. - 200 p.
7. Sharapov V.M. et al. Piezoceramic transformers and sensors. – Cherkasy: Vertical, 2010. – 278 p.
8. Sharapov V.M. et al. Capacitive sensors. – Cherkasy: Brama-Ukraine, 2010.–184p.
9. Sharapov V.M., Sotula Zh.V., Kunitskaya L.G. Piezoelectric electroacoustic transducers. – Cherkasy: Vertical, 2012.-255p.
10. Sharapov V.M., Sharapova E.V. Universal technologies of management. Moscow: Technosphera, 2006. - 496 p.
11. Sharapov V.M. et al. Piezoelectric transducers. The handbook. - Cherkasy: ChGTU, 2004. – 435 p.
12. Sharapov V.M. et al. Programmed logic controllers in the automatic control systems: the manual. -2-е The edition. – Stavropol: АGRUS, 2010. – 128p.
13. Sharapov V.M., Sharapova E.V. Technologies of management: Practical management. – Cherkasy: ChGTU, 2005.- 563p.
14. Sharapov V.M. and others. Technologies of instrument-making.–Cherkasy: Brama, 2009.–320p.
15. Sharapov V.M., Sheinov V.P. Technologies of projects management. - Cherkasy: Vertical, 2010. – 520 p.
16. Sharapov v.M. et al. Programmed logic controllers in the automated control systems. - Stavropol: АGRUS, 2013. – 128р.
17. Sharapov V., Sotula Zh., Kunitskaya L. Piezoelectric Electroacoustic Transducers. – Springer Verlag. Heidelberg, Dordrecht, London, New York, 2013. – 240 p. ISBN 9781873082096
18. Sharapov V.М., Minaev I.G., Sotula Zh.V., Kunitskaya L.G. Electroacoustic Transducers. – Moscow: Technosphera, 2013. - 280 p.
