= Koshish Chhetri =

Koshish Chhetri कोशिस क्षेत्री
- Born: 13 July 1989 (age 37); Hetauda Nepal
- Occupations: Actor, Singer, Composer
- Years active: 2012 AD to Present

Koshish Chhetri (Parajuli) (Nepali: कोशिस क्षेत्री) is a Nepalese singer, composer. He was born in Hetauda, Nepal, on July 13, 1989. He started his singing career in 2012 AD. He is known for Daiba Ko Rish, Gorkhali, and Sani Nani Nepali songs.

== About ==
Chhetri started his singing career with the song "Daiba Ko Rish." He has worked on numerous songs as a composer, singer, and actor. Some of the notable music videos in his career include "Sharap," "Jaba Timi," and "Sustari." Additionally, he has contributed to various movies as an actor, singer, or across different genres of song. Notable films in his singing career include "A Mero Hajur 3," "Parastree," and "Classic". He was awarded the Global International Award in 2019. He is starting his directing career with the movie "Biroad".

== Awards ==
SN	Award Title	Award Category	Notable Work	Result	Ref
1	FICSON( Film Critics Society of Nepal) -2014	Best Actor	Mokshya	Won	
2	2nd Galaxy Excellence Award - 2023	The Best Versatile Actor Nepal 2023		Won	
3	Nepali Art Culture and Music Award 2077(BS)	Critics Awards for National Feelings Songs	Gorkhali	Won	

== Songs ==
SN	Song name	Release date	Credit	Ref
1	Mayale nai ho piyari	2021AD	Music Composer	
2	Karke Nazar	2017AD	Music Composer	
3	Laltin Balera		Music Composer	
4	Saani Nani	2022AD	lyrics music model	
5	Bhakaari	2022AD	Music Composer	

== Movie songs ==
SN	Song name	Movie name	Credit	Ref
1	Kale Ktale	Aaicho Paicho	Model	
2	Aaja Man	Jubeli	Music	
3	Photo Khichera	Maya Pirim	Music/Model	
4	Barsidai Chha Aashu Yo	A Mero Hajur 3	Music	
5	Sukhama Ma, Ranga Chha Kaha	Kaira	Composer	
6	Lakhar Lakhar	December Fall	Composer	
7	Aaja Man	Julebi ko Man	Music	
8	Maya Oya Oya	Bulbul	Music	
9	Mata Pirmma Paryachhu	Garud Puran	Composer	

== Movie ==
SN	Movie name	Credit	ref
1	Rato Galbandi	Lead Actor	
2	K Ghar K Dera	Cameo Role	
3	Parastree	Actor	
3	Maya Prim	Actor	
4	Parva	Actor, Story Writer	
