= Rekha Thapa =

Nepalese actress

Rekha Thapa रेखा थापा
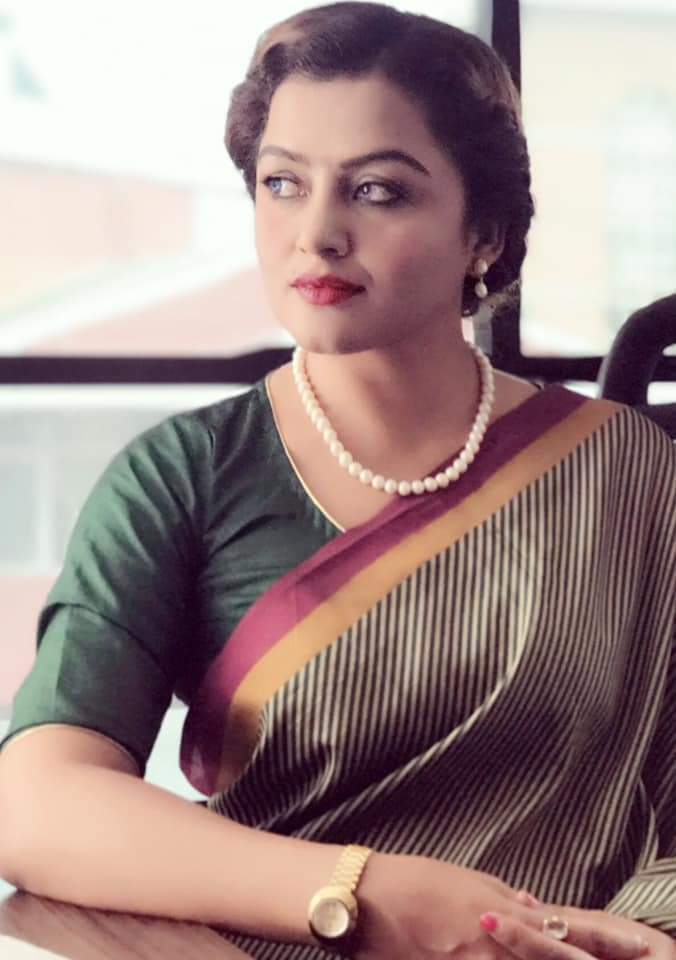
- Born: Salakpur, Morang, Nepal
- Occupation: Actress
- Political party: Rastriya Prajatantra Party
- Spouse: Balram Shahi (m. 2022)
- Awards: CG Digital Film Awards 2010; NEFTA Film Awards 2011

Rekha Thapa (Nepali: रेखा थापा) is a Nepalese actress, politician, filmmaker, and social activist, celebrated for her significant contributions to the Nepali film industry and her unwavering advocacy for women's empowerment. Over her two-decade-long career, she has appeared in over 200 films, many of which spotlight strong female protagonists and address pressing social issues. She won the CG Digital Film Awards for Best Actress, and in 2011 she also won the NEFTA Film Awards for Best Actress.

Among her accolades are two National Film Awards for Best Actress: in 2006 for Himmat and in 2010 for Bato Muni Ko Phool, recognizing her impactful performances and contribution to Nepali cinema.

Thapa is also well-known for speaking out on social and political issues, particularly women's rights. She is recognized for establishing herself in the Nepali cinema business at a time when every film was solely focused on male leads; as a result, she is frequently referred to as a "female hero" rather than a "heroine" of a film.

== Biography ==
Rekha Thapa was born in Salakpur in Morang district of Eastern Nepal. After graduating from school, she moved to Kathmandu for higher studies. As she had a strong desire to be an actress, she continued to participate in various modeling glances & glamorous programs. Later she took part in the Miss Nepal Pageant in 1999 and ended up in Top 10. Thapa adheres to Hinduism.

== Personal life ==
In February 2022, Thapa did a court marriage with Balram Shahi. This was her second marriage; she was married to film producer Chhabiraj Ojha earlier, they divorced in 2012; since then she was living with her mother. Recently, she has given birth to her baby girl.

== In the media ==
Thapa's entry in a top Political Party UCPN (Maoist) amidst a public program at party headquarters office of UCPN (Maoist) in Koteshwor, Kathmandu has been criticized by some of her fans. In November 2009, while protesting for Unified Communist Party of Nepal (Maoist) on supremacy in the government, Rekha Thapa was seen dancing with the Prachanda who encircled Durbar Square, the government headquarter. In December 2009, Rekha Thapa was seen kissing the shortest man in the world, Khagendra Thapa Magar.

Rekha Thapa was on the cover page of Wave Magazine in June 2013.

Rekha Thapa ended her relationship with her husband and film producer Chhabi Raj Ojha in 2012.

Nepali actress and filmmaker Rekha Thapa has returned to direction with the romance film Maya Bhanai Yesto Hola, scheduled for release in late August 2026

== In politics ==
Rekha Thapa spreading precaution measures to take regarding COVID-19 pandemic in Nepal.

In 2013, Thapa joined the Unified Communist Party of Nepal (Maoist). However, a year later, she announced that she was no longer associated with that political party.

Thapa joined Rastriya Prajatantra Party (RPP) on 12 December 2016. In February 2017, Thapa was elected as a central member of RPP. A number of other popular faces, such as singer Komal Oli, and lawmakers Kunti Shahi and Pratibha Rana were also elected.

== Filmography ==
Year	Title	Role	Notes
2000	Hero	Kusum	
2002	Mitini	Pooja	
2003	Jetho Kanchho	Rita	
2004	Jeevan Rekha		Cameo appearance
2004	Hami Tin Bhai	Maiya	
2006	Krodh		
2006	Nari		
2008	Nasib Afno		
2008	Batuli		
2009	Sahara		
2009	Kismat	Kusum	
2010	Bato Muniko Phool	Gurans	
2010	Himmat	Ganga/Jamuna	
2010	Tod		
2011	Kasle Choryo Mero Man	Rajkumari Manabi	CG Digital Film Awards for Best Actress
2011	Hiffajat		NEFTA Film Awards for Best Actress
2011	Khusi		
2011	Hamro Maya Juni Juni Lai		
2011	Kasam Hajur Ko	Shristi	
2012	Saathi Ma Timro	Ashmi	
2012	Ishara		
2012	Andaaj	Pritti	
2012	Lanka		
2012	Rawan		
2012	Jaba Jaba Maya Bascha	Simran	
2013	Mero Jiwan Sathi		
2013	Kali		
2013	Veer		
2014	Himmatwali		
2014	Tathastu		
2016	Rampyaari	Ram/Pyaari	Dual role
2017	Rudrapriya	Lead role	
2020	Hero Returns		

== Awards ==
SN	Award Title	Film Name / Project	Year
1	Best Actress (National Film Award)	Himmat	2006 (2063 BS)
2	Best Actress (National Film Award)	Bato Muni Ko Phool	2010 (2067 BS)
3	Best Actress (CG Digital Film Award)	Kasle Choryo Mero Man	2010
4	Best Actress (NEFTA Film Award)	Kasle Choryo Mero Man	2011
5	Film Person Of The Year (Female)	Filmy Khabar Annual Prize	2011 (2068 BS)
6	Best Actress (Dcine Award)	Hifajat	2011 (2067 BS)
7	Best Actress (Dcine Award)	Lanka	2013 (2070 BS)
8	Best Actor in a Leading Role - Female (INAS Award)	Kali	2014
9	Popular Actor - Female (LG Film Award)	—	2016 (2073 BS)
