= Kamana Film Awards =

Annual film festival in Nepal

CG Lux Kamana Films Awards
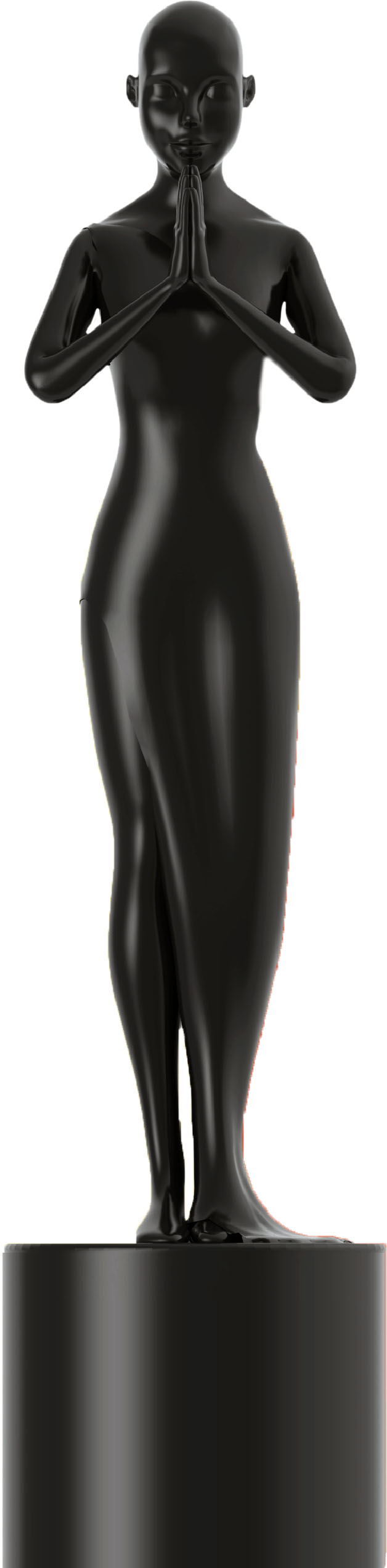
- Country: Nepal
- Presented by: CG International
- Website: https://awards.newsofnepal.com

CG Lux Kamana Film Awards is an award ceremony for Nepali movies organised by Kamana Cine Magazine.

== Kamana Film Awards 2071 ==
Nomination	Film	Name	Ref
Best Film	Mahasush	Mahasush	
Best Director	Mahasush	Nawal Nepal (Mahasush)	
Best Actor (Male)	Mahasush	Aryan Sigdel (Mahasush)	
Best Actor (Female)	Mahasush	Keki Adhikari	
Best Actor (in Negative Role)	Mahasush	Manoj Arasi	
Best Actor in Comedy Role	Producer	Wilson Bikram Rai	
Best Actor in a Supporting Role	Hostel	Gaurab Pahadi	
Best Actress in a Supporting Role	Mahasush	Benisha Hamal	
Best Lyricist	Nai Nabhannu La 2	Gaure Suresh (Marne Kasai Ko Rahar Hudaina)	
Best Playback Singer (Male)	Nai Nabhannu La 2	Prem Pariyar (Marne Kasai Ko Rahar Hudaina)	
Best Playback Singer (Female)	Nai Nabhannu La 2	Rajina Rimal (Marne Kasai Ko Rahar Hudaina)	
Best Child Artist	Nai Nabhannu La 2	Anuvab Regmi	
Best Debut Director	Mokshya	Prabin Shrestha	
Best Choreographer	Kali	Kabiraj Gahatraj (But Slowly Slowly)	
Best Action Direction	Love Forever	Surya Thokar	
Best Debut Actor	Mokshya	Koshis Chhetri	
Best Debut Actress	Hostel	Prakriti Shrestha	
Best Story	Mokshya	Prabin Shrestha	
Best Screenplay	Mahasush	Nawal Nepal	
Best Dialogue	Mokshya	Rajan Kathet and Pragyan Thapa	
Best Cinematography	Hostel	Hari Humagain	
Best Editing	Hostel	Surendra Poudel	
Best Background Music	Mokshya	Sujil Karmacharya	
Best Make Up	Maun	NIma Lama	

== Kamana Film Awards 2076 ==
Nomination	Film	Name	Ref
Best Movie	Prasad	Prasad	
Best Director	Prasad	Dinesh Raut	
Best Actor in a Leading Role (Male)	Prasad	Bipin Karki	
Best Actor in a Leading Role (Female)	Prasad	Namrata Shrestha	
Best Actor in a Supporting Role (Male)	Saili	Dayahang Rai	
Best Actor in a Supporting Role (Female)	Nai Nabhannu La 5	Priyanka Karki	
Best Actor in a Negative Role	Katha Kathmandu	Pramod Agrahari	
Best Actor in a Comic Role	Chhakka Panja 3	Kedar Ghimire	
Best Debut Actor (Male)	Bobby	Umesh Thapa	
Best Debut Actor (Female)	A Mero Hajur 3	Suhana Thapa	
Best Child Artist	Nai Nabhannu La 5	Sedrina Sharma	
Best Debut Director	Damaruko Dandibiyo	Chhetan Gurung	
Best Cinematographer	Nai Nabhannu La 5	Purushottam Pradhan	
Best Editor	Damaruko Dandibiyo	Nimesh Shrestha	
Best Story	Damaruko Dandibiyo	Khagendra Lamichhane	
Best Screenplay	Prasad	Sushil Paudel	
Best Dialogue	Chhakka Panja 3	Deepak Raj Giri, Kedar Ghimire, Jitu Nepal, Yaman Shrestha	
Best Music Director	Nai Nabhannu La 5	Basanta Sapkota	
Best Lyricist	Nai Nabhannu La 5	Dinesh Thapaliya	
Best Playback Singer (Male)	Saili	Hemanta Rana	
Best Playback Singer (Female)	Bandha Mayale	Anju Panta	
Best Choreographer	Chhakka Panja 3[Pahilo Number Ma]	Kabiraj Gahatraj	
Best Action Director	Villain	Sukra Raj Shaha	
Best Sound Mixing	Chhakka Panja 3	Sunaya Man Shrestha	
Best Background Score	Damaruko Dandibiyo	Alish Karki	
Best Makeup	Chakkar	Shyam Lama	
Lifetime Achievement Award	Nir Shah, Santu Tamang		
Jury Award		Hari	
Critics Award		Nhyoo Bajracharya, Shrijana Subba	
Popular Award		Swastima Khadka	

== See also ==
- Pushkar Lal Shrestha, founder
