= Priyanka Karki =

Nepali actress, model, and dancer

- प्रियंका कार्की
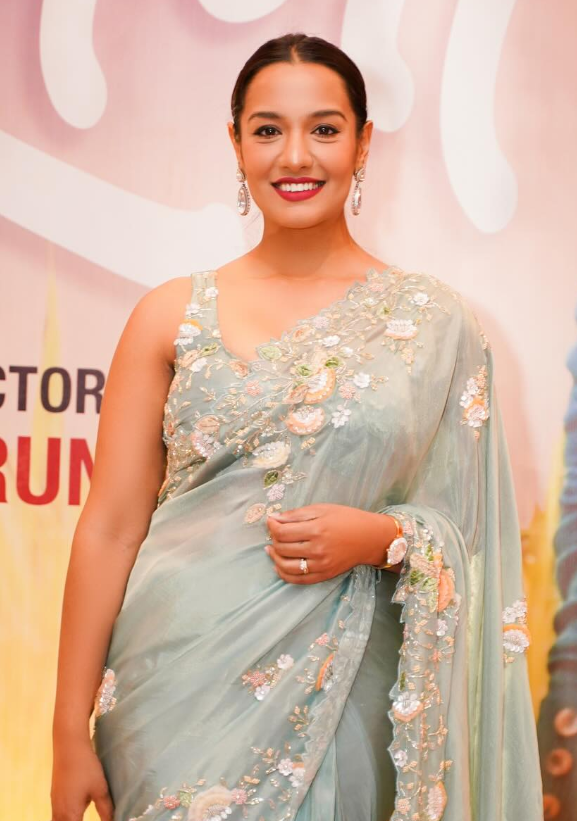
- Karki in 2023
- Born: 27 February 1987 (age 39)
- Education: University of North Alabama
- Occupations: Actress; producer; director
- Years active: 2005–present
- Title: Miss Teen Nepal
- Spouse: Ayushman Joshi (m. 2020)
- Children: 1

Priyanka Karki (Nepali: प्रियंका कार्की; pronounced [priyanka Karki]; born 27 February 1987) is a Nepalese actress, director and producer. The winner of the Miss Teen Nepal pageant, Karki is Nepal's highest-paid actress and has received numerous accolades, including two National Film Awards and five Kamana Film Awards. In 2023, the Government of Nepal honoured her with the Chamber of Commerce for her contribution to the Nepali film industry. She is described in the media as one of the most successful actresses of Nepali cinema.

Karki accepted offers to join the Nepali film industry following her pageant wins. She made her acting debut with the film 3 Lovers (2012), followed by the box-office hits Vigilante 3D (2013), Jholay (2014), Nai Nabhannu La 2 (2014), Punte Parade (2014), Mero Best Friend (2014), all of which went on to establish her career. She received renewed recognition for her performance in the romantic film Suntali (2014), which earned her various of accolades and nomination including National Film Awards and NEFTA Film Awards. The film was also selected at the 19th Busan International Film Festival.

Karki gained further praise for portraying a range of characters in the films Sadanga (2015), Nai na Bhannu la 3 (2015), Woda Number 6 (2015), Kabaddi Kabaddi (2015), Nai Nabhannu La 4 (2016), Chhakka Panja (2016), Purano Dunga (2016), Radhe (2017), Chhakka Panja 2 (2017), Fateko Jutta (2017), most of which were box office successes. Apart from her acting career, Karki has worked as a judge in various of shows. She is also a popular celebrity endorser for various brands and products, has participated in stage shows, and is active in humanitarian work. On Instagram, Karki is one of the most-followed Nepalese woman.

== Early and personal life ==
Karki was born in 1987 in Kathmandu, Nepal. Her parents are Bhupendra Karki and Raksha Malhotra. She did her schooling from Rato Bangla school and pursued her bachelor's degree at the University of North Alabama, she majored in Film and Digital Media Production with a minor in Theatre and graduated summa cum laude. Before entering into the Nepalese film industry, she worked as VJ for Kantipur Television hosting the show Celluloid and The Glam Factor. She then acted in the comedy TV serial Ghar Beti Ba.

Karki was interested in glamour from her early childhood. She participated in a modeling competition. In 2005, she was crowned as Miss Teen Nepal, Nepal's second largest beauty pageant. Describing her pageant win, Karki said, "Winning Miss Teen Nepal 2005 was one of the most exciting and memorable moments of my life. When my name was announced as the winner, I felt overwhelmed with happiness. There were many talented girls competing, so receiving the crown was something I will always cherish. For me, the title was not just a crown or a beauty-pageant achievement; it was an opportunity to discover myself, build confidence and take my first steps into the entertainment industry."

Karki married Rochak Mainali, a resident of Troy, New York. The couple divorced two years later. In February 2020, Karki married her long-time boyfriend, fellow Nepali film actor Ayushman DS Joshi. In September 2021, she gave birth to their first child, Ayanka Karki Joshi.

== Career ==
=== 2012–2015: Career beginnings and breakthrough ===
After winning Miss Teen Nepal, Karki was cast as the female lead in romantic film "3 Lovers" (2012), where she played a double role. The film was applauded by critics. For her performance she was awarded OFA Award for Best Debut Actress. Then Karki's next release was in the year 2013—Kollywood, which underperformed at the box office, though Karki's performance led her to be nominated for the National Film Award. In the same year, she was cast in Dipendra K. Khanal's Vigilante 3D. It is recognized as the first 3D Nepali film but due to technical issues, the film had a limited 3D release. Most of the shooting for the movie was done in locations of Kathmandu and Nuwakot. The movie had a budget of 1 crore out of which 20 lac was for the 3D camera alone. The film received mixed reviews. National Daily Nagarik mentioned that the movie is worth watching, and Himalayan Times noted that the screenplay had some loopholes but the story was presented with intrigue and suspense.

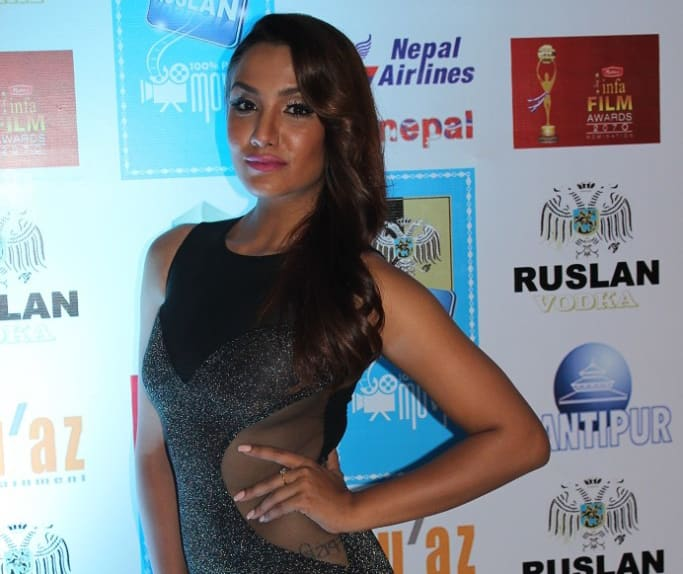
Priyanka Karki at INFA Awards

In 2014, she appeared in the film Jholay, Nai Nabhannu La 2 and Aawaran, all of which were commercially successful. Karki's performances were also applauded by critics for her choices of roles and appreciative of her against-type portrayals. These films earned her various accolades and nominations including Online Filmykhabar Award as Best Actress, NEFTA Award for Best Actor in a supporting role (Female), INFA award for Best Actor in a Supporting Role (Female) and Most Popular Actor (Female). For the film Aawaran, she also sang an alternate version of the song with Yama Buddha. In the same year, she also appeared in the ensemble drama Mero Best Friend, starring alongside Bimlesh Adhikari and Keki Adhikari.

In 2015, she appeared in the film Suntali. It premiered at the 19th Busan International Film Festival in the Window on Asian Cinema category. Abhimanyu Dixit of The Kathmandu Post wrote, "Without ever falling into the clichés of spunky heroine, [Karki] effortlessly embodies that admirable thing: a modern woman. Sophia Pande of Nepali Times wrote, "Suntali is quite the pleasure for those of us who have cringed in the theaters while watching Nepali films in the past". Niranjan Kunwar of The Record wrote "Suntali is a simple, yet beautiful film. And it's the simplest beauty that can be the most powerful". The staff of Online Khabar wrote, "True to its form, Suntali combined these two to a certain degree of success. But the audience couldn't warm up to this as most failed to recognise the clever juxtaposition of these forms". Karki's performance was critically acclaimed for which she won various accolades for Best Actress including Nepal Film Critics Award (NFCA) and the National Film Award. Her next release of the year was the horror thriller film Mala, she starred as the title character in the film, a widow, with long black hair and a white sari who is seen throughout but speaks only one word. The film had the song "Surke Thaili Khai". It went on to become the first Nepali song to reach 20 million views on YouTube. But the film performed poorly at the box office. Further, she appeared in the thriller film Sadanga, starring alongside Sauram Raj Tuladhar and Saugat Malla. Then in the same year, she returned with sequel Nai na Bhannu la 3. Karki's last release of the year was the film Woda Number 6, which was directed by Ujwal Ghimire and she starred alongside Kedar Ghimire, Dayahang Rai and Deepa Shree Niraula.

=== 2016–2019: Established actress ===
In 2016, she first appeared in the film Fanko. Then she appeared comedy film How Funny, directed by Nilu Doma Sherpa. Online Khabar applauded the film. In a video review, Canada Nepal also praised the film. Then she appeared in the sequel Nai Nabhannu La 4. The film met with mixed response from critics but overwhelming response from audience. It also emerged as one of the highest grossing Nepali film. The series of successful films continued with her next project—the comedy drama Chhakka Panja. The film was directed by Deepa Shree Niraula in her directorial debut. The movie's viewership surpassed Hindi films such as Baar Baar Dekho and Freaky Ali. The film even attracted prime ministers KP Oli, Jhalanath Khanal and Madhav Kumar Nepal, comedians Madan Krishna Shrestha and Hari Bansha Acharya. Prime Minister Oli reviewed Chhakka Panja as a good film but criticised its title. Jhalanath Khanal also gave good reviews to the film saying that the film unsettled him with its social satire. The Himalayan Times wrote "Chhakka Panja is a total comedy and social drama, a story of friendship, love and revenge. It is hilarious from start to finish." It emerged as one of the highest grossing Nepali film of all time. Karki's last release of the year was the film Purano Dunga. Which also emerged as commercially successful.

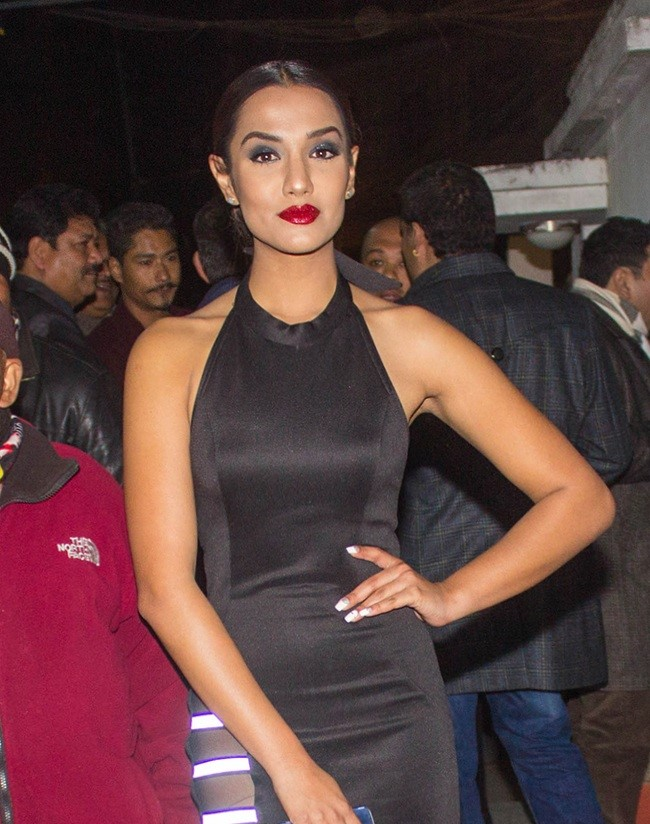
Karki in 2016

In 2017, she first appeared in the film Radhe. The film is about a man named Radhe who loves Priya but one day he leaves the village without anyone's notice then he joins the Nepalese army to fight for his country. The film was one of the successful film that was released that year and was commercially successful at the box office. Further she appeared in the film Laltin. In the same year, she also appeared in the film Chhakka Panja 2. Ekantipur reported that Chhakka Panja 2 earned Rs. 60 million in the six days. The film emerged as the highest-grossing film in Nepal of the year breaking record of Prem Geet 2 within 8 days. Chakka Panja 2 also broke the opening of Baahubali 2 in Nepal and its newest box office estimate was Rs. 13 crore. Her last release of the year was the film Fateko Jutta, opposite Saugat Malla. In 2018, she had nine film releases – four of them — Butterfly (colors of love), Changa Chait, Happy Days and Katha Kathmandu — were critical and commercial failures. Apart from the failure she also had successful releases — Shatu Gatey , Kohalpur Express, Nai Na Bhannu La 5 and Chhakka Panja 3. Her last release of the year was the film Lily Bily.

In 2019, she first appeared in the film Anaagat. Further she appeared in the film Prem Diwas. Her last release of the year was the film Hajar Juni Samma. Sunny Mahat of The Annapurna Express wrote, "Now this is a movie you'd want to watch with your female friends, just to see them cringe at the creepy old man trying to find a match for his son". Abhimanyu Dixit of The Kathmandu Post, wrote "But Chamling's [producer] efforts have been wasted because the delivery is lazy. So is the screenplay and dialogue, written by director Bikash Raj Acharya and Samipya Timilsina". Rupak Risal of Moviemandu wrote that Karki had "done justice to [her] role". In 2020, she appeared in the film Lakka Jawan. The film's cast includes Barsha Siwakoti, Saroj Khanal, and Ansuya Shrestha. The film explores the social consequences of migration in rural Nepal, depicting the declining presence of young people in villages and the resulting burden on older residents. The film also addresses violence against women and highlights the difficulties victims face in obtaining justice. Additionally, it portrays caste discrimination and the practice of untouchability as continuing social issues in Nepal. Rekha Subedi of Moviemandu wrote that Karki had "brought depth to her role", adding that although she appeared in [only] a few scenes, she made an impactful presence on screen.

=== 2020–present: Career fluctuations ===
In 2023, Karki had two film releases, the first of which was the thriller drama Chi Musi Chi, opposite Ayushman Joshi, Benisha Hamal and Reecha Sharma. The film emerged as a box-office bomb. She next starred in the social drama Fulbari. The film shows the story of the poverty and simplicity of a parent who wants to spend a retired life with his wife and children by setting up a fund in the name of his mother in the school to get the money through the savings fund. Other cast members in the film include Bipin Karki, Dayahang Rai, Shilpa Maskey, Gaumaya Gurung, and Anupam Sharma. A review by Prasun Sangroula in Online Khabar praised Fulbari for its emotional portrayal [of] family relationships, particularly the responsibilities of children toward their parents. Sangroula praised the performances, cinematography, background score and depiction of eastern Nepal, while noting similarities between the film's themes and the 2003 Hindi film Baghban. He described the film as a relatable family drama combining emotional and humorous elements. In December 2025, Priyanka Karki launched Nyano Maya Ka Kura, a video podcast focused on parenting and family life.

== Other work ==
=== Singing and stage performances ===
Karki recorded Bachchu Kailash's classic "Timi le ta Hoina" which is a cover song and released a video for it. Karki also collaborated with YouTube performer Nattu Shah and recorded a cover version of Jason Mraz and Colbie Caillat's 'Lucky'. Karki's debut single "Swatantra", which is about freedom, liberation, and independence, was released on 1 January 2016. The single had more than 300,000 views during the first two weeks and it hit a million views in the first two months.

Karki is one of the judges for the first international dancing reality show Boogie Woogie Nepal alongside choreographer Kabiraj Gahatraj and actor Dilip Rayamajhi.

=== Philanthropy ===
Karki supports various causes and charitable organizations. In 2018, Karki launched the Aayanka Foundation and conducted a menstrual hygiene awareness campaign in Dhanusha District, distributing sanitary pads and educating students about reproductive health and menstruation. In 2019, Karki participated in a fundraising event that brought together Nepali celebrities to support social causes and community welfare initiatives. The same year, Karki and her husband Ayushman Joshi, were appointed as members of the Clean Environment Mega Campaign. Their appointment was made through a ministerial-level meeting, and on February 19, the Ministry of Forests and Environment officially confirmed the decision.

In response to public tendencies to scrutinize rape survivors of abuse rather than perpetrators, Karki emphasized the need to support survivors and shift accountability toward offenders. Speaking against victim-blaming, she stated:

"We should be ashamed to question the victim."

She further argued that victim-blaming discourages individuals from speaking out and seeking justice.

Karki has also supported animal welfare initiatives, including campaigns marking World Stray Animal Day. Through her public platform, she has encouraged greater awareness of animal welfare issues and promoted the view that caring for animals is a shared community responsibility.

== In the media ==
Preeti Shrestha from Cinemandu said, “In the 2010s, the first name that comes to everyones mind when we say Nepali [heroine] is Priyanka Karki. She dominated the industry and made a huge impact on Nepali cinema.”

Karki is considered among the leading and highest paid Nepali actress. She is also one of the most followed Nepalese women on Instagram. QFX termed Karki the most profitable actress in Nepal. In 2017, Karki was ranked first in the "Top 10 Women and Men of the Year" list published by the weekly publication Kantipur Saptahik. In 2025, she topped IMDb's list of the "Top 10 Leading and Highest-Paid Nepali Actresses". She is brand ambassador for various of brands such as Britannia Good Day, Appy Fizz Nepal, TikTok Nepal, Bigmart, Ruslan, Coca-Cola, Vatsalya clinic, ClearTV & Subisu.

== Filmography ==
Key
†	Denotes films that have not yet been released

Films
	Film	Role	Notes
2012	3 Lovers	Diya	Double role – Diya/Liza; OFA Award for Popular Debutant Actress – WON
2013	Kollywood	Kaavya	Best Actress for National Film Awards 2069 – Nominated
2013	Vigilante 3D	Shristy	Nepal's first 3D film
2013	Karkash	—N/a	Special appearance
2013	Nepathya	Herself	Guest appearance
2014	Jholay	Riya	Crore club INFA Popular Awards Best Actor – WON
2014	Nai Nabhannu La 2	Saru	Crore Club; OFA Popular Awards Best Actress 2071 – WON; NEFTA Best Actor in a Supporting Role Female (WON); INFA Best Actor in a Supporting Role Female (WON); D Cine Awards Best Actor in a Supporting Role Female (WON)
2014	Aawaran	Shubani	Debut as Playback Singer/ OST featuring Yama Buddha
2014	Mero Best Friend	Ritu	Starring Resh Maratha, Diwas Upreity, Keki Adhikari (Cameo), Bimles Adhikari (Cameo)
2014	Hasiya	Item song	
2014	Punte Parade	School Teacher	
2014	Shree Paanch Ambare	—N/a	Cameo appearance in song "Yo maan ma hamesha"
2015	Suntali	Suntali	Official selection at the 19th Busan International Film Festival; NFDC National Film Award Best Actor Female (WON); National Film Critics Award (NFCA) Best Actor Female (WON); NEFTA Awards Best Actor Female (Popular)(WON); LG D Cine Award Best Actor Female Critics (WON)
2015	Mala	Mala	
2015	Sadanga	Salina	D Cine Awards Best Actor in a Negative role (NOM)
2015	Mission Paisa 2 - Reloaded	Item song "Chachari"	
2015	Nai na Bhannu la 3	Kusum	Crore Club
2015	Woda Number 6	Sushila	Crore Club in two days from Kathmandu Valley
2015	Lootera	Item Song "Blast Hune wala cha"	
2015	Kabaddi Kabaddi	Lolita Karki	Guest Appearance; Crore Club in two days
2016	Fanko	Lili	
2016	Classic	Jenny	Special Appearance
2016	How Funny	Ramita	Crore Club in six days
2016	Nai Nabhannu La 4	Ani	Crore club in three days
2016	Chhakka Panja	Champa	Grossed more than Rs 25 Crores.
2016	Purano Dunga	Chandu	Crore club in two days.
2017	Radhe	Priya	Crore Club in two days
2017	Laltin	Sana	
2017	Chhakka Panja 2	Uma	Crore club in two days
2017	Fateko Jutta	Indu	Crore club in two days
2018	Butterfly	Farasha	
2018	Changa Chet	Priya	
2018	Happy Days	Pinku	
2018	Shatru Gate	Sheetal	Crore club in two days
2018	Kohalpur Express	Champa	Crore club in five days
2018	Matti Mala	Item song "Bechi dinchu yo jawani"	
2018	Nai Nabhannu La 5	Kusum	Crore club in two days.
2018	Katha Kathmandu	Nora	
2018	Chhakka Panja 3	Rinku	Special Appearance
2018	Lily Bily	Mira	
2019	Anaagat	Kriti	
2019	Prem Diwas	Sapana	
2019	Dal Bhat Tarkari	—N/a	Special appearance in a song
2019	Hajar Juni Samma	Maya	
2022	Lakka Jawan	Prena	
2022	The Secrets of Radha	Special appearance (song)	Pauma Pauju
2023	Chi Musi Chi	Aahana	
2023	Fulbari	Amrita	
2024	Raavayan	Sultana	
2025	Mummy	Sapna	
2025	Rakshas	Ravanti	
2025	Hari Bahadur Ko Jutta	Inspector Aarti singh	
2025	Pahad	Rekha	
2025	Pari	Pari	
2026	Masterni		Also producer
2026	Pratibairam	Basanti	Item Song

Television
2006	The Glam Factor	Anchor	A fashion and lifestyle show
2006	Gharbeti Ba	Tina	Sitcom
2007	Glamour and Style	Anchor	Fashion based program
2007	Call and Win	Anchor	An hour-long weekly live show where callers could call, answer questions and win gift hampers.
2020-2023	Himalaya Roadies	Gang Leader	Adventure-based reality show

Web series
2019	Just Another Love Story	Amara	Also producer under Prinklebell Pictures
2023	Saahu Ba	Devika	Also producer under Prinklebell Pictures

== Discography ==
Year	Song
2014	Aawaran ft Yama Buddha
2015	Lucky (Cover) ft. Nattu Shah
2016	Maya ta Maya ho (Cover) ft. Ayushman Joshi
2016	Swatantra (single)
2016	Like I'm gonna lose you (Cover) ft. Ayushman Joshi
2019	Prem Diwas ft. Ayushman Joshi

== Accolades ==
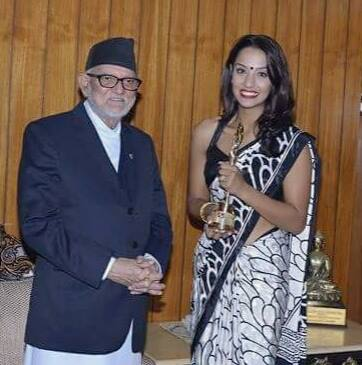
Karki felicitated NFDC National Film Award by former Prime Minister Sushil Koirala

Award	Year	Work	Category	Result	Ref(s)
Kamana Film Awards	2020	Nai Nabhannu La 5	Best Actor in a Supporting Role (Female)	Won	
Film Critics Society Nepal	2015	Suntali	Best Actress	Won	
NFDC National Film Awards	2017	Chhakka Panja	Best Actress	Won	
NFDC National Film Awards	2015	Suntali	Best Actress	Won	
FAAN Awards	2017	Chhakka Panja	Best Actress	Nominated	
NEFTA Film Awards	2015	—	Best Actress	Won	
