= Pema Dhondup =

Tibetan director

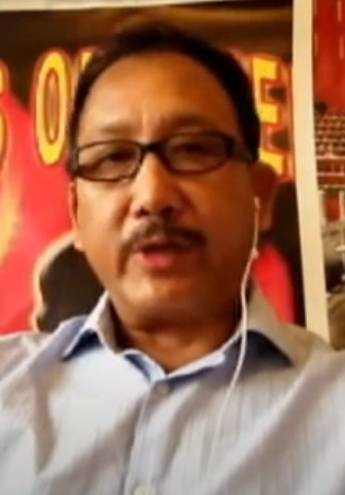
- Dhondup in 2013
- Born: Pema Dhondup Gakyil; Tibet
- Occupations: Film director; Actor; Voice actor
- Notable work: The Man from Kathmandu (2019); Uncharted franchise

Pema Dhondup Gakyil, who is professionally credited as Pema Dhondup, is a Tibetan film director and actor. He directed and produced We're No Monks (2004) and The Man from Kathmandu (2019), and he provided voiceovers for Tenzin in the Uncharted series of video games. He has resided in Los Angeles, California, since 2004.

== Biography ==
Dhondup was born in Tibet. Following the Chinese annexation of Tibet, his family fled to Jomsom, Nepal, before settling in Himachal Pradesh, India. Dhondup earned a degree in marketing from Kurukshetra University in 1990 and began working for the music division of CBS-Sony India. Over the next six years, he produced documentaries, commercial advertising, institutional films, and television series. He became interested in filmmaking after viewing Schindler's List in 1996. From 1999 to 2002 he studied at the School of Cinematic Arts at the University of Southern California on a Fulbright scholarship. Dhondup stated that he sought to use film to "tell our story, of our community, of our lost generation – a contemporary story of Tibetan youth". He and his wife founded their production company Clear Mirror Pictures in 2004. They have made their home in Los Angeles since 2004. In July 2017, Dhondup became a founding partner of TriCity Pictures, which produces films in the Himalayas for a global audience.

== Career ==
=== Directing ===
Dhondup made his directorial debut with the 2004 Tibetan drama We're No Monks (2004) starring Indian actor Gulshan Grover and Tibetan actor Tsering Dorjee in the lead roles. In a BBC News interview, Dhondup called it "the first film to explore discontent among the young Tibetan exiles". The film was screened at the 2004 Himalayan Film Festival and received mixed reviews from critics and audiences; according to Nyay Bhushan of Phayul.com, it "attempts to deconstruct the image of Tibetans as peaceful monks awash in Technicolor glory in Hollywood".

In 2013, Dhondup wrote and directed a short film called Arise, a drama which won Best Director and Special Jury Prize in the Free Spirit Film Festival.

In 2019, Dhondup directed The Man from Kathmandu, an action thriller about radicalism. It stars Gulshan Grover in his Nepalese film debut, Hameed Sheikh, Anna Sharma, and Karma Shakya in the lead roles. The film was made on a budget of five crore Nepalese Rupees (रू 50 million) and was filmed in Kathmandu and Los Angeles. The film has received mixed reviews from audiences and critics, some critics rating the film one out of five. In an interview with The Kathmandu Post, Dhondup said he wanted to make a "film that would expose Nepal and its heritage to the world".

=== Acting ===
Dhondup has voiced the character Tenzin, a Tibetan man who is unable to speak English, in the video game series Uncharted. Since his first appearance in 2009's Uncharted 2: Among Thieves, Dhondup has portrayed the character in 2011's Uncharted 3: Drake's Deception and 2016's Uncharted 4: A Thief's End. The character is motion-captured by Robin Atkin Downes.

== Filmography ==
=== Films ===
| Year | Name | Notes |
|---|---|---|
| 2004 | We're No Monks | |
| 2019 | The Man from Kathmandu | |

=== Video games ===
| Year | Name | Character | Notes |
|---|---|---|---|
| 2009 | Uncharted 2: Among Thieves | Tenzin | |
| 2011 | Uncharted 3: Drake's Deception | Tenzin | |
| 2016 | Uncharted 4: A Thief's End | Tenzin | |

== Awards ==
| Year | Ceremony | Category | Work | Result | Refs. |
|---|---|---|---|---|---|
| 2013 | Free Spirit Film Festival | Best Director | Arise | Won | |
| 2013 | Free Spirit Film Festival | Special Jury Prize | Arise | Won | |
