= Tsering Dorjee =

Tibetan actor (born 1970)

Tsering Dorjee Bawa
- Born: April 23, 1970 (age 56); Toe Bawa, Ngari, Tibet, China
- Education: Tibetan Institute of Performing Arts
- Occupations: Actor, Producer, Musician and Dancer
- Years active: 1994-present
- Children: 2
- Website: https://tseringbawa.com/

Tsering Dorjee Bawa (Tibetan: ཚེ་རིང་རྡོ་རྗེ། born April 23, 1970) is a Tibetan actor, producer, musician and dancer of Tibetan descent. He acted in the Oscar nominated film ‘Himalaya' in 1999 and has created the original soundtrack with Michael Becker for 2009 Emmy Award-winning documentary ‘The Woman of Tibet - A Quiet Revolution’. He was nominated twice for outstanding featured performance in play, male for his off-Broadway show, 'The Oldest Boy'.

He had worked on numerous ensemble art works with many renown world artists. He currently resides in Bay Area, California and teaches Tibetan music, conducts art workshops for the university students and professionals and takes acting assignments.

== Early life ==
Tsering Dorjee was born in Toe Bawa in Ngari, Western Tibet. In 1986, he enrolled in the Tibetan Institute of Performing Arts, Dharamshala, India at the age of 16 to pursue his love for art and music. Graduating from the art school in 1994 with an advanced degree in Tibetan dance, music and opera. He obtained his master's degree in 2000 and continued working as an arts instructor for the institute.

To further pursue his passion for acting he attended acting training in France, The Netherlands, India and Barbizon International School of Acting and Modeling in San Francisco, USA.

== Career ==
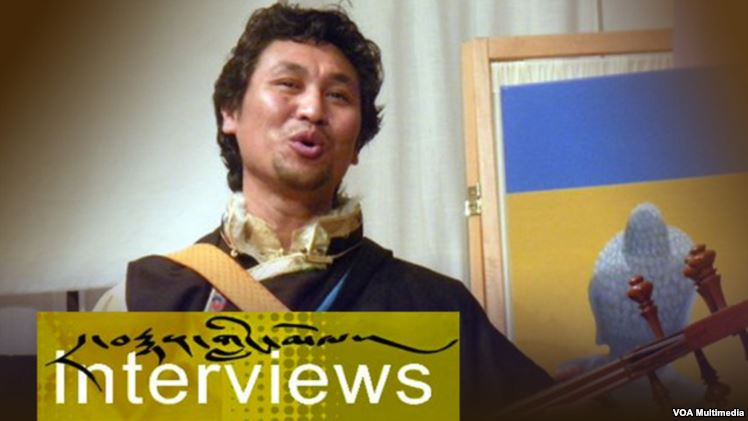
Tsering Dorjee Bawa

In 2000, after graduating from the arts school he worked as an arts instructor and in-house artists for the Tibetan Institute of Performing Arts in Dharamshala, India.

In 1999, he acted in Oscar nominated movie ‘Himalaya’ alongside Lhakpa Tsamchoe, a French film directed by Eric Valli.

In 2009, he collaborated with notable composer Michael Becker and created the original soundtrack for the 2009 Emmy Award-winning documentary The Woman of Tibet - A Quiet Revolution.

He appeared in the off-Broadway show ‘The Oldest Boy’, by Sarah Ruhl at the Lincoln Center Theater in New York, which enhanced his acting career and got an opportunity to work with many theaters company Marin Theater Company, CA, San Diego Repertory Theater, CA and Jungle Theater, Minneapolis. In 2008, he celebrated the Losar festival with a performance in Toronto, Ontario, Canada with Passang Lhamo. Later, he performed the play Tibet, A Year After at Oakland, California to celebrate the 73rd birthday of Tenzin Gyatso the 14th Dalai Lama.

Amongst his well-known songs is Mani Do Bum.

He starred as the main protagonist in the independent feature film, "My Son Tenzin," produced by Seykhar Films.

In 2024, he was featured in the South Indian film "Demonte Colony 2", which has garnered significant acclaim and achieved blockbuster status across South India.

== Awards ==
He was nominated twice for an outstanding featured performance in play, male for ‘The Oldest Boy’ for the 2015 Craig Noel Awards from San Diego Theater.

In 2016 he received the TBA Award for Outstanding Choreography for ‘The Oldest Boy’.

== Filmography ==
Year	Title	Role	Language	Ref.
1999	Himalaya - l'enfance d'un chef	Rabkie	Nepali	
2004	We're No Monks	Pasanag	Tibetan	
2009	Valhalla Rising	Indian	English	
2024	Demonte Colony 2	Daoshi	Tamil	
