= Raveena Desraj Shrestha =

Nepalese banker

Personal details
- Born: Raveena Desraj Shrestha; April 27, 1970 (age 56) Kathmandu
- Spouse: Stuart Chapman (m. 2023)
- Children: Ayushman Joshi Aashirman DS Joshi
- Occupation: Banker

Raveena Desraj Shrestha (Nepali: रवीना देसराज श्रेष्ठ) is the former Chief Executive Officer of Mega Bank Nepal. She was elected as the vice-chairman of Women Entrepreneur Development Committee appointed by the (FNCCI).

Shrestha started her career as trainee assistant in Standard Chartered Bank. She joined Mega Bank Nepal Limited as the chief business officer and corporate affairs and was also the DCEO of the bank. Shrestha is a member of Nepal Chamber Of Commerce (NCC) in the Bank, Finance & Insurance Committee. She is the vice-chairman of Women Entrepreneur Development Committee appointed by the Federation of Nepalese Chambers of Commerce and Industry (FNCCI).

Shrestha has won two 21st Century Golden Phoenix Award from Malaysia-based Asia Excellence Entrepreneur Federation one in 2014 and the other in 2015. She also won the Lady of Excellence Award in 2014.

Shrestha had a cameo in a thriller movie, Soul Sister.
