= Lhamo (surname) =

Lhamo is a surname. Notable people with the surname include:

- Khandro Lhamo (1914–2003), doctor of Tibetan medicine
- Passang Lhamo, Tibetan nun, activist, and singer
- Rinchen Lhamo (1901–1929), Tibetan writer
- Sonam Lhamo (born 1988), Bhutanese actress
- Tare Lhamo (1938–2002), Tibetan Buddhist master, visionary, and treasure revealer
- Tsewang Lhamo (died 1812), queen of the Kingdom of Derge
- Tsundue Pema Lhamo (1886–1922), first Queen consort of Bhutan
- Yungchen Lhamo (born 1960s), Tibetan singer-songwriter living in the United States
