= Shilpa Maskey =

Nepali Actress

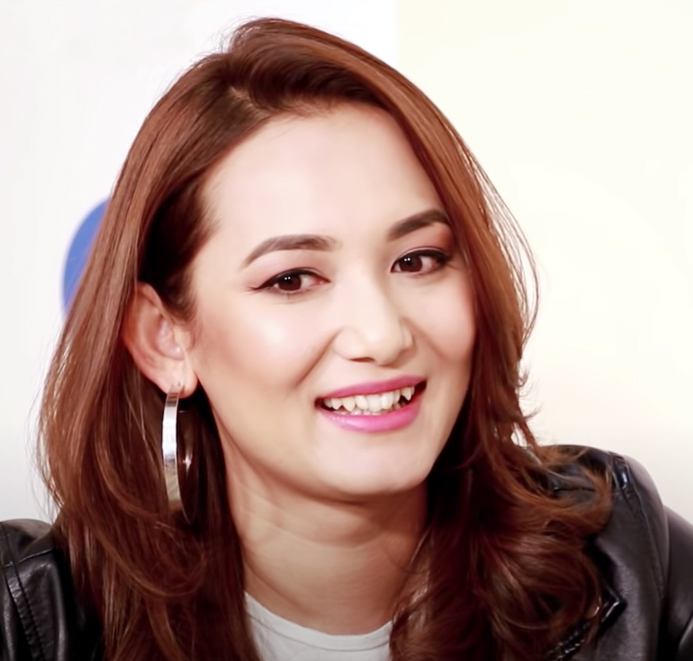
- Shilpa Maskey in 2019
- Born: Shilpa Maskey; April 14, 1992 (age 33); Biratnagar, Nepal
- Occupation: Actress

Shilpa Maskey (born April 14, 1992 in Biratnagar, Nepal) is a Nepalese film actress, model and dancer. She made her debut in the Nepali film industry as the lead in the movie "The Break Up," opposite Aashirman DS Joshi. Her second Nepali movie was Kagaz Patra opposite Najir Hussain. She has done many music videos, films, photoshoots, and advertisements both internationally and nationally. She has made minor appearances in Hollywood projects like Doctor Strange and Mission: Impossible – Fallout, and Netflix series The Crown, Season 2, episode 5 and short movie Shooting an Elephant and Bollywood movie Gold. Her third nepali movie was Sano Mann alongside Ayushman Joshi and afterwards, her following film, "Kathaputali," premiered on December 31, 2021. Subsequently, she appeared in "Life in LA," which was released on May 20, 2022 and she starred in the movies "Fulbari" and "Parastree," both of which were released in 2023.

== Filmography ==
| Year | Name | Role | Notes |
|---|---|---|---|
| 2016 | Shooting an Elephant | | Short Movie |
| 2016 | Doctor Strange | | Extra |
| 2018 | Mission: Impossible – Fallout | | Extra |
| 2018 | Gold | | Extra/Dancer |
| 2019 | The Break Up | Sara | Debut Nepali Film |
| 2019 | Kagaz Patra | Bunu | |
| 2019 | Sano Mann | Sanya | |
| 2021 | Kathaputali | | Main Role |
| 2022 | Life in LA | | Leading Role |
| 2023 | Fulbari | | Leading Role |
| 2023 | Parastree | | Main Role |
| 2025 | Devi | | |
