= Mariska Pokharel =

Nepalese actress

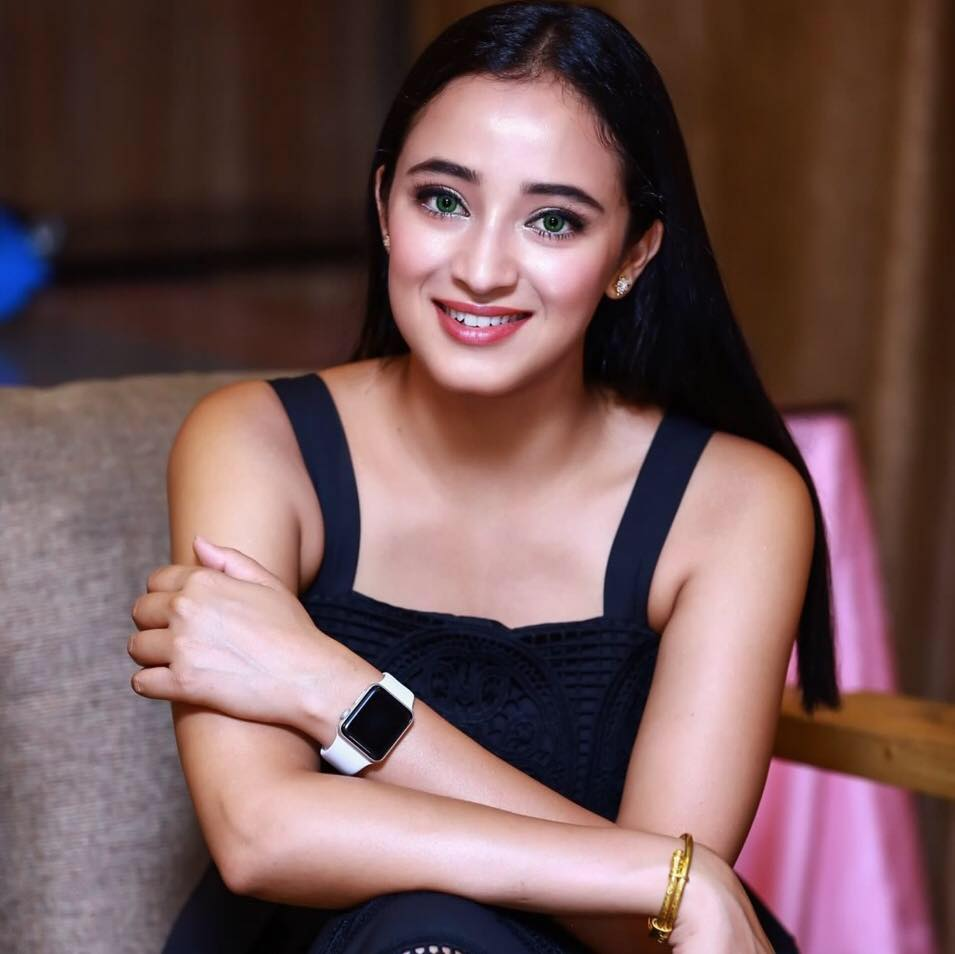
- Occupations: Actress, model, art teacher
- Years active: 2014–present
- Height: 5.6 ft 0 in (171 cm)

Mariska Pokharel (Nepali: मरिष्का पोखरेल) is a Nepalese film actress, model and artist. Her family gave her a Hebrew name 'Mariska' which means Mermaid or goddess of the sea. She made her acting debut in the movie Ke Ma Timro Hoina Ra (2016) directed by Akash Adhikari. Her second movie, Chapali Height 2, a psychological thriller, was also released in that same year. It is a sequel to the 2012 film Chapali Height.

== Career ==
Before appearing in Nepali movies, Pokharel was featured in an upcoming Hindi drama movie Yaara. The movie directed by Tigmanshu Dhulia is based in 'A Gang Story' by Oliver Marchal and features Vidyut Jammwal and Shruti Haasan in leading roles. She made her acting debut in the movie Ke Ma Timro Hoina Ra (2016) alongside Aaryan Adhikari. She subsequently starred in Chapali Height 2 (2016), Lamphoo (2018), Pandit Bajeko Lauri (2018), Sali Kasko Bhenako (2018) and Mr. Virgin (2018). For her role as an escort in the movie Mr. Virgin (2018), Pokharel says she had to dive into research about the lifestyle and the daily schedule of 'call girls' in order to prepare to face the camera.

In 2015, Pokharel appeared in the music video for Swaroop Raj Acharya's Aaja Man Ma Timro. Since then she has worked on two dozen of Nepali music videos already by the mid of 2019. Her most viewed music videos on YouTube include Shirphool and Salko Paat. Bishnu Majhi's Salko Paat brought her fame and she gained notice by all age group of audiences.

== Filmography ==
Key
†	Denotes films that have not yet been released

=== As actress ===
Year	Film	Role	Notes
2016	Ke Ma Timro Hoina Ra	Shreya	Debut
2016	Chapali Height 2	Aakriti	
2018	Lamphoo	Aarati	
2018	Pandit Bajeko Lauri	Janaki	
2018	Mr. Virgin	Roji	
2018	Sali Kasko Bhenako	Manisara	
2020	Yaara		Hindi Movie
2020	Guide†	Sara	
2020	Purba Pashchim†	Saru	

=== As director ===
Following are the music videos which are directed by her are as follows:

Year	Title	Notes
2018	Timilai Dukhna Ft. Pushpa Khadka and Mariska Pokharel	Music video
2018	Tyo Sapana Ft. Aakash Shrestha and Mariska Pokharel	Music video
2018	Mero Pran Timinai Ft. Mariska Pokharel	Music video

== Music video ==
Pokharel has worked on nearly two dozen music videos already by the mid 2019. Some of the music videos played by her are given below:

Year	Title	Artist
2016	Ma Haraye	Deepak Gurung
2016	Ankha Ankha	Urjaa Band
2017	Shirphool	Devraj/Tara Shrees
2017	Juna Jasto Sital Timro Maya	Suman KC
2018	Jitera Pani Haar Ma Chhu	Shiva Pariyar
2018	Salko Paat	Kulendra Bishwakarma & Bishnu Majhi
2019	Sarhai Man Atyaune	Bishnu Majhi & Bikram Malla
2019	Soltini Jyu	Jibihang Rai / Kishu Gurung
2019	Banmara	Bishnu Majhi & Hemant Sharma
2020	Maunata Ma Dherai	Ram Krishna Dhakal

== Philanthropy ==
Beyond the silver screen, Pokharel is actively engaged in organizations working for children’s rights and keenly devotes time to her childhood fantasy of arts and paintings. She has been working as a coordinator for Human Life Protection Forum (non-profit organization) since early 2018. Pokharel is also involved with the service organization Rotary since 2017. Rotary International MHM is an American international service organization whose stated purpose is to bring together business and professional leaders in order to provide humanitarian service and to advance goodwill and peace around the world. She is an active member of Rotary Club of Baneshwor and is also the Director (Chair Public Relations) for 2019-20.
