= Paramita RL Rana =

Nepalese actress, model and singer

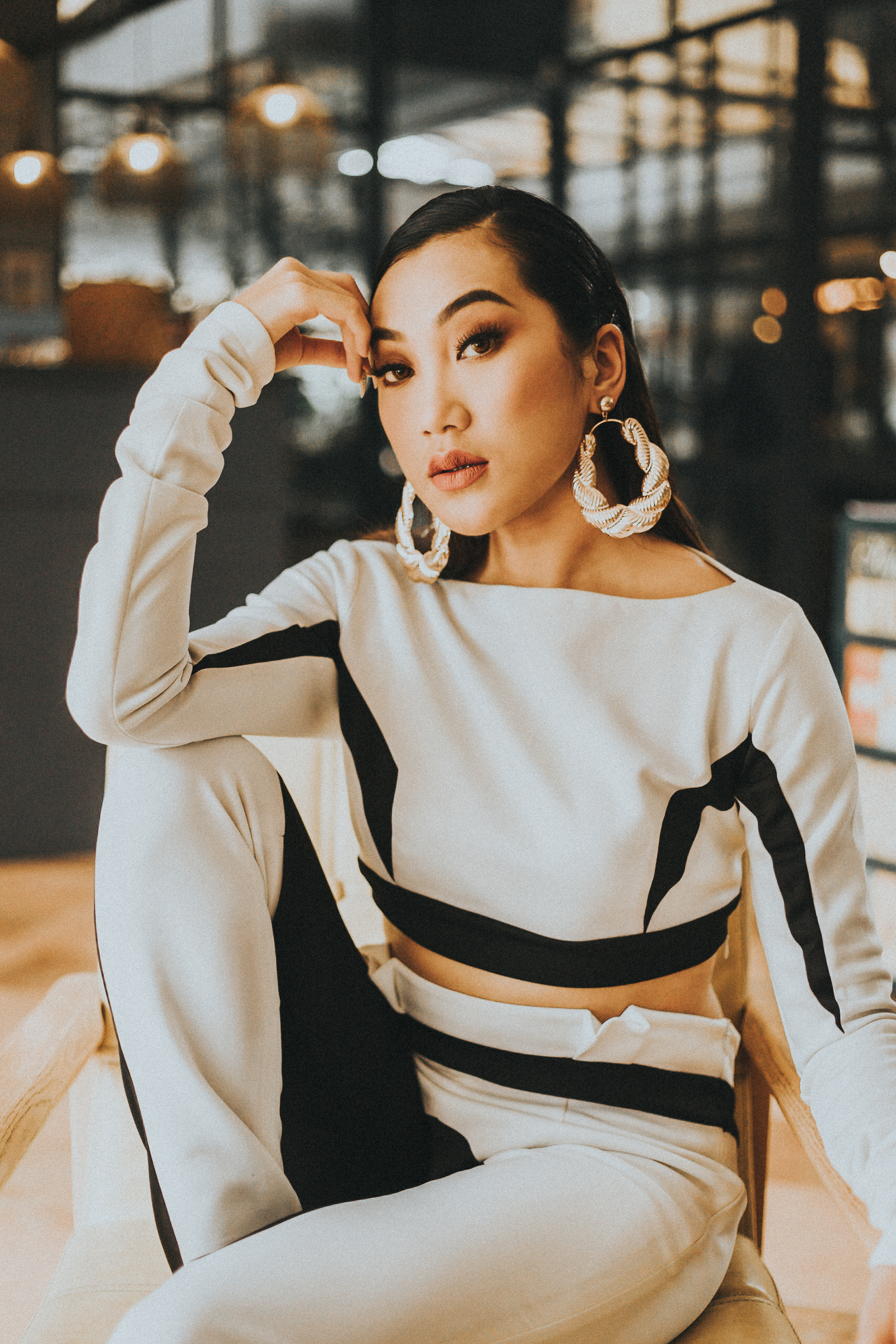
- Born: Paramita Tania Parker Rajya Laxmi Rana; October 2, 1993 (age 32); Lalitpur, Nepal
- Other name: Pam
- Education: St. Mary's High School, Jawalakhel
- Occupations: Actress, dancer
- Years active: 2016–present
- Known for: Actress, influencer, singer

Paramita Rajya Laxmi Rana (born October 2, 1993 in Lalitpur, Nepal), known professionally as Paramita RL Rana or simply Paramita Rana, is a Nepalese film actress, model, singer, influencer. She rose into fame following her debut role in the film Chapali Height 2 opposite Ayushman Joshi.

== Controversy ==
In December 2019, Rana was a passenger in a car that struck and killed a woman. The driver of the car, Prithvi Malla, was drunk at the time and was subsequently charged with vehicular homicide. Rana's actions in the aftermath of the accident were heavily criticized for being insensitive as she escaped from the crime scene and did not admit to being involved until weeks later.

== Filmography ==
Year	Name	Role	Notes
2016	Chapali Height 2	Nisha Joshi	Debut film
2018	Rose	Rose Rana	Lead Role
2018	Changa Chet	Urmila	Supporting
2019	The Man from Kathmandu	Sujata	Supporting
2019	The Karma	Ambika Devi	Lead Role
