= Milarepa (2006 film) =

2006 film directed by Neten Chokling

- Directed by: Neten Chokling
- Written by: Neten Chokling; Tenzing Choyang Gyari
- Produced by: Raymond Steiner
- Starring: Jamyang Lodro; Gimyan Lodro; Jamyang Nyima; Kelsang Chukie Tethong; Orgyen Tobgyal; Lhakpa Tsamchoe
- Cinematography: Paul Warren
- Music by: Joel Diamond
- Release date: 15 February 2006 (Berlin International Film Festival)
- Running time: 95 minutes
- Country: Bhutan
- Language: Tibetan

Milarepa (Tibetan: མི་ལ་རས་པའི་རྣམ་ཐར།།, Wylie: mi-la-ras-pa'i rnam-thar) is a 2006 Tibetan-language film about the life of the most famous Tibetan tantric yogi, the eponymous Milarepa. The film was shot in the Spiti Valley, high in the Himalayas in the Zanskar region close to the border between India and Tibet due to the location's resemblance to the Tibetan landscape.

Directed by Neten Chokling, a Lama from Western Bhutan who has previously worked with Khyentse Norbu on the films such as The Cup and Travellers and Magicians, the film is about the adventurous formative years of the legendary Buddhist mystic, Milarepa (1052–1135) who is one of the most widely known Tibetan Saints. The film combined myth, biography, adventure, history and docudrama.

The film featured Lhakpa Tsamchoe in her return to the silver screen in a supporting role as Aunt Peydon during young Milarepa's formative years.

The tale is a staple in Tibetan Traditions, Buddhism, and the legend of Milarepa elevates him to the status of national hero in Tibet and nearly so in Buddhist regions of India, China and Pakistan. He is one of the so-called Tibetan Saints or great yogis in Tibetan Buddhism.

A second part, of Milarepa's later life was planned but never released.

== Cast ==
- Jamyang Lodro as Thopaga
- Gimyan Lodro as Milarepa
- Jamyang Nyima (credited as Jamyang Nyima Tashi)
- Kelsang Chukie Tethong as Kargyen
- Orgyen Tobgyal as Yongten Trogyal
- Lhakpa Tsamchoe as Aunt Peydon

== Reception ==
On the review aggregator website Rotten Tomatoes, 41% of 27 critics' reviews are positive. The website's consensus reads: "Milarepa's confusing plot structure, simplistic message, and poor production values cause it to fall flat." Metacritic, which uses a weighted average, assigned the film a score of 52 out of 100, based on 10 critics, indicating "mixed or average" reviews.
