= Katha Kathmandu =

- Film poster featuring Pramod Agrahari (left), and Priyanka Karki (right).
- Nepali: कथा काठमाडौँ
- Directed by: Sangita Shrestha
- Written by: Sangita Shrestha
- Produced by: Bijay Rai
- Starring: Priyanka Karki; Pramod Agrahari; Ayushman Joshi; Sanjog Koirala; Sandhya K.C.; Prekshya Adhikari
- Cinematography: Lujaw Singh
- Edited by: Mitra Gurung
- Music by: Songs: Mohit Munal; Kamal Khatri; Pradip Bastola; Background Scores: Shailesh Shrestha
- Production company: Aahana Films
- Distributed by: HighlightsNepal
- Release date: 28 September 2018 (Nepal)
- Running time: 125 Minute
- Country: Nepal
- Language: Nepali

Katha Kathmandu (Nepali: कथा काठमाडौँ, British English: Story of Kathmandu), sometimes known as Katha Kathmandu: Stories of Lust, Love & Life, is a 2018 Nepalese drama crime romance film directed and written by Sangita Shrestha. The film is produced by Bijay Rai under the banner of Aahana Films. The film stars Priyanka Karki, Pramod Agrahari, Ayushman Joshi, Sanjog Koirala, Sandhya K.C., and Prekshya Adhikari in the lead roles. The movie is about three inter connections of three men who live in Kathmandu.

== Plot ==
The first segment in the film is about two couple Noora (Priyanka Karki) and Saurav (Pramod Agrahari). The second segment in the film is about Kavya (Sandhya K.C.) and Rakesh (Sanjog Koirala). And the last segment in the film is about Aayush (Ayushman Joshi) and Sikah (Prekshya Adhikari)

== Cast ==
- Priyanka Karki as Noora
- Pramod Agrahari as Saurav
- Ayushman Joshi as Aayush
- Sanjog Koirala as Rakesh
- Sandhya K.C. as Kavya
- Prekshya Adhikari as Sikah

== Soundtrack ==
No.	Title	Lyrics	Music	Singer(s)	Length
1.	"Raatko Kura"	Pradeep Bastola	Pradeep Bastola	Indira Joshi	4:51
2.	"Jun Ani Tara"	Ishan Subba	Dipesh Subba	Sugam Pokharel	3:12
3.	"Dhulomandu"	Bullet Flo	Bullet Flo	Bullet Flo, Hari Bansha Acharya	4:45
