= Sanrakshan =

- Directed by: Purnendu jha
- Screenplay by: Ramesh Ranjan Jha; Naresh Mishra
- Based on: Political, Drama, Thriller
- Produced by: Shweta Shah; Pradeep Kumar Udaya; Nandu Shrivastav; Narendra Maharjan
- Starring: Nikhil Upreti; Shweta Shah; Saugat Malla; Ashishma Nakarmi; Malina Joshi; Nirdesh sriwastav
- Cinematography: Purushottam Pradhan
- Edited by: Bipin Malla
- Music by: Pravesh Mallick
- Production company: Purnendu Production
- Distributed by: Purnendu Productions
- Release date: 28 July 2017
- Running time: 2h 18m
- Country: Nepal
- Language: Nepali
- Budget: $1000000

Sanrakshan (Nepali: संरक्षण) is an action movie which features Nikhil Upreti and Saugat Malla in main role of the movie. This movie tells the story of the politics of Nepal how they use their power to control whole nation.

== Cast ==
- Nikhil Upreti
- Saugat Malla
- Malina Joshi
- Ashishma Nakarmi
- Ramesh Ranjan Jha
- Pramod Agrahari
- Amitesh Shah
- Nandu Shreewastav
- Sushant Shrestha
- Nirdesh Sriwastav

== Songs ==
No.	Title	Lyrics	Music	Singer(s)	Length
1.	"Holi"	Dhirendra Premarshi	Pravesh Mallick	Neha Priyadarshini, Pravesh Mallick	3:37
2.	"Kishwori Lal"	Roshan Janakpuri	Pravesh Mallick	Ritika Parmeshwar, Pravesh Mallick, Prem Prakash Karan	3:59
3.	"Samjhana Ko Saarangi"	Dhirendra Premarshi	Pravesh Mallick	Swaroop Raj Acharya	5:06
