= Gangster Blues =

- Theatrical release poster
- Nepali: ग्यांगस्टार ब्लूज
- Directed by: Hem Raj BC
- Written by: Hem Raj BC
- Produced by: Saroj Neupane
- Starring: Aashirman DS Joshi; Anna Sharma; Samyam Puri; Rojisha Shahi; Aruna Karki; Ram Babu Gurung; Pramod Agrahari
- Cinematography: Shailendra D. Karki
- Edited by: Banish Shah
- Music by: Songs: Kali Prasad Baskota; Background Scores: Shailesh Shrestha; Rohit Shakya
- Production company: BC Motion Pictures
- Release date: 18 August 2017
- Running time: 153 Min
- Country: Nepal
- Language: Nepali

Gangster Blues (Nepali: ग्यांगस्टार ब्लूज) is a Nepali romantic thriller movie directed by Hem Raj BC. featuring Aashirman DS Joshi and Anna Sharma in lead roles. The film was shot in Nepalgunj and Achham. The film is an action packed love story which revolves around two protagonists Aakash (Aashirman) and Aarzoo (Anna), it shows how in the corrupted world the youth have a lot of reasons to turn into criminals and when you have someone special you love there will be much more consequences that come with it. The movie did good business but received mixed reviews. One of the film's songs, Ajambari went on to become a huge hit with over 20 million views on YouTube till date.

== Plot ==
Aakash after being expelled from his 3rd semester BBA in Kathmandu gets back to his hometown, Nepalgunj. Getting back to hometown turns out to be a beautiful event for him when he finds his school life crush Aarzoo who is a Medical student at Nepalgunj Medical College. Aarzoo has a past; her mother committed suicide when she was young which is why she is repelled by violence. Aakash starts working for local Gang for easy money to impress Aarzoo but she is not aware of this. They fall for each other gradually. As time goes by their relationship as well as Aakash's involvement in the gang grows, turning him into Gangster. Aakash gets into street fight that drags him in the jail. Further dragging him into murder charge. Aarzoo feels repelled and cheated when Aakash is exposed to his doings and leaves him. How they move forward and deal with the consequences they face is "Gangster Blues".

== Cast ==
- Aashirman DS Joshi as Aakash
- Anna Sharma as Aarzoo
- Samyam Puri as Kallu
- Rojisha Shahi as Tara
- Aruna Karki as Aakash's mother
- Ram Babu Gurung as DSP
- Pramod Agrahari as Afzal

== Soundtrack ==
No.	Title	Singer(s)	Length
1.	"Ajambari"	Kali Prasad Baskota, Melina Rai	3:40
2.	"Aadha Kura"	Sanup Paudel	3:47
3.	"Abala"	Banika Pradhan, Kali Prasad Baskota	3:16

== See also ==
- Aashirman DS Joshi
- Anna Sharma
- Rojisha Shahi
- Ram Babu Gurung
- Kali Prasad Baskota
- Melina Rai
