= Password (2019 Nepali film) =

2019 Nepali film

- Theatrical release poster
- Directed by: Samrat Basnet
- Written by: Bikram Joshi
- Starring: Anoop Bikram Shahi; Bikram Joshi; Buddhi Tamang; Rabindra Jha; Chhulthim Dolma Gurung
- Release date: 13 September 2019 (Nepal)
- Country: Nepal
- Language: Nepali

Password is a 2019 Nepali film, directed by Samrat Basnet. The film is written by Bikram Joshi and produced by Amit Basnet, and Hiral Joshi under the banner of AB International. The film stars Anoop Bikram Shahi, Bikram Joshi, Buddhi Tamang, Rabindra Jha, Chhulthim Dolma Gurung, Prabin Khatioda, Dhiren Shakya. The film generally received mixed feedback from the critics.

== Plot ==
"Password" is a Nepali crime thriller centered around the theft of a valuable Lord Shiva statue from the Pashupatinath temple in Kathmandu. The story begins with the Nepal Police failing to apprehend the suspect behind the murder of his father and the theft of the sacred idol. To solve the case, the police assign a three-member team, known for their incompetence, to track down the criminal believed to be hiding in London.

As the investigation unfolds, it reveals a complex web involving two Nepali criminals in London, Bikki and Jojo, whose rivalry indicates deeper criminal activities. The narrative incorporates multiple twists, flashbacks, and changing perspectives, making it somewhat challenging to follow. It also explores a love triangle involving Bikki and two Nepali women he encounters in London.

A notable element in the film is the securing of a gold Shiva Linga in a CGI-safe with a password, symbolizing the central theme of secrets and mysteries. The storyline suggests that Bikki, although the primary suspect, might be innocent, and his decision to stay silent complicates his innocence. The film also highlights themes of police corruption, betrayal, and the blurred lines between good and bad.

Throughout the movie, the investigation aims to decode the password protecting the Shiva Linga and uncover the truth behind the theft, murder, and hidden motives. The narrative combines action, suspense, and drama, set against an international backdrop, culminating in a tense climax that ties together the themes of crime, faith, and deception.

== Cast ==
- Anoop Bikram Shahi
- Bikram Joshi
- Buddhi Tamang
- Rabindra Jha
- Chhulthim Dolma Gurung
- Prabin Khatioda
- Dhiren Shakya
- Sunny Leone in an item number "Aajako"

== Soundtrack ==
No.	Title	Singer(s)	Length
1.	"Aajako Sam"	Durga Kharel

== Release ==
Diwakar Pyakurel of Onlinekhabar wrote, "thanks to mediocre cinematography, the movie is unlikely to stand out". Sunny Mahat of The Annapurna Express wrote, "Password is an entirely unintelligent production that is made with a big budget but bad skills".
