= Thinle Lhondup =

Nepalese actor

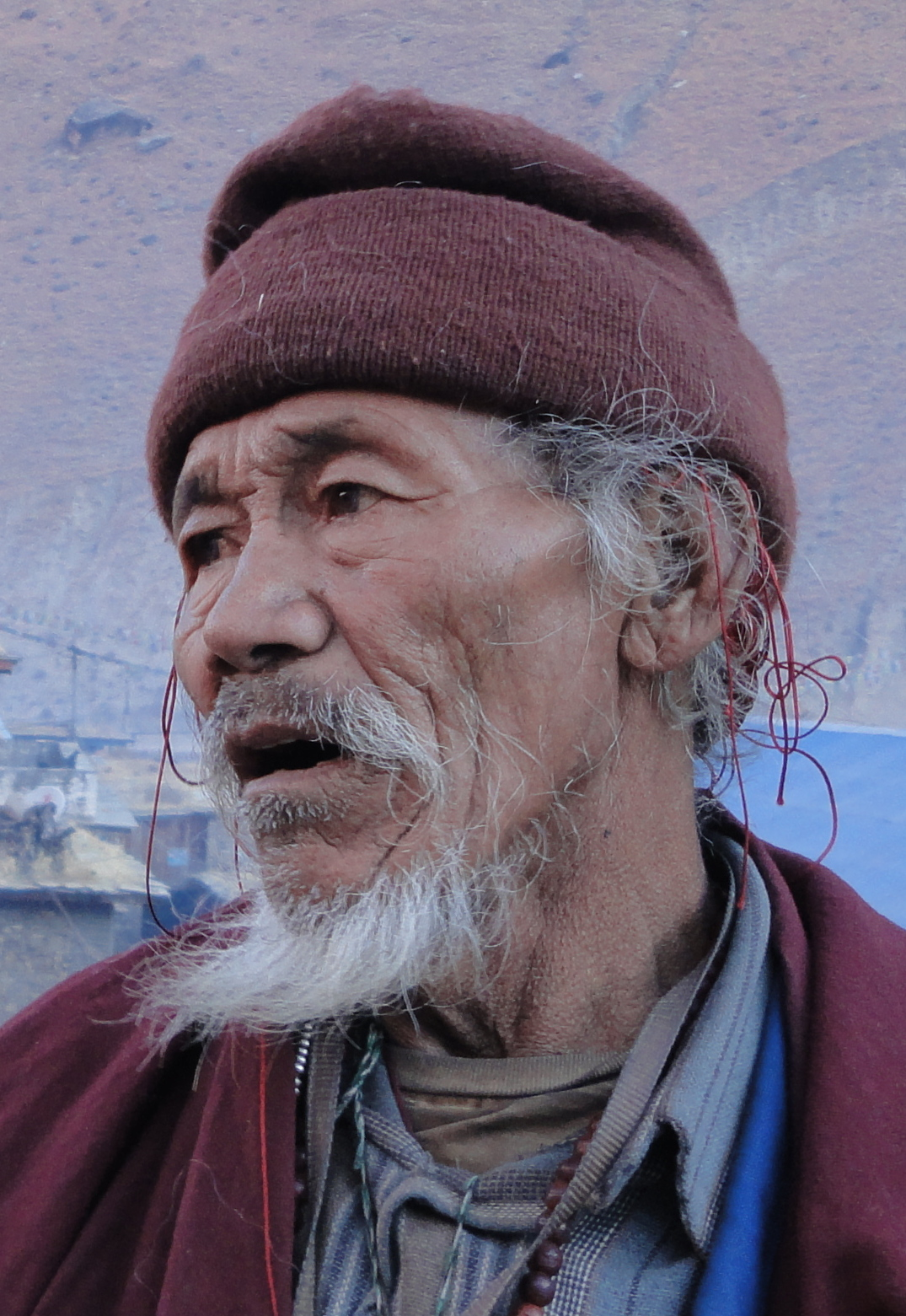
- Thinle
- Born: 1943/44; Dolpa District, Nepal
- Died: April 24, 2016 (aged 72); Dolpa, Nepal
- Occupation: Film actor

Thinle Lhondup (Nepali: थिन्ले लोन्डुप), also known as Thinley or Thinlen (1943/44 – April 24, 2016), was a popular Nepalese actor from Dolpa, Nepal. He is best known for his role as the elderly-community leader named Tinle in Himalaya, a 1999 adventure film directed by Éric Valli, a French film director. The film was nominated in the Best Foreign Film category at the 72nd Academy Awards. He also appeared in some Nepali music videos, including the popular "Sa Karnali" by the Nepali band Nepathya.

Thinle died on April 24, 2016, in Dolpa, Nepal after falling from the trail whilst riding a horse, aged 72. He had also been suffering from stomach cancer for which he took treatment at Kathmandu.

Year	Movie	Role
1999	Himalaya (film)	Actor
2003	Sa Karnali (Music Video)	...
2012	Iku (Film)	Mukhiya
2015	Everesutu: kamigami No itadaki (Film)	...
