= Birdnesters of Thailand =

1991 film

- Directed by: Éric Valli; Alain Majani d'Inguimbert
- Produced by: Éric Valli; Alain Majani d'Inguimbert
- Edited by: Françoise Garnault
- Production company: Wind Horse Productions
- Distributed by: Antenne 2
- Release date: 1991
- Running time: 26 minutes
- Country: France
- Language: French

Birdnesters of Thailand (French: Chasseurs des ténèbres) is a 1991 French short documentary film directed by Éric Valli. It was nominated for an Academy Award for Best Documentary Short. In the United States, it aired on TBS National Geographic Explorer.
