= Pramod Agrahari =

Nepalese actor

- Born: Nepal
- Occupation: Actor
- Years active: 2013–present
- Awards: Kamana Film Awards for Best Negative Role

Pramod Agrahari (Nepali :प्रमोद अग्रहरि ) is a Nepali actor. He made his film debut from movie Uma. He is known for his films namely White Sun, Gangster Blues, Katha Kathmandu etc. He is the highest paid actor in the Nepalese film industry.

== Filmography ==
Key
†	Denotes film or TV productions that have not yet been released

- All films are in Nepali-language, unless otherwise noted.

Year	Film	Role	Notes	Ref.
2013	Uma	Vineet	Debut film	
2014	Suntali	Bajrang		
2015	Chankhe Shankhe Pankhe	Police officer		
2016	Jhumkee			
2016	White Sun	Police officer		
2016	Chhakka Panja	Baba Masta Mola		
2017	Sanrakshan			
2017	Gangster Blues	Afzal		
2017	Dui Rupaiyan	Police officer		
2018	Pandit Bajeko Lauri	Chaite		
2018	Katha Kathmandu	Saurav		
2018	Sushree Sampatti			
2019	Jay Shree Daam	Inspector Yadav		
2019	Kumva Karan			
2019	Xira	Raja		
2023	Adrishya			
2024	Chitra	Kancho Dai		
2024	Agastya: Chapter 1	Tripathi		
2025	Pitambar	Dhananjay Singh		
2026	Hangor †	TBA	Debut in Bangladeshi film; Filming	

== Awards and nominations ==
Year	Award	Category	Nominated work	Result	Ref.
2018	Kamana Film Awards	Best Supporting Actor	Sanrakshan	Nominated	
2020	Kamana Film Awards	Best Actor In Negative Role	Katha Kathmandu	Won	
2021	NEFTA Film Awards	Best Actor In Negative Role	Katha Kathmandu	Won	
2024	Cine Circle Awards	Best Negative Role	Agastya: Chapter 1	Won	
