= Dhiren Shakya =

Nepali actor

- धिरेन शाक्य
- Born: 25 February 1971 (age 55)
- Occupation: Actor
- Years active: 1994–present
- Awards: National Film Awards

Dhiren Shakya (Nepali: धिरेन शाक्य; born 25 February 1971) is a Nepalese actor, who has appeared in Nepali feature films and music videos.

Shakya starred in more than a hundred Nepali films in the 1990s and early 2000s. He has received a number of awards throughout his career including National Film Awards for best actor. He also acted in more than 70 music videos.

His successful films include Krodh, Jibandaan, Chino, Simana, Desh Paradesh, Ajambari Maya, Arjun, Insaaf and Janam Janam.

== Personal life ==
He is from Palpa district in western Nepal. He has two daughters. He hails from a military family and had himself joined the British army, only to leave it within six months. His father was in an Indian Gurkha regiment. His older daughter was undergoing army officer's training as of February 2017.

== Filmography ==
Shakya's first feature film was Pahilo Prem. He then got offered a role in Karja. He went on to act in more than 100 films including Saubhagya, Jun Tara, Simana, Janma Janma Chahari Dushman, Daag, Bhisma-Pratigya, Krodh, Sahar, Apsara, Ansabanda, Deurali, Khelauna, Bhagawan, Desh Paradesh, Bhagyale Jurayo, Kaida, Jiwandaan, Dadagiri, Maile Bhulnai Sakina, Achanak, Dui Mutu Ek Dhadkan, Aadhi Baato and Laxmi Rani.

Shakya had a cameo appearance in the 2016 Newari film Tuyumati. He also appeared in Yatra: A musical vlog. He then appeared in Password (2019).

Year	Title	Role
1994	Pahilo Prem	
1994	Janma Janma	Amar
1994	Prem Puja	
1994	Saubhagya	
1995	Karja	
1995	Simana	Karan
1997	Desh Pardesh	
1997	Jameen	
1997	Jun Tara	
1997	Rajkumar	
2001	Daag	
2001	Kaidi	
2001	Maya Baiguni	
	Krodh	
2019	Yatra: A musical vlog	
2002	Baacha Bandhan	
	Bhisma Pratigya	
2019	Password	
