= Vigilante 3D =

- Directed by: Dipendra K Khanal
- Screenplay by: Shan Basnyat
- Produced by: Dipendra K Khanal; Sushma Adhikari; Rajendra Adhikari
- Starring: Subash Thapa; Priyanka Karki; Menuka Pradhan; Raj Ghimire; Shankar Acharya
- Cinematography: Purushottam Pradhan
- Edited by: Dirgha Khadka
- Release dates: April 5, 2013 (Kathmandu, Nepal)
- Country: Nepal
- Language: Nepali
- Budget: रु 1.00 Crore

Farid 3D (Nepali: भिजिलान्ते) is a 2013 Nepali social thriller film Directed and Produced by Dipendra K Khanal and written by Shan Basnyat starring Subash Thapa, Priyanka Karki, Raj Ghimire, Menuka Pradhan and Sikha Shahi. The movie is recognized as the first 3D Nepali film but due to technical issues, the film had a limited 3D release. Most of the shooting for the movie was done in different locations of Kathmandu and Nuwakot. The movie had a budget of 1 crore out of which 20 lac was for the 3D camera alone.

== Plot outline ==
Vigilante is a movie about lust, love, friendship, and betrayal where a road trip of 6 people (3 guys and 3 girls) turns into a mishap as they have to stay near the riverbank due to some problem with one of the bikes. Group tries to have some fun meanwhile but one person goes missing in the night.

== Soundtrack ==
- The film features a soundtrack titled "Vigilante 3D OST" sung by Sabin Rai.

No.	Title	Singer(s)	Length
1.	"Vigilante 3D OST"	Sabin Rai	4:15

== Release ==
Release date of Vigilante 3D was postponed due to complications on the 3D technology which required more time to complete the movie. The movie was released on April 5, 2013 in limited theaters which supported 3D technology.

== Reception ==
The film received mixed reviews. National Daily 'Nagarik mentioned that the movie is worth watching, and The Himalayan Times noted that the screenplay had some loopholes but the story was presented with intrigue and suspense. The Himalayan Times reviewed the movie favorably, noting that Shan Basnyat's screenplay was a "satisfactory job with a few loopholes though" and that director Khanal narrated the story with intrigue and suspense, deriving fears in his audience."
