= Gaden Choeling Nunnery =

Tibetan Buddhist vihara

Coordinates: 32.236°N 76.326°E

Ganden Choeling Nunnery or Geden Chöling (Wylie: dga' ldan chos gling dgon pa) is a Tibetan Buddhist vihara for Buddhist nuns in Dharamshala, India. It is near the monastery in which the 14th Dalai Lama resides.

The Gaden Choeling Nunnery was started by nuns who fled from Nechung Ri vihara (Wylie: ne phyung ri) in Tibet, which was destroyed during the Cultural Revolution. It is the largest and oldest Tibetan nunnery in India. Since most of the nunneries in Tibet are no longer operational, it may be the largest in the world.

Gaden Chöling is built on a steep hillside in Dharamsala. The nunnery is only a ten-minute walk from the main temple in McLeod Ganj. There are 160 nuns in residence.

== Gaden Choeling Nunnery in Garzê Tibetan Autonomous Prefecture ==
Another nunnery with the same name is located in Garzê Tibetan Autonomous Prefecture (originally Kham, Tibet). Ten bhikṣunis from this monastery were initially involved in the 2008 Tibetan unrest.

== Notable nuns ==
- Passang Lhamo
