= The Man from Kathmandu =

2019 Nepalese movie

- Film poster
- Directed by: Pema Dhondup
- Written by: Pema Dhondup
- Produced by: Nakim Uddin
- Starring: Gulshan Grover; Hameed Sheikh; Anna Sharma; Karma Shakya; Neer Shah; Mithila Sharma; Paramita RL Rana
- Cinematography: Carlos Medina
- Edited by: Eric Karkhek
- Production company: Tricity Studios
- Release date: 15 March 2019
- Country: Nepal
- Language: English
- Budget: रू 50,000,000

The Man from Kathmandu is the first English-language Nepalese film, directed and written by Pema Dhondup. The film is Dhondup's second feature film and features Gulshan Grover, Hameed Sheikh, Jose Manuel, Anna Sharma, Michael Brian, Karma Shakya, Neer Shah, Mithila Sharma.

== Plot ==
Faisal, an American-Nepali boy of mixed Hindu and Muslim background living in Los Angeles, stops by Kathmandu on his way to join his father in the Syrian civil war fighting for the Islamic State. In Kathmandu, he reunites with his childhood sweetheart Namrata. Faisal's grandfather Suresh, who is assisting Namrata with a refugee camp after a major earthquake, comes into conflict with mob boss Abu, who wants the land occupied by the camp. Faisal ends up having to avenge his grandfather's murder at the hands of Sher Thapa, Abu's henchman, amid plots by Pundit Harvashdam.

== Cast ==
- Jose Manuel as Faisal Mustafa
- Gulshan Grover as Abu Mia Siddiqi
- Hameed Sheikh as Pundit Harvashdam
- Anna Sharma as Namrata
- Karma Shakya as Sher Thapa
- Neer Shah as Suresh Bhandari
- Shisheer Bangdel as Praveen Kumar
- Mithila Sharma as Renu Bhandari
- Paramita RL Rana as Sujata
- Abhisek Baniya "Nasty" as himself
- Yama Buddha as himself

== Production ==
Hameed Sheikh was recruited for the project by director Pema Dhondup and auditioned for his role via Skype. Gulshan Grover starred in the film in part due to his friendship with Dhondup and in part because a delay in his other projects allowed him to participate in The Man from Kathmandu.

Filming began in November 2017; according to producer Nakim Uddin, 90% of the film was planned to be shot in Nepal. By January 2018, filming in Kathmandu had been completed, with remaining shooting taking place in Los Angeles. The Nepal Tourism Board assisted with the film's production.

The film's budget was रू 50,000,000. (Note: Originally reported in 2017 as रू 30,000,000.) It was the first English-language film produced in Nepal. According to Dhondup, he was inspired to create the film by a news article from CNN.

== Release ==
The trailer and film poster were released on 2 September 2018 at the Nepali National Convention in Chicago. Nakim Uddin stated prior to the film's release that in addition to being released to the streaming platform Netflix, the film was being actively marketed to studios for international distribution. The film, according to Dhondup, was aimed to "globalise a Nepali story," with the goal of achieving a theatrical release in 50 countries.

The film had its domestic release in Nepal on 15 March 2019.

== Reception ==
Abhimanyu Dixit, writing for The Kathmandu Post, gave the film a scathingly negative review, criticizing its depiction of Muslims and its clichéd plot. "The viewer—especially if you are a man or a woman from Kathmandu—is certain to be offended by the gross misrepresentation of your town, depressed by the lifeless plot, disconnected by one-dimensional characterisation, and angry at the filmmakers for thinking that Kathmandu residents are so naïve that they will pay to watch their own insult."

The film was shown on 20 screens domestically, more than most Nepali films, but audience attendance was relatively low. For its second week in theaters, the number of screens was cut to 5, with the film projected to barely recoup its budget.

== Soundtrack ==
No.	Title	Lyrics	Music	Singer(s)	Length
1.	"Aakasai Ghumera"	Jason Kunwar	Jason Kunwar	Nikita Shrestha, Jason Kunwar	4:12
2.	"Kathmandu's Finest"	Nasty	Nasty	Nasty, Yama Buddha	3:55
3.	"Kich Kichay Maya"	Sujendra D Karki	Sujendra D Karki	Chandan Dhoj KC	4:10
4.	"Kathmandu"	Rohit John Chettri	Rohit John Chettri	1974 AD	3:56
