= Parastree =

2023 Nepalese film

- Directed by: Suraj Pandey
- Written by: Suraj Pandey
- Produced by: Sharmila Pandey; Pusparaj Neupane
- Starring: Gaurav Bista; Shilpa Maskey; Koshish Chhetri
- Production companies: D.S. Digital; Nendi Creation
- Distributed by: D.S. Digital; Nendi Creation
- Release dates: 30 June 2023 (Nepal & India)
- Countries: Nepal; India
- Languages: Nepali; Hindi

Parastree (Nepali: परस्त्री) is an Indo-Nepali film, directed by Suraj Pandey under the banner of D.S. Digital and Nendi Creation, produced by Sarmila Pandey, and co-produced by Pusparaj Neupane. The film was released on June 30, 2023. It features Shilpa Maskey, Koshish Chhetri, Gaurav Bista, Alisha Chhetri and other actors.

== Synopsis ==
Parastree is a dark thriller story occurring after an extra marital affair.

== Cast ==
Cast of Parastree

- Gaurav Bista
- Koshish Chhetri
- Shilpa Maskey
- Alisha Chhetri
- Aashant Sharma
- Rambabu Regmi
- Saraswati Adhakari
- Jhaken BC
- Arpit Neupane

== Release ==
The movie was released on June 30, 2023, across Nepal and India. The movie collected 1 lakhs 56 thousand on first day of its release.
