= Chapali Height 2 =

2016 Nepali film directed by Dipendra K Khanal

- Theatrical Poster
- Directed by: Dipendra K Khanal
- Produced by: Arjun Kumar
- Starring: Amrit Thapa; Paramita RL Rana; Mariska Pokharel
- Cinematography: Niraj Kadel
- Edited by: Dirgha Khadka
- Music by: Arjun Kumar
- Production company: Arjun Kumar Films
- Release date: 2016
- Running time: 115 minutes
- Country: Nepal
- Language: Nepali

Chapali Height 2 is a Nepali psychological thriller film directed by Dipendra K. Khanal and produced by Arjun Kumar. The film stars Avash Shrestha, Paramita Rana and Mariska Pokharel. It is the sequel to the 2012 film Chapali Height.

== Plot ==
Abhiman Jung Shahi is a rich and spoiled man whose lifestyle revolves around casual sex. He decides to change his promiscuous ways when he falls in love with Aakriti (Mariska). After much persuasion, Aakriti is impressed with the change in his behaviour and starts dating him. Their relationship deteriorates when Abhiman begins seeing his former girlfriend Nisha Joshi (Paramita).

== Cast ==
- Ayushman Joshi as Abhiman Jung Shahi
- Paramita Rana as Nisha Joshi
- Mariska Pokharel as Aakriti Thapa
- Rear Hang Rai as Bullet
- Muna Gauchan as Ruby
- Jeet Bahadur Tong as Banjhakri
- Laxmi Purai as Mata
- Meghana Choudhary as Dancer Girl
- Sunil Basnet as Aviman's Father

== Soundtrack ==
No.	Title	Lyrics	Music	Singer(s)	Length
1.	"Galti garau na"	Suresh Rai	Arjun Kumar	Dharmendra Sewan	3:55
2.	"Muskaan Timro"	Suresh Rai	Arjun Kumar	Santosh Lama	5:02
Total length:					5:57

== International release ==
The film was released in Australia on 18 August 2016.
