= We're No Monks =

- Directed by: Pema Dhondup
- Written by: Pema Dhondup
- Produced by: Pema Dhondup; Rupin Dang; Yangchen Dolkar
- Starring: Tsering Dorjee; Gulshan Grover; Sonam Phuntsok
- Release date: 2004
- Running time: 129 Minutes
- Country: India
- Language: Tibetan

We're No Monks is a 2004 Tibetan-language Indian drama film, directed and written by Pema Dhondup (his first feature film as a director). The film is produced by Pema Dhondup, Rupin Dang, and Yangchen Dolkar under the banner of Clear Mirror Pictures, and Wilderness Films India Limited. The film stars Tsering Dorjee, Gulshan Grover, and Sonam Phuntsok in the lead roles.

== Plot ==
Four friends in Dharamsala go on a religious mission but their true selves are eventually revealed.

== Cast ==
- Tsering Dorjee as Pasanag
- Gulshan Grover as Shamsher Singh
- Sonam Phuntsok as Tsering
