= Mr. Virgin =

2018 Nepali comedy-drama film

- Theatrical release poster
- Directed by: Bisharad Basnet
- Starring: Bijay Baral; Chhulthim Dolma Gurung; Rabindra Jha; Kamal Mani Nepal; Gaurav Pahari; Mariska Pokharel; Bholaraj Sapkota; Srijana Subba
- Production company: World Wide Films
- Release date: 17 August 2018 (Nepal)
- Country: Nepal
- Language: Nepali

Mr. Virgin is a 2018 Nepali comedy-drama film, directed by Bisharad Basnet in his debut. The film revolves around three men in their mid-thirties, who seek to lose their virginity. The film features Bijay Baral, Chhulthim Dolma Gurung, Rabindra Jha, Kamal Mani Nepal, Gaurav Pahari, Mariska Pokharel, Bholaraj Sapkota, and Srijana Subba.

== Plot ==
Three men — Dhal Bahadur (Gaurav Pahari), Pavitra Prassad (Bijay Baral), and Kumar Kancha (Kamal Mani Nepal) — are in their mid-thirties. After Chumman Lal (Bholaraj Sapkota) jokes about them still being virgins, they set out to lose their virginity. While searching for girls, they go to Thamel where they meet Pyasi Mohan (Rabindra Jha), a taxi driver, who takes advantage of them.

== Cast ==
- Bijay Baral as Pavitra Parsad
- Chhulthim Dolma Gurung
- Rabindra Jha as Mohan
- Kamal Mani Nepal as Kumar
- Gaurav Pahari as Dal Bahadur
- Mariska Pokharel as Roji
- Bholaraj Sapkota as Chumman Lal
- Srijana Subba

== Production ==
Before playing her role as an escort, actress Mariska Pokharel researched the daily life and lifestyle of call girls. Pokharel said that there were actresses who turned down the role because of the title of the film. She told The Kathmandu Post, "But I found the project compelling and couldn't wait to get started". The film marked the debut for the director Bisharad Basnet.

== Soundtrack ==
Original Motion Picture Soundtrack
No.	Title	Lyrics	Music	Singer(s)	Length
1.	"Tulki"	Suraj Pandit	Suraj Pandit	Suraj Pandit	4:21
2.	"Paisa Phek Tamasha Dekh"	Turist Jung BK	Mr. RJ	Sashi Rawal, Mr. RJ	4:27

== Critical reception ==
The Kathmandu Post reported that the film received public criticism for its suggestive title. Gaurav Pahari, the lead actor, responded that notwithstanding its name, the film was not vulgar. He said: "We have tried to explore sexuality and psychology in the film. But just because we have taken a new approach doesn't mean that the film is in anyway vulgar. Experimental yes, but not vulgar. We are hoping to break new ground by bringing what might be Nepal's first sex comedy to screen".

Shashwat Pant of Onlinekhabar wrote, "For a comedy movie, Mr. Virgin does not make the audience laugh. Its inappropriate jokes and clichéd dialogue makes the audience cringe throughout the two hours. Overall the movie is a poor watch".
