= Arjun Kumar =

Nepalese music director, singer and film producer

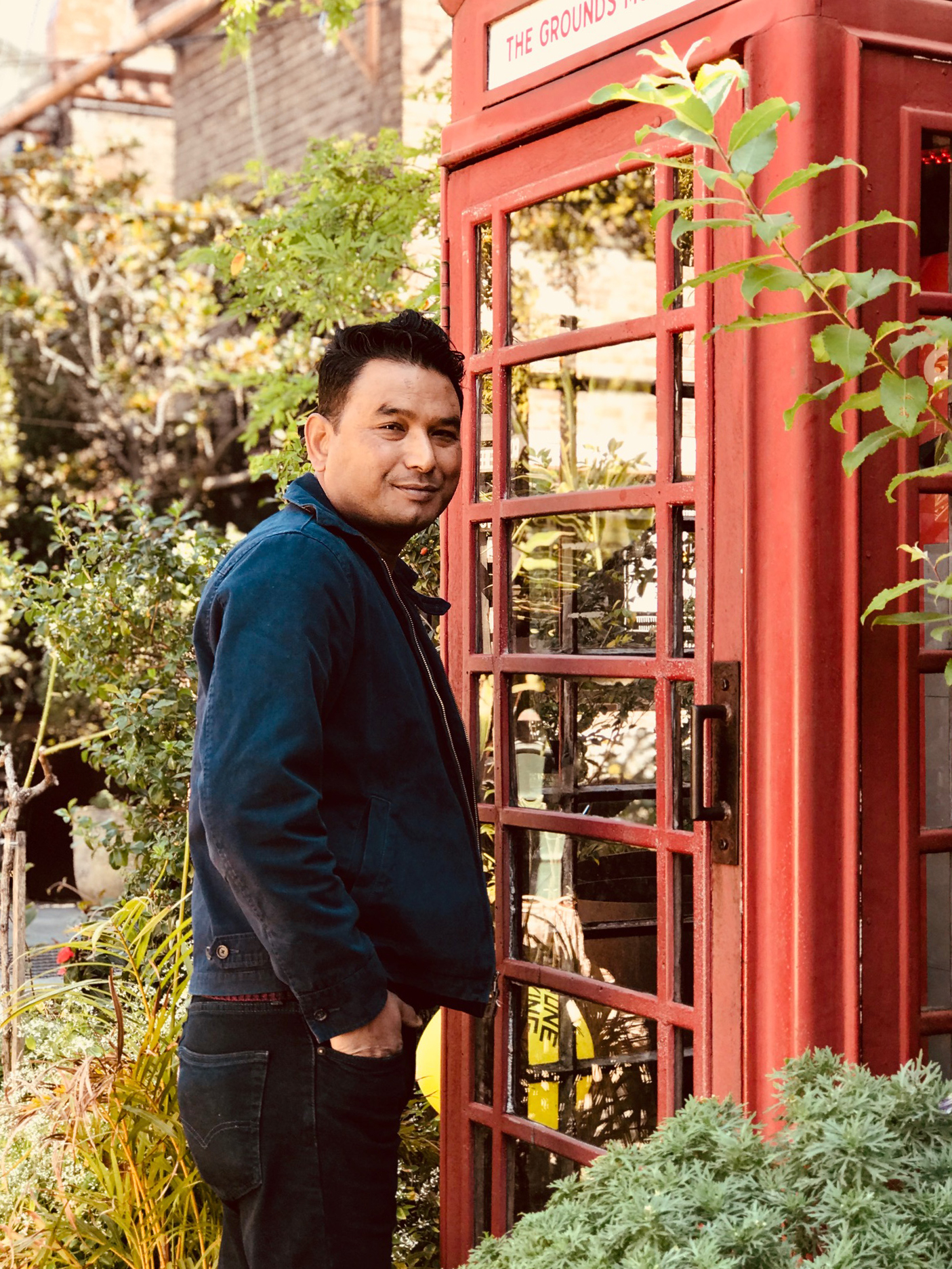
- Born: Arjun Kumar Dangol; 27 July 1970 (age 55); Trishuli, Nuwakot
- Occupations: Producer, music director, singer
- Years active: 1996 –

Arjun Kumar (Nepali: अर्जुन कुमार) is a Nepalese music director, singer and film producer. His career started in 2008 as music director from film The Yug Dekhi Yug Samma and as a film producer from film Chapali Height.

== Music albums ==
- Roje timilai
- Hridaya
- Passion
- Caliber (2007)

== Filmography ==
Key
†	Denotes films that have not yet been released

Year	Film	Note
2008	The Yug Dekhi Yug Samma	as music director
2012	Chapali Height	producer and music director
2014	Fitkiri	producer and music director
2016	Chapali height 2	producer and music director
2017	Fateko Jutta	producer and music director
2019	Chapali Height 3†	producer and music director
