= Himalaya (film) =

1999 film by Éric Valli

- Theatrical release poster
- Directed by: Éric Valli
- Written by: Jean-Claude Guillebaud; Éric Valli; Louis Gardel
- Produced by: Christophe Barratier; Jacques Perrin
- Starring: Tsering Dorjee; Thinle Lhondup; Gurgon Kyap; Lhakpa Tsamchoe
- Music by: Bruno Coulais
- Production company: Galatée Films
- Distributed by: Kino International
- Release date: 13 September 1999 (U.S.)
- Running time: 108 minutes
- Country: Nepal
- Languages: Dolpo, Nepali, German
- Budget: $4.4 million
- Box office: $40.1 million

Himalaya: Caravan (French: Himalaya: L'Enfance d'un chef) is a 1999 Nepali film directed by Éric Valli and was funded by corporations based in France. It was the first Nepalese film to be nominated in the Best Foreign Film category at the 72nd Academy Awards.

The film is a narrative on both the traditions and the impermanent nature of human struggle to retain and express power in the face of the gods. "The gods' triumph" is the call that echoes at the end of the film and expresses the balancing of karmic destinies. The extreme environment of the Himalayas is magnificently contrasted to the delicacy of humanity and the beauty of Tibetan culture.

The film depicts not only the life style of the upper Dolpo people of the mid western uphills of Nepal but also their traditional customs, for example celestial burial.

== Plot ==
Himalaya is a story set against the backdrop of the Nepalese Himalayas. At an altitude of five thousand meters in the remote mountain region of Dolpa, Himalaya tells the story of villagers who take a caravan of yaks across the mountains, carrying rock salt from the high plateau down to the lowlands to trade for grain.

At the beginning of the film, Lhakpa, the heir to the chieftainship of the tribe, is revealed to have died in a botched attempt to navigate a shortcut.

An annual event, the caravan provides the grain that the villagers depend on to survive the winter. The film unfolds as a story of rivalry based on misunderstanding and distrust between the aging chief, Tinle, and the young daring herdsman, Karma, who is both a friend and a rival to the chief's family as they struggle for leadership of the caravan. The elders of the tribe assert that Karma should lead the caravan in the absence of Lhakpa, but Tinle objects and insists that someone else should lead the caravan.

Karma, seeking to prove himself as a worthy leader, departs a few days before the scheduled departure of the caravan, leaving behind only the youngest and oldest members of the tribe. Karma's relatives plead with him not to leave, as leaving before the scheduled departure of the caravan would be seen as deceitful. Karma does not heed this warning, and soon the elders of the tribe congregate to determine which households still have remaining salt. Tinle decides to lead the remainder of the community in a caravan with the remaining salt, recruiting his monastic son, Norbou, to join his endeavors, on the original set day of departure. Tinle soon catches up with Karma's caravan, despite Karma having taken a shortcut and having left days earlier. Tinle asserts his leadership, and Karma acts as a role model to Tinle's grandson Tserin. Tinle predicts an oncoming snowstorm and immediately commands the caravan to depart, which Karma refutes as the sky is clear. Karma stays behind as Tinle and the rest of the caravan depart.

When the snowstorm sets in, Tinle grows weary and exhausted, and in ensuring that the caravan remains a cohesive unit, Tinle collapses in the snow. Karma arrives, having realized his mistake, and carries Tinle to the front of the caravan. The caravan is successful in reaching a landmark and survives the snowstorm, but Tinle collapses at the landmark, asking to be left to die. The leaders of the caravan agree, indicating that Tinle, as masters of the mountains, should honor his wishes to peacefully pass away in the mountains rather than the flatlands.

The film ends with Tinle's monastic son, Norbou, honoring the legacy of Tinle by painting a monastery wall with the caravan's adventures.

== Characters ==
- Thinle Lhondup as Tinle
- Lhakpa Tsamchoe as Pema
- Gurgon Kyap as Karma
- Karma Tensing Nyima Lama as Norbou
- Karma Wangel as Passang
- Jampa Kasang Tamang as Jampa
- Tsering Dorjee as Rabkie
- Labrang Tundup as Labrang
- Rabke Gurung as Tundup
- Pemba Bika as Tensing

== Production ==
Himalaya was shot in widescreen over nine months on location in a region that can only be reached on foot, with all but two characters played by real chiefs, lamas and local villagers. Director Éric Valli had lived in Nepal since 1983 and is also a photographer and author. His work is regularly published in National Geographic Magazine, GEO magazine and Life magazines.

The film was mostly produced by Galatée Films with input from UK based documentary producer Antelope and Swiss based Les Productions JMH.

== Reception ==
It has a Metacritic score of 73, with mostly positive reviews.

SBS gave the film 3.5/5, saying that "The story of Himalaya is a timeless one. French director Eric Valli tells it like a legend, and it's one he knows well", and that it is "It's a simple but quite affecting saga".

In 1999, the film won the Grand Prix for Best Film at Film Fest Gent.

The film grossed $10 million from 1.6 admissions in its first month of release in France.

== See also ==
- Himalayan salt
- Tibet-Nepal salt trade route
- The Saltmen of Tibet
