= Agastya: Chapter 1 =

2024 Nepali film

- Poster
- Directed by: Saurav Chaudhary
- Written by: Saurav Chaudhary
- Starring: Saugat Malla; Najir Husen; Nischal Basnet; Malika Mahat; Bijay Baral
- Cinematography: Sanjay Lama
- Edited by: Nimesh Shrestha
- Release date: 1 March 2024
- Running time: 160 minutes
- Country: Nepal
- Budget: NPR 3.5 crore
- Box office: 2.6 crore (within 4 weeks)

Agyasta: Chapter 1 is a 2024 Nepali action thriller film directed by Saurav Chaudhary under the banner of Dark Horse Entertainment and Seven Seas Entertainment. Released on 1 March 2024, the film stars Saugat Malla, Najir Husen, Nischal Basnet, Pramod Agrahari, Malika Mahat, and Bijay Baral.

== Cast ==
- Saugat Malla as Shaurya
- Najir Husen
- Nischal Basnet
- Pramod Agrahari as Tripathi
- Malika Mahat
- Bijay Baral and more.

== Release ==
The film was released on 1 March 2024, in Nepal.

== Box office collection ==
This films collected around 2.6 crores.
