= Anna Sharma =

Nepalese film actress

Annapurna Sharma
- अन्नपूर्ण शर्मा
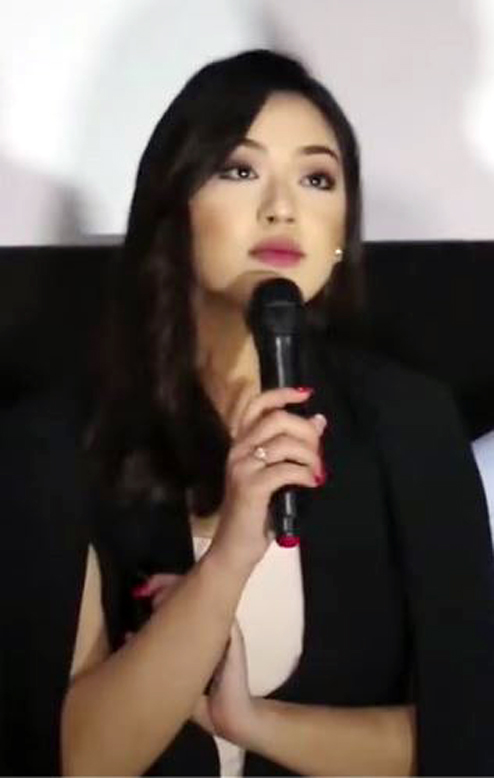
- Sharma at promotion of film Gangster Blues
- Born: Annapurna Sharma; May 24, 1998 (age 28); Kathmandu, Nepal
- Citizenship: Nepal
- Occupations: Actress, model
- Years active: 2014–present
- Notable work: Jerryy, Gangster Blues, The Man From Kathmandu

Annapurna Sharma, known professionally as Anna Sharma (Nepali: आना शर्मा; born 24 May 1998), is a Nepalese film actress who debuted in the Nepali film industry with the 2014 romantic drama Jerryy. She gained early recognition for her performance alongside Anmol K.C., and the film was both a critical and commercial success.

Sharma has since appeared in films such as Gangster Blues (2017) and The Man from Kathmandu (2019). Her roles have generally focused on romantic and dramatic themes, and she has been noted for her screen presence and nuanced performances.

== Personal life ==
Sharma is the daughter of show director, choreographer, and pageant coach Rachana Gurung Sharma. She has two sisters, Amilia Sharma and Ahliya Sharma.

In interviews, Sharma has reflected on her acting journey, noting that although her debut in Jerry came with little struggle, she later realised the importance of developing experience and skills in the industry. She has described her growth as an actor as shaped by both positive and difficult experiences.

She considers her role in Maya Ko Maya a personal milestone, highlighting a 17-minute scene where she portrayed the same character at different ages. She has shown interest in working on complex characters and has expressed admiration for actors like Saugat Malla and directors such as Sanjay Leela Bhansali.

Following a break after her 2019 film The Man from Kathmandu, Sharma returned with Aktor: Take 1, which she described as a significant project. She has stated that she plans to work on more films and also pursue business ventures related to the glamour industry.

== Career ==
Anna Sharma debuted with the film Jerryy opposite Anmol K.C. Her second film was Gangster Blues opposite Aashirman DS Joshi. Her third, The Man from Kathmandu, featured a cast of international and Nepalese actors including Gulshan Grover, Hameed Sheikh, Jose Manuel, Michael Brian, Karma Shakya, Neer Shah, and Mithila Sharma.

== Filmography ==
Year	Film	Role	Notes	
2014	Jerryy	Akanshya	Debut film	
2017	Gangster Blues	Aarzoo		
2016	The Man from Kathmandu	Namrata	Nepal's first web series	
2025	AKTOR †		Rajan Bhusal	Upcoming movie

== Awards ==
Year	Award	Category	Nominated work	Result
2014	NEFTA Film Awards	Best Debut Actor, Female	Jerryy	Won
