= The Break Up (2019 film) =

- Theatrical release poster
- Nepali: द ब्रेकअप
- Directed by: Hem Raj BC
- Written by: Hem Raj BC
- Produced by: Hem Raj BC; Deepak Khatiwada; Renu Rana; Rupak Thapa
- Starring: Aashirman DS Joshi; Shilpa Maskey; Raymon Das Shrestha; Itchya Karki; Saroj Khanal; Sushmita Bomjan
- Cinematography: Narendra Mainali
- Edited by: Surendra Poudel
- Music by: Songs: Bishesh Pandey; Biraj Gautam; Background Scores: Rohit Shakya; Shailesh Shrestha
- Production company: BC Motion Pictures
- Release date: 1 March 2019
- Running time: 125 minutes
- Country: Nepal
- Language: Nepali

The Break Up (Nepali: द ब्रेकअप) is a Nepali romantic comedy movie directed by Hem Raj BC. featuring Aashirman DS Joshi and Shilpa Maskey in lead roles. The film was shot in Pokhara and Sydney. The film is a love story which revolves around two protagonists Aavishkar (Aashirman) and Sara (Shilpa) The performance of the lead actors and the cinematography of the movie was highly praised but the film got mixed reviews from the audience. One of the film's songs, "Aaja Hamro Bhet Bhako Dina", was a remake of the old version which was from the film, Jwala, starring Rajesh Hamal where Saroj Khanal had a special appearance in the song. The old version of the song was sung by Udit Narayan, Asha Bhosle, Sadhana Sargam and Kavita Krishnamurthy. The remake version went on to become a huge hit as well sung by Melina Rai and Biraj Gautam.

== Plot ==
Aavishkar is a paragliding pilot in Pokhara who just went through a bad breakup in the beginning of the movie. Aavishkar's cousin brother who is also a paragliding pilot, Biraj, tries to divert his mind by trying to hook him up with a someone else but fails and just then Aavishkar tells him about his plans for his further studies which is completing his Masters in Sydney. Biraj is not happy with his decision and tries to convince him to stay not just for him but also in order to handle their paragliding business which they had built together. Aavishkar's father who is established as a Casanova in the movie, is also not happy with his decision but Aavishkar doesn't change his mind and is ready for a change of scene. Sara is a chef in America along with her cousin sister, Maya. They have a conversation stating that Sara is about to embark upon a world tour where she can travel, cook and learn new recipes all over the world. Not happy with Sara's decision, Sara's mother and father who are established as very conservative, try to convince her to stay but Sara is a very strong headed modern girl who makes her own decision and still plans on leaving for her tour. Her first stop his Sydney where her suitcase gets exchanged with Aavishkar. Their first encounter is at the airport where they have a fight. Aavishkar who is staying at his other cousin brother, Amosh's apartment, asks if he can find him a job. Amosh sends Aavishkar to wash dishes at a restaurant where Sara also works. Aavishkar starts ragging her by messing up the food she made for the customers and eventually loses his job. Sara quits as well and that his how they bond. Aavishkar starts falling for her and proposes. Sara rejects the proposal and that is how they end up being friends with benefits. Things start to get serious and they fall for each other which is why Sara decides to end things. Aavishkar returns to Pokhara and focuses more on his career and starts having flings with girls whereas Sara has a difficult time moving on. Later on, we find out that the cousins of the main protagonists, Biraj and Maya opt for arrange marriage. There is a big mix up in the wedding where Aavishkar thinks Biraj is about to marry Sara and Sara thinks that Maya is about to marry Aavishkar. The confusion is resolved and at the end of the movie there is a party held for friends and family where Sara gets jealous of Aavishkar's flings and confesses her feelings to him. Aavishkar in shock doesn't know how to reply. Sara takes a boat in Fewataal and leaves the party. Suddenly a storm hits the lake so Aavishkar goes to save Sara. They manage to survive the storm and end up together right then Biraj proposes to Maya. The movie ends with a song and a happy ending.

== Cast ==
- Aashirman DS Joshi as Aavishkar, a graduate in hotel management and co-owner of a paragliding business in Pokhara
- Shilpa Maskey as Sara, a chef residing in the USA who decides to pursue her career in Sydney, Australia
- Raymon Das Shrestha as Biraj, Aavishkar's elder brother and co-owner of the paragliding business
- Itchya Karki as Maya, Biraj's fiance
- Saroj Khanal as Aavishkar's father
- Sushmita Bomjan as Aavishkar's mother

== Soundtrack ==
No.	Title	Singer(s)	Length
1.	"Aaja Hamro Bhet Bhako Dina"	Melina Rai, Biraj Gautam	4:02
2.	"Harpal"	Biraj Gautam	5:10
3.	"Gupchup"	Bikram Baral	4:24

== See also ==
- Aashirman DS Joshi
- Shilpa Maskey
- Melina Rai
