= Chhulthim Dolma Gurung =

Nepali actress

- Born: 8 September; Nepal
- Citizenship: Nepalese
- Occupations: Actress, producer, VJ, RJ, model

Chhulthim Dolma Gurung is a Nepalese actress who works in Nepali films. She ventured into acting in The movie ‘November Rain’ as A character "Dalli" which was released on 24 April 2014. For the former film, she won NFDC National Film Awards 2015, 8th NEFTA Film Awards in 2015 And Dcine Awards 2015 in the category of 'The Best Actor in a Supporting Role (Female)'.

== Filmography ==
Year	Film	Character	Director	Note
2014	November Rain	Dalli	Dinesh Raut	Won The Best Debut Actor Award in NFDC National Film Awards 2015, 8th NEFTA Film Awards2015 & Dcine Awards2015
2017	Diarry		Anil Yonjan	
2017	Mero Paisa Khoi		Rose Rana	
2018	Nepte		Dev Kumar Shrestha	
2018	Mr. Virgin		Bisharad Basnet	
2019	Na Yeta Na Uta		Bisharad Basnet Miraz Roshan	
2019	Password		Samrat Basnet	
