= Suntali =

2014 Nepali black-comedy film

- Theatrical release poster
- Nepali: सुन्तली
- Directed by: Bhaskar Dhungana
- Produced by: Bhaskar Dhungana; Jaya Shah; Prachanda Shrestha
- Starring: Priyanka Karki; Karma Shakya; Sushma Karki; Bipin Karki; Pramod Agrahari
- Narrated by: Madan Krishna Shrestha
- Cinematography: Andra Belisiya
- Production company: Blue Poppy Films
- Release date: October 2014 (Busan)
- Country: Nepal
- Language: Nepali

Suntali (Nepali: सुन्तली) is a 2014 Nepali black-comedy film, directed by Bhaskar Dhungana. The film is produced by Bhaskar Dhungana, Jaya Shah, and Prachanda Shrestha under the banner of Blue Poppy Films. It stars Priyanka Karki, Karma Shakya, Sushma Karki, Bipin Karki, and Pramod Agrahari. The film follows Suntali's relationship with Sundar.

== Plot ==
A matriarch of a village in Nepal, is arranging her son Sundar's wedding. Suntali, Sundar's old friend, comes to the village, and she rekindle their relationship. The matriarch starts a plan to destroy her.

== Cast ==
- Priyanka Karki as Suntali
- Karma Shakya as Sundar
- Sushma Karki as Buxom Babe
- Bipin Karki as Bidur
- Pramod Agrahari as Bajrang
- Madan Krishna Shrestha as narrator

== Release and reception ==
Suntali premiered at the 19th Busan International Film Festival in October 2014 on the Window on Asian Cinema category.

Abhimanyu Dixit of The Kathmandu Post wrote, "Dhungana proved that he was a proficient maker that too in his debut film". Sophia Pande of Nepali Times wrote, "Suntali is quite the pleasure for those of us who have cringed in the theaters while watching Nepali films in the past". Niranjan Kunwar of The Record wrote "Suntali is a simple, yet beautiful film. And it's the simplest beauty that can be the most powerful". The staff of Onlinekhabar wrote, "True to its form, Suntali combined these two to a certain degree of success. But the audience couldn't warm up to this as most failed to recognise the clever juxtaposition of these forms".

=== Awards and nominations ===
Year	Award	Category	Recipient	Result	Ref.
2017	Film Critics Society of Nepal	Best Actress	Priyanka Karki	Won	
2017	Film Critics Society of Nepal	Best Cinematographer	Ondrej Belica	Won	
