= Sangita Shrestha =

Nepalese film director (born 1976)

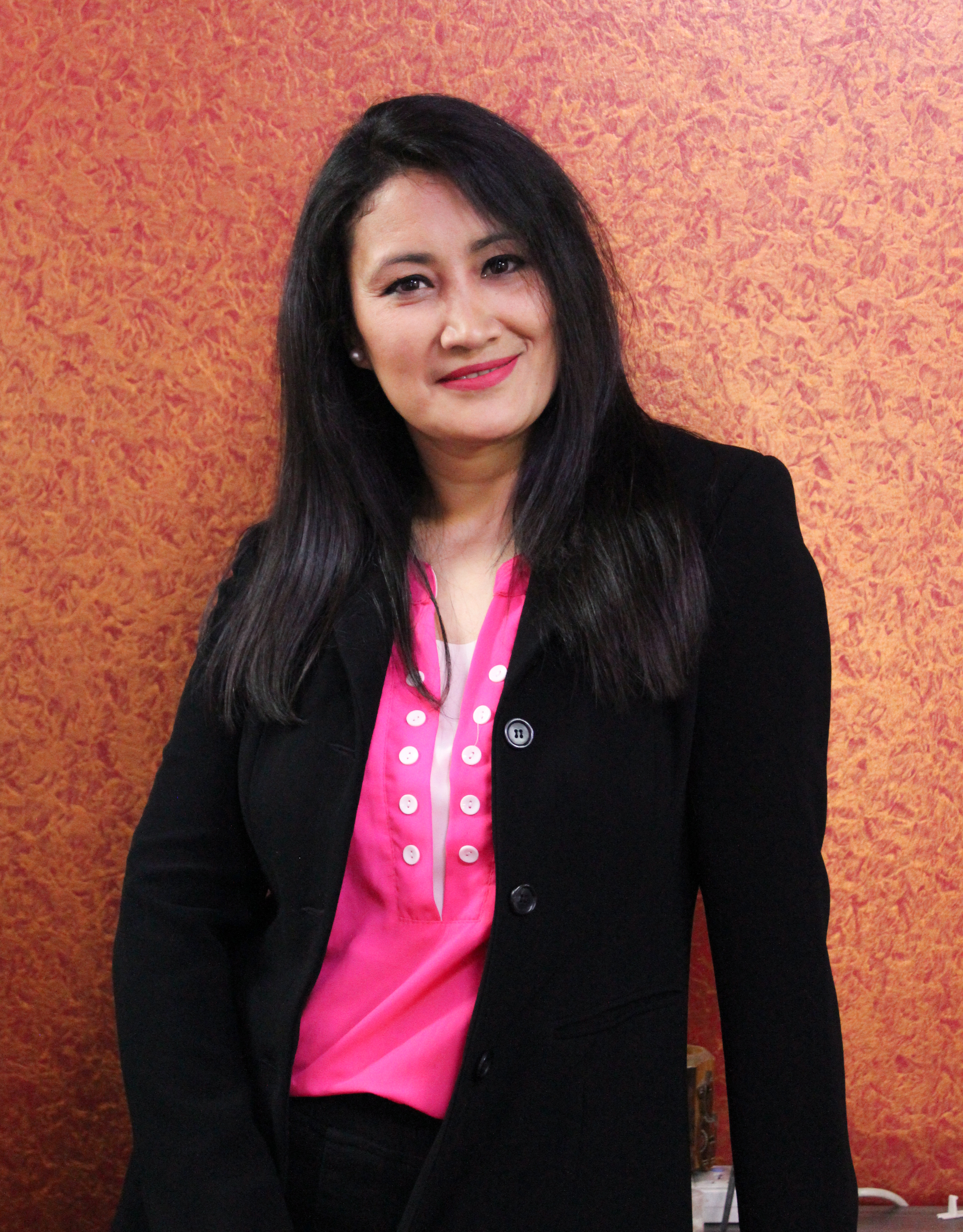
- Sangita Shrestha at KMG premises
- Born: Biratnagar, Nepal
- Occupations: Director, screenwriter, Media person
- Years active: 1998—present
- Notable work: Katha Premka short films series

Sangita Shrestha is a Nepalese film director, screenwriter and media presenter.

== Career ==
Shrestha started her career on radio, later becoming a VJ for Image Channel from 2000-2004 and then at Kantipur Television, hosting the show Music Mela. She began directing music videos and a series of short films. She has directed over 70 videos, but is best known for her short films series Katha Premka. She later based a book of short love stories on this series, Kathama Aljhiyeka Prem, released in 2016.

She appeared as a member of the jury panel for Miss Nepal 2016.

In 2018 she became a writer/director with a featured film Katha Kathmandu, based on the interconnected lives and relationships of three men living in Kathmandu.
