= Happy Days (2018 film) =

- Directed by: Milan Chams
- Written by: Yam Thapa
- Starring: Dayahang Rai; Priyanka Karki
- Release date: January 26, 2018
- Running time: 138 minutes
- Country: Nepal
- Language: Nepali
- Budget: रू2.5 crore (US$160,000)

Happy Days is 2018 Nepalese Drama action romance film directed by Milan Chams. The film stars Dayahang Rai, Priyanka Karki in the lead roles. Presented by BP Khanal, Happy Days tells a story about a girl who falls in love with two people.

== Plot ==
A guy who is desperate to go in London to settle with his life after finally going to London he starts to fall in love with a girl.

== Cast ==
- Dayahang Rai
- Priyanka Karki
- Sanjay Gupta
- Bikki Joshi
- Diya Poon
