= Mero Best Friend =

- Directed by: Prasanna Poudel
- Produced by: Prajita Poudel 'Bajracharya'
- Starring: Priyanka Karki; Resh Maratha; Diwas Upreity; Bimlesh Adhikari; Keki Adhikari
- Cinematography: Bidur Pandey
- Edited by: Surendra Poudel & Tekendra Shah
- Music by: Sugam Pokharel, Pramod Kharel & Rajan Raj Sivakoti
- Release date: 2012
- Country: Nepal
- Language: Nepali

Mero Best Friend is a Nepali romantic comedy movie based on the grounds of friendship and violence. The movie centers on the lives of two best friends played by Resh Maratha and Priyanka Karki. Originally Jharana Bajracharya was cast as the female lead but she was later replaced by Priyanka Karki. While this is Prasanna Poudel's second movie venture, Karki debuts into Kollywood with this movie. It also includes Bimlesh Adhikari and Keki Adhikari in a special appearance. The movie ‘MBF’ is made under Ashabadi Films banner, produced by Prajita Bajcharya. The story and the screenplay is written by Achyut Adhikari. The music composers are Sugam Pokhrel, Rajanraj Shivakoti, Ashusen Lama, and Pramod Kharel. The lyrics of the songs are written by Bhupendra Khadka, Harihar Acharya, and Ahsusen Lama. Action by Himal KC, editing by Surendra Poudel & Tekendra Shah, and cinematography by Late Bidur Pandey.

The first look of the movie was released on April 1, 2012.
