= Chapali Height =

- Theatrical release poster
- Directed by: Dipendra K Khanal
- Produced by: Arjun Kumar
- Starring: Binita Baral Aamir Gautam Raj Ghimire
- Cinematography: Niraj Kandel
- Edited by: Dirgha Khadka
- Music by: Arjun Kumar
- Production company: Ashma Films
- Release date: 16 March 2012
- Country: Nepal
- Language: Nepali
- Budget: रु 85 lakhs
- Box office: रु 3.5crore

Chapali Height is a 2012 Nepali erotic psychological thriller film featuring Amir Gautam, Raj Ghimire and Binita Baral. It was shot in the Chapali Height area in Kathmandu.

The movie, directed by Dipendra K Khanal and financed by Arjun Kumar, was shot in 25 days. It is based on the story of a girl (Binita) living in a hostel in Pokhara, and two guys who fall in love with her. The film received mixed to positive response from critics and audience for its dark theme, background score and actors' performances. It was the second biggest blockbuster of the year behind Nischal Basnet's LOOT .

== Plot ==
Amir and Bineeta come from Pokhara to live in Raj's house at Chapali Height, but the relationship between Amir and Bineeta sours and an accident occurs.

Amir starts thinking that Binee is attracted towards Raj. An incident happens where Binee encourages Raj to imagine her as his beloved and kiss her. Amir witnesses this scene, gets angry, and leaves. Binee, understanding that Amir is angry with her, follows her. Amir says that he is fed up with Binee for almost kissing Raj. Binee, in return, says that she was just role-playing kissing Raj. Amir leaves Binee in the night in Raj's house and vows never to return.

Binee wakes up in the morning just to find that Amir is no longer there. She cries and tries to kill herself. Raj saves her with a kiss. Binee begins her life without Amir. Raj tries to persuade Binee that he loves her more dearly than Amir does. Raj organizes a party where the only guests are Binee and Raj, and he proposes to Binee. Raj convinces Binee that whatever happened was the part of life and she should accept this and move ahead. Binee accepts the reality that Amir left her, along with Raj's proposal of marriage.

Binee finds Raj and Amir together with her in bed. Raj and Amir disclose their past to Binee: they were very, very good childhood friends, each liking whatever the other liked. When they grew up, their parents separated them, forcing Raj to move to Chapali Height, leaving Amir behind in Pokhara. They reveal that they still love each other and want to share everything they have with each other as in their childhood, including Binee. Binee tells them that they are sick and they need a doctor. Binee tries to call the police, but Raj and Amir stop her.

In the later scene, we see Raj and Amir making a plan to either persuade Binee to live with them together and enjoy it or they must kill her, otherwise, their truth would be known to the world. Binee remembers how her father said to her that she is his pride and remembers her childhood vow that she would never lessen his prestige in the society. She cries at how she betrayed her father's trust, and vows in her heart to expose the truth of Raj and Amir.

Raj and Amir try their best to persuade Binee to forget everything and live with them together. They untie Binee and Binee in return makes them believe that she has accepted them. In the night, Binee tries to leave the house leaving behind a drunken Raj and Amir who are passed out. However, Raj awakes, knocks Binee out, and brings her back to the house. Binee knocks Raj out/down and flees the house.

Amir wakes up just to find that Binee has left and Raj has been knocked down and out. Amir catches Binee this time and asks why Binee is not understanding their love. Binee attacks Amir and flees the scene, leaving Amir unconscious. Raj wakes up just to find that Binee attacked Amir, possibly fatally, and chases Binee. Binee tries to flee the house, pursued by Raj. Realizing that Binee is not going to accept them, Raj tries to kill Binee. In the meantime, Amir awakens.

Binee finds herself trapped between Raj and Amir. Amir hits her badly, knocking her down. Binee falls to the ground. Raj and Amir come down from the roof to find that Binee is not on the ground any longer. She has already escaped. They vow to find Binee and kill her, just to hide their secret from the society. Binee kills Amir from her hiding place. However, Raj is still alive, and she fights for her life with Raj. In the battle symbolizing homophobic good and innocence vs. evil, the innocence of Binee wins and she is able to kill Raj as well. She digs a graveyard where she buries both Raj and Amir together in Chapali Height to symbolize their eternal friendship. The movie ends with Binee leaving the grave of Raj and Amirat at dawn, free to live her life again having killed her would-be husbands.

== Reception ==
Critics had mixed to negative responses in spite of its good collection in box office. The Kathmandu Post said it to be "plagued with stilted, artificial-sounding dialogues and wooden performances, this is one watch you probably wouldn’t mind missing." Republica commented the film as "a compilation of tasteless scenes." The Himalayan Times noted it to be the "height of nothingness."

There were some positive reviews as well, Manoj Pandit wrote twice about the movie and called it a good watch, which has all its elements at right place.

== Box office ==
Chapali Height had a decent opening at the box office. It collected around रू50 lakhs on the first day. Unofficial figures confirm the collection of रू70 lakhs on second day. But the movie ended up being the second-biggest hit of the year behind Nischal Basnet's LOOT. Its net collection at the box office is approx. रू3.5 crores(रू35 million rupees).

== Sequel ==
As sequel to the movie, Chapali Height 2 was made.
