= Éric Valli =

French photographer and film director

Éric Valli (born 1952, in Dijon, France) is a French photographer and film director.

Valli specializes in mountain scenery and is an expert on the Himalaya Mountains. In 1999 he directed the adventure film Caravan about survival in the Himalayas starring Thinle Lhondup which became the first Nepalese film to be nominated for a Best Foreign Film Award at the Oscars.

Valli has also shot a documentary with Diane Summers on the honey hunters of Nepal documenting honey hunting by the Gurung tribesmen of west-central Nepal. In it, they enter the jungle in search of wild honey where they use indigenous tools under precarious conditions to collect honey.

Valli has received three World Press Awards for his work Chasseurs de Miel (1988), Chasseurs des Ténèbres (1991) and Les enfants de la poussière (1991).
