= Environmental mega conferences =

The environmental movement has made considerable progress from the first Greenpeace protest involving six people and a boat in 1971, to the environmental conferences of today involving the world’s leaders and commanding global attention. Environmental mega conferences differ from small environmental and sustainability conferences in fundamental ways. Rather than focusing on specific regional problems such as acid rain or ‘sectoral’ problems such as human health or food, they try to take a synoptic overview of the relationship between human society and the natural world. They aim to; “firstly address the overall trajectory of human development and its relationship with the environment as a whole and secondly take a broader view of the complex environment and development issues over a longer time frame, as each summit is preceded by a number of pre-conferences”.

== History ==
There have been 4 environmental mega conferences to date; United Nations (UN) Conference on the Human Environment (UNCHE) 1972 (commonly known as the Stockholm conference); UN Conference on Environment and Development (UNCED) 1992 (also known as Rio Conference or Earth Summit); UN General Assembly Special Session on Sustainable Development in New York 1997 (Earth Summit II) and World Summit on Sustainable Development (WSSD) 2002 in Johannesburg.

Pressure for a global environmental mega conference had been building since the mid-1960s as cross boundary problems such as air and water pollution raised awareness of the need for international cooperation. This was emphasised by the first pictures of Earth taken from space. A Swedish representative first proposed the idea in 1968 at the Economic and Social Council Biosphere meeting hosted by the UN; Sweden at the time was under a lot of political domestic pressure to tackle the issue of acid rain and offered to host the proposed environmental mega-conference. Stockholm was the very first global meeting about a single issue; it was the first coordinated attempt to discuss an international issue at a global level. Since Stockholm, mega conferences have been held on many global issues such as health, women and human settlements. It was a groundbreaking advancement in this respect and provided a stage for future environmental mega conferences to set global agendas and provide global leadership.

== Media Exposure ==
Environmental mega conferences are large scale and high profile. They capture the attention of the world’s’ media due to the breadth of issues they cover and the notable stakeholders they attract. They command the headlines surrounding the event and allow environmental activists, non-governmental organizations (NGOs) and the public to apply domestic pressure on the outcomes as environmental issues take centre stage. The role of the media is important in setting global agendas. The time around these conferences allow the global media and governments to focus on strategic issues and link problems such poverty, health, environment and trade together by creating global debate and publicizing sustainability issues.

For conferences such as the WSSD (World Summit on sustainable Development), much of the media attention it received was focused on its failures rather than what it had achieved. This may be, in part, attributable to a lack of understanding as the public are arguably unfamiliar with the term ‘sustainable development’. Reporting on this topic is sporadic, almost non existent and any progress made (since the Rio conference in 1992 and the Brudtland report) is done so on to a backdrop of the sustainable development rhetoric.

These conferences have, to some extent, also become a focus for protests from a wide range of actors and activists who use the media coverage to highlight their own views. For example, thousands of demonstrators marched in Durban on 3 December 2011 at the annual UN conference on climate change, angered by the stance taken by rich countries such as Canada and America. This negative media spotlight affects business and NGO involvement too as ‘many of the potentially controversial partnerships [type II partnerships, see below], particularly those involving corporations, held their meetings on the outskirts of the Summit [World Summit on sustainable Development], fearing bad publicity’.

== Stakeholders and Partnerships ==
Environmental mega conferences have made efforts to challenge their ‘elitist and remote’ label by becoming more inclusive over time; increased inclusivity increases legitimacy. There is a wide range of stakeholders in attendance at these conferences. Along with well over 100 governments attending (at Rio 172 attended with 108 sending their head of state), nongovernmental organizations (NGOs) are present, businesses also send representatives together with major stakeholder groups representing; women, youth, indigenous people, local authorities, trade unions, farmers and scientific and technological communities. This formal participation process means these smaller stakeholder groups do not have to rely on unofficial ‘side events’ to provide a proxy input from global civil society.

Type I and type II partnerships were produced at WSSD. Type I referred to a series of legally binding intergovernmental commitments designed to aid states in the implementation of Sustainable Development Goals. Type II partnerships, are collaborations between national or sub-national governments, private sector actors and civil society actors who form voluntary transnational agreements in order to meet specific sustainable development goals; they challenge the traditional state centered eco-governmentality approach to tackling sustainable development. Hundreds of these alliances were announced at WSSD and this brought NGOs and business firmly into the spotlight of global environmental governance.

== Global North/South Divide ==
There are critics who state that these conferences provide new arenas in which old grievances about human consumption (in the North) and population growth (in the South) can be articulated with much greater clarity and volume. The UN Environmental Programme (UNEP) states that since Rio “there has been a steady decline in the environment. One of the key driving forces has been the growing gap between rich and poor". Existing political positions are polarised and not reconciled under the media spotlight.

One of the stated aims of the WSSD was ‘the reinvigoration of the global commitment to a North/South partnership and higher level of international solidarity and to the accelerated implementation of Agenda 21 and the promotion of sustainable development’ yet its impact on multilateralism was arguably negligible; overshadowed by the events of 9/11, the subsequent ‘War on Terror’ and American unilateralism. The WSSD was boycotted by George W. Bush, then the American president, who was on holiday at the time of the conference, and Tony Blair, then the British prime minister, attended for just one day. This apparent lack of interest of high-profile, global North world leaders does nothing to bridge the North/South divide, especially when conferences such as these potentially have great potential to do so. It also risks undermining the significance of such conferences and reduces the political credibility.

Furthermore, this ‘growing gap’ of inequality between the two global regions have been said to be highlighted by the type II partnership initiative. Partnerships must fulfill two essential criteria to be effective; mutuality- interdependence and equality between partners, and organizational identity- the equal maintenance of each partner’s missions and goals. However, in a type II partnership between Northern and Southern actors, the former will inevitably contribute greater financial and material resources to the partnership therefore creating a power inequality, enabling increased control and impairing the mutuality necessary for the partnership to function successfully. To counter this, it is necessary to ensure that a ‘contribution’ within a type II partnership can include knowledge, skills and other relevant strengths, rather than only financial and material resources, to redress the balance of power within the partnership.

== The Six Core Functions ==
Seyfang and Jordan (2002) have identified six core functions which these mega conferences seek to perform;

1. Setting global agendas
2. Facilitating ‘joined-up’ thinking
3. Endorsing common principles
4. Providing global leadership
5. Building institutional capacity
6. Legitimising global governance through inclusivity

Some are more successful than others as discussed below.

=== Setting global agendas ===
Through the aforementioned media attention surrounding these conferences and subsequent public debate and domestic political pressure, environmental issues have not only made it onto the global political agenda but have maintained their position there. They serve in uniting otherwise disconnected issues and UN is probably the only forum where global dimensions of common problems such as sustainable development can be adequately resolved. For example, the Stockholm conference (the first environmental mega conference) successfully identified the terms of reference of what is now a continuing global environmental debate and fused the simmering conflict between the environment and development.

=== Facilitating ‘Joined-up’ Thinking ===
Discussing interconnected issues of sustainable development problems on a global scale demands joined-up thinking. Mega conferences offer a forum outside normal short-term political agendas for governments and stakeholders to address wide ranging, integrated issues. In reality, this is difficult to achieve. Their huge scope and all encompassing agenda makes it impossible to “unpick the intricacies” of sustainable development issues and even in this arena, some aspects, such as trade, remain off the agenda (an issue addressed by the World Trade Organization and World Bank instead). Attempts to achieve joined-up thinking have increased progressively; the issues raised at Rio and Johannesburg were considerably more wide ranging than at Stockholm, arguably aided by the sustainable development discourse. However, in this quest for comprehensiveness, it is increasingly harder to pull specific issues into focus.

=== Endorsing Common Principles ===
Environmental mega conferences have been criticised as being little more than high profile, hugely expensive talking shops which give the illusion that the world is changing when it is not. They have produced so little concrete change due to the voluntary nature of the agreements, the difficulty in monitoring and the lack of follow up regarding compliance. However, they have produced important and authoritative ‘soft laws’, the halfway stage on the road to legally binding frameworks. There is the strong expectation of nations adhering to soft laws and that they will become ‘harder’ in the short or long term, more precise and more legally binding. For example, many principles agreed upon at the Stockholm conference now form the basis of national, regional and EU laws. This is not that surprising as Stockholm was the first of the mega conferences and was treading new territory; policy makers and governments, now that common principles have been established, are attempting to move onto more definitive detailed action plans.

=== Providing Global Leadership ===
Mega conferences provide a stage for global leadership. One of the best examples of this is the Agenda 21 agreement evolving from the Rio summit which gave a blueprint for action at lower levels of governance. The type II partnerships created at WSSD also demonstrate a strong ‘take home’ action plan carrying the weight of global agreement. However, it is questionable how well mega conferences adhere to the subsidiary principle (the idea that problems should be addressed at the lowest effective level of governance).

The EU, through the integration of the concept of sustainable development in internal and international policies and development strategy, has been able to offer leadership and ‘carry the sustainable development flag on the international scene'. Many have cited the EU as important actors in providing this leadership. The mega conferences forces the ‘EU policy to interact with other political structures and actors’ and the conversion of ‘soft laws’ into hard EU policies and laws demonstrates leadership that could be replicated in other areas of the world (for example, in the African Union); which would surely be a huge success for future environmental mega conferences.

=== Building Institutional Capacity ===
Past mega conferences addressing a range of issues have led to the creation of new institutional bodies such as the UN, UNEP and the Commission on Sustainable Development. Maurice Strong, who headed the Stockholm conference and an advocate of environmental mega conferences, believes that the ‘process is the policy’; that mega conferences are ‘one contribution to a much larger process of societal and institutional change, rather that one-off, isolated events’.

Despite the slow pace and continual frustrations that critics highlight, there is inexorable forward movement; they are important yardsticks which domestic pressure groups can use to maintain influence and conference after conference builds a cycle of ever increasing domestic commitment. However, there are criticisms that these new institutions are weak both financially and legally and calls have been made for them to be vested with far greater legal and administrative powers in order to function better as engines of sustainability.

==== National Governance ====
Actions taken at mega conferences indirectly build new institutional domestic capacity by creating domestic political opportunity structures. Policy makers are, for a short while, outside the normal constraints of short term political thinking and can consider other long term environmental issues. Type II partnerships formed at WSSD also put more emphasis on environmental action at the national and sub-national level. Along with the creation of new institutional processes, they offer a move away from global level governance and encourage states to provide a more comprehensive account of their own national sustainable development strategies.

For example, following the Stockholm conference (UNCHE) European leaders met in Paris at an environmental conference and regional inter-governmental meetings were also convened. Environmental mega conferences do not specifically generate national level governance but this was encouraged through the emphasis on the ‘commonality of national purpose’. It has been claimed that national environment ministries have gained the most from mega conferences of this nature.

=== Legitimizing Global Governance through Inclusivity ===
As discussed above, environmental mega conferences have a wide range of participants. Through this participation comes legitimacy as more people are involved with the decision making process and so buy into any decisions made. There are still criticisms that they fail to capture grassroots debate about sustainable development and that only the well resourced, large interest groups are able to attain a seat at the table with smaller groups remaining outside the formal decision-making process. Despite this the increased numbers of participants throughout the evolution of environmental mega conferences are encouraging. NGO involvement has grown from 134 in Stockholm (a tenth of which were from developing countries) to over 1400 in Rio (a third of which originated in developing countries).

Informal, ‘fringe’ discussions, external to the main event, also take place, with 17,000 attendees in Rio. They firstly help NGOs to appreciate their different perspectives and agendas and to confront the difficulties of collaboration across lines of language, culture, and wealth; and secondly, provide an international platform and stature for many organizations that are ignored, starved of resources, or actively oppressed in their countries. Finally, the internet is the new method for the expansion of public and stakeholder participation. In the buildup to Johannesburg, individuals could participate via websites such as the UK government’s Sustainable Development website. Rio+20 (to be held in 2012) has websites to which major groups and stakeholders can contribute and use to get involved in the preparatory process as well as links with Facebook and Twitter. In the UK, ‘e-petitions’ were launched in August 2011 which enable the public to create and sign online petitions on topics to be discussed in the House of Commons. This online community may well be used further in future to increase participation and therefore legitimacy.

== Uncertain future ==
The process of governing the global environment and its sustainability issues at a cooperative global level is arguably a romantic notion. It has been said that nations, policy makers and stakeholders are operating within a restrictive framework with incoherent internal policies. Further critics state that summits such as these painfully highlight inactivity and/or the inability to fundamentally change lives of the poor or act decisively on climate change.

It may be that environmental mega conferences have served their purpose in boosting environmental issues onto the global agenda and now voluntary, bi-laterally agreed partnerships and domestic policies can take the reins, rendering high level multilateral summits obsolete. On the other hand, advocates conclude that they still serve an important function in contemporary governance, even though they are not the panaceas that some had originally hoped they might be. Furthermore, if determined activists organise their campaign and demand to be heard, it is possible that this sort of pressure has the potential to keep the cycle of environmental mega conferences alive.
