= Lhakpa Tsamchoe =

Tibetan actress (born 1972)

- Born: Lhakpa Tsamchoe; 1972 (age 53–54); Bylakuppe, Karnataka, India
- Occupations: Actress, model
- Years active: 1997–present
- Height: 1.71 m (5 ft 7 in)
- Spouse: Michael Gregory (m. 2001)

Lhakpa Tsamchoe (born 1972) is a Tibetan actress from India. She is the first Tibetan woman ever to break into mainstream film; most famous for starring alongside Brad Pitt and David Thewlis in the 1997 Hollywood blockbuster Seven Years in Tibet, in which she played Pema Lhaki, a Tibetan tailor and wife of Austrian mountaineer, Peter Aufschnaiter.

== Career ==
In 1999, she starred in another French-made, American distributed Nepali adventure movie, Himalaya (French title: Himalaya – l'enfance d'un chef), in which she was one of the leading characters. In 2006, in the Indian film Milarepa set in the Spiti Valley close to the border between India, Pakistan, and Tibet, she played a supporting role as Aunt Peydon during the formative years of the famed protagonist, Milarepa (1052–1135), who is one of the most widely known Tibetan saints.

== Filmography ==
Year	Title	Role	Notes	Ref
1997	Seven Years in Tibet	Pema Lhaki	Hollywood	
1999	Himalaya	Pema	Tibetan (Nepal)	
2006	Milarepa	Aunt Peydon	Tibetan (India)	
