= Federation of Nepalese Chambers of Commerce and Industry =

- Abbreviation: FNCCI
- Formation: 1965; 61 years ago
- Type: Business association
- Legal status: Non-profit organization
- Location: Kathmandu, Nepal
- Key people: Anjan Shrestha (President)
- Staff: 60
- Website: www.fncci.org

Federation of Nepalese Chambers of Commerce and Industry (FNCCI) is the umbrella organization of Nepalese Chambers of Commerce and Industry. It was established in 1965 with the aim of promoting business and industry while protecting the rights and interests of business and industrial communities FNCCI has been playing a key role in promoting business and industry in the country. It provides, inter alia, information, advisory, consultative, promotional and representative services to business and government and organises training / workshop / seminar on a regular basis. FNCCI is Federation of Nepalese Chambers of Commerce and Industry.

== Organizational structure ==
The highest policy making body of the FNCCI is its General Assembly which generally meets on an annual basis. The activities and functions of the FNCCI are planned and managed by the Executive Committee consisting of 74 members including President and 5 nominated members who have tenure of three years (As per the Fifth amendment of FNCCI Constitution). Immediate Past President is the ex-official member of this Committee. The Executive Committee elects Vice-Presidents and constitutes the Councils and various Committees and Forums. It also appoints Director General who heads the FNCCI Secretariat.

== Significance ==
FNCCI is the largest private sector organization in Nepal and has more than 10,000 direct and indirect members. Direct members are most big business houses and corporate companies of Nepal as well as few multinational companies that have production facilities in the country. FNCCI members consists Total of 104 District/Municipality Level Chamber of Commerce and Industry, 99 Commodity Associations, 12 Bi-National Chamber of Commerce and Industry and 799 Associate Members.

FNCCI is working to promote Nepalese entrepreneurship and Nepalese products across the world. It maintains relations with the representative business associations of various countries of the world. FNCCI is continuously lobbying to strengthens the political framework conditions for a good business environment in the country.

== Initiatives ==
FNCCI organizes among others Nepal International Trade Fair every year to promote Nepalese products across the globe. This trade fair is the biggest in the country and takes usually place in March or April.

With the support of USAID, FNCCI established the Agro Enterprise Centre in 1991 which is promoting agro-business in the country. Within past fifteen years, FNCCI/AEC made valuable contributions in Agro Business Development and Promotion. Since 1 October 2002, FNCCI/AEC has been re-shaped with more focused Mission and Vision and is taking a renewed role in re-presenting the private sector agribusiness community in the development of agriculture and agribusiness in Nepal.

Due to regular power outage (called load shedding) up to 14 hours a day and fuel shortage, Nepalese Industries are facing serious problems and severe production losses. Therefore, FNCCI established the Energy Efficiency Centre (EEC) in 2010 that is a think tank and service provider in the field of energy efficiency. The EEC is the first institution that is raising awareness for energy efficiency in Nepal's private sector and provides professional energy auditing services to the industries.

Furthermore, FNCCI conducts various social activities like sport events, health camps etc. In 2012, FNCCI supported the CACCI-FNCCI Golf Challenge - an international golf competition in Nepal.

Chiranjivi Adhikari, the General Secretary of the CAN Federation, was appointed as the Cybersecurity advisor for the IT Software and Technology Committee by the Nepal Chamber of Commerce on July 28, 2023.

== See also ==
- Economy of Nepal
