= Aashirman DS Joshi =

Nepali actor

- आशिरमान डी. एस. जोशी
- Born: Aashir Man Joshi; 31 August 1998 (age 27); Kathmandu, Nepal
- Occupations: Actor; Model
- Years active: 2017–present
- Known for: Gangster Blues, The Break Up
- Height: 1.92 m (6 ft 3½ in)
- Parents: Bhavendra Man Joshi (father); Raveena Desraj Shrestha (mother)
- Relatives: Ayushman Joshi (brother)
- Awards: National Film Award – Best Debut Actor; Lux Kamana Film Award – Best Debut Actor

Aashirman DS Joshi (Nepali: आशिरमान डी. एस. जोशी) is a Nepalese film actor. He made his feature film debut with Gangster Blues in 2017, directed by Hem Raj BC. His performance as a debutant was well received by audiences and critics alike. For his role, he won the National Film Award and the Lux Kamana Film Award for Best Debut Actor.

His second feature film, The Break Up, was released in 2019, where he played a romantic lead opposite Shilpa Maskey.

Joshi was on the list of 'Top 10 Men and Women of the Year in Nepal' published by Saptahik in 2019.

== Filmography ==
Filmography of Aashirman DS Joshi
Year	Title	Role	Notes
2017	Gangster Blues	Aakash	Feature‑film debut; romantic thriller directed by Hem Raj BC
2019	The Break Up	Aavishkar	Romantic comedy/drama, co‑starring Shilpa Maskey
