= Passang Lhamo =

Tibetan singer

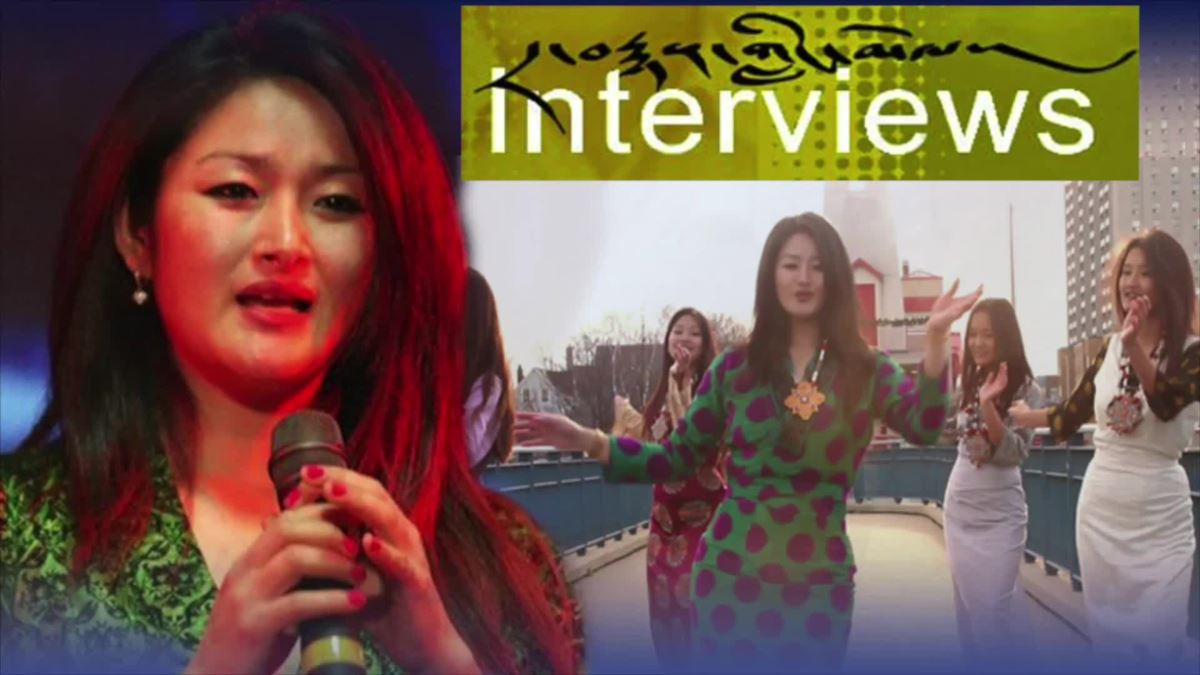
Lhamo in 2017

Passang Lhamo is a Tibetan nun, former political prisoner, activist.

Lhamo, a Tibetan Buddhist, was ordained as a nun at age 14. According to the Tibet government in exile, on 25 May 1994, Lhamo, along with four other nuns, went to Lhasa to shout slogans and to protest over the PRC rule. They were imprisoned by the police and placed in the notorious Drapchi Prison in November 1994 to serve a five-year sentence, charged with endangering state security. The CTA claims in April 1996 all the inmates of Unit 3 of Drapchi prison, consisting of nearly 100 female political prisoners, went on a hunger strike in protest of the harsh treatment they believed they were receiving in Drapchi. The week long strike caused the prison officers some concern that it might damage the reputation of the prison further if the inmates died as a result. They promised an end to the brutality.

Lhamo was eventually set free on 24 May 1999, after five full years in Drapchi. She briefly returned to Penpo, but fled in exile to Dharamsala in India where she now serves as a nun at the Ganden Choeling Nunnery, near the monastery and residence of the Dalai Lama.

There is also a Tibetan singer named Passang Lhamo, who has done much towards the cause of Tibetan independence, including numerous performances singing at various traditional festivals in the United States and Canada. However, contrary to some reports, she was not a Buddhist nun and political prisoner.
