= Ayushman Joshi =

Nepali actor

Ayushman DS Joshi
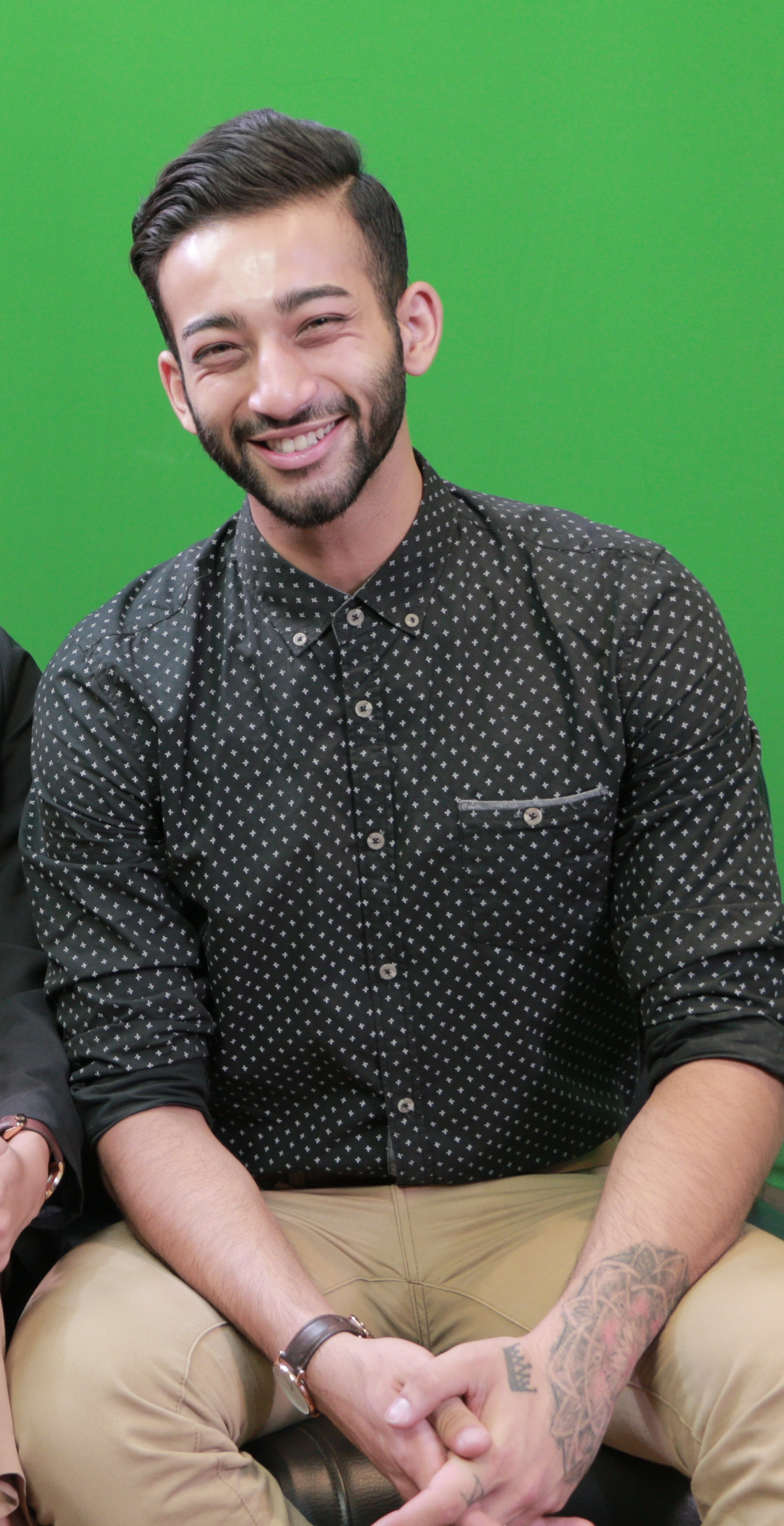
- Born: 17 December 1992 (age 33); Kathmandu, Nepal
- Occupations: Actor, Model
- Years active: 2015–present
- Spouse: Priyanka Karki (m. 2020)
- Children: 1
- Mother: Raveena Desraj Shrestha
- Relatives: Aashirman DS Joshi (brother)

Ayushman Desraj Shrestha Joshi is a Nepalese Model/TV host turned Actor.

He is married to Nepalese film actress Priyanka Karki DS Joshi.

== Early life ==
He was born to a Newari family on 17 December 1993 to Bhavendra Man Joshi and financial CEO Raveena Desraj Shrestha.

== Career ==
He started his career as a VJ from programs "Hollybollywood” and “Global Beats" on Kantipur Television, and debuted as an actor from film Chapali height 2 which was average success.

Beside this, he has appeared in cameo role in Chakka Panja 2, in Katha Kathmandu (2018) and in Changa Chett (2018).

Joshi is the winner of Face of House of Fashion En Vogue 2015, which was held at Hotel Radisson, Kathmandu.

== Filmography ==
- Chapali Height 2 (2016)
- Changa Chet (2018)
- Katha Kathmandu (2018)
- Sano Mann (2019)
- The Blue Light(2026)
- Masterni(2026)

== Personal life ==
Joshi married his long-time girlfriend, fellow Nepalese film actress Priyanka Karki DS Joshi in February 2020. The couple welcomed their first child, a girl, in September 2021.
