= Surakshya Panta =

Nepalese actress

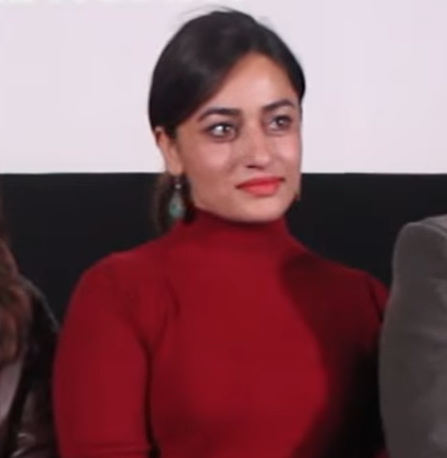
- Surakshya Panta in 2019
- Born: February 20, 1992 (age 34); Butwal, Nepal
- Education: Kathmandu Engineering College (2010–2014)
- Occupations: Actor, engineer
- Years active: 2015–present
- Notable work: Aama, Dhanapati, Ajhai Pani, Pir
- Spouse: Manav Subedi

Surakshya Panta (Nepali: सुरक्षा पन्त) is a Nepalese actress, creative director, and producer. She made her acting debut in Alok Nembang's 2015 film Ajhai Pani in a supporting role. Panta gained fame for her performance in Dhanapati and has also appeared in Nepali films such as Gopi and Aama. She made her international debut in the Italian movie The Eight Mountains, directed by Felix van Groeningen and Charlotte Vandermeersch.

== Personal life ==
Surakshya Panta was born in Butwal, Nepal.She is granddaughter of MP.

Panta married Nepalese film director and music producer Manav Subedi, in March 2023.

== Biography ==
Before entering the film industry, Surakshya Panta worked as a civil engineer. She holds a BE degree in civil engineering and an MSc degree in Integrated Water Resources Management. She started her career in the entertainment industry as a media personality and video jockey (VJ) for national television networks such as Kantipur, Sagarmatha, and News 24. She made her film debut in 2015 withAjhai Pani.

Panta is the first Nepali film actor to walk the red carpet at the Cannes Film Festival (2022). She made her international debut in the Italian film The Eight Mountains, directed by Felix van Groeningen and Charlotte Vandermeersch. The movie won the Jury Prize at the Cannes Film Festival 2022.

Panta made her theater debut in Klesha in Nepal, which was selected for the 2022 National School of Drama International Theater Festival in India. She won a national award for her Nepali feature film Aama, and received the 'Actor of the Year' award at the 2020 Block Buster Nepali Film Awards and the 'Best Supporting Actor' award at the 2019 NEFTA Film Awards.

== Career ==
=== Film debut and commercial success (2015–Present) ===
Panta made her acting debut in Alok Nembang's final film, Ajhai Pani (2015), portraying the role of Shaili in a supporting capacity alongside Sudarshan Thapa and Pooja Sharma.

She later starred in Dipendra K Khanal's Dhanapati (2017), playing the lead role of Dhanapati's wife alongside lead actor Khagendra Lamichhane. On release, the film became a blockbuster in Nepal earning 10 million Nepalese rupees (1 crore) within just two days. Her performance in Dhanapati garnered highly positive feedback from both Nepalese audiences and critics.

In 2018, she appeared in Bhaire (2018), which marked the first collaboration between Dayahang Rai, Barsha Siwakoti, and Sunil Thapa. In the film, she played the role of Dayahang Rai's love interest.

After Bhaire, she collaborated with Naresh Kumar Kc in Romeo & Muna (2018), where she portrayed the role of a nurse named Priya. In the film, she appeared in a supporting role alongside Shristi Shrestha and Vinay Shrestha. Later in 2018, she played the lead role of Manisha in Changa Chet. Her performance in the film received mostly positive feedback. Writing for The Kathmandu Post, Abhimanyu Dixit stated, "... Surakshya Panta's character, Manisha, has a more prominent role..."

In 2019, Panta appeared with Bipin Karki in Gopi (2019), where she played the role of Gopi's romantic interest. The film received the National Film Award for "Best Film" in 2019.

In 2022, she appeared in the film Ke Ghar Ke Dera. In 2023, she portrayed the role of Sandhya Regmi in Bahaab. Later in 2023, she acted in Bulaki.

== Filmography ==
=== Films ===
Year	Name	Role	Notes	Ref(s)
2015	Ajhai Pani	Shaili	Debut film	
2017	Dhanapati	Dhanapati's wife		
2018	Bhaire			
2018	Romeo Muna	Pirya		
2018	Changa Chet	Manisha		
2019	Gopi	Sujata		
2019	Poi Paryo kale			
2019	Ghar	Saru		
2019	Aama	Aarti		
2022	The Eight Mountains	Asmi	Italian film	
2022	Ke Ghar Ke Dera			
2023	Bahaab	Sandhya Regmi		
2023	Bulaki			

=== Music videos ===
2018
Namari Bachey
Timro Rupale

2021
Ye Ni Barai
Mutu Michi

2022
Pir
Badalharu
Paisa Falne Bot

2023
Bhanera ta hera
Mahakali
Saiyya

== Awards ==
Year	Award	Category	Work	Result	Ref(s)
2019	NEFTA Film Award	Best Actor in a Supporting Role (Female)	Gopi	Won	
2020	National Film Award	Best Actor in a Leading Role (Female)	Aama	Won	
2026	Nepal International Film Festival	Best Actor (Female)	Kosedhunga	Won	
