= List of Nepal Bhasa films =

Newari films, also known as Nepal Bhasa films, are a significant part of the cultural and cinematic landscape of Nepal, specifically representing the Newar community. The Newars, the indigenous people of the Kathmandu Valley, have a rich cultural heritage that is reflected in their films, which often portray the customs, language, traditions, and social issues of the Newar community.

This is a list of films produced by the Nepal Bhasa language film industry based in Nepal.

== List of Nepal Bhasa films ==
Key

Key
†	Denotes films that have not yet been released
*	Denotes films still running in theatres

Year	Film	Artist	Director	Producer	Music composer	Editor	Box office
	Bala: Mayaju						
1987	Silu	Nabina Shrestha, Jay Shrestha, Madan Krishna Shrestha, Hari Bansha Acharya	Pradeep Rimal	Prem Baniya and Dan B. Maharjan	Ganesh Prasad Shrestha		
1995	Rajamati	Hisila Maharjan Shree Krishna Shrestha Maniraj Lawat Madan Krishna Shrestha Hari Bansha Acharya Ganesh Ram Lachhi	Neer Shah	Prabhakar Bikram Rana and Laxmi Narayan Newa			
2014	Hisimadu						
2021	Hisimati						
	Hasana						
	Sere Banja						
	Haku Supayen						
	Maya Re Ratna						
2019	Matina ya kali						
2015	Timila	Kusum Gurung, James Shrestha	Damien Kage				
2016	Tuyumati	Manish Shrestha, Arneshwori Shilpakar, Marta, Rajaram Poudel, Hridaya Prasad Mishra, Ganesh Ram Lachhi	Aaryem Nakami	Anu Shrestha Co-producer Diben Shrestha Dipak Shrestha		Mandil Shrestha	
2009	Patachara		Ram Krishna Khadgi				
	Swonegu						
	Jamana: Gubhaju						
	Nhuma Bhamcha						
	Gwanga Kosha						
2015	Reviving Nepal Bhasa		Sam Shakya				
2016	The Legend of Shankhadhar	Rajaram Poudel Madan Krishna Shrestha Kiran K.C Madan Das Shrestha	Sanyukta Shrestha	Sanyukta Shrestha Co. Producer Shashidhar Manandhar Lochan Manandhar Mahanta Shrestha	Bishwo Shahi	Sanyukta Shrestha	
2016	Bakanfusulu						
2016	Krisha Gautami	Shiv Shrestha, Karma Shakya, Melina Manandhar, Nagina Joshi, Ruman Joshi, Loonibha Tuladhar	Ram Krishna Khadgi	Dijendra Shakya, Diprash Shakya		Bal Krishna Banshi	
TBA	Maha Narka						
2017	Thao Jigu Nugha						
2022	Karma		Ram Krishna Khadgi				
TBA	Untitled Project						

== Upcoming Movies ==
Year	Film	Artist	Director	Producer	Music composer	Editor	Box office

== See also ==
- List of foreign films shot in Nepal
- List of Nepal Bhasa films of 2016
- Tharu cinema
- Maithili cinema
- Nepali cinema
