= Vidhan Karki =

Nepali film director

- बिधान कार्की
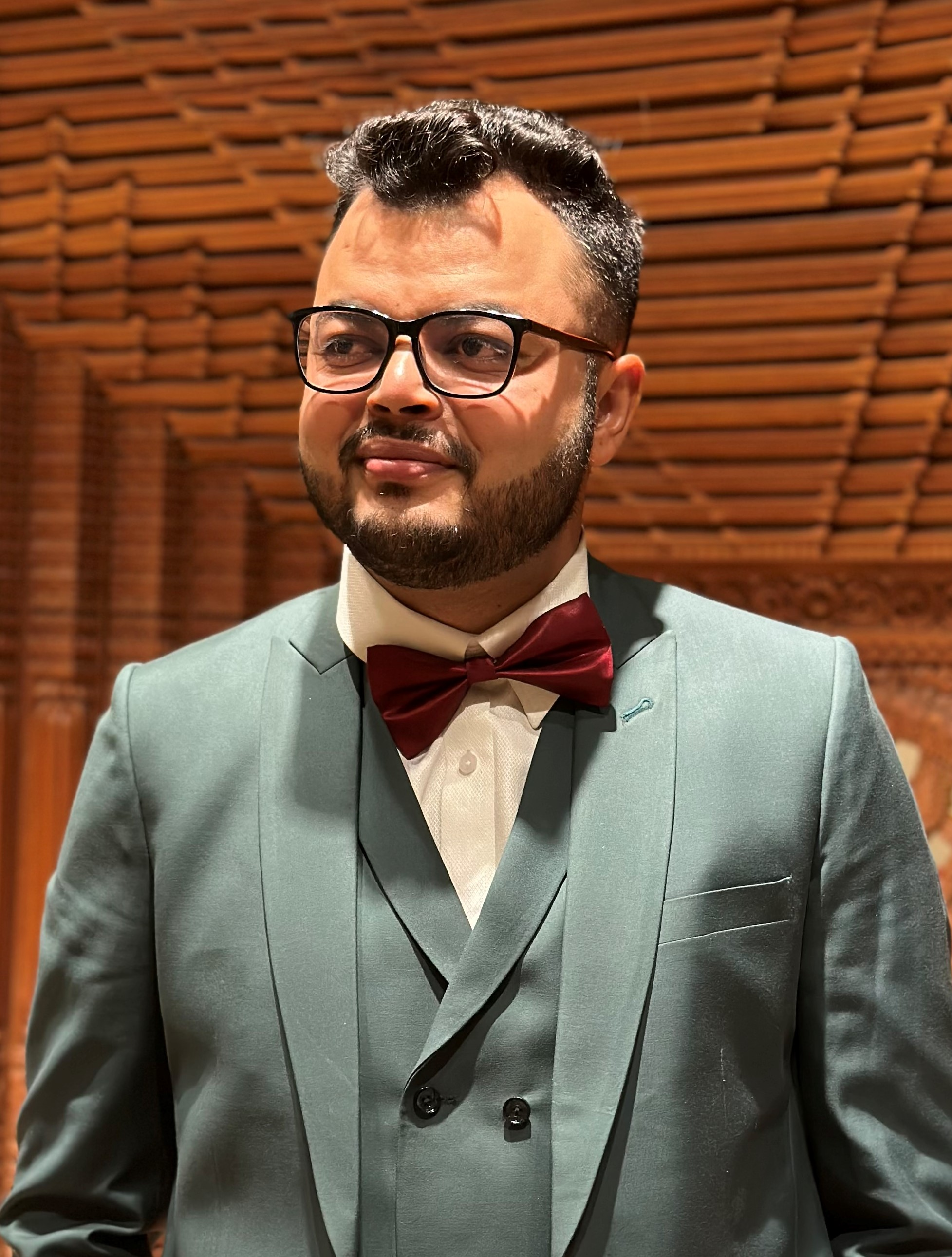
- Born: November, 8 Nepal
- Occupation: Director
- Years active: 2007 to present

Vidhan Karki (Nepali: बिधान कार्की) director of Nepali films and music videos. He has been directing Nepali videos for over a decade and has studied a two-year course in film-making from the United States of America. Also, he has directed more than 100 music videos along with short films, documentaries, and some television commercials.

== About & Biography ==
Vidhan Karki is the director of Nepali Short Films and music videos. Naboli Naboli, Kale Keta 2, Keto Ali Kamaune Hos, Yesto Maya, Mayale Mayale and Mero Desh Nepal are some popular music video on his directing carrier. Samjhanalai Jaali Rumal was the first video he directed. He has also worked on short films and music videos, produced and directed TV commercials and national television shows. Director Karki has directed critically acclaimed short films such as Jeevan Joban Sagun, Garibi, Job Application, Radhika, Chaupadi, Sapana, Daijo, and Prem Katha. He is the President of Music Video Directors Guild of Nepal and also an advisor of Film Development Board, Nepal. He has been awarded on Second Roshni Reels International Short Film Festival 2021 Maharashtra, India and Third Global Nepali Film awards Denver, Colorado, USA

== Songs ==
SN	Song name	Credit	Cast	reference
1	Naboli Naboli	Director	Garima Sharma / Sudhir Shrestha	
2	Dharti Aakash	Director	Pooja Sharma / Aakash Shrestha	
3	Keto Ali Kamaune Hos	Director	Sudhir Shrestha / Shreya Sitaula / Ajay Shrees / Asmita Adhikari	
4	Mayale Mayale	Director	Pooja Sharma / Jitu Nepal / Paul Shah	
5	Chhal Chhal	Director	Prisma Khatiwada / Princy Khatiwada / Amar Dahal / Amrit Dahal	
6	Mero Desh Nepal	Director	Rajesh Payal Rai / Promod Kharel / Arjun Pokharel / Melina Rai	
7	Kale Keta -2	Director	Paul Shah / Pooja Sharma / Aakash Shrestha	
8	Aama Ko Mamata	Director	Sunil Thapa / Gaurav Pahari / Hiunwala Gautam	
9	Yesto Maya	Director	Paul Shah / Usha Upreti	
10	Timro Sansar	Director	Saman Kathayat / Barsha Raut	
11	Aavash	Director	Barsha Siwakaoti / Aakash Shrestha	
12	Telephone Ko tower	Director	Alisha Rai / Aakash Shrestha	
13	Bhidma Pani	Director	Paul Shah / Smriti Shrestha	
14	Maile Boleko Chhaina	Director	Krishna Kafle / Asmita Adhikari / Buddha Lama / Samikshya Adhikari / Kiran Bhujel	
15	Chhudina Ma Jaale Rumal	Director	Shreya Sitaula / Inzamam Ali Khan	
16	Makuri	Director	Harish Niraula / Jibesh Gurung / Alish Rai / Usha Upreti / Smarika Dhalak / Samarika Dhakal	
17	Mayalu Aavash	Director	Aaryan Sigdel / Pooja Sharma	

== Awards ==
SN	Awards Title	Awards Category	Video Name	Result
1	2nd Roshni Reels International Short Film Festival 2021 Maharashtra, India	Best Music Video Concept Award	Keto Ali Kamaune Hos	Won
2	National Entertainment Awards 2021	Best Music Video Director - Juiy	Naboli Naboli	Won
3	3rd Global Nepali Film Award 2018, USA	Best Director of the year - Music Video	-	
4	Nepal Music and Fashion Awards 2021	Best Director Music Video - Modern Song	Naboli Naboli	Won
5	3rd Young Minds Entertainment Award 2021	Best Music Video Director - Modern Song	Naboli Naboli	Won
6	Nepal Best Music Award 2021	Best Video Director	Naboli Naboli	Won
7	4th Roshani International Film Festival 2023	Best Male Director Awards	Aama Ko Mamata	Won
8	Los Angeles Movie and Music Video Award - 2024	Best Asian Music Video 2024	‘Aamako Mamata’ (Mother’s Love)	Won
