= Malvika Subba =

Miss Nepal 2002, actress and Television personality

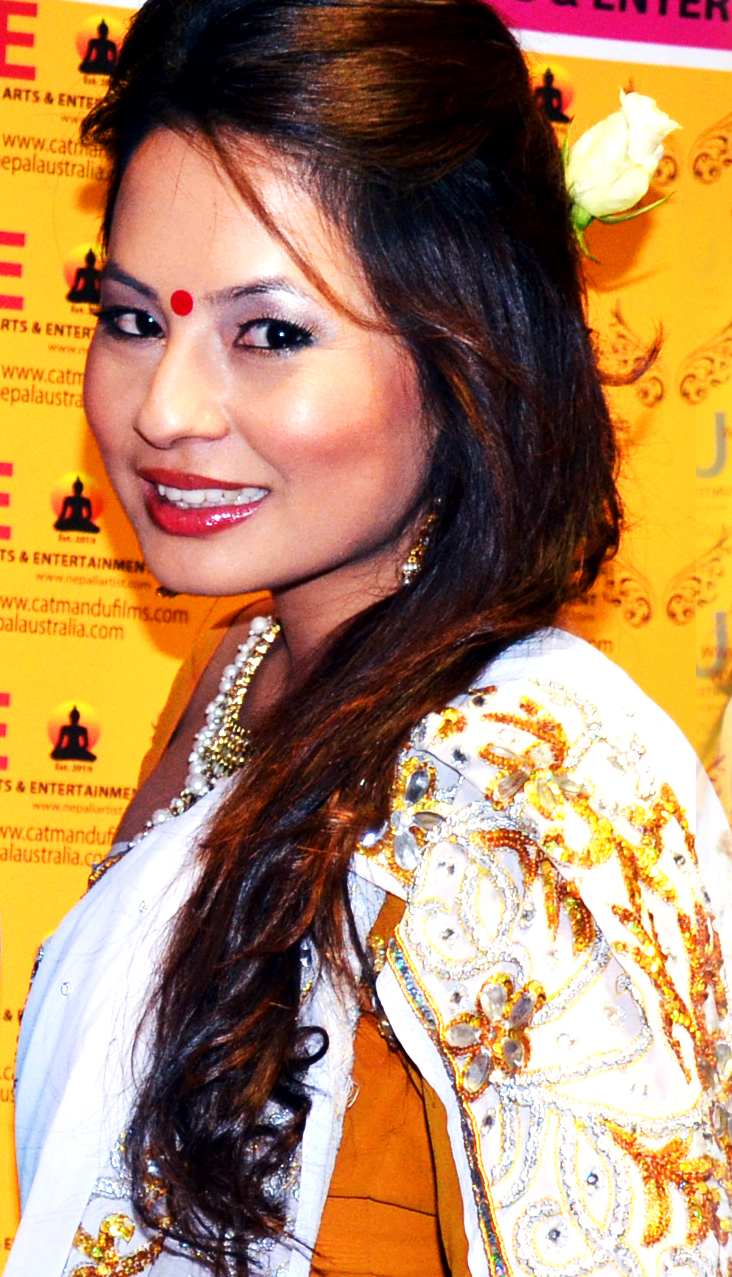
- Malvika Subba, Kathmandu
- Born: Malvika Subba (Limbu); 19 July 1981 (age 45); Dharan, Nepal
- Occupations: Television personality; Social activist; Entrepreneur
- Years active: 2002– present
- Children: 1
- Modeling information
- Height: 5’ 5’ in
- Hair color: Black
- Eye color: Brown
- Website: Malvikasubba.com

Malvika Wanem Subba (Limbu) (Nepali: माल्बिका वनेम सुब्बा (लिम्बु)) is a Nepalese television personality, entrepreneur, model, social activist and beauty pageant title holder who was crowned Miss Nepal 2002 . She has a Masters in Mass Communication and Journalism from Pokhara University.

== Career ==
At the age of 21, Malvika was crowned Miss Nepal 2002. Since then she has worked for Call Kantipur as a TV host at Kantipur Television. In 2008, she worked for Voice of India, MTV EXIT as the Ambassador for Human Trafficking. Subba has also been associated with Youth Spokesperson for Action Aid's Hunger-Free Campaign, HIV/AIDS Youth Leader by UNICEF and worked with Shangrila Housing as Sales and Marketing Manager in 2009–2011.

In 2008, she acted in movies and dramas like God Lives in The Himalayas, Good Bye Kathmandu and Hamri Shiwani.

From April to October 2011, she worked as the chief editor for one of Nepal's leading fashion and lifestyle magazine, Navyaata. In 2011, Subba established her own retail clothing store with in-house designers. She is the Co-Founder and Creative Director of House of Alternative Apparel also known as HAA and Himalayan Climate Initiative(HCI).

From 2015, she is the host and head judge of Mega Model which is now at its third season.

== Controversy ==
In May 2022, a freelance makeup artist alleged that she had been repeatedly raped by a pageant organizer when she was 16 in 2014. She also alleged that she had told Subba about the ordeal at the time but Subba had refused to hear her out and dismissed her claims. Subba was criticized for publicly hosting events around feminism and women's rights while ignoring the plight of a victim. She later issued an apology and pledged to step away from such public platforms for the near future.

== Filmography ==
SN	Year	Film	Role	Director	Reference
1	2009	God Lives in the Himalayas	Mother of Siddharth	Nabin Subba	
2	2011	Goodbye Kathmandu	Cast	Nabin Subba	
3	2016	How Funny	Executive Producer	Nilu Doma Sherpa	

== Awards ==
SN	Award Title	Film Name / Project	Year
1	Best Actor Award	Bhanubhakta	2000
2	Miss Nepal (Winner)	Main Beauty Pageant	2002
3	Best Television Journalist Award	Housewives Association of Nepal	2012
4	Journalism Award	Commission for the Investigation of Abuse of Authority (CIAA)	2015
5	She Knows Where She's Going Award	Girls Incorporated of Lakeland, USA	2019
6	Best Television Anchor	Global Nepali Film, Music, Media and Social Award, USA	—

Awards and achievements
Preceded by Usha Khadgi (Nepal)	Miss Nepal World; 2002	Succeeded by Priti Sitoula (Nepal)
