= Just Another Love Story (web series) =

Romance-drama web series directed by Priyanka Karki

- Genre: romance
- Written by: Shan Basnyat; Priyanka Karki
- Starring: Priyanka Karki; Shristi Shrestha; Samyek Man Singh
- Narrated by: Ayushman Joshi
- Country of origin: Nepal
- Original language: Nepal

Production
- Editor: Priyanaka Karki
- Production company: Prinklebell Pictures

Just Another Love Story is a romance-drama web series, directed and edited by Priyanka Karki in her directorial debut. The series stars Priyanka Karki, Shristi Shrestha, and Samyek Man Singh in the lead roles.

== Plot ==
The plot features friendship and bond between two bestfriends, Maya & Amara portrayed by Shristi Shrestha and Priyanka Karki respectively. However, Amara is in on-again, off-again relationship with her 2 year boyfriend, Aashu (Samyek Man Singh) but she starts to develop strong romantic feelings with her best friend but is not really sure of it as it was a new feeling for both of them. The series involves ups and downs in a newly formed relationship between Maya and Amara.

== Episodes ==
| No. overall | No. in season | Title | Directed by | Written by | Original release date |
|---|---|---|---|---|---|
| 1 | 1 | "Just Friends?" | Priyanka Karki | Priyanka Karki, and Shan Basnet | 15 September 2019 |
| 2 | 2 | "Nothing Happened" | Priyanka Karki | Priyanka Karki, and Shan Basnet | 22 September 2019 |
| 3 | 3 | "Aniket" | Priyanka Karki | Priyanka Karki, and Shan Basnet | 29 September 2019 |
| 4 | 4 | "Let’s experiment" | Priyanka Karki | Priyanka Karki, and Shan Basnet | 6 October 2019 |
| 5 | 5 | "Compromise" | Priyanka Karki | Priyanka Karki, and Shan Basnet | 20 October 2019 |
| 6 | 6 | "It’s Official?" | Priyanka Karki | Priyanka Karki, and Shan Basnet | 27 October 2019 |
| 7 | 7 | "Rainbows and Butterflies" | Priyanka Karki | Priyanka Karki, and Shan Basnet | 10 November 2019 |
| 8 | 8 | "Do I?" | Priyanka Karki | Priyanka Karki, and Shan Basnet | 17 November 2019 |
| 9 | 9 | "Just Friends" | Priyanka Karki | Priyanka Karki, and Shan Basnet | 24 November 2019 |

== Cast ==
- Priyanka Karki as Amara
- Shristi Shrestha as Maya
- Samyek Man Singh as Aashu

== Production ==
On 1 July 2019 Priyanka Karki unveiled three first-look posters of the series via online photo-sharing platform Instagram. Karki chose Ayushman Joshi as a cinematographer, where Joshi said, "Thank you so much Priyanka [Karki] for trusting me on the cinematography front of your project. It has been quite a learning experience for me". Later on 21 July 2019 Karki released series soundtrack titled "Pahaar", the song is performed by New York-based Nepali musician Sajjan Raj Vaidya. Vaidya later stated that he was "Incredibly glad to work together with the wonderful team of Priyanka Karki, Shristi Shrestha, Ayushman DS Joshi and others involved".

Series trailer was released on 1 September 2019, via Karki's official YouTube channel. Upon releasing the trailer Karki made a statement saying, "The series will raise the issue of LGBTQI and their human values", and she further added "The main idea behind developing this series is to address this issue but not as an issue. There are two girls who are possibly in love but it is something new for them". The series contains 9 episodes and was released in September 15 on a weekly basis. It was also announced, the second season will release in 2020, however there has not been any news on the subject since.
