= Krisha Gautami (film) =

Nepali film

Krisha Gautami कृशा गौतमी
- Nepal Bhasa: कृशा गौतमी
- Directed by: Ramkrishna Khadgi
- Written by: unknown
- Dialogues by: unknown
- Screenplay by: unknown
- Story by: Krisha Gautami
- Based on: Kṛśā Gautamī, who was a disciple of Buddha
- Produced by: Dijendra Shakya; Diprash Shakya
- Starring: Shiv Shrestha, Karma Shakya, Melina Manandhar, Nagina Joshi, Ruman Joshi, Loonibha Tuladhar
- Narrated by: unknown
- Cinematography: Ravi Sayami
- Edited by: Bal Krishna Banshi
- Music by: unknown
- Production company: unknown
- Distributed by: unknown
- Release date: 15 January 2016 (Nepal)
- Running time: 135 minutes
- Country: Nepal
- Language: Nepal Bhasa
- Budget: unknown
- Box office: unknown

Krisha Gautami (Newar: कृशा गौतमी) is a 2016 Nepali film made in Nepal Bhasa. The film follows the story of Kṛśā Gautamī, who was a disciple of the Buddha.

The film is directed by Ramkrishna Khadgi, and features Melina Manandhar and Shiva Shrestha in crucial roles.

Krisha Gautami was the second Newari film; the first was Patachara directed by Ramkrishna Khadgi.

Krisha (Kisā) Gautami was a poor young woman who was often mocked because she was very thin (“Kisā” means “slender” or “thin”). She eventually married into a wealthy family and gave birth to a son. Her son’s birth brought her happiness and respect.

However, tragedy struck when her only child died from illness.

Unable to accept his death, Krisha carried her son’s body from house to house, begging people for medicine to bring him back to life. Many thought she had gone mad because she refused to believe he was dead.

Eventually, someone advised her to seek help from the Buddha.

The Buddha told her:

“Bring me a handful of mustard seeds from a house where no one has ever died.”

Krisha went from house to house asking for mustard seeds. Every family was willing to give her the seeds, but each household had experienced the death of a parent, child, spouse, or other relative.

Through this journey, she realized that death is a universal part of life and that no family is free from loss.

She returned to the Buddha, having understood the truth. She accepted her son’s death, performed his funeral rites, and became a disciple of the Buddha. Through meditation and practice, she eventually attained enlightenment (arahantship) according to the Buddhist tradition.

== Cast ==
- Shiv Shrestha,
- Karma Shakya as Dandas
- Melina Manandhar,
- Nagina Joshi,
- Ruman Joshi,
- Loonibha Tuladhar.

== Summaries ==
Special national award from Nepal film Development Board. NEFTA FILM FESTIVAL - Dubai-Best film nominated, NEPAL INDIGINIUS FILM FESTIVAL (NIFF) NEWYORK-10 categories nominated and won best editor prize.
