= Chiso Ashtray =

- Directed by: Dinesh Palpali
- Produced by: Maheshbabu Timalsina
- Starring: Shristi Shrestha, Robin Tamang, Divya Dev, Nikun Shrestha, Nabin Lamsal, and Sushil Raj Pandey
- Cinematography: Ujjal Bastakoti
- Edited by: Ujjwal Dhakal
- Production companies: Kangaroo Creations and Local Cinema Production
- Release date: 18 March 2022
- Running time: 130 minutes
- Country: Nepal
- Language: Nepali

Chiso Ashtray (Nepali: चिसो एस्ट्रे, lit. 'Cold ashtray') is a 2022 Nepalese drama film directed by Dinesh Palpali. Starring Shristi Shrestha, Robin Tamang, Divya Dev, Nikun Shrestha, Nabin Lamsal, and Sushil Raj Pandey, the film is based on Bhupi Sherchan's poem "Chiso Ashtray". The film was released on 18 March 2022.

== Cast ==
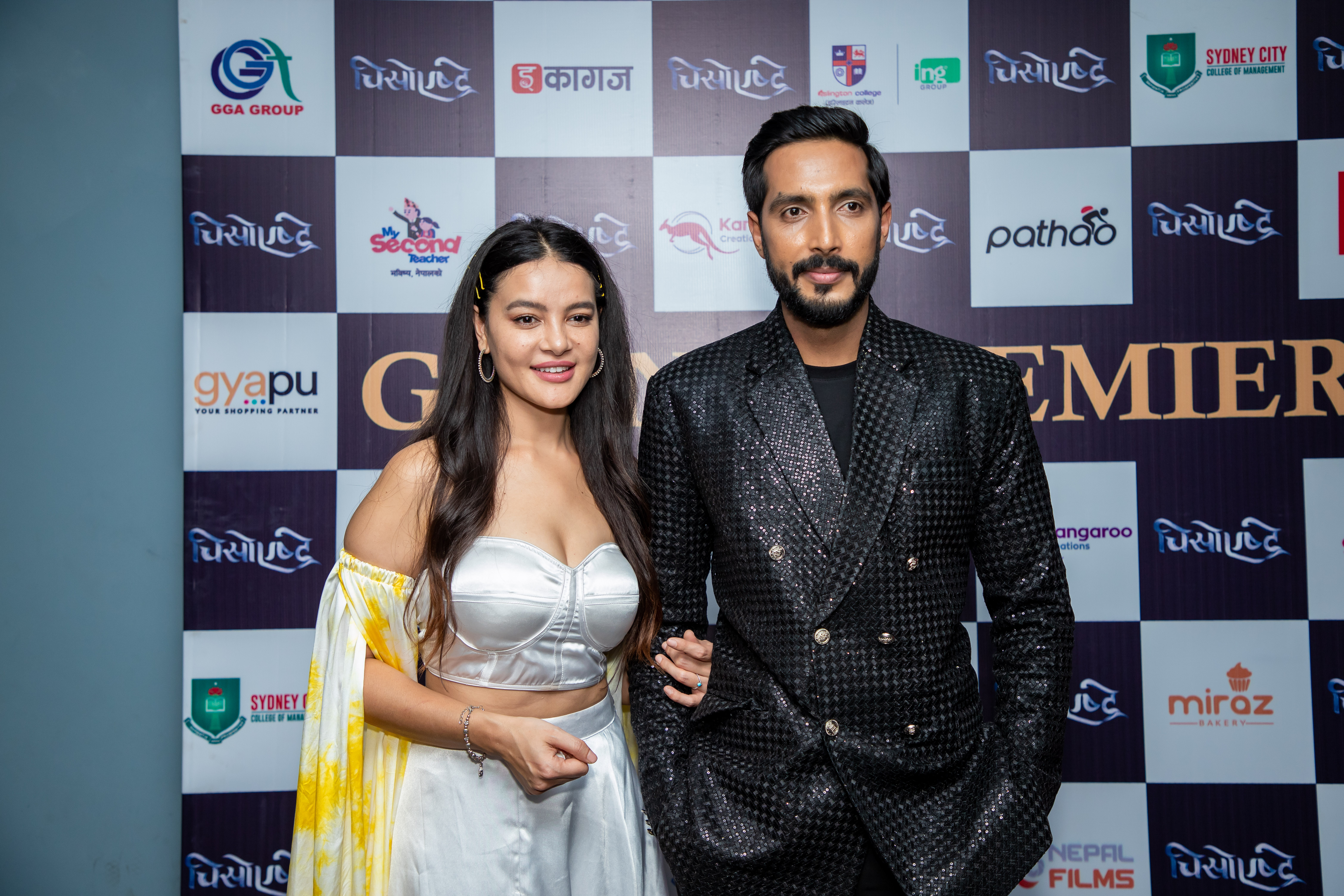
Actors Shristi Shrestha and Divya Dev at film premiere.

- Divya Dev as Madan
- Nikun Shrestha as Rony
- Nabin Lamsal as Jacky
- Shristi Shrestha as Salinta
- Sushil Raj Pandey as Bikki Bheja
- Robin Tamang as Boby dai
- Evon Joshi as Albin aaty
- Rinex Basnet as Bhuwan Bhukka

== Synopsis ==
Madan, an innocent villager, arrives in Kathmandu, Nepal with dreams in his eyes, and a heart full of fire. As a Taxi Driver, he is feels inferior to the ultra-modern lifestyle of Kathmandu. In his desperation to fit in, he changes his attire, his lifestyle, and even makes new friends. This change however comes with dire consequences. Now, he is at a risk of losing his friends, his mentor, his love, and even his innocence.

== Critical reception ==
Shranup Tandukar from The Kathmandu Post criticized the character development of the film. He has claimed the problem with the film is that "we do not feel for the lead character at any point in the film". He has praised the cinematography, costumes, and the sound, but has criticized the way the story was told and character was developed.

== Music ==
No.	Title	Lyrics	Music	Singer(s)	Length
1.	"Dream Piracy"	Dinesh Palpali	Ajar Jangam	Ajar Jangam	5:03
2.	"Baba Pashupati"	Dinesh Palpali	Ajar Jangam	Sabin Rai	4:12
3.	"Chiso Ashtray"	Robin Tamang	Robin Tamang	Robin Tamang	4:20
4.	"Still Dream"	Garima Gurung	Garima Gurung	Garima Gurung	4:42
