= Numafung =

2001 Nepalese film by Nabin Subba

- Directed by: Nabin Subba
- Screenplay by: Nabin Subba
- Story by: Kaziman Kandangwa
- Based on: Karobar Ki Gharbar
- Produced by: Chhabilal Hangshrong Limbu, Saraswati Hangshrong Limbu
- Cinematography: Raju Thapa
- Edited by: Sameera Jain
- Music by: Nhyoo Bajracharya
- Production companies: INA Cassettes and Video Production Pvt. Ltd.
- Distributed by: INA Cassettes and Video Production Pvt. Ltd.
- Release date: 2001
- Running time: 110 mins
- Country: Nepal
- Languages: Limbu and Nepali

Numafung [nʊmɑːfʊŋ] is a 2001 Nepali-language film that portrays the culture and tradition of the Limbu community. It is directed by Nabin Subba, who also wrote the screenplay. The film was screened at the Thirteenth Finnish Indigenous Film Festival. The lead characters in the movie are Anupama Subba, Niwahangma Limbu, Prem Subba, Alok Nembang and Ramesh Singhak. Numafung means a "beautiful flower" in the Limbu language. The majority of shooting took place at Panchthar, Nepal, and in Sikkim and Assam.

== Plot ==
Numa is a typical village girl who is still unmarried and lives with her parents, grandmother and younger sister.

Ojahang comes to Numa's home with his relatives and friends to ask for Numa's hand in marriage. Numa's father is not satisfied with the amount of money (Sunauli Rupauli, traditionally demanded to assess the groom's financial status) they present and replies that they can take his daughter (he will agree to the marriage) if they can fulfill his demand. Ojahang's uncle agrees to fulfill the demand as said by Numa's father to protect their prestige and sends Ojahang with one guy accompanying him to bring enough money back from home. As they are back with the money, Ojahang's uncle presents the money and hands the sum over to Numa's father and both of them agree to the deal.

Numa and Ojahang are happily married. After a couple of months, Numa falls pregnant and the message is sent to her parents. Numa's parents send her younger sister, Lojina to Ojahang's home along with a potter lady carrying gifts and accompaniments to visit her.

One day, Numa and Lojina go to visit Ojahang who is building a shed some distance away from home. Ojahang hurts himself when a log of wood falls down upon him and hits him while he is working and is carried back home. Later on, Lojina dreams of her brother-in-law, Ojahang slipping and falling from a tree and wakes up in shock. Ojahang is dead by then.

Numa is completely lost and broken after her husband, Ojahang's death as they were married only a couple of months ago but they had started developing feelings for one another and she was still pregnant with his child. After attending the funeral of his son-in-law, Numa's father tries to return home with his daughter Lojina. But seeing the grieving Numa, he makes an effort to leave his younger daughter, Lojina to take care of and accompany her elder sister Numa. While performing some chores, Numa miscarries the child she had with Ojahang causing her to move back in to her parents' house. It takes Numa quite a while but she eventually gets over the death of Ojahang and her miscarriage.

Numa visits a local festival with her friends and Lojina where she encounters one of her long time admirers, Rikute. Rikute tries to win Numa's heart and promises to come back to ask for her hand in marriage to her parents. Numa jokingly challenges Rikute to show his bravery and courage by paying Sunauli Rupauli and taking her.

Meanwhile, Numa's father has already received an offer for Numa's marriage with a rich guy, Girihang from another village. Her father tries to stall and shake off the offer by increasing the amount of Sunauli Rupauli consistently because it hasn't been long since Numa got over her husband's sudden death and the following miscarriage but realises that it is futile to do so; Girihang is able to meet his demands for Sunauli Rupauli very easily. He mumbles that no matter how hard a girl's family tries to keep her, a daughter is fated to leave her parents' house and get married. He reluctantly agrees to the marriage as it would be unreasonable to reject Girihang's offer for no apparent reason since his requirements have already been met.

When Numa is told about her second marriage arrangement, she escapes to Ojahang's house to avoid the marriage. Numa's father goes to get her back but she refuses to see him. Thus, Ojahang's mother tearfully explains to her that as much as she would like to keep Numa in the house, she needs to get remarried to Girihang because there is no child to justify her staying at Ojahang's and that her father has already agreed to the marriage; not fulfilling that agreement would bring shame upon her family. She is unwillingly married to Girihang and she makes no effort to hide her unwillingness by resisting certain rituals of the wedding.

Numa experiences a harsh life after her second marriage. Girihang seems to be an arrogant bully who is also a heavy drinker, likes gambling, is always getting into fights and is used to having his way. She is mistreated and beaten by Girihang after she pushes him away and shows her unwillingness to consummate her marriage with him.

Unable to withstand the behavior and rudeness of her second husband Girihang, Numa secretly flees away with Rikute. The next day, Lojina hears of the news as she is running down to perform some chores and delivers the news to her parents. Girihang then shows up with a bunch of his male relatives, demanding that Numa's father pay him back the sum that was taken during the agreement of the marriage.

Numa's parents are now bound to pay back the large sum of money. As Numa's family members walk along, Numa's father tearfully looks back at their house one last time before leaving the village to settle somewhere else; he has sold his house and all of his land to pay Girihang back.

== Cast ==
- Alok Nembang as Ojahang
- Anupama Subba as Numa
- Niwahangma Limbu as Lojina
- Prem Subba as Girihang
- Rammaya Tumrock as Fungloti
- Ramesh Singhak as Rikute

== Accolades ==
Numafung has won two International award. In 2003, Numafung was awarded as Best Runner-Up Movie Award in International Film Festival held in Dhaka, Bangladesh. The film was selected among 123 entries from 36 countries.

Numafung also bagged Audience Choice Award in Bijul International Film Festival held in France.
