= Ajhai Pani =

- film Poster
- Directed by: Alok Nembang
- Written by: Ramsharan Pathak
- Produced by: Punam Gautam
- Starring: Sudarshan Thapa; Pooja Sharma; Bijay Lama; Mithila Sharma
- Cinematography: Rajesh Shrestha
- Edited by: Pritam pandey
- Release date: 27 February 2015 (Nepal)
- Country: Nepal
- Language: Nepali

Ajhai Pani is a Nepali film released in February 2015. It is the final film of director Alok Nembang. The film features Sudarshan Thapa and Puza Sharma in lead roles.

== Plot ==
The movie portrays a romance between Kushal (Sudarshan Thapa) and Yunisha (Puza Sharma). It also features Surakshya Pant as Shaili, and Bijay Lama as Yunisha's uncle.

== Cast ==
- Sudarshan Thapa as Kushal
- Pooja Sharma as Yunisha
- Surakshya Panta as Shaili
- Mithila Sharma as Kushal's grandmother
- Ramsharan Pathak as of Kushal's grandfather
- Bijay Lama as Yunisha's uncle
- Bishal Dhungana as Bhuwan
- Pushpa Khadka as Biren

== Soundtrack ==
No.	Title	Singer(s)	Length
1.	"Ho Yestai Raicha Maya"	Sahima Shrestha, Dinesh Gautam	4:05
2.	"Jati Herchau Timi Malai"	Deepak Limbu, Sahima Shrestha	4:38
3.	"Prem Diwas"	Hari Lamsal	4:31
4.	"K Kura Kasle"	Raju Tamang	3:30
5.	"Chamak Chamak Ratyauli"	Manisha Pokhrel, Rita Budhathoki	3:29
