= Aama (2020 film) =

2020 Nepali drama film

- Theatrical release poster
- Nepali: आमा
- Directed by: Dipendra K. Khanal
- Written by: Dipendra K. Khanal
- Produced by: Sharmila Pandey
- Starring: Mithila Sharma; Surakshya Panta; Sarita Giri; Deshbhakta Khanal; Manish Niraula
- Production company: DS Digital
- Release date: 21 February 2020
- Country: Nepal
- Language: Nepali

Aama (Nepali: आमा, transl. Mother) is a 2020 Nepali drama film, directed and written by Dipendra K. Khanal. The film is produced by Sharmila Pandey under the banner of DS Digital. The film stars Mithila Sharma, Surakshya Panta in the lead roles and alongside Sarita Giri, Deshbhakta Khanal, Manish Niraula, Laxmi Bhusal, Tika Pahari, Padam Prasad Poudel, Aashant Sharma, Saroj Aryal. The film is about relationship of mother and daughter. The film generally received positive feedback from the critics.

== Plot ==
Yagya Prasad Aryal (Desh Bhakta Khanal) is in an incident which caused a serious head injury. His wife admits him to a hospital in Kathmandu. In Kathmandu, she only has her daughter Arati (Surakshya Panta) and her husband (Manish Niraula). Yagya Prasad goes through an expensive surgery. Arati's brother cannot come to Kathmandu since he is in the United States, now she has to take care of her father and mother.

== Cast ==
- Mithila Sharma as Aama
- Surakshya Panta as Arati
- Sarita Giri as a mother of a newborn baby
- Deshbhakta Khanal as Yagya Prasad Aryal / father
- Manish Niraula as Arati's husband
- Laxmi Bhusal as grandmother
- Tika Pahari
- Arpan Thapa as Arati's elder brother (voice)
- Padam Prasad Poudel
- Aashant Sharma
- Saroj Aryal

== Production ==
Actress Surakshya Panta agreed to shave her head for the role.

== Release and reception ==
Sunny Mahat of The Annapurna Express said that Aama is a must-watch, he elaborated "Aama breaks norms, dismantles stereotypes and proves there are mature filmmakers and artists in the industry. It's a story without theatrical augmentations that we call can relate to". Diwakar Pyakurel of Online Khabar praised Surakshya Panta writing, "Panta has done an excellent job; she looks natural in her emotionally-turbulent role. This project has elevated her one step up in her career". The staff of Moviemanu wrote, "The movie is not for someone who seeks a lighthearted entertainment in the theater. The movie doesn't break any ground or directs towards any resolution to the alarming situation of our health sector. However, if you are in a different emotional mood, you won't be disappointed. However, don't jump in by looking merely at the title". Gokarna Gautam of Kantipur praised the actress Panta for her acting.
