= Karma Shakya =

Nepalese film and theatre actor

- कर्म
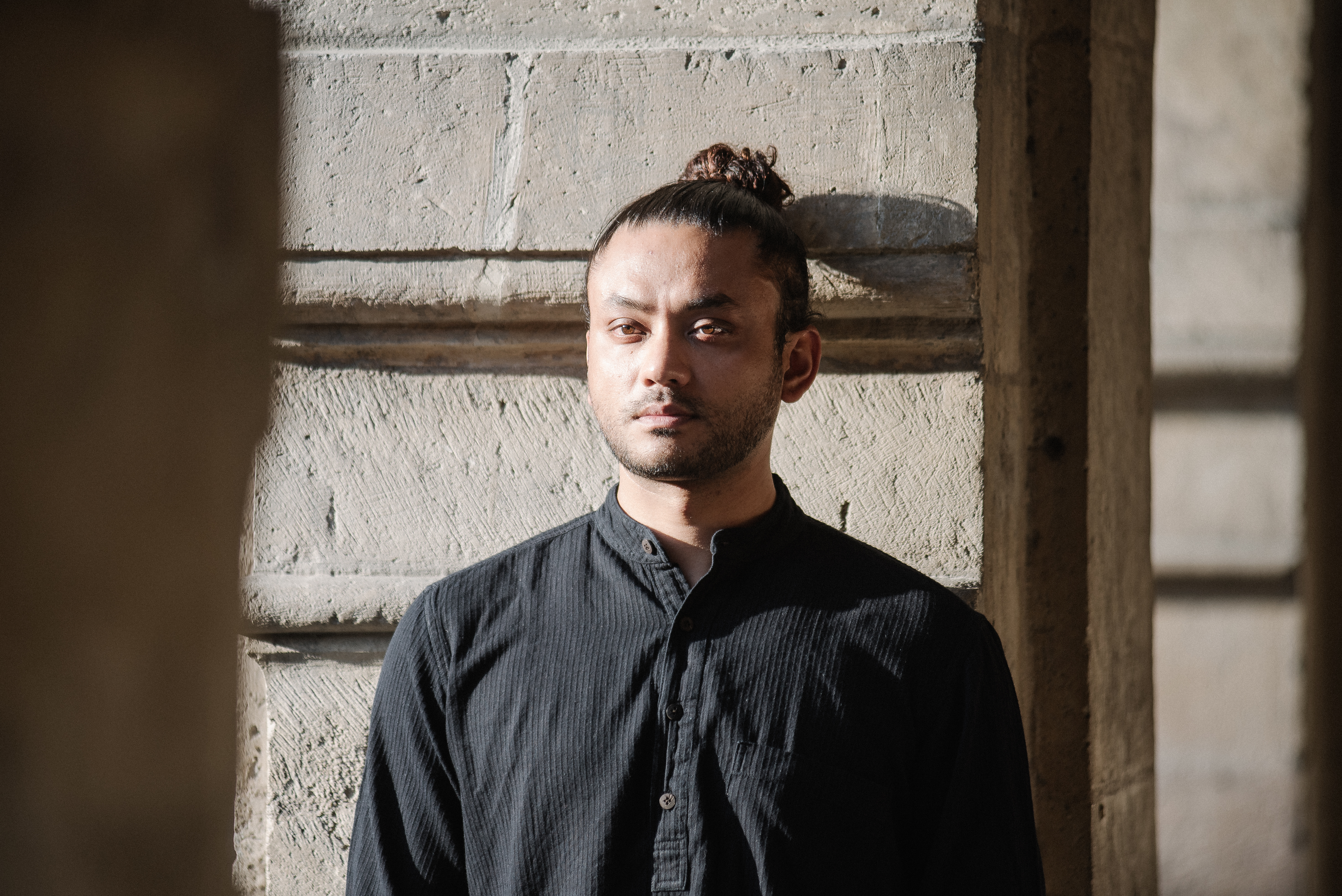
- Karma in Paris, 2018
- Born: Mahesh Man Shakya; January 5, 1986 (age 40); Kathmandu, Nepal
- Citizenship: Nepali
- Education: St. Xavier's School, Gurukul School of Theatre, Kathmandu, Nepal
- Occupation: Actor
- Notable work: Loot, Shambhala
- Title: Karma
- Website: Karma Shakya at IMDb

Karma (born Mahesh Man Shakya) is a Nepali film and theatre actor. He made his feature film debut in Sano Sansar (2008) and has since appeared in films including Loot (2012), Kathaputali - The Puppet (2021), Lukamari (2016), Love Sasha (2017), Suntali (2014) and First Love (2010). In 2024, he appeared in Shambhala, directed by Min Bahadur Bham, which premiered in the Official Competition at the 74th Berlin International Film Festival. Shambhala became the first Nepali film selected for the Berlinale festival's main competition.

== Early life and education ==
Karma was born Mahesh Man Shakya in Kathmandu, Nepal. He studied at St. Xavier's School in Kathmandu before continuing his education in Pune, India. Drawn to acting from an early age, he trained in performing arts at the Gurukul School of Theatre in Kathmandu, graduating in 2007. He later continued his training at Studio 7–Naga Theatre under the mentorship of theatre director Sabine Lehmann.

== Career ==
Karma began his acting career in theatre before being cast in the lead role of Sano Sansar (2008), marking his feature film debut. He subsequently established himself in the Nepali film industry through performances in films including Loot, Suntali, First Love, Love Sasha, Lukamari and Kathaputali, appearing in both commercial and independent productions.

In addition to his film work, Karma has remained active in theatre and has appeared in numerous music videos and commercial campaigns. He has also showcased his singing and dancing in several productions, including performing the song "Ghintang Ghisi Twak" in Lukamari.

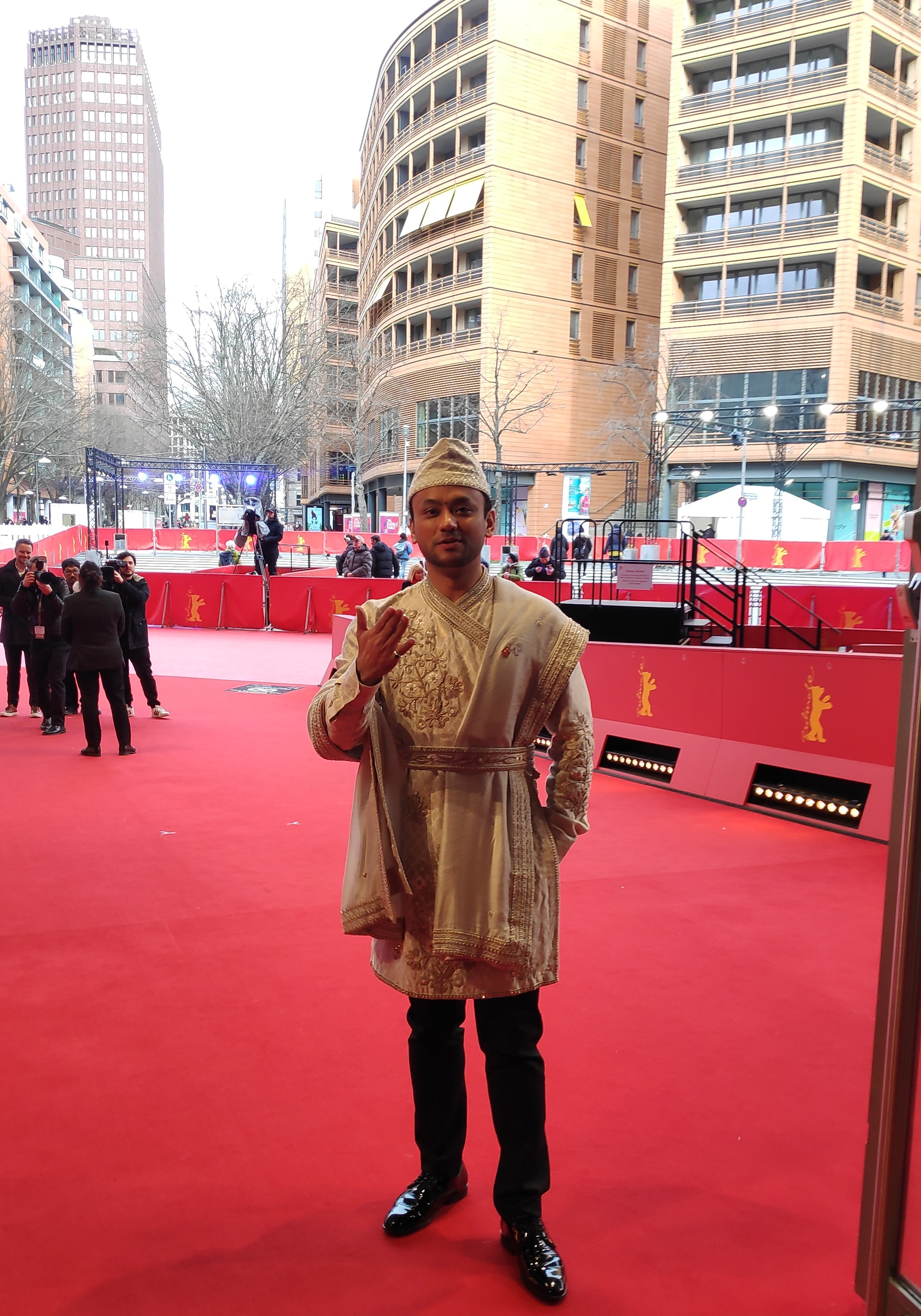
Nepali actor Karma Shakya on the red carpet at the world premiere of Shambhala during the 74th Berlin International Film Festival (Official Competition).

In 2024, Karma portrayed Ram Sir in Shambhala, directed by Min Bahadur Bham. The film premiered in the Official Competition at the 74th Berlin International Film Festival, becoming the first Nepali film selected for the festival's main competition.

Karma continues to work on both national and international productions.

== Filmography ==
=== Feature films ===
Year	Film	Role	Notes
2008	Sano Sansar	Ravi Thapa	Feature film debut
2008	Patachara	Man Raja	Nepal Bhasa film
2009	Ek Din Ek Raat	Gen	
2010	First Love	Gaurav	
2010	Goodbye Kathmandu	Mangal	Unreleased
2010	Mrigatrishna	Keshar	
2012	Highway	Abiral	
2012	Loot	Naresh	
2013	Adhyaya	Ram	
2013	Suntali	Sundar	
2013	Visa Girl	Sandesh	
2014	Bhram	Shyam	
2014	Sapana	Raj	
2015	Resham Filili	Bryan Rai	
2016	Helen	Ved	Unreleased
2016	Krisha Gautami	Dandas	Nepal Bhasa film
2016	Lukamari	Unique Maharjan	
2017	Loot 2	Naresh	
2017	Love Sasha	Prahlad	
2017	Jhyanakuti	Jhakri	Cameo
2017	Sher Bahadur	Kumar	
2018	Panche Baja	Rudra	
2019	The Man from Kathmandu	Sher Thapa	
2019	Garud Puran	Rambo	
2019	Rose	DSP Dangol	
2019	Sarkari Jagir	Ramesh	Unreleased
2019	Kabaddi Kabaddi Kabaddi	Myaki	Third installment in the Kabaddi film series
2021	Kathaputali: The Puppet	Prince Akash	
2021	Mahanagar - One Night in Kathmandu	Dinesh	
2022	Karma	Karma	Nepal Bhasa film
2022	Shatkon	Rupak	
2024	Shambhala	Ram sir	Premiered in Official Competition at the 74th Berlin International Film Festival

=== Short films ===
Year	Film	Role	Notes
2023	La Symphonie des Marteaux		French Short film
2025	Maitighar	Prabal	French Short film

=== Television ===
Year	Film	Role	Episodes	Notes
2022	Crime Patrol Nepal		S1 E01 & E02	Television series
