= Romeo & Muna =

- Film poster
- Directed by: Naresh Kumar Kc
- Starring: Vinay Shrestha; Shristi Shrestha; Prajwal Sujal Giri; Sushma Karki; Surakshya Panta
- Edited by: Lokesh Bajracharya
- Music by: Songs: Kali Prasad Baskota; Gaurav Dagaonkar; Koshish Chettri; Hercules Basnet; Scores: Rohit Shakya; Shailesh Shrestha
- Release date: 27 July 2018
- Country: Nepal
- Language: Nepali

Romeo & Muna (Nepali:रोमियो एण्ड मुना) is a 2018 Nepalese comedy-drama film directed and written by Naresh Kumar Kc. Produced by Prasanna Man Gopali, Rosy Shrestha, Ram Sharma, and Kabin Shakya under the banner of V Motion Pictures, and KS Productions. The film stars Vinay Shrestha and Shristi Shrestha in the lead roles alongside Prajwal Sujal Giri, Sushma Karki, and Surakshya Panta. The characters on the film are inspired by Devkota's Muna and Shakespeare's Romeo. The film is about a rich man named Romeo who meets a poor girl in Dharan named Muna, but will they be together.

== Plot ==
Ved (Vinay Shrestha), and Muna (Shristi Shrestha) are from different parts of the society one from the rich and one from the poor. Both of them meet in Dharan after meeting her both of their lives will change forever.

== Cast ==
- Vinay Shrestha as Ved
- Shristi Shrestha as Muna
- Surakshya Panta as Pirya
- Sushma Karki as Juile
- Menuka Pradhan as Dancer
- Prajwal Sujal Giri as Aaryan
- Kulchandra Neupane as Peon Baa

== Soundtrack ==
No.	Title	Lyrics	Music	Singer(s)	Length
1.	"Dancema Ma Ek Number"	Dinesh Raut, Naresh Kumar KC	Koshish Chhetri	Koshish Chhetri, Deepa Lama, Jhuma Niraula, Meena Pokharel Niraula	5:43
2.	"Pal Pal"	Bishwo Shahi	Bishwo Shahi	Sukmit Gurung	5:27
3.	"Sanjh Paryo"	Ektare, Kali Prasad Baskota	Kali Prasad Baskota	Gaurav Dagaonkar	5:01
4.	"Bhedetar Ghumaula"	Dinesh Raut	Koshish Chhetri	Vinay Shrestha, Mina Niraula	4:47
5.	"Timrai Lagi Ho"	Hercules Basnet, Sabin Ektaare	Hercules Basnet, Gaurav Dagaonkar	Gaurav Dagaonkar, Orunima Bhattacharya	4:49
6.	"Sandwich Me"	Earl URL Edgar	Gaurav Dagaonkar	Earl URL Edgar	3:38
