= Goodbye Kathmandu =

- Film poster
- Directed by: Nabin Subba
- Written by: Rajesh Gongaju
- Starring: Karma Shakya
- Cinematography: Theierry Taieb
- Release date: 2017
- Country: Nepal
- Language: Nepali

Goodbye Kathmandu is a Nepali movie directed by Nabin Subba. The main characters of the film are Anoop Baral, Malvika Subba, Karma and Shahana Shrestha. This movie portrays the story of struggle to migrate to live in the capital city of Nepal i.e. Kathmandu. Rajesh Gongaju is the author of the film. Theierry Taieb is the cinematographer. The film was premiered at Busan International Film Festival in 2024.
