= Melina Manandhar =

Nepali actress and producer

- Born: 16 October 1977 (age 48); Kathmandu, Nepal
- Occupations: Actress, producer
- Years active: 1993–present
- Spouse: Mukesh Dhakal (2008 – present)
- Awards: National Film Awards (2010)

Melina Manandhar (Nepali: मेलिना मानन्धर; born October 16, 1977, as Sunita Manandhar) is a Nepalese actress, model and producer. She has acted in films, telefilms, television serials and music videos in Nepali and Newar languages.

== Career ==
Since making her debut in Priyasi (1993) she has acted in over sixty Nepali and Nepal Bhasa language films and television dramas. She appeared in a supporting role in period drama Prem Pinda (1995) considered a classic in Nepali cinema. She also produced a Nepali film Jwalamukhi and a television show Karuna which aired on Nepal Television.

She won the National Film Award in a special category as Best Actress for Indigenous Movie for her performance in Nepal Bhasa film Balamaiju in 2010.

In 2014 she was appointed as a member of the Censor Board of Nepal by Ministry of Information and Communication.

== Personal life ==
She was born to Maan Krishna Manandhar and Lalita Manandhar and spent most of her childhood in Kathmandu. She married actor Mukesh Dhakal in 2008 and they have a daughter Melishka Dhakal.

== Filmography ==
Year	Title	Note
1993	Priyasi	
1993	Arpan	
1993	Milan	
1994	Sarangi	
1994	Aparadh	
1995	Jaali Rumal	
1995	Prem Pinda	
1995	Simana	
1996	Daijo	
1996	Pratigya	
1996	Sangam	
1996	Chori Buhari	
1997	Bandhan	
1997	Bishalu	
1997	Dautari	
1997	Ke Bho Launa Ni	
1997	Chhoro	
1998	Pirati Afai Hundo Raicha	
1998	Rani Khola	
1998	Bhariya	
1998	Army	
1998	Mero Hajur	
1998	Bhai	
1998	Mato Bolcha	
1998	Chhahaari	
1999	Ghumto	
1999	Bhagwan	
2001	Badal Pari	
2002	Mamaghar	
2005	Parkhirakha Hai	
2006	Feri Arko Saino	
2008	Sano Sansar	
2009	God Lives in the Himalayas	
2009	Jwalamukhi	
2010	Kaslai Diu Yo Jovan	
2010	Balamaiju	
2010	Patachara	
2016	Krisha Gautami	a Newari film
2017	Romeo	
2017	Lalteen	
