= Lukamari =

- Theatrical poster
- Directed by: Shree Ram Dahal
- Screenplay by: Binod Khatiwada
- Produced by: Suraj Man Singh Bhandari, Tej Man Singh Bhandari, Sandeep Acharya, Bikram Bhandari, Krishna Bhandari
- Starring: Saugat Malla; Karma Shakya; Bikram Singh Tharu J.B.D.C.
- Cinematography: Sushan Prajapati
- Edited by: Krishna Bhandari
- Music by: Bikash Silwal
- Production company: Glaze Entertainment Pvt. Ltd.
- Release date: 2016
- Running time: 125 minutes
- Country: Nepal
- Language: Nepali
- Budget: 75lakh
- Box office: 1.65 crore NPR

Lukamari is 2016 crime action film written and directed by Shree Ram Dahal. The film stars Saugat Malla, Karma Shakya, Bikram Singh Tharu, Surabina Karki, and Rista Basnet in lead roles. The film is slightly based on Khyati Shrestha murder case of 2009. The movie is regarded as one of the best movies ever created in Nepalese film industry. It is counted among the revolutionary movies like Loot, Kabaddi, etc. made in mid 2010s in Nepal which are credited for introducing a new way of movie making in Nepal. The movie is made special by very special role of Saugat Malla and the best role played by Karma Shakya in his entire film career till date as claimed by critics and audience. Unfortunately, the movie had to clash with very much anticipated Bollywood movie that year by Salman Khan named 'Sultan' which occupied the major portion of screen and audience attention in Nepal. So it did a lot less income than the movie deserved and than producers expected. But all the movie viewers claim the movie to be a true gem for Nepalese Movie Industry.

== Plot ==
Lukamari means hide and seek. The film story is based on a police investigation of a murder case of a school girl Rupa K.C. As the film unfolds, the case gets connected to the tenants of Musya Sahu and the hide and seek between cops and criminals starts. The movie starts when two undercover veteran crime investigating agents meet coincidentally and start sharing a same room in some place in Kathmandu valley. In the movie they are investigating two seemingly different cases. One cop is seen investigating murder case of a young girl and another cop is seen finding clues about murder of two young boys. The cop in girl's murder case is dragged to Kathmandu due to the relation of the girl with a suspicious sick teacher of her and another cop finds some papers of land in the crime scene that gives hint about the criminal's location. To keep the mission secret both the cops change their names, jobs and motives of living in the valley without any idea about each other's reality. The movie starts with some comedy and proceeds with the suspicious acts of all the actors in the screen. The movie also showcases some side characters like a priest, some drug addict youths and a tea shopkeeper who initially seem to be present for comedy but things change afterwards. As the film reaches to its interval there start a rapid change in all aspects. The two cops spying on a young girl living in the same house as they do and a love affair between a married women and a handsome landlord carries the comedy till the end but every minute brings few more thrill as the suspense starts disclosing. The two cops again meet coincidentally to find out each other's identity. They share their investigations just to know that their cases are somehow interconnected. At the climax, they find out that both their suspect lives next door to them. The suspect happens to be the husband of the women who is in affair with the landlord. So the cops use the landlord to get into the suspect's room and after finding a solid proof of him being the criminal, they raid in his house a thrilling chase begins. The chase discloses the reasons of murder and also the identities of some seemingly less significant characters like the priest. The movie focuses on comedy, thrill, suspense, Nepalese crime fighting methods and also some problems of Kathmandu like unemployment, lack of water and prostitution.

== Cast ==
- Saugat Malla as Budhan Chaudhary
- Karma Shakya as Unique Maharjan
- Bikram Singh Tharu as Kirateshwar Rai
- Surabina Karki as Jaya Giri
- Rista Basnet as Ragini
- Krishna Bhakta Maharjan as Musya Sahu

== Critical reception ==
This film received generally mixed critical review. Many critics who were attracted by new types of story lines being portrayed in movies at those years found the movie to be a revolution in the industry but some people who searched for the classical tone of Nepalese movies in this movie really could not find it to be a good movie. The movie was appreciated for brilliant direction. Critics believed the movie to have very catchy plot even though the story proceeds very slowly. The movie also received appreciation for its comic timing and rapid turn of events.

== Music ==
No.	Title	Lyrics	Music	Singer(s)	Length
1.	"Kathmandu Ma"	Bikash Silwal, Bimal Gautam	Bikash Silwal	Dharmendra Sewan	3:28
2.	"Prastav"	Kiran Baral	Bikash Silwal	Bikash Silwal, Prabisha Adhikari	4:48
3.	"Ghintang Ghisi Twak"	Bikash Silwal	Bikash Silwal	Karma Shakya, Bikash Silwal, Dharmendra Sewan	2:32
Total length:					22:18

== See also ==
- Karma
- Saugat Malla
