= Shambhala (2024 film) =

2024 film by Min Bahadur Bham

- Festival release poster
- Directed by: Min Bahadur Bham
- Written by: Min Bahadur Bham; Abinash Bikram Shah
- Produced by: Debaki Rai; Justine O.; Bibhakar Sunder Shakya; Shuk Fong Chong; Verona Meier; Catherine Dussart; Zeynep Koray
- Starring: Thinley Lhamo; Sonam Topden; Tenzin Dalha
- Cinematography: Aziz Zhambakiyiv
- Edited by: Kiran Shrestha; Liao Ching-sung
- Music by: Nhyoo Bajracharya
- Animation by: Bijay Awale
- Production companies: Shooney Films; CDP; Ape&Bjørn; Aaru Production; ZK Film, Istanbul; Yi Tiao Long Hu Bao; Bangdel & Shakya Production
- Release date: 23 February 2024 (Berlinale)
- Running time: 150 minutes
- Countries: Nepal; France; Norway; Hong Kong; China; Turkey; Taiwan; United States; Qatar
- Languages: Tibetan; Nepali
- Budget: रू15 crore (equivalent to ₹0.00 or US$0.00 in 2026)
- Box office: रू2.5 crore (equivalent to ₹0.00 or US$0.00 in 2026) - रू5 crore (equivalent to ₹0.00 or US$0.00 in 2026)

Shambhala is a 2024 drama film directed by Min Bahadur Bham from a screenplay written by Bham and Abinash Bikram Shah. Starring Thinley Lhamo, Tenzin Dalha and Sonam Topden. Shambhala is the most expensive movie of Nepal made on the budget रू15 crore (equivalent to ₹0.00 or US$0.00 in 2026). It was selected in the Competition at the 74th Berlin International Film Festival, where it competed for the Golden Bear. Set in Nepal’s Upper Dolpo, the film follows Pema, a pregnant woman from a Tibetan-speaking Buddhist Himalayan community, as she searches for her missing husband. A task which she has to do amidst being pregnant under challenging precarious circumstances.

The international co-production between Nepal, France, Norway, Hong Kong, China, Turkey, Taiwan, USA and Qatar world-premiered on 23 February 2024 at the Berlinale Palast. Shambhala is the first Nepali-language feature film to be in competition at a major film festival and the first South Asian film in three decades to compete in the main competition at the Berlinale. The film was also selected as the Nepalese entry for Best International Feature Film at the 97th Academy Awards.

== Plot ==
Pema, a young, newly married woman, lives in a polyandrous village in the Nepalese Himalayas (Note: In the Tsum Valley in the Himalayas, fraternal polyandry (in which two or more brothers are married to the same wife) is still common.) with her husband Tashi and his two brothers, Karma and Dawa, who are also her husbands. Their life is peaceful until Tashi disappears on a months long trade trip to Lhasa, and newly-pregnant Pema's fidelity is doubted by her neighbours. She decides to go after Tashi to clear her name and show her devotion. She is joined by Karma, one of her husbands (brother of Tashi) who is also a monk. Karma initially struggles to adapt to the worldly life, but he soon learns to enjoy it and to care for Pema. However, he has to return to his monastery after the death of the Rinpoche (head of the monastery), and Pema continues alone. Her journey is not only about finding Tashi, but also about finding herself and her freedom. She grows more spiritual and enlightened with every step. In the end, Pema returns to her village and confronts the returned Tashi, standing up for herself and her life. Her child is revealed as the reincarnation of the Rinpoche.

== Cast ==
- Thinley Lhamo as Pema
- Sonam Topden as Karma
- Tenzin Dalha as Tashi
- Karma Wangyal Gurung as Dawa
- Karma Shakya as Ram sir
- Loten Namling as the Rinpoche
- Tsering Lhamo Gurung as Pema's friend
- Janga Bahadur Lama as shepherd

== Production ==
The film was shot in the Upper Dolpo region of the Himalayas, between Nepal and Tibet, one of the highest human settlements on the planet located between 4,200 to 6,000 meters above sea level. Min Bahadur Bham planned to direct his second directorial venture as a full-fledged female-driven survival road film. The film eventually obtained script development funding from ACF and from Cannes' Cinéfondation Residence as well as from the Busan International Film Festival. The film was initially titled as A Year of Cold (Chiso Barsha).

In 2018, the director Min Bahadur Bham received 6,000 Euros at the Locarno Film Festival and the film was co-produced with the support of Locarno’s Open Doors Hub. The film script was conferred with the Norwegian Sorfond Award in 2019 after being shortlisted among the contenders to receive the grant under the Norwegian South Film Fund's pitching forum.

At the 72nd Cannes Film Festival, the filmmaker received 60,000 US dollars as a special cash prize to engage in the execution of the script by converting the script into a full-length feature film. The film also received a special cash prize of 75,000 Euros from the TRT 12 Punto Script Lab of Turkey for its script.

== Release ==
Shambhala had its world premiere on 23 February 2024, as part of the 74th Berlin International Film Festival, in Competition.

In January 2024, Brussels-based Best Friend Forever acquired the sales rights of the film.

The film was featured in 'Features' section of the 71st Sydney Film Festival on June 13, 2024. The film was also screened in 'Horizons' at the 58th Karlovy Vary International Film Festival on 28 June 2024. It was also showcased at Piazza Grande in the 77th Locarno Film Festival on 12 August 2024. It will be screened in 'Vanguard' at the 2024 Vancouver International Film Festival on 2 October 2024. It will also be presented in 'Strands: Journey' section of the 2024 BFI London Film Festival on 15 October 2024.

The film was selected for the MAMI Mumbai Film Festival 2024, where competed in the South Asia Competition section and received a special mention from the NETPAC jury.

== Reception ==
On the review aggregator Rotten Tomatoes website, the film has an approval rating of 89% based on 9 reviews, with an average rating of 6.8/10.

Fabien Lemercier reviewing the film at Berlinale for Cineuropa wrote, "A magnificent portrait of a woman determined to shoulder her responsibilities, Shambhala is a work of great sensitivity which is highly suggestive beneath its striking and “exotic” cultural attire."

James Mottram of South China Morning Post rated the film 4/5 and lauded the film's writing, "A film like no other, Shambhala is unhurried and reflects the director’s fascination with Eastern rituals and symbols."

Siddhant Adlakha reviewing for Variety at Berlinale wrote, "Shambhala does, essentially, what it says on the tin. Its landscape may be mountainous, but its emotional trajectory is a distinct plateau."

Jonathan Romney reviewing the film at Berlinale, wrote in ScreenDaily "At once a spiritual odyssey and a more concrete journey of female self-determination, this is a visually magnificent slow-burner filmed high in the Himalayas, with a quietly magnetic central performance from Thinley Lhamo."

Nicholas Bell in Ion Cinema rated the film with four stars and said, "Grounding this narrative, mixing visual poetry with vulgar slander, is the captivating performance by Thinley Lhamo, who imbues Pema with a resilience and tenderness." Concluding, Bell praised cinematography and wrote, "Bam reunites with his DP Aziz Zhambakyiv, and the Nepalese Himalayas provide a pristine, breathtaking backdrop for these ultimately petty miseries supported by fragile men."

== Accolades ==
The film was selected in Competition at the 74th Berlin International Film Festival, thus it was nominated to compete for the Golden Bear award.

Award	Date	Category	Recipient	Result	Ref.
Berlin International Film Festival	25 February 2024	Golden Bear	Min Bahadur Bham	Nominated	
MAMI Mumbai Film Festival	24 October 2024	South Asia Competition	Min Bahadur Bham	Nominated	
Taipei Golden Horse Awards	23 November 2024	Best Cinematography	Aziz Zhambakiyev	Nominated	
Taipei Golden Horse Awards	23 November 2024	Best Makeup & Costume Design	Ramlal Khadka	Nominated	
Asia Pacific Screen Awards	30 November 2024	Cultural Diversity Award	Min Bahadur Bham	Won	
Asian Film Awards	16 March 2025	Best Costume Design	Dorjee Dradhul Gurung	Nominated	
Asian Film Awards	16 March 2025	Best Cinematography	Aziz Zhambakiyev	Nominated	

== See also ==
- List of submissions to the 97th Academy Awards for Best International Feature Film
- List of Nepalese submissions for the Academy Award for Best International Feature Film
