= Khangri: The Mountain =

Khangri (The Mountain)
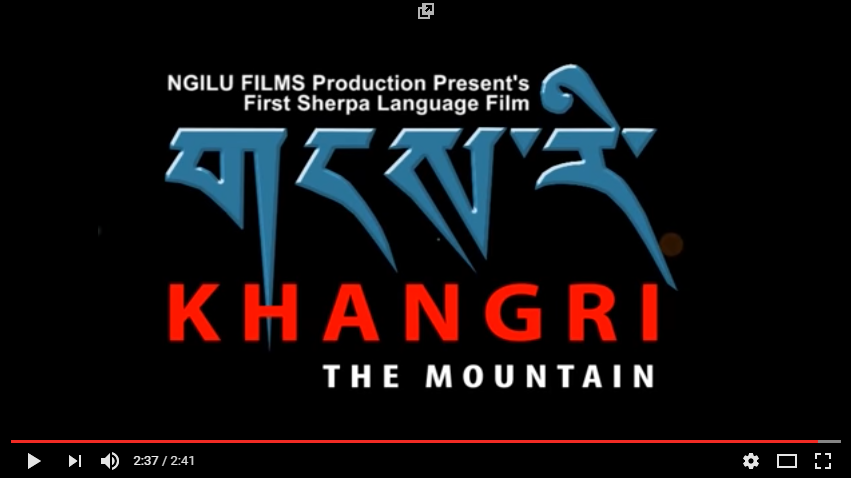
- Title screen
- Directed by: Nabin Subba
- Produced by: Sunder Joshi, Ang Phurba Dragthowa
- Starring: Samdey Sherpa (Bsam gtan shar pa)
- Production company: NGILU FILMS Production
- Release date: 1996 (2052 Bs)
- Country: Nepal
- Language: Sherpa

Khangri or Gangri (literally: The Snowy Mountain) (Sherpa: གངས་རི།, Wylie: Gangs ri) is the first Sherpa language movie which was released in 2052 Bs (1996) in Nepal.

== Synopsis ==
Pemba, who used to climb, returns to his native village Khumbu, in the foothills of Everest, after spending ten years abroad. To his surprise he finds tremendous changes have taken place due to tourism and mountaineering. One-day Pemba goes to the Tengboche Monastery to pray and to his amazement he meets his old girlfriend Yangjin dressed as a Buddhist nun. Deeply distressed, Pemba promises to meet her again and then he goes to Namche Bazaar where he finds Lhakpa Doma, the wife of an old colleague whose husband died in a mountaineering accident, which Pemba survived. Pasang, the widow's only son, wishes to follow in his father's footsteps and his mother asks Pemba to come to her house and dissuade Pasang from joining the expedition to Everest. A few days later Pemba hears that Pasang has climbed Everest and, it great joy, he rushes to the house of Pasang's mother to give her the news. On the way he learns that Pasang was caught in an avalanche and that his body has been recovered and cremated. It is the end of a Sherpa dynasty. Pemba is now convinced that the changes in the Sherpas' life and society are inevitable and that tourism and mountaineering have brought many benefits to the Khumbu region.

== See also ==
- List of media related to Mount Everest
