= Dalan Drama =

- Genre: Cultural
- Based on: socio-cultural transformation of Nepal
- Directed by: Nabin Subba
- Theme music composer: Pratima Sunam and Narendra Pyasi
- Opening theme: Shrawan Mukarung
- Ending theme: Shrawan Mukarung
- Country of origin: Nepal
- Original language: Nepali
- No. of episodes: 52

Production
- Production locations: Baglung, Kushma,Kathmandu, Nepal
- Cinematography: Siddhartha Shakya, Mohan Shah
- Editors: Shiva Puri, Tshering Rhitar Sherpa
- Camera setup: Multiple Camera
- Running time: 25 Minutes

Original release
- Network: Nepal Television

Dalan Drama is a Nepali TV series which display the socio-cultural transformation of Nepal, during 1951 to 1995, from the view point of Dalit. It is directed by Nabin Subba.
