= Kisa Gotami =

Disciple of Buddha

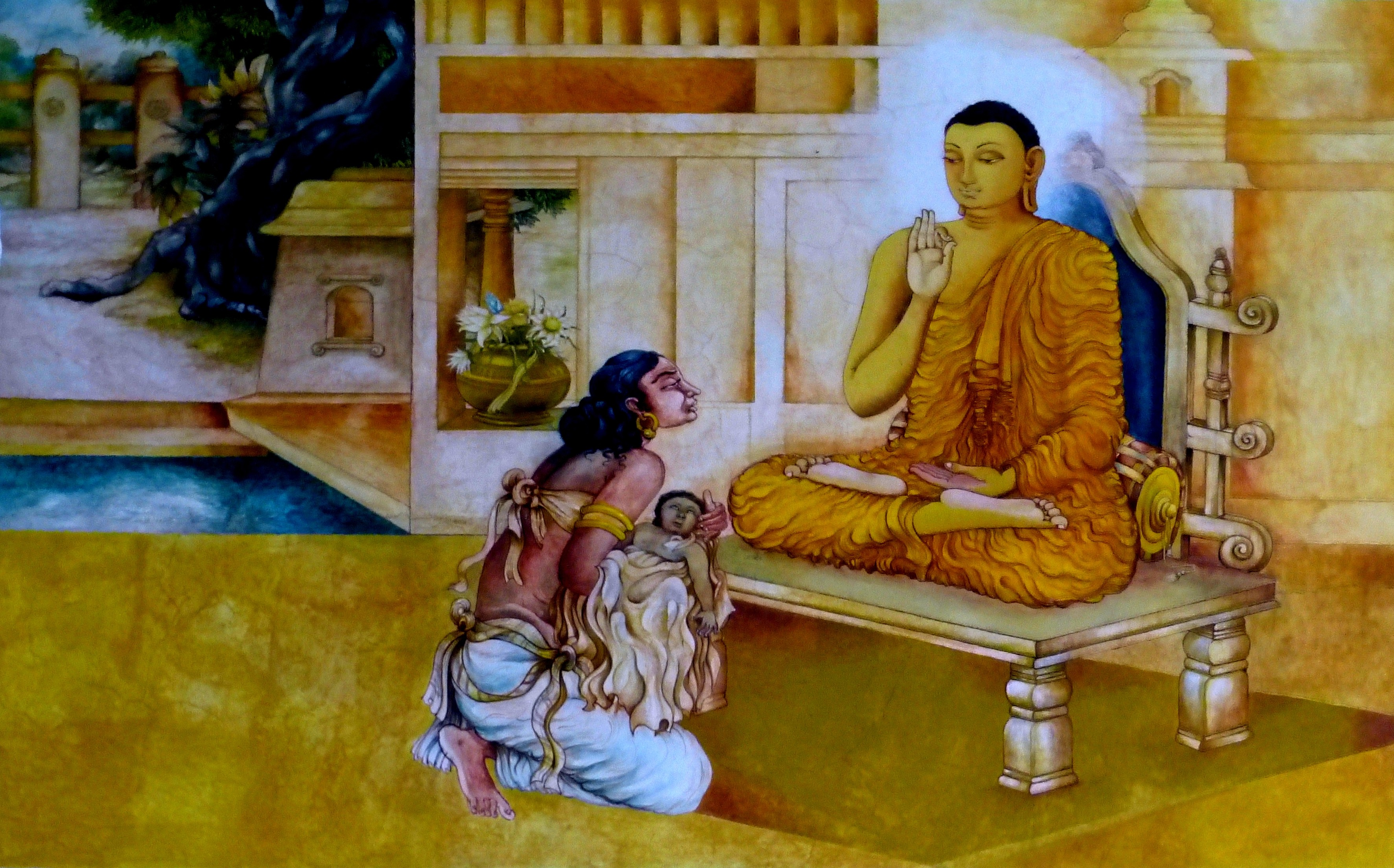
Kisa Gotami before Buddha

Kṛśā Gautamī (Sanskrit: कृशा गौतमी; Pali: Kisā Gotamī) was the wife of a wealthy man of Shravasti. Her story is one of the most famous ones in Buddhism.

After losing her only child, Kisa Gotami became desperate and asked if anyone could help her. Her sorrow was so great that many thought she had lost her mind.

After some time, an old man told her to see the Buddha. The Buddha told her that he could bring the child back to life if she could find white mustard seeds from a family where no one had died. She desperately went from house to house in search of such a case, but to her disappointment, she could not find a house that had not suffered the death of a family member. Finally, the realization struck her that there is no house free from mortality. She returned to the Buddha, who comforted her and preached the Dharma to her.

She became awakened and entered the first stage of enlightenment and eventually became an arhat. The Buddha appointed her foremost in discipline among the bhikṣuṇīs.

== Theravada ==
The following Dhammapada verse (in Pali and English) is associated with her story:

Yo ca vassasataṁ jīve,
apassaṁ amataṁ padaṁ;
Ekāhaṁ jīvitaṁ seyyo,
passato amataṁ padaṁ.

Though one should live a hundred years
without seeing the Deathless State,
yet better indeed, is a single day's life
of one who sees the Deathless State.

In the "Gotami Sutta" (SN 5.3), Bhikkhuni Kisa Gotami declares:

I've gotten past the killing of [my] sons,
have made that the end
to [my search for] men.
I don't grieve,
I don't weep....
It's everywhere destroyed — delight.
The mass of darkness is shattered.
Having defeated the army of death,
free of fermentations I dwell.

Happy indeed is the mother
Happy indeed is the father
Happy indeed is the wife
Who is a lord so glorious

The story is the source of the popular aphorism: "The living are few, but the dead are many".

A literary tradition has evolved round the story of Kisa Gotami, much of it in oral form and in local plays in much of Asia. The Therigatha (or "Verses of the Elder Nuns") in the Pali Canon recounts a version of the story. A number of popular similar alternative versions also exist. A similar story is told about the Greek philosopher Demonax, who promised a person he can summon his deceased son's shadow if provided with three names of people who never had to mourn in their lives.

== In popular culture ==
The story of Kisa Gotami is recited by Australian musician Nick Cave in the song "Hollywood" by Nick Cave and the Bad Seeds from their seventeenth studio album, Ghosteen (2019).

The kids animated television series Bluey tells a very similar story in the season 1 episode "Bumpy and the Wise Old Wolf Hound".

The story of Kisa Gotami is recited in the eponymous episode 5, "The Parable of Kisa Gotami", of Thai Cave Rescue.

The story of Kisa is part of NCERT Class X English syllabus as Sermon at Benares.

== Bibliography ==
- Buddharakkhita, Acharya (1998). Sahassavagga: The Thousands (Dhp VIII). Available on-line at http://www.accesstoinsight.org/tipitaka/kn/dhp/dhp.08.budd.html.
- Thanissaro Bhikkhu (trans.) (1998). Gotami Sutta: Sister Gotami (SN 5.3). Available on-line at http://www.accesstoinsight.org/tipitaka/sn/sn05/sn05.003.than.html.
- C. Rhys Davids and K. Norman: Poems of Early Buddhist Nuns, Pali Text Society, pp. 88–9. Retaken at: https://web.archive.org/web/20110514084000/http://mindfulnessmethod.wordpress.com/articles/kisa-gotami/
- Wendy Garling (2016), Stars at Dawn: Forgotten Stories of Women in the Buddha's Life, Shambhala Publications, pp. 95–106.
