= Sudhir Shrestha =

Nepalese Actor and Model

- सुधीर श्रेष्ठ
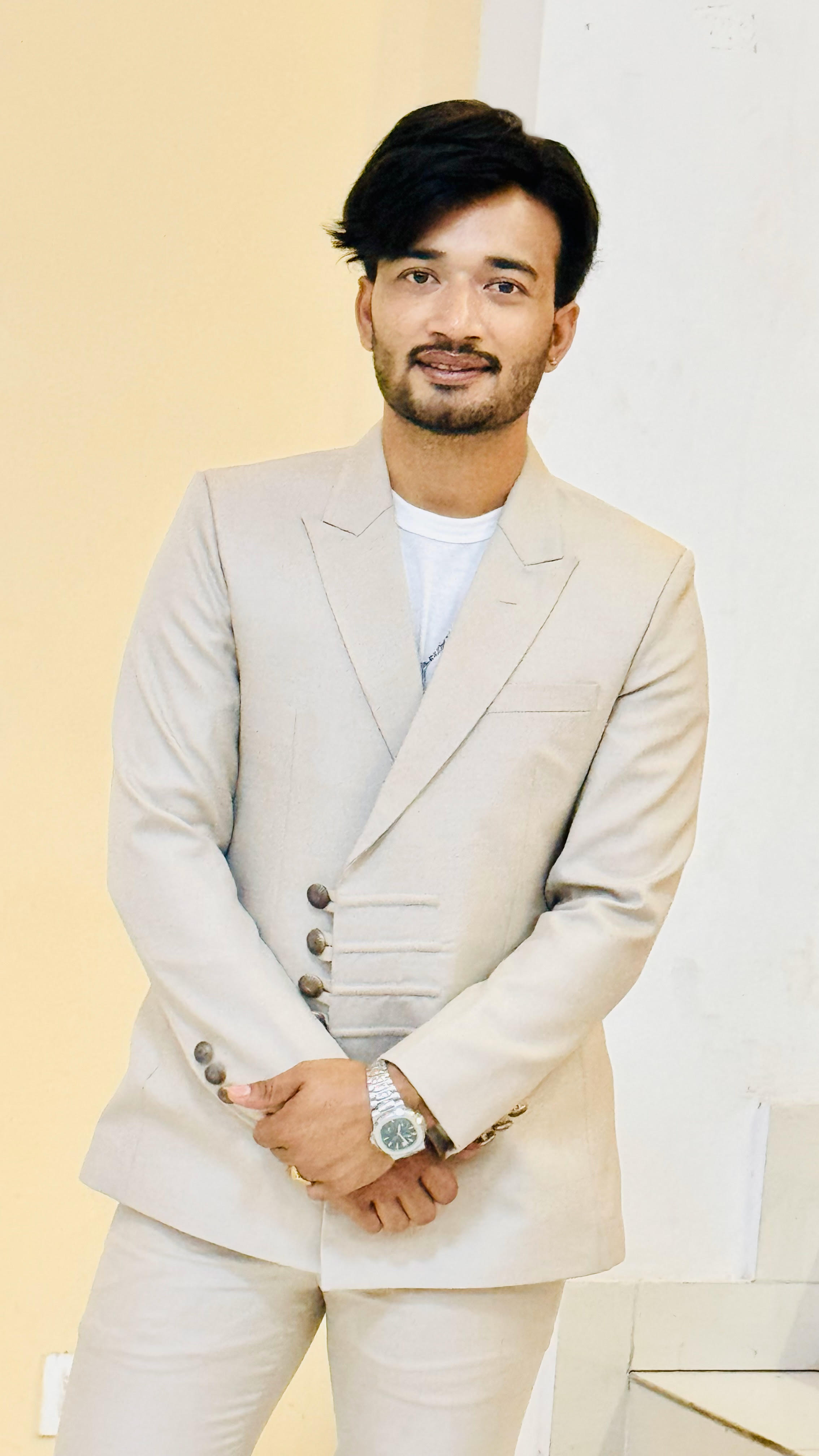
- Born: 3 May; Myagdi Nepal
- Other names: Indra Bahadur shrestha
- Citizenship: Nepalese
- Occupation: Actor/Model
- Years active: 2013AD -present
- Known for: Naboli Naboli

Sudhir Shrestha (Nepali:सुधीर श्रेष्ठ ) is a Nepalese actor and model. He was born on 3 May in the Myagdi District of Nepal. He is known for the Nepali music video "Naboli Naboli".

Shrestha started his modeling career in 2013 AD as assistant choreographer and cameo artist. "Naboli Naboli," "Kura katne manche," "Doori Majboori," and "Ghumti ma rail" are some popular music videos on his career. He has acted in more than 200 music videos. Shrestha has been awarded different national award, like the Star Music Award and the Himalayan International Award.

== Award ==
SN	Award Title	Award Category	Notable Work	Result	Ref
1	3rd Himalayan International award 2023	Best Model Make (Folk Song)	Noulo Chinjani	Won	
2	2nd star Music Video Award 2023	Best Modern Male Model (Popular)	Maya Base Basla saili	won	
3	Nepal Best Music Award 2021	Best Pop Model male		won	

== Music videos ==
SN	Music Video	Credit	ref
1	Testai Testaima		
2	Naboli	Model	
3	Kura Katne Manche		
4	Doori Majboori	Model	
5	Ghumtima rail		
6	Yo Tiharma		
7	Kto Ali Kamaune hos	Model	
8	Maya Naini Taal	Model	
9	Cyclema	Model	
10	Man Paraune Hajarau Chhan	Model	
11	Galti Bhaye	Model	
12	Kahile Maya Dekhayau	Model	
13	Angrejima Banana	Model	
14	Ok Chha Ta	Model	
15	Dadai Pipal	Model	
16	Thekiko Madani	Model	
17	maya garna Lai	Model	
18	Siriri Batas	Model	
19	He Maya	Model	
20	Timro Man	Model	
21	Meri Maya	Model	
