= Sano Sansar =

Sano Sansar (Small World)
- Theatrical poster
- Directed by: Alok Nembang
- Written by: Mohammad Hanif
- Produced by: Nakim Uddin; Rajesh Siddhi; Bhaskar Dhungana
- Starring: Namrata Shrestha; Neer Shah; Karma; Jiwan Luitel
- Release date: 12 September 2008 (Nepal)
- Country: Nepal
- Language: Nepali

Sano Sansar (Nepali: सानो संसार, translation: Small World) is a 2008 Nepali romantic comedy film directed by Alok Nembang. The film has a massive star cast which includes Neer Shah and newcomers Mahesh Shakya (popularly known Karma), Jiwan Luitel and Namrata Shrestha. Sano Sansar is director Alok Nembang's directorial debut and is the second Nepali HD movie made after Kagbeni. The film is heavily influenced by the Korean movie My Sassy Girl and the English-language movie You've Got Mail. In 2021, Sano Sansar was shown again in theaters after COVID-19 lockdown ended in the country, it was after 13 years of its official release date it was shown again in some of the theaters. They took this decision in order to bring back audience to the theaters, because producers were not ready to release their unreleased films in fear of losing potential audience, since they were unsure if people are ready to attend theater after long pandemic.

== Cast ==
- Karma Shakya: Ravi
- Jiwan Luitel: Siza
- Namrata Shrestha: Reetu
- Vinay Shrestha: Suraj
- Sushila Rayamajhi: Sarita
- Neer Shah: Police Officer
- Arjun Shrestha: Dr. Chandra Thapa
- Puskar Gurung: Lodge Owner
- Bholaraj Sapkota: Go-kart Mechanic

== Soundtrack ==
No.	Title	Singer(s)	Length
1.	"Sano Cha Gau"	Babu Bogati	5:29
2.	"Sayad Maya Ma"	Swaroop Raj Acharya, Satya Raj Acharya	5:43
3.	"Maya Ma Yestai Hunchha"	Anil Singh, Rima Gurung Hoda	3:07
4.	"Yo Duri"	Jagdish Samaal	2:55
5.	"Kanchhi Mori"	Babu Bogati	4:13
6.	"Samjhauta"	Rima Gurung Hoda	4:07

== Reception ==
Sano Sansar was able to leave its mark on Nepali audiences that had begun to avoid Nepali language films due to its incomparable reputation with films from other industries. Because of that, audiences were leaning more towards Hindi language films (Bollywood). Despite having to face this challenge, Sano Sansar was able to perform very well in box office, in fact it was able to make record by earning 6.25 lakh Nepalese rupees within eight days of release.

Sano Sansar was received with positive reviews. Kathmandu Post gave very good ratings calling it "a great relief from the all time dhisum dhisum fight scenes and ghintang ghintang rhythmic songs of Nepali films".

The musical aspect of this film was also highly appreciated and the title track composed by Sachin Singh and sung by Babu Bogati became highly popular among youngsters.

== See also ==
- Cinema of Nepal
- List of Nepalese films
