= Alok Nembang =

Nepalese film director

- Born: 1973
- Died: 6 November 2014 (aged 40–41); Dhapasi, Kathmandu, Nepal
- Occupations: Film director, Music video director, VJ, Actor

Alok Nembang was a Nepali film director. He was also a well-known music video director in Nepal for more than a decade.

== Career ==
After returning to Nepal from the United States, where he gained knowledge about theater and film-making, Alok directed over 500 music videos of Nepali music. He began his career as a VJ in Image Channel in Nepal in 1998. His debut music video was Lakhau Patak by Nabin K. Bhattarai. Alok acted in the Limbu language film Numafung in 2004. His passion for making films was fulfilled with the production of Sano Sansar (2008), which was a big hit. Alok's second directorial venture Kohi Mero (2010) made him popular among the Nepalese cinema audience. His third film Ajhai Pani was released in February 2015 after his death.

== Death ==
On 6 November 2014, Alok was found dead at his home in Kathmandu in an apparent suicide.

== Filmography ==
- Numafung (2004) - cast
- Sano Sansar (2008) - director
- Kohi Mero (2010) - director
- Ajhai Pani (2015) - director
