= Pooja Sharma (Nepalese actress) =

Nepalese actress

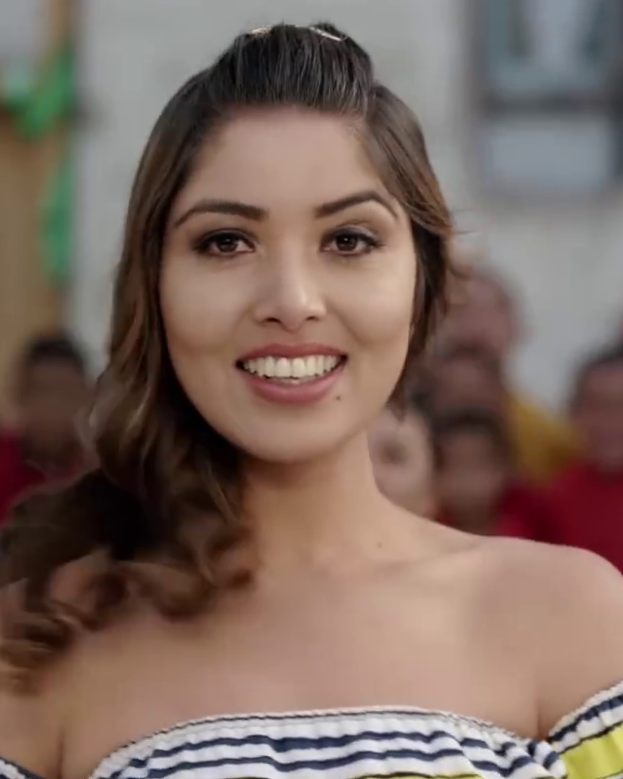
- Pooja Sharma in 2017
- Born: April 30, 1992 (age 34); Sindhupalchok District, Nepal
- Education: Kathmandu Academy for Tourism and Hospitality
- Occupations: Actress; model; producer
- Years active: 2010–present
- Known for: Prem Geet (2016 film)

Pooja Sharma (born April 30, 1992, in Sindhupalchowk, Nepal) is a Nepalese actress, producer and also singer known for her work in the Nepalese film industry. Sharma debuted as an actress in 3 Lovers (2012) where she appeared as a supporting actress. She appeared in the leading role in Madhumash, alongside actor Aaryan Sigdel. Sharma gained recognition after her role in Ajhai Pani. The turning point in her career came from the movie Prem Geet, which she co-starred in with Pradeep Khadka. Since then, she has starred in Ma Yesto Geet Gauchhu opposite Paul Shah, which was also her first production venture. Her next film was Ramkahani, a multistarrer directed by Sudarshan Thapa.

== Filmography ==
Year	Title	Role	Notes
2012	Three Lovers	Supporting role	Film debut
2013	Madhumash	Lead actress	Opposite Aaryan Sigdel
2015	Ajhai Pani	Yunisha	Final film of director Alok Nembang
2015	Chankhe Shankhe Pankhe	Purnima	—
2016	Prem Geet	Geet	Breakthrough role opposite Pradeep Khadka
2017	Ma Yesto Geet Gauchhu	Chhayan	Also produced
2017	Mero Best Friend		Special appearance
2018	Ram Kahani	Maya	—
2019	Samhalinchha Kahile Man	Shreya	—
2019	Poi Paryo Kale	Pooja	—
2022	Ma Yesto Geet Gauchu‑2	Chhayan	—
2022	Saamjhana Birsana	—	—
2022	Samhalinchha Kahile Man	—	Possibly rerelease or sequel
2024	Daanvi	—	Acted in featuring films in 2024
2024	Rawayan	—	Also credited as producer
