= Rajaram Poudel =

Nepalese comedian and actor (born 1956)

- Born: December 29, 1956 (age 69)
- Occupations: Comedian; Actor
- Years active: 1982-present

Rajaram Poudel is a Nepalese comedian and actor who is known for his works in Nepali cinema. He began his career in 1982, and has acted in more than hundred Nepali films.

== Filmography ==
| Year | Title | Role | Notes | Ref. |
|---|---|---|---|---|
| 1982 | Basudev | | | |
| 1990 | Lobhi Papi | | | |
| 1991 | Tapsya | | | |
| 1995 | Prem Pinda | | | |
| 1995 | Ragat | | | |
| 1997 | Balidaan | | | |
| 2000 | Basanti | Pandit | | |
| 2016 | Tuyumati | | Newari film | |
| 2019 | Daal Bhaat Tarkari | | also producer | |

=== Television ===
| Year | Title | Role | Notes | Ref. |
|---|---|---|---|---|
| | 216777 | Kaanchha | | |
| | Santati Ko Lagi | Mistri | | |
| 1989 | Pandhra Gatey | Krishna Prasad | | |
| | Oh-ho...! | | | |
| | Sur Besur | | | |
| 2003-2015 | Jire Khursani | Thulo buwa | | |
| 2016-2018 | Brake Fail | Leader | | |
| 2022 | Rajaram Niwas | Rajaram Sharma | | |

== Awards and nominations ==
| Year | Award | Category | Role | Film | Result |
|---|---|---|---|---|---|
| 2018 | Kamana Awards | Best Comedian | | Ma Yesto Geet Gauchu | Nominated |
| 2019 | Kamana Awards | Best Performance in Comic Role | | Badha Mayale | Nominated |
| 2020 | Bhairab Puraskar Guthi | Bhairab Genius Award | | | Won |
