= Min Bahadur Bham =

Nepalese film director

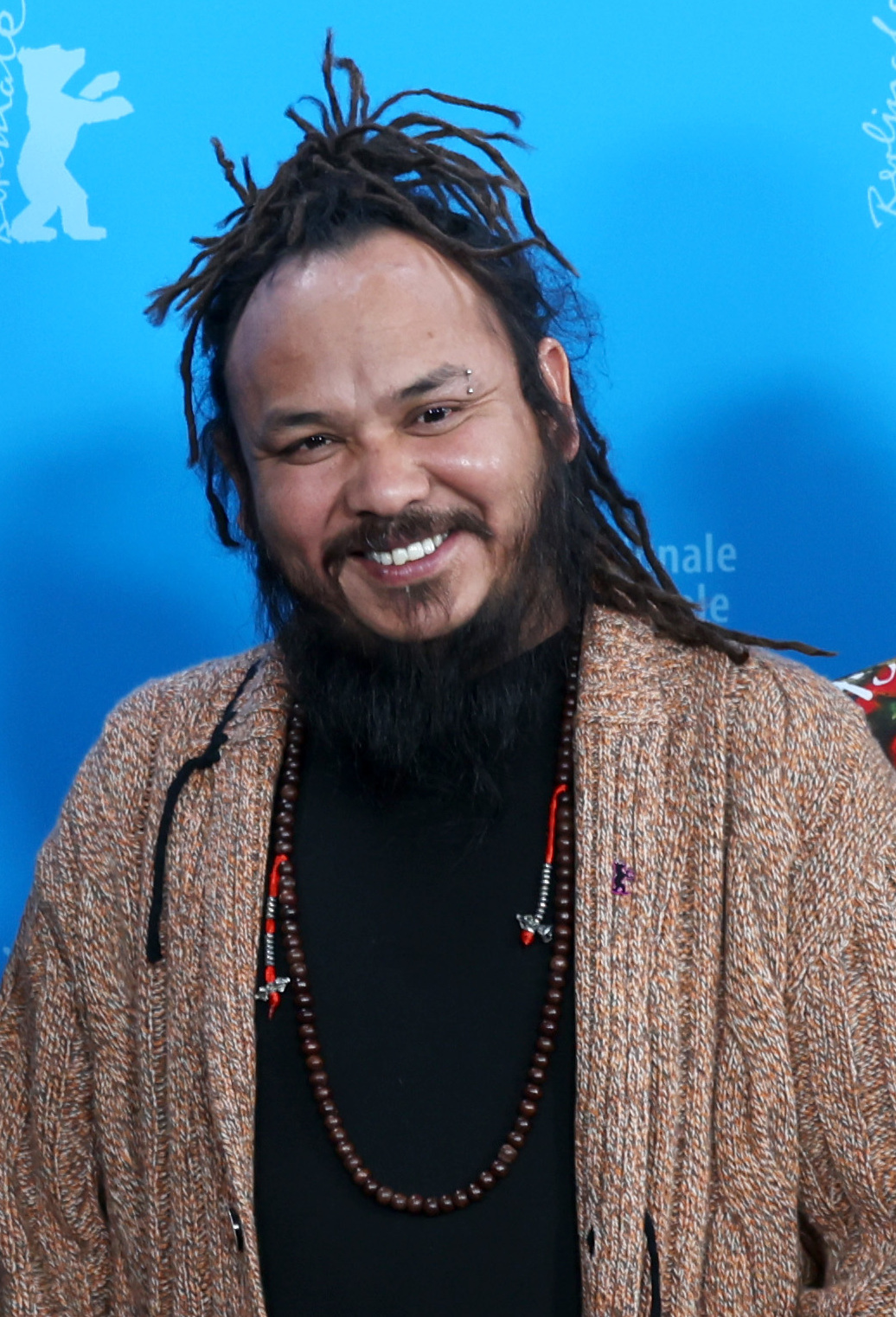
Bham in 2026

Min Bahadur Bham is a distinguished filmmaker at the vanguard of Nepal's "New Wave" cinema, whose work is characterized by a quiet devotion to the authentic spirit of the Himalayas. His creative vision is deeply informed by his multi-disciplinary academic background, holding a bachelor's degree in literature and Filmmaking, a master's degree in political science and Buddhist Philosophy, and he is currently a Doctoral candidate in Visual Anthropology.

His cinematic journey began with the short film The Flute (2012), which achieved the milestone of being the first Nepali film to screen at the Venice Film Festival. His debut feature, The Black Hen (2015), received the FEDEORA Best Film Award at Venice and was selected as Nepal's official entry for the Academy Awards. His second feature, SHAMBHALA (2024), made history as the first South Asian film in four decades to compete for the Golden Bear at the Berlinale. It further distinguished itself as the first Nepali film to grace Locarno's Piazza Grande, where it received the Cultural Diversity Award at the Asia Pacific Screen Awards and marked his second submission to the Oscars.

Beyond his personal filmography, Min is a dedicated mentor and producer committed to nurturing emerging voices across Nepal, Hong Kong, and broader Asia. His collaborative efforts as a producer have been honored at major festivals, including Venice, Berlin, San Sebastian, Rotterdam, and Busan. He frequently serves the global cinematic community as a jury member, script consultant, and mentor in international labs spanning from Korea and Kazakhstan to the United States. He was invited to serve as a Jury Member for the Main Competition at the Berlin International Film Festival, 2026.

Currently, he is developing his 3rd feature film, The Last Stanza of Breath.

== Filmography ==
Year	Title	Notes	Ref(s)
2012	Bansulli (The Flute)	Venice Horizons YouTube Award – Nominated	
2015	Serdhak(The Golden Hill)	Short Film Competition at 69th Venice International Film Festival Selected in 20+ film festivals, winning 8 awards	
2015	The Black Hen	National Film Award for Best Writer – Won; National Film Award for Best Movie – Won; Venice Film Festival's Fedeora Award – Won	
2016	JHALO(Year of the Bird)		
2019	A Year of Cold	Cannes Film Festival's Norwegian Sorfond Award	
2024	Shambhala	Berlin International Film Festival's Golden Bear – Nominated; MAMI Mumbai Film Festival's South Asia Competition – Nominated; Official Nepalese entry for Best International Feature Film for 97th Academy Awards	
