= Nabin Subba =

Nepalese film director

- नबिन सुब्बा लिम्बु
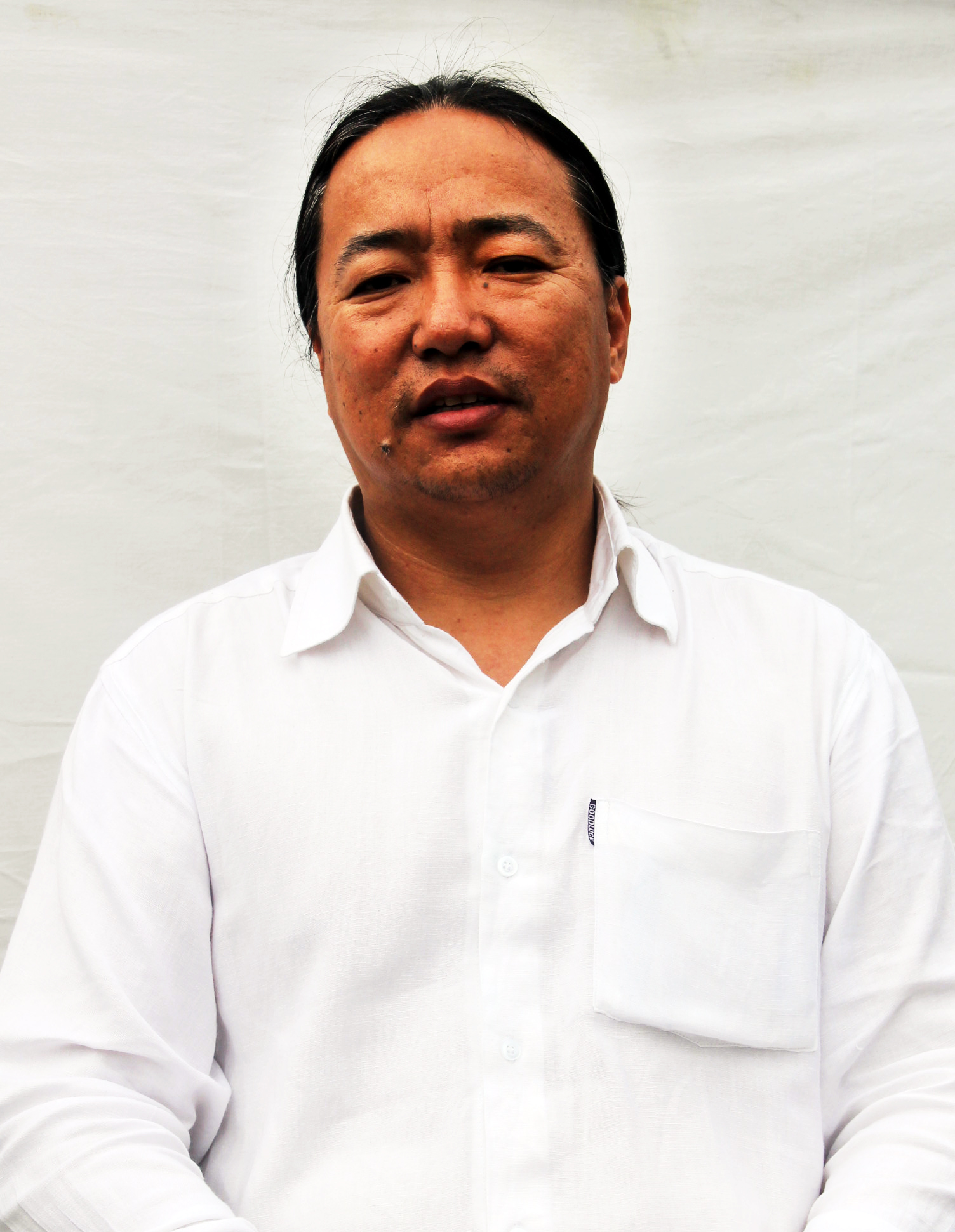
- Born: December 14, 1967 (age 58); Taplejung
- Notable work: Director

Nabin Subba (Limbu) (born 14 December 1967) is a Nepalese film director, screenwriter and producer. Known for his focus on the Nepalese indigenous community, he is recognized as one of the pioneer of the independent film movement in Nepalese cinema. He started with writing and directing plays. He emerged as a prominent Nepalese director in 2002 with his highly praised feature film Numafung, establishing himself as a leading figure in the industry. His subsequent works, including the 52 episode TV series Dalan about Dalits (the untouchables in Nepal) aired at NTV in 2008/2009. It was one of the most popular series in the history of Nepal television, and was nominated for one world media trust, UK for Outstanding Work on Social Issue in Developing Countries. His third feature film Goodbye Kathmandu solidified his reputation as an auteur. He has also dedicated considerable time to nurturing emerging talents.

Nabin Subba is among the first Nepali filmmakers to participate in international film festivals as his debut film Khangri (1996) won special mention at the Trento International Mountain Film Festival, Italy followed by the Prize of the Jury at Propad International Film Festival, Austria and official selection at Telluride International Mountain Film Festival 1997. As of 2023, he returns with his first feature film in seven years, A Road to a Village (गाउँ आएको बाटो) starring Dayahang Rai, Pashupati Rai and Prasan Rai. The film is about the change in father-son relation brought by a newly built road in remote eastern Himalayas of Nepal.

== Career ==
Subba started his career by directing plays for theatre, winning the Best Play of the Year from Royal Nepal Academy in 1988. He also enjoyed a parallel career in journalism and worked as a correspondent for the weekly Nepali Awaj (1989-1992), the daily Nepali Patra (1992-1994) and Deshanter Weekly (1994-1997). He also worked as the editor of the monthly Rup Rang Entertainment (1994-1995) and Nepathya, a theater magazine in 1995. He continues to contribute articles to various newspapers and magazines.

== Notable works ==
- Khangri (The Mountain)
- Numafung
- Goodbye Kathmandu
- A Road to a Village

== TV series ==
- Tareba - He wrote and directed this tele-film for Nepal Television, based on Limbu culture.
- Dalan
- Singha Durbar Season 2
