= Sudarshan Thapa =

Nepali filmmaker (born 1979)

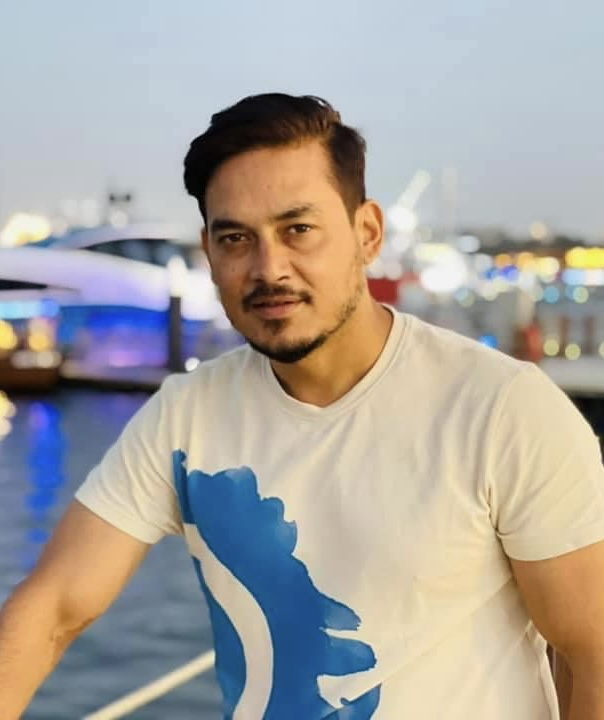
- Born: 6 September 1979 (age 46); Kathmandu, Nepal
- Education: Tribhuvan University
- Occupations: Film producer; film director
- Years active: 2005–present

Sudarshan Thapa is a Nepalese director, actor, screenwriter, dialogue writer and producer who works in Nepali films. He started his career in the Nepali film industry as a director of the hit movie Mero Euta Saathi Chha - a remake of Korean movie Millionaire's First Love, produced by Prabhu Shumsher Jung Bahadur Rana in 2009. His first directorial was a blockbuster that set a new trend for the industry. Since then, there was no turning back and his filmography grew with movies like "Ke yo Maya Ho", "Mero Love Story", "Dhanda", etc. He is basically known for his romantic movies with strong emotional factor. Apart from directing, he also established himself as an actor in the movie "Saathi", Ajhai Pani, "Chankhe Shankhe Pankhe", etc. He is considered as the top director of Nepali film industry.

== Personal life ==
Thapa was born in Kathmandu on 6 September 1979. He completed diploma in film industry before joining the film industry.

== Career ==
Sudarshan Thapa started his reel career from television series. He was a lead actor in ‘Dalan’ series in 2062, which was broadcast on Nepal television and as a director in ‘houseful’ series, which was broadcast in Kantipur television. His debut directorial venture from featured film Mero Euta Saathi Chha.

=== Movies ===
Ramkahani	Director, producer, Story	Sep 07, 2018
Ma Yesto Geet Gauchhu	Director, producer, Story, Screenplay, Dialogue	Jul 14, 2017
Prem Geet	Director, Story	Feb 12, 2016
Chankhe Sankhe Pankhe	Cast, Director	Sep 25, 2015
Ajhai Pani	Cast, Producer	Feb 27, 2015
Madhumas	Director	Oct 25, 2013
Dhanda	Director, producer, Dialogue	Dec 28, 2012
Mero Love Story	Director	Oct 03, 2011
K Yo Maya Ho	Director	Aug 05, 2011
Mero Euta Saathi Chha	Director	Feb 18, 2010
