= Shristi Shrestha =

Nepalese actress and model

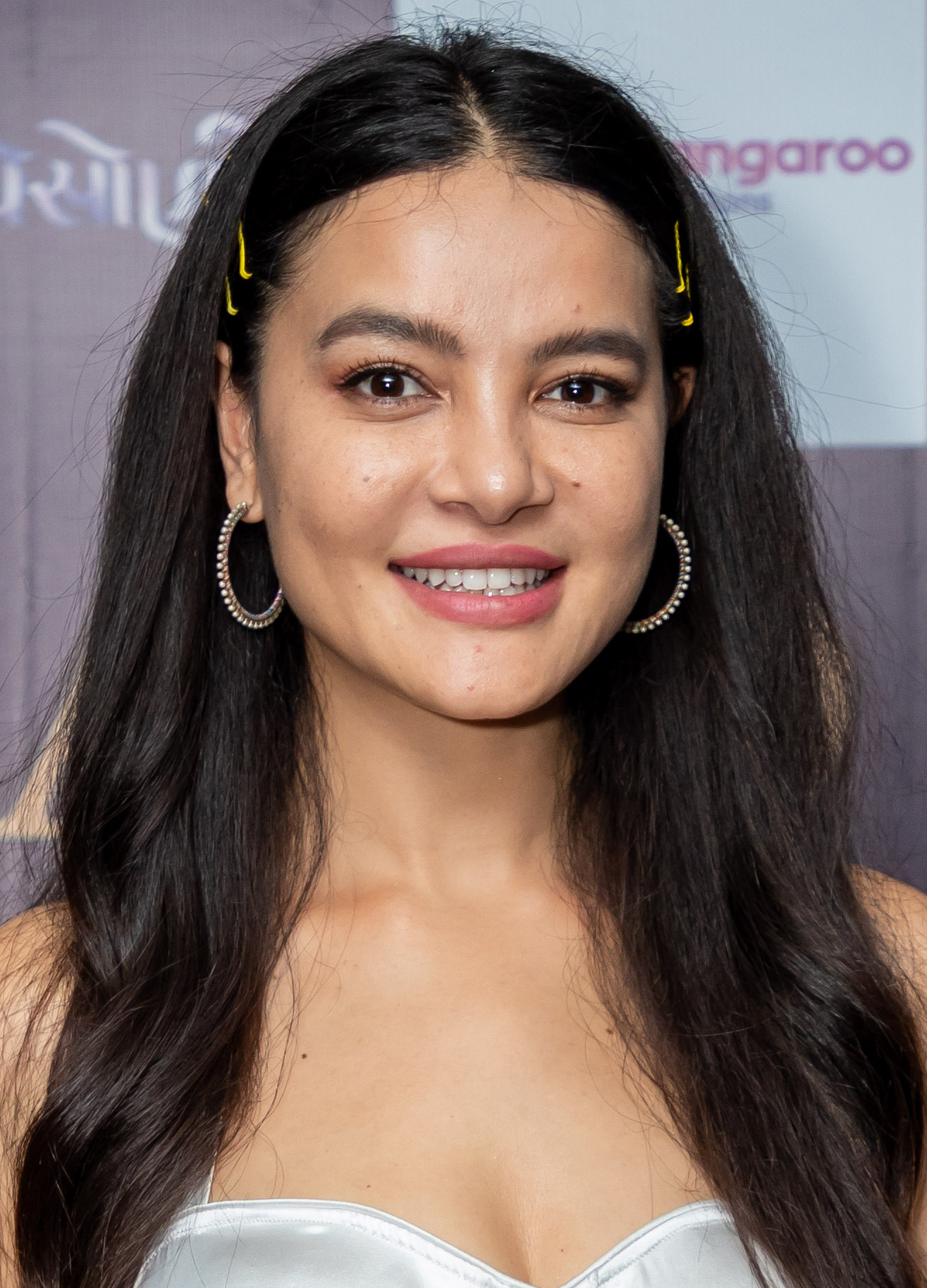
- Shrestha at premier of Chiso Ashtray.
- Born: October 18, 1988 (age 38)
- Partner: Saugat Malla (2016–2023)
- Beauty pageant titleholder
- Title: Miss Chitwan 2012; Miss Nepal World 2012; Miss World 2012 Quarter Finalist (20th Place); Top 10 Beach Beauty Miss World 2012; Top 10 Multimedia Award Miss Nepal 2012; Top 10 Dancers Miss World 2012
- Hair color: Brown
- Eye color: Brown
- Major competitions: Miss Nepal 2012 (Winner); Miss World 2012 (Top 30)

Shristi Shrestha (Nepali: सृष्टि श्रेष्ठ,) is a Nepalese actress, model and beauty pageant titleholder who won the Miss Nepal 2012 pageant.

== Career ==
=== Pageants ===
Shrestha represented her home district of Chitwan during the Miss Nepal 2012 beauty pageant as Miss Chitwan 2012. She won the main title of Miss Nepal as well as the Miss Confidence title.

Shrestha is the first Miss Nepal winner to reach the quarter-finals of Miss World; she finished in 20th place overall, eighth place in Beach Beauty, and was one of the top-10 contestants for the Multimedia Award. She also won the Public Choice Award at the Miss World pageant.

=== Acting ===
She made her acting debut in the Nepali film Gajalu, alongside Anmol K.C. She debuted on stage as Ophelia in a production of William Shakespeare's Hamlet, which was produced by the British Council and directed by Gregory Thomson. It was staged at the Theatre Village in Kathmandu for one month.

== Awards ==
Shrestha has received Best Debut Actor awards from the National Film Awards, the Kamana Film Awards, the Dcine Awards, and the FAAN Awards.

== Personal life ==
Shrestha is the seventh Young Conservation Ambassador for WWF Nepal and is involved with snow leopard conservation projects within the organization. She was in a relationship with Saugat Malla from 2016 to early 2023.

== Filmography ==
=== Music videos ===
Year	Song title	Artist	Notes	Film
2015	"Kabhi Jo Baadal Barse (Unplugged)"	Arijit Singh	Bollywood	Jackpot
2015	"Sadhai Sadhai"	Devika Bandhana		
2017	Shayad	Pawan Rai		
2019	Namana Laaj Yesari	Prakash Timilsina / Jamuna Sharma	Original Vocal: Premdhwoj Pradhan / Usha Mangeskar	
2022	Meri Maya	Indra Lamichhane		
2022	Dui Nayan	Philip Tamang		

=== Films ===
Year	Title	Role	Director	Note
2016	Gajalu	Sujata Shakya	Hem Raj BC	
2018	Romeo & Muna	Muna	Naresh K KC	
2018	Bandha Mayale	Shardha	Shabir Shrestha	
2019	Poi Paryo Kale		Sishir Rana	
2019	Machha Machha		Sunil Gurung	Dance
2022	Chiso Ashtray	Salinta	Dins Palpali	
2022	The Secrets of Radha	Radha	Subarna Thapa	
2022	Michael Adhikari			
2023	The Red Suitcase		Fidel Devkota	

Awards and achievements
Preceded by Malina Joshi (Nepal)	Miss Nepal World; 2012	Succeeded by Ishani Shrestha (Nepal)
