= Coinage of Nepal =

The earliest coin minted in today's territory of Nepal was in Shakya Mahajanapada, along the India–Nepal border at around 500 BCE. Shakya coins were an example of a coin invented in the Indian subcontinent which continued to be used in Nepal alongside India for over 1500 years.

== Coins from Indian Subcontinent ==
=== Post-Maha Janapadas period (c. BCE 600–?) ===
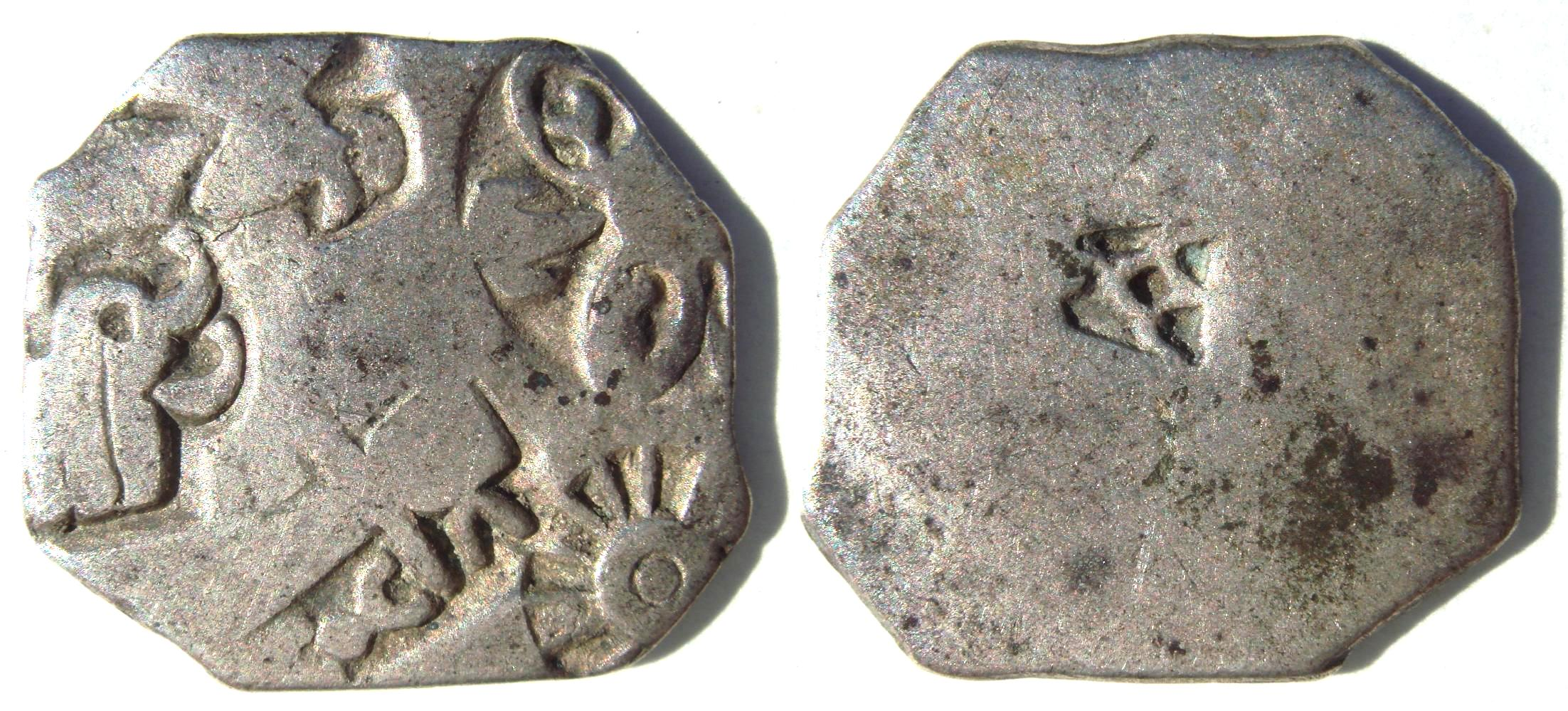
Silver punch mark coin of the Maurya empire, with symbols of wheel and elephant. 3rd century BCE.

In the Maurya Empire, punch marks were widely used in the southern region of Nepal and also imported from hills and the Kathmandu valley. Mauryan coins were punch-marked with the royal standard to ascertain their authenticity.

== Kushan Empires (c. CE 30–375) ==
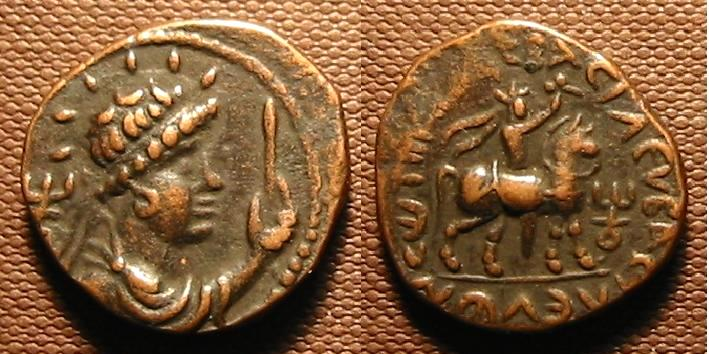
Coin of Kushan King Vima Takto

The Kushan Empire expanded into Nepal in the early 1st century CE and introduced Kushan coins. They were used in the Southern region widely and made of copper.

== Classical period of Nepal (c. CE 576–750) ==
=== Lichhavi Dynasty ===
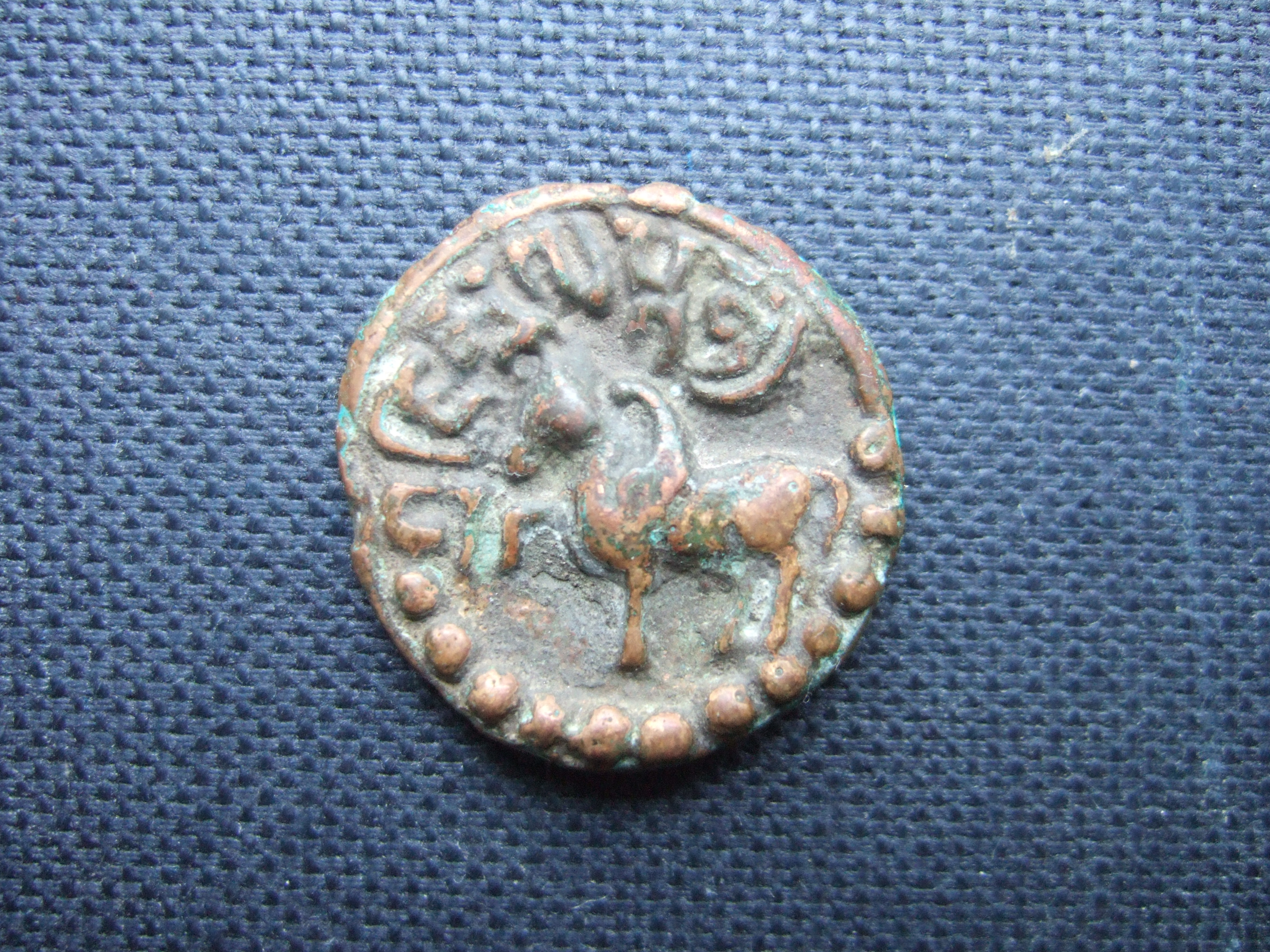
Copper coin of Jishnu Gupta (c. 622–633) of the Nepalese Licchhavi Dynasty. Obverse. The inscription above the winged horse is Sri Jishnu Guptasya

The Licchavi Kingdom of Nepal established its root in the Kathmandu Valley from c. CE 576 to 750. This marked the beginning of the Classical period of Nepal. Lichhavi Coins were the first coins widely used in the Kathmandu Valley and its surrounding hills.

== Malla Dynasty (c. CE 1540–1768) ==
=== Tankas Standard ===
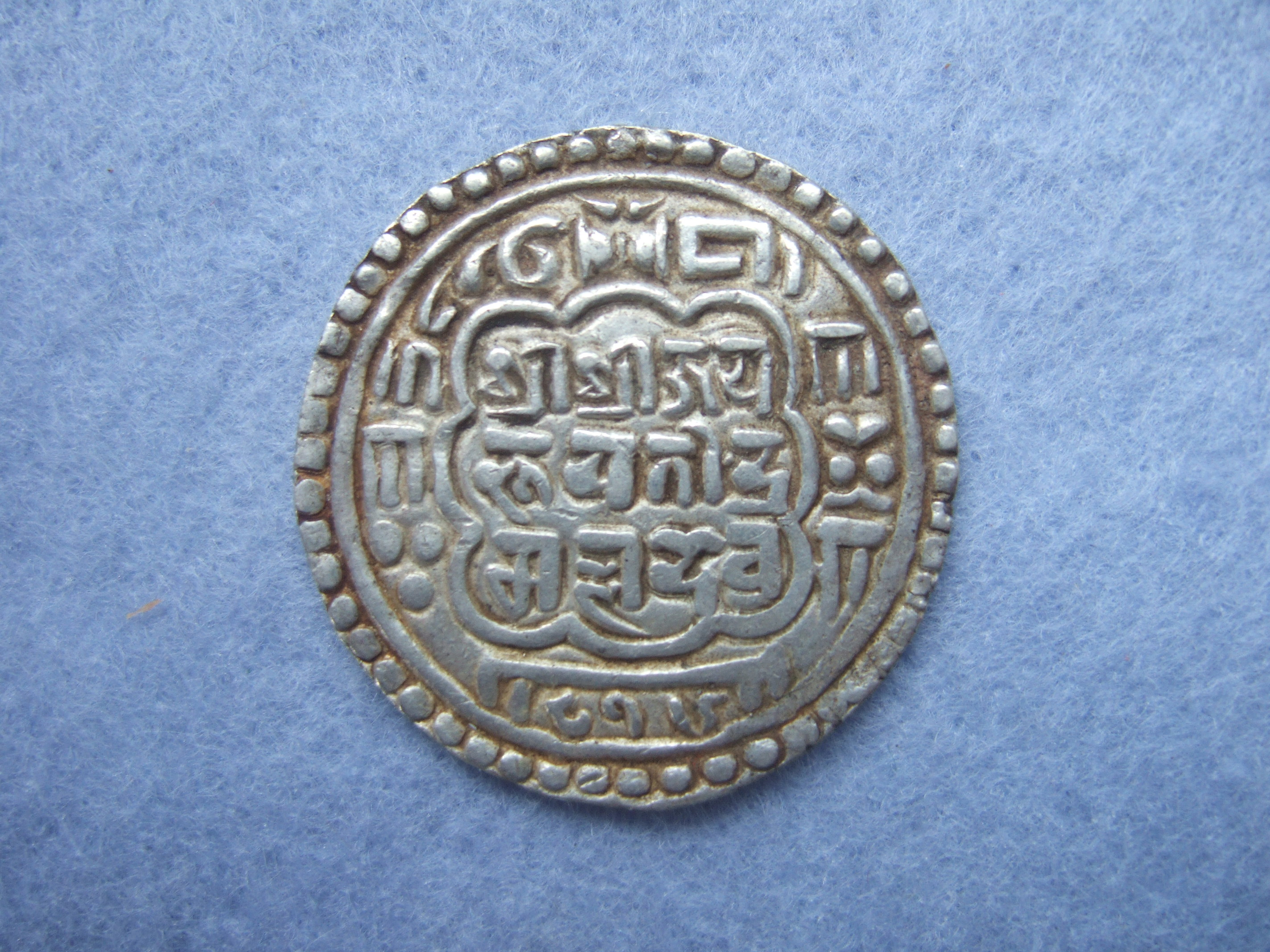
Nepalese silver mohar in the name of King Bhupatindra Malla (ruled 1696–1722) of Bhadgaon (Bhaktapur), dated Nepal Era 816 ( = AD 1696), obverse. Silver mohars of this type were also exported to Tibet where they circulated along with other Malla mohars

=== Mohar Standard ===
After a major reform in coinage, a new style of silver coins called Mohar (Initially called Mhendramalli) were struck in Nepal with a reduced weight standard of 5.4 g. in silver.

== Shah Dynasty (CE.1747–2008) ==
=== After the conquest of the Valley ===
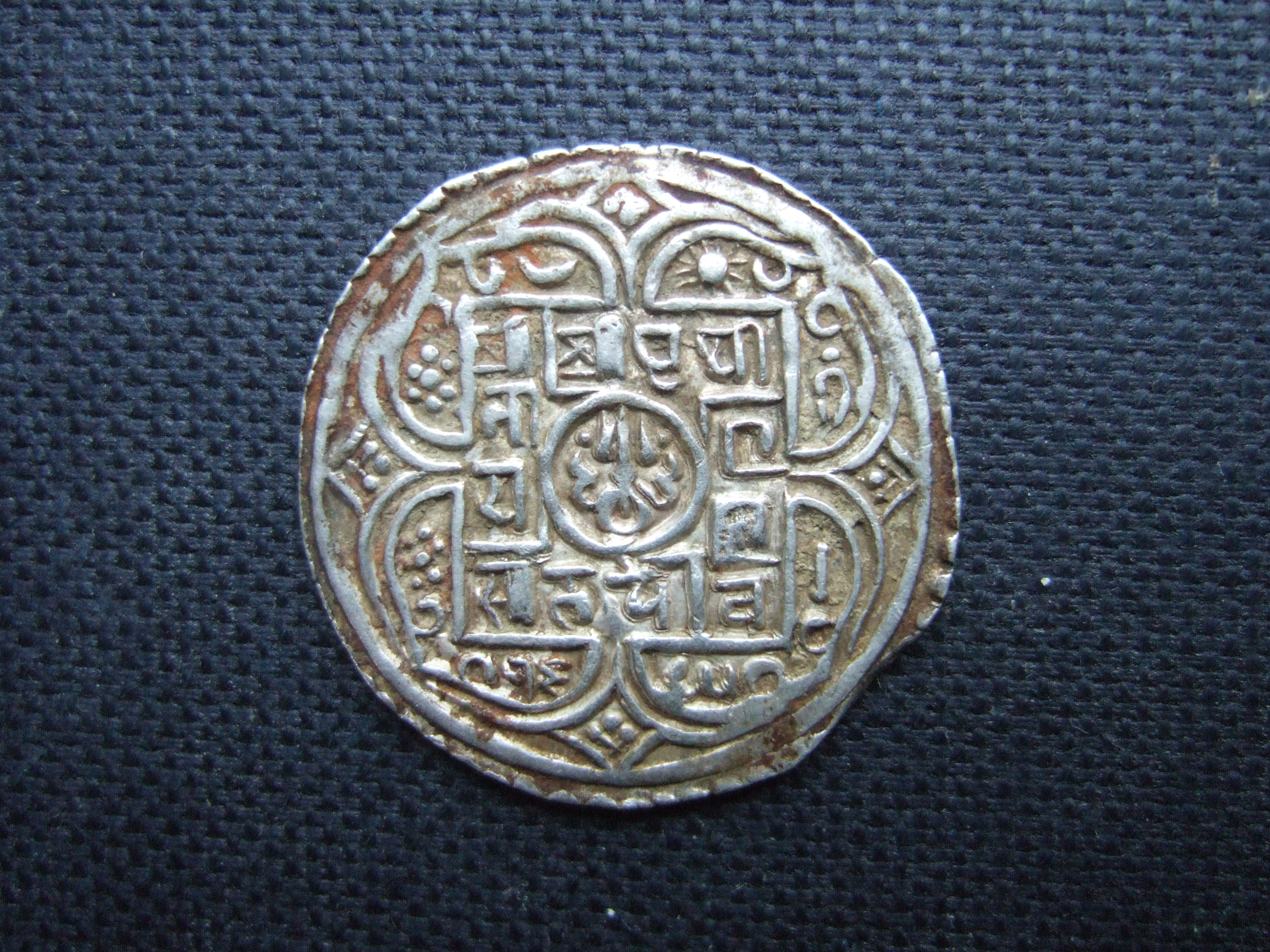
Coin of King Prithivi Narayan Shah

=== Copper coinage in Valley ===
In CE. 1865, the first copper coins were issued for the Kathmandu Valley in the denomination of Copper Paisa, Double Paisa and Dam with inscription in Devanagari script.

== System ==
=== Tanka standard ===
- 1 Tanka
- 1/4 Tanka
- 1/32 Tanka = 4 Dam
- 1 Dam = 4 Jawa

=== Silver Mohar system (after 1640) ===
- Double Rupee = 4 Mohar
- 1 Rupee /Double Mohar = 2 Mohar
- 1 Mohar = 2 Suka
- 1 Suka = 6.25 Aana
- 1 Aana = 2 Adha-aana
- 1 Adha-aana = 2 paisa
- 1 Paisa Mohar = 4 Dams
- 1 Dam = 4 Jawa

=== Copper standard ===
- 1 Ganda or Ani/Aana = 2 Dyak or 2 Double Paisa
- 1 Dyak or 1 Double Paisa = 2 Dhebua or 2 Paisa
- 1 Dhebua/Paisa = 4 Dam (Copper)

=== Gold coin system ===
- Duitole Asarfi = 4 Mohar = 2 Tolas = 360 troy grains
- Bakla Asarfi = 2 Mohar = 1 Tola = 180 troy grains
- Patla/Majhawala Asarfi = 1 Mohar = 1/2 Tola = 90 troy grains
- Suka Asarfi = 1/2 Mohar= 1/4 Tola = 45 troy grains
- Suki = 1/8 Mohar= 1/16 Tola = 22.5 troy grains
- Ani = 1/16 Mohar = 1/32 Tola = 2.93 troy grains
- Adha-Ani = 1/32 Mohar = 1/64 Tola = 5.87 troy grains
- Pal = 1/64 Mohar = 1/128 Tola = 2.93 troy grains
- Dam = 1/154 Mohar = 1/317 Tola = 0.71 troy grains

== Gallery ==
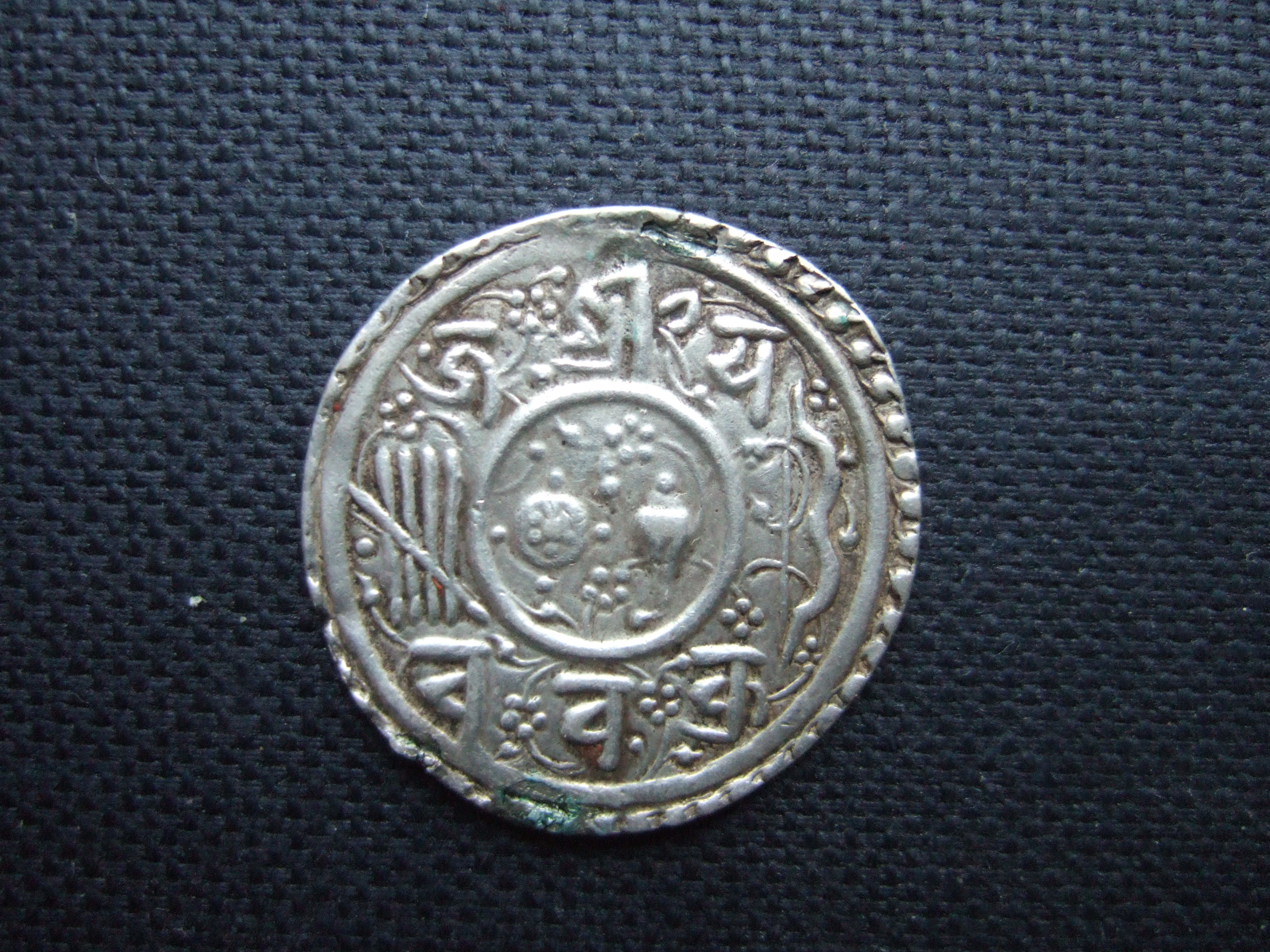
Nepalese silver mohar in the name of king Chakravartendra Malla of Kathmandu, dated Nepal Sambat 789 = AD 1669, obverse

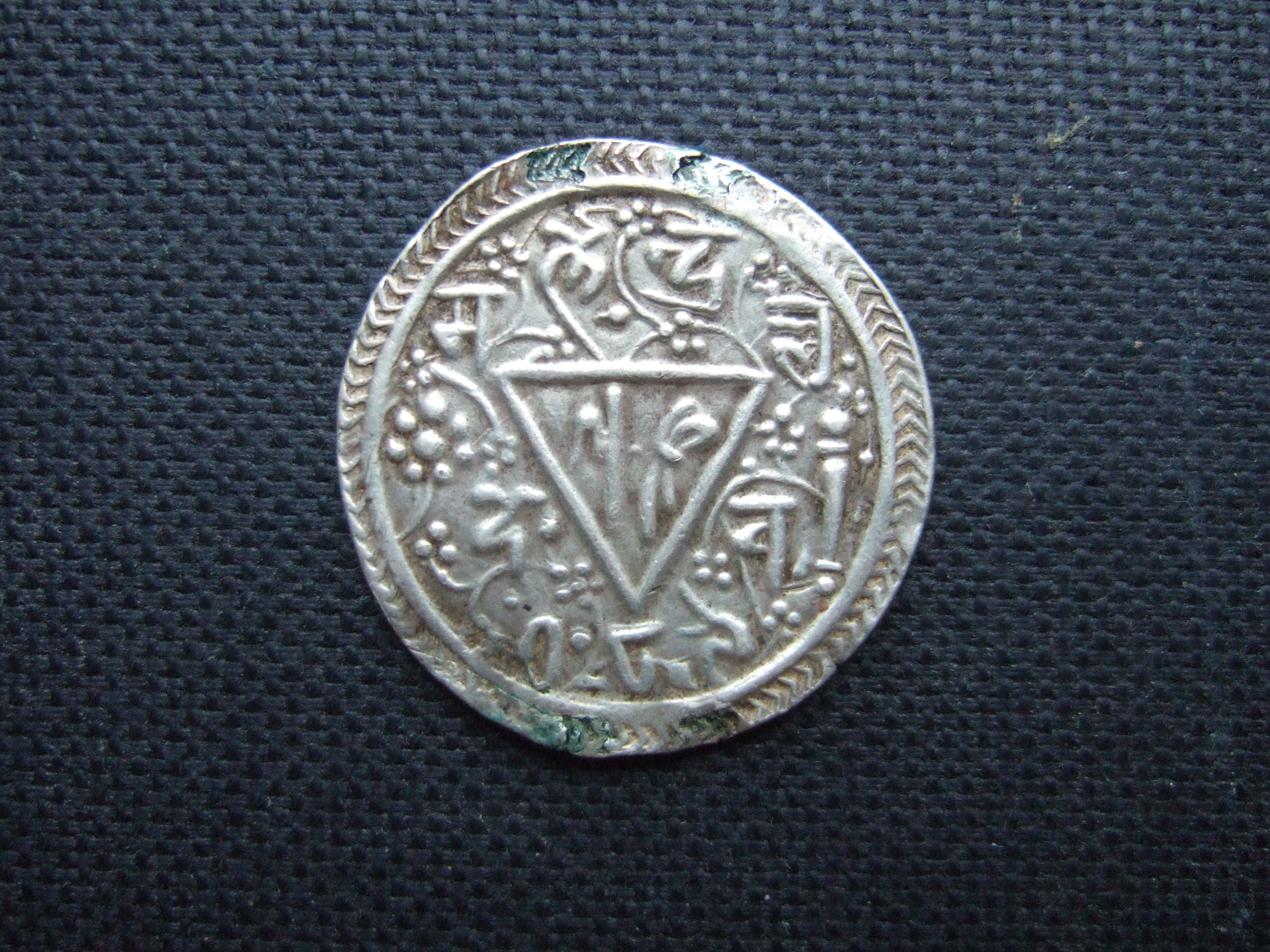
Nepalese silver mohar in the name of king Chakravartendra Malla of Kathmandu, dated Nepal Sambat 789 = AD 1669, reverse

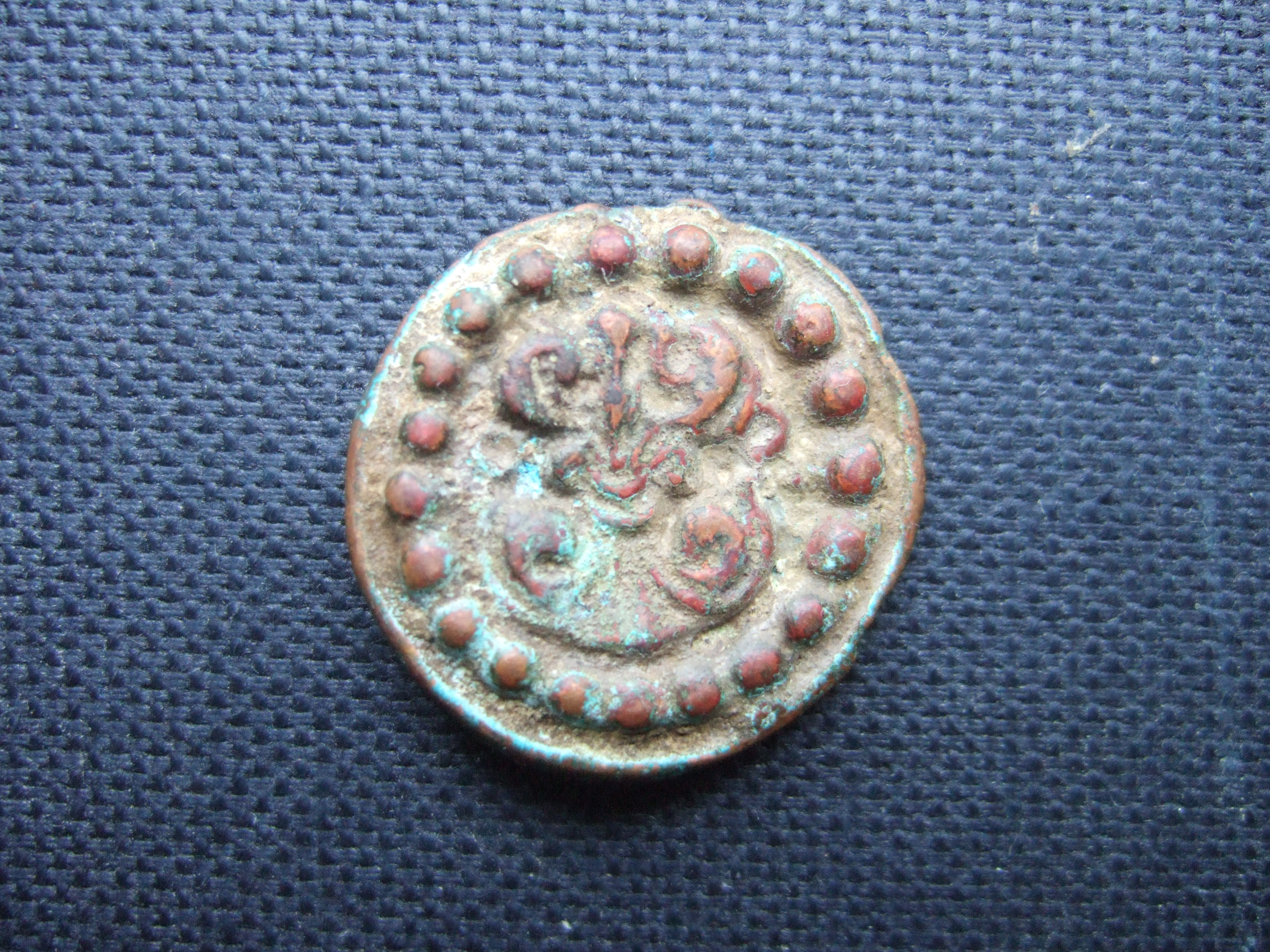
Copper coin of Jishnu Gupta (c. 622–633) of the Nepalese Licchhavi Dynasty. Reverse

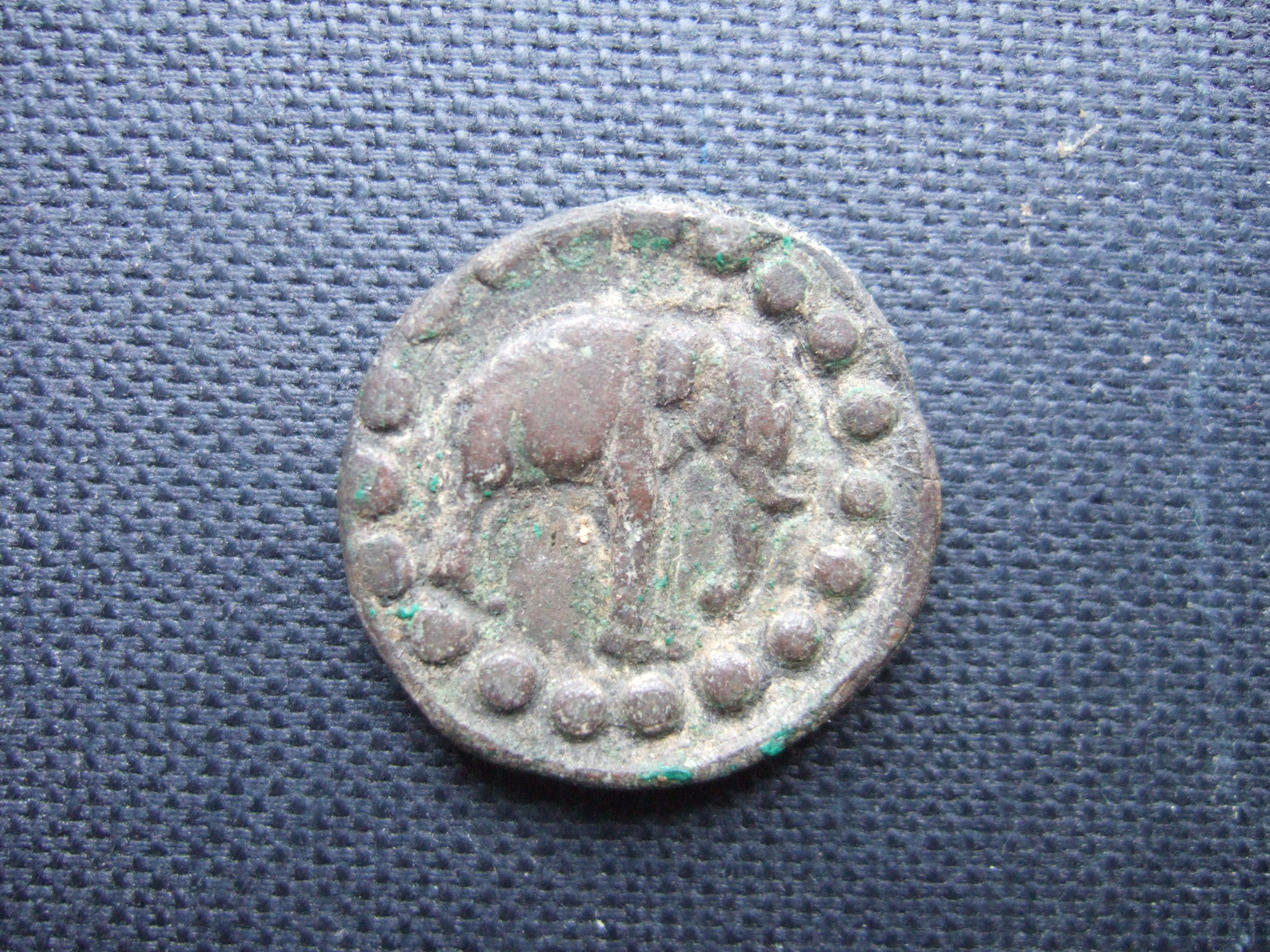
Gunanka.

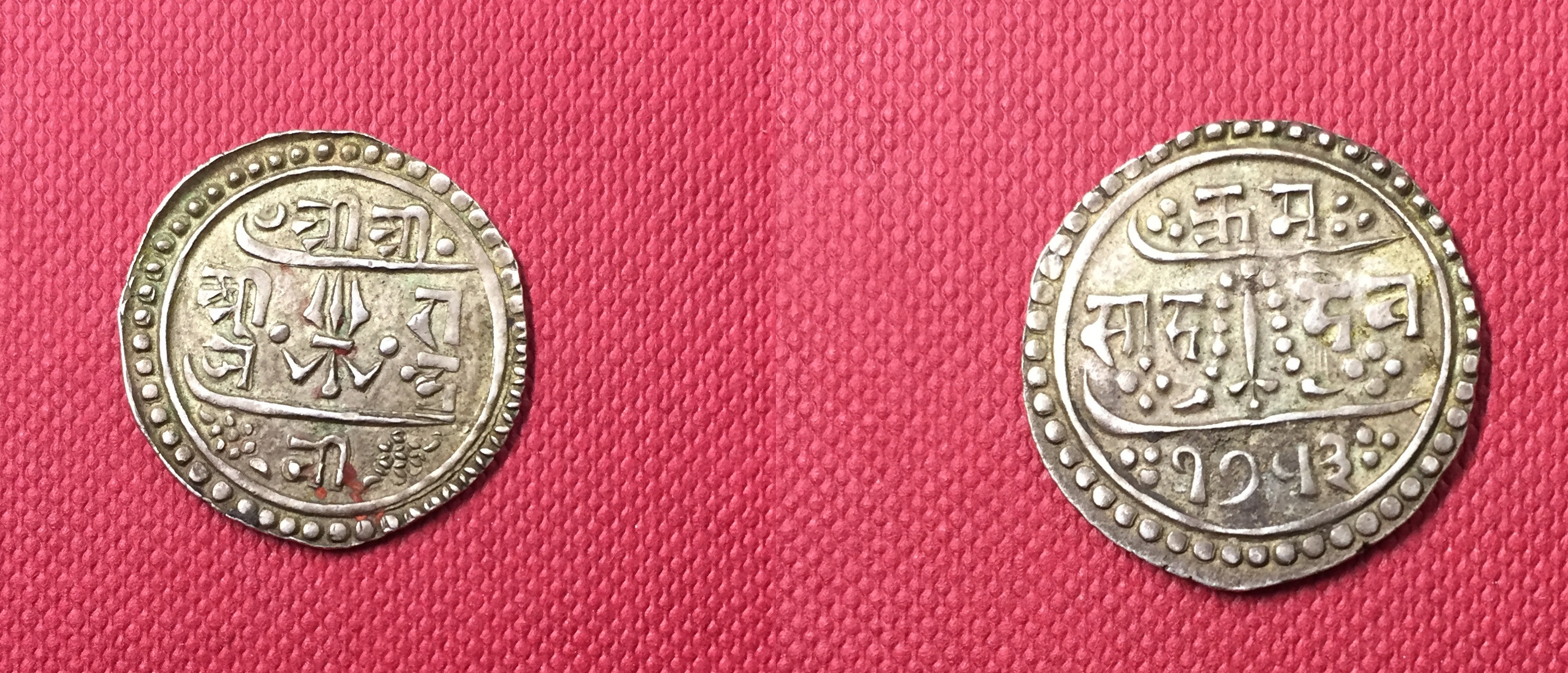
Half Mohar Rajendra Vikrama

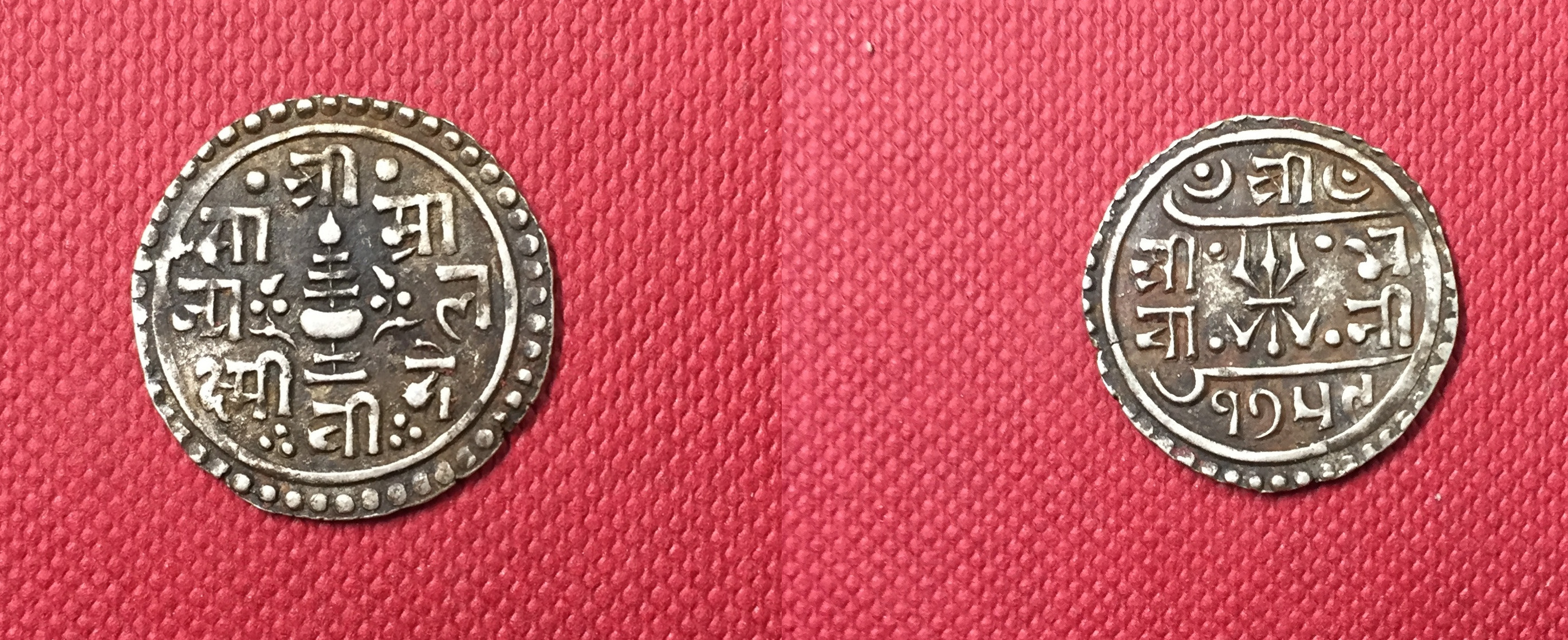
Suka Mohar Rajendra Vikrama in the name of Queen Samrajya lakshmi.

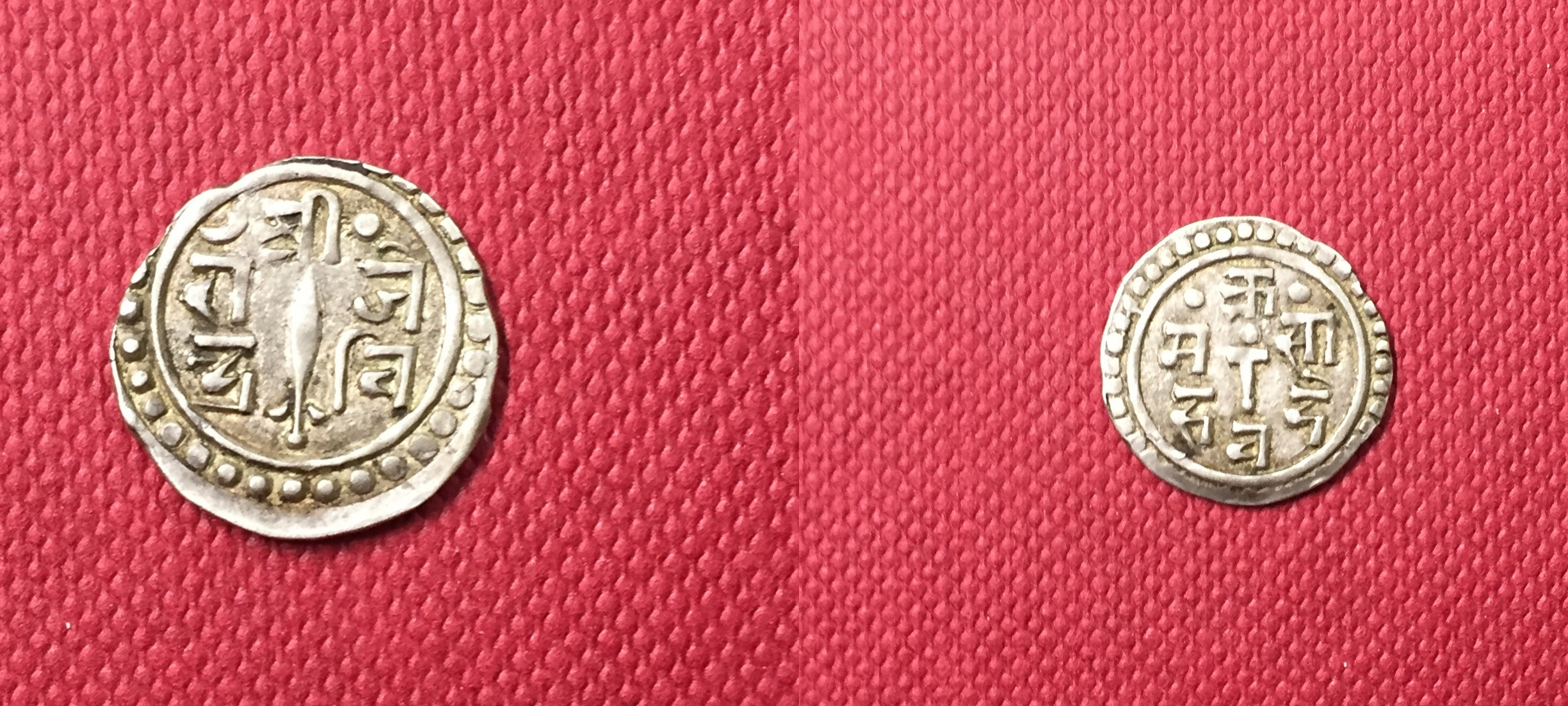
1-8 Mohar Rajendra Vikrama

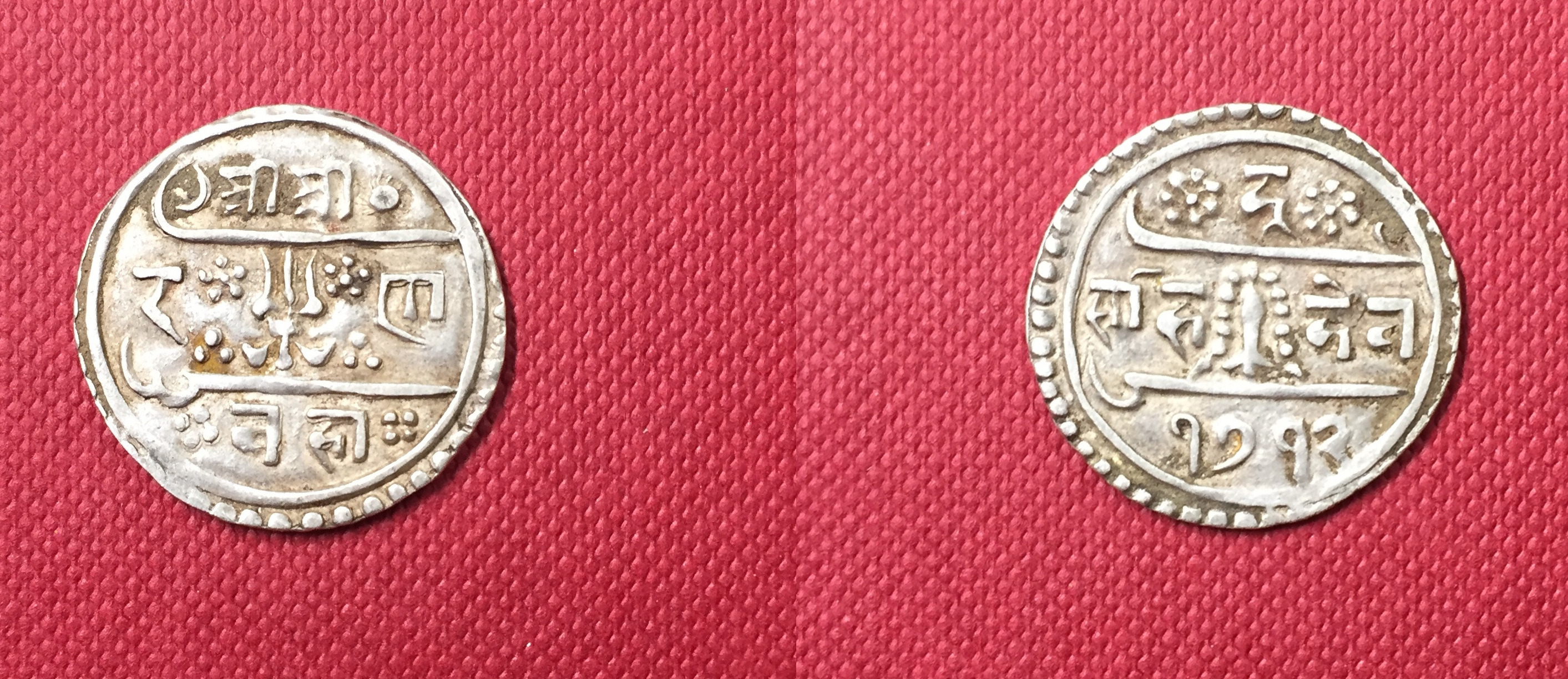
Half Mohar Rana Bahadur Shah

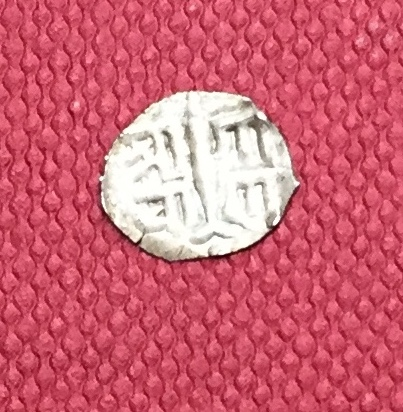
Uni-face Silver Dam Girvana Yuddha.

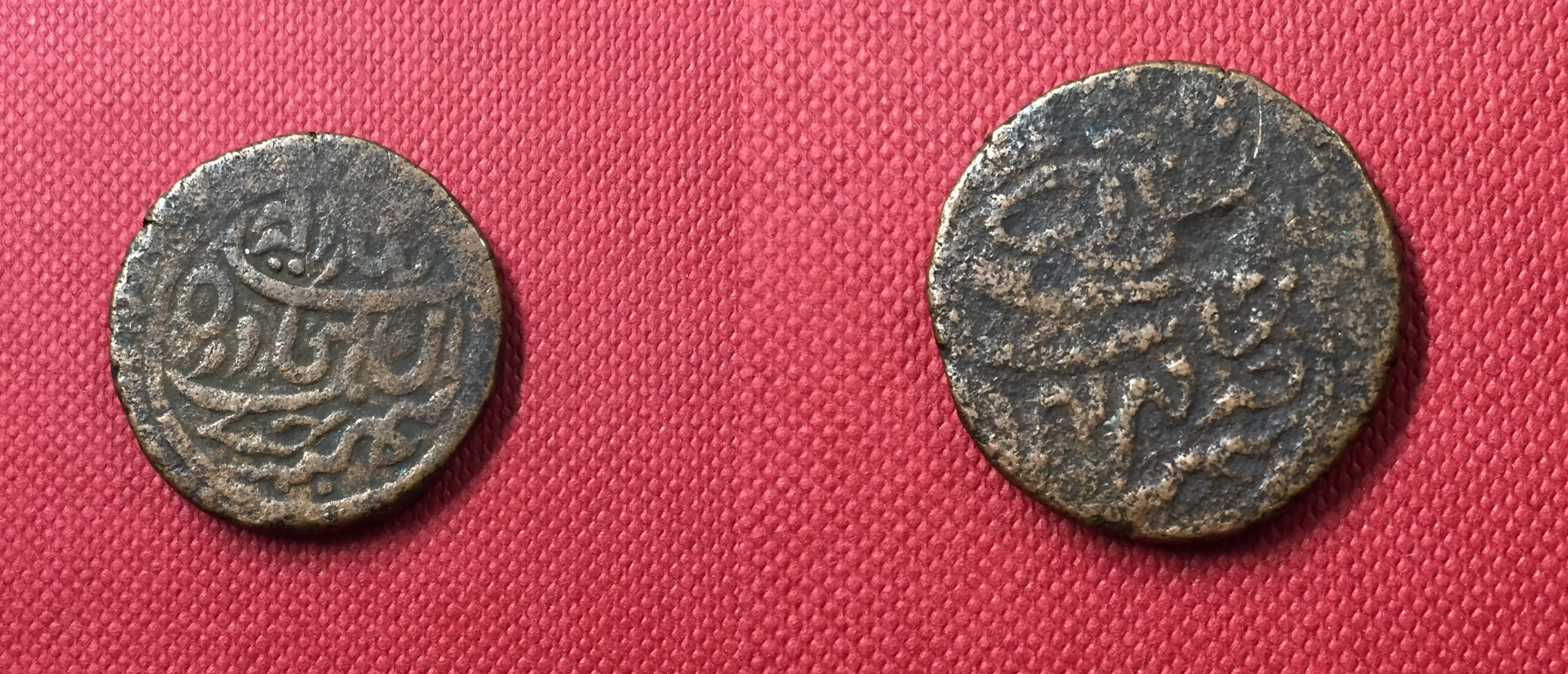
Rana Bahadur 1 paisa.

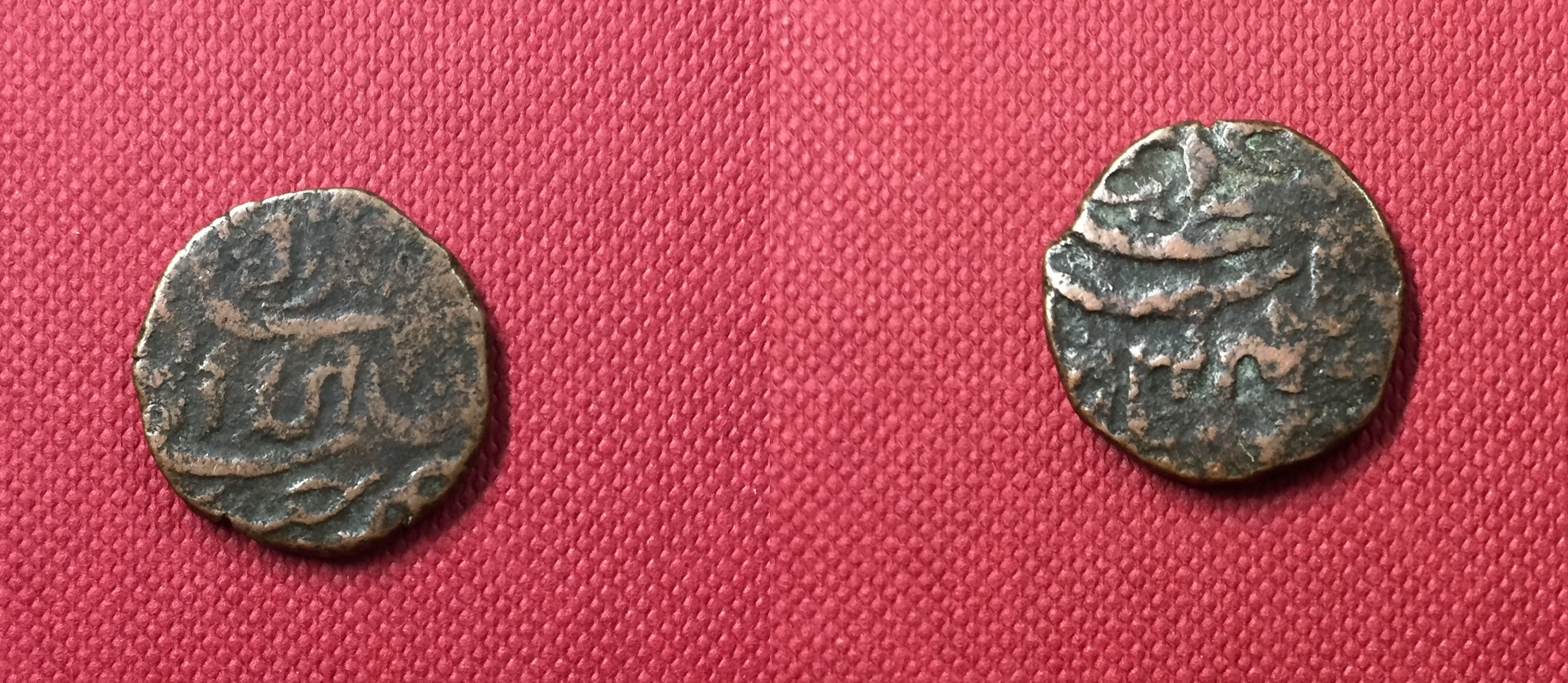
Rana Bahadur Half paisa.

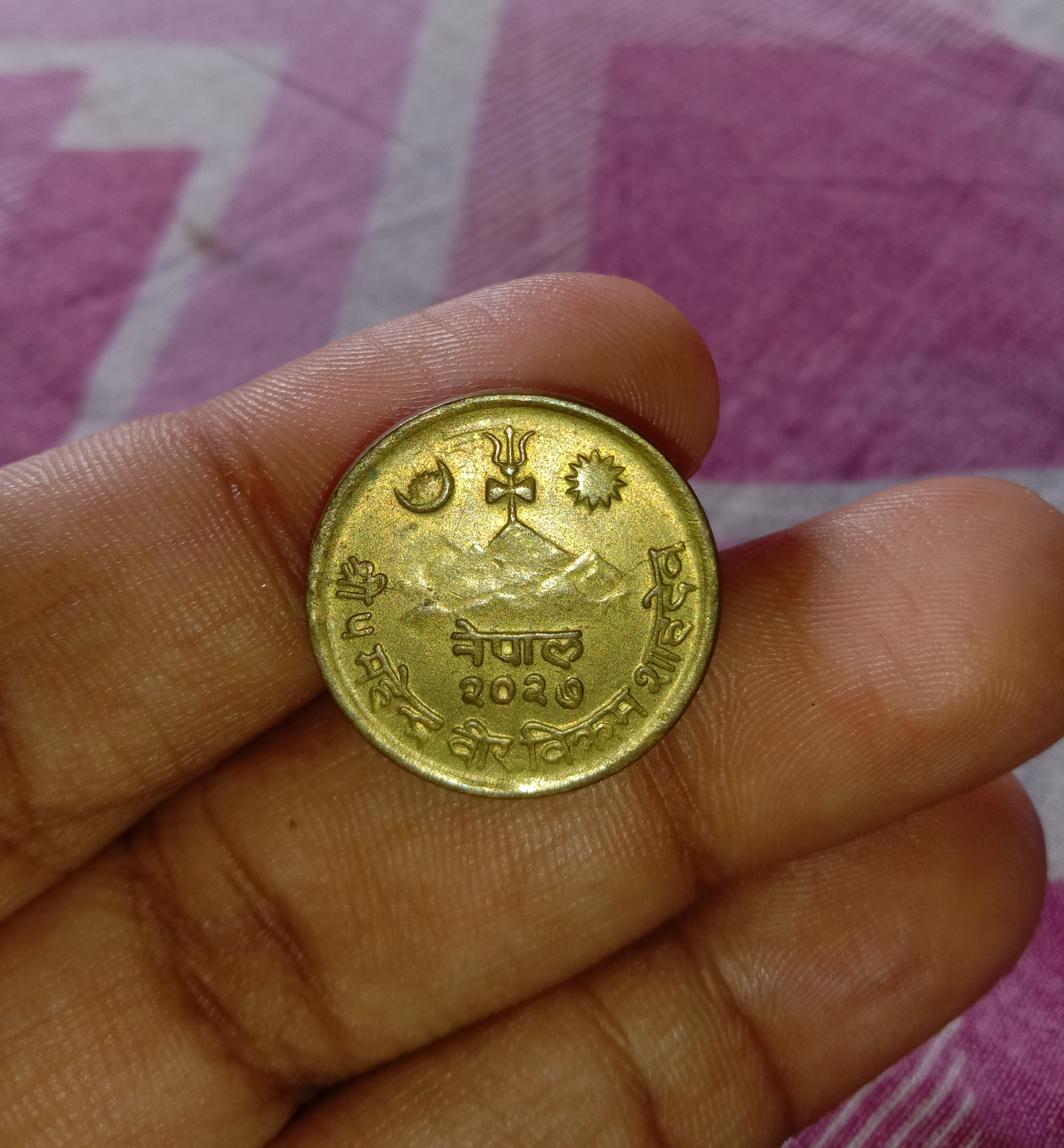
Obverse of a 10 Paisa coin of Nepal from the reign of Mahendra Bir Bikram, made of brass.

== See also ==
- Historical money of Tibet
