= Rupee =

Common name for several currencies

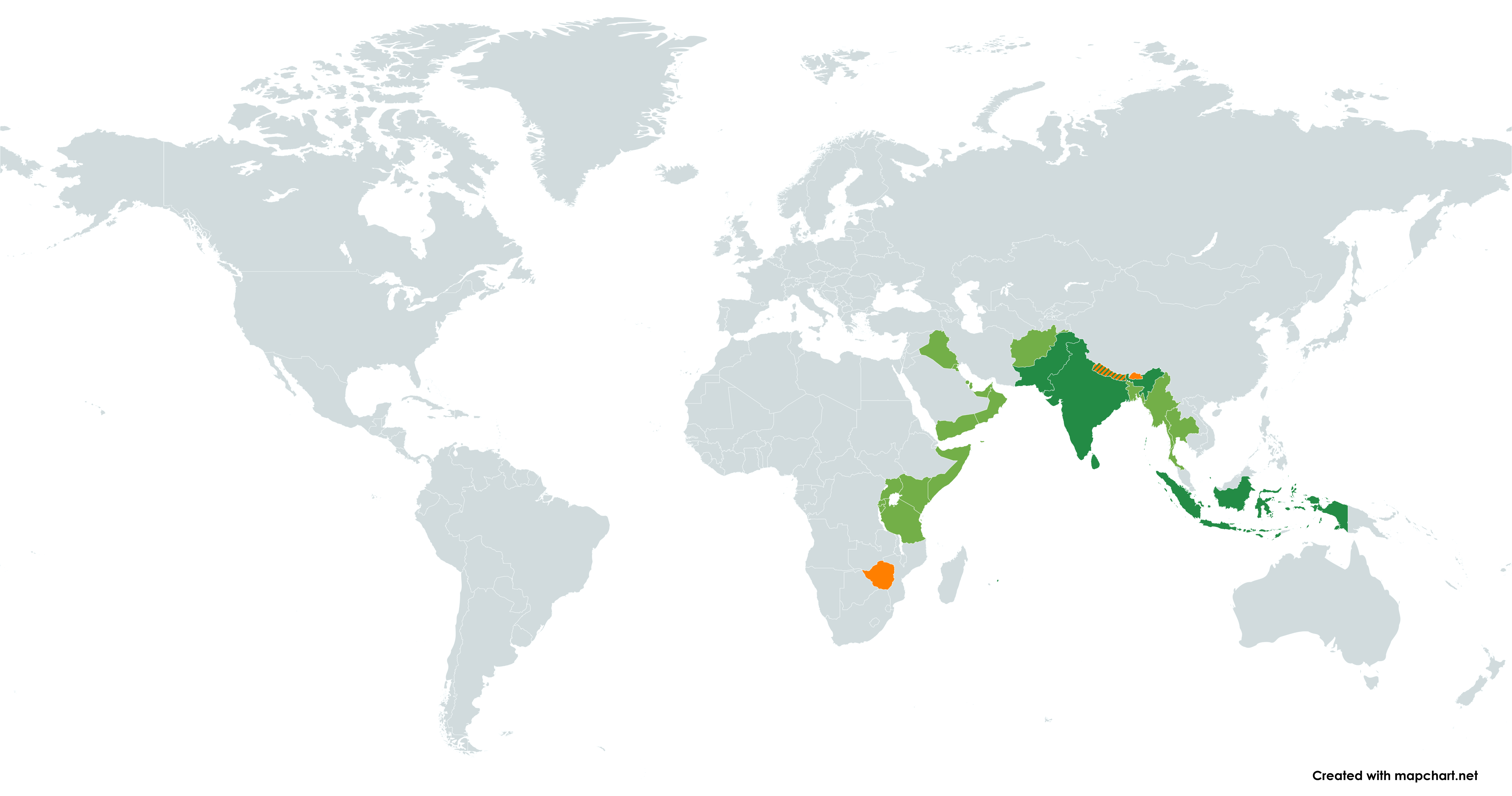
Countries where Rupee is currently an official currency Countries where Rupee was an official currency in the past Countries where Rupee is a legal tender

Rupee (UK: /ˌruːˈpiː/, US: /ˈruːpiː/) is the common name for the currencies of India, Mauritius, Nepal, Pakistan, Seychelles, and Sri Lanka, and of former currencies of Afghanistan, Bahrain, Bangladesh, Kuwait, Oman, the United Arab Emirates (as the Gulf rupee), British East Africa, Burma, German East Africa (as Rupie/Rupien), and Tibet. In Indonesia, Italian Somaliland, and the Maldives, the unit of currency is known as rupiah, rupia, and rufiyaa respectively, which are cognates of the word rupee.

The Indian rupee and Pakistani rupee are subdivided into one hundred paise (singular paisa) or pice. The Nepalese rupee (रू) subdivides into one hundred paisa (singular and plural) or four sukaas. The Mauritian, Seychellois, and Sri Lankan rupees subdivide into 100 cents.

== Etymology ==
The Hindustani word rupayā (रुपया) is derived from the Sanskrit word rūpya (रूप्य), which means "wrought silver, a coin of silver", in origin an adjective meaning "shapely", with a more specific meaning of "stamped, impressed", whence "coin". It is derived from the noun rūpa (रूप) "shape, likeness, image".

== History ==
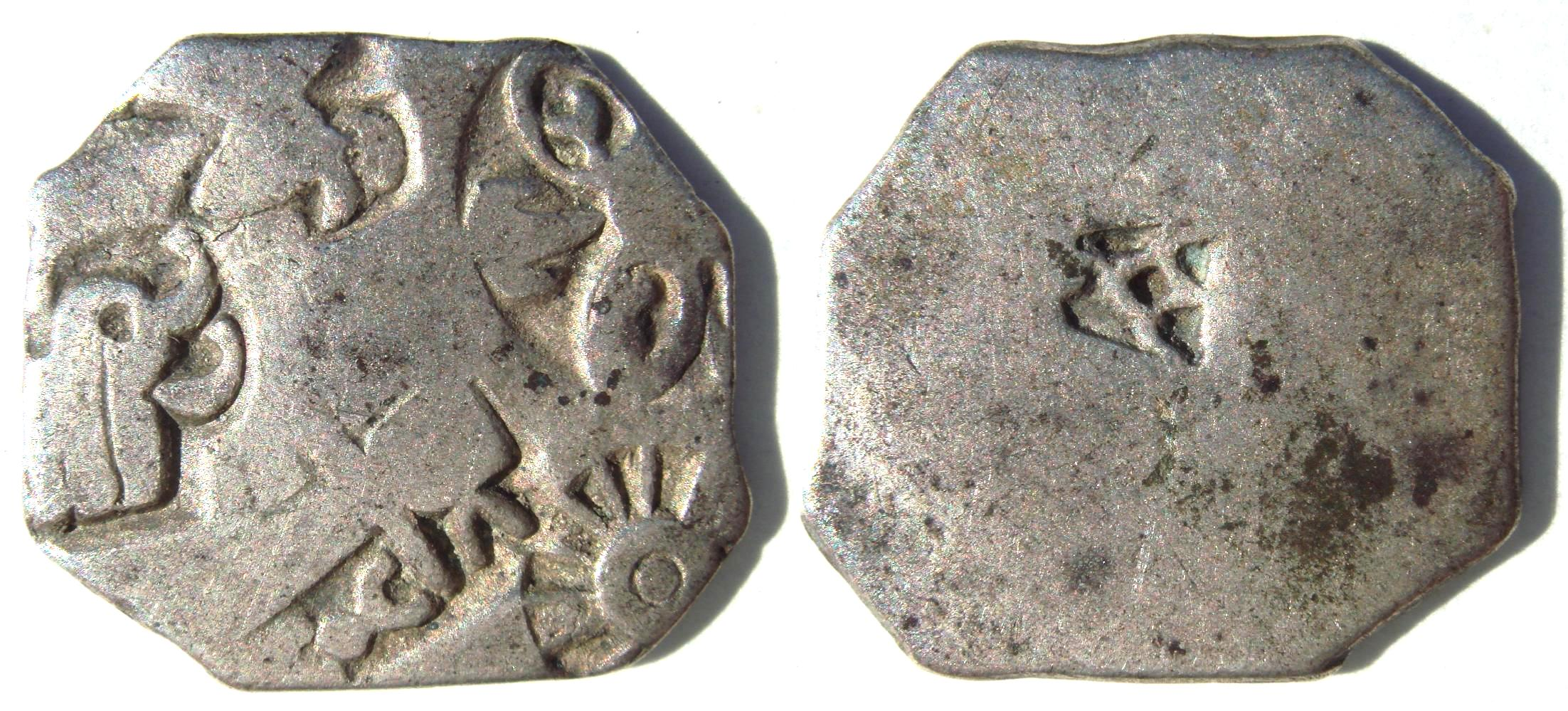
Rūpyarūpa issued by the Maurya Empire, with symbols of wheel and elephant. 3rd century BC.

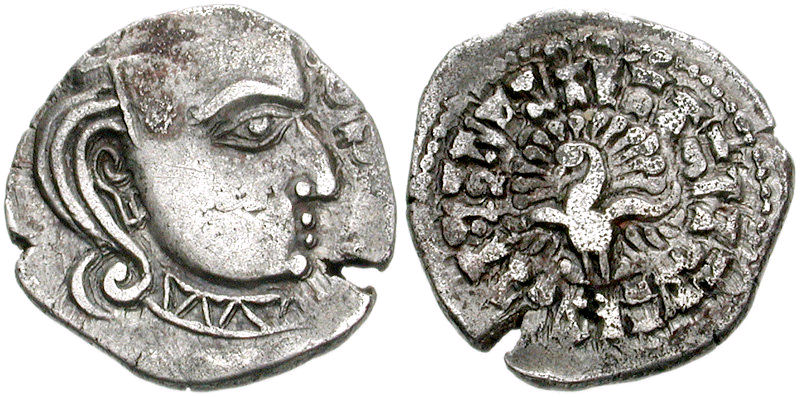
Silver coin of Skandagupta of the Gupta Empire, known as Rūpaka (रूपक) in Sanskrit, in the style of the Western Satraps with a peacock on the reverse, 455–467 CE.

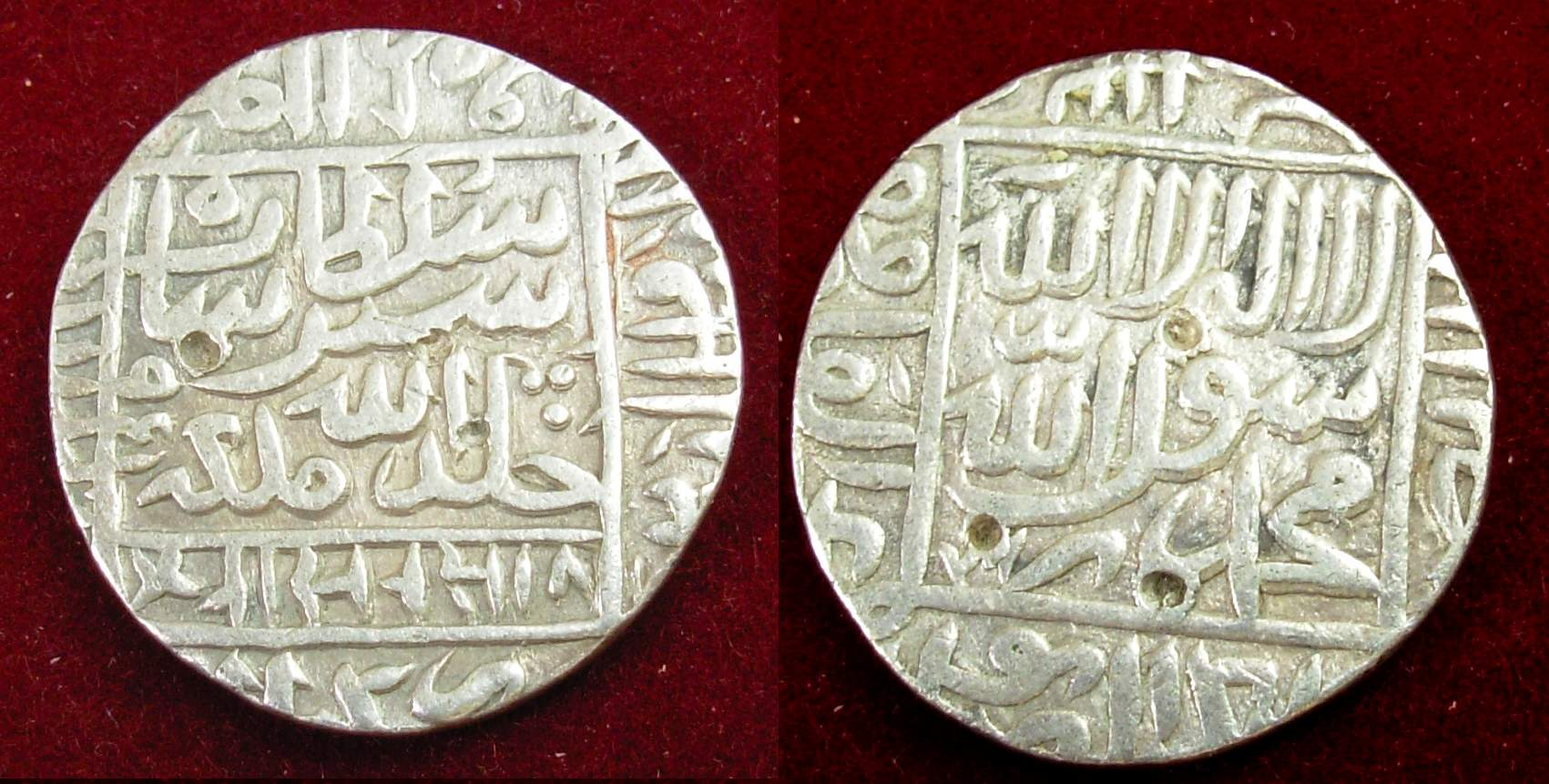
Rupiya issued by the Sher Shah Suri, 1540–1545 CE.

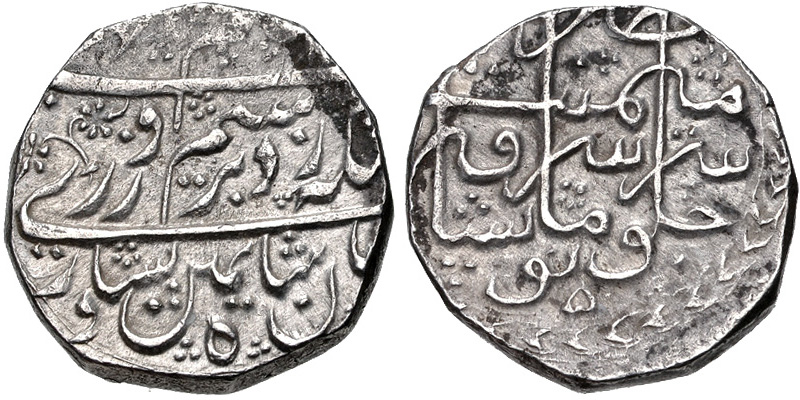
Silver Rupee under Zaman Shah Durrani in the 1790s, minted in Peshawar

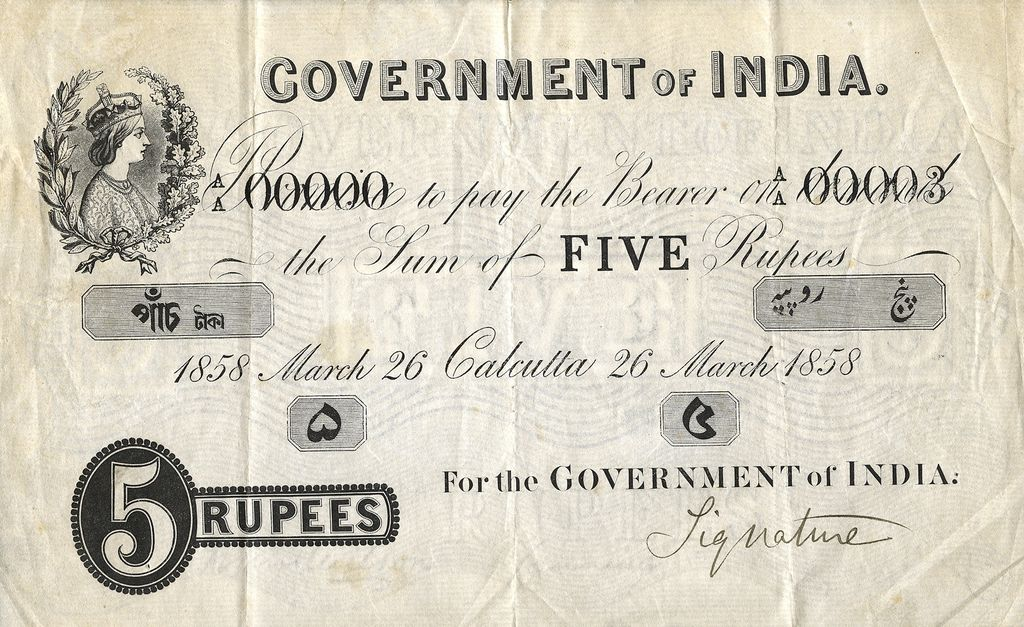
Government of India — 5 Rupee note, 1858

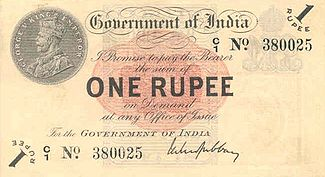
Government of India — 1 Rupee banknote, 1917

The history of the rupee traces back to ancient India circa 3rd century BC. Ancient India was one of the earliest issuers of coins in the world, along with the Lydian staters, several other Middle Eastern coinages and the Chinese wen. The term is from rūpya, a Sanskrit term for silver coin, from Sanskrit rūpa, beautiful form.

Arthashastra, written by Chanakya, chief adviser to the first Maurya emperor Chandragupta Maurya (c. 340–290 BCE), mentions silver coins as rūpyarūpa, other types including gold coins (rūpya-suvarṇa), copper coins (tāmrarūpa) and lead coins (sīsarūpa) are mentioned. Rūpa means form or shape, example, rūpyarūpa, rūpya – wrought silver, rūpa – form. This coinage system continued more or less across the Indian subcontinent well till 20th century.

In the intermediate times there was no fixed monetary system as reported by the Da Tang Xi Yu Ji.

During his reign from 1538/1540 to 1545, Sher Shah Suri of the Sur Empire set up a new civic and military administration and issued a coin of silver, weighing 178 grains, which was also termed the Rupiya. Suri also introduced copper coins called dam and gold coins called mohur that weighed 169 grains (10.95 g). The use of the rupee coin continued under the Mughal Empire with the same standard and weight, though some rulers after Mughal Emperor Akbar occasionally issued heavier rupees.

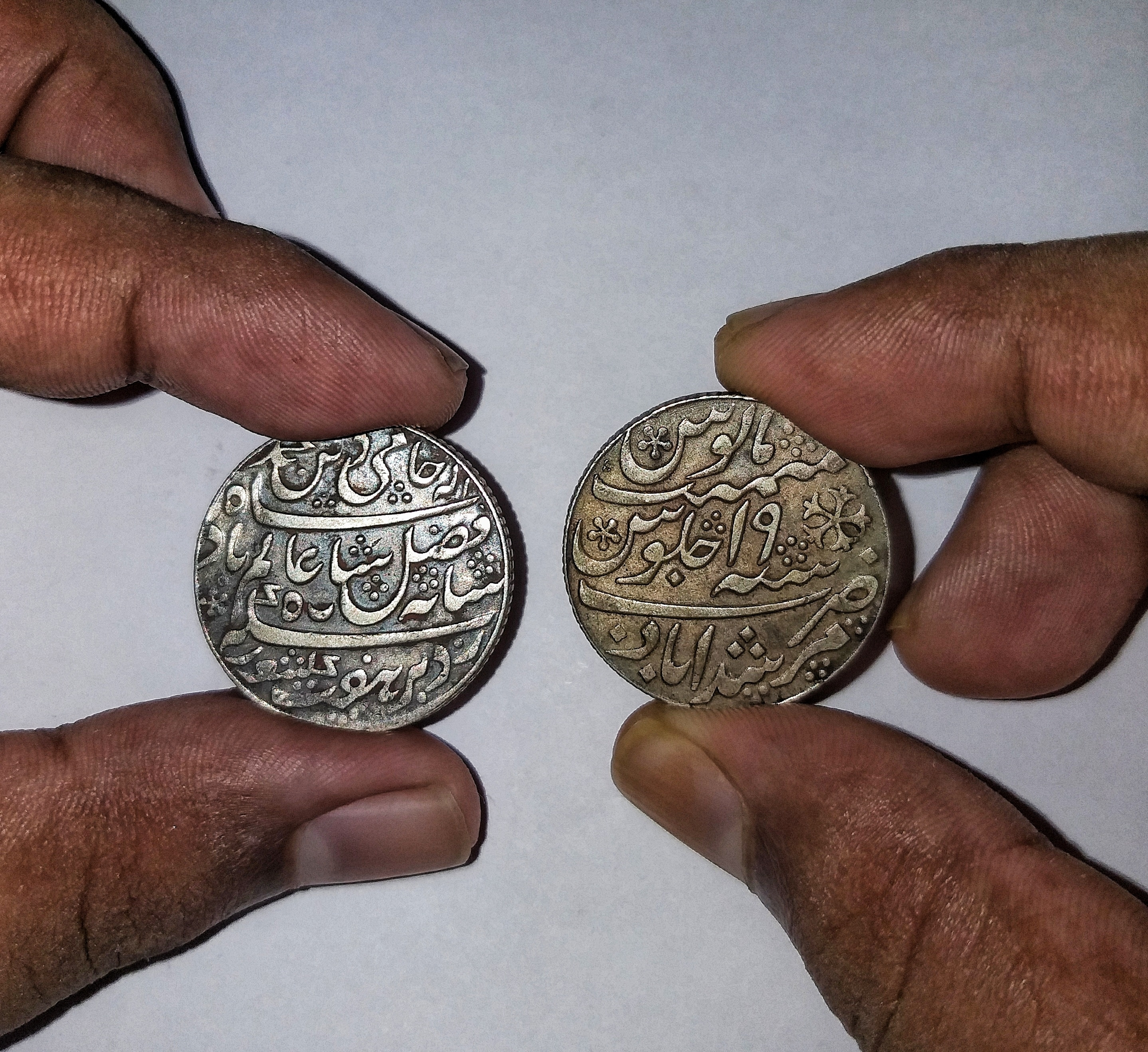
Silver rupee coins from the Bengal Presidency, struck in the name of Shah Alam II, minted in Calcutta.

The European powers started minting coinage as early as mid-17th century, under patronage of Mughal Empire. The British gold coins were termed Carolina, the silver coins Anglina, the copper coins Cupperoon and tin coins Tinny. The coins of Bengal were developed in the Mughal style and those of Madras mostly in a South Indian style. The English coins of Western India developed along Mughal as well as English patterns. It was only in AD 1717 that the British obtained permission from the Emperor Farrukh Siyar to coin Mughal money at the Bombay mint. By early 1830, the British had become the dominant power in India and started minting coinage independently. The Coinage Act of 1835 provided for uniform coinage throughout India. The new coins had the effigy of William IV on the obverse and the value on the reverse in English and Persian. The coins issued after 1840 bore the portrait of Queen Victoria. The first coinage under the crown was issued in 1862 and in 1877 Queen Victoria assumed the title the Empress of India. The gold silver ratio expanded during 1870–1910. Unlike India, Britain was on the gold standard.

The 1911 accession to the throne of the King-Emperor George V led to the famous "pig rupee". On the coin, the King appeared wearing a robe with the imprint of an elephant. Through poor engraving, the elephant looked like a pig. The Muslim population was enraged and the image had to be quickly redesigned. Acute shortage of silver during the First World War, led to the introduction of paper currency of One Rupee and Two and a half Rupees. The silver coins of smaller denominations were issued in cupro-nickel. The compulsion of the Second World War led to experiments in coinage where the standard rupee was replaced by the "Quaternary Silver Alloy". The Quaternary Silver coins were issued from 1940. In 1947 these were replaced by pure Nickel coins. The Monetary System remained unchanged at One Rupee consisting of 64 pice, or 192 pies.

In India, the "Anna Series" was introduced on 15 August 1950. This was the first coinage of the Republic of India. The King's Portrait was replaced by the Ashoka's Lion Capital. A corn sheaf replaced the Tiger on the one Rupee coin. The monetary system was retained with one Rupee consisting of 16 Annas. The 1955 Indian Coinage (Amendment) Act, that came into force with effect from 1 April 1957, introduced a "Decimal series". The rupee was now divided into 100 'Paisa' instead of 16 Annas or 64 Pice. The "Naye Paise" coins were minted in the denominations of 1, 2, 5, 10, 20 and 50 Naye Paise. Both the Anna series and the Naye Paise coins were valid for some time. From 1968 onwards, the new coins were called just Paise instead of Naye Paise because they were no longer naye (new).

With high inflation in the sixties, small denomination coins which were made of bronze, nickel-brass, cupro-nickel, and aluminium-bronze were gradually minted in aluminium only. This change commenced with the introduction of the new hexagonal 3 paise coin. A twenty paise coin was introduced in 1968 but did not gain much popularity. Over a period, cost-benefit considerations led to the gradual discontinuance of 1, 2 and 3 paise coins in the 1970s. Stainless steel coinage of 10, 25 and 50 paise, was introduced in 1988 and of one rupee in 1992. The very considerable costs of managing note issues of Rs 1, Rs 2, and Rs 5 led to the gradual coinisation of these denominations in the 1990s.

=== East Africa, Arabia, and Mesopotamia ===
In East Africa, Arabia, and Mesopotamia, the rupee and its subsidiary coinage was current at various times. The usage of the rupee in East Africa extended from Somaliland in the north to as far south as Natal. In Mozambique, the British India rupees were overstamped, and in Kenya, the British East Africa Company minted the rupee and its fractions, as well as pice.

The rise in the price of silver immediately after the First World War caused the rupee to rise in value to two shillings sterling. In 1920 in British East Africa, the opportunity was then taken to introduce a new florin coin, hence bringing the currency into line with sterling. Shortly after that, the florin was split into two East African shillings. This assimilation to sterling did not, however, happen in British India itself. In Somalia, the Italian colonial authority minted 'rupia' to exactly the same standard and called the pice 'besa'.

The Indian rupee was the official currency of Dubai and Qatar until 1959, when India created a new Gulf rupee (also known as the "external rupee") to hinder the smuggling of gold. The Gulf rupee was legal tender until 1966, when India significantly devalued the Indian rupee and a new Qatar-Dubai riyal was established to provide economic stability.

=== Straits Settlements ===
The Straits Settlements were originally an outlier of the British East India Company. The Spanish dollar had already taken hold in the Straits Settlements by the time the British arrived in the 19th century. The East India Company tried to introduce the rupee in its place. These attempts were resisted by the locals, and by 1867 when the British government took over direct control of the Straits Settlements from the East India Company, attempts to introduce the rupee were finally abandoned.

=== Tibet ===
Until the middle of the 20th century, Tibet's official currency was also known as the Tibetan rupee.

=== Denominations ===
The original silver rupee, .917 fine silver, 11.66 grams (179.9 grains; 0.375 troy ounces), was divided into 16 annas, 64 paise, or 192 pies. Each circulating coin of British India, until the rupee was decimalised, had a different name in practice. A paisa was equal to two dhelas, three pies, or six damaris. Other coins for half anna (adhanni, or two paisas), two annas (duanni), four annas (a chawanni, or a quarter of a rupee), and eight annas (an athanni, or half a rupee) were widely in use until decimalization in 1961. (The numbers adha, do, chār, ātha mean respectively half, two, four, eight in Hindi and Urdu.) Two paisa was also called a taka, see below.

Decimalisation occurred in India in 1957 and in Pakistan in 1961. Since 1957 an Indian rupee is divided into 100 paise. The decimalised paisa was originally officially named naya paisa meaning the "new paisa" to distinguish it from the erstwhile paisa which had a higher value of 1/64 rupee. The word naya was dropped in 1964 and since then it is simply known as paisa (plural paise).

The most commonly used symbol for the rupee is "₨". India adopted a new symbol (₹) for the Indian rupee on 15 July 2010. In most parts of India, the rupee is known as rupaya, rupaye, or one of several other terms derived from the Sanskrit rūpya, meaning silver.

Ṭaṅka is an ancient Sanskrit word for money. While the two-paise coin was called a taka in West Pakistan, the word taka was commonly used in East Pakistan (now Bangladesh), alternatively for rupee. In the Bengali and Assamese languages, spoken in Assam, Tripura, and West Bengal, the rupee is known as toka or taka, and is written as such on Indian banknotes. In Odisha it is known as tanka. After its independence, Bangladesh started to officially call its currency "taka" (BDT) in 1971.

The issuance of the Indian currency is controlled by the Reserve Bank of India, and issuance of Pakistani currency is controlled by State Bank of Pakistan.

Currently in India (from 2010 onwards), the 50 paise coin (half a rupee) is the lowest valued legal tender coin. Coins of 1, 2, 5, and 10 rupees and banknotes of 5, 10, 20, 50, 100, 200, 500, and 2000 rupees are commonly in use for cash transaction.

Large denominations of rupees are traditionally counted in lakhs, crores, arabs, kharabs, nils, padmas, shankhs, udpadhas, and anks. Terms beyond crore are not generally used in the context of money; for example, an amount would be called ₨ 1 lakh crore (equivalent to 1 trillion) instead of ₨ 10 kharab.

== Symbol ==
The symbol ₹ is the Indian rupee sign. The precomposed character ₨ is a currency sign used to represent the monetary unit of account in Pakistan, Sri Lanka, Nepal, Mauritius, Seychelles, and formerly in India. It resembles, and is often written as, the Latin character sequence "Rs" or "Rs.". The symbol रू represents the Nepalese rupee. Currency signs exist for other countries that use the rupee but not this sign: their usage is also described at the main article.

=== In Unicode ===
The codepoints for these symbols are:

- U+20A8 ₨ RUPEE SIGN
- U+20B9 ₹ INDIAN RUPEE SIGN

U+3353 ㍓ SQUARE RUPII is a square version of ルピー rupī, the Japanese word for "rupee". It is intended for CJK Compatibility with earlier character sets. No other rupee symbols or abbreviations have dedicated code points. Most are written as ligatures using the combining diacritic technique: For example, the Nepalese rupee रू is written using U+0930 र DEVANAGARI LETTER RA with U+0942 ू DEVANAGARI VOWEL SIGN UU.

== Abbreviation ==
In Latin script, "rupee" (singular) is abbreviated as 'Re'. and "rupees" (plural) as '₨'. The Indonesian rupiah is abbreviated 'Rp'. In 19th century typography, abbreviations were often superscripted: $R_\cdot^s$ or $R^\underline{s}$. In Brahmic scripts, rupee is often abbreviated with the grapheme for the first syllable, optionally followed by a circular abbreviation mark or a Latin abbreviation point: रु૰ (Devanagari ru.), રૂ૰ (Gujarati ru.), රු (Sinhala ru), రూ (Telugu rū).

Rupee abbreviation in other languages
Language	Word	Transliteration	Abbrev.	Unicode
Punjabi	ਰੁਪਇਆ (Gurmukhi) روپیہ (Shahmukhi)	rpia, rpiya	)	U+1BC1 ੨ Punjabi
Gujarati	રૂપિચો, રૂપિયા	rūpiyo, rūpiyā	રૂ૰	U+0AB0 ર GUJARATI LETTER RA + U+0AC2 ૂ GUJARATI VOWEL SIGN UU + U+0AF0 ૰ GUJARATI ABBREVIATION SIGN
Kannada	ರೂಪಾಯಿ	rūpāyi	ರೂ	U+0CC4 ೄ KANNADA VOWEL SIGN VOCALIC RR
Malayalam	രൂപ	rūpāa	രൂ	( U+0D30 ര MALAYALAM LETTER RA ) + ( U+0D42 ൂ MALAYALAM VOWEL SIGN UU )
Tamil	ரூபாய்	rūbāy	ரூ	( U+0BB0 ர TAMIL LETTER RA ) + ( U+0BC2 ூ TAMIL VOWEL SIGN UU )
Telugu	రూపాయి	rūpāyi	రూ	( U+0C30 ర TELUGU LETTER RA ) + ( U+0C42 ూ TELUGU VOWEL SIGN UU )
Sinhala	රුපියල	rupiyala	රු	(U+0DBB ර SINHALA LETTER RAYANNA) + (U+0DD4 ු SINHALA VOWEL SIGN KETTI PAA-PILLA)

== Exchange rate ==
The history of the rupees can be traced back to ancient India around the 6th century BC with some context even in 1100 BCE. Ancient India had some of the earliest coins in the world, along with the Chinese wen and Lydian staters. The rupee coin has been used since then, even during British India, when it contained 11.66 g (1 tola) of 91.7% silver with an ASW of 0.3437 of a troy ounce (that is, silver worth about US$10 at 2006 prices). Valuation of the rupee based on its silver content had severe consequences in the 19th century, when the strongest economies in the world were on the gold standard. The discovery of vast quantities of silver in the Americas and other European colonies, resulted in a decline in the value of silver relative to gold.

At the end of the 19th century, the Indian silver rupee went onto a gold exchange standard at a fixed rate of one rupee to one shilling and four pence in British currency, i.e. 15 rupees to 1 pound sterling. Following independence, each of these former British colonies established its own national currency (and currency management systems), breaking the link with sterling.

Country	Currency	Symbol	ISO 4217 code	Minor unit	Rupees per U.S. dollar (As of 7 November 2026)	Established	Preceding currency
India	Indian rupee	₹	INR	Paisa = 1/100 rupee	94.03	1540	no modern predecessor
Indonesia	Indonesian rupiah	Rp	IDR	Sen = 1/100 rupiah	18,105	1949	Netherlands Indies gulden
Maldives	Maldivian rufiyaa	Rf, MRf, MVR, .ރ or /-	MVR	Laari = 1/100 rufiyaa	15.46	1945	Ceylonese rupee
Mauritius	Mauritian rupee	₨, रु	MUR	Cent = 1/100 rupee	47.01	1876	Indian rupee, pound sterling, Mauritian dollar
Nepal	Nepalese rupee	रू	NPR	Paisa = 1/100 rupee	150.53	1932	Nepalese mohar
Pakistan	Pakistani rupee	₨	PKR	Paisa = 1/100 rupee	277	1948	British Indian rupee (prior to partition)
Seychelles	Seychellois rupee	R, SR, SRe	SCR	Cent = 1/100 rupee	14.25	1976	Mauritian rupee
Sri Lanka	Sri Lankan rupee	₨, රු, ௹	LKR	Cent = 1/100 rupee	332.48	1885	Indian rupee, pound sterling, Ceylonese rixdollar

== See also ==
- Rupee (The Legend of Zelda), a fictional currency
- The Revised Standard Reference Guide to Indian Paper Money

== Sources and external links ==
- Chisholm, Hugh, ed. (1911). "Rupee" . Encyclopædia Britannica. Vol. 23 (11th ed.). Cambridge University Press. p. 855.
