= Mohur =

Indian gold coin

One and Two Mohur coins
of British India

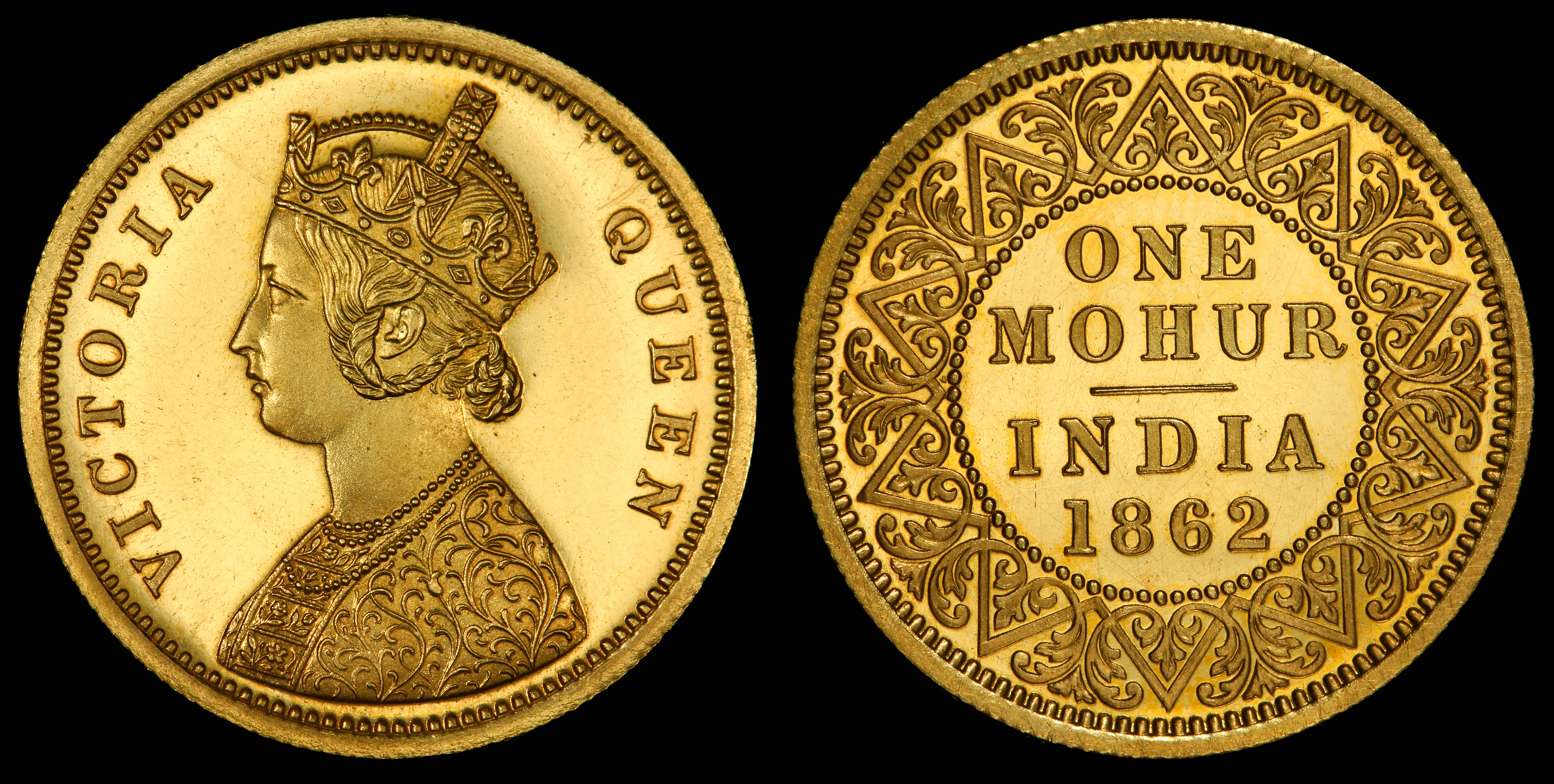
1862 One Mohur

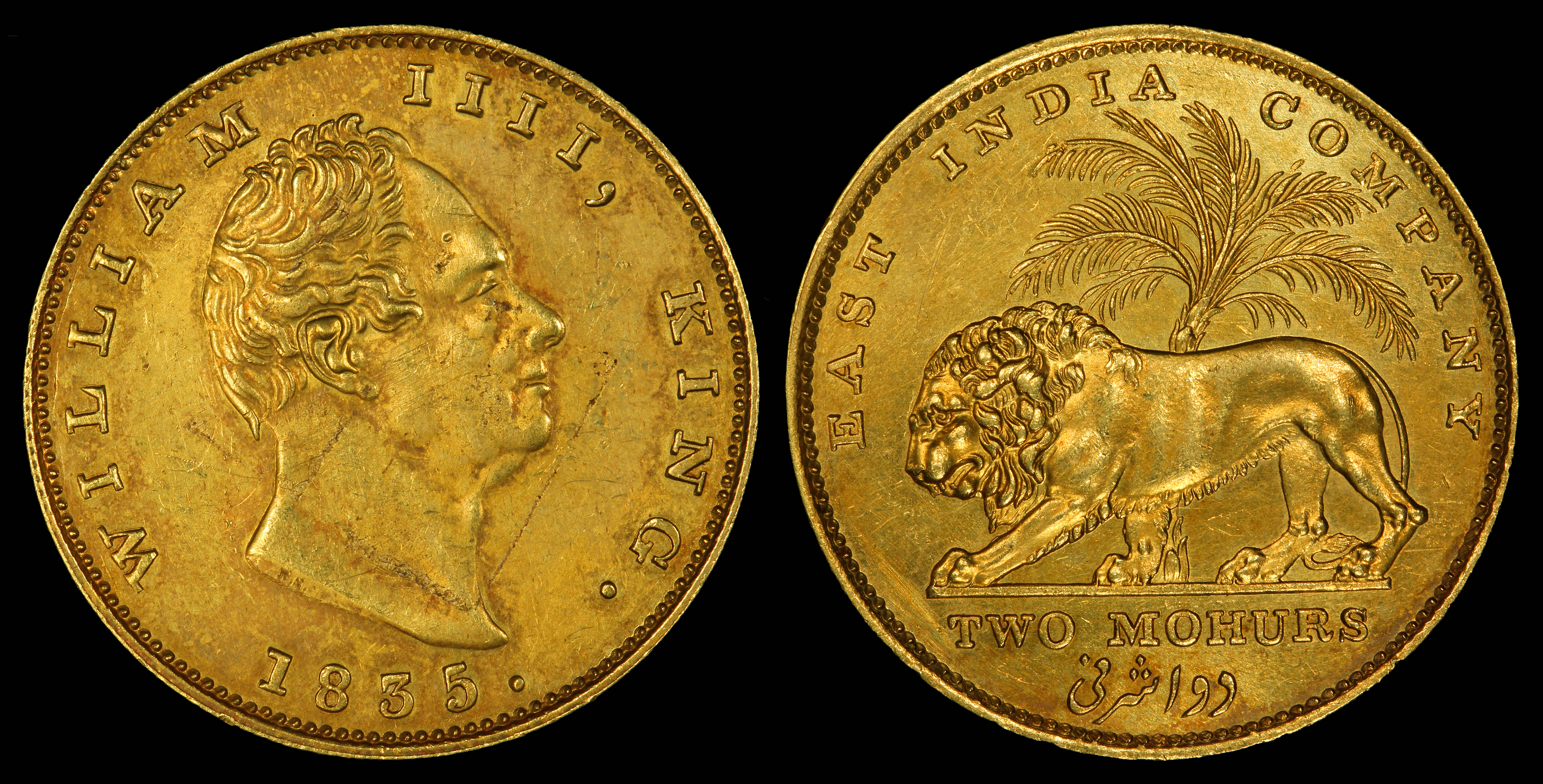
1835 Two Mohurs (Double Mohur) (Note: The 1835 double mohur, also called ashrafi, on average contains 23.32 grams of gold (0.9170 fine) and weighs 0.6875 of an ounce. Only 1,170 were minted.)

The Mohur is a gold coin that was formerly minted by several governments, including British India and some of the princely states which existed alongside it, the Mughal Empire, Maratha Empire, Kingdom of Nepal, and Persia (chiefly Afghanistan). It was usually equivalent in value to fifteen silver rupees. It was last minted in British India in 1918, but some princely states continued to issue the coins until their accession to India after 1947. Similar coins were also issued by the British authorities in denominations of 2/3 mohur (10 rupees), 1/3 mohur (5 rupees) and the double mohur (30 rupees), and some of the princely states issued half-mohur coins (equal to 7 rupees and 8 anna).

The mohur coin was first introduced by Sher Shah Suri of Sur Empire during his rule in India between 1540 and 1545 and was then a gold coin weighing 169 grains (10.95 grams). He also introduced copper coins called dam and silver coins called rupiya that weighed 178 grains (11.53 grams). Later on, the Mughal emperors standardized this coinage of tri-metallism across the sub-continent in order to consolidate the monetary system.

== Etymology ==
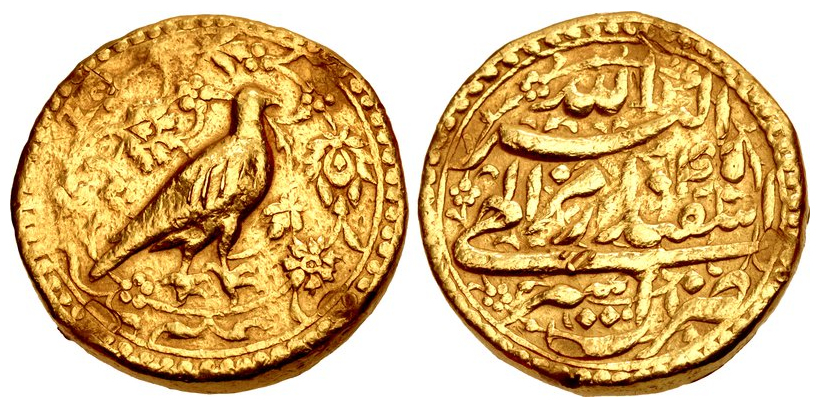
Mohur of the Mughal Emperor Akbar, minted in Asir. This coin with the design of a falcon was issued in the name of Akbar to commemorate the capture of the strategic Asirgarh Fort of the Khandesh Sultanate on 17 January 1601 CE. Legend: "Allah is great, Khordad Ilahi 45, struck at Asir".

The word mohur or mohor (from the Persian word muhr, which means "seal" or "signet ring") is cognate with the Sanskrit word mudrā, which in turn comes from mudraṇam, which also means "seal".

== Collector value ==
Gold mohurs issued by the Mughal Empire, Imperial India, the British East India Company or the British India are valuable collector items and sell in auctions for high prices. The double mohur (minted between 1835 and 1918) with a value of 30 rupees is the highest denomination circulating coin issued till date. An 1835 double mohur was sold at a Bangalore auction for ₹11.5 lakhs making it the highest ever coin bid in India.

== See also ==
- Double eagle
- History of the rupee
- Dam (Indian coin)
- Dam (Nepali coin)
- Nepalese mohur
- Krugerrand (South Africa)
