= Sukaa =

Sukaa or suka (Nepali: सुका) is one of the denominations of the Nepalese rupee. One suka is equal to 25 paisa and four sukas make a rupee. Also, two sukas make a mohor. Sukaas as well as mohors used to circulate extensively in Nepal but these days they are rarely seen in markets.
