= Dam (Indian coin) =

Indian copper coin introduced by Sher Shah Suri

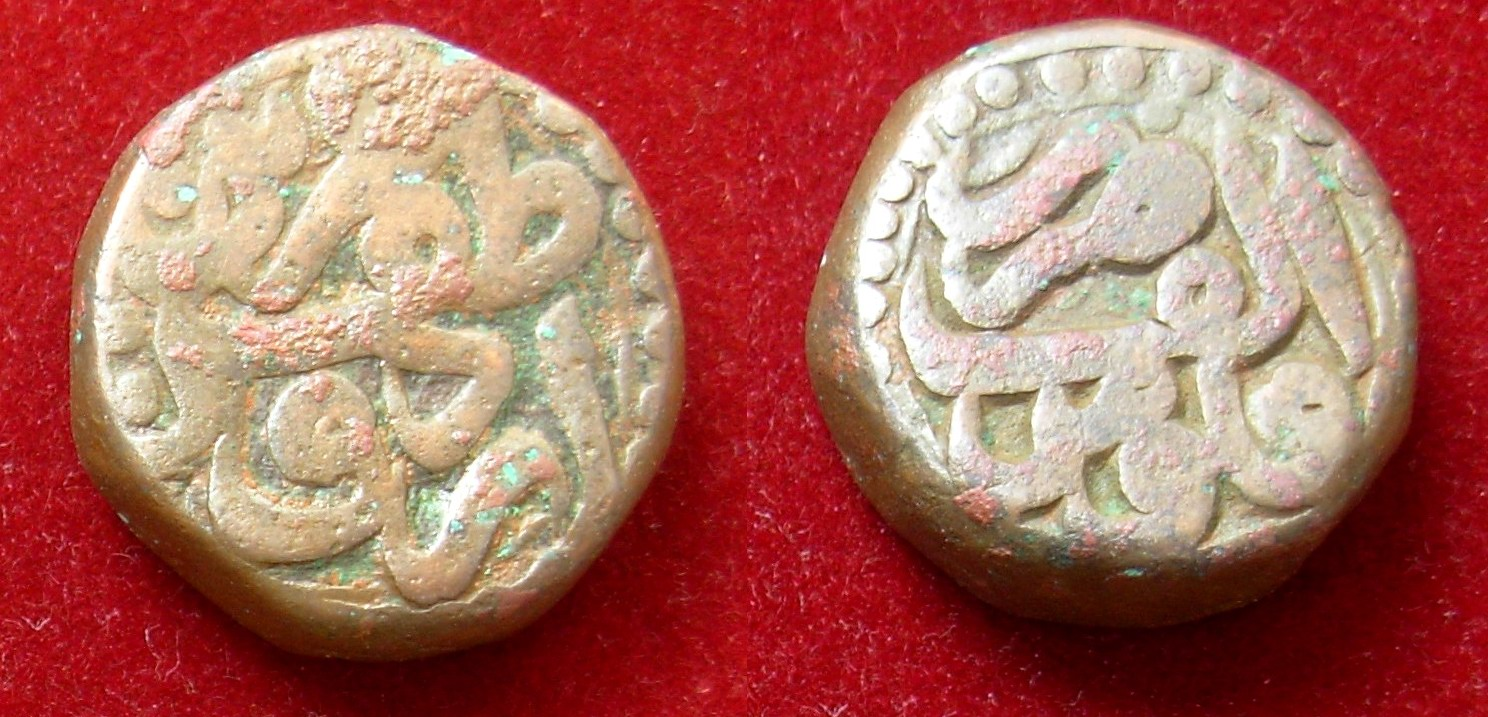
Copper dam of emperor Akbar, Zafar Qarin mint, AH 1100 (1591-92).

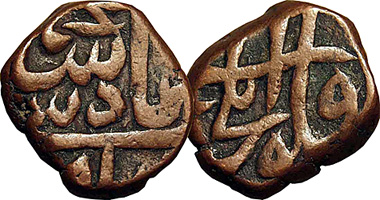
Sher Shah Suri issued Dam, a copper coin with lower value as compared to silver (Rupiya) and gold (Mohur) coins

A dam was a small Indian copper coin. The coin was first introduced by Sher Shah Suri during his rule of India between 1540 and 1545, along with Mohur, the gold coin and Rupiya the silver coin. Later on, the Mughal Emperors standardised the coin along with other silver (Rupiya) and gold (Mohur) coins in order to consolidate the monetary system across India. A rupee was divided into 40 dams and 320 damris.

It is believed that this coin is one of the possible sources for the English word "damn" and the phrase "I don't care a damn", due to its small worth. 'To not care a copper dam', the older version of the phrase, was in use in the 20th century, as is evident from its usage in The Chicago Citizen issued on 27 November 1897, wherein it is stated: 'As a matter of fact, the majority of the people don't care a copper dam about the Arbitration Treaty...'

== See also ==
- Nepalese dam
- Mohur
- Coinage of India
