= Ashrafi =

Historical gold coin of Muslim dynasties

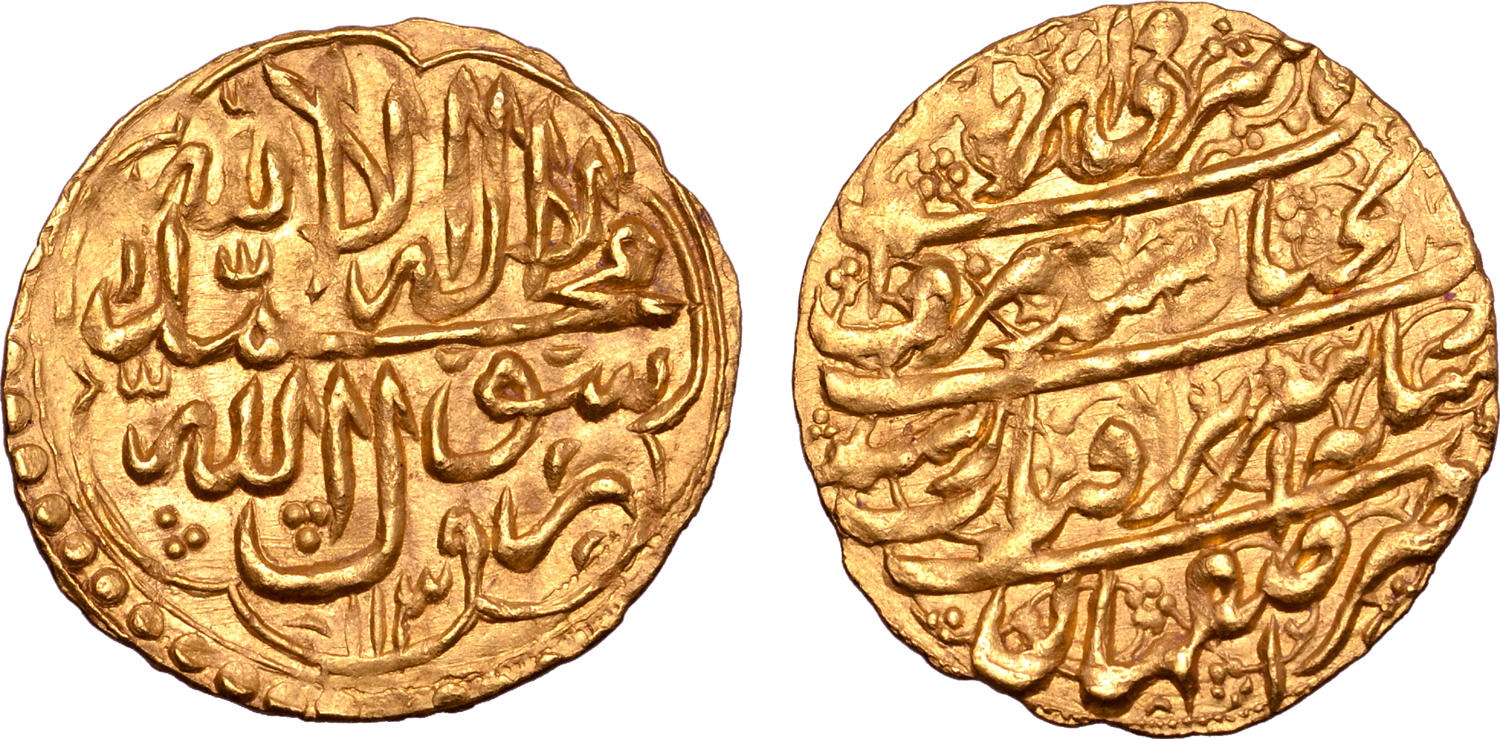
Ashrafi minted in the reign of Shāh Ashraf Hōtak (d. 1730)

Ashrafi (Arabic: أَشْرَفِيّ ) is a gold coin which originated in the Muslim World, and which was later widely adopted as currency in regions under Muslim rule in the Middle East, Horn of Africa, Central Asia, and South Asia.

The coin was first minted in 1407 and was named after al-Ashraf Sayf ad-Dīn Barsbāy (d. 1438), one of the Mamluk rulers of Egypt. It originally weighed 3.45 grams.

== See also ==
- Mohur

== Source ==
- Fragner, B. (2011). "Ašrafī". Encyclopædia Iranica. 2: 797–798.
