= Nepalese mohur =

Currency used in Nepal from 17th to 20th centuries

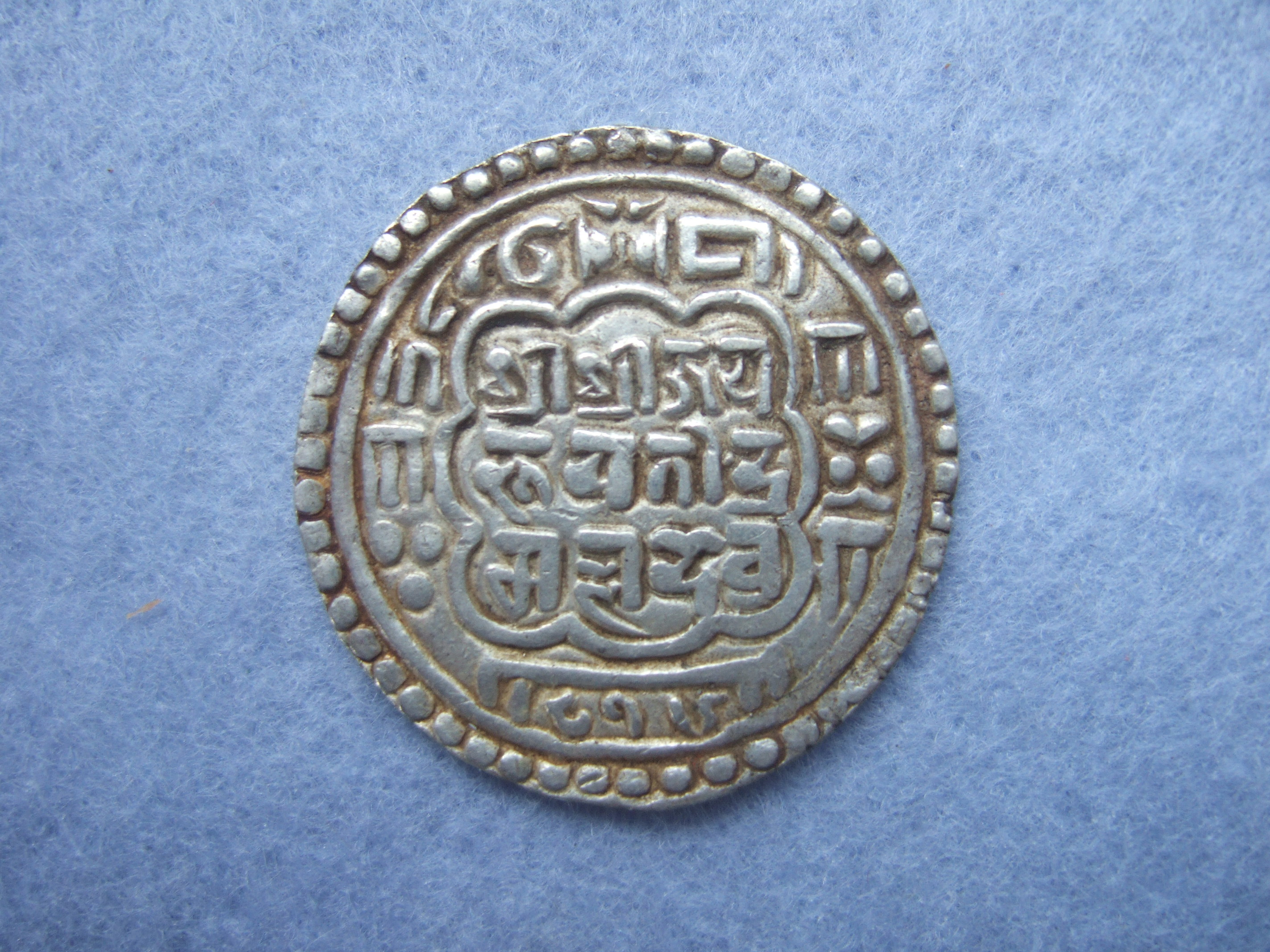
Nepalese silver mohur in the name of King Bhupatindra Malla (ruled 1696-1722) of Bhadgaon (Bhaktapur), dated Nepal Era 816 ( = AD 1696), obverse. Silver mohurs of this type were also exported to Tibet where they circulated along with other Malla mohurs.

The mohur was the currency of the Kingdom of Nepal from the second half of the 17th century until 1932. Silver and gold mohurs were issued, each subdivided into 128 dams. Copper dams were also issued, together with copper paisa worth 4 copper dams. The values of the copper, silver and gold coinages relative to one another were not fixed until 1903. In that year, the silver mohur became the standard currency, divided into 50 paisa. It was replaced in 1932 by the rupee, also called the mohru (Moru), at a rate of 2 mohurs = 1 rupee.

== Coins ==
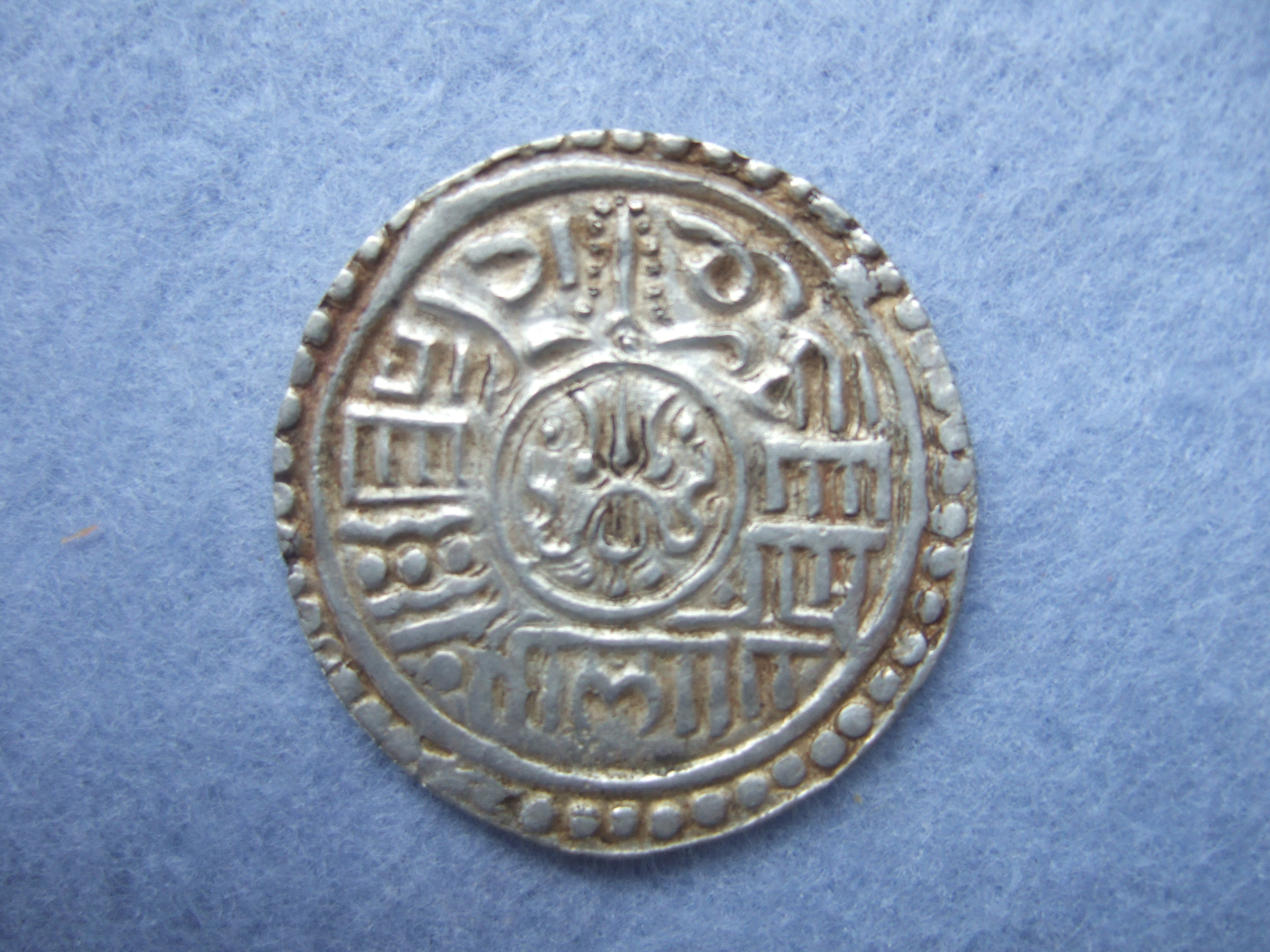
Nepalese silver mohur in the name of King Bhupatindra Malla (ruled 1696-1722) of Bhadgaon (Bhaktapur), dated Nepal Era 816 = AD 1696, reverse.

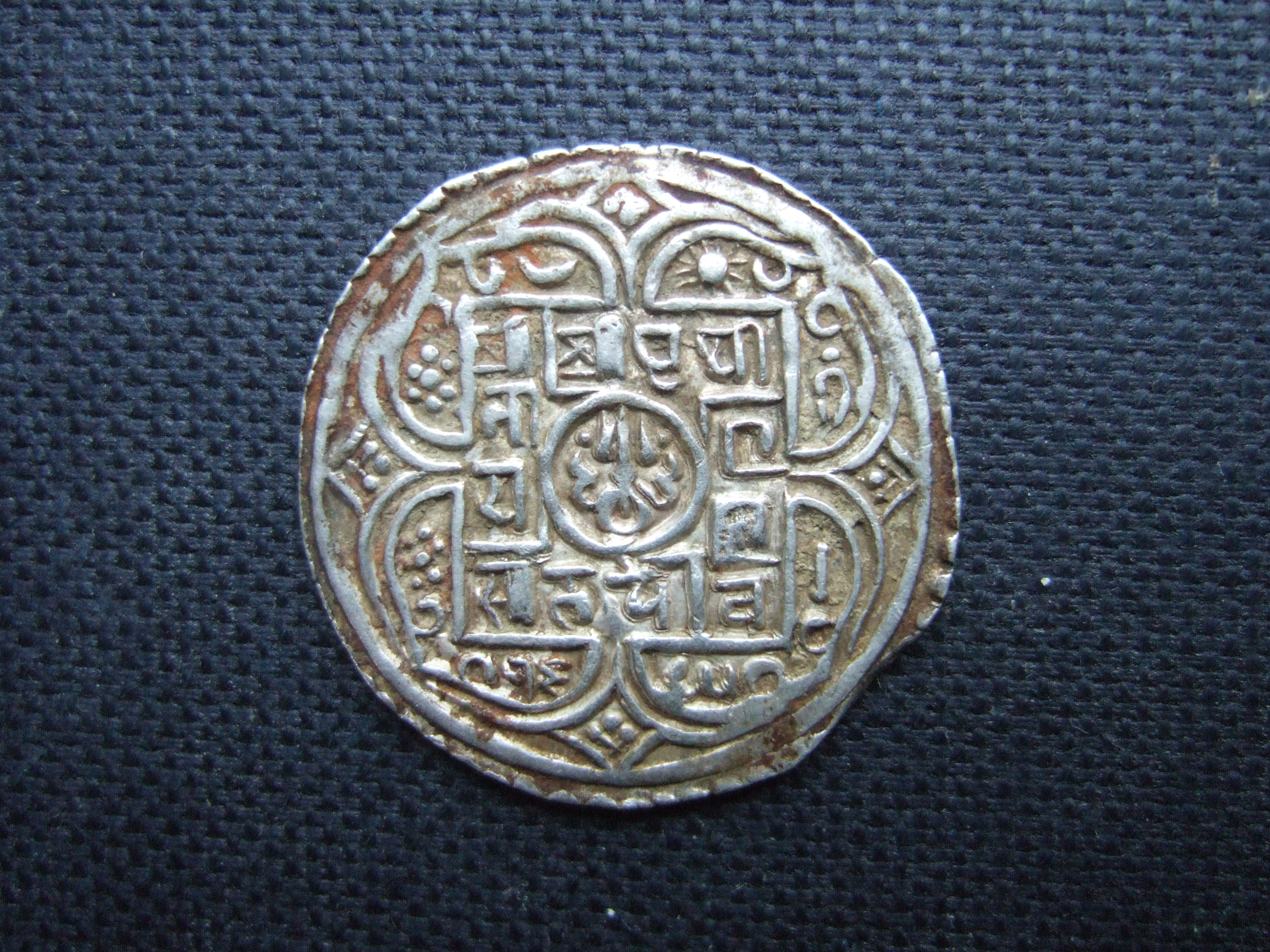
Mohur of king Prithvi Narayan Shah dated Saka Era 1685 (AD 1763).

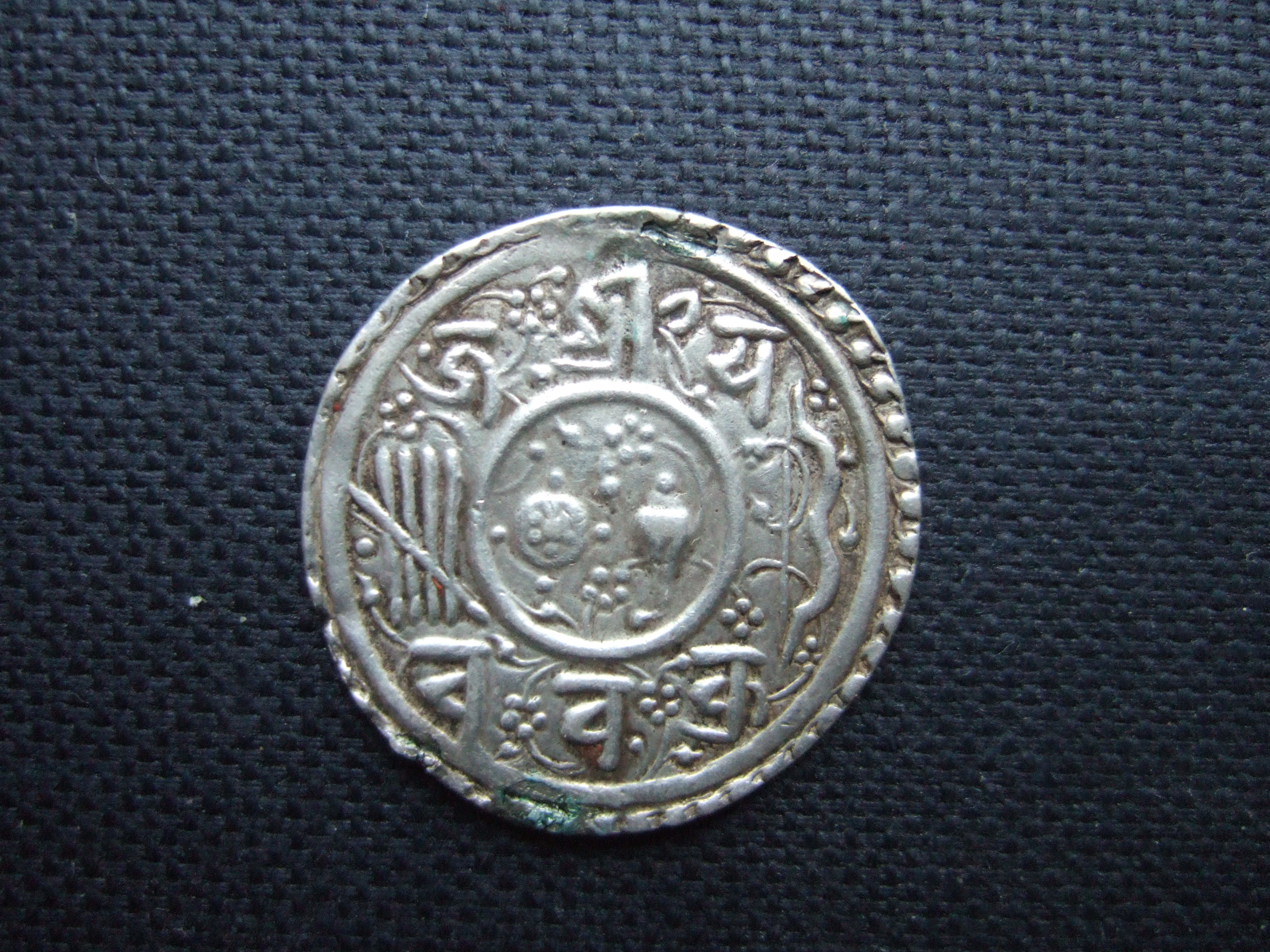
Nepalese silver mohur in the name of king Chakravartendra Malla of Kathmandu, dated Nepal Sambat 789 = AD 1669, obverse.

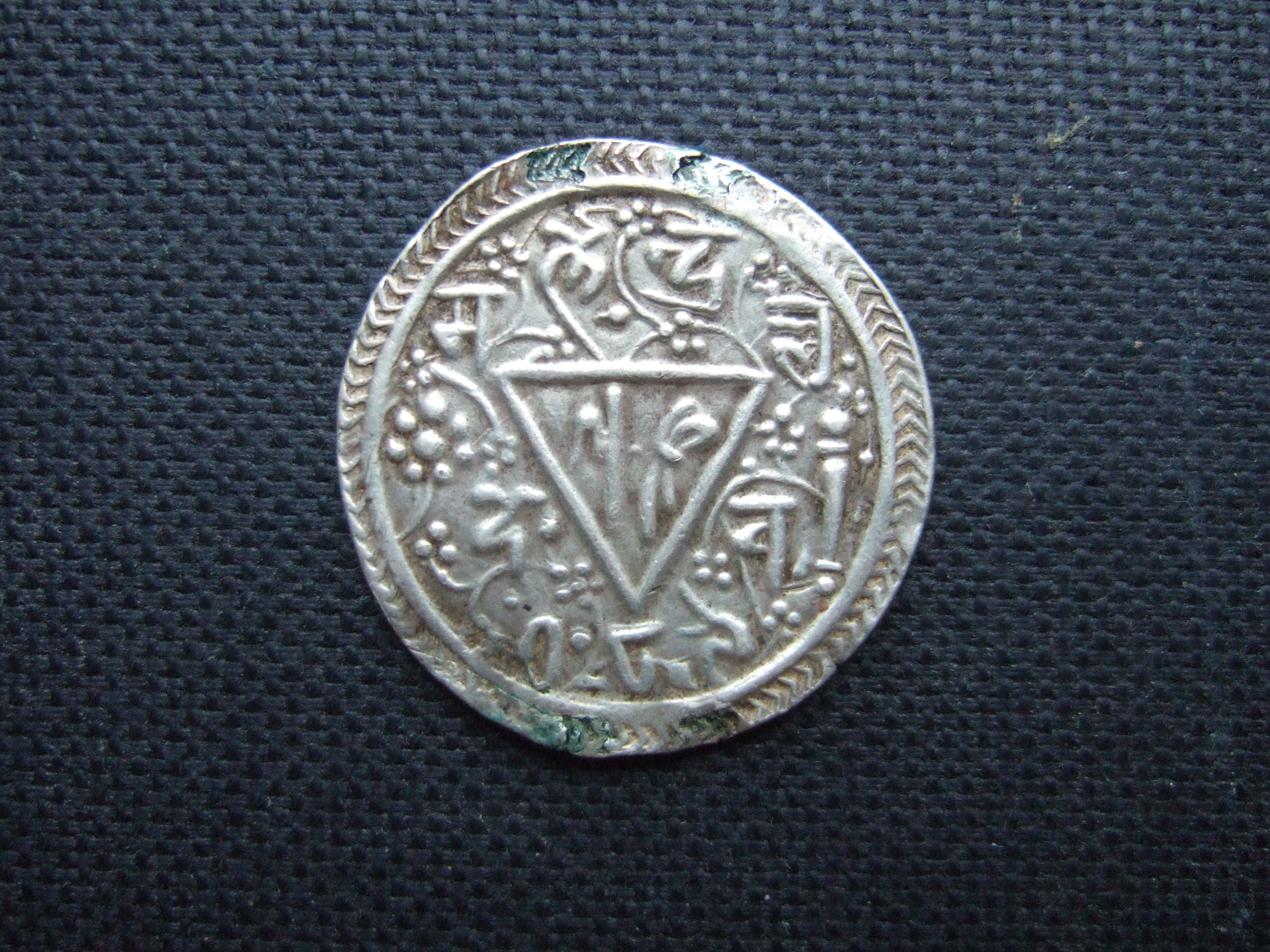
Nepalese silver mohur in the name of king Chakravartendra Malla of Kathmandu, dated Nepal Sambat 789 = AD 1669, reverse.

In the reign of Girvan Yuddha (1799–1816), copper coins were issued for 1 and 2 dam and 2 paisa, with silver coins for 1 dam, 1/32, 1/16, 1/8, 1/4, 1/2, 3/4, 1, 1 1/2 and 3 mohur and gold coins for 1 dam, 1/32, 1/16, 1/8, 1/4, 1/2, 1, 1 1/2 and 2 mohur.

In the reign of the next king (Rajendra, 1816–1847), no copper coins were issued, with silver 3/4, 1 1/2 and 3 mohur discontinued and 2 mohur introduced. Gold 1 1/2 mohur were also discontinued.

Surendra (1847–1881) introduced a new copper coinage in 1866, consisting of 1 dam, 1 and 2 paisa, with 1/2 paisa issued from 1880. The silver coinage consisted of the same denominations as his predecessor, with the gold coinage similar except for the absence of the 2 mohur. The coinage of Prithvi (1881–1911) was very similar to that of Surendra, except for the issue of silver 4 mohur and gold 1/64 mohur.

The copper coinage of Tribhuvan consisted of 1 paisa, with 2 and 5 paisa added in 1919. Silver coins were issued for 1 dam, 1/4, 1/2, 1, 2 and 4 mohur, with gold 1 dam, 1/32, 1/16, 1/8 and 1 mohur. The gold coinage continued to be issued after the introduction of the rupee until 1950.

== See also ==
- Historical money of Tibet
- Coinage of Nepal

== Bibliography ==
- Agrawal (Ghiraiya), Shyam and Gyawali, Kamal Prasad: Notes and Coins of Nepal. Nepal Rastra Bank. Golden Jubilee Year 2005/06, Kathmandu, 2006.
- Joshi, Satya Mohan: Nepali Rashtriya Mudra (National Coinage of Nepal). Lalitpur 2016 (= AD 1961) (182 pp. and 31 plates).
- Joshi, Satya Mohan: Nepali Rashtriya Mudra (National Coinage of Nepal). Lalitpur 2042 (= AD 1985).173 pp. and 40 plates).
- Rhodes, N[icholas] G[ervase], Gabrisch, Karl and Valdettaro Pontecorvo de la Rocchetta, Carlo: The Coinage of Nepal from the earliest times until 1911. Royal Numismatic Society, Special Publication No. 21, London, 1989 (249 pp and 51 plates).
- Shrestha, Mandakini: Catalogue of National Numismatic Museum. His Majesty Government Ministry of Culture, Tourism & Civil Aviation. Department of Archaeology, Chhauni, Kathmandu, B.S. 2062 (= AD 2005).
- Shrestha, Ramesh: Nepalese Coins and Bank Notes (1911 to 1955 CE). Published by Kazi Madhusudan Raj Bhandary, Kathmandu, 2007. ISBN 978-9937200349.
- Walsh, E.H.: The Coinage of Nepal with a Scholarly Introduction by Dr. T.P.Verma. Reprinted by Indological Book House, Delhi and Varanasi, 1973 (Originally published in JRAS in 1908). (91 pp. and 7 plates).
