= Nepalese dam =

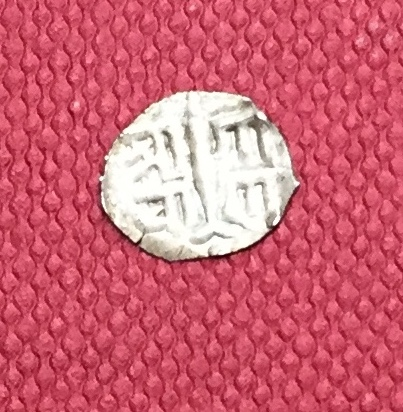
Uni-face Silver Dam Girvana Yuddha

Dam was a small coin, either silver, gold or copper first minted during between c. 1098–1126 CE., replacing old Licchavi coinage.

== History ==
First introduced by King Sivadeva during his between c. 1098 and 1126 CE., replacing old Lichhavi coinage. In the new system Gold Sivaka, Silver Dam and later Nava-Dam-Sivaka and copper Dam were introduced as a new denomination.

== Types ==
Nepali dam were originally made of 1 g pure silver or copper. The copper variety were discontinued in the Malla dynasty and all decreased in size to 0.04 g. They were reintroduced during the Shah period, but only used in the Hill Region and Terai. Silver dams were preferred by the locals of Kathmandu Valley.

== In popular culture ==
Watch Your Language lists the coin as one of the possible sources for the English phrase "I don't give a dam[n]″, due to its small worth.

== Gallery ==
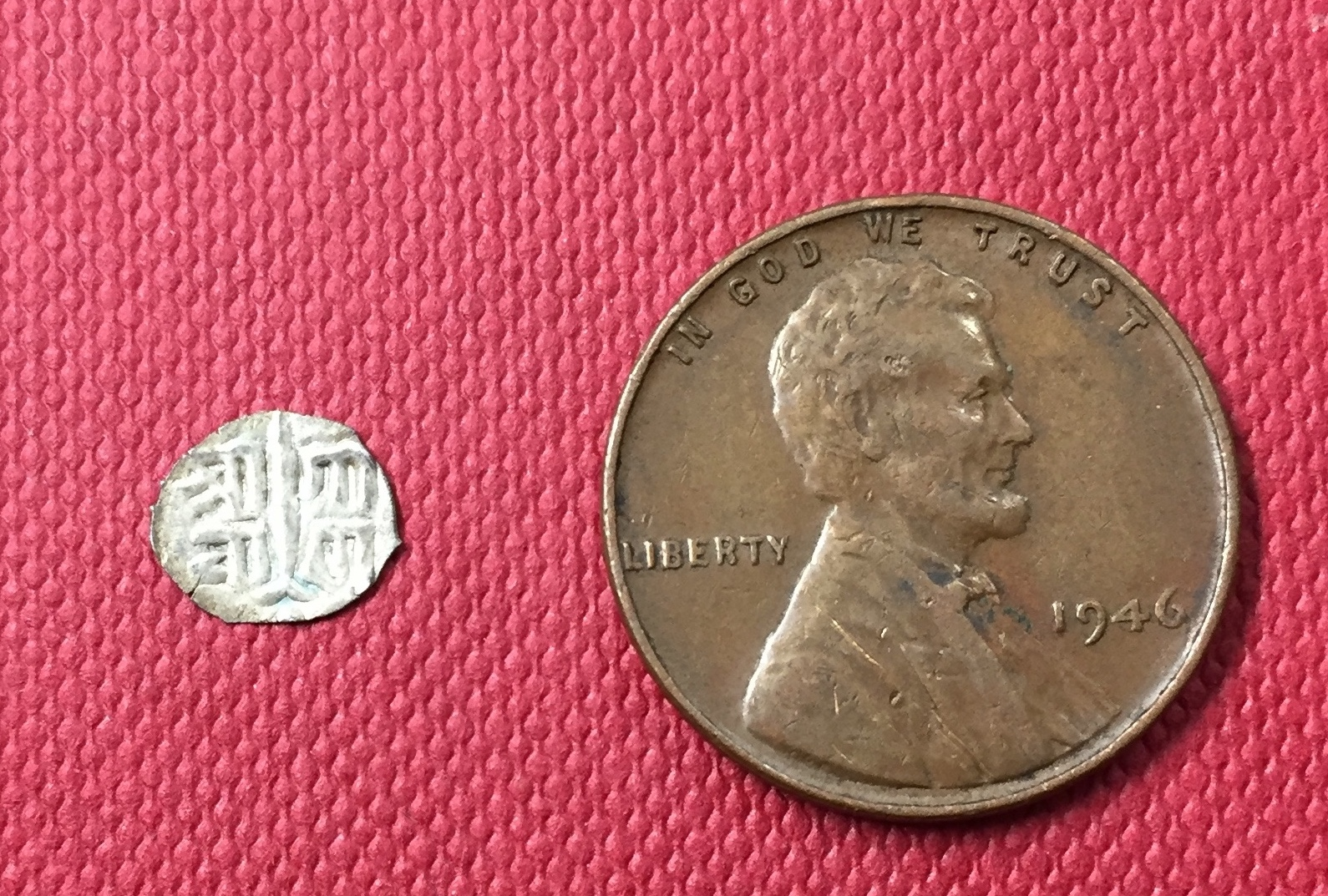
Silver Dam Girvana Yudha compared to US cent.

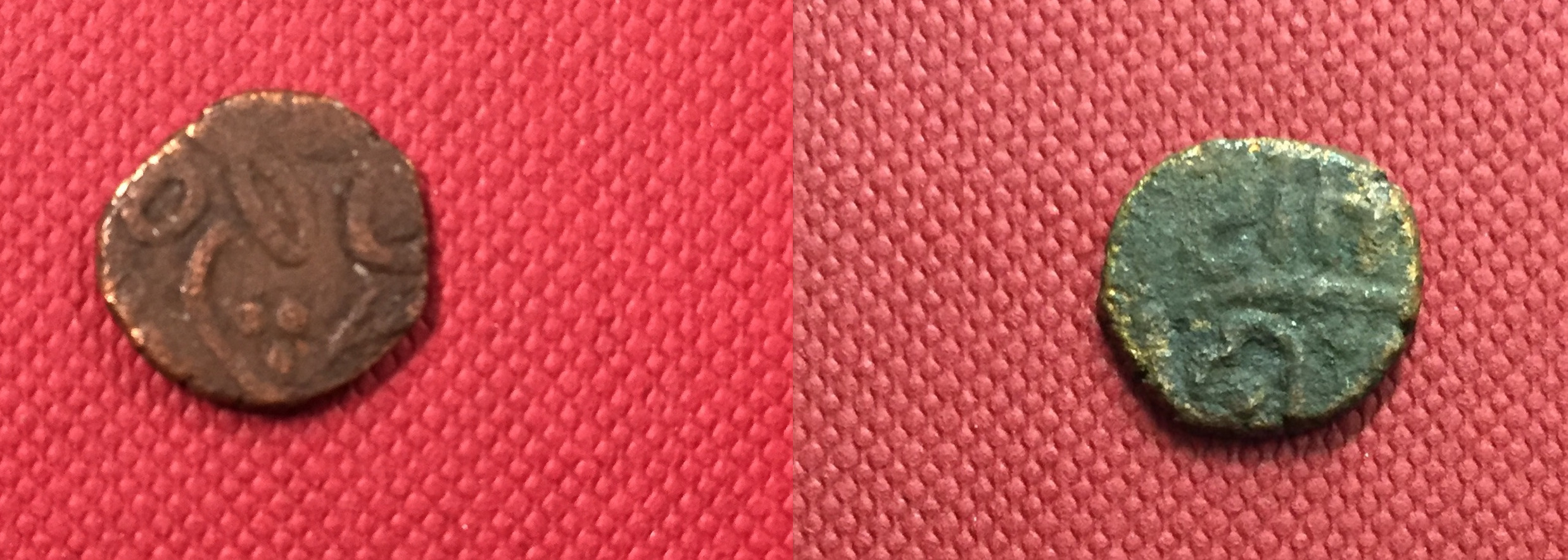
Girvan Yudha Copper Dam in Arabic Script

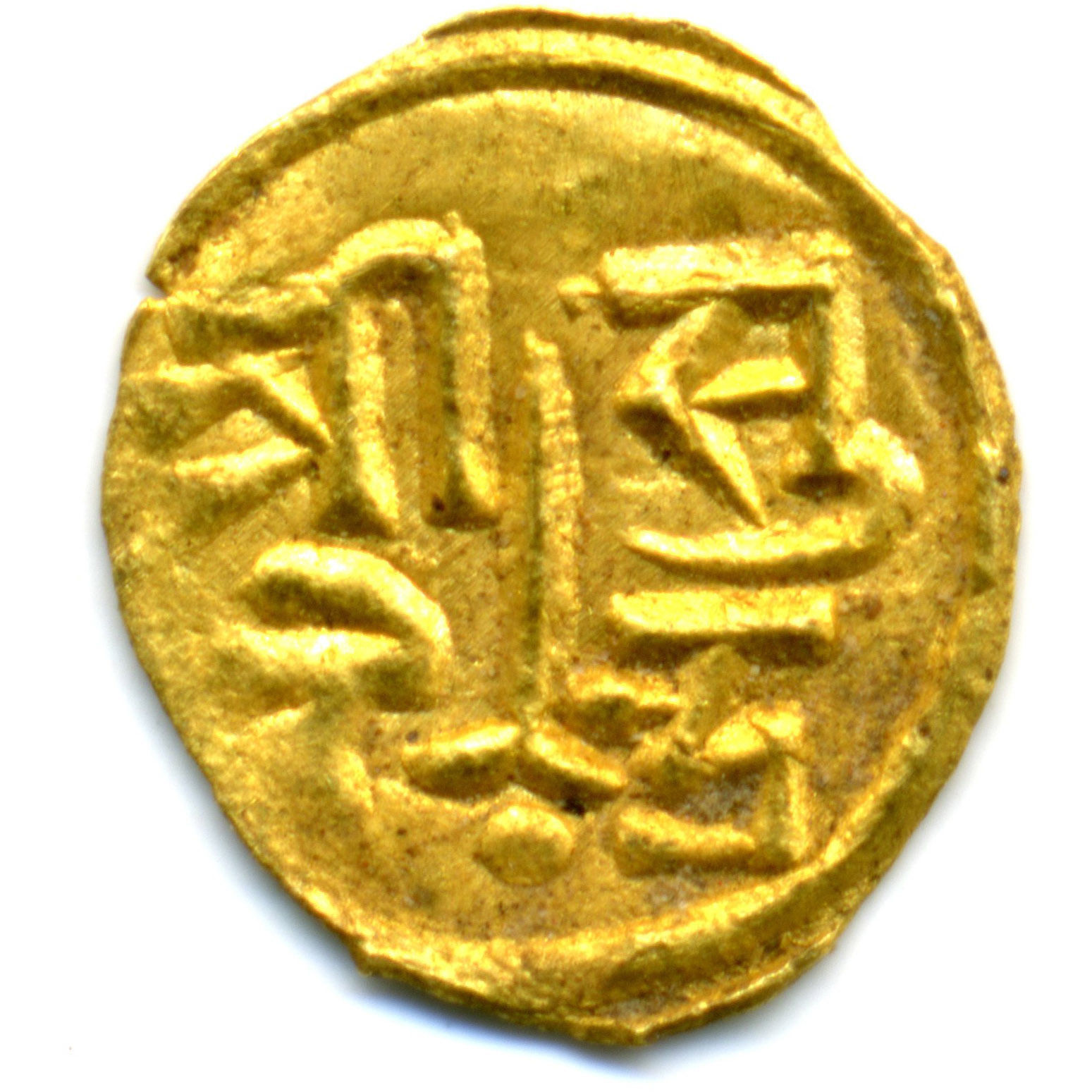
Gold Dam of Surendra

== See also ==
- Dam (Indian coin)
- Nepalese mohur
- Coinage of Nepal
