= Mandla Assembly constituency =

Constituency of the Madhya Pradesh legislative assembly in India

Coordinates: 22.60°N 80.37°E

Mandla
- Constituency No. 107 for the Madhya Pradesh Legislative Assembly

Constituency details
- Country: India
- Region: Central India
- State: Madhya Pradesh
- District: Mandla
- Lok Sabha constituency: Mandla
- Established: 1957
- Reservation: ST

Member of Legislative Assembly
- 16th Madhya Pradesh Legislative Assembly
- Incumbent Sampatiya Uikey
- Party: Bharatiya Janata Party
- Elected year: 2023
- Preceded by: Dev Singh Saiyam

Mandla is one of the 230 Vidhan Sabha (Legislative Assembly) constituencies of Madhya Pradesh state in central India.

It is part of Mandla district.

== Members of the Legislative Assembly ==
Election	Member	Party
1957	Narayani Devi	Indian National Congress
1962	Narayani Devi	Indian National Congress
1967	Narayani Devi	Indian National Congress
1972	Narayani Devi	Indian National Congress
1977	Vijay Datt Jha	Janata Party
1980	Mohanlal	Indian National Congress (Indira)
1985	Himmat Singh Parteti	Indian National Congress
1990	Chhote Lal Uikey	Indian National Congress
1993	Chhote Lal Uikey	Indian National Congress
1998	Devendra Tekam	Indian National Congress
2003	Shivraj Shah	Bharatiya Janata Party
2008	Dev Singh Saiyam	Bharatiya Janata Party
2013	Sanjeev Uikey	Indian National Congress
2018	Dev Singh Saiyam	Bharatiya Janata Party
2023	Sampatiya Uikey	Bharatiya Janata Party

== Election results ==
=== 2023 ===
2023 Madhya Pradesh Legislative Assembly election: Mandla
Party	Candidate	Votes	%	±%
BJP	Sampatiya Uikey	113,135	50.84	+4.84
INC	Ashok Marskole	97,188	43.67	+3.98
BSP	Indar Singh Uikey	3,696	1.66	+0.51
NOTA	None of the above	2,892	1.3	−0.59
Majority		15,947	7.17	+0.86
Turnout		222,535	82.98	+4.17
BJP hold		Swing		

=== 2018 ===
2018 Madhya Pradesh Legislative Assembly election: Mandla
Party	Candidate	Votes	%	±%
BJP	Dev Singh Saiyam	88,873	46.0	
INC	Sanjeev Chhotelal Uikey	76,668	39.69	
GGP	Kishan Lal Uikey	16,746	8.67	
Sapaks Party	Manoj Gontiya	2,580	1.34	
AAP	Premlal Workade (Ret. S.D.M.)	2,465	1.28	
BSP	Laxman(Lachhi Ram) Uikey	2,217	1.15	
NOTA	None of the above	3,642	1.89	
Majority		12,205	6.31	
Turnout		193,191	78.81	
BJP gain from INC		Swing		

== See also ==
Mandla
