= Narayani Devi =

Indian politician

Narayani Devi was an Indian politician from the state of the Madhya Pradesh. She represented Mandla Vidhan Sabha constituency of undivided Madhya Pradesh Legislative Assembly by winning General election of 1957.
