= Shreekhandapur =

श्रीखण्डपुर (Shreekhandapur) श्रीखण्डपुर (खम्पू) Khadpu
- Town
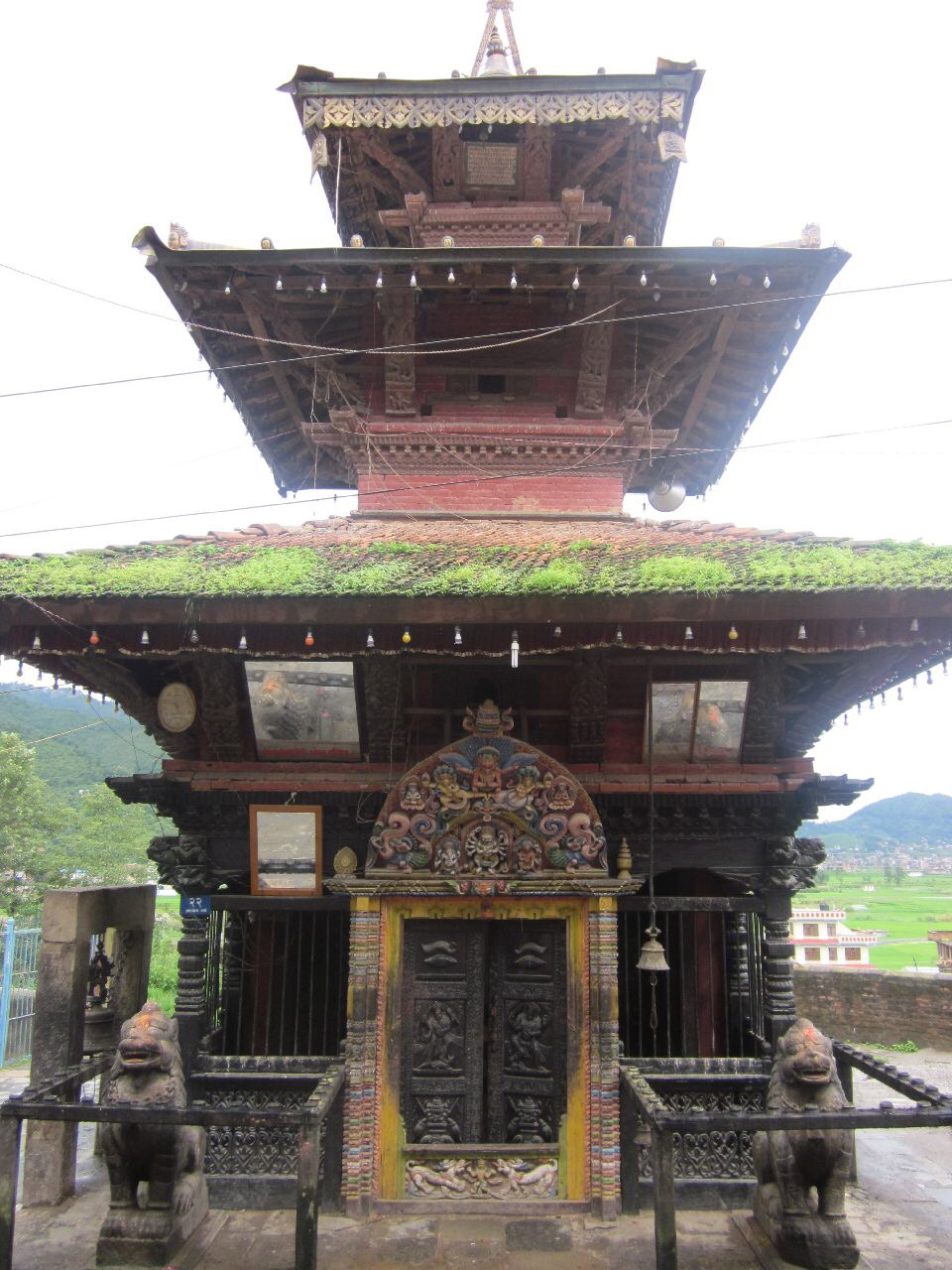
- Swet Bhairav Temple

- Location in Nepal
- Coordinates: 27.615013°N 85.533355°E
- Country: Nepal
- State: Bagmati Pradesh
- District: Kavrepalanchowk
- Municipality: Dhulikhel
- Ward: No. 5
- Chairperson: Pramod Sundar Shrestha
- Elevation: 1,400 m (4,600 ft)

Languages
  - Local: Nepal Bhasa (or Newar language), Nepali
- Area code: 011
- Website: https://jojolopakhampu.com/

Shreekhandapur (Nepal Bhasa: खम्पू) is a historic town located within the Dhulikhel Municipality of Kavrepalanchowk District, Nepal. It lies approximately 28 km east of Kathmandu and is situated at an elevation of around 1,400 metres above sea level.

The main attraction of Shreekhandapur is the temple of Swet Bhairav, which is located about 1 km northeast of the town. The name Shreekhandapur is believed to have originated from the shreekhand (sandalwood) tree, which was once abundant in the area. During the Licchavi period, the town was known as खम्पू (Khampu), a name that continues to be widely used by the local Newar community.

== History ==
Shreekhandapur is regarded as one of the historic towns among the Banepa Seven Towns. According to historical accounts, the name Shreekhandapur is believed to have originated from the abundance of sandalwood (shreekhand) trees that once thrived in the area. Over time, as people from various regions migrated to the town, the sandalwood trees were gradually cleared to make way for human settlements. This deforestation for habitation is said to have given the town its name.

A popular belief suggests that the remains of a sandalwood tree stump at the centre of the town were later enclosed to construct a chaitya (stupa), which still stands today. It is also believed that a statue of Dipankar Buddha was carved from sandalwood found in this region.

== Religious significance ==
According to the Himvat Khanda, six of the sixty-four sacred Shiva Lingas mentioned in ancient texts are located in the Kavre district. One of these, the Dhaneshwar Shiva Linga, is situated to the west of Shreekhandapur. This site, considered a Ugra Tirtha (sacred site of intense energy), is referred to as Raudragiri Parvat. As described in the Nepal Mahatmya, the linga was established by Dhanesh (Kubera), the god of wealth.

It is believed that worshipping the Dhaneshwar Maha Linga brings wealth and prosperity to devotees. Similar descriptions of Dhaneshwar are found in texts that also mention Gaikhureshwar of Dhulikhel. Relevant verses from Chapter 5 include:

Kamadhenu tato lingam sarvakāma phalapradam.

Namnā sansthāpyamās khureśvaram-anuttamam.

(Chapter 5, Verse 7)

Dhaneśa sthāpyamās dhaneśvaram iti dhruvam.(Chapter 5, Verse 5)

== Historical timeline ==
While the exact period of initial settlement in Shreekhandapur is uncertain, inscriptions suggest that the area was inhabited prior to the Lichchhavi era. However, it was during the Malla period that Shreekhandapur developed into a structured town. Although archaeological evidence indicates a history dating back approximately 923 years, the origins of the settlement likely trace back to the Kirat period, which preceded the Lichchhavi era.

During the Kirat period, Banepa was known as Bhujung, Sanga as Sangha, Khopasi as Kurpasi, and Shreekhandapur as Khanpu—also referred to as Khampur in some records. Archaeological findings from nearby locations such as Sanga, Nala, Banepa, Panauti, and Khopasi further support the existence of Shreekhandapur during the Kirat era.

=== Development during the Malla Period ===
Shreekhandapur witnessed significant development during the Malla period. According to the Bhasha Vamsavali, King Ananda Dev consolidated the Banepa Seven Towns, including Shreekhandapur, around the Kaligat Year 4197 (1153 CE). Scattered settlements were organised into structured towns, including Banepa (near the Chandeshwari Temple), Panauti (near the Prayag Tirtha), Nala (near the Bhagwati Temple), Dhulikhel (near the Narayan Sthan), and Shreekhandapur (near the Dhaneshwar Temple).

In Shreekhandapur, four gates and four ponds were constructed as part of town planning. King Ananda Dev also established temples, introduced religious rituals, and set up guthis (trusts) for their maintenance. Roads were paved with bricks and stones, and marketplaces were systematically arranged. The eastern part of Shreekhandapur housed the Layaku Palace, originally a three-storey structure. The present-day building, reconstructed with two storeys, now functions as the local Ward Office.

== Role in the Malla and Post-Malla eras ==
During the reign of King Yaksha Malla, the Bhaktapur Kingdom exercised control over the Seven Towns of Banepa, which included Shreekhandapur, Sanga, Nala, Panauti, Khopasi, and Dhulikhel. After his reign, Yaksha Malla's second son, Ran Malla, governed the region with Banepa as his capital. Following the death of Ran Malla, and up until the unification of Nepal by King Prithvi Narayan Shah, Shreekhandapur and the surrounding towns remained under the jurisdiction of the Bhaktapur Kingdom.

Prithvi Narayan Shah's forces captured Dhulikhel on Kartik 10, 1820 BS (1764 CE), and the following day, they took control of both Panauti and Shreekhandapur. This event marked the beginning of Shreekhandapur's integration into the unified Kingdom of Nepal under Shah's rule.

== Festivals ==
Shreekhandapur has a long-standing tradition of celebrating various festivals and jatras (religious processions). Historical records and local beliefs suggest that arrangements for these jatras and festivals have existed since mythological times. To support the organisation of these events, land and property have been allocated through guthi (religious trusts), which generate the necessary income for conducting rituals and ceremonies.

There are governmental provisions for supporting these festivals, and individuals responsible for overseeing religious processions are traditionally referred to as Dware (gatekeepers). In addition to income from guthis, the municipality also contributes financially to the organisation of certain events. Some jatras are specifically managed by guthiyars (custodians of the guthi).

Among the many jatras celebrated in Shreekhandapur, the most prominent is the Bisket Jatra.

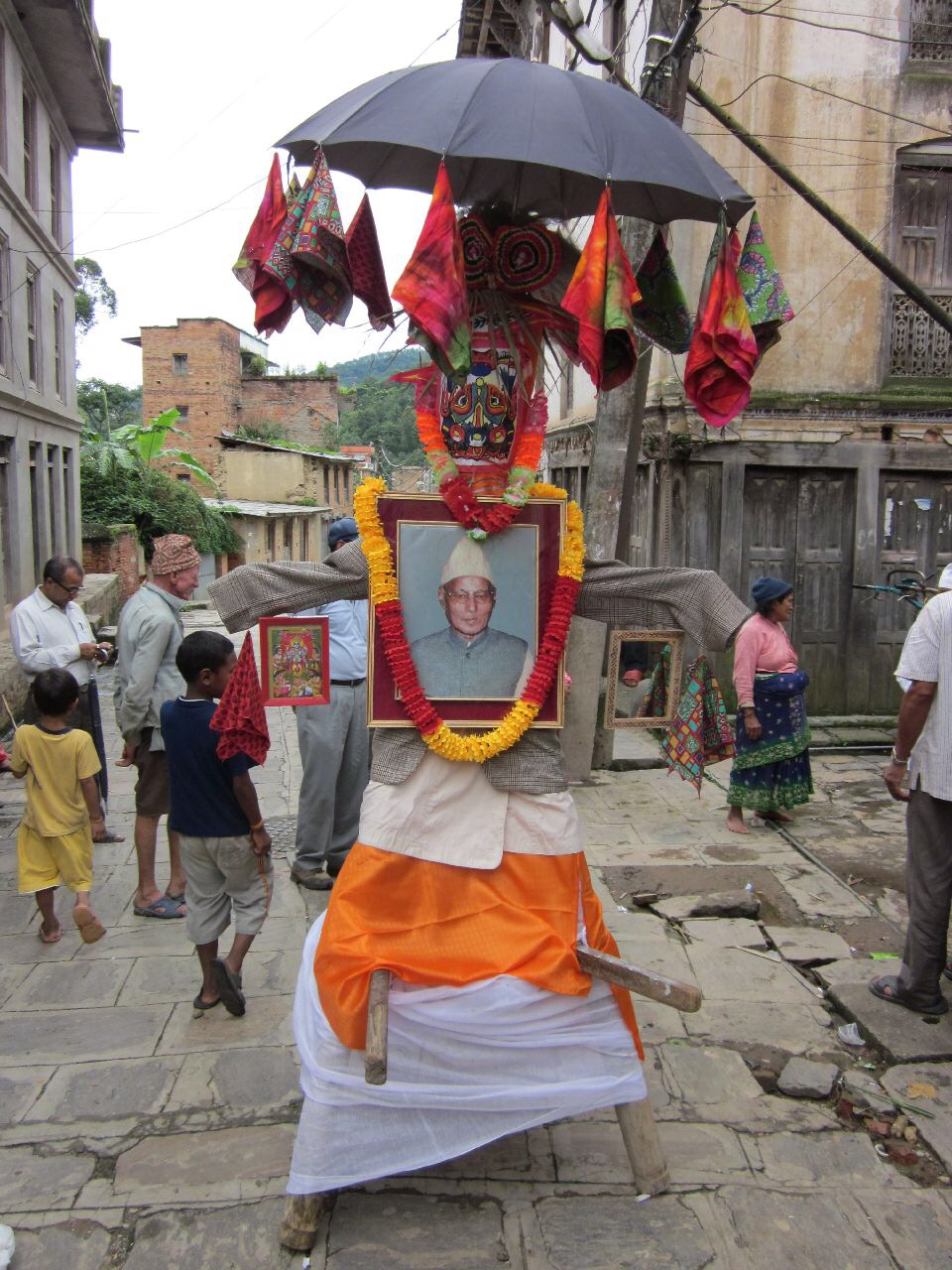

=== Bisket Jatra ===
Bisket Jatra is a major festival celebrated during the New Year period according to the Bikram Sambat calendar. For the local residents, it holds importance equivalent to that of the Dashain festival. As part of the celebration, a tree is brought from the nearby Mahankal forest and erected in the town for a duration of seven days.

During the festival, statues of deities such as Ganesh, Kumar, and Bhairav are placed in specially constructed chariots (raths) and taken in procession through different parts of the town.

=== Gai Jatra ===
Gai Jatra is another significant festival observed annually by the local community to honour deceased family members. The festival serves as a public expression of grief and remembrance and is also marked by traditional performances and satirical acts.

== Geography ==
Shreekhandapur is an ancient town located in the Hocho Thumko area, under Ward No. 5 of Dhulikhel Municipality. Geographically, it lies at approximately 6 degrees east longitude and 28 degrees north latitude, adjacent to the Punyamati River.

To the south of Shreekhandapur lies the mythological city of Palati, a significant pilgrimage site, particularly during the Baharwarsi Makar Mela. Also to the south is Chakor, believed to be the meditation site of the sage Chakor. To the north is Bhujung, a locality that is part of Banepa and recognised as a commercial hub in the eastern region of Banepa. The revered pilgrimage site Gosainthan and Budol, the 11th Ward of Banepa, are also located to the north.

To the east is the popular tourist destination of Dhulikhel, while to the west lies the Chaleshwar Forest, home to the Mahakali Devi shrine. This forested area is known for its natural beauty and is a popular picnic spot. The religious site of Dhaneshwor Mahadev is also situated in this vicinity.

Shreekhandapur enjoys a temperate climate, neither too hot nor too cold, making it a comfortable place to live. The town is known for its clean air, peaceful environment, and natural beauty. Historically, it was designed with four gates, each connecting to a different direction:

- The eastern gate leads to the road from Wahatol to Dhulikhel.
- The western gate connects to the road that crosses the Punyamati River towards Dhaneshwor.
- The northern gate opens onto the road from Bhairav Temple to Budol.
- The southern gate leads to the road from Lasa Kotol to Chokot.

The Punyamati River flows to the west of the town. In the west, within Chaleshwar Forest, lies the Mahakali Devi shrine. To the east is Tapukhu, a pond, while to the south is Mahadev Pokhari, a walled pond featuring a statue of Mahadev at its centre. To the north is Saraswati Pukhu, with a temple dedicated to Saraswati situated on its eastern bank. These water bodies reflect the foresight of earlier generations in planning for future water needs.

Despite its small size, Shreekhandapur has evolved into a trade centre amidst residential surroundings. The town is predominantly inhabited by members of the Newar community. Historically, it served as the eastern gateway of the Eastern Ward 1. With time, newer settlements have expanded beyond the original town limits.

Traditionally, families from various Newar castes such as Shrestha, Pradhan, Karmacharya, Suwal, Ranjitkar, Manandhar, Dhujju, Mahaju, Gubhaju, Prajapati, Napit, Shah, Jugiju, Putuwar, Rajbharat, among others, resided in the town. In recent years, people from other communities have also begun settling in Shreekhandapur.

The town is divided into several neighbourhoods (tols), some of which have been named for centuries, while others are relatively new. Notable neighbourhoods include:

- Wahatol: Located on the eastern side of Shreekhandapur, this area is home to the Waha (Layaku Durbar). The name "Wahatol" is believed to have originated from the presence of the royal palace.
- Nashtol: The name is derived from the Nasdyo (Nath deity) worshipped in the area. It is also referred to as Nathtol.
- Bhookhatol: This name comes from the words bhoo (earth/land) and kha (to shake), signifying the occurrence of an earthquake in ancient times. It is believed that the area remained undamaged, hence the name Bhookhatol (or Bhukhatol).
- Basatol: According to local lore, a family conducting a ritual during the Newar kings' reign jokingly claimed their surname to be Chaatne Patne Raja Kaatne (those who cut the king). Alarmed by this, the king's officials ordered their expulsion. The family fled and settled near the Punyamati River in Shreekhandapur. Over time, they began celebrating Dashain in the area, and the neighbourhood became known as Basatol.
- Chaf Tol: Named after the presence of a chaf (paati, or resting place) in the area.
- Lasa Kotol: The name is derived from the performance of Laskus (ritual dances or ceremonies) during the Biska Jatra. These rituals were traditionally held in this neighbourhood.
- Yakakshe Tol: This area was named Yakakshe because, in earlier times, it had only one house. The name has remained since.

Newer neighbourhoods such as Shahi Tol, Manandhar Tol, New Bast, and Magar Tol have also emerged, reflecting the town's gradual growth and demographic changes. Each of these tols has its own distinct history, cultural identity, and local legends associated with its origin.

== Education ==
In Banepa, educational development gained momentum around 2003 BS (1946 CE) with the establishment of institutions such as Ganesh School and Japanese School, though the latter operated only for a brief period. As part of this broader educational initiative, several other schools were founded during the same period, including Indreshwar School in Panauti, Shri Krishna School in Dapcha, Bhagyodaya School in Nala, and Shri Shwet Bhairav School in Shreekhandapur. These schools received formal recognition from the Government of Nepal in Chaitra 2007 BS (1951 CE).

In Shreekhandapur, the advancement of education was significantly supported by local figures such as Bharat Raj Shrestha and philanthropist Krishna Gopal Dhunju. Shri Shwet Bhairav School was officially approved on Chaitra 16, 2007 BS, and commenced operations with the active involvement of education advocates from Banepa, including social workers like Hansraj Shrestha and Bharat Raj Shrestha. Initially, classes were conducted in the rest house of the Shwet Bhairav Temple, and the school was later relocated to Layaku Durbar. Bharat Raj Shrestha served as the founding teacher, succeeded by Pandit Homanath Upadhyay.

Krishna Gopal Dhunju also played a vital role in expanding educational opportunities in the area. In 2027 BS (1970 CE), Shri Janajagriti School was established under the leadership of Damodar Sharma Adhikari, with Dhunju contributing significantly to the construction of the school building. To consolidate and strengthen educational infrastructure in Shreekhandapur, Shri Shwet Bhairav School and Shri Janajagriti School were later merged to form Shreekhandapur Secondary School, which continues to play an important role in local educational development.

At present, Shreekhandapur has one government-operated higher secondary school and one government primary school. Additionally, there are several private institutions in the area, including SOS Hermann School, Golden Siddhartha School, and Santalam School. The government secondary school, which was upgraded to the secondary level in 2035 BS (1978 CE), now functions as a higher secondary school.

== Kimbadanti (legend): Mythological tales and introductions ==
=== Sri Nakh Bhagwati ===
According to local legend, Sri Nakh Bhagwati is a deity originally from Shreekhandapur. One day, while travelling, she passed through Jaleshwar and reached the Panauti Ghat, where she bathed before returning home. On her way back, she encountered a beautiful girl sitting and crying in the middle of Panauti. Around the same time, the residents of Shreekhandapur, who were searching for Bhagwati, found her there. When they approached her, she said that she would return only if they brought her gold jewellery.

The people of Shreekhandapur set out to fulfil her demand. Meanwhile, residents from Dhulikhel also arrived and tried to convince her to accompany them. She gave them the same condition. The people of Dhulikhel, however, crafted a garland from lauka and ghiraula flowers, which they offered to her. She accepted it and agreed to go with them.

When the people of Shreekhandapur returned with real gold jewellery, they found that Bhagwati had already left with the Dhulikhel group. As she was being taken to Dhulikhel, the people of Shreekhandapur intercepted her on a hill and requested her return, but she refused. To symbolise their grievance and deception, they cut off the tip of her nose (nakh) and took it back to Shreekhandapur, where they installed it and began worshipping it as Nakh Bhagwati.

=== Shorakhutte Pati (sixteen-pillared pavilion) ===
Shorakhutte Pati was a three-storeyed pavilion constructed in the centre of Shreekhandapur. Supported by sixteen wooden pillars, it was named Shorakhutte (meaning "sixteen pillars"). A small door was built on the ground floor, which, in ancient times, served as a temporary prison for criminals such as thieves and robbers. It functioned as a site of punishment to deter crime.

The upper floors were used for deliberation, where community elders held Panch Bhaladmi meetings to decide appropriate punishments. During the Indra Jatra festival, a statue of Lord Indra was traditionally placed at the top of the pavilion. Unfortunately, the original structure has now been demolished and replaced by a health post. Local stakeholders have called for municipal or government funding to reconstruct the pavilion and preserve its cultural significance.

=== Kwenawasi Ganesh Than ===
According to oral tradition, the Kwenawasi Ganesh Than is a site where water is said never to dry up, and it is believed to be a gateway to the underworld. A tantric practitioner from Chobhar once came to test the power of the deity Ganesh. During his rituals, he interpreted the large size of the idol to represent the vastness of both the heavens and the underworld, while its smaller form symbolised something infinitesimally small.

The tantric practitioner eventually took the idol to Chobhar. Upon learning of this, the people of Shreekhandapur attempted to retrieve it but were unsuccessful. The residents of Chobhar insisted that the idol now belonged to them. As a result, a new shrine was established in Shreekhandapur, where Kwenawasi Ganesh continues to be worshipped.

To this day, worshippers from Shreekhandapur visit the temple in Chobhar. According to tradition, animal sacrifices at the Chobhar temple may only be performed after the devotees from Shreekhandapur have completed their worship and departed.

=== Navadurga festival ===
In earlier times, fishing was not part of the Navadurga festival in Shreekhandapur. However, on one occasion, a villager began fishing during the festival, which led to disruptions believed to be caused by the displeasure of the deities.

The leader of the deity group consulted an elderly tantric practitioner to understand the disturbance. The tantric revealed that fishing was prohibited in the area where the deity Shwet Bhairav resided and that this act had caused the unrest. The village leader agreed to cease fishing activities during the festival.

Since then, fishing has been forbidden during the Navadurga jatra. Previously, fishing was an integral part of the celebration, but after this incident, only four deities are taken out in procession, and no fish are caught.

=== Religious mantra ===
"Om Gananaam Tva Ganapatim Havamahe"

This sacred mantra is an invocation to Lord Ganesh, seeking his blessings for wisdom, knowledge, and success. It is often recited during prayers, worship, and festivals associated with Ganesh, and frequently referenced in mythological stories across the region.
