= Banepa =

Municipality in Bagmati Province, Nepal

Banepa: बनेपा (Nepali); भोंत/भोंदेय् (Newar); Bandikapur, Bhonta, Bhon Deya
- Municipality
- Banepa Municipality
- Banepa Bazar in 2025

- Location in Nepal Banepa (Nepal) Banepa (Asia)
- Coordinates: 27°37′47″N 85°31′13″E
- Country: Nepal
- Province: Bagmati
- District: Kavrepalanchok
- Established: 1096; 930 years ago
- No. of Wards: 14

Government
  - Type: Mayor–council government
  - Body: Banepa Municipal Government
  - Mayor: Mr. Shanti Ratna Shakya
  - Deputy Mayor: Ms. Bimala Sapkota Dahal
  - Executive officer: Mr. Shiva Prasad Humagain

Area
  - Total: 54.59 km^{2} (21.08 sq mi)
- Elevation: 1,500 m (4,900 ft)

Population (2021)
  - Total: 67,629
  - Density: 1,239/km^{2} (3,209/sq mi)
- Time zone: UTC+5:45 (NST)
- Post code: 45210
- Area code: 011
- Website: www.banepamun.gov.np

Banepa (Nepali: बनेपा) is a municipality and historical town in a valley situated at about 1,500 m (4,900 ft) above sea level in central Nepal which is at about 25 kilometres (16 mi) east from Kathmandu. At the time of the 2021 Nepal census, it has a population of 67,690. The main attraction of Banepa is the temple of Chandeshwori, located approximately 1 km (0.62 mi) northeast of the town along the Rudramati River. The Dhaneshwor Temple is 1 kilometre south of the town. Banepa is also known for its eight different temples of Ganesh, Narayanthan (the temple of Narayan), Bhimshenthan (the temple of Bhimshen), and eight different ponds.

== History ==
Some of the ancient names of Banepa were Banepur, Baniyapur, Banipur. As it had trade relationship with Tibet from ancient period, Banepa is also known as "Bhont", "Bhonta", "Bhon dey (भोंदेय्)". Banepa is the combination of two words i.e. "Bane" means 'Business' and "Pa" means 'Place'. Therefore, "Banepa" means 'Place of Business'.

It is believed that when entire Kathmandu Valley was covered with lake, there was a settlement in Banepa.

By early Lichchavi period (5th-8th century), settlements existed at Sanga (Sangagrama), Banepa, Nala, Panauti, Khopasi, Palanchowk, Dumja and probably Dolakha, Lele (Lembatidrangga), Chitlang valley and even up to Gorkha. (Slusser, 1982).

Thakuri period (879 – 1200 A.D.) : Bhaktapur and Banepa was the core political area.

Malla Period (1200–1769 A.D.) : King Anandedeva Malla united the scattered villages and made modern Banepa surrounded by eight gates with a statue of Ganesh at each of the gates in eight different directions in Kaligat Year 4197 (around 1153 B.S.). He also built a temple of Chandeshwari Temple and arranged a trust fund for the goddess.

After having had the favours and directions of goddess Chandeshwori, King Anandadeva Malla founded seven villages:

- Banepa near Chandeshwori Pitha
- Shreekhandapur near Dhaneshwor
- Panauti near Prayaga Tirtha of Nepal
- Nala near Nala Bhagawati
- Dhulikhel near Narayana
- Chaukot near the resident of Chaukora Rishi
- Sanga, near Nasika Pitha.

== Old town ==
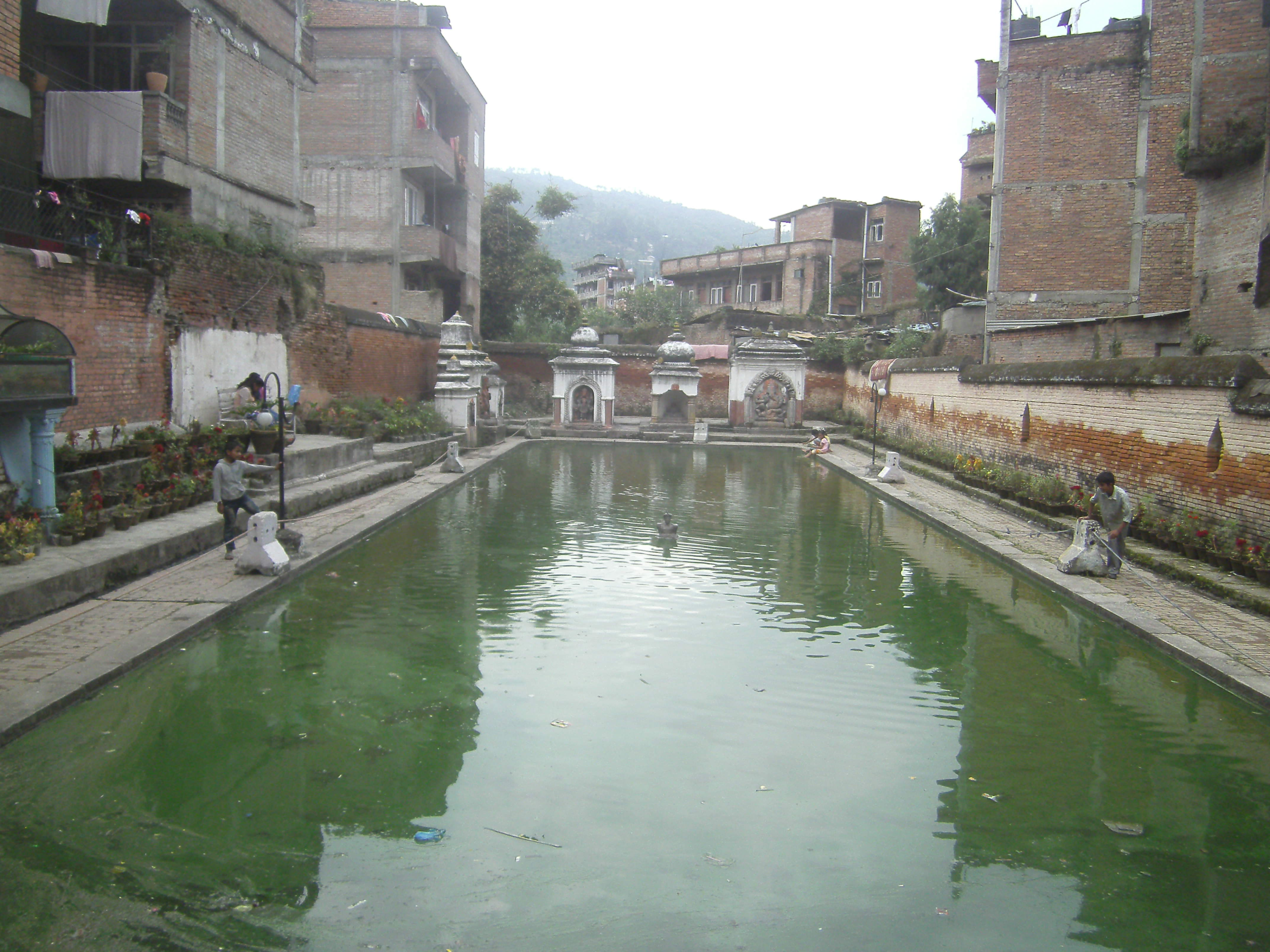
Pond of Waku Ganesh Temple

This old town is located at the central part of the city. It is surrounded by 8 ganesh temples with 8 adjacent ponds and Phalchaa (फल्चा). The name of the Ganesh temples are:

- Tukampwo (तुकम्प्वो) Ganesh at South (Temple of Tukampwo Ganesh was established first of all other Ganesh Temple by King Anandadeva Malla after forming new Kingdom of Banepa. It is also the major temple of Banepa.)
- Kobha (कोभः) Ganesh at Southeast
- Waku (वकु) Ganesh at East
- Thachhu (थाछु) Ganesh at North
- Kanthu (कांथु) Ganesh at Northeast
- Kwonla (क्वोंला) Ganesh at Southwest
- Talapukhu (तलाःपुखु) Ganesh at West
- Jyasanani (ज्यासःननी) Ganesh at Northwest

These Ganesh temples are said to be the boundaries of old Banepa. The main temple of Banepa city was Chandeshwori Temple along the Rudramati River.

Along with this, King Ananda Dev Malla also built wells and taps for providing the people of Banepa with the good source of water. But many of those ponds have been used for public uses and some 'Phalchaa' do not have any existence today.

== Present situation ==
Punyamata River, which was the major source of drinking water, irrigation and many other activities, is being polluted day by day. The bank of Punyamata River has been a place where solid wastage has been disposed. The sewage has been connected directly to the river without any treatment and in an unmanaged way has adversely affected the river water. Waste materials produced from local industry have turned the river water black. The surrounding countryside is also being polluted.

Although Banepa is a small place of an area of 5.56 square kilometres (2.15 sq mi), it has got the population density of 4,454 per square kilometre (11,540/sq mi). Due to the connection of Banepa with other places through roadways, about 300 buses, minibuses, cars, trucks, motorcycles altogether are helping in the transportation in a day. Along with this, the gases emitted from those vehicles have polluted the environment of Banepa. Also dust pollution and mishandling of plastic waste have made Banepa highly polluted.

In the boundary of three municipalities of Kavrepalanchowk District, namely; Banepa, Dhulikhel and Panauti, the country's only IT Park is being constructed. All the three cities have been declared as the 'Cyber City'.

== Festivals ==
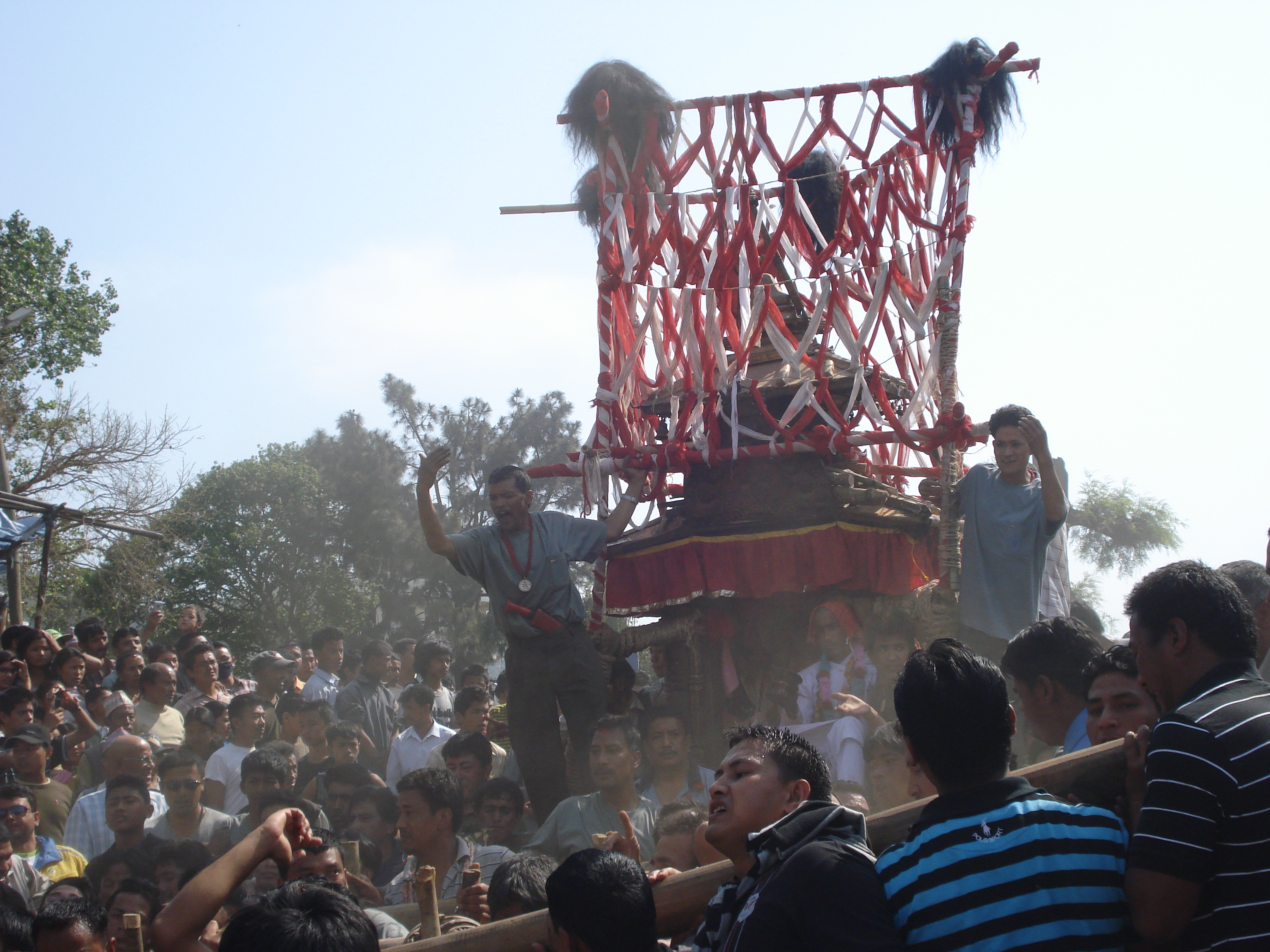
Chandeshwori Jatra

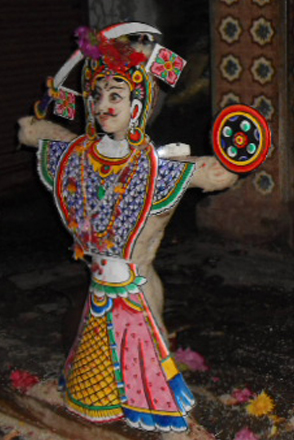
Statue of Jaaludyo of Banepa

Festivals celebrated in Banepa:

1. Chandeshwori Jatra from Baisakh Purnima to next two days.
2. Kanya Puja (worshipping of the young girls) during Gunla, Krishna Janmashtami
3. Navadurga Jatra
4. Tukampo Ganesh Jatra during Vijaya Dashami
5. भीमसेन जात्रा Bhimsen Jatra
6. Jaaludyo Jatra (जालुद्याे जात्रा) on the day of Ashwin Krishna Pratipada, the next day of Indra Jatra.
7. Naradevi Shvetkali Naach (नरदेवी श्वेतकाली नाच, once in twelve years. It was re-continued after about after 38 years.
8. Krishna Janmashtami

=== Forgotten festivals ===
Many other festivals have been discontinued for various reasons. They include:

- Kumari Nritya (कुमारी नृत्य) had been discontinued about 108 years ago.
- Narayan and Bhimsen; Bokakhah Jatra(बाेकखः जात्रा) on Axaya Tritiya (अक्षयतृतीया), Karunamaya Jatra were also had been discontinued about 103 years ago.

== Demographics ==
At the time of the 2021 Nepal census, Banepa Municipality had a population of 67,690. Of these, 58.20% spoke Nepali, 24.52% Newar, 13.35% Tamang, 1.12% Magar and 2.81% other languages as their first language.

Languages In Banepa, 2021
Languages	Percent
Nepali	58.20%
Newari	24.52%
Tamang	13.35%
Magar	1.12%
Others	2.81%

In terms of ethnicity/caste, 28.21% were Newar, 24.19% Hill Brahmin, 20.06% Chhetri, 14.25%Tamang, 2.87% Magar, 1.76% Mijar, 1.40% Pariyar (surname) 1.37% Bishwakarma, 1.17% Gharti/Bhujel 4.72% others.

Ethnicities In Banepa, 2021
Ethnicities	Percent
Newar	28.21%
Hill Brahmin	24.19%
Chhetri	20.06%
Tamang	14.25%
Magar	1.76%
Others	11.53%

In terms of religion, 80.88% were Hindu, 15.43% Buddhist, 2.89% Christian, 0.49% Muslim, 0.1% Irreligion and 0.1% others.

Religion In Banepa, 2021
Religion	Percent
Hinduism	80.88%
Buddhism	15.43%
Christianity	2.89%
Others	1.41%

In terms of literacy, 81.3% could read and write, 1.6% could only read and 17.0% could neither read nor write.

== Economy ==
Banepa is a major trade route to Tibet, with the Arniko Highway, the only highway that connects Nepal and China (Tibet), running through this town. Furthermore, BP Highway also passes through Banepa. Despite being a small town, Banepa is highly developed and serves as the major economic center east of Kathmandu.

== Locations ==
Ward No	Administrative Ward	Population (2021 Census)
1	Tukucha	2,529
2	Tukucha Nala	2,294
3	Thulochaur Nala	3,378
4	Ugrachandi Nala	4,544
5	Kathu Ganesh, Chandeshwori	7,444
6	Budol	7,154
7	Hansharaj Marga	7,755
8	Bholakhatole	6,881
9	Nayabasti	6,057
10	Janagal	7,515
11	Sinagal	2,268
12	Basdol	2,818
13	Bhaisepati	4,285
14	Nasiksthan Sanga	2,768
	TOTAL	67,750

The modern structure of Banepa Municipality was formally established following the implementation of the Constitution of Nepal 2072 (2015), which brought about a significant administrative restructuring across the country. Prior to this transition, the municipality was much smaller, consisting primarily of its historical urban core. This original center is now represented by the current Wards 5, 6, 7, 8, and 9.

To form the current expanded municipality, Seven former Village Development Committees (VDCs) were integrated into the urban fold. These included Tukucha Nala, which now forms Wards 1 and 2, and Ugrachandi Nala & portions of Devitar which constitutes Wards 3 and 4. Portions of the Ravi Opi VDC were merged into Wards 5 and 6, while Ugratara Janagal was reorganized into Wards 10 and 11. The expansion also reached further south and west, incorporating Mahendra Jyoti as Ward 12 and Nasiksthan Sanga as Wards 13 and 14. This consolidation transformed Banepa from a localized trading hub into a larger, more integrated municipal unit.

== Infrastructure and amenities ==
Banepa has a Seventh-day Adventist hospital called Scheer Memorial Hospital, which was established in 1957. This hospital has been expanded as a medical college associated with Vanderbilt University in the US and Kathmandu University. Many students enroll in the B.Sc. Nursing programs at this hospital. Banepa is also the location of the Hospital and Rehabilitation Centre for Disabled Children, Spinal Injury Rehabilitation Centre and Reiyukai Eiko Masunaga Eye Hospital.

Sports facilities include Banepa Polytechnique Football Ground.

To promote local culture, Banepa has two FM radio stations: Radio ABC, which is a Community Radio Station and Prime Fm. This area also has a Television Channel named as Araniko Television.

== Education ==
Banepa is home to multiple educational institutions and teaching hospitals. The National Defence University is the only defence University in whole Nepal.

The Scheer Memorial Hospital offers a Bachelor of Science in Nursing program. The town also houses the Nepal Banepa Polytechnic Institute (NBPI) and the Kavre Deaf School, which is a dedicated school for deaf students.

Banepa boasts two public multi-campus institutions affiliated with Tribhuvan University. Additionally, there are around 40 schools in the area, with 25 being privately owned and 15 being public schools. Some of the prestigious schools in Banepa include, Banepa NIST School, Baylor International Academy, and Vidhya Sagar Secondary School.

== Tourist attractions ==
- Chandeshwori Temple
- Banepa Nagi Dada : From where you can see the clear view of Dhulikhel, Sanga, Banepa, Panauti, With the mountains, small and big rivers and many more
- Nagarkot
- Banepa/Nala Gadhi
- Gosaithan
- Nala Gumba
- Nala Bhagawati
- Dhaneshwor Temple
- Janti Dhunga

== Gallery ==
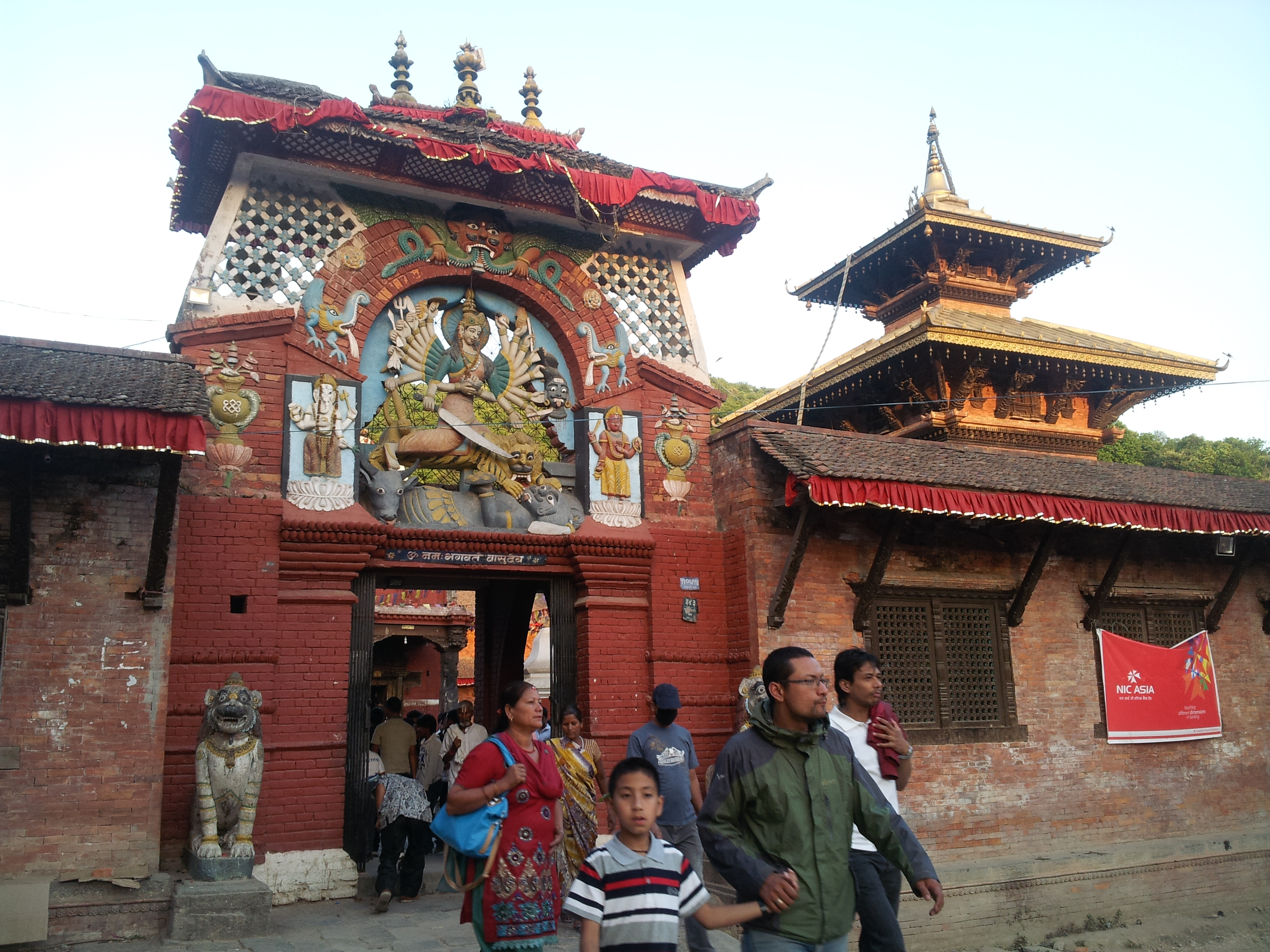
Entrance Gate of Chandeshwori Temple

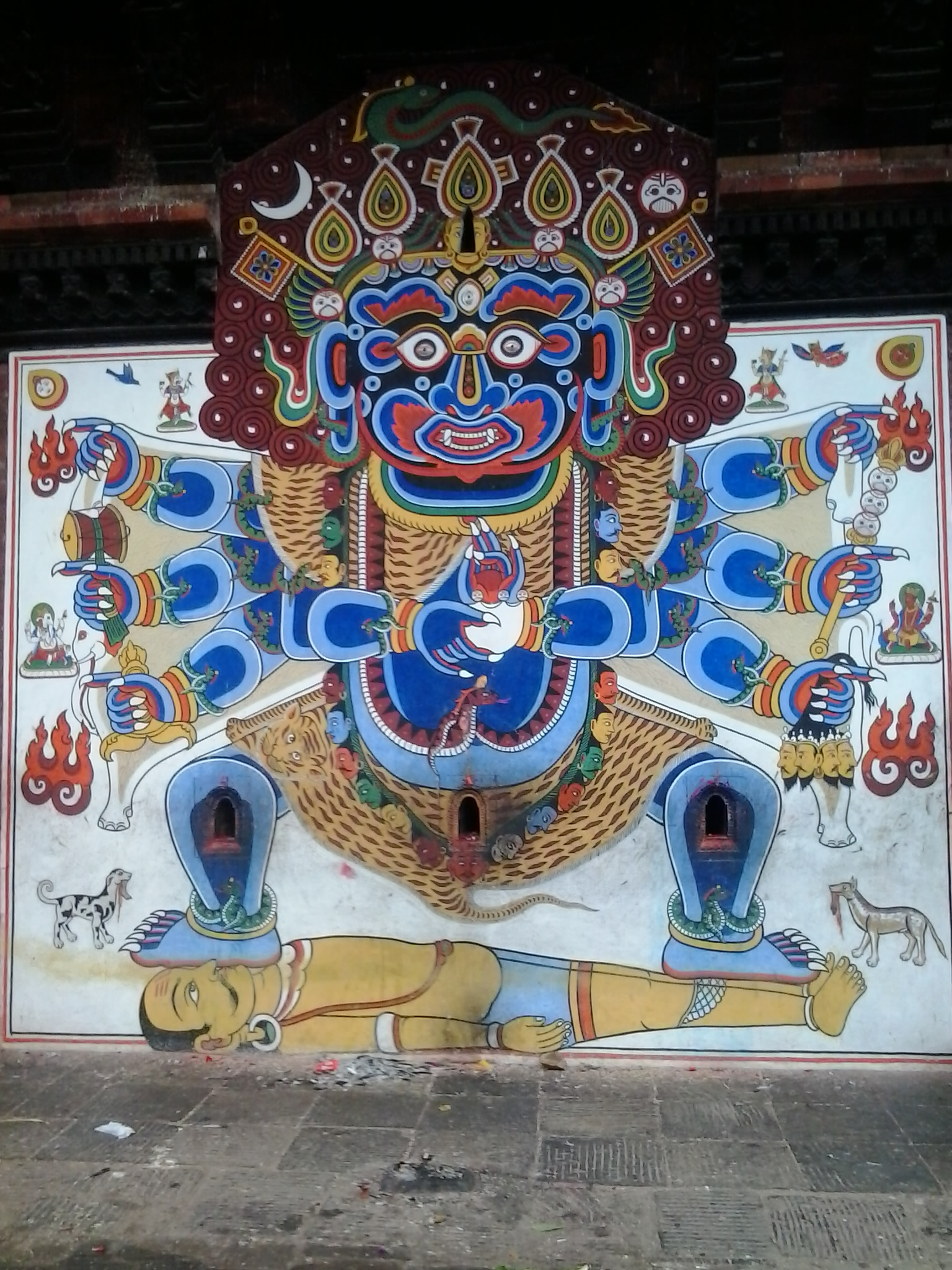
Bhairab painting of Chandeswori temple, one of the major attraction of Banepa

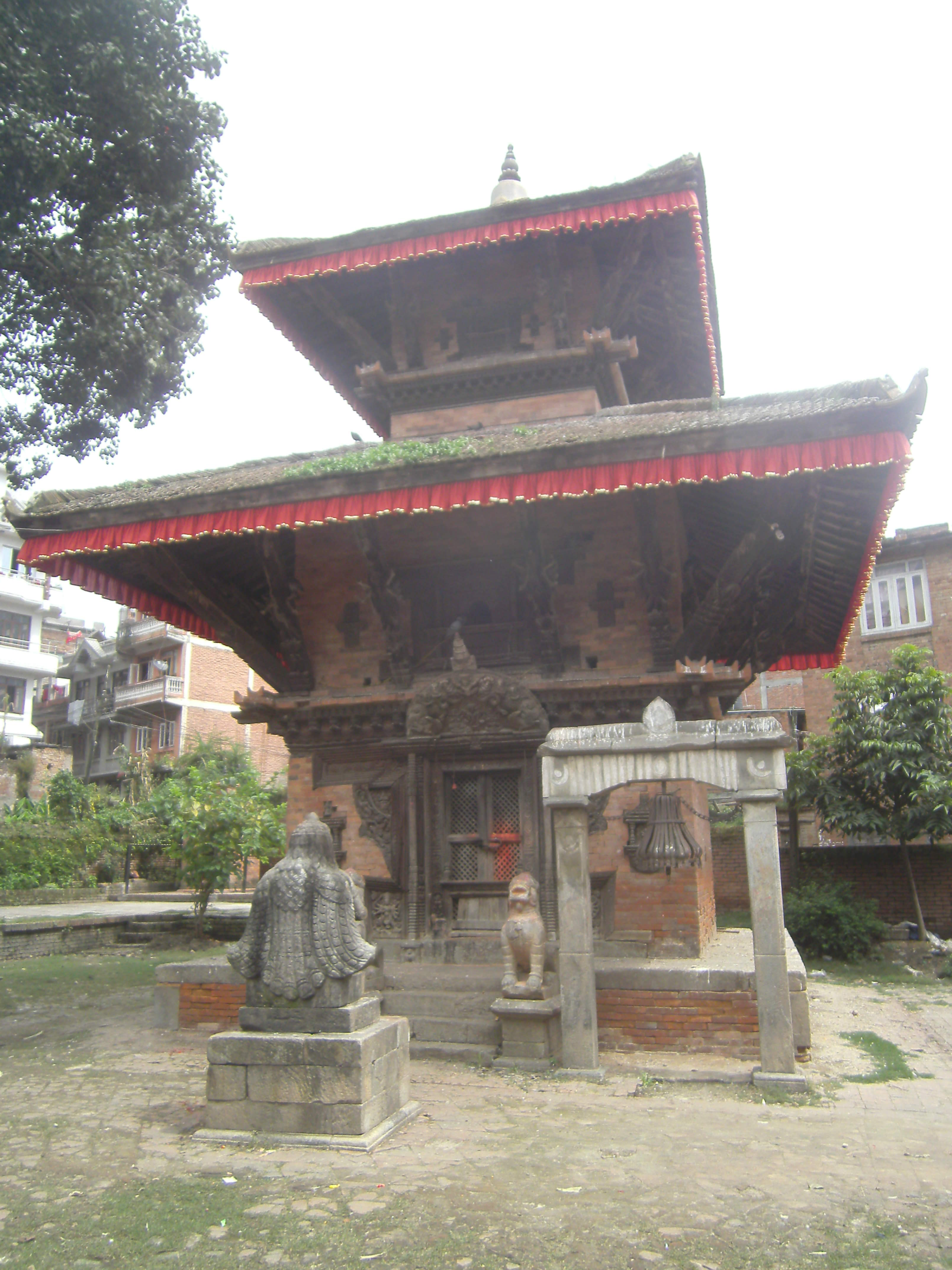
Narayanthan of Banepa, believed to be established during the reign of King Ranajit Malla

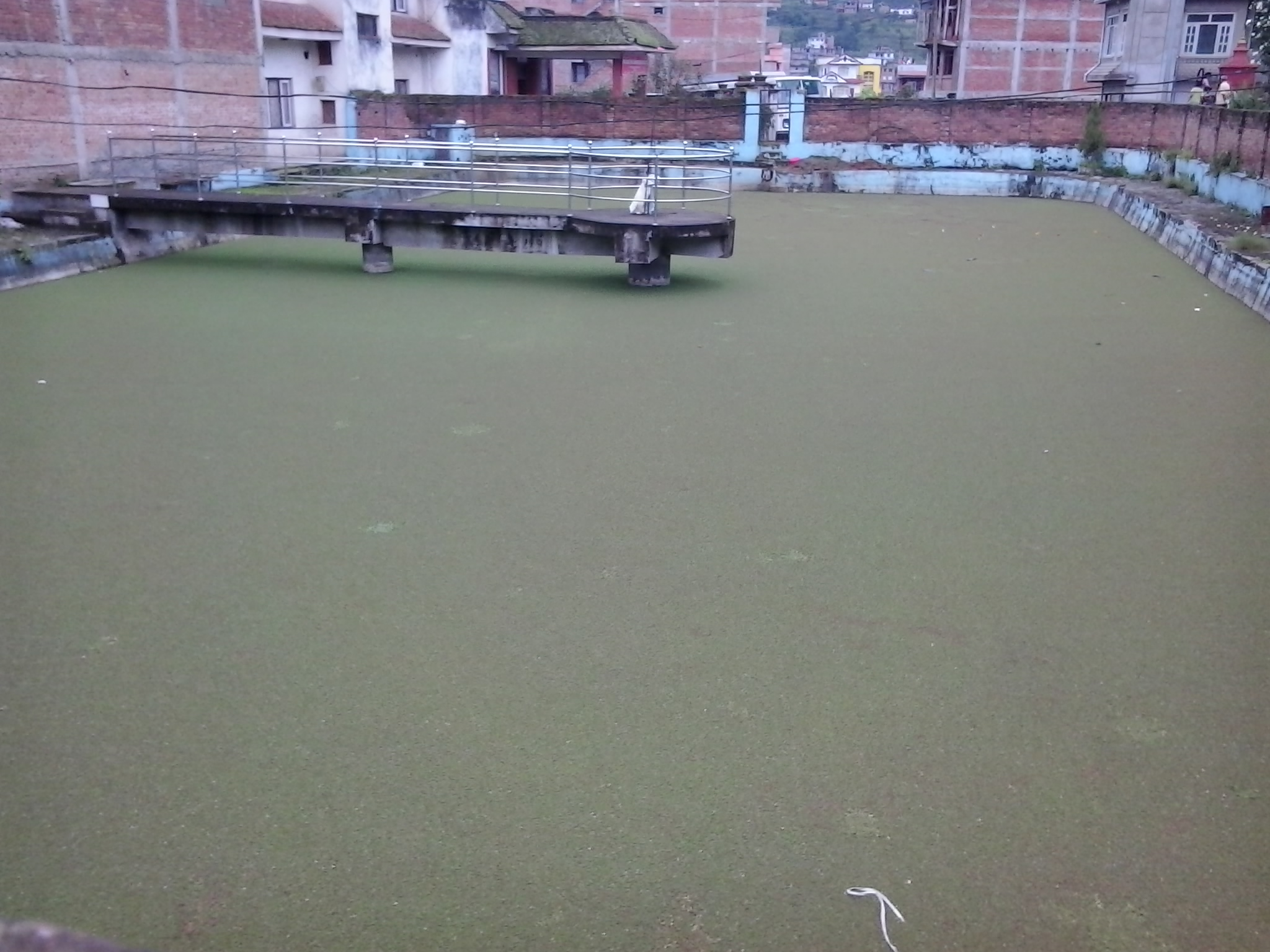
Pond of Talapukhu Ganesh Temple

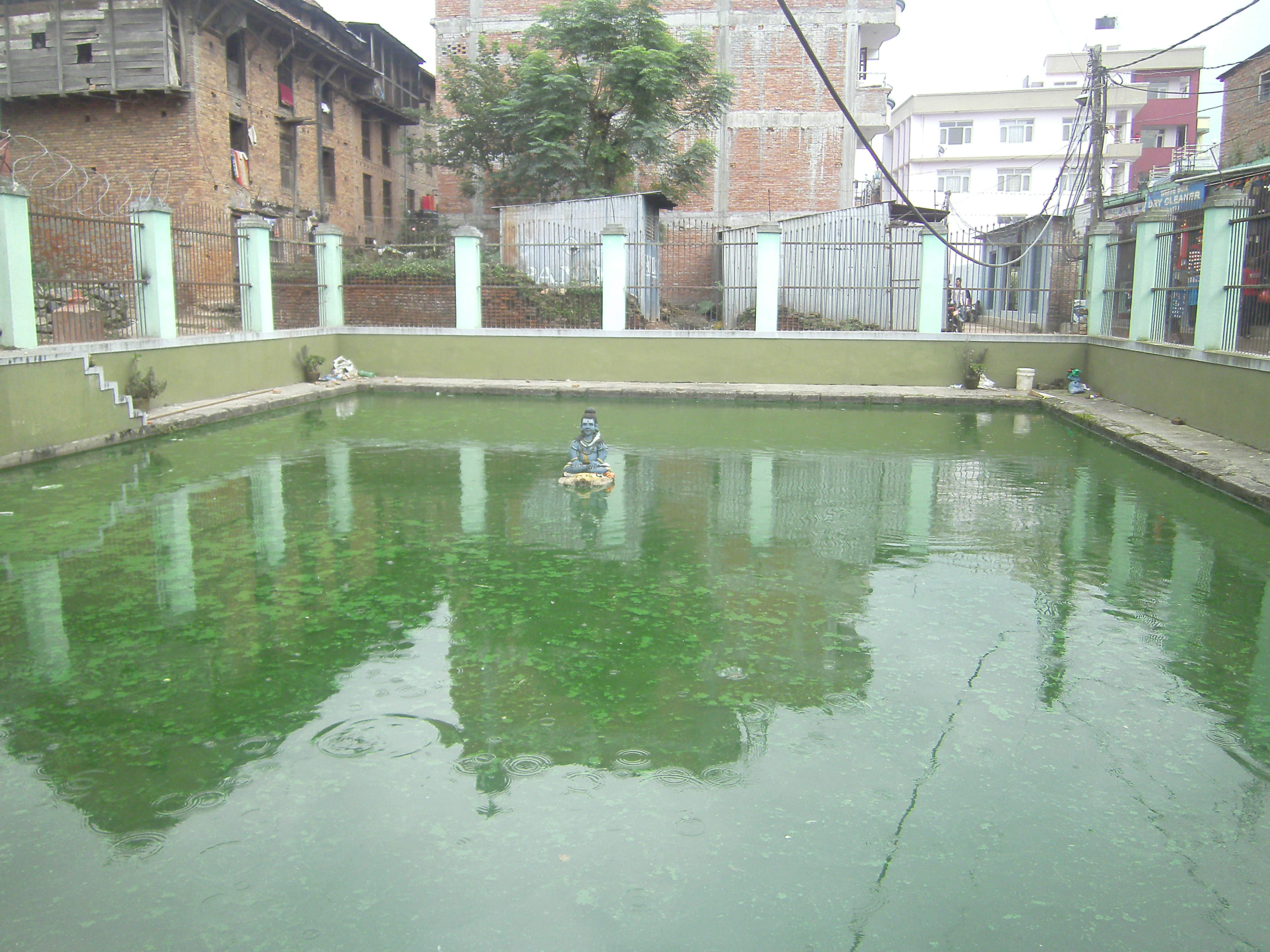
Pond of Kobha Ganesh Temple

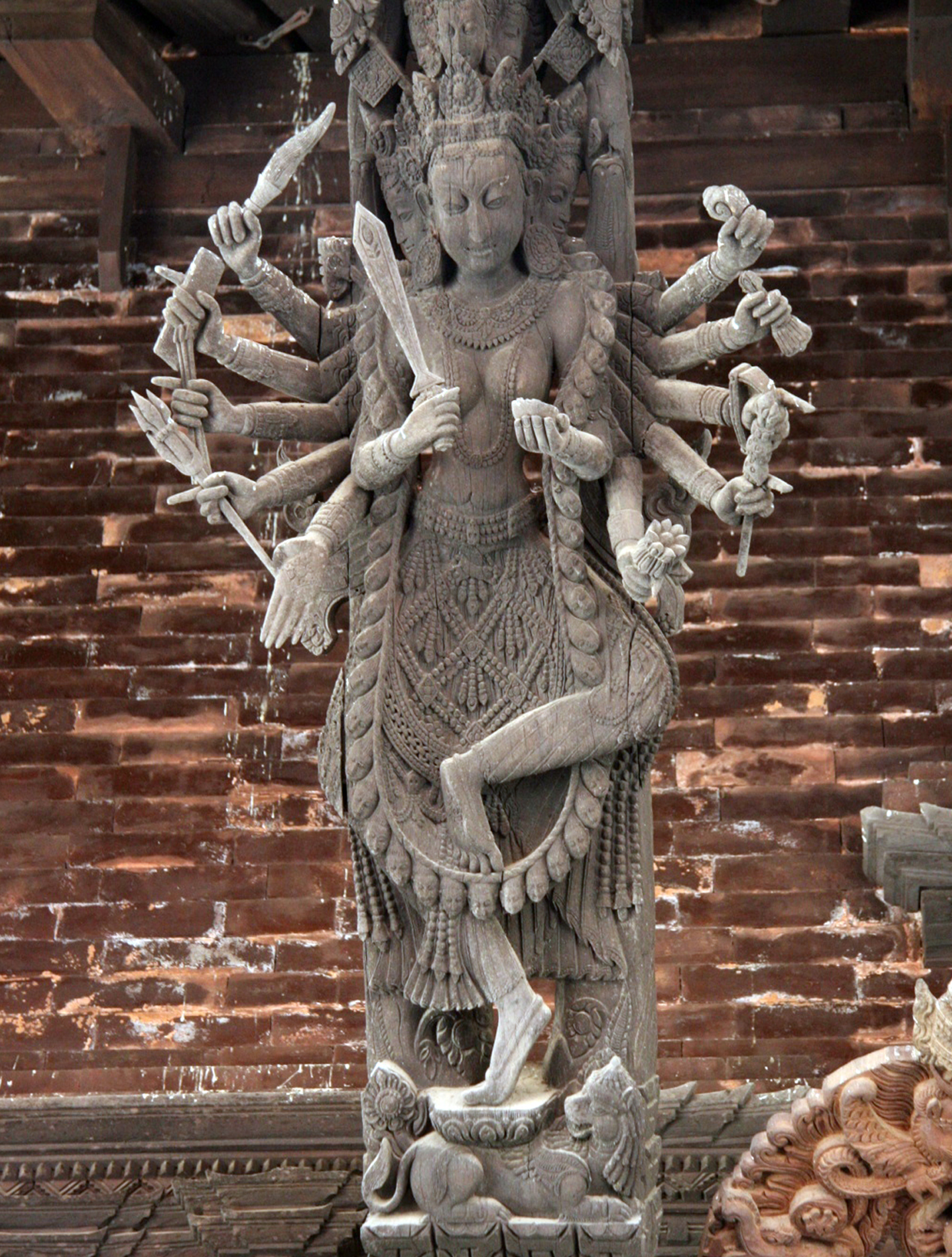
Wood carved roof decoration on the Chandeshwari Temple.

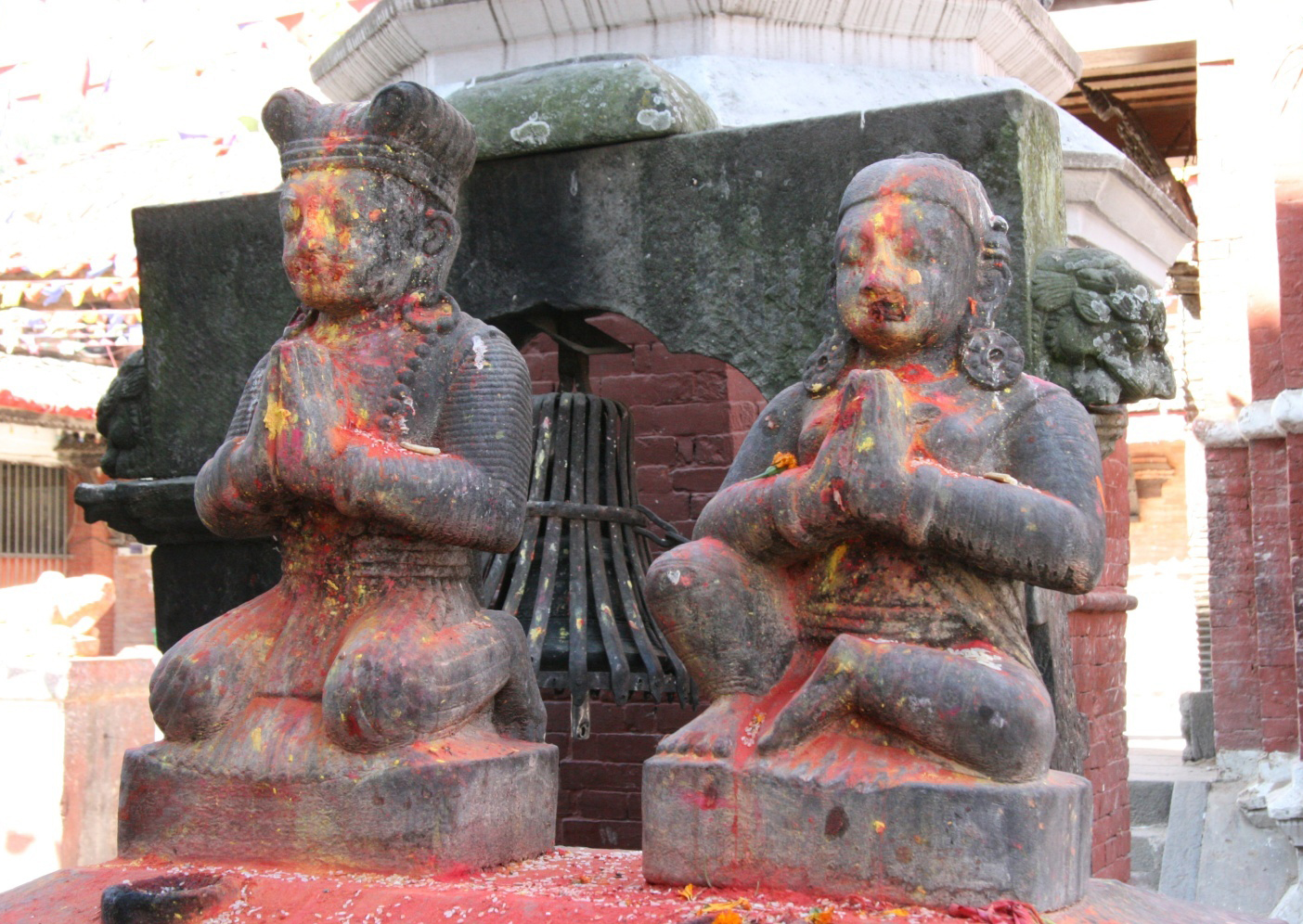
Malla king and queen doing Namaste (the ritual greeting) in front of the Chandeshwari Temple.

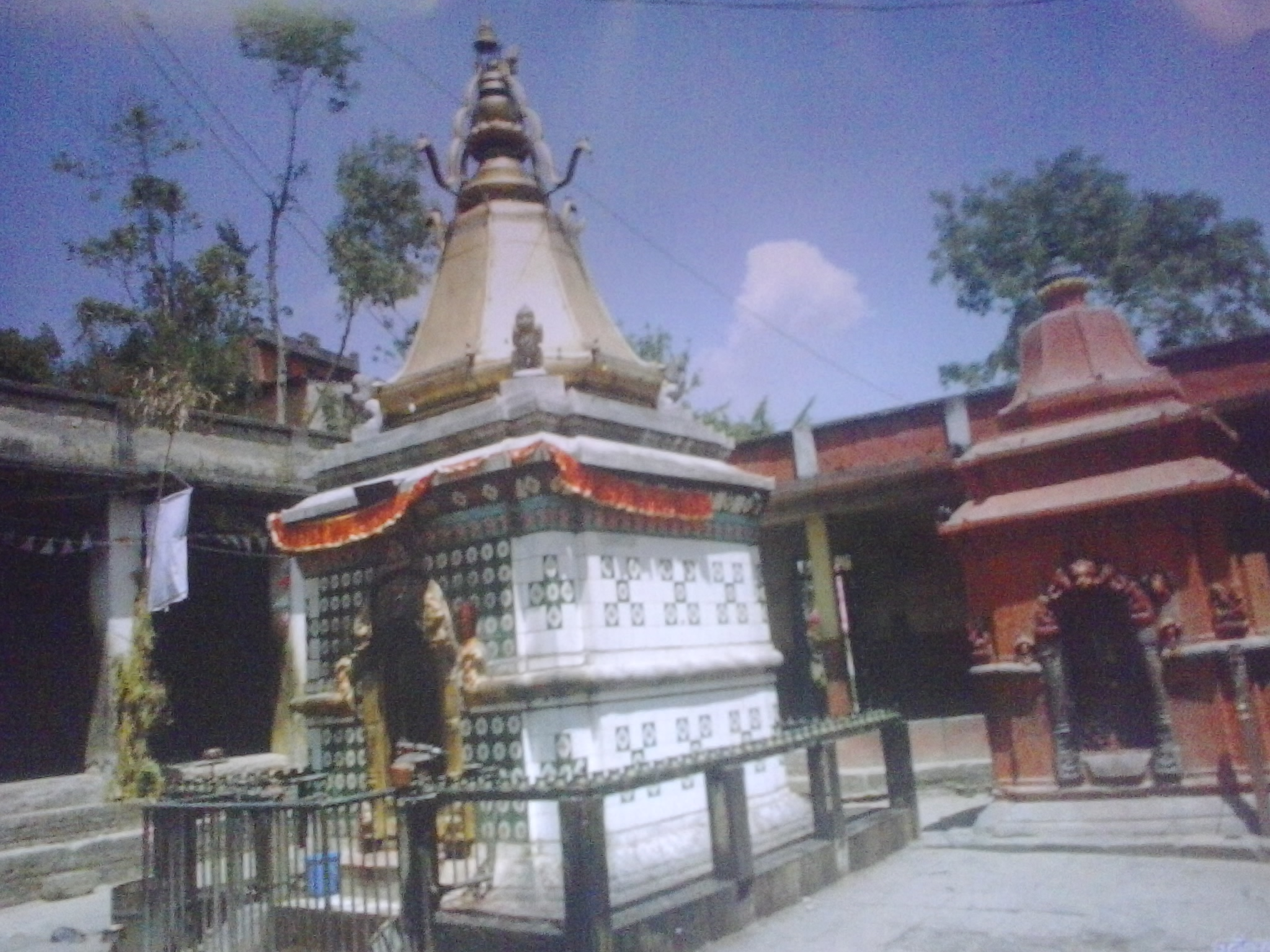
Dhaneshwor Temple

== Notable people ==
- Hari Bansha Acharya Actor
- Ranjan Sapkota Vlogger, Entrepreneur
- Ram Bahadur Khatri Producer, Director and Actor
- Daya Ram Dahal Director
- Ravindra Khadka Actor
- Shweta Khadka Nepalese film actress, producer, politician and entrepreneur
- Mukunda Thapa Actor
- Shiva Prasad Humagain Politician

== International relations and organizations ==
=== Twin towns – sister cities ===
Banepa is twinned with:

- Shigatse, China
