= Nala, Nepal =

Coordinates: 27°39′N 85°31′E

Nala, Nepal नाला
- Location in Nepal
- Country: Nepal
- Zone: Bagmati Zone
- District: Kavrepalanchowk District

Population (1991)
  - Total: 6,327
- Time zone: UTC+5:45 (Nepal Time)

Nala (Nepali: नाला) is a region that expands from north western part of Kavrepalanchowk District to the eastern part of Bhaktapur District in the Bagmati Zone of central Nepal. At the time of the 1991 Nepal census, it had a population of 6327 in 1035 individual households.

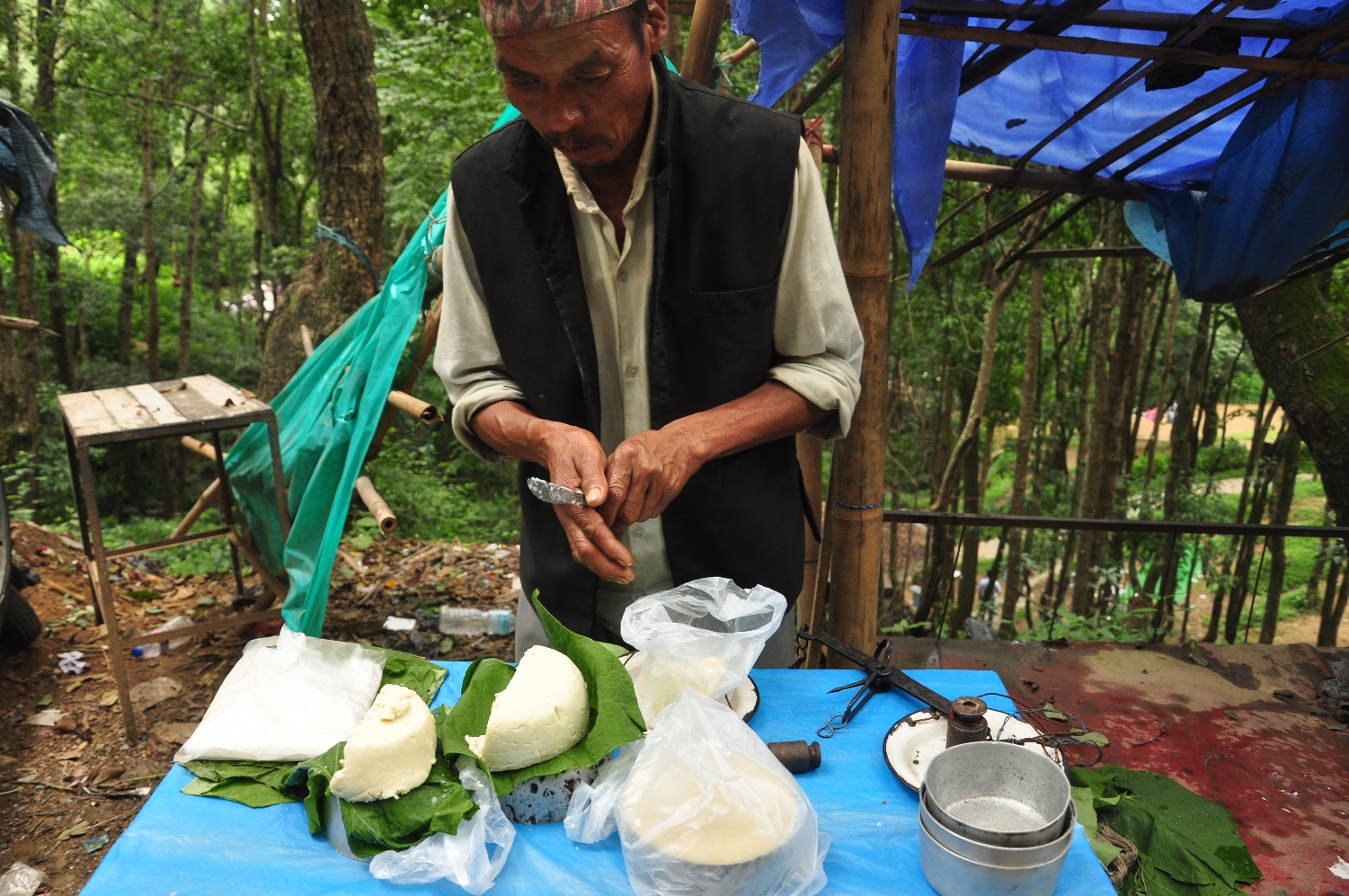
Street vendor selling khuwa in Nepal

The area has some small towns and some villages in the hills. Khuwa is a product made from evaporated milk that is a specialty of the area. This region is one of the biggest supplier of green vegetables and potato to the capital city, Kathmandu.

Nala is a historical and religious place of Nepal. It is a common religious place for Hindus and Buddhists. It is famous for Seto Machhindraanath (Karuna Mai), Bhagwati Temple, Manakamana Temple, Siddhartha Gumba and Ugrachandi Temple which is unique in having four storeys in the pagoda style.

Nala expands as Ugrachandi Nala, Tukucha Nala, Tathali, Nayagau and Debitar village development committee. Main trade centers of this region are Nala Bazaar and Sera. There is a palace that now houses Chandeswory School. Siddhartha University lies in this area which is under construction.
