= HRDC (disambiguation) =

HRDC may be:

- Harvard Radcliffe Dramatic Club, Harvard University
- Hospital and Rehabilitation Centre for Disabled Children, Nepal
- Human Resources Development Canada
- Human Resource Development Council, Montana
- Human Rights Defense Center, publisher of Prison Legal News
- Human Rights Documentation Centre, India
