= Aangal =

Place in Nepal

Aangal is a small village located in Ugrachandi Nala VDC of Kavrepalanchok District of Nepal, with approximately 300–400 inhabitants. Brahmin, Chhetri and Newar castes live in the village.It is 5 km (3.1 mi) from Banepa. Guptabalmikeshwor Mahadev temple lies in this place which is famous in the whole VDC.
