= Chandeshwori Temple =

Hindu goddess

Chandeshwari Temple
- चण्डेश्वरी मन्दिर
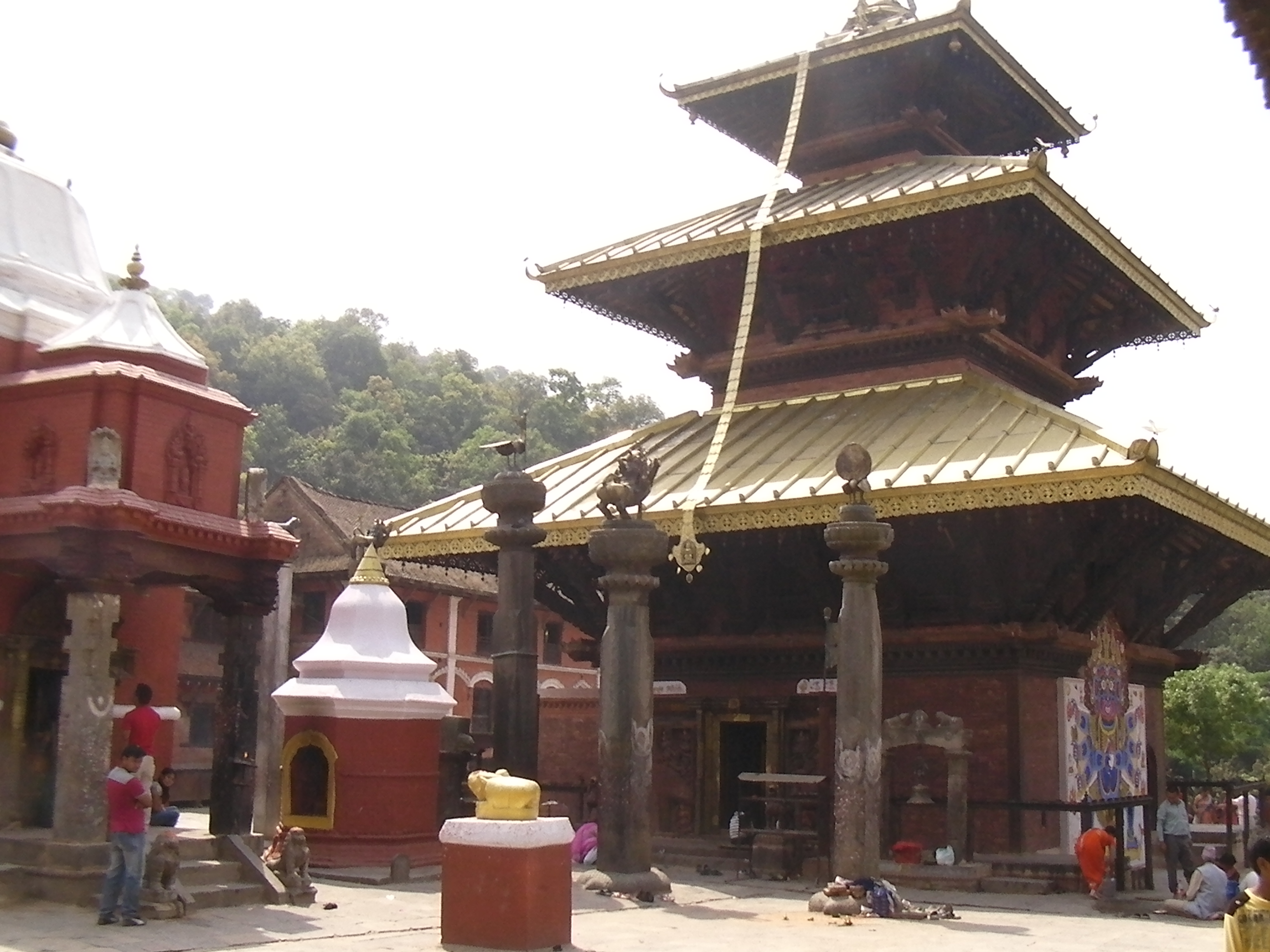
- A view of Chandeshwari Temple

- Location in Nepal

Religion
- Affiliation: Hinduism
- District: Kavrepalanchowk
- Deity: Durga
- Festivals: Chandeshwori Jatra, Shivaratri, Teej, Balachaturdasi

Location
- Location: Banepa
- Country: Nepal
- Interactive map of Chandeshwari Temple
- Coordinates: 27°38′09″N 85°31′56″E

Architecture
- Type: Pagoda

Chandeshwari is the avatar taken by Hindu goddess Kumari of Hindu. The 'Nepal Mahatmya' of Skanda Purana mentions the story related to goddess Chandeshwari.

== Chandeshwori temple ==
Along Arniko Highway 5 kilometers before Dhulikhel is the town of Banepa, Nepal. One of the attractions of Banepa is the temple of Chandeshwori, located approximately 1 kilometer northeast of the town along the Punya mata River next to Ghokechaur having a length of 0.21 kilometres.

It is believed to have been built in the 17th century. The temple features a mural of Chandeshwori slaying the demon Chanda. The temple also consists of the painting of lord Bhairava on one of its wall which is the biggest graffiti of the Nepal Mandala.

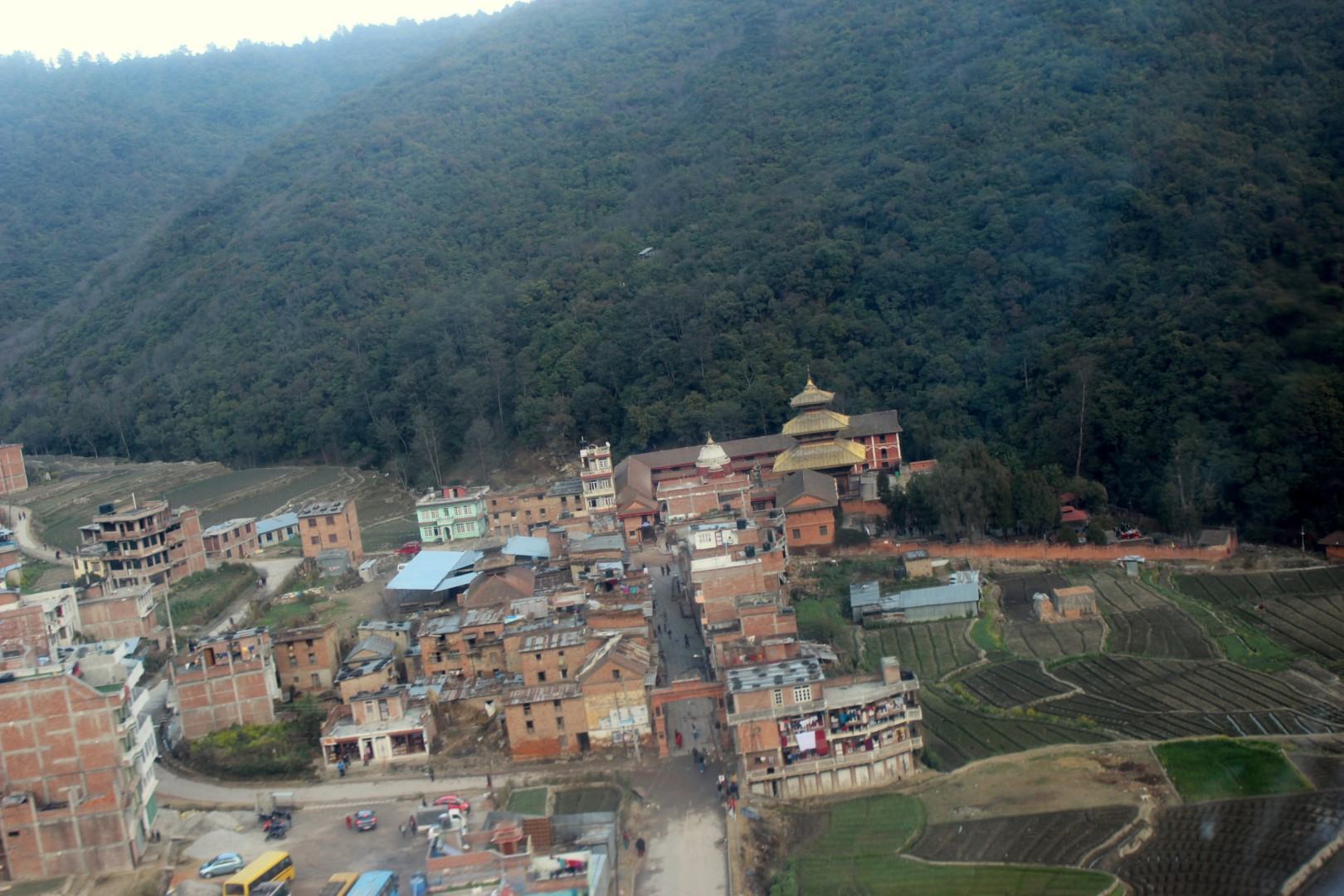
Aerial view of the temple

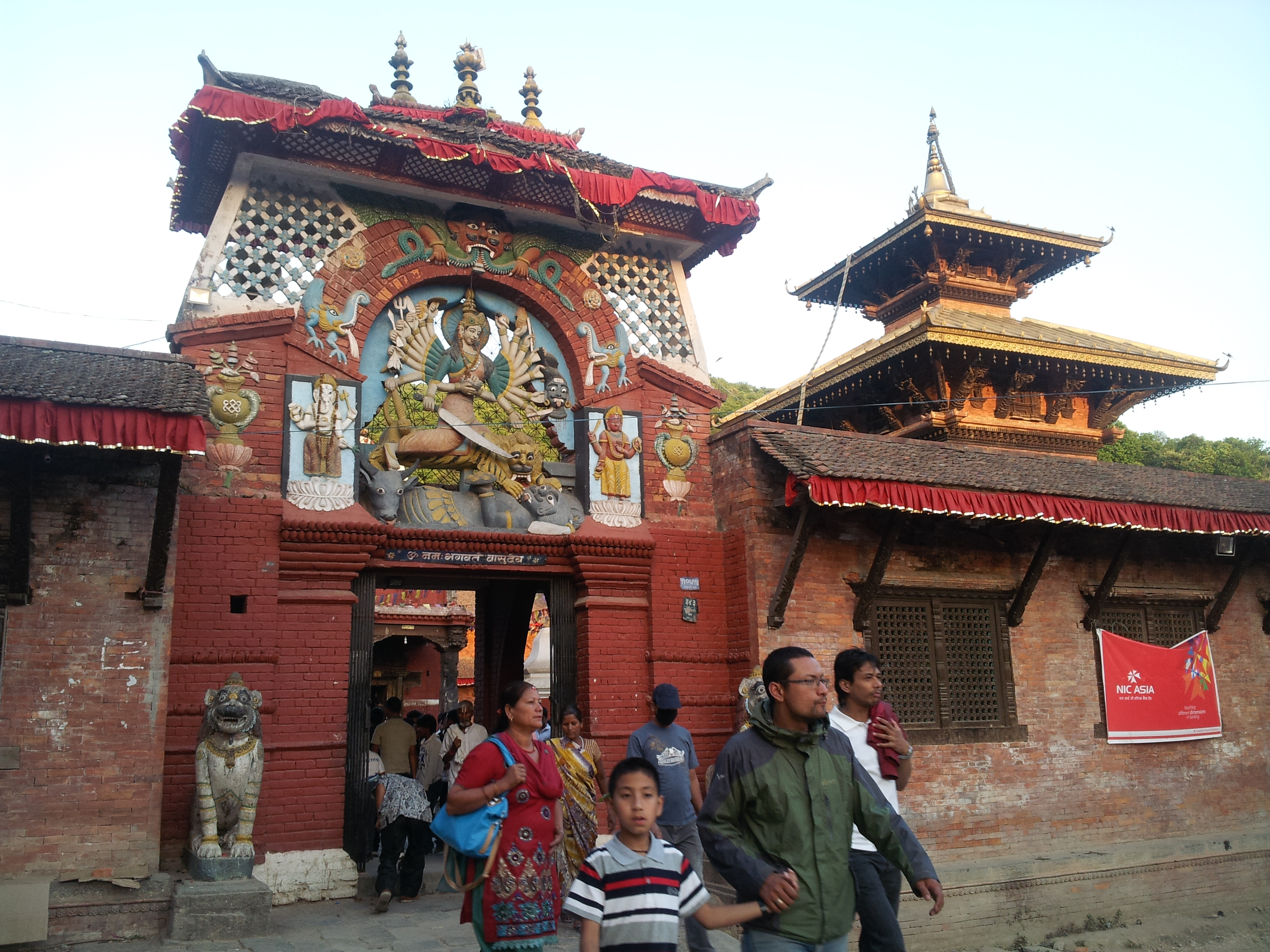
Temple entry gate

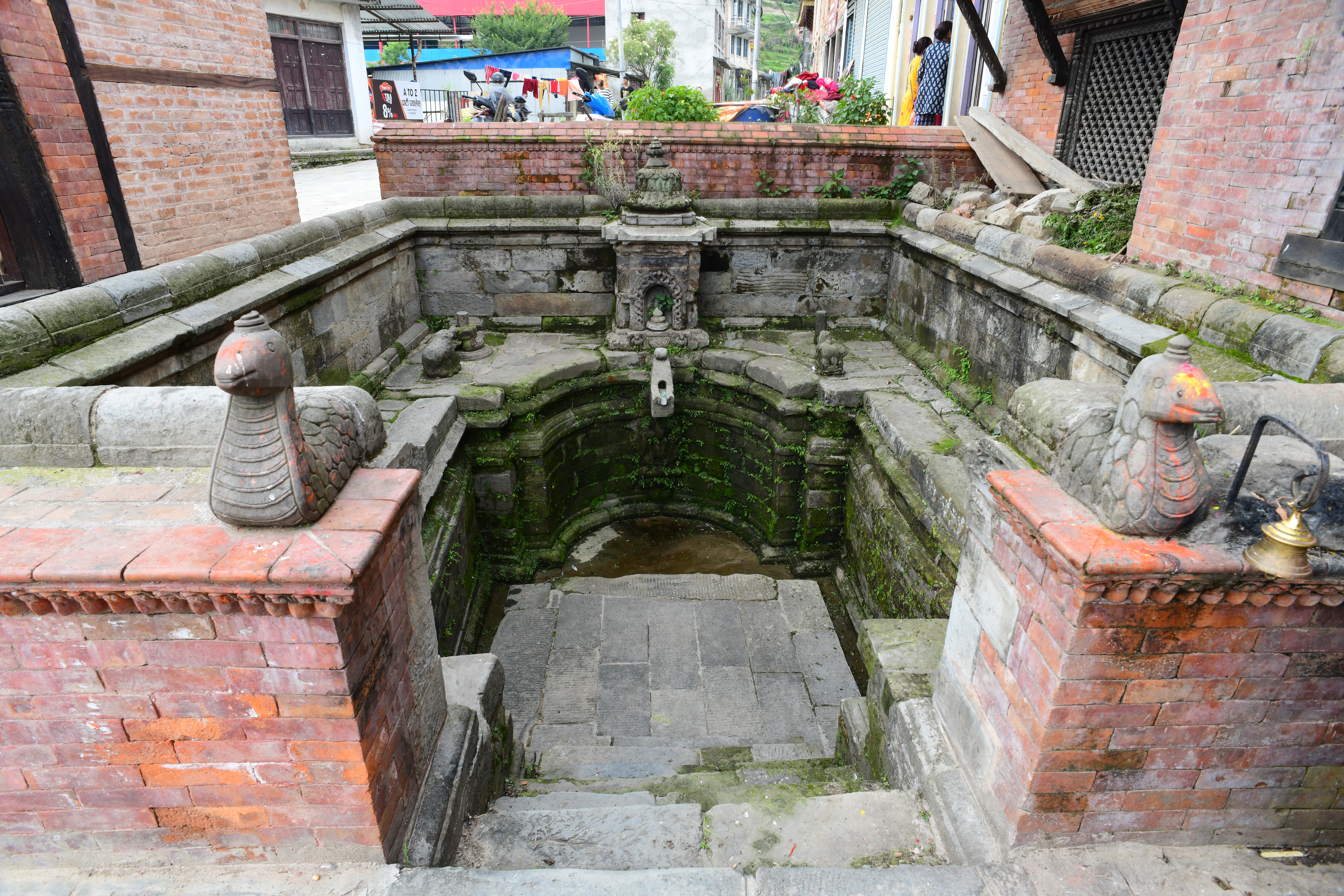
Dhunge dhara next to the entrance

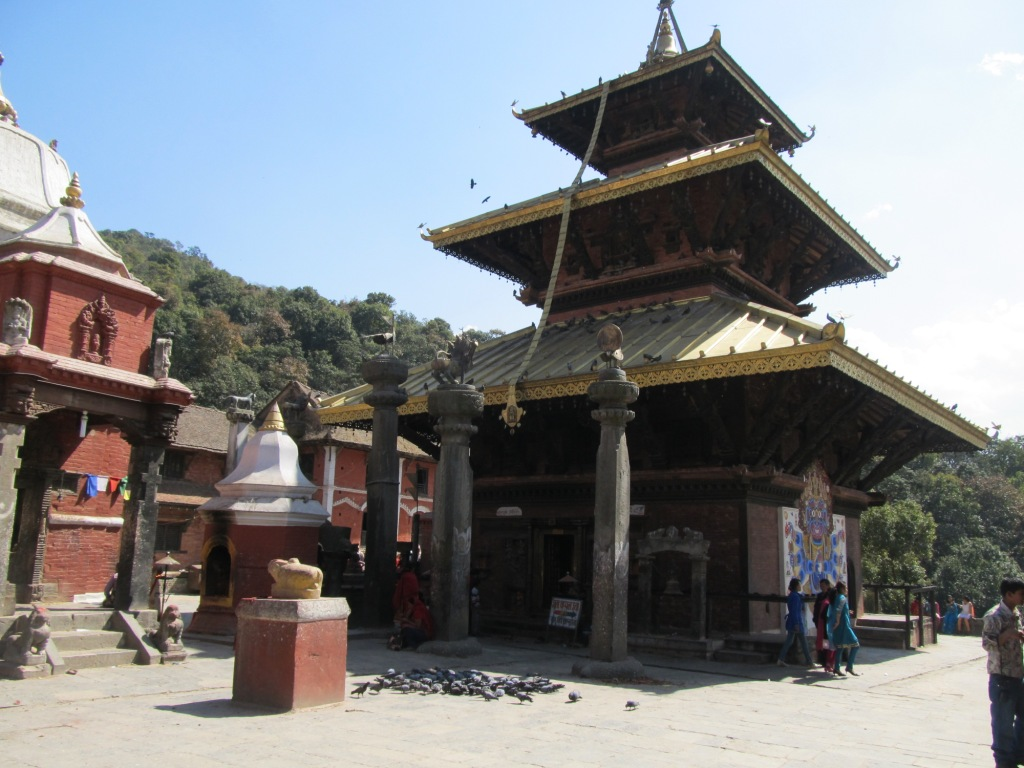
Chandeshwari Temple

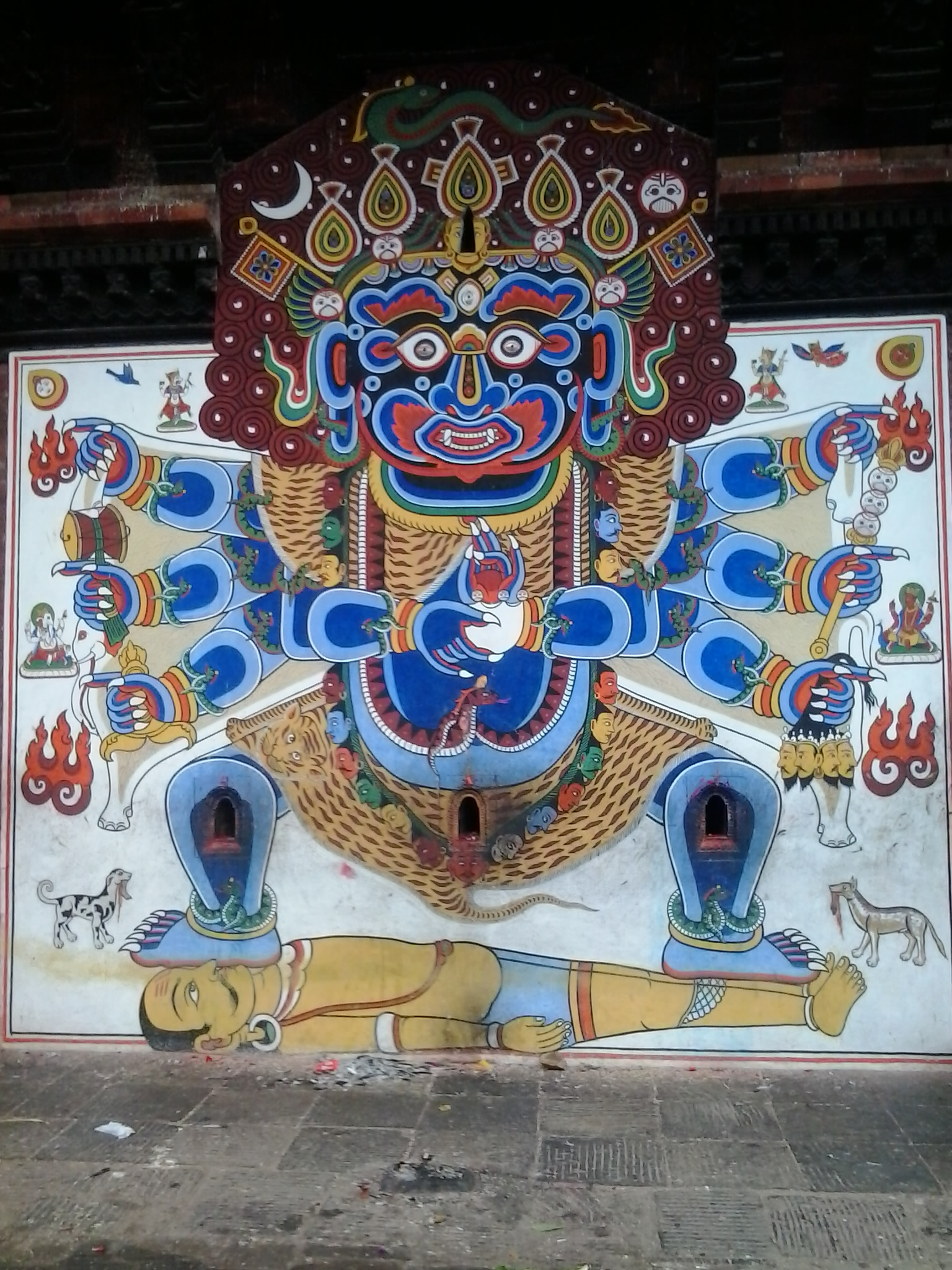
Wall painting of Bhairab at Chandeswori

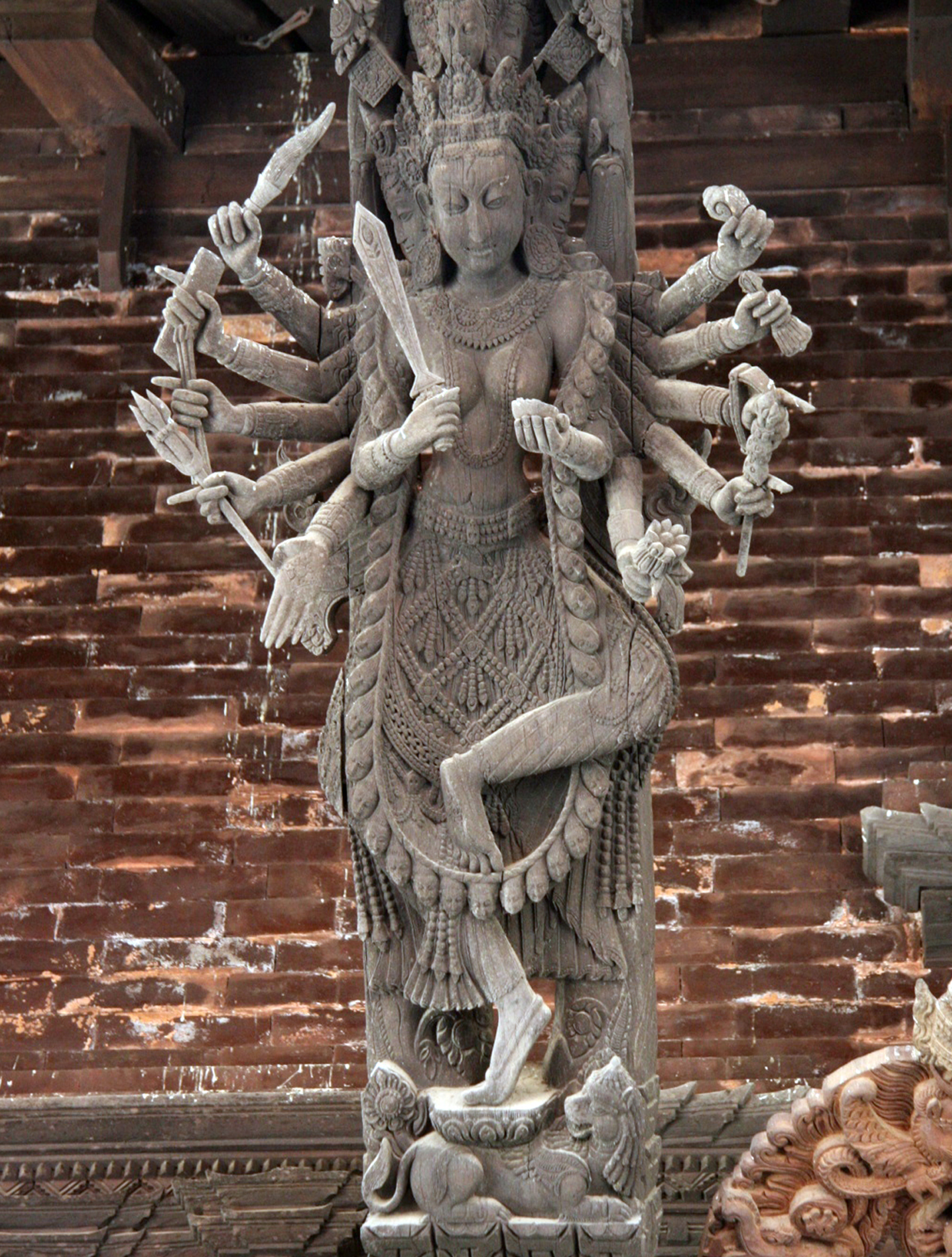
Wood carved roof decoration

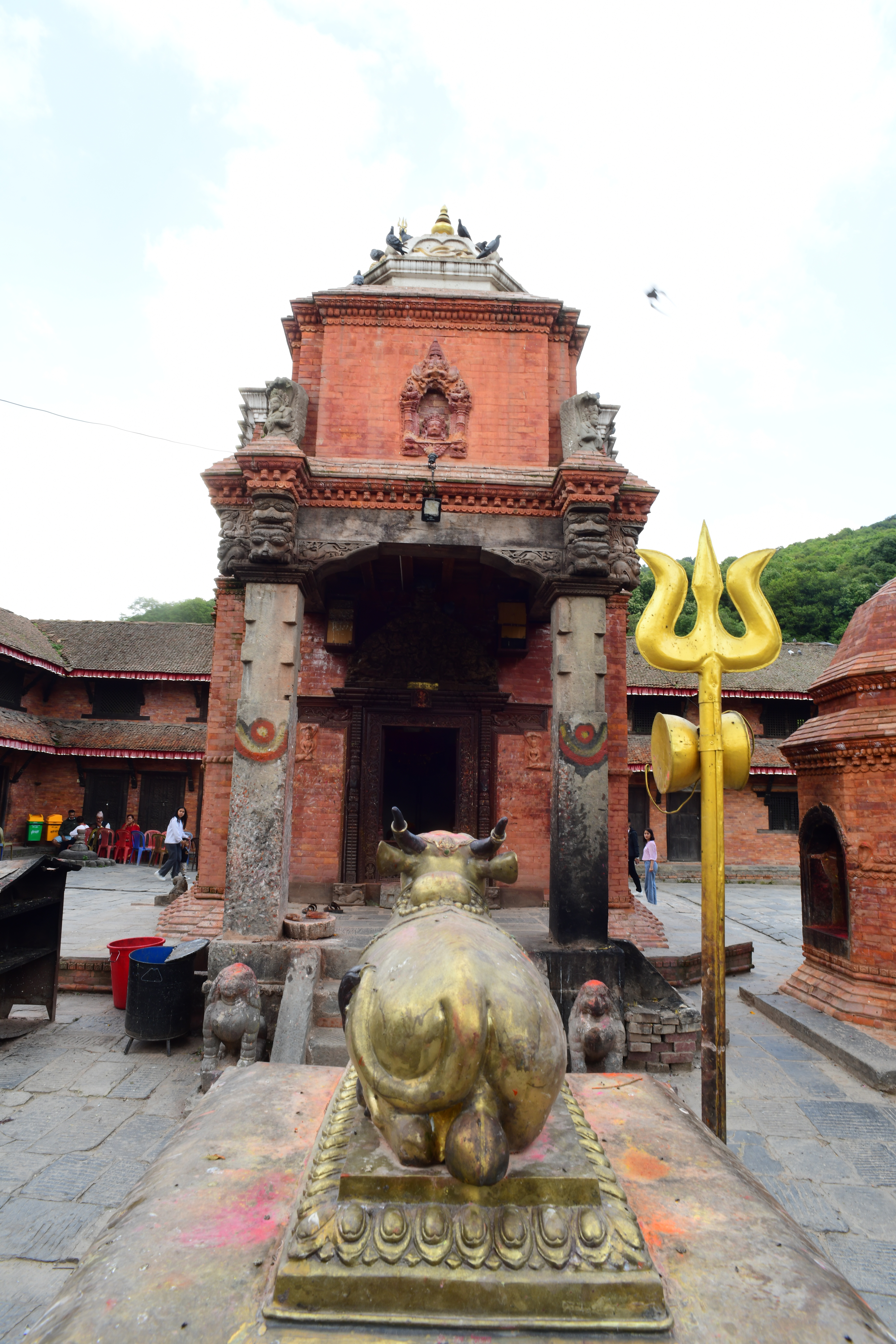
Chandeshwor Mahadev Temple

=== Myth ===
There is myth that the Chandeshwori temple is the place where the mother goddess (Sati / Parvati and in Banepa known as Chandeshwori) defeated the demon Chanda. The demon was a plague to the world since Shiva gave him a boon that made him unbeatable except by women. The desperate gods asked Brahma for advice and he sent them to the forest around Banepa where the mother gods lived in those days. In the meantime, Narada went to Chanda and provoked him to come to Banepa to fight the gods. When Chanda arrived with a big army of demons, all the gods took the forms of different birds and flew. The mother goddess quickly disappeared in a tree but Chanda saw that and cut down the tree with his sword. Now the goddess appeared on a big lion and a terrible fight between her and Chanda started. But Chanda had no chance and was killed by the mother goddess. Out of the belly of Chanda who was a big devotee of Shiva a lingam grew. This lingam can be seen in the small temple just in front of the big temple in the Chandeshwori temple complex. It is said that down at the big rocks around the river you can still see the marks of the big fight between the goddess and the demon.
