= Dhaneshwor Temple =

Hindu temple in Nepal

- धनेश्वर
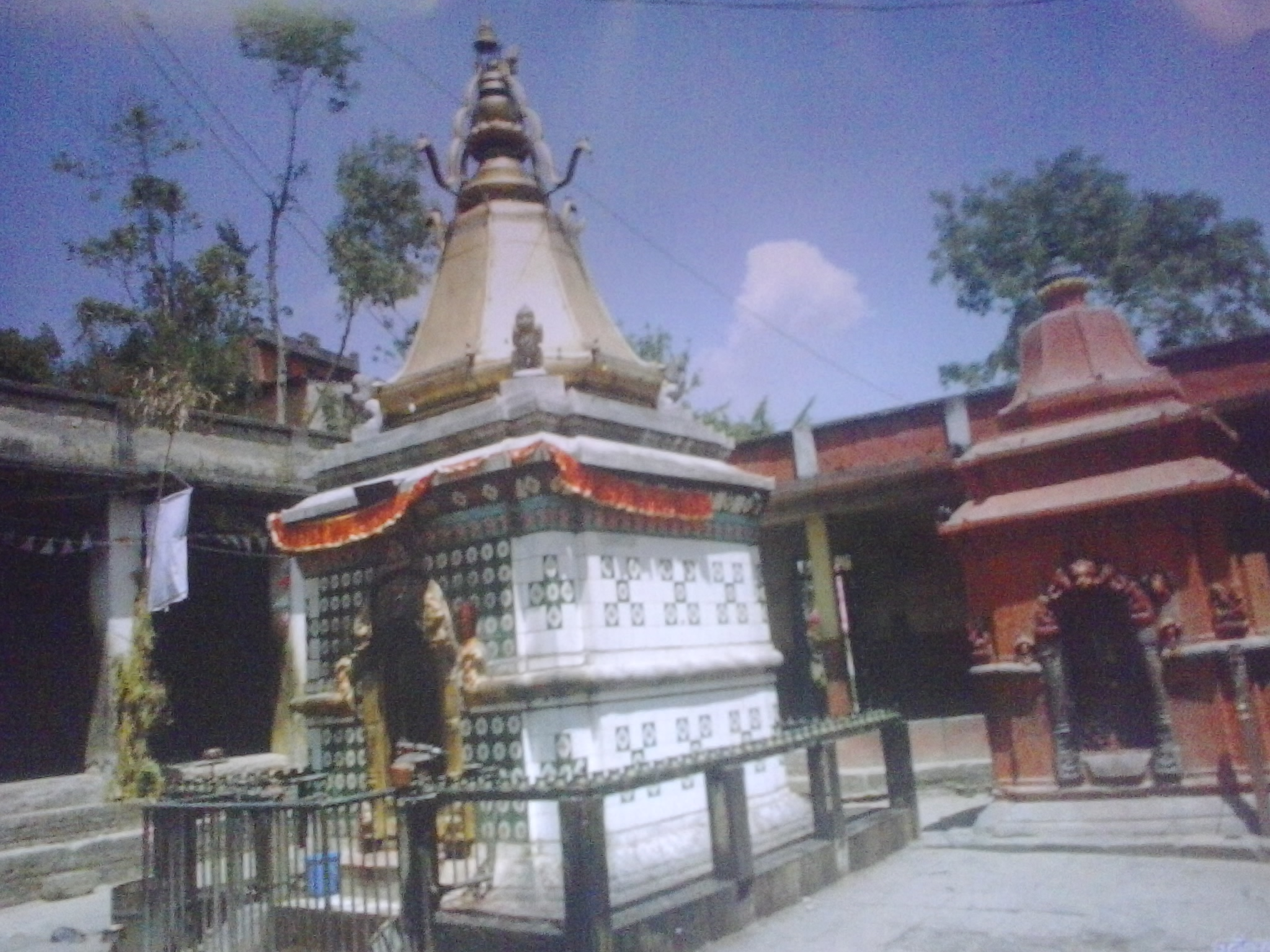

- Location in Bagmati Province Dhaneshwor Temple (Nepal)

Religion
- Affiliation: Hinduism
- District: Kavrepalanchowk
- Deity: Shiva
- Festivals: Shivaratri, Teej

Location
- Location: Banepa
- State: Bagmati Province
- Country: Nepal
- Interactive map of Dhaneshwor Temple
- Coordinates: 27°37′47″N 85°31′17″E

Architecture
- Temple: 1

Dhaneshwor Temple (Nepali: धनेश्वर मन्दिर) is located between the Banepa and Panauti. It lies in the 1 km south of the Banepa Bazaar.This is a temple of Shiva.

== History ==
According to the Hindu puran, the poor Vaisya named Shiva Das who suffered from his wealthy relatives became a hermit. On the advice of a sage named Ritu he prayed to the Dhaneshwor, who in return for his devotion granted him a lot of property. As a symbol of gratitude he established this temple. It is also believed that the right ear of Sati Devi fell when Lord Shiva wandered carrying her dead body in grief. The temple is a multi roofed structure and the main shrine is the Panchamukhi Shivalinga, one of the most famous Shiva Lingas in Nepal. There are also idols of Bhairav, Narayan, Laxminarayan, Hanuman, Mahankal, Umamaheshwor and Nandi. The temple is mostly crowded with devotees during the festivals of Dhanya Purnima, Shivaratri and Bala Chaturdashi.
