= National School of Sciences, Lainchour =

National School of Sciences
- Other names: NSS, NIST
- Established: 1993
- Chancellor: Madhav Prasad Baral
- Faculty: Science, Management
- Location: Lainchour, Kathmandu, Kathmandu, Nepal; 27.718051°N 85.314051°E
- Website: nss.edu.np

The National School of Sciences (NSS) formerly known as the National Institute of Science and Technology (NIST), was established in 1993. It is located in Lainchour, Kathmandu, Nepal. The patron of the institute is Madhav Prasad Baral, who is also the academic incharge and similarly vice principal is Pranita Sharma Baral. The school offers science and management courses, primarily focusing on science. The institute is a part of a larger NIST Foundation which has multiple other branches which offer education from the secondary level up to the graduate levels.

The National school of science (NSS) is a premier education institute managed by the NIST foundation that was established three decades ago. The core objective of the foundation, as an apex body, have been to establish education institutions, and provide students academic programmes from pre-school to high-school to university." Institute is open Sunday to Friday 5AM-5PM. Classrooms are spaciously designed to accommodate thirty-six students. Student furniture is chosen so as to provide the necessary comfort and support for proper seating posture taking into account the long hours students put in inside the classroom. Each classroom is equipped with a fixed projector and access to high internet connectivity to ensure the use of tech in learning. Student and teacher get 1 hour of lunch break per day and 15 mins rest break after every 2 classes. The school has provision of canteen for students and they can bring their lunch if they want. Canteen serves freshly prepared and well-balanced diet of veg and non-veg dishes.

Applicants must pass the Entrance examination in a related course to enroll at NIST. Institute has a prescribed set of school uniform which all students must adhere to. Uniform includes shirt, pant, tie, coat and black shoe. Students are also provided with house t-shirt for the ECAs and a sweater for winter. The school provides transportation facilities to students who require bus service to commute to and from the school. Application for the bus service have to be made at the time of admissions and is only available within the periphery of 10 km.

== Programs ==
Besides +2 in Science and Management program, this college also provides bachelor's degree in microbiology, Bio-chemistry, Food Technology, Pharmacy, Business studies and CSIT. This school also provides master's degree in Microbiology and Bio-technology, and diploma degree in pharmacy and Lab Technician. Among above courses, Bio Chemistry in Bachelor level is affiliated to Purbanchal University. Three years diploma course is affiliated to CTEVT and all the other courses are affiliated to Tribhuvan University of Bachelor and Master Level.

== Scholarships ==
1. Board topper, district topper and entrance topper are provided with full scholarship.
2. Entrance exam topper within top 5 ranks get full scholarship, 6-10 ranked student get 80% scholarship and 11-19 students gets scholarship as per rank order in science stream for plus two.
3. NIST genius students who are able to secured top 10 ranks within internal exams are awarded with 3 month tuition fee amount.
4. Recommended students by HSEB will also be awarded by scholarship.

== Facilities ==
- Science and Computer labs.
- Library with all the related books available.
- Basketball court, table tennis board, badminton court and football pitch.
- College tours, annual programs, and industrial visits are conducted.
- Internal assessments, seminars, guest lectures and presentations are conducted regularly.
- Extra tuition is provided to students with need.
- Extra curriculum activities in sports and cultural programs are held throughout the year.
- Hostel for both boys and girls are located in 1 km from the school.

== NIST network institutions ==
- National Institute of Sciences (Lalitpur-NIST) - Gwarko, Lalitpur: Situated at Gwarko-7, Lalitpur, Lalitpur NIST conducts grade 11 and 12 NEB curriculum of Science, Management and Law faculty, Lalitpur NIST also conducts bachelor programs Bachelor of Computer Application (BCA) and, Bachelor of Business Studies (BBS) under Tribhuvan University
- Banepa NIST School and NIST College - Banepa, Kavre: Situated at Banepa-9, Kavre, Banepa NIST Secondary School conducts grade 11 and 12 NEB curriculum of Science and Management faculty, while NIST College conducts bachelors programs of Bachelor of Science in Computer Science and IT (BSc CSIT), BCA, and Bachelor of Information Technology Management (BITM) affiliated to Tribhuvan University.
- Bhaktapur NIST School - Lokanthali, Bhaktapur: Situated at Lokanthali, Bhaktapur NIST School provides learning community for young people of preschool to grade 12. For 11 and 12, Science and Law faculties are conducted.

== Chairman Madhav Prasad Baral ==
Madhav Prasad Baral has a long-standing experience and established credentials as a forerunner in the area of providing both high school and higher education in the country. Baral completed his MS in Biochemistry and Ph.D. in food chemistry from the university of the Philippines. Upon his return, he served as Senior Scientific Officer for 18 years at NAST, Kathmandu, previously known as RONAST. He was also associated with the central Department of Microbiology, Tribhuwan University and more than 50 students pursuing Microbiology in the master's degree completed their dissertation under his supervision.
