= Mahendra Jyoti =

Mahendra Jyoti महेन्द्रज्योति Bansdol
- Village development committee
- Location in Nepal
- Coordinates: 27.62°N 85.50°E
- Country: Nepal
- Zone: Bagmati Zone
- District: Kabhrepalanchok District

Population (1991)
  - Total: 3,343
- Time zone: UTC+5:45 (Nepal Time)

Bansdol is officially designated as Ward No. 12 of Banepa Municipality in the Kavrepalanchok District, Bagmati Province. It was formerly the Mahendra Jyoti Village Development Committee (VDC) before the local government restructuring that integrated it into Banepa. At the time of the 1991 Nepal census it had a population of 3,343.
