= Prime FM =

Prime Fm
Banepa, Kavre; Nepal
- Broadcast area: Kavre, Sindhupalchok, Ramechhap, Dolakha, Kathmandu, Bhaktapur, Lalitpur, Sindhuli, Okhaldhunga
- Frequency: 104.5 MHz

Programming
- Languages: Nepali, Tamang, Newari

Ownership
- Owner: Eye Community Communication Center

Technical information
- Power: 1000W

Links
- Website: www.primefm.com.np

Prime Fm is a radio station in Banepa, Kavre, Nepal. It transmits on 104.5 MHz. It provides news, information and entertainment.
