= Ravi Opi =

Ravi Opi रवि ओपी
- Village development committee
- Location in Nepal
- Coordinates: 27.64°N 85.57°E
- Country: Nepal
- Zone: Bagmati Zone
- District: Kabhrepalanchok District

Population (2011)
  - Total: 4,315
- Time zone: UTC+5:45 (Nepal Time)
- Area code: 011

Ravi Opi is a village development committee in Kabhrepalanchok District in the Bagmati Zone of central Nepal. At the time of the 2011 Nepal census it had a population of 4,315 in 923 individual households. Now it was merged with Dhulikhel Municipality. The VDC office was located at the middle of village named "dudamukh"

Ravi village, though it is a relatively dry hill, shares its popularity for producing vegetables, milk and livestock meat with Pachkhal valley. Ravi has widespread organic production of tomatoes, cucumber, cauliflower, potatoes, green leaves, cabbages, maize, onions, garlic and beans. This village harbors very old Seti Devi Higher secondary school, and agricultural saving and credit co-operative on the same name. There was Ginette Harrison charity boarding school which now have merged with Seti Devi. The political awareness among the village dwellers is noticeably high; and they mostly rely upon agriculture and jobs and business.

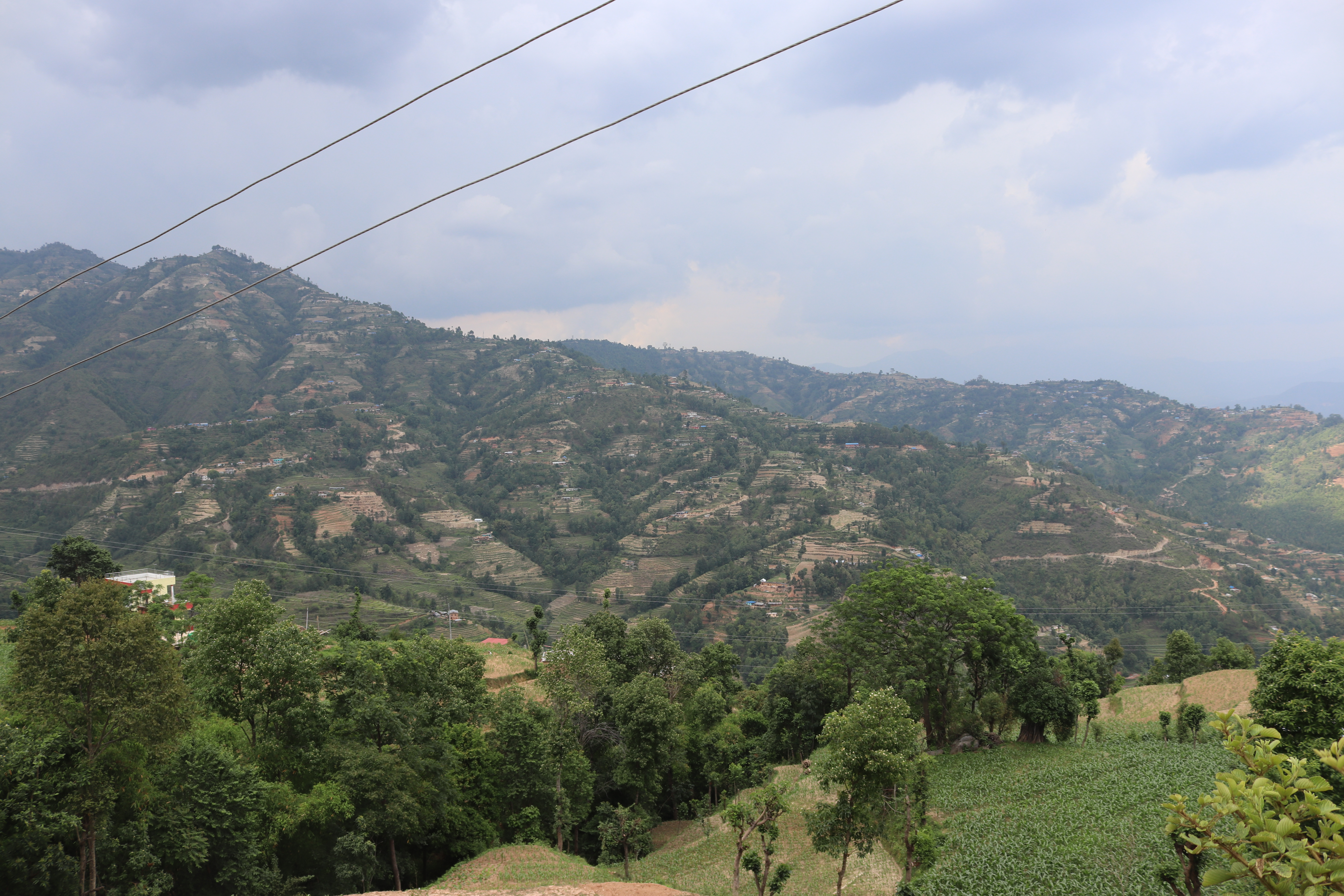
The green farmland of Ravi village wit Anekot on the backdrop

Rabi village is at about 5 kilometers of distance from Banepa major roundabout. The road is black topped up to Chapleti, a wonderful hill that offers panoramic view of Dhulikhel, Pachkhal, Anekot, Palanchok Bhagawati, Jugal and Gaurishankhar Himalayan ranges. Banepa city dwellers find this hill as a morning and evening walk destination as it takes around one and half hours walk round trip. From Chapleti, the road is gravelled way down to Seti Devi school. The road joins to Samaj kalyan chowk of Pachkhal and is thus a proposed bypass road to Araniko Highway from Banepa to Pachkhal.

There is a recently popularized waterfall named "Chhange Jharana" that lies in the bordering stream of Debitar and Rabi.
