= Devitar =

Devitar देवीटार
- Village development committee
- Location in Nepal
- Coordinates: 27.67°N 85.56°E
- Country: Nepal
- Province: Bagmati Province
- District: Kabhrepalanchok District

Population (1991)
  - Total: 2,104
- Time zone: UTC+5:45 (Nepal Time)

Devitar is a village development committee in Kabhrepalanchok District in Bagmati Province of central Nepal. At the time of the 1991 Nepal census it had a population of 2,104 and had 335 houses in it.
