= Chandeshwori Jatra =

Festival in Nepal

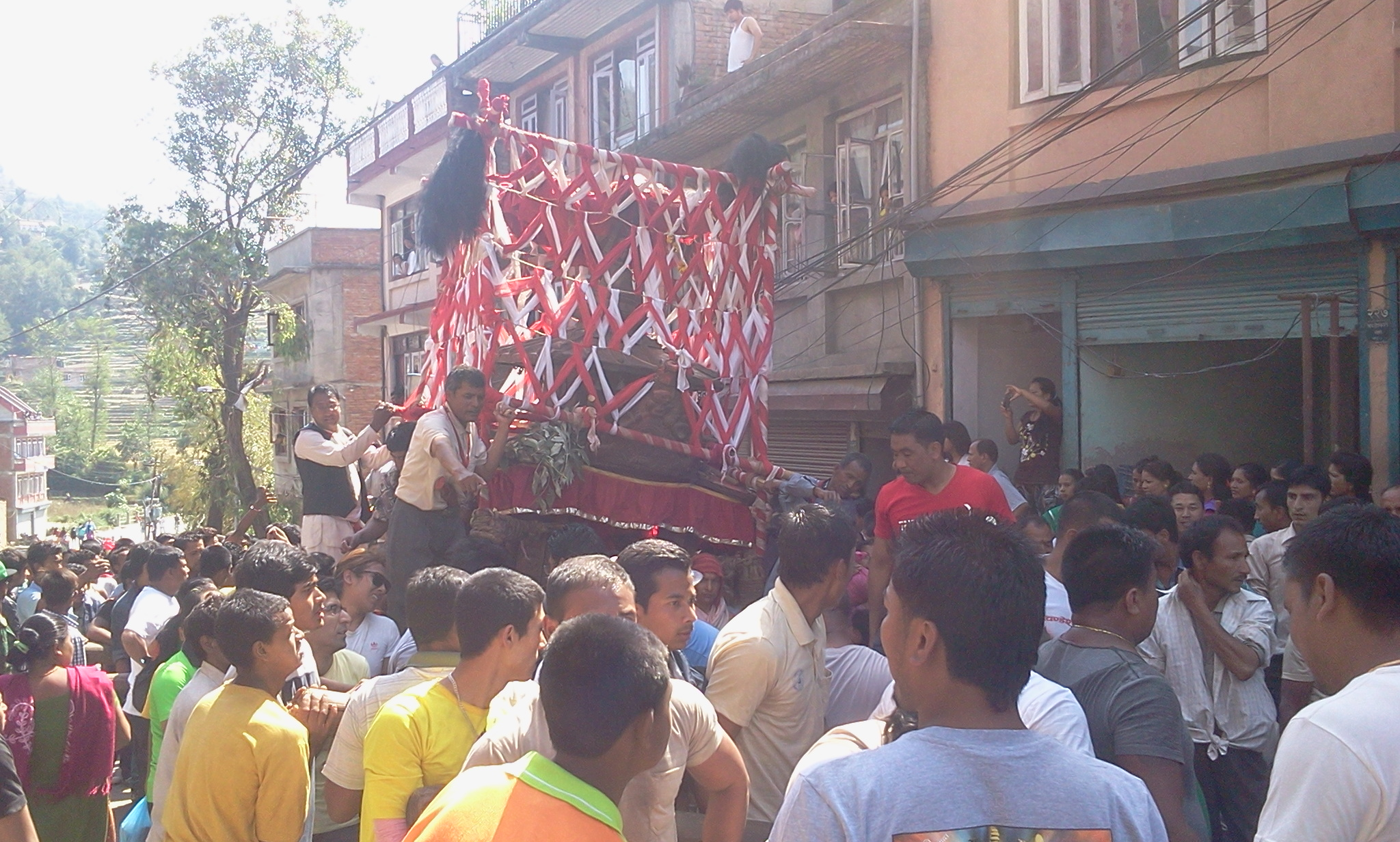
- Chariot of Chandeshwori going to main city area
- Observed by: Nepalese Hindus and Buddhists
- Type: Religious
- Significance: Victory over demon Chandasur
- Celebrations: Chariot procession on Baisakh purnima and the next day
- Observances: Procession, Mata Puja, Kalan daan
- Begins: Baisakh Purninma / Buddha Purnima
- Ends: The next day
- Date: Baisakh Purnima

Chandeshwori Jatra (चण्डेश्वरी जात्रा) is considered the largest festival in Kavrepalanchowk district, Nepal. It is celebrated for three days from the Baisakh purnima according to the Lunar calendar. The first day is the Chariot procession of goddess Chandeshwori, the next day is the worship day of the goddess( mata puja) and the last day is known as Kalan daan where devotees make various offerings to the goddess.

It is the festival of Hindu goddess Chandeshwori or Parvati.

This festival is celebrated in the honor of the victory over the demon Chandasur on the first full moon day of the New Year's festival in the country.

== See also ==
- List of Hindu festivals
