= Ugratara Janagal =

Ugratara Janagal उग्रतारा जनागाल
- Village development committee
- Location in Nepal
- Coordinates: 27.63°N 85.53°E
- Country: Nepal
- Zone: Bagmati Zone
- District: Kabhrepalanchok District

Population (1991)
  - Total: 5,197
- Time zone: UTC+5:45 (Nepal Time)

Ugratara Janagal is a village development committee in Kabhrepalanchok District in the Bagmati Zone of central Nepal. At the time of the 1991 Nepal census it had a population of 5,197 .
