= Ugrachandi Nala =

Village in Nepal

Coordinates: 27.6558°N 85.5326°E

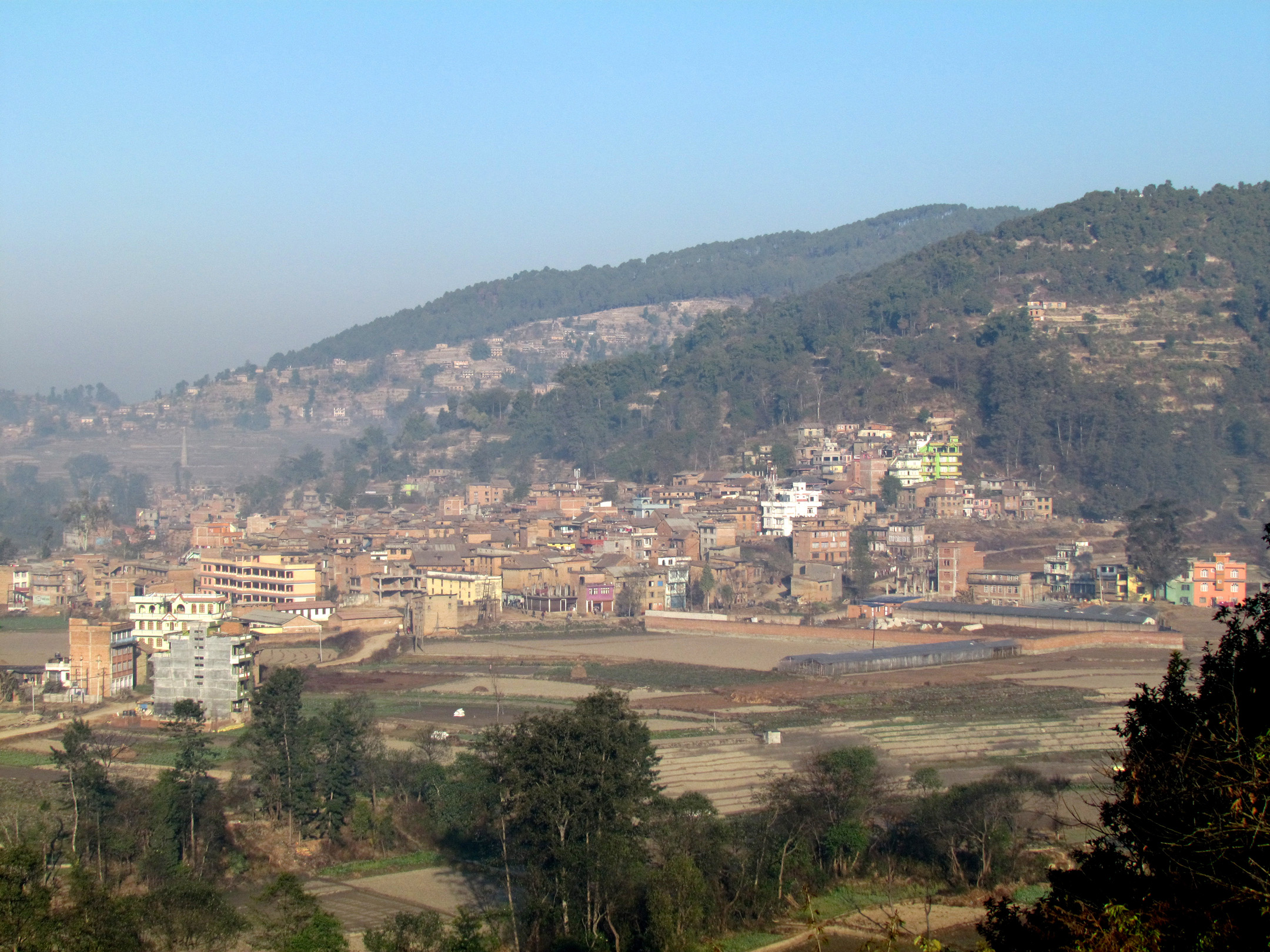
Ugrachandi Nala

Previously Ugarachandi Nala was a village development committee located in Kavrepalanchok District of Nepal. It is named after the temple of goddess Ugrachandi Bhagawati located in Nala Bazaar. But now in the year 2017 AD it has been changed and divided into ward no. 3 and 4 of Banepa municipality. According to the 1991 Nepal census, the population of the VDC is 6,327 in 1,035 individual households.

Nala Bazar, Bhandari Gaun, Shera, Aangal, Kaakre, Sumara, Tusal, Kodar, Baantal, Chunatal are the places and villages that fall under this VDC. The region is famous for potato, green vegetables and dairy. The first ever milk processing center in the country was established in Tusal in 1954 under the ministry of agriculture.

Behind the Nala Bazar lies the site of proposed Siddhartha University, a Buddhist University.The VDC has four secondary schools and a higher secondary school. They are Chandeswori higher secondary school, Lincoln Int'l School, Shree shuva chamunda secondary school, Ugrachandi secondary school and Spring Hill English school. It has a health post and has an easy access to the nearby city of Banepa.

Ugrachandai Nala is also famous from a religious viewpoint. Some of its important temples are Nala Bhagawati Temple, Chamunda Devi Tusal, Nala Karunamaya Temple, Jaleshowr MahDev Bhandari Gaun and many other religious places.

== Gallery ==
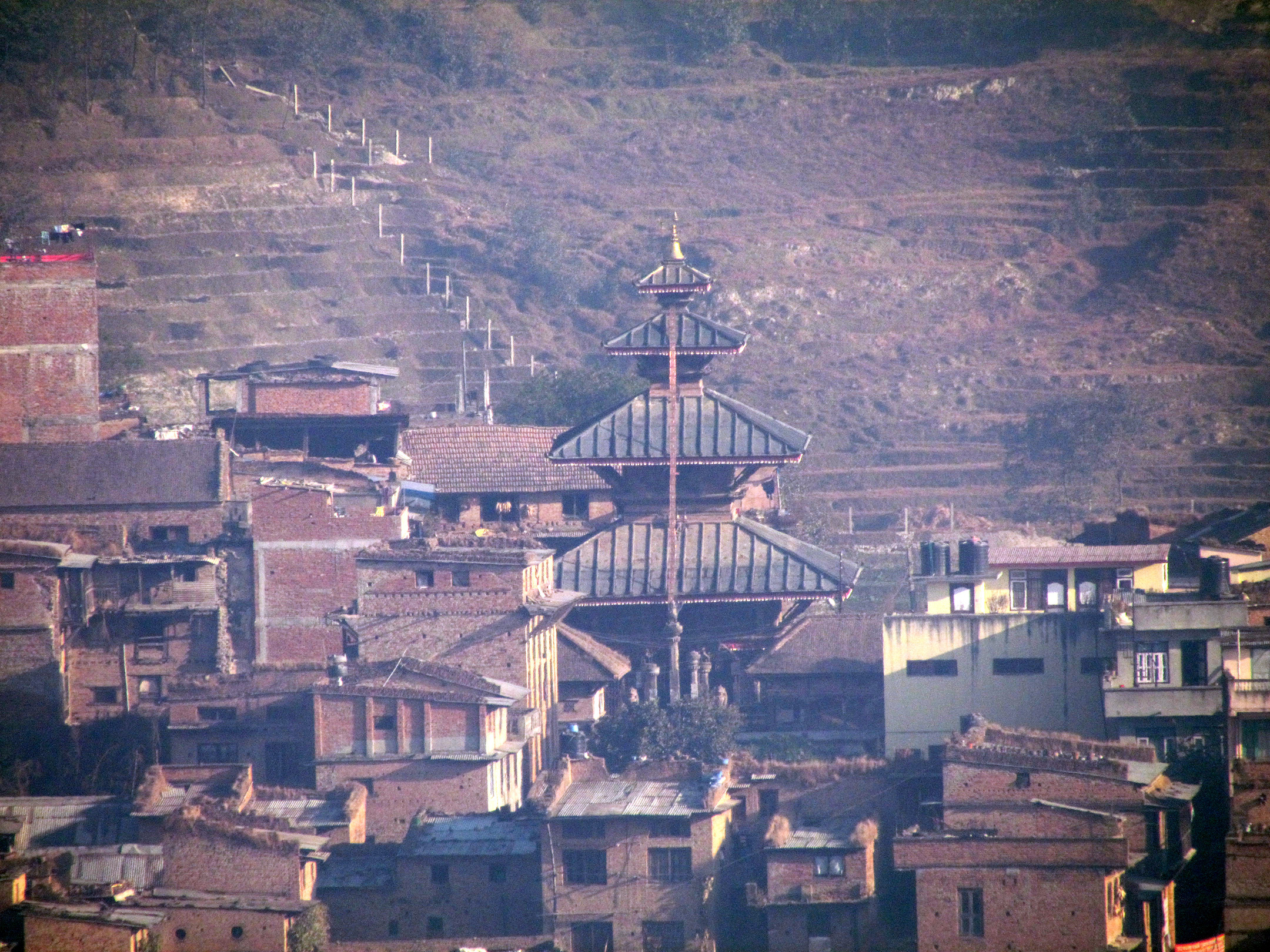
Nala Bhagawati Temple

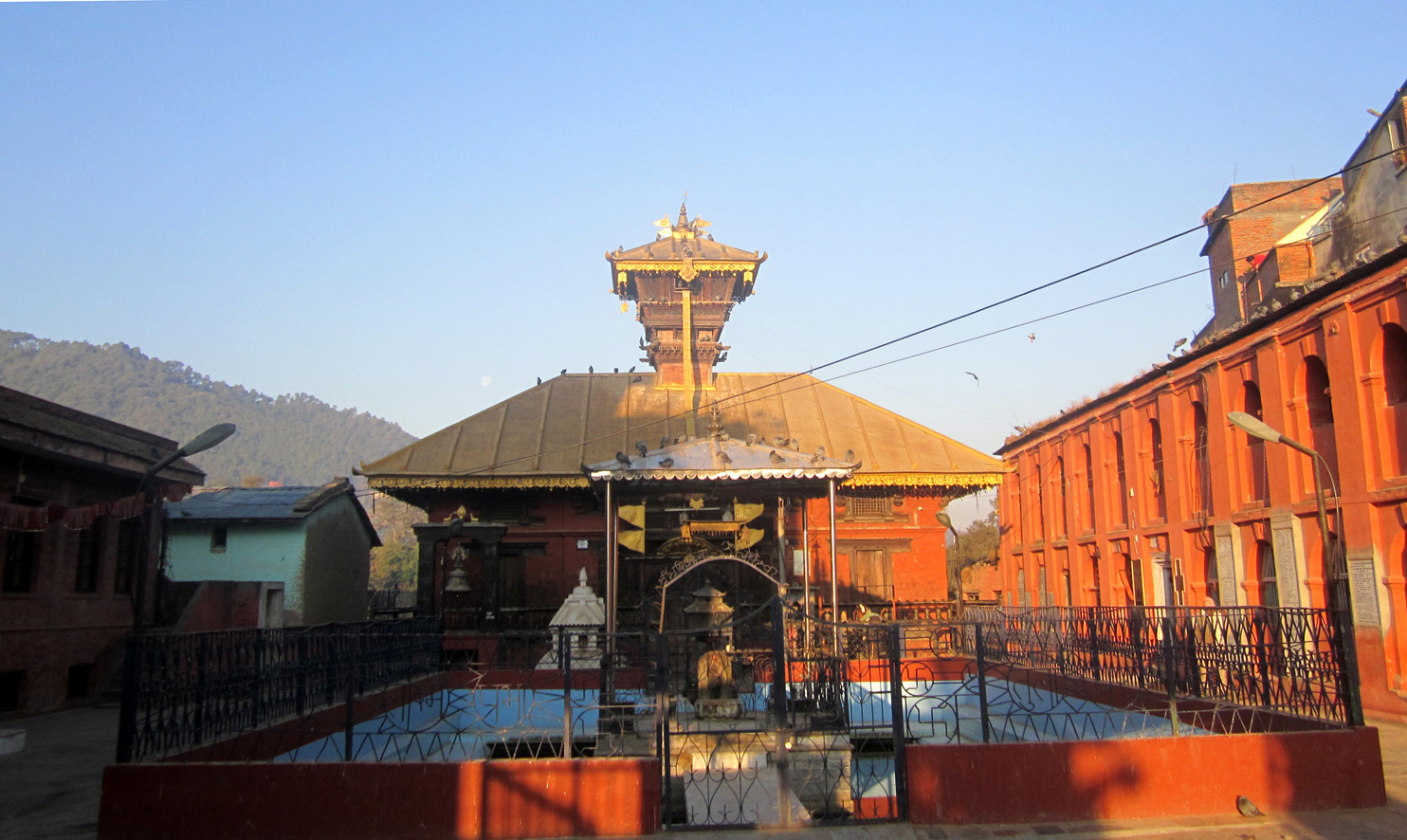
Karunamaya Temple

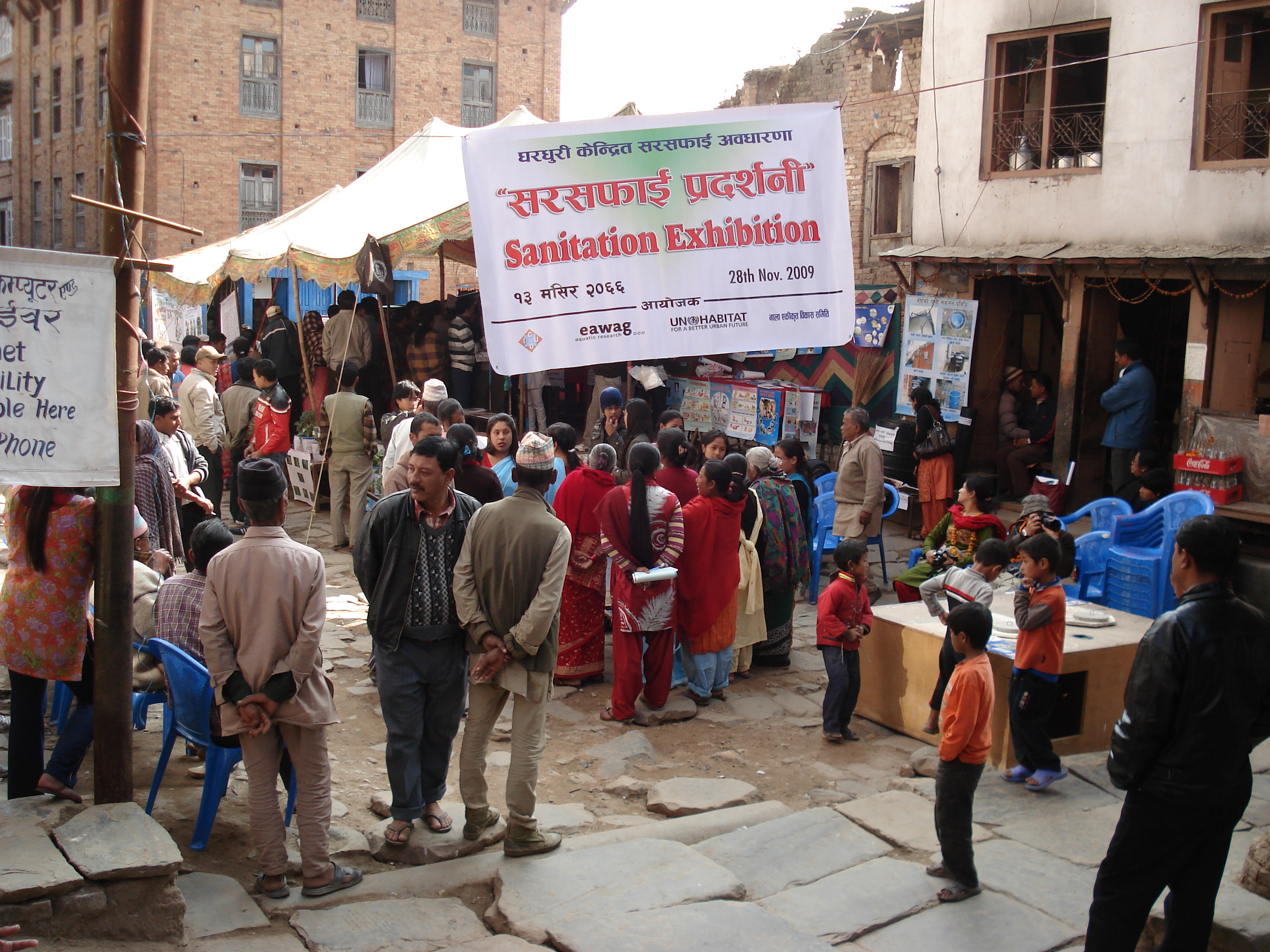
During Sanitation Bazar in Ugrachandi Nala

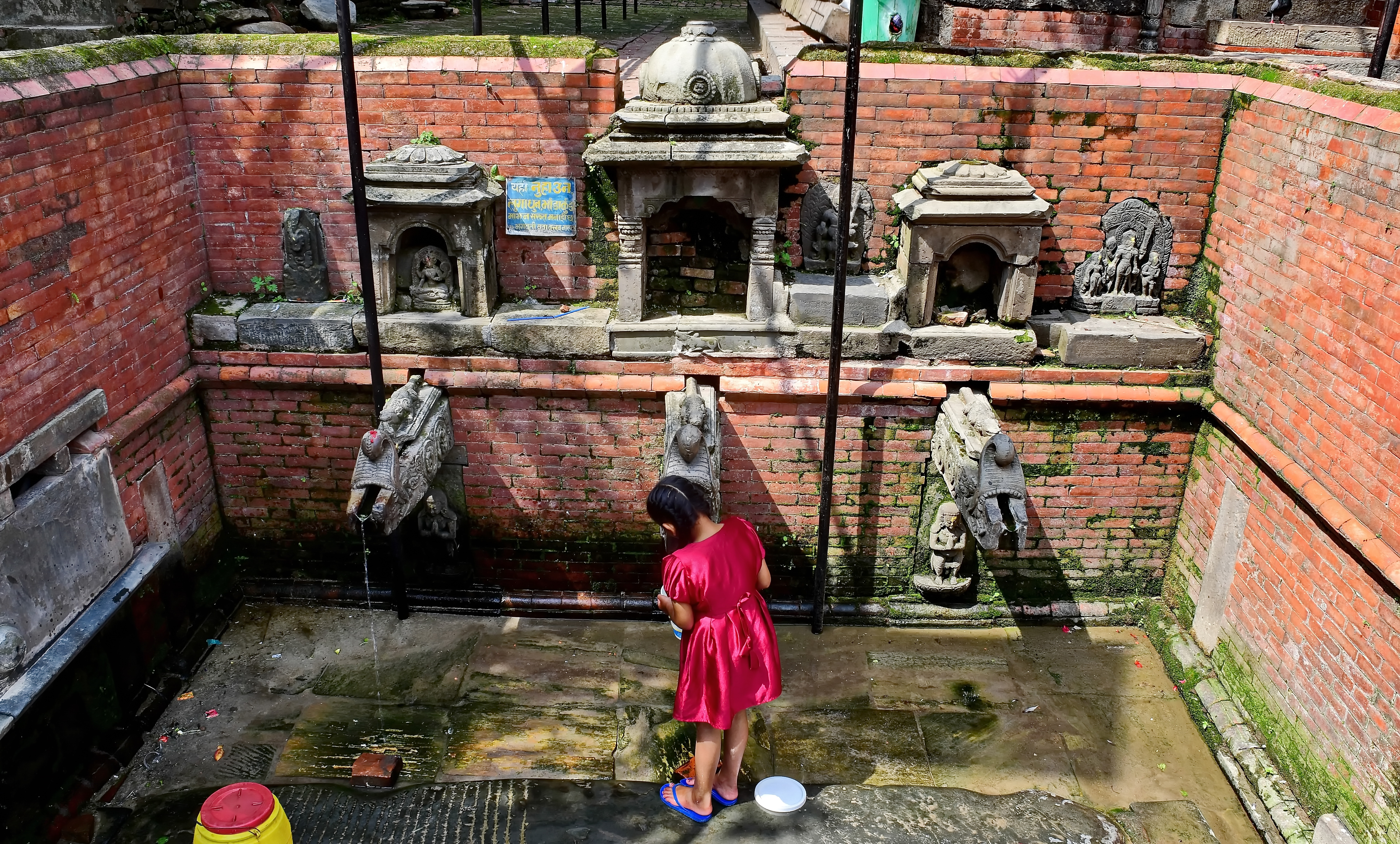
Nala Bhagawati Hiti
