= Tathali =

Tathali ताथली
- Municipality
- Location in Nepal
- Coordinates: 27.67°N 85.47°E
- Country: Nepal
- Zone: Bagmati Zone
- District: Bhaktapur District

Population (1991)
  - Total: 4,520
  - Religions: Hindu
- Time zone: UTC+5:45 (Nepal Time)
- Postal code: 44805
- Area code: 01

Tathali (Nepali: ताथली) is a City and municipality in Bhaktapur District in the Bagmati Zone of central Nepal. At the time of the 1991 Nepal census it had a population of 4,520 with 751 houses in it.

== Climate ==
Tathali has a rainfall monitoring station operated by the Department of Hydrology and Meteorology (DHM), Government of Nepal. The station provides real-time rainfall data and contributes to regional hydrological monitoring and flood forecasting systems.
