= Hospital and Rehabilitation Centre for Disabled Children =

Hospital in Banepa, Bagmati, Nepal

Hospital and Rehabilitation Centre for Disabled Children (HRDC)

Geography
- Location: Banepa, Bagmati Province, Nepal

Organisation
- Type: Teaching Hospital
- Affiliated university: SWC, Ministry of Health

History
- Founded: 1985

Links
- Website: hrdcnepal.org

Hospital and Rehabilitation for Disabled Children (Nepali: अपाङ्ग बाल अस्पताल तथा पुनर्स्थापना केन्द्र) is a hospital in Banepa, Nepal. It was founded in 1985 with the support of Terre des Hommes (TdH) of Switzerland. The ownership of this program was transferred to the Friends of the Disabled (FOD) a Nepalese non-governmental organization in 1992.

== Awards and recognition ==
- World's Top Child Health Award to Prof. (Dr.) Ashok Kumar Banskota in 2011 By World Of Children
- Stars Impact Award 2014 in health in Asia Pacific region to Prof. (Dr.) Ashok Kumar Banskota
- World of Children Alumni Award 2016 to Prof. (Dr.) Ashok Kumar Banskota

== See also ==
- List of hospitals in Nepal
