= Tukucha Nala =

Tukucha Nala टुकुचा नाला
- Village development committee
- Location in Nepal
- Coordinates: 27.67°N 85.51°E
- Country: Nepal
- Zone: Bagmati Zone
- District: Kabhrepalanchok District

Population (1991)
  - Total: 4,094
- Time zone: UTC+5:45 (Nepal Time)

Tukucha Nala is a village development committee in Kabhrepalanchok District in the Bagmati Zone of central Nepal. At the time of the 1991 Nepal census it had a population of 4,094 in 658 individual households.
