= Panauti =

Municipality in Bagmati Province, Nepal

Panauti पनौती
- Municipality
- Panauti Municipality
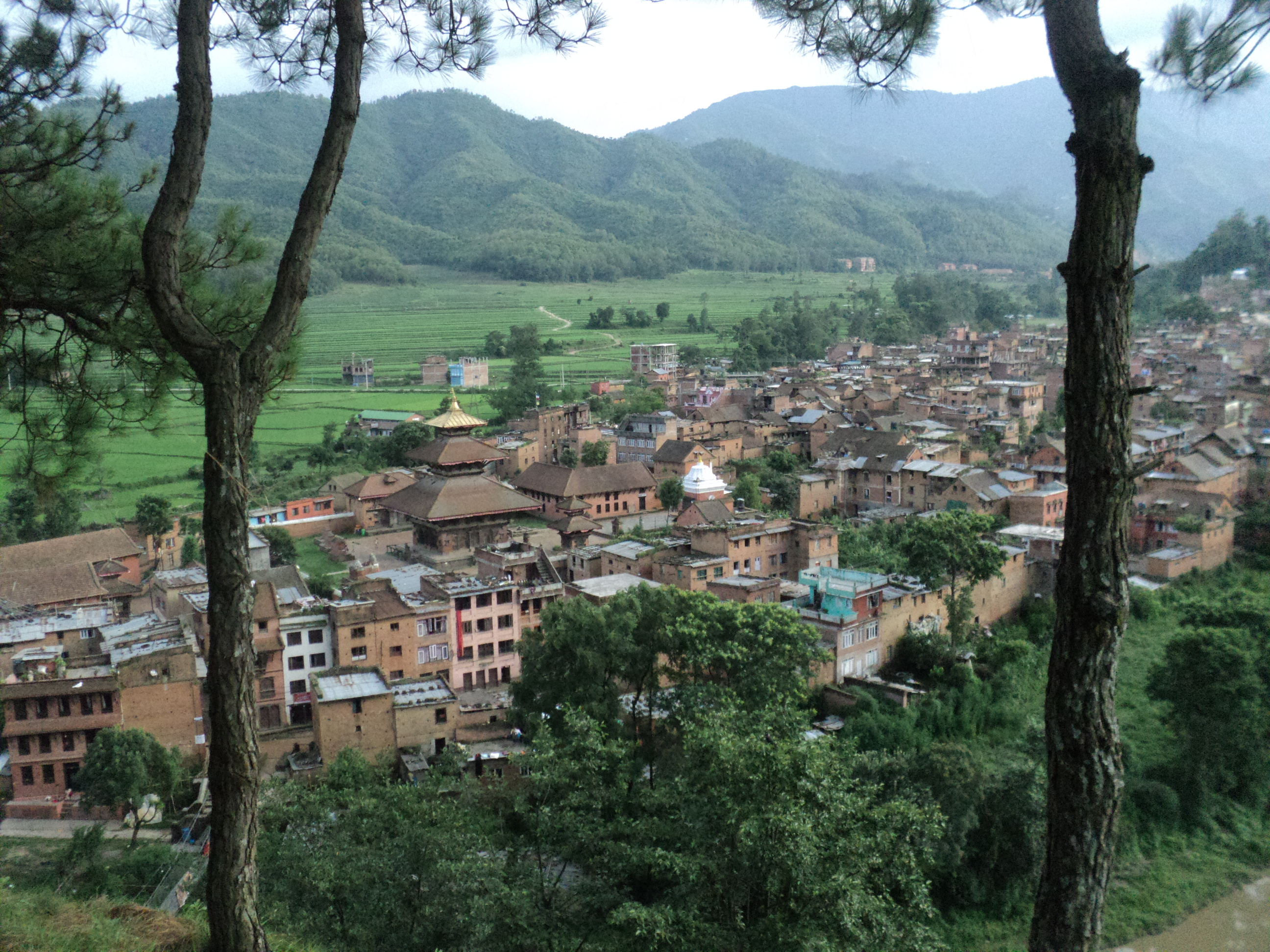
- Nicknames: Palanti; Panti; Panaati; Panchal Nagar; Asham Nagar
- Location in Nepal
- Coordinates: 27°35′N 85°31′E
- Country: Nepal
- Province: Bagmati
- District: Kavrepalanchok
- Established: 1997 January 24
- Included (VDC): Subbagaun; Taukhal; Panauti (Indreshwar); Malpi; Sunthan; Khopasi
- Incorporated (Date): 1997 January 24
- Included (VDC): Kushadevi; Rayale Bihabar; Kalati Bhumidanda; Balthali; Sarada Batase (wards 3, 4, and 9); Sankhupati Chour (ward 4)
- Incorporated (Date): 2017 March 5

Government
  - Type: Mayor–council government
  - Mayor: Ram Sharan Bhandari (Nepali Congress)
  - Deputy Mayor: Gita Banjara (CPN (UML))

Area
  - Total: 118.00 km^{2} (45.56 sq mi)
- Elevation: 1,442 m (4,731 ft)

Population (2021)Increased from 46,595 (2011 census); +5,483 (+11.8%)
  - Total: 51,504
  - Density: 436.47/km^{2} (1,130.5/sq mi)

Ethnicities
  - Hill Brahmin: 26.5%
  - Chhetri: 26.2%
  - Tamang: 22.1%
  - Newar: 17.9%

Religions
  - Hinduism: 79.0%
  - Buddhism: 18.9%
  - Christianity: 1.80%
  - Islam: 0.30%
- Time zone: UTC+5:45 (NST)
- Postal code: 45209
- Area code: 011
- Number of Wards: 12
- Website: www.panautimun.gov.np

Panauti (Nepali: पनौती) is a municipality in Kavrepalanchok District in Bagmati Province of Nepal 32 km southeast of the capital, Kathmandu. A medieval architectural complex there was nominated by the Nepalese government as a UNESCO tentative site in 1996.

== Origin ==
At the end of the 13th century, Panauti was finally integrated into the unified kingdom of Nepal, along with Kathmandu, Patan, and Bhaktapur, which are all former capital cities of the Kathmandu Valley. Panauti was a trading hub along the ancient Salt Trade route between Tibet and India. The recorded history of Panauti goes back to the first century AD. With the end of the Salt trade in the 1950s and the construction of the Arniko Highway in the 1960s bypassing the town, Panauti has gone into an economic rut. Panauti, consists of a variety of Buddhist and Hindu religious monuments, and is called to be one of the area's most important medieval sites by Lonely Planet.

== Historical ==

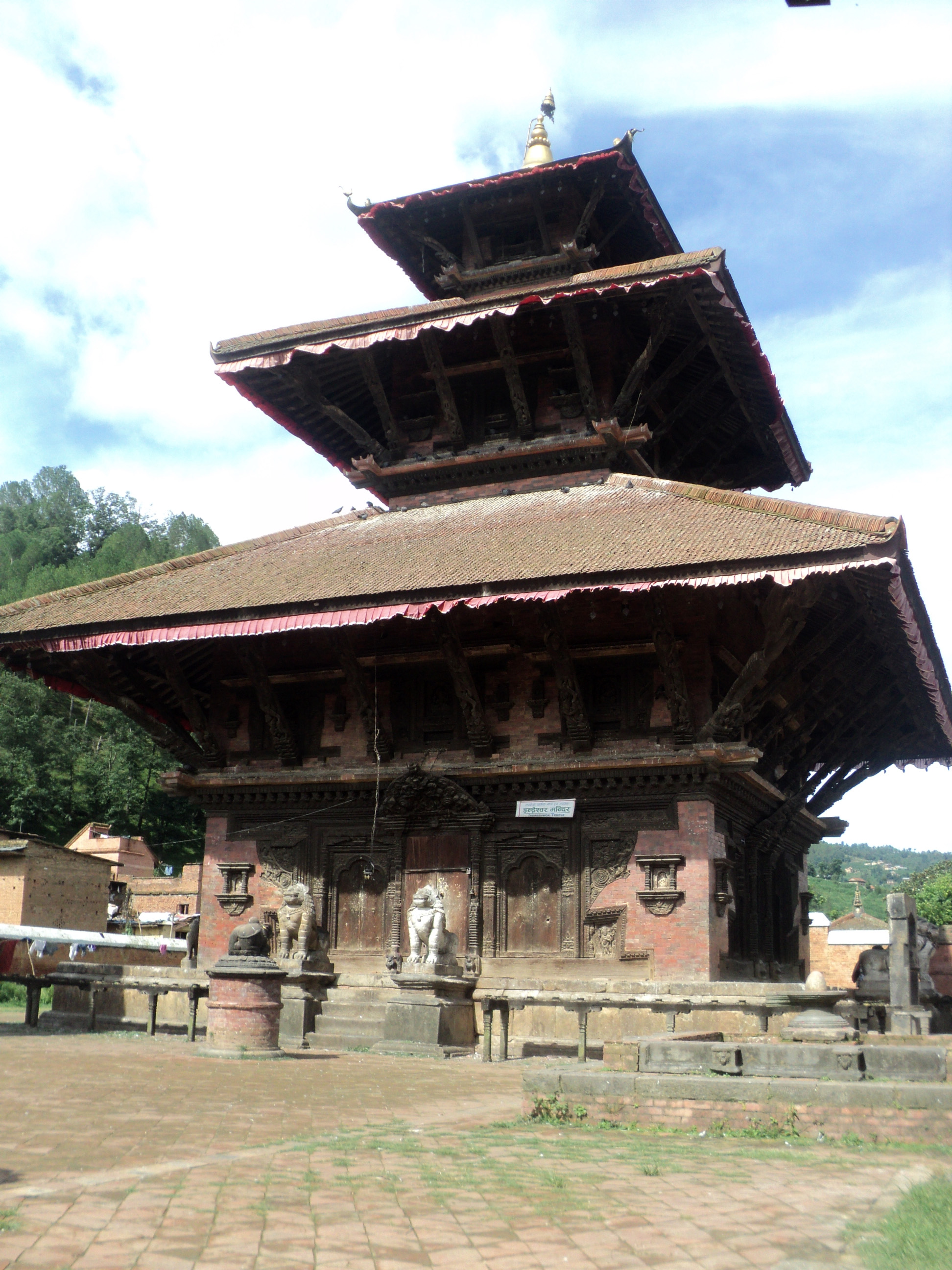
Indreshwar Mahadev temple

The Indreshwar temple is one of the largest and tallest pagoda style temples in Nepal. It was originally built over a lingam in 1294, making it the oldest surviving temple of Nepal. The roof struts embellishing the two lower stories of the temple are distinct Nepalese wood-carving and architecture. The upper section of the temple is hung with pots and pans, offerings from young married couples hoping for a happy and prosperous family life. The temple is in good condition and survived the 2015 earthquake. It is from this temple that the mystical third river of Panauti starts from leading to the Brahmayani temple across from the Tri Beni Ghats.

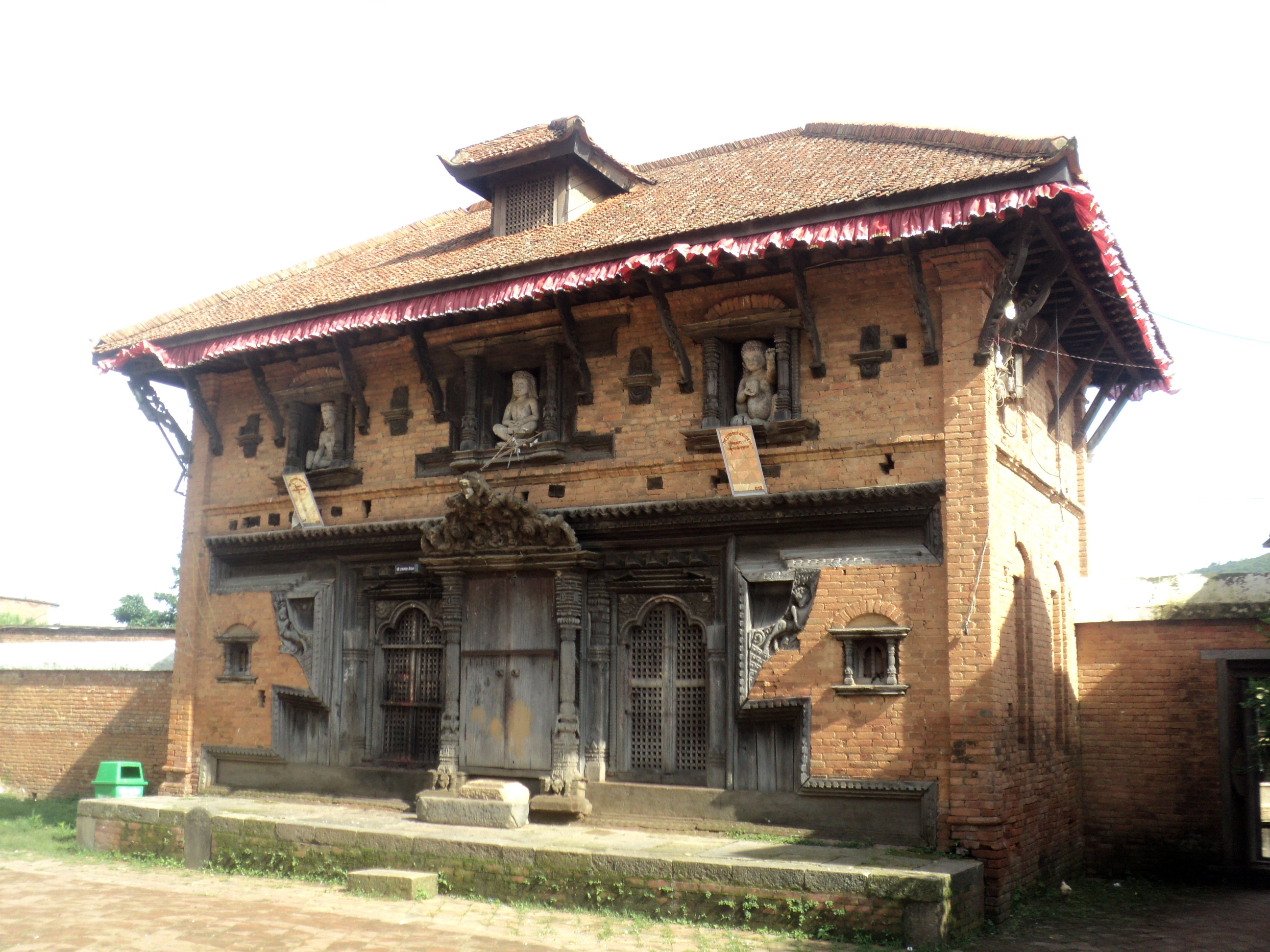
Unmanta Bhairav Temple of Panauti

== Demographics ==
At the time of the 2021 Nepal census, Panauti Municipality had a population of 51,504. Of these, 58.4% spoke Nepali, 21.10% Tamang, 16.9% Newar, 0.6% Magar Dhut, 0.5% Bhojpuri, 0.3% Maithili, and 2.1% other languages as their first language.

Languages In Panauti, 2021
Languages	Percent
Nepali	58.40%
Tamang	21.10%
Newari	16.90%
Magar Dhut	0.50%
Others	2.40%

In terms of ethnicity/caste, 26.5% were Hill Brahmin, 26.2% Chhetri, 22.10% Tamang, 17.9% Newar, 1.6% Mijar, 1.6% Pariyar, 1.4% Kami, 1.1% Magar, 0.9% Bhujel, 0.9% Sanyasi/Dasnami and 0.2% others.

Ethnicities In Panauti, 2021
Ethnicities	Percent
Hill Brahmin	26.5%
Chhetri	26.2%
Tamang	22.1%
Newar	17.9%
Mijar	1.6%
Pariyar	1.6%
Others	4.1%

In terms of religion, 79.01% were Hindu, 18.87% Buddhist, 1.79% Christian, 0.26% Muslim, and 0.3% others.

Religion In Panauti, 2021
Religion	Percent
Hinduism	79.01%
Buddhism	18.87%
Christianity	1.79%
Muslim	0.26%
Others	0.30%

In terms of literacy, 81% could read and write, 1.6% could only read and 17.0% could neither read nor write.

== Economy ==
Information Technology Park, Nepal is in Panauti municipality.

== Gallery ==
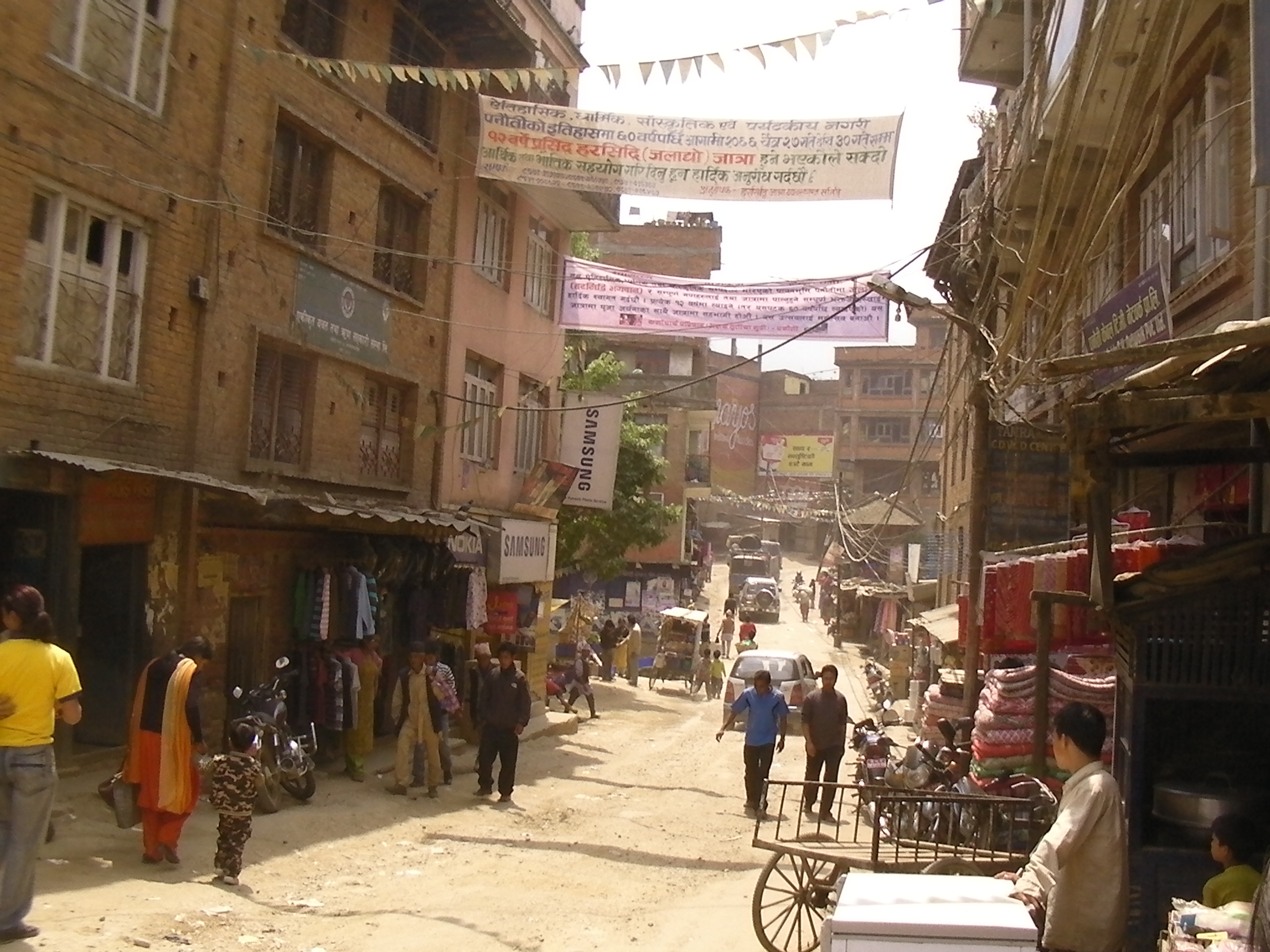
Streets of Panauti

Panauti Temple

Panauti during Makar Mela

== Notable people ==
- Hari Bansha Acharya – actor, born in Sankhu, Panauti
- Rabindra Khadka – actor raised in Sunthan, Panauti
- Shweta Khadka – Nepalese film actress, producer, and entrepreneur from Khopasi, Panauti
- Mukunda Thapa – actor from Malpi, Panauti
- Shiva Prasad Humagain – politician from Panauti
