= Satya Raj Chaulagain =

Nepalese film director (born 1990)

Satya Raj Chaulagain सत्य राज चौलागाई
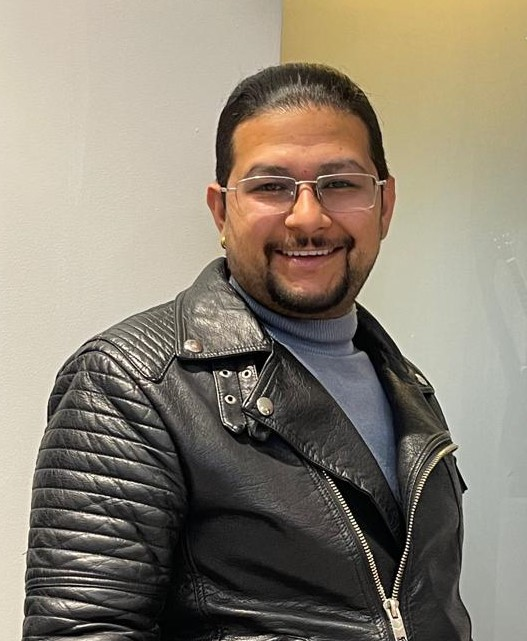

Background information
- Born: 19 May 1990 (age 36); Nepal
- Origin: Nepali
- Occupations: Film director, film writer, producer
- Years active: 2011–present

Satya Raj Chaulagain (Nepali: सत्य राज चौलागाई; born 19 May 1990) is a Nepali film director, writer, producer, and lyricist. For the past 11 years, he has been involved in Nepali films, working as a director.

== Biography ==
Chaulagain began his professional career as an assistant director on the film Mayako Barima under the direction of Dayaram Dahal. In his career, served as chief assistant director on films such as Kohinoor, Naike, Ko Afno, Bhag Sani Bhag, Ke Ma Timro Hoina Ra, and Ma Yesto Get Gauchhu. Chaulagain has directed numerous music videos and a few short films beyond film industry. In 2018, he made his directorial debut with Movie Anuraag, which was produced by Rishi Dhamala. He has directed the most popular songs like "Chahanchhu-2", Aama, and Mero Desh Nepal. He has been Nominated in 7th National Rapti Music Award 2075 BS, for song Yasto Saathi (movie : anuraag) as a lyricist.He is the member of Chalchitra Nirdesan Samaaj.

== Songs ==
SN	Songs Name	Credit	Singer	Release date	ref
1	Mero Desh Mero Nepal	lyricist		Releasing soon	
2	Tan Mann Dhan	lyricist	Sabin Subedi	2025	
3	Chahanchhu -2	Director	Rachana Rimal	2022	
4	Eklo Banayeu	lyricist	Nogen Limbu	2021	
5	Aama	Director	Prabin Rajthala	2021	
6	Timro Sorma	lyricist	Pratab Das	2018	
7	Yesto Sathi	lyricist	Sugam Pokharel, Anju Panta	2018	

== Movie ==
SN	Movie name	Credit	Cast	Release date	Reference
1	Pratibairam	Producer		2026	
2	Aantre	Director	Mukun Bhusal	Releasing soon	
3	Bichchhed	Director	Mukun Bhusal, Laxmi Bardewa	2023	
4	Mero Katha	Director	Prakash Braily, Sabatri Bajracharya	2020	
5	Anurag	Director	Aliza Gautam, Samundra Pandit	2018	
6	Ma Yesto Gauchhu	Chief Assistant DIrector	Paul Shah / Pooja Sharma	2017	
7	K Ma Timro Hainara	Chief Assistant DIrector	Aaryan Adhikari / Mariska Pokherel	2016	
8	Bhag Sani Bhag	Chief Assistant DIrector	Sabin Shrestha / Keki Adhikari	2016	
9	Ko aafno	Chief Assistant DIrector	Rajan Khatiwada / Sushank Mainali / Subash Thapa	2016	
10	Nagarik	Executive Producer	Sarita Giri / Ramesh Budhathoki / Ganesh Uperiti / Anu Shah	2015	
11	Kohinoor	Chief Assistant DIrector	Shree Krishna Shrestha / Shweta Khadka	2014	
12	Maya ko Barima	Assistant DIrector	Rajesh Hamal / Karishma Manandhar / Keki Adhikari	2012	
13	Helicopter	Producer			

== Awards ==
SN	Awards	Awards Title	Result
1	7th National Rapti Music Award 2075 BS	‘ Yasto Saathi’ Lyricist - Movie Song Anurag	Nominated
2	First Everest International Film Award 2019	‘Debut Director’ Film Anurag	Nominated
3	8 th National Rapti Music Awards	Best DIrector - Musci Chahanchhu 2	Nominated
4	8 th National Rapti Music Awards	Best lyricist - Song Maya Timi Sangai	Nominated
5	2nd Star Music & film Award 2023	Best Music video Director - Chahanchhu 2	Won
6	2nd Star Music & FIlm Award 2023	Best nepali modern lyricist Maya Timi sangai	Nominated
7	2nd Jeevanta Nepal Music Award 2023	Best Modern Music Video Director of the year - Sapana Banera	Won
8	2nd Jeevanta Nepal Music Award 2023	Best Modern Song Lyricist of the year - Maya Timi Sangai	Nominated
9	Sauraha South Asian Film Festival - 2024	Best Writer/Script - Bichchhed	Won
10	Bindabasini Music Award 2024	Best Modern Song Lyricist of the Year - Sanga Sangai Bachaula	Won
11	4th Himalayan International Award - 2024	Best Modern Song Lyricist of the Year - Sanga Sangai Bachaula	Nominated
12	2nd Birat Music & Film Award - 2023 AD	Best Modern Music Video Director of the year - Chahanchhu 2	Won

== Honor ==
SN	Honor Title	Reference
1	Rastrya Samabesi Music Awards 2079 (BS)	
2	Music Video Director Guide of Nepal - Shrastha Saman 2080(BS)	
3	Golden Horse International Award - 2080 (BS)	

== Jury ==
SN	Organization Name	Organizar	ref
1	National Inclusive Music Award(NIM) - 2023	Power International Media	
2	11th Nepal Africa Film Festival (NAFF) 2023	College of Journalism & Mass Communication	
3	National Boxoffice Teej Music Award - 2023	Box office International	
