= Shiva Regmi =

Nepalese film director

- शिव रेग्मी
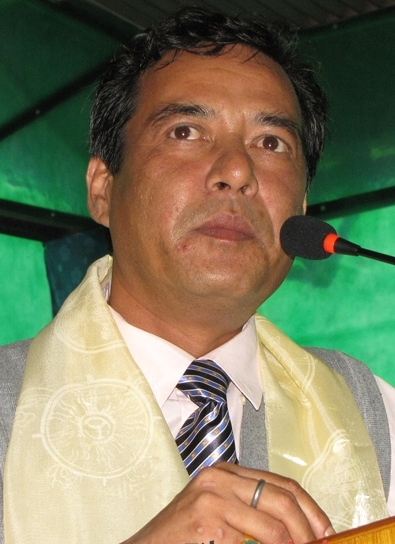
- Regmi at Press Conference for Hasi Deu Ek Fera
- Born: 2021 BS (CE 1965); Chitwan, Nepal
- Died: 9 December 2013 (aged 49); Kathmandu, Nepal
- Years active: 1991–2013
- Notable work: Aafanta, Duniya, Hami Tin Bhai, Muglan, Kaha Bhetiyela
- Spouse: Gyanu Regmi (m. 1985)

Shiva Regmi (Nepali: शिव रेग्मी) (1965 – 9 December 2013) was a Nepali film director, producer and screenwriter. His debut film as a director was Aafanta, which was released in 1999, and his last film was So Simple, which was released in 2012. He has worked on over one hundred films. Regmi received the National Film Awards for best director in 2010 for his work on the film Duniya, and again in 2012 for his work on Kaha Bhetiyela. In 2013, he won the National Film Awards for best writer for his work on the film Hasi Deu Ek Phera. He is regarded as one of Nepal's earliest filmmakers to give female characters some significant roles at a time when traditional audiences tended to see the male lead as the only significant character in a movie.

== Career ==
=== Early career ===
Born in Chitwan, Nepal, Regmi started his career as a theatrical actor, director and writer. He worked at Narayani kala mandir for many years, writing, directing and acting in many of his own plays. He won the National award for best drama writer for Swades Bhitra Harayeko Nagarik in 1993. This play, along with Pukaar brought Regmi national attention, and both were performed widely throughout Nepal. His first film work was as a writer for Prem Puja but he did not receive wide recognition as a film writer until his success with Mohoni. After writing the scripts for several movies he debuted as a director with Aafanta. He followed this with several more films, including Aafno Manchhe, Yeh Mero Hajur, Sukha Dukha, Haami Teen Bhai, Kaha Bhetiyela and many more. After this he wrote scripts for many movies like Allare, Dahijo, Maiti, Gorkhali, Dharti and so on. He also appeared as a supporting actor in Sindoor Poote along with Rajesh Hamal.

=== Mainstream breakthrough (1999–2002) ===
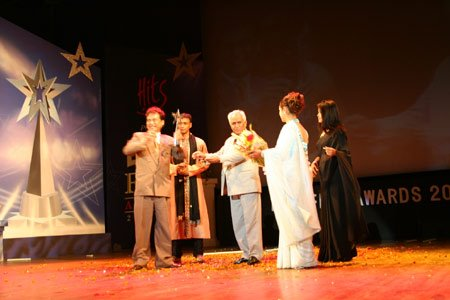
Regmi receiving lux film award 2003 for best director for Sukha dukha

In 1999 Regmi's most ambitious script, Aafanta, was rejected by many directors, so he chose to direct the film himself. After the success of Aafanta, he reassembled the cast for Aafno Manchhe, but this time he included Dilip Rayamajhi and Bipana Thapa in the lead. Aafno Manchhe was the huge success, and is counted among the biggest hit movies of Nepali film cinema. He got Film Awards for Best Dialogue for the movie. His next film was Ye Mero Hajur. He again turned to star Shree Krishna Shrestha; the movie was a box office hit. In 2002 he directed Sukha Dukha: an emotional family drama which was again a huge hit at the box office. He received the Lux Award for best director and motion picture award for best story.

Regmi's experimental movie Paahuna was a moderate success and Upahaar was a flop that came in 2004. In 2004 he returned with big hit movies like Hami Tin Bhai and Muglaan. Nikhil Upreti got his first national award for best actor for his performance in Haami Teen Bhai. Regmi's first films as a producer, Maanis and Duniya, were box office failures although both were critically acclaimed. Regmi received the NEFTA award for best director for Maanis and his first national award for best director for Duniya in 2005. His next movies, Ram Balram and Yuddha were below average at box office. But in 2008 his MaHa project Kaha Bhetiyela was one of the biggest hits of his career; he received his second national award for best director and NEFTA award for best popular director of 2008. His first movie with MaHa (Madan Krishna Shrestha and Hari Bansha Acharya) in 2010 was below average but he received his third national award for best writer. Saathi Ma Timro in 2011 was a box office success. His new film Phool released on 4 May 2012. So simple was released on the festival eve of Bada dashain along with other 3 movies. Box office report was below the mark but Regmi was critically praised for his work. While his latest projects, Mann Le Mann Lai Chhunchha and Paraai are set to release later in 2013.

== Shiva Regmi's Plays ==
Year	Play	Role	Cast	Venue
1991	Nepali Khai	Director, writer	Kamal shrestha Puspa Acharya; Janardan Dhakal; Prem shrestha Laxman Nepal	Shahid chwok Narayani kala mandir(1997)(Chitwan)
1991	BhatteKaji ko Sapana	Director, writer	Kamal Shrestha; Prem Sharma; Baburam Dawadi; Radhika lama Laxman Nepal	Narayani Kala Mandir(Chitwan)
1991	Sahara	Director, writer	Kamal Shrestha; Hom poudel Radhika lama Ishwori Baral; Prakash Karmacharya; Sharda Gurung; Raju Shrestha; Rama Basnet; Krishna Puri; Baburam dawadi	Narayani kala Mandir(Chitwan)
1991	Hatya	Director	Prem Sharma; Bina prajapati Bimal poudel Laxman Nepal	Narayani kala Mandir(Chitwan)
1992	Manchan Huna Nasakeko Natak	Director	Prem Sharma; Bina Prajapati; Saroj Shrestha; Prakash Karmacharya	Narayani Kala Mandir(Chitwan)
1992	Pukar	Director, writer	Ganesh Upreti; Baburam Dawadi; Prem Sharma; Krishna puri Bimal poudel Laxman Nepla; Samir Thapa; Kamal shrestha	Narayani Kala Mandir(Chitwan); Pragya Pratistan(kathmandu)
1993	Swades Bhitra Harayeko Nagarik	Director, writer	Kamal shrestha Radhika Lama; Prem Sharma; Prem shrestha Laxman Nepal; Bimal Poudel; Ganesh Upreti; Pawan k.c(Child artist); Prakash Karmacharya; Hom Poudel; Sharda gurung	Shahid chwok Narayani Kala Mandir(Chitwan); Pragya Pratistan(kathmandu) (Won 4 Awards in National Play Festival in Pragya Pratisthan, Kamaladi, Kathmandu); Shiva Regmi(Best writer); Laxam Nepal(Supported Actor); Pawan k.c(child actor); Radika lama
1994	Yatri(Musical play-Laxmi Prasad Devkota)	Director	Puspa Archarya; Kamal Shrestha; Manoj Lama; Anita Gurung; Kishor Chawdary; Pradeep kumal Tara Dhakal; Purnimal Shrestha	Narayani Kala Mandir(Chitwan)
1994	Bhanubhakta ra Ghaasi	Director, writer	Kamal Shrestha; Puspa Shrestha	Narayani kala Mandir(Chitwan)
1994	Kramasha	Director, writer	Kamal shrestha Himraj Poudel; Bimal poudel Laxman Nepal; Prem Sharma	Narayani kala Mandir(Chitwan)
1994	Yo Kasto Jwaai	Director, writer, actor	Shiva Regmi; Laxman Nepal	Narayani Kala Mandir(Chitwan)
1994	Shreemati Ko Ausadi	Director, writer, actor	Shiva Regmi; Puspa Acharya; Prem Sharma; Krishna puri Dilu Shahi; Bina Prajapati	Narayani Kala Mandir(Chitwan)
1996	Maato Boldaina	Director, writer, actor	Radhika Lama; Kamal Shrestha; Puspa Acharya; Pradeep Kumal; Laxmi gurung	Narayani Kala Mandir(Chitwan)

== Filmography ==
Year	Movie	Role	Cast	Note
1999	Aafanta	Director, writer	Shree Krishna Shrestha; Niruta Singh	
2001	Afno Manchhe	Director, writer	Bipana Thapa; Dilip Rayamajhi; Shree Krishna Shrestha; Niruta Singh	Motion Pictures Awards for Best Dialogue
2002	A Mero Hajur	Director, writer	Shree Krishna Shrestha; Jharana Thapa	
2002	Sukha Dukha	Director, writer	Shree Krishna Shrestha; Jharana Thapa; Madan Krishna Shrestha	Lux Film Awards for Best Director
2003	Upahaar	Director	Niruta Singh; Uttam Pradhan; Sushil Chhetri	
2003	Paahuna	Director, writer	Shree Krishna Shrestha; Jharana Thapa	Best Child Artist Sushmita Regmi for Pahuna
2004	Haami Tin Bhai	Director, writer	Rajesh Hamal; Shree Krishna Shrestha; Nikhil Upreti; Jharana Thapa; Rekha Thapa	
2004	Muglaan	Director, writer	Jharana Thapa; Dilip Rayamajhi; Bipana Thapa	Best Lyricist: Suresh Adhikari for Muglan
2005	Duniya	Director, writer	Bhuwan K.C. Tripti Nadakar; Niruta Singh; Nikhil Upreti	National Film Awards for Best Director
2006	Maanis	Director, producer, writer	Bhuwan K.C. Nikhil Upreti; Ramit Dhungana; Bipana Thapa; Dilip Rayamajhi	NEFTA Awards for Best Director
2007	Yuddha	Director	Nikhil Upreti; Shiva Shrestha; Sanchita Luitel	
2007	Ram Balram	Director	Nikhil Upreti; Shree Krishna Shrestha; Jharana Thapa; Sanchita Luitel	
2008	Kaha Bhetiyela	Director, writer	Shree Krishna Shrestha; Shewta Khadka	National Film Awards for Best Director NEFTA awards for best director
2009	Haasi Deu Ek Phera	Director, writer	Madan Krishna Shrestha; Hari Bansha Acharya; Shweta Khadka; Raj Ballav Koirala	National Film Awards for Best Writer
2011	Sathi Ma Timro	Director, writer	Bhuwan K.C. Rekha Thapa	
2012	Phool	Director		
2012	Mann Le Mann Lai Chhunchha	Director	Garima Panta	
2012	Parai	Director	Niraj Baral; Garima Panta	
2012	So Simple	Director	Raj Ballav Koirala; Pramod Bhardwaj; Bhawana Regmi; Shewta Bhattarai	

Aafanta

Immense love for cinema brought Regmi to mainstream movie-making from plays. He was always sure about the theme of his movie to be social drama. Movie was praised especially for the good story and strong performance of Shree krishna shrestha and Niruta singh. Niruta singh won Motion picture award for best actress that year(2000A.D) from this movie. Regmi was acknowledged with the best story and best director nomination. The movie was a smashed hit. Songs like pauju ko chham chham is still hit among cine lovers.

Aafno Manchhe

Regmi reunited with Shree Krishna Shrestha and Niruta Singh along with Bipana Thapa and Dilip Rayamajhi with social drama story. This movie is taken as one of the cult masala movie in Nepali film industry. This movie is considered as all-time blockbuster movie of Nepal. It recorded 51 days celebration in 9 cinema theatre in Kathmandu only and 100 days run in various places in Nepal. Chatta rumal kya malum song had created euphoria in Nepal. This song was recreated in 2019 in movie Yatra, which was again a huge hit song. Regmi won his first prominent award, Motion pictures award for best dialogue and gained the nomination for best direction.

Haami Teen Bhai

The film features three of biggest Superstar actors of late 90s and 2000s era- Rajesh Hamal, Shree Krishna Shrestha and Nikhil Upreti in the lead roles supported by Rekha Thapa, Jharana Thapa, Nandita KC, Keshab Bhattrai, Sushila Rayamajhi, Ravi Giri etc. The movie was critically and commercially successful, with many critics highlighting its screenplay, music comedy and the actors' performance especially of its lead actors but over the top action scenes were criticized. It is one of the highest-grossing films in Nepali film history . It is considered a classic movie by fans. Nikhil Upreti received the Best Actor in First National Films Award 2062 BS for the role of younger brother Laxman/Abhishek.

== Personal ==
Shiva Raj Regmi is the eldest son of Late Khaga Raj Regmi and Bhakta Maya Regmi. He was born in Baraghare in Chitwan District, Nepal in 1965. He spent his childhood in Chitwan and Gorkha. He married Gyanu Regmi in 1985; together they have four children: Samjhana, Bhanawan, Abhishesh and Pallabi Regmi. Bhawana Regmi has started her own film career, appearing in So Simple, directed by Shiva Regmi.

== Death ==
In March 2013 Regmi was admitted in Om hospital, ktm for the first time with the complaint of general illness such as diarrhoea and vomiting. When a whole health checkup was done, creatinine was found on the higher side i.e. 2.3. On general advice he was discharged from hospital. He was consistently in contact with the Nephro department doctors of Om hospital (Dr. P.k Chettri, Dr. Prakash Poudel, Dr. Dhiraj Manander). Gradually the creatinine and urea raised to higher side. Then he was advised to do Peritoneal dialysis from May 2013.

Gyanu Regmi (wife) was trained to do peritoneal dialysis. Bhawana Regmi is a staff nurse of Om hospital so it was easy for her to take care of her father. In August 2013 Regmi had stroke and lost vision for 48 hours. Because of bad health he was shifted from teaching hospital, maharajgunj to Om hospital. After 48 hours his health was improved. On 14 August 2013 he went Delhi, India for further treatment. In Sir Gangaram Hospital doctors advised him to take anti-tubercular drugs as he had persistent fever of unknown origin. As he was an immunocompromised person, the ATD drug was started. He returned to Nepal after two weeks' stay. Renal transplant was planned for 14 November 2013. In October 2013 he had convulsion and the cause for it was not diagnosed. After few days he had a stroke which paralyzed the left half of his body (hemiplegia). He wished to visit home town Chitwan. He was taken to Chitwan by ambulance. After few days of stay he developed difficulty in breathing. Immediately he was taken to CMS hospital of Chitwan. Due to the period of Laxmi puja, doctors were not available. Then after 5 days he was diagnosed with nosocomial pneumonia. On 7 November ventilatory support was given. After failed trial treatment of CMS hospital of Chitwan he was taken to Vayoda hospital of Balkhu, ktm by air ambulance on 27 November. He was planned to be taken to max hospital of Delhi, India on 9 December. But he died of kidney failure on 9 December 2013 at the age of 49 in Kathmandu.
