= Prakash Subedi =

Nepalese television presenter

- प्रकाश सुवेदी
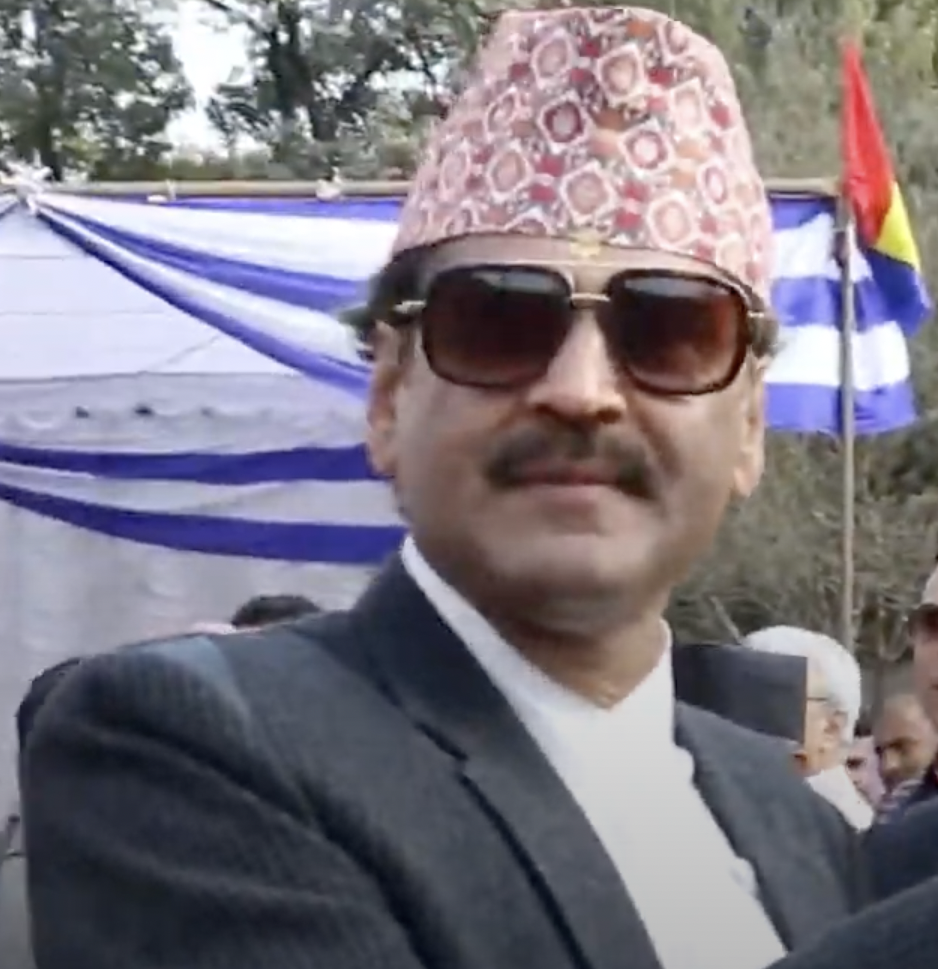
- Subedi in 2017
- Born: Bhojpur, Nepal
- Other name: Rajatpat Uncle
- Occupation: Television presenter
- Years active: 1989-present
- Known for: Rajatpat

Prakash Subedi (Nepali: प्रकाश सुवेदी), better known as Rajatpat Uncle, is a Nepalese television presenter and television show director. Some of his well-known television programs include Rajatpat, Risani Maaf, Glamour Guff, and Bagina. Along with directing the well-liked comedic television shows Harke Haldar and Risaani Maaf, he has also played a minor role in the 2004 Nepali film Hami Tin Bhai. In the Nepali film industry, he is well known for his reviews and critiques of recent releases, which he typically performs through his program Rajatpat. He is infamous for getting into arguments with celebrities when he criticizes them on his show.

== Filmography ==
=== Films ===
- Saathi (1999) - as Doctor
- Hami Tin Bhai (2004) - as Doctor

=== Television ===
- Rajatpat - presenter
- Bagina - presenter
- Glamour Guff - host
- The Prakash Subedi Show - host
- Harke Haldar - director
- Risaani Maaf - director

== Controversies ==
=== Glamour Guff with Pooja Sharma ===
During one of the episodes of his show Glamour Guff, while taking interview of an actress Pooja Sharma, he asked certain questions based on country and politics, which she failed to answer and even provided incorrect answers to some of the basic questions. She was criticized by the audience regarding her general knowledge. She was unhappy with the response she received from the audience and the certain parts of the interview which she expected Subedi to remove. She filed a case against him in Film Development Board, where she claimed that he asked her certain questions with the purpose of vilifying her. Later he apologized to her, and they eventually came to an agreement after months-long argument.

=== Chhabi Raj Ojha and Shilpa Pokhrel divorce ===
All of his shows were banned on AP1 television, due to the complaint filed by producer Chhabi Raj Ojha and actress Shilpa Pokhrel regarding his comments on their divorce.

=== Controversy regarding Mahanayak ===
In one of the Glamour Guff episodes, Deepa Shree Niraula refused to recognize actor Rajesh Hamal as mahanayak (superstar) of Nepali film industry. She also criticized him for his disappearance from the film industry for a long period of time. Furthermore, she said Bhuwan K.C. should be recognized as the industry's mahanayak. She received negative feedback from the audience after responding in an unsatisfactory manner to one of Nepal's highly respected actors. She later accused Subedi for asking her questions which would trigger her to respond in such a way; she also claimed that he asked her such questions with the purpose of vilifying her. When things got out of hand and gained enormous public attention, Subedi requested the audience to put an end to their outrage towards Niraula.
