= Hami Tin Bhai =

2004 Nepali film

Hami Tin Bhai - हामी तिन भाई
- Hami Tin Bhai Poster
- Directed by: Shiva Regmi
- Screenplay by: Shiva Regmi
- Story by: Shiva Regmi
- Produced by: Basanta Kumar Shrestha; Ramesh Twayana
- Starring: Rajesh Hamal; Shri Krishna Shrestha; Nikhil Upreti; Jharana Thapa; Rekha Thapa; Nandita KC; Rabi Giri; Bhaskar Parajuli; Dipika paudel
- Cinematography: Sambhu Sapkota
- Music by: Sambhujeet Baskota
- Production company: Jaya Bahari Films
- Release date: 13 October 2004
- Running time: 150 minutes
- Country: Nepal
- Language: Nepali
- Budget: est.रू60 lakh (US$39,000)
- Box office: est.रू1.6 crore (US$100,000)

Hami Tin Bhai (also Haami Teen Bhai) (Nepali: हामी तीन भाई, English: We Three Brothers) is a 2004 Nepali action comedy film directed by Shiva Regmi. The film features three of biggest superstars of the late 1990s and 2000s era- Rajesh Hamal, Shree Krishna Shrestha and Nikhil Upreti in the lead roles supported by Rekha Thapa, Jharana Thapa, Nandita KC, Keshab Bhattrai, Sushila Rayamajhi, Ravi Giri etc. The movie praised by critics with many critics highlighting its screenplay, music, comedy and the actors' performance especially of its lead actors but over the top action scenes were heavily criticized. The movie broke all the records at the records at the box office and was recorded as an "All Time Blockbuster" at the box office and is one of the highest-grossing films in Nepali film history. It is considered a classic movie by fans.

== Plot ==
Hari (Rajesh Hamal) is an orphan boy who earns his living by stealing shoes in temples and reselling them and begging. He meets two orphan boys, Ram and Laxman he adopts them as his brothers as he feels sorry for them. To ensure that Ram and Laxman receive a good education, he leaves his life of crime and works honestly.

After few years, all three brothers are grown up. But it was found laxman was son of rich businessman who was murdered by group of bandits. Now, the wife of rich man i.e. laxman's mother requests laxman to come back home. He refuses at first but lastly he agrees and he is taken to his real mother. He now starts living a life of businessman but there he founds that bandits who killed his father are now trying to kill him and his mother as well to take away all the property. So he seeks help from his past brothers: Hari and Ram. They jointly fight those bandits and started to live happy family again in laxman's house.

== Cast ==
- Rajesh Hamal as Hari
- Shree Krishna Shrestha as Ram
- Nikhil Upreti as Laxman
- Jharana Thapa as Pooja
- Rekha Thapa as Maiya
- Sushila Rayamajhi as Laxman's Mother
- Nandita Kc as Asmi
- Sunil Dutt as JK
- Sushil Pokhrel as JK father
- Rabi Giri as Pooja father
- Salon Basnet as young Hari
- Dinesh as Gapal
- Manga as Depak
- Prakash Subedi as Doctor
