= Sunthan =

Place in Bagmati Province, Nepal

Coordinates: 27°35′N 85°32′E

Sunthan सुनथान
- Interactive map of Sunthan
- Country: Nepal
- Province: Bagmati Province
- District: Kabhrepalanchok District
- Municipality: Panauti Municipality
- Municipality, Ward Number: Panauti Municipality, Ward Number 10
- Time zone: UTC+5:45 (Nepal Time)

Sunthan is a village in Kavrepalanchowk District of Nepal.

== People ==
Chettris especially KCs

== Crops ==
Maize, Potato, Wheat, Rice, Orange
