= The World's Happiest Man =

- Official poster
- Directed by: Binod Poudel
- Written by: Binod Poudel
- Produced by: Rajendra Thakurathi; Amitabh Joshi; Kirtana Banskota; Abeeral Thapa
- Starring: Bruce Dern
- Release date: April 25, 2025 (Nepal)
- Running time: 102 minutes
- Countries: United States; Nepal
- Languages: English; Nepali; Dzongkha

The World's Happiest Man is a 2025 American-Nepalese drama film written and directed by Binod Poudel and starring Dayahang Rai, Hari Bansha Acharya and Bruce Dern.

== Cast ==
- Bruce Dern
- Dayahang Rai
- Hari Bansha Acharya
- Pooja Chand-Lama
- Richa Ghimire
- Joss Pandey
- Tom Crain
- Aditi Pyakurel

== Production ==
In January 2024, it was announced that Dern, Rai and Acharya were cast in the film and that filming occurred in Akron, Ohio.

As per report, the film has entered its final stage of post-production.

== Release ==
The film was released in Nepal on April 25, 2025.

== Reception ==
Sanskriti Pokharel of The Kathmandu Post gave the film a mixed to positive review, writing “All the characters in the movie deserve 10/10 for their performances.(…)Moreover, due to its nonlinear narrative style, the movie might be incomprehensible and too bizarre for some audiences.”

Sudiksha Tuladhar of the Nepali Times gave the film a negative review and wrote, “Scenes shift quickly throughout making the story difficult to follow at times. The use of symbolism is a trite overdone.”
