= Information Technology Park, Nepal =

Information Technology Park
- सूचना प्रविधि पार्क
- Interactive map of the Information Technology Park area

General information
- Type: Information Technology Park
- Location: Kavrepalanchowk, Nepal
- Coordinates: 27.617222°N 85.526944°E

The Information Technology Park (commonly known as Info Tech Park or IT Park), Nepal's only Information Technology Park, is situated between Banepa and Panauti of Kavrepalanchowk District, Nepal, although it comes under Panauti Municipality. It lies about 28 kilometres (17 mi) northeast of the capital city Kathmandu.

== History ==
The Information Technology Park was completed in April 2003 with a total investment of NRs. 270 million (~ 2 million USD). The initiation of the Park was formally done by an American company IBM but it left after nine months. Javra Software Company from the Netherlands had also started work but it too left, stating technical reasons and shifted to Kathmandu. By July 2014, it has not come into operation, as a result of which the Government of Nepal is missing millions of rupees in revenue. The government has formed a department named the Department of Information Technology for the socio-economic transformation to form a developed country.

== Aims and objectives ==
The IT Park was established under the Ministry of Industry, for the development and promotion of information technology and services in the country. It has been said to be providing employment opportunities to about 15,000 technicians after the full range of operations of the IT Park. It has aimed to provide government services by maximizing the use of information and technology.

== Land and distribution ==
The Park has been distributed within the area of 235 Ropanis (12 hectares (120,000 m^{2})) consisting of a commercial building, an administrative building, four residential buildings and a security building built by investing NRs. 500 million (~ 4 million USD).
