= Indreswor =

Indreshwar इन्द्रेश्वर
- Village development committee
- Country: Nepal
- Province: Bagmati Province
- District: Kabhrepalanchok District

Population (1991)
  - Total: 3,878
- Time zone: UTC+5:45 (Nepal Time)

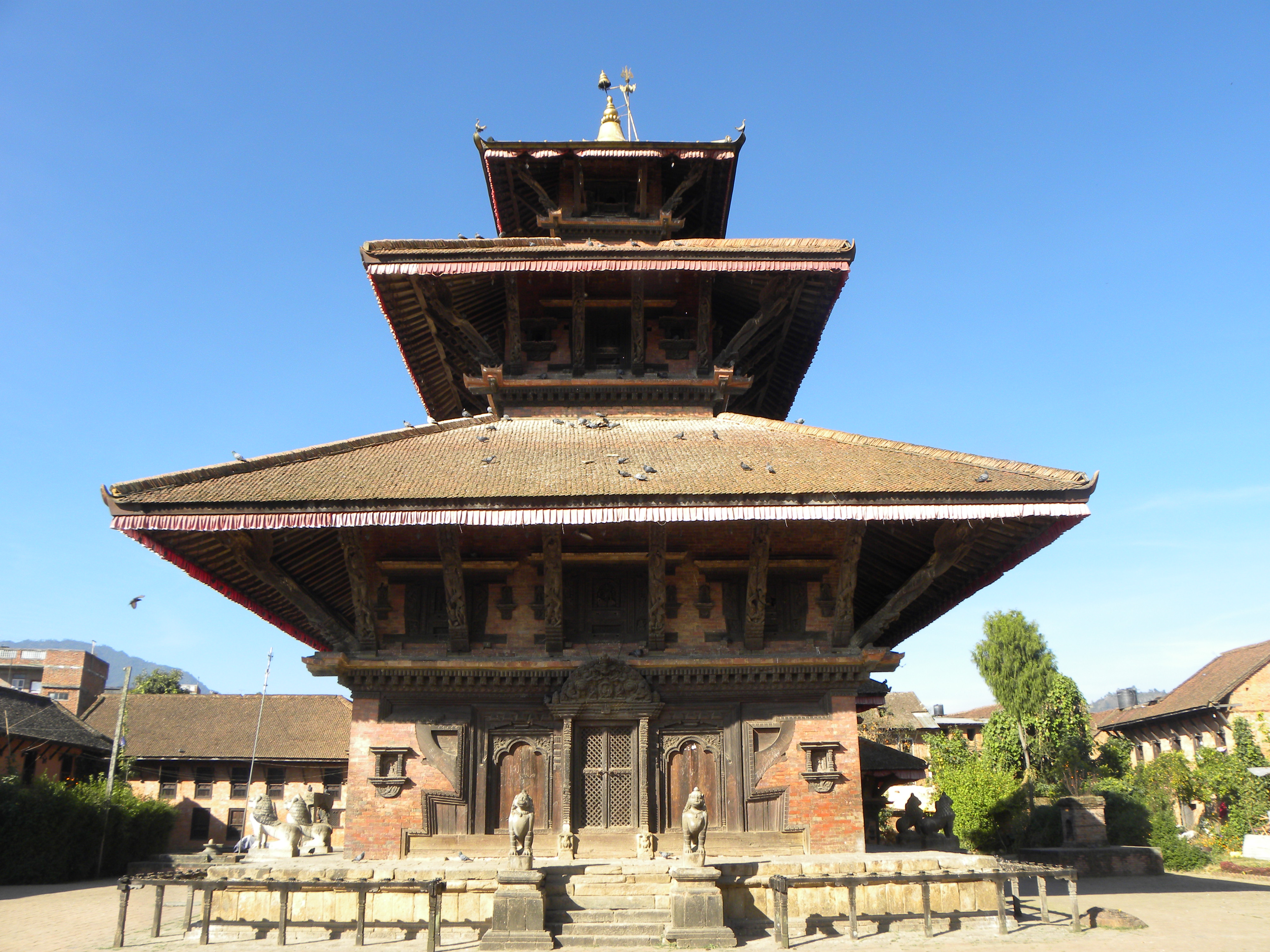

Indreshwar is a village development committee in Kabhrepalanchok District in Bagmati Province of central Nepal. At the time of the 1991 Nepal census it had a population of 3,878 and had 659 houses in it.

Nepali Hindu legend suggests that the king of the heavens, Indra seduced Ahalya, the wife of the sage Gautama. It is said that Ahalya was converted into a stone, which is now at the north eastern corner of the temple's platform. The temple whose history could date back to the early Tribal Kirata age in the 6th century became the shrine for Indra, the Rain God in Hinduism in the 13th century when a princess from Banepa named Viramadevi established the Indrakuta. This has been mentioned in the Gopalarajavamshali, a 16th-century chronicle. The temple stands at the south eastern portion of the town of Panauti. This spot is also situated at the confluence of the Rosi and Punyamati rivers.

== Gallery ==
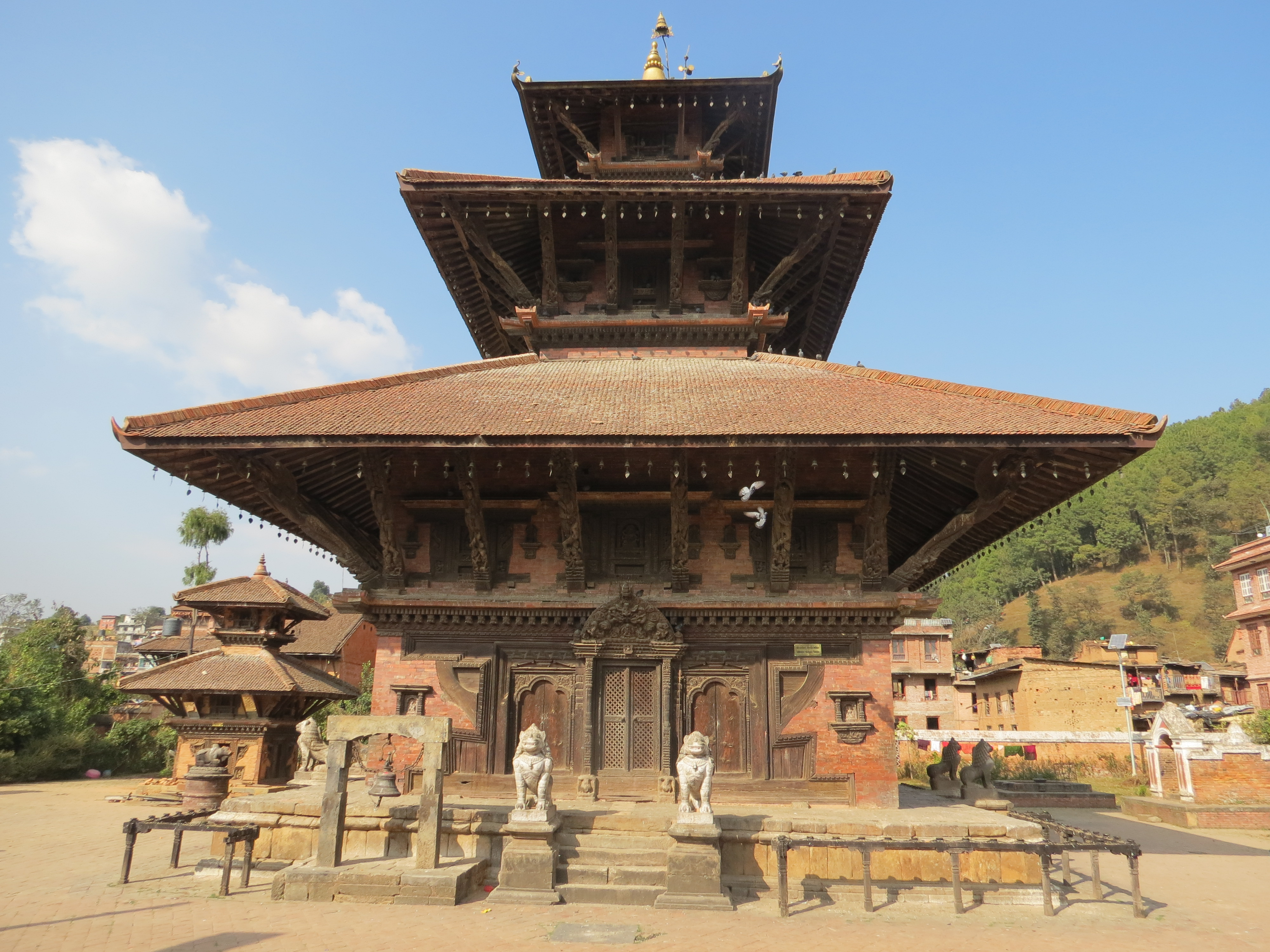
Indreswor Temple

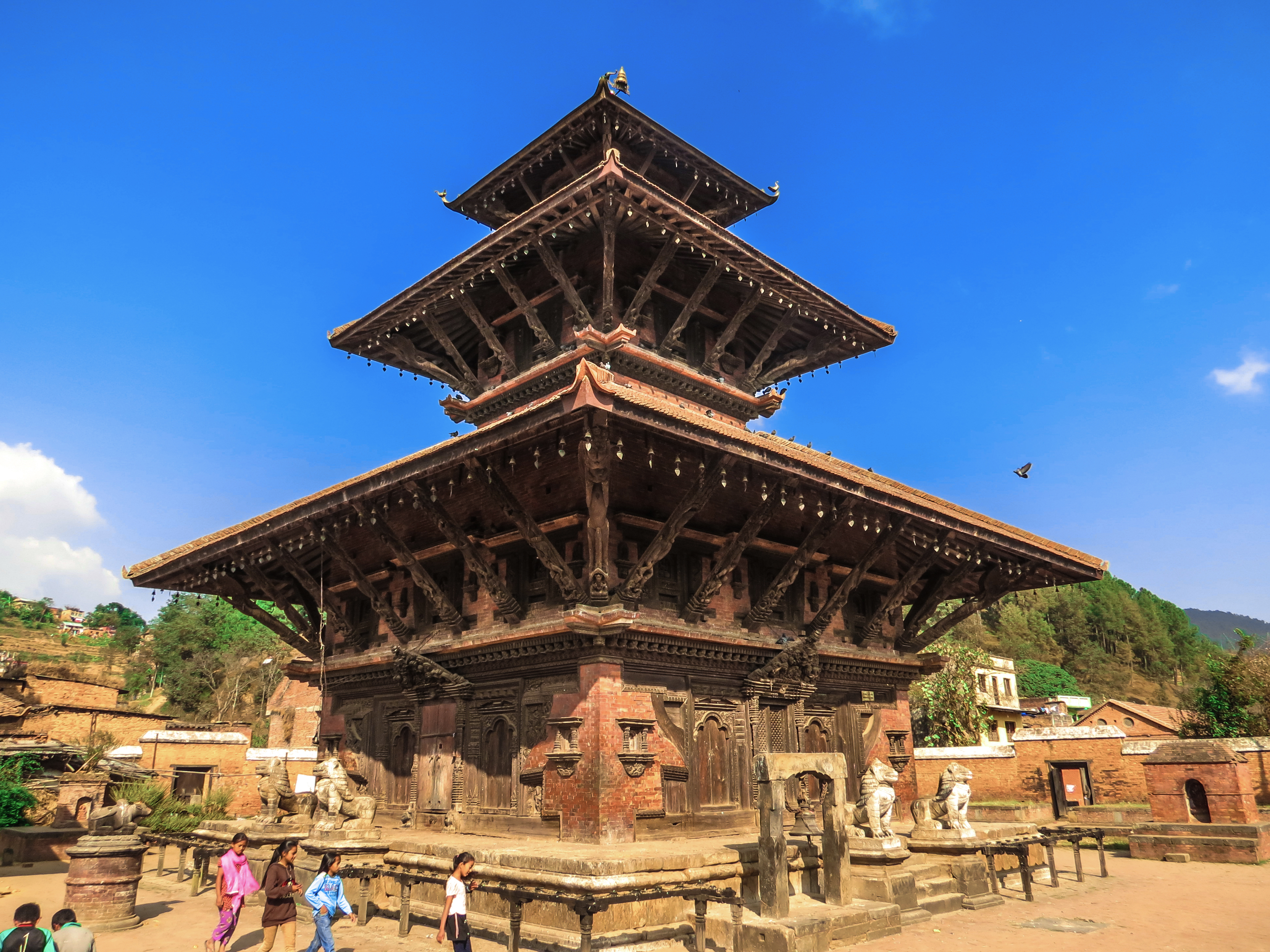
Another side of Indreswor Temple

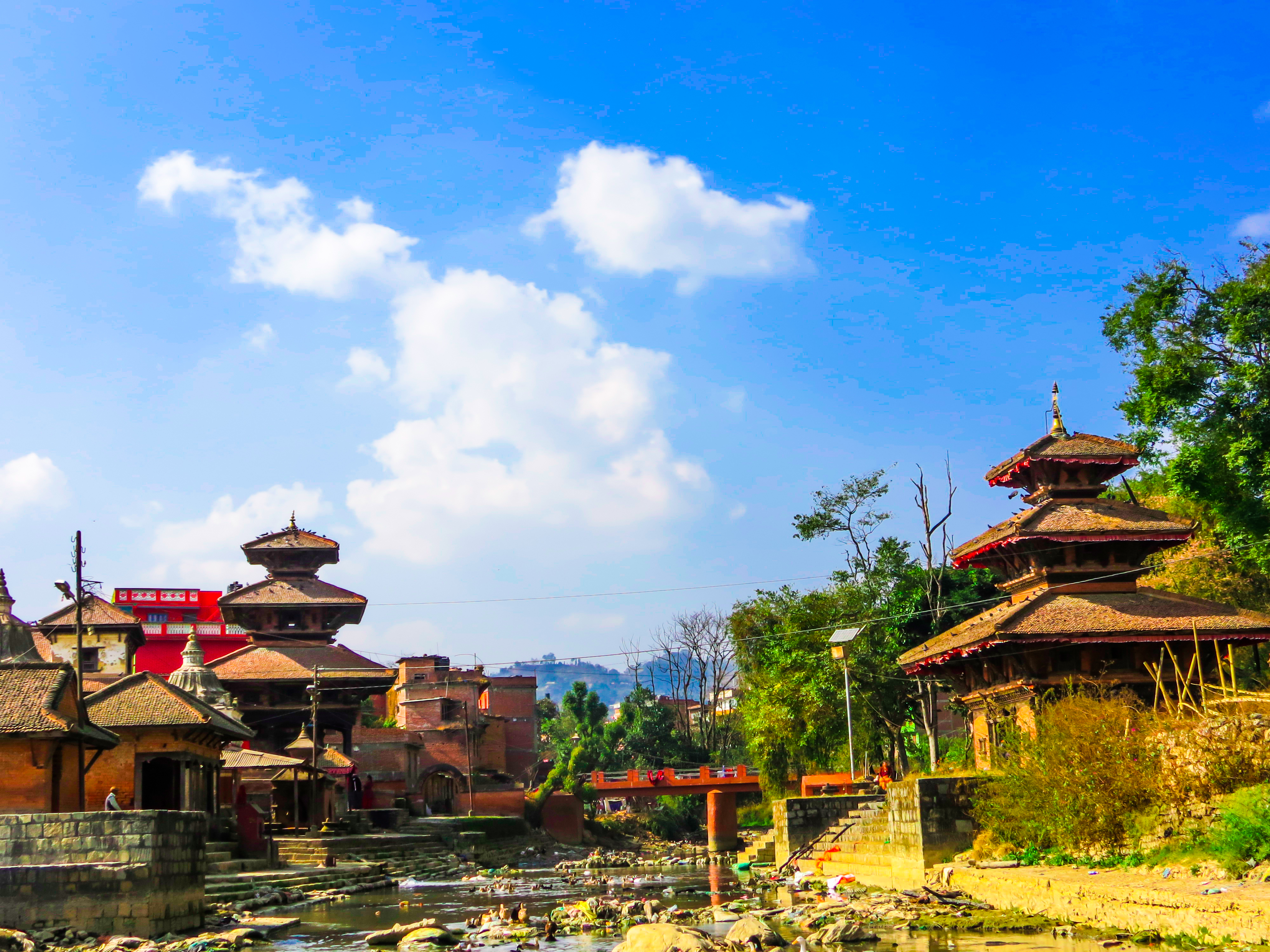
Indreswor Mahadev Panauti

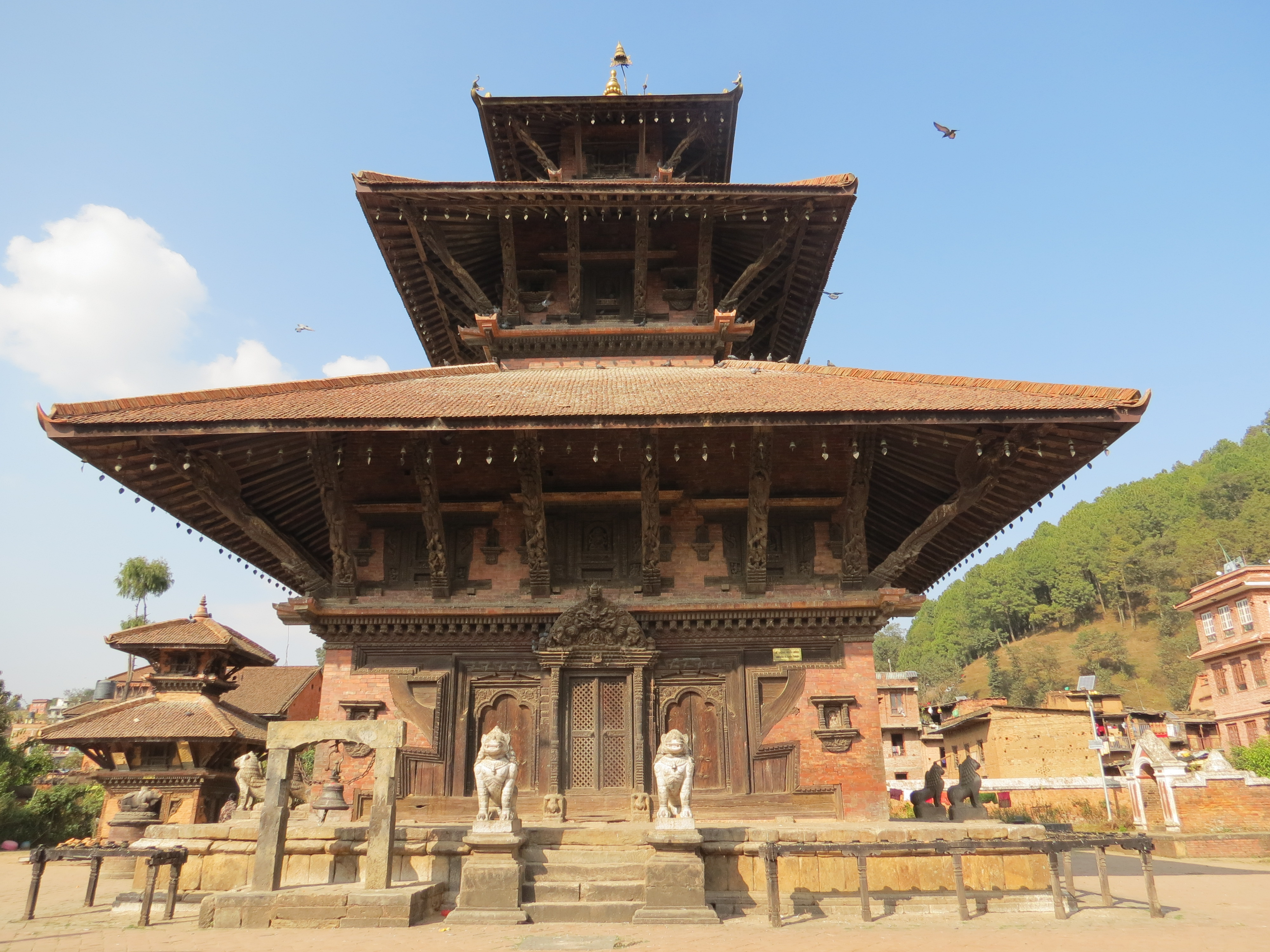

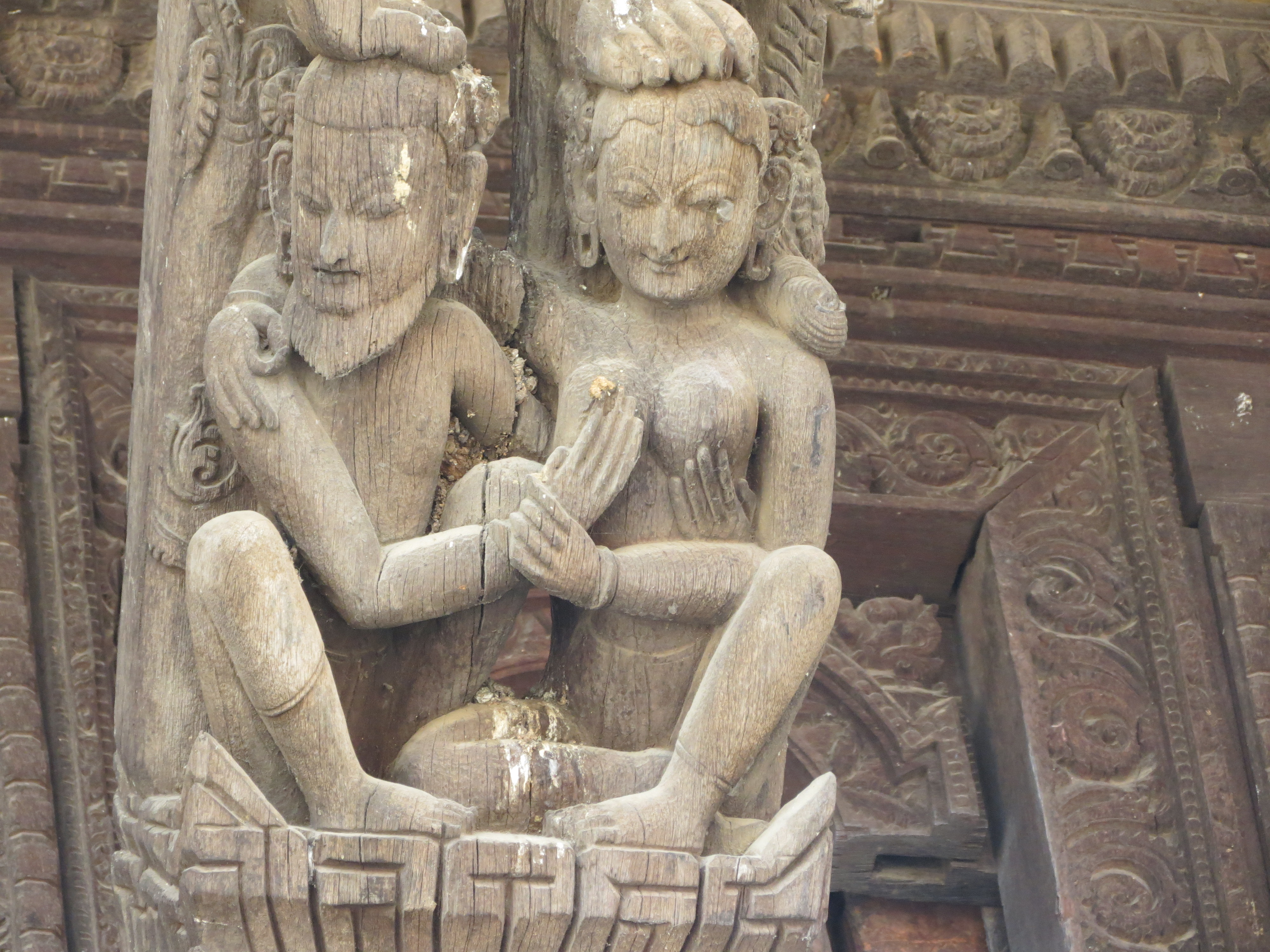

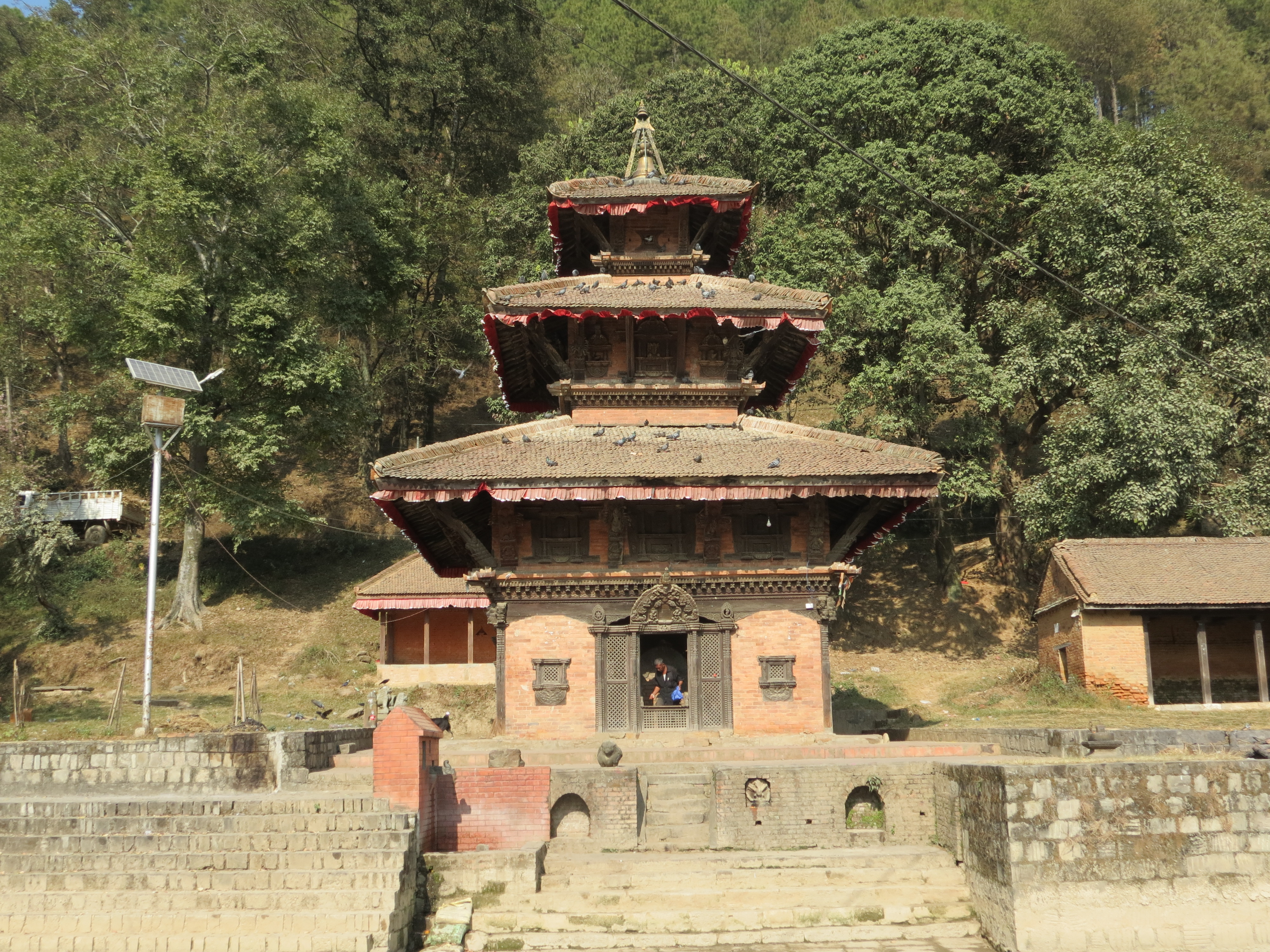
Inrdreswor
