= Desh Dekhi Bidesh =

- Theatrical poster of Desh Dekhi Bidesh
- Directed by: Narendra Thapa
- Written by: Dayaram Pandey; Badri Pangeni
- Story by: Subash Singh Basnet
- Produced by: Ramita Thapa
- Starring: Nikhil Upreti; Dilip Rayamajhi; Richa Ghimire; Prerana Sharma; Gopal Dhakal; Daman Rupakheti
- Edited by: Banish Shah Promo editing = Man Bahadur Thapa
- Music by: Sambhujeet Baskota
- Distributed by: Arun Regmi; Jitendra Thapa
- Release date: 2008
- Running time: 135 minutes
- Country: Nepal
- Language: Nepali

Desh Dekhi Bidesh (Nepali:देश देखि बीदेश), shortened as DDB, is a movie made in Nepal which was released in 2008. It was directed by Narendra Thapa, with a script by Subash Singh Basnet and starring Nikhil Upreti and Prerana Sharma in the lead roles, and with Dilip Rayamajhi, Richa Ghimire, Daman Rupakheti, Anju Lama, Nirajan Sigdel, and others. In addition to being shot in Nepal, many parts of the film were shot in other countries.

== Plot ==
This Nepali movie is about all those who live in Nepal – who were forced to leave home to work on foreign soil or in a different region, like Deepak (Nikhil Upreti) in this movie who has to leave his country for a job to make money to live.

== Cast ==
- Nikhil Upreti as Deepak
- Dilip Rayamajhi
- Richa Ghimire as Pooja
- Prerana Sharma as Rita
- Daman Rupakheti as Jhamke
- Gopal Dhakal

== Music ==
The music of Desh Dekhi Bidesh was released in 2008. The album features music by composer Sambhujeet Baskota.

=== Tracks ===
The album consists of the following tracks:

Tracklist
No.	Title	Length
1.	"Kati Paryo Mausam Chha"	2:10
2.	"Sarai Ramro Roop"	2:47
3.	"Tie ra suit layera aakka chau"	6:01
4.	"Yesh pali ta Bidesh mai bitne bho Dashain tihar"	5:56
