= Rayale Bihabar =

Rayale रयाले
- Ward
- Location in Nepal
- Coordinates: 27.59°N 85.45°E
- Country: Nepal
- Province: Bagmati Province
- District: Kavrepalanchok District
- Municipality: Panauti Municipality

Population (1991)
  - Total: 4,117
- Time zone: UTC+5:45 (Nepal Time)

Rayale (Nepali: रयाले) is a village in the Panauti municipality (ward 1) of the Kavrepalanchok district, Bagmati Province. Previously, it was a village development committee in Kavrepalanchok district in the Bagmati Zone of central Nepal. At the time of the 1991 Nepal census it had a population of 4,117 in 772 individual households.
