= Richa Ghimire =

Nepalese actress

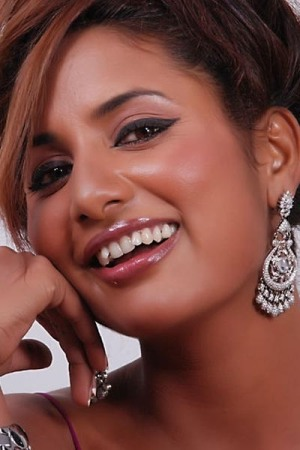
- Occupation: Actress

Richa Ghimire (Nepali: ऋचा घिमिरे) is a Nepalese former actress. She has starred in more than 18 feature films.

== Career ==
Richa Ghimire has appeared in more than 18 films. She considers Bish (2009) to be her most challenging role, in the film she plays the role of a drug addict; Ghimire revealed that she had studied about people who do drugs. Furthermore, she watched 1998 American biographical drama Gia, and she pierced her nose, used contact lenses, and had hair and nail extensions to prepare for the role.

== Personal life ==
Ghimire is married to director Shankar Ghimire since 12 December 2009. They spent their honeymoon in London, England. Apart from acting, Ghimire advocates for equal pay for equal work, she said that "female actors aren't only paid less than male actors for same amount of work in a film, but that they also earn less when they have larger parts than male actors". She lives in United States with her husband. They have three children.

== Selected filmography ==
- Love in Nepal (2004)
- Desh Dekhi Bidesh (2008)
- The World's Happiest Man (TBA)
