= Kohinoor (2014 film) =

Nepalese action drama film

- Theatrical release poster
- कोहिनूर
- Directed by: Aakash Adhikari
- Written by: Aakash Adhikari
- Produced by: Shankar Shrestha; Shweta Khadka
- Starring: Shree Krishna Shrestha; Shweta Khadka; Mithila Sharma
- Cinematography: Raju Bikram Thapa
- Edited by: Banish Shah
- Music by: Shambhujeet Baskota
- Production company: Nepa Movies
- Release date: August 8, 2014
- Running time: 2 hours 18 minutes
- Country: Nepal
- Language: Nepali
- Budget: est.रू0.75 crore
- Box office: est.रू14.75 crore

Kohinoor (Nepali: कोहिनूर, transl. Diamond) is a 2014 Nepali action-drama film written and directed by Aakash Adhikari. It was produced by Shankar Shrestha, Chandra Prasad Shrestha, Shambhu Shrestha and Shweta Khadka under the banner of Nepa Movies Pvt. Ltd. The film features an ensemble cast including Late Shree Krishna Shrestha, Shweta Khadka, Mithila Sharma and Samrat Sapkota. The movie tells the story of a man who finds himself entangled in criminal underworld dealings while trying to stand up for justice and love.

The film met with positive response from critics and audience with praise directed towards performance of lead actors, story, music and direction. Kohinoor was released just two days before the tragic death of its lead actor and producer, Shree Krishna Shrestha, on 10 August 2014 in India due to pneumonia and bone cancer.

The film went on to become a national phenomenon, with people flocking to theatres in large numbers both to watch his final performance and to pay tribute to the late star. The emotional weight surrounding his passing, combined with the film’s strong storytelling, led to unprecedented box office success. The film released with an overwhelming response from the audiences as it witnessed an unprecedented success at the Nepal box office. Kohinoor broke several records at the box office as it became the first ever film in the history of Nepali cinema to cross रू10 crore at the box office and became the highest grossing film of all time in Nepal until its record was broken by Chhakka Panja in 2016.

Over the years, it has achieved a cult status and is regarded as one of the best Nepali films ever made and its song "Yespali ko Tiharai ramailo" is still a top choice of Nepalese functions and celebrations especially Tihar.

== Plot ==
Abhishek Kharel, affectionately known as Babu (portrayed by Shree Krishna Shrestha), is a principled and courageous man residing in Nepal. His life takes a significant turn when he heroically saves a police officer from a criminal named Tiger. This act of bravery catches the attention of a government minister, who offers Abhishek a position at a manpower company. The company, under the leadership of Deepak, ostensibly facilitates employment opportunities abroad for Nepali youth.

As Abhishek immerses himself in his new role, he becomes involved in the process of sending young Nepali women to Israel for work. Unbeknownst to him, the company is a facade for a human trafficking operation. The women are deceitfully transported to India and sold into prostitution.

During a business trip to India, Abhishek meets Rathod, an associate who introduces him to the underbelly of the trafficking network. It is here that Abhishek encounters Kohinoor (played by Sweta Khadka), a young woman ensnared in the sex trade. Kohinoor harbors deep resentment towards the individual responsible for her plight—a man named Abhishek from the manpower company—unaware that the very person she despises is standing before her.

Overwhelmed with guilt upon realizing his inadvertent role in Kohinoor's suffering, Abhishek devises a plan to rescue her. Employing cunning and determination, he successfully extricates Kohinoor from the brothel. The duo flees to Goa, seeking refuge and a path back to Nepal.

As they journey together, a bond forms between them, blossoming into love. However, Abhishek grapples with the moral dilemma of revealing his true identity to Kohinoor. The narrative delves into whether Kohinoor will uncover the truth about Abhishek's involvement in her past and whether their love can withstand the revelations and challenges that lie ahead..

== Cast ==
- Shree Krishna Shrestha as Abhishek Kharel (Babu)
- Shweta Khadka as Kohinoor
- Mithila Sharma as Abhishek's mother
- Samrat Sapkota
- Mukunda Shrestha
- Sunil Katwal
- Ramesh Adhikari

== Reception ==
The film was released on August 8, 2014. Shrestha couldn't attend the premier of his film as he and his wife Shweta Khadka travelled to India shortly after their marriage, where his health began to decline. He was diagnosed with pneumonia and bone cancer. He died at the age of 47 in Sir Ganga Ram Hospital, New Delhi. After his demise, the film received overwhelming affection from the Nepali audience as they flocked into the theatres across the country to witness the legendary actor one last time in the big screen. Audience also connected with the story of girl trafficking as the film received positive responses from everyone.

== Box office ==
The film was a tsunami at the box office as it became the first ever film in Nepal to achieve रू10 crore (100 million) landmark, which was unthinkable at that time. It broke all the previous records and became a monstrous blockbuster. Nepali audience showered their gratitude towards the actor as It saw an unprecedented footfalls across the country. The film was honored by Film Development Board of Nepal in 2025 during which its lifetime gross was revealed to be रू14.75 crore.
