= Kalati Bhumidanda =

Kalati Bhumidanda कलाटी भूमिडाँडा
- Village development committee
- Location in Nepal
- Coordinates: 27.55°N 85.45°E
- Country: Nepal
- Zone: Bagmati Zone
- District: Kabhrepalanchok District

Population (1991)
  - Total: 3,801
- Time zone: UTC+5:45 (Nepal Time)

Kalati Bhumidanda is a town and municipality in Kabhrepalanchok District in the Bagmati Zone of central Nepal. At the time of the 1991 Nepal census it had a population of 3,801.
