= Harke Haldar =

Nepalese tele serial

- Nepali: हर्के हल्दार
- Genre: Comedy; Drama
- Written by: Sailendra Simkhada
- Directed by: Indra Dong Lama
- Creative director: Manoj Khadka
- Opening theme: "Harke Haldar"
- Composer: (team of the show)
- Country of origin: Nepal
- Original language: Nepali
- No. of episodes: 738

Production
- Production location: Nepal
- Cinematography: Deepak Basnet
- Editor: Rabindra Khadka
- Running time: 45 minutes
- Production company: Kantipur Television Network

Original release
- Network: KTV
- Release: 2011 – present

Harke Haldar is a weekly comedy serial on Kantipur Television from one of the rural village of Nepal, where the story revolves around the main character. Hawaldar (Harke ) along with his troublesome neighbors.

== Cast of Harke Haldar ==
- Sabeen Niraula .. Pandit Baje
- Bishnu Sapkota ... Harke Haldar and Lahure
- Indra Dong Lama ... Khambe
- Roshani Sapkota .. Batul
- Saru Dahal ... Deuti

== Crew of Harke Haldar ==
- Cinematography : Dipak Basnet
- Editor: Rabindra Khadka

== Related links ==
- Kantipur Television
