= Nikhil Upreti =

Nepalese actor and film director

Nikhil Uprety निखिल उप्रेती
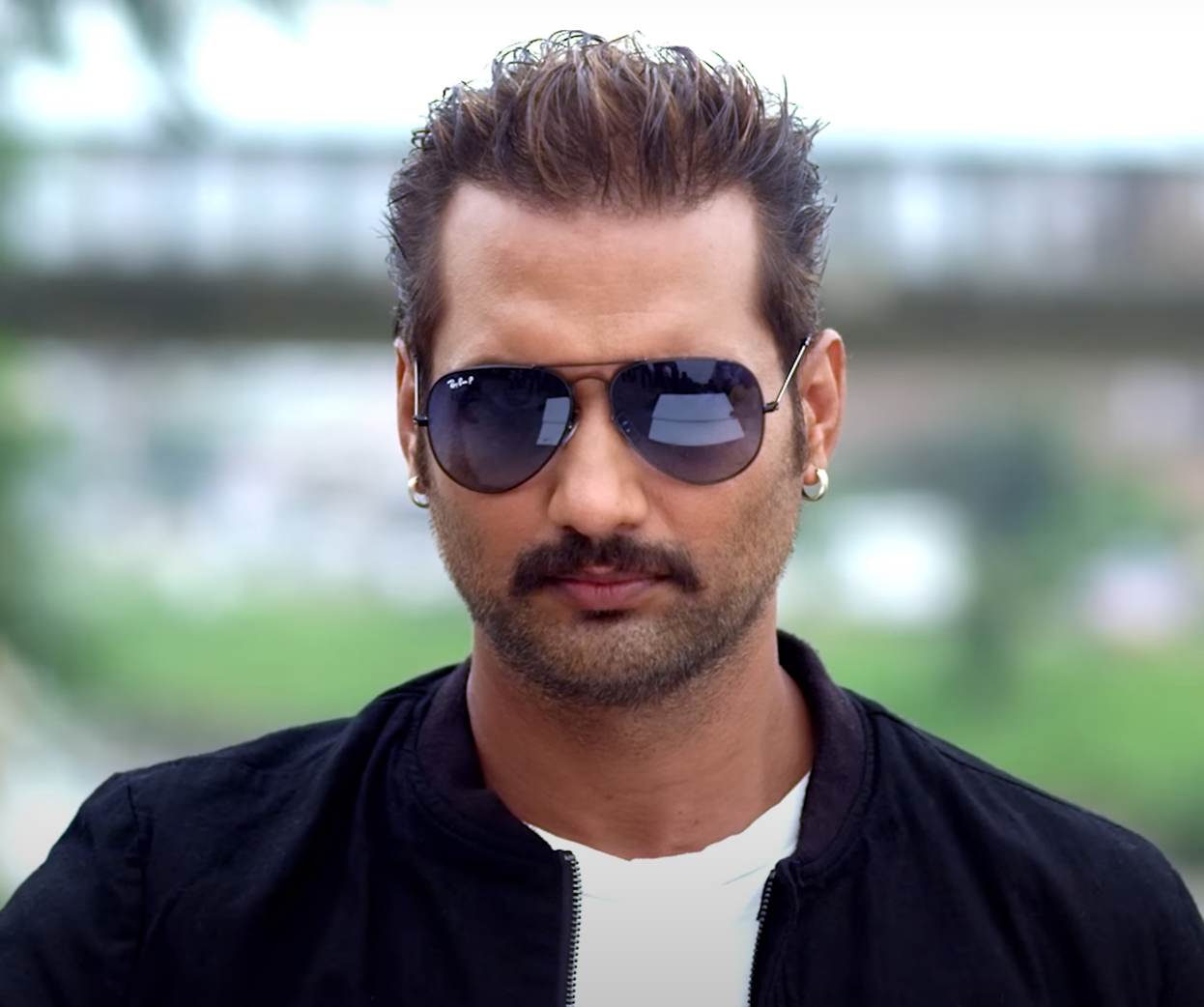
- Upreti in 2016
- Born: Dinesh Upreti; August 10, 1974 (age 52); Sarlahi
- Other names: Action Star; Nikhil dai
- Education: Undergraduate
- Occupations: Actor, producer, director, stunt man
- Years active: 2000–present
- Spouse: Kopila Upreti (divorced) Sanchita Luitel (2009–present)
- Children: 3
- Awards: National Films Award (2005); Rastriya Nagarik Swarna Samman (2006)

Nikhil Upreti (Nepali: निखिल उप्रेती) is a Nepalese actor, director, producer, and martial artist who appears primarily in Nepali-language films. He is known for his roles in action and social drama genres. Upreti has performed his own stunts in several films and was one of the highest-paid actors in the Nepali film industry during the peak of his career.

== Career ==
Upreti made his debut with the action thriller Pinjada, released in 2000. In the film, he jumped from the seven-story building of Kantipur Publication in Kathmandu, Nepal, without any protection or body double, which became a huge topic of discussion at the time. Since then, he has starred in some of the highest-grossing movies in Nepalese cinema history like Shiva Shakti, Agnipath, Dhadkan, Papi Manche and its sequel Papi Manchhe 2, Abhimanyu, Hami Tin Bhai, Nikhil Dai, Savdhan, and Dag"samjhana""arabpati. His movies Papi Manchhe and Hami Tin Bhai have also held the record of being the highest-grossing movies in Nepali cinema history; the latter also won him the National Film Award for Best Actor. After a 5–6 year absence from Nepali film, he made a comeback to the Nepalese film industry with 'Bhairav' in 2015, which went on to become one of the highest-grossing Nepali films of the year. He was also awarded the Rastriya Nagarik Swarna Samman in 2006.

== Filmography ==
| Year | Title | Role(s) | Notes | Ref(s) |
|---|---|---|---|---|
| 2000 | Pinjada | | Debut film | |
| 2002 | Shibashakti | | | |
| 2003 | Kurukshetra | | | |
| 2003 | Agnipath | | | |
| 2004 | Ram Laxman | Laxman | | |
| 2004 | Santaan | | | |
| 2004 | Mayako Jaal | | | |
| 2004 | Kartavya | | | |
| 2004 | Karma Yoddha | | | |
| 2004 | Hami Tin Bhai | Laxman | | |
| 2005 | Bhai-Bhai | | | |
| 2005 | Feri Arko Saino | | | |
| 2005 | Papi Maanche | | | |
| 2005 | Bhagya | | | |
| 2005 | Barmala | | | |
| 2005 | Abhimanyu | DSP Abhimanyu | | |
| 2006 | Dhadkan | Nikhil | | |
| 2006 | A Pandit Baje | | | |
| 2006 | Savdhaan | | | |
| 2006 | Krodh | Karan/ Bhola | | |
| 2006 | Manish | Vishnu | | |
| 2006 | Krishna Arjun | Arjun | | |
| 2007 | Sajnwa Anadi Sajania Khiladi | | | |
| 2007 | Nikhil Dai | Nikhil | | |
| 2007 | Yuddha | | | |
| 2007 | Chor Shipahi | | | |
| 2007 | Barudh | | | |
| 2007 | Carrang Gang1and2 | | | |
| 2007 | Bhagya Bidhata | | | |
| 2007 | Karan-Arjun | Arjun | | |
| 2007 | Haami Saathi Bhai | | | |
| 2007 | Agni Jwala | Agni | | |
| 2007 | krishnaa | | | |
| 2007 | Aama Ko Kaakh | | | |
| 2007 | Duniya | | | |
| 2007 | Jeevan Mrithu | | | |
| 2007 | Parkhi Base | | | |
| 2008 | Pale Dai | | | |
| 2008 | Khalnaayak | | | |
| 2008 | Trinetra | | | |
| 2008 | Bish | | | |
| 2008 | Papi Manchhe 2 | | | |
| 2008 | Maryada | | | |
| 2008 | Dobato | Raj | | |
| 2008 | Desh Dekhi Bidesh | Deepak | | |
| 2008 | Dai Ko Sasurali | | | |
| 2008 | Janma-Mrithu | | | |
| 2008 | Samjhanaa | | | |
| 2008 | Insaf | | | |
| 2008 | Ram-Balaram | | | |
| 2008 | Jindagi | | | |
| 2008 | Jaya Shiba Shankar | | | |
| 2009 | Trishul | | | |
| 2009 | Khalnayak | | | |
| 2009 | Nisana | | | |
| 2009 | Dosti | | | |
| 2009 | Halchal | | | |
| 2009 | Mission Paisa | | | |
| 2009 | Mr. Don | | | |
| 2009 | Dharma | | | |
| 2009 | Pahilo Pahilo Maya | | | |
| 2009 | Jay Shiva Shankar | | | |
| 2009 | Bish | | | |
| 2009 | Maya Ta Maya Ho | | | |
| 2009 | Bidai | | | |
| 2010 | Ghayal | | | |
| 2010 | The Flash Back: Farkera Herda | | | |
| 2010 | Balwan | | | |
| 2010 | Mero Ke Gati Hune Ho | | | |
| 2010 | Bhul Bhaye Maaf Gara | | | |
| 2010 | Desh | | | |
| 2010 | Bidaai | | | |
| 2010 | Ram Balram | Balram | | |
| 2010 | Kaslai Diu Yo Jowan | | | |
| 2012 | Parichaya | | | |
| 2012 | Debyani | | | |
| 2012 | Timi Jaha Vaye Pani | | | |
| 2013 | Daag | | | |
| 2013 | Samjhana | | | |
| 2015 | Bhairav | Bhairav | Also his debut as a writer and director | |
| 2015 | Lootera | | | |
| 2016 | King | | | |
| 2017 | Nirbhay | | | |
| 2017 | Radhe | Radhe | | |
| 2017 | Rudra | | | |
| 2017 | Sanrakshan | | | |
| 2018 | Timi Sanga | | Special appearance | |
| 2018 | Pinjada Back Again | | | |
| 2019 | Villan | | | |
| 2019 | Commitment 60 Hours | | | |
| 2026 | Acharya | | | |

== Awards ==
| SN | Award Title | Film Name / Project | Year | Result |
|---|---|---|---|---|
| 1 | Best Actor (National Film Award) | Hami Tin Bhai | 2004 (2061 BS) | Won |
| 2 | Rastriya Nagarik Swarna Samman | Contribution to Nepalese Cinema | 2006 | Won |
| 3 | Special Award (Dcine Award) | Bhairav | 2016 (2073 BS) | Won |
| 4 | Special Award (Box Office Film Award) | Career Achievement | 2017 | Won |
| 5 | Best Actor in a Leading Role (Kamana Film Award) | Villain | 2019 (2076 BS) | Nominated |
