= Balthali =

Balthali बल्थली
- Village development committee
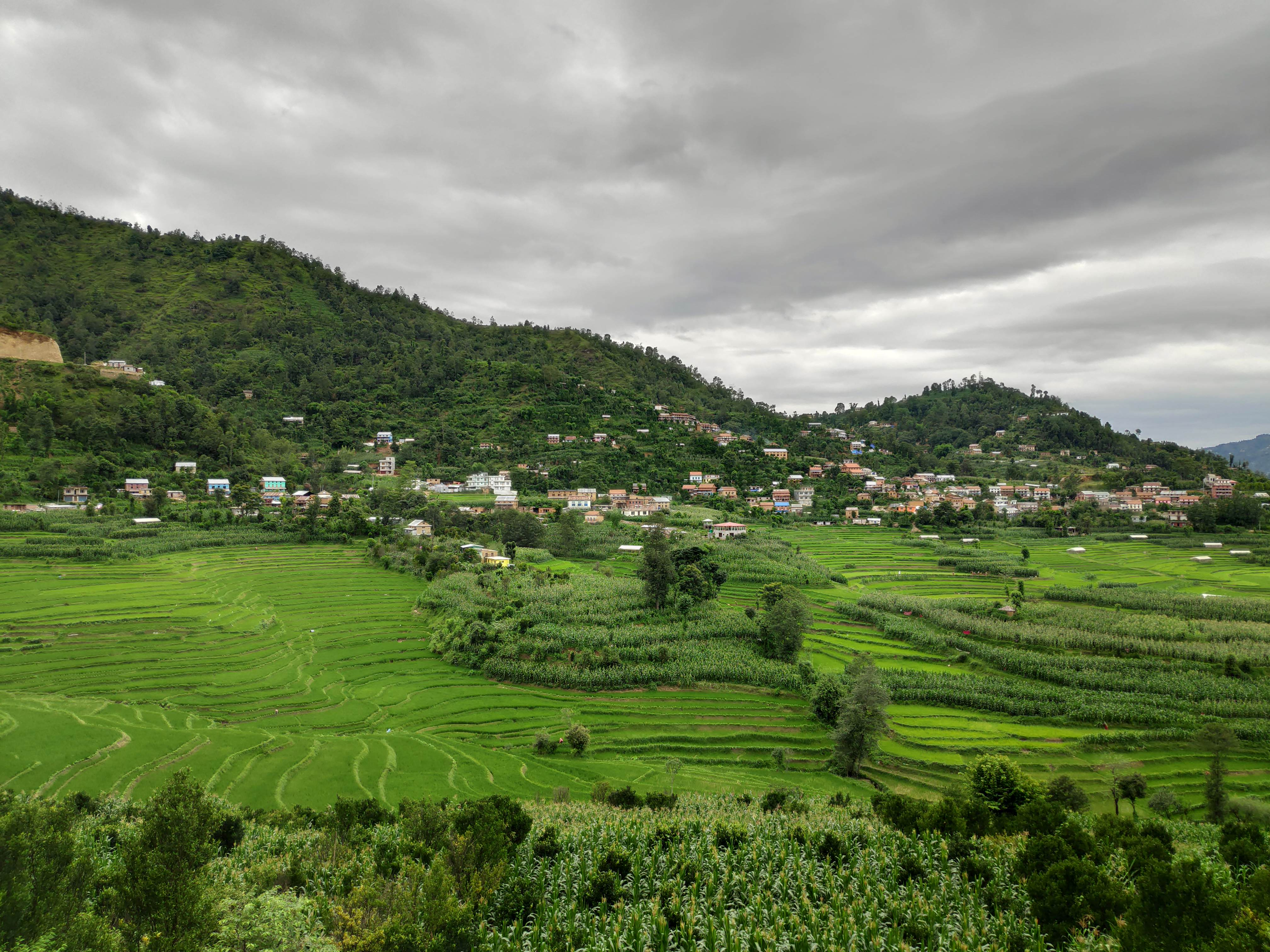
- Landscape of Balthali Village

- Location in Nepal
- Coordinates: 27.54°N 85.54°E
- Country: Nepal
- Province: Bagmati Province
- District: Kavrepalanchok District

Population (1991)
  - Total: 2,473
- Time zone: UTC+5:45 (Nepal Time)

Balthali is a village development committee in Kavrepalanchok District in Bagmati Province of central Nepal. At the time of the 1991 Nepal census it had a population of 2,473 and had 496 houses in it.
