= Subbagaun =

Coordinates: 27°38′N 85°20′E

Subbagaun सुब्बागाउँ
- Village development committee
- Interactive map of Subbagaun
- Country: Nepal
- Zone: Bagmati Zone
- District: Kabhrepalanchok District

Population (1991)
  - Total: 3,885
- Time zone: UTC+5:45 (Nepal Time)

Subbagaun is a village development committee in Kabhrepalanchok District in the Bagmati Zone of central Nepal. At the time of the 1991 Nepal census it had a population of 3885 in 711 individual households.
