= Thoukhal =

Thaukhal थौखल
- Village development committee
- Country: Nepal
- Zone: Bagmati Zone
- District: Kabhrepalanchok District

Population (1991)
  - Total: 2,727
- Time zone: UTC+5:45 (Nepal Time)

Thaukhal is a village development committee in Kabhrepalanchok District in the Bagmati Zone of central Nepal. At the time of the 1991 Nepal census it had a population of 2,727 in 472 individual households.
