= Kushadevi =

Kushadevi कुशादेवी
- Village development committee
- Location in Nepal
- Coordinates: 27.58°N 85.46°E
- Country: Nepal
- Zone: Bagmati Zone
- District: Kabhrepalanchok District

Population (1991)
  - Total: 6,268
- Time zone: UTC+5:45 (Nepal Time)

Kushadevi is a village development committee in Kabhrepalanchok District in the Bagmati Zone of central Nepal. At the time of the 1991 Nepal census it had a population of 6,268 in 1,201 individual households.
