= Sankhupati Chour =

Shankhupati Chaur शंखुपाटी चौर Shankhu
- Village development committee
- Location in Nepal
- Coordinates: 27.575°N 85.56°E
- Country: Nepal
- Zone: Bagmati Zone
- District: Kavrepalanchok District

Population (1991)
  - Total: 3,246
- Time zone: UTC+5:45 (Nepal Time)

Shankhupati chaur is a village development committee in Kavrepalanchok District in the Bagmati Zone of central Nepal. At the time of the 1991 Nepal census it had a population of 3,246 in 585 individual households.

This VDC is famous throughout the country for its orange production.

This VDC was home place of famous Nepali actor and comedian Hari Bansha Acharya.
