= Malpi =

Village development committee in Bagmati Zone, Nepal

Coordinates: 27°35′N 85°30′E

Malpi माल्पी
- Village development committee
- Interactive map of Malpi
- Country: Nepal
- Zone: Bagmati Zone
- District: Kabhrepalanchok District

Population (1991)
  - Total: 3,033
- Time zone: UTC+5:45 (Nepal Time)

Malpi is a village development committee in Kabhrepalanchok District in the Bagmati Zone of central Nepal. At the time of the 1991 Nepal census it had a population of 3,033 in 571 individual households.
