= Shweta Khadka =

Nepalese film actress

- Born: Panauti
- Occupation: Actor
- Spouses: Shree Krishna Shrestha (m. 2014–2014, his death); Bijayendra Singh (m. 2020)

Shweta Khadka (born 5 February 1988) is a Nepalese film actress, producer, politician and entrepreneur known for her work in Nepali cinema.

== Career ==
In 2008, Khadka debuted as an actor in Kaha Bhetiyela opposite Shree Krishna Shrestha. The film was a massive blockbuster at the box office. The film became the highest grossing film of the year and one of the highest grossing films of all time. She starred in Hasideu Ek Phera (2010) opposite Hari Bansa Acharya, Madan Krishna Shrestha and Raj Ballav Koirala; the film was an average success. Her next film, Shreeman Shreemati (2011), opposite Shree Krishna Shrestha and Rekha Thapa, was not commercially successful.

In 2014, she starred in Kohinoor opposite her then-husband Shree Krishna Shrestha. However, he died of pneumonia and bone cancer soon after. Many Nepalese people flocked to the theatre to see their star for one final time on screen. The film broke all records at the box office and became the highest grossing film in the history of Nepalese cinema.

After a four-year break from the film industry, Khadka returned as a producer and actress in Kanchhi (2018). The film co-starred Dayahang Rai and was directed by Aakash Adhikari. The film was a huge commercial success.

== Personal life ==
Khadka was born on 5 February 1988 at Panauti village of Kavrepalanchok District.

On 7 July 2014, Shweta Khadka married her frequent co-star Shree Krishna Shrestha. A month later, on 10 August, he died due to pneumonia and bone cancer at the age of 47.

On 7 December 2020, she married Bijayendra Singh.

== Political life ==
Khadka is a member of the largest and oldest democratic party of Nepal, the Nepali Congress.
