= Shree Krishna Shrestha =

Nepali actor and producer (1967–2014)

- श्रीकृष्ण श्रेष्ठ
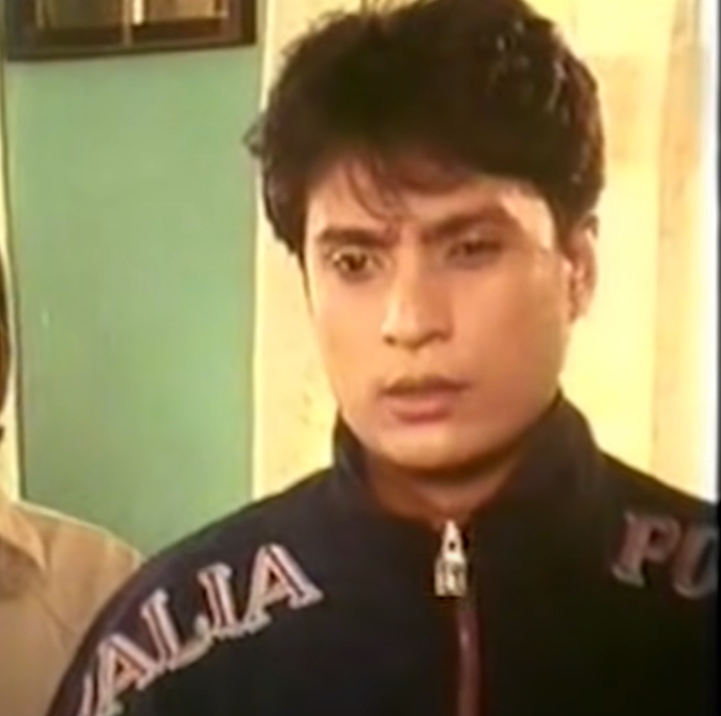
- Shrestha in his film Gorkhali, released in 2000
- Born: Shree Krishna Shrestha; December 30, 1967; Bahrabise, Sindhupalchowk, Nepal
- Died: August 10, 2014 (aged 47); New Delhi, India
- Other name: Abhishek
- Occupations: Actor; producer
- Years active: 1991–2014
- Spouse: Shweta Khadka (m. 2014)

Shree Krishna Shrestha (Nepali: श्रीकृष्ण श्रेष्ठ; April 19, 1967 – August 10, 2014) was a Nepalese actor and producer known for his work in Nepali cinema. He was widely renowned for his talents as an actor, dancer and during his acting career, he was one of the highest paid actors in Nepali cinema.

Shrestha made his acting debut with Bhumari, which became successful at the box office. Then he worked for commercially successful films like Maiti, Bar Pipal, Aafno Manche, Gorkhali, A Mero Hajur, Upakar, Sukha Dukha. In his later years, his movies include Hami Tin Bhai, Kaha Bhetiyela and Kohinoor. His last posthumously released movie was Kohinoor and it broke several records at the box office and was the highest grossing Nepali movie at that time and it was the first Nepali movie to cross over 100 million Nepalese Rupees until the record was broken by Chhakka Panja.

== Personal life ==
Shree Krishna Shrestha married Shweta Khadka in July 2014. They met during the shooting of Kaha Bhetiyela (2008) which was her debut film, which was produced by Shrestha. And since then the two had been in a relationship and they married on July 7, 2014.

== Illness and death ==
Shrestha and his wife Shweta Khadka travelled to India shortly after their marriage, where his health began to decline. He was diagnosed with pneumonia and bone cancer. He died at the age of 47 in Sir Ganga Ram Hospital, New Delhi, on August 10, 2014, at 5am local time. Thousands of people participated in the funeral proceeding in Kathmandu. He was given a national honor by the Nepal Government. Many personalities of Nepal, including the prime minister of Nepal, expressed their deep condolences to him.

== Partial filmography ==
Year	Film	Role	Notes
1989	Bhumari		
1992	Kasam		
1994	Jhajhalko		
1994	Truck Driver		
1995	Jali Rumal		
1995	Rajamati		
1996	Garib		
1996	Nirmaya		
1996	Gothalo		
1997	Guru Chela		
1999	Aafanta		
2000	Gorkhali		
2000	Bar Pipal		
2000	Upakar		
2001	Maiti		
2001	Dharti		
2001	Yestai Huncha Pirati		
2001	Afno Manche		
2002	Unko Samjhanama		
2002	Sukha Dukha	Abishek	
2002	A Mero Hajur	Abishek	
2004	Hami Tin Bhai		
2004	Jeevan Rekha		
2005	Prem Yudha		
2005	Ajambari Nata	Aakash	
2005	Pahuna		
2006	Bharosa		
2007	Nata Ragatko	Pritam thakur	
2008	Kaha Bhetiyela	Abishek	Also produced it.
2010	Ram Balaram	Ram	
2011	Hamro Maya Juni Juni Lai	Dev	
2011	Shriman Shrimatee	Rajesh	
2013	Subhakamana		
2014	Kohinoor	Abhishek Kharel (Babu)	Also produced it, and it was his last film.
